= Canacona taluka =

Taluka (city) of Goa, India

Coordinates: 15.0200°N 74.0200°E

Canacona Konkani: Kankonn Portuguese: Canácona
- Taluka
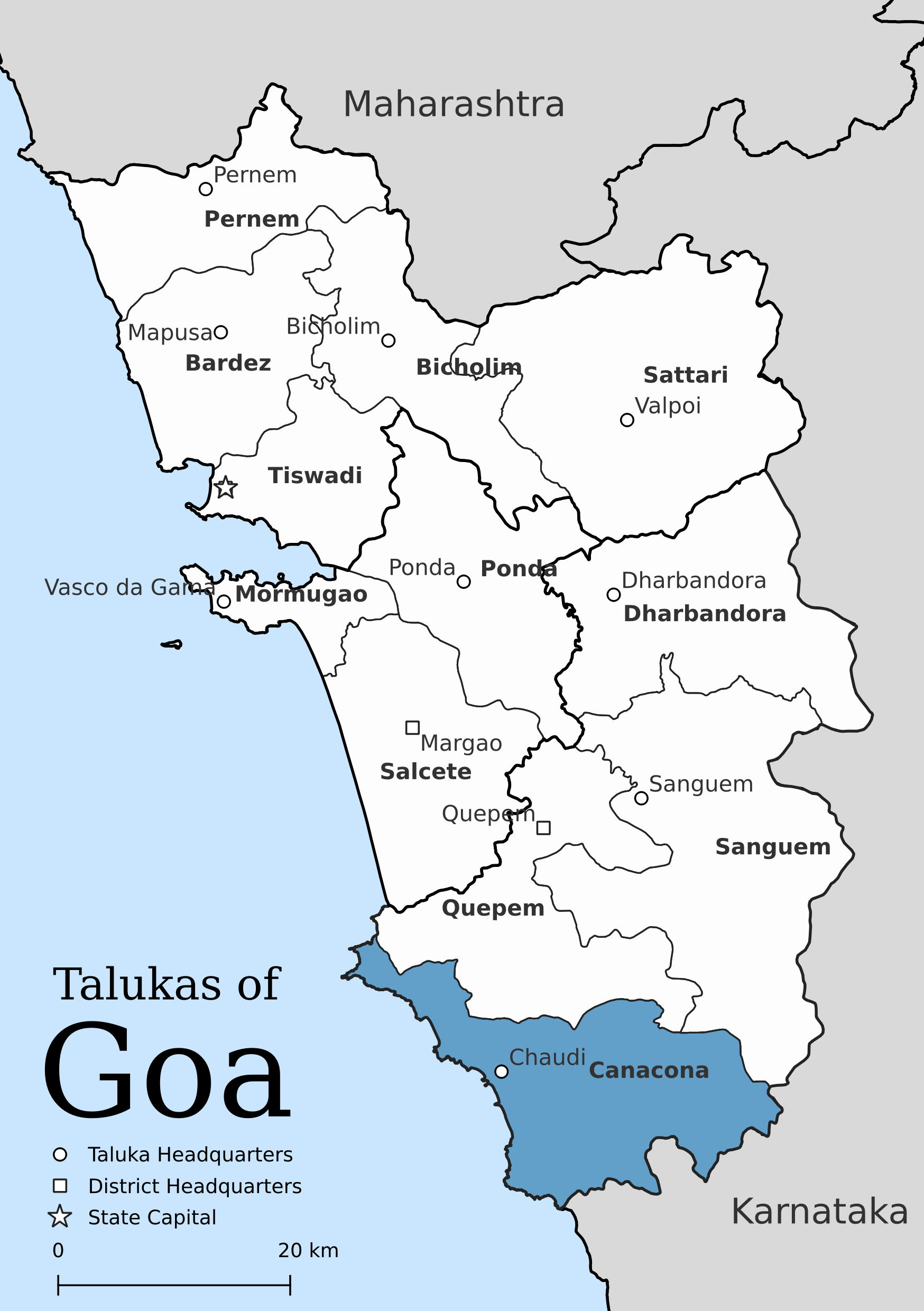
- Location of Canacona in Kushavati district in Goa
- Country: India
- State: Goa
- District: Kushavati district
- Vehicle registration: GA-10

Canacona is an administrative region in Kushavati district of Goa state, India.

Canacona is one of the four subdivisions (talukas) that constitute the Kushavati district. It is bounded on the north by the taluka of Quepem, on the northeast by Sanguem, on the south by the state of Karnataka, and on the west by the Arabian Sea. The town of Chaudi is the administrative headquarters of the taluka of Canacona.

The name Canacona is a corruption of the name Konkan. The area was one of the districts of the former Kingdom of Soonda, itself a remnant of the former Vijayanagara Empire. When Soonda was invaded and partially occupied by Hyder Ali of Mysore, the heirless Raja ceded the remaining parts to Portugal; and these were incorporated into Goa as the districts of Quepem, Sanguem, and Canacona. In the recent elections, Kishen Naikgaunkar got elected as the President of the Canacona, and Samba Naik Desai got elected as an Attorney.

Canacona was incorporated into Goa in AD 1794. Like most of Goa, the culture of the district reflects an Indo-Portuguese fusion, yet Canacona experienced less Lusitanisation than the central Velhas Conquistas (Old Conquests) of Goa.

== Demographics ==
At the time of the 2011 Census of India, Canacona has a population of 45,172 with sex ratio of 1005 females to 1000 males. Canacona Taluka has an average literacy rate of 84.68%, higher than the national average of 74.04%: male literacy is 90.02% and female literacy is 79.39%. Scheduled Castes and Scheduled Tribes make up 0.38% and 30.23% of the population respectively. 27.53% of the population lives in urban areas.

=== Religion ===
Religion in Canacona Taluka (2011)
Religion	Percent
Hinduism	80.47%
Christianity	17.70%
Islam	1.69%
Other or not stated	0.14%

Hinduism is followed by the majority of population of Canacona Taluka. Christians form a significant minority. At the time of the 2011 Census of India 80.47% of the population of the Taluka followed Hinduism, 17.70% Christianity, 1.69% Islam and 0.24% of the population followed other religions or did not state a religious affiliation.

=== Languages ===
Konkani is the most spoken language in Canacona taluka.

Languages of Canacona Taluka (2011)
1. Konkani (87.3%)
2. Marathi (6.27%)
3. Hindi (1.63%)
4. Kannada (1.53%)
5. Others (3.31%)

At the time of 2011 Census of India, 87.26% of the population of Canacona taluka spoke Konkani, 6.27% Marathi, 1.63% Hindi and 1.53% Kannada as their first language.

== Transport ==
The Canacona railway station of the Konkan Railways is located at the center of the district, close to the tourist attractions of the coast. The railway junction of Margao to the north is the closest major rail station. Buses from Mumbai may terminate at Panaji (Panjim), but some go on to Margao. The Canacona bus stand opened in 2004 is considered by many to be among the best designed bus-stands in India. Highway Route NH17 from Bombay to Goa connects Chaudi to Margao and Panaji. The newly constructed Canacona bypass in November 2019 NH 66 highway named after Manohar Parrikar the bypass named after him "Manohar Parrikar bypass" as it was his and many people dream. It shortens 10 km of distance from old highway of 18 km and this bypass is of just 8 km connecting mashem to char rasta which can be completed the distance in couple of minutes with the scenic coastal view. The scenic coastal road connects Navelim, Chinchinim, Assolna, Betul, and Canaguinim.

Additional Konkan Railway station in Cancona started functioning in 2013 in Loliem which is the southernmost village in Cancona right on Goa-Karnataka border.

=== Maps ===
- FallingRain Map

== Tourism ==
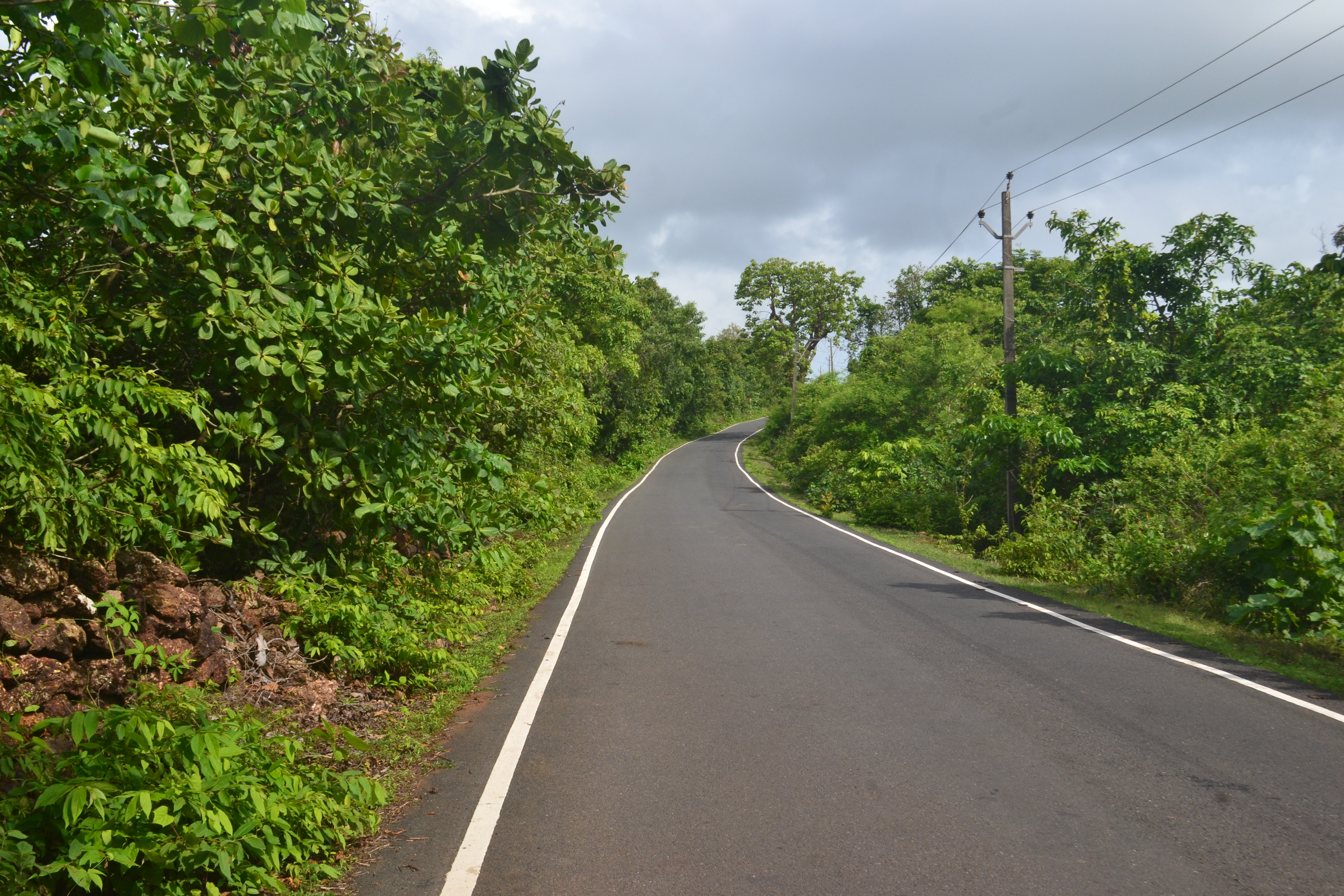
Road in Canacona Taluka at Goa, India

Tourism is rather human-scale, people-friendly and relatively more-affordable than other parts of Goa. Away from the coast, Canacona and its neighbouring district of Quepem have a number of off-the-beaten-track destinations and unusual festivals.

The tourism industry, which developed first in central Goa, did not develop in Canacona until the early 1990s. Much of the tourist infrastructure here is run through small-scale local initiatives.

In Goa, generally, locals have mixed feelings though about the impact of tourism on the region, with views increasingly pointing to the environmental degradation and social distortions due to the growth of this sector; however, the discussion remains largely academic, with few people directly involved in the field being influenced by the debates. Canacona was relatively left untouched by tourism until the early nineties as it was not easily accessible by public transport and the local economy wasn't enterprising enough to cater to tourists. Incidentally there was just one restaurant in the main street of canacona where one could expect the local meal during the day in the eighties.

=== Tourist attractions ===
Canacona's beach belt, 'discovered' by tourism only after the 1990s, is among the most scenic. Palolem is a milder recreation of an east-meets-west Goan beach, with a rich variety of exotic food and accommodation to cater to the international palate. Polem is another beach situated at the south of Canacona which too is popular among tourists.

Beyond the better known Palolem and Agonda, there are nearly a dozen-and-half lesser-known (or even hidden) beaches, including Vaturem and Xendrem. Quepem's narrow sea front has several beaches, known for their scenery.

A prominent Hindu institution in Canacona is the Parthagali Math ("Portuguese Hindu Mutt"), a five-century-old ashram and religious headquarters built in a mix of Portuguese and Hindu architectural styles. There are also Hindu temples at Zambaulim and Fatorpa, and the Mallikarjun Temple, Shristhal, built by the Kshatriya samaj, is known for its festivals.

Canacona is one part of Goa where hillocks jut out almost directly into the sea. Villages are tucked away in low-lying areas, which are carpeted by a sea of green-topped coconut trees. Until foreign migration and tourism came to this area, the coconut tree was the means by which many eked a living, apart from fishing.

Some tourists are accommodated in beach huts, temporary beachside thatched huts built on coconut trees usually above ground level, right on the beach, during the fair weather (October–May) season.

Sanvordem and Quepem towns have many small, functional hotels. Attached to the temples of Mashem, Mallikarjun and Zambaulim, rooms are available in Agrashalas ("Dharmashalas" or pilgrim-hostels), primarily for pilgrims.

== Wildlife ==
Dolphin-watching and fishing trips attract visitors, especially British and Scandinavian visitors. The beach villages of Palolem and Agonda and the more deserted fort at the Cabo de Rama are developing as tourist destinations.

The Cotigao Wildlife Sanctuary, Goa's second-largest wildlife sanctuary, is located within this district. Its terrain is fairly plain, with hills in the south and east. Much of the sanctuary is covered with dense forests, with a few open grasslands. Forest crown density is often over 50%. Some trees, Goa's loftiest, touch 30 metres.

Villagers have reported sighting tigers, according to officials.

Birds are aplenty; some two hundred species could be spotted, given time and patience. These include the Indian pied hornbill, large golden-backed woodpecker and the great Indian woodpecker.

The Forest Department's scenic but simple rest-house is on the highway at Poinguinim, some 4 km away.

== Culture ==
The Shantadurga temple at Fatorpa, resorted to by both Hindus and Christians, holds its Zatra (i.e., Rath-Yatra or Pilgrimage-festival) on the ninth day of the Hindu month of Margashirish. It falls in Goa's cool season, sometime in December–January. Huge crowds from all over Goa make their way to this small remote village in the district of Quepem, some 5 km from Cuncolim.

During the Zatra, a tall, intricate, decorated, three-tiered wooden chariot (rath), into which the idol of the deity is placed, is and drawn by male devotees in a night procession.

Goa has a range of syncretic practices, where both Hindus and Christians worship at each other's shrines. Nearly every Goan Christian can trace ancestral roots to Hindu ancestors about five centuries ago.

The Hindu priests of the Shantadurga temple know many Goan Christian families by name, because they come to the festival yearly and donate money or goods.

American anthropologist Dr Robert S. Newman conducted detailed studies on this place and its phenomenon of syncretism.

The Shantadurga temple was originally in the village of Cuncolim, located in the consuelho of Salsette a few kilometers away, but was relocated across the then 'international boundary' into the Kingdom of Soonda when the Goa government expelled the Hindus and ordered their shrines demolished.

Another festival celebrated at the Shantadurga temple is the Festival of Umbrellas, or Sontreos. This is observed on the fifth day of Phalgun (usually in March). Once again, both Hindus and Christians take part in a mix of practises that crosses over religious border-lines.

In nearby Quepem, the temple of the Hindu deity Damodar, colloquially called Dam-bab, was relocated from Margao to the village of Zambaulim in what was then the Panchamahal district of the Kingdom of Soonda. Margao's businessmen have close ties with the deity and often conduct their business invoking it.

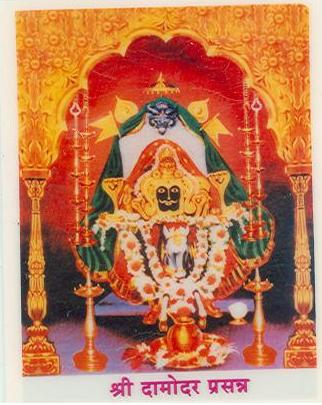
Lord Damodar, Zambaulim

The Mallikarjun Temple is at Shristhal, some 2.5 km away from Chaudi on the main-road leading to Karwar and is one where devotees head for advice from oracles called the 'kaul'. The advice of the oracles is taken either from priests in a trance or by them interpreting the way flower petals drop down. Locally, Mallikarjun is a popular deity, as visible from the names of local educational institutions. This centuries-old temple was renovated in 1778.

Canacona's supposedly aboriginal population, the Kunbis (with Gaonkar or Velip as their surnames) live in areas around Gaondongri, Cotigao, Chapoli (the site for a proposed new dam), Assali, Kulem, Khola and Agonda; the Velips are the priest class drawn from among the Kunbis.

The village of Loliem has a couple of centuries-old 'hero' stones, etchings on stone to record historic events of the time dating back many centuries. This village's statues of the Hindu deity Betal itself possibly goes back to the seventh century if not earlier, according to "cultural-historian" Phaldessai.

Canacona has several statues of Betal.

== Anjediva ==
Visits to the island of Anjediva, located to the south-west of Canacona, are possible by permission of the Station Commander of the Indian Navy's Seabird Base, which occupies the island. Future visits could be curtailed due to plans by the Navy to step up security.

To visit the island from Goa one has to proceed by any bus going to or via Karwar, leaving in the morning; the journey is about 2½ hours. From the Karwar bus stand one must walk the short distance to the wharves of Karwar port, from where a ferry takes one to the island. One might need to alight into a smaller boat before reaching the shore due to the shallowness of the island's waters.
