= List of districts of Goa =

The Indian state of Goa is divided into three districts: North Goa, South Goa and Kushavati.

== Administrative structure ==
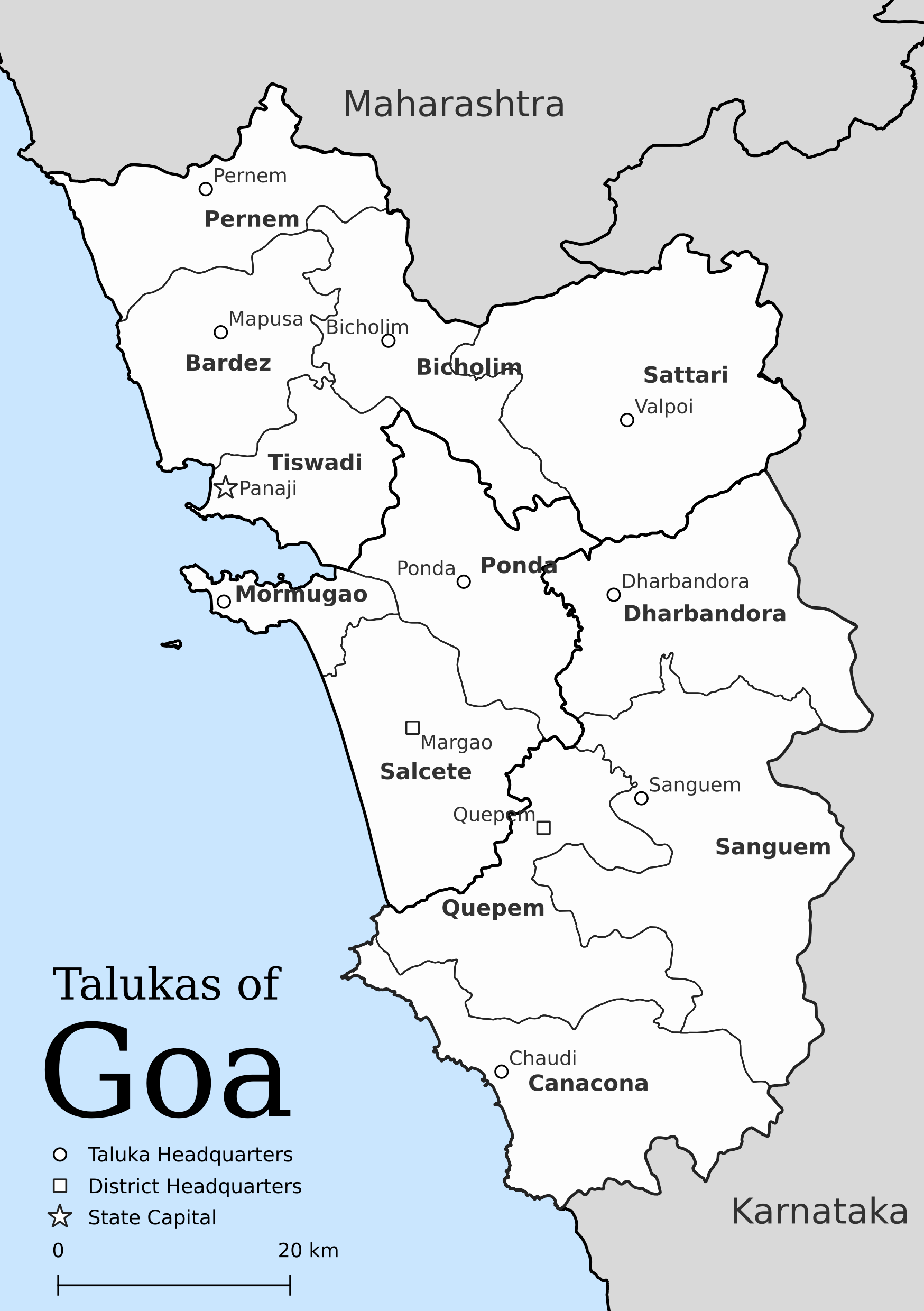
Administrative talukas of Goa state

North Goa is further divided into three subdivisions — Panaji, Mapusa, and Bicholim; and five talukas — Tiswadi, Bardez, Pernem, Bicholim, and Sattari.

South Goa is divided into three subdivisions — Ponda, Vasco da Gama, and Margao; and three talukas — Ponda, Mormugao, and Salcete. The Ponda taluka was moved from North Goa to South Goa in January 2015.

Kushavati is divided into four subdivisions — Sanguem, Dharbandora, Quepem and Canacona (Chaudi); and four talukas — Sanguem, Dharbandora, Quepem and Canacona. The district was formed in December 2025 after being split from South Goa.

== Districts ==
Sl No	Code	District	Headquarters	Population (2011)	Area (km^{2})	Density (/km^{2})	Official website	Map
1	NG	North Goa	Panaji	817,761	1,736	471	https://northgoa.gov.in/	
2	SG	South Goa	Margao	639,962	1,966	326	https://southgoa.nic.in/	
3		Kushavati district	Quepem	639,962	1,966	326	https://kushavati.goa.gov.in/	
