= Loliem railway station =

Railway station in Goa, India

Loliem Railway Station

General information
- Location: Loliem-Polem, Canacona taluk, Kushavati district, Goa, India
- Coordinates: 14.9393°N 74.0883°E
- Elevation: 27 metres (89 ft)
- System: Regional rail and Light rail station
- Owner: Indian Railways
- Operator: Konkan Railway
- Line: Konkan Railway
- Platforms: 1
- Tracks: 2

Construction
- Structure type: Standard (on-ground station)
- Accessible: Yes

Other information
- Status: Functioning
- Station code: LOL
- Zone(s): Konkan Railway
- Division(s): Karwar
- Fare zone: Indian Railways

History
- Opened: 2011; 15 years ago

Services
Preceding station	Indian Railways	Following station
Canacona towards Roha	Konkan Railway Konkan Railway	Asnoti towards Thokur
Route map
Location
- Location within Goa

Loliem Railway Station (Station code: LOL) a railway station in Goa, under the jurisdiction of the Konkan Railway. It's the last railway station in South-West railway zone (Konkan Railway) in the state of Goa in its southern end.

== Administration ==
The station lies in Loliem-Polem village in the sub-district (taluka) of Canacona and is under the Karwar railway division of the Konkan Railway zone, a subsidiary zone of Indian Railways.

== History ==
The establishment of this station was announced in September 2011, nearly a decade and a half after the railway was commissioned in 1997. A brief newspaper announcement simply said that a new railway station at Loliem between the existing stations of Asnoti (Karnataka) and Canacona (Goa) was being set up by the Konkan Railway Corporation and would "facilitate [the] many locals who commute from Loliem-Polem to Margao everyday [sic]". The announcement was made by the Konkan Railway Corporation's managing director B P Tayal.

== Other stations ==
Madgaon (locally spelt in English more often as Margao) railway station in South Goa district is the largest Konkan Railway station within Goa, while Thivim in North Goa comes at second place. The former is a gateway to South Goa, Margao, the urban area of Vasco da Gama, and the beaches of South Goa, while the latter is a gateway to Mapusa town, the emigration-oriented sub-district of Bardez, and the North Goa beach belt. Karmali railway station is closest to the state capital of Panjim (or Panaji), the administrative capital of Goa.
