= Curchorem =

- City
- Location of Curchorem in Goa Curchorem (India)
- Coordinates: 15°15′37″N 74°06′30″E
- Country: India
- State: Goa
- District: Kushavati district
- Sub-district: Quepem

Government
  - Type: Municipal Council
  - Chairperson: Sushant Naik
  - Vice-chairperson: Sujata Naik

Area
  - Total: 22.6 km^{2} (8.7 sq mi)
- Elevation: 13 m (43 ft)

Population (2011)
  - Total: 22,730
  - Density: 1,010/km^{2} (2,600/sq mi)

Languages
  - Official: Konkani
- Time zone: UTC+5:30 (IST)
- PIN: 403706
- Vehicle registration: GA
- Website: http://ccmccurchoremgoa.webs.com/

Curchorem (Kudchade)(Also known as 'Vodlemol cacora') is a city and municipal council in the Kushavati district of Goa, India. Curchorem is a part of the Quepem taluka and is a twin town with Sanvordem, both located on either side of the Zuari River. The town is self-sufficient and has a number of hospitals (including a Government Primary Health Centre), schools, a police station, banks, ATMs, a railway station, good road links, a market, places of worship, restaurants, a play ground, an electricity station and a theatre.

== Geography ==
Curchorem is located at 15°15′37″N 74°06′30″E and has an average elevation of 13 metres (43 ft). The confluence of Uguem and Guleli rivers at Sanguem or Sangam is known as Zuari river. It runs north west up to sanvordem. Further it runs up to the west till Kushawati River and joins at Xelvona. Then again it changes its direction to the north till it reaches Panchwadi and further flows up to Rachol. again flows up to north to Borim and further north-west up to Racaim, Durbhat and finally to the Arabian Sea where it joins to Mormugao. It covers 67 kilometers in the goa district.

=== Climate ===
Curchorem features a tropical monsoon climate. The climate in Curchorem is hot in summer and equable in winter. During summers (from March to May) the temperature reaches up to 32 °C and in winters (from December to February) it is usually between 25.8 °C and 20 °C. The monsoon period is from June to September with heavy rainfall and gusty winds. The annual average rainfall is 2699 mm (106.24 inches).

Climate data for Curchorem
Month	Jan	Feb	Mar	Apr	May	Jun	Jul	Aug	Sep	Oct	Nov	Dec	Year
Mean daily maximum °C (°F)	31.6 (88.9)	31.8 (89.2)	32.8 (91.0)	33.9 (93.0)	34.0 (93.2)	31.1 (88.0)	29.5 (85.1)	29.2 (84.6)	29.8 (85.6)	31.5 (88.7)	32.1 (89.8)	31.9 (89.4)	31.6 (88.9)
Mean daily minimum °C (°F)	20.1 (68.2)	20.9 (69.6)	23.3 (73.9)	25.7 (78.3)	26.7 (80.1)	25.1 (77.2)	24.4 (75.9)	24.3 (75.7)	24.0 (75.2)	23.9 (75.0)	22.2 (72.0)	20.9 (69.6)	23.5 (74.2)
Average precipitation mm (inches)	0 (0)	0 (0)	1 (0.0)	14 (0.6)	104 (4.1)	709 (27.9)	929 (36.6)	507 (20.0)	250 (9.8)	137 (5.4)	37 (1.5)	11 (0.4)	2,699 (106.3)
Source: []

== Demographics ==
Population growth
Year	Pop.	±%
1991	18,489	—
2001	21,407	+15.8%
2011	22,730	+6.2%

As of the 2011 Census of India, Curchorem Cacora had a population of 22,730. Males constituted 51% of the population and females 49%. Curchorem Cacora had an average literacy rate of 88.85%, higher than the national average of 74.04%: male literacy was 92.57% and female literacy 84.97%. 10.54% of the population was under 6 years of age.

== Administration and Law ==
The city is divided into several wards namely; Pontemol, Morailem, Bansai, Cariamoddi, Shirfod, Bepquegal, Madhegal, Cacora, Dabhamoll, Kamral, Khamamoll, Baga-Curchorem and Kakkumoddi. There is an elected member from each ward in the municipality. The members elect a municipal chairperson.

The city also sends a member to the Goa Legislative Assembly and in the Lok Sabha, is a part of the South Goa constituency. The present MLA is Nilesh Cabral of the Bharatiya Janata Party.

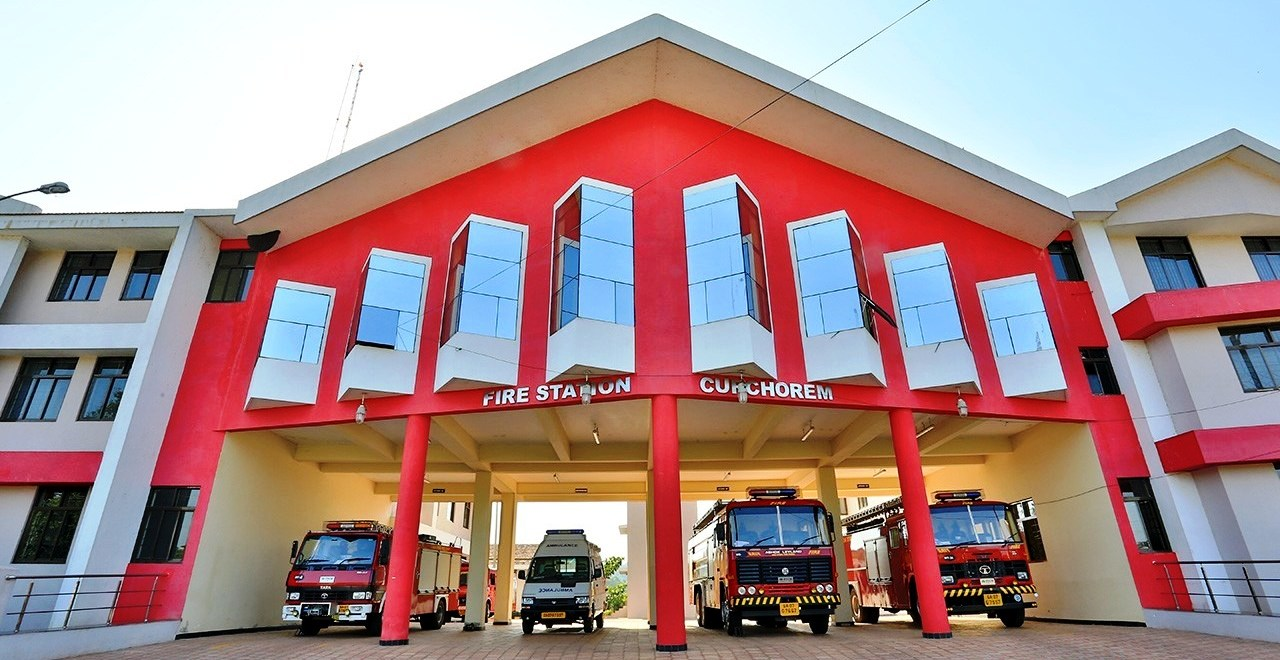
Curchorem-Fire station

Curchorem has a police station, which serve city of Curchorem and neighbouring villages. Curchorem also has a major fire station, which cater to areas like Chandor, Curchorem, Sanvordem and Quepem. The fire station has one emergency rescue tender, two heavy water tenders and one quick response vehicle. It has between 40 and 50 fire fighters.

== Economy ==
Zuari river as it flows down from the hills divides this village into two: The northern part is called Sanvordem and southern as Curchorem. Being navigable, this river was largely responsible to the prosperity of the town, where small vessels with passengers, goods and merchandise touched the small dock at Khamamoll from Panaji, Old Goa etc. Also small wooden rafters, salts, vegetables etc. touched this small dock.

The railway line from Marmugoa to Londa passing through Curchorem, Kalay and Collem was laid in the year 1880 which led to the economic prosperity of this place.

The major economic activity of this region is centered around mining. Many mining companies ply their trucks via Curchorem. The ore reserves around this area are home to major business houses of Goa like Sesa Goa (Renamed Sesa Sterlite Ltd), Dempo (Now Sesa Resources Ltd), Timblo, Salgaocar, Fomentos Minescape, Agencia Mineral Maritima, Agarwal, Bandekars, etc. Employment of majority of the population living in this town are directly or indirectly related to the Mining Industry.

The town has an industrial estate called the Kakoda Industrial Estate. It is home to many industries.

== Culture ==
Curchorem has many places of worship namely Marutigad, Ganpati temple, Sateri temple, Purushmharu temple, Mahadev temple, Guardian Angel Church and the Jama Masjid. The town hosts a Shigmotsav festival early in the calendar year and recently also hosted the Carnival. The town also attracts devotees for the Zatras.

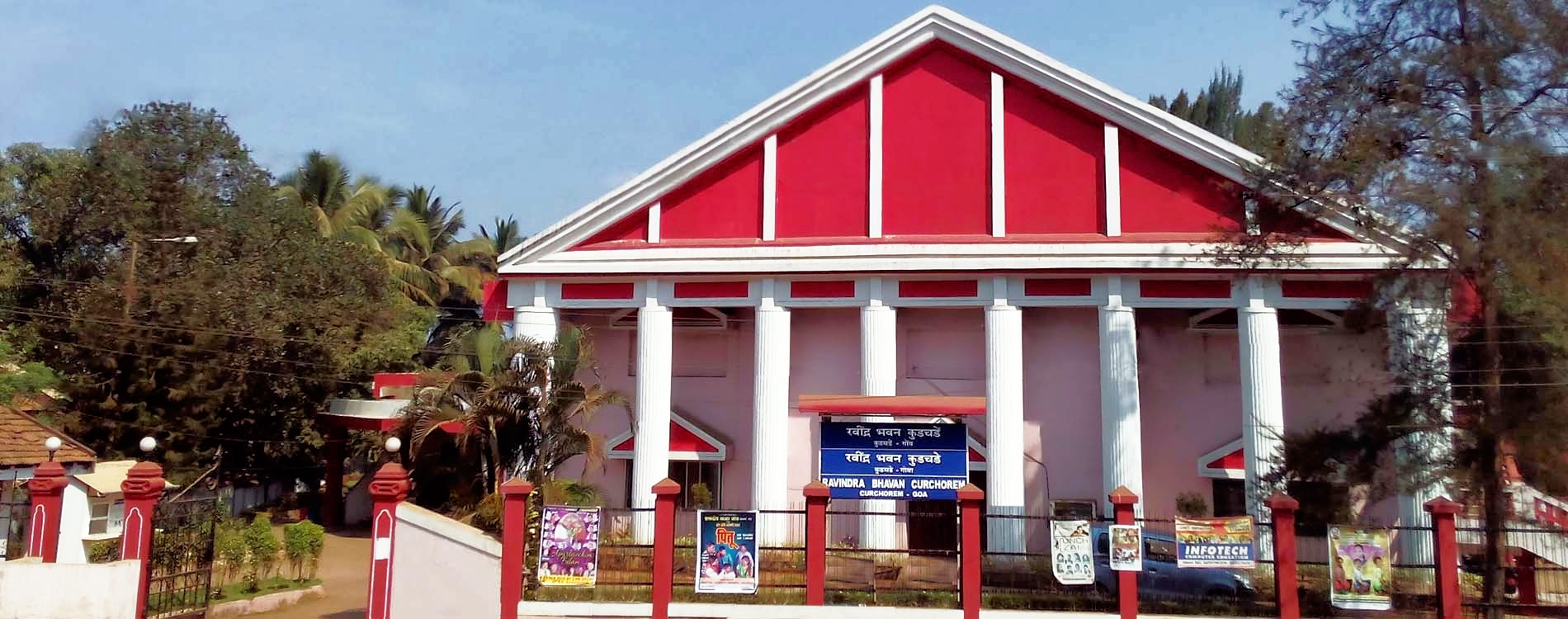
Ravindra Bhavan in Curchorem

The State of the art auditorium called as RAVINDRA BHAVAN, is developed to promote art and culture around the vicinity of Curchorem city. The premises is standing besides the Curchorem Sanguem Road at the hill foot of Marutigad. Drama Festival, Tiatr Festival, Sangeet Natak Mahotsav, Theatre Workshop, Art camps for children, Women empowerment programmes, Workshops on various folk forms and music, Christmas carol singing competition, Quawali, World Theatre Day, Educational programmes, Awareness programmes on Health and Law, Photography workshops, Konkani Drama competitions, Shiv Jayanti, Students Day are some of the programmes conducted by Ravindra Bhavan, Curchorem regularly. Expansion of Ravindra Bhavan Curchorem has been finalized to be taken up just behind the backside of the existing premises which will be adjacent to the proposed Bus-stand complex.PHASE–II consists of New auditorium of 200 seats, Amphitheatre of 2000 Capacity & Statue of Gurudev Ravindranath Tagore.

== Government and politics ==
Curchorem is part of Curchorem (Goa Assembly constituency) and South Goa (Lok Sabha constituency).

== Education ==
The town's schools include The New Educational High School, Sarvodaya Educational Society, Guardian Angel High School, Smt C T Naik High School, Our Lady of Perpetual Succor Convent School, Shree Saraswati Prathamik Marathi Vidhyalaya, Fr.Agnelo Primary School and the newly introduced Cambridge School.

The two schools for Higher Secondary Education are Guardian Angel Higher Secondary School and Smt. C.T.Naik Higher Secondary School.

The town also has a Hotel Management School managed by the same management that runs the Guardian Angel High School. Also housed is an ITI (Industrial Training Institute) located in Cacora. There is also a college which imparts Polytechnic Diploma which is well known as Government Polytechnic, Curchorem (GPC) which offers courses in various disciplines.

Also Sanjay School for Special Children is run in Pontemol. Fr.Agnelo School of Music and Performing Arts is run by Pilar Fathers which caters the musical study needs of the students of the area.

The Pilar Fathers have played a vital role in promoting education in this area. Guardian Angel educational Complex provides education to more than 3000 students annually from nursery education to Degree Course in Hotel Management.

== Sports ==
Curchorem has a SAG Sports Complex with mini multipurpose sports hall, gymnasium & cricket ground. City also has a football ground. Like the rest of Goa, football is a popular sport in Curchorem. The Guardian Angel Sports Club plays in Goa Professional League.

Another Sports Complex has been proposed which will come up behind Curchorem Post Office. This project will include Badminton, Basketball (Indoor & Outdoor Courts), Squash, Volleyball (Indoor & Outdoor Courts), Table Tennis, Billiards & Pool, Chess & Carrom, Swimming (Indoor & Outdoor Pools Including Competition Pools), Fitness Centre, Rock Climbing Wall, Running Track (Indoor), Tennis Courts, Cricket Practice Pitches (Indoor & Outdoor), Exhibition Gallery & Workshops, Library & Reading Room, Public Gardens & Children Play Area, Jogger's Track, Skating Rink.

== Transport ==
=== Air ===
The airport nearest to Curchorem is Dabolim Airport, 32 km away.

=== Rail ===
Curchorem railway station is one of Goa's oldest railway station. Curchorem railway station comes under South Western Railway line. This line was laid in the year 1880. Tome Caetano de Costa from Aldona, Bardez, a Catholic carpenter was entrusted with laying of the railway line and construction of Curchorem-Sanvordem railway station. One of the main contractor of the rail line from Marmugoa to Collem was Cosme Damiao Noronha and his sub-contractor was Tome Caetano de Costa. Curchorem-Sanvordem was covered with thick forests and wild animals, so that people used to think that Sanvordem forms an outer limit of Goa. The Portuguese government asked the British government to start the railway line. This was the most difficult task as hills had to be cut down, tunnels dug and thick forest to be cleared.

=== Road ===
Curchorem is connected by road to other cities like Margao, Ponda, Quepem and also other cities and towns of Goa.

== Tourism and attractions ==
=== Local sightseeing-in and near the city area:- ===
- Salaulim Dam, around 10 km from Curchorem, Biggest dam in Goa along with a nature park and a botanical garden patterned on the Brindavan Gardens in Mysore.
- Dudhsagar Water Falls, around 22 km from Curchorem, is a scenic waterfall. The spot also provides various options for trekkers. The best time to visit is during or soon after the Monsoon.
- Nanda Lake
- Nearby beaches: Colva Beach, Benaulim Beach, Majorda Beach, Betalbatim Beach, Betul Beach, Canaiguinim Beach, Agonda Beach, Rajbag Beach, Polem Beach.

== Environmental issues ==
The town is a hub of the mining industry in South Goa. The railway station is a major loading point for the ores from nearby mines. This ore is transported using trucks which ply on the town roads for a major part of the day leading to dust and noise pollution, and major traffic jams. This has led to some civic tension in the town. Plans for a bypass are underway.

== Notable people ==
- Alvito D'Cunha, Indian footballer
- Purushottam Kakodkar, Indian freedom fighter
