= Veerabhadra (dance) =

Goan dance

Veerbhadra is a traditional ritual dance form performed annually in Goa, India. It is performed toward the end of the Shigmo festival in regions such as Sanguem, Ponda, Borim, and Sanvordem. It is also performed on the full moon day of Chaitra (Chaitra Poornima) at the Vithal Temple in Sanquelim, where it is distinct compared to other locations.

== Preparation and attire ==
The role of Veerbhadra is traditionally inherited by a male performer from a specific family. Prior to the full moon, the dancer observes a three-day religious vow consisting of strict observances, including fasting, refraining from eating food prepared by others, and sleeping on the floor.

At midnight on the full moon, the dancer goes to a traditionally designated location to get dressed. Prayers are offered and a coconut is broken as a ritual offering. The performer lies flat on his back on the ground while a traditional makeup artist paints his face in the style of Kathakali from Kerala, giving him the appearance of a fierce demon.

The costume consists of a flared cloth wrapped around the waist, demonic garments, and ornaments worn on the hands and arms. He wears a Mysorean-style pagdi on his head. Tied behind his back is a large decorated halo-like structure (prabhavall) constructed from bamboo strips, coloured cloth, and paper. He carries an unsheathed sword in each hand. After the dressing and adornment are complete, additional prayers and coconut-breaking rituals take place.

== Ritual and procession ==
While the performer is being dressed, a theatrical drama depicting the narrative of the destruction of Daksha's Yajna (Daksha Yajna Vansa) begins inside the temple. Around dawn, a procession carrying the decorated Veerbhadra starts at a distance from the temple. The procession includes torchbearers holding two large torches (divtyo), musicians, and attendants on both sides who support the heavy back prabhavali.

During the procession, the dancer halts at a designated location. A leader (murveli) standing in front of Veerbhadra shouts a traditional proclamation known as Horavani. While the chant is recited, Veerbhadra stands in place and moves his head. The surrounding crowd responds to each chant with the phrase "Ha Udo". Following the proclamation, the dance commences to the accompaniment of musical instruments.

As Veerbhadra approaches the temple enclosure (mandap), the actors performing the drama remove their costumes and flee, bringing the performance to a halt. Veerbhadra enters the mandap dancing with his swords, simulating a battle scene. After executing specific cycles of the dance, he collapses onto the ground at a designated spot, where he is caught by his attendants. Holy water (teerth) from the temple is sprinkled on his face, followed by concluding temple rituals that mark the end of the festival.

== Regional variations and origin ==
In most regions outside Sanquelim, the Shigmo Veerbhadra performance does not include the theatrical drama component. In Sanguem, the dance is specifically performed in front of the residence of the Kosambe family.

The attire, dance style, and proclamations associated with Veerbhadra follow a Kannada (Kanadi) tradition. The performance shares strong structural similarities with the Veerbhadra tradition practiced in Tumkur, Karnataka. It is believed that the ritual form migrated from Karnataka to Goa during historical times.
