= South Goa district =

Coordinates: 15.2724°N 73.9583°E

- District of Goa
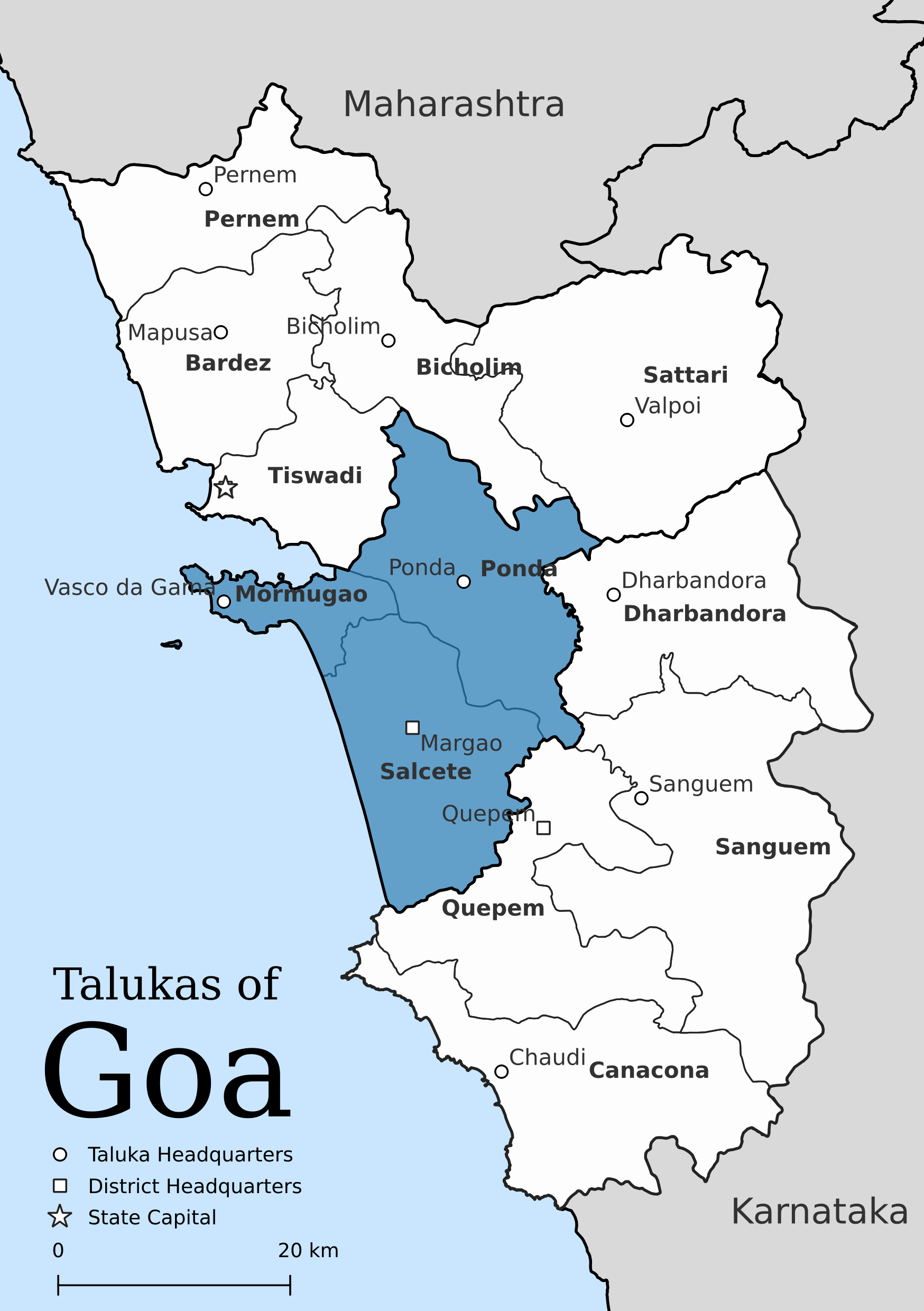
- South Goa district in Goa state
- Country: India
- State: Goa
- Headquarters: Margao
- Talukas: 1. Salcete; 2. Mormugao; 3. Ponda

Government
  - District collector: Egna Cleetus, IAS
  - Lok Sabha constituencies: South Goa
  - Member of Parliament, Lok Sabha: Viriato Fernandes (INC)

Area
  - Total: 1,966 km^{2} (759 sq mi)
  - Rank: 1st

Population (2011)
  - Total: 640,537
  - Rank: 2nd
  - Density: 325.8/km^{2} (843.8/sq mi)
  - Urban: 64.59%

Demographics
  - Literacy: 85.53%
  - Sex ratio: 980
- Time zone: UTC+05:30 (IST)
- PIN: 4032xx ,4034xx, 4036xx, 4037xx,4038xx (South Goa)
- Telephone: +91 0832
- Vehicle registration: GA-02
- Major highways: 1.National Highway 66, 2.National Highway 4A
- Largest city: Cuncolim (28.7 km^{2})
- Largest city (by population): Mormugao
- Climate: Am (Köppen)
- Website: southgoa.nic.in

South Goa district is one of the three districts that together constitute within the state of Goa, India, within the region known as the Konkan. It is bounded by North Goa district to the north, while the Arabian Sea forms its western coast. It ranks among the top 25 developed districts of India. The district capital city is Margao, which also serves as the commercial capital of Goa.

== History ==
The Portuguese established a colony in Goa in 1510 and expanded the colony to its present boundaries during the 17th and 18th centuries. Goa was annexed by India on 19 December 1961. Goa and two other former Portuguese enclaves became the union territory of Goa, Daman, and Diu, and Goa was organised into a single district in 1965. On 30 May 1987, Goa attained statehood (while Daman and Diu became a separate union territory), and Goa was reorganised into two districts, North Goa and South Goa.

== Administration ==
Egna Cleetus, an officer of the Indian Administrative Service, is the Collector and District Magistrate of South Goa. There are deputy collectors and mamlatdars for each subdivision/taluka.

The headquarters of the district is Margao.

There are 205 revenue villages in South Goa District under seven Talukas (subdistricts) headed each by the Mamlatdar.

== Divisions ==
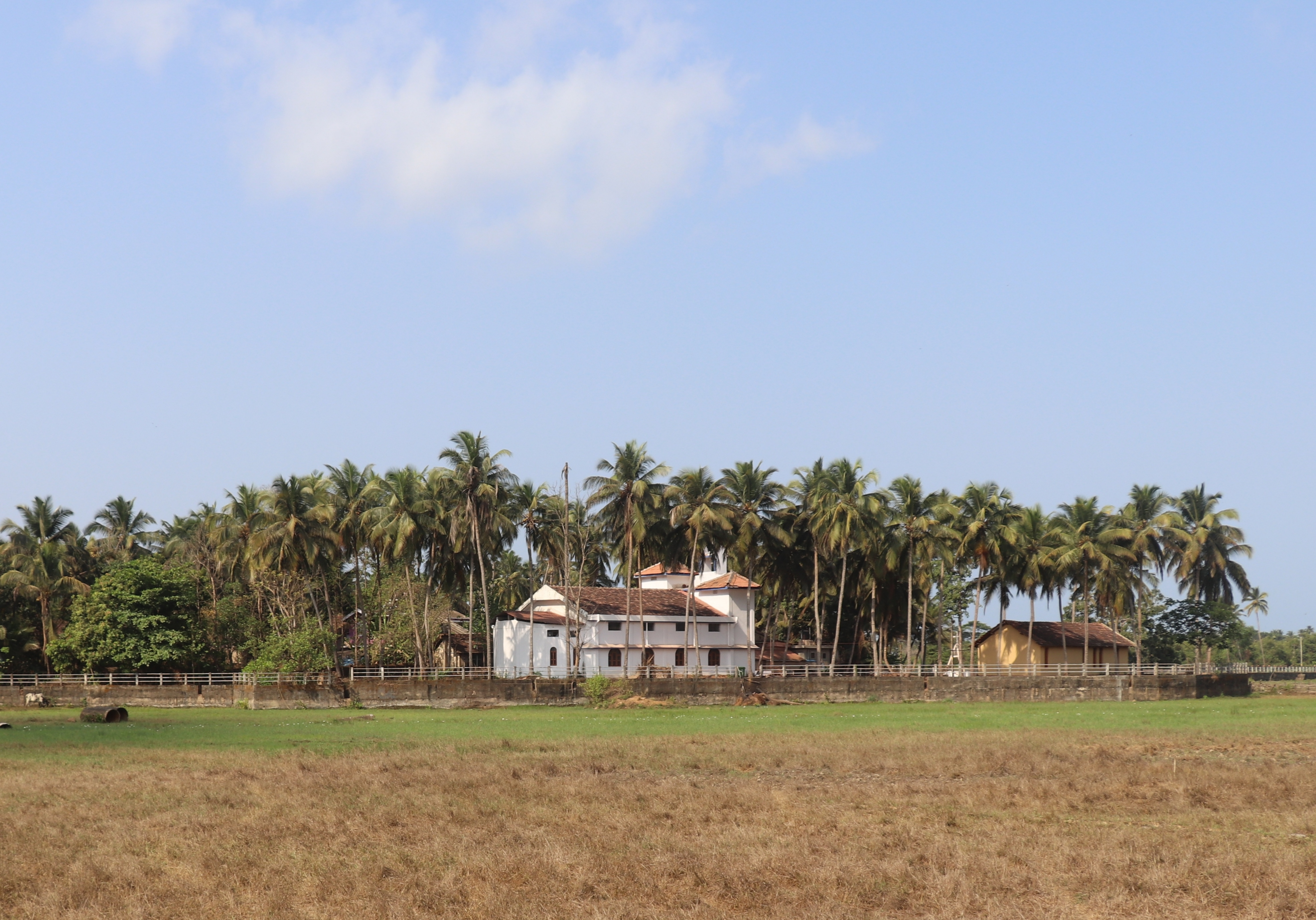
Rural Salcete, South Goa

Margao is the administrative headquarters of the district. The Matanhy Saldanha Administrative Complex, the collectorate building, named after former minister and social activist Mathany Saldanha, is located on the outskirts of the city, adjoining the intercity bus stand.

The district was divided into five subdivisions—Ponda, Mormugao-Vasco, Margao, Quepem, and Dharbandora; and seven talukas—Ponda, Dharbandora, Sanguem, Mormugao (Vasco), Salcete (Margao), Quepem, and Canacona (Chaudi).

Ponda taluka that was previously part of North Goa district became part of South Goa district in January 2015.

== Politics ==
District	No.	Constituency	Name	Party	Alliance	Remarks
South Goa	24	Mormugao	Sankalp Amonkar	Indian National Congress	UPA	Switched from INC to BJP on 14 September 2022
South Goa	24	Mormugao	Sankalp Amonkar	Bharatiya Janata Party	NDA	Switched from INC to BJP on 14 September 2022
South Goa	25	Vasco Da Gama	Krishna Salkar	Bharatiya Janata Party	NDA	
South Goa	26	Dabolim	Mauvin Godinho	Bharatiya Janata Party	NDA	Cabinet Minister
South Goa	27	Cortalim	Antonio Vas	Independent	NDA	
South Goa	28	Nuvem	Aleixo Sequeira	Indian National Congress	UPA	Switched from INC to BJP on 14 September 2022
South Goa	28	Nuvem	Aleixo Sequeira	Bharatiya Janata Party	NDA	Switched from INC to BJP on 14 September 2022
South Goa	29	Curtorim	Aleixo Lourenco	Independent	NDA	
South Goa	30	Fatorda	Vijai Sardesai	Goa Forward Party	UPA	
South Goa	31	Margao	Digambar Kamat	Indian National Congress	UPA	Switched from INC to BJP on 14 September 2022Cabinet Minister
South Goa	31	Margao	Digambar Kamat	Bharatiya Janata Party	NDA	Switched from INC to BJP on 14 September 2022Cabinet Minister
South Goa	32	Benaulim	Venzy Viegas	Aam Aadmi Party		
South Goa	33	Navelim	Ulhas Tuenkar	Bharatiya Janata Party	NDA	
South Goa	34	Cuncolim	Yuri Alemao	Indian National Congress	UPA	
South Goa	35	Velim	Cruz Silva	Aam Aadmi Party		

== Transport ==
Frequent buses are available between Margao and North Goa.

== Demographics ==
Historical population
Year	Pop.	±% p.a.
1900	181,439	—
1910	180,429	−0.06%
1920	181,455	+0.06%
1931	191,667	+0.50%
1940	204,297	+0.71%
1950	216,574	+0.59%
1960	240,330	+1.05%
1971	336,808	+3.12%
1981	439,728	+2.70%
1991	504,989	+1.39%
2001	589,095	+1.55%
2011	640,537	+0.84%

According to the 2011 census South Goa has a population of 640,537 which is roughly equal to the nation of Montenegro or the US state of Vermont. This gives it a ranking of 515th in India (out of a total of 640). The district has a population density of 326 inhabitants per square kilometre (840/sq mi). Its population growth rate over the decade 2001–2011 was 8.63%. South Goa has a sex ratio of 980 females for every 1000 males, and a literacy rate of 85.53%. The Scheduled Castes and Scheduled Tribes make up 1.22% and 14.47% of the population of the district.

=== Religion ===
Religion in South Goa district
Religion	Percent
Hinduism	55.5%
Christianity	33.4%
Islam	10.7%
Others	0.4%

Block	Hindu	Christian	Other
Mormugao	100,239	33,288	21,034
Salcete	101,921	157,744	34,799
Ponda	138,705	14,010	13,115

Hinduism (55.5%) is followed by the majority of population of South Goa. Christians (33.4%) forms a significant minority.

=== Language ===
Languages of South Goa district (2011)
1. Konkani (66.4%)
2. Hindi (12.4%)
3. Marathi (6.45%)
4. Kannada (3.62%)
5. Urdu (3.39%)
6. Malayalam (1.00%)
7. Others (6.72%)

At the time of the 2011 Census of India, 66.44% of the population in the district spoke Konkani, 12.38% Hindi, 6.45% Marathi, 5.98% Kannada, 3.39% Urdu, 1.00% Malayalam, 0.86% Telugu, 0.55% Bengali, 0.49% Tamil, 0.49% Gujarati, 0.44% Odia and 0.42% English as their first language.

== Education ==
There are many educational institutions in South Goa. The prominent colleges include:

- National Institute of Technology Goa in Cuncolim .
- Birla Institute of Technology and Science, Pilani – Goa Campus in Zuarinagar.
- The Parvatibai Chowgule College in Margao.
- Govind Ramnath Kare College of Law in Margao.
- Padre Conceicao College of Engineering (PCCE) in Verna.
- MES College in Vasco da Gama.

== See also ==
- Kushavati district
