= Mallikarjuna Temple, Goa =

Mallikarjuna Temple
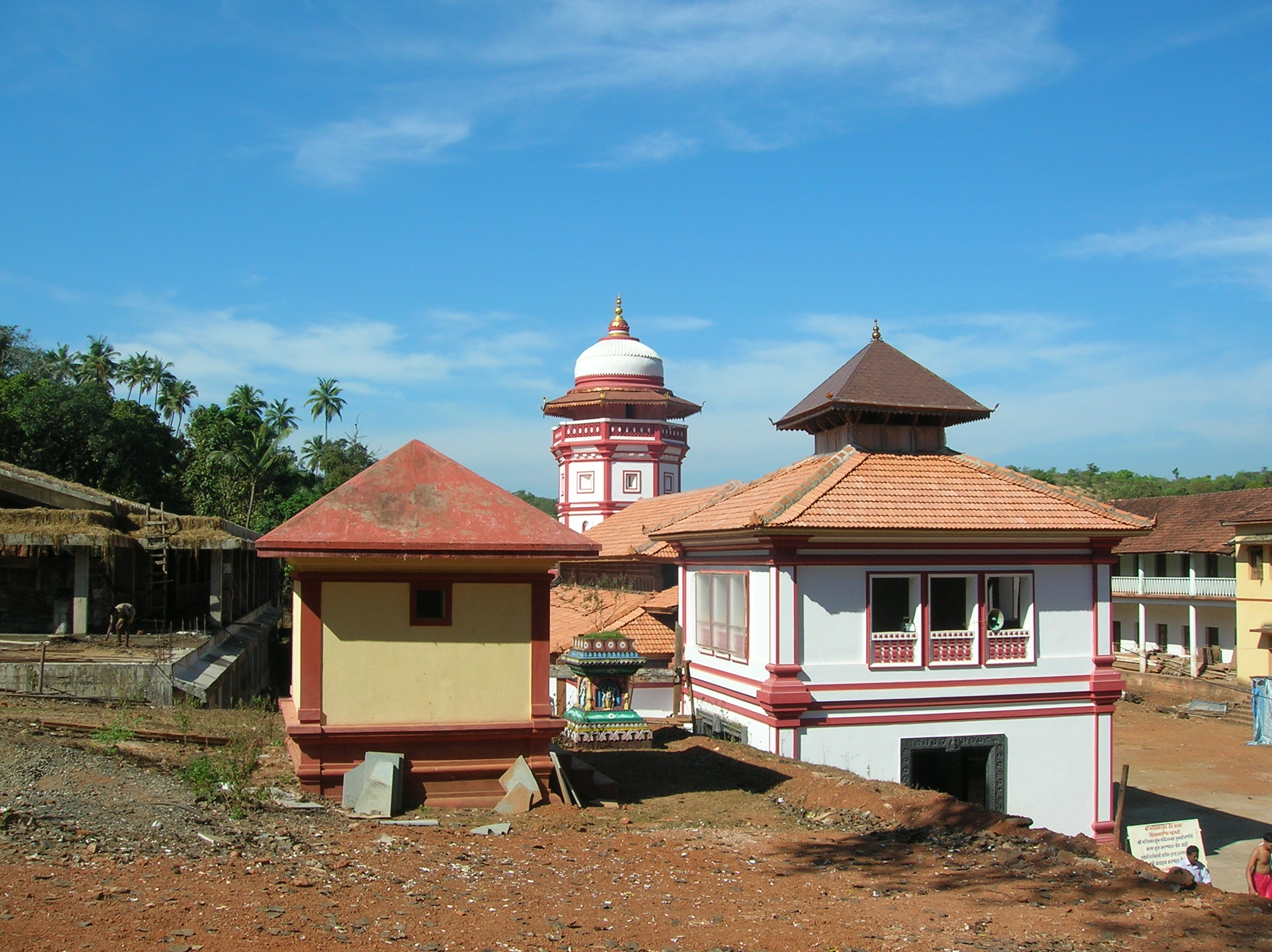
- Mallikarjuna Temple, Canacona, Goa

- Location in Goa Mallikarjuna Temple, Goa (India)

Religion
- Affiliation: Hinduism
- District: South Goa
- Deity: Mallikarjuna, incarnation of Shiva
- Festivals: Shisharani, Jatra, Veeramel, Avatar purush

Location
- Location: Canacona
- State: Goa
- Country: India
- Interactive map of Mallikarjuna Temple
- Coordinates: 15.0221286°N 74.0768208°E

Architecture
- Creator: Ancestors of the Kshatriya Samaj
- Completed: 16th Century

Specifications
- Temple: 1
- Monument: 2

The Mallikarjuna Temple is a hindu temple dedicated to Mallikarjun, an incarnation of Shiva which is situated in the Sristhal village that is 7 km northeast of Chaudi in Canacona taluk in the South Goa district of Goa, India. The shrine is known to be one of the oldest in Goa and is situated amidst natural surroundings in a valley completely surrounded by mountains. The temple is believed to be constructed during the middle of the 16th century, as per the writing on a plaque near the temple dome, by ancestors of the Kshatriya samaj. It was refurbished in the year 1778. The main deity of the temple is referred to as Advat Sinhasanadheeshwara Mahapati by his devotees. His consort is referred to as Devati.

There are about 14 Mallikarjuna shrines spread over Goa. The striking similarity in these shrines is that all idols are in cylindrical shape and covered with metallic masks accompanied by Trishula. These cylindrical shaped wooden idols are known as Nirakar(formless) by the local population. These idols probably point to the era when Natha Sampradaya was prominent in the Western Deccan region. The lingas are believed to be Swaymbhu lingas. According to the records two ancient shrines of Mallikarjun existed in Bardez at Assgao and Pomburpa which were demolished by the Portuguese.

The temple has around 60 Hindu deities and it celebrates a number of festivals with the annual jatra being the most unusual amongst most of the festivals in Goa. The temple also celebrates the festivals of Rathasaptami and Shigmotsav which attract a number of devotees.

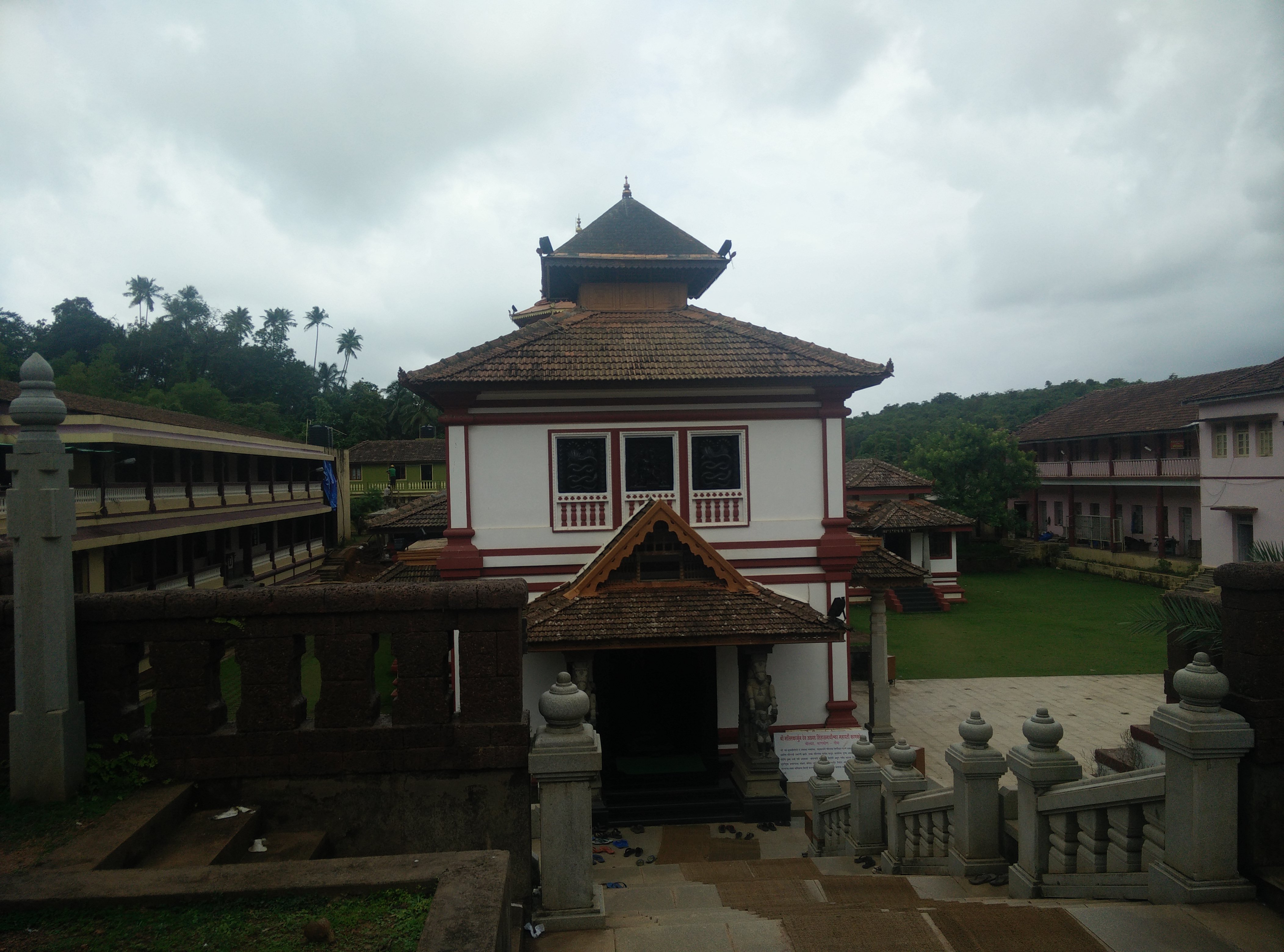
Temple dedicate to Lord Shiva.

== Legend ==
Legend has it that the location of the temple was the place where Lord Shiva united with his consort Parvati after a long period of separation. Another source mentions that the demon Malla was fighting with one of the Pandava brothers, Arjuna. Shiva assumed the form of a hunter and killed Malla and saved Arjuna and hence the name ‘Mallikarjun'. The temple is also known as Adavat Sinhasanadhishwar Mahapati Canacona among the locals.

The Linga is believed to be Swayambhu lingam, uncovered by a member of the Kunbi community while clearing the forest and it is a cylindrical shaped uncut stone covered with a metallic mask.

== History of the temple Mahajans ==
The temple is believed to be constructed during the middle of the 16th century, as per the writing on a plaque near the temple dome, by ancestors of the Kshatriya samaj who descended from the royal Surve family from Prachitgad near Shringarpur of Ratnagiri district of Maharashtra.

This Kankunkar clan was founded by prince Kashi Purush and his band of brothers who founded the various Gharwais under Shristhal, Canacona. They were escaping from Mahmud Gawan's wrath after his father switched loyalties from Bahamani to Vijayanagara. Since Goa's Goud Saraswat Brahmins were known to work for Vijaynagara they chose to settle in Canacona. RaoRana Shurveer Suryarao(Suryaji) Surve who was respected and valued by Shivaji despite being his adversary belonged to the family that stayed back at Shringarpur after the scuffle with Mahmud Gawan and hence was extremely loyal to the Bahamanis.

== Temple architecture ==
The temple with its beautiful wood and silver carvings is reputed to have been erected by Habu Brahmins of the Dravidian dynasty. One can see some of the finest surviving art on the six pillars in the mantapa or the assembly hall. One of the wooden pillars in the mandapa is used as the oracle pillar in the temple. These pillars have intricate carvings with scenes from the Puranas and Mahabharat. On either side of the doors leading to the inner sanctum one can see beautifully carved silhouettes of the doorkeepers or dwarpal.

== Daily rituals ==
The daily worship is performed by Brahmin priest only for a certain designated period and during the rest of the period, the Kunbi priests namely Velip and Zalmi perform the daily worship. The ritual of hunting is associated with some of the Mallikarjuna shrines.

== Festivals ==
Shisharani: This typical ritual alternates every year with the Veeramel celebration held at the time of the traditional Shigmo festival. The word Shisharani is supposed to mean a cooking place on top of a human head. This ritual involves cooking rice in an earthenware kept on the head of three men who sleep on the ground with their heads touching each other and fire is lit between the heads to cook the rice. The heads are covered with wet cloth and layers of plantain trunk.After which a cut is made on the head of another person and the blood is put into the vessel.This happens every alternate year.

Jatra: The annual festival (Jatra) held at the temple is quite unique among the temple festivals of Goa. Early morning on the day of the festival, the idol of the deity is taken out in a procession which travels for almost 2–3 hours to reach the nearby Rajbag beach. A number of rituals including a special bath for the deity are held at the beach, after which the deity is taken back to the temple. Hundreds of devotees have a holy bath at the same time on the seashore.

Veeramel: This celebration is held once every two years at the time of the traditional Shigmo festival. During this celebration which occurs close to midnight, selected local youth who are called Gade, rush from house to house with swords in their hands followed by people with drums and other musical instruments.

Avatar Purush: These are actually smaller deities called Avatar Purush located at three nearby places: Asali, Khalvade and Bhatpal where they are worshipped. But once a year, they are taken in a magnificent procession at night to the main temple at Sristhal.

Besides these, the temple celebrates a number of common Goan festivals like the Rathasaptami and Shigmo.
