= Loliem-Polem =

- Village
- Location in Goa, India Loliem-Polem (India)
- Coordinates: 14.90°N 74.09°E
- Country: India
- State: Goa
- District: Kushavati district

Languages
  - Official: Konkani
- Time zone: UTC+5:30 (IST)
- PIN: 403728
- Telephone code: 91-08346-XXX XXX
- Vehicle registration: GA
- Nearest city: Karwar
- Website: goa.gov.in

Loliem-Polem is a village located in the southernmost tip of the Canacona taluk, in Goa, India, bordering Karwar taluka of Karnataka state.

== Location ==
Loliem-Polem is surrounded by Karwar Taluk towards south, Quepem Taluk towards north, Salcete Taluk towards north.

== History ==
Loliem, earlier under the Kadamba kings of Banavasi, was actually known as Loha-halli (a Kannada word) as the village had metallurgical artisans who would manufacture idols of Hindu gods and goddesses by using iron and aluminium according to the Canara Gazetteer. Later, it became a Portuguese colony and the name was changed to Loliem.

Loliem-Polem had a Portuguese immigration check-post to monitor all arrivals-departures by road route staffed by European officers till 1961, when Goa was incorporated into the Indian Union.

== Geography ==
Loliem comprises seven wards (village segments) -- namely, Iddar, Karay, Kajalker, Shelli, Polem, Peddem and Maxem. For administrative purpose, the wards of Shell and Peddem are divided into two parts each, thus forming a total of nine wards.

== Polem beach ==
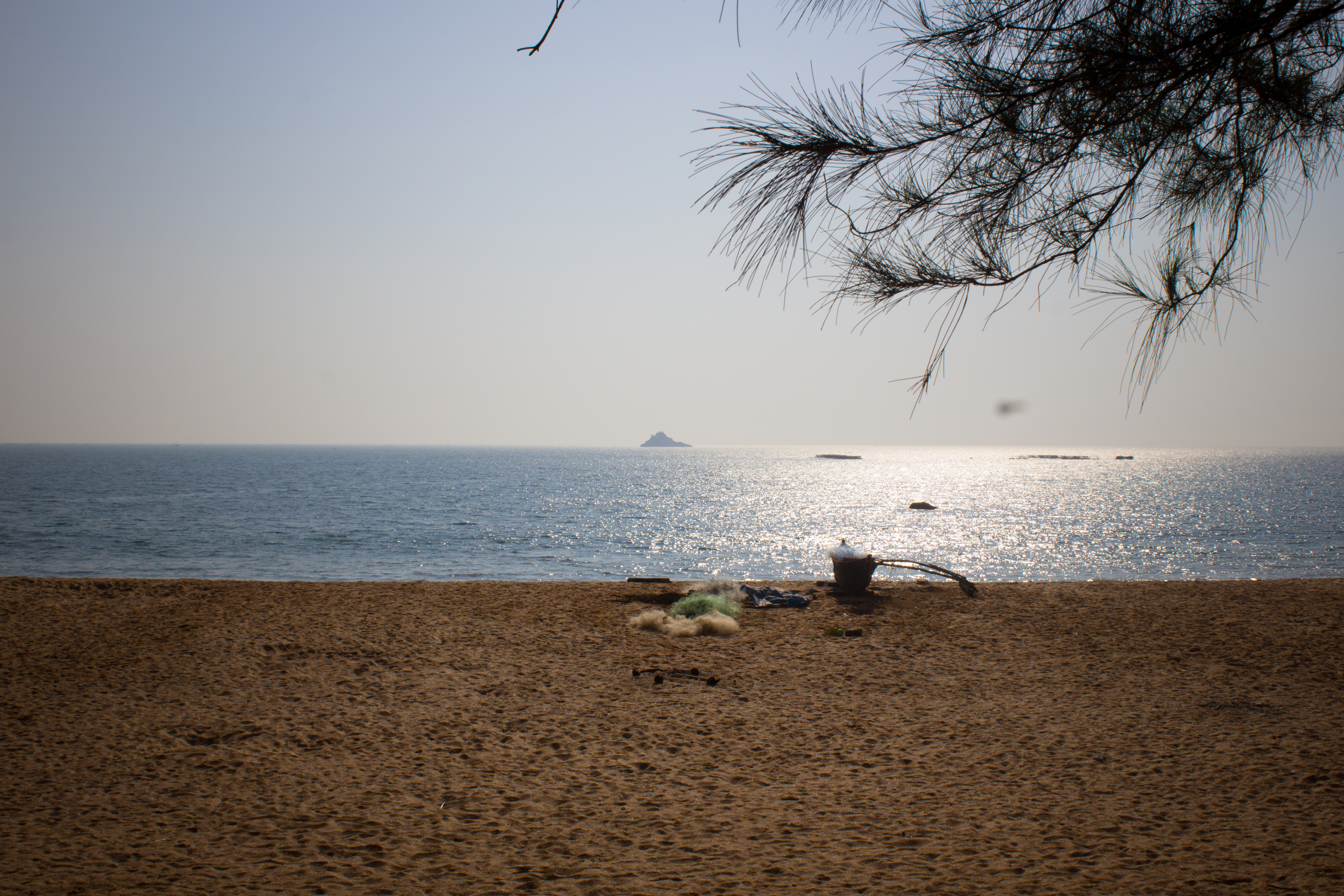
Polem beach

Polem beach is located in the village, it is a popular tourist attraction. Trek to Moon beach and Dabel beach start from this beach.

== Achievements ==
- Loliem-Polem has been adjudged the best panchayat in the Goa state and in the country twice during the last panchayat term.
- Union ministry of Human resources development (MHRD) inspected a site in Loliem to set up the Indian Institute of Technology (IIT), Goa. The three-member team to inspect the Loliem site for the IIT Goa, found the plot to be meeting all the necessary criteria. The IIT Goa campus will resemble a modern, mini township, which will be constructed in a manner that retains the greenery around. When the IIT has come up, a lot of development will taken place, generating self-employment opportunities for the locals. Land approximately 280 acres or 11.2 lakh sq ms was shortlisted by an MHRD team over Shristhal and Poinguinim in Canacona. As of June 2016, however, news reports stated that a local citizens' committee had opposed the siting of an IIT campus in their village.

As of 2021 the IIT campus has been moved away from loliem after heavy opposition from the locals.

== Reaching there ==
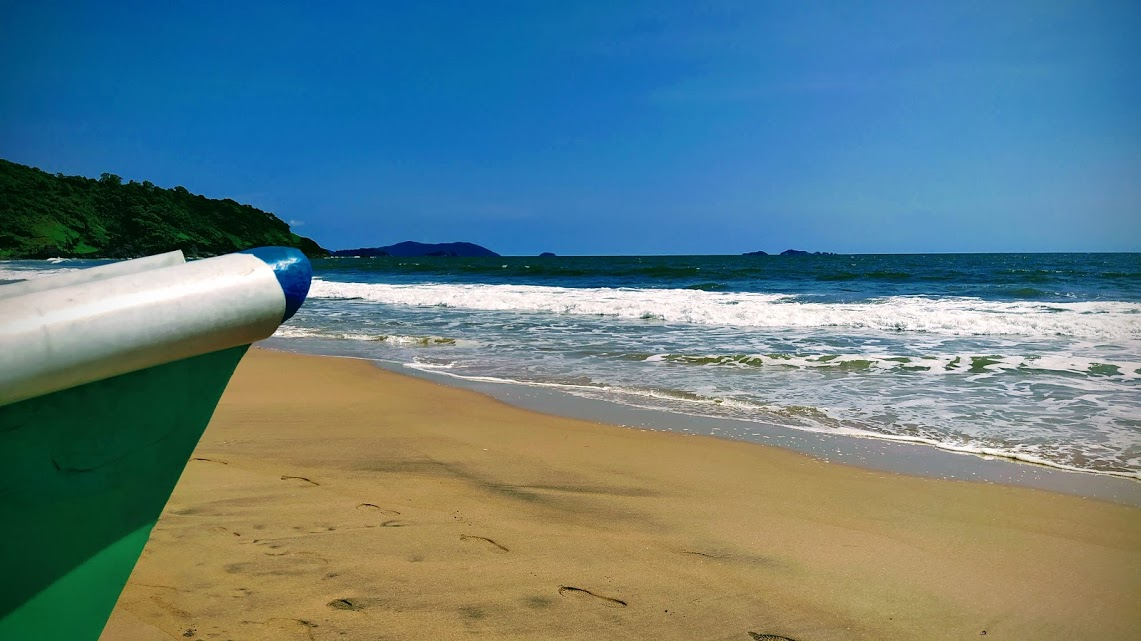
Polem Beach with Karnataka visible

- By road: It is located 37 km towards south from district headquarters Margao, 70 km from state capital Panaji.
- By train: The railway station at Loliem falls under the jurisdiction of the Konkan Railway. It is the last station in Goa before Asnoti railway station of Karnataka state. The other two railway stations falling under Canacona Taluka on Konkan Railway route before Loliem-Polem are Balli, Canacona.

Next 'Small' station towards Mumbai: Canacona	Konkan Railway : Railway (India)	Next 'Small' station from Mumbai: Asnoti
Next 'Small' station towards Mumbai: Canacona	Distance from Mumbai(CST) =	Next 'Small' station from Mumbai: Asnoti
Next 'Main' station towards Mumbai: Madgaon	Konkan Railway : Railway (India)	Next 'Main' station from Mumbai: Karwar
