= Fatorpa =

- village
- Location in Goa, India Fatorpa (India)
- Coordinates: 15°7′0″N 74°0′0″E
- Country: India
- State: Goa
- District: Kushavati district
- Elevation: 147 m (482 ft)

Languages
  - Official: Konkani
- Time zone: UTC+5:30 (IST)
- Vehicle registration: GA
- Coastline: 0 kilometres (0 mi)
- Website: goa.gov.in

Fatorpa is a village in Quepem taluk, Kushavati district, Goa. There are two famous temples of Shree Shantadurga in this Village.

== Geography ==
It is located at an elevation of 147 m above MSL.

== Location ==
Nearest Mail/Express Trains main railway station is at Margao. Nearest Passenger/Shuttle/Local Trains railway station is at Bali.

== Places of interest ==
- Shri Shantadurga Temple
- Shri Mahamaya Temple
