= Poinguinim =

Village in Goa, India

- Coordinates: 14°58′N 74°05′E
- Country: India
- State: Goa
- Subdivision: Canacona taluka

Poinguinim is a village in the Canacona taluka in the Kushavati district,Goa,India near the Goa-Karnataka border, and close to the Cotigao Wildlife Sanctuary. The village is home to a population of 6,625 people as of the 2011 census.

The name of the village derives from poi, a strip of low-lying land along a river or sea, or a narrow inlet that floods in high tide, and guim or guine, meaning low-lying area.

== See also ==
- Majali
- Sadishivgarh
- Karwar
- Ankola
