= Cotigao Wildlife Sanctuary =

Wildlife sanctuary in India

Coordinates: 14.976°N 74.206°E

- IUCN category IV (habitat/species management area)
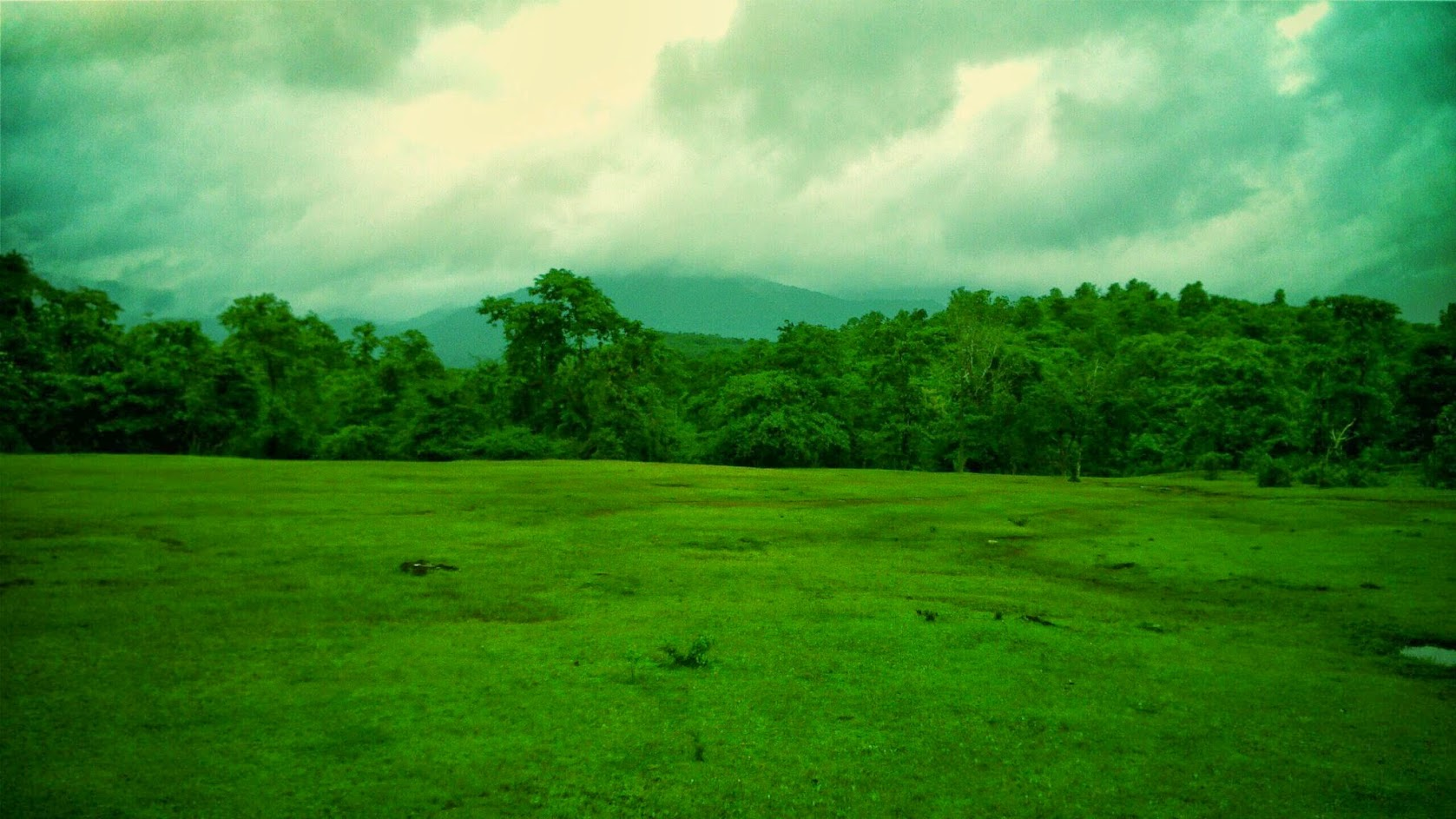

- Location within Goa Location within India
- Interactive map of Cotigao Wildlife Sanctuary
- Location: Canacona, Kushavati district, Goa
- Area: 85.65 km^{2} (33.07 sq mi)
- Established: 1968

The Cotigao Wildlife Sanctuary is located in Canacona Taluka, Kushavati district, of Goa, India, established in 1968. There is an eco-tourism complex at the entrance of the sanctuary that houses a nature interpretation centre, cottages, toilets, library, reception area, rescue centre, canteen, children's park, and forest ranger office.

The sanctuary is known for its dense forest of tall trees, some of which reach 30 metres in height. The forest supports moist deciduous trees, semi-evergreen trees, and evergreen trees. A special feature of the sanctuary is a treetop watchtower positioned 25 metres above a watering hole where animals go to drink. The best times to visit the watchtower are dawn and dusk when animals are most likely to be visiting.

Animals in the sanctuary include the flying squirrel, slender loris, Indian pangolin, mouse deer, four-horned antelope, Malabar pit viper, hump-nosed pit viper, white-bellied woodpecker, Malabar trogon, velvet-fronted nuthatch, heart-spotted woodpecker, speckled piculet, Malayan bittern, draco or flying lizard, golden-back gliding snake, and Malabar tree toad. Eight nature trails traverse the sanctuary, ranging from 500 metres to 5 kilometres long. Several tribal groups live in and around the sanctuary including the Velip and the Kunbil. Visitors can interact with these communities to learn about their culture and lifestyle.
