= Asnoti railway station =

Railway station in Karnataka, India

General information
- Coordinates: 14.8763°N 74.1476°E
- Owner: Indian Railways
- Line: Konkan Railway
- Platforms: 1
- Tracks: 1

Other information
- Status: Active
- Station code: AT

Services
Preceding station	Indian Railways	Following station
Loliem towards Roha	Konkan Railway Konkan Railway	Karwar towards Thokur
Route map
Location
- Location within Karnataka

Asnoti railway station is a station on Konkan Railway in Uttara Kannada district of Karnataka state, Republic of India (Bharat). It is at a distance of 493.221 km (306.5 mi) down from origin. Asnoti railway station lies on the north bank of river Kali. The preceding station on the line is Loliem railway station and the next station is Karwar railway station. Asnoti railway station is the north most train station in Karnataka on Konkan railway line.
