= Dharbandora taluka =

Dharbandora Konkani: Dharbandode
- Taluka
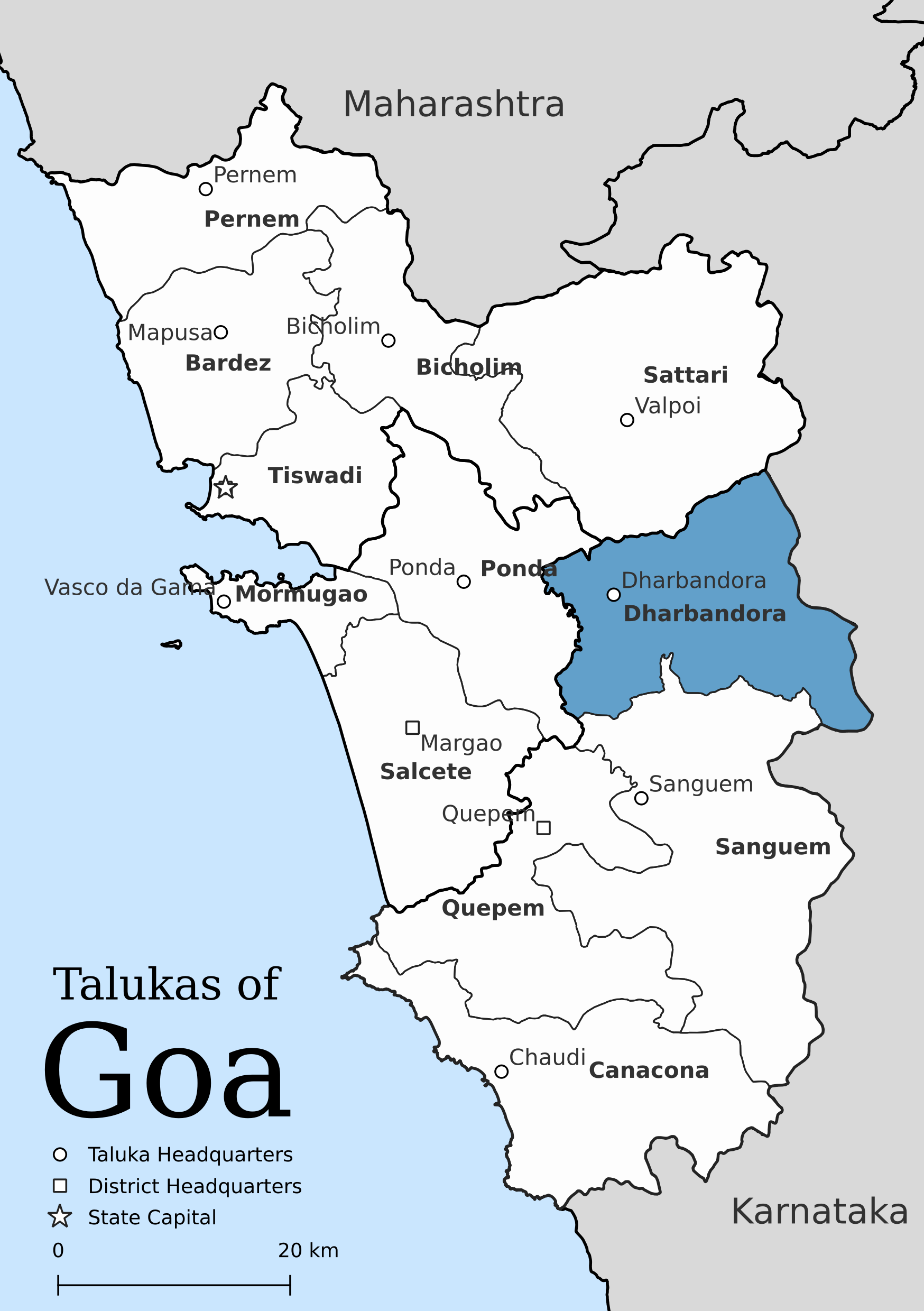
- Location of Dharbandora taluka in Goa
- Coordinates: 15.385259°N 74.117948°E
- Country: India
- State: Goa
- District: Kushavati district
- Carved out of Sanguem: 4 April 2011
- Headquarters: Dharbandora
- Major villages: List: Aglote Bandoli Codli Collem Caranzol Camarconda Cormonem Dharbandora Moissal Mollem Piliem Sancordem Sangod Sigao Sonauli Surla

Government
  - Deputy Collector: Ramesh P. Naik
  - Mamlatdar: Pravinjay Pandit
  - Lok Sabha constituency: -
  - Assembly constituency: Sanvordem
  - MLA: Ganesh Gaonkar

Population (2012)
  - Taluka: 30,000 to 40,000
  - Urban: 20%

Demographics
  - Literacy rate: 67%
  - Sex ratio: 840
- PIN: 4034XX, 4037XX
- Vehicle registration: GA-12
- Rain: Average of 500 mm to 750 mm
- Website: goa.gov.in

Dharbandora is a taluka in the Kushavati district of Goa state, India, with an estimated population of 30,000 to 40,000.

== History ==
The creation of a new Dharbandora Taluka, the 12th Taluka in Goa, was announced by the Chief Minister of Goa Digambar Kamat on 25 March 2010, in his budget speech before the Goa Legislative Assembly. A Committee chaired by the Revenue Minister of Goa Jose Philip D'Souza steered the creation of the Taluka.

By a 16 March 2011 notification, the Government of Goa notified the 18 villages of Aglote, Bandoli, Camarconda, Caranzol, Codli, Colem, Cormonem, Darbandora, Gangem, Molem, Moissal, Piliem, Sancordem, Sangod, Sigao, Sonauli, Surla and Usgao to incorporate the Dharbandora Taluka. Gangem and Usgao were carved out from Ponda taluka while all the remaining villages were earlier a part of the Sanguem Taluka. However, there was resistance from the people of Gangem and Usgao villages against the decision of including both villages in the Dharbandora Taluka. Vide another notification dated 20 May 2011, the villages of Gangem and Usgao were reverted to Ponda taluka.

Dharbandora Taluka came into existence as a part of the South Goa district on 4 April 2011. Satish R. Prabhu was the first Mamlatdar of the Dharbandora Taluka.

== Administration ==
Dharbandora is a Sub Division headed by the Deputy Collector of Dharbandora. The Dharbandora Taluka is headed by the Mamlatdar and there also exists a Joint Mamlatdar. The Taluka also has other offices such as the Block Development Office, Zonal Agricultural Office, Regional Transport Office, Civil Registrar-cum-Sub-Registrar, etc. The Government of Goa has already notified a new Sub-Treasury Office for Dharbandora, however, the same has not yet been established.

A new Government Office Building Complex has been built in Dharbandora which will house all the government offices in Dharbandora.

== Census Data 2011 ==
There is no reliable data for the demographics and literacy rate in this new Sub-Division of Goa. The primary reason is that it came into existence after the 2011 census.

== Tourism ==
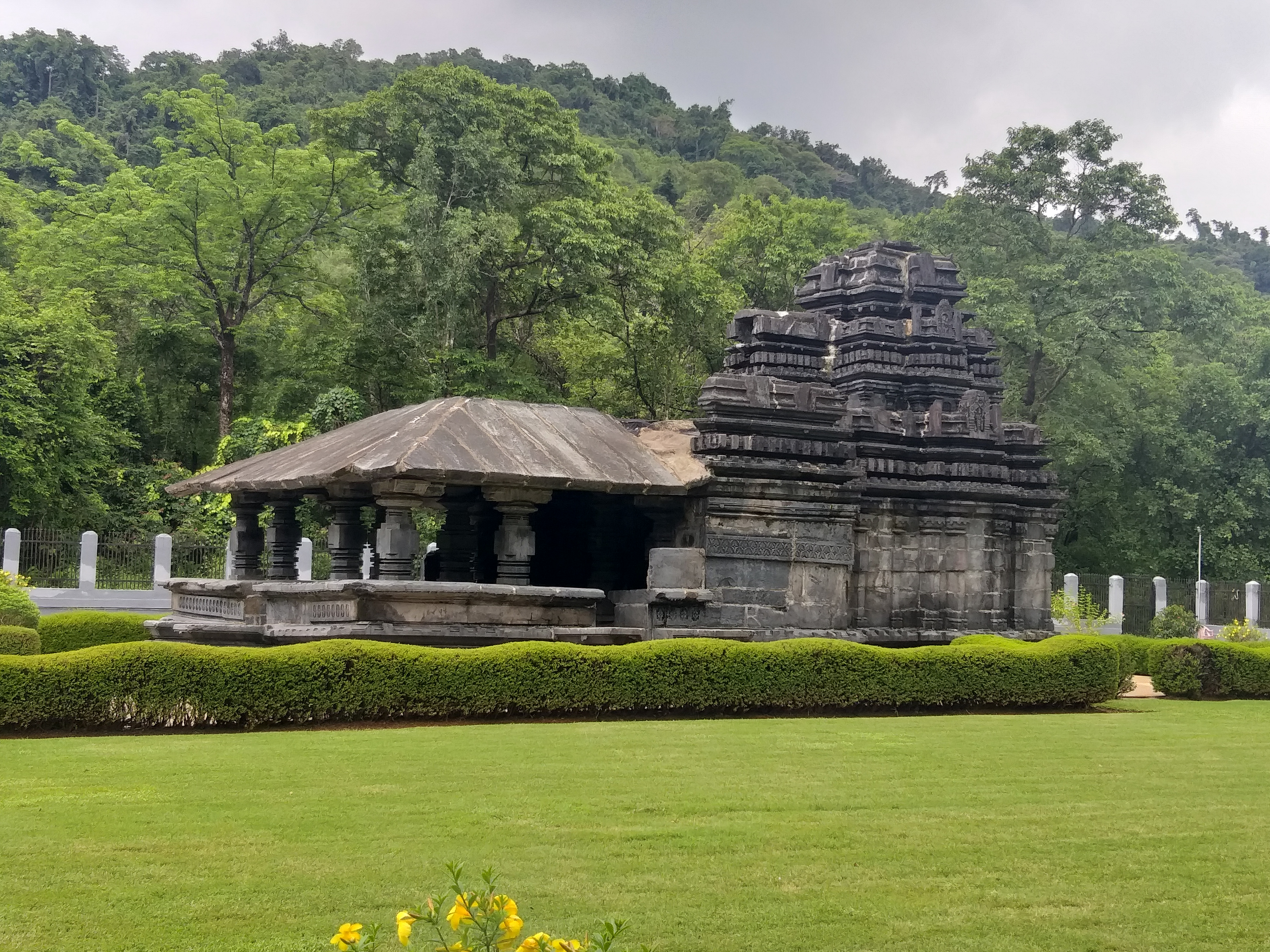
Mahadev Temple of Tambdi Surla

The famous Dudhsagar Falls on the Mandovi River are in Mollem. The Bhagwan Mahaveer Sanctuary and Mollem National Park are also situated in the Dharbandora Taluka. There are many ecotourism sites in Dharbandora. The Biodiversity Park at Mollem and the Satpal arboretum are prominent.

Dharbandora Taluka is also home to prominent temples like the Mahadev Temple, Tambdi Surla and the Barabhumi Temples. The Cave at Sigao is a protected monument.
