= Agonda =

- Village
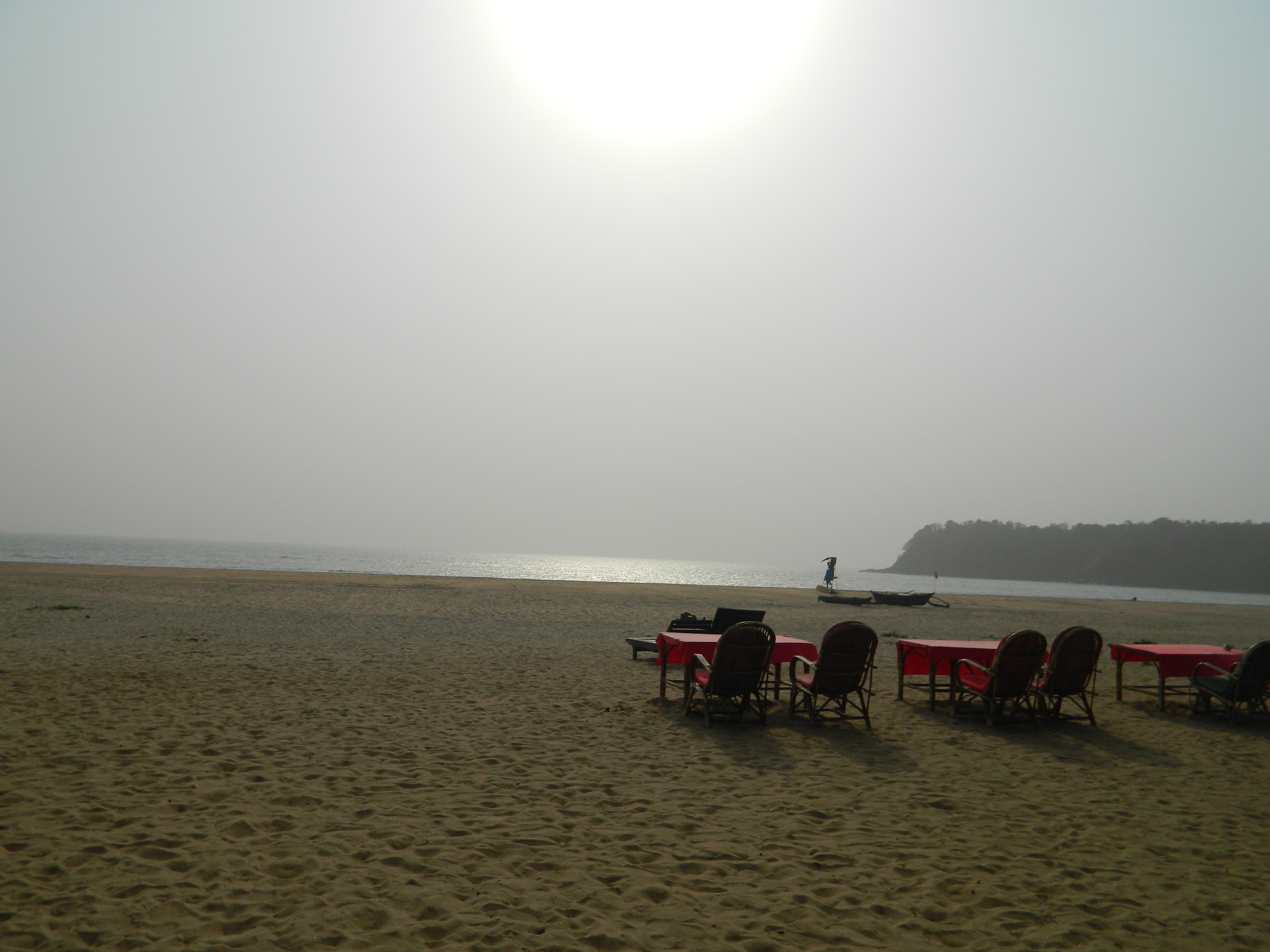

- Location of Agonda in Goa Agonda (India)
- Coordinates: 15.04030°N 73.98648°E
- Country: India
- State: Goa
- District: Kushavati district
- Sub-district: Canacona

Government
  - Type: Panchayat

Population (2011)
  - Total: 3,801

Languages
  - Official: Konkani
- Time zone: UTC+05:30 (IST)
- Vehicle registration: GA

Agonda is a large village located in Canacona in Kushavati district, India. It is famous for its beach and is one of the only four beaches designated as turtle nesting sites under the Coastal Regulation Zone 2011 notification.

== Demographics ==
As of the 2011 India census, Agonda had a population of 3801. Males constituted 47% of the population and females 53%. The average sex ratio of Agonda village is 1110 which is higher than Goa state average of 973. Agonda had an average literacy rate of 86.11%, higher than the national average of 74.04%: male literacy was 91.47% and female literacy 81.26%. 10.42% of the population was under 6 years of age.

== Agonda beach ==
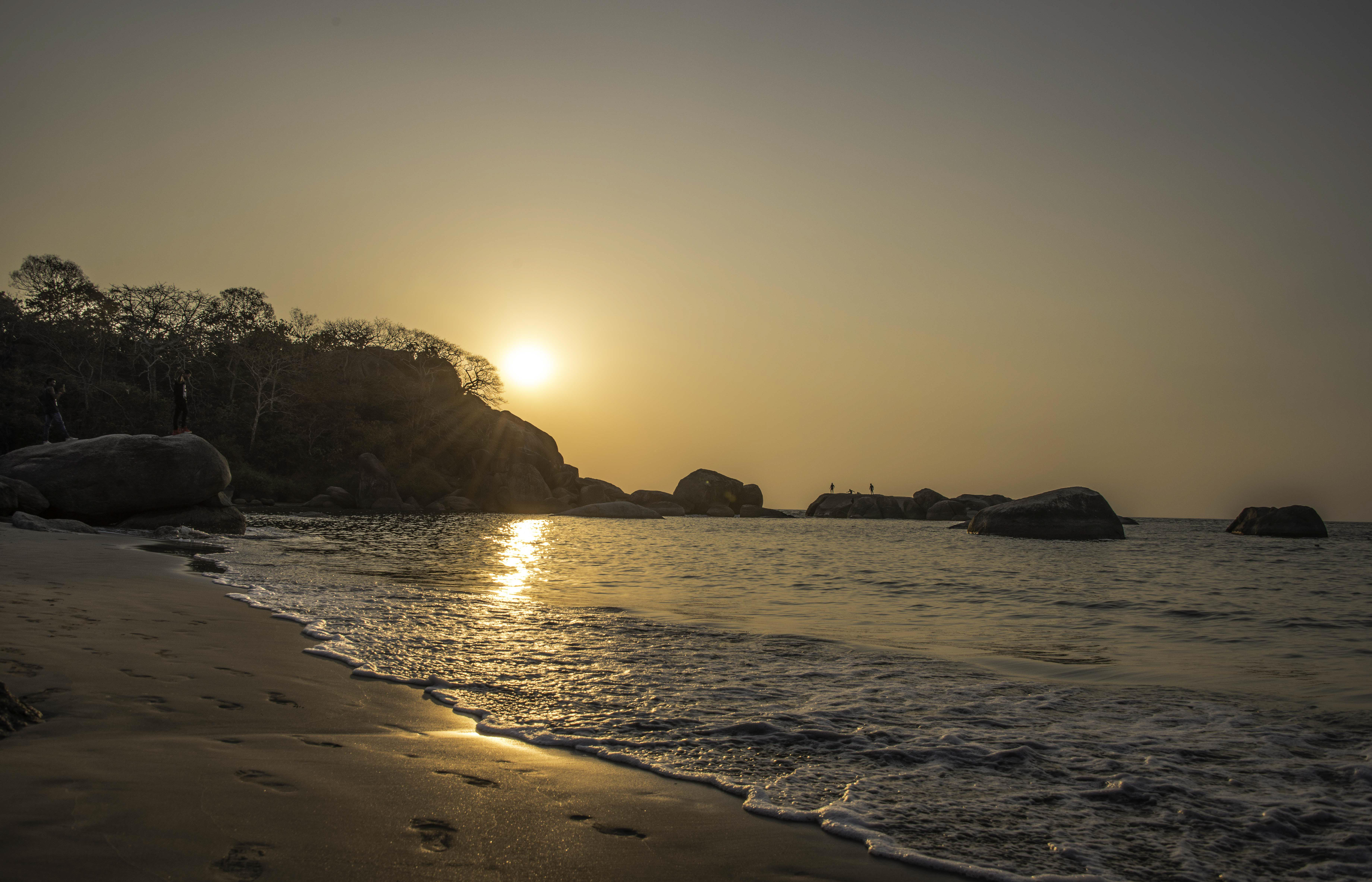
Sunset at Agonda beach

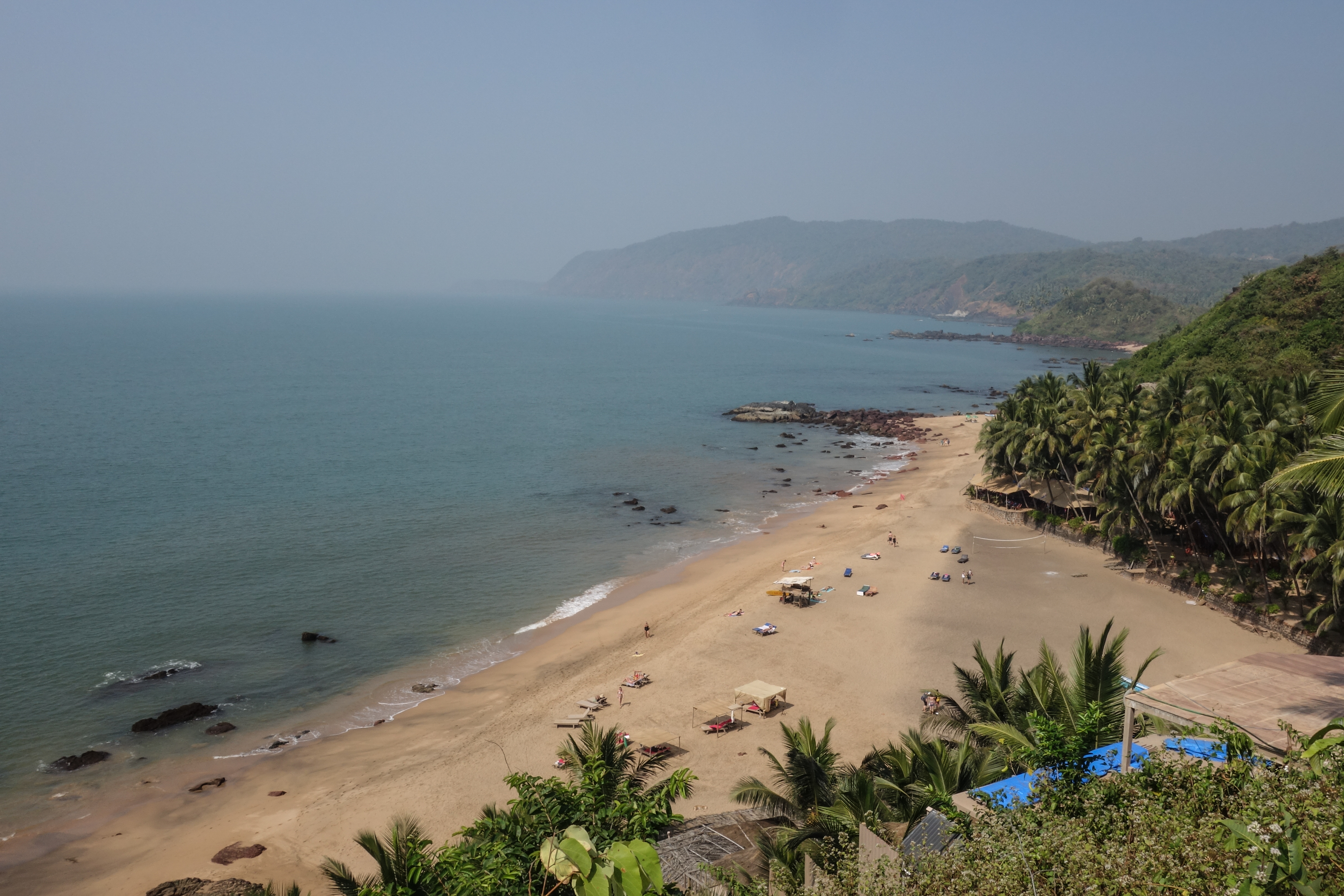
Cola beach, north of Agonda. Jan '19

Agonda Beach is a 3 km long public beach located in Agonda village in Goa, India, about 9.2 kilometres (5.7 mi) north of Palolem Beach in Kushavati district, and about an hour from Margao. There is one more beach on the north side of Agonda cliff called Cola beach which has an adjoining lagoon.

During the month of September, the beach serves as a nesting ground for olive ridley sea turtles.

In 2016, it was ranked on TripAdvisor's "Travelers Choice" as fourth in Asia by Tripadvisor 2016 and first in India.
