= Robert S. Newman =

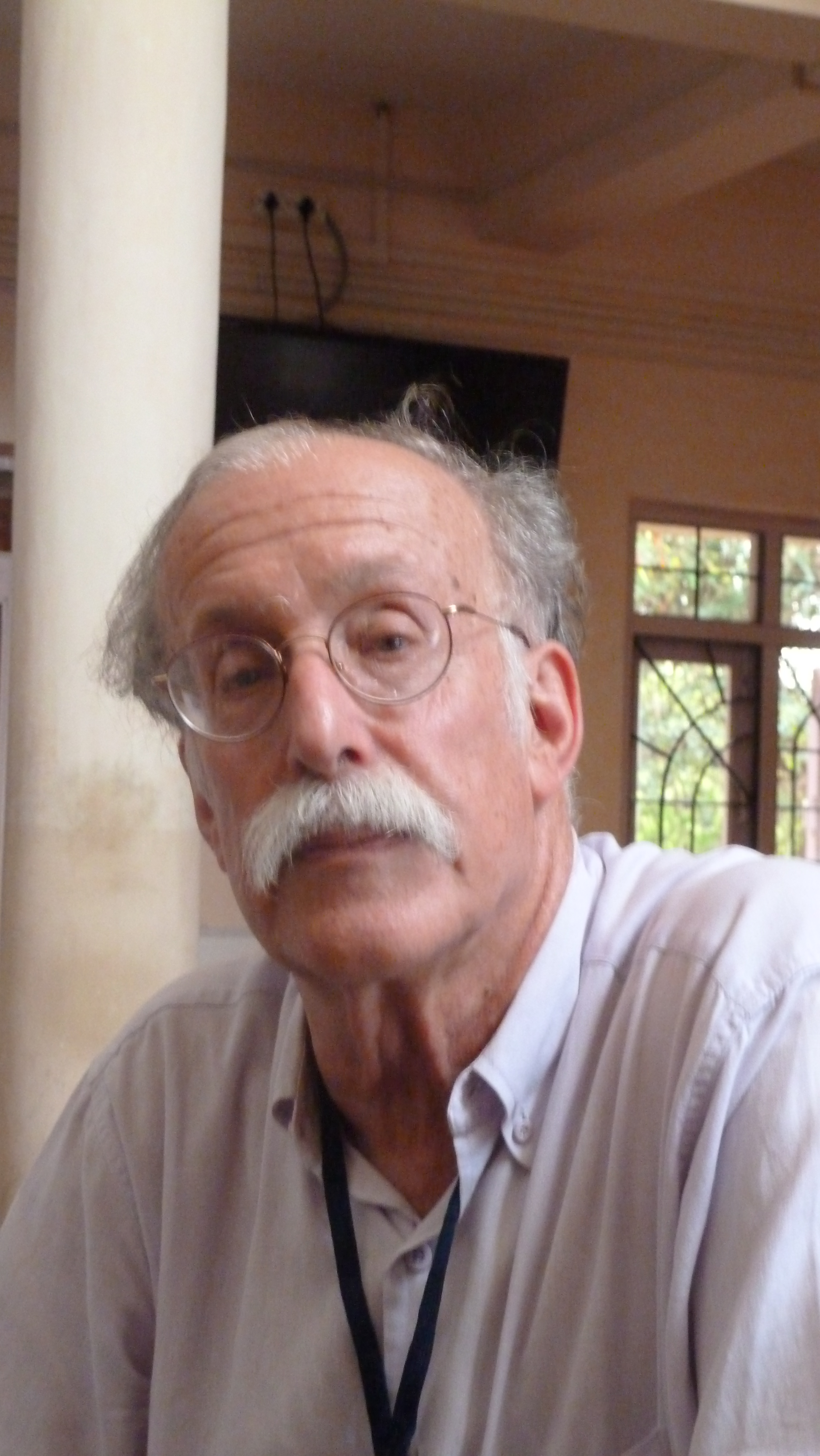
Newman in 2011

Robert S. Newman (born February 12, 1943) is an Americal anthropologist. He is primarily known for his contribution to studying post-1961 Goa, India.

== Early life and education ==
Newman was born Robert Samuel Newman in Boston, Massachusetts, and grew up in Marblehead, Massachusetts, the son of Morris M. Newman and Ethel Solmer Newman, both children of Jewish immigrants from the Russian Empire. Music was his first love, but it turned out to be a short one. A chance to be an exchange student in Japan in 1959, turned Newman towards Asia and he earned his B.A. in Asian Studies from Cornell University in 1964. He then went to India as a Peace Corps volunteer.

== Early anthropology work ==
Before the Peace Corps, he worked briefly in Honduras in 1964 with a Cornell project. In the Peace Corps he worked two years in Lucknow at Literacy House, learned Hindustani, and married an Indian woman, Sudha Dubey. Returning to Cornell, he pursued higher degrees in a combination of Organizational Behavior and Anthropology. After short stints teaching at the University of Chicago and SUNY Cortland in 1973, Newman immigrated to Australia with his wife to start teaching at La Trobe University in Melbourne.

He had long wished to study Goa, and after a serendipitous visit in 1965, he found his chance. He was able to begin research there in 1978 and returned many times over the next 12 years. During this period, he also taught in Xi'an, China, and at Yonsei University in Seoul, South Korea. Newman remained at La Trobe University until 1989, when he returned to Marblehead to start a new life in an old place. He wound up teaching English as a Second Language in the immigrant community from the former Soviet Union, but continued working on Goa, publishing a book and several more articles, attending conferences.

== Goa work ==
Newman was the first to apply modern anthropological theory and writing to the study of Goan society, his main arguments being that Goa has never been part of Portugal, but rather a slightly Lusitanized region of India and that Goan culture must be seen as a synthesis which formed a Hindu-Catholic one. A second conclusion is that the same "Green Revolution" process that increased grain production in India, was also successfully applied to fishing in Goa (and elsewhere in India) but that the human and ecological price paid has been extremely high. Overall, he attempts to show that popular religion in Goa, as separate from the classical versions of Catholicism and Hinduism, is a rich synthesis of the two in which goddesses can be seen (for example) as either Shantadurga or Our Lady, in which Hindus attend certain Catholic feast day ceremonies and Catholics make donations to Hindu temples. He especially studied the region in southern Salcete district where such activity is common.

Newman argues that in Goa, as in such places as Mexico, Peru, Brazil, the Philippines, and Mauritius, contact between two or more civilizations created a "fascinating synthesis". He says this synthesis is "one that had been steadfastly slighted by anthropologists, who wanted to study "pure" India, whatever that may be!" In line with this argument, he did a stint of research in Mauritius in 1987, concentrating on popular Hinduism in its various aspects among the "overseas Indians" there.

== Writings ==
Newman's original field work in Lucknow, Uttar Pradesh, India, resulted in a book "Grassroots Education in India", published by Sterling (New Delhi) in 1989. That book looks at the organizational effectiveness of three primary schools in Lucknow District: a typical village school, a Muslim maktab, and a middle class, urban school run by Christian Brothers. Newman has written other articles on the nexus of education and culture in North India, Muslim education, Indian Jews, Hindi films, a comparison of the Vietnamese and Cambodian revolutions, the transformation of knowledge in Albania, and on extension education and approaches to agricultural development.

Newman has written a wide variety of articles on Goa. Many of them were combined in his book Of Umbrellas, Goddesses and Dreams which is published by the Mapusa (Goa)-based Other India Press. In 2019, he published in two volumes: "Goan Anthropology: Festivals, Films and Fish", and "Goan Anthropology: Mothers, Miracles and Mythology" at Goa, 1556 Press. These volumes contain almost all of the previous work plus a number of new chapters, new bibliography and new introductions.

He is a semi-professional photographer and has had 15 one-man exhibitions over the last 30 years, selling hundreds of prints.
