= Khola =

Coordinates: 16.8861°S 67.7119°W

- Town
- Interactive map of Khola
- Country: Bolivia
- Time zone: UTC-4 (BOT)

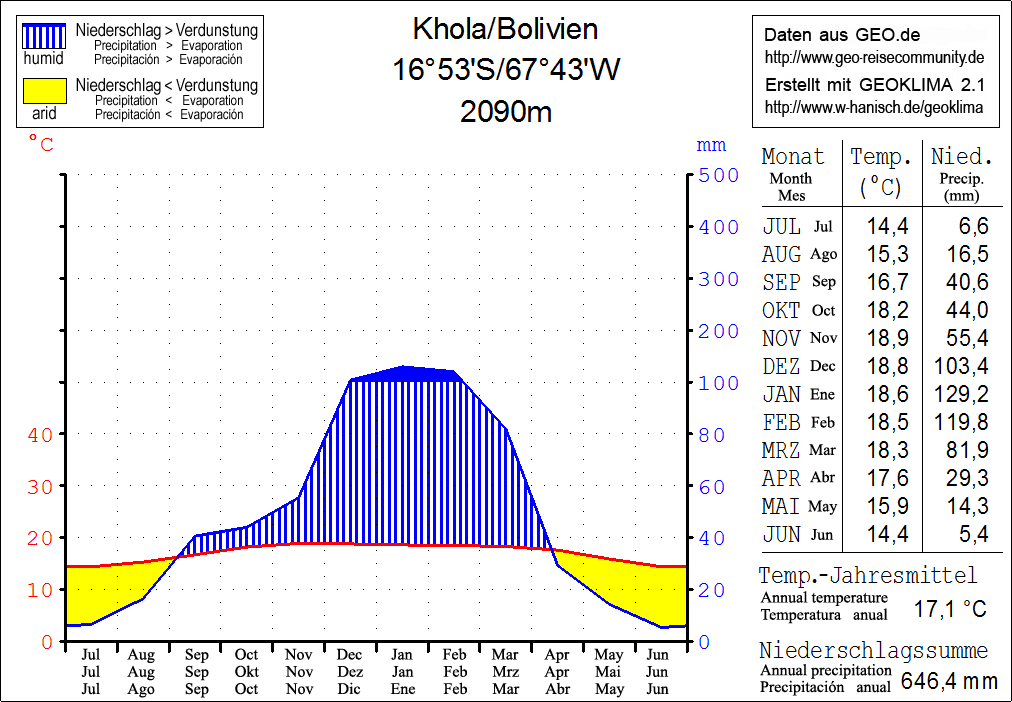
Khola Climate chart

Khola is a small town in Bolivia.

== See also ==
- Khola Gaon, is a village in Bangladesh
- Khola gotra
