= Asnoti =

- Village
- Location in Karnataka, India Asnoti (India)
- Coordinates: 14°52′54″N 74°9′2″E
- Country: India
- State: Karnataka
- District: Uttara Kannada

Languages
  - Official: Kannada
- Time zone: UTC+5:30 (IST)
- Nearest city: Karwar

Asnoti is a village in Karwar Taluka, Uttara Kannada district, Karnataka, India. It is close to the historic fort of Sadashivgad located on Kali river. Konkani is spoken as a local language.

Due to the presence of the railway station it caters to the neighbouring villages of Thoralebag, Hodlebag, Sadashivagad, Angadi and also to the township of Kaiga, Mallapur; though the public transport facilities from the station are not up to the mark, as it is a wayside station.

Margao-Karwar (DMU), Verna-Mangalore passenger trains and few special trains halt at Asnoti.

== Location ==
Asnoti is near Karwar. The wayside railway station at Asnoti falls under the jurisdiction of the Konkan Railway. It is the first station when one enters Karnataka state from Goa. The other two railway stations falling under Karwar Taluka on Konkan Railway route after Asnoti are Karwar (Shirwad), Harwada.

It is located about 25 km from Canacona Railway Station. Karwar Railway Station is further 11 km to the south of Asnoti.

== Demographics ==
Asnoti has few areas (Wadas) within a range of 3 km. The biggest area (Wada) is Madhe wada. Madhe wada is base of people with surname Salunke. It so named because it is at the center of the village. The other area (Wada) is Sawant Wada. This area is mainly occupied by people with surname Sawant & Asnotkar. Desai Wada is the other area (Wada) where the majority residents are people with surname Desai. Similarly Bhagat Wada for Bhagats. Maddamakki for Nagekars etc. Asnoti is a village with a population of more than 10000 people & hence has a Gram Panchayat of its own. The majority community of this village is Konkan Marathas, the other communities include the Parti/Padti. All the surnames Asnotkar, Salunke, Sawant, Desai, Nagekar, etc. belongs to this community.

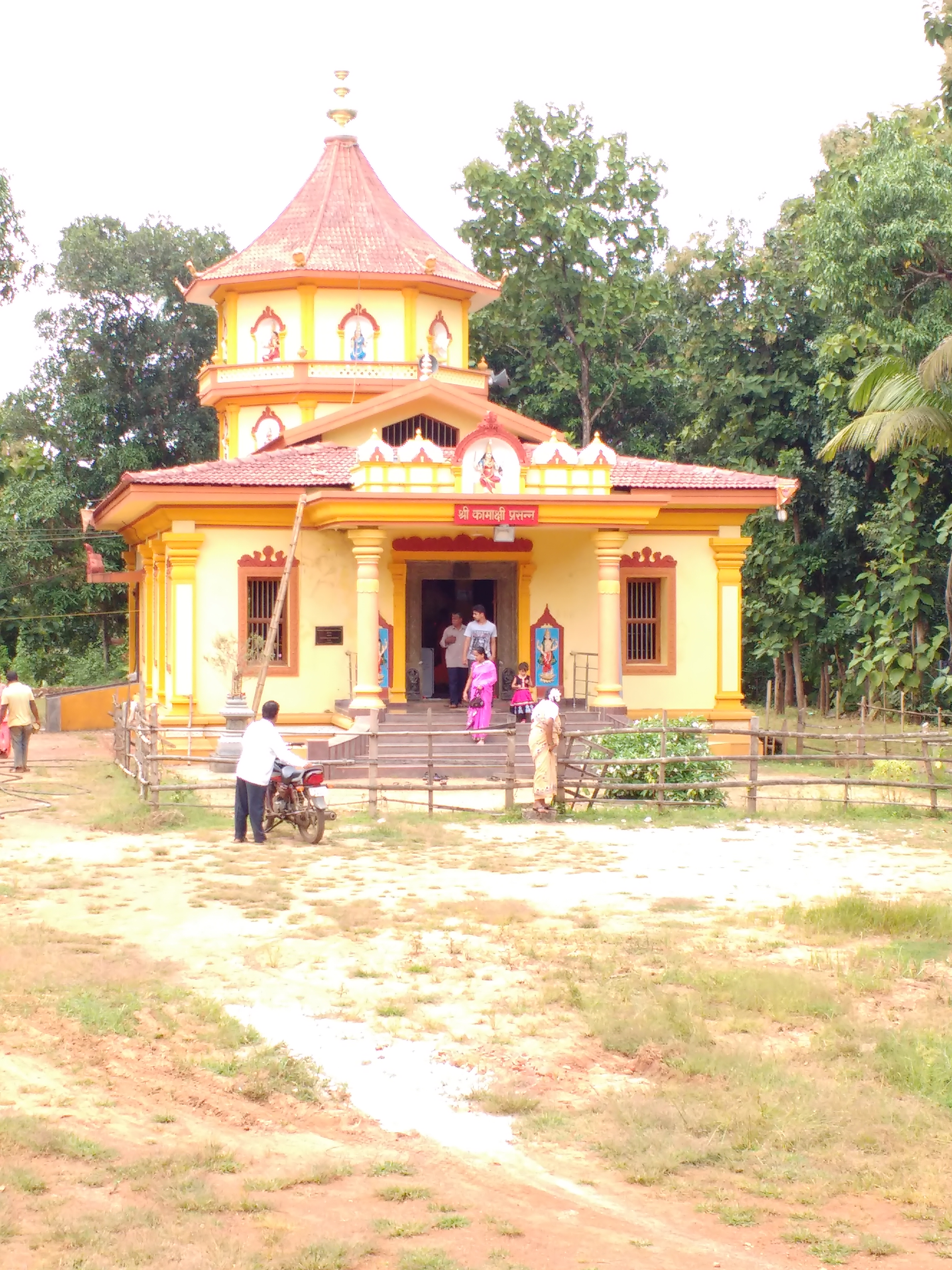
Kamakshi Temple, Asnoti.

== See also ==
- Sadashivgad
- Kali river
- Karwar
- List of railway stations in India

Next 'Small' station towards Mumbai: Canacona	Konkan Railway : Railway (India)	Next 'Small' station from Mumbai: Harwada
Next 'Small' station towards Mumbai: Canacona	Distance from Mumbai(CST) = 0805 km	Next 'Small' station from Mumbai: Harwada
Next 'Main' station towards Mumbai: Madgaon	Konkan Railway : Railway (India)	Next 'Main' station from Mumbai: Karwar
