= Damodar (Krishna) =

Epithet of Hindu god Krishna

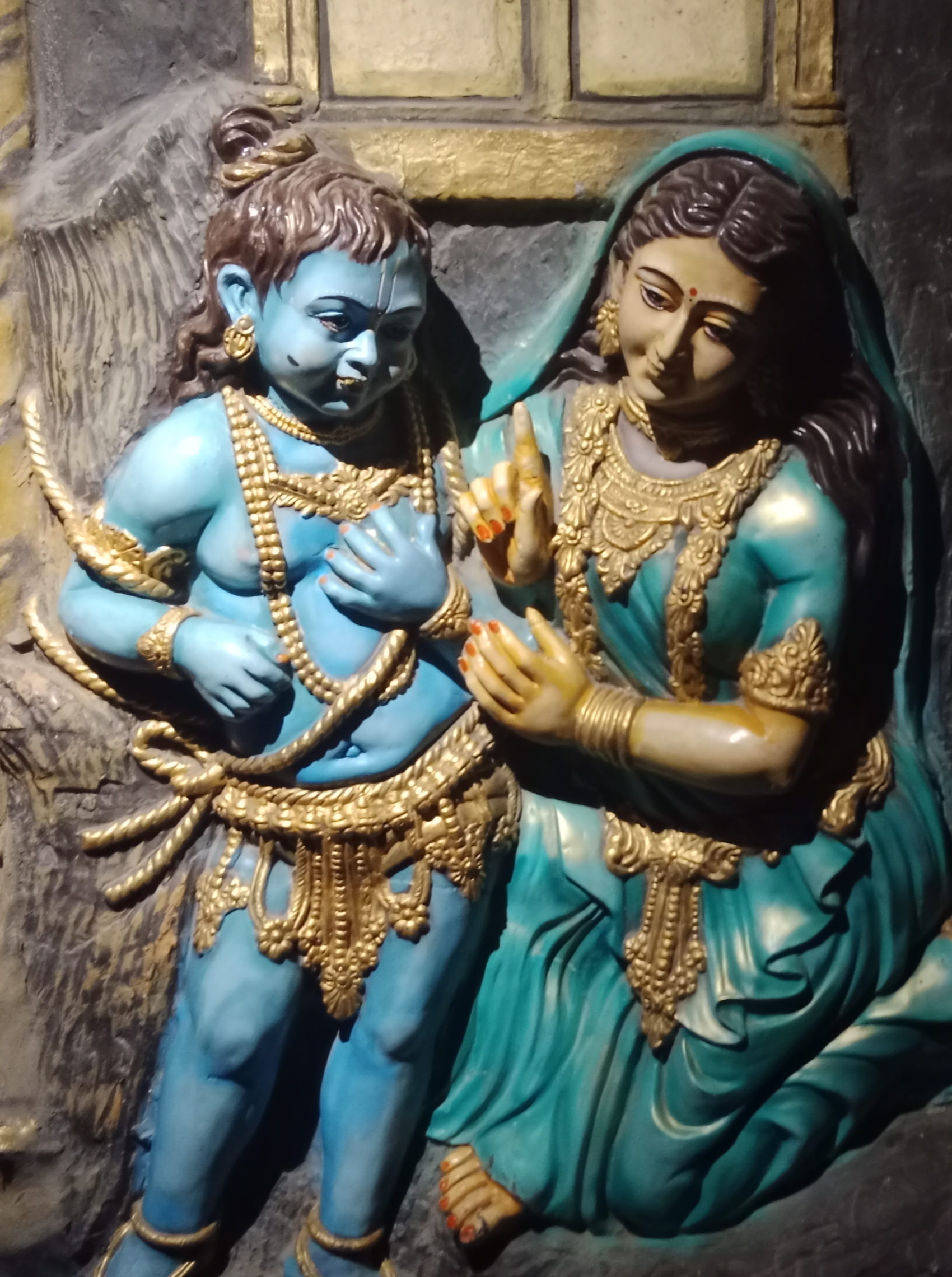
Krishna in his form of Damodar with mother Yashoda at Shri Priyakant ju Temple, Vrindavan

Damodar (Sanskrit: दामोदर, IAST: Dāmodara, also spelled "Damodara" and "Damodarah") lit. '"roped around the abdomen"' is the 367th name of Vishnu from the Vishnu Sahasranama. The various meanings of the name are given as follows:

- "The Lord when He was tied with a cord (dāma) around His waist (udara)", denoting a divine pastime in which Krishna's mother Yashoda bound him for being mischievous. (Used by various Vaishnava adherents.)
- "One who is known through a mind which is purified (Udara) by means of self-control (dama)".
- "One in whose bosom rests the entire universe."

== Temples ==
In many temples, Krishna is worshiped as Damodar. Historic temples and sites related to Damodar includes:

- Radha Damodar Temple, Vrindavan
- Radha Damodar Temple, Junagadh
- Damodar Kund, Junagadh

== In popular culture ==
A popular prayer or hymn that praises Lord Krishna as Damodara is the Damodarashtakam (found in the Padma Purana of Krishna Dwaipayana Vyasa, spoken by Satyavrata Muni in a conversation with Narada and Shaunaka.). It is often sung by devotees during the month of Kartika, and is very popular amongst the Vaishnavas of ISKCON as well as Gaudiya Vaishnavas out of ISKCON.

== See also ==
- Achyuta
- Gopala
- Gopinath
- Govinda
- Keshava
- Madhava
- Radha Ramana
- Vāsudeva
