= Sanvordem =

Sanvordem Sanvodd'ddem
- census town
- Location in Goa, India Sanvordem (India)
- Coordinates: 15.27°N 74.12°E
- Country: India
- State: Goa
- District: Kushavati district
- Elevation: 18 m (59 ft)

Population (2001)
  - Total: 4,832

Languages
  - Official: Konkani
- Time zone: UTC+5:30 (IST)
- Vehicle registration: GA
- Website: goa.gov.in

Sanvordem (Sanvodd'ddem, pronounced, [sãːw(ɔ)ɖɖɛ̃ː]) is a census town in Kushavati district in the Indian state of Goa. It is a twin town with Curchorem and is about 14 km from Shiroda via Panchawadi. Sunday is the major market day and people from the nearby areas flock to buy necessities. A few years back it was considered a more remote place in Goa but today it is a fast developing town. It is a one-and-a-half-hour drive from the Goan capital Panaji.

== Geography ==
Sanvordem is located at Sanguem taluka. It has an average elevation of 18 metres (59 feet).

== Demographics ==
As of 2001 India census, Sanvordem had a population of 4,832. Males constitute 50% of the population and females 50%. Sanvordem has an average literacy rate of 72%, higher than the national average of 59.5%: male literacy is 78%, and female literacy is 67%. In Sanvordem, 12% of the population is under 6 years of age.

== Government and politics ==
Sanvordem is part of Sanvordem (Goa Assembly constituency) and South Goa (Lok Sabha constituency).

== Economy ==
Mining is one of the major economic activities of Sanvordem. A lot of trucks carrying the ore from one place to another are a regular sight on local roads. It is more known for a wholesale market value.
