= Chaudi =

- town
- Location in Goa, India Chaudi (India)
- Coordinates: 15.007°N 74.047°E
- Country: India
- State: Goa
- District: Kushavati district

Government
  - Body: Municipality

Languages
  - Official: Konkani
- Time zone: UTC+5:30 (IST)
- Postal code: 403702
- Vehicle registration: GA
- Website: goa.gov.in

Chaudi is a town in the Kushavati district of the state of Goa, India. It is located approximately two kilometres from the city of Canacona.

== History ==
The town used to be a place of public business and housed a village hall, as each comunidade had its own hall called chavdi or chaudi where village elders would make important decisions. In Canacona, Chaudi has maintained its prominence as the principal town of the taluka.
