= Canacona =

Canacona Kāṇkŏṇ
- city
- Location in Goa, India Canacona (India)
- Coordinates: 15.02°N 74.02°E
- Country: India
- State: Goa
- District: Kushavati district

Government
  - MLA: Ramesh Tawadkar
  - Chairperson: Ramakant Naik Gaunkar
- Elevation: 10 m (33 ft)

Population (2011)
  - Total: 12,434

Languages
  - Official: Konkani
- Time zone: UTC+5:30 (IST)
- Vehicle registration: GA 10
- Website: goa.gov.in

Canacona, historically known as Kanvapura, is a city and a municipal council in the district of Kushavati, Goa state, India. The Canacona taluka includes Patnem, Chaudi, Poinguinim, Loliem-Polem, Agonda, and Gaumdongre. Chaudi is the headquarters of its taluka. Palolem Beach is located in Canacona.

== Geography ==
Canacona is located at 15.02°N 74.02°E. It has an average elevation of 10 metres (32 feet). Canacona is the southernmost taluka of Goa.

== Education ==
Dnyna Prabodhini Mandal's Shree Mallikarjun College of Arts & Commerce is located in Delem, Canacona. It is affiliated with Goa University. There are two higher secondary schools in Canacona.

One of the two JNV institutions in Goa; Jawahar Navodaya Vidyalaya, Canacona is also situated in Delem, Canacona.

The taluka also includes Centro Promotor De Instrucao primary school, which later expanded to include Shri Mallikarjun High School and Shri Mallikarjun Higher Secondary.

== Demographics ==
As of 2011 India census, Canacona city had a population of 12,434. Males constitute 52% of the population and females 48%. Canacona has an average literacy rate of 89.31%, higher than the national average of 74.04%; with male literacy of 93.09% and female literacy of 85.47%. 10% of the population is under 6 years of age. In addition to Konkani, Marathi is also spoken here by a minority.

== Government and politics ==
Canacona is part of Canacona (Goa Assembly constituency) and South Goa (Lok Sabha constituency).

Canacona (CNO)
Next 'Small' station towards Mumbai: Balli	Konkan Railway : Railway (India)	Next 'Small' station from Mumbai: Loliem
Next 'Small' station towards Mumbai: Balli	Distance from Mumbai(CST) = 0780 km	Next 'Small' station from Mumbai: Loliem
Next 'Main' station towards Mumbai: Margao	Konkan Railway : Railway (India)	Next 'Main' station from Mumbai: Karwar
