= Quepem =

Quepem Goan Konkani: Kepem Portuguese: Quepém
- Town
- Location in Goa, India Quepem (India)
- Coordinates: 15.22°N 74.07°E
- Country: India
- State: Goa
- District: Kushavati district
- Taluka: Quepem taluka
- Established: AD 1787
- Founder: Deão Jose Paulo de Almeida
- Elevation: 21 m (69 ft)

Population (2011)
  - Total: 14 795

Languages
  - Official: Konkani
- Time zone: UTC+5:30 (IST)
- PIN: 403 705
- Vehicle registration: GA-09
- Website: goa.gov.in

Quepem is a town and the capital of kushavati district in the Indian state of Goa. The town is the administrative headquarters of the Quepem taluka (sub-district).

== History ==
The town was established by a Portuguese nobleman Deão Jose Paulo de Almeida, the dean (Deão) of the church in AD 1787 after he moved there just five years after the conquest of Quepem sub-district by the Portuguese. He built his famous Palácio do Deão, followed by a public market, hospital, a church and other facilities for the benefit of the inhabitants through his own expense. He was later awarded the unofficial title of Barão de Quepem by then viceroy D. Manuel Francisco Zacarias de Portugal e Castro.

Quepem city before AD 1787 was a scattered settlement surrounded by thick jungle. It was situated in the princely state ruled by the Soondas. When Hyder Ali began raiding and annexing the state, the princely family turned to the Portuguese who immediately took on Hyder Ali's forces and repelled them, as well as financed the administration of the state. Having no heir to succeed, the then ruler gave complete control of the provinces to the Portuguese for their generosity in 1783.

In AD 1787, Deaõ. Jose Paulo de Almeida transferred his residence from Old Goa to Quepem and founded a hamlet. Quepem was, in those days, covered with forest. He ordered the planting of rice, coconut palms and other fruit trees.

He established a public market, hospital and other facilities for the benefit of the inhabitants.

He also founded the Santa Cruz church, at his own cost, as inscribed on the pyramidal structure in the churchyard.

It is believed that the Deão began by erecting two columns at the entrance of Quepem. Thereafter, he obtained permission that criminal offenders who entered this village across these columns to work could rehabilitate themselves in this village which he had founded. Thus, he was able to establish Quepem as an arable, self-sustaining and habitable place.

It is not known the origin of this story, but one is able to still see the bases of these columns at the entrance of Quepem.

He constructed in Quepem, for his occasional stay, a spacious house that he modestly described as a ‘Farm House’. It was later, justifiably, come to be known as the Palácio Do Deão.

== Geography ==
Quepem has an average elevation of 21 metres (69 feet). It is located on the bank of River Kushawati. Curchorem and Sanvordem are the major towns located near the Quepem town.

== Demographics ==
Religion in Quepem (2011)
1. Christianity (48.2%)
2. Hinduism (41.6%)
3. Islam (9.82%)
4. Others (0.41%)

As of the 2011 Census of India, 14 795 individuals inhabited Quepem—7 277 males, and 7 518 females. The total number of households were 3 613. The sex ratio was 1 033 females per 1 000 males compared to the state average of 973 females per 1 000 males. Population of children within the age‑group of 0–6 was 1 513, who made up 10.23 per cent of the total population. Moreover, the child sex ratio was 1 001 compared to the state average of 942.

According to the census report, Quepem has an average literacy rate of 83.56%—male literacy is 87.36%, and female literacy is 79.88%—lower than the state average of 88.70%.

== Culture ==
The city is known for the annual Ganeshotsav Festival, Carnival, Shigmostav celebrated with pomp and gaiety. The centre of such celebrations is the Municipal Garden, at the center of the town. The village feast of Holy Cross is also celebrated with great zeal in May and October.

== Government and politics ==
Quepem is part of Quepem (Goa Assembly constituency) and South Goa (Lok Sabha constituency).

== Attractions ==
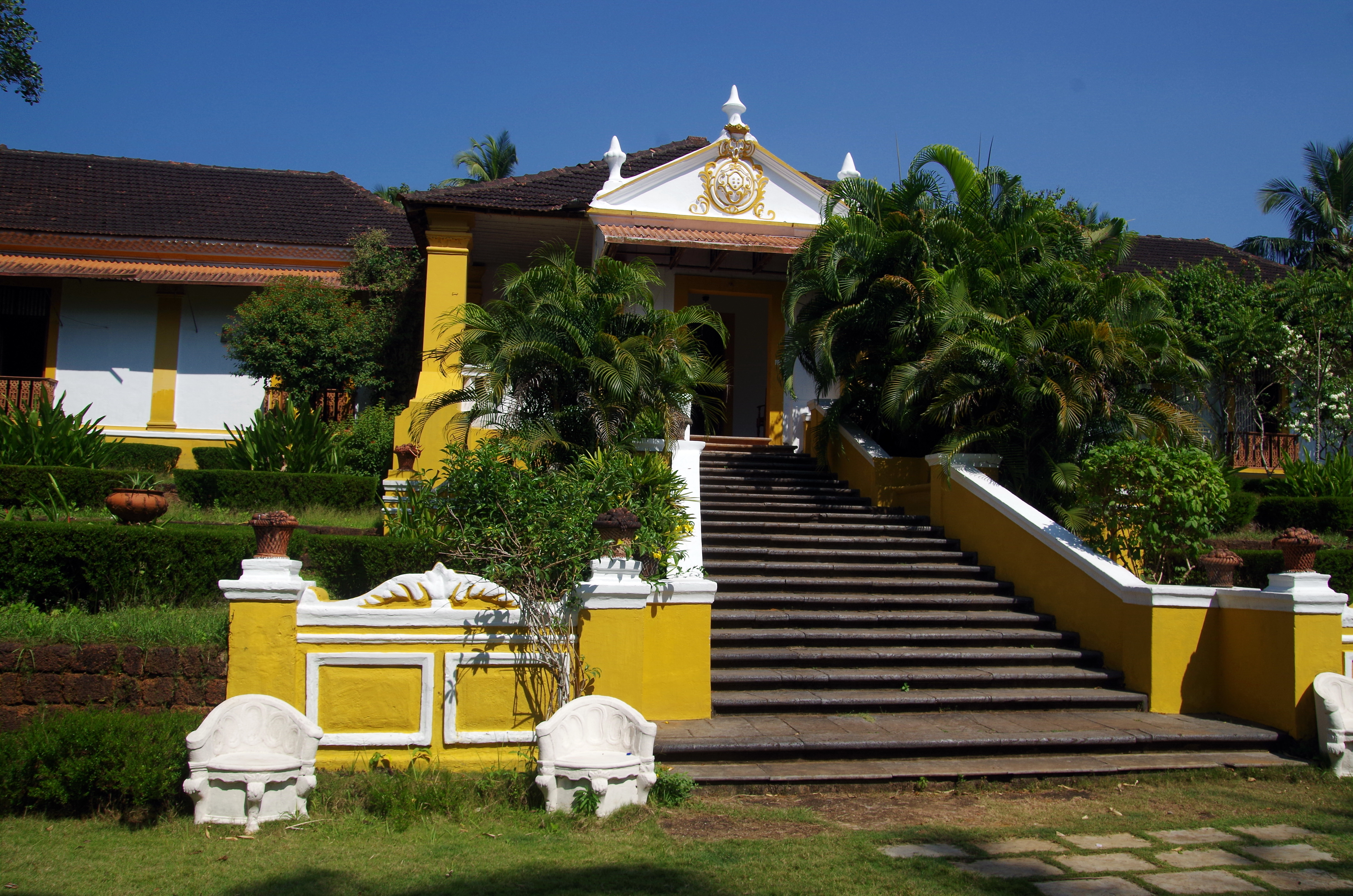
Palácio do Deão, Quepem

The main tourist attraction in the area are the Holy Cross church, the Old Dam (Baand), the Holy Cross hillock (valé-tembi), and the Palácio Do Deão. Quepem is also known for its scenery.

== Educational institutes ==
- Don Bosco – Pope John XXIII High School & Higher Secondary
- Holy Cross High School.

== Notable people ==
- Lawry Travasso
- Chandrakant Babu Kavlekar
