= Sanguem =

- city
- Location in Goa, India Sanguem (India)
- Coordinates: 15.23°N 74.17°E
- Country: India
- State: Goa
- District: Kushavati district

Government
  - Body: Municipality
- Elevation: 22 m (72 ft)

Population (2001)
  - Total: 6,158

Languages
  - Official: Konkani
- Time zone: UTC+5:30 (IST)
- Postal code: 403704
- Vehicle registration: GA 09
- Website: goa.gov.in

Sanguem is a city and a municipal council in Kushavati district in the Indian state of Goa. Notable landmarks include the Sagameshwar Temple, Bhagwan Mahaveer Sanctuary and Mollem National Park and the Salaulim Dam.

== Geography ==
Sanguem is located at 15.23°N 74.17°E. It has an average elevation of 22 metres (72 feet).

== Demographics ==
As of 2011 India census, Sanguem had a population of 6,444 inhabitants, of which 3,162 were males and 3,282 females with female sex ratio of 1,038 against state average of 973. Sanguem has a literacy rate of 88.39%, compared to the state average of 88.70%: male literacy is 92.41%, and female literacy 84.49%. In Sanguem, 10.30% or 664 of the population is under 6 years of age. Konkani is the primary language spoken here.

== Government and politics ==
Sanguem is part of Sanguem (Goa Assembly constituency) and South Goa (Lok Sabha constituency).
