= Kushavati district =

District in Goa, India

- District of Goa
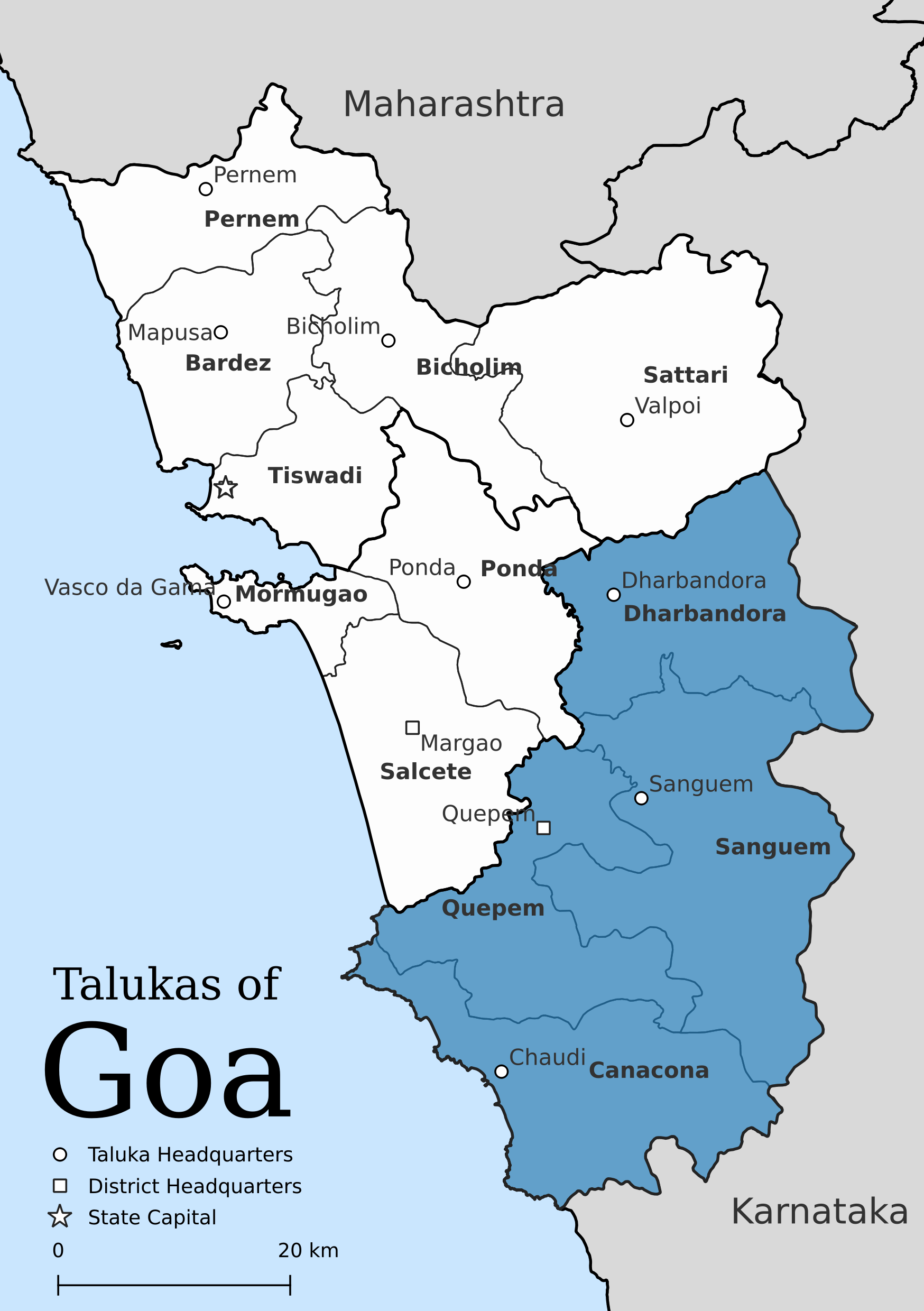
- Kushavati district in Goa state
- Country: India
- State: Goa
- Established: 31 December 2025
- Headquarters: Quepem
- Talukas: 1. Quepem; 2. Sanguem; 3. Dharbandora; 4. Canacona
- Time zone: UTC+05:30 (IST)
- Vehicle registration: GA

Kushavati district is an administrative district in the Indian state of Goa. It was split from South Goa district on 31 December 2025 to become Goa's third district, with its headquarters to be located at Quepem.

The district is named after the Kushavati River, an ancient river with historical and cultural significance in southern Goa.

== History ==
The proposal to create a third district in Goa had been under consideration for several years prior to its formal notification, as part of efforts to decentralise administration and improve governance in the southern and interior regions of the state. In 2023, the Government of Goa constituted committees to study the feasibility, boundaries and administrative implications of carving out a new district from South Goa.

Kushavati district was officially notified on 31 December 2025, with Quepem designated as its administrative headquarters. Until full administrative infrastructure is established, interim arrangements remain under the South Goa district administration.

== Administration ==
The district comprises four talukas—Quepem, Sanguem, Dharbandora and Canacona—which were previously part of South Goa district.

== Demographics ==
As Kushavati district was formed after the 2011 Census of India, official district-level demographic statistics are yet to be published. Demographic characteristics are therefore derived from census data of the constituent talukas. The district has about 27% tribal population.

=== Religion ===
According to derived data from the 2011 Census of India, Hinduism is the majority religion in Kushavati district, accounting for approximately 73% of the population. Christianity constitutes about 21%, while Islam accounts for 5%. Other religions together form about 0.4% of the population.

Religion in Kushavati district
Religion	Percent
Hinduism	72.84%
Christianity	21.37%
Others	5.79%

Taluka	Hindu	Christian	Others
Quepem	51,783	23,908	5,502
Sanguem	51,372	9,027	4,748
Canacona	36,349	7,994	829

=== Language ===
Konkani is the predominant and official language spoken across Kushavati district.

Marathi, Hindi, Kannada and English are also spoken by sections of the population, reflecting the linguistic diversity of the region.

== See also ==
- Districts of Goa
- South Goa district
- North Goa district
