= Tourism in Goa =

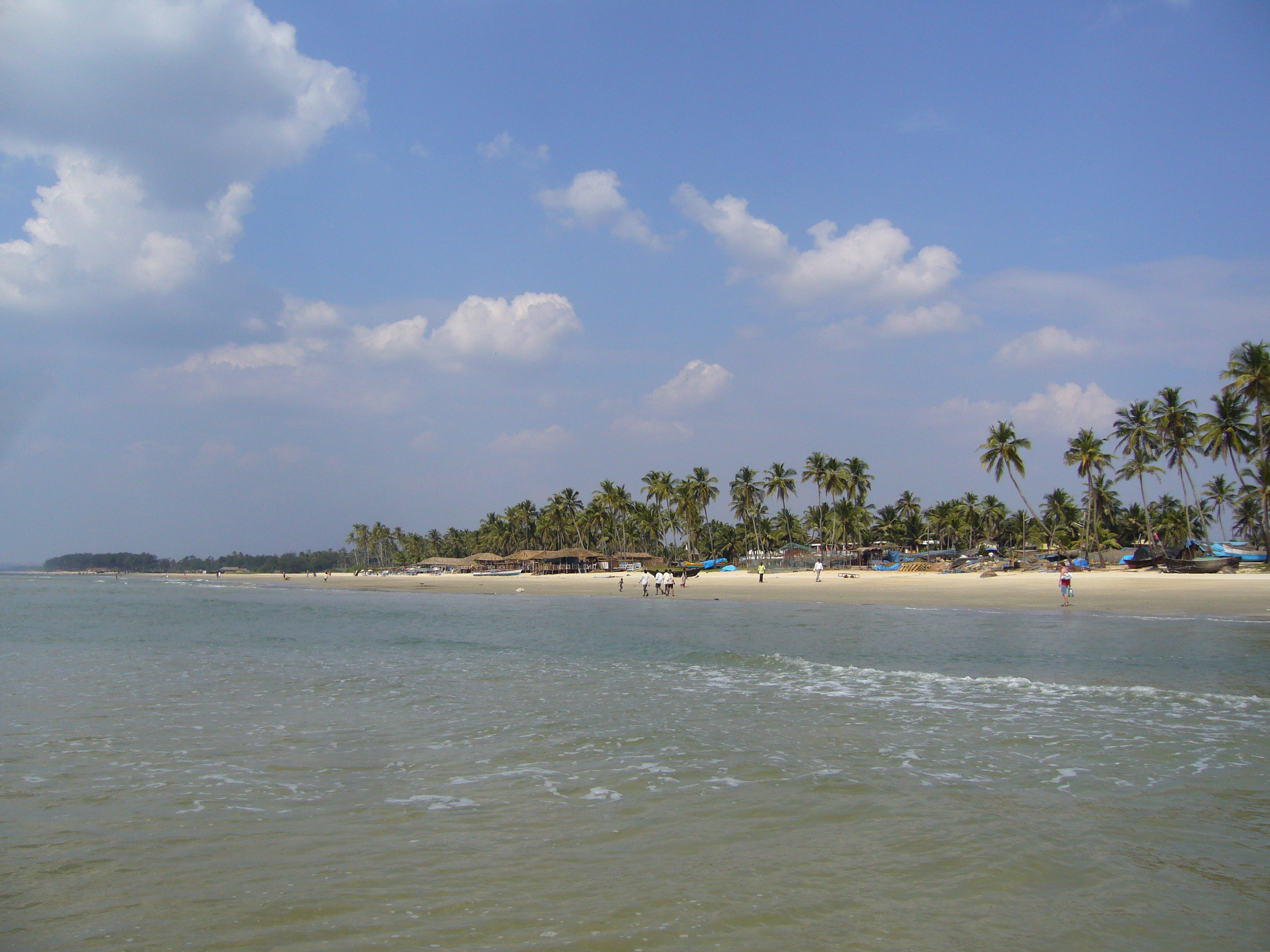
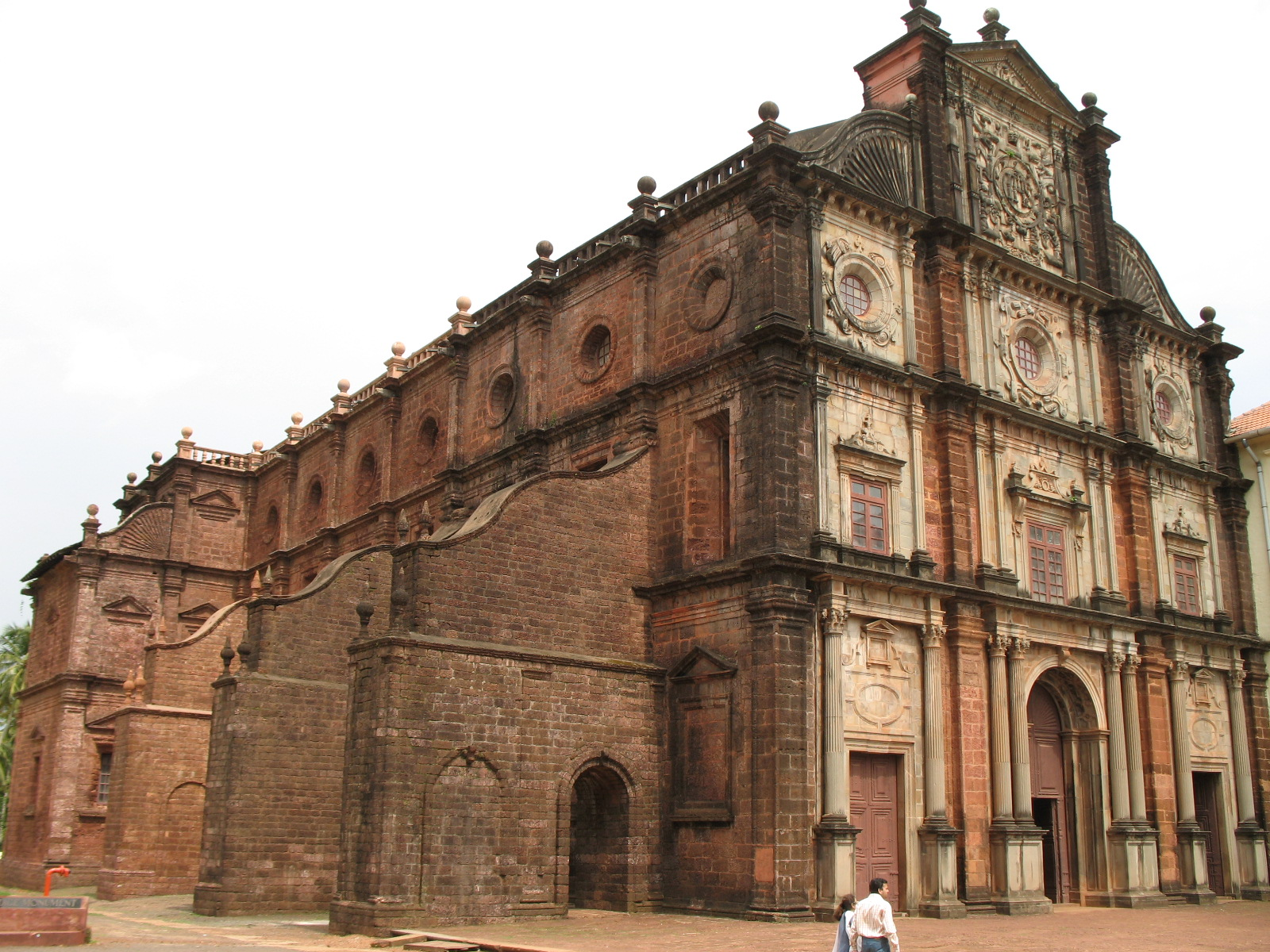
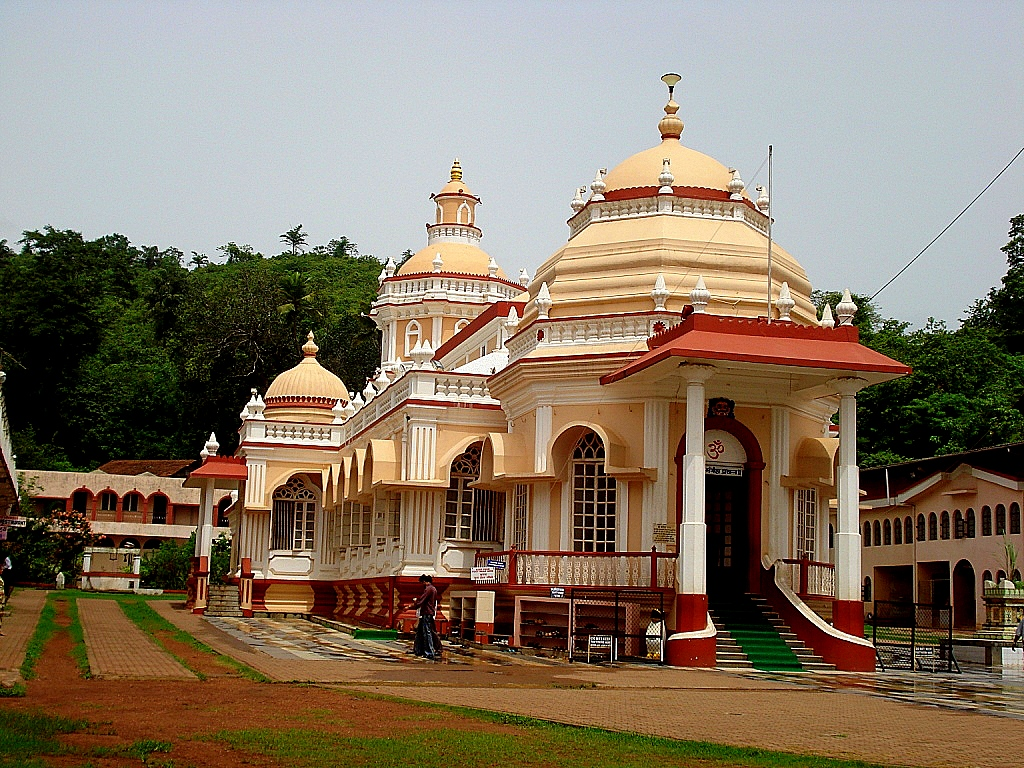
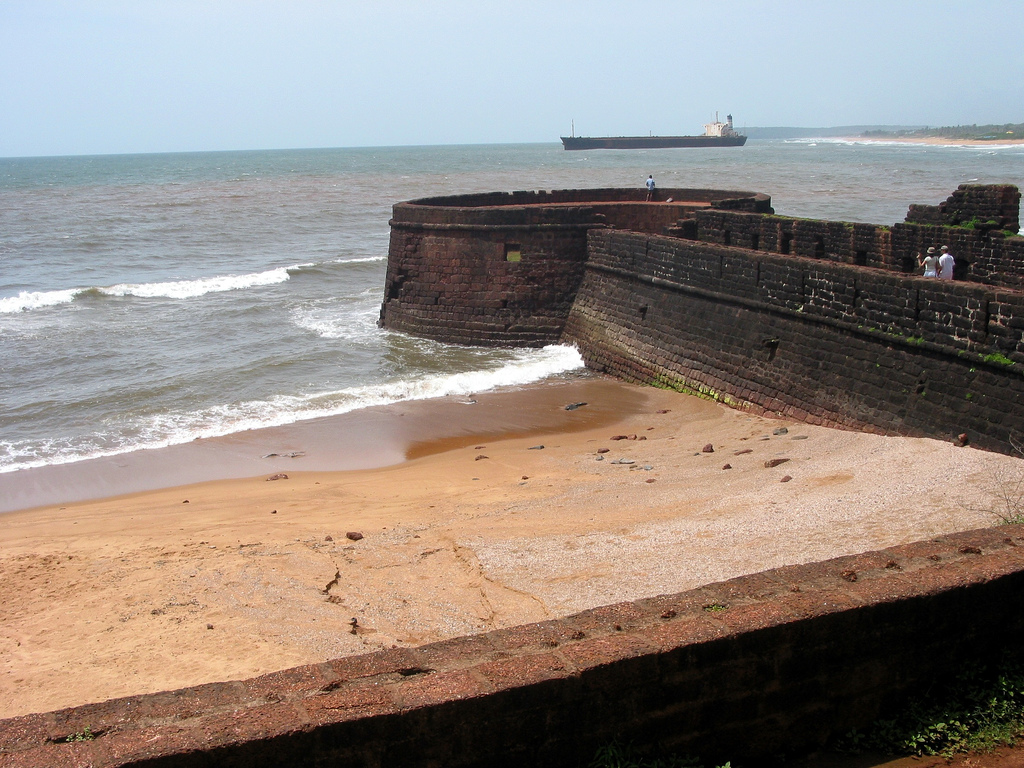
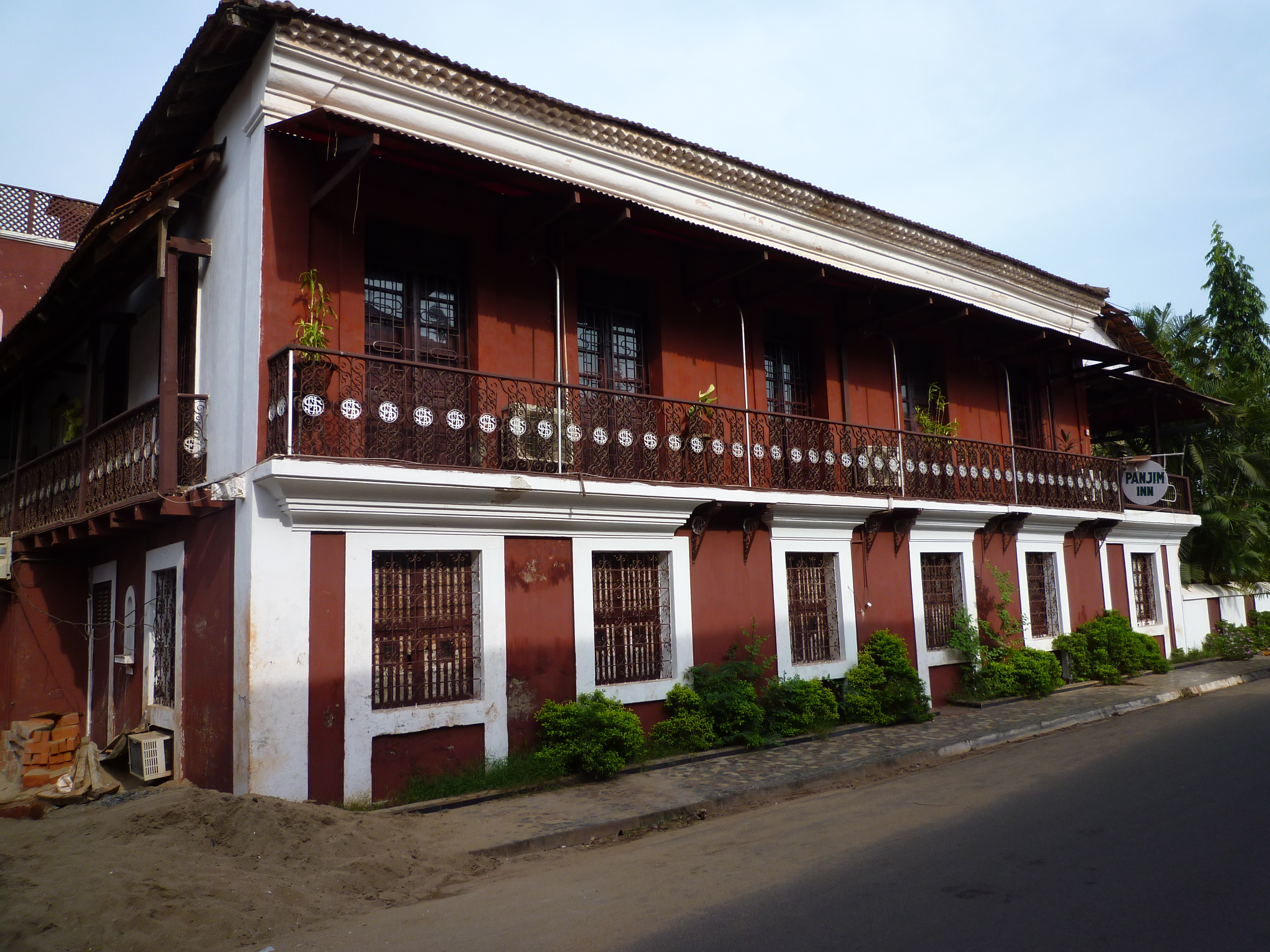
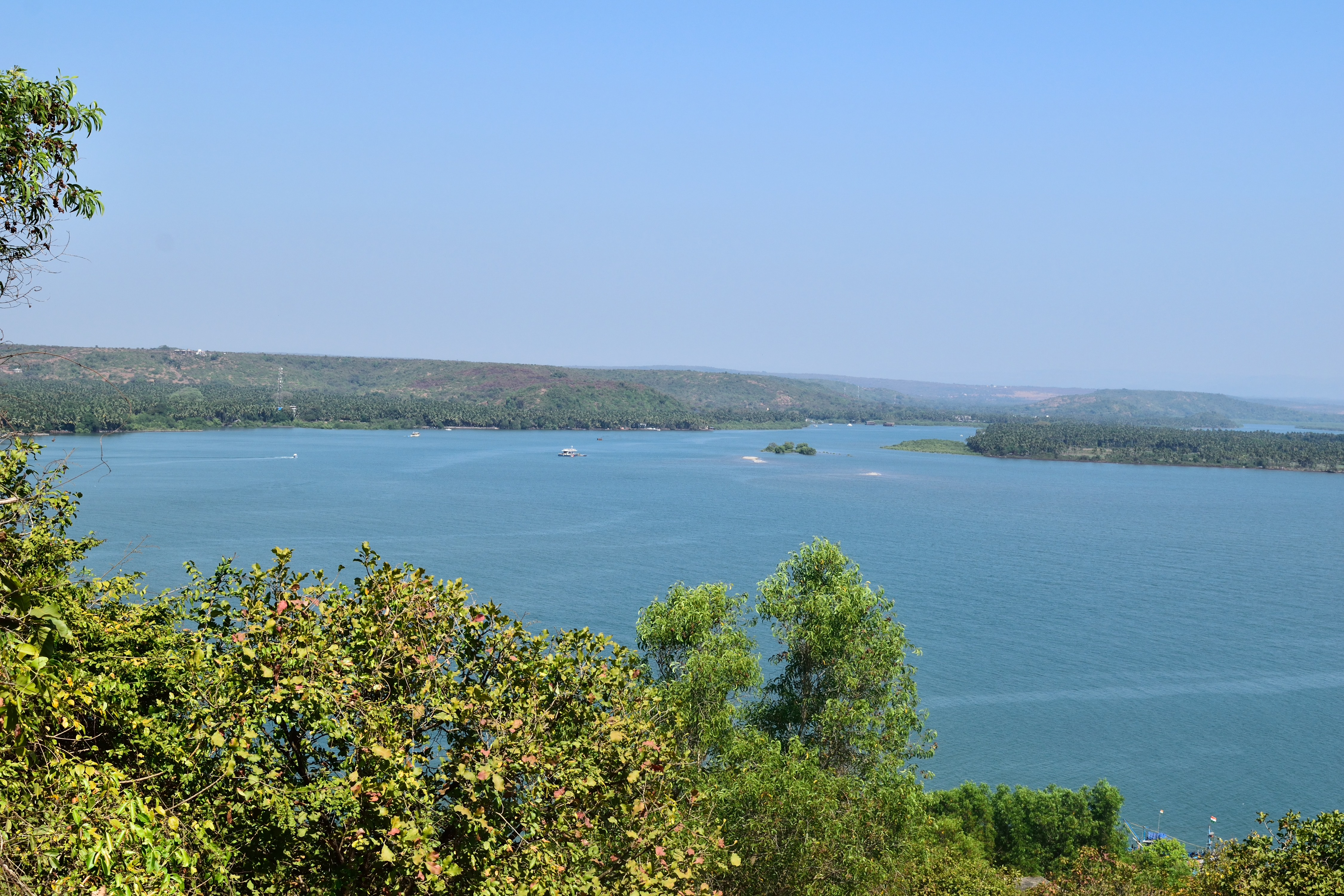
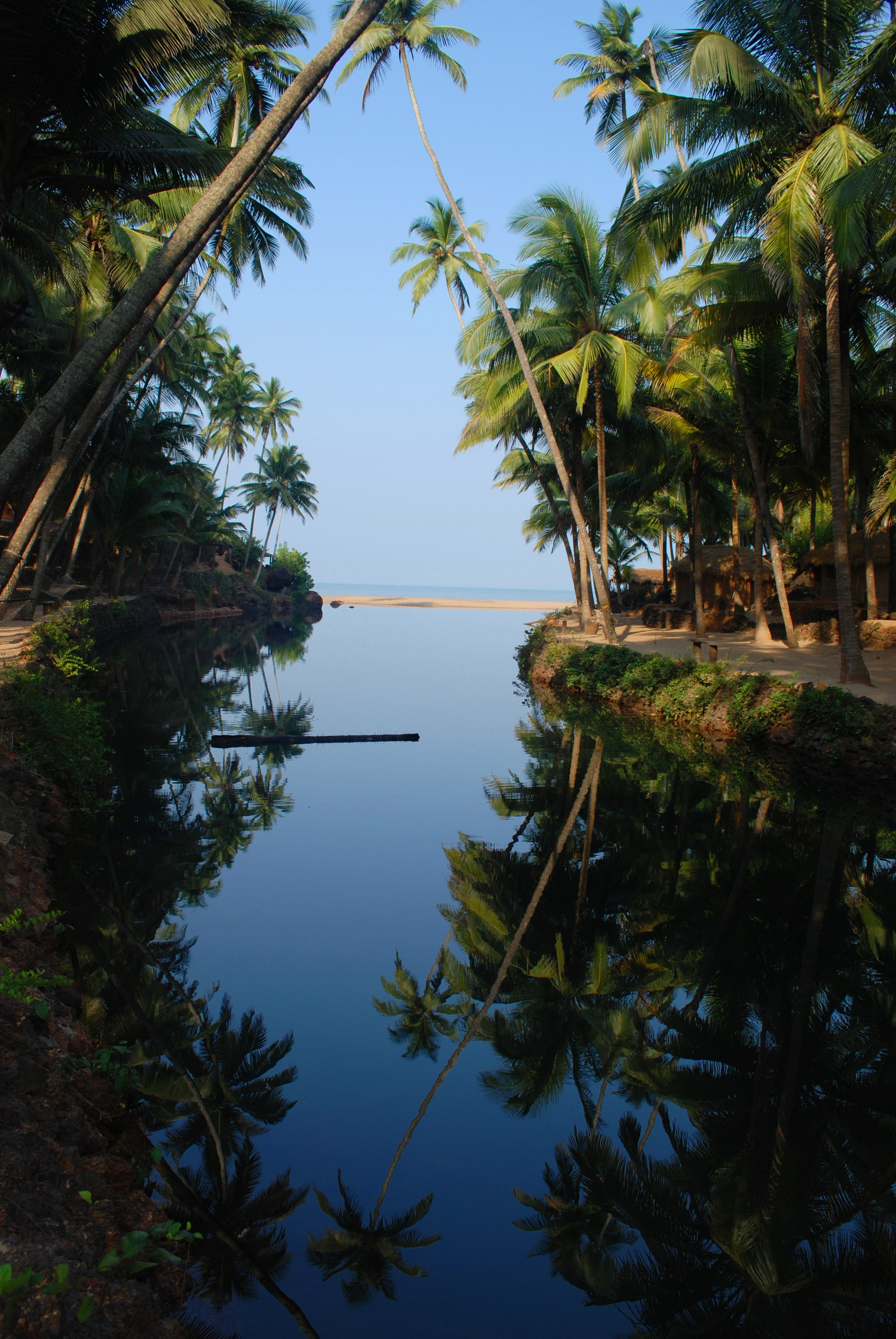
From Top left to right: Goan beach, Basilica of Bom Jesus, Mangueshi Temple, Fort Aguada, A Portuguese house in Fontainhas, Chapora River Corjuem Fort, Backwaters of Goa

The state of Goa, in India, is famous for its beaches and places of worship. Tourism is its primary industry, and is generally focused on the coastal areas of Goa, with decreased tourist activity inland.

Foreign tourists, mostly from Europe, arrive in Goa in winter, whilst the summer and monsoon seasons see many Indian tourists. Goa handled 2.29% of all foreign tourist arrivals in the country in 2011. This relatively small state is situated on the west coast of India, between the borders of Maharashtra and Karnataka, and is better known to the world as a former Portuguese enclave on Indian soil. Thus, tourism forms the backbone of Goa's economy.

Major tourist attractions include Bom Jesus Basilica, Fort Aguada, a wax museum on Indian culture, and a heritage museum. The Churches and Convents of Goa have been declared a World Heritage Site by UNESCO.

As of 2013, Goa was the destination of choice for Indian and foreign tourists, particularly Britons, with limited means who wanted to party. The state was hopeful that changes could be made which would attract a more upscale demographic.

On 24 November 2017, Delta Corp Limited claimed to have set up the first casino game training course centre in India at Goa.

Goa also draws tourists from all over India for its bungee activity, water sports and underwater scuba diving experience.

Goa is one of the few territories in India that has allowed on-shore and off-shore casinos and gaming, alongside Sikkim.

== Beaches ==
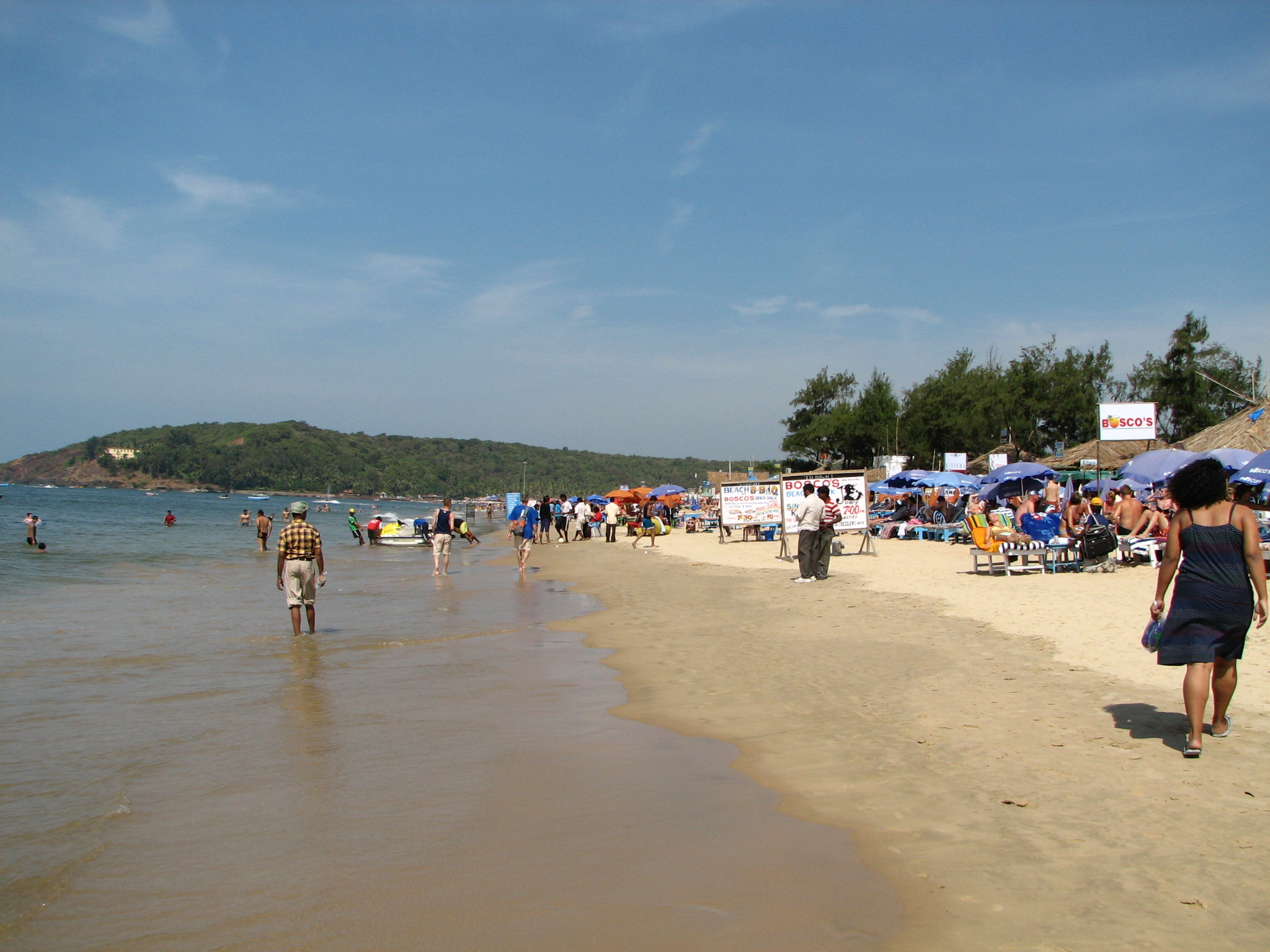
Baga Beach in North Goa

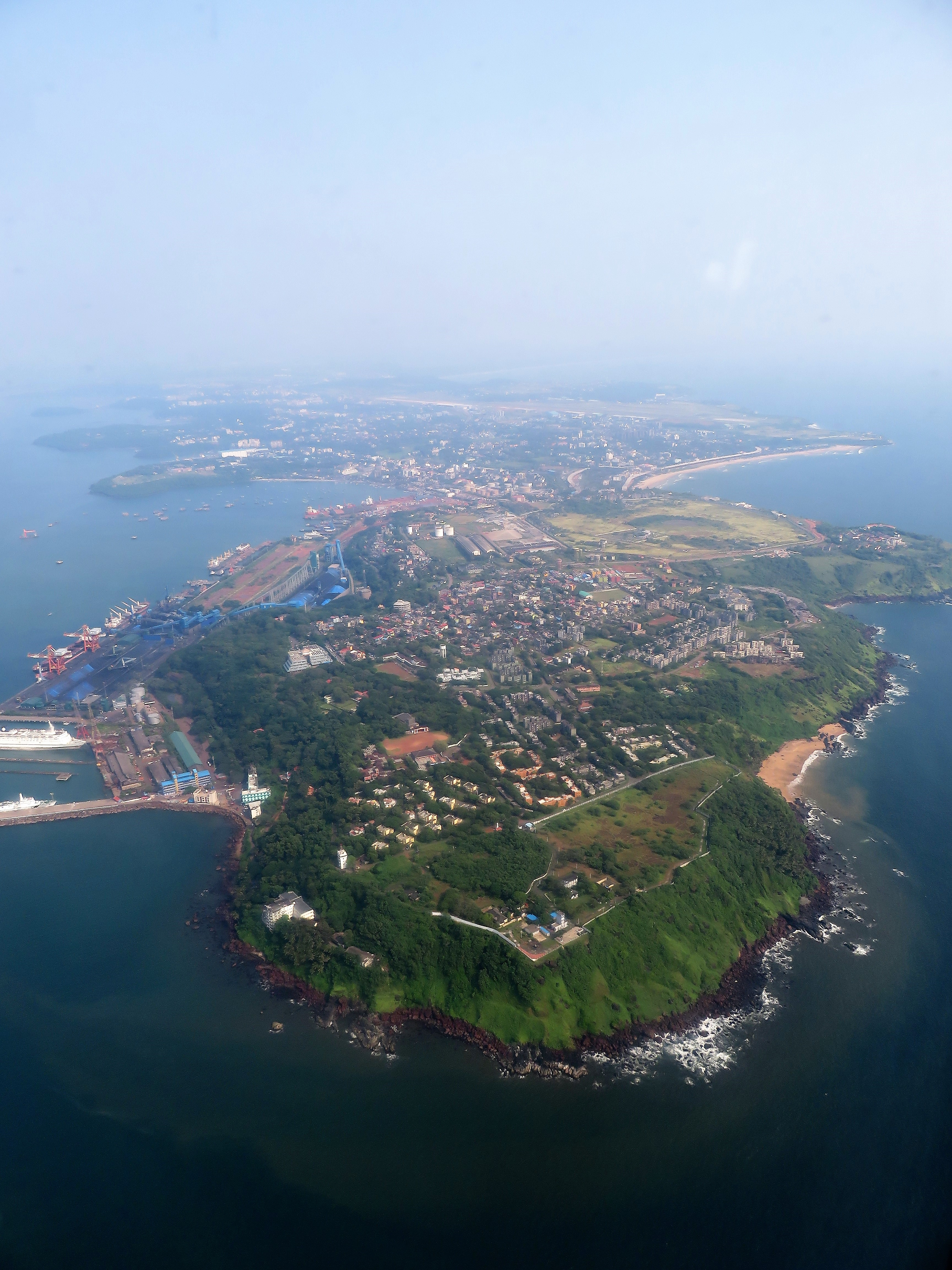
Picture of GOA taken from an air craft's window

Goa's beaches cover about 125 kilometres (78 miles) of its coastline. These beaches are divided into North and South Goa.

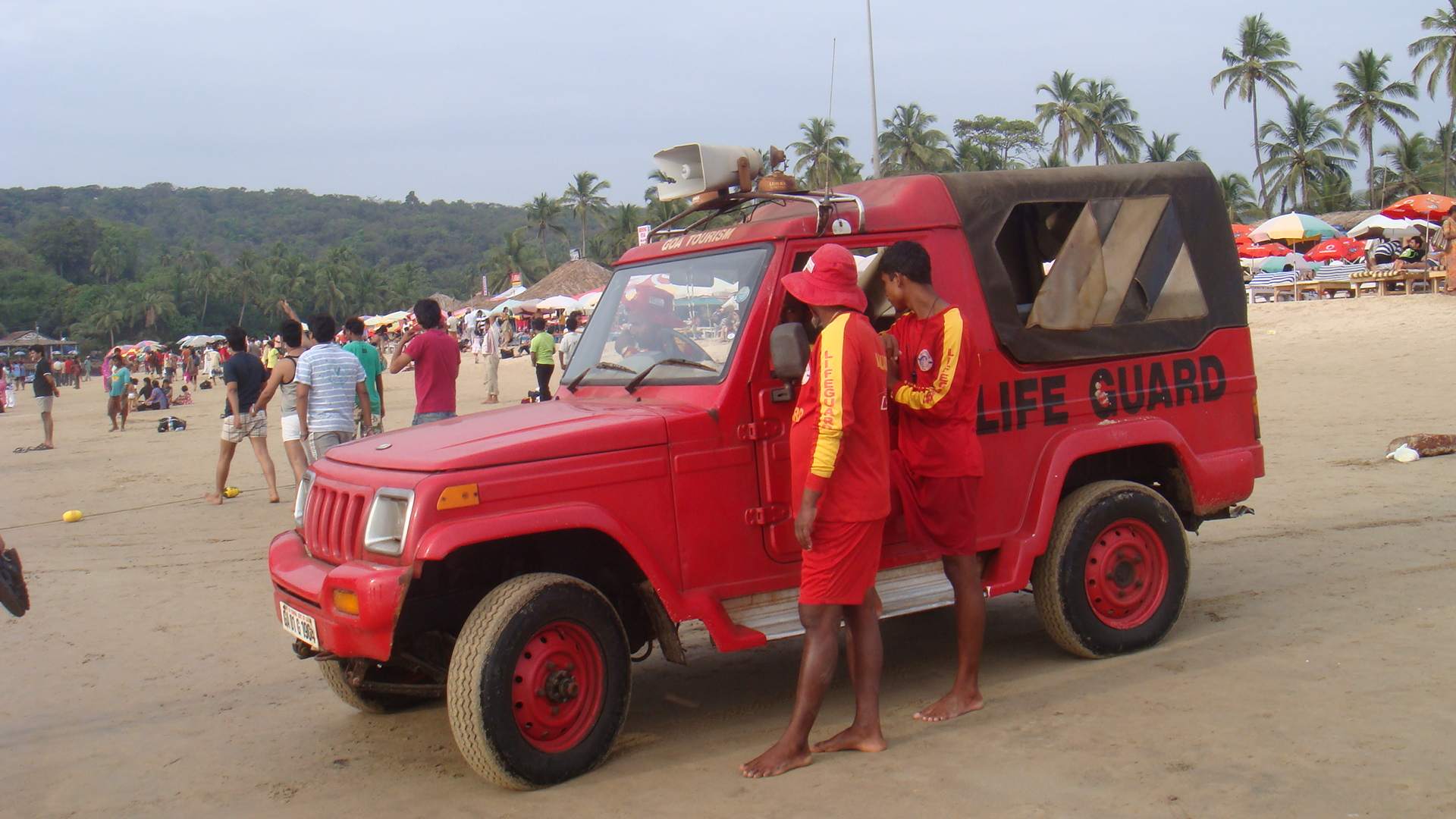
Most Goan beaches are equipped with lifeguards

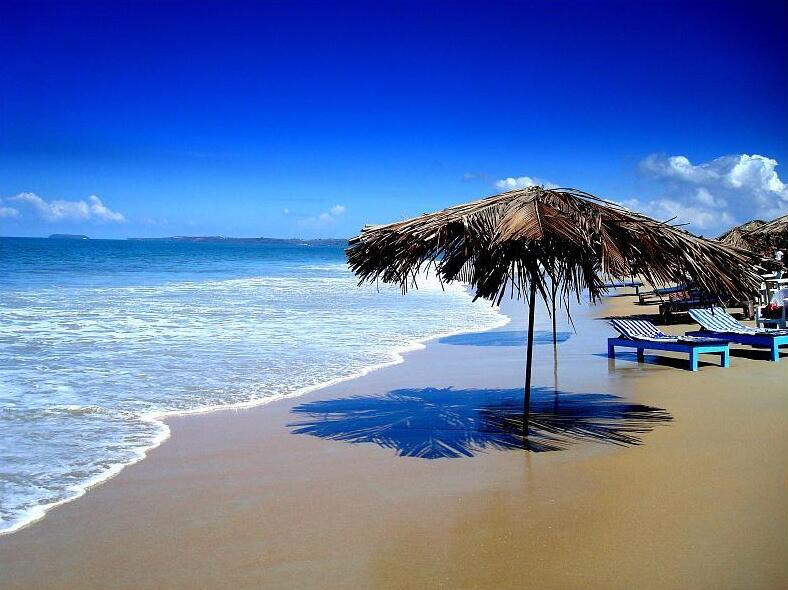
Colva Beach in South Goa

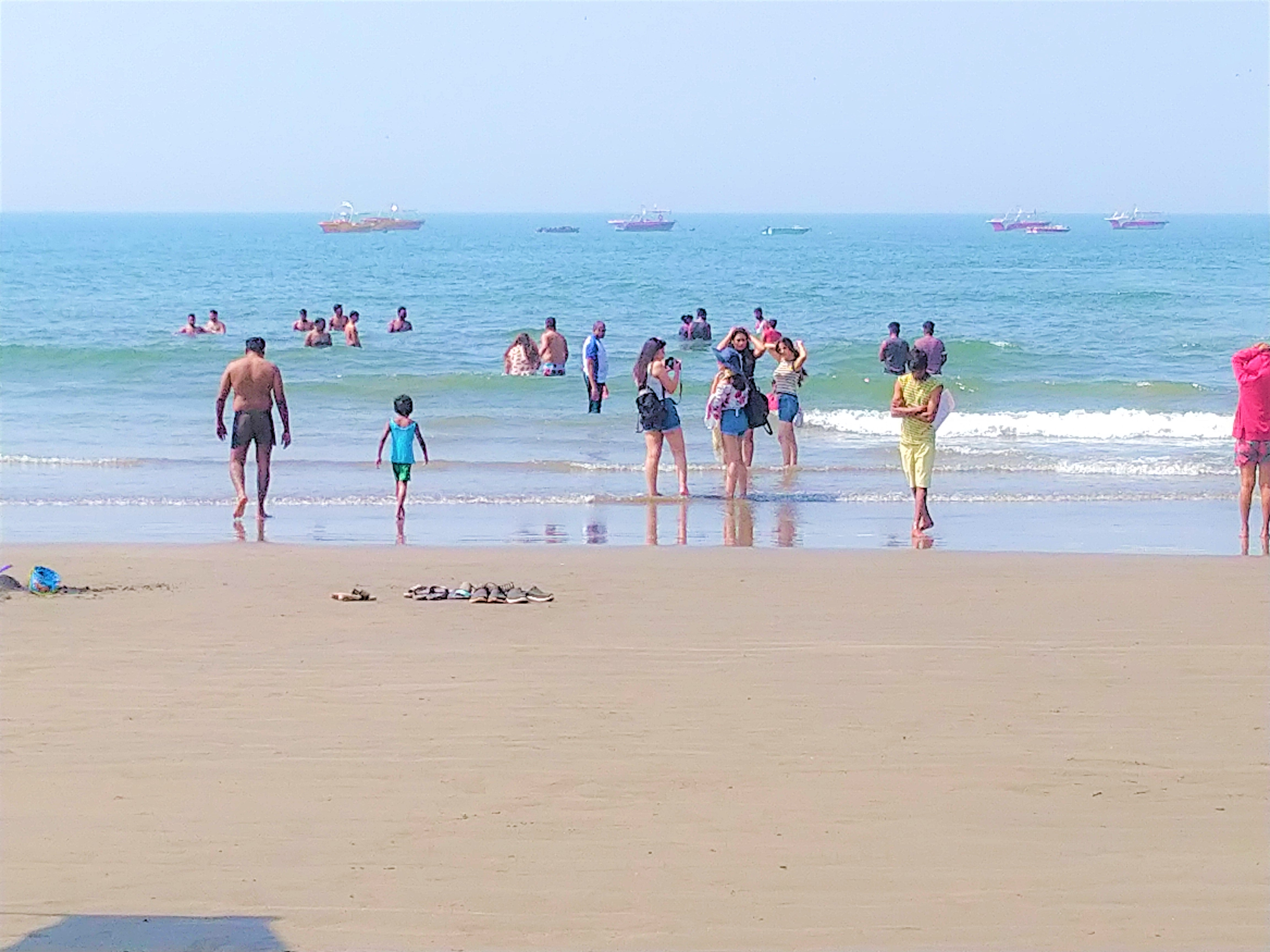
Tourists at Vagator beach in Goa. Ships can be seen in the background.

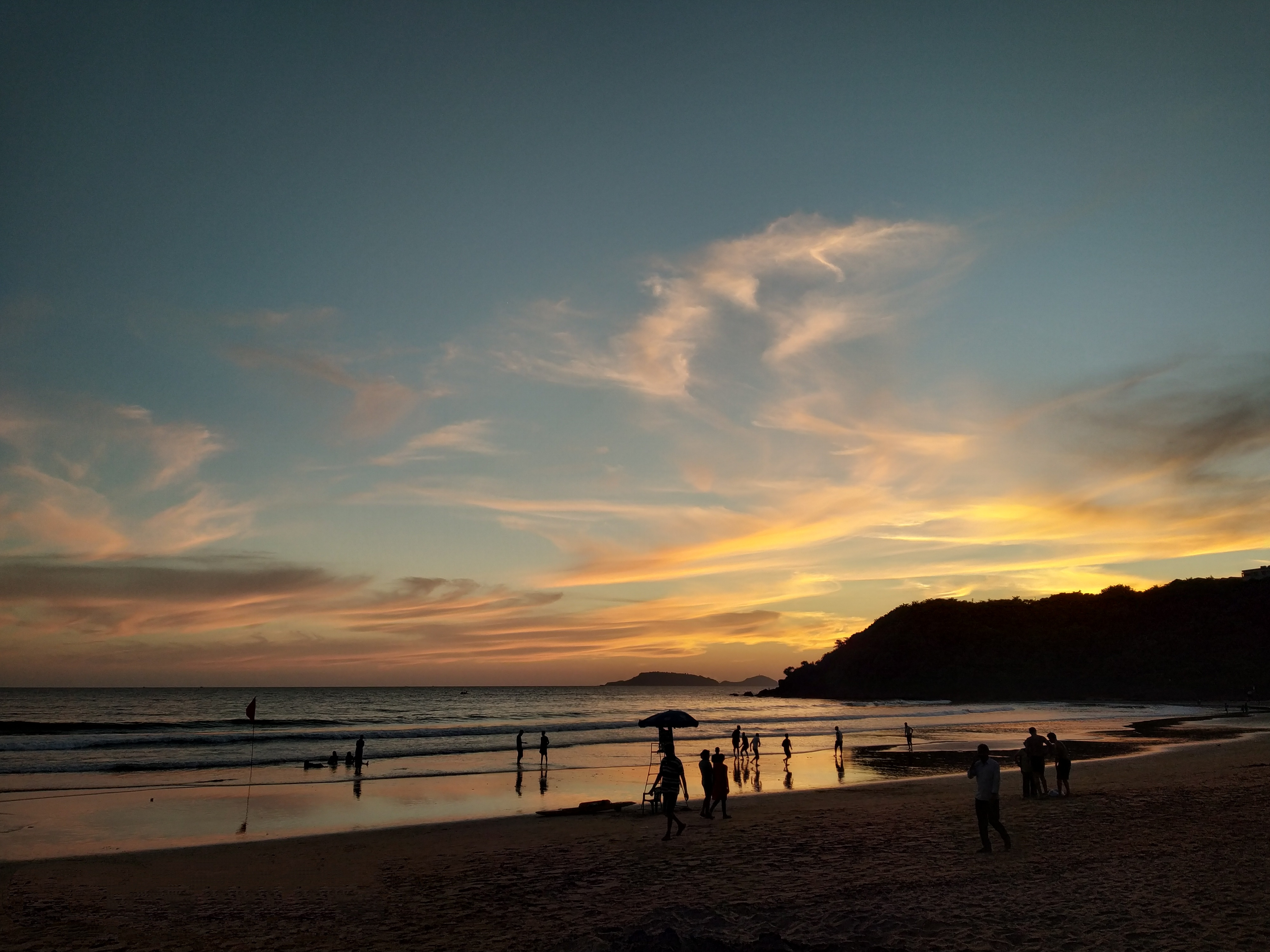
Bogmalo beach in South Goa

=== North Goa Beaches ===
- Pernem
  - Querim Beach,
  - Kalacha Beach,
  - Arambol Beach,
  - Mandrem Beach,
  - Ashvem Beach,
  - Morjim Beach,
- Bardez
  - Chapora Beach,
  - Vagator Beach,
  - Ozran Beach,
  - Anjuna Beach,
  - Baga Beach,
  - Calangute Beach,
  - Candolim Beach,
  - Sinquerim Beach,
  - Coco Beach,
  - Kegdole beach
- Tiswadi
  - Miramar Beach,
  - Caranzalem Beach,
  - Dona Paula Beach,
  - Vaiguinim Beach,
  - Bambolim Beach,
  - Siridao Beach

=== South Goa Beaches ===
- Mormugao
  - Bogmalo Beach,
  - Baina Beach,
  - Hansa Beach,
  - Hollant Beach,
  - Cansaulim Beach,
  - Velsao Beach
- Salcete
  - Arossim Beach,
  - Utorda Beach,
  - Majorda Beach,
  - Betalbatim Beach,
  - Colva Beach,
  - Sernabatim Beach,
  - Benaulim Beach,
  - Varca Beach,
  - Cavelossim Beach,
  - Mobor Beach,
  - Betul Beach
- Quepem
  - Canaiguinim Beach
- Canacona
  - Cabo de rama Beach,
  - Kakolem Beach,
  - Dharvalem Beach,
  - Cola Beach,
  - Agonda Beach,
  - Palolem Beach,
  - Patnem Beach,
  - Rajbag Beach,
  - Talpona Beach,
  - Galgibag Beach,
  - Polem Beach

== Sea plane service ==
The government of Goa conducted trials of a seaplane on the Mandovi river on 23 May 2015. The test plane took off from Dabolim airport and successfully landed in the Mandovi river. The seaplane service had started post-monsoon since 2015.

== Wildlife ==
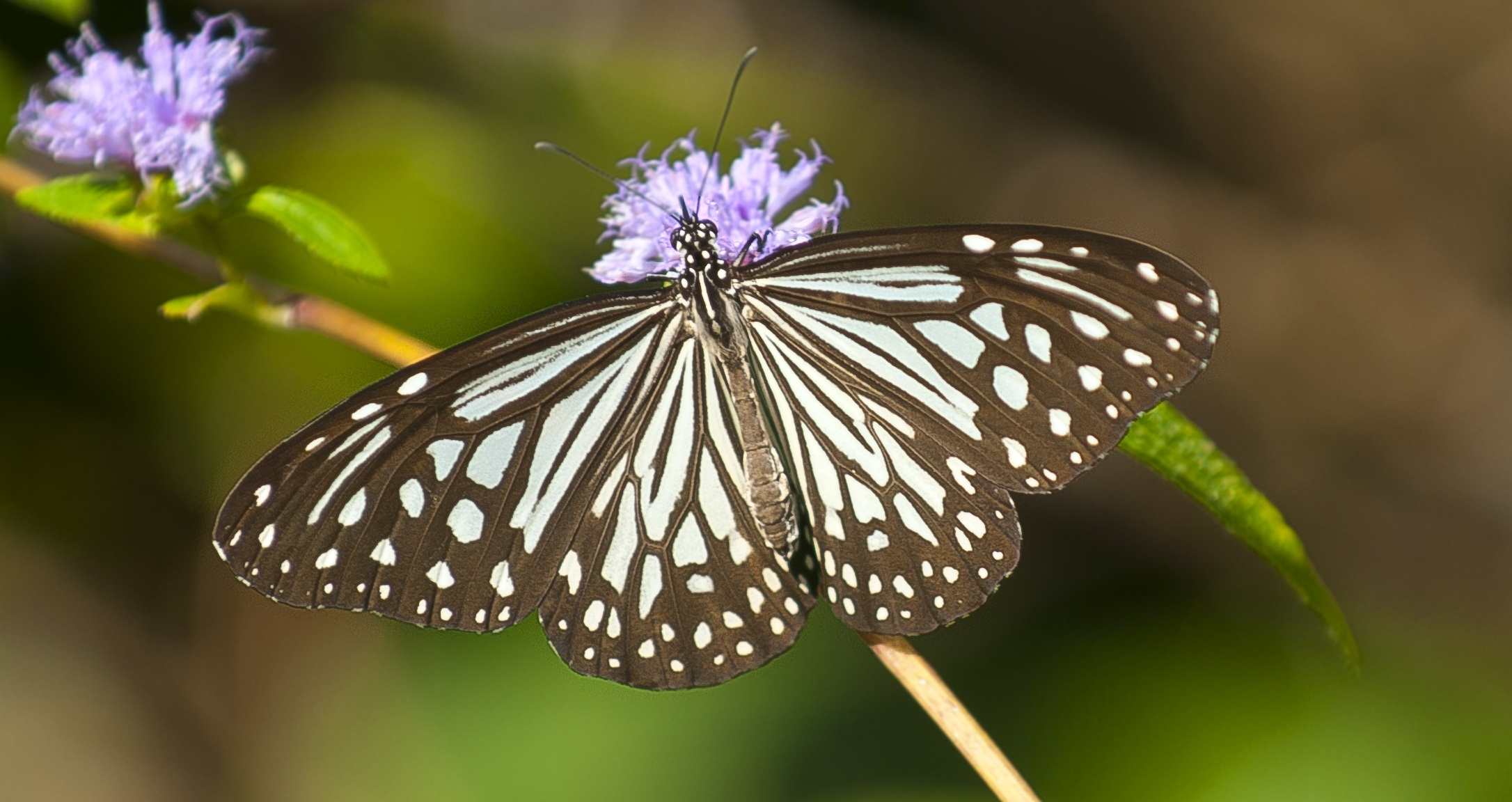
The glassy tiger butterfly spotted at Mhadei Wildlife Sanctuary

Bondla Wildlife Sanctuary, the Bhagwan Mahaveer Sanctuary, and Mollem National Park, Cotigao Wildlife Sanctuary, Mhadei Wildlife Sanctuary and Netravali Wildlife Sanctuary harbour Goa's rich bio-diversity. Foxes, wild boars, and migratory birds are also found in the forests of Goa. The avifauna includes kingfishers, mynas, and parrots. The famous Dudhsagar Falls, India's fifth tallest at 310 metres, is located inside Bhagwan Mahaveer Sanctuary at the Goa – Karnataka border.

The renowned Salim Ali Bird Sanctuary is located on the island of Chorao. The endangered olive ridley sea turtle can be found on Morjim Beach in Pernem, Northern Goa, and Galgibaga Beach in Canacona, Southern Goa. The turtles are listed in Schedule I of the Indian Wildlife Act. Morjim Beach is also hosting to a number of migratory birds from late September to early April. The area surrounding the shore at Tembwada in Morjim also abounds in various species of birds. A number of international bird-watching tours are organised in the area.

== Waterfalls ==
- Dudhsagar Falls
- Arvalem Falls
- Kuske falls
- Kesarval Falls
- Tambdi Surla Falls
- Charavane falls

== Museums ==
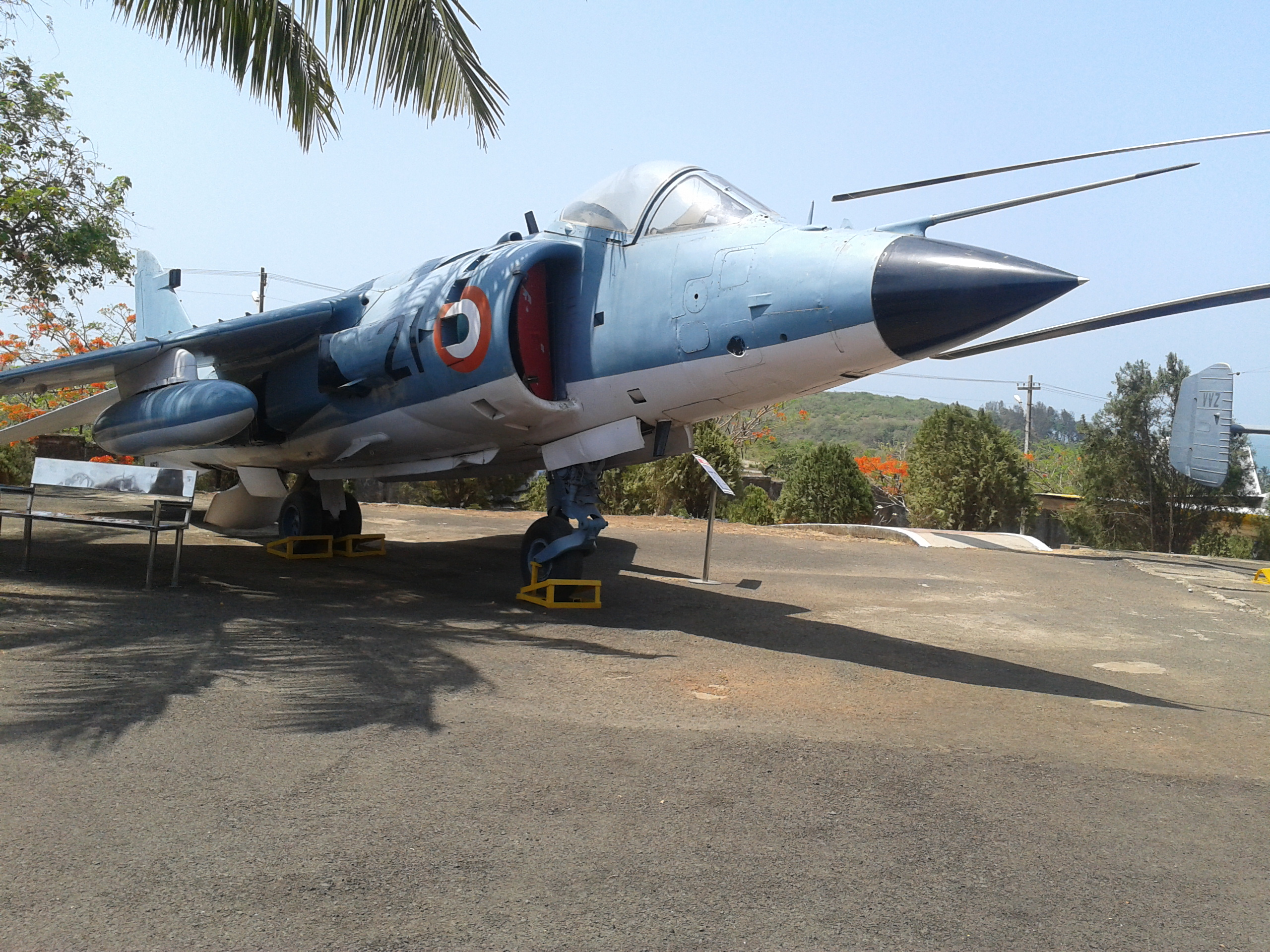
A Sea Harrier on display at the Naval Air Museum

There are several museums located in Goa:

- The Goa State Museum set up in 1996 aims at centralising and preserving antiquities, art objects and objects of cultural importance, depicting the different aspects of the Goan History and Culture. It is located at Patto in Goa's capital city of Panaji.
- The Naval Aviation Museum near Dabolim is one among three of its kind in India.
- Goa Science Centre, located at the Miramar beach in Panaji. was opened in December 2001 and it houses many wonders of Science and Astronomy.
- Archaeological Museum and Portrait Gallery located in Old Goa is run by the Archaeological Survey of India.
- The Museum of Christian Art has a number of paintings, sculptures and religious silverware dating back to the 16th century.
- 'Ancestral Goa' is dedicated to the preservation of art, culture and environment and was established to preserve Goa's past and its rich traditions. This magnificent project is the result of a lot of meticulous research, planning and hardwork. Located in Loutolim, it opened to the public in April 1995. A special attraction of this project is the sculpture of Sant Mirabai strumming on her tambori and measuring 14 meters by 5 meters which was chiseled in Greco – Roman style from a vast expanse of laterite stone by Maendra Jocelino Araujo Alvares in just 30 days.
- The Big Foot Museum is located at 'Ancestral Goa' in Loutolim. It has an unusual collection of crosses, from all over the world.
- The Museum of Goa is a privately owned museum of art in Pilerne, Goa. MOG, as it is commonly known, is one of the largest contemporary art spaces in India. Founded by the artist, Dr. Subodh Kerkar, in 2015, MOG tries to depict Goan history and culture through modern art. The Museum is also an active cultural space, hosting events, talks, workshops and discussions. MOG hosts exhibitions all year round, with its largest being the Goa Affordable Art Fest which often starts in December and lasts till the end of January.
- The Pilar Museum is located on the Pilar hillock where the Pilar Seminary is also located. The Museum was founded by Fr Costa, and highlights various finds on and around the Pilar hillock and now preserved in the seminary museum.
- The 'Wax World' Museum, inaugurated in 2008 is located in Old Goa contains exquisite wax statues. The statues have been sculpted by Shreeji Bhaskaran, who owns the museum and is also responsible for giving India its first wax museum located at Ooty, Karnataka, which was set up in March 2007.
- 'Goa Chitra Museum', established by Victor Hugo Gomes, is an ethnographic museum in Benaulim showcasing traditional Goan farming implements and other Goan antiques.
- Ashvek Vintage World is a vintage car museum located in Nuvem, Goa. Set up in 2004 by Pradeep Naik, it is Goa's first car museum.

== Heritage homes ==
Another major tourist attraction in Goa is its heritage homes. A legacy of the Portuguese colonial regime of more than 450 years, some of these palatial homes are now converted into hotels while many are still inhabited by the people. The popular heritage homes in Goa are:

- The Fernandes house, also known as 'Voddlem Ghor' in Cotta is an architectural marvel in Chandor.
- The Menezes Bragança House in Chandor was built circa 1730. It was once owned by Luís de Menezes Bragança, Tristão de Bragança Cunha, Beatriz de Menezes Bragança, and her sister Berta Menezes Bragança.
- The Vivian Coutinho House in Fatorda is among the few Goan houses with decorative Azulejo tiles.

== Forts ==
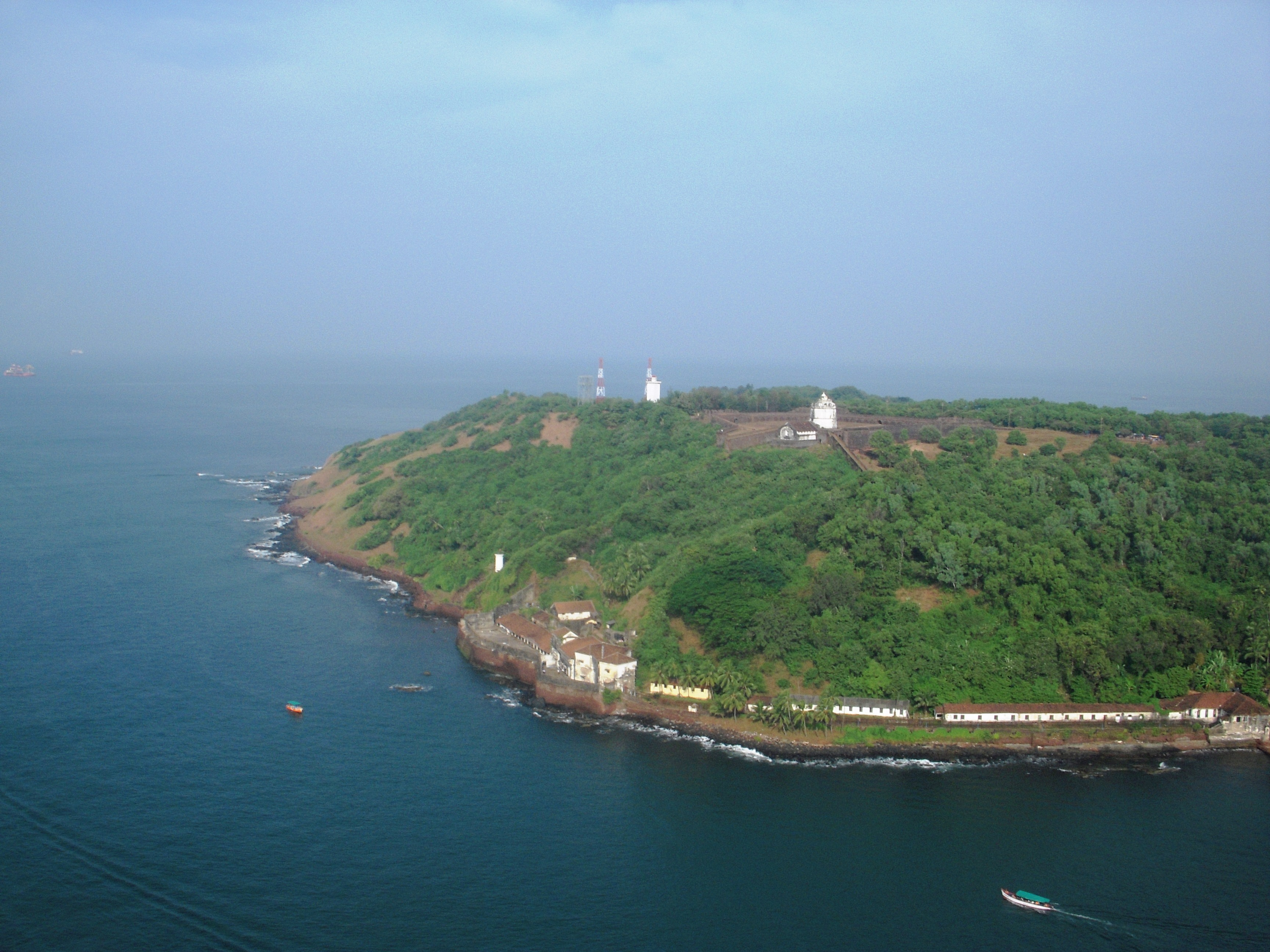
Fort Aguada

The landscape of Goa is dotted with several forts.

1. Aguada Fort
2. Alorna Fort
3. Anjediva Fort
4. Betul Fort
5. Cabo de Rama
6. Chandor Fort
7. Chapora Fort
8. Corjuem Fort
9. Gandaulim Fort
10. Gaspar Dias Fort
11. Mormugão Fort
12. Nanuz Fort
13. Naroa Fort
14. Palácio do Cabo
15. Ponda Fort
16. Rachol Fort
17. Reis Magos
18. Sanquelim Fort
19. Fortaleza de São Sebastião
20. São Tiago of Banastarim Fort
21. São Tomé of Tivim Fort
22. St Estevam Fort
23. Tiracol Fort
24. Fort São Bartolomeu

== Entertainment & Gaming ==
In accordance with The Goa, Daman and Diu Public Gambling Act of 1976, Gaming and Casino facilities are legally allowed to be registered and operated after approaching the Government. However, Casinos are only operational in Goa currently, due to the Local Government stay orders in Daman & Diu. In Goa, Offshore Casinos are operated by Delta Corp, Pride Group (Not be confused with Bangaladesh Textile Group), and Big Daddy. Current Casino Vessels include Deltin Royale, Deltin JAQK, King's Casino (formerly Caravela), Casino Pride, Magestic Pride, and Big Daddy Casino.

Apart from Offshore vessels, Delta Corp, and the Pride Group operate Casinos in land. Most star hotel properties also have smaller casino setups inside them.

The Mandovi River also houses pleasure cruises and rides in the evening. These are rides on large and medium sized vessels in the river which serves as an attraction for the public.

== List of monuments of national importance ==
SL. No.	Description	Location	Address	District	Coordinates	Image
N-GA-1	Basilica of Bom Jesus	Old Goa		Old Goa		Basilica of Bom Jesus [[:commons:Category:Basilica of Bom Jesus (Goa)|More images]]
N-GA-2	Se Cathedral	Old Goa		Old Goa		Se Cathedral More images
N-GA-3	St. Cajetan Church	Old Goa		Old Goa		St. Cajetan Church More images
N-GA-4	Church and Convent of St. Francis of Assisi	Old Goa		Old Goa		Church and Convent of St. Francis of Assisi More images
N-GA-5	Chapel of St. Catherine	Old Goa		Old Goa		Chapel of St. Catherine More images
N-GA-6	Church of Our Lady of the Rosary	Old Goa		Old Goa		Church of Our Lady of the Rosary More images
N-GA-7	Portal remains of St.Paul’s College	Old Goa		Old Goa		Portal remains of St.Paul’s College
N-GA-8	Arch of Viceroy	Old Goa		Old Goa		Arch of Viceroy
N-GA-9	Arch of Adil Shah’s Palace	Old Goa		Old Goa		Arch of Adil Shah’s Palace
N-GA-10	Church of St. Augustine, Goa	Old Goa		Old Goa		Church of St. Augustine, Goa More images
N-GA-11	Aguada Fort (Upper)	Candolim		Goa		Aguada Fort (Upper) More images
N-GA-12	Safa Mosque, Goa	Ponda		Goa		Safa Mosque, Goa More images
N-GA-13	Rock cut caves	Arvalem		Goa		Rock cut caves More images
N-GA-14	Mahadev Temple, Tambdi Surla	Tamdisurla		Goa		Mahadev Temple, Tambdi Surla More images
N-GA-15	Mahadev Temple	Kurdi		Goa		Mahadev Temple
N-GA-16	Excavated site	Chandore		Goa		Excavated site More images
N-GA-17	Fortification Wall of Aguada Fort (Lower)	Candolim		Goa		Fortification Wall of Aguada Fort (Lower)
N-GA-18	Chapel of St. Francis Xavier and connected buildings	Old Goa		Old Goa		Chapel of St. Francis Xavier and connected buildings More images
N-GA-19	House of Bull	Old Goa		Old Goa		House of Bull More images
N-GA-20	Largo of St. Francis Xavier	Old Goa		Old Goa		Largo of St. Francis Xavier
N-GA-21	Largo of St. Cajetan together with other monuments	Old Goa		Old Goa		Largo of St. Cajetan together with other monuments

== List of state protected monuments ==
SL. No.	Description	Location	Address	District	Coordinates	Image
S-GA-1	Site where the ancient image of Buddha was discovered at Colvale	Bardez				Upload Photo
S-GA-2	Fortress of Colvale	Bardez				Upload Photo
S-GA-3	Reis Magos Fort	Bardez				Reis Magos Fort More images
S-GA-4	Church of Reis Magos	Bardez				Church of Reis Magos
S-GA-5	Chapora Fort	Bardez				Chapora Fort
S-GA-6	Corjuem Fort	Bardez				Upload Photo
S-GA-7	Cabo de Rama Fort	Canacona				Upload Photo
S-GA-8	Caves at Naroa	Bicholim				Upload Photo
S-GA-9	Temples of Saptakoteshwar	Bicholim				Temples of Saptakoteshwar More images
S-GA-10	Site of Gujir	Bicholim				Upload Photo
S-GA-11	Fort of Sanquelim	Bicholim				Upload Photo
S-GA-12	Namazgah	Bicholim				Upload Photo
S-GA-13	The Cave of Sidhanath at Tar Surla	Bicholim				Upload Photo
S-GA-14	The Mosque and Tank at Tar Surla	Bicholim				Upload Photo
S-GA-15	Mormugão fort	Mormugao				Upload Photo
S-GA-16	The Site of Kaivailya Math at Consua	Marmagoa				Upload Photo
S-GA-17	Frontispices of Sancoale	Mormugao				Frontispices of Sancoale
S-GA-18	Shri Saptakoteshwar	Ponda				Upload Photo
S-GA-19	Shri Mahadev Temple	Ponda				Shri Mahadev Temple
S-GA-20	Ruins of Jain Basti	Ponda				Upload Photo
S-GA-21	Fort of Alorna	Pernem				Upload Photo
S-GA-22	Fort Tiracol	Pernem				Fort Tiracol
S-GA-23	Caves at Khandepar	Ponda				Upload Photo
S-GA-24	Cave at Ishwarbhat	Ponda				Upload Photo
S-GA-25	Cave at Mangeshi	Ponda				Cave at Mangeshi More images
S-GA-26	Shri Nagesh Temple	Ponda				Shri Nagesh Temple More images
S-GA-27	Shri Kamakshi Temple	Ponda				Shri Kamakshi Temple More images
S-GA-28	Shri Chandranath Paroda	Quepem				Upload Photo
S-GA-29	Site of Rock Carvings of Kazur	Quepem				Upload Photo
S-GA-30	Site of Ruins of Mangueshi Temple	Salcete				Site of Ruins of Mangueshi Temple
S-GA-31	Site of Ruins of Shanta Durga Temple	Salcete				Site of Ruins of Shanta Durga Temple More images
S-GA-32	Site – Ruins of Ramnath Temple	Salcete				Upload Photo
S-GA-33	Ruins including Tank of the Temple of Mahalsa	Salcete				Upload Photo
S-GA-34	Gate of Rachol Fortress	Salcete				Upload Photo
S-GA-35	Caves of Aquem	Salcete				Upload Photo
S-GA-36	Caves at Rivona	Sanguem				Upload Photo
S-GA-37	Site of Rock Carving at Pansaimal	Sanguem				Site of Rock Carving at Pansaimal
S-GA-38	The Cave at Shigoa	Sanguem				Upload Photo
S-GA-39	The site of Narayandev at Vichundre	Sanguem				Upload Photo
S-GA-40	Ruins of Brahmapuri	Tiswadi				Upload Photo
S-GA-41	Chapel of St. Xavier	Tiswadi				Chapel of St. Xavier
S-GA-42	Chapel of Our Lady of the Mount	Tiswadi				Chapel of Our Lady of the Mount
S-GA-43	Convent of St. Monica and Chapel	Tiswadi				Convent of St. Monica and Chapel
S-GA-44	Ruins of College of St. Paulo	Tiswadi				Upload Photo
S-GA-45	Church of St. Peter	Tiswadi				Church of St. Peter
S-GA-46	Casa da Polvora	Tiswadi				Upload Photo
S-GA-47	Fort Naroa	Tiswadi				Fort Naroa
S-GA-48	Site of the Temple of Saptakoteshwar	Tiswadi				Upload Photo
S-GA-49	Chapel of St. Jeronimus	Tiswadi				Upload Photo
S-GA-50	British Cemetery at Dona Paula	Tiswadi				British Cemetery at Dona Paula
S-GA-51	The Site of Fortress at St Estevam	Tiswadi				The Site of Fortress at St Estevam

== Administration ==
The administration of tourism in Goa lies with Minister for Tourism, Manohar Ajgaonkar, and Secretary and Director for Tourism, Menino D'Souza. Other stakeholders in Goa tourism are the Goa Tourism Development Corporation (A Government of Goa undertaking) and the Travel and Tourism Association of Goa (TTAG). Prachi Desai has been appointed as the face of Goa's Tourism.

=== Goa Tourism Development Corporation ===
The Goa Tourism Development Corporation Ltd. (GTDC) carries out tourism commercial activities like conducting sight seeing tours and river cruises. It also manages 12 hotels with a total of 525 rooms. Also, tourist can opt-in from tourism site in India. They are recognised by tourism minister of India, the government of India to boost Indian tourism sector by providing a world-class tour to tourist.

== See also ==
- Damaon territory
- Portuguese in Goa and Bombay
- Indo-Portuguese
- LGBTQ rights in Goa
- Christianity in India
- Tourism in India
- Timeline of Goan history
- Outline of tourism in India
