= List of Monuments of National Importance in Goa =

This is a list of Monuments of National Importance as officially recognized by and available through the website of the Archaeological Survey of India (ASI) in the Indian state Goa. The monument identifier is a combination of the abbreviation of the subdivision of the list (state, ASI circle) and the numbering as published on the website of the ASI. 21 Monuments of National Importance have been recognised by the ASI in Goa.

== List of monuments of national importance ==
SL. No.	Description	Location	Address	District	Coordinates	Image
N-GA-1	Arvalem rock cut caves	Arvalem		North Goa	15°33′09″N 74°01′23″E	Arvalem rock cut caves More images
N-GA-2	Aguada Fort (Upper)	Candolim		North Goa	15°29′30″N 73°46′26″E	Aguada Fort (Upper) More images
N-GA-3	Fortification Wall of Aguada Fort (Lower)	Candolim		North Goa	15°29′26″N 73°46′16″E	Fortification Wall of Aguada Fort (Lower)
N-GA-4	Arch of Adil Shah’s Palace	Old Goa		North Goa	15°30′20″N 73°54′51″E	Arch of Adil Shah’s Palace
N-GA-5	Arch of Viceroy	Old Goa		North Goa	15°30′21″N 73°54′49″E	Arch of Viceroy
N-GA-6	Basilica of Bom Jesus	Old Goa		North Goa	15°30′03″N 73°54′41″E	Basilica of Bom Jesus [[:commons:Category:Basilica of Bom Jesus (Goa)|More images]]
N-GA-7	Chapel of St. Cajetan	Old Goa		North Goa	15°30′20″N 73°54′54″E	Chapel of St. Cajetan More images
N-GA-8	Chapel of St. Catherine	Old Goa		North Goa	15°30′12″N 73°54′38″E	Chapel of St. Catherine More images
N-GA-9	Chapel of St. Francis Xavier and connected buildings	Old Goa		Old Goa	15°30′03″N 73°55′09″E	Chapel of St. Francis Xavier and connected buildings More images
N-GA-10	Church and Convent of St. Francis of Assisi	Old Goa		North Goa	15°30′11″N 73°54′40″E	Church and Convent of St. Francis of Assisi More images
N-GA-11	Church of Our Lady of the Rosary	Old Goa		North Goa	15°30′06″N 73°54′18″E	Church of Our Lady of the Rosary More images
N-GA-12	Church of St. Augustine, Goa	Old Goa		North Goa	15°30′02″N 73°54′23″E	Church of St. Augustine, Goa More images
N-GA-13	House of Bull	Old Goa		Old Goa	15°30′15″N 73°54′50″E	House of Bull More images
N-GA-14	Largo of St. Cajetan together with other monuments	Old Goa		Old Goa	15°30′20″N 73°54′53″E	Largo of St. Cajetan together with other monuments
N-GA-15	Largo of St. Francis Xavier	Old Goa		Old Goa	15°30′08″N 73°54′42″E	Largo of St. Francis Xavier
N-GA-16	Portal remains of St.Paul’s College	Old Goa		North Goa	15°29′57″N 73°55′06″E	Portal remains of St.Paul’s College
N-GA-17	Se Cathedral	Old Goa		North Goa	15°30′14″N 73°54′44″E	Se Cathedral More images
N-GA-18	Safa Mosque, Goa	Ponda		North Goa	15°24′24″N 74°00′00″E	Safa Mosque, Goa More images
N-GA-19	Excavated site	Chandore		South Goa	15°15′31″N 74°03′16″E	Excavated site More images
N-GA-20	Mahadev Temple	Kurdi		South Goa	15°09′15″N 74°09′59″E	Mahadev Temple
N-GA-21	Mahadev Temple, Tambdi Surla	Tambdisurla		South Goa	15°26′21″N 74°15′09″E	Mahadev Temple, Tambdi Surla More images

== See also ==
- List of State Protected Monuments in Goa
- Lists of Indian Monuments of National Importance
