= List of State Protected Monuments in Goa =

This is a list of State Protected Monuments as officially reported by and available through the website of the Archaeological Survey of India in the Indian state Goa. The monument identifier is a combination of the abbreviation of the subdivision of the list (state, ASI circle) and the numbering as published on the website of the ASI. 51 State Protected Monuments have been recognised by the ASI in Goa. Besides the State Protected Monuments, also the Monuments of National Importance in this state might be relevant.

== List of state protected monuments ==
SL. No.	Description	Location	Address	District	Coordinates	Image
S-GA-1	Site where the ancient image of Buddha was discovered at Colvale	Bardez				Upload Photo
S-GA-2	Fortress of Colvale	Bardez			15°38′06″N 73°51′02″E	Upload Photo
S-GA-3	Reis Magos Fort	Bardez			15°29′47″N 73°48′33″E	Reis Magos Fort More images
S-GA-4	Church of Reis Magos	Bardez			15°29′52″N 73°48′33″E	Church of Reis Magos
S-GA-5	Chapora Fort	Bardez			15°36′19″N 73°44′12″E	Chapora Fort
S-GA-6	The Fortress of Khorjuve	Bardez			15°35′48″N 73°53′34″E	Upload Photo
S-GA-7	Cabo de Rama Fort	Canacona			15°05′20″N 73°55′18″E	Upload Photo
S-GA-8	Caves at Naroa	Bicholim			15°33′19″N 73°56′06″E	Upload Photo
S-GA-9	Temples of Saptakoteshwar	Bicholim			15°33′15″N 73°56′14″E	Temples of Saptakoteshwar More images
S-GA-10	Site of Gujir	Bicholim			15°32′42″N 74°00′27″E	Upload Photo
S-GA-11	Fort of Sanquelim	Bicholim			15°34′00″N 74°00′25″E	Upload Photo
S-GA-12	Namazgah	Bicholim			15°34′57″N 73°56′46″E	Upload Photo
S-GA-13	The Cave of Sidhanath at Tar Surla	Bicholim			15°29′59″N 74°01′28″E	Upload Photo
S-GA-14	The Mosque and Tank at Tar Surla	Bicholim			15°29′51″N 74°01′07″E	Upload Photo
S-GA-15	The Fort of Marmagoa	Marmagoa			15°24′42″N 73°47′39″E	Upload Photo
S-GA-16	The Site of Kaivailya Math at Consua	Marmagoa			15°22′18″N 73°55′28″E	Upload Photo
S-GA-17	Frontispices of Sancoale	Mormugao			15°24′23″N 73°53′35″E	Frontispices of Sancoale
S-GA-18	Shri Saptakoteshwar	Ponda			15°25′10″N 74°02′53″E	Upload Photo
S-GA-19	Shri Mahadev Temple	Ponda			15°26′42″N 73°57′59″E	Shri Mahadev Temple
S-GA-20	Ruins of Jain Basti	Ponda			15°24′21″N 73°59′00″E	Upload Photo
S-GA-21	Fort of Alorna	Pernem			15°42′01″N 73°54′19″E	Upload Photo
S-GA-22	Fort of Terekhol	Pernem			15°43′17″N 73°41′12″E	Fort of Terekhol
S-GA-23	Caves at Khandepar	Ponda			15°25′45″N 74°02′59″E	Upload Photo
S-GA-24	Cave at Ishwarbhat	Ponda			15°26′36″N 74°02′28″E	Upload Photo
S-GA-25	Cave at Mangeshi	Ponda			15°27′17″N 73°57′58″E	Cave at Mangeshi More images
S-GA-26	Shri Nagesh Temple	Ponda			15°24′27″N 73°59′01″E	Shri Nagesh Temple More images
S-GA-27	Shri Kamakshi Temple	Ponda			15°19′15″N 74°02′05″E	Shri Kamakshi Temple More images
S-GA-28	Shri Chandranath Paroda	Quepem			15°12′48″N 74°02′12″E	Upload Photo
S-GA-29	Site of Rock Carvings of Kazur	Quepem			15°04′42″N 74°09′41″E	Upload Photo
S-GA-30	Site of Ruins of Mangueshi Temple	Salcete			15°23′21″N 73°55′15″E	Site of Ruins of Mangueshi Temple
S-GA-31	Site of Ruins of Shanta Durga Temple	Salcete			15°23′15″N 73°56′19″E	Site of Ruins of Shanta Durga Temple More images
S-GA-32	Site – Ruins of Ramnath Temple	Salcete			15°20′32″N 73°58′50″E	Upload Photo
S-GA-33	Ruins including Tank of the Temple of Mahalsa	Salcete			15°21′33″N 73°56′39″E	Upload Photo
S-GA-34	Gate of Rachol Fortress	Salcete			15°18′31″N 74°00′03″E	Upload Photo
S-GA-35	Caves of Aquem	Salcete			15°16′21″N 73°58′15″E	Upload Photo
S-GA-36	Caves at Rivona	Sanguem			15°09′41″N 74°06′37″E	Upload Photo
S-GA-37	Site of Rock Carving at Pansaimal / Usgalimal	Sanguem			15°07′15″N 74°07′59″E	Site of Rock Carving at Pansaimal / Usgalimal
S-GA-38	The Cave at Shigao	Sanguem			15°19′51″N 74°12′03″E	Upload Photo
S-GA-39	The site of Narayandev at Vichundre	Sanguem			15°06′06″N 74°11′36″E	Upload Photo
S-GA-40	Ruins of Brahmapuri	Tiswadi			15°29′24″N 73°54′58″E	Upload Photo
S-GA-41	Chapel of St. Xavier	Tiswadi			15°30′03″N 73°55′09″E	Chapel of St. Xavier
S-GA-42	Chapel of Our Lady of the Mount	Tiswadi			15°30′16″N 73°55′24″E	Chapel of Our Lady of the Mount
S-GA-43	Convent of St. Monica and Chapel	Tiswadi			15°30′05″N 73°54′27″E	Convent of St. Monica and Chapel
S-GA-44	Ruins of College of St. Populo	Tiswadi			15°29′55″N 73°54′21″E	Upload Photo
S-GA-45	Church of St. Peter	Tiswadi			15°30′01″N 73°53′50″E	Church of St. Peter
S-GA-46	Casa da Polvora	Tiswadi			15°30′10″N 73°54′37″E	Upload Photo
S-GA-47	Fort Naroa	Tiswadi			15°32′17″N 73°55′20″E	Fort Naroa
S-GA-48	Site of the Temple of Saptakoteshwar	Tiswadi			15°31′53″N 73°55′34″E	Upload Photo
S-GA-49	Chapel of St. Jeronimus	Tiswadi			15°31′38″N 73°52′39″E	Upload Photo
S-GA-50	British Cemetery at Dona Paula	Tiswadi			15°27′30″N 73°47′52″E	British Cemetery at Dona Paula
S-GA-51	The Site of Fortress at St Estevam	Tiswadi			15°32′10″N 73°57′16″E	The Site of Fortress at St Estevam

== See also ==
- List of Monuments of National Importance in Goa
- List of State Protected Monuments in India
