= Galgibaga Beach =

Beach in Goa, India

Coordinates: 14.960°N 74.049°E

Galgibaga Beach also called Galgibagh Beach is a beach in Kushavati district. It is one of the lesser-known and cleanest beaches of India. It is located in the state of Goa in Canacona region, 7 km from the famous Palolem Beach. Galgibaga beach is reported to be a nesting ground for Olive Ridley turtles.

== Ecology ==
Galgibaga Beach is one of the three officially designated nesting sites for Olive Ridley turtles in Goa, alongside Agonda and Morjim beaches. These beaches are under the jurisdiction of Goa’s Forest Department, which implements seasonal restrictions to ensure a safe environment for turtle nesting. Nesting typically occurs during the winter months, with the first sightings often recorded around December or January. In a related case at Agonda Beach, the first Olive Ridley turtle of the season was documented laying 65 eggs in January 2024.

== Tourism and conservation ==
The beach is noted for balancing tourism with conservation efforts. Due to the presence of turtle nesting, infrastructure development in the area remains limited. Accommodations near the beach are sparse and small-scale, contributing to the relatively undisturbed nature of the site. Visitors are expected to follow guidelines that prevent disturbance to turtle nesting grounds, such as avoiding bright lights and noise pollution during nesting season.

== Location ==
Galgibaga Beach is located approximately 7 km from the popular Palolem Beach and is accessible by road. It remains relatively secluded compared to other Goan beaches.

== See also ==
- Tourism in Goa
