= Chapel of St. Catherine =

UNESCO world heritage site in India

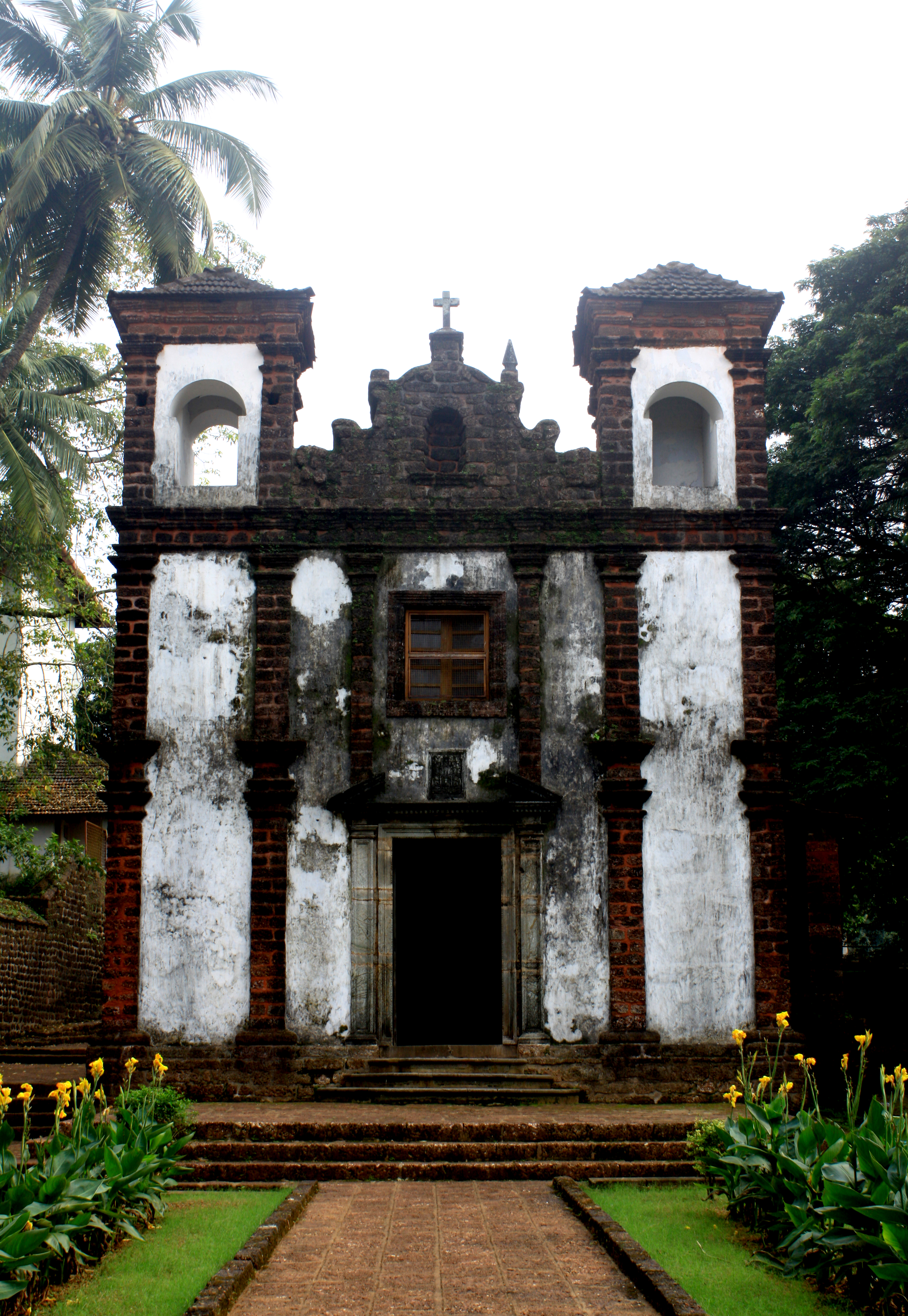

- 15.503438°N 73.910437°E
- Location: Velha Goa, State of Goa
- Country: India
- Previous denomination: Roman Catholic

History
- Founded: 1510; 516 years ago
- Founder: Afonso de Albuquerque

Architecture
- Functional status: Non-functional

The Chapel of St. Catherine (Portuguese: Capela de Santa Catarina) is a UNESCO World Heritage Site located in Old Goa in the same compound as Se Cathedral and the Church and Convent of St. Francis of Assisi. It was built in 1510 in the Baroque architectural style, and has a brown and white facade. It faces the Mandovi River and is part of the World Heritage Site, Churches and convents of Goa. The chapel is not functional.

== History ==
It was erected by Afonso de Albuquerque, Portuguese conqueror, in 1510 to commemorate his victorious entry to the city of Goa on St Catherine's Day. Pope Paul III granted it status of cathedral in 1534 and it was rebuilt. The chapel was expanded in 1550 at the order of the governor Jorge Cabral, and a new altarpiece was installed as well.
