= Safa Mosque, Goa =

Mosque in Goa, India

Safa Mosque
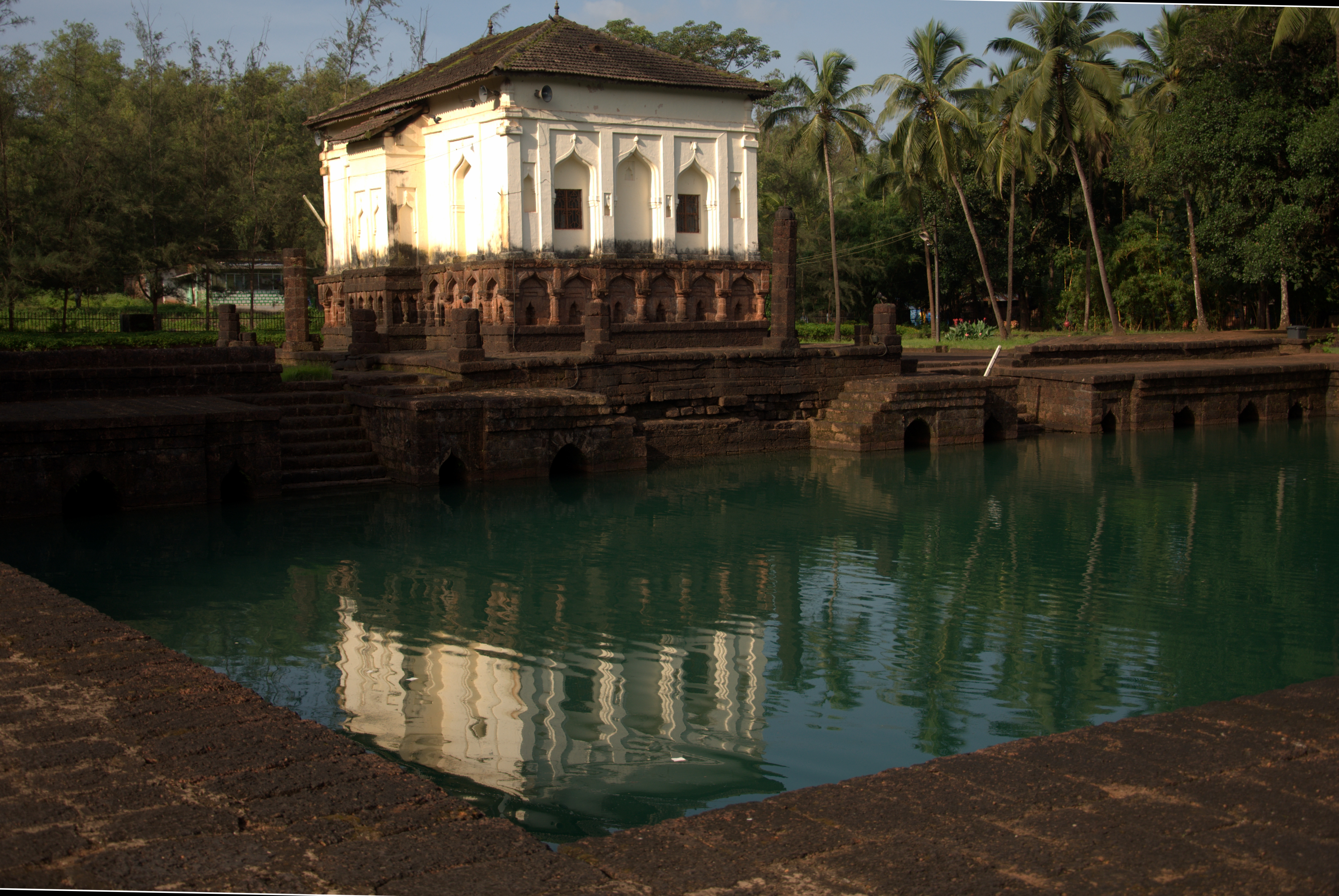
- The mosque in 2012

- Location of the mosque in Goa

Religion
- Affiliation: Islam
- Ecclesiastical or organizational status: Mosque
- Status: Active

Location
- Location: Ponda, Goa
- Country: India
- Interactive map of Safa Mosque
- Coordinates: 15°24′N 74°01′E

Architecture
- Type: Mosque architecture
- Style: Islamic
- Completed: c. 1560

Monument of National Importance
- Official name: Safa Mosque, Goa
- Reference no.: N-GA-18

The Safa Mosque, also known as the Safa Shahouri Mosque, is a mosque located at Ponda within Goa, India. The mosque has a complex consisting of garden and fountains. The terracotta tile roof accommodates a rectangular prayer hall. Completed in the 16th century, the mosque is an ASI-protected Monument of National Importance in Goa.

== History ==
According to V. T. Gune, the mosque was built in 1560 by the Bijapuri ruler Ibrahim Adil Shah I, approximately 2 kilometres (1.2 mi) from centre of Ponda. The mosque may be datable to the Adil shah period or even earlier. However, as the mosque doesn't bear any inscription nor is there historical records that mention its construction, the exact date is unknown. During Portuguese Goa, the mosque was damaged and burned by the Portuguese. The mosque was left in ruins until it was partially reconstructed in the 1980s.

== Gallery ==
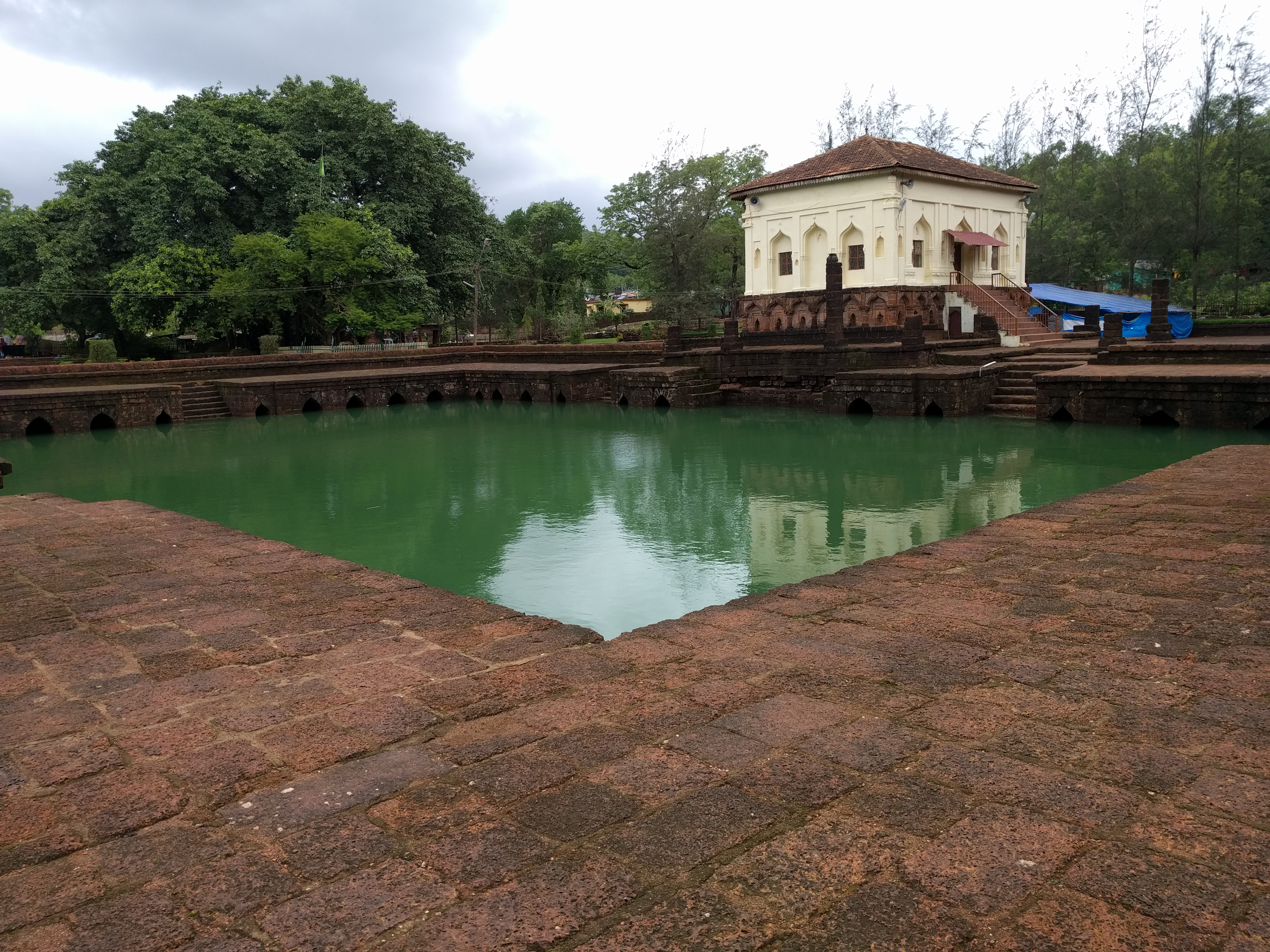
Safa Masjid adjacent to which, on the south, is a masonry tank measuring 30 by 30 m (98 by 98 ft), with Mihrab designs

== See also ==
- Islam in India
- List of mosques in India
