= Church of Our Lady of the Rosary, Goa =

Church of Our Lady of the Rosary
- Igreja de Nossa Senhora do Rosário (Portuguese)
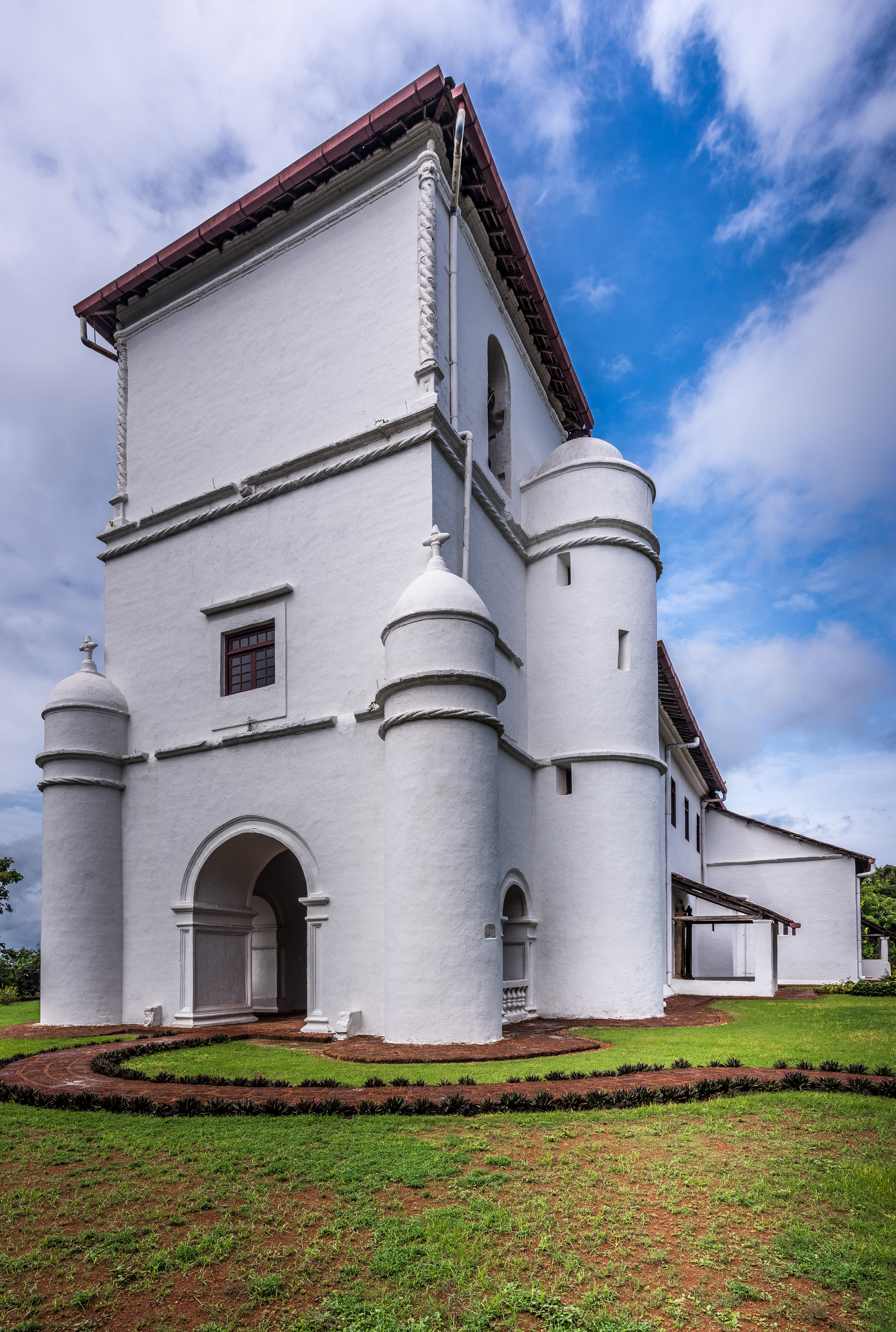
- Church of Our Lady of the Rosary
- 15.4229°N 73.7713°E
- Location: Old Goa, State of Goa
- Country: India
- Denomination: Catholic Church

History
- Founder: Afonso de Albuquerque

Architecture
- Architectural type: a fortress church which is cruciform on plan
- Style: Manueline and Gothic styles
- Years built: 1544-1547

UNESCO World Heritage Site
- Type: Cultural
- Designated: 1986
- Part of: Churches and Convents of Goa

The Church of Our Lady of the Rosary is a Catholic church built between 1544 and 1547, in Old Goa, State of Goa, India. This church is part of the collection belonging to the World Heritage Site of churches and convents of Goa.

== History ==
According to the Portuguese historian Gaspar Correia, the Portuguese nobleman Afonso de Albuquerque ordered a small chapel to be built in honor of Our Lady of the Rosary on the spot where he was standing, when he had received the confirmation that his soldiers had completed the Portuguese conquest of Goa in 1510. The master-builder Antão Nogueira de Brito then designed a small chapel on the place, which was a hill called the Monte Santo (Holy Mountain) by the Portuguese.

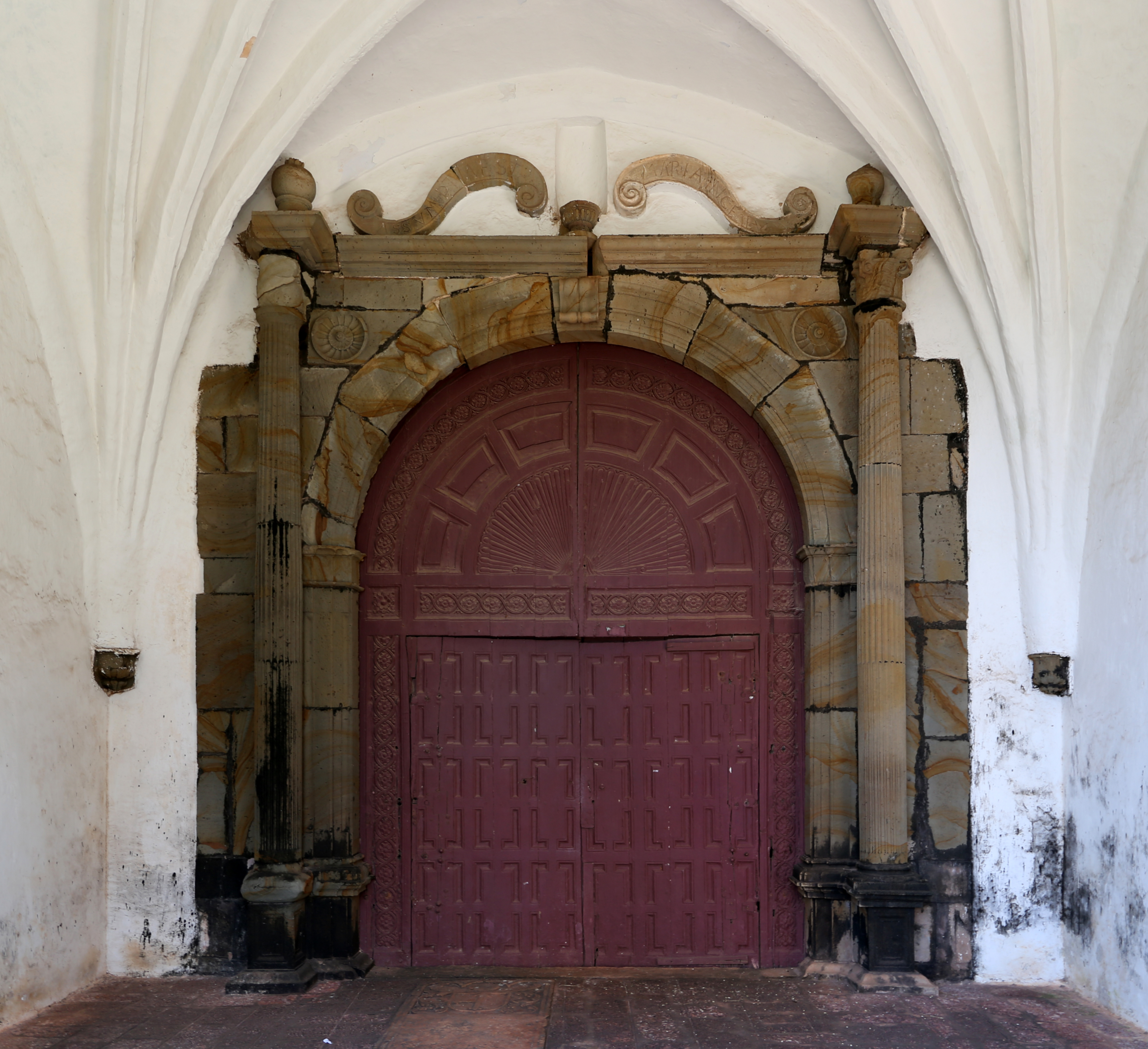
The main portal

Over 30 years later, many Goan Catholics were living in Monte Santo and the Portuguese rulers recognized that the settlement needed a separate parish with its own church. However, there is little information about the construction of the church building, except that it began in 1543 along with two other religious buildings in the city – the Church of Our Lady of the Candles (Portuguese: Igreja de Nossa Senhora da Luz) and the Chapel of Saint Catherine (Portuguese: Capela de Santa Catarina). Thus the city of Goa, the capital of the Portuguese territory in India, initially had only three parishes and three churches. A letter from the members of the chapel's confraria to King João III of Portugal in 1548 revealed that the present church building resulted from the enlargement of the original chapel.

In 1843 Pangim (Nova Goa) officially became the administrative headquarters of Portuguese India, replacing the city of Goa (which then came to be known as Goa Velha). Thus the importance of this particular church declined. The church was renovated in 1897–1899.

== Architecture ==
=== Exterior ===
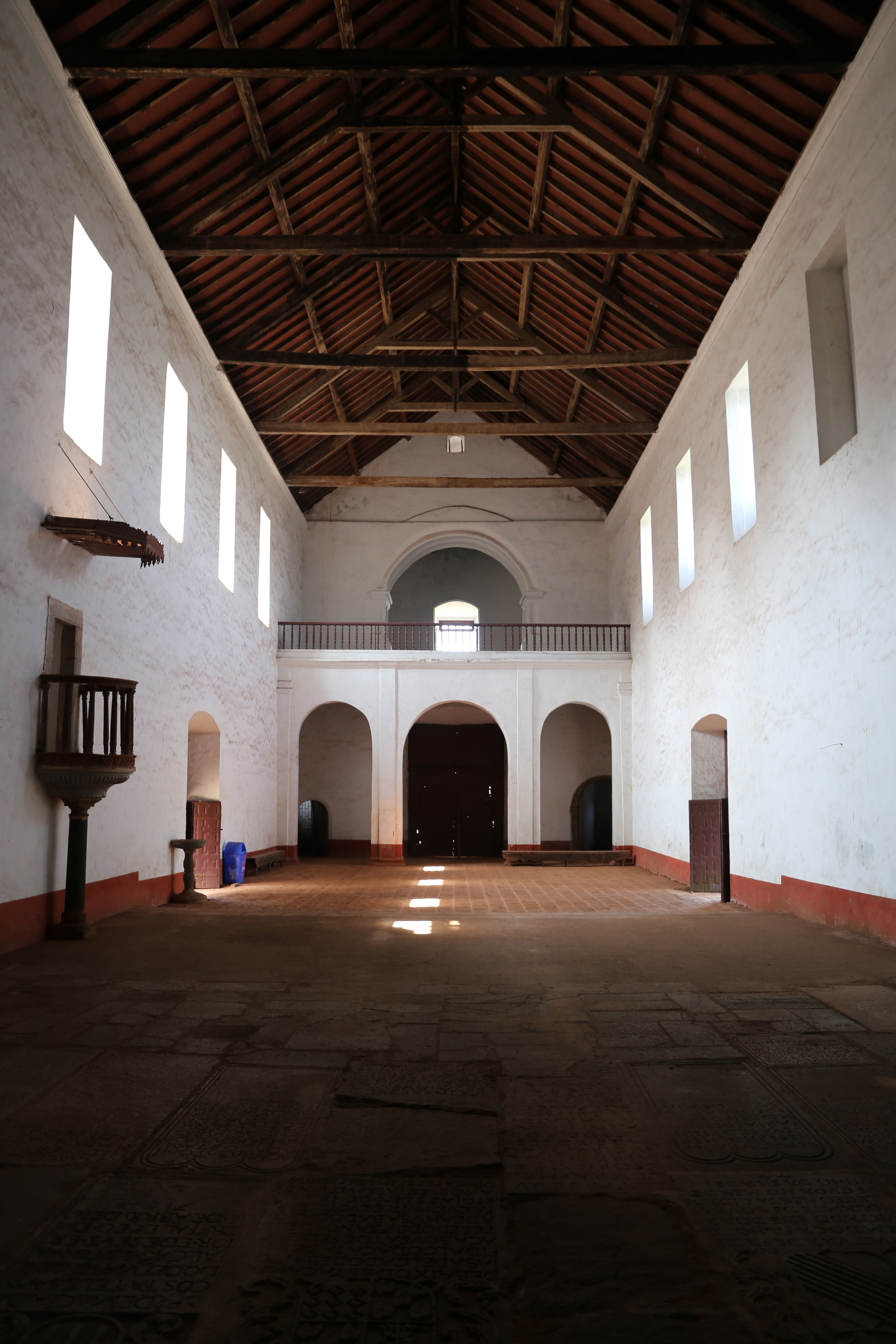
Entrance, view from the Main Altar.

The church of Our Lady of the Rosary is considered to be one of the oldest preserved buildings in Old Goa. Also, it is the only building that still has a (mainly) Renaissance construction and architectural elements. Gothic style and Manueline style are present in the exterior and interior. The church is an early testimony of the Christianization of Goa. Since it was located far outside the city centre, it was not subjected to any modernization. Other buildings from the same time period were eventually massively overbuilt and reshaped.

The facade of the church has three floors and a two-storied portico flanked by cylindrical buttresses and cylindrical towers, each tower with cupolas crowned with crosses. The high windows, near the roof, give the impression of a fortress church with a cruciform plan. In addition, manual Indian designs are visible elements on the facade. Large cords are located at the cornice as well as the individual towers. The southern tower has a turning staircase to get to the upper choir on the second floor of the tower‑facade and the rood screen.

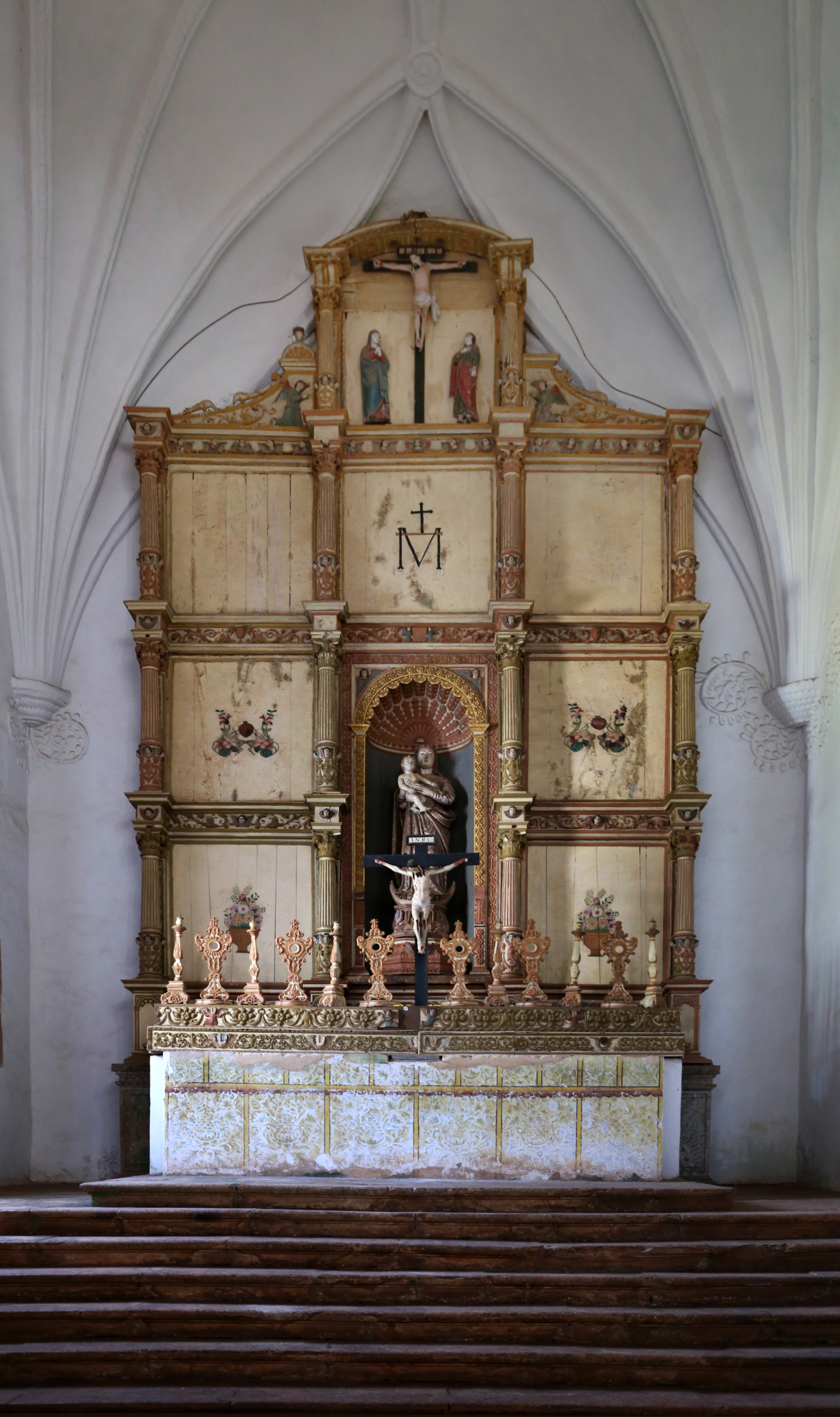
Main altar of the Church of Lady of Rosary.

The church's baptismal font is located on the ground floor of the northern tower. On the highest floor of the tower façade, there are light graceful columns in the corners, with window openings on all sides, and suspended bells.

=== Interior ===
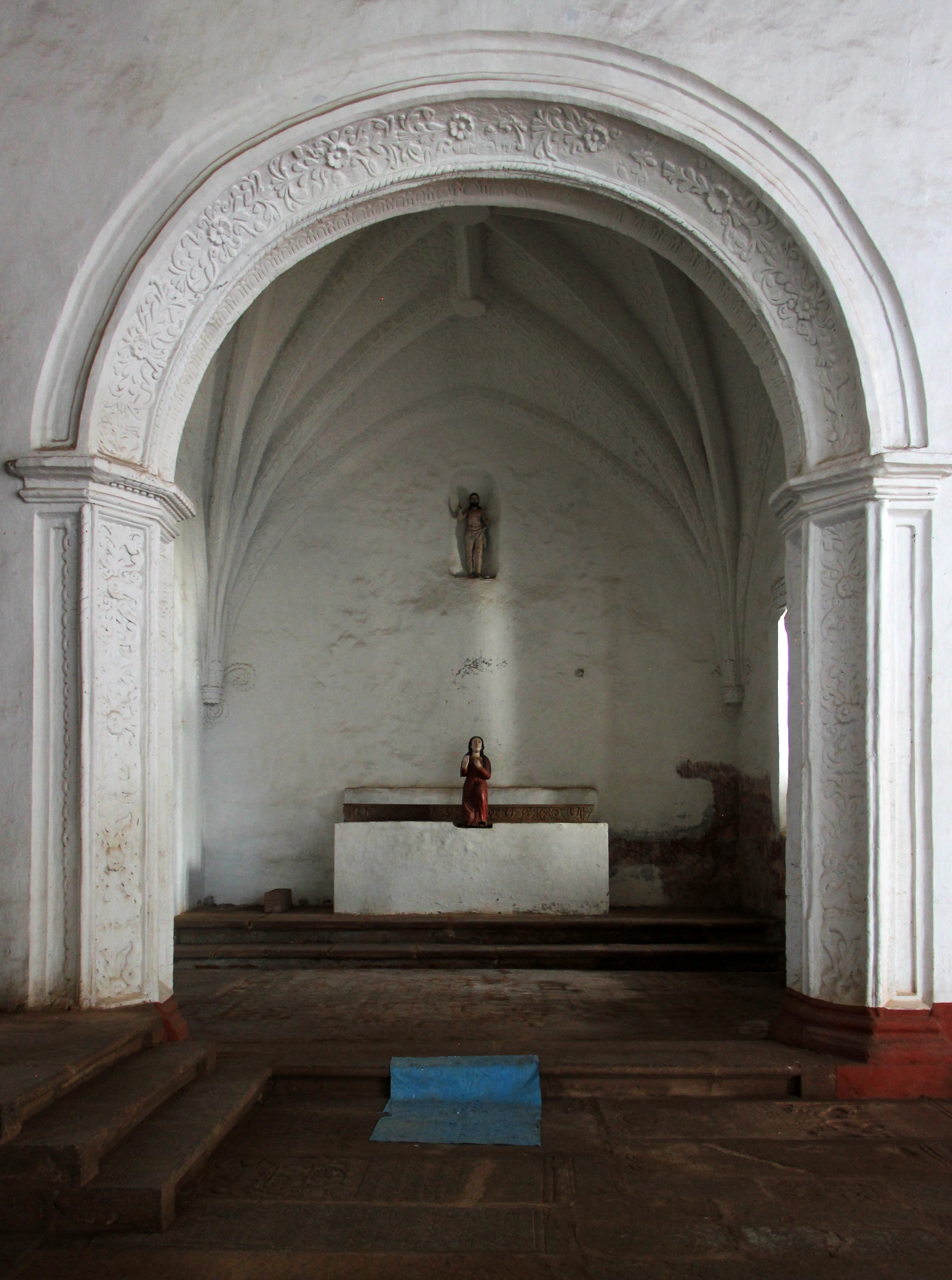
Altar of the Church of Lady of Rosary.

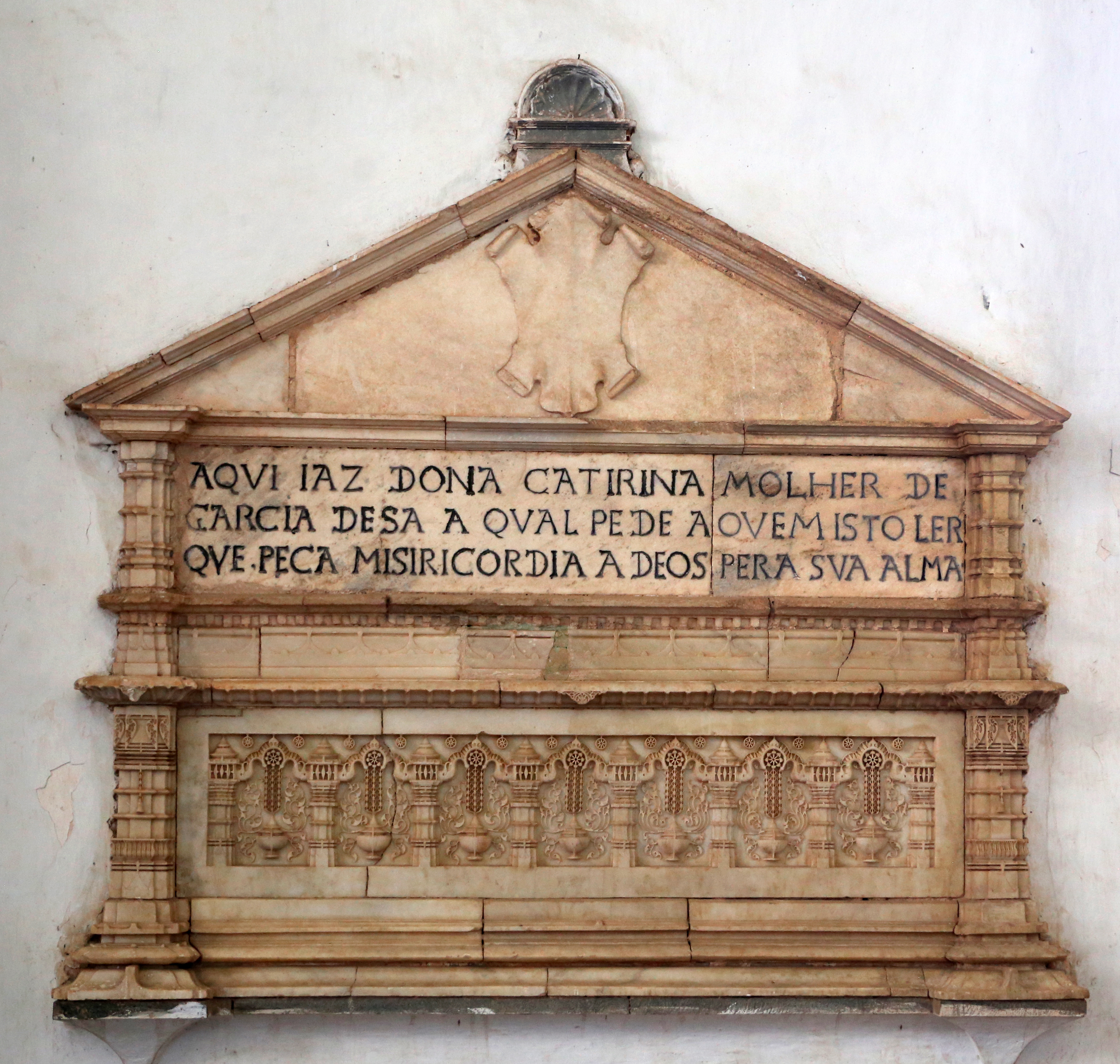
Tomb of Dona Catarina, wife of Garcia de Sá, a governor of Portuguese India (c. 16th century)

The church has two chapels and consists of only one nave with a main altar and two side altars. The main altar is dedicated to Our Lady of Rosary, with the influence of Gothic style seen in the rib vault of the Manueline style portico. The nave now has a partly open roof, after parts of the roof collapsed in 1897. The side chapels and the altar are arranged by a leaf-vein vault in the shape of a star.

While the vault of the apse corresponds to the Gothic style, the main room of the church is largely Manueline style. There is a tombstone of a Portuguese woman in the apse with the inscription: Aqui jaz Dona Catarina, mulher de Garcia de Sá, a qual pede a quem isto ler que peça misericórida a Deus para sua alma (Here lies Dona Catarina, wife of Garcia de Sá, who asks whoever reads this to request God to have mercy on her soul). Below the apse is the tomb of her husband Garcia de Sá (died in June 1549), a Governor of Portuguese India.

== The church as a World Heritage Site in India ==
UNESCO declared the church a World Heritage site in 1986, part of the Churches and convents of Goa set of sites. In the Portuguese monument database of the Sistema de Informação para o Património Arquitectónico, which also includes monuments of the former Portuguese colonies, this church has registration number 11444. In the database of the Archaeological Survey of India, it is registered with the number N-GA-6.
