= Surla, North Goa =

Village in Goa, India

Coordinates: 15.490°N 74.044°E

Surla is a village in the Bicholim taluka (sub-district) of Goa, India, situated 27 km (17 mi) from the state capital at Panaji. It is bordered by Ponda taluka in its south, by the rest of Bicholim taluka on its west, by Tiswadi taluka to part of its west, and by another village of Bicholim taluka, Navelim towards its northern side.

== Village statistics ==
Figures from the 2011 Census of India, say that the village had 836 residing families, a population of 3818 (comprising 1967 males and 1851 females). Children between 0–6 years make up 10.01 per cent (382) of the village population. Surla village's average sex ratio at 941 is less than that of Goa (973 females per thousand males). But the child sex ratio is 969, which is higher than the State average (942). Villager literacy is 89.14% as against 88.70% for the whole of Goa.

== Size ==
Surla is the fourth most-populous village in Bicholim taluka and it has a geographical area of 17 square kilometres, making it the third-largest village in the taluka. Its population density is 225 persons per square kilometre.

== Mining issue ==
In April 2014, the Goa Bench of the Bombay High Court decided a case which had been filed by the Village Panchayat of Surla and Others v. the State of Goa through its Chief Secretary and Others over the mining issue in the area. This petition was filed in public interest to take up the cause of farmers of Surla village affected by mining activities. The court noted that 761 farmers had been affected and damages suffered by them.

In December 2015, a truck was burnt at Surla, where agitating truckers had gathered and blocked trucks carrying ore.

== Cement plant ==
The Alcon Cement Company (Anil Couto group) has its cement plant situated at the Surla village. It is about 15 km from the Ponda–Panaji highway (NH-4A) and about 11 km from the Sanquelim–Valpoi State highway. On the east, the plant is bounded by the Navelim–Surla–Usagao road. The Mandovi River flows along the west boundary of the plant. Dempo's Benefication Plant adjoins the plant on the north and to the south there is vacant land.

== Local officials ==
According to the official Government of Goa site, the local Surla village panchayat officials are: panchayat sarpanch Suryakant Vishnu Gawade, of Ghadiwada, Agodye, Surla mobile 9823647637; deputy sarpanch Suhasini Subhash Fondekar, 732, JoshiBhat, Surla mobile 9545261410; and panchayat secretary Prajanand Naik Borkar (holding additional charge) 9922772607. The date is not clear.
