= Convent of Our Lady of Grace, City of Goa =

Church of St. Augustine
- Church of Nossa Senhora da Graca
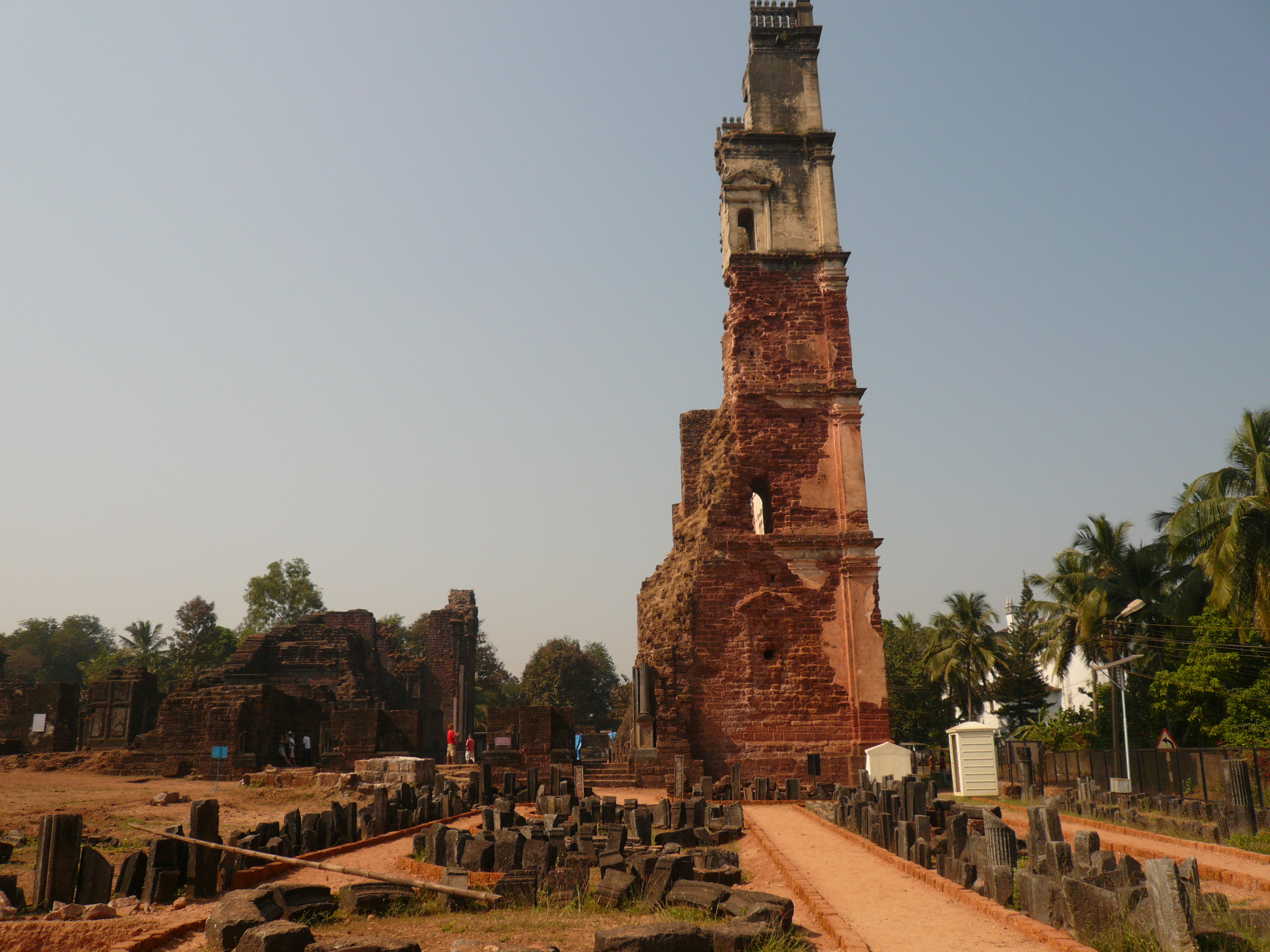
- The complex and the imposing tower

- Location on a map of India
- 15°30′01.5″N 73°54′23.8″E
- Country: India

History
- Status: Church
- Founded: 1597; 429 years ago

Architecture
- Functional status: Ruins
- Completed: 1602; 424 years ago
- Closed: 1938; 88 years ago

Church and Convent of Our Lady of Grace (Portuguese: Igreja e Convento de Nossa Senhora de Graca) was the principle Augustinian house in Asia on Monte Santo at the City of Goa, and one of the largest religious complexes in Asia. The church was completed in 1602 and is part of the World Heritage Site, Churches and convents of Goa.

== History ==
The church was built on top of the Monte Santo (Holy Hill), between 1597 and 1602 by Augustinian friars who landed in Goa in 1587. The church was considered one of the three great Augustinian churches in the Iberian world along with El Escorial and the Monastery of São Vicente de Fora.

The church was abandoned in 1835 after the Portuguese government of Goa began evicting many religious orders in Goa under its new repressive policies. The subsequent neglect caused the vault of the church to collapse in 1842. The body collapsed soon after and by 1871, the bell was moved from the tower to Our Lady of the Immaculate Conception Church in Panjim, where it remains to date. In 1931, the facade of the church and half the tower collapsed and by 1938, most of the other parts had also collapsed. Currently only half the tower remains, and it is one of the most visited tourist destinations in Goa. The ruins were featured in the song Gumnaam Hai Koi from the 1965 suspense thriller movie Gumnaam and 'Saathiya' from the Bollywood hit Singham.

== Structure ==
The church had four towers of which only one remains. The remaining tower is a four-storied structure built of laterite and 46 m in height. Excavations show that the complex had eight chapels, four altars and a convent.

== Relics of St. Ketevan ==
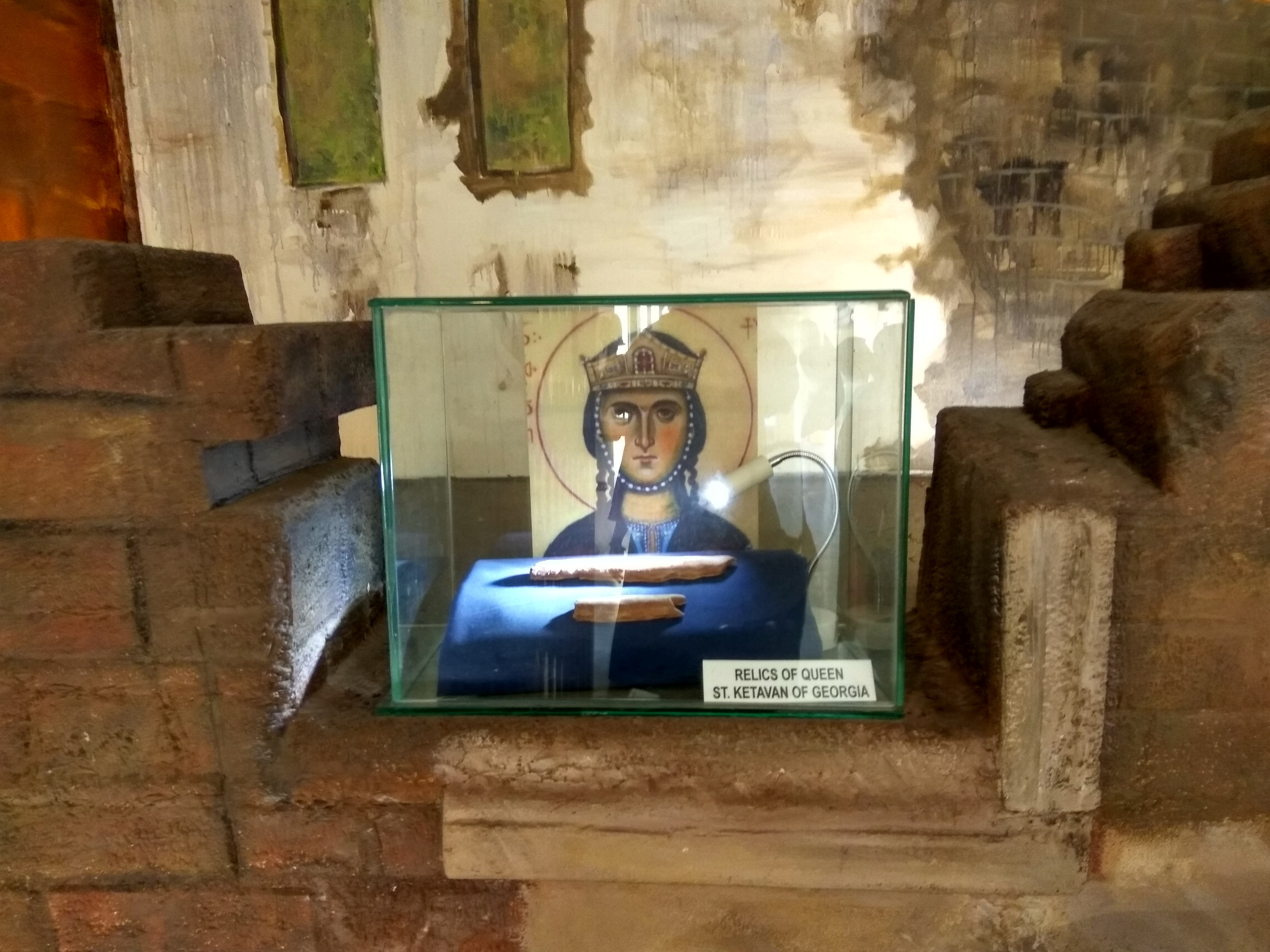
The relics on display in a nearby museum

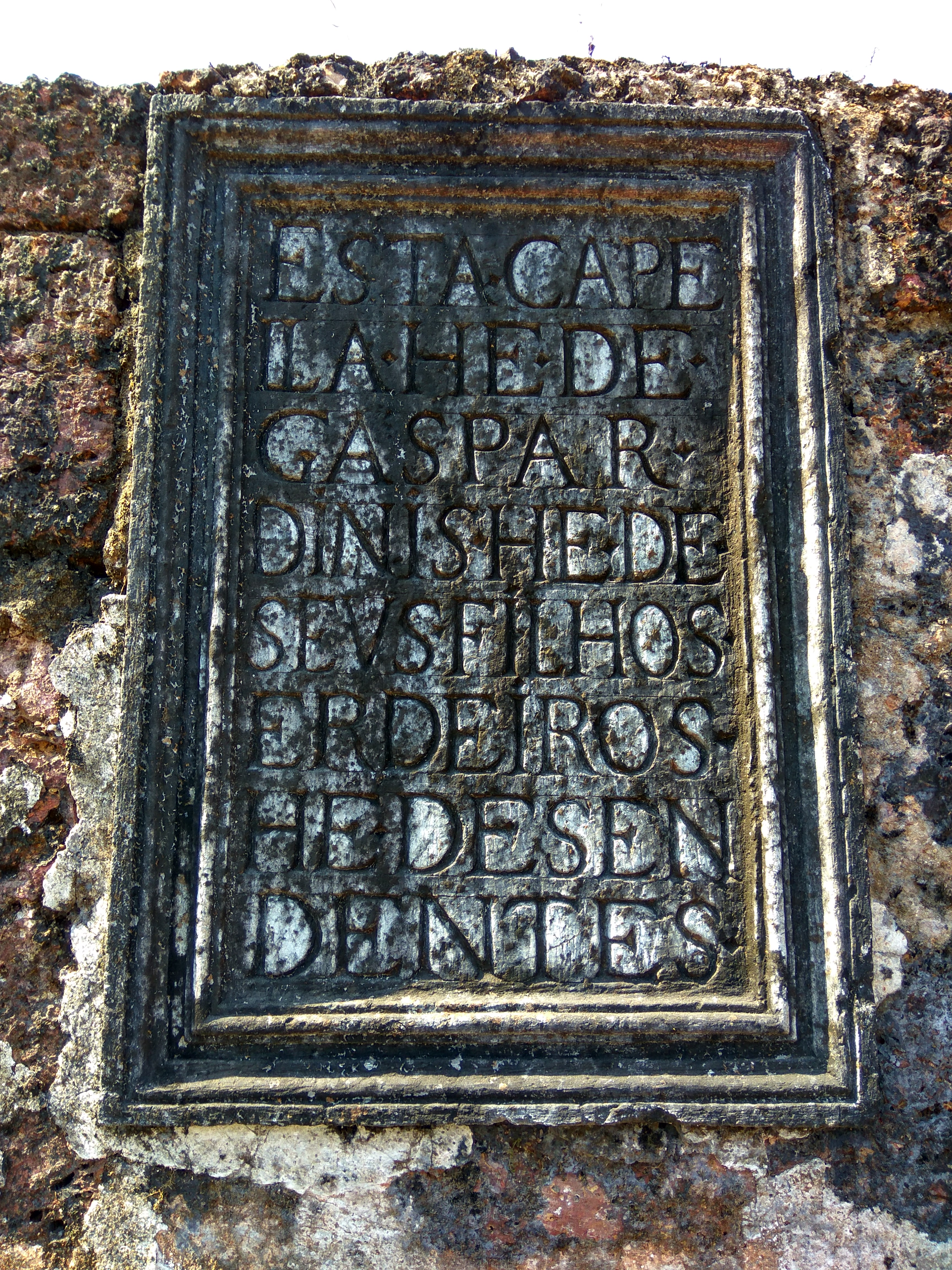
Inscription among the ruins

In the late 1980s, archaeologists from the Soviet Union and Georgia began efforts to trace the relics of Ketevan the Martyr, a Georgian queen who had delivered herself as a hostage to Shah Abbas I and was martyred on 13 September 1624 for refusing to deny her faith; the relics were believed to be in Goa. A Georgian team conducted excavations in the church, which were followed by independent efforts by the Archaeological Survey of India. The missions were looking for a black box which was supposed to contain the saint's bones, based on information collected by Professor António da Silva Rego in 1958 from Portuguese historical documents about their missions in the East.

A 2005 excavation project by the ASI, yielded bone fragments. The samples were tested at the Centre for Cellular and Molecular Biology to conduct DNA studies. The studies showed the presence of the U1b Human mitochondrial DNA haplogroup in the bones, which is absent in India, besides revealing that it belonged to a woman. Based on these findings and the historical material available, it was concluded that the bones most likely belonged to the Queen.

A multimedia board game about the excavation project, called The Travelling Hand was made by documentary filmmaker Gayatri Kodikal. The Ketevan World Sacred Music Festival has been held in the church complex since 2015.
