= Church and Convent of St. Francis of Assisi =

Church of St. Francis of Assisi
- Igreja de São Francisco de Assis
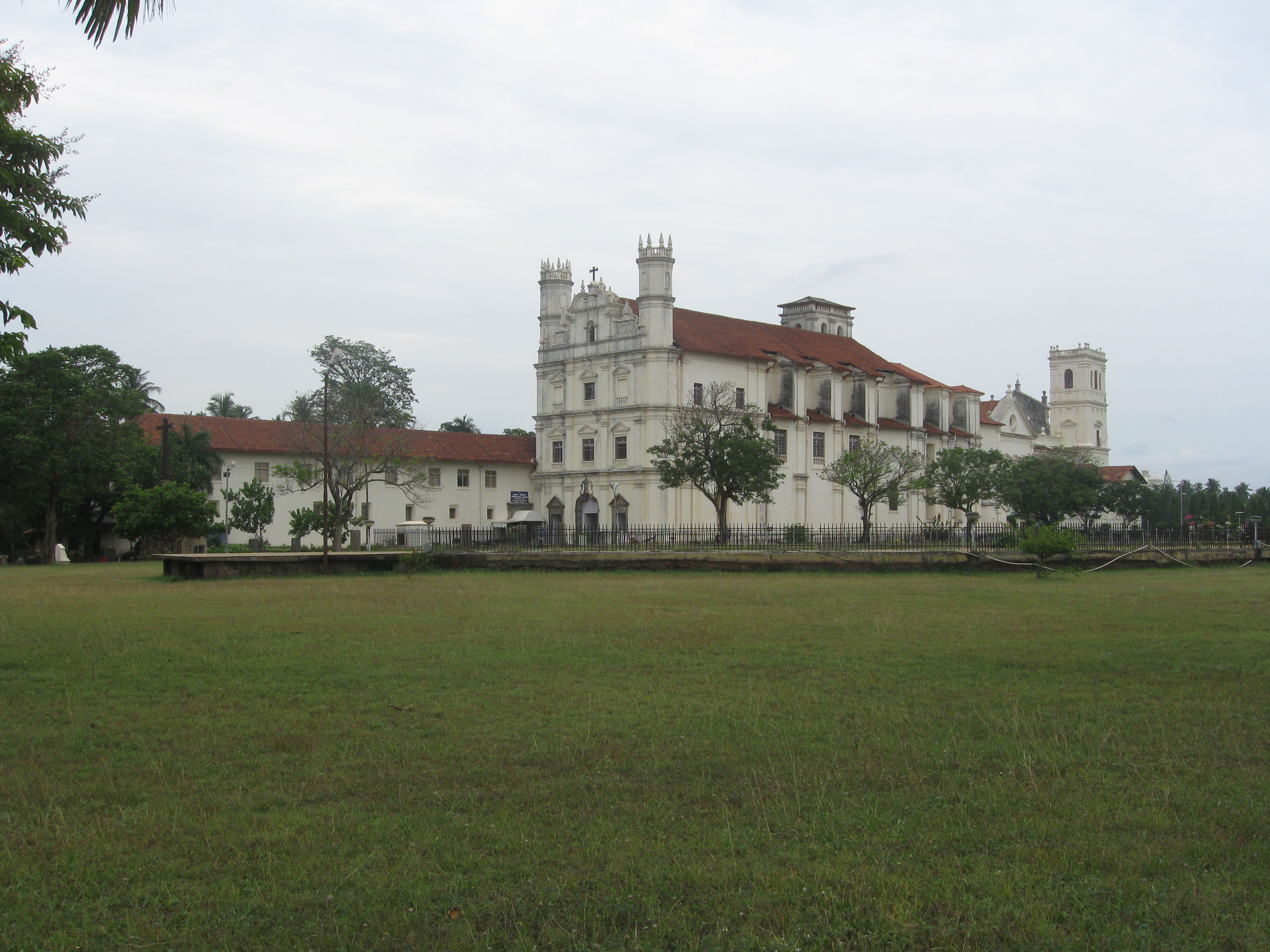
- Church of St. Francis of Assisi
- Church of St. Francis of Assisi
- 15°30′11.60″N 73°54′40.60″E
- Location: Velha Goa
- Country: India
- Denomination: Roman Catholic

History
- Founded: 1517; 509 years ago
- Founder: Franciscans

Architecture
- Functional status: Functional
- Completed: 1661

The Church of St. Francis of Assisi was built in 1661 by the Portuguese in the Portuguese Viceroyalty of India. The Church of St. Francis of Assisi, together with a convent, was established by eight Portuguese Franciscan friars who landed in Goa in 1517. It stands on the site of the principal mosque of the Adil Shahi city, later demolished. It is part of the UNESCO World Heritage Site, Churches and convents of Goa.

== The structure ==
The following is the information as seen on the plaque beside the Church of St. Francis of Assisi.

The three tier facade have octagonal towers on each side and in the central niche there is a statue of St. Michael. The main entrance is decorated with circular pilasters and rosette band. The central nave is barrel-vaulted while the crossing is rib-vaulted which supports the choir. The internal buttress walls, separating the chapels and supporting the gallery on top, have frescoes showing floral designs.

Above the tabernacle in the main altar is a large statue of St. Francis of Assisi and Jesus on the cross, statues of St. Peter and St. Paul are seen below. The adjoining walls of nave retain painted panels depicting scenes from the life of St Francis of Assisi."
