= Jacome Gonsalves =

Oratorian priest and missionary (1676–1742)

The Reverend Jacome Gonsalves C.O.
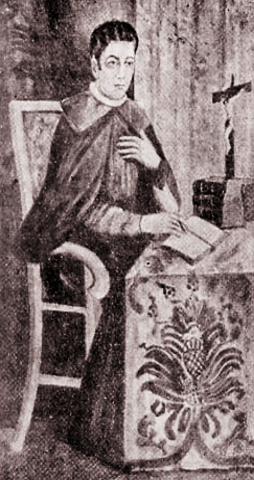
- Father of Catholic Literature in Sri Lanka

Priest and missionary
- Born: 8 June 1676; Divar, Goa, Portuguese India, Portuguese Empire
- Died: 17 July 1742; Our Lady of Assumption church, Bolawatta, Negombo, Sri Lanka
- Honored in: Roman Catholic Church (Sri Lanka and the Congregation of the Oratory)
- Patronage: Sri Lanka

Jacome Gonsalves, CO (Devanagari Konkani: पाद्री झाकॉम गोनसाल्विश; Portuguese: Padre Jacome Gonçalves; Tamil: ஜாகோமே கொன்சால்வேஸ் அருட்தந்தை; Sinhala: ජාකොමේ ගොන්සාල්වෙස් පියතුමා Jakome Gonsalves Piyathuma) was an Oratorian priest and missionary in Sri Lanka, then known as Ceylon.

Gonsalves arrived in Ceylon during the Dutch occupation, when the Dutch were imposing Calvinism as the official religion after defeating the Portuguese. He also helped Joseph Vaz in missionary work. He was proficient in the local Sinhala and Tamil Languages.

He is known as the "Father of Catholic Literature in Sri Lanka" because of his tremendous literary output. He had written many books, prayers, hymns and translated many Latin hymns into local languages. Some of his hymns and prayers are in popular use even today among Sinhala and Tamil Catholics.

== Life ==
=== Birth ===
Jacome Gonsalves was the eldest son of Tomás Gonsalves and Mariana de Abreu, a Goan Catholic couple living in the parish of Our Lady of Piety (Piedade, Goa). He was born on 8 June 1676. He was a Konkani Brahmin by lineage. His family had been Catholic for many generations, being among the first native converts at the beginning of Portuguese rule in Goa.

=== Education ===
Gonsalves studied at the Jesuit College of Goa. He enrolled in the University of Goa [probably Saint Paul's College, Goa], and obtained the degree of Bachelor of Arts. In 1696 he began theological studies at the Academy of St Thomas Aquinas in Goa, where he also held the post of organist. This seems to have led him to develop a taste for poetry, prose and music.

=== Ordination ===
He was ordained to the priesthood by Rt. Rev. Agostinho de Anunciação, Archbishop of Goa, in April 1700 at the Cathedral of St. Catherine. He decided to enter the Oratorian Congregation of Goa. He was appointed to the chair of philosophy at the University of St Paul's in Goa [probably the Collegio São Paulo]. He took up his post in January 1705, but relinquished it the same year to go to Sri Lanka.

=== At Sri Lanka ===
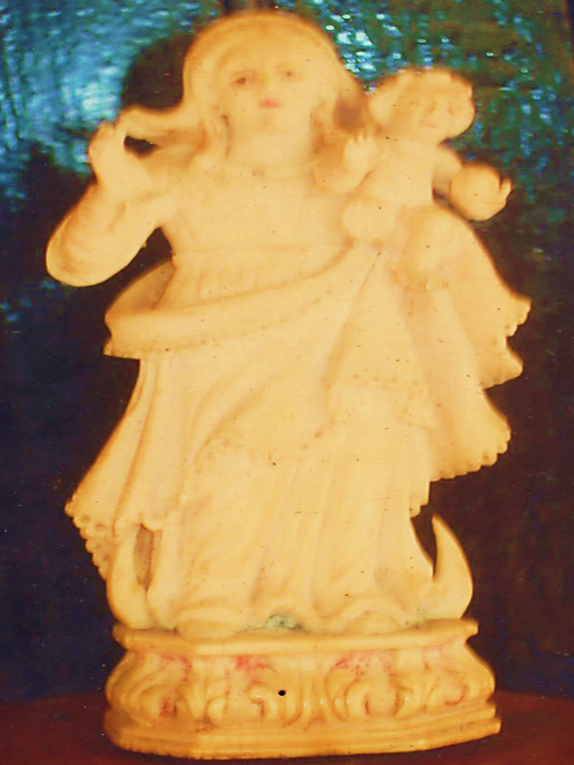
An ivory statue of Mary, Presented to Fr. Jacome by the King

He left Goa on 9 May 1705 and reached Sri Lanka on 30 August 1705, arriving at Talaimannar. At the time, he knew Konkani, Portuguese, Latin and Spanish. During the long journey he studied Tamil. He mastered this language during his first assignment on the islands of Mannar, Arippu, Musali and other places in the Munnar district. He also learnt Dutch. Fr Joseph Vaz sent him to Kandy to learn Sinhala. Fr Gonsalves studied with the Buddhist monks at the Malwatta chapter, known for their high and elegant Sinhala.

Then after, he conducted his services in areas around Negombo, Colombo, and Kalutara from February, 1709. In the same year, he converted more than 1300 to Catholicism. First months of 1710, he stayed at Kandy. While he was servicing between Sitawaka and Colombo, he was tortured by Dutch, who were controlling the coastline of Sri Lanka. Because of the extreme illness of Fr. Joseph Vaz, he came back to Kandy. There he gave him extreme unction and did his funeral.

Due to the dislocating of his temporomandibular joint in 1711, he went to the royal doctors, then to Puttlam, Sitawaka, and Colombo. Thereafter he stayed at Kandy till 1713. He built a church near Palace of Hanguranketa. And then he went to service in Negombo and Colombo. He was appointed as the Sub Chief of Bishop of Cochin and as the chief of the all Oratorians in Sri Lanka. He serviced in the Northern areas till 1725. Thereafter he serviced in Colombo and nearby areas. He serviced as a peacemaker of King in 1726. He also took place in stopping a revolt that was going to be in 1729.

Though the chiefs of Congregation of Oratory (Goa) asked him to return to Goa, through Bishop of Cochin, Fr Jacome Gonsalves rejected the appeal, thinking of his service at Sri Lanka. He wrote many of his works at Bolawatta, near Negombo. Since there was no printing press, he employed 12 Sinhala clerks to copy his works. Fr Jacome Gonsalves has been called: "the most successful missionary that this island (Sri Lanka) ever had, the creator of Catholic literature in Ceylon, whose name is still held in benediction and whose literary works in Sinhalese and Tamil are still in daily use in the church of this island."

== Works ==
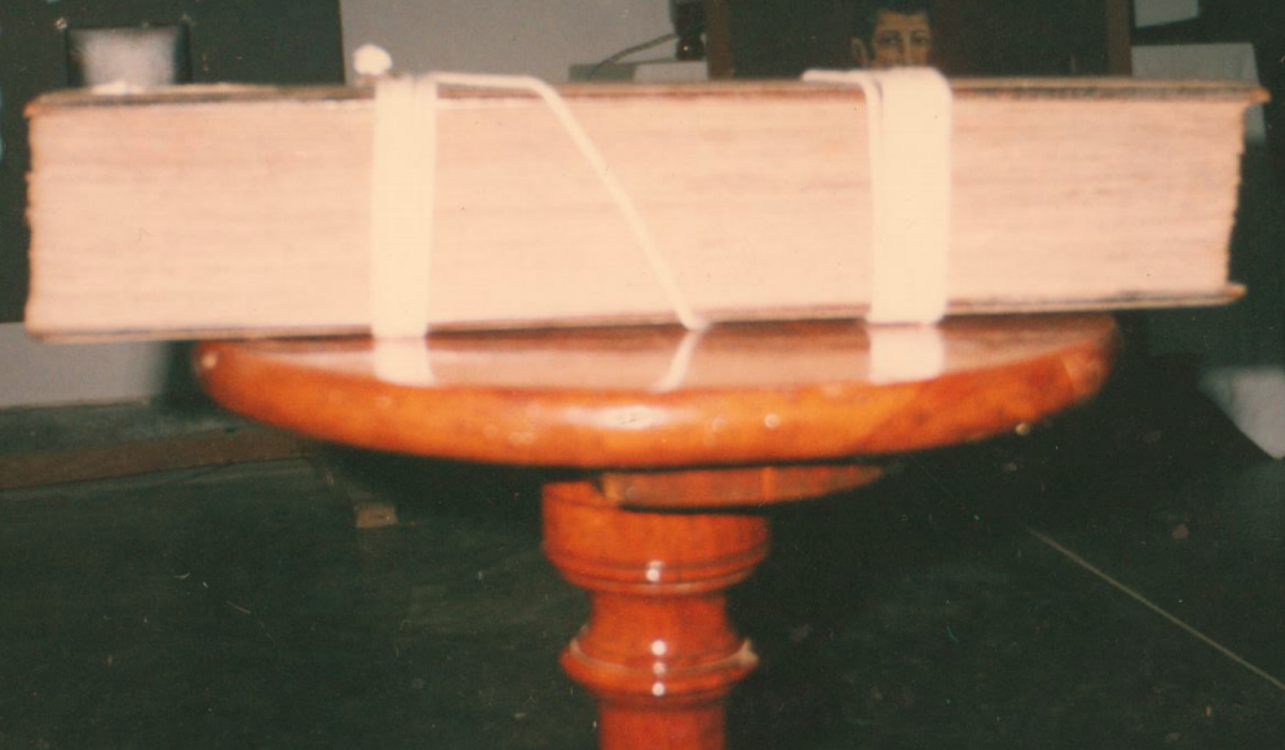
The original book of Deva Vedha Puranaya, written on Ola leaves, at Ampitiya Seminary

=== Books ===
Fr. Jacome Gonsalvez is known as the "Father of Catholic Literature of Sri Lanka". That is because of the service he had done to the Catholic Church in Sri Lanka from his books. He has written 42 books including 22 in Sinhala, 14 in Tamil, 5 in Portuguese, and 1 in Dutch.

==== Deva Vedha Puranaya (දේව වේද පුරාණය) ====
දේව වේද පුරාණය (Deva Veda Puranaya = Divine History) is a compendium of the Bible in 2 parts, including 28 chapters under පුරාණ දේව වාක්‍ය (Purana Deva Wakya = Old Testament) and 2 chapters under අභිනව දේව වාක්‍ය (Abhinava Deva Wakya = New Teastament). With a content of 400 printed pages, this was the largest book that was written in Kandyan Era. This has been influenced by Thomas Stephens' Khristapurana. This is the greatest book written by Fr. Jacome Gonsalvez. This has been written as the whole creation of world has been done in Sri Lanka, with usage of creative illusions and allusions. His description of the Garden of Eden includes local trees: jackfruit, sugar cane, king coconut, timbiri, sandalwood, blue lotus.

==== Deva Vedha Sankshapaya (දේව වේද සංක්ෂපය) ====
දේව වේද සංක්ෂපය (Deva Veda Sankshapaya = Summary of Divine History) is a summary of Deva Veda Puranaya written in 1713. This has been written as a questionnaire.

Suvishesha Visheshanaya (සුවිශේෂ විසර්ජනය)

සුවිශේෂ විසර්ජනය (Suvishesha Visarjanaya = Gospel Resolution) is a book written in 1730. It consists of gospels read on Sundays, debt festivals and feasts of important saints, and sermons on those days.

==== Dukprapthi Prasangaya (දුක්ප්‍රාප්ති ප්‍රසංගය) ====
දුක්ප්‍රාප්ති ප්‍රසංගය (Dukpraprthi Prasangaya = Sermon of torture) is a book written in 1728, on torture of Jesus. It has 9 sermons which are divided among 7 weeks including 6 weeks of Lent and Holy Week. This has done a great job to the liturgy in Lent. Here ප්‍රසංගය (prasangaya = show) has come from Tamil word பிரசங்கம் (pirasangam) which means sermon. So it means Sermon of Torture. In early years, this was used as the script for Easter plays.

==== Dharmodyanaya (ධර්මෝද්‍යානය) ====
ධර්මෝද්‍යානය (Dharmodyanaya) is a book written on biographies of Saints. This has been written in 1735.

==== Prathiharyawaliya (ප්‍රාතිහාර්යාවලිය) ====
ප්‍රාතිහාර්යාවලිය (Prathiharyawaliya) is a book written on some of the miracles done by Jesus which are mentioned in Holy Bible, in 1732.

==== Sukurtha Darpanaya (සුකෘත දර්පණය) ====
සුකෘත දර්පණය (Sukurtha Darpanaya) is a book written in between 1733 - 1740, to invite to a life of faith, and to show the value of a Christian life of faith.

==== Deva Neethi Visarjanaya (දේව නීති විසර්ජනය) ====
දේව නීති විසර්ජනය (Deva Neethi Visarjanaya = Resolution of divine laws) is a book written in between 1720 - 1730, on the last judgement of God.

==== Veda Kavya (වේද කාව්‍ය) ====
වේද කාව්‍ය (Veda Kavya) Veda Kavyaya is a poetic composition, composed in 1725. It covers the history of the world from the creation to ascension of Christ into heaven.

==== Agnana Aushadhaya (අඥාන ඖෂධය) ====
අඥාන ඖෂධය (Agnana Aushadhaya = Medicine for fools) is book written as a medicine for the expels. Many have converted into Roman Catholic after reading this. It has been written in dialogues.

==== Deshana Navaye Pasam Potha (දේශනා නවයේ පසම් පොත) ====
දේශනා නවයේ පසම් පොත (Deshana Navaye Pasam Potha = Pasam book of nine sermons) is the Dukprapthi Prasangaya, written as poems. 9 sermons are written in 9 chapters, with about 20–30 poems per each. And the 7th sermon includes 76 poems and 8th sermon includes 85 poems. In total there are 357 poems. This has been written in between 1712 - 1743, to get rid of the uniformity in Dukprapthi Prasangaya.

==== Kristhiyani Palliya (ක්‍රිස්තියානි පල්ලිය) ====
ක්‍රිස්තියානි පල්ලිය (Kristiyani Palliya = Christian Church) is a book of prayers written for the day to day usage of Catholics. It contains prayers for healing of humans as well as animals, prayers to protect the agriculture from pests, and prayers for saints. It has been written in between 1715–1730.

==== Mathara Prathyakshaya (මාතර ප්‍රත්‍යක්ෂය) ====
මාතර ප්‍රත්‍යක්ෂය (Mathara Prathyakshaya = Manifest of Matara) is a book written rejecting the teachings of Buddhism, and giving a correct idea, in 1733.

==== Mangala Geethaya (මංගල ගීතය) ====
මංගල ගීතය (Mangala Geethaya = Festival song) is a book containing hymns to Jesus, Mary and Saints in 1730. This was used for liturgical purposes.

==== Ananda Kalippuwa (ආනන්ද කලිප්පුව) ====
ආනන්ද කලිප්පුව (Ananda Kalippuwa) is a song book written in 1728. It is the first song book ever written in Sri Lanka. It contained the songs which told about the frivolousness of the life. This is venerated as a great book containing songs. It contained some songs which denounced the corruptions in the king's palace and council farcically.

==== Budu Mula (බුදු මුල) ====
බුදු මුල (Budu Mula = Roots of buddhism) is a book written in 1737, showing the weak points of Buddhism, and to show the right way to the people at palace.

==== Gnanangjanaya (ඥානාංජනය) ====
ඥානාංජනය (Gnanangjanaya = Knowledge the medicine to eye) is a book written in 1738. It contains 12 meditations (Religious sermons) to refresh, lighten the spiritual vision of Catholics. These meditations are written to be said on retreats. It shows the value and objective of humanity, what is sin, how to get rid of sin and the results of sin.

==== Dictionaries ====
- සිංහල - ප්‍රතිකාල් අකාරාදිය (Sinhala Prathikaal Akaaradiya = Sinhala Portuguese Dictionary) 1730
- ප්‍රතිකාල් - සිංහල අකාරාදිය (Prathikaal Sinhala Akaaradiya = Portuguese Sinhala Dictionary) 1720
- ප්‍රතිකාල් - දෙමළ - සිංහල අකාරාදිය (Prathikaal Demala Sinhala Akaaradiya = Portuguese Tamil Sinhala Dictionary) 1735

==== Other Books (Sinhala) ====
- සත්‍ය උපදේශ (Sathya Upadesha)

==== Tamil Books ====
- சட்டிய வேதாகம சம்க்ஷேபம் (Sattiya Vedagama Samshepam)
- கிறிஸ்டியானி ஆலயம் (Kiristiyani Aalayam) - The oldest prayer book in Tamil in Sri Lanka
- வியாகுல பிரசங்கம் (Viyakula Pirasangam) - Tamil version of Dukprapthi Prasangaya
- சுவிசேஷ விரித்துறை (Suvisesha Viriththurai) - Tamil version of Suvishesha Visarjanaya

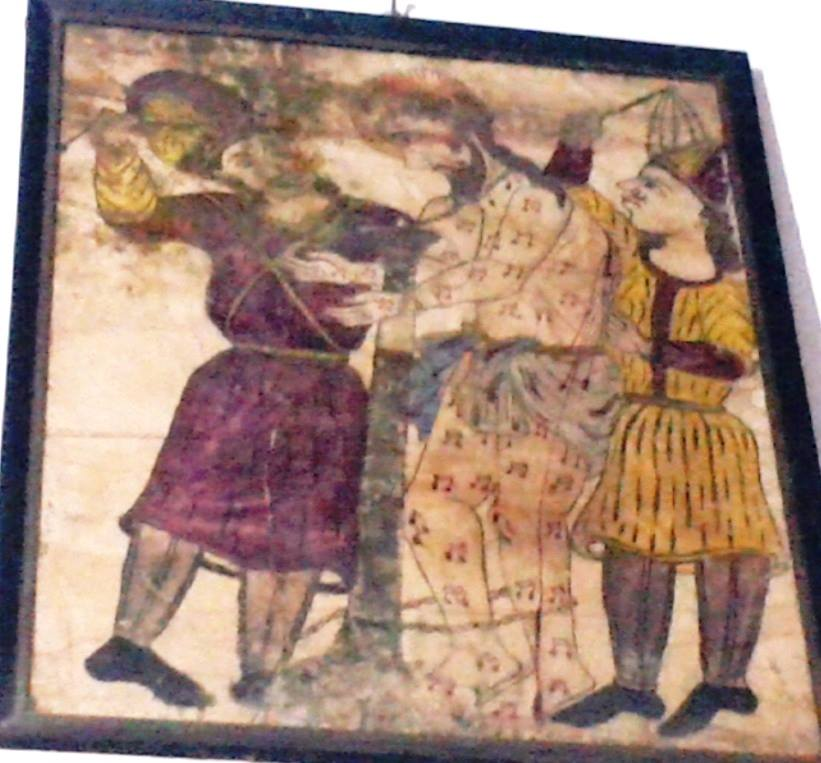
Painting of the 2nd station of way of cross, by Fr. Jacome Gonsalves

=== Hymns ===
Fr. Jacome Gonsalves wrote and translated many hymns during his lifetime. Many of those are still in common use in the Roman Catholic Church. Those did a massive service to the Catholic Literature in Sri Lanka.

He introduced a new variety of hymns, or lamentations called Pasan (පසම් / ஒப்பாரி), which are still being sung in the lent times. And Sinhala Christmas Carols were introduced by him. Some of very popular hymns written by him are as follows:

- දෙවිදු උපන්නේය සතුනි (Devidu Upanneya = Jesus was born)
- ත්‍රී එක සුර ජේසුනේ (Three Eka Sura Jesune)
- ආරම්බෙන් පෙර (Aaramben Pera = Before the beginning)

=== Paintings ===
Fr. Jacome Gonsalves has also done a number of paintings on the Stations of the Cross. These paintings are now found at the church of Our Lady of Assumption, Bolawatta.

=== Prayers ===
Many prayers have also been made and translated by him. Still these are one of the most being used prayers till these days. Some of the prayers made or translated by him are as follows:

- නමෝ මරියනි (Namo Mariyani = Hail Mary)
- ස්වාමිවාක් ආරාධනාව (Swamiwak Aradanawa = Lord's Prayer)
- කයදුෂ්කාර ප්‍රාර්ථනාව (Kayadushkaara Praarthanaawa)

== Death ==
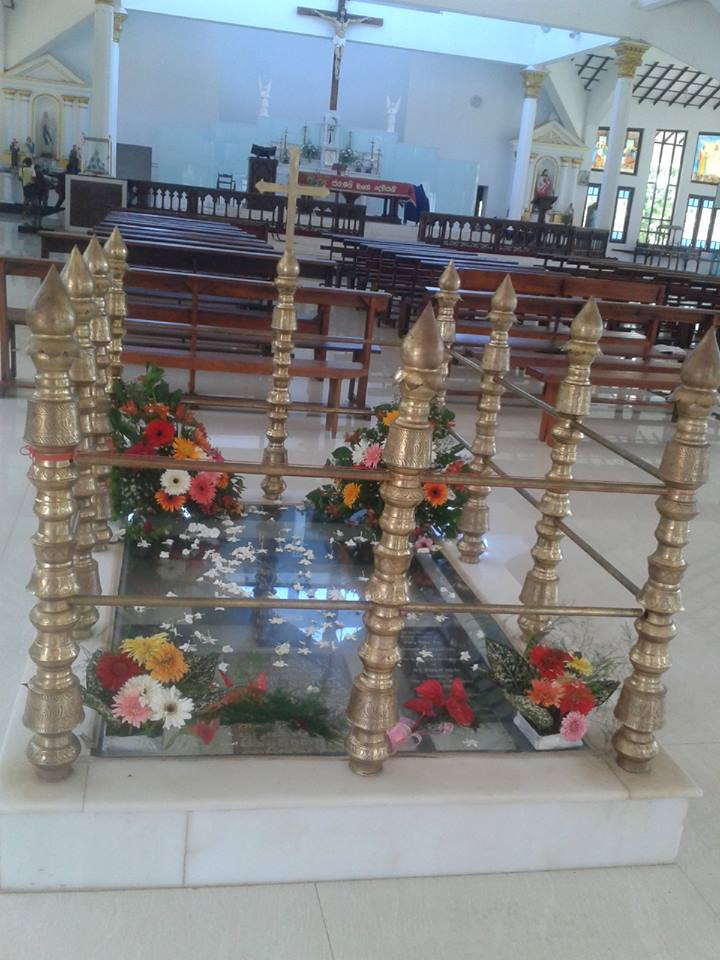
Tomb of Fr. Jacome Gonsalves at Bolawatta Church

Fr. Jacome Gonsalves came to Bolawatta church in 1740. There he wrote and published many books. He chose there as the meeting place of the all missionaries who were in Sri Lanka. He died on 17 July 1742, at an age of 66. He was buried in the Church of Our Lady of Assumption, Bolawatta.

=== Reliquaries ===
His tomb was opened in 1852, by Fr. Florentine Gracia. Some of his bones were found there and a bone was kept in the altar of the new church. And then the tomb was sealed. When it was opened again, his cross and a tooth were taken out. The tooth has been kept in the church of Our Lady of Sorrows, Nainamadama. It is owned by Muthunamagonnage Niroshan Pranadu for generations.

== Secondary bibliography ==
- Fernandopulle, Anthony. Father Jacome Gonsalves: Sinhala Christian Literary Hero: A Study of the Sinhala Literary Works of Fr Jacome Gonsalves (1676–1742). Colombo: St Peter's College, 2000.
- Perera, S.G. The Life of Fr Jacome Gonsalves. Madura, 1942.
- Boudens, R. The Catholic Church in Ceylon under Dutch Rule. Rome, 1957.
- Peter, W.L.A. Don. Historical Gleanings. 1992.
- Peter, W.L.A. Don. Star in the East. 1995.
- Peiris, Edmond. Sinhalese Christian Literature of the XVII and XVIII centuries. 1943.
- Perniola, V. The Catholic Church in Sri Lanka: The Dutch Period. 1983.
- Vaz, J. Clement. Profiles of Eminent Goans, Past and Present. New Delhi: Concept Publishing, 1997.
