= Naroa, Ilhas, Goa =

Naroa
- Village
- Dome of the Capela de Nossa Senhora da Candelária

- Location within Goa Location within India
- Coordinates: 15.530976°N 73.923163°E
- Country: India
- State: Goa
- District: North Goa
- Taluka: Ilhas

Government in São Matias
  - Type: Panchayat
  - Sarpanch: seat vacant
- Elevation: 8 m (26 ft)

Population (2010)
  - Total: <1,000
- Demonym: Naroakor

Languages
  - Official: Konkani
  - Also Spoken (understood): English, Marathi, Hindi
  - Historical: Portuguese

Religions
  - Dominant: Christianity, Hinduism
  - Minor: Islam
  - Historical: Roman Catholicism
- Time zone: UTC+5:30 (IST)
- Postcode: 403403
- Telephone code: 0832
- Vehicle registration: none
- Website: goa.gov.in

Naroa is a village located on the eastern tip of the island of Divar, in the Indian state of Goa. It has a population of barely a thousand people, with about 80 houses.

The Island subsequently became the residence place of many dignified families of Goa. It also houses three parochial churches and possesses a chapel of two images of Christ held in great veneration by the Catholics of the place. The ruins of a fort are evident in the northern part of the village.

== History ==
It claimed its blessed status due to the confluence of three branches of the Mandovi that flowed by the village. The Hindus called this confluence the tirth (holy water), that washed away their sins after a dip in its waters. Naroa was also home to the Temple of Saptakoteshwar that was held in high reverence by the Hindu populace, not just the locals but from far and wide. Once a bustling place of pilgrimage, the village of Naroa now seems lost, its many secrets, on the verge of submerging into the waters of the Mandovi.

== Churches and chapels ==
=== Chapel of Our Lady of Candelaria ===
Chapel of Our Lady of Candelaria, Naroa, Ilhas and its altar

A prayer and catechism house was constructed in 1563, which was later transformed into a chapel. The chapel was erected the following year. The sanctuary of the chapel of Our Lady of Candelaria is round and topped by a dome, which is a unique character found in only two other chapels in Goa.

=== Fortress Chapel ===
The Jesuit priest Moren de Souza writes about the history of the Naroa church in his book Tisvaddecheo Igorzo (Churches of Tiswadi):

The Holy Spirit Chapel is actually dedicated to St. Thomas

"During routine inspection, one Portuguese commander found the fortress of Naroa practically empty. It seemed that being a Sunday, the entire garrison had gone to a neighbouring church for Sunday services. To solve this problem, the officials decided to construct a church there. Accordingly, the king of Portugal wrote a letter dated 8th March 1546 to Dom Joao de Castro and instructed him to build a church at Naroa and dedicate it to St. Thomas the Apostle. A document dated in the year 1710 reveals that Diogo da Silveira, captain of the fort of Naroa built this church. Though the church is dedicated to the Holy Spirit, a statue of St Thomas adorns the main altar."

=== Tarir's Riverside Cross ===
A cross, built right on the edge of the river Mandovi. This ward is called Tarir, where all the vodekar (boatmen) of the area reside. They would sing the litany of this cross by standing in their own canoes in the river. It was believed that if the cross ever got submerged, the water would enter their homes. So to protect them from this calamity they would conduct the litany.

== Naroa Fort ==
The peaceful ferry wharf that connects Illhas to Bicholim was once a hostile border between the Portuguese and the kingdom of Bijapur. Hence a fortress was erected to guard this entry point in the 17th century.

Situated in the Island of Divar, which is opposite the old city of Goa, Ilhas, the fort, was originally built by the Muslims. It was abandoned in 1834 and is now in ruins. Though the fortress is in ruins, an old garrison church adjacent to the fortress still serves the locals. Though the church is dedicated to the Holy Spirit, a statue of St Thomas adorns the main altar. The church contains many graves, perhaps of its gallant Captains who now sleep peacefully, as all hostilities are put to rest.

== Koti Tirth Tali ==
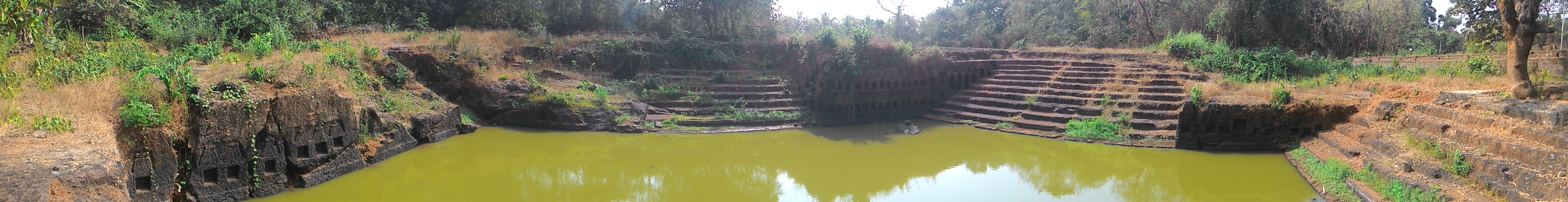
Panoramic view of the ancient well at Porne Tirth

An ancient well or bath is present in the village at Porne Tirth. It is known as Koti Tirth Tali. It has 108 carved small temples, the pond was of Shri. Saptkoteshwar.

== See also ==
- Divar
- Piedade, Goa
- São Matias, Goa
