= Saptakoteshwar Temple =

Hindu temple in Goa

Coordinates: 15.554°N 73.937°E

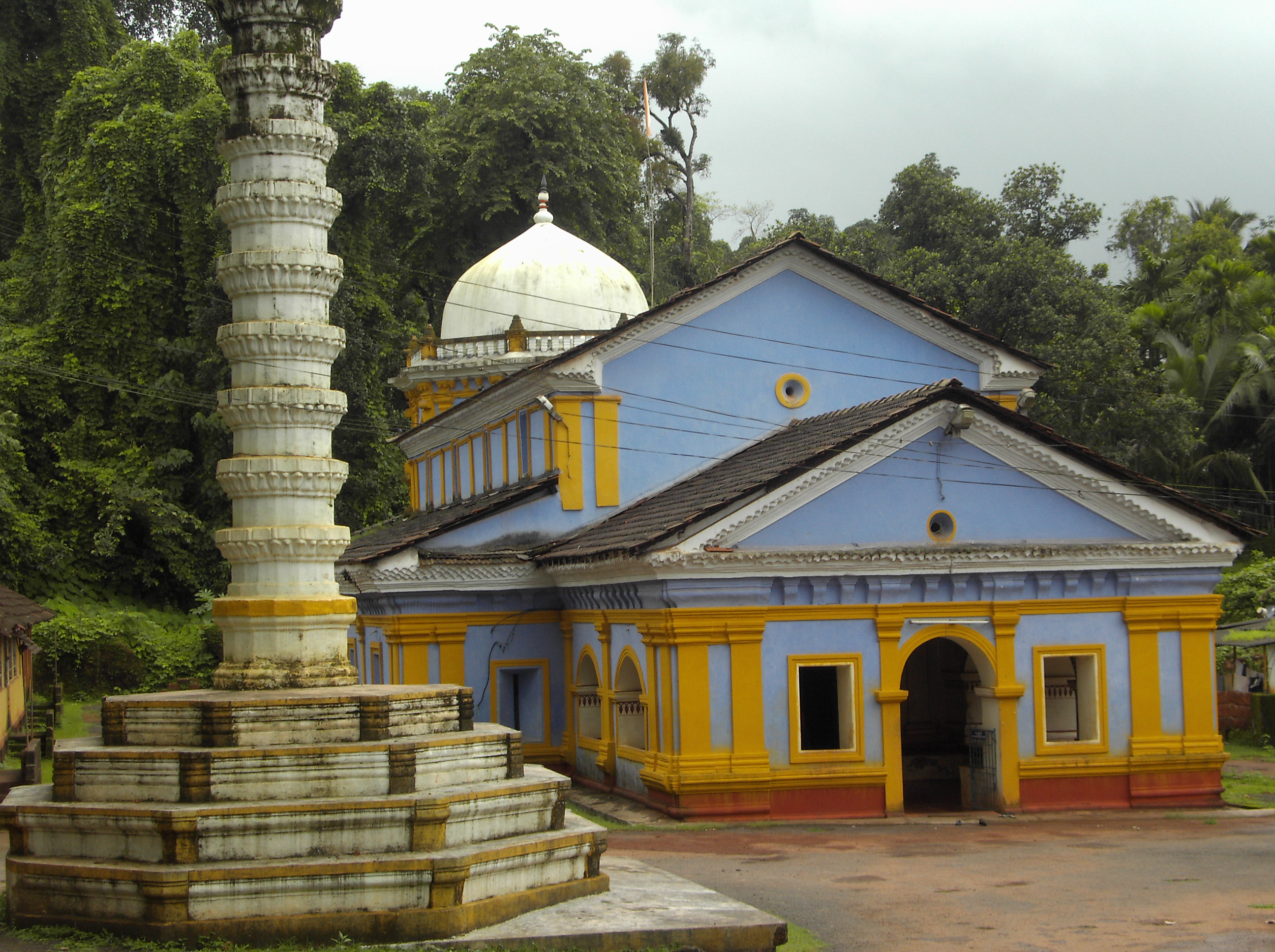
- Temple complex (at present).

Religion
- Affiliation: Hinduism
- District: North Goa
- Deity: Shiva
- Status: Active

Location
- State: Goa
- Country: India
- Interactive map of Saptakoteshwar Temple

Architecture
- Type: Kadamba

Saptakoteshwar Temple is a Hindu temple, dedicated to Lord shiva at Narve in Goa, India, is considered to be one of the six great sites of temples of Shiva in the Konkan area.

== History ==
=== Origin and legend ===
Saptakoteshwar, a form of Shiva, was the family god of the kings of the Kadamba dynasty.

According to the Sahyadri Khanda of the Skanda Purana, the shrine of Saptakoteshwar (also known as Sapta-natha) was established at Naroa on the island of Divar by the Saptarishi (seven sages). The legend states that one day, while the rishis were busy praying in the Rasatala, a subterranean region, a great serpent interrupted them. This forced them to go to the banks of the Panch Ganga (transl. five rivers) to praise Mahesvara. They then produced a Lingam of seven metals: gold, silver, lead, tin, iron and copper. This Lingam was established by them at Narvem on the island of Divar. Following seven karors of years of worship, Shiva appeared to the sages and agreed to remain at the site as Saptakoteshwar, the "Lord of the seven sages".

The temple was built by the King for his wife Kamaldevi who was a staunch devotee of this god. The Kadamba kings proudly used the title (Birudu) Shree Saptakotisha Ladbha Varaveera.

The gold coins discovered at Chandor, Goa (old name: Chandraura, Chandrapura), Gopikapatna and other places of the kings Jayakeshi I, Jayakeshi II, Jayakeshi III, Shivachitta Paramadideva, Soideva, etc., have inscriptions reading:

Saptakotishvaralabdha – Varaprasada

which means "with the grace of Lord Saptakotishwara", the family deity of Kadambas. These coins were often referred to as Saptakotisha-Gadyanakas.

=== Vijayanagara period ===
In 1352, when the Kadamba kingdom was conquered by the Bahmani Sultan Allauddin Hasan Gangu, Goa came under the rule of the Sultan for about 14 years. A number of temples were destroyed during this period and the linga (symbol of Lord Shiva) at the Saptakoteshwar temple was dug up by the troops.

In 1367, the army of Vijayanagar King Harihararaya defeated the Bahmani Sultan's troops in Goa and managed to restore most of the temples to their former glory including that of Saptakoteshwar. According to the records, the temple was reconstructed by Madhava Mantri by the end of the 14th century.

=== Portuguese destruction ===
Following the Portuguese conquest of Goa, the temple faced further destruction. Under Portuguese rule, specifically during the tenure of Dom Joao Nunes de Barreto, the temple on Divar Island was pulled down "stone by stone." This was in 1560 and a chapel dedicated to Nossa Senhora De Candelaria was erected in its place.

=== Rescue to Bicholim ===
Around this time, it is said the Hindu Chieftains from the neighbouring Bhatagram district, Narayan Shenvi Suryarao Sardesai, had a vision in their dream, where Lord Saptakoteshwar directed them to the Lingam and asked them to keep it safe. His vision soon became a reality when he found the Portuguese had, according to legend, placed the linga at the foot of a well, forcing those drawing water to step on it. A likelier version of the story states that it was instead used as part of a pulley to draw water; the rope marks are said to be visible.

Narayan Shenvi Suryarao Sardesai then gathered a small group of men who crossed the river to reach Naroa in the dead of night and steal the linga, taking it back to Latabarcem in Bhatagram, which later came under Bicholim taluka. The Portuguese then killed Narayan's brother. Two years later, the linga was transferred to Hindalem, the New Naroa. Narayan built a small temple here in 1549, placing the deity in an area of 8 square metres (86 sq ft) dug out of a rock cave.

=== Maratha reconstruction ===
The current structure of the temple was commissioned by the Maratha ruler Shivaji in 1668. Tradition states that Shivaji visited the shrine and, noting its dilapidated state, ordered its enlargement and embellishment at his own expense. The new temple houses a polished stone Linga approximately two feet high and sixteen inches in circumference.

=== Portuguese era restrictions ===
In 1654, Portuguese authorities issued orders prohibiting residents of Portuguese-controlled territory from visiting the tirtha at Saptakoteshwar. Despite these bans, the local population continued to visit the site to perform traditional rites and ceremonies.

During the Goa Inquisition, officials attempted to strictly enforce these bans, arguing that returning to the temple tank represented a reversion to older religious practices. However, the Viceroy countered some allegations from the archbishop by demonstrating that many ceremonies were actually taking place across the river, which was outside Portuguese jurisdiction at the time. To prevent such gatherings, the government maintained a heavy military presence along the frontier, utilizing an armed ship and annual bailiff inspections during major festivals.

== Architecture ==
With its shallow Moghul dome mounted on an octagonal drum sloping tiled roofs, European style Mandapa, or assembly hall and tall lamp tower or Deepastamba, the temple is situated in an archaeologically important area. The surroundings of the temple are tinged with several Brahminical laterite and stone caves. In the vicinity of it existed a Jain Math, the ruins of which are still visible. It was probably an important Jain temple patronised by the Kadamba rulers before they changed loyalty to Sri Saptakotishwar.

The complex contains the main temple and three smaller temples, which contain bronze images of Gauri, Chandrashekhar, Shrinivasa and Laxmi. The complex lies between hillocks.

In 2004, the temple was renovated by the Fundação Oriente.

The temple site is located near a tirtha (sacred water body) formed by the confluence of the Naroa and Mandovi rivers. This location is geographically significant as it marks the point where a freshwater spring meets the riverine system. The tank water is supplied by a natural spring. This water flows from the tank into a canal used to irrigate surrounding fields.

== Deities ==
In front of the temple towards the right side of the Deepastamba is a shrine of Kalbhairav and outside it are seen the padukas of Dattatraya carved on the stone. A little ahead of the Deepastamba are seen two huge laterite pillar-like structures buried deep. They may be stone henges. Behind the temple are carved stone walls with niches. It may have been an ancient Agrashala. Similarly, close to the temple there is a man-made tunnel-like structure which is presently silted. Near the temple site there is a sacred tank known as Panchaganga Tirtha which is used for ablutions by devotees on the birthday of Lord Shiva.

== Location ==
The village of Narve is about 35 km (22 mi) from Panaji and can be reached by an interesting route that requires a ferryboat from the island of Divar.

== See also ==
- 17th-century Western domes
