= Divar =

Divar Ilha de Piedade
- Island
- Location within Goa Location within India
- Coordinates: 15°31′31.6″N 73°53′59.9″E
- Country: India
- State: Goa
- District: North Goa
- Taluka: Ilhas
- Named for: Dipavati or 'Island of lamps'

Government
  - Type: 2 Panchayats, 3 Communidades
- Elevation: 8 m (26 ft)

Population
  - Total: approx. 2,250
- Time zone: UTC+5:30 (IST)
- Postcode: 403403
- Telephone code: 0832

The island of Divar (formerly Piedade) (Konkani: Divaddi, pronounced [d̪iːwaːɽiː]) (derived from the word Dipavati or 'small Island' in Konkani) lies in the Mandovi river in the Indian state of Goa.

It is one of six major islands within the Mandovi, the others being:

- Ilha de Goa,
- Chorão,
- Vanxim,
- Cumbarjua,
- St Estevam and
- Several other small mangrove islands and sand banks.

== Location ==
It is located approximately upriver 10 km (6 mi) from Panjim. The island is dis-connected from Old Goa on the south-east side, Ribandar, on the south-west side and Naroa on the north side, all by ferry. A launch also connects Divar to the city of Panjim from further north-west, in the island-village of Vanxim. The Konkan Railway passes through the village and the nearest stop to the village is the train station at Carambolim.

The approach to the village is passes through barren fields and small hills.

== Villages ==
Initially, there were three Communidades in Divar : Piedade, São Matias (now Malar), Goathias. The Piedade Communidade was later sub-divided into two, Goltim and Navelim.

According to legend, the original inhabitants of this island were people who once lived in Old Goa but had to desert during a disastrous pestilence that heavily decimated the population of Old Goa.

=== Piedade (Goltim-Navelim) ===
Spread at the bottom of a small forested hillock, Piedade, is a small typical Goan village. The Church of Our Lady of Compassion sits on top of this hillock overlooking the horizon. From the top of the hill, superb panoramic views of the surrounding countryside, including the meandering Mandovi river and Old Goa can be seen. Well maintained, elegant Portuguese villas can be seen dotting the island. The famous Bonderam festival is celebrated in Divar, on the fourth Saturday of August during the monsoon with great fanfare and attended by thousands of tourists and locals. In recent years, the inflow of non-Goans has changed the demographics, skyline and landscape of the village(s).

=== Sao Matias ===
Another typical Goan village, São Matias (now Malar) lies close to the island-village of Vanxim; which also part of the Malar Panchayat. The Konkan Railway passes through Malar, the nearest stop on the mainland is the train station at Carambolim. Ferry Connection from Narva to Narva-Bicholim, also Ferry Connection from the Island to Old Goa, and Ribander. The São Mathias Church was built by the Portuguese over 400 years ago. The St Mathias Sports Club is situated on the main road of the village. The locals here tend to have their own identity from the rest of the island. They celebrate Bonderam in the more traditional way with absolutely no floats.

=== Naroa ===
Naroa, located on the eastern tip of the island, has a population of barely a thousand people, with about 80 houses dotting the tiny village. This place was a site of a tirth place and also of a Hindu temple that remained up to the time of Portuguese conquest. The place because of sanctity attracted many devotees from all over. It was annually visited by devotees who came here to bathe and veneration. The Island subsequently became the residence place of many dignified families of Goa. It also houses three parochial churches and possesses a chapel of two images of Christ held in great veneration by the Catholics of the place. The ruins of a fort are evident in the northern part of the village.

==== Naroa Fort ====
Fort Naroa, located on the Island of Divar opposite the old city of Goa in Ilhas, was originally built by the Muslims. It was abandoned entirely in 1834 and is now in ruins and covered in foliage. It houses the Holy Sprit church, the only structure near its walls to still be preserved.

==== Porne Tirth ====
Porne Tirth, Porne Tirth (पोर्णे तीर्थ) simply means the old Tirth or pilgrimage place. This was the original site of Saptakoteshwar Temple, the Kul Devta or family deity of Kadamba kings. You will see a Koti tirth Lake (a Government Occupied Place archeological site, which has 108 carved small niches in its walls) and Hatkeshwar Temple Located on the riverside of the Mandovi River. According to local belief, devotees visiting Shri Saptakoteshwar Temple should also seek the blessings of Shri Hatkeshwar, as visiting both sacred sites is traditionally considered important for receiving complete blessings.

Thus, Porne Tirth, Koti Tirth and Shri Hatkeshwar Temple together form an important spiritual and historical heritage circuit connected with the ancient tradition of Shri Saptakoteshwar.

== History ==
The original inhabitants of this island were people who once lived in Old Goa but had to leave during a disastrous plague that greatly reduced the population of Old Goa. The natives are mainly of Luso-Indian and Goan descent.

It is believed that the Island of Divar was once a site of Hindu pilgrimage - one of many in India - and hosted the temples of Saptakoteshwar, Ganesh, Mahamaya and Dwarkeshwar. During the Christianization of Goa, in the 16th century, many were shifted, by the Goan Hindus, to other locations.

It's also said, that the current Cemetery near Church at hilltop once housed a Ganesh Temple, though studies performed by ASI found no archeological evidence to this claim. The Hindus rehabilitated it in village of Candolá near Marcel. Shirali, a village near Bhatkal in Karnataka claims to house a parts of the Shree Ganesh Mahamaya temples of Navelim and Goltim.

Rui Gomes Pereira in his book Goan Temples and Deities writes, "The original temple of Saptakoteshwar was constructed in the 12th century by the kings of Kadamba Dynasty. Saptakoteshwar was the patron deity of the Kadambas. The temple was destroyed by the Sultan of the Deccan in the middle of the 14th century. The Saptakoteshwar idol was then relocated to Naroa in Bicholim. Later, the temple was reconstructed at the same locality by Madhav Mantri of Vijaynagara at the close of the same century. However, it was then abandoned due to the diversion of pilgrims to the new temple, which now housed the idol. By the time the Portuguese found it, in 1515, the temple was a forgotten ruin in the wilderness." Prior to its destruction, the temple used to attract up to three thousand pilgrims from Goa itself during its annual procession. The present temple structure in Naroa has distinctive Indo-Portuguese architecture.

According to Dr Olivinho J F Gomes, Professor of Konkani, Divar was one of the first places the Portuguese ventured to convert locals to Christianity. The Hindu Brahmin and Kshatriya castes readily converted, thus creating the Bamonn and Chardó communities.

== Festivities ==
=== Bonderam ===
Similar to the Carnival, the famous Bonderam festival is celebrated in Divar on the fourth Saturday of August during the monsoon with great fanfare and attended by thousands of tourists and locals. Bonderam Festival: The festival is a memoir to the dispute and the fury of the Villagers over the Portuguese system of resolving the disputes. The villagers on the Divar Island often indulged in some kind of fight over the matter of ownership of their lands. To stop the disputes the Portuguese, put up flags at the boundaries. The villagers did not like this system. So they protested against the Portuguese by throwing stones at the flags. On this day a carnival ambiance is created. Each section of the village has a float at the parade. Melodious music could be heard throughout the village. The gaily coloured floats accompanied by colorfully dressed youngsters make a pretty picture.

=== Potekar ===
Similar to, Halloween, the Potekar festival is celebrated for three days before the start of Lent/ Ash Wednesday, where local youths wear homemade masks, costumes, cow bells; venturing around the village, receiving/demanding snacks & drinks from locals, and have licence to frighten the village children!

=== Feast of Our Lord Redeemer ===
The feast of the Miraculous Image of Our Lord Redeemer (Konkani: Jezu Soddvonnarachi Ojeapanchi Imaj) is celebrated every year at Piedade, Divar' in the month of November on a Sunday closest to 18 November. The traditional feast is celebrated by one of the village families and draws devotees from all over Goa. The image is said to have been brought by late Ferrão of Goltim, from Europe and was kept in his house which has today become the chapel.

== Churches ==
=== Church of Our Lady of Compassion, Piedade ===
The Church of Our Lady of Compassion is located in the village of Piedade; which though small, is one of the island's largest villages, that has great panoramic views. The church which was designed by a Goan priest is known to be the first Christian structure erected here and is a charismatic building dating from the early 1500s.

Archaeological studies have concluded that a temple had never existed on the site.

==== Church bell ====
The huge bell which today adorns the Se Cathedral in Old Goa was originally donated by the master of a sinking ship who'd made a vow that, were he to survive his fate, he would donate the ship's bell to the first church village, town, or city his vessel touched. It so happened that that island was Divar. In keeping with his promise, he donated the bell to the church of Divar, which is located on a high hillock. Unfortunately though, every time the bell was struck, it shattered the windows of the church and the houses in the vicinity, so a deal was struck and the bell was exchanged with that of the Se Cathedral.

=== São Matias, Malar ===
This church is 410 years old and is dedicated to St. Mathias. The village derives its name from the church.

=== Our Lady of Candelaria, Naroa ===
The devotion to Our Lady of Candelaria is characteristic of fishermen and became relatively common in the Iberian Peninsula only in the 18th century. The Chapel of Our Lady of Candelaria or Purification on Divar Island is a round building covered by a hemispherical vault with skylight cupola. The exterior wall is articulated by pilasters topped above the cornice balustrade by ball pinnacles. A long nave in the form of a stone shed was recently added hiding the east-facing door giving access to the rotunda. Another shed-like construction hides the small sanctuary to the west. It is probable that the dedication to Our Lady of Candelaria dates to 1763, when the chapel was subject to major interventions on the initiative of Viceroy Manuel de Saldanha, Count of Ega (1758-1765). The windows and round oculi with scroll pediments we see ornamenting the rotunda's perimeter may be ascribed to the tastes of that period. The original chapel was founded in 1543, perhaps dedicated to Our Lady of Pity; the devotion was later transferred to the main church of Divar. A century later, in 1633, the chapel must have been redone in the form we see today. The date is inscribed at the base of an image of Our Lady. Almost all the architectural moulding, especially the shafts and pinnacles, seems to be early 17th century. The rotunda's entrance nevertheless seems to be from the middle of the previous century, dating perhaps to when the original chapel was founded. Two narrow shafted pilasters with plant motifs support a sharp triangular pediment above an overly weak frieze. Although this was just an isolated chapel, the building dedicated to Our Lady of Candelaria is significant in the context of architecture in the former Estado da Índia, where churches and chapels with central plans are rare, except in Goa's Islands district. The Naroa chapel stands out from all other chapels or chapel vestiges with central plans on the Islands due to its size and formal perfection.

== Temples ==
Divar has a sizable number of temples, all of which are relatively new and constructed after the 1961 liberation of Goa by India. The oldest and most prominent of them is the Shri Ganesh Sateri Temple at Sateri Bhat, name after the immigrants from Satari sub-district. There are three other temples of Ganesh - one at Navelim, one at hilltop near the Church of Nossa Senhora de Piedade and third is at Maddar wado.

== Cuisine ==
=== Urak ===
Divar is one of few places in Goa you will find Urak (mild version of Cashew Feni) all-year round. For a small island, Divar has a variety of bars, serving Urak & local food (esp. seafood).

== Notable people ==
Chefs (Culinary)

• Chef Urbano Cruz do Rego Hailed as ‘the Godfather of Goan cuisine’, Chef Urbano Cruz do Rego also known as Chef Rego hails from Divar. He went to Mumbai to become a professional Footballer. However, after damaging his eardrum during practice Chef Rego turned to the culinary world to explore his talent. He has been dishing out Goan cuisine to the world for over 50 years and has served multiple world leaders throughout his career.

=== Clergy ===
- Dom Matheus de Castro (c. 1594−1679) the first Indian Bishop of The Catholic Church, was a native of Divar. He was consecrated Bishop of Chrysopolis by the Vatican and sent to India during the Viceroyalty of Conde de Aveiras (1635–1640), as Vicar Apostolic for the Kingdoms of Bijapur, Golconda, Abyssinia and Pegu.
- His Nephew Dom Thomas de Castro (c. 1621–1689) was consecrated Bishop of Fulsivelem by the Vatican in 1671. He was appointed Vicar Apostolic for the Kingdoms of Cochin, Tamor, Madurai, Mysore, Cranganore, Cannanore and the Coast of Canara.
- Fr. Jacome Gonsalves (c.1676-1742), Catholic missionary to Sri Lanka, "Father of Sinhala Catholic literature"
- Fr. José Antonio Gonçalves of Divar: He was one of the initiators of the Conspiracy of the Pintos; and planned a rebellion against Portuguese Rule, in 1787. He was Professor of Philosophy at the (former Jesuit) College of Maddel, Chorão.

=== Musicians ===
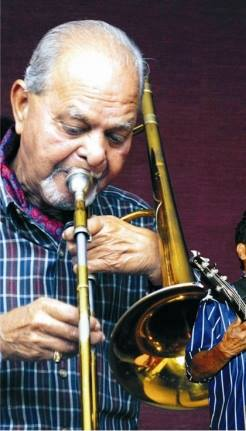
Anibal Castro

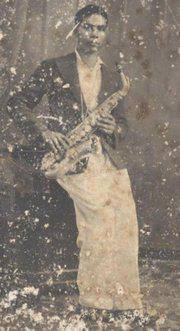
Jose Pacheco

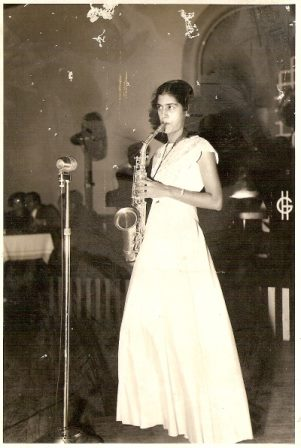
Lucila Pacheco
- Anibal Castro, the legendary trombonist, who was also fluent with multiple instruments i.e. guitar, saxophone, flute, sitar etc., had been performing for over 50 years until he died on 3 November 2016 in Mumbai. His first musical breaks were in 1950s Bombay recording at the Bollywood studios of Shankar and Jaikaishen. He performed with musicians in India, Europe and the US playing classical, blues, jazz and big band music and accompanied Mohammed Rafi and his entourage during their US tour. Some of the great Indian Classical musicians like Pandit Shivkumar Sharma, Pandit Chourasia, Pandit Trilok Gurtu learnt western musical harmony from this great Musician of Divar. He performed at the famous Bombay Jazz Yatra of 1978 and at other western and Indian music fusion concerts with great Indian classical musicians such as Ustad Allarkha and Bhavani Shankar. He is a descendant of the same family as Dom. Matheus de Castro the first Indian Bishop of the Catholic Church.
- Jose Mathias Pacheco, was a bandleader at Madras Gymkanna Club. He migrated to Ceylon in the 1940s and worked as piano tuner in Colombo. returned to Madras and started a music business hiring pianos & other instruments ( tuning & repairing ) while playing double bass for the Madras Philharmonic Orchestra and various other bands. Retired to Goa in the 1970s (d. Feb 19, 1976). He owned more than 100 pianos during his lifetime.
- Lucila Pacheco, in the mid-1960s caused a sensation in the Bombay film studios for being the first female to play an electronic instrument. In the 1940s Lucilla Pacheco was one of the few women on the Bombay jazz scene, playing in the all-star band of Mickey Correa at the Taj Mahal Hotel and with the Anglo-Indian band leader Ken Mac. She later joined the Hindi film industry, and performed regularly with the arranger Anthony Gonsalves.

== See also ==
- Goa
- Velha Goa
- Vanxim
- Chorão
