= Parakrama Niriella =

Sri Lankan dramatist and filmmaker

Parakrama Niriella පරාක්‍රම නිරිඇල්ල
- Born: Krishanadasa Narayana Bandaranayaka Brahmachari Mudiyanselage Parakrama Bandara Niriella; 18 April,1949; Ratnapura, Sri Lanka
- Occupations: Film, Theatre and Television director, producer, screen writer, lyricist
- Years active: 1974–present
- Spouse: Rukmanie Gomes Abesinghe Jayawardena Niriella
- Children: Jeewantha Bandara Niriella, Savindi Niriella
- Awards: Doctor of Philosophy, Honorary Doctorate from the University of Visual and Performing Arts, Colombo (2024). Series of Local and International Awards Awards including Transtel Prize from Prix Futura, Berlin (1986)

Krishanadasa Narayana Bandaranayaka Brahmachari Mudiyanselage Parakrama Bandara Niriella (පරාක්‍රම නිරිඇල්ල; born 18 April, 1949), popularly known as Parakrama Niriella, is a Sri Lankan director in Sri Lankan cinema, theater and television. One of the pioneer dramatists in Sri Lankan drama, Niriella is the founder of the "Janakaraliya" Drama troupe. He is also a stage playwright, a film script writer.

== Personal life ==
In 1971, Niriella got the first job in the Sri Lankan Navy in Trincomalee in civil section.

== Career ==
Niriella studied at Hunumulla Central College and Drama & Theater from the Art Center Theater Academy of the Lionel Wendt Memorial Center in Colombo under the veteran drama director Dhamma Jagoda. He started drama career with Gamini Haththotuwegama in the 1970s in Sri Lanka's first street drama troupe. He worked as the street drama organizer in Haththotuwegama's street drama troop. On December 31, 1976. he produced his first stage play Sekkuwa which was played at Lumbini Theater. The play won several awards at the State Drama Festival in 1976. Niriella won the award for the Best script. In 1998, the play was staged as a new production. In 2017, a series of celebrations were held to celebrate the achievements of Sekkuwa in the drama industry in Sri Lanka. It was held on the 13 February 2017 at the University of Colombo University of Visual and Performing Arts at 4.00 pm. In January 2017, Sekkuwa was presented at the annual polymorphic International Drama Festival held by the Institute of Theater Performing Arts in Mysore, Karnataka, India. He was the chief guest on the opening day of the International Drama Festival.

He continued to produce many stage plays such as Vinischaya in 1979 and Galileo in 1983. Then he produced Uththamavi in 1989. Afterwards, together with H. A. Perera, Niriella produced Warenthu in 1998.

Niriella directed two feature films - Siri Medura in 1989 and Ayoma in 1995. Both films were critically acclaimed and won several awards at local film festivals. In 2009, Henry Jayasena granted the rights to play Hunuwataye Kathawa through a contract. His play Charandas often played outdoors in different setups without using theater lighting effects and stage designs. The play won the highest award at the 1983 Edinburgh Drama Festival in England. In 1985, his tele-film of 90 minutes durationKadaima won special jury prize from the Golden Crest International TV Festival of Poldiv, Bulgaria and then Transtel prize for the prix Futra International TV Festival of Berlin.

In 1999, Niriella handed over an alternative theater program to the National Youth Services Council. But at that time, it was not implemented due to the scarcity of the youth service council. Without any government funds, Niriella along with Udul Bandara Awusadahami took the responsibility for a plan for the mobile theater. On 29 July 2004, he created "Janakaraliya" Mobile Drama troupe Theatre of the people) with the help of HIVOS institute, Netherlands with 20 members. It is the first time that Sri Lanka drama use New Arena concept. The first play created by "Janakaraliya" is Andara Mal. He produced the play Mati Karaththaya which won many awards at State Drama Festival. For the first time in Sri Lanka drama history, a Tamil actor won the Best Supporting Actor award and Sinhalese actor wins best supporting actor in Tamil drama for the play Mati Karaththaya.

In 2014, he won the awards for the best direction and Best Play at State Drama Festival for the play Hunuwataya, his own translation of Bertolt Brecht's "Caucasian Chalk Circle". In 2016, Niriella produced the Tamil version of Bertolt Brecht's "Caucasian Chalk Circle" translated by Dr.Kulanthai Shanmugalingam of Jaffna, with the title "Venkatti Vattam". On 13 January 2017, he inaugurated Bahuroopi international theatre festival.

In 2019, Niriella produced two stage plays titled Wangagiriya and Gira Panthiya. The play Wangagiriya is based on the short story by the same name written by Dharmasena Pathiraja in the 1960s. The play Gira Panthiya is based on the short Illustration Parrot's Tale written by Rabindranath Tagore.

== Direction ==
=== Theater ===
| Year | Stage Play |
|---|---|
| 1976 | Sekkuwa |
| 1979 | Vinischaya |
| 1984 | Galileo |
| 1989 | Uththamavi |
| 1995 | Warenthu |
| 2004 | Andara Mal |
| 2004 | Seethambara Pata |
| 2005 | Makara Raksha |
| 2005 | Charandas (Sinhala) |
| 2006 | Charandas (Tamil) |
| 2010 | Mati Karaththaya |
| 2012 | Kalpanthaya |
| 2013 | Hunuwataya |
| 2014 | Mrichkatiham (Tamil) |
| 2015 | Wenkatti Wattam (Tamil) |
| 2017 | Hirunegenathuru |
| 2018 | Girapanthiya' |
| 2023 | Kora Saha Andhaya |
| 2023 | Walahediya |
| 2024 | Heda Wena Balu Nada |

=== Cinema ===
| Year | Film |
|---|---|
| 1980 | The First and The Last(Short Film) |
| 1989 | Siri Medura |
| 1995 | Ayoma |
| 2025 | Sihinayaki Depa Nethi (Feetless Dream) |

=== Tele-Drama ===
| Year | Tele-Drama |
|---|---|
| 1984 | La Hiru Dahasak |
| 1984 | Sasara Sayuren |
| 1985 | Yashoravaya |
| 1985 | Kada Ima |
| 1994 | Sandagiri Pvva |
| 1999 | Sudo Sudu |
| 2000 | Mihimadala Giniwadie |
