= Lakshmi Narayan Devasthan, Narvem =

Hindu temple in Naroa, Bicholim, Goa

Religion
- Affiliation: Hinduism

Location
- Location: Naroa, Bicholim, Goa, India

Lakshmi Narayan Devasthan is a temple situated in the village of Naroa, Bicholim, Goa.

== History ==
The temple was established in 1650 CE by Sagasti Shet, a merchant belonging to the Gurjar (Gujarati) community who migrated from Diu to Goa for trade and business. Built through his own efforts with the assistance of fellow community members residing in Goa, the temple was founded specifically for the Gujarati community.

== Governance ==
The mahajans (patrons) of the temple belong to the Gujarati community. However, any Goan Hindu is permitted to perform religious rituals and observe celebrations at the temple, provided they receive approval from the Mahajan Sabha (assembly of patrons) and follow the religious rules set by the institution.

At the time of its foundation, the original founders included a constitutional provision permitting the shrine to be relocated from Narvem to any other convenient site if required. The founder also instituted financial and administrative arrangements to cover the temple's daily operational expenses, mahanivedya (sacred food offerings), routine worship, and annual festival celebrations. The constitutional regulations of the temple list twelve individuals as its kulavi mahajans (hereditary patrons).

== Festivals ==
The temple observes several annual festivals and religious ceremonies, which include Gokulashtami, Gaulan Kalo, Maha Shivaratri, Vadya Ekadashi and Phoolanpuja (celebrated on Kartik Purnima).
