= Kulanthai Shanmugalingam =

Sri Lankan dramatist and playwright (1931–2025)

- குழந்தை ம. சண்முகலிங்கம்
- Born: Mayilvaganam Shanmugalingam; 15 November 1931; Jaffna, Sri Lanka
- Died: 17 January 2025 (aged 93); Jaffna, Sri Lanka
- Education: B.A. University of Madras (1957)
- Alma mater: University of Colombo
- Occupation: Playwright
- Writing career
- Pen name: Kulandai Shanmugalingam
- Language: Tamil
- Notable works: Enthayum Thayum; Man Sumantha Meniyar

Kulanthai M. Shanmugalingam (also spelled Kulandai; Tamil: குழந்தை ம. சண்முகலிங்கம்; 15 November 1931 – 17 January 2025), also known by his birth name Mayilvaganam Shanmugalingam, was a Sri Lankan dramatist and playwright that worked primarily in the Tamil language.

Shanmugalingam was well known for his shunning of publicity and accolades, becoming a household name in the Jaffna Peninsula for his work ethic and for his dedication to preserving art, rather than seeking awards or public recognition. He rarely made public appearances or gave interviews and vehemently refused a presidential award conferred by the University of Jaffna.

== Early life ==
Shanmugalingam was born on 15 November 1931 in Jaffna but lived in Bolawatta in the Negombo area, where his father worked as an estate official, until the age of ten. He grew up as a shy, introverted child who was labeled a mama's boy; he received his nickname Kulanthai or "Baby" as a child for his shyness. He became familiar with Jaffna only after the age of ten.

He learnt the art of the Sinhala language and the diversity of Sri Lanka through mingling with Sinhalese people. He considered both Tamil and Sinhala to be his mother tongues and also learnt English when he attended a Catholic school in Bolawatta.

His mother, worried about his reserved character, enrolled him at the Thirunelvely Young Men's Hindu Association. He later went to India to pursue his BA from 1953 to 1957 at Madras University, studying economics, history, and politics, and subsequently was admitted to Bangalore Mysore University.

Shanmugalingam returned to Jaffna after completing his degree in 1957 and soon got a job as a teacher at Senkundha Hindu College. He also worked for 22 years as a teacher at St. Joseph's College, Jaffna.

In 1976, he completed a diploma in drama at the University of Colombo and resumed his teaching career. In 1981, he transferred back to the Senguntha Hindu College and from 1986 to 2004, he was engaged in full-time drama teaching at the University of Colombo.

== Theatrical and literary career ==
Shanmugalingam did not initially intend to become a dramatist or a theatrical performer, but befriended popular Indian theatre actor Cho Ramasamy while in India. Upon his return to Sri Lanka he rejoined the Thirunelvely Young Men's Hindu Association. Soon after the conclusion of a bharathanatyam event at the YMHA, he decided to get the attention of Kalai-Arasu Sornalingam, who was regarded as one of the stalwarts of Tamil theatre, and recited the lines from the popular Indian play Raja Raja Cholan as if he were practicing them.

However, his efforts appeared to be in vain as Sornalingam seemingly took no notice of him before leaving the event, much to the disappointment of Kulanthai. However, six months later he learned that Kalai-Arasu Sornalingam himself wanted to meet him.

Shanmugalingam became a playwright in part because one of the foremost Tamil writers of that time, Sitpi Saravanapavan, was unable to provide their acting troupe with scripts because of his hectic schedule. This happy accident proved to be a blessing in disguise for Shanmugalingam, as he became well-known as a playwright. He admitted he was never a genius although some of his plays made it into school textbooks. He predominantly worked on children's plays, as he was continuing to work as a school teacher.

When he studied drama at the University of Colombo he was the sole Tamil student in courses taught mostly by Sinhala dramatists, veterans of drama including Dhamma Jagoda, Henry Jayasena, Dharmasiri Bandaranayake, Ernest MacIntyre, Solomon Fonseka and K. Sivathamby.

Most of Shanmugalingam's writings at this time were inspired by current events. During a time when the area was marred by civil conflicts most of his dramas focused on the struggles people faced in their daily lives and often served as timely healing for the people in Northern Province.

His most popular work was Enthayum Thayum, which he wrote in 1991 at the request of his son, who requested a play relevant for Canadian Tamil expatriates. The play deals with the lives of parents who have sent their children abroad and find themselves alone in their last years. The play became popular in countries where the Tamil diaspora was present and was also staged in Batticaloa and Colombo.

He continued to make dramas with themes linking the concepts of home, migration and displacement, which was familiar territory for the people living in Northern parts of Sri Lanka since the 1980s. His play Man Sumantha Meniyar (Sweat and dust on their shoulders) is linked to the peasants caught in the 40-year Sri Lankan civil war.

In July 2016, he translated The Caucasian Chalk Circle by Bertolt Brecht in order to stage the play at the University of Visual and Performing Arts, Colombo. His drama Heaven with Hell also speaks volumes about him being a canny operator in Tamil theatre history. The play was released in book form and it depicted the aspects of important topics such as migration and social mobility within Tamil society while also combining philosophical aspects such as detachment and attachment. The book Heaven with Hell was translated into English by S. Pathmanathan and it was launched in February 2022 in Jaffna.

He was one of the recipients of the Governor's Award in 2004 as part of the Provincial Tamil Literary Festival organized by the Ministry of Education and Cultural Affairs of the Northeast Province.

== Death ==
Shanmugalingam died at Jaffna, Sri Lanka, on 17 January 2025, at the age of 93. At the time of his death, he was one of Sri Lanka's oldest living playwrights.
