= São Matias, Goa =

São Mathias Malar and São Matias
- Village
- São Matias Igreja, Divar

- Location within Goa Location within India
- Coordinates: 15°31′39.5″N 73°54′58.8″E
- Country: India
- State: Goa
- District: North Goa
- Taluka: Ilhas
- Established: 1540
- Named for: São Matias

Government
  - Type: Panchayat
  - Sarpanch: seat vacant

Area
  - Total: 4.70 km^{2} (1.81 sq mi)
- Elevation: 8 m (26 ft)

Population (2011)
  - Total: 1,630
  - Density: 347/km^{2} (898/sq mi)
- Demonym: Malari

Languages
  - Official: Konkani
  - Also Spoken (understood): English, Marathi, Hindi
  - Historical: Portuguese

Religions
  - Dominant: Christianity
  - Minor: Hinduism, Islam, Atheism
  - Historical: Roman Catholicism
- Time zone: UTC+5:30 (IST)
- Postcode: 403403
- Telephone code: 0832
- Vehicle registration: none

São Mathias also known as Malar is a village on Divar Island, Tiswadi or Ilhas, in the Indian state of Goa. The island is located 10 km upriver from Panjim.

A ferry connects São Mathias to the island village of Vanxim; also part of the São Mathias Panchayat. The Konkan Railway passes through São Mathias, the nearest stop on the mainland is the train station at Carambolim. Ferry Connection from Narva to Narva- Bicholim, also Ferry Connection from the Island to Old Goa, and Ribandar.

São Matias is surrounded by Piedade and Panjim towards west, Ponda towards East, Margão Taluk towards South. This Place is in the border of the North Goa District and South Goa District. It is near to Arabian Sea so there is a chance of humidity in the weather.

The São Mathias Church was built by the Portuguese over 400 years ago. The St Mathias Sports Club is situated on the main road of the village.

== Churches ==
St. Mathias Church, Malar, Divar

=== São Matias Igreja ===
This church is 410 years old and is dedicated to St. Mathias. The village derives its name from the church. It was established between 1590-1597.

== Cemeteries ==
=== Malar Cemetery ===
São Matias (Malar) Cemetery

It is located near the Church of São Mathias. Many artistic graves can be found here. It houses a chapel. Due to lack of space, niches are being made into the walls for burying the dead.

== Festivals ==
=== Bonderam ===
The famous Bonderam festival is celebrated in São Mathias a week earlier than in Divar, at the end of August during the monsoon and attended by thousands of tourists and locals. The festival is held in memory of the dispute and the fury of the villagers over the Portuguese system of resolving the disputes. The villagers on Divar Island often indulged in fights over the matter of ownership of their lands. To stop the disputes, the Portuguese put up flags at the boundaries. The villagers did not like this system and so they protested against the Portuguese by throwing stones at the flags. On this day a carnival ambience is created. Each section of the village has a float at the parade. Melodious music is played throughout the village. The gaily colored floats accompanied by colorfully dressed youngsters make a pretty picture.

=== Potekar ===
The Potekar festival is celebrated across the island for three days before the start of Lent/Ash Wednesday, where local youths wear home made masks, costumes and cow bells, venturing around the village, receiving and demanding snacks and drinks from locals, and have licence to frighten the village children.

== Government ==
São Mathias Village Panchayat

=== Traditional Government ===
Since at least the establishment of the sovereignty of the Portuguese crown over the island, and the adoption of the Foral of Afonso Mexia in 1526, the traditional government of the village of São Mathias was the comunidade of Malar. The centrality of this local government was displaced with the establishment of Indian sovereignty over the territory of Goa and the extension of the Panchayat system from India.

=== Post-1961 ===
The panchayat of São Mathias also caters to the villages of Naroa and Vanxim.

== Notable residents ==
=== Bishop Mathias Sebastião Francisco Fernandes ===
Born on 4 Nov 1917, Mathias Fernandes was a seminarian at the Seminary of Rachol and ordained priest on 26 Oct 1944. He was appointed Bishop of the Diocese of Mysore on 16 Nov 1963, and consecrated to this position on 3 Feb 1964, the first native to hold this position. In this course of his pastoral duties Bishop Mathias attended two sessions - three and four - of the Vatican Council II. He died on 9 May 1985 while incumbent in his position as Bishop of Mysore.

=== Armando Menezes ===
Born on 11 May 1902 in, São Matias, Armando Menezes was a poet, writer, academic and civil servant. He died in 1983 in Bombay.

== See also ==
- Velha Goa
- Divar
- Vanxim
- Piedade
