= Mathias Fernandes =

Roman Catholic bishop (1917–1985)

Mathias Sebastião Francisco Fernandes
- Bishop of Mysore
- Church: Catholic Church
- Diocese: Mysore
- Installed: 16 November 1963
- Term ended: 9 May 1985
- Predecessor: René Feuga

Orders
- Ordination: 16 November 1963
- Consecration: 3 February 1964

Personal details
- Born: 4 November 1917 São Matias, Goa, India
- Died: 9 May 1985 (aged 67)
- Buried: St. Philomena's Cathedral, Mysore
- Denomination: Roman Catholic
- Residence: Mysore
- Education: Rachol Seminary

Bishop Mathias Sebastião Francisco Fernandes (4 November 1917 — 9 May 1985) was a Roman Catholic bishop, the first native to be bishop of Diocese of Mysore in Mysore, India (16 November 1963 — 9 May 1985). His tenure was marked by the introduction of a number of religious orders offering educational opportunities within the diocese. He was of Goan origin.

== Priest, Bishop ==
Fernandes was born on 4 November 1917 in São Matias, Goa. He attended Rachol Seminary and was ordained priest on 26 October 1944. He served as parish priest of the St. Philomena's Cathedral in Mysore and later as Bishop of Mysore (16 November 1963 — 9 May 1985, consecrated 3 February 1964). Bishop Mathias attended Sessions 3 and 4 of the Vatican Council II.

== Contributions ==
=== Educational ===
Bishop Fernandes supported efforts of the church in establishing schools in the diocese.

With his backing, the Ursuline Sisters to set up a number of schools. He also supported the work of the Apostolic Carmelites to open a school. The Congregation of the Sisters of the Little Flower of Bethany open a school during his tenure. He invited The Sisters of Notre Dame to work in the diocese. They established a high school. Bishop Fernandes also backed the founding of St. Joseph's College of Education in Mysore. As was his predecessor, Bishop René Feuga, he was also a patron of St. Philomena’s College in Mysore. St. Matthias School in Mysore was set up in memory of Bishop Fernandes. With Fernandes's support, the Little Sisters of the Poor opened a home for the aged in Mysore.

=== Ecclesiastical governance ===
Soon after his consecration, Bishop Fernandes erected a structure for a church in Malavalli, a town in the district of Mandya. The church and parish of the patron saint of the Bishop's ancestral village are dedicated to Saint Mathias.

He enabled the Ursuline Franciscan sisters to establish the Christu Raj Convent, in Hanur, which was established on 11 June 1979.

In 1979, the Bishop requested the Bethany congregation to set up a convent in Kutta, in the Coorg (now Kodagu) district, to meet local educational and pastoral needs. This was inaugurated as the St. Mary in November 1981; it also administers the school of St. Mary's in the same settlement.

Members of the Institute of the Sisters of Charity of Sts. Bartolomea Capitanio and Vincenza Gerosa (SCCG) set up Aashirvad in Krishna Raja Pete, and the school Capitanio Nilaya in the same location, after being invited by the Bishop, to work in education, health-care and socio-pastoral work.

In 1984, Bishop Fernandes invited the Congregation of the Sisters of St. Anne, Bangalore, to start a new foundation at Pushpagiri, Belvathagrama, some 7 km from Mysore city, initially to run the existing Kannada Primary School belonging to the parish and to help in the parish activities. This led to the establishment of the Convent of St. Anne in the village.

Bishop Mathias was able to persuade the Royal Family of Mysore to sell the Rani Thota property to the Discalced Carmelites of the Manjummel Province where they established Pushpagrama in 1962.

Following the Second Vatican Council, which urged that seminarians have graduated before entry into the novitiate, the Society of the Divine Word (Società del Verbo Divino - SVD) in 1972 decided to base their formation house in the city of Mysore, a proposal welcomed by Bishop Fernandes which enabled the establishment of Vidya Niketan in 1974. He was also involved in inaugurating a new system of formation in 1983.

=== Ecumenical, inter-religious dialogue ===
Bishop Fernandes is credited with having initiated and guided the project of producing the first inter-confessional Bible in the Kannada language, completed in 1998.

His web of friendships also spread to people of other religions, as is evidenced by the narrative of Dr. K. Javeed Nayeem, who was entrusted the Bishop's pectoral cross with the charge to hand it over to the Bishop should he survive, or to his successor in the event of his death.

== Death ==
Fernandes died of sepsis on 9 May 1985. He is buried in the St. Philomena's Cathedral in Mysore.
