= Dwarf coconut =

Common term for several varieties of coconut

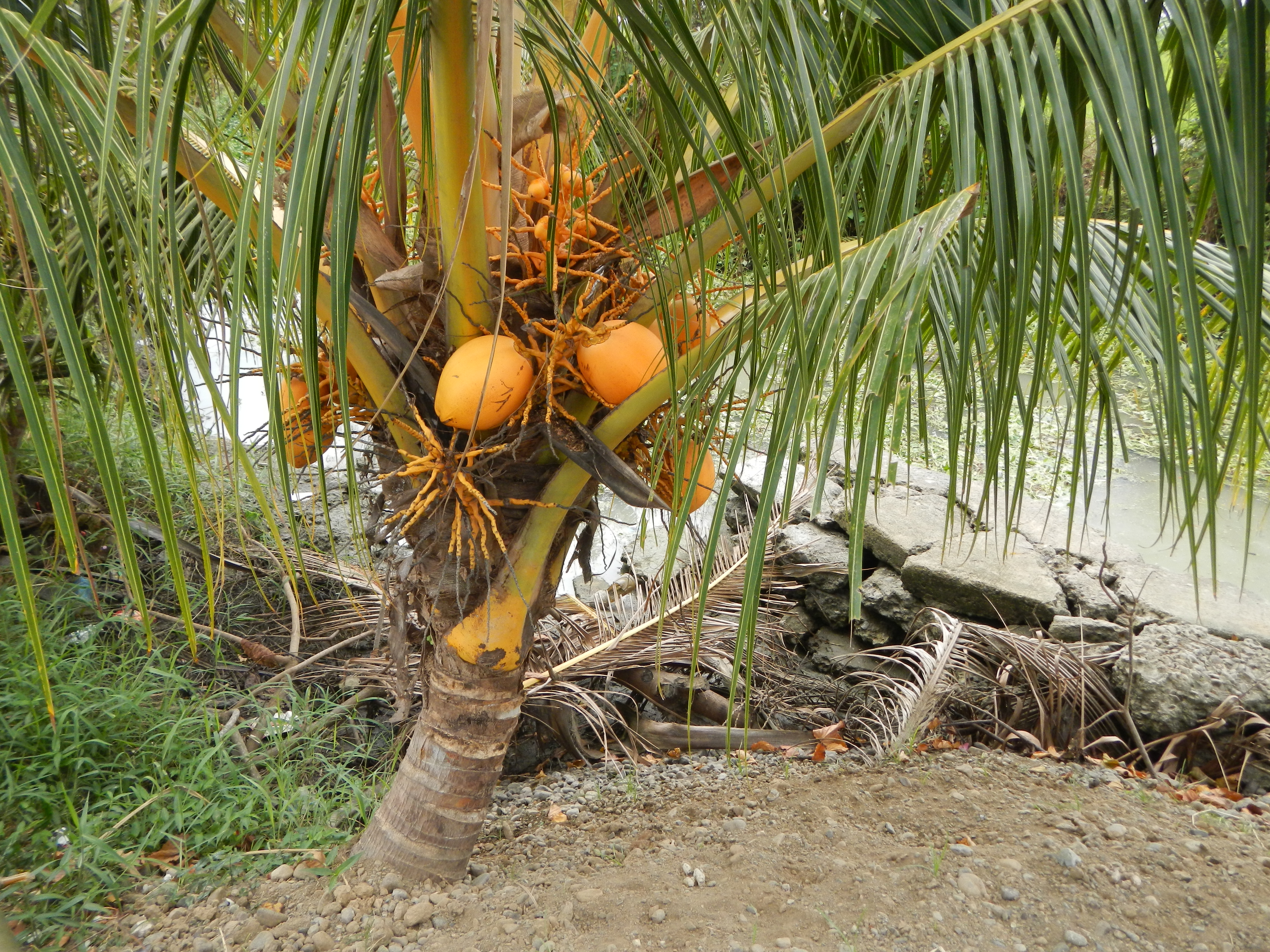
A typical dwarf coconut

Dwarf coconuts (Cocos nucifera L. var. nana) are a genetically-distinct group of cultivars of the coconut palm that are characterized by slow stem growth, self-pollination, rounded (niu vai) fruits, earlier fruit-bearing, and shorter lifespans. They grow to a full height of 15 to 30 feet (4.6 to 9.1 m), in contrast to "Tall" cultivars which can grow up to 50 to 100 feet (15 to 30 m).

Dwarf coconuts were originally domesticated by the Austronesian peoples in Southeast Asia in ancient times. They are relatively genetically uniform and likely descended from a single domesticated population artificially-selected by early Austronesian farmers for specific traits. Along with other Pacific coconuts, they were carried as canoe plants throughout the maritime migrations of Austronesians in the Indo-Pacific. Numerous other Dwarf cultivars were also developed after they were introduced to other regions.

The niu leka ('Fiji Dwarf') cultivars of Polynesia are also sometimes classified as Dwarf coconuts due to similarities in habit. But they are genetically distinct and were independently domesticated, likely in Tonga.

== Description ==
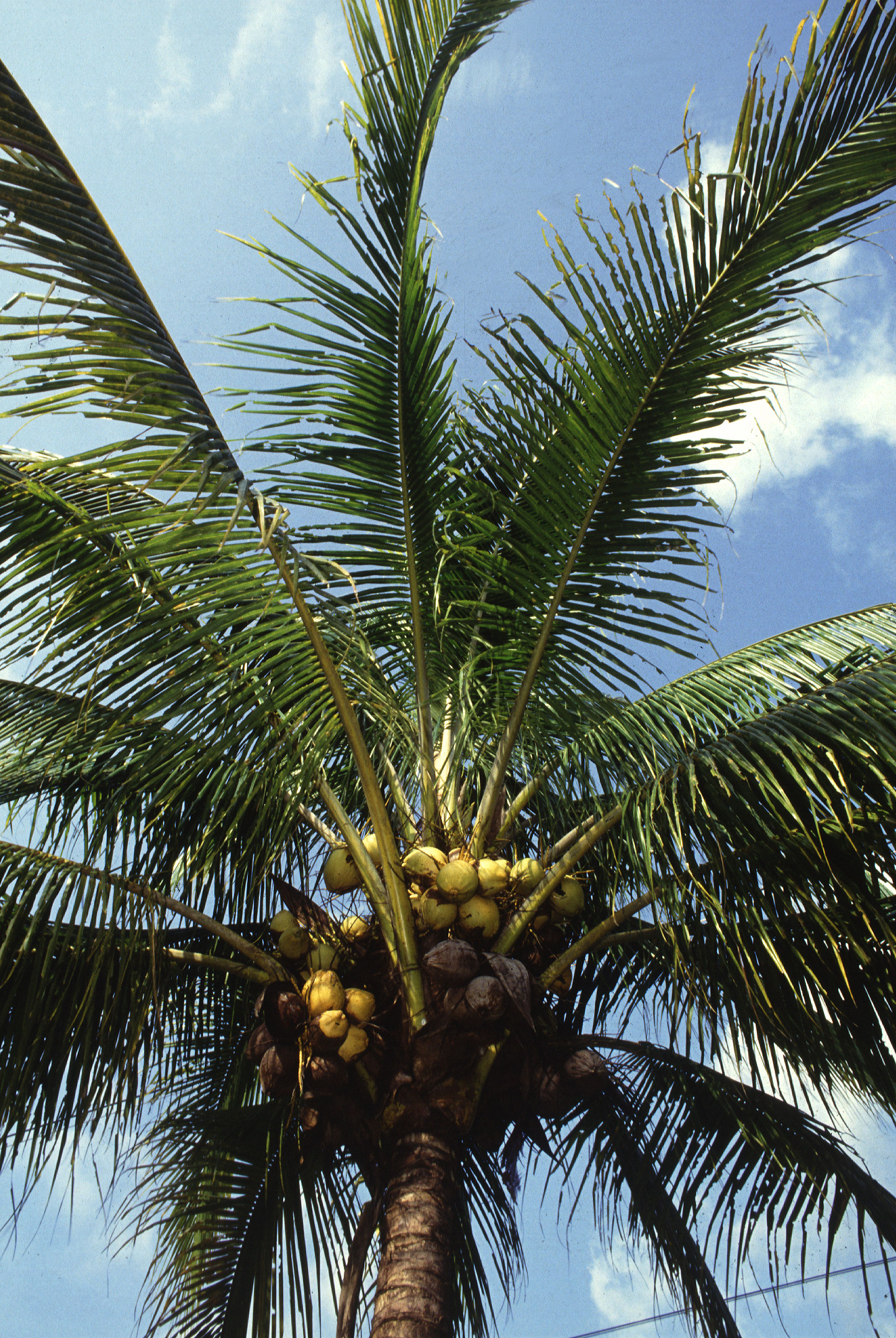
Fully-grown 'Tacunan Green Dwarf' in Puerto Rico

Coconuts can be broadly divided into two general types based on habit: the "Tall" (var. typica) and "Dwarf" (var. nana) varieties. The two groups are genetically distinct, with the Dwarf variety showing a greater degree of artificial selection for ornamental traits and for early germination and fruiting. The Tall variety is outcrossing while Dwarf palms are self-pollinating, which has led to a much greater degree of genetic diversity within the Tall group. Dwarf cultivars are relatively rare, constituting only around 5% of the total coconut population in the world.

Dwarf coconuts are shorter than Tall coconuts. But despite the misleading use of the term "dwarf", they are still considerably tall once fully-grown. Dwarf coconuts grow to a full height of 15 to 30 feet (4.6 to 9.1 m), in contrast to Tall cultivars which can grow up to 50 to 100 feet (15 to 30 m). Dwarf coconuts usually have shorter fronds that do not grow longer than 4 metres (13 ft). They also typically do not possess boles (the swelling at the base the coconut stem), with some exceptions like the 'Tacunan Green Dwarf'.

Dwarf coconuts bear fruits earlier, at around 3 to 4 years after planting, in contrast to Tall cultivars, which start bearing fruits at 8 to 10 years after planting. However, Dwarf coconuts have a shorter lifespan of 40 to 50 years, unlike Tall coconuts which can live for 80 to 90 years. Dwarf coconut fruits tend to be smaller and more numerous. They usually have bright green, yellow, or red coloration.

== Origin ==
- - - - - Malayan Green Dwarf
        - - - Salak Green Dwarf
            - - Malayan Red Dwarf
              - Malayan Yellow Dwarf
      - - - Marshall Islands Green Dwarf
          - - Gangabondam Green Dwarf
            - Raja Brown Dwarf
        - - - Tacunan Green Dwarf
            - - Catigan Green Dwarf
              - Pilipog Green Dwarf
          - - - Aromatic Green Dwarf
              - Xiem Green Dwarf
            - - Brazilian Green Dwarf
              - Thailand Green Dwarf
  - - Chowghat Green Dwarf
    - Sri Lanka Green Dwarf
- - King Coconut
  - - Cameroon Red Dwarf
    - - Chowghat Orange Dwarf
      - Pemba Red Dwarf
- - - Papua New Guinea Yellow Dwarf
    - Tahiti Red Dwarf
  - - Mangipod Green Dwarf
    - - Rabaul Red Dwarf
      - - Nicaragua Green Dwarf
        - - Vanuatu Red Dwarf
          - - Gazelle Red
            - Talasea Red Tall

Phylogenetic tree of selected Dwarf coconut cultivars, per Perera et al. (2016)

Dwarf coconut cultivars are fully domesticated, unlike the more diverse Tall cultivars. Dwarf cultivars of Pacific coconuts haves been cultivated by Austronesian peoples since ancient times. They were selected for slower growth, sweeter coconut water, and often brightly colored fruits.

All Dwarf coconuts are a genetically uniform subgroup of the Pacific coconuts (native to the Central Indo-Pacific; differentiated from the Indo-Atlantic coconuts from southern India and Sri Lanka). The Dwarf variety was first domesticated in Southeast Asia, which contain the Tall cultivars genetically closest to Dwarf coconuts.

Dwarf coconuts share three genetic markers out of thirteen (rare in Tall cultivars), making it likely that they originate from a single domesticated population. Dwarf coconuts naturally cross with Tall cultivars, resulting in "intermediate" types called "semi-Talls", which are self-pollinating but fast-growing. Thus the Dwarf gene pool would not have remained stable without continuous artificial selection by early farmers to produce true-to-type offspring, which also points to a common domestication origin. Philippine and Malayan Dwarf coconuts diverged early into two distinct types. They usually remain genetically isolated when introduced to new regions. Along with other Pacific coconuts, they were carried as canoe plants throughout the maritime migrations of Austronesians in the Indo-Pacific. Numerous other Dwarf cultivars developed after such introductions, hybridizing with Tall cultivars.

== Hybrids ==
Many inter-varietal hybrid coconuts are crosses of Dwarf and Tall varieties. They exhibit a mix of the characteristics of the two morphological varieties. They are also marked by hybrid vigor, being high-yielding while also resistant to diseases and environmental stressses. As such, they are preferred in plantations for copra and coconut oil production. However, this is limited by the practicality of producing F1 hybrid seeds on a large scale.

Dwarf and Tall hybrids are can use either a Tall female parent and a Dwarf male parent (T × D) or a Dwarf female parent and a Tall male parent (D × T). For example, the 'Kerasankara' hybrid (WCT × COD) is a cross between a 'West Coast Tall' (WCT) female parent and a 'Chowghat Orange Dwarf' (COD) male parent.

Dwarf coconuts have also been crossed with the niu leka coconuts, the first of which was a cross between a 'Malayan Red Dwarf' and a niu leka in Fiji in 1928.

== List of cultivars by country ==
The following are a list of Dwarf cultivars by country of origin, including international accepted abbreviations and specific regions they originate from, where applicable:

=== Bangladesh ===
Dwarf coconut cultivars from Bangladesh include:

- 'Chinashkhania Dwarf' (CHNSD) - Gazipur District

=== Brazil ===
Dwarf coconut cultivars from Brazil include:

- 'Brazilian Green Dwarf' (BGD) - Rio Grande do Norte
- 'Brazilian Red Dwarf' (BRD) - Paraiba

=== Cambodia ===
Dwarf coconut cultivars from Cambodia include:

- 'Cambodian Green Dwarf' (KGD)

=== Cameroon ===
Dwarf coconut cultivars from Cameroon include:

- 'Cameroon Red Dwarf' (CRD)

=== Cuba ===
Dwarf coconut cultivars from Cuba include:

- 'Cuban Orange Dwarf'(CUD)

=== Equatorial Guinea ===
Dwarf coconut cultivars from Equatorial Guinea include:

- 'Equatorial Guinea Green Dwarf' (EGD)

=== Federated States of Micronesia ===
Dwarf coconut cultivars from the Federated States of Micronesia include:

- 'Short Yellow Dwarf'

=== French Polynesia ===
Dwarf coconut cultivars from French Polynesia include:

- 'Rangiroa Red Dwarf' (RRD)
- 'Tahitian Red Dwarf' (TRD) - Tahiti

=== Ghana ===
Dwarf coconut cultivars from Ghana include:

- 'Ghana Yellow Dwarf' (GYD)

=== India ===
Dwarf coconut cultivars from India include:

- 'Annur' (ANR) - Kannur, Kerala
- 'Andaman Green Dwarf' (ANGD) - Andaman Islands
- 'Andaman Yellow Dwarf' (ANYD) - Andaman Islands
- 'Chowghat Green Dwarf' (CGD) - Kerala
- 'Chowghat Orange Dwarf' (COD) - Tamil Nadu
- 'Gangabondam Green Dwarf' (GBGD)
- 'Gudanjali Green Dwarf' (GDD) - Gujarat
- 'Kenthali Orange Dwarf' (KTOD) - Karnataka
- 'Kulasekharam Green Dwarf' (KGD)
- 'Kulasekharam Orange Dwarf' (KOD)
- 'Kulasekharam Yellow Dwarf' (KYD)
- 'Laccadive Orange Dwarf' (LCOD) - Lakshadweep Islands

=== Indonesia ===
Dwarf coconut cultivars from Indonesia include:

- 'Bali Green Dwarf' (BGD) - Bali
- 'Bali Yellow Dwarf' (BYD) - Bali
- 'Jombang Green Dwarf' (JGD) - East Java
- 'Jombang Red Dwarf' (JORD) - East Java
- 'Jombang Yellow Dwarf' (JYD) - Central Java
- 'Kebumen Entok Dwarf' (KED)
- 'Kopyor Green Dwarf' (KGD)
- 'Kopyor Yellow Dwarf' (KYD)
- 'Kopyor Brown Dwarf' (KBD)
- 'Nias Green Dwarf' (NGD)
- 'Nias Yellow Dwarf' (NYD)
- 'Pandan Wangi Dwarf' (PWD)
- 'Raja Brown Dwarf' (RBD) - West Java
- 'Sagerat Orange Dwarf' (SOD) - North Sulawesi
- 'Salak Green Dwarf' (SGD) - West Java
- 'Shinta Red Dwarf' (SHRD)
- 'Soasio Red Dwarf' (SORD) - North Maluku
- 'Sri Tanjung Dwarf' (STD) - East Java
- 'Tebing Tinggi Dwarf' (TTD) - North Sumatra
- 'Ternate Brown Dwarf' (TBD) - Maluku
- 'Trenggalek Dwarf' (TGKD) - East Java

=== Jamaica ===
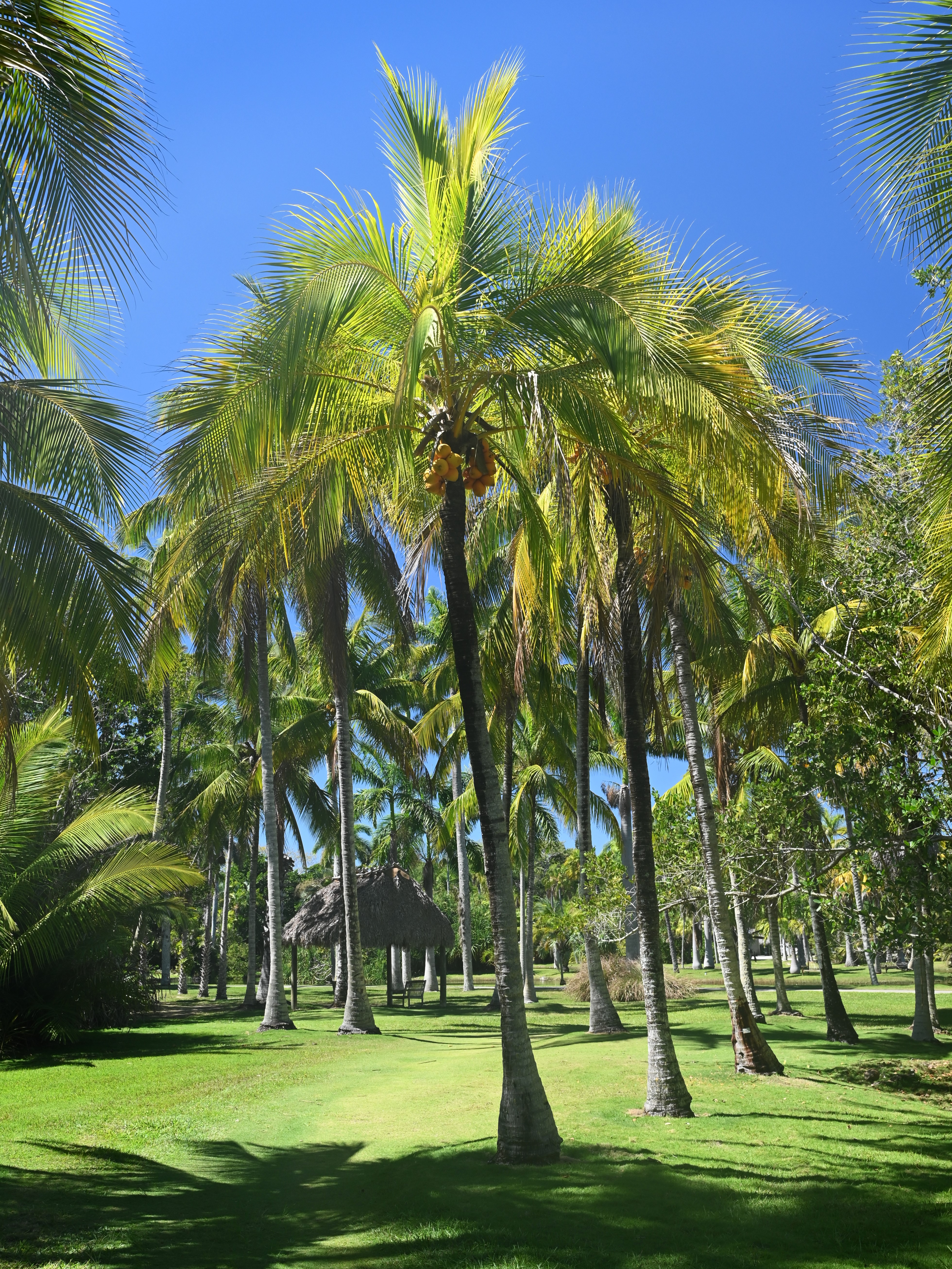
'Red Spicata Dwarf' in Florida, originally developed in Jamaica

Dwarf coconut cultivars from Jamaica include:

- 'Red Spicata Dwarf'

=== Kiribati ===
Dwarf coconut cultivars from Kiribati include:

- 'Kiribati Green Dwarf' (KIGD)

=== Malaysia ===
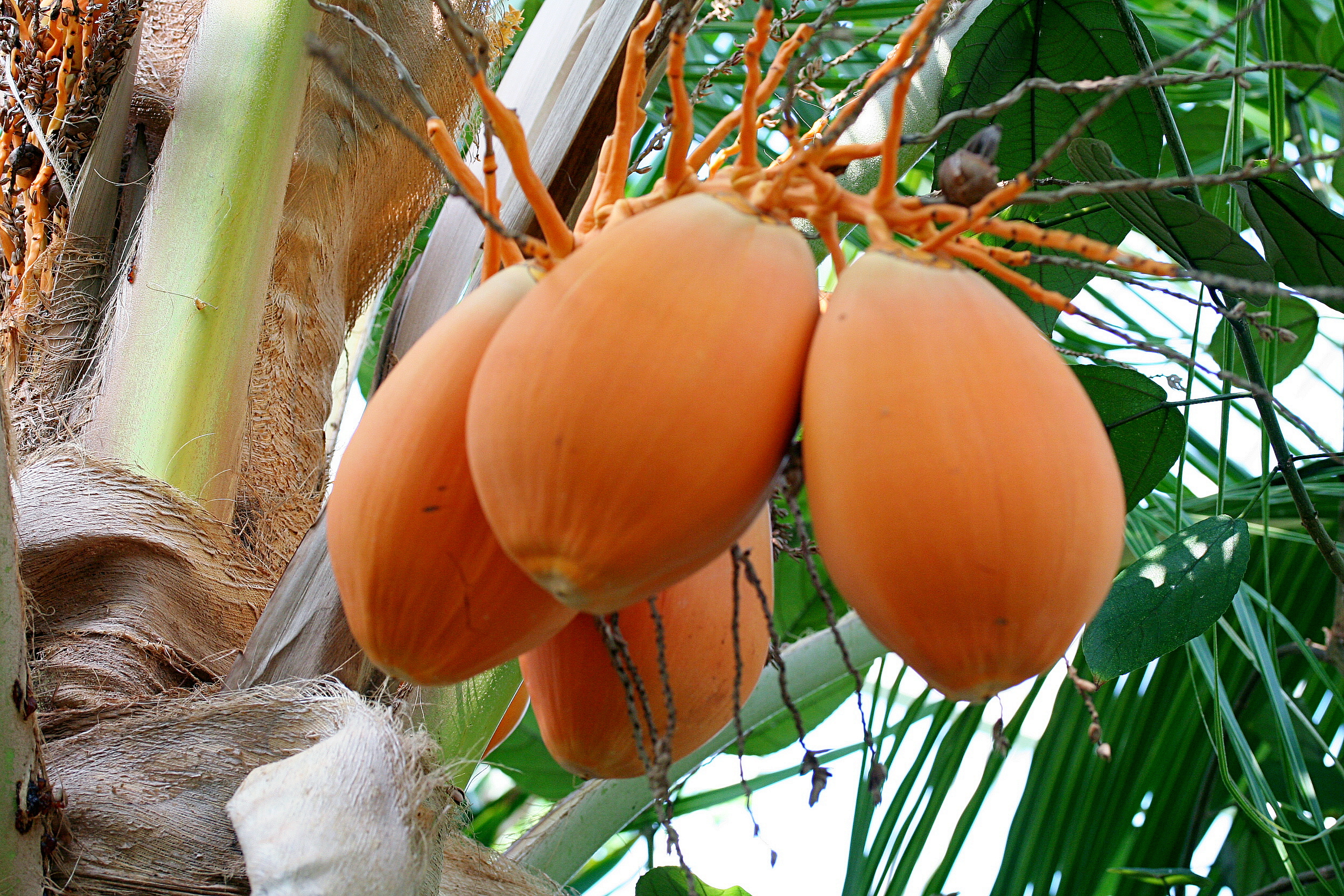
'Malayan Red Dwarf' from Malaysia

Dwarf coconut cultivars from Malaysia include:

- 'Malayan Bronze Dwarf'
- 'Malayan Green Dwarf' (MGD)
- 'Malayan Red Dwarf' (MRD)
- 'Malayan Yellow Dwarf' (MYD)

=== Marshall Islands ===
Dwarf coconut cultivars from the Marshall Islands include:

- 'Marshall Islands Green Dwarf' (MIGD)

=== Nicaragua ===
Dwarf coconut cultivars from the Nicaragua include:

- 'Nicaragua Green Dwarf (NICD)

=== Nigeria ===
Dwarf coconut cultivars from the Nigeria include:

- 'Nigerian Dwarf' or 'NIFOR Dwarf'

=== Palau ===
Dwarf coconut cultivars from the Palau include:

- 'Tobi Emadech Brown Dwarf'
- 'Tobi Emadech Green Dwarf'
- 'Tobi Erilech Green Dwarf'

=== Papua New Guinea ===
Dwarf coconut cultivars from Papua New Guinea include:

- 'Iokea Red Dwarf' (IRD)
- 'Madang Brown Dwarf' (MBD)
- 'New Guinea Orange Dwarf' (NGOD) - New Ireland
- 'PNG Yellow Dwarf' (PYD)
- 'Rabaul Red Dwarf' (RARD) - East New Britain

=== Philippines ===
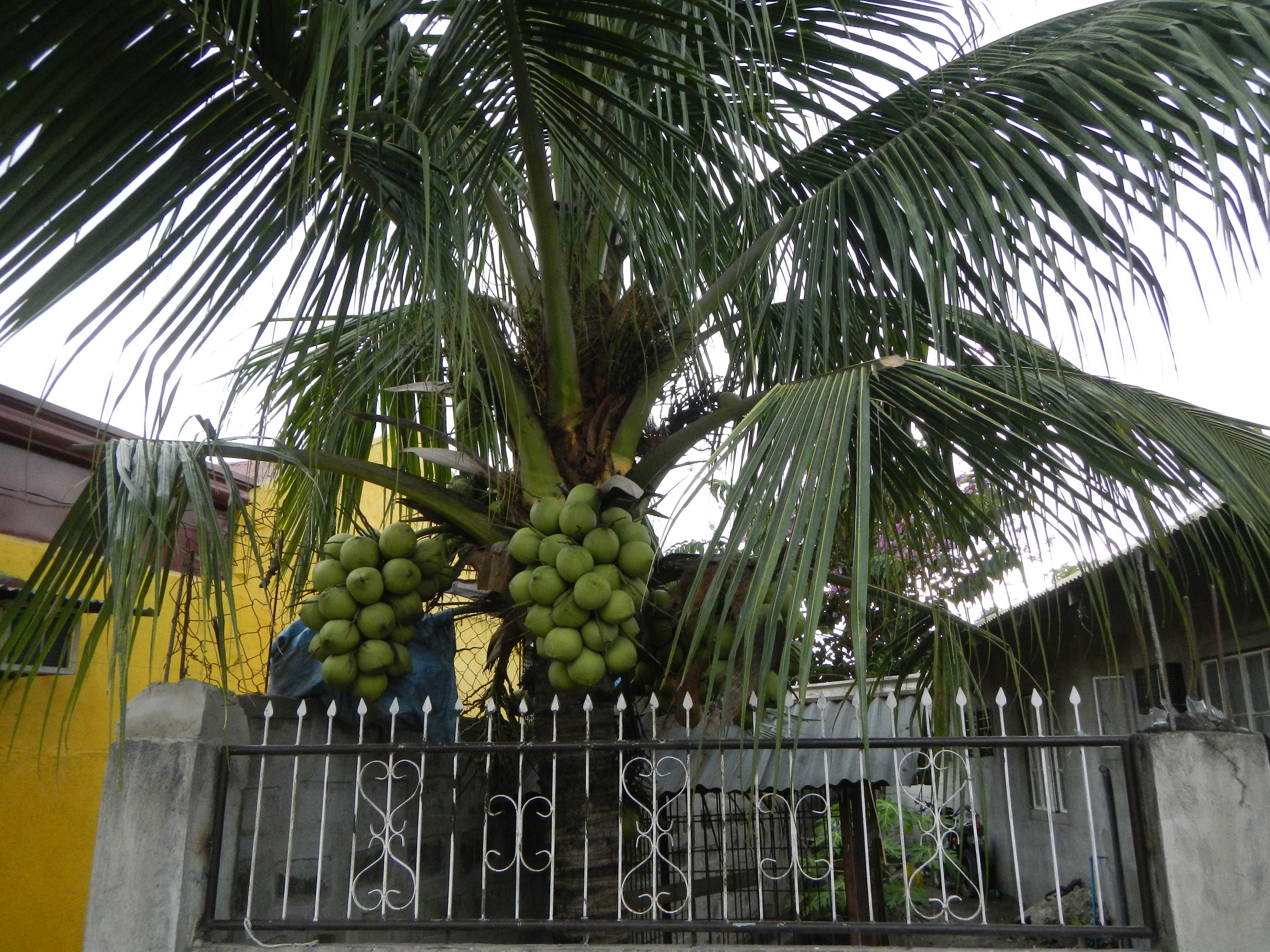
'Catigan Green Dwarf' from the Philippines

Dwarf coconut cultivars from the Philippines include:

- 'Baguer Green Dwarf' (BAGD) - Mindanao
- 'Banga Dwarf' (BAND) - Mindanao
- 'Catigan Green Dwarf' (CATD) - Catigan, Davao City, Mindanao
- 'Galas Green Dwarf' (GALD) - Mindanao
- 'Guiuan Green Dwarf' (GUID) - Eastern Samar
- 'Kapatagan Dwarf' (KAPD) - Mindanao
- 'Kinabalan Green Dwarf' (KIND) - Davao del Sur, Mindanao
- 'La Victoria Dwarf' (VICD) - Zamboanga del Sur, Mindanao
- 'La Victoria Brown Dwarf' (VICD02) - Mindanao
- 'La Victoria Green Dwarf' (VICD01) - Mindanao
- 'Magtuod Green Dwarf' (MAGD) - Mindanao
- 'Makilala Green Dwarf' (MAKD) - Mindanao
- 'Mangipod Green Dwarf' (MPGD) - Mindanao
- 'New Buswang Dwarf' (BUSD) - Mindanao
- 'Pilipog Green Dwarf' (PILD) - Pilipog, Cordova, Cebu
- 'San Isidro Green Dwarf' (SNID) - Mindanao
- 'Santa Margarita Green Dwarf' (SMAD) - Western Samar
- 'Santo Niño Green Dwarf' (SNOD) - Mindanao
- 'Talisay Dwarf' (TALD) - Mindanao
- 'Tacunan Green Dwarf' (TACD) - Tacunan, Davao City, Mindanao
- 'Tambulilid Dwarf' - Bicol
- 'Tupi Dwarf' (TUPD) - Mindanao

=== Samoa ===
Dwarf coconut cultivars from Samoa include:

- 'Samoan Green Dwarf' (SGD)
- 'Samoan Red Dwarf' (SRD)
- 'Samoan Yellow Dwarf' (SYD) - Tutuila Island

=== Solomon Islands ===
Dwarf coconut cultivars from the Solomon Islands include:

- 'Fiami Red Dwarf' (FMD)
- 'Kukum Dwarf'
- 'Kira Kira Red Dwarf'

=== Sri Lanka ===
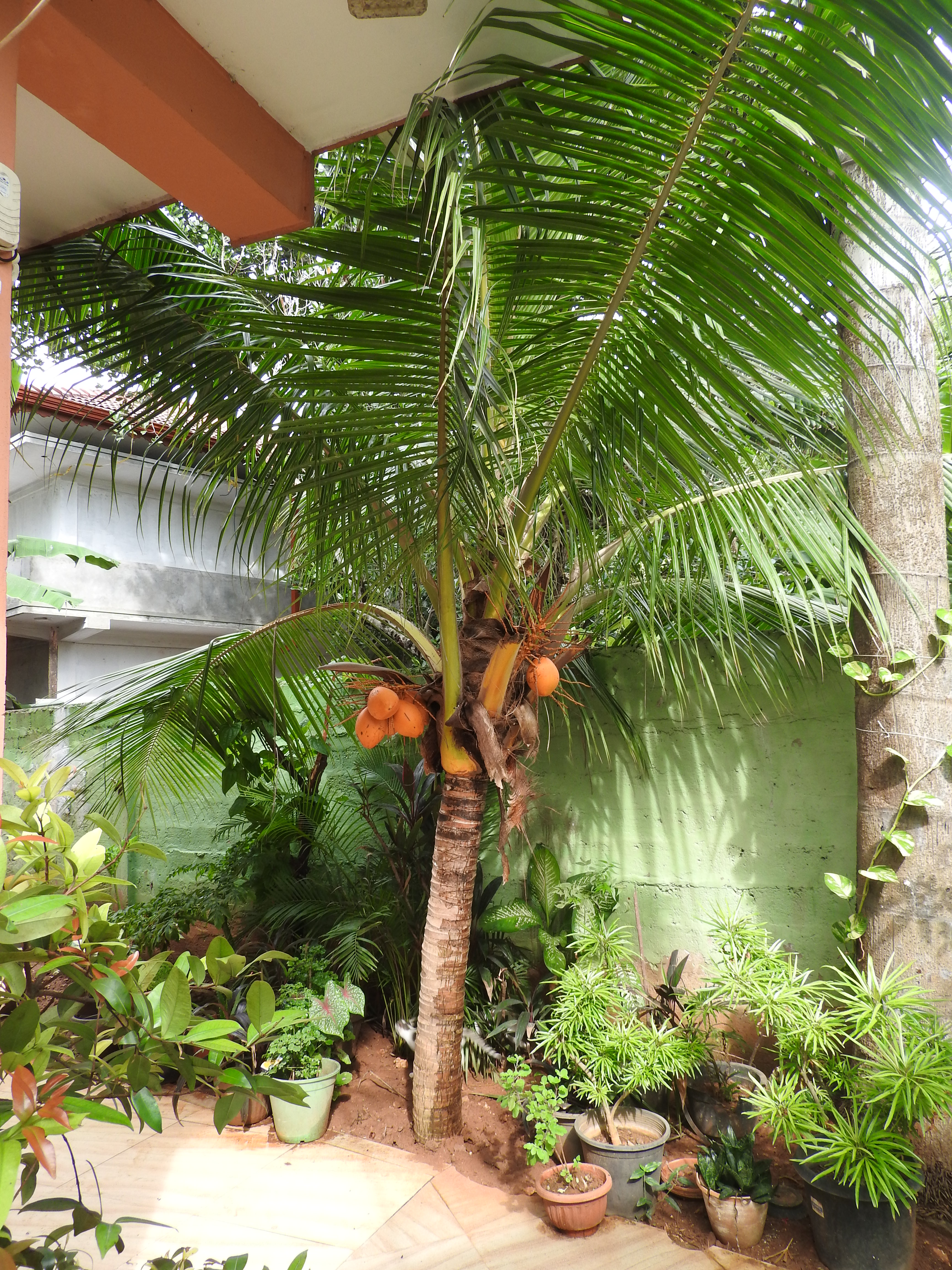
'King Coconut' from Sri Lanka

Dwarf coconut cultivars from Sri Lanka include:

- 'King Coconut' or 'Ran Thambili' (RTB)
- 'Pumila Green Dwarf' or 'Sri Lanka Green Dwarf' (PGD)

=== Suriname ===
Dwarf coconut cultivars from Suriname include:

- 'Suriname Brown Dwarf' (SUBD)

=== Tanzania ===
Dwarf coconut cultivars from Tanzania include:

- 'Pemba Red Dwarf' (PRD)

=== Thailand ===
Dwarf coconut cultivars from Thailand include:

- 'Aromatic Green Dwarf' or 'Nam Hom' (AROD) - Nakhon Pathom
- 'Pathiu Dwarf' (PTID)
- 'Nok Koom Green Dwarf' (NKMD) - Chumphon
- 'Thailand Brown Dwarf' (THBD) - Chumphon
- 'Thailand Green Dwarf' (THD) - Prachuap Khiri Khan
- 'Thailand Orange Dwarf Chumphon' (THOD01) - Chumphon
- 'Thailand Orange Dwarf Prachuap' (THOD02) - Prachuap Khiri Khan
- 'Thailand Yellow Dwarf' (MSLD) - Chumphon
- 'Thung Kled Green Dwarf' (TKD) - Prachuap Khiri Khan

=== Vanuatu ===
Dwarf coconut cultivars from Vanuatu include:

- 'Vanuatu Red Dwarf' (VRD)

=== Vietnam ===
Dwarf coconut cultivars from Vietnam include:

- 'Eo Brown Dwarf' (EOD) - Ho Chi Minh City
- 'Tam Quan Yellow Dwarf' (TQYD/TYD) - Tien Giang
- 'Xiem Green Dwarf' (XGD) - Ben Tre

== Niu leka ==
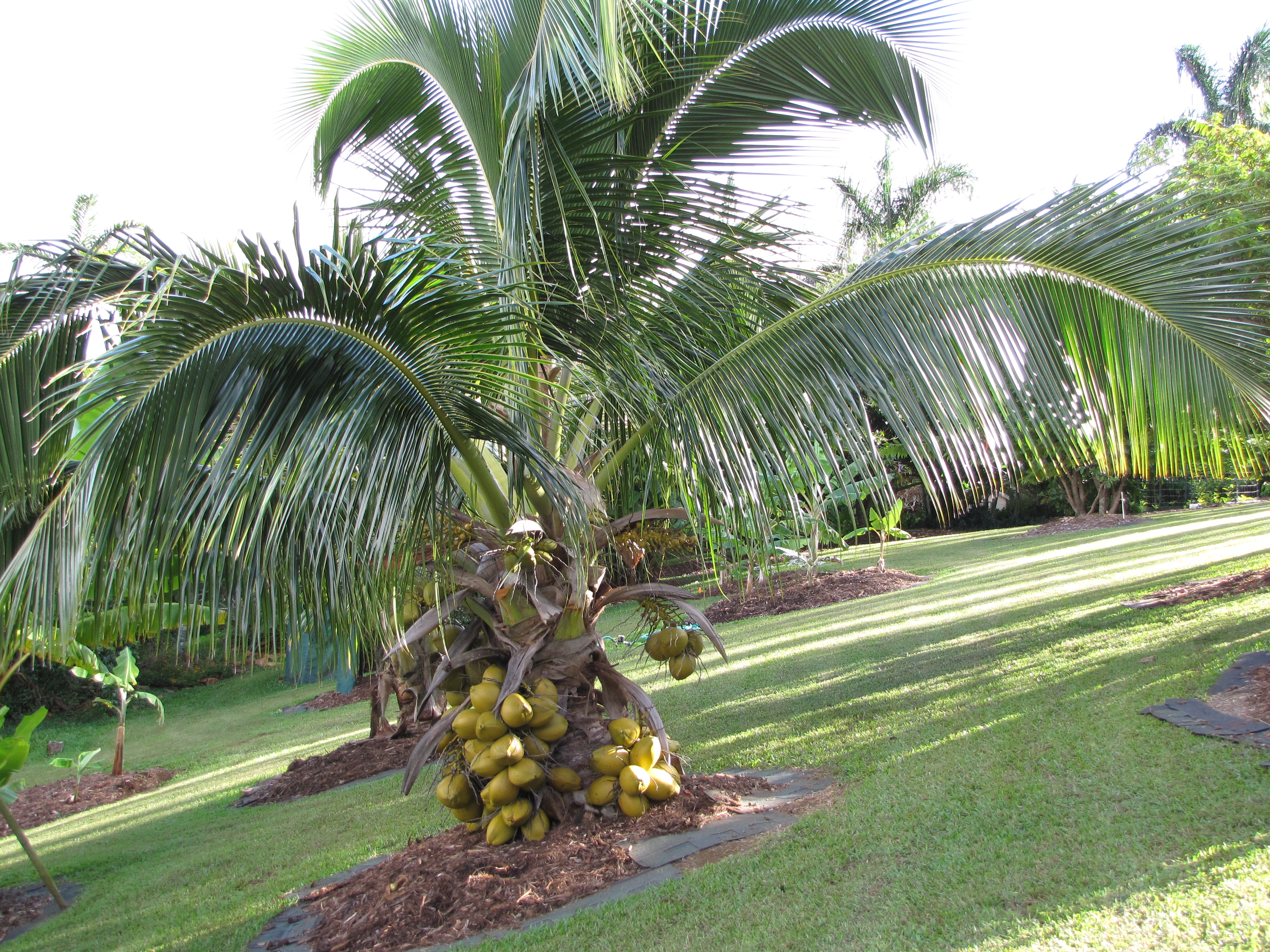
A niu leka cultivar in Pali o Waipio, Maui. The plant Musa can be visible in the background

The niu leka cultivars (NLAD) of Polynesia, also called 'Fiji Dwarf' or 'Compact Dwarf', are also sometimes classified as Dwarf coconuts due to similarities in habit. But they are genetically distinct and were independently domesticated, likely in Tonga. They differ from true Dwarf coconuts in that they are not self-pollinated. Other cultivars of niu leka may exist in other islands of the Pacific, and some are probably descendants of advanced crosses between niu leka and Southeast Asian Dwarf types.

== See also ==
- Dwarfing
- Domesticated plants and animals of Austronesia
