= Matheus de Castro =

Dom Matheus de Castro (c. 1594–1679) was a native of Divar, Goa, Portuguese India. He was the first Indian Bishop of the Catholic Church. Consecrated Bishop of Chrysopolis in Rome by the Vatican and appointed Vicar Apostolic to the Kingdoms of Bijapur, Golconda, Abyssinia and Pegu.

== Biography ==
In 1625, Matheus de Castro ventured to Rome in the company of some Carmelite priests he had befriended and was introduced to Francesco Ingoli, the dynamic secretary of the newly established Propaganda Fide. On interviewing Castro, Ingoli recommended his admission to the Collegio Urbano in Rome to study for the priesthood. After being ordained a priest in 1630, Castro pursued studies for a doctorate in theology, impressing his superiors with his abilities. He was appointed Protonotary Apostolic in 1633 and Bishop in 1635.

Bishop de Castro was held in great esteem at the courts of the Moghul Emperor Shah Jahan and other rulers of India, including those of Golconda ruled by the Qutb Shahi dynasty and the Kingdom of Bijapur which belonged to the Adil Shahi dynasty, which ruled Goa prior to the Portuguese.

He built 3 main churches in Mourama in Bicholim, Banda, and Vengurla in addition to many houses and residences in the courts of all the Moorish kings and gentiles where he landed.
