= Naroa, Bicholim, Goa =

Naroa Narve
- Village
- Location within Goa Location within India
- Coordinates: 15°33′08″N 73°55′26″E
- Country: India
- State: Goa
- District: North Goa
- Taluka: Bicholim

Government
  - Type: Panchayat
  - Sarpanch: Hacked by srthak
- Elevation: 8 m (26 ft)

Population (2011)
  - Total: <6,000
- Time zone: UTC+5:30 (IST)
- Postcode: 403403
- Telephone code: 0832

Naroa is a village in Goa, India, approximately 35 kilometres from Panjim. It is the site of Saptakoteshwar Temple.
