= King coconut =

Variety of coconut

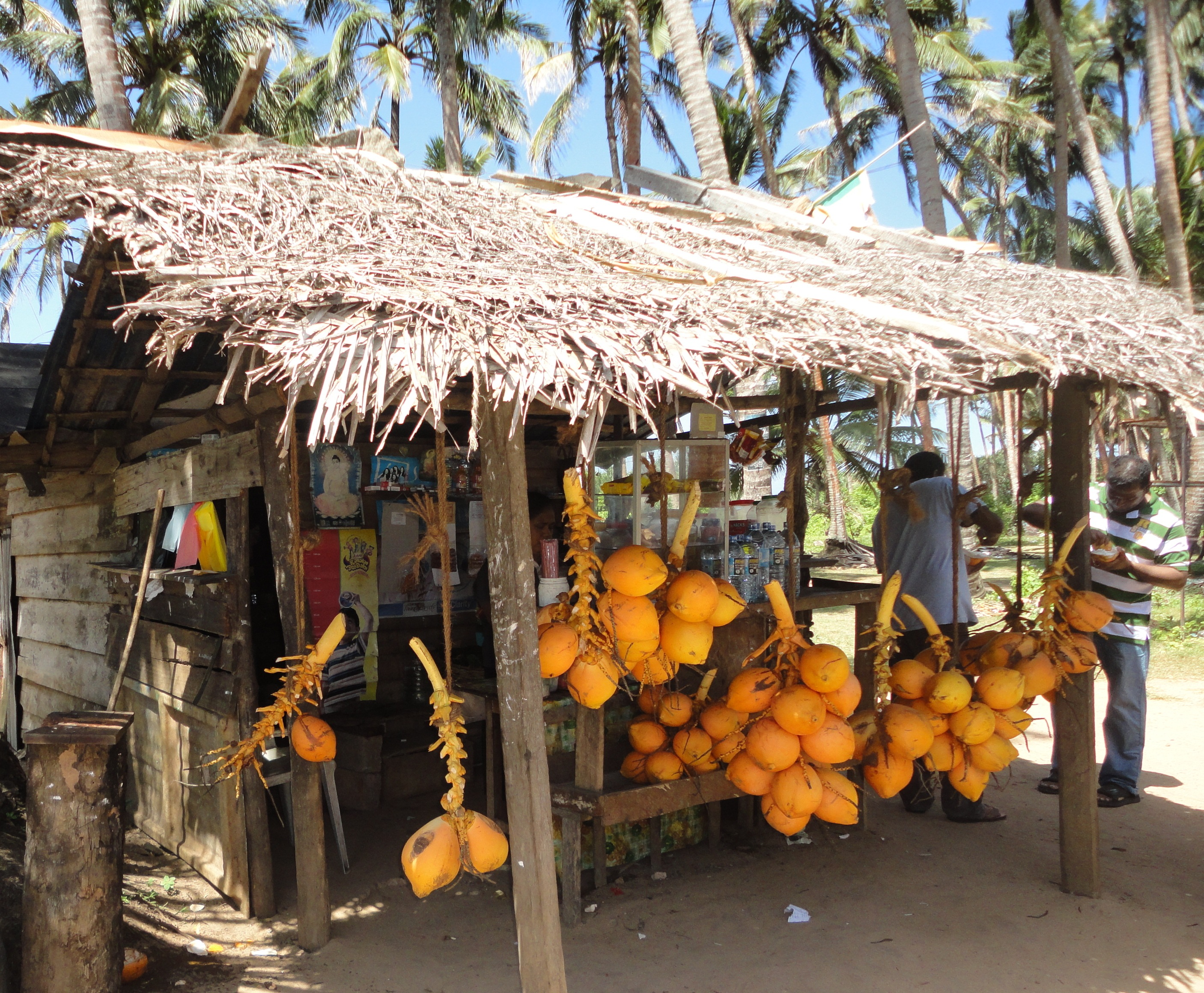
Thembili kiosk by a main road in Sri Lanka

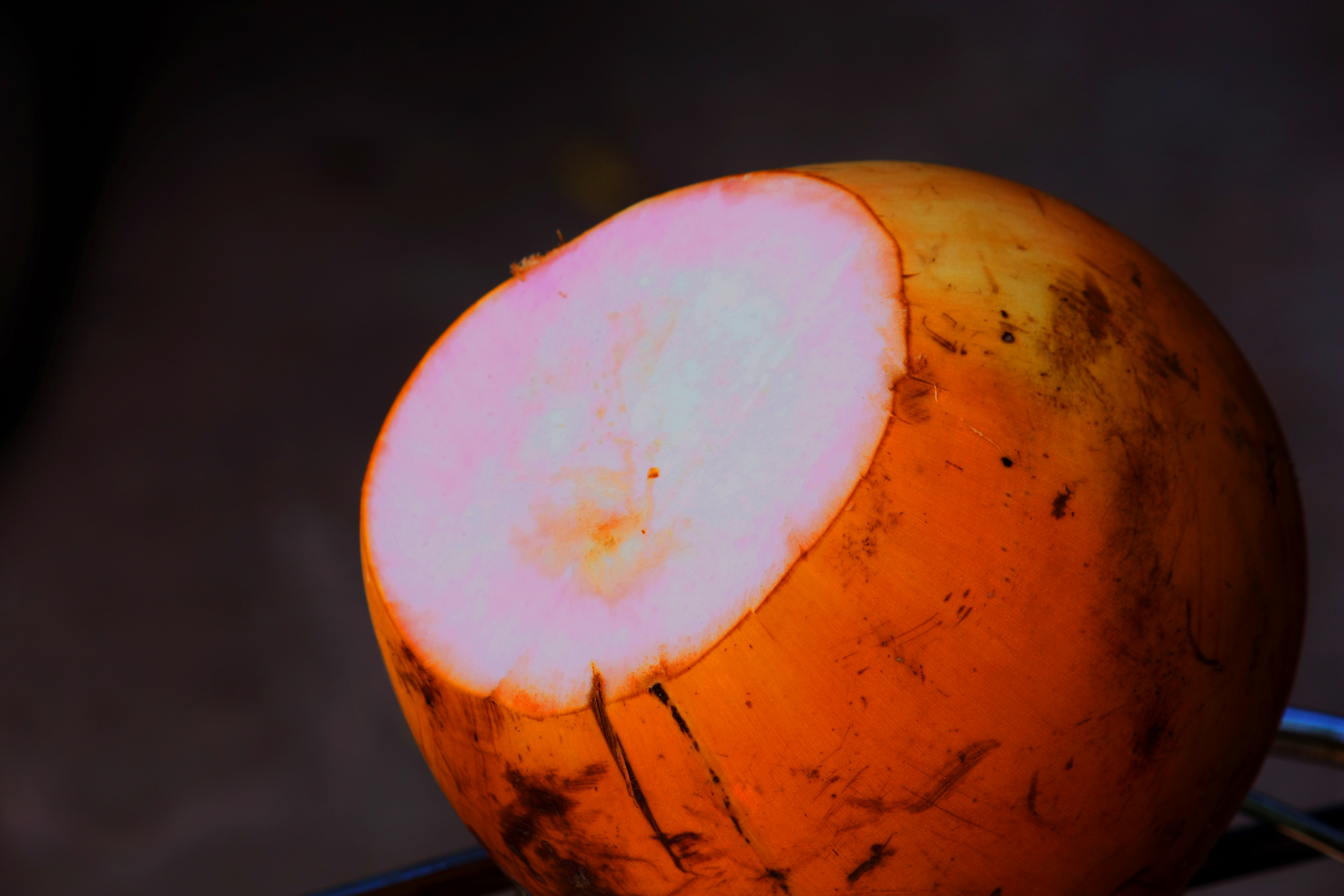
Red king coconut, a rare variety/form that has pink-color under epicarp.

King coconut is a dwarf coconut cultivar native to Sri Lanka, where it is known as Thæmbili (Sinhala: තැඹිලි) also found in India and Indonesia. It has less sugar content than other coconuts. There are several sub-varieties of the king coconut, the most common being the "red dwarf" (kaha thæmbili, commonly referred to as gon thæmbili). The other variety is "Ran Thæmbili", a smaller variety containing about forty nuts in a bunch. The king coconut tree is a shorter variety, and is commonly found growing wild in many areas of the country.

The king coconut water, the liquid endosperm of young coconuts, is a nutritious beverage rich in sugars (mainly reducing sugars), minerals (mainly K+), vitamins (mainly B & C) and amino acids.

Sri Lanka now exports packaged king coconut water in a variety of brands.

== Varieties and forms of coconut found in Sri Lanka ==
Varieties in Sri Lanka include:

Common name	Variety/form	Resembles	Features
Sri Lanka Tall	Typica/Typical		Tall stature, allogamous, heterogeneous, flowers in 6–7 years, medium-sized nuts, 20–25 nuts per bunch, 60––80 nuts per palm per year.
Gon Thæmbili	Typica/Gon Thæmbili	Sri Lanka Tall	Ivory-coloured nuts, petioles, and inflorescences.
Nawasi	Typica/Nawasi	Sri Lanka Tall	Soft mesocarp edible in the immature nut. Yields soft fibre when mature.
Pora pol	Typica/Pora pol	Sri Lanka Tall	Remarkably thick-shelled nuts
Ran Thæmbili	Typica/Ran thæmbili	Sri Lanka Tall	Pink-coloured mesocarp in immature fruit and a pink whorl under the perianth. Large nuts
Kamandala	Typica/Kamandala	Sri Lanka Tall	Large-sized nuts largest among local forms, and few nuts per bunch 2–5 nuts per bunch.
Bodiri	Typica/Bodiri	Sri Lanka Tall	Small-sized nuts, and large number per bunch 30–100 nuts per bunch. Seasonal nut production.
Dikiri	Typica/Dikiri	Sri Lanka Tall	Some nuts contain a jelly-like endosperm. Generally only some nuts in a bunch of coconuts are like this and the rest are normal coconuts.
King Coconut	Aurantiaca/King coconut		Intermediate stature, autogamous, homogeneous, fruits in 6–7 years, seasonal flower production, medium-sized nuts with orange epicarp, and sweet nut water; 25–50 nuts per bunch.
Nawasi Thæmbili	Aurantiaca/Nawasi thæmbili	King Coconut	Similar to King Coconut. Soft and edible mesocarp like Nawasi.
Rath / Ran Thæmbili	Aurantiaca/Rath / Ran thæmbili	King Coconut	Pink-coloured mesocarp, and a pink whorl under the perianth.
Bothal Thæmbili	Aurantiaca/Bothal thæmbili	King Coconut	Bottle shaped nuts.
Green Dwarf / Kundira	Nana/Green dwarf or Pumila		Dwarf stature, autogamous, homogeneous, fruits in 3–4 years, small-sized nuts with green epicarp. Low copra content, 80–150 nuts per palm per year.
Yellow Dwarf / Kundira	Nana/Yellow dwarf or Eburnea	Green dwarf	Nuts with yellow epicarp.
Red Dwarf / Kundira	Nana/Red dwarf or Regia	Green dwarf	Nuts with red epicarp.
Brown Dwarf / Kundira	Nana/Brown dwarf or Braune	Green dwarf	Nuts with brown epicarp.

== See also ==
- Coconut
