= Fort Naroa =

Naroa Fort
- Part of Goa
- Ilha de Piedade, India
- The Holy Spirit Chapel is the only standing remnant of the former fortress

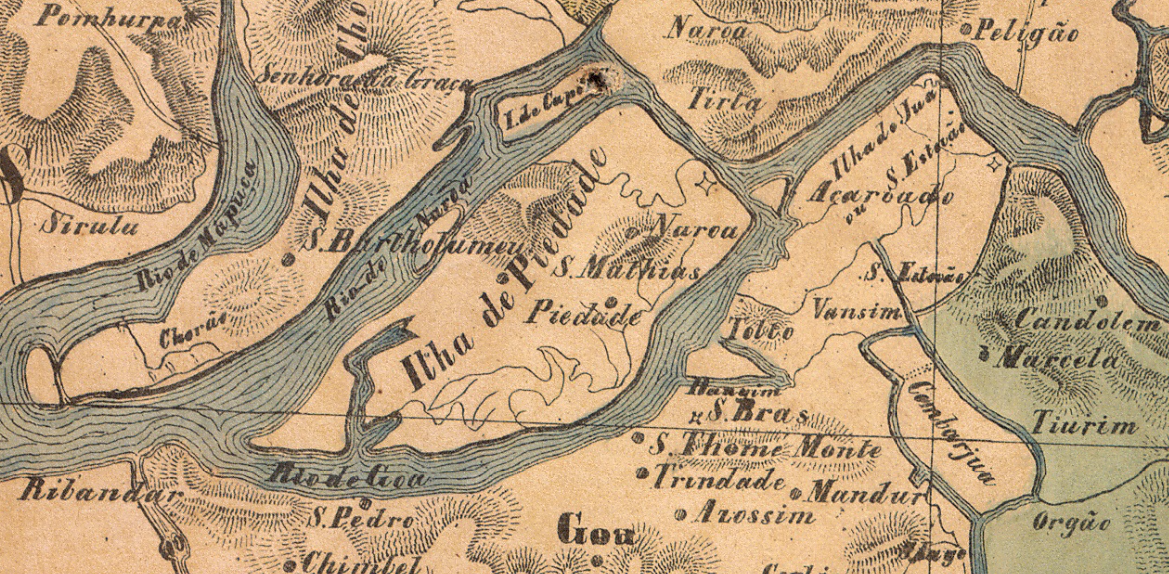
- Location of Forte de Naroa in Ilha de Piedade

Site information
- Type: Fort
- Owner: Government of Goa
- Controlled by: India
- Open to the public: Yes
- Condition: Ruins

Location
- Coordinates of the ruins Naroa Fort (India)
- Coordinates: 15.537950°N 73.922409°E
- Height: 10 m

Site history
- Built: 1500s
- Built by: unknown
- Materials: Laterite stones and mud
- Demolished: Yes
- Battles/wars: unknown
- Events: Abandoned in 1834

Garrison information
- Current commander: Diogo da Silveira (1710)
- Garrison: n/a
- Occupants: none

Fort Naroa was situated on the eastern tip of the Island of Divar, on the Ilhas de Goa (Goan islands) near the old capital of Goa, in the Velhas Conquistas. It was originally built as a military camp by the Deccan sultanates in the 1500s. After its capture by the Portuguese, it was rebuilt and reinforced to protect the eastern border against the Bijapur Sultanate. After the incorporation of the Novas Conquistas regions, the fort lost its sole and primary purpose and it was subsequently abandoned by1834 to now be in ruins.

Today, the Fort exists only as a wall of about 10–12 meters in length and about 6 meters high. A unique feature that can be seen on this wall is a semi-circular protrusion, facing a window of the church across the road, which may once have been a small balcony, – enough for a single person to stand.

== Chapel ==
The Holy Spirit church is all that remains from the fort. A Captain of the Fort, Diogo da Silveira is said to have constructed the church in 1710. Though this church is today popularly known as the Holy Spirit Church of Naroa, Divar, the icon of the St Thomas the Apostle adorns the central part of the main altar.
