= Piedade, Goa =

Piedade Goltim-Navelim
- Village
- Nossa Senhora da Piedade Igreja, Piedade

- Location within Goa Location within India
- Coordinates: 15°32′43.6″N 73°54′44.3″E
- Country: India
- State: Goa
- District: North Goa
- Taluka: Ilhas
- Named for: Our Lady of Piety

Government
  - Type: Panchayat
  - Sarpanch: Manuel Niclau Azavedo
- Elevation: 8 m (26 ft)

Population (2010)
  - Total: approx. 3,000 to 4,500
- Demonym: Piedadi

Languages
  - Official: Konkani
  - Also spoken (understood): English, Marathi, Hindi
  - Historical: Portuguese

Religions
  - Dominant: Christianity, Hinduism
  - Minor: Islam, Atheism
  - Historical: Roman Catholicism
- Time zone: UTC+5:30 (IST)
- Postcode: 403505
- Telephone code: 08343

Piedade is an island village located in Ilhas (also known as Tiswadi), a northern district in the state of Goa, India, and named after Our Lady of Compassion. The name comes from the Portuguese word piedade, which means "compassion". It lies 23 km east of the state capital, Panjim, between the taluks of Satari (to the north) and Ponda (to the south). Other nearby villages are Amona (3 km), Volvoi (3 km), Surla (4 km), Cudnem (4 km), Betqui, and Candola (5 km).

The local language is Konkani.

== Churches ==
=== Nossa Senhora da Piedade Igreja ===
Church of Our Lady of Compassion and its interior

The Church of Our Lady of Compassion is located in Piedade. It was designed by a Goan priest in the early 18th century, and was the first Christian structure erected there. Also known as Our Lady of Piety.

== Cemeteries ==
Piedade Cemetery, Divar

=== Piedade Cemetery ===
The cemetery is located near the Church of Our Lady of Compassion on the hilltop. Due to a lack of space, many artistic graves have been made here with niches in the walls for burying the dead. It also houses a chapel.

== Schools ==
=== Our Lady of Divar School ===
Our Lady of Divar School, Piedade, Divar

Until the 20th century, the Our Lady of Divar School was the only school in the village. Due its red color, it was called Tambde Escola, or the 'Red School'.

== Government ==
Goltim-Navelim Village Panchayat, Piedade

The village panchayat is located in Goltim-Navelim and is walking distance from the school of Our Lady.

== See also ==
- São Matias
- Divar
