= Bolawatta =

Coordinates: 7°18′N 79°51′E

Bolawatta is a populated place located in Sri Lanka. The location is situated 130 kilometres west (284°) of the approximate center of Sri Lanka and 40 kilometres north (2°) of the capital Colombo. It is located at latitude of 7.29 (7° 17' 25 N) and a longitude of 79.86 (79° 51' 31 E).
