= List of talukas of Goa =

Goa is divided into three districts: North Goa, South Goa, and Kushavati, which are further divided into 12 talukas.

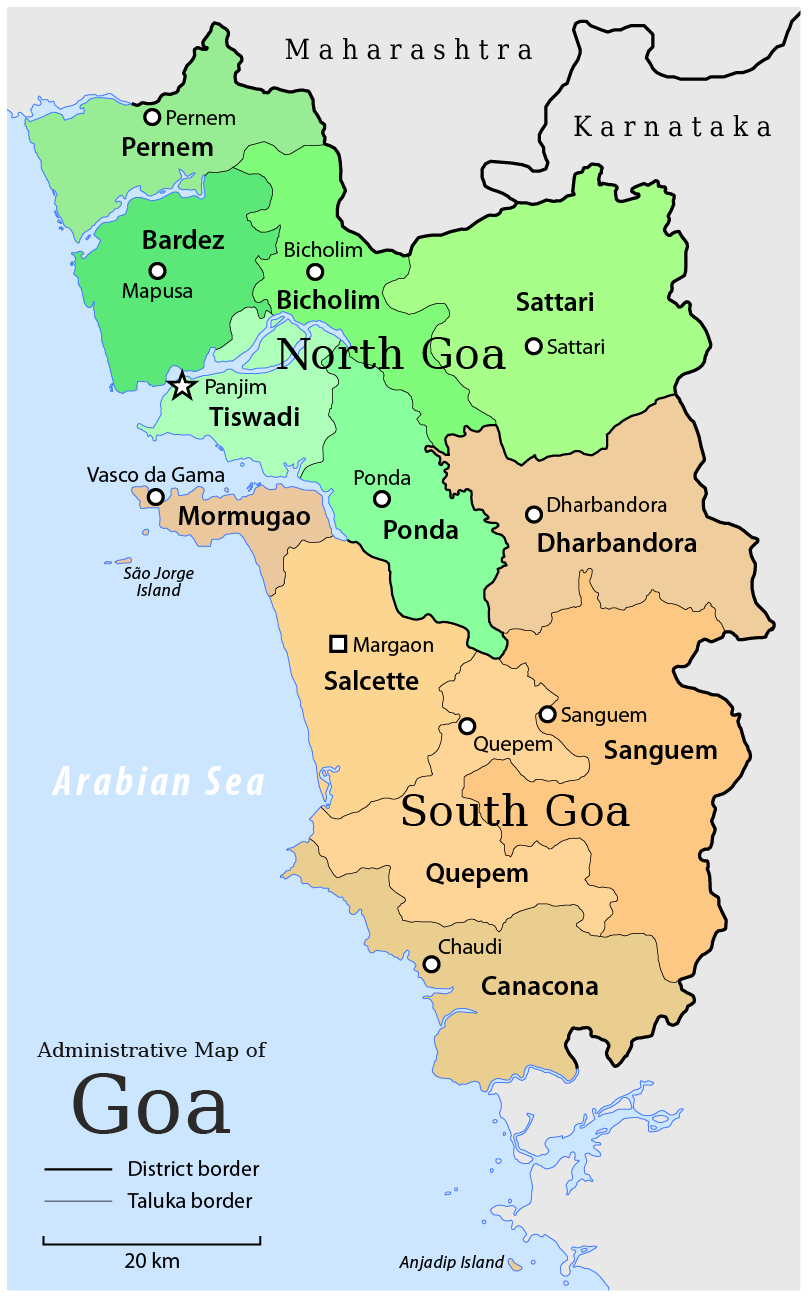
Talukas of Goa

Talukas in the North Goa district:

- Pernem
- Bardez
- Bicholim
- Sattari
- Tiswadi

Talukas in the South Goa district:

- Ponda
- Mormugao
- Salcette

Talukas in the proposed Kushavati district:

- Dharbandora
- Sanguem
- Quepem
- Canacona

== See also ==
- Districts of Goa
