= Vasudev Gaonkar =

Indian politician (born 1961)

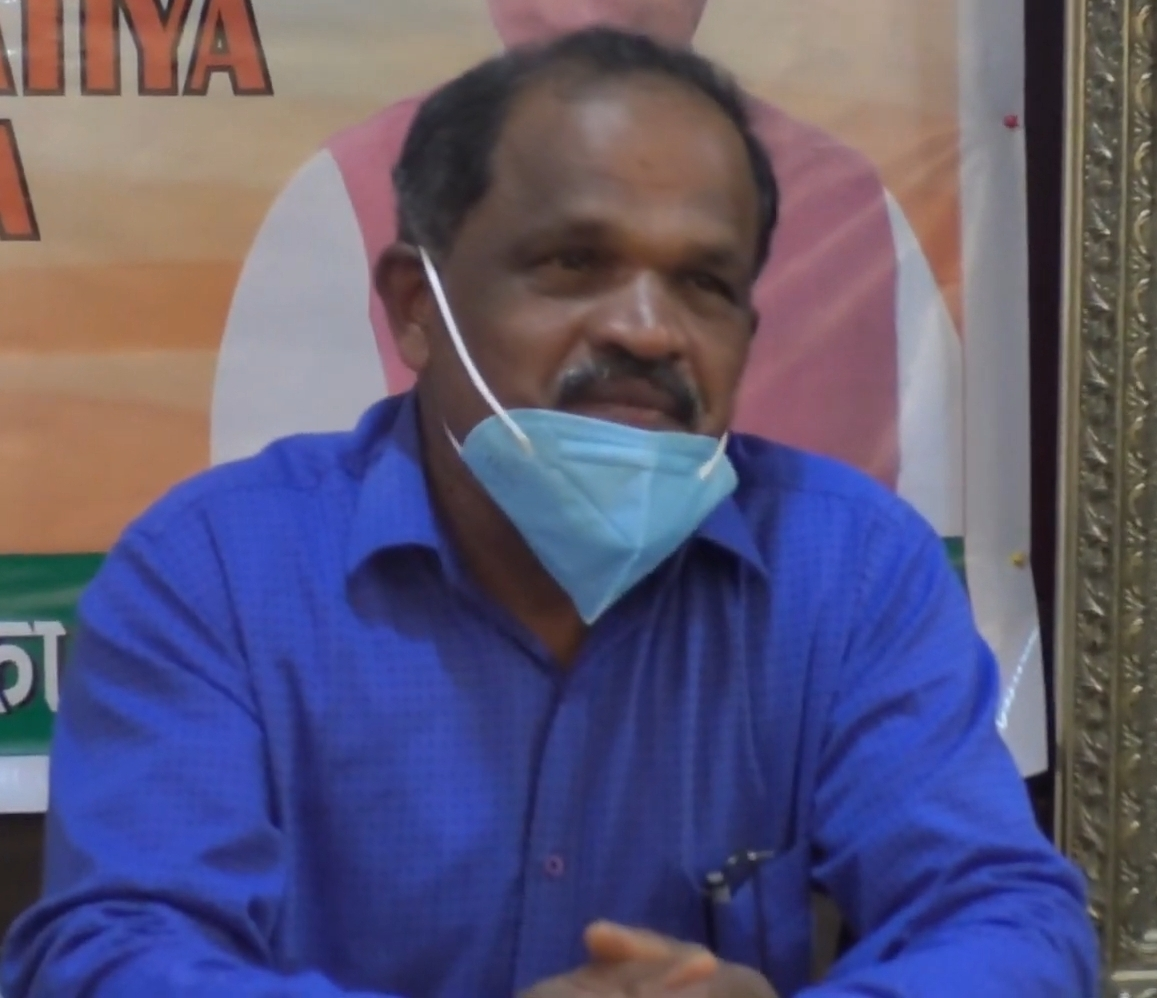
- Gaonkar in December 2020

President of BJP Kisan Morcha Bharatiya Janata Party, Goa
- Incumbent
- Assumed office 4 September 2020
- Chief Minister: Pramod Sawant

Member of Goa Legislative Assembly
- In office 1 June 2002 – 2 March 2012
- Preceded by: Prabhakar Gaonkar
- Succeeded by: Subhash Phal Desai
- Constituency: Sanguem
- Majority: 5,747 (43.46%) (Note: for the year 2002–2007; followed by the next term.); 7,754

Personal details
- Born: Vasudev Meng Gaonkar; 16 February 1961 (age 65) Curdi, Goa, Portuguese India, Portuguese Empire (now in India)
- Party: Bharatiya Janata Party (2002–2012) (2020–present)
- Other political affiliations: Independent (2012–2017); Maharashtrawadi Gomantak Party (2017–2020)
- Spouse: Vanita Gaonkar
- Children: 2
- Education: Government Industrial Training Institute, Curchorem
- Committees: Government Assurances; Delegated Legislation; Library; Public Undertakings; Panel of Presiding Members; Privileges; Budget; Agriculture and Forests

Vasudev Meng Gaonkar (born 16 February 1961) (Note: his first name, Vasudev is also spelled as Vasudeo according to) is an Indian politician. He is a former member of the Goa Legislative Assembly, representing the Sanguem Assembly constituency from 2002 to 2012. He is the current serving president of the BJP Kisan Morcha in the Government of Goa.

== Early and personal life ==
Vasudev Meng Gaonkar was born at Curdi, Goa to Meng Shambu Gaonkar and Parvati Meng Gaonkar, he belongs to the scheduled tribe community. He completed his Secondary School Certificate from Sacred Heart of Jesus High School, Curdi in 1982.

Gaonkar has also completed a course in diesel mechanic from Government Industrial Training Institute, Curchorem in 1984. He is married to Vanita Gaonkar, the couple has two children.

== Career ==
Gaonkar was a ten-year term member of the Goa Legislative Assembly. He first contested in the 2002 Goa Legislative Assembly election from Sanguem Assembly constituency on the Bharatiya Janata Party (BJP) ticket and emerged victorious. He defeated Indian National Congress (INC) candidate, Satyawan Bhadru Dessai by a margin of 837 votes. He then successfully contested in the 2007 Goa Legislative Assembly election from the same consistency on the BJP ticket, he lost to INC candidate, Minguelino D'Costa by a margin of 2,305 votes.

On 3 January 2017, Gaonkar quit the BJP party to join the Maharashtrawadi Gomantak Party (MGP) due to not being "respected as a senior partyman" even after he was denied the party ticket ahead of the 2012 Goa Legislative Assembly election, Gaonkar stated that the BJP party had "cold shouldered" him, despite his contribution in the party's victory in the 2012 election. He next unsuccessfully contested in the 2017 Goa Legislative Assembly election from the Sanguem constituency on the MGP ticket and lost to Independent candidate, Prasad Gaonkar by a margin of 7,152 votes.

In August 2020, Gaonkar quit MGP after serving for more than three years to join the BJP party. On 4 September 2020, he was elected as the president of Goa BJP Kisan Morcha at the presence of Goa BJP President, Sadanand Tanavade.

== Positions held ==
- Member of Committee on Government Assurances (2002–2003)
- Member of Committee on Delegated Legislation (2002–2003)
- Member of Library Committee (2002–2003)
- Member of Committee on Public Undertakings (2002–2003)
- Member of Committee on Panel of Presiding Members (July 2007 – 2012)
- Member of Privileges Committee (September 2007 – 2012)
- Member of Budget Committee (September 2007 – 2012)
- Member of Demands related Ad hoc Committee on Agriculture and Forests (April 2008–August 2008)
- Member of Demands related Ad hoc Committee on Agriculture and Forests (27 April 2009 – 2012)
- Member of Budget Committee (9 September 2009 – 2012)
- Member of Panel of Presiding Members (9 September 2009 – 2012)
- Member of Committee of Privileges (9 September 2009 – 2012)
