= Sanguem taluka =

Sanguem Konkani: Sannge Portuguese: Sanguém
- Taluka
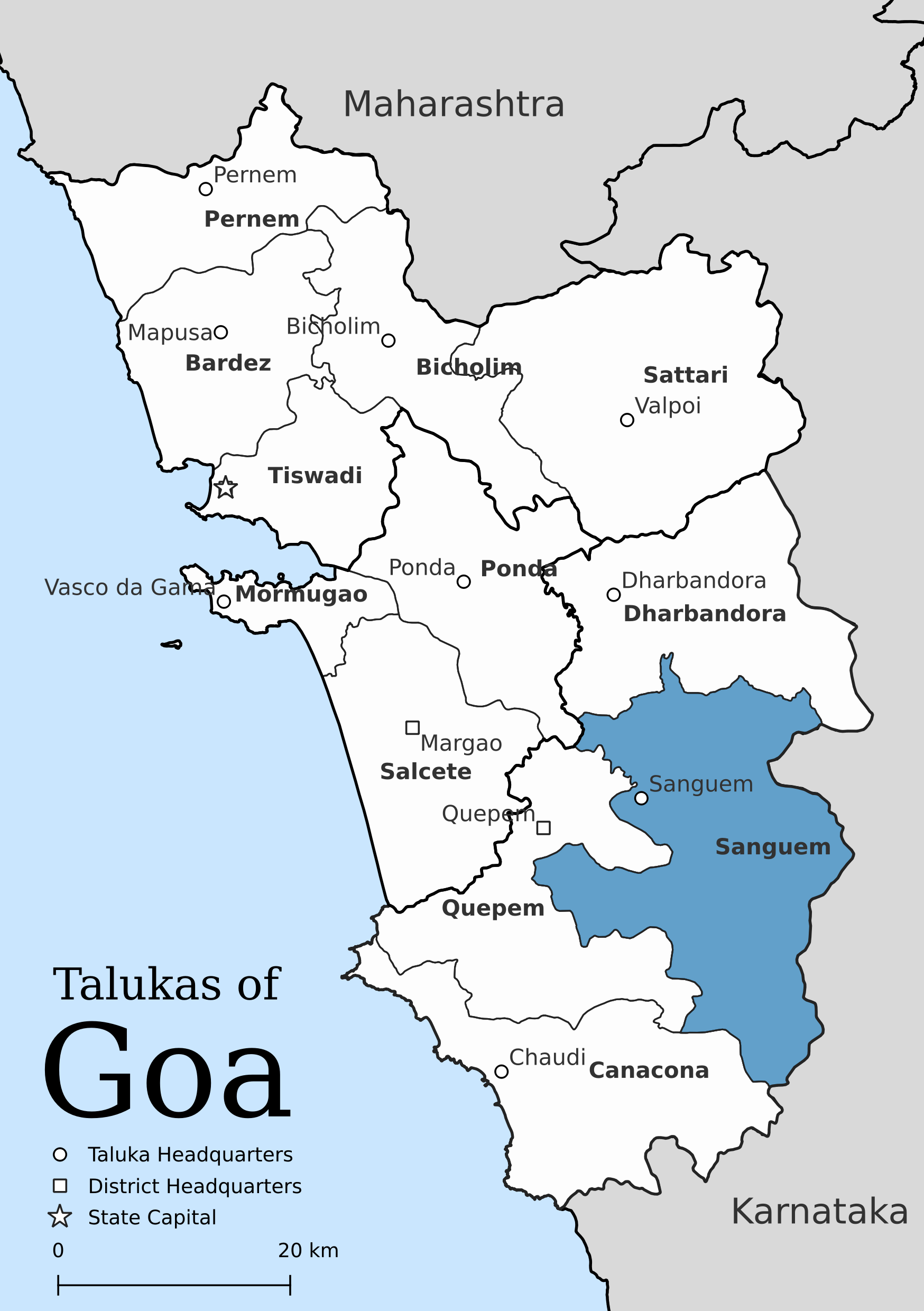
- Location of Sanguem taluka in Goa
- Coordinates: 15.228420°N 74.152152°E
- Country: India
- State: Goa
- District: Kushavati district
- Headquarters: Sanguem city
- Settlements (as of 2011): 1 City; 1 Town; 45 Villages

Government
  - Tehsildar: Ajay Gaude
  - Lok Sabha constituency: North Goa
  - Assembly constituency: Sanguem (Goa Assembly constituency)
  - MLA: Prasad Gaonkar

Population (2011)
  - Taluka: 65,147
  - Urban: 17.72%

Demographics
  - Literacy rate: na
  - Sex ratio: na
- PIN: 4034XX, 4037XX
- Vehicle registration: GA-09
- Rain: na

Sanguem taluka is an administrative region in the Kushavati district of Goa state, India.

== Demographics ==
At the time of the 2011 Census of India, Sanguem had a population of 65,147 with sex ratio of 997 females to 1,000 males. Sanguem taluka has an average literacy rate of 83.43%, compared to the national average of 74.04%: male literacy is 89.60% and female literacy 77.24%. Scheduled Castes and Scheduled Tribes make up 1.12% and 21.94% of the population respectively. 17.72% of the population lives in urban areas.

=== Religion ===
Religion in Sanguem Taluka (2011)
Religion	Percent
Hinduism	78.86%
Christianity	13.86%
Islam	6.62%
Other or not stated	0.66%

Hinduism is followed by the majority of population of Sanguem taluka. Christians form a significant minority. At the time of the 2011 Census of India 78.86% of the population of the taluka followed Hinduism, 13.86% Christianity, 6.62% Islam and 0.24% of the population followed other religions or did not state religion.

=== Languages ===
Konkani is the most commonly spoken language in Sanguem taluka.

Languages of Sanguem Taluka (2011)
1. Konkani (73.5%)
2. Marathi (9.04%)
3. Kannada (6.00%)
4. Hindi (5.96%)
5. Urdu (1.63%)
6. Others (3.92%)

At the time of 2011 Census of India, 73.45% of the population of Sanguem taluka spoke Konkani, 9.04% Marathi, 6.00% Kannada, 5.96% Hindi and 1.63% Urdu as their first language.

== Settlements ==
Many of the villages mentioned below were ceded to the Dharbandora taluka.

=== Cities ===
Sanguem has 1 City: Sanguem City

=== Towns ===
Sanguem has 1 Town: Sanvordem

=== Villages ===
Sanguem has 45 Villages: Aglote, Bandoli, Bati, Calem, Camarconda, Caranzol, Codli, Colem, Colomba, Comproi, Coranginim, Cormonem, Costi, Cotarli, Cumbari, Curdi, Curpem, Dharbandora, Dongor, Dudal, Maulinguem, Moissal, Molem, Muguli, Naiquinim, Netorli, Nundem, Patiem, Piliem, Porteem, Potrem, Rivona, Rumbrem, Sancordem, Sangod, Santona, Sigao, Sonauli, Surla, Tudou, Uguem, Verlem, Vichundrem, Viliena, Xelpem
