= Prabhakar Gaonkar =

Indian politician (1964–2012)

- Official portrait in 1999

Member of Goa Legislative Assembly
- In office June 1999 – 2002
- Preceded by: Pandu Naik
- Succeeded by: Vasudev Gaonkar
- Constituency: Sanguem
- Majority: 3,498 (28.79%)

Personal details
- Born: Prabhakar Pandurang Gaonkar; 4 April 1964 Sanguem, Goa, India
- Died: 14 September 2012 (aged 48) Shiroda, Goa, India
- Party: Bhartiya Janata Party (1999–2002)
- Spouse: Sunanda Gaonkar
- Children: 2
- Education: Higher Secondary School Certificate
- Occupation: Politician

Prabhakar Pandurang Gaonkar (4 April 1964 – 14 September 2012) was an Indian politician from Goa. He was a former member of the Goa Legislative Assembly, representing the Sanguem Assembly constituency from 1999 to 2002. He was a member of the Bharatiya Janata Party.

== Early and personal life ==
Prabhakar Pandurang Gaonkar was born at Sanguem, Goa. He completed his Higher Secondary School Certificate. He was married to Sunanda Gaonkar, the couple had a son and daughter.

== Career ==
Gaonkar contested in the 1999 Goa Legislative Assembly election from the Sanguem Assembly constituency on the Bharatiya Janata Party ticket and emerged victorious. He defeated Indian National Congress candidate, Satyawan Bhadru Dessai by a margin of 787 votes.

== Death ==
Gaonkar was undergoing treatment at Kamaxi Ayurveda College and Hospital, Shiroda for the past few days. On 14 September 2012, Gaonkar died from a brief illness. His funeral rites were later held the next day.

=== Reactions ===
Then Goa chief minister, Manohar Parrikar gave his condolences and stated that Gaonkar had raised several issues that included sugarcane farmers and families displaced due to the Salaulim Dam.

== Positions held ==
- President of Sanguem Constituency for 5 years
- Co-opted Member of Sanguem Municipal
- Former chairman of Industrial Development Corporation
