= Sanvordekar Wada =

Heritage house in Goa, India

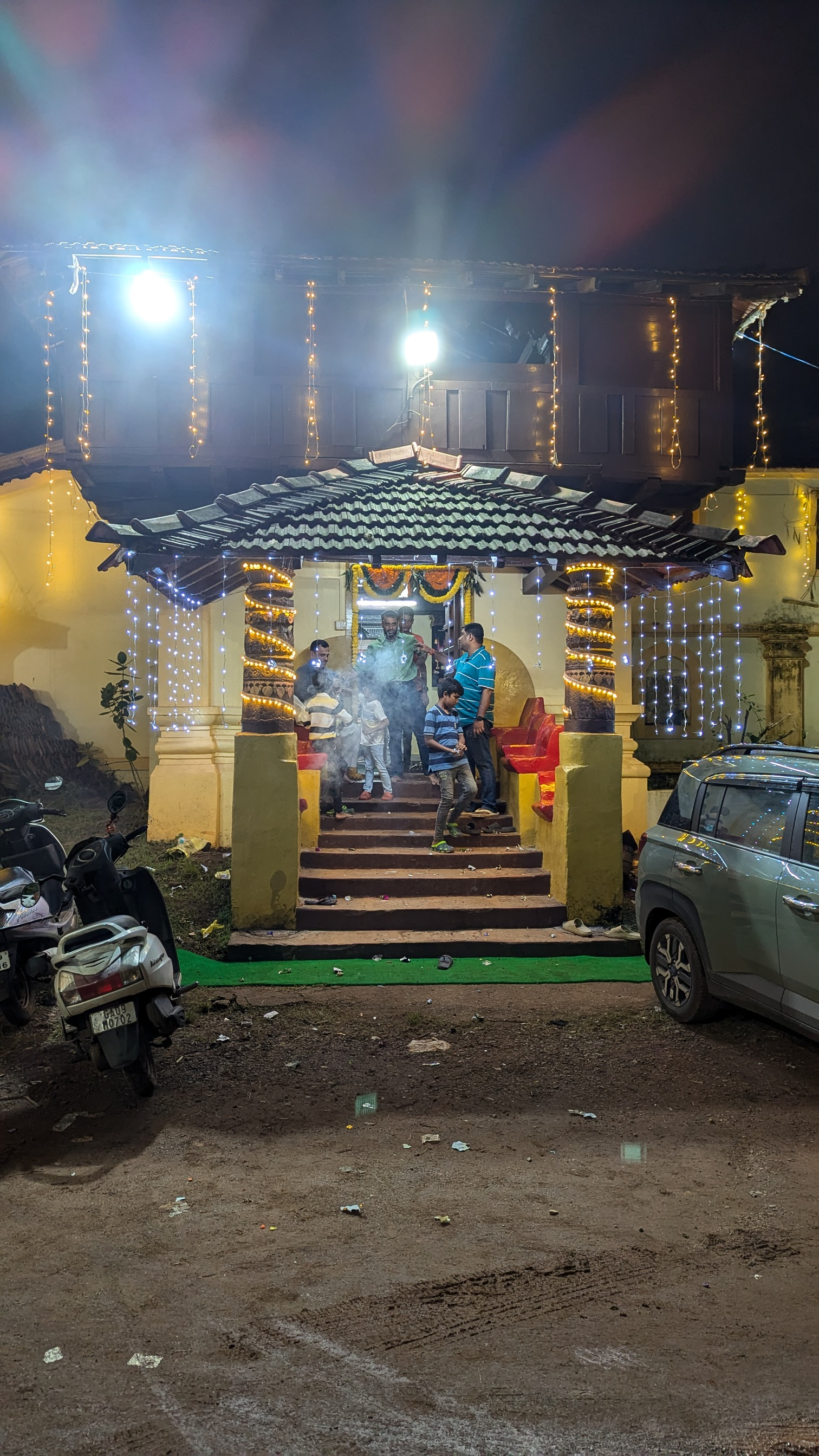
- Front of the Sanvordekar Wada

General information
- Location: Sanvordem, Sanguem taluka, Goa, India
- Coordinates: 15°16′07″N 74°06′29″E

Sanvordekar Wada is a joint‑family mansion in Sanvordem, Sanguem taluka, Goa, housing over 300 members of the Sanvordekar family.

== History ==
According to oral stories, the Sanvordekar family is originally from Codli village near Mollem. However, family members state that this has not been verified. The land for the house was reportedly granted by the Sawants, the Maratha rulers and the Soundekar Raja. The family was also known as "Codlikar Nadkarni Shenvi Sanvordekar".

The family originates from Vithoji Sardar. Vithoji Sardar was reportedly a soldier in the Kadamba dynasty. A prominent family legend states that when dacoits (also identified as the Ranes) attempted to loot the house, they saw a female figure, long open hair, beautifully dressed complete with nine-yard sari and gold ornaments on the second step to the front door. Believing this to be a vision of their Goddess Shree Shantadurga (a local form of Durga), the looters were terrified and fled without stealing anything. Till date, in commemoration, family members and even visitors skip the second step while climbing the stairs to enter the house.

During Portuguese rule, the estate's commonly held properties and finances were administered under the name Casa Sociédade de Sanvordekar. This name is still used for the family's bank accounts.

== Architecture and layout ==
The mansion is arranged around a central courtyard. Thie unites the over 300 family members and is used for ceremonies and gatherings. Surrounding verandahs provide access to various wings. A permanent canopy (matolli), which celebrates the biodiversity of the forests, is erected in front of a permanent stage. The canopy displays wild fruits, medicinal plants and vegetation. A raised platform (sopo) is designated for ritual performances. Decorative elements include clothes pegs carved with bird motifs and brackets depicting cobras and lotuses. The second step at the main entrance is traditionally kept clear in honour of the family’s protective deity.

== Family traditions ==
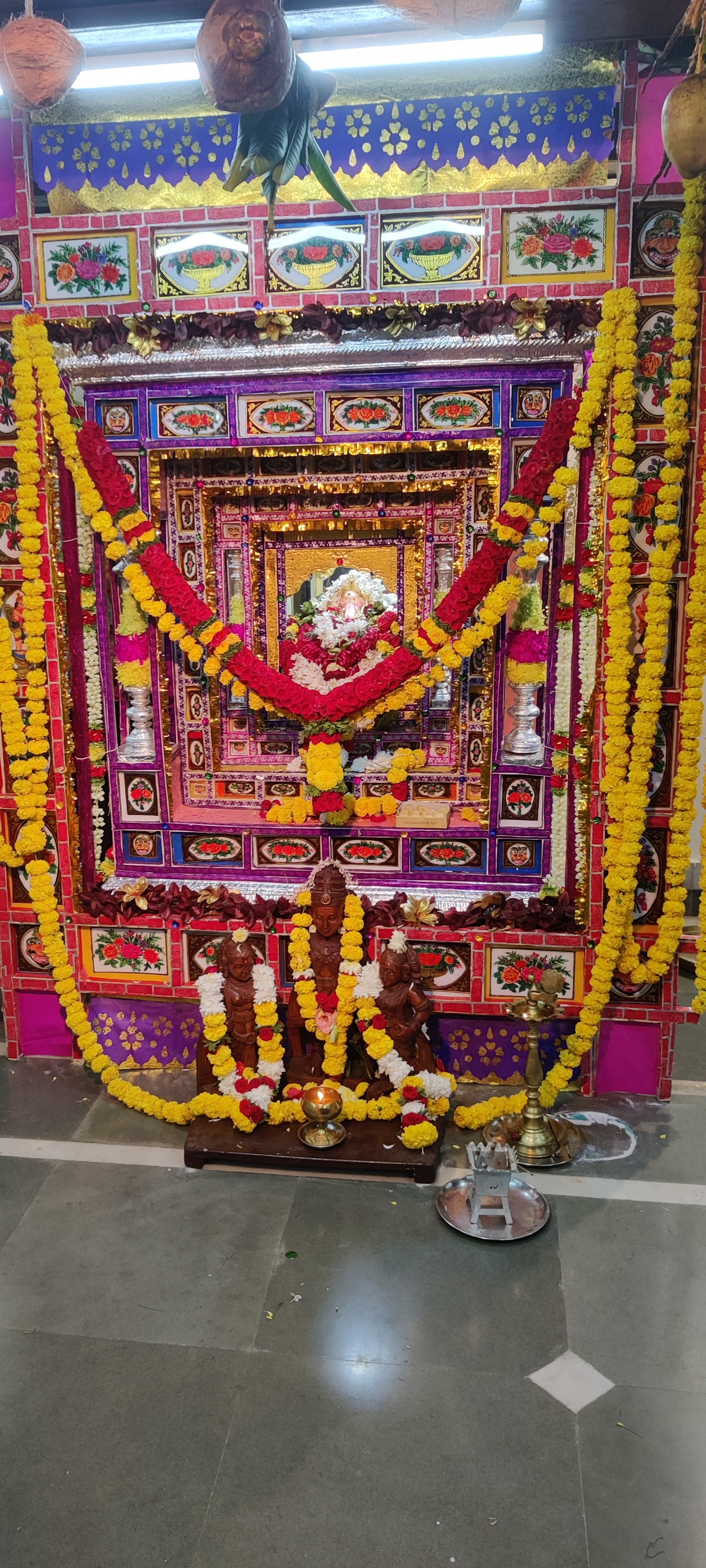
Ganesh Chaturthi at Sanvordekar Wada

The family has celebrated the nine-day Navaratri festival dedicated to Durga for what is believed to be 300 years. Branches of the family rotate responsibility for conducting the festival, with each branch taking its turn, with some turns coming every 32, 45, or 48 years. If a branch cannot fulfil its duties, another member assumes the role and bears the cost. During Navratri, a unique ritual is held where the feet of five unmarried girls (Kanyas) are washed, and they are honoured symbolically as "living goddesses". Other rituals include the Maha Panchamis and the Sav Pitha Amasya, which honour the ancestors.

The family notably comes together for Ganesh Chaturthi. The mansion hosts the village’s first Ganesh puja, after which neighbouring households hold their own ceremonies. The Sadashiv clan is responsible for the swimmers and the visarjan (immersion of the Ganesh idol), while the Minba clan oversees the artistic decorations during the celebration. The idol is described as "modestly small" but is taken to the river with musical accompaniment, such as the ghumot.

Women who marry into the family are noted as being supported and nurtured by the joint family structure. They continue to attend Wada events, and their children may enroll in the family’s former school. In the past, the family operated its own school, ensuring a high standard of education, and would even host the children of daughters who had married and moved to areas without proper schools. Family members have pursued careers as doctors, lawyers, architects, engineers, historians, archaeologists, artists, hoteliers, airline pilots, and army and navy personnel. Alumni include Wing Commander Vishwanath Sanvordekar in the Indian Air Force and Professor J. V. Naik, former Head of the History Department at the University of Mumbai.

The mansion offers hospitality throughout the year, serving traditional snacks, which were historically sent as "care packages" to family members living away, such as in Baroda. These include dhokla, fafda, jalebi, chevdo and chakli. For a long time, they had a family cook. Visitors unable to stay for the full festival celebrations may take food home, a practice that continues today.

== Cultural activities ==
In previous decades, the Wada hosted theatrical performances, dances and fireworks during festivals such as Ganesh Chaturthi, with children and young people participating in plays and skits. Family members recall gathering on the front balcão (balcony) or a large giant rock, and heating bathwater in a huge cauldron. Although some traditional performances have decreased, with some younger members showing less interest post-pandemic, events at the sopo continue to include communal meals and cultural presentations. During festivals, fresh wild fruit, medicinal plants, and vegetation are "auctioned within the family".

== Recent events ==
In 1986, after a gap of several generations, the first wedding at the mansion in decades took place, attended by around 120–125 guests. Since then, the Wada has regularly served as a venue for family weddings, festivals and other gatherings.

While many family members have settled outside Goa or abroad, they continue to return for gatherings.

== Depiction in media ==
The film was used as a shooting location for the Bollywood film, Singham Returns. It also features in a Goan telefilm, Sutkechi Zuzari.
