= List of dams and reservoirs in Goa =

The following are the dams and reservoirs located in Goa:

River	Dam	Height	Length	Type	Storage capacity	Reservoir area	Complete
Amthane Nala	Amthane	25.21 m (83 ft)	450 m (1,476 ft)	Earth-fill	5,970,000 m^{3} (4,840 acre⋅ft)	680,000 m^{2} (168 acres)	1987
Gunuleni Nala	Anjunem	43 m (141 ft)	185 m (607 ft)	Earth-fill & Gravity	44,830,000 m^{3} (36,344 acre⋅ft)	2,530,000 m^{2} (625 acres)	1989
Zuari	Panchwai	20 m (66 ft)	230 m (755 ft)	Earth-fill	4,570,000 m^{3} (3,705 acre⋅ft)	530,000 m^{2} (131 acres)	1989
Chapoli Nallah	M. I. Tank, Chapoli	25.50 m (84 ft)	760 m (2,493 ft)	Earth-fill	9,980,000 m^{3} (8,091 acre⋅ft)	1,100,000 m^{2} (272 acres)	2000
Sanguem	Salaulim	42.70 m (140 ft)	1,004 m (3,294 ft)	Earth-fill & Gravity	234,361,000 m^{3} (190,000 acre⋅ft)	29,640,000 m^{2} (7,324 acres)	2000
