= Tony Fernandes (politician) =

Indian politician

- Official portrait in 1963

Minister of Law, Labour, Industries and Agriculture Government of Goa, Daman and Diu
- In office 20 December 1963 – 1967
- Governor: M. R. Sachdev
- Chief Minister: Dayanand Bandodkar

Member of Goa Legislative Assembly
- In office 1963–1967
- Preceded by: constituency established
- Succeeded by: Vasudev Morajkar
- Constituency: Sanguem

Personal details
- Born: Goa, Portuguese India
- Died: Unknown
- Party: Maharashtrawadi Gomantak Party (June 1963–1967)
- Other political affiliations: Indian National Congress
- Occupation: Politician
- Cabinet: Minister
- Portfolio: Law; Labour; Industries; Agriculture
- Nicknames: Sebastião Fernandes; Sabastyan

Tony Fernandes also known as Sebastião Fernandes or Sabastyan, was an Indian politician. He was a former member of the Goa Legislative Assembly, representing the Sanguem Assembly constituency from 1963 to 1967. He also served as a cabinet minister in the first Dayanand Bandodkar ministry.

== Career ==
Fernandes was a member of the Indian National Congress (INC) before contesting the Goa Legislative Assembly elections. He left INC to join Maharashtrawadi Gomantak Party and contested in the 1963 Goa, Daman and Diu Legislative Assembly election and emerged victorious, he served for five years from 1963 to 1967.

Fernandes was made the cabinet minister in the first Dayanand Bandodkar ministry on 20 December 1963 and was allotted Law, Labour, Industries and Agriculture as portfolios.
