= Ranu Prabhu Desai =

Indian politician and social worker (born 1945)

Member of Goa Legislative Assembly
- In office 1989–1994
- Preceded by: Pandu Naik
- Succeeded by: Pandu Naik
- Constituency: Sanguem

Personal details
- Born: Ranu Anant Prabhu Desai; 8 July 1945 (age 81) Rivona, Goa, Portuguese India
- Party: Maharashtrawadi Gomantak Party (1989–1994)
- Spouse: Shubha Prabhu Desai
- Education: Secondary School Certificate
- Occupation: Politician
- Profession: Social worker
- Committees: Public Undertakings; Library; Privileges

Ranu Anant Prabhu Desai (born 8 July 1945) is an Indian politician and social worker. He is a former member of the Goa Legislative Assembly, representing the Sanguem Assembly constituency from 1989 to 1994.

== Early and personal life ==
Ranu Anant Prabhu Desai was born at Rivona, India. He completed his Secondary School Certificate. He is married to Shubha Prabhu Desai, an agriculturist. Desai currently resides at Colomba, Rivona.

== Positions held ==
- Director of Goa Milk Producers Union
- Chairman of Rushivan Dairy Co-operative Society
- Director of Sugar Factory, Sanguem
- Member of Committee on Public Undertakings 1990, 1991–92
- Member of Library Committee 1990
- Member of Committee on Privileges 1991–92
