= Vasudev Morajkar =

Indian politician (born 1925)

Member of Goa Legislative Assembly
- In office 1967–1977
- Preceded by: Tony Fernandes
- Succeeded by: Sadashiv Marathe
- Constituency: Sanguem

Councillor of Sanguem Municipality
- In office unknown–unknown

Personal details
- Born: Vasudev Datta Morajkar; 15 September 1925
- Party: Maharashtrawadi Gomantak Party (1967–1977)
- Spouse: Ahilyabai Morajkar
- Occupation: Politician
- Profession: Social worker

Vasudev Datta Morajkar (born 15 September 1925) is an Indian politician and social worker from Goa. He is a former member of the Goa Legislative Assembly, representing the Sanguem Assembly constituency from 1967 to 1977. He was a member of the Maharashtrawadi Gomantak Party.

== Positions held ==
- Councillor of Sanguem Municipality for 5 years
- Panel of Chairman 1967–68, 1968–69, 1969–70
- Member of the Committee on Petitions 1967–68, 1968–69, 1969–70, 1970–71 and 1971–72
- Member of the Committee on Delegated Legislation 1969–70
- Member of the Committee on Petitions 1970–71
