= Subhash Phal Desai =

Indian politician

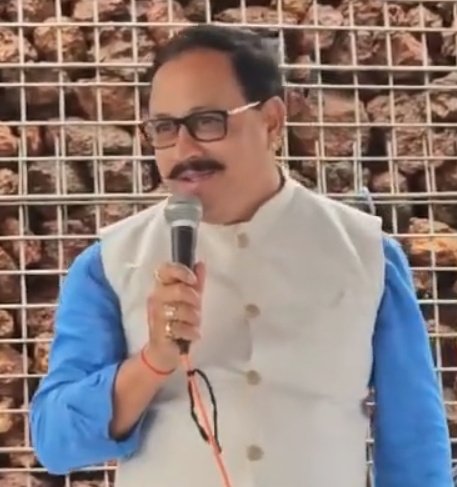
- Phal Desai in 2024

Minister of Social Welfare, River Navigation, Drinking Water and Empowering People with Disabilities, Government of Goa
- Incumbent
- Assumed office 9 April 2022
- Preceded by: Isidore Fernandes

Member of Goa Legislative Assembly
- Incumbent
- Assumed office 2022
- Preceded by: Prasad Gaonkar
- Constituency: Sanguem
- In office 2012–2017
- Preceded by: Vasudev Gaonkar
- Succeeded by: Prasad Gaonkar
- Constituency: Sanguem

Minister of Social Welfare, River Navigation, Archives and Archeology, Government of Goa, Ex-Deputy Speaker of the Goa Legislative Assembly
- In office 30 March 2022 – 9 April 2022
- Preceded by: Isidore Fernandes
- Constituency: Canacona

Personal details
- Born: Subhash Uttam Phal Desai; 20 August 1966 (age 60) Curchorem, Goa, India
- Party: Bharatiya Janata Party
- Spouse: Shubha Phal Dessai
- Children: 2
- Education: Bachelor of Science; Diploma In Computer Application
- Alma mater: University of Bombay; Goa University
- Profession: Dealer in Iron Ore & Transport Contractor

Subhash Uttam Phal Desai (born 20 August 1966) is an Indian politician who serves as a Minister of Social Welfare, River Navigation, Archives and Archeology in the Government of Goa. He was also a former Deputy Speaker of Goa Legislative Assembly and member of Goa Legislative assembly from Sanguem. He also served as a vice-chairman of Entertainment Society of Goa (ESG), who also jointly conduct International Film Festival of India (IFFI) with Ministry of Information and Broadcasting, Government of India. He is the member of the Bharatiya Janata Party.
