= Pandu Naik =

Indian politician and social worker (1940–2016)

- Official portrait in 1994

Member of Goa Legislative Assembly
- In office 1984–1989
- Preceded by: Gurudas Naik Tari
- Succeeded by: Ranu Prabhu Desai
- Constituency: Sanguem
- In office 1994–1999
- Preceded by: Ranu Prabhu Dessai
- Succeeded by: Prabhakar Gaonkar
- Constituency: Sanguem

Minister of Forest and Mines Government of Goa
- In office 1998–unknown
- Governor: J. F. R. Jacob
- Chief Minister: Wilfred de Souza

Personal details
- Born: Pandu Vassu Naik; 31 August 1940 Sanguem, Goa, Portuguese India
- Died: 1 August 2016 (aged 75) Curchorem, Goa, India
- Party: Indian National Congress (1984–1994)
- Spouse: Kishori Naik
- Children: 3
- Education: Formal
- Occupation: Politician; businessman; social worker
- Committees: Public Undertakings; Library; Estimates; Government Assurances
- Portfolio: Forest; Mines

Pandu Vassu Naik (31 August 1940 – 2 August 2016) was an Indian politician, businessman, and social worker. He was a member of the Goa Legislative Assembly, representing the Sanguem Assembly constituency from 1984 to 1989 and 1994 to 1999.

== Early and personal life ==
Pandu Vassu Naik was born at Benwado, Sanguem in Portuguese Goa. He completed his formal education. He was married to Kishori Naik, the couple has two sons and a daughter. Naik loved participating in dramas and reading. He had a special interest to be part of the politics. He also practiced social work and resided at Bazarwada, Sanguem.

== Death ==
On 1 August 2016, Naik died from a brief illness, aged 75. His last rites were held the next day.

== Positions held ==
- Director of Goa State Co-operative Bank Ltd.
- Member of State Transport Authority
- Member of Public Undertakings Committee 1995–96
- Chairman of Library Committee 1995–96
- Member of Estimates Committee 1995–96
- Member of Government Assurances Committee 1995–96
- Former Chairman of Goa Housing Board
