= Sadashiv Marathe =

Indian politician and social worker (1942–2010)

- Official portrait, 1977

Member of Goa Legislative Assembly
- In office 1977–1980
- Preceded by: Vasudev Morajkar
- Succeeded by: Gurudas Naik Tari
- Constituency: Sanguem
- Majority: 5,239 (50.18%)

Personal details
- Born: Sadashiv Vaman Marathe; 1942 Dharbandora, Goa, Portuguese India
- Died: 27 November 2010 (aged 67–68) Goa, India
- Party: Maharashtrawadi Gomantak Party (1977–1980)
- Spouse: Vasanti Tamhankar
- Occupation: Politician; social worker
- Committees: Block Advisory; Library; Estimates; Delegated Legislation

Sadashiv Vaman Marathe (1942 – 27 November 2010) was an Indian politician and social worker. He was a former member of the Goa Legislative Assembly, representing the Sanguem Assembly constituency from 1977 to 1980.

== Early and personal life ==
Sadashiv Vaman Marathe was born at Dharbandora in Portuguese Goa (now part of Dharbandora taluka). He was married to Vasanti Tamhankar, an agriculturist. Marathe had a special interest in agriculture and hunting being one of his hobbies. He resided at Dharbandora, Goa.

== Death ==
Marathe died on 27 November 2010. He was one of the few prominent people that were made obituary references and was given tributes by the then legislators of the Goa Legislative Assembly.

== Positions held ==
- Chairman of Service Society of Dharbandora
- Member of Dharbandora Panchayat from 1967
- Secretary of Sarvodaya Education Society Usgaon
- Vice-Chairman of Bhausaheb Bandodkar Shikshan Prasarak Sanstha, Dharbandora
- Vice Chairman Vijaya Dugdh Sahakari Society, Dharbandora
- Member of Block advisory Committee Sanguem
- Chairman of Sanguem Taluka Krida Samiti
- Member of Committee on Delegated Legislation 1977–78
- Member of Library Committee 1977–78
- Member of Estimates Committee 1977–78

== Bibliography ==
- Shree Akkalakotnivasi Swamimaharaj Yanche Sachitra va Sagra Charitra (Marathi)
