= Gurudas Naik Tari =

Indian politician and social worker (died 2008)

- Official portrait in 1980

Member of Goa Legislative Assembly
- In office 1980–1984
- Preceded by: Sadashiv Marathe
- Succeeded by: Pandu Naik
- Constituency: Sanguem
- Majority: 6,365 (51.56%)

Personal details
- Born: Gurudas Vasudeo Naik Tari Sanguem, Goa, Portuguese India
- Died: 15 March 2008 Nanded, Maharashtra, India
- Political party: Indian National Congress (U) (1980–1984)
- Spouse: Shanti Naik
- Occupation: Politician
- Profession: Social worker
- Committees: Select Committee on Bill No. 27; Goa, Daman and Diu Education Bill; Petitions

Gurudas Vasudeo Naik Tari (unknown – 15 March 2008) was an Indian politician and social worker. He was a former member of the Goa Legislative Assembly, representing the Sanguem Assembly constituency from 1980 to 1984.

== Early and personal life ==
Gurudas Vasudeo Naik Tari was born and hailed from Taripanta, Sanguem. He was married to Shanti Naik, a forest contractor. He had a keen interest in reading dramas and had a special interest in social work.

== Death ==
On 15 March 2008, Tari died as a result of a heart attack while on a business trip with his friends at Nanded, India.

== Positions held ==
- Member of Sanguem V.K. Sahakari Society, Sanguem
- Member of the Select Committee on Bill No. 27 of 1980
- The Goa, Daman and Diu Education Bill, 1980
- Member Committee on Petitions 1980–81
