= Salaulim Dam =

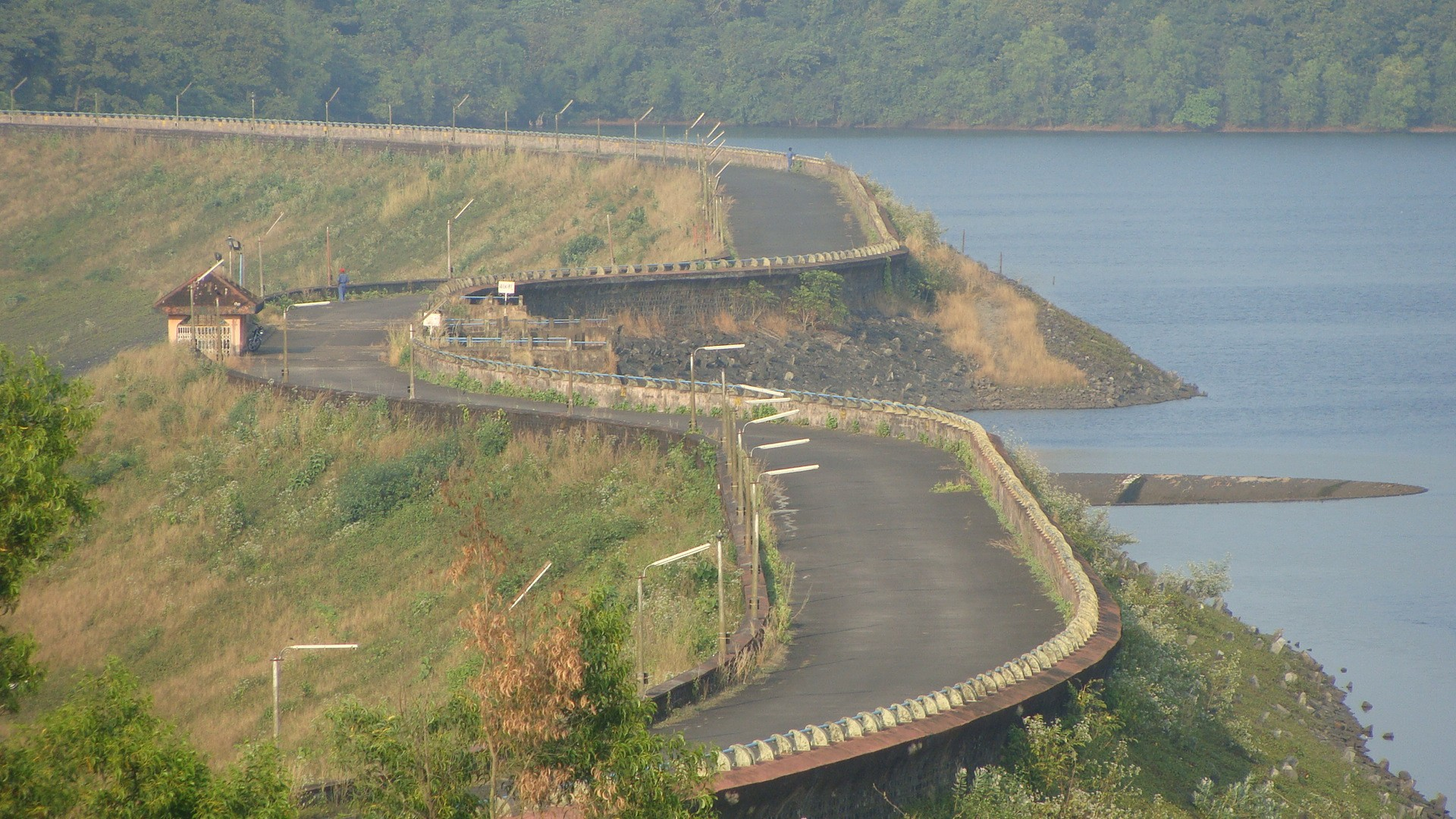
- Aerial view of Salaulim Dam, Goa

- Location within Goa Location within India
- Official name: Salaulim Dam
- Country: India
- Location: Kushavati district, Goa
- Coordinates: 15°12′47″N 74°10′44″E
- Construction began: 1975
- Opening date: 2000
- Construction cost: Rs 170 Crores (present estimate)
- Owner: Goa Water Resources Department

Dam and spillways
- Type of dam: Earth dam with concrete Spillway
- Impounds: Guleli River, a tributary of Zuari River
- Height: 42.7 metres (140 ft)
- Length: 1,004 metres (3,294 ft)
- Spillways: One
- Spillway type: Concrete, Duckbill type (Morning Glory) 44 m long

Reservoir
- Creates: Salaulim Reservoir
- Total capacity: Live storage 227,000,000 m^{3} (8.0×10^{9} cu ft)
- Surface area: 24 km^{2} (9.3 sq mi)

The Salaulim Dam is located on the Guleli River, a tributary of the Zuari River in Goa, India. It is an integral component of the Salaulim Irrigation Project which envisages benefits of irrigation and drinking water supply. The dam is a composite earth+masonry dam of 42.7 metres (140 ft) height with a water spread area of 24 km^{2} (9.3 sq mi).

It was initially planned to provide irrigation to an ultimate potential of 14,326 hectares (35,400 acres) and water supply of 160 million liters per day (MLD) to South Goa; the water supply component for domestic and industrial use is now increased to 380 MLD. The initial cost of the project, when approved in 1971, was Rs. 9.61 crore, which, as of 2007, is estimated to cost Rs. 170 crores. However, the construction of the project was started in 1976 and the dam was completed in 2000, and the irrigation component is under final stages of completion having achieved an irrigation potential of 9,537 ha, as of 2007.

== Geography ==
The project is located at Xelpem about 5 km from the Sanguem town, in the Zuari River Basin, which is drained by the Zuari River which in turn is formed after the confluence of Guleli and Uguem Rivers in Sanguem taluka. The Salaulim dam is located on the Guleli River (also known as Salauli river) near the Sanguem town. The river drains a catchment area of 227 km^{2} (88 sq mi).

== Project features ==
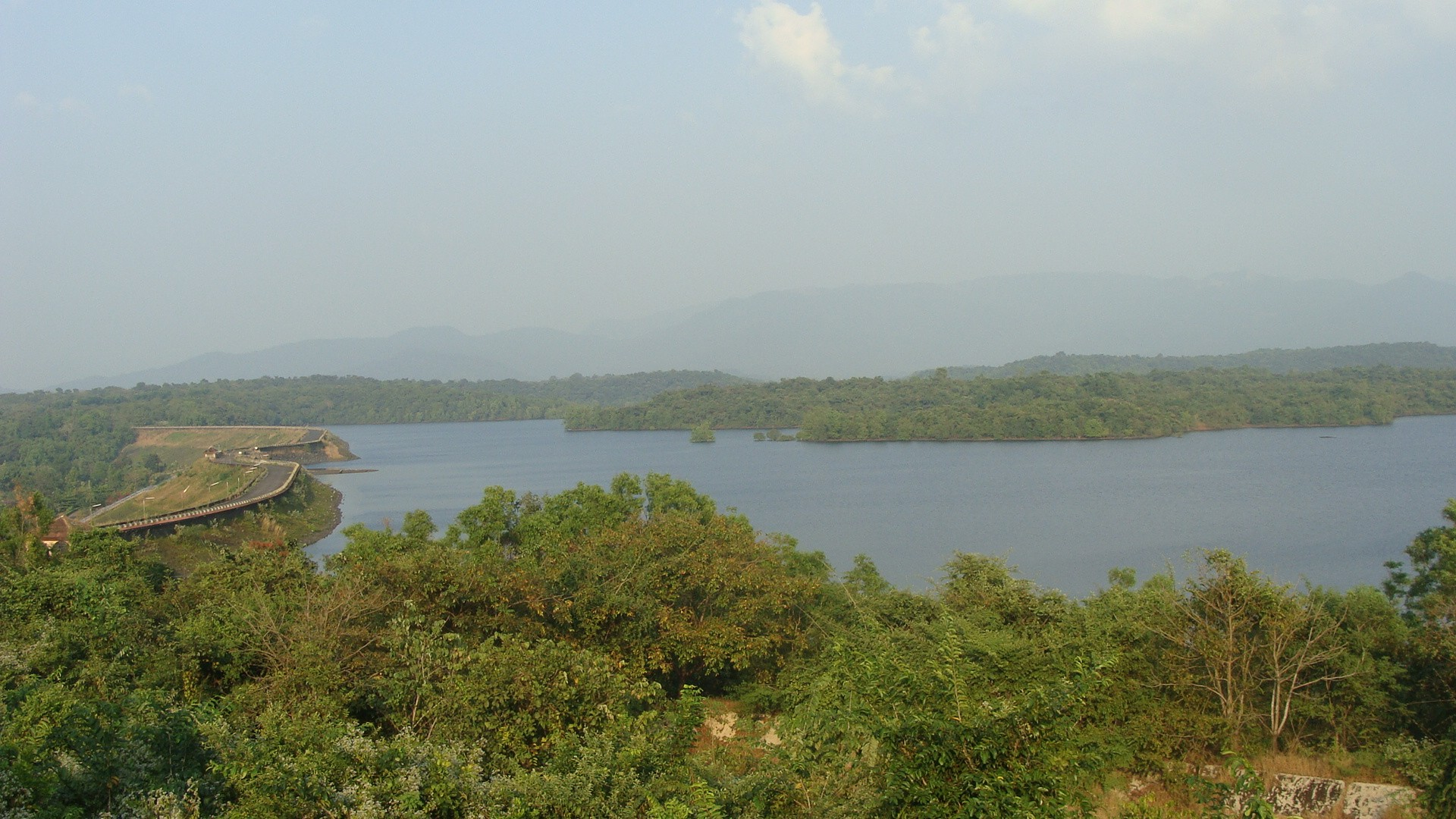
Reservoir water spread of the Salaulim Dam

The dam which is also Goa's largest dam in terms of storage capacity of water, is a composite structure of earth-cum-masonry type of 42.70 metres (140.1 ft) height above the deepest foundation level. The length of dam at the crest is 1,004 metres (3,294 ft) and the reservoir water spread area (within Goa without inter-state implications) is 24 km^{2} (9.3 sq mi). The dam structure has a volume content of 2.714 million cubic metres (MCM). The gross storage capacity of the reservoir is 234.361 MCM with the live or effective storage capacity fixed at 227.157 MCM(8 TMCft) The spillway which is of the unique Duckbill type (Morning Glory type) is an ungated structure located in the gorge section with a length of 44 metres (144 ft) which is designed to pass an estimated Design Flood Discharge of 1,450 cubic metres (51,000 cu ft)/s. Out the total live storage of about 227 MCM, 126 MCM is for irrigation and the balance 101 MCM is earmarked for domestic and industrial water use. As a result, 220 MLD of water is available for industrial and domestic use in South Goa, in addition to 160 MLD originally provided in the approved project.

=== Submergence ===
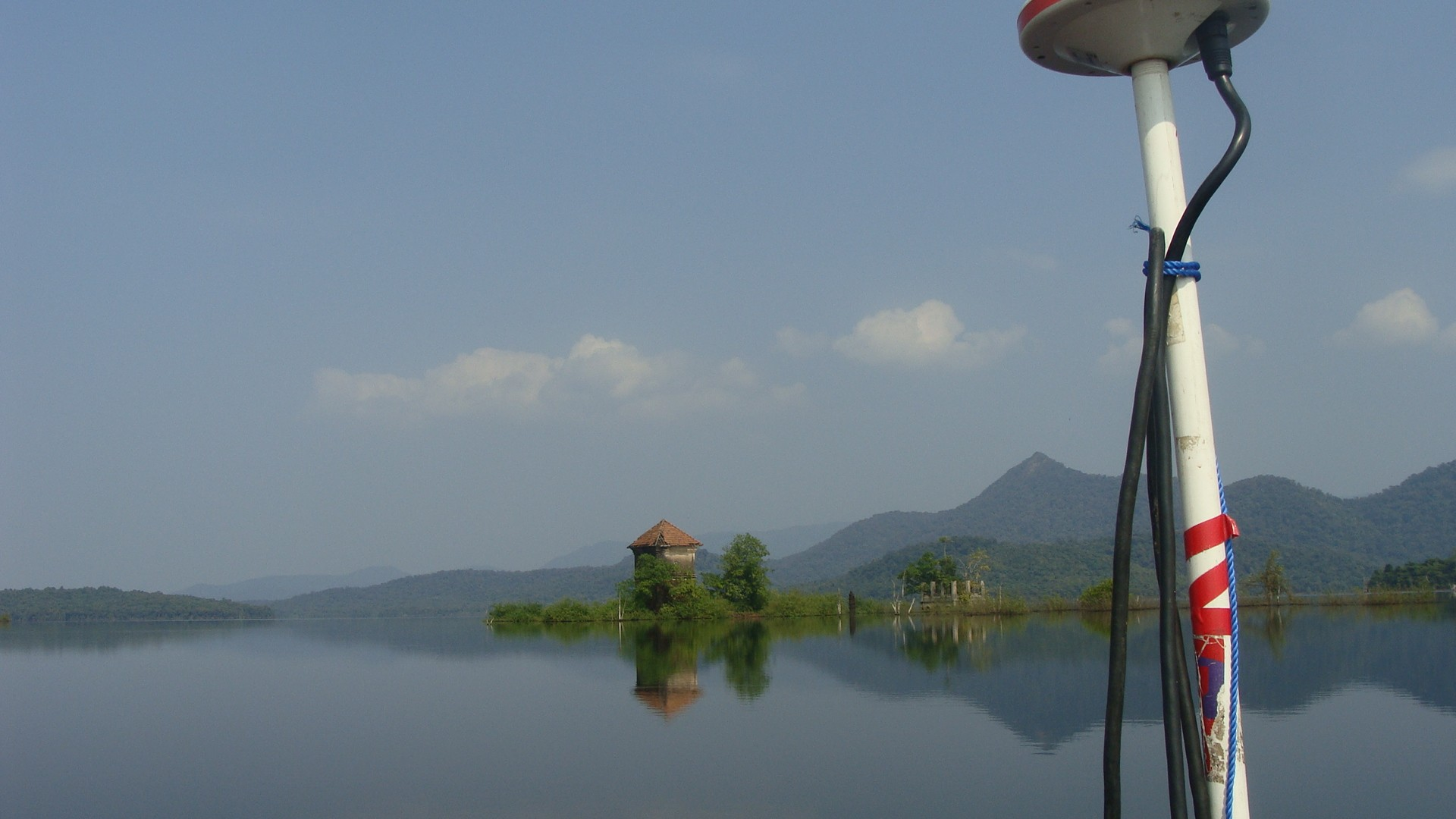
Island in the reservoir submergence area of Salaulim Dam

The reservoir submergence involved 20 villages which were partially or fully submerged. 3000 people were displaced and resettled. Mining areas were also submerged for which compensation was provided. Apart from submergence of villages, the 2.5 metres (8 ft 2 in) tall figure of Mother Goddess (dated to 5th century BC), a 16 tonne image, which was to come under the submergence village of Curdi in Sanguem taluka was relocated at Verna. Another temple, archaeologically dated to the 10th–11th century of the Kadamaba period, at Kurdi, Angod, which was falling under the submergence area of Salauli Reservoir, was also relocated to a site 17 kilometres (11 mi) away. The relocation was done by dismantling of the original temple and then reassembling it at the new location after methodically numbering each stone, over a period of 11 years.

=== Seismicity ===
Following an earthquake in the project area (which lasted for 5 seconds and had no effect on the safety of the dam), a proposal has been mooted to install a seismograph near Salaulim dam (location 5 kilometres (3.1 mi) from the Sanguem town) to monitor any tectonic activity in the area.

=== Irrigation system ===
The irrigation system of the project was planned to irrigate lands in Sanguem, Quepum and Salceto talukas (to grow sugar cane to meet the needs of Goa's first sugar mill). The canal, which takes off from the dam is on the left bank, known as the "Left Bank Main Canal" which is 25.73 kilometres (15.99 mi) long, and is designed to carry a discharge of 13.6 cubic metres (480 cu ft)/s. It has a network of distributary canals and minor canals to provide irrigation to an ultimate potential of 14,326 hectares (35,400 acres). As originally planned, the main canal had distributary canals D1, D2-D3 (combined off taking from the main canal at chainage 17.05 kilometres (10.59 mi)), minor canals M1, M2 and M3, which are all completed. However, the length of two of the distributary canals (D2 and D3) has been curtailed thus reducing the irrigation command by 4,680 hectares (11,600 acres). The water thus saved is proposed to be used for increasing the water supply for domestic and industrial users by about 220 MLD. The total irrigation potential created is 14,106 hectares (34,860 acres)(ultimate potential) of which the CCA is 9,537 hectares (23,570 acres). As a part of the command area development, 28 Water Users Associations (WUAs) have been instituted and out of these, 15 WUAs have been given control over the water distribution networks.

=== Other benefits ===
In the vicinity of the Salaulim dam area, proposals were mooted to set up a health centre with a modern hospital with 300 beds, along with a nature park and a botanical garden. The Botanical Garden was planned by the Goa Forest Department, patterned on the Brindavan Gardens in Mysore, involving landscaping and ornamental plantation.

Fish is an important factor in the life of Goans and in this context the reservoir area of Salaulim and Anjunem Irrigation projects have also provided livelihood opportunities for the fishing community. Fish seed farming was started in the fresh water lake of Salaulim for fish production.

== Pollution ==
Mining operations are still done in three mines, which are located within 1 km from the reservoir periphery. A panel of experts has advised the authorities concerned to take adequate steps to prevent pollution of lake waters by mining effluents, as the reservoir is a source of drinking water supply.
