= Sanguem Assembly constituency =

Legislative Assembly constituency in Goa State, India

Coordinates: 15.23°N 74.15°E

Sanguem
- Constituency No. 39 for the Goa Legislative Assembly

Constituency details
- Country: India
- Region: Western India
- State: Goa
- District: South Goa
- Lok Sabha constituency: South Goa
- Established: 1963
- Total electors: 26,659
- Reservation: None

Member of Legislative Assembly
- 8th Goa Legislative Assembly
- Incumbent Subhash Phal Desai
- Party: Bharatiya Janata Party

Sanguem Assembly constituency is one of the 40 Goa Legislative Assembly constituencies of the state of Goa in southern India. Sanguem is also one of the 20 constituencies falling under South Goa Lok Sabha constituency.

== Members of Goa Legislative Assembly ==
Year	Member	Party
1963	Tony Fernandes	Maharashtrawadi Gomantak Party
1967	Vasudev Morajkar	Maharashtrawadi Gomantak Party
1972	Vasudev Morajkar	Maharashtrawadi Gomantak Party
1977	Sadashiv Marathe	Maharashtrawadi Gomantak Party
1980	Gurudas Naik Tari	Indian National Congress
1984	Pandu Naik	Indian National Congress
1989	Ranu Prabhu Desai	Maharashtrawadi Gomantak Party
1994	Pandu Naik	Indian National Congress
1999	Prabhakar Gaonkar	Bharatiya Janata Party
2002	Vasudev Gaonkar	Bharatiya Janata Party
2007	Vasudev Gaonkar	Bharatiya Janata Party
2012	Subhash Phal Desai	Bharatiya Janata Party
2017	Prasad Gaonkar	Independent
2022	Subhash Phal Desai	Bharatiya Janata Party

== Election results ==
=== 2027 Assembly election ===
2027 Goa Legislative Assembly election: Sanguem
Party	Candidate	Votes	%	±%
INC				
NDA				
NOTA	None of the above			
Majority				
Turnout				
gain from		Swing		

=== 2022 ===
2022 Goa Legislative Assembly election: Sanguem
Party	Candidate	Votes	%	±%
BJP	Subhash Phal Desai	8,724	36.73	
Independent	Savitri Chandrakant Kavlekar	7,295	30.71	
INC	Prasad Gaonkar	4,644	19.55	
RGP	Sunil Gaonkar	1,500	6.32	
AAP	Abhijeet Desai	894	3.76	
NOTA	None of the Above	241	1.01	
AITC	Rakhi Prabhudesai Naik	185	0.78	
NCP	Domacio Barreto	174	0.73	
Independent	Ramesh Gopal Velinkar	94	0.4	
Majority				
Turnout		23,751	86.19	

=== 2017 ===
2017 Goa Legislative Assembly election: Sanguem
Party	Candidate	Votes	%	±%
Independent	Prasad Gaonkar	7,636	33.98%	+7.30%
BJP	Subhash Phal Desai	6,699	29.81%	−4.17%
INC	Savitri Kavlekar	5,736	25.52%	+25.52%
Independent	Dattaprasad Savardekar	989	4.4%	N/A
AAP	Ravindra Arjun Velip	659	2.93%	New
MGP	Vasudev Gaonkar	484	2.15%	New
NOTA	None of the Above	208	0.93%	New
Independent	Sudesh Gaunkar	148	0.66%	N/A
NCP	Rakhi Naik	125	0.56%	−31.86%
Majority		937	4.18%	+1.93%
Turnout		22,683	88.02%	+0.14%

== See also ==
- List of constituencies of the Goa Legislative Assembly
- South Goa district
