= Prasad Gaonkar =

Indian politician (born 1976)

Member of Goa Legislative Assembly
- In office 2017–2022
- Preceded by: Subhash Phal Desai
- Succeeded by: Subhash Phal Desai
- Constituency: Sanguem

Personal details
- Born: 30 August 1976 (age 49) Quepem, Goa, India
- Party: Indian National Congress

Prasad Gaonkar (born 30 August 1976) is an Indian politician. He was elected to the Goa Legislative Assembly from Sanguem in the 2017 Goa Legislative Assembly election as an Independent MLA. He supported the Manohar Parrikar led government in 2017 and was Chairman of the Goa Forest Development Corporation.
