= Curdi =

Curdi Kurdi
- Village
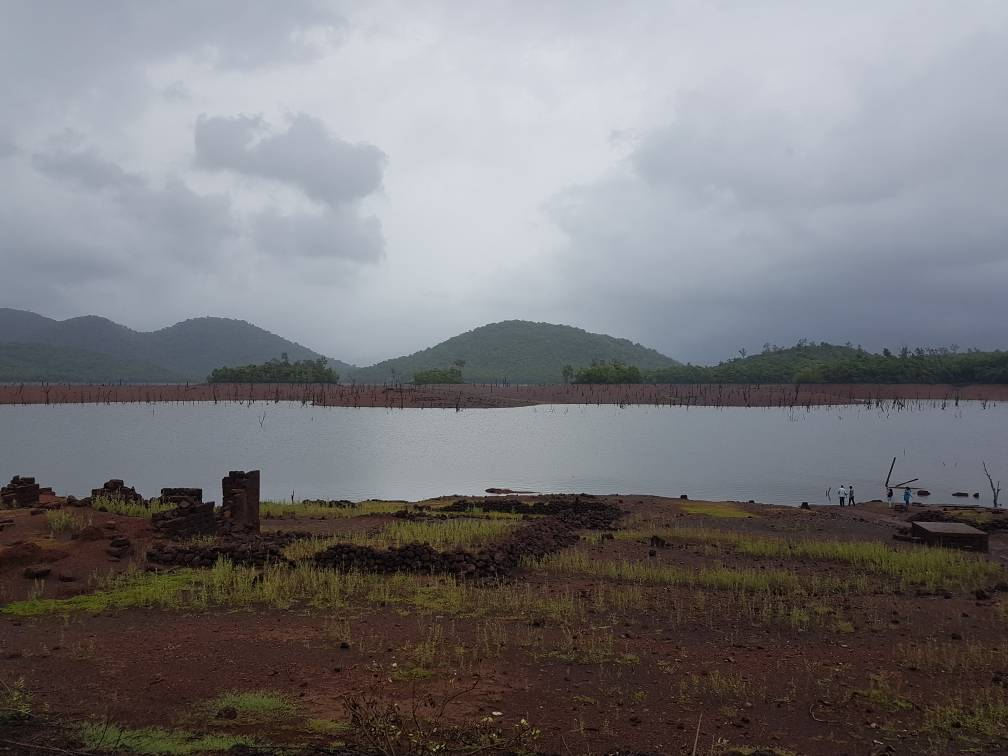
- Curdi village

- Location in Goa, India Curdi (India)
- Coordinates: 15°09′N 74°11′E
- Country: India
- State: Goa
- District: Kushavati district

Languages
  - Official: Konkani
- Time zone: UTC+5:30 (IST)

Curdi (native name: Kurdi) is a village in Sanguem taluka of Goa. The village was submerged in the 1980s by the reservoir of the Salaulim Dam. Every year, at the peak of summer during April–May, parts of the submerged village rise above the water level for around one month. During this period, the original villagers come back to relive their memories and gather around their respective places of worship. Most of the villagers were rehabilitated to the nearby villages of Valkinim and Vaddem, and have since spread across Goa and beyond.

== Location ==
The village is located in Sanguem taluka, and is accessible by bike via the Curchorem-Ponda road. It is located approximately 5 kilometres (3.1 mi) from Salaulim Dam's catchment area and has become a tourist destination when it resurfaces from under the water in May.

== History ==
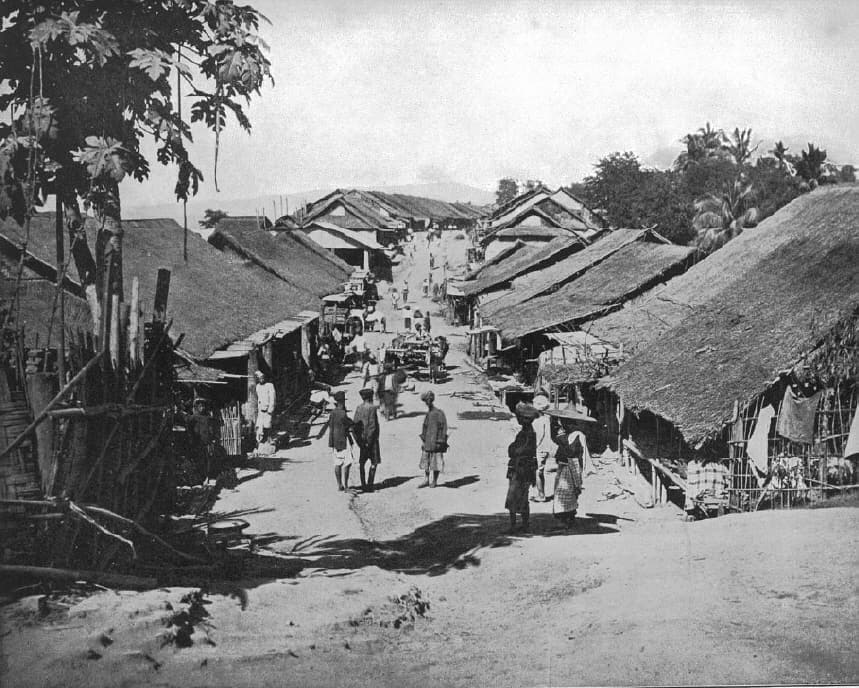
Curdi village in the early 1920s

Kurdi was a prosperous agricultural village with a population of approximately 3,000. It had a main Hindu temple, smaller temples, a Christian chapel, and a Muslim shrine.

In the 1960s, Dayanand Bandodkar, the then Chief Minister of Goa, decided to build the Salaulim dam to supply water to a large part of the state. Understanding that the villages of Curdi and Kurpem would be submerged by the reservoir, he offered the villagers rehabilitation in the nearby villages of Valkinim and Vaddem. The families were compensated with 10,000 square metres (110,000 sq ft) of agricultural land by the government. With all plans in place, the people of Curdi began moving out by 1971, making way for the construction of the dam by 1975.

The reservoir submergence involved 20 villages which were partially or fully submerged. 3000 people (over 450 families) were displaced and resettled. The 2.5 metres (8 ft 2 in) tall figure of Mother Goddess (dated to 5th century BC), a 16 tonne image, in the village was relocated to Verna. Another temple (dedicated to Mahadev), archaeologically dated to the 10th–11th century of the Kadamba period, at Curdi, Angod, was also relocated to a site 17 kilometres (11 mi) away. The relocation was done by dismantling of the original temple and then reassembling it at the new location after methodically numbering each stone, over a period of 11 years.

The village also has a 10 kilometres (6.2 mi) long irrigation canal that was cut through laterite stone and is more than 10 metres (33 ft) deep at most parts and winds its way through the religious structures. The canal's water was diverted by bunding it annually, until a man named Bosle built the permanent Bosle bund 150 years ago.

Devabhag, Stristal, Karemal, Unan, Akrimal, Dhapode, Talsai and Kaman, among others, were the various smaller colonies of the village. Of these, Talsai and about half of Kurpem were not submerged by the reservoir.

In 2017, the remains of a temple dedicated to Ganesha were discovered about 500 metres (1,600 ft) away from the Shree Someshwar Temple. The temple's existence was not known as it was covered with thick vegetation before the submergence of the village.

== Aftermath ==
In the initial days of relocation, the original inhabitants of Curdi village had to survive in rehabilitation homes provided by the government in the town of Vaddem. To date, they face problems with drinking water, irrigation, healthcare, employment, network coverage and electricity. This is partly due to the fact that the village does not receive water from the Salaulim Dam project.

== Annual gathering ==
When parts of the submerged village appear above the water level during May, the original inhabitants go back with their families to picnic at the various standing structures of the village. They celebrate the feast of a chapel, which lies just above the water line on a hillock. The original villagers also celebrate the utsava of the Someshwar Temple in this village. A Muslim shrine is also present here.

== Documentary ==
In 2016, young filmmaker Saumyananda Sahi chose to make a documentary about the village, after reading the thesis on the village written by Venisha Fernandes, whose family originally hails from the village. Fernandes chose her ancestral village as the subject for her dissertation as part of her Masters in Sociology at Goa University. Titled Remembering Kurdi, it is produced by the Films Division of India and has interviews of the original inhabitants interspersed with the scenery of the village when it is above the water level in May. It also has excerpts from a film shot at the village in 1977 by Vinay Dhumale, titled Gana Tapaswini. It features the Someshwar temple, the house of Mogubai Kurdikar, and village plantations. Sahi also organised a screening of the film for the original inhabitants living at Vaddem.

== Notable individuals ==
- Mogubai Kurdikar
- Kishori Amonkar

== Gallery ==
Glimpses of Curdi

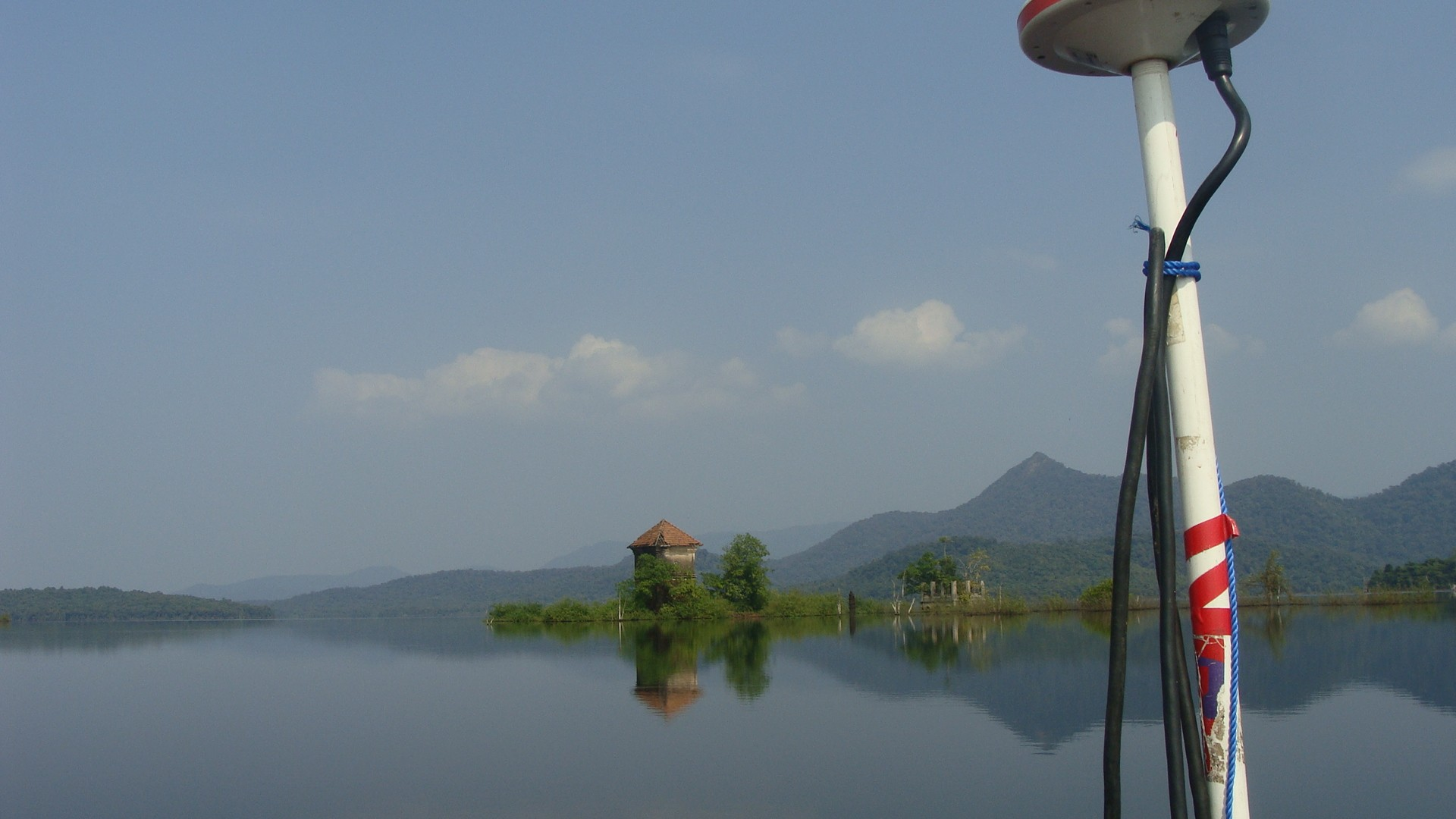
Someshwar Temple seen submerged

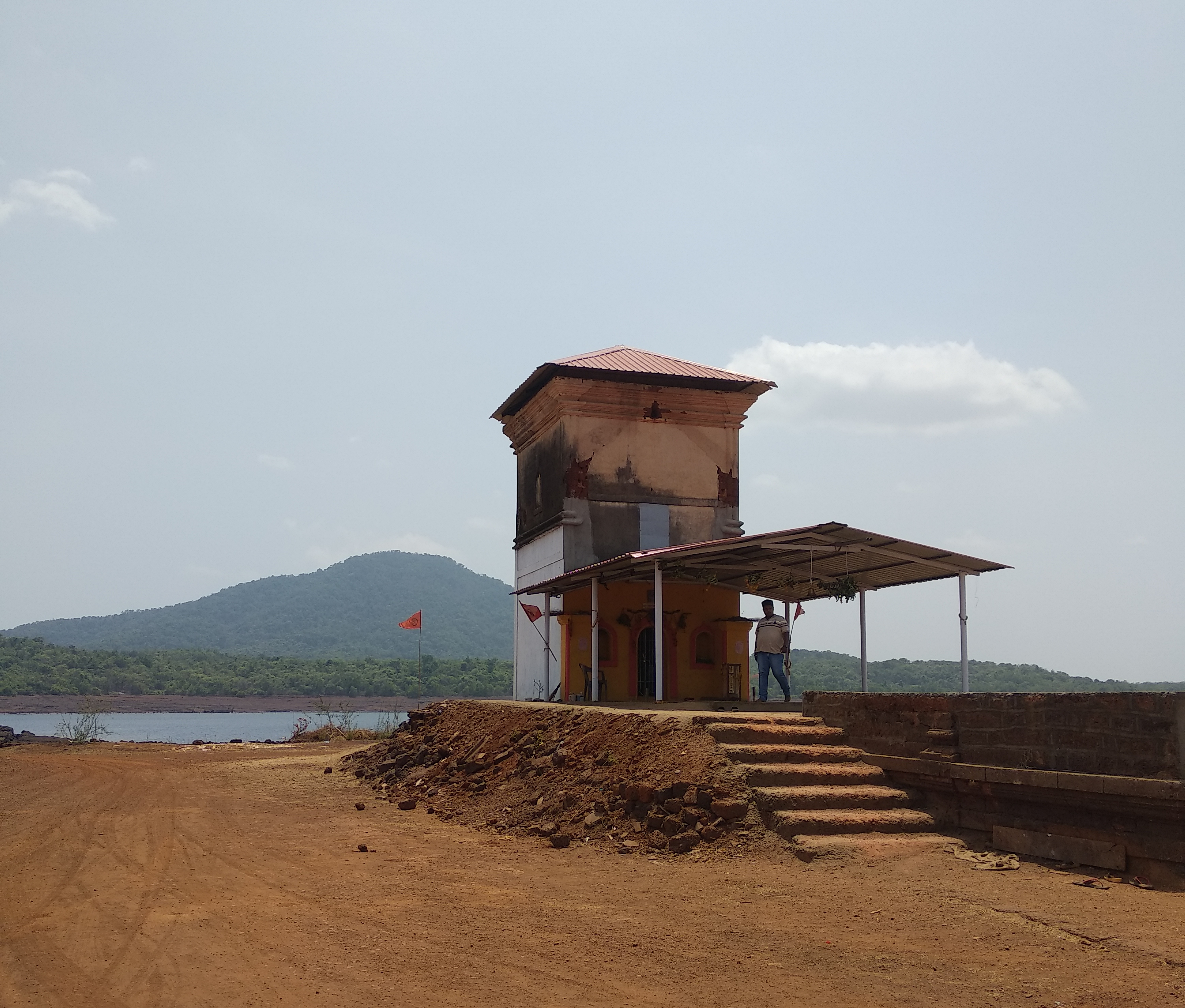
Someshwar Temple as seen today

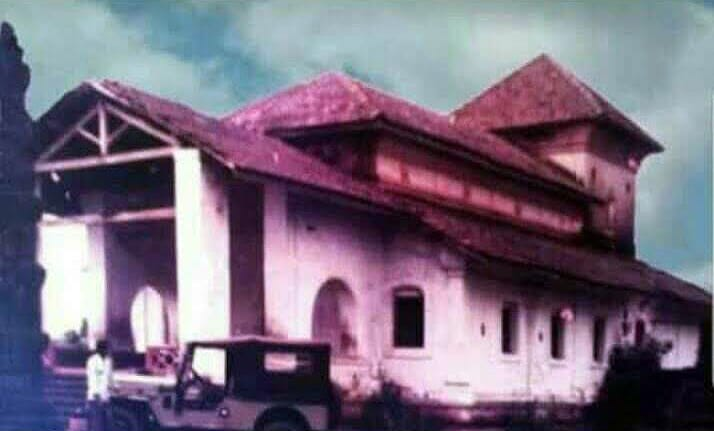
Someshwar Temple as seen in 1984

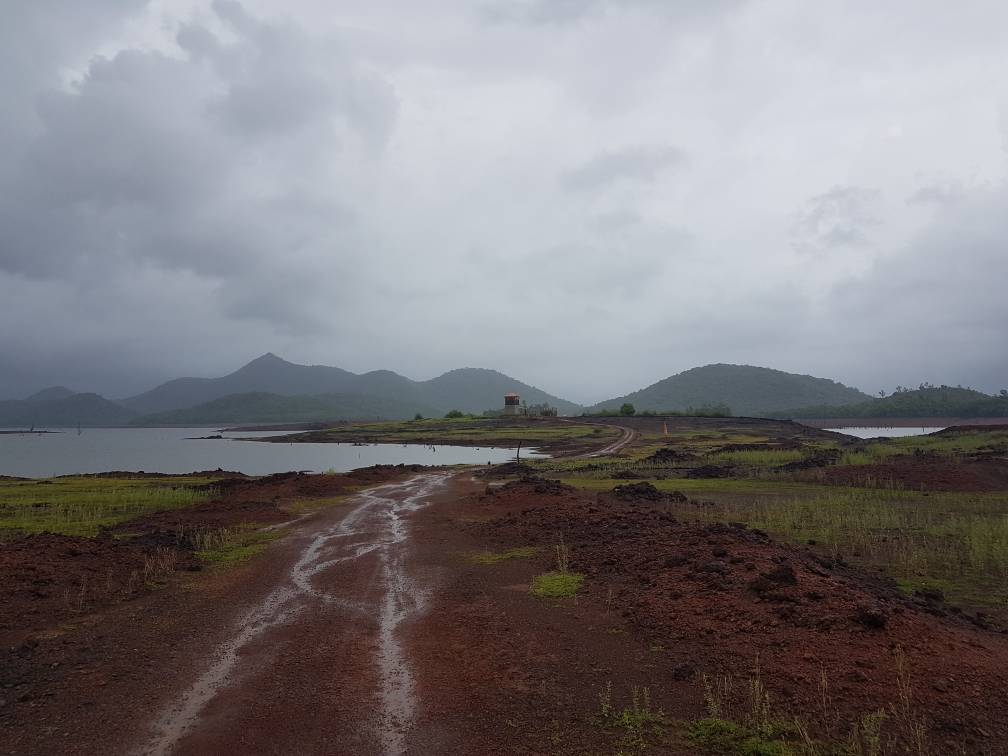
Path to the Someshwar Temple seen in summer

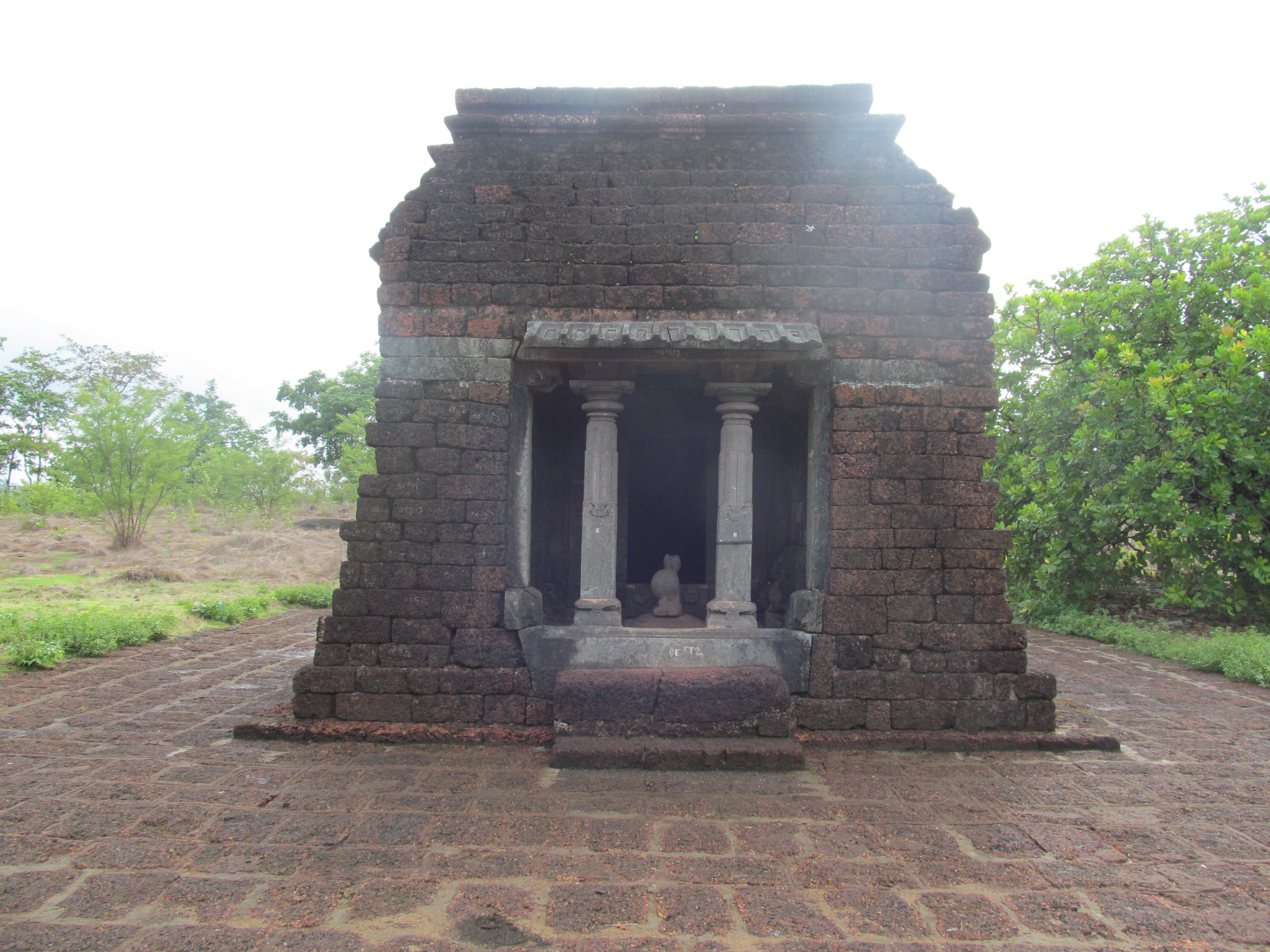
Mahadev Temple at Kurdi. The temple was translocated brick by brick when the locals learned that the village would be submerged.

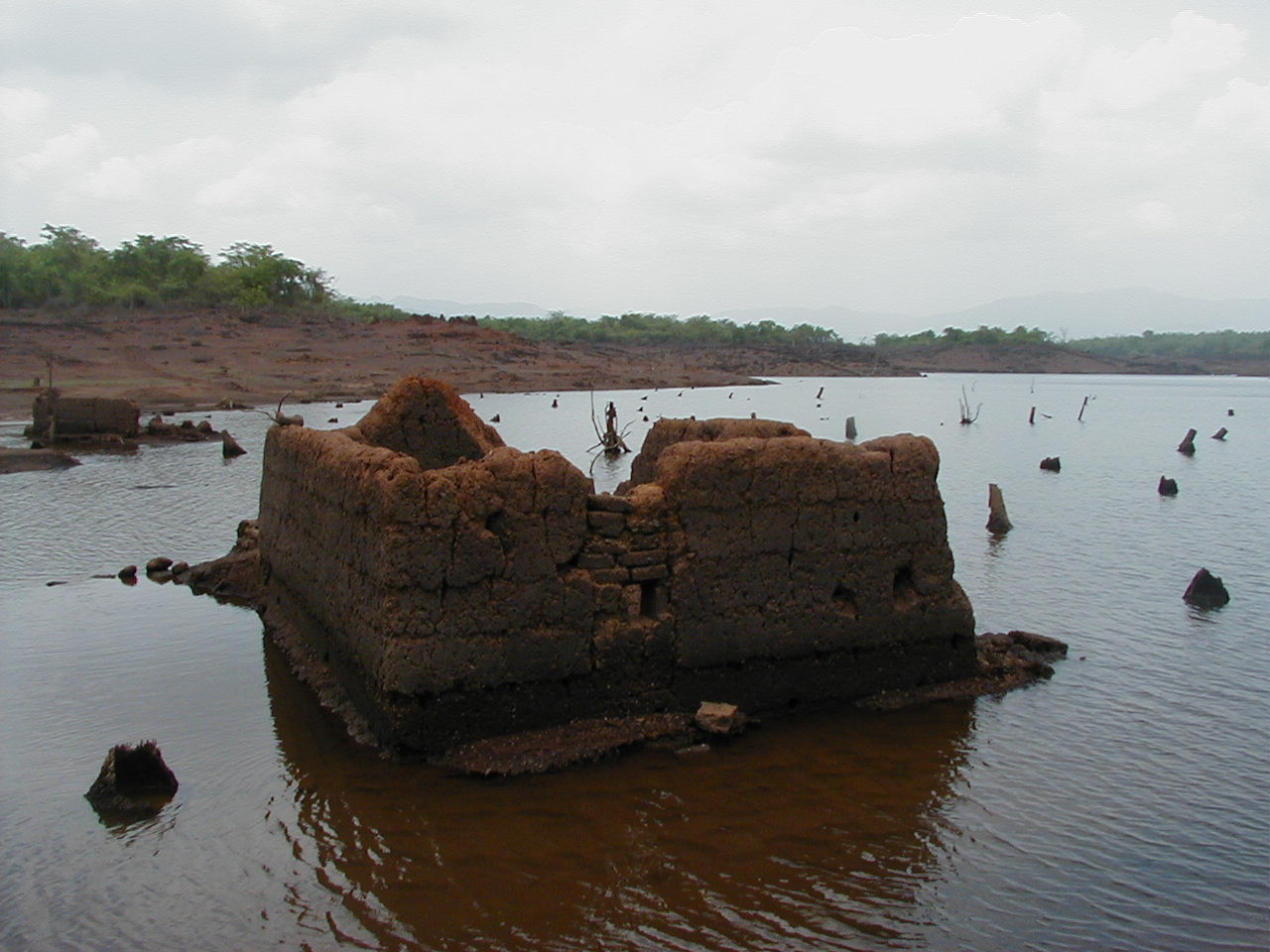
Remains of a structure

== See also ==
- Salaulim Dam
