= Galeria Akumulatory 2 =

Galeria Akumulatory 2 in Poznań was a Polish gallery exhibiting international art trends such as conceptual art or Fluxus from 1972 to 1990. It hosted numerous solo exhibitions by international conceptual artists and the Fluxus Festival in 1977. The gallery was founded and run by Jarosław Kozłowski, one of the representatives of Polish conceptual art.

Among others, artists exhibited in the Galeria Akumulatory 2 from 1972 - 1990 include:

- Eric Andersen
- Andrzej Bereziański
- John Blake
- Rene Block
- Włodzimierz Borowski
- Victor Burgin
- Carlfriedrich Claus
- Michael Craig-Martin
- COUM Transmissions
- Ebon Fisher
- Adam Garnek
- Geoffrey Hendricks
- John Hilliard
- Akira Komoto
- Hans-Werner Kalkmann
- Robin Klassnik
- Richard Long
- Yoko Ono
- Bogdan Perzynski
- Endre Tot
- Jacek Tylicki
- Emmett Williams
- Krzysztof Wodiczko
