= Rachel Martin (performance artist) =

- Born: December 14, 1954 (age 71)
- Occupations: Performance artist, draftsman, painter, printmaker, musician, writer

Rachel Martin (born December 14, 1954) is an American performance artist, draftsman, painter, printmaker, musician and writer based in Austin, Texas.

== Early life ==
Martin was born in Yuba City, California as Dee-Deborah Rachel Martin. She has also been known as Rachel Martin-Hinshaw.

== Education ==
Martin majored in English and took art and dance courses at University of North Texas in Denton and Texas Tech University in Lubbock prior to obtaining her BFA in studio art at the University of Texas at Austin.

During her student years in Austin, Martin worked with transmedia artists Bogdan Perzynski and Bill Lundberg and with performance artists Carolee Schneemann and Linda Montano. In 1994 she collaborated with Montano on a piece entitled Day without Art, performed at the University of Texas.

== Hard Women ==
Martin formed the performance art group Hard Women in 1990, which performed frequently in Austin, Houston and San Antonio until 1994. Martin and Suze Kemper, an original member of Hard Women, came together again for a number of performances in 2003. Martin's performances often involved performing on the accordion, on which she has been a virtuoso since childhood.

== Professional career ==
Martin has taught Performance Art at the University of Texas at Austin. Since 2003 Martin has been Assistant Dean for Student Affairs in the University of Texas at Austin, College of Fine Arts.

In 2007 Martin was honored by the National Academic Advising Association, South Central Region 7 Awards for Outstanding Advising Administrator- Certificate of Merit

In 1993 & 1998 Martin was honoured by the James W. Vick, Texas Excellence Awards for Academic Advising for her exceptional work with students. The award nominees are selected by students, and a student selection committee to recognize academic advisers "who have had an effective, positive influence on the educational experience of university students"

== Personal life ==
Martin's son, Jimmie D. Martin-Hinshaw, is also a performance artist based in Austin, Texas. Her eldest son, Nicholas is a social and environmental organizer and electric car consultant in the Bay Area, CA.

Her Boston Terrier, Buster (named after Buster Keaton) figures frequently in her drawings and paintings.
