= Galleri Sudurgata 7 =

Coordinates: 64.1466°N 21.9435°W

Galleri Sudurgata 7 was a conceptual and experimental art gallery active in Reykjavík, Iceland in the 1970s and 1980s.

The gallery closely collaborated with Fluxus artists including Eric Andersen, Robert Filliou, Mail artists like Robin Crozier and Endre TÓT and other Conceptual artists such as Dick Higgins, Maurizio Nannucci, Hreinn Fridfinnsson, Dieter Roth, Ruri, Peter Schmidt and Jacek Tylicki.

== Bibliography ==
- La Biennale di Venezia By Harald Szeemann, Cecilia Liveriero Lavelli, Lara Facco, Arsenale di Venezia, Chiara Barbieri, 2001
- Vanishing presence By Eugenia Parry, Eugenia Parry Janis, Max Kozloff, Adam D. Weinberg, Walker Art Center, ISBN 0-8478-1006-2, 1989
- Sacred spaces By Dominique Nahas, David L. Miller, Everson Museum of Art, 1987
- Landscapes from a high latitude By Julian Freeman, Brighton Polytechnic. Gallery, Listasafn Íslands, ISBN 0-85331-573-6, 1990
- Sleeping beauty—art now By Solomon R. Guggenheim Museum, 1982
- Island / Iceland, Zona no profit art space, Florence 1979
