= Endre Tot =

Hungarian artist (born 1937)

Endre Tot (Endre Tót) born in Sümeg, Hungary, 1937 is a Hungarian artist who lives and works in Berlin, Germany.

Tot participated in the Fluxus movement and is well known for his Mail art projects, the use of xerox copies and usage of rubber stamps with clear conceptual text declarations. In some of them Tot declares: "We are glad if we are happy". In 1999 he shows "Who's Afraid of Nothing? Absent images" at Museum Ludwig, Cologne, a continuation of a project called "Nothing is not nothing".

== The 1960s – Experiments in Informel ==
He studied at the Mural Department of the Hungarian College of Arts and Crafts from 1959 till 1965. He started to make informal paintings, an absolute novelty in Hungary, in the early '60s followed shortly by collages and works executed in the spirit of Pop Art and Minimal Art. He became attached in the mid-'60s to a leading but neglected Avant-Garde painter, Dezső Korniss who highly appreciated his pioneering informel ventures. In 1968 and 1969 he joined his young Neo-Avant-Garde colleagues named collectively the Iparterv Group of Artists at two scandalous exhibitions heavily criticised by officialdom. A retrospective of his early works was staged at the Budapest Kiscelli Museum in 1989, his early pencil and ink drawings were shown at Székesfehérvár's King Stephen Museum in 2003, while a comprehensive exhibition of his early works entitled "Early Works – from painted to unpainted pictures" at the Szombathely Gallery in 2004 presented most of his important works executed before his "My Unpainted Canvasses" (1970). After the political turn of 1989–1990 many of his major works executed back in the '60s were acquired by important Hungarian museums.

== The 1970s – The Beginnings of Concept Art ==
In 1970–71 he broke radically with painting and has since been pre-occupied with Concept Art. "Tót may well have possessed the most phenomenal painter talent among artists living East of Amsterdam. And yet, he voluntarily relinquished painting for the sake of a truth that he had gradually recognised to be even more important than painting." (Géza Perneczky, writing in Új Művészet, October, 2003) As a farewell to his painter period he prepared his artist's book "My Unpainted Canvasses" (1970), a virtual presentation of his canvasses never actually accomplished. Also in the early 70s, he evolved some of his basic ideas like "Nothing/Zer0", "Rains and Gladnesses" that were to permeate his works in subsequent decades. The new media he employed in his art include telegrams, picture postcards, T-shirts, Xerox copies, typewriters, films, music, posters, graffiti, banners, actions, artist's books, street newsreels.

Critics recognised his early "Absent Works" published by Cologne-based DuMont Verlag ("Aktuelle Kunst in Ost-Europa", 1972) to be the first conceptual works stemming from Eastern-Europe, works that were to be greatly enhanced in subsequent decades. Some other conceptual works of his were also published in Achille Bonito Oliva's "Europe/America: The Different Avant-Garde" (Milan, 1976). "He entered the stage of mail art almost in the very first hour", wrote Jean-Marc Poinsot in his catalogue of 1971 entitled "Mail Art-Communication - A Distance-Concept". His fellow mail art correspondents included his later friend Ben Vautier, John Armleder, George Brecht, Daniel Spoerri, Cosey Fanny Tutti, Genesis P-Orridge, Dieter Roth, Marina Abramovich, Ken Friedmann and his dog. His mail art was exhibited at the Paris Bi-Annual of 1972 together with art by such other mail art pioneers as Marcel Duchamp, Yves Klein, Richard Johnson, Ben Vautier, George Brecht. About his letters written with a zero code Pierre Restany, a friend of Yves Klein's, wrote this in 1978: "In the immaterial zone of a concentrated (ZEROED) sensitivity Endre Tót appears to be the Yves Klein of mail art, a monochrome of postage." His first museum exhibition was staged by the Israel Museum in 1975. Since Hungary had severed its diplomatic relations with Israel in 1967, Tót was forced to smuggle his works out of Hungary in an adventurous way. His conceptual works (e.g. his Rainproof-ideas) executed between 1970 and 1974 were exhibited there simultaneously with Alberto Giacometti's statues. Art magazines in Germany, Italy, and France took note of the exhibition with the Jerusalem Post commenting: "This is not to say that Endre Tot is the same race with Giacometti, but he is a totally new and rewarding experience."

In 1974, the Swiss Howeg Verlag published his sheet of stamps called Zero-Post among the first artist's stamps of international mail art.

At the invitation of John Armleder, his later friend who became world-famous for his Neo Geo movement, he spent half a year with the Ecart Gallery of Geneva, an institution also functioning as a mail art centre. It was during his stay in Geneva that he accomplished his first street action (TOTalJoys 1976) which was filmed and later issued on DVD by the Paris Bureau des Videos in 2005.

His artist's books made in Budapest in the 70s earned him quite a lot of international praise. He had first published them on a samizdat basis but they were later republished by Western-European Avant-Garde publishers. 1971: "My Unpainted Canvasses", "The States of Zeros", "Semmi sem semmi / Nothing ain't Nothing", 1972: "Nothing", "Incomplete Informations", 1974: "Zero-Texts (1971-72)", "Night Visit to the National Gallery" (Beau Geste Press, UK), "Zero-Post", "Rainproof Ideas (1971-74)", 1979: "TÓTalJOYS", 1981: "Very Special Drawings", 1990: "Evergreen Book". In 1998, the Paris Bibliothèque Nationale bought several of his artist's books. The library of the Paris Pompidou Centre acquired his Correspondence avec John Armleder (Ecart, Geneva, 1974) in 2010. His artist's books were exhibited in many European, American and Canadian museums including the Pompidou Centre's "Livres d'Artistes" exhibition of 1985. He was still a resident of Budapest when, in 1977, he exhibited with Galerie Bama, one of the best-known Paris galleries. His show was reviewed in L 'Express by Otto Hahn. Due to his international actions and mail art activities he counted in the West as one of the most notable Eastern-European artists, an appraisal hardly acknowledged in his native country. He was plucked from the isolation of his Óbuda apartment in the late 70s by an invitation coming from the Artist-in-Berlin of DAAD. His applications for an exit permit had been refused by the authorities several times which created a political sensation in the Western press, a circumstance that eventually earned him a permit. After staying in Berlin for a year Tót opted for emigration. His Óbuda apartment was confiscated but his sibling had evacuated his works stored there in the nick of time. After being stored in various low-key places, they were eventually deposited with the Hungarian National Gallery in an orderly fashion.

It was in West-Berlin that Tót came to realise the ideas that he had taken with him in his suitcase and in his mind from Budapest. Shortly after arriving, he placed the following inscription upon the Berlin Wall: "Ich würde mich freuen, wenn ich etwas auf die andere Seite der Mauer schreiben dürfte" (I should be glad if I were allowed to write something on the other side of this wall). He demonstrated his joys ("TÓTalJOYs") with posters in his hand or upon his back in the busiest spots of the metropolis. He even placed a flickering sentence speaking about his joy among the news items of a street newsreel atop a Kurfürstendamm building. In 1978 DAAD filmed and published in book form his street action named TOTalJOYS. He twice exhibited his works with Galerie René Block, an institution previously hosting such notables as Joseph Beuys, Richard Hamilton, Allan Kaprow, Nam June Paik, Wolf Vostell. The irony inherent in his actions and mail art definitely links him up with the fluxus movement in Germany. He was the sole Eastern-European protagonist of the itinerant exhibition organised by René Block entitled "Fluxus in Germany 1962-1992".

== The 1980s – Blackout in Cologne ==
After a stay of one and a half years in Berlin he moved to Cologne with his German wife Herta. The first years of his Cologne period were much less productive than his stay in Berlin. He hardly ever worked until the mid-80s. Invited by Artist Place, he flew to New York City in 1982 with a piece of chalk in his pocket that he used for placing graffiti on the walls of the gallery. It was here that he met up with a great number of notable artists including Alan Kaprow and his friend of old, John Armleder.

With the "blackout years" gone, as he himself called them, he started to work again feverishly from the late 80s on. He elaborated on the idea of "absent paintings", an idea dating back to his Budapest years (My Unpainted Canvasses, 1970, Night Visit to the National Gallery, A Visit to the Museum, both in 1974). With his "absent paintings" he accomplished a virtual return to painting but this was tantamount in his case to its final destruction. The spirit nurturing his Blackout and Catalogued paintings comes from an aesthetics of dearth. Conceived in an aesthetics of disappearance, his "absent" works attempt to visualise nothing and void itself. His large work entitled "Dada Messe in Berlin" was exhibited at the show ICONOCLASH: Beyond the Image Wars in Science, Religion and Art (ZKM, Karlsruhe, 2002) presenting major iconoclastic works by Dürer, Rembrandt, Goya, Duchamp, Malevich, Picabia, Warhol, Beuys etc. At the Bremen exhibition "Who Killed the Painting?" (Museum für Moderne Kunst, 2010) his large triptych "Fluxus Triptichon" (2002, 3 x 200 x 125 cm) was on view alongside works by Beuys, Kaprow, Ben Vautier, G. Brecht, Al Hausen, Nam June Paik etc.

== The 1990s – Retrospectives and Entering the Canon ==
After the political change of 1989-1990 in Hungary Tót returned to his native country with his works created abroad. He filled all 12 exhibiting halls of the Palace of the Arts with them under the evocative title of "Nothing is Nothing". Four years later he exhibited with the Cologne Ludwig Museum (Who is afraid of Nothing?), and this selection of his works was re-exhibited with the Budapest branch of the Ludwig Museum in 1999. Tót is the first Hungarian artist to have been asked to put on an individual show at the Kassel Documenta. Curators there insisted on using the Hungarian title of his Budapest show (Semmi sem semmi) probably because they liked its exotic sound. His action on the city's main square involving him distributing flyers with a black mask hiding his face was cut short by the police even though the flyers contained no information at all. Along with his works accomplished in his studio, his street actions have also helped him achieve international fame.

"I am glad that I have stood here" – this was inscribed in Hungarian on his bronze plaque placed in the pavement in 1998 in front of Artpool's art space in Budapest (60, Paulay Ede St.). Six years later a similarly inscribed plaque ("Ich freue mich, dass ich hier gestanden habe") was placed in the floor of the roof terrace of the Cologne Ludwig Museum.

His Flyer, Zero, Joy etc. street actions as satellite events to international exhibitions have embarrassed or enraged passers-by in many cities over the decades, not infrequently causing even the police to intervene. International critics usually evaluate those anti-demonstrations by Tót to be responses to the mandatory political demonstrations that he had lived through as a young man in totalitarian Hungary.

== The 2000s ==
A photo documentation of Tót's earliest street action was exhibited at the international show "Protest & Survive" put on by the famous London Whitechapel Gallery. Requested by the curators, he also re-staged his remarkable Geneva street action. The catalogue said this about his actions: "Tót's response to the censorship, isolation and suppression inherent in a totalitarian state was to produce his series of joy". At the exhibition staged by the Vienna Kunstforum entitled "Superstars von Warhol bis Madonna" (2005) his conceptual paperwork "depicting" or rather just marking Mona Lisa's (absent) smile was on view alongside Marcel Duchamp's famous moustached Mona Lisa.

The New York Museum of Modern Art (MoMA) had acquired several works of his created during his Budapest isolation and exhibited them in 2006 at its show "Eye on Europe – 1960 to Now". Along with Czech artist Milan Knizak, Tót was the only exhibiting artist coming from Eastern Europe.

Two years later MoMA director Glenn D. Lowry presented an Honorary Artist Membership to him.

In 2009 he published a memoir entitled "I'm glad that I can write one sentence after another" with Noran Publishers, Budapest. A critic wrote this about the book: "This is half-way between a logbook and an autonomous work of art since the primacy of the text is questioned throughout by its unusual layout and illustrations... The account Tót gives of his youthful love-affair is deeply moving, the way he recalls the relationship of the regime towards its artists in the 60s and 70s, convincing, and the list of his fleeting affairs with girls is very funny."

== The 2010s – Tót in Collections ==
In 2010 he exhibited with such wide-ranging institutions as Neues Museum Nürnberg, Museum für Moderne Kunst Wesenburg - Bremen, Centre Georges Pompidou Paris, The V. Koc Foundation Contemporary Art Collection Istanbul. The Pompidou Centre's catalogue published a copy of his 1975 letter to Pierre Restany ending with the words: "So I'm fucked with my zer0000000000000s". Simultaneously, the Institut Hongrois, the Hungarian Cultural Center in Paris staged a show of the Iparterv Group of Artists (Le Progrés de l'Illusion), where Tót's early (1966/67) informal paintings and paperworks were also on view.

He has also been invited to a number of major international thematic exhibitions, the most important of those is the British Museum Artists ’poscard from 1960 to now exhibition in 2018, which featured 12 “Rain-pieces” from Tót. In 2017, the third German museum solo show of Endre Tót's works was installed at the Schwerin State Museum with the title zer0 makes me glad sad mad, but in recent years he had also had solo exhibitions in Paris, Milan, Vienna and Budapest. Following the invitation of the Palazzo delle Expositioni 2019 he traveled to Rome for the exhibition Techiche d'Evasione, a show featuring works of the Hungarian Neo-Avant-Garde and presenting a variety many of Tót's early conceptual works from the early 1970s.

His conceptual works were acquired from 1975 through 2010 by such major collections as those of MoMA New York, Getty Museum Los Angeles, Museum Ludwig Cologne, Neue Nationalgalerie Berlin, Israel Museum Jerusalem, Gemeentemuseum The Hague, and the Budapest Museum of Fine Arts as well as East-Central European museums like National Gallery Prague, Museum Stuki Łódź, Museum of Modern Art Ljubljana, National Gallery of Art Varsaw, Museum of Modern Art Olmütz, Hungarian National Gallery, Ludwig Museum Budapest, or even two museums in Latin-America: the Center de Arte y Communication (CAYC) Buenos Aires, and the Museu de Arte Contemporaneu da Universidade de São Paulo.

Probably more than a hundred of his major works are preserved in such notable private collections as Sammlung Dr. Speck (Cologne), Sammlung René Block (Berlin), Das Archive Sohm (Stuttgart), The Sacker Archive of Concrete and Visual Poetry (Miami Beach, Florida).

After his retrospective exhibition 2012 in MODEM, Endre Tót almost completely terminated working in the studio and has been mainly focusing on street actions and "demos". On the occasion of the retrospective he organized a Zer0 demo with the participation of young people from Debrecen. This was Endre Tót's first public action in Hungary. One year later, on May 2, 2013 a large-scale Zer0 demo was implemented in Budapest with the support of nearly 200 young artists and friends. The demonstration took place on Budapest's most impressive boulevard, the Andrássy út and was escorted by the police. Further Zer0 demos took place 2015 in Cologne during Art Cologne (April 17, 2015), followed by a demonstration during his solo exhibition in Hamburg (8. September 2015). These rallies were of performative nature. Taking on the concept of his Gladness-demos in Bonn, Paris and Amsterdam during the 1970s and 1980s, in autumn of 2017 Endre Tót realized the first Gladness Demonstration in Budapest within the framework of the OFF Biennale, also on Andrássy út. In contrast to his early demonstrations with a few dozen participants in Western Europe, in 2017 he was able to spectacularly visualize the parade with the help of more than a hundred participants (October 8, 2017). Participants carried their own laughing portraits laminated on a large board as protest signs, while at the beginning of the parade there was a huge banner: ÖRÜLÜNK HOGY DEMONSTRÁLHATUNK (We are glad if we can demonstrate). A limited edition DVD was released of each demo.

During the COVID-19 pandemic in 2020, a well-known UK publisher, Show & Tell Editions, released a 75-copy edition of a non surgical face mask by Endre Tót with the sign TÒTalJOY.

== Awards and recognitions, scholarships ==
- Drawing Triennale, Wroclaw, 1974, 1977, 1992
- Lisbon International Show, Lisbon, 1979
- DAAD Artist-in-Berlin scholarship, West-Berlin, 1978/79
- Studio grant, Stedelijk Museum, Amsterdam, 1980
- Arbeitsstipendium, Kunstfonds e. v., Bonn, 1990
- Honorary Artist Membership, Whitchapel Art Gallery, London, 2005
- Munkácsy Mihály Award, Budapest, 2006
- Special Award, 48th Autumn Salon, Belgrade, 2006
- Honorary Artist Membership, Museum of Modern Art, New York, 2008
- Kossuth Award, Budapest, 2009

== Solo exhibitions (selection) ==
- 1966 Epitők Müszaki Klubja. Budapest
- 1973 Fluxus West. San Diego
- 1975 Israel Museum, Jerusalem
- 1975 Galeria Akumulatory 2, Poznań, Poland
- 1976 Galerie Bama, Paris
- 1976 Galerie St. Petri, Lund, Sweden
- 1978 Galleri Sudurgata 7, Reykyavik, Iceland
- 1979 Galerie René Block. West-Berlin
- 1981 Artothek. Cologne
- 1982 Young Fluxus, Artists Space, New York
- 1990 Cologne Kunstverein (with Martin Kippenberger), Cologne
- 1991 Kunsthalle Szombathely, Hungary
- 1991 Galerie Berndt, Cologne
- 1995 Nothing is not nothing, Retrospective (1965-1995). Kunsthalle Budapest
- 1996 Gallery Hundertmark, Cologne
- 1999 Who's Afraid of Nothing? Absent images. Museum Ludwig, Cologne
- 1999 Who's Afraid of Nothing? Abwesende Bilder / Absent Pictures, Museum Ludwig, Köln
- 1999 Nem félünk a semmitől, Kortárs Művészeti Múzeum – Ludwig Múzeum, Budapest
- 2002 Galerie Foth, Freiburg
- 2003 Korai munkák (1964–1968), Szent István Király Múzeum, Székesfehérvár, Hungary
- 2004 A festett képtől a meg nem festett képig - korai munkák 1965-1970, Szombathelyi Képtár, Szombathely, Hungary
- 2006 Nichts ist nicht Nichts, Museum Fridericianum, Kassel
- 2012 Nagyon speciális örömök (Very Special Joys), Modem Kunsthalle, Debrecen, Hungary
- 2013 National Theater, Budapest
- 2017 Endre Tót. Zer0 makes me glad sad mad, Staatliches Museum Schwerin, Germany
- 2017 Amir Shariat Galerie, Vienna
- 2017 Very Special Gladnesses, Robert Capa Contemporary Photography Center, Budapest
- 2019 Pertu No 13 – Endre Tót – Monogramista T.D, Galéria umenia Ernesta Zmetáka, Nové Zámky.
- 2019 Loom Gallery, Milan
- 2019 Layout paintings 1988-1991, acb Gallery, Budapest
- 2020 Very Special Gladnesses, Galerie Salle Principale, Paris

== Group exhibitions (selection) ==
- 1965-70 Károly Ferenczy Museum. Szentendre
- 1968 Iparterv I. exhibition, Iparterv hall, Budapest
- 1969 Iparterv II. exhibition, Iparterv hall, Budapest
- 1971 VII Biennale de Paris (Envois Section). Parc Floral de Paris. Paris
- 1972 FLUXshoe, (traveling exhibition in England), Cullompton, Devon, Oxford
- 1974 IV British International Print Biennale, Bradford
- 1976 Artist's Books, I.C.E., London (and British Tour)
- 1976 The Artist and the Photograph, The Israel Museum, Jerusalem
- 1978 Mona Lisa im 20. Jahrhundert, Wilhelm Lehmbruck Museum, Duisburg
- 1978 Artist's Books, Centolibri d’artista cento, Palazzo Strozzi, Florence
- 1979 daadgalerie, West-Berlin
- 1980 Cologne Kunstverein, Cologne
- 1981 Books by Artists, National Gallery of Canada, Ottawa
- 1982 Young Fluxus, Artists’ Space, New York
- 1984 International Artists Committee - Exhibition, Museum Fridericianum, Kassel
- 1985 Livres d’Artistes, Centre George Pompidou, Paris
- 1989 Fluxus and Friends, University of Iowa, Iowa Museum of Art, Iowa
- 1994 Fluxubritannica, Tate Gallery, London
- 1995 Fluxus: A long story with many knots. Fluxus in Germany 1962-94 (travelling exhibition, until 2004)
- 1997 Mail Art: Eastern Europe in International Network, Staatliches Museum, Schwerin
- 1999 Chronos and Kairos. Fridericianum, Kassel
- 1999 Aspect/Position – 50 Jahre Kunst aus Mitteleuropa 1949–99, Museum Moderne Kunst, Stiftung Ludwig, Wien
- 2000 Protest & Survive. Whitechapel Art Gallery, London
- 2000 The Art of Eastern Europe in Dialogue with the West – from the I96Os to the present, Museum of Modern Art, Ljubljana.
- 2001 Extra Article A Survey of Artists, 1960-1999 Ephemena. California College of Arts & Crafts, San Francisco
- 2002 Iconoclash. Beyond the Image Wars in Science, Religion and Art. ZKM – Center for Art and Media, Karlsruhe
- 2005 Superstars. Von Andy Warhol bis Madonna, Kunsthalle und Kunstforum, Vienna
- 2006 Eye on Europe – 1960 to Now, Museum of Modern Art, New York
- 2007 Fluxus East, Bethanien, Berlin
- 2008 Procession in Art, Museum voor Moderne Kunst, Arnheim
- 2009 Werke aus der Sammlung Block. Neues Museum, Nürnberg
- 2010 Who killed the painting?, Museum für moderne Kunst, Weserburg, Bremen
- 2010 Les Promesse du Passé, Centre George Pompidou, Paris
- 2010 Starter – Works from the Vehbi Koc Foundation Contemporary Art Collection, Arter, Istanbul
- 2011 Museum of Parallel Narratives. In the framework of L'Internationale, Museu d'Art Contemporani, Barcelona
- 2012 Atlas critique, Parc Saint Léger, Centre d’artcontemporain, Paris
- 2013 The Unanswered Question. İskele 2, n.b.k és TANAS, Berlin
- 2017 With the Eyes of Others: Hungarian Artists of the Sixties and Seventies, Elisabeth Dee, New York
- 2019 Iparterv 50+, Ludwig Múzeum, Budapest
- 2019 The word exists to be put on a postcard: artists' postcard from 1960 to now, British Museum, London
- 2019 Evasion techniques, Hungarian Avant-garde in the 1960s and 1970s, Palazzo delle Esposizioni, Rome
- 2022 Great Patriotic, with Hanna Shumska, Vitalii Shupliak, Celina Kanunnikava, BWA Bydgoszcz, Poland

== Actions in public space ==
- 1972 I'm glad if I can stamp in Warsaw too, Galeria Foksal, Warsaw
- 1973 After 1/2 a minute I shall say something, Galeria Adres, Łódz
- 1976 TÓTalJOYs, Galerie Ecart, Genoa
- 1979 I'm glad if I can type zerOs (Ben Vautier: Hotel Room Event), Hotel Steiner, West-Berlin
- 1980 Wir freuen uns, wenn wir demonstrieren können, Bonn
- 1980 Outdoor Texts, Amsterdam
- 1981 Zer0-Demo, Viersen
- 1991 Zer0-Demo, Oxford
- 2000 We are glad if we can demonstrate, Whitechapel Art Gallery, London
- 2000 TÓTaIJOYS, Whitechapel Art Gallery, London
- 2002 Very Special Gladnesses. 4 Jahre: Fluxus und die Folgen, Wiesbaden
- 2002 Wir sind immer sehr froh... Fluxus in Deutschland 1962–94, Museum Fridericianum, Kassel
- 2006 Flyer Aktion, Kassel
- 2006 Zer0-Flyer Aktion, Belgrade
- 2007 Joy-Flyer Aktion, Berlin
- 2008 Zer0-Flyer Aktion, Tallinn
- 2012 Zer0-Demo, Debrecen, Hungary
- 2013 Zer0-Demo, Budapest
- 2015 Zer0-Demo, Köln
- 2015 Zer0-Demo, Hamburg
- 2017 Zer0-Demo, Schwerin
- 2017 Gladness Demo / Örülünk, hogy demonstrálhatunk, Budapest

== Works in public collections (selection) ==
- Museum Ludwig, Cologne
- Tate Gallery, London
- British Museum, London
- Hungarian National Gallery, Budapest
- Museum of Fine Arts, Budapest
- Israel Museum, Jerusalem
- Bibliothèque nationale de France, Paris
- Neue Nationalgalerie, Berlin
- National Museum, Warsaw
- Institute for Foreign Cultural Relations, Stuttgart
- Musée national d'art moderne, Centre George Pompidou, Paris
- Biblithéque Kandinsky, Centre George Pompidou, Paris
- Museum of Modern Art (MoMA), New York
- The J. Paul Getty Museum, Los Angeles
- San Francisco Museum of Modern Art (SFMOMA), San Francisco
- Museu d'Art Contemporani de Barcelona (MACBA), Barcelona
- Sammlung zeitgenössischer Kunst der Bundesrepublik Deutschland, Bonn
- Gemeentemuseum, Hága
- Museum van Hedendaagse Kunst, Antwerpen (MuHKA)
- Museu de Arte Contemporânea da Universidade de São Paulo, São Paulo
- Centro de Arte y Comunicación (CAyC), Buenos Aires
- Národní galerie Praha, Prága
- The Olmouz Museum of Modern Art, Olomouc
- Muzeum Sztuki, Łódź
- Museum of Modern Art (MG+MSUM), Ljubljana
- The Museum of Contemporary Art, Zagreb
- Ludwig Múzeum, Budapest
- FRAC des Pays de la Loire, Carquefou
- Centre des livres d'artistes, Saint-Yrieix-la Perche
- Centre national des arts plastiques, France
- Kiscelli Múzeum, Budapest
- Artpool, Budapest
- Szent István Király Múzeum, Székesfehérvár
- Szombathelyi Képtár, Szombathely
- Jannus Pannonius Múzeum, Pécs
- MODEM Modern és Kortárs Művészeti Központ, Debrecen
- Modern Képtár, Művészetek háza, Veszprém

== Bibliography ==
- Tót Endre: Nagyon speciális örömök – Retrospektív 1971-2011 / Endre Tót: Very Special Joys – Retrospective 1971-2011, MODEM, Debrecen, 2012 ISBN 978-963-89271-6-3
- Global conceptualism: points of origin, 1950s-1980s, Queens Museum of Art, 1999. ISBN 978-0-9604514-9-4
- Contemporary artists, Joann Cerrito, St. James Press, 1996. ISBN 978-1-55862-183-1
- Fluxus virus, 1962-1992, Galerie Schüppenhauer, 1992
- Contemporary Artists, St. James Press, 2002. ISBN 1-55862-488-0
- The Art of performance: a critical anthology ISBN 0-525-48039-0
- Flash Art, No. 66-67, Venice Biennale Issue, 1976

== Books by Endre Tot ==
- 1971 nothing, Samizdat-Edition, Budapest
- 1971 STAMPED BY ENDRE TÓT, Samizdat-Edition, Budapest
- 1971 Semmi Sem Semmi, Samizdat-Edition, Budapest
- 1971 My Unpainted Canvases, Samizdat-Edition, Budapest
- 1971 THE STATES OF ZERO
- 1972 Possessive Adjective
- 1972 ABSOLUTE POSSESSIVE PRONOUNS
- 1972 TEN QUESTIONS by Endre Tót
- 1972 Incomplete Information verbal & visual
- 1973 Exercise
- 1973 On the next page I shall say something
- 1973 DZIESIEĆ PYTAŃ
- 1973 I am glad if I can write sentences, one after the other
- 1973 ONE DOZEN RAIN POSTCARDS (1971-73)
- 1974 Zero-Texts (1971-72)
- 1974 ZEROPOST (noir)
- 1974 Night visit to the National Gallery, Beau Geste Press (1974). ISBN 0-85998-005-7
- 1974 Correspondance avec John Armleder, Ecart Publications, Genève
- 1974 TÓTal Questions by TÓT
- 1974 COLOURED DAYS
- 1974 one dozen rain pOstCarDs (1971-73)
- 1974 ½ Dozen incomplete visual informations on...
- 1975 NULLIFIED DIALOGUE
- 1975 Rainproof Ideas (1971–74), The Israel Museum, Jérusalem
- 1975 STARS FROM POLAND
- 1976 Zer0-Post, Ecart Publications, Genf / Howeg – Verlag, Hinwil
- 1977 TÓTal zer0s (1973-1977)
- 1977 Gladness Writings (1973 - 1976)
- 1977 DIRTY RAINS, Edition J. Sellem, Lund, Schweden
- 1979 TÓTaIJOYs, Rainer Verlag, Berlin / Berliner Künstlerprogramm des DAAD, Berlin-ouest
- 1979 1/2 DOZEN BERLINER GLADNESS POSTCARDS
- 1979 Ten Documents (1973 - 80)
- 1981 Very Special Drawings, Rainer Verlag, Berlin
- 1981 Book of an extremely glad artist, (German Edition), Rainer (1981), ISBN 3-88537-036-0
- 1983 From Cologne some JECKE DINGE to you, everybody and nobody
- 1983 Stamps 1971-83
- 1984 SPECIAL DRAWINGS - PRIVATE SPACE
- 1990 Evergreen Book for everybody nobody and me
- 1991 Masterpieces from Cimabue to Warhol(1971-89)
- 1999 Who's Afraid of Nothing, Museum Ludwig, Cologne
- 2006 Nichts ist nicht Nichts, Museum Fridericianum, Kassel
- 2009 "I'm glad if I can write one sentence after another", Noran (2009)(In Hungarian)
