= Now Gallery =

Former American art gallery

Now Gallery was a New York City art gallery based in East Village, Manhattan active from 1983 - 1989. It was a cultural concept of artist and art curator, Jacek Tylicki.

Co-operating with Fashion Moda in the Bronx and along with the Fun Gallery, Now Gallery introduced New York Street art and Graffiti into the mainstream art world. The Now Gallery initiated the East Village art boom of the 1980s.
