= Galerie St. Petri =

Galerie St. Petri is a Conceptual art gallery situated in Lund, Sweden. It was opened by Jean Sellem, a French artist who immigrated to Sweden in the 1970s and is a professor of Art history at Lund University.

In the 1970s the gallery called: "Galerie S:t Petri - Archive of Experimental and Marginal Art" quickly became an international Conceptual art and Performance art space, closely collaborating with Fluxus artists like Eric Andersen, Ken Friedman and Tomas Schmit as well as organizing individual exhibitions of works by artists such as Christian Boltanski, Henck van Dijck, John Fekner, Arne Groh, Jarosław Kozłowski, Yoko Ono, Nam June Paik, Carel Lanters, Endre TÓT, Horst Tress, Jacek Tylicki and Krzysztof Wodiczko among others.

The gallery closed in 1982 due to financial reasons.

== Bibliography ==
- Jean Sellem, (ed.): Fluxus Research, Lund Art Press, Vol. 2, No. 2, 1991
- Jean Sellem, Hardy Strid's Work and Swedish modernism in art from 1935 to 1980. (ISBN 3923091001)
- The Fluxus reader By Ken Friedman, ISBN 0-471-97858-2, page Page 171
- Encyclopedia of aesthetics By Michael Kelly, Oxford University Press, 1998 v. 4, Page 294
