= Celina Kanunnikava =

Polish-Belarusian artist

Celina Kanunnikava is a Polish-Belarusian artist. Her works are in the collection of Museum of Modern Art, Warsaw, and in private collections in Poland and abroad.

== Work ==
Kanunnikava's artworks span painting, computer graphics, and mixed media/installations. They are inspired by architecture and physical materials characteristic for totalitarian regimes, such as widespread use of concrete, gold, and marble. The paintings depict gigantic buildings of the regime power and control infrastructure, including prisons, secret police archives, official buildings, headquarters, and bureaus of official propaganda media. The objects and buildings depicted symbolize not just Belarusian regime but other similar power relations and systems.

The artist is engaged in charity auctions and initiatives in both Belarus and Poland.

== Awards ==
- "Nowy obraz/Nowe spojrzenie" (UAP Poznań) - main prize (2014)
- Winner of President of Wrocław Award in the 12th edition of Geppert Competition, Wrocław, 2016
- Medal of Young Art, Poznań, 2017
- 11. Triennale of Small Art Forms in Toruń, 2019 – III prize
- Compass of Young Art, Warsaw, 2020

== Selected exhibitions ==
=== Solo exhibitions ===
- Internal Diseases, Assembly Gallery, Poznań, Poland
- Internal Diseases, MBWA, Leszno, Poland, 2017
- The Untitled, Assembly Gallery, Poznań, Poland, 2016
- Masse und Macht / Mass and power, WOZOWNIA Gallery, Toruń, Poland, 2016
- 47 milliseconds, Szyperska Gallery, Poznań, Poland, 2013
- What a beautiful, sunny day, Stara Rzeźnia Gallery, Poznań, Poland, 2012

=== Group ===
- Great Patriotic, with Endre Tot, Hanna Shumska, Vitalii Shupliak, BWA Bydgoszcz, Poland, 2022
- 21 Presentations - Leszno 2020. In the beginning, the weather changed MBWA Leszno, Poland, 2020
- A thing about collecting. What is all this for? MBWA Leszno, Poland, 2020
- Paint, also known as Blood. Women, Affect, and Desire in Contemporary Painting, Museum of Modern Art, Warsaw, Poland, 2019
- The sadness of modernism: oppression and depression, City Gallery, Wrocław, Poland, 2019
- Girl and gun, House of Colonels, La Oliva, Fuerteventura, Spain, 2018
- Island and Atolls: the Mapping of Imagination, WOZOWNIA Gallery, Toruń, Poland, 2017
- The Next Day, Assembly Gallery, Poznań, Poland, 2016
- Love. Aids. Riot. Sex. III, Kunstquartier Bethanien, Berlin, Germany, 2014
