= Palolem Beach =

- Beach
- Front view of the beach, 2024

- Location within Goa Location within India
- Coordinates: 15.009°N 74.021°E
- Country: India
- State: Goa
- City: Chaudi
- Activities: Swimming Fishing, Parasailing, Boat rides
- Lifeguards: YES, on duty

Palolem Beach is in Canacona in Kushavati district, Goa, India.

== Overview ==
Palolem Beach is largely unspoiled and is inhabited by both local fishermen and by foreign tourists, who live in shacks along the shore or in the main village itself. It is about one mile (approximately 1.61 km) long and is crescent-shaped; one can view the entire beach from either end. Both ends of the beach consist of rocks jutting out into the sea. The depth of the sea increases gradually, being shallowest at the northern end of the beach, making it safe for average swimmers, and the currents are not fast.

In 2026, Palolem Beach was named the best beach in Asia and the sixth best beach in the world in the Beach.com Global Beach Index 2026. It was the only beach from Asia in the world's top 25. The index judged 322 beaches on 18 measures, using the views of 58 experts and more than 93,000 Google Maps reviews.

== Location ==
Palolem Beach is located at 15°00′36″N 74°01′24″E, within 2.5 kilometres of the market town of Chaudi in Kushavati district, and about 40 minutes from Margao, the district headquarters of South Goa.

Other neighbouring beaches in South Goa include Agonda Beach and Patnem Beach.

== Travel ==
The nearest airport is Dabolim Airport, around 67 km away. The nearest railway station is at Canacona, which can be reached from the major Madgoan junction railway station in just 30 mins. There are bus services every half an hour between Palolem beach and the Kadamba Transport Corporation (KTC) Bus Depot in Margao. The nearest KTC depot is at Canacona.

== Gallery ==
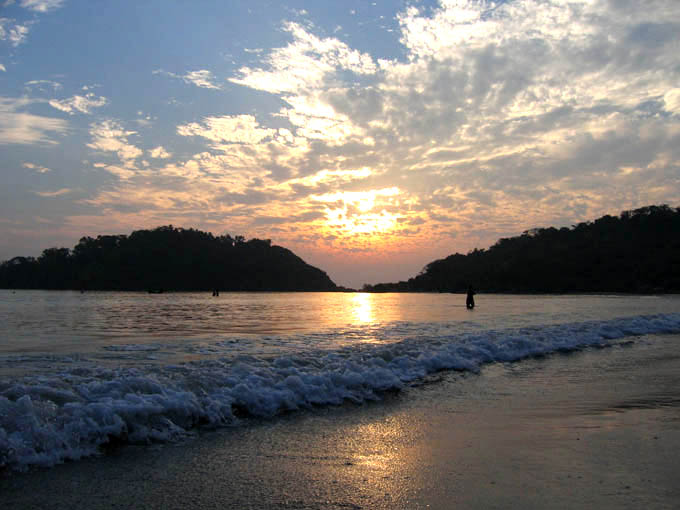
Sunset at Palolem

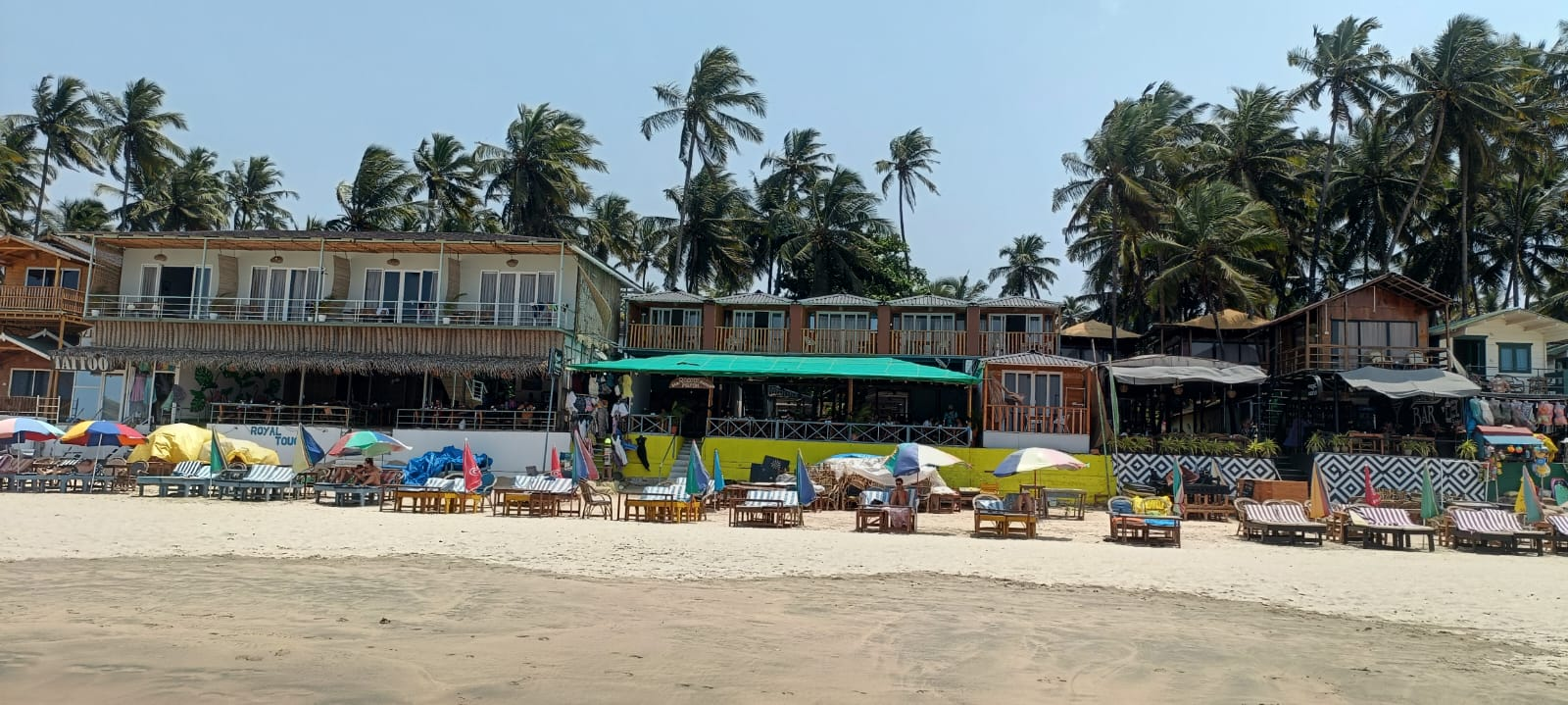
Resorts on Palolem Beach, Goa

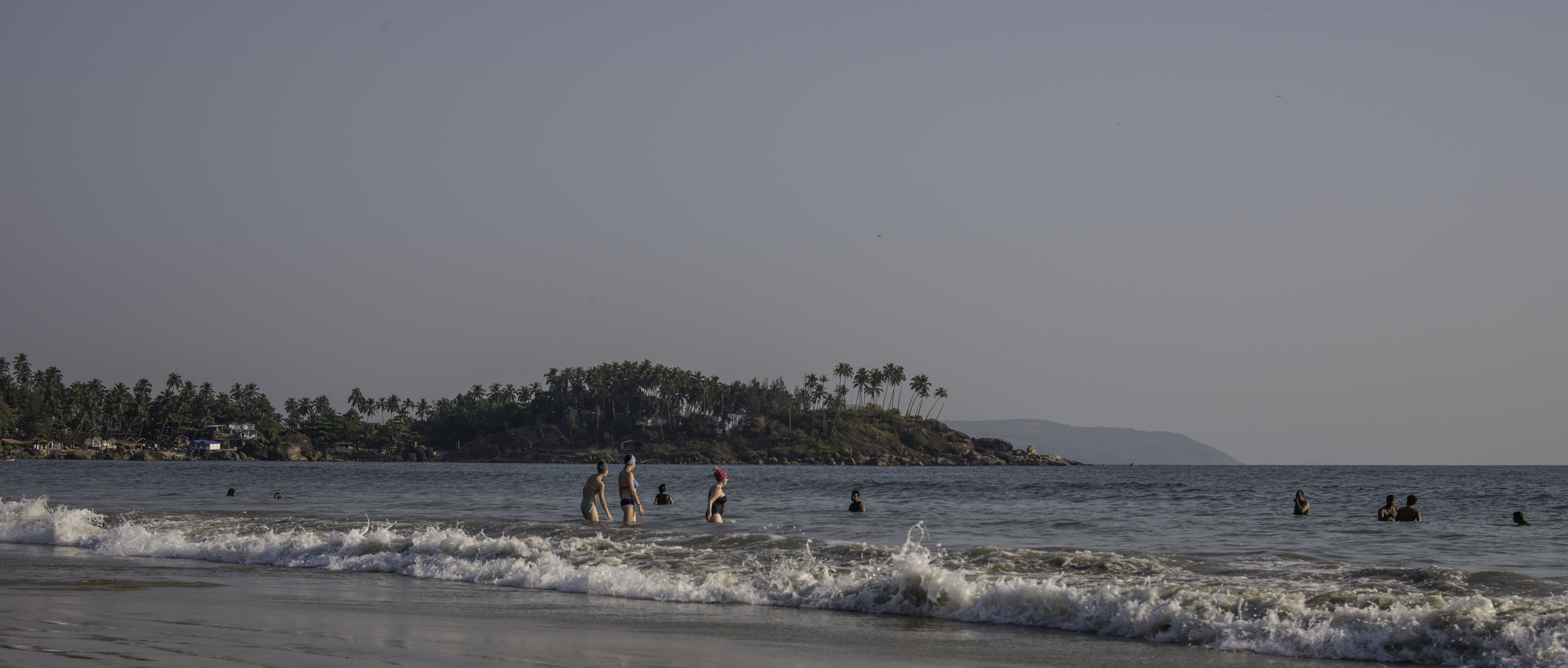
View of the beach

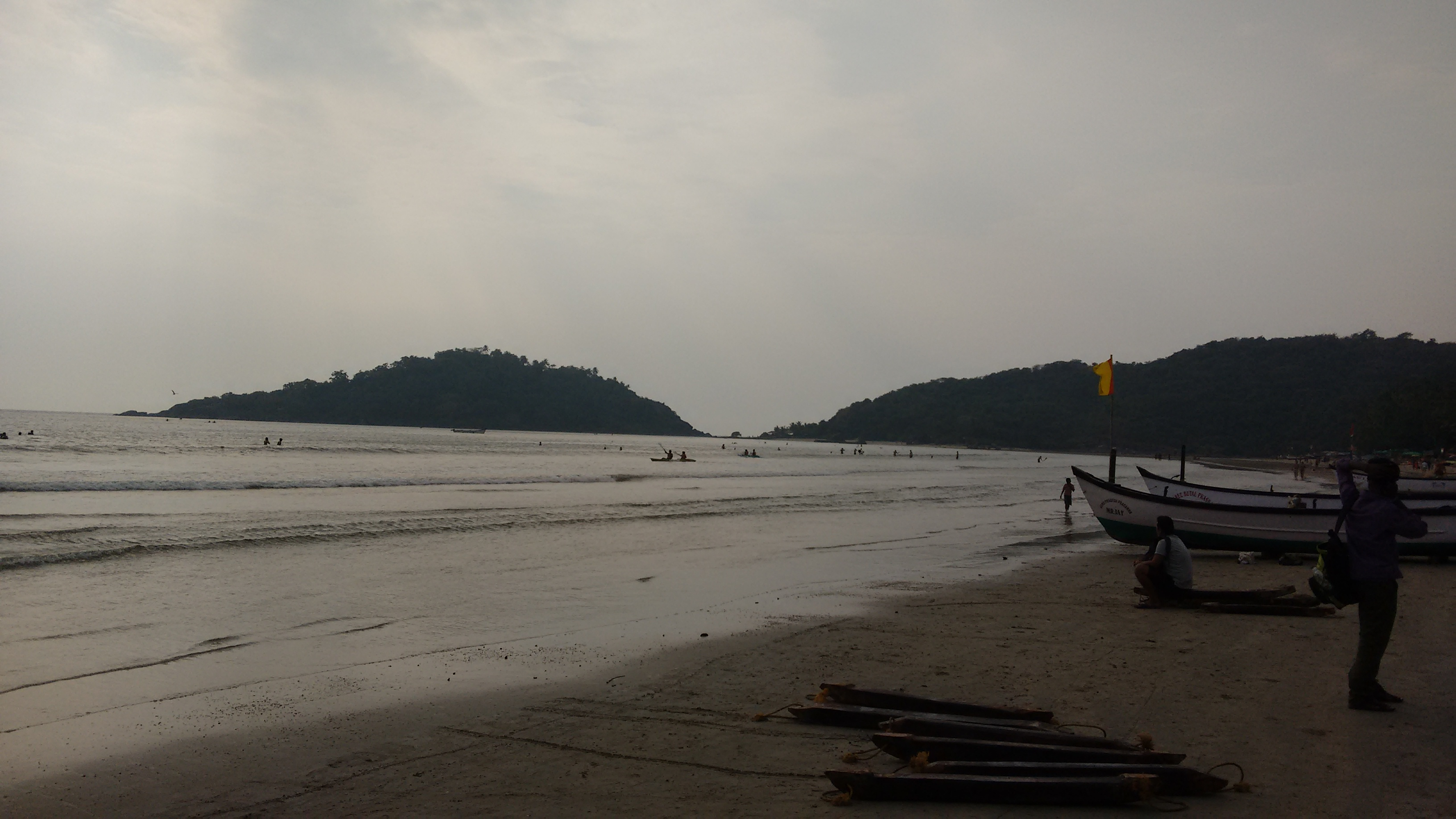
The island adjacent to main land palolem beach

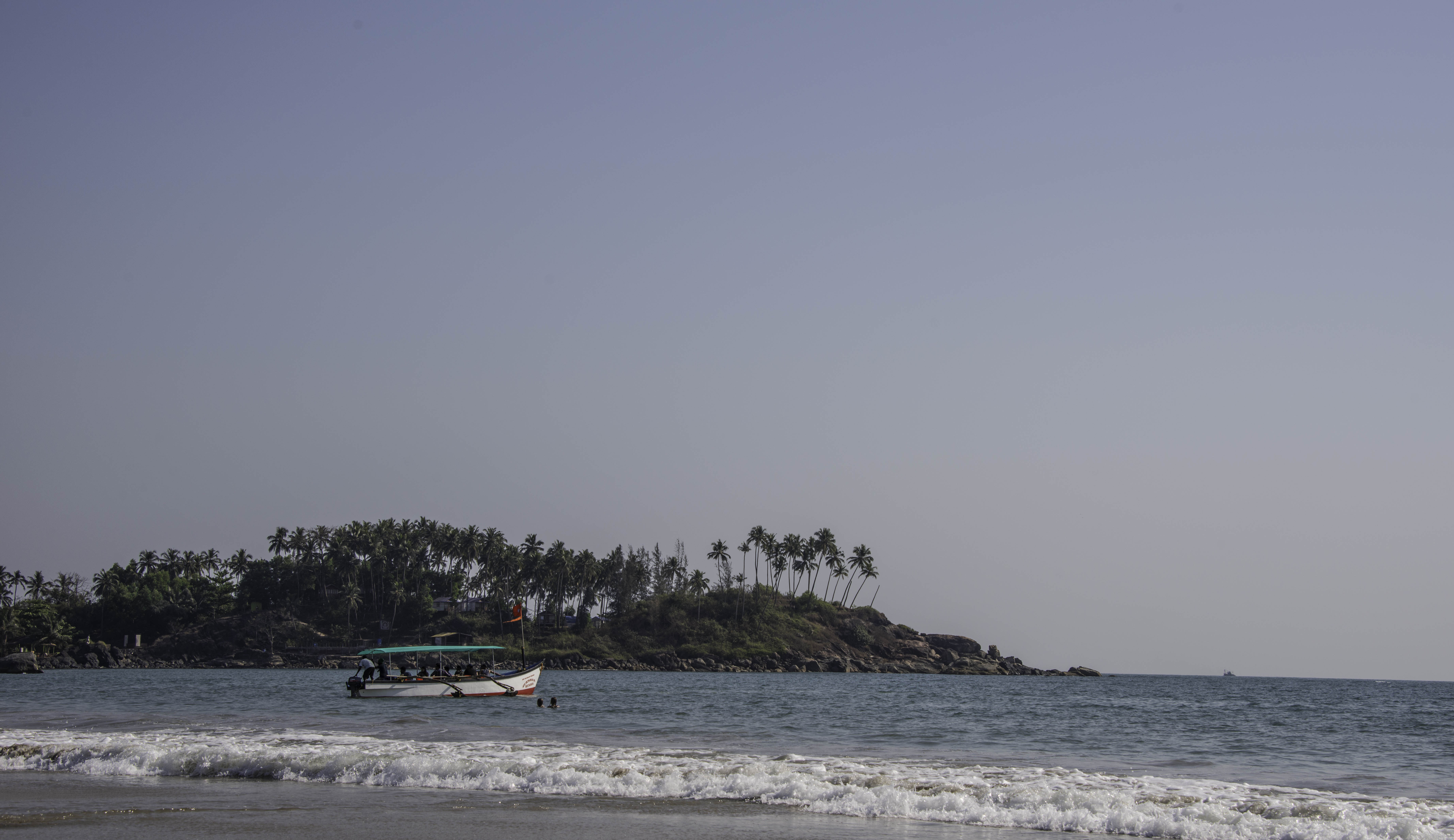
Extreme end of Palolem beach

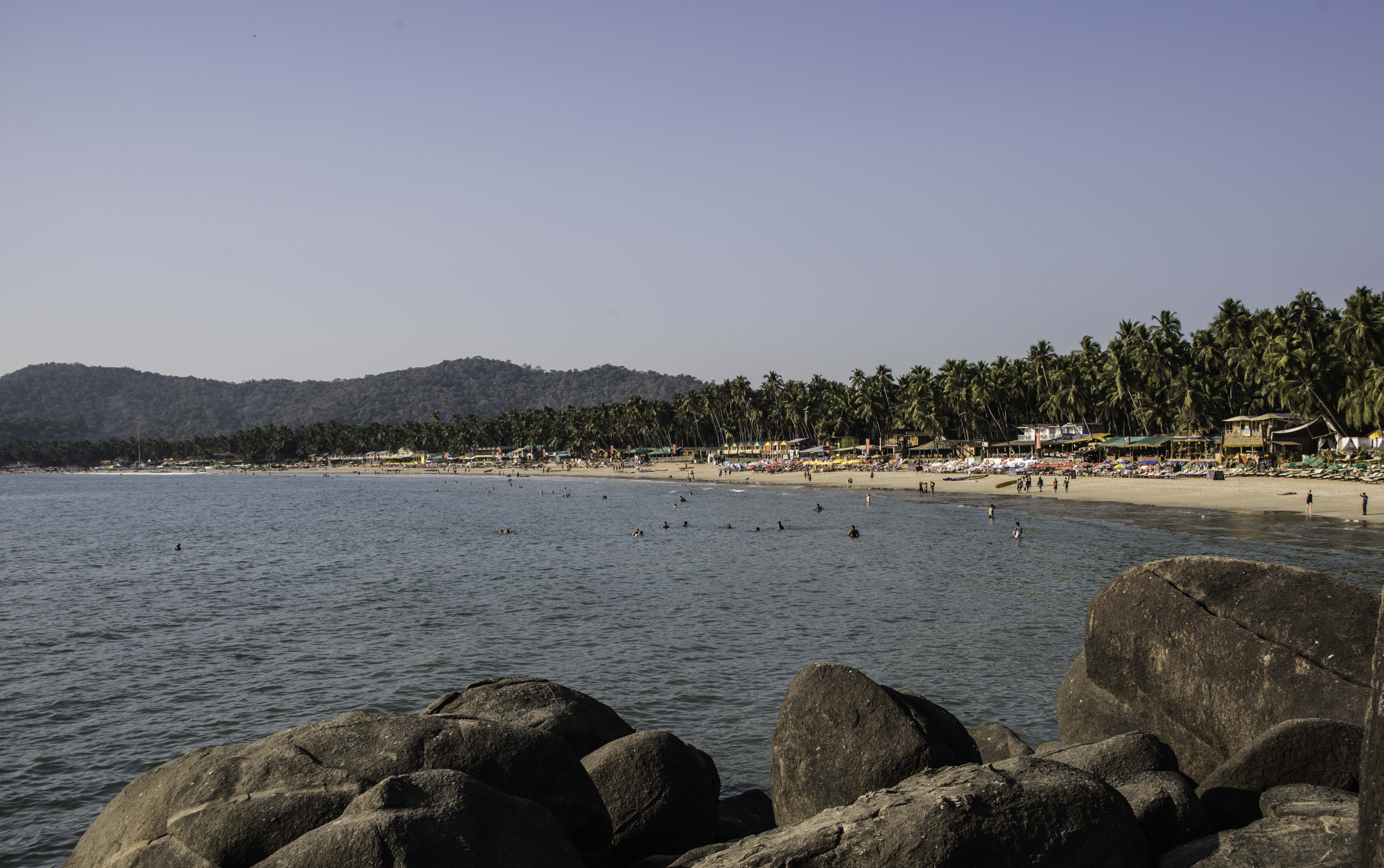
View from left edge of the beach

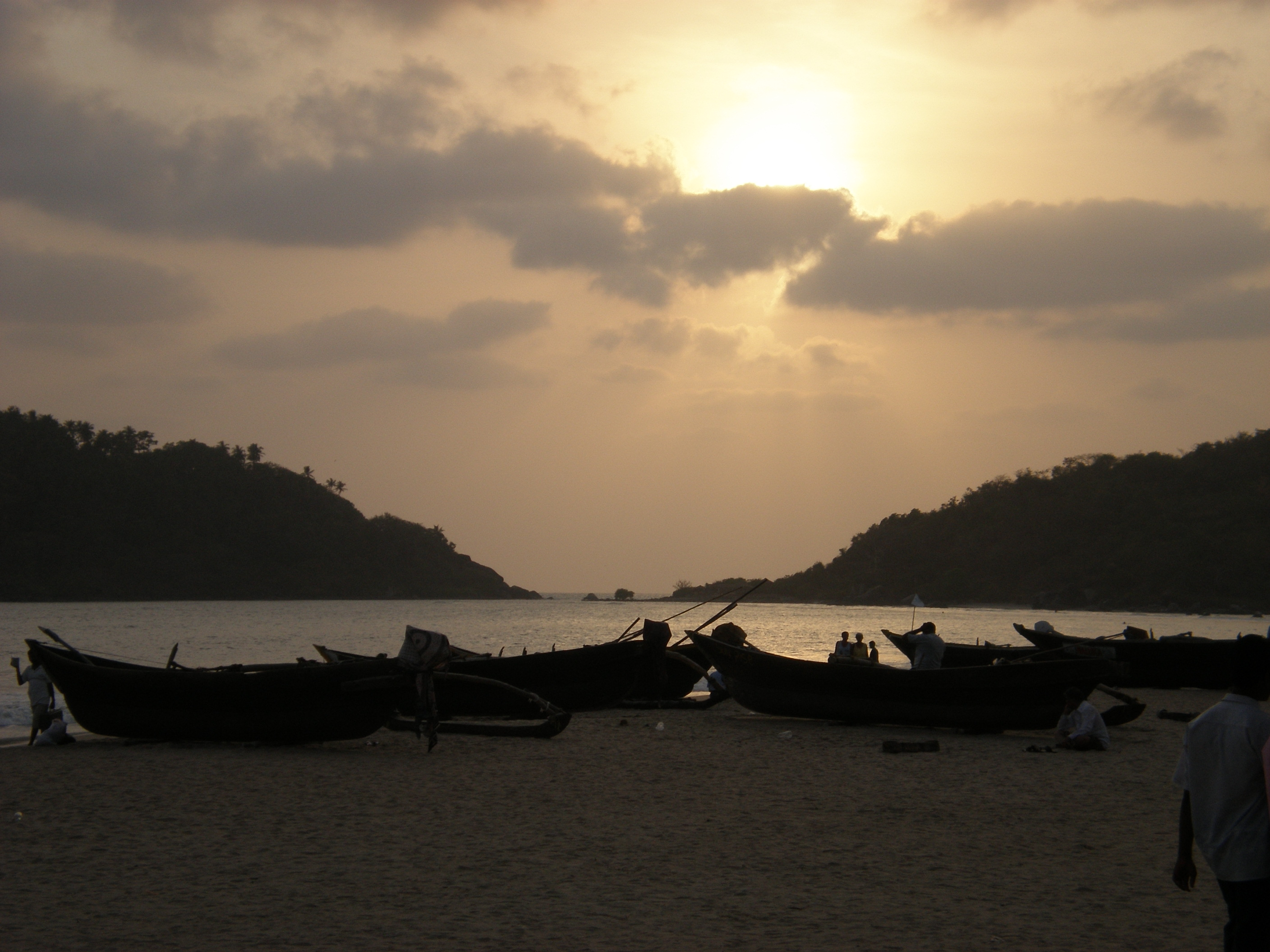
Sunset at Palolem

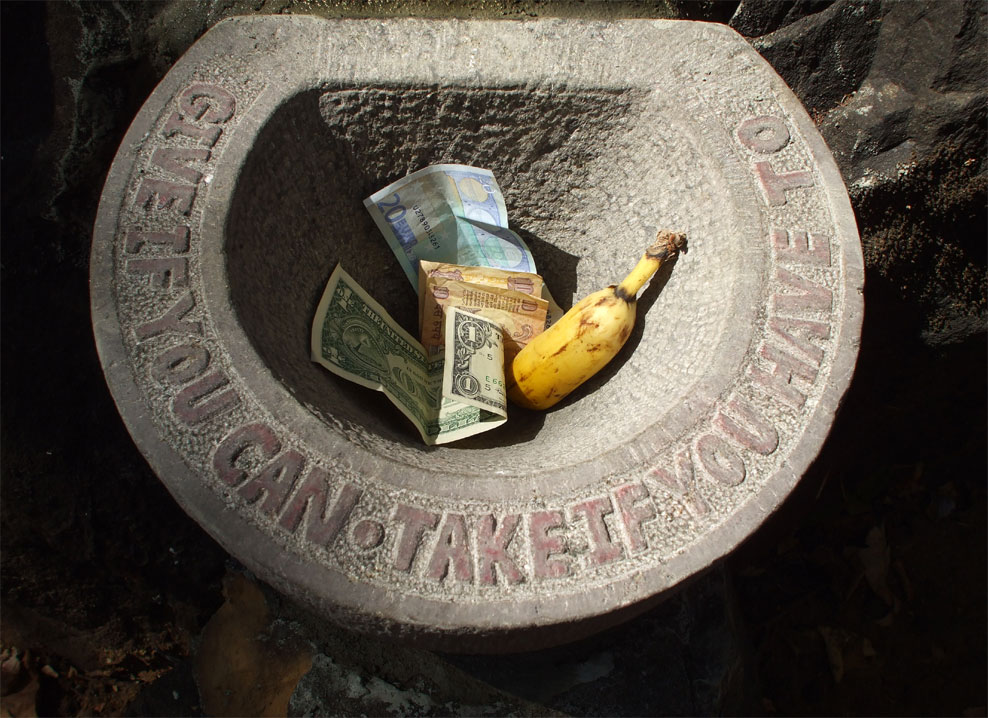
Stone sculpture on top of the Palolem Island by Jacek Tylicki

== See also ==
- List of beaches in Goa
