= Bogdan Perzynski =

Polish artist

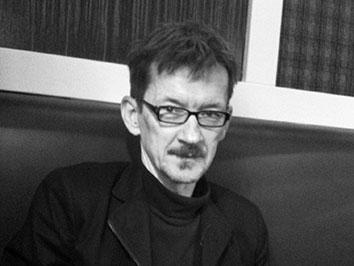
A picture of Bogdan P. K. Perzyński

Bogdan P. K. Perzyński is a contemporary artist who lives and works in Austin, Texas.

== Career ==
Perzyński's first solo show was at the Akumulatory 2, a non-profit art gallery. From 1979 to 1983, he taught at Poznań's Państwowa Wyższa Szkoła Sztuk Plastycznych. While working in Akumulatory 2 gallery, he co-organized exhibitions of numerous international artists who were driven by similar motivations. Before leaving Poland, he participated in re-enactment of several renowned Fluxus performances (e.g. Fluxus Clinic and Fluxus Sports) and produced an interview with Emmett Williams, an artist, poet and Fluxus member. During this time, he also travelled frequently to West Berlin, and in 1983 moved to Hamburg. The following year he relocated to Santa Barbara, California, and began teaching at the University of California Santa Barbara. Since 1987 he has been on the faculty in the Department of Art & Art History at the University of Texas at Austin, where he co-founded the Transmedia area of studies. He maintains an American, and a Polish residence.

== Style ==
Perzyński's early artworks investigated the discourses of public space and utilized photography, performance, interventions, and philosophy of language, culminating in a period during the late 1980s-early 1990s characterized by a series of intricate large-scale installations, shown widely, including at the Mattress Factory in Pittsburgh, PA.

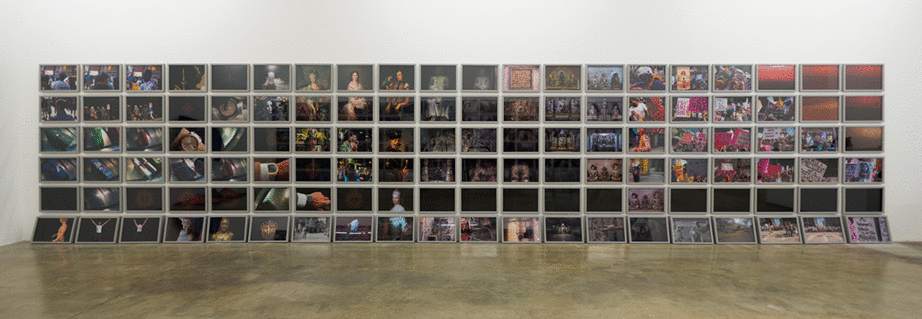
TABLE. Liliana Bloch, Dallas, 2018.

From 2004 to 2010 Perzyński created the major full-length video work Fortune Teller. Commenting on the piece, Dr. Martin Patrick stated: “The video drew inspiration from the artist's own biographical experiences and how they seemed to uncannily intersect with horoscope entries from Vogue magazine. The resultant video collecting twelve short vignettes, incorporates a wide range of cultural reference points from new physics and technologies to Brion Gysin's Dream Machine.”Writer and art curator Angélica de Moraes writes of the artist's work:"Perzyński reflects on the random decisions that mark our life and the precariousness of what we call destiny." Fortune Teller has been internationally presented, including at Ngā Taonga Sound & Vision in Wellington, New Zealand, Dallas Contemporary in Dallas, and Santander Cultural in Porto Alegre, Argentina.
