= Jacek Tylicki =

American artist (born 1951)

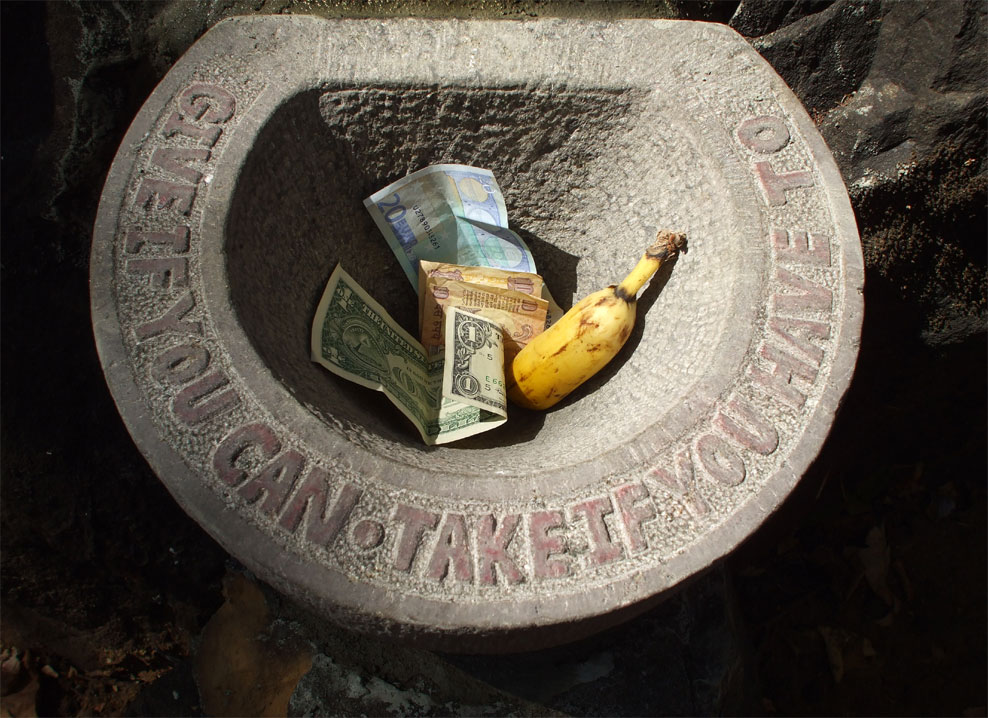
Stone sculpture, Give If You Can - Take If You Have To, Palolem, India, 2008

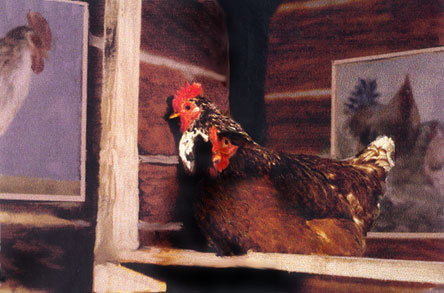
Installation Chicken Art, Now Gallery, New York City, 1987

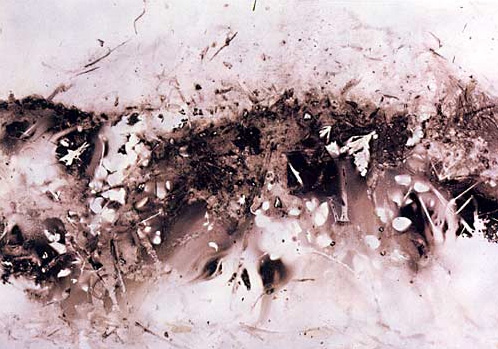
Natural Art, Number 183, (Created by nature), on the ground of the old forest, South Sweden, 17/08 - 29/08 1976, 47,5 x 35.5 cm

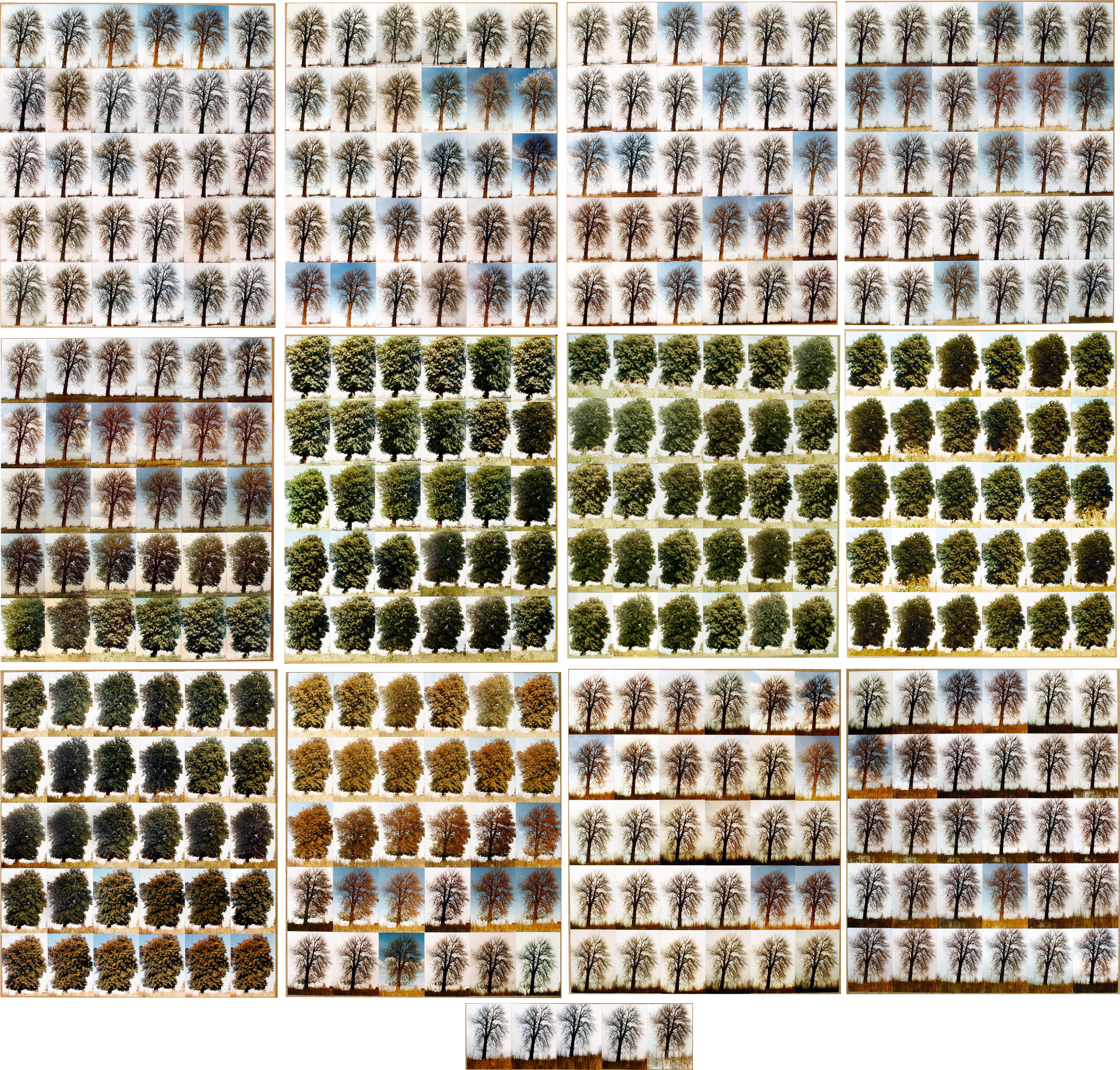
365 days, One photograph a day of a tree, Lund, Sweden, Jan 1 - Dec 31, 1979

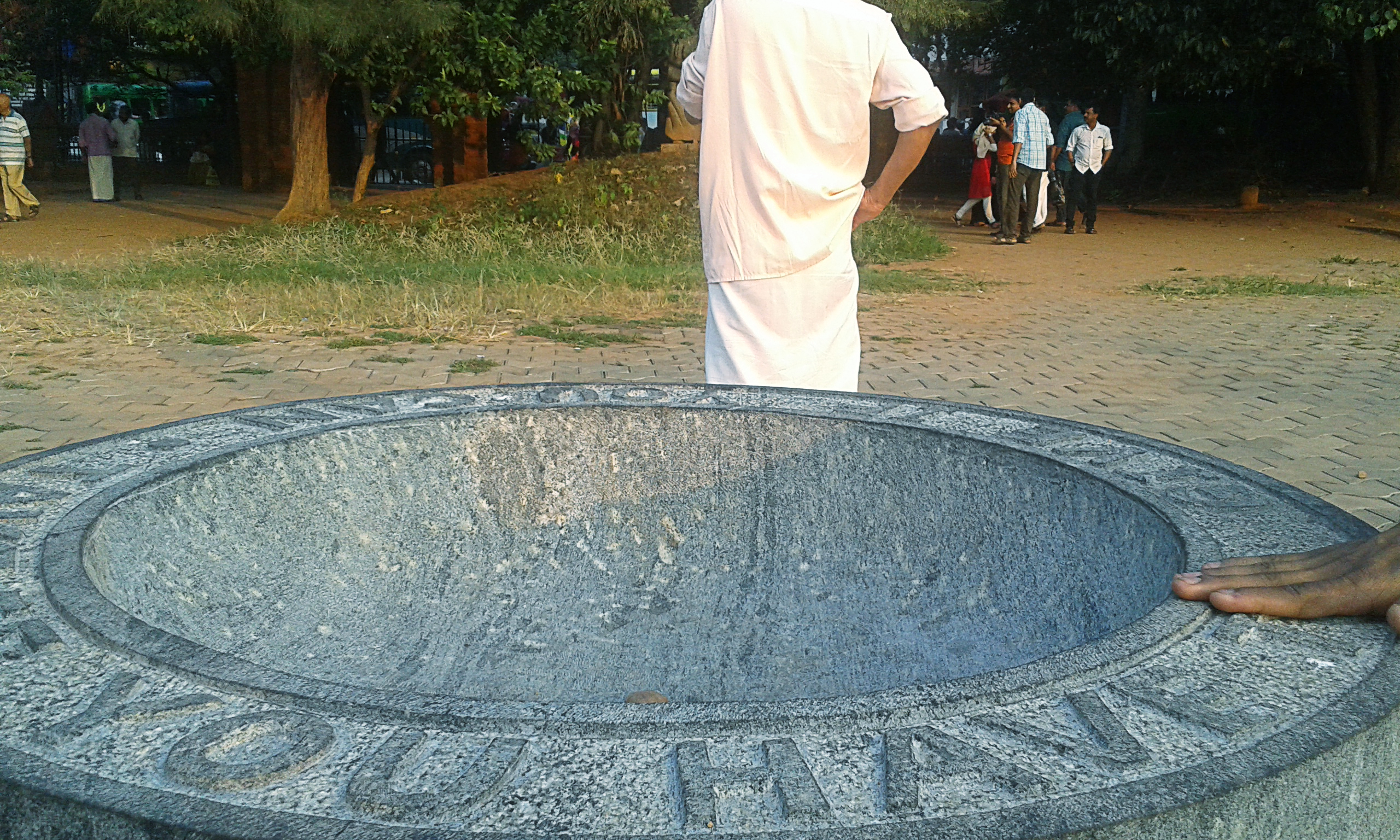
Mananchira, Calicut, India

Jacek Tylicki (born 1951 in Sopot, Poland) is a Polish artist who settled in New York City in 1982. Tylicki works in the field of land art, installation art, and site-specific art. His conceptual projects often raise social and environmental issues.

== Works ==
Starting in 1973, Tylicki began sending sheets of canvas or paper into the wind, rivers, or forests and leaving them for a long while in a natural environment, thus forcing upon nature an attitude previously reserved to the artist: the creation of forms. The project is often called natural art.

In the years 1974–1990, he initiated the idea of an anonymous artist by issuing a periodical called Anonymous Artists where artists could present their art without revealing their own names. In 1985 he created an installation called Chicken Art. Tylicki transformed the Now Gallery in Manhattan to a hen house in which live chickens watched realistic paintings of chickens, chicks and roosters hanging on the gallery walls. Tylicki declared:

For a chicken the most beautiful is chicken.

Another installation was the Free Art, where Tylicki invited well-known artists, including Mark Kostabi and Rodney Alan Greenblat, to give away their art to the public for free. Video and photography play an important role in his work as a record of its elusiveness and transience.

In 2019, Tylicki and his daughter, Michelle, created "Art Wars" a street art performance in London. It was a recreation of Tylicki's performance in the East Village in the 1980s.

== Exhibitions ==
Tylicki has exhibited his work internationally; a selection of group shows include: Land Art Mongolia Bienalle, Gobi Desert, Mongolia (2016); Mananchira, Calicut, India (2015); Museum of Contemporary Art in Kraków (MOCAK), Poland (2013); Dublin Biennial, Ireland (2012); Zacheta National Gallery of Art, Warsaw, Poland (2012);

Solo exhibitions include: those at Galerie Kanal 2, Copenhagen, Denmark (1980); Galeria BWA, Sopot, Poland (1980); Galerie Sudurgata 7, Reykjavik, Iceland () (1980); Gallery 38, Copenhagen, Denmark (1979); Galeria Sien Gdanska, Gdansk, Poland (1979); Galerie St. Petri, Lund, Sweden (1979); Galeria Akumulatory 2, Poznan, Poland (1979);Galerie Sudurgata 7, Reykjavik, Iceland (1979); Gallerie Porten, Lund, Sweden (1976); BTJ Gallery, Lund, Sweden (1976)

== Collections ==
Bunkier Sztuki Collection at Gallery of Contemporary Art, Krakow

== Sources ==
- Leszek Brogowski, "Jacek Tylicki and a new ethos of art", Project magazine, Poland, 202-203/1995 p. 41-53
- Les Krantz, The New York Art Review, 1988, (ISBN 0-913765-09-0), p. 1218-1229
- Now Gallery, Artforum March 1985.
- Laura Cottingham, "Free Art", Art & Auction Magazine, June 1987, p. 24
- EAST VILLAGE 85: A guide. A Documentary, Pelham, 1985.
- "New Art Now" Nowy Dziennik, New York, 12-09-1985
- New York Magazine, November 18, 1985, p. 121
- Who's Who in Polish America, Bicentennial Pub. Corp., 1996, p. 473
- Artbibliographies Modern, Cambridge Scientific Abstracts, v. 28, no. 1 - 1997, str. 708 1 - 1997, p. 708
- Jack Tylicki (2012), Jacek Tylicki. Nature 1973 - 2012., USA: 21Universe, ISBN 9780985369200, OL 25410283M
- Beyond Corrupted Eye: Akumulatory 2 Gallery 1972–1990, Zachęta National Gallery of Art, Warsaw, Poland, 2012, pp. 576–577, ISBN 9788360713679, archived from the original on 2013-07-05
- Nature's Apprentice, Frame magazine, Nov–Dec 2014, pp. 72–74
