= 7th Goa Assembly =

Unicameral legislature of the state of Goa in India

- Goa Legislative Assembly
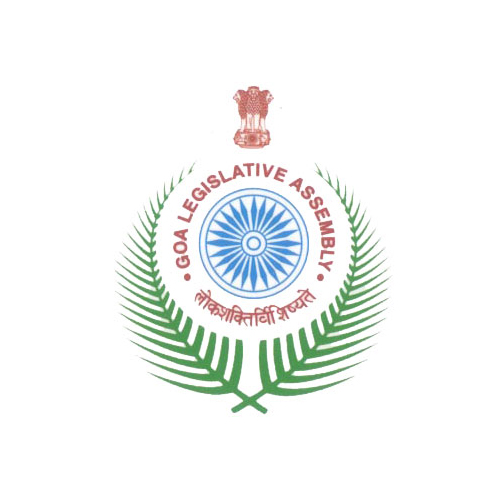

Type
- Type: Unicameral
- Term limits: 5 years

History
- Founded: 2017
- Disbanded: 2022
- Preceded by: 6th Goa Assembly
- Succeeded by: 8th Goa Assembly

Leadership
- Speaker: Rajesh Patnekar, BJP since 3 June 2019
- Deputy Speaker: Vacant since 20 January 2021
- Leader of the House (Chief Minister): Pramod Sawant, BJP since 19 March 2019
- Leader of the Opposition: Digambar Kamat, INC since 18 July 2019

Structure
- Seats: 40
- Political groups: Government (19); NDA (19): BJP (19); Opposition (3); UPA (3): INC (2); GFP (1); Others (2); AITC+ (2): MGP (1); AITC (1); Vacant (16): Vacant (16)

Elections
- Voting system: First past the post
- Last election: 4 February 2017
- Next election: 14 February 2022

Meeting place
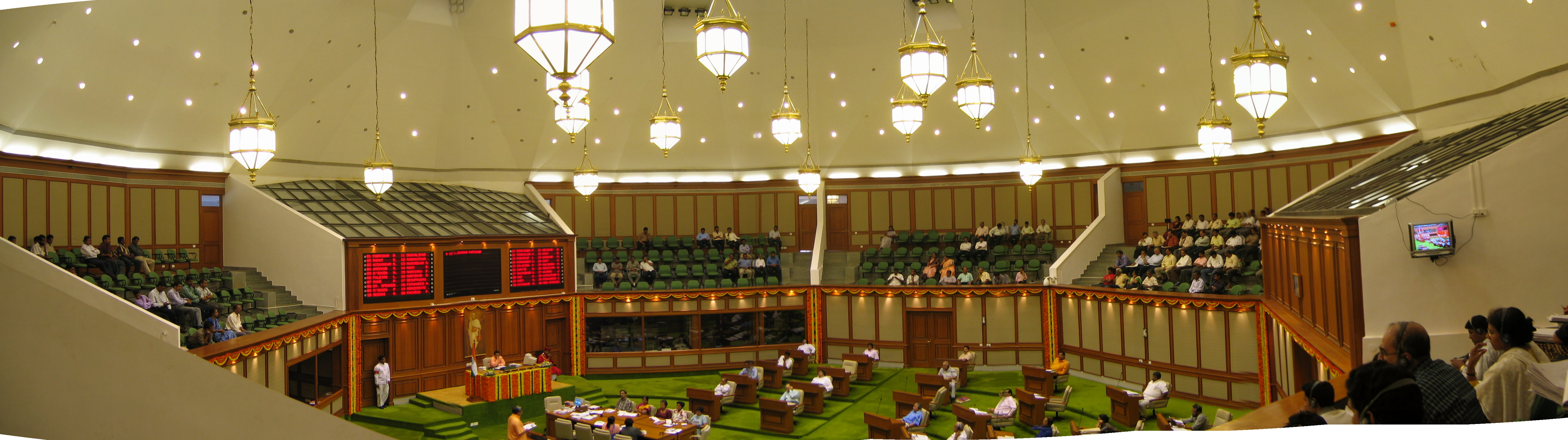
- Goa State Legislative Assembly Complex, Porvorim, Bardez, Goa, India

Website
- Goa Legislative Assembly

The Seventh Goa Assembly (term: 2017–2022) was the unicameral legislature of the state of Goa in western India. It consists of 40 members. In charge of the budget, the Assembly appropriated money for social programs, agricultural development, infrastructure development, etc. It was also responsible for proposing and levying taxes.

The Assembly met in the Goa State Legislative Assembly Complex in Porvorim, Bardez.

== History ==
=== Elections ===
The 2017 Goa Legislative Assembly election was held on 4 February 2017 to elect the 40 members of the Seventh Goa Legislative Assembly, as the term of Sixth Legislative Assembly ended on 18 March 2017. VVPAT-fitted EVMs was used in entire Goa state in the 2017 elections, which was the first time that an entire state in India saw the implementation of VVPAT.

=== Defections ===
In July 2019 fourteen members of Indian National Congress switched their parties and joined Bharatiya Janata Party.

List of MLAs
No.	Assembly Constituency		MLA	Notes
No.	#	Name	MLA	Notes
1	22	Siroda	Subhash Shirodkar	In 2017 changed party from Congress to BJP
2	1	Mandrem	Dayanand Sopte	In 2019 changed party from Congress to BJP
3	4	Tivim	Nilkanth Halarnkar	In 2019 changed party from Congress to BJP
4	7	Saligao	Jayesh Salgaonkar	In 2019 changed party from GFP to BJP
5	9	Porvorim	Rohan Khaunte	In 2019 changed party from Independent to BJP
6	11	Panaji	Atanasio Monserrate	In 2019 changed party from Congress to BJP
7	12	Taleigao	Jennifer Monserrate	In 2019 changed party from Congress to BJP
8	13	St. Cruz	Antonio Fernandes	in 2019 changed party from Congress to BJP
9	14	St. Andre	Francisco Silveira	in 2019 changed party from Congress to BJP
10	19	Valpoi	Vishwajit Pratapsingh Rane	In 2019 changed party from Congress to BJP
11	28	Nuvem	Wilfred D'sa	in 2019 changed party from Congress to BJP
12	34	Cuncolim	Clafasio Dias	in 2019 changed party from Congress to BJP
13	35	Velim	Filipe Nery Rodrigues	in 2019 changed party from Congress to BJP
14	36	Quepem	Chandrakant Kavlekar	in 2019 changed party from Congress to BJP
15	40	Canacona	Isidore Fernandes	in 2019 changed party from Congress to BJP
16	21	Ponda	Ravi Naik	In 2021 changed party from Congress to BJP

== List of speakers ==
Name	Party	Tenure	
Name	Party	Term start	Term end
Pramod Sawant	BJP	22-03-2017	19-03-2019
Rajesh Patnekar	BJP	19-03-2019	Incumbent

== Composition of the assembly ==
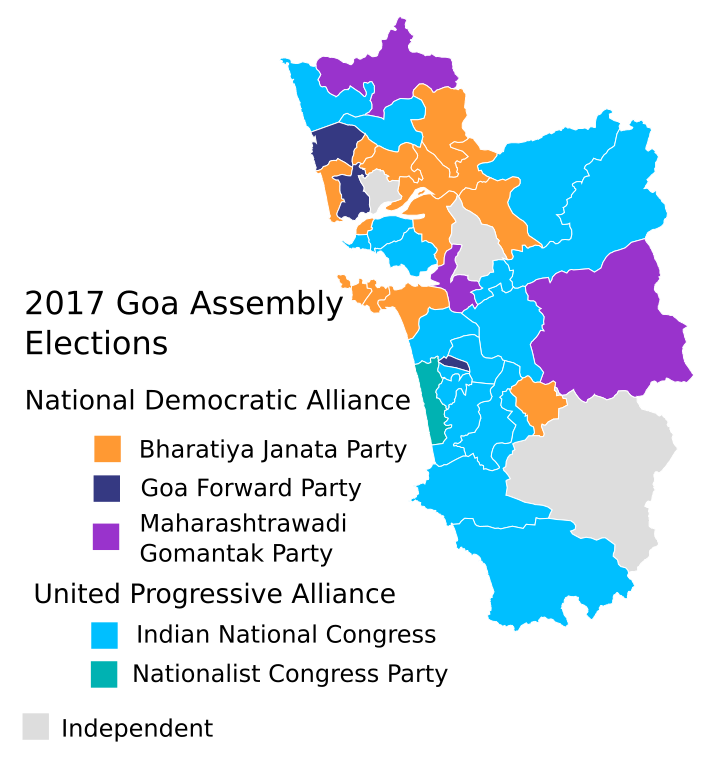

← Partywise composition of 7th Goa Legislative Assembly after 2017 election
Parties and coalitions	Seats
Bharatiya Janata Party (BJP)	13
Indian National Congress (INC)	17
Maharashtrawadi Gomantak Party (MAG)	3
Independents (IND)	3
Goa Forward Party (GFP)	3
Nationalist Congress Party (NCP)	1
Total	40

Goa Legislative Assembly Aug 2017

Goa Legislative Assembly 2019

Goa Legislative Assembly July 2020

== Members of Legislative Assembly ==
The list of MLAs after the 2017 election until the end of 2021 is shown below. In July 2019 ten members of Indian National Congress switched their parties and joined Bharatiya Janata Party.

List of MLAs
Assembly Constituency		MLA		
#	Name	Member	Party	Notes
1	Mandrem	Dayanand Sopte	Indian National Congress	In 2019 changed party from Congress to BJP
1	Mandrem	Dayanand Sopte	Bharatiya Janata Party	In 2019 changed party from Congress to BJP
2	Pernem	Manohar Ajgaonkar	Maharashtrawadi Gomantak Party	
3	Bicholim	Rajesh Patnekar	Bharatiya Janata Party	
4	Tivim	Nilkanth Halarnkar	Indian National Congress	In 2019 changed party from Congress to BJP
4	Tivim	Nilkanth Halarnkar	Bharatiya Janata Party	In 2019 changed party from Congress to BJP
5	Mapusa	Francis D'Souza	Bharatiya Janata Party	
6	Siolim	Vinoda Paliencar	Goa Forward Party	
7	Saligao	Jayesh Salgaonkar	Goa Forward Party	In 2019 changed party from GFP to BJP
7	Saligao	Jayesh Salgaonkar	Bharatiya Janata Party	In 2019 changed party from GFP to BJP
8	Calangute	Michael Lobo	Bharatiya Janata Party	
9	Porvorim	Rohan Khaunte	Independent politician	In 2019 changed party from IND to BJP
9	Porvorim	Rohan Khaunte	Bharatiya Janata Party	In 2019 changed party from IND to BJP
10	Aldona	Glenn Ticlo	Bharatiya Janata Party	
11	Panaji	Sidharth Kuncalienker	Bharatiya Janata Party	Resigned in May 2017 for Parrikar to contest
11	Panaji	Manohar Parrikar	Bharatiya Janata Party	Died in 2019
11	Panaji	Atanasio Monserrate	Indian National Congress	In 2019 changed party from Congress to BJP
11	Panaji	Atanasio Monserrate	Bharatiya Janata Party	In 2019 changed party from Congress to BJP
12	Taleigao	Jennifer Monserrate	Indian National Congress	In 2019 changed party from Congress to BJP
12	Taleigao	Jennifer Monserrate	Bharatiya Janata Party	In 2019 changed party from Congress to BJP
13	St. Cruz	Antonio Fernandes	Indian National Congress	in 2019 changed party from Congress to BJP
13	St. Cruz	Antonio Fernandes	Bharatiya Janata Party	in 2019 changed party from Congress to BJP
14	St. Andre	Francisco Silveira	Indian National Congress	in 2019 changed party from Congress to BJP
14	St. Andre	Francisco Silveira	Bharatiya Janata Party	in 2019 changed party from Congress to BJP
15	Cumbarjua	Pandurang Madkaikar	Bharatiya Janata Party	
16	Maem	Pravin Zantye	Bharatiya Janata Party	
17	Sanquelim	Pramod Sawant	Bharatiya Janata Party	
18	Poriem	Pratapsingh Rane	Indian National Congress	
19	Valpoi	Vishwajit Pratapsingh Rane	Indian National Congress	In 2019 changed party from Congress to BJP
19	Valpoi	Vishwajit Pratapsingh Rane	Bharatiya Janata Party	In 2019 changed party from Congress to BJP
20	Priol	Govind Gaude	Independent	
21	Ponda	Ravi Naik	Indian National Congress	In 2021 changed party from Congress to BJP
21	Ponda	Ravi Naik	Bharatiya Janata Party	In 2021 changed party from Congress to BJP
22	Siroda	Subhash Shirodkar	Indian National Congress	In 2017 changed party from Congress to BJP
22	Siroda	Subhash Shirodkar	Bharatiya Janata Party	In 2017 changed party from Congress to BJP
23	Marcaim	Sudin Dhavalikar	Maharashtrawadi Gomantak Party	
24	Mormugao	Milind Naik	Bharatiya Janata Party	
25	Vasco da Gama	Carlos Almeida	Bharatiya Janata Party	
26	Dabolim	Mauvin Godinho	Bharatiya Janata Party	
27	Cortalim	Alina Saldanha	Bharatiya Janata Party	
28	Nuvem	Wilfred D'sa	Indian National Congress	in 2019 changed party from Congress to BJP
28	Nuvem	Wilfred D'sa	Bharatiya Janata Party	in 2019 changed party from Congress to BJP
29	Curtorim	Aleixo Lourenco	Indian National Congress	
30	Fatorda	Vijai Sardesai	Goa Forward Party	
31	Margao	Digambar Kamat	Indian National Congress	
32	Benaulim	Churchill Alemao	Nationalist Congress Party	
33	Navelim	Luizinho Faleiro	Indian National Congress	
34	Cuncolim	Clafasio Dias	Indian National Congress	in 2019 changed party from Congress to BJP
34	Cuncolim	Clafasio Dias	Bharatiya Janata Party	in 2019 changed party from Congress to BJP
35	Velim	Filipe Nery Rodrigues	Indian National Congress	in 2019 changed party from Congress to BJP
35	Velim	Filipe Nery Rodrigues	Bharatiya Janata Party	in 2019 changed party from Congress to BJP
36	Quepem	Chandrakant Kavlekar	Indian National Congress	in 2019 changed party from Congress to BJP
36	Quepem	Chandrakant Kavlekar	Bharatiya Janata Party	in 2019 changed party from Congress to BJP
37	Curchorem	Nilesh Cabral	Bharatiya Janata Party	
38	Sanvordem	Deepak Pauskar	Maharashtrawadi Gomantak Party	
39	Sanguem	Prasad Gaonkar	Independent	
40	Canacona	Isidore Fernandes	Indian National Congress	in 2019 changed party from Congress to BJP
40	Canacona	Isidore Fernandes	Bharatiya Janata Party	in 2019 changed party from Congress to BJP

=== End of Seventh Assembly ===
In December 2021- January 2022, as the term of the seventh assembly came near to the end, several MLAs resigned and switched parties before the next elections. They were

- Siolim : Resignation by Vinoda Paliencar
- Saligao : Resignation by Jayesh Salgaonkar
- Calangute : Resignation by Michael Lobo
- Porvorim : Resignation by Rohan Khaunte
- Maem: Resignation by Pravin Zantye
- Priol : Resignation by Govind Gaude
- Ponda : Resignation by Ravi Naik
- Vasco da Gama : Resignation by Carlos Almeida
- Cortalim : Resignation by Alina Saldanha
- Nuvem : Resignation by Wilfred D'sa
- Curtorim : Resignation by Aleixo Lourenco
- Benaulim's MLA Churchill Alemao switched from NCP to All India Trinamool Congress (AITC)
- Navelim : Resignation by Luizinho Faleiro
- Velim : Resignation by Filipe Nery Rodrigues
- Sanvordem : Resignation by Deepak Pauskar
- Sanguem : Resignation by Prasad Gaonkar
- Canacona : Resignation by Isidore Fernandes
