= 8th Goa Assembly =

Unicameral legislature of the state of Goa in India

Eighth Goa Assembly
- Goa Legislative Assembly
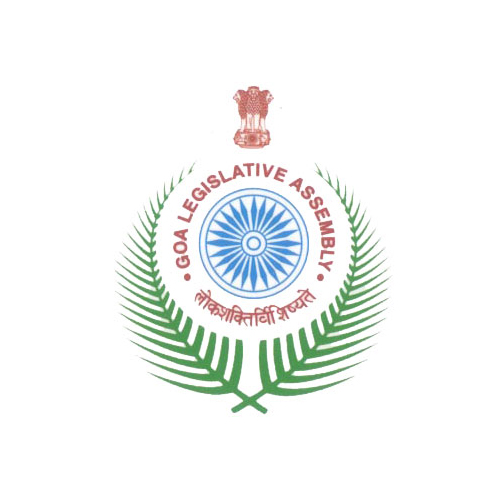

Type
- Type: Unicameral
- Term limits: 5 years

History
- Founded: 2022
- Preceded by: 7th Goa Assembly

Leadership
- Speaker: Ganesh Gaonkar, BJP since 25 September 2025
- Deputy Speaker: Joshua D'Souza, BJP since 22 July 2022
- Leader of the House (Chief Minister): Pramod Sawant, BJP since 19 March 2019
- Leader of the Opposition: Yuri Alemao, INC since 30 September 2022

Structure
- Seats: 40
- Political groups: Government (33) NDA (33): BJP (28); MGP (2); IND (3); Opposition (7) INDIA (4): INC (3); GFP (1); AAP (2) RGP (1)

Elections
- Voting system: First past the post
- Last election: 14 February 2022
- Next election: 2027

Meeting place
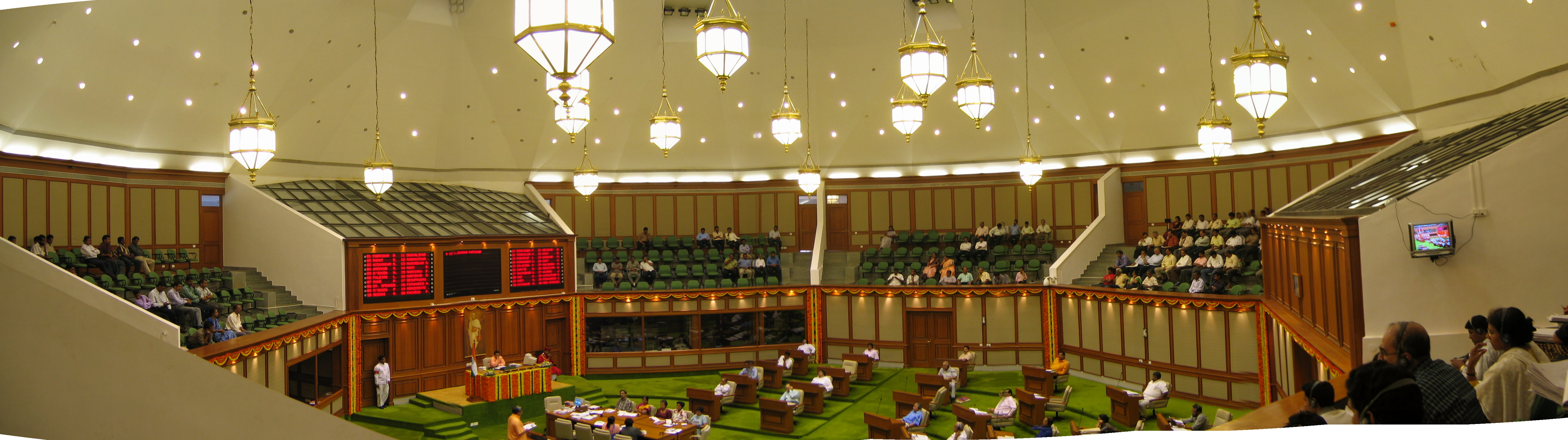
- Goa State Legislative Assembly Complex, Porvorim, Bardez, Goa, India

Website
- Goa Legislative Assembly

The Eighth Goa Assembly (term : 2022-present) is the unicameral legislature of the state of Goa in western India. It consists of 40 members. It is in-charge of the budget, the Assembly appropriates money for social programs, agricultural development, infrastructure development, etc. It is also responsible for proposing and levying taxes.

The Assembly meets in the Goa State Legislative Assembly Complex in Porvorim, Bardez.

== History ==
=== Elections ===
Legislative Assembly elections were held in Goa on 14 February 2022 to elect 40 members of the Eighth Goa Legislative Assembly. The votes were counted and the results were declared on 10 March 2022.

In July 2022, the ruling BJP's MLA Joshua D'Souza was elected for the post of the Deputy Speaker of the Goa Legislative Assembly, with 25 votes.

=== Defections ===
On 14 September 2022, 8 Congress MLAs switched party and joined BJP after a successful Operation Kamala. Former Minister Michael Lobo, along with 7 other Congress MLAs joined Bharatiya Janata Party, after meeting Dr. Pramod Sawant, Chief Minister of Goa from BJP.

No.	Constituency	Name	Remarks
6	Siolim	Delilah Lobo	Defected from Congress to BJP on 14 September 2022
7	Saligao	Kedar Naik	Defected from Congress to BJP on 14 September 2022
8	Calangute	Michael Lobo	Defected from Congress to BJP on 14 September 2022
13	St. Cruz	Rodolfo Louis Fernandes	Defected from Congress to BJP on 14 September 2022
15	Cumbarjua	Rajesh Faldessai	Defected from Congress to BJP on 14 September 2022
24	Mormugao	Sankalp Amonkar	Defected from Congress to BJP on 14 September 2022
28	Nuvem	Aleixo Sequeira	Defected from Congress to BJP on 14 September 2022
31	Margao	Digambar Kamat	Defected from Congress to BJP on 14 September 2022

== Composition ==
=== March 2022 - September 2022 ===
Goa Legislative Assembly March-September 2022

Composition of the Eighth Goa Legislative Assembly by alliance and party, after the election results in 2022

Alliance	Party	Seats			Bench
Alliance	Party	Party	Alliance	Bench	Bench
NDA	Bharatiya Janata Party	20	25		Government
NDA	Maharashtrawadi Gomantak Party	2	25		Government
NDA	Independents	3	25		Government
UPA	Indian National Congress	11	12	15	Others
UPA	Goa Forward Party	1	12	15	Others
AAP	Aam Aadmi Party	2		15	Others
RGP	Revolutionary Goans Party	1		15	Others
Total		40			

=== September 2022 - to present ===
Goa Legislative Assembly Sept 2022 onwards

Composition after 14 September 2022 when 8 Congress MLA switched party and joined BJP.

Alliance	Party	Seats			Bench
Alliance	Party	Party	Alliance	Bench	Bench
NDA	Bharatiya Janata Party	28	33		Government
NDA	Maharashtrawadi Gomantak Party	2	33		Government
NDA	Independents	3	33		Government
I.N.D.I.A	Indian National Congress	3	4	7	Others
I.N.D.I.A	Goa Forward Party	1	4	7	Others
AAP	Aam Aadmi Party	2		7	Others
RGP	Revolutionary Goans Party	1		7	Others
Total		40			

== Members of Legislative Assembly ==
Current Numbers Wise Map of 8th Goa Legislative Assembly

District	No.	Constituency	Name	Party	Alliance	Remarks
North Goa	1	Mandrem	Jit Arolkar	Maharashtrawadi Gomantak Party	NDA	
North Goa	2	Pernem (SC)	Pravin Arlekar	Bharatiya Janata Party	NDA	
North Goa	3	Bicholim	Chandrakant Shetye	Independent	NDA	
North Goa	4	Tivim	Nilkanth Halarnkar	Bharatiya Janata Party	NDA	Cabinet Minister
North Goa	5	Mapusa	Joshua D'Souza	Bharatiya Janata Party	NDA	
North Goa	6	Siolim	Delilah Lobo	Indian National Congress	UPA	Switched from INC to BJP on 14 September 2022
North Goa	6	Siolim	Delilah Lobo	Bharatiya Janata Party	NDA	Switched from INC to BJP on 14 September 2022
North Goa	7	Saligao	Kedar Naik	Indian National Congress	UPA	Switched from INC to BJP on 14 September 2022
North Goa	7	Saligao	Kedar Naik	Bharatiya Janata Party	NDA	Switched from INC to BJP on 14 September 2022
North Goa	8	Calangute	Michael Lobo	Indian National Congress	UPA	Switched from INC to BJP on 14 September 2022
North Goa	8	Calangute	Michael Lobo	Bharatiya Janata Party	NDA	Switched from INC to BJP on 14 September 2022
North Goa	9	Porvorim	Rohan Khaunte	Bharatiya Janata Party	NDA	Cabinet Minister
North Goa	10	Aldona	Carlos Alvares Ferreira	Indian National Congress	UPA	
North Goa	11	Panaji	Atanasio Monserrate	Bharatiya Janata Party	NDA	Cabinet Minister
North Goa	12	Taleigao	Jennifer Monserrate	Bharatiya Janata Party	NDA	
North Goa	13	Santa Cruz	Rodolfo Louis Fernandes	Indian National Congress	UPA	Switched from INC to BJP on 14 September 2022
North Goa	13	Santa Cruz	Rodolfo Louis Fernandes	Bharatiya Janata Party	NDA	Switched from INC to BJP on 14 September 2022
North Goa	14	St. Andre	Viresh Borkar	Revolutionary Goans Party		
North Goa	15	Cumbarjua	Rajesh Faldessai	Indian National Congress	UPA	Switched from INC to BJP on 14 September 2022
North Goa	15	Cumbarjua	Rajesh Faldessai	Bharatiya Janata Party	NDA	Switched from INC to BJP on 14 September 2022
North Goa	16	Maem	Premendra Shet	Bharatiya Janata Party	NDA	
North Goa	17	Sanquelim	Pramod Sawant	Bharatiya Janata Party	NDA	Chief Minister
North Goa	18	Poriem	Deviya Rane	Bharatiya Janata Party	NDA	
North Goa	19	Valpoi	Vishwajit Pratapsingh Rane	Bharatiya Janata Party	NDA	Cabinet Minister
North Goa	20	Priol	Govind Gaude	Bharatiya Janata Party	NDA	
North Goa	21	Ponda	Ravi Naik	Bharatiya Janata Party	NDA	Cabinet Minister
North Goa	22	Siroda	Subhash Shirodkar	Bharatiya Janata Party	NDA	Cabinet Minister
North Goa	23	Marcaim	Sudin Dhavalikar	Maharashtrawadi Gomantak Party	NDA	Cabinet Minister
South Goa	24	Mormugao	Sankalp Amonkar	Indian National Congress	UPA	Switched from INC to BJP on 14 September 2022
South Goa	24	Mormugao	Sankalp Amonkar	Bharatiya Janata Party	NDA	Switched from INC to BJP on 14 September 2022
South Goa	25	Vasco Da Gama	Krishna Salkar	Bharatiya Janata Party	NDA	
South Goa	26	Dabolim	Mauvin Godinho	Bharatiya Janata Party	NDA	Cabinet Minister
South Goa	27	Cortalim	Antonio Vas	Independent	NDA	
South Goa	28	Nuvem	Aleixo Sequeira	Indian National Congress	UPA	Switched from INC to BJP on 14 September 2022
South Goa	28	Nuvem	Aleixo Sequeira	Bharatiya Janata Party	NDA	Switched from INC to BJP on 14 September 2022
South Goa	29	Curtorim	Aleixo Lourenco	Independent	NDA	
South Goa	30	Fatorda	Vijai Sardesai	Goa Forward Party	UPA	
South Goa	31	Margao	Digambar Kamat	Indian National Congress	UPA	Switched from INC to BJP on 14 September 2022Cabinet Minister
South Goa	31	Margao	Digambar Kamat	Bharatiya Janata Party	NDA	Switched from INC to BJP on 14 September 2022Cabinet Minister
South Goa	32	Benaulim	Venzy Viegas	Aam Aadmi Party		
South Goa	33	Navelim	Ulhas Tuenkar	Bharatiya Janata Party	NDA	
South Goa	34	Cuncolim	Yuri Alemao	Indian National Congress	UPA	
South Goa	35	Velim	Cruz Silva	Aam Aadmi Party		
Kushavati	36	Quepem	Altone D'Costa	Indian National Congress	UPA	
Kushavati	37	Curchorem	Nilesh Cabral	Bharatiya Janata Party	NDA	
Kushavati	38	Sanvordem	Ganesh Gaonkar	Bharatiya Janata Party	NDA	
Kushavati	39	Sanguem	Subhash Phal Desai	Bharatiya Janata Party	NDA	Cabinet Minister
Kushavati	40	Canacona	Ramesh Tawadkar	Bharatiya Janata Party	NDA	Cabinet Minister
