= First Pramod Sawant ministry =

- Ministry of Goa
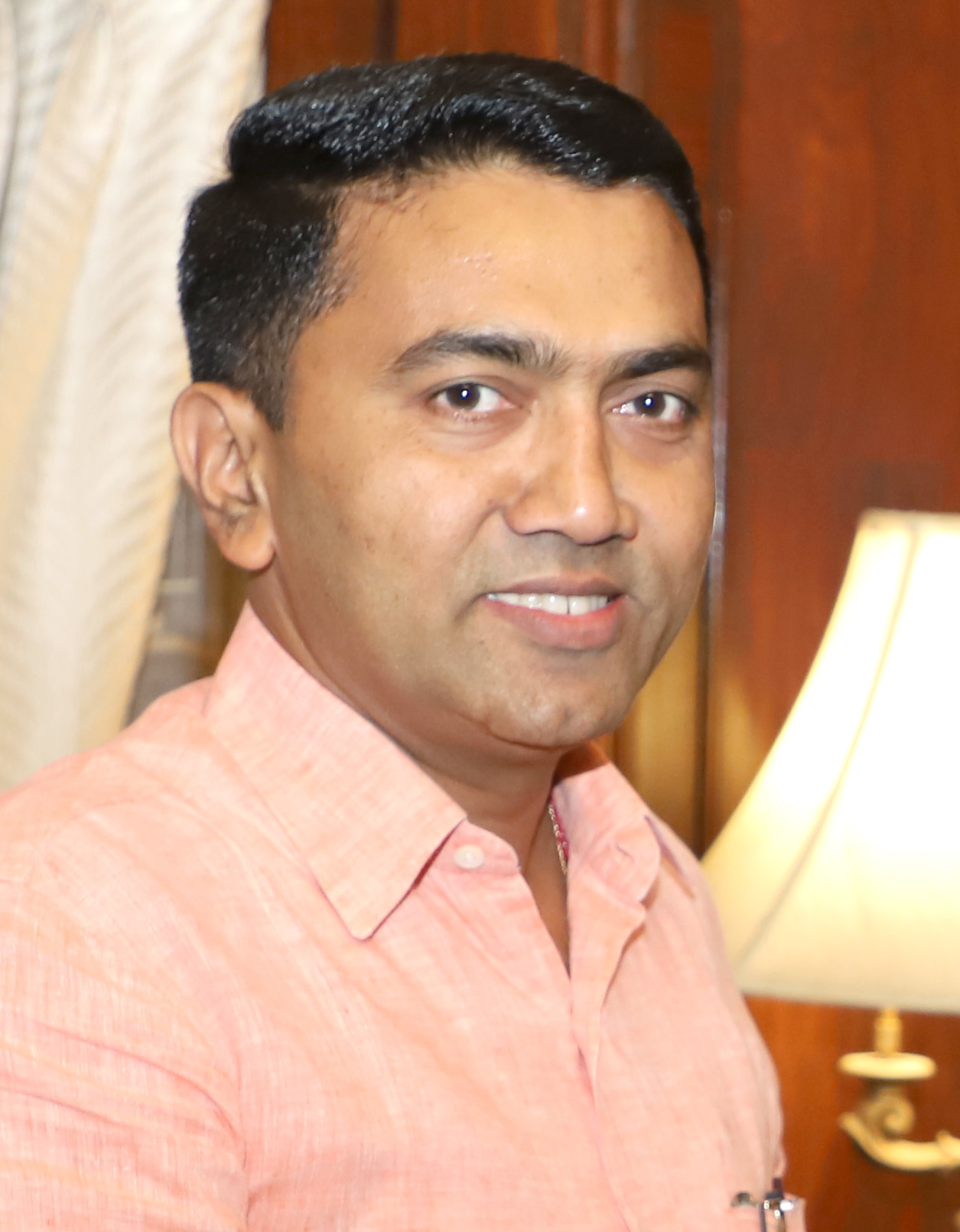
- Pramod Sawant
- Date formed: 19 March 2019
- Date dissolved: 15 March 2022

People and organisations
- Head of state: Governor: Mridula Sinha; Satyapal Malik; Bhagat Singh Koshyari (additional charge); P. S. Sreedharan Pillai
- Head of government: Pramod Sawant
- No. of ministers: 12
- Member parties: BJP; MGP; GFP; IND
- Status in legislature: Majority
- Opposition party: Indian National Congress
- Opposition leader: Digambar Kamat

History
- Election: 2017
- Predecessor: Third Manohar Parrikar Ministry
- Successor: Second Pramod Sawant ministry

The Pramod Sawant Ministry came into existence on 19 March 2019. He was serving as the Speaker of the Goa assembly before being sworn in as Chief Minister, after the death of the sitting chief minister Manohar Parrikar.

== Council of Ministers ==
The following is the list of the first Pramod Sawant Ministry.

SI No.	Name	Constituency	Department	Party
1	Pramod Sawant Chief Minister	Sanquelim	Home.; Finance.; Personnel.; Vigilance.; General Administration.; Departments Not Allotted To Any Minister.	BJP
Deputy Chief Ministers
2	Manohar Ajgaonkar Deputy Chief Minister	Pernem	Tourism.; Sports and Youth Affairs.; Printing and Stationery.; Official Language.; Public Grievances.	BJP
3	Chandrakant Kavlekar Deputy Chief Minister	Quepem	Agriculture.; Town and Country Planning.; Archives.; Archaeology.; Factories and Boilers.	BJP
Cabinet Ministers
4	Jennifer Monserrate	Taleigao	Revenue.; Information Technology.; Labour and Employment.	BJP
5	Mauvin Godinho	Dabolim	Panchayat Raj.; Animal Husbandry.; Veterinary Services.; Protocol.; Legislative Affairs.	BJP
6	Vishwajit Rane	Valpoi	Public Health.; Commerce and Industries.; Trade.; Women and Child Development.; Skill Development.	BJP
7	Nilesh Cabral	Curchorem	Power.; Non-Conventional Energy.; Legislative Affairs.	BJP

=== Former Ministers ===
SI No.	Name	Constituency	Department	Party
1	Sudin Dhavalikar Deputy Chief Minister	Marcaim	Public Works.; Transport.; River Navigation.; Museum.	MGP
2	Vijai Sardesai Deputy Chief Minister	Fatorda	Agriculture.; Town and Country Planning.; Archives and Archaeology.; Factories and Boilers.	GFP
3	Vinoda Paliencar	Siolim	Water Resources.; Fisheries.; Legal Metrology.	GFP
4	Jayesh Salgaonkar	Saligao	Housing.; Housing Board.; Rural Development Agency.; Ports.	GFP
5	Rohan Khaunte	Porvorim	Revenue.; Information Technology.; Labour and Employment.	IND
6	Milind Naik	Mormugao	Urban Development.; Social Welfare.; River Navigation.; Institute of Public Assistance (Provedoria).	BJP
7	Michael Lobo	Calangute	Science and technology.; Rural Development Agency.; Ports.; Waste Management.	BJP
8	Govind Gaude	Priol	Civil Supplies and Price Control.; Art and Culture.; Tribal Welfare.	IND
9	Deepak Pauskar	Sanvordem	Public Works; Handicrafts.; Textile and Coir.; Goa Gazetter.	BJP
10	Filipe Nery Rodrigues	Velim	Water Resources.; Fisheries.; Legal Metrology.	BJP

== List of ministers (by date) ==
=== Third Council of Ministers (since 19 March 2019) ===
Minister	Portfolio	Party
Pramod Sawant	Chief Minister: 1. Finance; 2. General Administration; 3. Home; 4. Personnel; 5. Vigilance	Bharatiya Janata Party
Sudin Dhavalikar	Deputy Chief Minister: 1. Public Works; 2. Transport; 3. River Navigation; 4. Museum	Maharashtrawadi Gomantak Party
Vijai Sardesai	Deputy Chief Minister: 1. Town and Country Planning; 2. Agriculture; 3. Archives and Archeology; 4. Factories and Boilers	Goa Forward Party
Manohar Ajgaonkar	1. Tourism; 2. Sports and Youth Affairs; 3. Printing and Stationery	Maharashtrawadi Gomantak Party
Rohan Khaunte	1. Revenue; 2. Information Technology; 3. Labour and Employment	Independent
Govind Gaude	1. Art and Culture; 2. Tribal Welfare; 3. Civil Supplies and Price Control	Independent
Vinoda Paliencar	1. Water Resources; 2. Fisheries; 3. Legal Metrology	Goa Forward Party
Jayesh Salgaonkar	1. Housing with Housing Board; 2. Rural Development; 3. Ports	Goa Forward Party
Mauvin Godinho	1. Panchayati Raj and Community Development; 2. Animal Husbandry and Veterinary Services; 3. Protocol	Bharatiya Janata Party
Vishwajit Pratapsingh Rane	1. Health; 2. Craftsmen Training; 3. Women and Child Development	Bharatiya Janata Party
Milind Naik	1. Urban Development; 2. Social Welfare; 3. Provedoria	Bharatiya Janata Party
Nilesh Cabral	1. Power including State Electrical Inspectorate; 2. Non Conventional Energy; 3. Law and Judiciary; 4. Legislature Affairs	Bharatiya Janata Party

== See also ==
- Third Manohar Parrikar Ministry
