= Third Parrikar ministry =

- Ministry of Goa
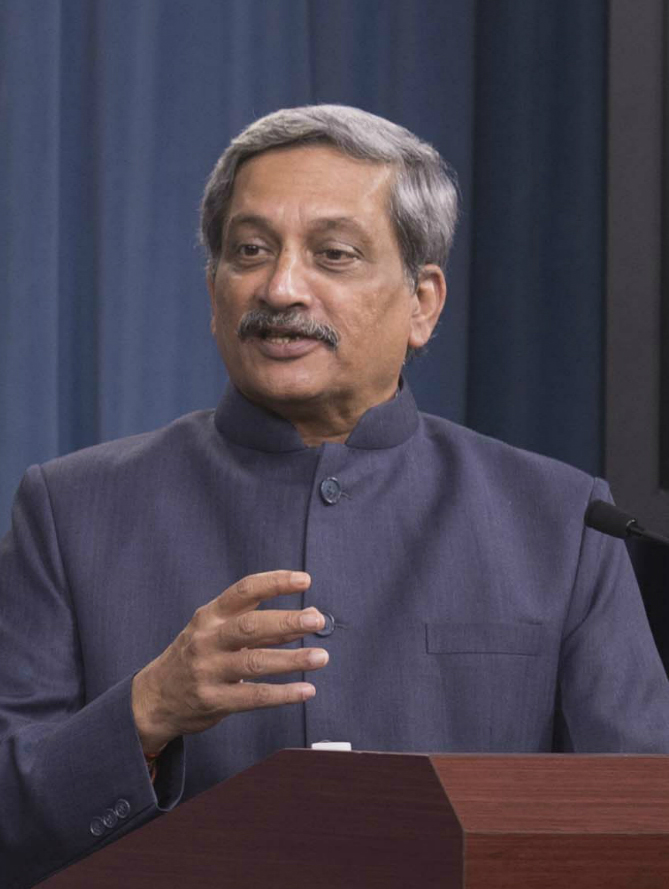
- Manohar Parrikar
- Date formed: 14 March 2017
- Date dissolved: 17 March 2019

People and organisations
- Head of state: Governor Mridula Sinha
- Head of government: Manohar Parrikar
- Member parties: BJP; MGP; GFP; IND
- Status in legislature: Coalition
- Opposition party: Indian National Congress
- Opposition leader: Chandrakant Kavlekar

History
- Election: 2017
- Legislature term: 2 years
- Predecessor: Laxmikant Parsekar Ministry
- Successor: Pramod Sawant Ministry

Third Manohar Parrikar Ministry is the Council of Ministers in Goa Legislative Assembly headed by Chief Minister Manohar Parrikar. Manohar Parrikar was sworn in as the 10th Chief Minister of Goa state and his government won the vote of confidence in the Goa Legislative Assembly on 16 March 2017. His government won the vote of confidence with the support of 22 MLAs in the 40-member Goa Legislative Assembly. During the trust vote, Parrikar was supported by the 12 MLAs of the Bharatiya Janata Party (Bharatiya Janata Party MLA Sidharth Kuncalienker did not vote since he was the pro tem Speaker), 3 MLAs of the Maharashtrawadi Gomantak Party, 3 MLAs of the Goa Forward Party, 3 Independent MLAs and the sole MLA of the Nationalist Congress Party.

Manohar Parrikar chaired the first meeting of his third Ministry on 17 March 2017.

The third Manohar Parrikar Ministry consists of Cabinet Ministers drawn from the Bharatiya Janata Party, Maharashtrawadi Gomantak Party, Goa Forward Party and also an independent.

The cabinet dissolved on 17 March 2019 after the death of Manohar Parrikar. Pramod Sawant serving Speaker of the Goa Legislative Assembly was sworn in as Chief Minister of Goa.

== Council of Ministers ==
The following is the list of the third Manohar Parrikar Ministry.

SI No.	Name	Constituency	Department	Party
1.	Manohar Parrikar Chief Minister	Panaji	Home.; Finance.; Personnel.; Vigilance.; General.; Departments Not Allotted To Any Minister.	BJP
Cabinet Ministers
2.	Sudin Dhavalikar	Marcaim	Public Works.; Transport.; River Navigation.; Museum.	MGP
3.	Vijai Sardesai	Fatorda	Agriculture.; Town and Country Planning.; Archives and Archaeology.; Factories and Boilers.	GFP
4.	Manohar Ajgaonkar	Pernem	Tourism.; Sports.; Printing and Stationery.	MGP
5.	Rohan Khaunte	Porvorim	Revenue.; Information Technology.; Labour and Employment.	IND
6.	Govind Gaude	Priol	Tribal Welfare.; Civil Supplies and Price Control.; Art and Culture.	IND
7.	Vinoda Paliencar	Siolim	Water Resources.; Fisheries.; Legal Metrology.	GFP
8.	Jayesh Salgaonkar	Saligao	Housing.; Housing Board.; Rural Development Agency.; Ports.	GFP
9.	Mauvin Godinho	Dabolim	Panchayat.; Animal Husbandry.; Veterinary Services.; Protocol.	BJP
10.	Vishwajit Rane	Valpoi	Health.; Craftsmen Training.; Women and Child Development.	BJP
11.	Milind Naik	Mormugao	Urban Development.; Social Welfare.; Provedoria.	BJP
12.	Nilesh Cabral	Curchorem	Power.; Non-Conventional Energy.; Law and Judiciary.; Legislative Affairs.	BJP

=== Former Members ===
- Francis Dsouza
- Pandurang Madkaikar

== Reshuffle ==
On 24 September 2018, a Cabinet reshuffle led to the removal of Francis D'Souza and Pandurang Madkaikar from the Cabinet. Both had been ill and hospitalised during the reshuffle. Since 25 July 2018, the portfolios allocated to them were being looked after by Chief Minister Manohar Parrikar.

The reshuffle caused the induction of Milind Naik and Nilesh Cabral into the Ministry.

== List of ministers (by date) ==
In March 2017, the Bharatiya Janata Party formed a coalition government with its 14 MLAs, 3 Goa Forward Party MLAs, 3 Maharashtrawadi Gomantak Party MLAs, and 3 Independents MLAs.

Minister	Portfolio	Party	Took office	Left office
Manohar Parrikar	Chief Minister: 1. Finance; 2. General Administration; 3. Home; 4. Personnel; 5. Vigilance	Bharatiya Janata Party	17 March 2017	24 September 2018
Sudin Dhavalikar	1. Public Works; 2. Transport; 3. River Navigation; 4. Museum	Maharashtrawadi Gomantak Party	17 March 2017	24 September 2018
Vijai Sardesai	1. Town and Country Planning; 2. Agriculture; 3. Archives and Archeology; 4. Factories and Boilers	Goa Forward Party	17 March 2017	24 September 2018
Francis D'Souza	1. Urban Development; 2. Law and Judiciary; 3. Legislature Affairs; 4. Provedoria	Bharatiya Janata Party	17 March 2017	24 September 2018
Manohar Ajgaonkar	1. Tourism; 2. Sports and Youth Affairs; 3. Printing and Stationery	Maharashtrawadi Gomantak Party	17 March 2017	24 September 2018
Rohan Khaunte	1. Revenue; 2. Information Technology; 3. Labour and Employment	Independent	17 March 2017	24 September 2018
Pandurang Madkaikar	1. Power including State Electrical Inspectorate; 2. Social Welfare; 3. Non Conventional Energy	Bharatiya Janata Party	17 March 2017	24 September 2018
Govind Gaude	1. Art and Culture; 2. Tribal Welfare; 3. Civil Supplies and Price Control	Independent	17 March 2017	24 September 2018
Vinoda Paliencar	1. Water Resources; 2. Fisheries; 3. Legal Metrology	Goa Forward Party	17 March 2017	24 September 2018
Jayesh Salgaonkar	1. Housing with Housing Board; 2. Rural Development; 3. Ports	Goa Forward Party	17 March 2017	24 September 2018
Mauvin Godinho	1. Panchayati Raj and Community Development; 2. Animal Husbandry and Veterinary Services; 3. Protocol	Bharatiya Janata Party	17 March 2017	24 September 2018
Vishwajit Pratapsingh Rane	1. Health; 2. Craftsmen Training; 3. Women and Child Development	Bharatiya Janata Party	17 March 2017	24 September 2018

=== Second Council of Ministers (24 September 2018–18 March 2019) ===
Minister	Portfolio	Party	Took office	Left office
Manohar Parrikar	Chief Minister: 1. Finance; 2. General Administration; 3. Home; 4. Personnel; 5. Vigilance	Bharatiya Janata Party	24 September 2018	18 March 2019
Sudin Dhavalikar	1. Public Works; 2. Transport; 3. River Navigation; 4. Museum	Maharashtrawadi Gomantak Party	24 September 2018	18 March 2019
Vijai Sardesai	1. Town and Country Planning; 2. Agriculture; 3. Archives and Archeology; 4. Factories and Boilers	Goa Forward Party	24 September 2018	18 March 2019
Manohar Ajgaonkar	1. Tourism; 2. Sports and Youth Affairs; 3. Printing and Stationery	Maharashtrawadi Gomantak Party	24 September 2018	18 March 2019
Rohan Khaunte	1. Revenue; 2. Information Technology; 3. Labour and Employment	Independent	24 September 2018	18 March 2019
Govind Gaude	1. Art and Culture; 2. Tribal Welfare; 3. Civil Supplies and Price Control	Independent	24 September 2018	18 March 2019
Vinoda Paliencar	1. Water Resources; 2. Fisheries; 3. Legal Metrology	Goa Forward Party	24 September 2018	18 March 2019
Jayesh Salgaonkar	1. Housing with Housing Board; 2. Rural Development; 3. Ports	Goa Forward Party	24 September 2018	18 March 2019
Mauvin Godinho	1. Panchayati Raj and Community Development; 2. Animal Husbandry and Veterinary Services; 3. Protocol	Bharatiya Janata Party	24 September 2018	18 March 2019
Vishwajit Pratapsingh Rane	1. Health; 2. Craftsmen Training; 3. Women and Child Development	Bharatiya Janata Party	24 September 2018	18 March 2019
Milind Naik	1. Urban Development; 2. Social Welfare; 3. Provedoria	Bharatiya Janata Party	24 September 2018	18 March 2019
Nilesh Cabral	1. Power including State Electrical Inspectorate; 2. Non Conventional Energy; 3. Law and Judiciary; 4. Legislature Affairs	Bharatiya Janata Party	24 September 2018	18 March 2019
