= Second Pramod Sawant ministry =

Goa state administration

- 26th Ministry of Goa
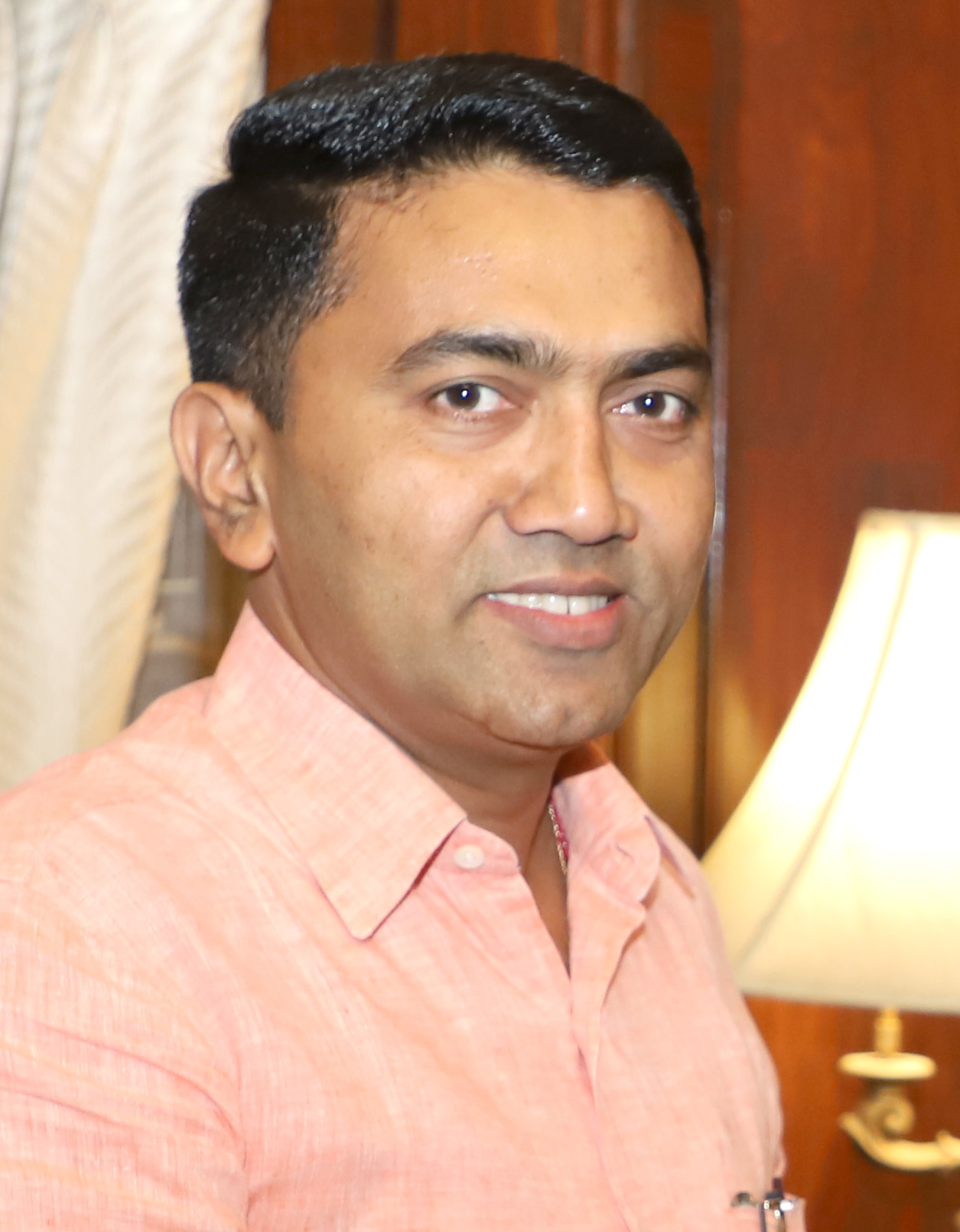
- Pramod Sawant
- Date formed: 28 March 2022

People and organisations
- Governor: Governor: P. S. Sreedharan Pillai; Ashok Gajapathi Raju
- Chief Minister: Pramod Sawant
- Member parties: BJP; MGP; IND
- Status in legislature: Majority
- Opposition leader: Yuri Alemao

History
- Election: 2022
- Predecessor: First Pramod Sawant ministry

The Second Pramod Sawant Ministry came into existence on 28 March 2022. He was serving as the caretaker Chief Minister of Goa before being sworn in as Chief Minister.

== Council of Ministers ==
Portfolio	Minister	Took office	Left office	Party	Ref
Chief Minister; Home; Finance; Vigilance; Official Languages; Personnel; RDA; Other departments not allocated to any Minister	Pramod Sawant	28 March 2022	Incumbent	BJP	
Health; Urban Development; TCP; Women & Child; Forest	Vishwajit Pratapsingh Rane	28 March 2022	Incumbent	BJP	
WRD; Co-operation; Provedoria	Subhash Shirodkar	28 March 2022	Incumbent	BJP	
Transport; Industries; Panchayat; Protocol	Mauvin Godinho	28 March 2022	Incumbent	BJP	
Tourism; IT; Printing & Stationery	Rohan Khaunte	28 March 2022	Incumbent	BJP	
Revenue; Labour & Employment; Waste Management	Atanasio Monserrate	28 March 2022	Incumbent	BJP	
Social Welfare; River Navigation; Drinking Water; Empowering People with Disabilities	Subhash Phal Desai	9 April 2022	Incumbent	BJP	
Power; New and Renewable Energy; Museum	Sudin Dhavalikar	9 April 2022	Incumbent	MGP	
Fisheries; Animal Husbandry & Veterinary Services; Factories and Boilers	Nilkanth Halarnkar	9 April 2022	Incumbent	BJP	
Public Works Department; Captain of Ports; Legal Metrology	Digambar Kamat	21 August 2025	Incumbent	BJP	
Art & Culture; Sports & Youth Affairs; Tribal Welfare	Ramesh Tawadkar	21 August 2025	Incumbent	BJP	
TBD	Sankalp Amonkar	7 November 2026	Incumbent	BJP	

== Former Ministers ==
Portfolio	Minister	Took office	Left office	Party	Ref
Public Works Department; Law & Judiciary; Environment	Nilesh Cabral	28 March 2022	19 November 2023	BJP	
Sports; Art & Culture; RDA	Govind Gaude	28 March 2022	18 June 2025	BJP	
Legislative Affairs; Environment; Law & Judiciary	Aleixo Sequeira	19 November 2023	20 August 2025	BJP	
Agriculture; Handicrafts; Civil Supplies	Ravi Naik	28 March 2022	15 October 2025	BJP	
