= List of deputy chief ministers of Goa =

Goa's third most important office

Deputy Chief Minister of Goa
- Incumbent "Vacant" since 15 March 2022
- Deputy Chief Minister's Office (Goa)
- Style: The Honourable
- Status: Deputy Head of Government
- Abbreviation: DCM
- Member of: Goa Legislative Assembly; Cabinet
- Nominator: Chief Minister of Goa
- Appointer: Governor of Goa
- Term length: At the confidence of the assembly; 5 years and is subject to no term limits.
- Inaugural holder: Wilfred de Souza
- Formation: 16 January 1980 (46 years ago)

The deputy chief minister of Goa is a position of the Cabinet in the Government of Goa. The post is currently vacant.The position of deputy chief minister is not explicitly defined or mentioned in the Constitution of India.

However, the Supreme Court of India has stated that the appointment of deputy chief ministers is not unconstitutional. The court has clarified that a deputy chief minister, for all practical purposes, remains a minister in the council of ministers headed by the chief minister and does not draw a higher salary or perks compared to other ministers.During the absence of the chief minister, the deputy-chief minister may chair cabinet meetings and lead the assembly majority. Various deputy chief ministers have also taken the oath of secrecy in line with the one that chief minister takes. This oath has also sparked controversies.

== Deputy chief ministers ==
The list of deputy chief ministers in the Indian state of Goa include:

Keys: BJP GPF INC MGP NCP GPC IND

Sr. No.	Name	Term of office			Political party	Chief Minister
1	Wilfred de Souza	16 January 1980	18 September 1983	2 years, 245 days	Indian National Congress (Urs)	Pratapsingh Rane
2	Ramakant Khalap	27 March 1990	14 April 1990	262 days	Maharashtrawadi Gomantak Party	Churchill Alemao
2	Ramakant Khalap	14 April 1990	14 December 1990	262 days	Maharashtrawadi Gomantak Party	Luis Proto Barbosa
1	Wilfred de Souza	25 January 1991	18 May 1993	2 years, 113 days	Indian National Congress	Ravi S. Naik
1	Wilfred de Souza	16 December 1994	29 July 1998	3 years, 225 days	Indian National Congress	Pratapsingh Rane
3	Dayanand Narvekar	24 November 1999	23 October 2000	334 days	Goa People's Congress	Francisco Sardinha
4	Ravi S. Naik	24 October 2000	3 June 2002	1 year, 222 days	Maharashtrawadi Gomantak Party	Manohar Parrikar
5	Filipe Nery Rodrigues	3 February 2005	4 March 2005	29 days	Independent	Pratapsingh Rane
1	Wilfred de Souza	7 June 2005	7 June 2007	2 years, 0 days	Nationalist Congress Party	Pratapsingh Rane
6	Francis D'Souza	9 March 2012	8 November 2014	5 years, 5 days	Bharatiya Janata Party	Manohar Parrikar
6	Francis D'Souza	8 November 2014	14 March 2017	5 years, 5 days	Bharatiya Janata Party	Laxmikant Parsekar
7	Sudin Dhavalikar	19 March 2019	27 March 2019	8 days	Maharashtrawadi Gomantak Party	Pramod Sawant
7	Vijai Sardesai	19 March 2019	13 July 2019	116 days	Goa Forward Party	Pramod Sawant
8	Babu Ajgaonkar	28 March 2019	15 March 2022	2 years, 245 days	Bharatiya Janata Party	Pramod Sawant
9	Babu Kavlekar	13 July 2019	15 March 2022	2 years, 245 days	Bharatiya Janata Party	Pramod Sawant

== Oath as the state deputy chief minister ==
The deputy chief minister serves five years in the office. The following is the oath of the Deputy chief minister of state:

I, <Name of Deputy Chief Minister>, do swear in the name of God/solemnly affirm that I will bear true faith and allegiance to the Constitution of India as by law established, that I will uphold the sovereignty and integrity of India, that I will faithfully and conscientiously discharge my duties as a Minister for the State of () and that I will do right to all manner of people in accordance with the Constitution and the law without fear or favour, affection or ill-will.

Oath of Secrecy

"I, [Name], do swear in the name of God / solemnly affirm that I will not directly or indirectly communicate or reveal to any person or persons any matter which shall be brought under my consideration or shall become known to me as a Minister for the State of [Name of State] except as may be required for the due discharge of my duties as such Minister."
