= Deepak Pauskar =

Indian politician

Member of Goa Legislative Assembly
- In office 2017–2022
- Preceded by: Ganesh Gaonkar
- Succeeded by: Ganesh Gaonkar
- Constituency: Sanvordem

Personal details
- Born: Deepak Chandrakant Prabhu Pauskar; 18 October 1973 (age 52) Dharbandora, Goa
- Party: Independent
- Other political affiliations: Maharashtrawadi Gomantak Party, Bharatiya Janata Party
- Parent: Chandrakant Prabhu (father)
- Education: Diploma ( Mining) Government Politechnic Goa, Year of Passing In 1992
- Profession: Transport Contractor

Deepak Chandrakant Prabhu Pauskar is an Indian politician. He was elected to the Goa Legislative Assembly from Sanvordem in the 2017 Goa Legislative Assembly election as a member of the Maharashtrawadi Gomantak Party. He was Minister of Public Works and Museum in the first Pramod Sawant ministry. In March 2019, Babu Ajgaonkar and Pauskar joined the Bharatiya Janata Party thus minimizing Maharashtrawadi Gomantak Party to one seat in the Goa Legislative Assembly.
