= Pravin Arlekar =

Indian politician

Member of Goa Legislative Assembly
- Incumbent
- Assumed office 10 March 2022
- Preceded by: Manohar Ajgaonkar
- Constituency: Pernem

Personal details
- Born: Pravin Prabhakar Arlekar
- Party: Bharatiya Janata Party (2022- till date)
- Other political affiliations: Maharashtrawadi Gomantak Party
- Education: 8th Pass
- Alma mater: Mark Fernandes Memorial High School
- Profession: Business

Pravin Prabhakar Arlekar is an Indian politician and a member of the Goa Legislative Assembly. He won the Pernem Assembly constituency on the Bharatiya Janata Party ticket in the 2022 Goa Legislative Assembly election.
