= Pandurang Madkaikar =

Indian politician (born 1964)

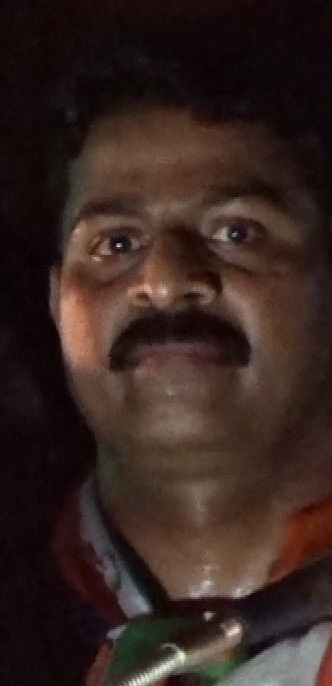
- Madkaikar in 2016

Member of Goa Legislative Assembly
- In office 2002–2017
- Preceded by: Nirmala Sawant
- Succeeded by: Rajesh Faldessai
- Constituency: Cumbarjua

Personal details
- Born: 10 September 1964 (age 62)
- Other political affiliations: Indian National Congress; Maharashtrawadi Gomantak Party

Pandurang Arjun Madkaikar (born 10 September 1964) is an Indian politician and a former cabinet minister in the Government of Goa. He is member of the Bharatiya Janata Party and a former member of the Goa Legislative Assembly from the Cumbarjua constituency.

== Personal life ==
Pandurang Madkaikar was born on 10 September 1964. His wife Janita served as the sarpanch of the Old Goa Village Panchayat.

== Political career ==
Madkaikar was first elected to the Goa Legislative Assembly from the Cumbarjua constituency in 2002 Assembly elections as a candidate of the Maharashtrawadi Gomantak Party and became the Transport Minister of Goa in the coalition government headed by Manohar Parrikar. He joined the Bharatiya Janata Party in 2003 In January 2005, Madkaikar was also allotted the portfolios of Revenue as well as Printing & Stationery.

He quit the Bharatiya Janata Party in 2005 to join the Indian National Congress, resigning as a MLA on 29 January 2005, thereby causing the collapse of the Manohar Parrikar Ministry.

Madkaikar won a by-election in 2005 to the Goa Legislative Assembly the Cumbarjua constituency as a candidate of the Indian National Congress. He was inducted in the Pratapsingh Rane Ministry and served as the Minister for Transport, River Navigation and Sports & Youth Affairs.

In the 2007 Goa Assembly election, Madkaikar won the Cumbarjua constituency as a candidate of the Indian National Congress. He was appointed a Cabinet Minister in the Digambar Kamat Ministry on 25 June 2007 with the portfolios of Transport and Social Welfare. Madkaikar was also allocated the portfolio of River Navigation on 17 December 2007. He was dropped from the Cabinet on 12 March 2008.

Madkaikar served as the Chairman of the newly established Goa Commission for Scheduled Castes and Scheduled Tribes from 14 February 2011 to 25 January 2012.

Madkaikar won the 2012 Goa Legislative Assembly election from the Cumbarjua constituency as an Indian National Congress candidate. In December 2016, he resigned as a MLA to join the Bharatiya Janata Party. He successfully contested the 2017 Goa Assembly election from Cumbarjua as a Bharatiya Janata Party candidate.

Madkaikar served as the Minister for Power, Social Welfare and Non-Conventional Energy in the third Manohar Parrikar ministry from 14 March 2017 to 24 September 2018. In June 2018, Madkaikar suffered a brain stroke in Mumbai following which he was admitted to the Kokilaben Dhirubhai Ambani Hospital. He underwent a surgery and is currently recovering.

Since 25 July 2018, the portfolios allotted to Madkaikar were being looked after by Chief Minister Manohar Parrikar during the period of his absence. On 24 September 2018, Madkaikar was dropped from the Cabinet along with Francis D'Souza.
