= Nirmala Sawant =

Indian politician

Member of Goa Legislative Assembly
- In office 1999–2002
- Preceded by: Krishna Kuttikar
- Succeeded by: Pandurang Madkaikar
- Constituency: Cumbarjua

Personal details
- Born: 2 November 1946 (age 79) Marcel, Portuguese Goa
- Party: Indian National Congress
- Spouse: Prabhakar Sawant

Nirmala Sawant is an Indian politician and environmental activist from Goa. She has served as a member of the Goa Legislative Assembly from Cumbarjua Assembly constituency and has been actively involved in various social and environmental causes.

== Early life ==
Nirmala Sawant was born on 2 November 1946 at Marcel, Portuguese Goa. She has studied and obtained an M.A. in Economics, followed by a B.Ed. and an L.L.B. soon after. She is married to Prabhakar Sawant.

== Political career ==
Sawant represented the Cumbarjua Assembly constituency as a Member of the Goa Legislative Assembly. During her tenure, she addressed issues pertinent to her constituency and the state. In 2012, she raised concerns about the inclusion of approximately 1,500 alleged bogus voters in the electoral roll of Cumbarjua, emphasizing the potential impact on election outcomes. She was the Minister of Forests between 8 June 1999 and 24 November 1999.

== Environmentalism ==
As a founding member and convenor of the Mhadei Bachao Abhiyan (MBA), Sawant has been at the forefront of efforts to protect the Mhadei River. She has consistently urged the Goa government to take decisive action against the diversion of the river's waters, highlighting the potential adverse effects on Goa's environment and water resources. In January 2025, she urged the state government to request an exclusive date for the Mhadei water dispute hearing in the Supreme Court, emphasizing the urgency of the matter.

== Other work ==
She has been a Member of the Editorial Board of textbooks to teach Konkani in high schools.

== Personal life ==
She is married to Prabhakar Sawant.

During the COVID-19 pandemic in India, Sawant obtained a diploma in Sanskrit. She mentioned that while activities were halted during the pandemic, she dedicated her time to learning the language.
