= Cumbarjua Assembly constituency =

Legislative Assembly constituency in Goa State, India

Coordinates: 15.51°N 73.95°E

Cumbarjua
- Constituency No. 15 for the Goa Legislative Assembly

Constituency details
- Country: India
- Region: Western India
- State: Goa
- District: North Goa
- Lok Sabha constituency: North Goa
- Established: 1963 (as St. Estevam); 1977 (as Cumbarjua)
- Total electors: 26,601
- Reservation: None

Member of Legislative Assembly
- 8th Goa Legislative Assembly
- Incumbent Rajesh Faldessai
- Party: Bharatiya Janata Party

Cumbarjua Assembly constituency is one of the 40 Goa Legislative Assembly constituencies of the state of Goa in southern India. Cumbarjua is also one of the 20 constituencies falling under North Goa Lok Sabha constituency.

== Members of Legislative Assembly ==
| Year | Member | Party |
St. Estevam
| 1963 | Chopdenkar Dattaram Keshav | Maharashtrawadi Gomantak Party |
| 1967 | Bhakal Pratap Shrinivas | Maharashtrawadi Gomantak Party |
| 1972 | Vinayak Chodankar | Maharashtrawadi Gomantak Party |
Cumbarjua
| 1977 | Vinayak Chodankar | Maharashtrawadi Gomantak Party |
| 1980 | Vinayak Chodankar | Maharashtrawadi Gomantak Party |
| 1984 | Kashinath Jalmi | Maharashtrawadi Gomantak Party |
| 1989 | Dharma Chodankar | Maharashtrawadi Gomantak Party |
| 1994 | Krishna Kuttikar | Indian National Congress |
| 1999 | Nirmala Sawant | Indian National Congress |
| 2002 | Pandurang Madkaikar | Maharashtrawadi Gomantak Party |
| 2005^ | Pandurang Madkaikar | Indian National Congress |
| 2007 | Pandurang Madkaikar | Indian National Congress |
| 2012 | Pandurang Madkaikar | Indian National Congress |
| 2017 | Pandurang Madkaikar | Bharatiya Janata Party |
| 2022 | Rajesh Faldessai | Indian National Congress (Note: Elected as Indian National Congress. Switched to BJP in Sept 2022) |

^By-election

== Election results ==
=== 2027 Assembly election ===
2027 Goa Legislative Assembly election: Cumbarjua
| Party | Candidate | Votes | % | ±% |
|---|---|---|---|---|
| INC | | | | |
| NDA | | | | |
| NOTA | None of the above | | | |
| Majority | | | | |
| Turnout | | | | |
| gain from | | Swing | | |

=== Assembly Election 2022 ===
2022 Goa Legislative Assembly election : Cumbarjua
| Party | Candidate | Votes | % | ±% |
|---|---|---|---|---|
| INC | Rajesh Faldessai | 6,776 | 31.30% | ▲12.03 |
| BJP | Janita Pandurang Madkaikar | 3,949 | 18.24% | ▼42.06 |
| Independent | Rohan Ranganath Harmalkar | 3,870 | 17.88% | New |
| AITC | Samil Audumber Volvaiker | 3,072 | 14.19% | New |
| RGP | Chhagan Narayan Naik | 2,442 | 11.28% | New |
| AAP | Gorakhanath Suresh Kerkar | 1,022 | 4.72% | ▼6.93 |
| NOTA | None of the Above | 328 | 1.52% | ▼0.18 |
| Margin of victory | | 2,827 | 13.06% | ▼27.97 |
| Turnout | | 21,648 | 79.78% | ▼0.66 |
| Registered electors | | 26,601 | | ▲6.17 |
| INC gain from BJP | | Swing | ▼29.00 | |

=== Assembly Election 2017 ===
2017 Goa Legislative Assembly election : Cumbarjua
| Party | Candidate | Votes | % | ±% |
|---|---|---|---|---|
| BJP | Pandurang Madkaikar | 12,395 | 60.30% | New |
| INC | Xavier Fialho | 3,961 | 19.27% | ▼28.88 |
| AAP | Prakash Dattaram Naik | 2,394 | 11.65% | New |
| Independent | Vishal Shambu Volvoikar | 990 | 4.82% | New |
| Independent | Prasad Harmalkar | 468 | 2.28% | New |
| NOTA | None of the Above | 348 | 1.69% | New |
| Margin of victory | | 8,434 | 41.03% | ▲33.09 |
| Turnout | | 20,556 | 82.04% | ▼1.49 |
| Registered electors | | 25,055 | | ▲5.46 |
| BJP gain from INC | | Swing | ▲12.15 | |

=== Assembly Election 2012 ===
2012 Goa Legislative Assembly election : Cumbarjua
| Party | Candidate | Votes | % | ±% |
|---|---|---|---|---|
| INC | Pandurang Madkaikar | 9,556 | 48.15% | ▼1.08 |
| Independent | Nirmala P. Sawant | 7,981 | 40.21% | New |
| Independent | Jose Bismarque Desidorio Dias | 1,996 | 10.06% | New |
| Jai Maha Bharath Party | Pramod Naik | 155 | 0.78% | New |
| Independent | Gaurish M. Dessai | 129 | 0.65% | New |
| Margin of victory | | 1,575 | 7.94% | ▲5.13 |
| Turnout | | 19,846 | 83.42% | ▲10.31 |
| Registered electors | | 23,757 | | ▼14.50 |
| INC hold | | Swing | ▼1.08 | |

=== Assembly Election 2007 ===
2007 Goa Legislative Assembly election : Cumbarjua
| Party | Candidate | Votes | % | ±% |
|---|---|---|---|---|
| INC | Pandurang Madkaikar | 10,016 | 49.23% | ▲3.72 |
| Independent | Nirmala P. Sawant | 9,445 | 46.42% | New |
| MGP | Bhomkar Nilkant | 592 | 2.91% | ▲0.08 |
| Independent | Fernandes Rodalph | 267 | 1.31% | New |
| Margin of victory | | 571 | 2.81% | ▼17.37 |
| Turnout | | 20,345 | 73.13% | ▲2.72 |
| Registered electors | | 27,785 | | ▲5.29 |
| INC hold | | Swing | ▲3.72 | |

=== Assembly By-election 2005 ===
2005 Goa Legislative Assembly by-election : Cumbarjua
| Party | Candidate | Votes | % | ±% |
|---|---|---|---|---|
| INC | Pandurang A. Madakaikar | 8,468 | 45.51% | ▲11.44 |
| Independent | Nirmala P. Sawant | 4,713 | 25.33% | New |
| BJP | Krishna Saju Kuttikar | 4,637 | 24.92% | ▼0.02 |
| MGP | Vijay Kumar Anant Shet | 526 | 2.83% | ▼34.73 |
| CPI | Christopher Fonseca | 251 | 1.35% | New |
| Margin of victory | | 3,755 | 20.18% | ▲16.69 |
| Turnout | | 18,607 | 70.46% | ▲2.63 |
| Registered electors | | 26,390 | | ▲2.77 |
| INC gain from MGP | | Swing | ▲7.96 | |

=== Assembly Election 2002 ===
2002 Goa Legislative Assembly election : Cumbarjua
| Party | Candidate | Votes | % | ±% |
|---|---|---|---|---|
| MGP | Pandurang Madkaikar | 6,546 | 37.55% | New |
| INC | Nirmala P. Sawant | 5,938 | 34.07% | ▼3.08 |
| BJP | Parvatakar Govind | 4,347 | 24.94% | New |
| NCP | Lawrence Minguel Thomas | 334 | 1.92% | New |
| SS | Anand Moso Gad | 255 | 1.46% | New |
| Margin of victory | | 608 | 3.49% | ▼1.77 |
| Turnout | | 17,431 | 67.84% | ▲3.06 |
| Registered electors | | 25,679 | | ▲2.98 |
| MGP gain from INC | | Swing | ▲0.41 | |

=== Assembly Election 1999 ===
1999 Goa Legislative Assembly election : Cumbarjua
| Party | Candidate | Votes | % | ±% |
|---|---|---|---|---|
| INC | Nirmala Prabhakar Sawant | 6,004 | 37.15% | ▼5.07 |
| BJP | Parvatkar Govind Bhikaji | 5,154 | 31.89% | New |
| MGP | Chodankar Dharma Vassudev | 2,185 | 13.52% | New |
| Independent | Lawrence Minguel Thomas | 1,659 | 10.26% | New |
| Independent | Naik Raikar Arun | 678 | 4.19% | New |
| Independent | Henriques Gandhi | 244 | 1.51% | New |
| Independent | Shet Govekar Surendra | 224 | 1.39% | New |
| Margin of victory | | 850 | 5.26% | ▲3.32 |
| Turnout | | 16,163 | 64.76% | ▼3.10 |
| Registered electors | | 24,935 | | ▲6.13 |
| INC hold | | Swing | ▼5.07 | |

=== Assembly Election 1994 ===
1994 Goa Legislative Assembly election : Cumbarjua
| Party | Candidate | Votes | % | ±% |
|---|---|---|---|---|
| INC | Kuttikar Krishna Saju | 6,738 | 42.22% | New |
| MGP | Chodankar Dharma Vassudev | 6,428 | 40.28% | |
| Independent | Emidio F. Monteiro | 1,312 | 8.22% | New |
| BSP | Shirodkar Guru Inacio | 378 | 2.37% | New |
| Independent | Gonsalves Bernardo Oscar | 237 | 1.49% | New |
| CPI | Jalmi Uttam Jivlo | 204 | 1.28% | New |
| Independent | Rego Anthony Joaquim M. | 122 | 0.76% | New |
| Margin of victory | | 310 | 1.94% | ▼1.08 |
| Turnout | | 15,959 | 66.80% | ▼5.63 |
| Registered electors | | 23,495 | | ▲14.63 |
| INC gain from MGP | | Swing | ▲4.78 | |

=== Assembly Election 1989 ===
1989 Goa Legislative Assembly election : Cumbarjua
| Party | Candidate | Votes | % | ±% |
|---|---|---|---|---|
| MGP | Dharma Vassudeo Chodankar | 5,645 | 37.44% | ▲8.73 |
| INC | Nirmala P. Sawant | 5,189 | 34.42% | New |
| Independent | Emidio Fenelon Monteiro | 2,466 | 16.36% | New |
| CPI | Cristopher Lourence Fonseca | 697 | 4.37% | New |
| BJP | Shripad Yesso Naik | 451 | 2.83% | New |
| Independent | Anand Narayan Chondankar | 125 | 0.78% | New |
| Margin of victory | | 456 | 3.02% | ▼0.48 |
| Turnout | | 15,076 | 71.52% | ▲4.07 |
| Registered electors | | 20,496 | | ▲9.89 |
| MGP hold | | Swing | ▲8.73 | |

=== Assembly Election 1984 ===
1984 Goa, Daman and Diu Legislative Assembly election : Cumbarjua
| Party | Candidate | Votes | % | ±% |
|---|---|---|---|---|
| MGP | Kashinath Jalmi | 3,721 | 28.71% | ▼11.35 |
| INC | Mahambre Premanand Parshuram | 3,267 | 25.21% | New |
| Independent | Abreu Domingo Napodeao | 2,237 | 17.26% | New |
| Independent | Fernandes Peter Fatima Jeronimo | 1,443 | 11.13% | New |
| Independent | Chodankar Vinayak Dharma | 1,368 | 10.56% | New |
| Independent | Bandodkar Sitaram Ramnath | 247 | 1.91% | New |
| Margin of victory | | 454 | 3.50% | ▼10.74 |
| Turnout | | 12,960 | 66.86% | ▼1.31 |
| Registered electors | | 18,651 | | ▲8.49 |
| MGP hold | | Swing | ▼11.35 | |

=== Assembly Election 1980 ===
1980 Goa, Daman and Diu Legislative Assembly election : Cumbarjua
| Party | Candidate | Votes | % | ±% |
|---|---|---|---|---|
| MGP | Chodankar Vinayak Dharma | 4,876 | 40.07% | ▼8.00 |
| Independent | Mayenkar Mukund Narayan | 3,143 | 25.83% | New |
| INC(I) | Shenvi Kunkalekar Vassant Vithal | 1,747 | 14.35% | New |
| JP(S) | Dessai Shrikant Govind | 1,427 | 11.73% | New |
| JP | Phadte Bandodkar Sitaram Ramnath | 176 | 1.45% | New |
| Independent | Monteiro Emidio Fenelon | 165 | 1.36% | New |
| Independent | Cosme Mario Damiao | 138 | 1.13% | New |
| Margin of victory | | 1,733 | 14.24% | ▲5.20 |
| Turnout | | 12,170 | 68.58% | ▲7.27 |
| Registered electors | | 17,191 | | ▲2.02 |
| MGP hold | | Swing | ▼8.00 | |

=== Assembly Election 1977 ===
1977 Goa, Daman and Diu Legislative Assembly election : Cumbarjua
| Party | Candidate | Votes | % | ±% |
|---|---|---|---|---|
| MGP | Ghodankar Vinayak Dharma | 5,145 | 48.07% | New |
| JP | Desai Shrikant Govind | 4,177 | 39.02% | New |
| INC | Parab Gaonker Manohar Gajanan | 1,059 | 9.89% | New |
| Independent | Bandodkar Sitaram Ramnath | 139 | 1.30% | New |
| Margin of victory | | 968 | 9.04% | |
| Turnout | | 10,704 | 62.78% | |
| Registered electors | | 16,850 | | |
| MGP win (new seat) | | | | |

=== Assembly Election 1972 ===
1972 Goa, Daman and Diu Legislative Assembly election : St. Estevam
| Party | Candidate | Votes | % | ±% |
|---|---|---|---|---|
| MGP | Chodankar Vinayak Dharma | 5,956 | 53.27% | ▲0.46 |
| UGP | P. P. Desai Shrikant Govind | 3,530 | 31.57% | ▼1.88 |
| INC | Priolkar Prafull Vaikunt | 934 | 8.35% | New |
| MGP | Waman Radhakrishna | 353 | 3.16% | ▼49.65 |
| Independent | Mukund Martu Shet | 157 | 1.40% | New |
| Margin of victory | | 2,426 | 21.70% | ▲2.34 |
| Turnout | | 11,181 | 72.28% | ▲4.31 |
| Registered electors | | 15,121 | | ▲5.00 |
| MGP hold | | Swing | ▲0.46 | |

=== Assembly Election 1967 ===
1967 Goa, Daman and Diu Legislative Assembly election : St. Estevam
| Party | Candidate | Votes | % | ±% |
|---|---|---|---|---|
| MGP | B. P. Shrinivas | 5,296 | 52.81% | New |
| UGP | J. T. Timotio | 3,355 | 33.46% | New |
| Independent | C. V. Dharma | 462 | 4.61% | New |
| Independent | F. J. Damaciand | 258 | 2.57% | New |
| Independent | N. N. Hari | 79 | 0.79% | New |
| Independent | C. N. Shamba | 71 | 0.71% | New |
| Independent | D. C. M. Abreu | 71 | 0.71% | New |
| Margin of victory | | 1,941 | 19.36% | |
| Turnout | | 10,028 | 67.27% | |
| Registered electors | | 14,401 | | |
| MGP win (new seat) | | | | |

== See also ==
- List of constituencies of the Goa Legislative Assembly
- North Goa district
