= Kedar Naik =

Indian politician (born 1978)

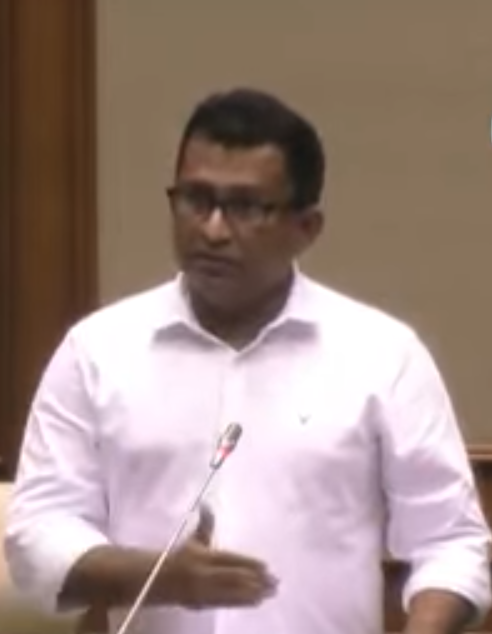
- Naik in 2024

Member of Goa Legislative Assembly
- Incumbent
- Assumed office 10 March 2022
- Preceded by: Jayesh Salgaonkar
- Constituency: Saligao

Personal details
- Born: Kedar Jayprakash Naik; 9 November 1978 (age 47) Goa, India
- Party: Bhartiya Janta Party (2022–present)
- Other political affiliations: Indian National Congress (till 2022)
- Spouse: Elita Braganza
- Education: Madurai Kamaraj University (B.Com)
- Occupation: Politician; businessman
- Website: facebook.com/kedarnaikofficial

Kedar Jayprakash Naik (born 9 November 1978) is an Indian politician and businessman who serves as a member of the Goa Legislative Assembly, representing the Saligao Assembly constituency. He won the seat after contesting from Indian National Congress ticket in 2022 Goa Legislative Assembly election. Naik defeated former Bharatiya Janata Party MLA Jayesh Salgaonkar by a margin of 1899 votes. He joined the Bharatiya Janata Party (BJP) in 2022.

== Early and personal life ==
Kedar Jayprakash Naik was born on 9 November 1978 in Goa, India, to Jayprakash Suryakant Naik. He completed his graduation in Bachelor of Commerce at Madurai Kamaraj University in 2006. He is married to Elita Casilda Perpetual Braganza, a physiotherapist.

Naik's father, Jayprakash Naik, was a journalist and the Sub-Editor of Navprabha.

== Political career ==
Naik was a sarpanch of Reis Magos panchayat before winning the Saligao Assembly constituency in 2022.
