= Dilip Parulekar =

Indian politician

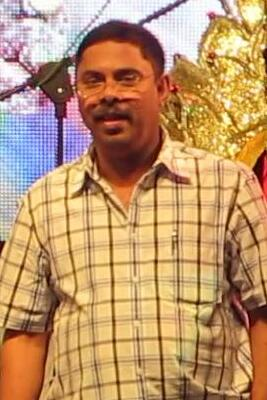
- Parulekar in 2013

Minister of Tourism Women & Child Development Ports Protocol in the Goa Government
- In office 2012–2017

Member of the Goa Legislative Assembly
- In office 2007–2012

Personal details
- Party: Bharatiya Janata Party
- Occupation: Politician

Dilip Parulekar is an Indian politician. He is a two term member of the Goa Legislative Assembly representing the Saligao constituency. Parulekar was a Minister in the Laxmikant Parsekar led government in Goa and his portfolios included Women & Child Development, Tourism, Ports and Protocol.

== Controversy ==
Opposition alleged that he was involved in a Serula Land Grab Case and having fake educational qualification. The minister is allegedly involved in the Multi crore Beach Cleaning Scam which Dilip had claimed was causing illegalities in the tourism sector. The case is currently being investigated by the Goa Lokayukta.
