= Rajesh Faldessai =

Indian politician (born 1976)

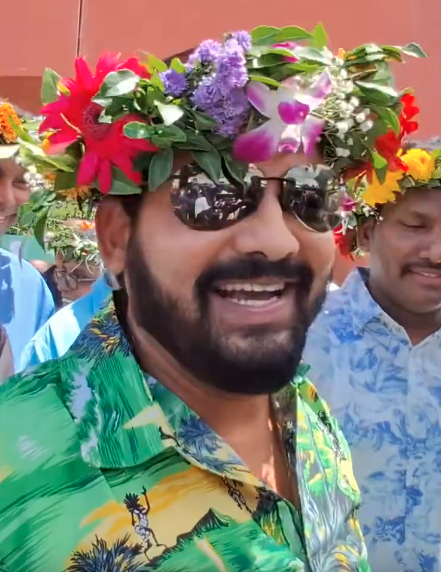
- Faldessai in 2024

Member of Goa Legislative Assembly
- Incumbent
- Assumed office 10 March 2022
- Preceded by: Pandurang Madkaikar
- Constituency: Cumbarjua

Personal details
- Born: 18 September 1976 (age 50) Goa, India
- Party: Bhartiya Janta Party (2022–present)
- Other political affiliations: Indian National Congress (2021–2022)
- Spouse: Rima Faldessai
- Education: Higher Secondary School Certificate (2014)
- Occupation: Politician; merchant; social activist
- Website: facebook.com/faldessairajesh

Rajesh Faldessai (born 18 September 1976), is an Indian politician, merchant, and social activist who serves as a member of the Goa Legislative Assembly representing the Cumbarjua Assembly constituency. Faldessai successfully contested on the Indian National Congress ticket in the 2022 Goa Legislative Assembly election. He defeated Janita Pandurang Madkaikar, wife of politician, Pandurang Madkaikar of the Bharatiya Janata Party by a margin of 2827 votes. He joined the Bharatiya Janata Party soon after in September 2022.

== Early and personal life ==
Rajesh Faldessai was born on 18 September 1976 in Goa, India to Kushali Faldessai. He completed his Higher Secondary School Certificate in Arts from Council of Open Schooling, Haryana in 2014. Faldessai is married to Rima Rajesh Faldessai, director of two companies. As of 2022, he resides in Quepem, Goa.
