= Saligao Assembly constituency =

Legislative Assembly constituency in Goa State, India

Coordinates: 15.54°N 73.78°E

Saligao
- Constituency No. 7 for the Goa Legislative Assembly

Constituency details
- Country: India
- Region: Western India
- State: Goa
- District: North Goa
- Lok Sabha constituency: North Goa
- Established: 1989
- Total electors: 27,576
- Reservation: None

Member of Legislative Assembly
- 8th Goa Legislative Assembly
- Incumbent Kedar Naik
- Party: Bharatiya Janata Party

The Saligao Assembly constituency is one of the 40 Goa Legislative Assembly constituencies of the state of Goa in southern India. Saligao is also one of the 20 constituencies falling under the North Goa Lok Sabha constituency. It is part of the North Goa district.

== Members of the Legislative Assembly ==
Year	Member	Party
1989	Wilfred de Souza	Indian National Congress
1994	Wilfred de Souza	Indian National Congress
1999	Wilfred de Souza	Goa Rajiv Congress Party
2002	Wilfred de Souza	Nationalist Congress Party
2007	Dilip Parulekar	Bharatiya Janata Party
2012	Dilip Parulekar	Bharatiya Janata Party
2017	Jayesh Salgaonkar	Goa Forward Party
2022	Kedar Naik (Note: Elected as Indian National Congress. Switched to BJP in Sept 2022)	Indian National Congress

== Election results ==
=== 2027 Assembly election ===
2027 Goa Legislative Assembly election: Saligao
Party	Candidate	Votes	%	±%
INC				
NDA				
NOTA	None of the above			
Majority				
Turnout				
gain from		Swing		

=== Assembly Election 2022 ===
2022 Goa Legislative Assembly election : Saligao
Party	Candidate	Votes	%	±%
INC	Kedar Naik	10,045	44.97%	▲37.29
BJP	Jayesh Salgaonkar	8,146	36.47%	▲0.34
RGP	Rohan Kalangutkar	1,928	8.63%	New
AAP	Mario Venancio Cordeiro	847	3.79%	▼2.53
Independent	Rupesh Damodar Naik	805	3.60%	New
AITC	Bholanath Ghadi Sakhalkar	352	1.58%	New
NOTA	None of the Above	212	0.95%	▲0.14
Margin of victory		1,899	8.50%	▼1.66
Turnout		22,335	81.04%	▲0.28
Registered electors		27,560		▲5.85
INC gain from GFP		Swing	▼1.32	

=== Assembly Election 2017 ===
2017 Goa Legislative Assembly election : Saligao
Party	Candidate	Votes	%	±%
GFP	Jayesh Salgaonkar	9,735	46.30%	New
BJP	Dilip Parulekar	7,598	36.13%	▼15.73
INC	Agnelo Nicholas Fernandes	1,616	7.68%	New
AAP	Dattatraya Vittal Padgaonkar	1,330	6.32%	New
SS	Rajesh Dabholkar	428	2.04%	New
NOTA	None of the Above	171	0.81%	New
CPI	Gajanan Rama Naik	150	0.71%	▼0.14
Margin of victory		2,137	10.16%	▼19.71
Turnout		21,028	80.77%	▼0.99
Registered electors		26,036		▲9.48
GFP gain from BJP		Swing	▼5.57	

=== Assembly Election 2012 ===
2012 Goa Legislative Assembly election : Saligao
Party	Candidate	Votes	%	±%
BJP	Dilip Parulekar	10,084	51.86%	▲8.78
Independent	D'Souza Tulio	4,276	21.99%	New
NCP	Suresh V. Parulekar	1,729	8.89%	▼21.49
Independent	Francisco Colaco	1,192	6.13%	New
Independent	Paul Fernandes	1,135	5.84%	New
Independent	Trajano D'Mello	625	3.21%	New
CPI	Gajanan Rama Naik	166	0.85%	New
Margin of victory		5,808	29.87%	▲17.17
Turnout		19,443	81.61%	▲11.79
Registered electors		23,782		▲7.97
BJP hold		Swing	▲8.78	

=== Assembly Election 2007 ===
2007 Goa Legislative Assembly election : Saligao
Party	Candidate	Votes	%	±%
BJP	Dilip Parulekar	6,639	43.08%	▲19.71
NCP	Wilfred de Souza	4,682	30.38%	▲1.72
Independent	Dmello Trajano	2,290	14.86%	New
Save Goa Front	Sayed Salim	1,601	10.39%	New
MGP	Tulsakar Anand	117	0.76%	▼10.55
Margin of victory		1,957	12.70%	▲7.82
Turnout		15,411	69.95%	▼0.68
Registered electors		22,026		▲4.63
BJP gain from NCP		Swing	▲14.42	

=== Assembly Election 2002 ===
2002 Goa Legislative Assembly election : Saligao
Party	Candidate	Votes	%	±%
NCP	Wilfred de Souza	4,263	28.66%	New
INC	D' Mello Trejano Agricio	3,537	23.78%	▲8.21
BJP	Harmalkar Sadguru Pandurang	3,476	23.37%	▲12.01
MGP	Sayyad Salim Pirsab	1,682	11.31%	▼21.30
Independent	Kalangutkar Deelip Sonu	1,677	11.28%	New
Independent	Sequeira Savio Victor	122	0.82%	New
Independent	Roland A. D'Souza	102	0.69%	New
Margin of victory		726	4.88%	▲1.55
Turnout		14,873	70.59%	▲2.97
Registered electors		21,051		▲2.29
NCP gain from Goa Rajiv Congress Party		Swing	▼7.28	

=== Assembly Election 1999 ===
1999 Goa Legislative Assembly election : Saligao
Party	Candidate	Votes	%	±%
Goa Rajiv Congress Party	Wilfred de Souza	5,006	35.94%	New
MGP	Kalangutkar Deelip Sonu	4,542	32.61%	New
INC	Malik Shrikant Keshav	2,169	15.57%	▼29.38
BJP	Mandrekar Gorakh Rajaram	1,583	11.36%	New
UGDP	Navelkar Amol Prabhakar	268	1.92%	New
Independent	Pednekar Rama Dattaram	266	1.91%	New
SS	Gurav Baburao Vithal	93	0.67%	New
Margin of victory		464	3.33%	▼5.65
Turnout		13,929	67.67%	▼8.61
Registered electors		20,580		▲8.92
Goa Rajiv Congress Party gain from INC		Swing	▼9.01	

=== Assembly Election 1994 ===
1994 Goa Legislative Assembly election : Saligao
Party	Candidate	Votes	%	±%
INC	Wilfred de Souza	6,479	44.95%	▼4.97
SS	Kalangutkar Dilip Sonu	5,184	35.97%	New
Independent	Malik Shrikant Keshav	2,369	16.44%	New
Independent	Rodrigues Avelino Tresicas	96	0.67%	New
Margin of victory		1,295	8.98%	▲5.56
Turnout		14,414	75.36%	▼1.19
Registered electors		18,894		▲17.30
INC hold		Swing	▼4.97	

=== Assembly Election 1989 ===
1989 Goa Legislative Assembly election : Saligao
Party	Candidate	Votes	%	±%
INC	Wilfred de Souza	6,229	49.92%	New
MGP	Ahrenkar Punaji Pandurang	5,802	46.49%	New
Gomantak Lok Pox	Yves Zuzarte	169	1.35%	New
Margin of victory		427	3.42%	
Turnout		12,479	75.86%	
Registered electors		16,107		
INC win (new seat)				

== See also ==
- List of constituencies of the Goa Legislative Assembly
- North Goa district
