= Sudin Dhavalikar =

Indian politician (born 1956)

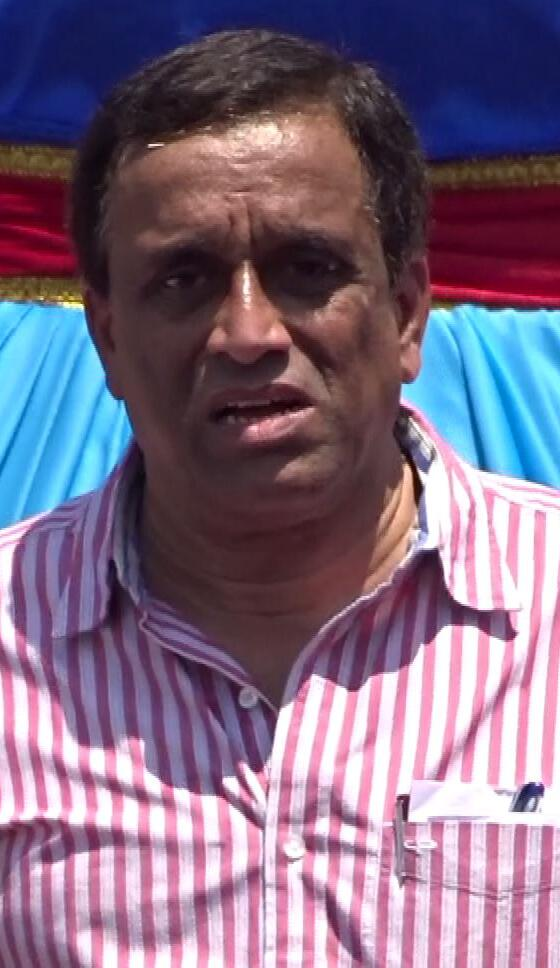
- Dhavalikar in 2018

Member of the Goa Legislative Assembly
- Incumbent
- Assumed office 8 June 1999
- Preceded by: Shripad Naik
- Constituency: Marcaim

7th Deputy Chief Minister of Goa
- In office 19 March 2019 – 27 March 2019 Serving with Vijai Sardesai
- Governor: Mridula Sinha
- Chief Minister: Pramod Sawant
- Preceded by: Francis D'Souza
- Succeeded by: Manohar Ajgaonkar

Cabinet Minister, Government of Goa
- In office 17 March 2017 – 17 March 2019
- Governor: Mridula Sinha
- Chief Minister: Manohar Parrikar
- Ministry and Departments: Public Works.; Transport.; River Navigation.; Museum.

Cabinet Minister to the Government of Goa
- Incumbent
- Assumed office April 2022
- Governor: P. S. Sreedharan Pillai
- Chief Minister: Pramod Sawant
- Ministry and Departments: Power; New and Renewable Energy; Housing

Personal details
- Born: 21 November 1956 (age 69) Ponda, Goa, Portuguese India
- Party: Maharashtrawadi Gomantak Party (since 1990s)
- Spouse: Jyoti Dhavalikar
- Relatives: Deepak Dhavalikar (brother)
- Education: Chowgule College, then under Bombay University
- Occupation: Politician

Ramkrishna alias Sudin Madhav Dhavalikar (born 21 November 1956) is an Indian politician and a senior leader of the Maharashtrawadi Gomantak Party (MGP). He is a six-term member of the Goa Legislative Assembly, representing the Marcaim constituency since 1999. Dhavalikar also served as the seventh co-Deputy Chief Minister of Goa for eight days, from 19 to 27 March 2019, alongside Vijai Sardesai.

== Ministry portfolios ==
He has been a Minister in various governments for over 15 years, holding important portfolios by forming alliances with various political parties.

Goa State Cabinet Ministry Portfolios held by Sudin Dhavalikar
Took office	Left office	Portfolios Held	Chief Minister	Party
3 June 2002	31 January 2005	P.W.D., Archives & Archaeology, Museum, and Fisheries	Manohar Parrikar	BJP
3 February 2005	4 March 2005	Public Works Department, Fisheries, Archives & Archaeology, and Museum	Manohar Parrikar	BJP
7 June 2005	5 June 2007	Public Works Department, Fisheries, Archives & Archaeology, Museum, and Co-operation	Shri Pratapsingh Rane	INC
8 June 2007	28 July 2007	Public Works Department, and Science & Technology	Shri Pratapsingh Rane	INC
14 March 2008	1 February 2012	Transport, River Navigation Department, and Social Welfare	Digambar Kamat	INC
9 March 2012	8 November 2014	Public Works Department, Transport, and River Navigation	Manohar Parrikar	BJP
8 November 2014	12 December 2016	Public Works Department, Transport, and River Navigation	Laxmikant Parsekar	BJP
20 March 2017	17 March 2019	Public Works Department, Transport, River Navigation, and Museum	Manohar Parrikar	BJP
18 March 2019	27 March 2019	Public Works Department, Transport, River Navigation, and Museum	Pramod Sawant	BJP
9 April 2022	Present	Power, New & Renewable Energy, and Housing	Pramod Sawant	BJP

On 27 March 2019, he was dropped from the Cabinet of Ministers as the Deputy Chief Minister, as well as the ruling alliance, after two MGP MLAs (Deepak Pauskar and Manohar Ajgaonkar) broke away from the party and joined the ruling BJP, merging the MGP legislative party into the BJP. A disqualification plea of the two breakaway MGP MLAs, along with 10 other congress MLAs was dismissed by the High Court of Bombay at Goa.

== Career ==
Dhavalikar is a senior leader of the Maharashtrawadi Gomantak Party, Goa's first ruling party after the end of Portuguese rule in 1961. He first joined the party in the early 1990s. He has played a pivotal role in survival and success of the party for last 20 years.

== Controversy ==
In 2015, two members of Aam Aadmi Party – Pradip Ghadi Amonkar and Mujahid Rizvi – alleged that Dhavalikar, while contesting the previous Assembly election, had sworn a false affidavit that he is a BSc graduate. They claimed that Sudin Dhavalikar had lied in his sworn affidavit regarding his educational qualification. The aggrieved approached the court as they claimed that Ponda police had declined to register an FIR against Dhavalikar. After inquiring with the Bombay University, Ponda police submitted in the court that Dhavalikar's BSc degree is genuine. The Ponda court promptly dismissed the case noting that JMFC Apurva Nagvekar did not find any merit in the application made by the aggrieved party.
