= Goa Forward Party =

Political party in India

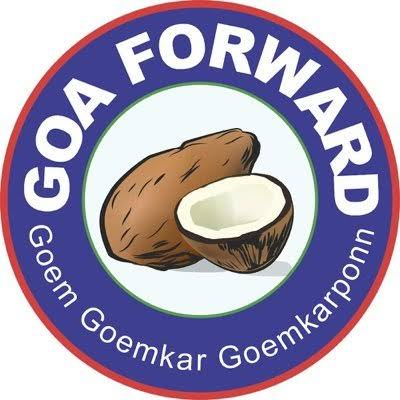
- Abbreviation: GFP
- Leader: Vijai Sardesai
- President: Vijai Sardesai
- Founder: Chaitanya Bhaje
- Founded: 25 January 2016; 10 years ago
- Ideology: Regionalism
- ECI status: State Party (Goa)
- Alliance: UPA (2021–23); NDA (2017–2019); INDIA (2023–2026)
- Seats in Goa Legislative Assembly: 1 / 40

Election symbol

Website
- goaforward.in

Goa Forward Party (GFP) is a regional political party in the western coastal Indian state of Goa, led by Vijai Sardesai. The GFP fielded four candidates in the 2017 Goa Assembly election and won three seats. It played a crucial, if controversial, role in the return of the Bharatiya Janata Party to power in the March 2017 election results in Goa. The party's motto is "Goem, Goemkar, Goemkarponn" (Goa, Goans and Goan ethos). The party was launched on 25 January 2016 and its symbol is the coconut.

== History ==
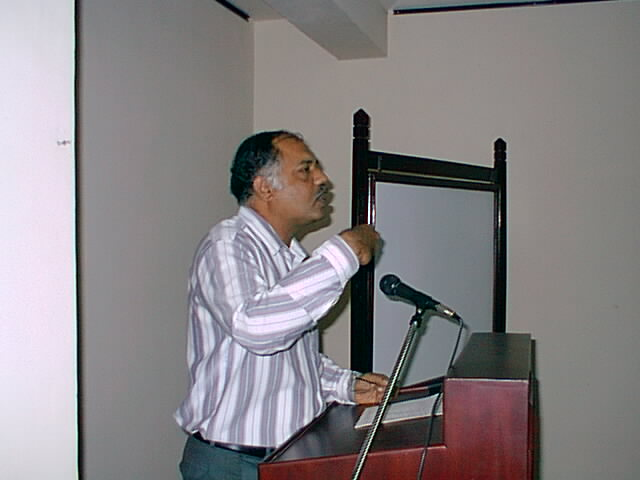
Former party president Prabhakar Timble in 1998

The Goa Forward Party was launched on 25 January 2016 with Prabhakar Timble as its president, Dr. Renuka Da Silva as the Vice President and Mohandas Lolienkar as the state secretary of the party under the guidance of then Independent MLA Vijai Sardesai. The party was launched as an alternative to the national political parties and inclusive development while retaining Goemkarponn (Goan ethos). In a press conference held to announce the launching of the party, then President Prabhakar Timble had stated that the party would be ready to ally with any other political parties except the Bharatiya Janata Party (BJP). In the initial days of its formation, the Goa Forward Party was a vocal critic of the BJP and its campaign for the 2017 Goa Legislative Assembly election was majorly based on the anti-BJP plank. To oust the BJP from power was among the party's main priorities when it was launched.

The first protest by the party along with other opposition parties was held on 27 January 2016 opposing cutting down of coconut trees to make way for the red category beer factory by Vani Agro Farms Private Ltd. at Amdai in Sanguem. The party later organised a protest march in the form of a Maad Yatra (Coconut tree march) to protest against the Goa Preservation of Trees (Amendment) Act, 2016 which was passed by the Goa Legislative Assembly.

In April 2021, the GFP left the BJP led NDA. President Vijai Sardesai cited multiple reasons for leaving the alliance and "alleged that BJP’s only mission in Goa is transportation of coal and handing it over to private company".

== Political leadership ==
The Goa Forward Party during its launch contained no popular politicians but since its inception, the party referred to the three independent MLAs Vijai Sardesai, Rohan Khaunte and Naresh Sawal as 'mentors'. The three MLAs initially backed the party while Sardesai and Khaunte participated in the protests organised by the party too.

Many members of the Bharatiya Janata Party and the Indian National Congress gradually joined the party. While cricketer Shadab Jakati formally joined the party, cardiologist like Dr. Francisco Colaco campaigned for the party.

Subsequently, Naresh Sawal disassociated himself from the party, joining the M. G. Party and unsuccessfully contesting the 2017 Assembly elections from the Bicholim constituency as a M. G. Party candidate. Rohan Khaunte successfully contested the 2017 Assembly elections as an independent candidate from the Porvorim constituency. He was supported by the Indian National Congress.

Vijai Sardesai joined the party on 16 January 2017 and successfully contested the 2017 Assembly elections from the Fatorda constituency as the party's candidate.

== 2017 Assembly elections ==
The Goa Forward Party initially expressed the need of an alliance to counter the Bharatiya Janata Party but all efforts to forge an alliance between the party and the Indian National Congress failed. Vijai Sardesai blamed the Goa Pradesh Congress Committee's President Luizinho Faleiro for the failure to form an alliance. The party declared its support to the independent candidate Edwin alias Cipru Souza who unsuccessfully contested the 2017 Assembly elections from the Navelim constituency against Luizinho Faleiro. The Indian National Congress accused that the Goa Forward Party was funded by the Bharatiya Janata Party.

=== Manifesto and agenda in 2017 elections ===
In the run-up to the 2017 elections, Goa Forward said its "vision" was a "developed Goa, happy Goans". It also spelt out what is said was its mission ("empowered Goans"), motto ("Our Goa, Our Centre, Our Culture") and objective (to "protect [the] Goan identity").

It listed its promises as:

- Setting up of an Employment Promotion Board.
- 80% jobs to local youth.
- Abolish the Madhya Pradesh Sound Pollution Act and legislate "our" (i.e. one of Goa's) own.
- Affordable pricing of fish, rice, coconut and pão (local bread).
- Zero-tolerance to the drug trade.
- Free WiFi across Goa.
- To legislate new laws to fulfil the dream of special status for Goa.
- To build Goan partnership in the tourism and mining sectors.
- "Denationalisation" of Goan rivers.

Being a new local party, contesting elections for the first time, the Goa Forward also came up with local, constituency-wise "priorities" of its contestants. For example, in Saligao assembly constituency, its candidate Jayesh Salgaonkar had a list of some 25 one-line "top priorities" ranging from traffic congestion at Verem, employment for local youth in government enterprise and tourism, promoting rural employment for the SC/ST/OBC communities, taking the benefits of government schemes to the local underprivileged, guaranteeing assistance to those whose lands are acquired by the government (through employment, market price and support to their occupation), connecting internal areas of Saligao by public transport, etc.

Other promises made to this constituency include connecting every home to an effective sewerage network; door-to-door garbage collection and making Saligao garbage and plastic free; beautifying open spaces in the constituency; encouraging sports including traditional games and yoga; setting up special day centres for senior citizens; tackling the street-dog "menace" through NGO intervention by scientific methods; a morgue and hearse van facility in the constituency; green hubs with support from the Horticulture Corporation; hawker zones for "inclusive development"; showcasing heritage spaces and houses; a 24x7 helpline for Saligao residents in distress; office with staff to settle citizen grievances; dedicated fish and veg markets in all villages; community halls at "select locations"; gardens and children's parks in all villages with joggers' parks at select locations; development of Coco and Quegdevelim beaches (Nerul); football grounds at Reis Magos, Saligao and Guirim; upgradation of grounds at Sangolda, Pilerne and Nerul; and facilitating water harvesting.

The party's 24-point programme promised free water to each household, free power for agriculture, free WiFi access, affordable housing, day-care centres for seniors and children, and fish-coconut-bread at affordable prices. Goa Forward promised to bring the coconut under the Goa Preservation of Trees Act and pledged to declare the coconut as the State Tree. Its party symbol has been the coconut, over which there was a major controversy in Goa in recent years with the BJP government making the important local tree easier to be felled under the law.

Goa Forward contested only four of the total forty seats of the Goa Legislative Assembly. The party's President Prabhakar Timble stated that the party had contested in only four constituencies in order to prevent division of the non-Bharatiya Janata Party votes. The party contested in the Fatorda, Velim, Saligao and Siolim constituencies. The party emerged victorious in all three constituencies except Velim. While Jayesh Salgaonkar in Saligao and Vinoda Paliencar in Siolim defeated the Bharatiya Janata Party's political heavyweights Dilip Parulekar and Dayanand Mandrekar respectively, Vijai Sardesai retained his Fatorda seat.

=== Government formation ===
The results of the 2017 Goa Assembly election gave rise to a hung assembly since no political party could achieve a complete majority of 21 in the 40 member Goa Legislative Assembly. The Indian National Congress emerged the single largest party with 17 seats but ultimately, the Bharatiya Janata Party which emerged victorious in 13 constituencies formed the government with the support of the Goa Forward Party, Maharashtrawadi Gomantak Party and independents. The Goa Forward Party expressed its support to the Bharatiya Janata Party on the condition that the then Union Defence Minister of India Manohar Parrikar would return to Goa as the Chief Minister of Goa.

Party's supremo Vijai Sardesai justified his decision by stating that the Indian National Congress party as well as the Goa Pradesh Congress Committee President Luizinho Faleiro had ditched him before. He stated that the BJP in Goa was different from that of the national BJP and that the government would work according to a common minimum programme. Vijai Sardesai claimed that he would act as a watchdog of Geomkarponn (Goanness) in the government and that he had supported the BJP-led government for stability and development.

The Goa Forward Party President Prabhakar Timble resigned as the President and subsequently as the primary member of the party after Sardesai and the other two party MLAs accorded their support towards formation of the BJP-led government in Goa. The party and its supremo Vijai Sardesai were heavily criticised for joining the government led by Manohar Parrikar. At a largely attended protest meet on 18 March 2017 at Margao's Lohia Maidan, Sardesai was condemned by many for supporting the Bharatiya Janata Party government led by Manohar Parrikar.

On 14 March 2017, the government led by Manohar Parrikar was sworn in. All three MLAs of the party was included in the cabinet. Vijai Sardesai was given the portfolios of Town & Country Planning and Agriculture. Jayesh Salgaonkar was allotted the portfolios of Housing and Rural Development Agency, while Vinoda Paliencar was allotted the Water Resources Department and Fisheries portfolios.

Post government formation, some office bearers of the Goa Forward Party were also nominated to head some government corporations and institutions. Then party-president Dr. Renuka da Silva was appointed as the Chairperson of the South Goa Planning and Development Authority. The party's Chief Spokesperson Prashant Naik was appointed the Chairman of the Ravindra Bhavan at Fatorda. Party's Senior Vice President Monica Dias was appointed the Chairperson of the Goa Khadi and Village Industries Board, but she could not complete her term as she died on 31 July 2017. The Town and Country Planning Board was reconstituted to be headed by Vijai Sardesai and Goa Forward's Treasurer Suraj Lotlikar was appointed as a member of the Board.

== 2022 Assembly Elections ==
In the 2022 Goa Vidhansabha Elections, GFP won one seat.

== Party leadership ==
After Prabhakar Timble's resignation as the President of the party and from the primary membership as well, Vice President Dr. Renuka da Silva was appointed as the President of the party. Subsequently, Dr. Renuka da Silva was appointed as the Chairperson of the South Goa Planning and Development Authority. Former Congress Organisation Secretary Shri.Durgadas Kamat joined Goa Forward Party on 31 May 2016 and was appointed as the Vice President and Spokesperson of the Party. Currently, he is the General Secretary (Org) of the Party.

On 12 July 2017, she was relieved from the position of the President as per her request. Vijai Sardesai took over as the new President of the Party. Jayesh Salgaonkar was appointed as the in-charge of the party's youth wing, Vinoda Paliencar was made in-charge of the OBC wing. Shri Raj Malik was appointed as the Youth President and Adv Ashma Sayed was appointed as Women Forward President

== See also ==
- List of political parties in India
