= Babu Ajgaonkar =

Indian politician

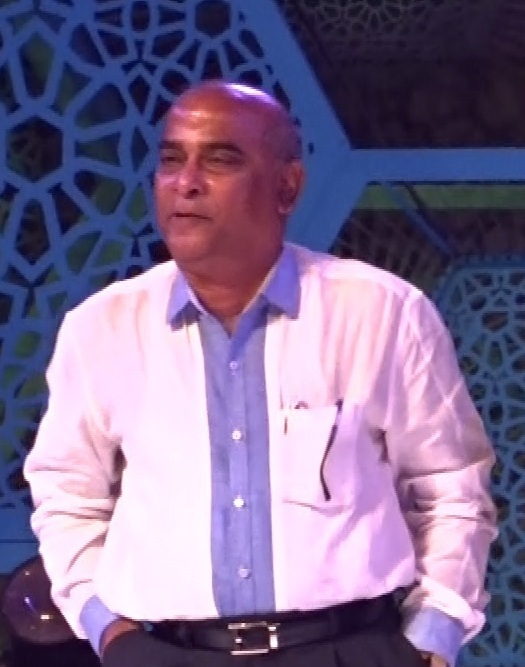
- Ajgaonkar in 2017

8th Deputy Chief Minister of Goa
- In office 28 March 2019 – 10 March 2022 Serving with Babu Kavlekar
- Portfolio: Minister for Tourism, Sports and Printing and Stationery
- Preceded by: Sudin Dhavalikar
- Succeeded by: Vacant

Personal details
- Born: Manohar Trimbak Ajgaonkar; 6 November 1954 (age 71) Margão, Goa, Portuguese India
- Party: Bharatiya Janata Party
- Other political affiliations: Maharashtrawadi Gomantak Party; Indian National Congress
- Education: 10th Pass
- Profession: Business

Manohar Trimbak "Babu" Ajgaonkar (born 6 November 1954) is an Indian politician and member of the Bharatiya Janata Party. Ajgaonkar is a first term member of the Goa Legislative Assembly in 2007 from the Dhargalim constituency in Pernem.

He started his career with Indian National Congress. He joined Bharatiya Janata Party in 2002 and won the seat. He returned to Indian National Congress in 2007 and retained the seat. He joined Maharashtrawadi Gomantak Party in 2017. He also declared his candidature from Pernem constituency in North Goa.

Ajgaonkar and Pauskar joined the Bharatiya Janata Party in March 2019 thus minimizing Maharashtrawadi Gomantak Party to one seat in the Goa Legislative Assembly. Ajgaonkar was appointed Deputy Chief Minister of Goa.
