= Jayesh Salgaonkar =

Indian politician

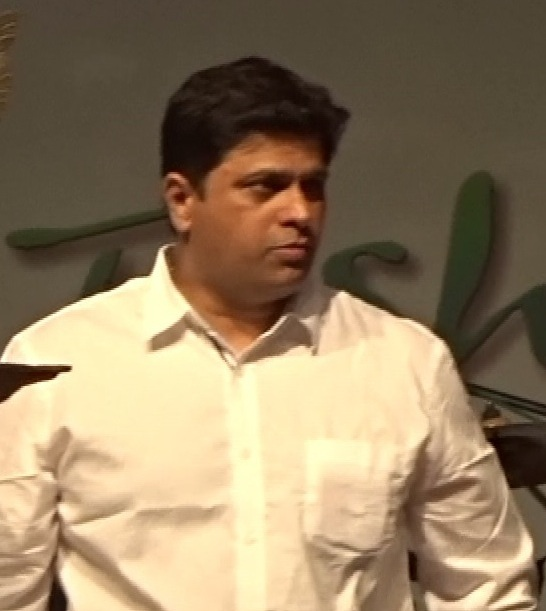
Jayesh Salgaonkar in 2017

Jayesh Vidyadhar Salgaonkar is an Indian politician who served as a member of the Goa Legislative Assembly from the Saligao constituency from 2017 to 2022. He was the Minister of Ports, Rural Development Agency and Housing with Housing Board department in Manohar Parrikar ministry. Salgaonkar was dropped from Pramod Sawant’s council of ministers after 10 Congress lawmakers joined the BJP in July 2019 and the BJP didn’t need Goa Forward's support.

In April 2021, Goa Forward left the NDA. By December 2021, rumors began circulating that Salgaonkar would be quitting Goa Forward to join the BJP. Stating that he has not acted to quell the rumours, GFP sent a show-cause notice to Salgaonkar. In response, Salgaonkar quit the Goa Forward Party and was inducted into the BJP. His entry into the BJP was met with strong opposition from a section of the BJP cadre.
