= Vijai Sardesai =

Indian politician (born 1970)

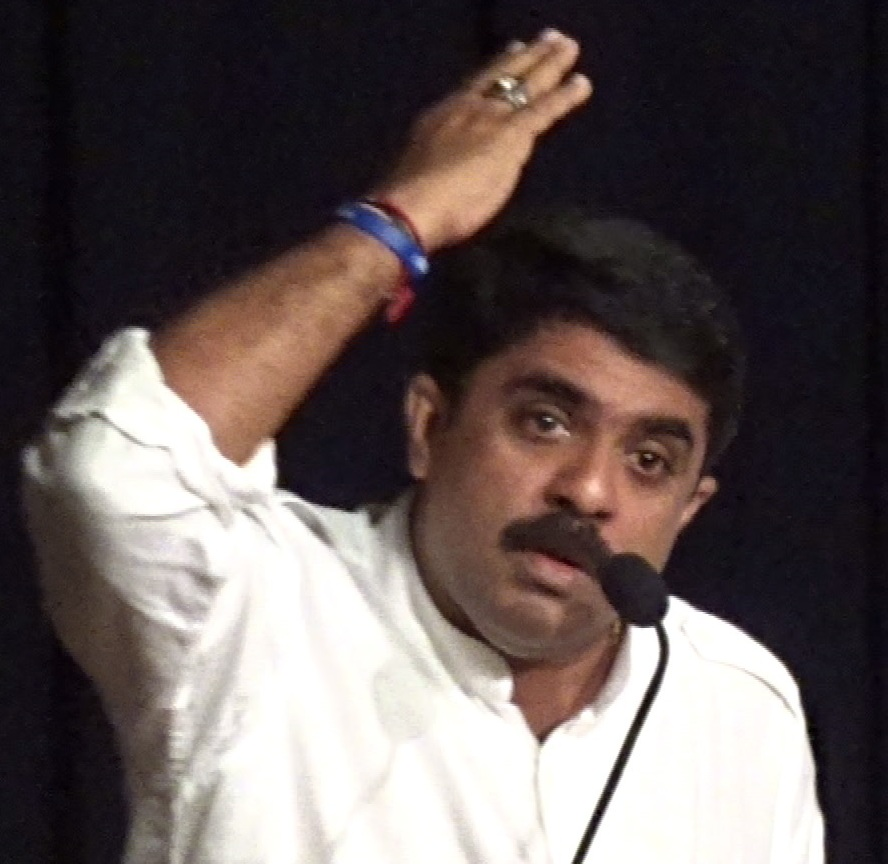
- Sardesai in 2016

7th Deputy Chief Minister of Goa
- In office 19 March 2019 – 13 July 2019
- Governor: Mridula Sinha
- Chief Minister: Pramod Sawant
- Preceded by: Francis D'Souza

Minister of Agriculture Government of Goa
- In office 14 March 2017 – 13 July 2019
- Chief Minister: Manohar Parrikar
- Preceded by: Ramesh Tawadkar

Minister of Archives & Archeology Government of Goa
- In office 14 March 2017 – 13 July 2019
- Chief Minister: Manohar Parrikar
- Preceded by: Dayanand Mandrekar

Minister of Factories & Boilers Government of Goa
- In office 6 September 2017 – 13 July 2019
- Chief Minister: Manohar Parrikar
- Preceded by: Deepak Dhavalikar

Member of Legislative Assembly
- Incumbent
- Assumed office 16 March 2017
- Constituency: Fatorda
- In office 7 March 2012 – 16 January 2017
- Preceded by: Damu Naik
- Constituency: Fatorda

Personal details
- Born: 14 November 1970 (age 55) Buenos Aires, Argentina
- Party: Goa Forward Party (since 2016)
- Other political affiliations: Indian National Congress (until 2012); Independent (2012–2016)
- Spouse: Usha Sardesai
- Children: 1
- Relatives: Madhavi Sardesai (sister); Ravindra Kelekar (uncle); Subodh Kerkar (brother-in-law)
- Education: Dr. Balasaheb Sawant Konkan Krishi Vidyapeeth (BSc)
- Occupation: Politician
- Profession: Real Estate Business

Vijai Jaivant Sardesai (born 14 June 1970) is an Indian politician and businessman who serves as a member of the Goa Legislative Assembly representing the Fatorda constituency and belongs to the Goa Forward Party. He also served as seventh Deputy Chief Minister of Goa from March to July 2019.

== Early and personal life ==
Vijai Jaivant Sardesai was born on 14 June 1970 in Buenos Aires, Argentina to Jaivant and Laxmibai Sardesai (née Mogabai). His father Jaivant was an entomologist who served with the United Nations. His sisters are Savita Kerkar (married to Subodh Kerkar) and academic Madhavi Sardesai. Ravindra Kelekar is his uncle.

Sardesai completed a Bachelor of Science degree in agriculture from the Dr. Balasaheb Sawant Konkan Krishi Vidyapeeth in 1992 and is a real estate dealer by profession.

Vijai married Usha Sardesai and they have a daughter named Urvi.

Sardesai is the President of the Progressive Goa Wrestling Association and also of the Goa Dodgeball Association. Sardesai has pledged to donate his eyes post his death.

== Political career ==
Vijai started his political career in the student politics of Goa. He was the Chairman of the Goa University Students Council. Sardesai started his political career in the Indian National Congress and he was the President of Goa Pradesh Youth Congress. Sardesai was co-opted as a councillor of the Margao Municipal Council.

=== Independent MLA ===
Sardesai was denied the Indian National Congress candidature from the Fatorda constituency during the 2012 Goa Legislative Assembly election. Sardesai quit the Indian National Congress as an independent candidate and emerged victorious.

During his debut as an independent MLA, Sardesai emerged as a fierce opposition figure. His performance on the floor of the Goa Legislative Assembly and outside the Assembly too made Sardesai popular. Vijai Sardesai ensured the victory of his panel in the Margao Municipal Council elections in 2015. Sardesai was accused by his opponents of being involved in the Louis Berger bribery scam but the allegations remain unproven.

=== Goa Forward Party ===
On 25 January 2016, the Goa Forward Party was launched. Although Sardesai was a mentor of the party, he did not officially join it because of the Anti-Defection Law. Sardesai joined the party on 16 January 2017 and contested the 2017 Goa Legislative Assembly election as a candidate of the Goa Forward Party. The party contested in only four constituencies in the 2017 Assembly elections and emerged victorious in three.

== Minister in the Manohar Parrikar-led government ==
No single party obtained the requisite majority of 21 seats in the 2017 elections but the Indian National Congress emerged as the largest party with 17 seats. Sardesai and the two other Goa Forward Party legislators supported the Bharatiya Janata Party (BJP) which secured 13 seats, on the condition that Manohar Parrikar would be appointed the Chief Minister of Goa. Sardesai, whose whole campaign was based on the anti-BJP premise, was criticised by many including his supporters for this act. The Goa Forward Party President Prabhakar Timble resigned after Sardesai and the other two party MLAs accorded their support towards formation of the BJP-led government in Goa.

Sardesai justified his decision by stating that the Indian National Congress party as well as the Goa Pradesh Congress Committee President Luizinho Faleiro had ditched him before. He stated that the BJP in Goa was different from that of the national BJP and that the government would work according to a common minimum programme. Sardesai claimed that he would act as a watchdog of Geomkarponn (Goanness) in the government and that he had supported the BJP-led government for stability and development.

Vijai Sardesai was sworn in as a cabinet Minister in the Government of Goa headed by Manohar Parrikar on 14 March 2017. The other two Goa Forward Party legislators, Vinoda Paliencar and Jayesh Salgaonkar were also sworn in as cabinet Ministers.

At a largely attended protest meet on 18 March 2017 at Margao's Lohia Maidan, Sardesai was condemned by many for supporting the Bharatiya Janata Party government led by Manohar Parrikar.
