= Maharashtrawadi Gomantak Party =

Political party in India

- Abbreviation: MGP or MAG
- Leader: Sudin Dhavalikar
- Chairperson: Deepak Dhavalikar
- Secretary: Pratap Fadte
- Founder: Dayanand Bandodkar
- Founded: 1963
- Headquarters: 18th June Road, Panaji- 403001 Goa
- Ideology: Populism; Regionalism
- Political position: Centre-right
- ECI Status: State Party
- Alliance: NDA (2012–2019), (2022–present); AITC+ (2021–2022)
- Seats in Goa Legislative Assembly: 2 / 40
- Number of states and union territories in government: 1 / 31

Election symbol

Maharashtrawadi Gomantak Party (abbr. MGP) is a political party in India. It was Goa's first ruling party after the end of Portuguese rule in Goa in 1961.

The party has its base amongst non-Brahmin Hindu migrants from Maharashtra and their descendants, a group that made up a large section of the poorer residents in Goa during Portuguese rule in Goa and whose numbers increased after 1961 by mass immigration from Maharashtra at the invitation of MGP politicians. However, the MGP proposal to merge Goa with Maharashtra was met with stiff opposition from the native Goans. Indira Gandhi, the then Prime Minister of India, then offered two options:

1. To retain Goa's current status as a Union Territory
2. To merge Goa into the neighboring state of Maharashtra and the other erstwhile Portuguese enclaves of Daman and Diu into the neighbouring state of Gujarat

A law to conduct opinion poll to decide the issue of merger or otherwise of Goa, Daman and Diu with Maharashtra/Gujarat was passed by both the houses of the Indian Parliament, the Lok Sabha (on 1 December 1966), and the Rajya Sabha (on 7 December 1966) and the same received the assent of the President of India, Sarvepalli Radhakrishnan on 16 December 1966. An opinion poll was subsequently held on 16 January 1967 to decide the fate of the union territory which voted to retain its status as separate from Maharashtra by 34,021 votes.

The continued mass immigration of Marathi people from Maharashtra to Goa helped the MGP to hold on to power for much of the first two decades of post-Portuguese Goa, despite being affected by some defections, by defeating the other contenders for power — primarily the United Goans Party (not to be confused with the United Goans Democratic Party founded in the 1990s) and the Indian National Congress.

During the first 18 years after the end of Portuguese rule, the MGP led the state government. However, the MGP today is marginalized when compared to its former status. The Bharatiya Janata Party, particularly during its reign between 1999 and 2005, took over most of the Hindu voters and also a large chunk of the MGP workers. Deepak Dhavalikar is the current president of the party and Pratap Fadte is the general secretary.

== History ==
MGP's first chief minister was the mine owner Dayanand Bandodkar, followed by his daughter, Shashikala Kakodkar, who ascended to power after her father died in office, approximately a decade after taking over power, in 1973.

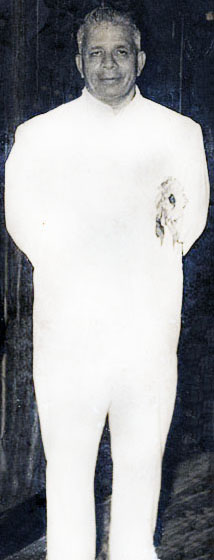
Dayanand Bandodkar, the first Chief Minister of Goa, Daman and Diu

After Shashikala Kakodkar left MGP and joined Congress, Ramakant Khalap became leader of MGP in Goa Assembly and from just two seats under his charismatic leadership MGP won 18 seats in the subsequent elections. As recorded by the Supreme Court of India in the cases Dr. Kashinath Jalmi vs State of Goa and Ravi Naik V/s State of Goa at one time MGP had clear majority of 25 MLAs in the 40-member Assembly of Goa, however by blatant misuse of his powers under the Anti Defection Law and Constitution of India, the then Governor of Goa did not make Khalap Chief Minister of Goa.

MGP's plank was largely based on populism, and promising a better deal to the Hindu economically deprived and socially oppressed sections in Goa. It was initially associated with a plank of merging Goa with the neighboring state of Maharashtra, a policy it subsequently backed away from when the 1967 Opinion Poll held in the region voted against the merger. It has also supported the use of the Marathi language; though some interpret its stand on language and merger as being partly a means of fighting caste issues and countering the domination of Goa by the traditional Hindu and Catholic elites.

The BJP allied with the MGP in the elections of 1994, and made inroads into that party's vote-base, even though it won only four seats in that election, and the MGP got 10. Over the years, the MGP, which is symbolized by a lion and has a saffron flag, has been further eroded by the ascendent BJP.

Following an election in the early 2000s, the MGP were reduced to just one seat (out of a total of 40 seats) in the Goa legislative assembly, while the BJP made large gains.

In the Lok Sabha parliamentary elections of 2004, the party had launched candidates in both constituencies in Goa. They got 5377 and 2207 votes.

== 1994–1999 ==
In the early 1990s, the BJP was steadily gaining strength in national politics and was emerging as an alternative to the Indian National Congress (INC) at the center. Hoping to end years of Congress rule in the state, the MGP entered into a pre-poll alliance with the BJP in Goa.

Considering that the MGP drew its support from the Bahujan Samaj and the BJP's demands for the demolition of the Babri Masjid, many believed that the electoral alliance would prove to be a tough competition to the ruling Congress as it would help consolidate the majority Hindu votes in its favor.

The MGP contested 25 seats whereas the BJP fielded its candidates from 12 constituencies. However, in the state elections, the Congress emerged as the single largest party, yet again, winning 18 seats. The MGP received 12 seats, whereas four BJP legislators were also elected. The candidates who won the elections on MGP ticket in 1994 were:

Constituency	Candidate	Gender
Pernem	Parshuram Kotkar	M
Dargalim (SC)	Deu Mandrekar	M
Mapusa	Surendra Sirsat	M
Siolim	Chandrakant Chodankar	M
Maem	Shashikala Kakodkar	F
Pale	Sadanand Malik	M
Ponda	Shivdas Atmaram Verekar	M
Priol	Dr. Kashinath Jalmi	M
Vasco-da-Gama	Dr. Wilfred Mesquita	F
Savordem	Vishnu Prabhu	M
Quepem	Prakash Velip	M
Poiguinim	Govind Raghuchandra Acharya	M

Following the results, the Congress formed a coalition government under the leadership of Pratapsinh Rane. However, in 1998, internal differences between the party leaders led to a split in the Congress.

Former CM Dr. Wilfred de Souza broke away with another nine MLAs to form a new political party – the Goa Rajiv Congress which grabbed power, thanks to support extended by both, the MGP as well as the BJP. The government lasted for just 120 days and the INC seized power in November 1998, just a few months before the 1999 assembly polls.

The 1994 coalition with the BJP proved to be a strategic blunder for the MGP, affecting the prospects of the party in the future. The national party soon started eating into the MGP's traditional vote bank. As the BJP improved its tally over the next few elections, the MGP's strength has declined exponentially. Many of its top leaders and ordinary cadres have either shifted to other parties or retired from active politics. Since the 1994 assembly polls, the MGP's tally has never crossed the two digit mark.

== 1999–2002 ==
In the 1999 elections to the state legislature, the MGP was reduced to a mere 4 seats. On the other hand, its former partner, the BJP increased its tally to 10. The INC won a simple majority by winning 21 seats and Luizinho Faleiro was sworn in as the Chief Minister.

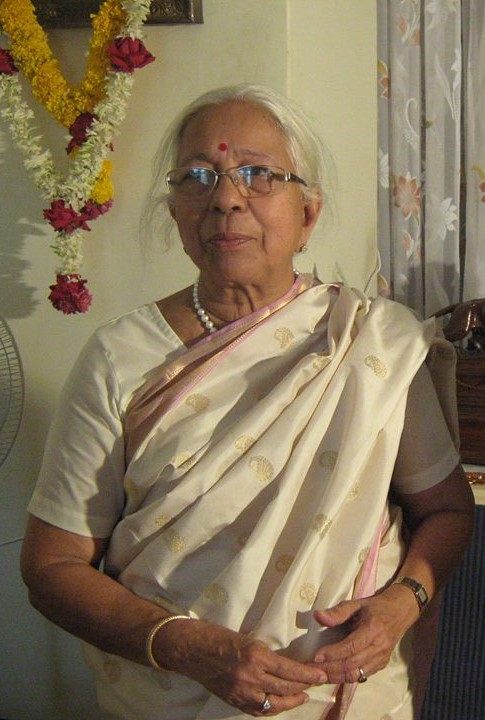
Shashikala Gurudatt Kakodkar, on her birthday in 2011

Fearing internal rebellion, the Congress invited other parties to merge with it or join the government.

A few days later, the United Goans Democratic Party merged into the ruling party increasing its strength to 23. Soon, even the MGP joined the government. The MGP legislators who won the 1999 polls are specified below:

Constituency	Candidate	Gender
Mandrem	Ramakant Dattaram Khalap	M
Bicholim	Pandurang Raut	M
Marcaim	Sudin Dhavalikar	M
Quepem	Prakash Velip	M

== Assembly Elections 2007 ==
The party improved its strength during the June 2007 state elections, in which it allied with the Indian National Congress party. The MGP got 9% of the vote and won two seats in the state assembly, a gain of one. The party entered a coalition government led by the Congress Party and also including the Nationalist Congress Party.

On 26 July 2007, its two MLAs and two Independent MLAs withdraw their support to Digambar Kamat Ministry leading to the reduction of his government into minority. However, they were later wooed back and the regime subsequently completed its full term.

== Assembly Elections 2012 ==
Prior to the elections to the state assembly in February 2012, the MGP withdrew its support to the Congress led coalition government citing the medium of instruction as one of the issues. It then entered into a pre-poll agreement with the BJP. Under this agreement, the party contested eight seats (Benaulim, Dabolim, Marcaim, Nuvem, Ponda, Priol, Quepem and Thivim) while its partner fielded its candidates in another 31 seats.

The allies supported independent candidate Nirmala Sawant from Cumbharjua. The elections were important for the party as it had to win either three seats or over 95,000 votes to retain its electoral symbol.

The party won three seats, all in and around the city of Ponda in central Goa. The Dhavalikar brothers retained their seats – Deepak Dhavalikar from Priol and Sudin Dhavalikar from Marcaim. Meanwhile, the MGP candidate Lavoo Mamledar beat Congress heavyweight and incumbent Home Minister Ravi Naik. The BJP won another 21 seats.

The BJP-MGP alliance came to power with the support of 26 MLAs, including two independent candidates, in the 40 member house. Sudin was the minister for PWD, Transport and River Navigation in the new cabinet. Deepak holds the portfolios of Co-operation, Factories & Boilers.

The crisis had even reached the point where dissolution of the party was discussed. Although the MGP has been part of the BJP-led National Democratic Alliance, the MGP and the BJP have been experiencing a rift to where Dhavalikar demanded that Laxmikant Parsekar (BJP) should resign as chief minister of Goa as a precondition for alliance talks for the 2017 polls. Parsekar responded by saying that the MGP's MLAs should resign if they were not satisfied with the CM.

== Assembly Elections 2017 ==
Before the 2017 Goa Legislative Assembly election, MGP broke the alliance with Bharatiya Janata Party. Later, they joined hands with Goa Suraksha Manch of RSS leader Subhash Velingkar and Shiv Sena and contested of 27 seat in the state.

After the results were tallied, no party gained a clear majority; however, MGP won three seats. It decided to support the BJP-led coalition on the precondition that former CM Manohar Parrikar who was serving as the Minister of Defense in the central ministry be brought back to lead the government in Goa. The BJP agreed and MGP became a part of Manohar Parrikar led NDA government in Goa, Sudin Dhavalikar and Manohar Ajgaonkar of the MGP were given ministerial berths.

In March 2019, Sudin was appointed Deputy Chief Minister of Goa along with Goa Forward Party's Vijai Sardesai in the newly formed Government of Promod Sawant. However, nine days later, he was dropped form the ministry. This was when two MGP MLAs (Manohar Ajgaonkar and Dipak Pawaskar) joined the Bharatiya Janata Party; their resignations reduced the tally of MGP to one. Soon thereafter, Ajgaonkar was appointed Deputy Chief Minister of Goa.

== Assembly Elections 2022 ==
in December 2021, MGP agree a prepoll alliance with All India Trinamool Congress (AITC) for Goa election. MGP will contest 13 constituencies in the 40-seat Goa Assembly. After the election results were tallied, MGP won two seats and the party gave the support latter to the BJP to Form the government in Goa again.

== List of Chief Ministers ==
=== Chief Ministers of Goa, Daman and Diu Union Territory ===
Sr. No.	Name	Took office	Left office	Election
1	Dayanand Bandodkar	20 December 1963	2 December 1966	1963
1	Dayanand Bandodkar [2]	5 April 1967	23 March 1972	1967
1	Dayanand Bandodkar [3]	23 March 1972	12 August 1973	1972
2	Shashikala Kakodkar [1]	23 March 1972	12 August 1973	1972
2	Shashikala Kakodkar [1]	7 June 1977	27 April 1979	1977

=== Deputy Chief Ministers of Goa ===
Sr. No.	Name	Took office	Left office	Elections
1	Ravi S. Naik			
3	Ramakant Khalap			
8	Sudin Dhavalikar	19 March 2019	27 March 2019	2017

== See also ==
- Goa Opinion Poll
- United Goans Party
- List of political parties in India
