= Goa Legislative Assembly =

Unicameral legislature of the state of Goa in India

- 8th Goa Assembly
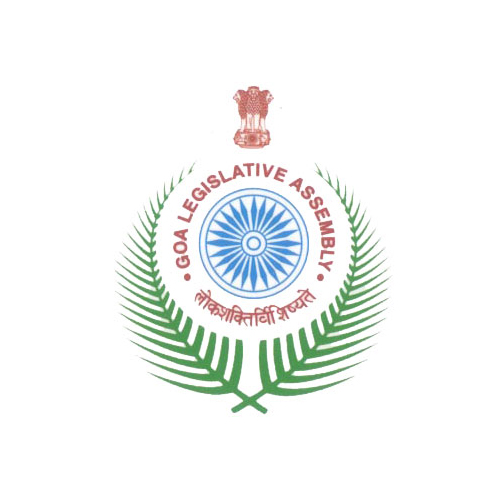

Type
- Type: Unicameral
- Term limits: 5 years

History
- Founded: 9 January 1964 (62 years ago)

Leadership
- Governor: Pusapati Ashok Gajapathi Raju since 26 July 2025
- Speaker: Ganesh Gaonkar, BJP since 25 September 2025
- Deputy Speaker: Joshua de Souza, BJP since 22 July 2022
- Leader of the House (Chief Minister): Pramod Sawant, BJP since 19 March 2019
- Leader of the Opposition: Yuri Alemao, INC since 30 September 2022

Structure
- Seats: 40
- Political groups: Government (31) NDA (31): BJP (26); MGP (2); IND (3); Opposition (7): INC (3); AAP (2); GFP (1); RGP (1); Vacant (2): Vacant (2)

Elections
- Voting system: First past the post
- Last election: 14 February 2022
- Next election: 2027

Meeting place
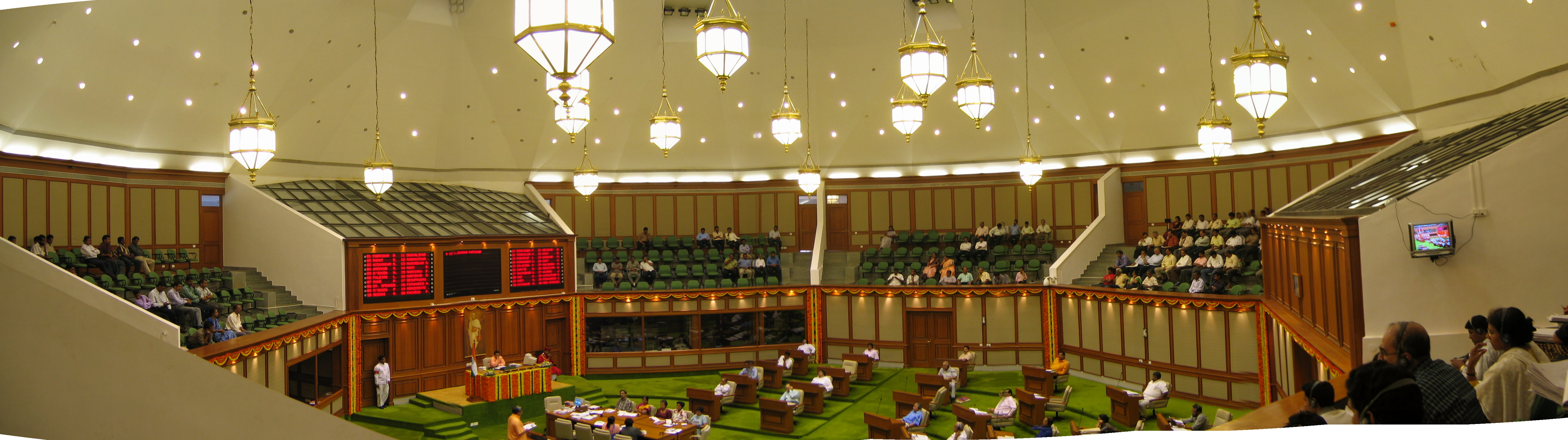
- Goa State Legislative Assembly Complex, Porvorim, Goa, India

Website
- www.goavidhansabha.gov.in

The Goa Legislative Assembly is the unicameral legislature of the state of Goa, India. The Assembly meets at the Goa State Legislative Assembly Complex in Porvorim. The Eighth Goa Legislative Assembly consists of 40 members. The assembly is in charge of the budget, the Assembly appropriates money for social programs, agricultural development, infrastructure development, etc. It is also responsible for proposing and levying taxes.

== History ==
Following the end of Portuguese rule in 1961, Goa was placed under military administration headed by Major General Kunhiraman Palat Candeth as Lieutenant-Governor. On 8 June 1962, military rule was replaced by civilian government when the Lieutenant-Governor nominated an informal Consultative Council of 29 nominated members to assist him in the administration of the territory. The first Council met on 24 September 1962 in a meeting open to the public.

The Assembly first convened on 9 January 1964 in the Secretariat building (Adil Shah Palace). Hence, 9 January is marked as "Legislator's Day" every year in Goa. In 1987, Goa became an Indian state and the number of seats in the Assembly was increased to 40.

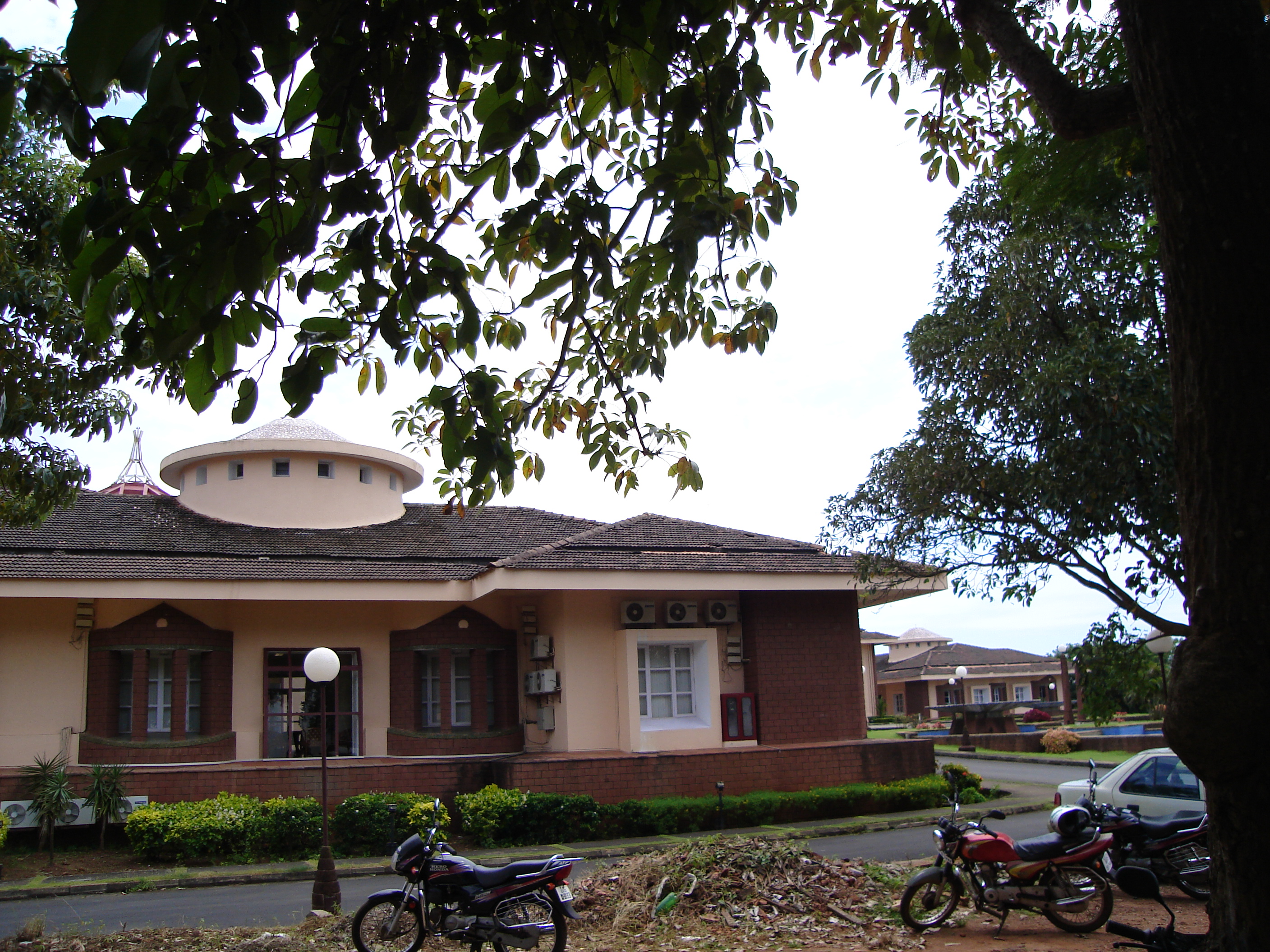
Goa Legislative Assembly Complex, 2006

The Assembly meets at the Goa State Legislative Assembly Complex in Porvorim, Bardez. The construction of the building began on 22 January 1994, and was completed on 5 March 2000.

== Composition ==
Composition after 14 September 2022 when 8 Congress MLA switched party and joined BJP.

Alliance	Party	Seats			Bench
Alliance	Party	Party	Alliance	Bench	Bench
NDA	Bharatiya Janata Party	28	33		Government
NDA	Maharashtrawadi Gomantak Party	2	33		Government
NDA	Independents	3	33		Government
I.N.D.I.A	Indian National Congress	3	4	7	Others
I.N.D.I.A	Goa Forward Party	1	4	7	Others
AAP	Aam Aadmi Party	2		7	Others
RGP	Revolutionary Goans Party	1		7	Others
Total		40			

== Members of Legislative Assembly ==
District	No.	Constituency	Name	Party	Alliance	Remarks
North Goa	1	Mandrem	Jit Arolkar	Maharashtrawadi Gomantak Party	NDA	
North Goa	2	Pernem (SC)	Pravin Arlekar	Bharatiya Janata Party	NDA	
North Goa	3	Bicholim	Chandrakant Shetye	Independent	NDA	
North Goa	4	Tivim	Nilkanth Halarnkar	Bharatiya Janata Party	NDA	Cabinet Minister
North Goa	5	Mapusa	Joshua D'Souza	Bharatiya Janata Party	NDA	
North Goa	6	Siolim	Delilah Lobo	Indian National Congress	UPA	Switched from INC to BJP on 14 September 2022
North Goa	6	Siolim	Delilah Lobo	Bharatiya Janata Party	NDA	Switched from INC to BJP on 14 September 2022
North Goa	7	Saligao	Kedar Naik	Indian National Congress	UPA	Switched from INC to BJP on 14 September 2022
North Goa	7	Saligao	Kedar Naik	Bharatiya Janata Party	NDA	Switched from INC to BJP on 14 September 2022
North Goa	8	Calangute	Michael Lobo	Indian National Congress	UPA	Switched from INC to BJP on 14 September 2022
North Goa	8	Calangute	Michael Lobo	Bharatiya Janata Party	NDA	Switched from INC to BJP on 14 September 2022
North Goa	9	Porvorim	Rohan Khaunte	Bharatiya Janata Party	NDA	Cabinet Minister
North Goa	10	Aldona	Carlos Alvares Ferreira	Indian National Congress	UPA	
North Goa	11	Panaji	Atanasio Monserrate	Bharatiya Janata Party	NDA	Cabinet Minister
North Goa	12	Taleigao	Jennifer Monserrate	Bharatiya Janata Party	NDA	
North Goa	13	Santa Cruz	Rodolfo Louis Fernandes	Indian National Congress	UPA	Switched from INC to BJP on 14 September 2022
North Goa	13	Santa Cruz	Rodolfo Louis Fernandes	Bharatiya Janata Party	NDA	Switched from INC to BJP on 14 September 2022
North Goa	14	St. Andre	Viresh Borkar	Revolutionary Goans Party		
North Goa	15	Cumbarjua	Rajesh Faldessai	Indian National Congress	UPA	Switched from INC to BJP on 14 September 2022
North Goa	15	Cumbarjua	Rajesh Faldessai	Bharatiya Janata Party	NDA	Switched from INC to BJP on 14 September 2022
North Goa	16	Maem	Premendra Shet	Bharatiya Janata Party	NDA	
North Goa	17	Sanquelim	Pramod Sawant	Bharatiya Janata Party	NDA	Chief Minister
North Goa	18	Poriem	Deviya Rane	Bharatiya Janata Party	NDA	
North Goa	19	Valpoi	Vishwajit Pratapsingh Rane	Bharatiya Janata Party	NDA	Cabinet Minister
North Goa	20	Priol	Govind Gaude	Bharatiya Janata Party	NDA	
North Goa	21	Ponda	Ravi Naik	Bharatiya Janata Party	NDA	Cabinet Minister
North Goa	22	Siroda	Subhash Shirodkar	Bharatiya Janata Party	NDA	Cabinet Minister
North Goa	23	Marcaim	Sudin Dhavalikar	Maharashtrawadi Gomantak Party	NDA	Cabinet Minister
South Goa	24	Mormugao	Sankalp Amonkar	Indian National Congress	UPA	Switched from INC to BJP on 14 September 2022
South Goa	24	Mormugao	Sankalp Amonkar	Bharatiya Janata Party	NDA	Switched from INC to BJP on 14 September 2022
South Goa	25	Vasco Da Gama	Krishna Salkar	Bharatiya Janata Party	NDA	
South Goa	26	Dabolim	Mauvin Godinho	Bharatiya Janata Party	NDA	Cabinet Minister
South Goa	27	Cortalim	Antonio Vas	Independent	NDA	
South Goa	28	Nuvem	Aleixo Sequeira	Indian National Congress	UPA	Switched from INC to BJP on 14 September 2022
South Goa	28	Nuvem	Aleixo Sequeira	Bharatiya Janata Party	NDA	Switched from INC to BJP on 14 September 2022
South Goa	29	Curtorim	Aleixo Lourenco	Independent	NDA	
South Goa	30	Fatorda	Vijai Sardesai	Goa Forward Party	UPA	
South Goa	31	Margao	Digambar Kamat	Indian National Congress	UPA	Switched from INC to BJP on 14 September 2022Cabinet Minister
South Goa	31	Margao	Digambar Kamat	Bharatiya Janata Party	NDA	Switched from INC to BJP on 14 September 2022Cabinet Minister
South Goa	32	Benaulim	Venzy Viegas	Aam Aadmi Party		
South Goa	33	Navelim	Ulhas Tuenkar	Bharatiya Janata Party	NDA	
South Goa	34	Cuncolim	Yuri Alemao	Indian National Congress	UPA	
South Goa	35	Velim	Cruz Silva	Aam Aadmi Party		
Kushavati	36	Quepem	Altone D'Costa	Indian National Congress	UPA	
Kushavati	37	Curchorem	Nilesh Cabral	Bharatiya Janata Party	NDA	
Kushavati	38	Sanvordem	Ganesh Gaonkar	Bharatiya Janata Party	NDA	
Kushavati	39	Sanguem	Subhash Phal Desai	Bharatiya Janata Party	NDA	Cabinet Minister
Kushavati	40	Canacona	Ramesh Tawadkar	Bharatiya Janata Party	NDA	Cabinet Minister

== Past Composition ==
1989–1994

20	18	2
INC	MGP	Ind

1994–1999

18	3	12	7
INC	UGDP	MGP	BJP	Ind

1999–2002

21	8			10	1
INC	GRCP	UGDP	MGP	BJP	Ind

2002–2007

16	6			17	1
INC	UGDP	NCP	MGP	BJP	Ind

2007–2012

16	8				14	2
INC	SGF	UGDP	NCP	MGP	BJP	Ind

2012–2017

9	5		21	5
INC	GVP	MGP	BJP	Ind

2017-2022

17	7			13	3
INC	GFP	NCP	MGP	BJP	Ind

2022–Present

11	9				20	3
INC	AAP	GFP	RGP	MGP	BJP	Ind
