= 2024 Indian general election in Goa =

Election to constitute the 18th Lok Sabha in 2024 in Goa

- 7 May 2024

All the 2 Goa Lok Sabha seats
- Opinion polls
- Turnout: 76.99% (▲1.85%)
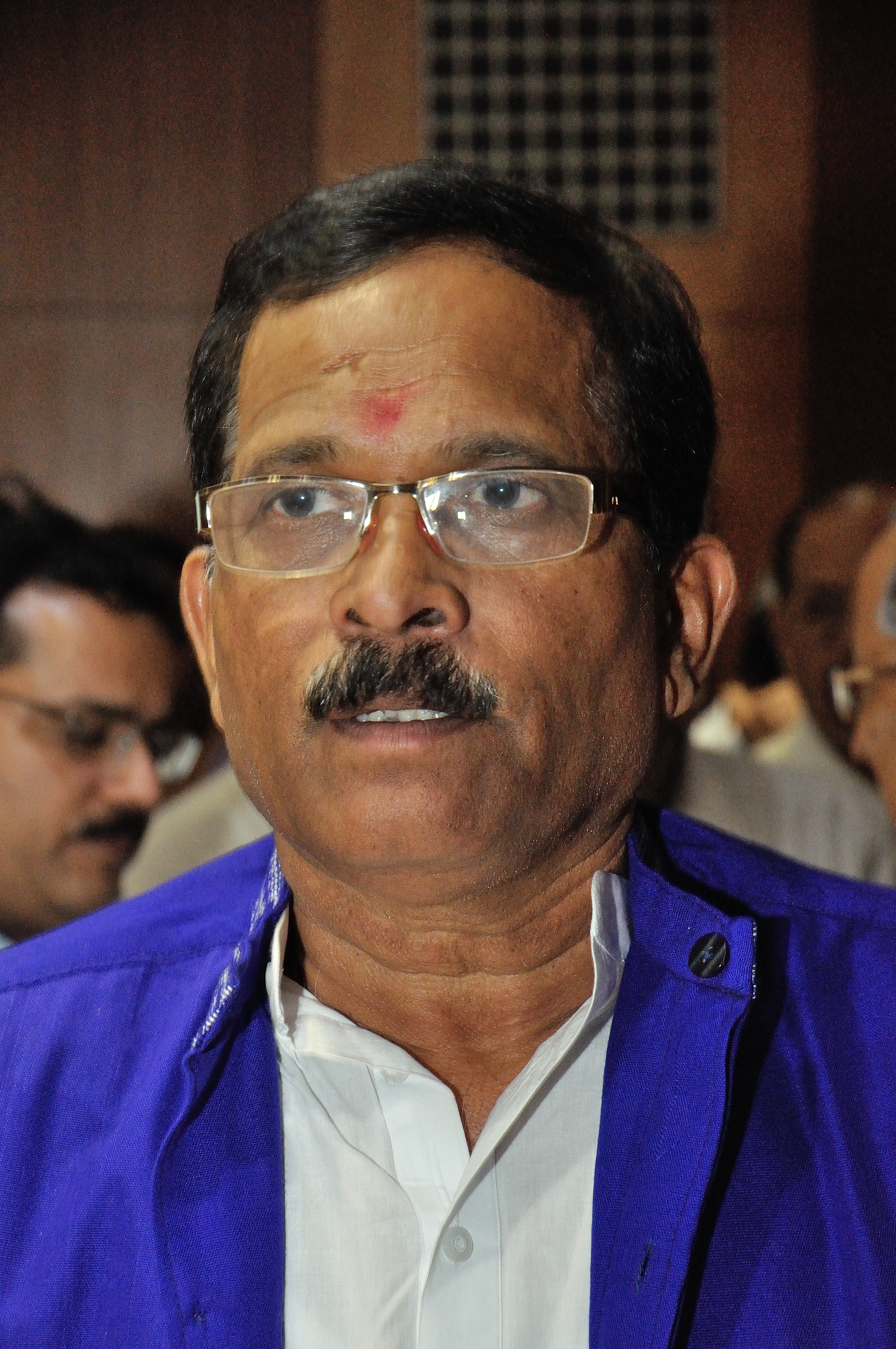

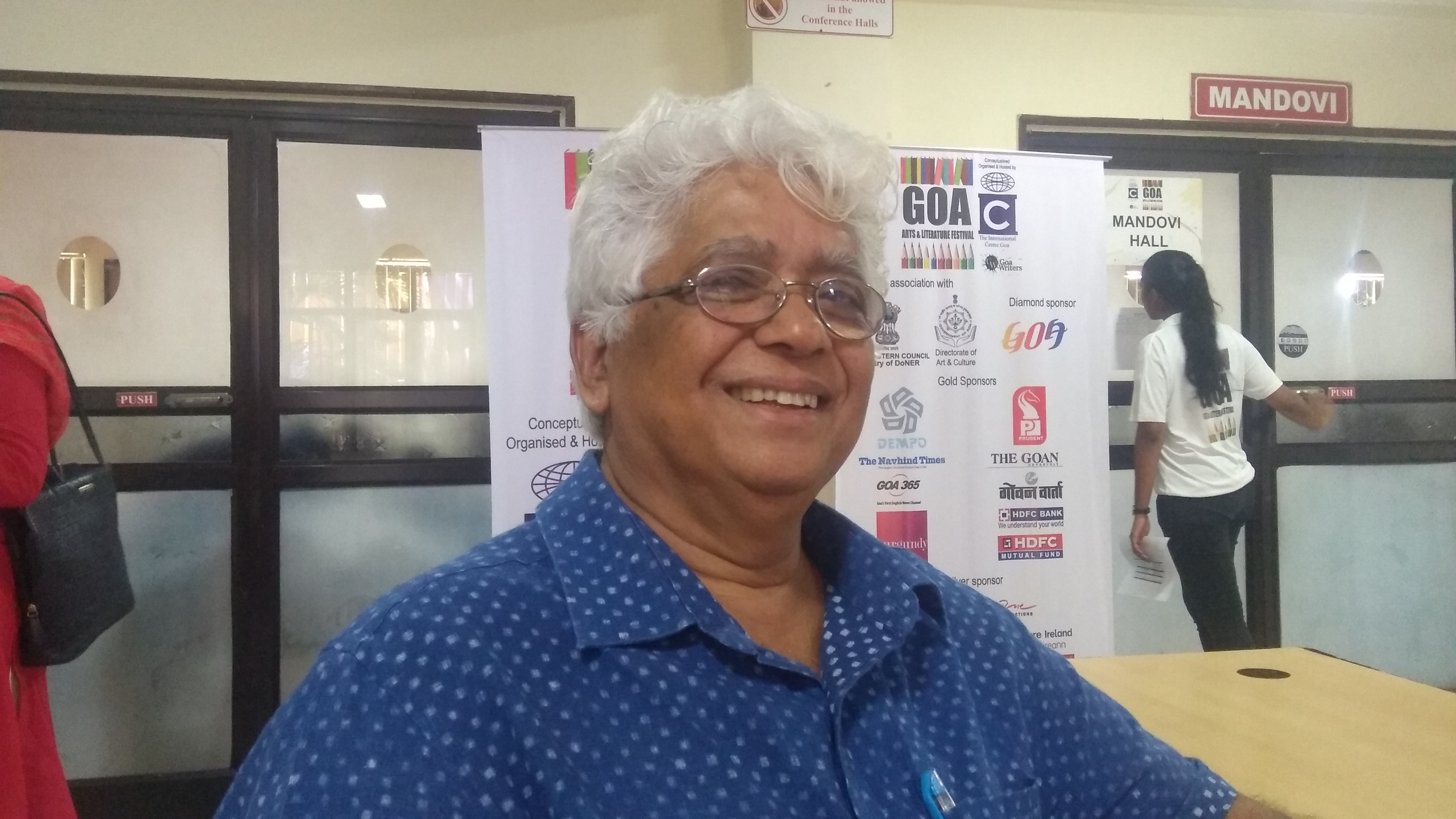
	First party	Second party
Leader	Shripad Naik	Ramakant Khalap
Party	BJP	INC
Alliance	NDA	INDIA
Leader since	2021	2024
Leader's seat	North Goa (won)	North Goa (lost)
Last election	51.19%, 1 seat	42.92%, 1 seat
Seats won	1	1
Seat change	Steady	Steady
Popular vote	461,627	359,147
Percentage	50.89%	39.67%
Swing	▼0.30%	▼3.25%
- Seatwise Result Map of the 2024 general election in Goa.
Prime Minister before election
Narendra Modi
BJP
Prime Minister after election
Narendra Modi
BJP

The 2024 Indian general election was held in Goa on 7 May 2024 to elect 2 members of the 18th Lok Sabha.

== Election schedule ==
Poll event	Phase
Poll event	III
Notification date	12 April 2024
Last date for filing nomination	19 April 2024
Scrutiny of nomination	20 April 2024
Last Date for withdrawal of nomination	22 April 2024
Date of poll	7 May 2024
Date of counting of votes/Result	4 June 2024
No. of constituencies	2

== Parties and alliances ==
Party	Flag	Symbol	Leader	Seats contested
Bharatiya Janata Party			Shripad Naik	2
Indian National Congress			Amit Patkar	2
Bahujan Samaj Party				2
Revolutionary Goans Party			Manoj Parab	2
Akhil Bhartiya Parivar Party				1
Corruption Abolition Party				1

== Candidates ==
Constituency							
Constituency		NDA		INDIA		Others	
1	North Goa	BJP	Shripad Naik	INC	Ramakant Khalap	RGP	Manoj Parab
2	South Goa	BJP	Pallavi Shrinivas Dempo	INC	Capt. Viriato Fernandes	RGP	Rubert Pereira

== Survey and polls ==
=== Opinion polls ===
Polling agency	Date published	Margin of error				Lead
Polling agency	Date published	Margin of error	NDA	INDIA	Others	Lead
ABP News-CVoter	April 2024	±5%	1	1	0	Tie
ABP News-CVoter	March 2024	±5%	1	1	0	Tie
India TV-CNX	March 2024	±3%	2	0	0	NDA
India Today-CVoter	February 2024	±3-5%	1	1	0	Tie
Times Now-ETG	December 2023	±3%	1-2	0-1	0	NDA
India TV-CNX	October 2023	±3%	2	0	0	NDA
Times Now-ETG	September 2023	±3%	1-2	0-1	0	NDA
Times Now-ETG	August 2023	±3%	1-2	0-1	0	NDA

Polling agency	Date published	Margin of error				Lead
Polling agency	Date published	Margin of error	NDA	INDIA	Others	Lead
ABP News-CVoter	April 2024	±5%	46%	44.9%	9.1%	1.1
ABP News-CVoter	March 2024	±5%	45.6%	48.3%	6.1%	2.7
India Today-CVoter	February 2024	±3-5%	37%	55%	8%	18

=== Exit polls ===
Polling agency				Lead
Polling agency	NDA	INDIA	Others	Lead
TV9 Bharatvarsh- People's Insight - Polstrat	2	0	0	NDA
DB Live	1±1	1±1	0	Tie
2019 election	1	1	0	Tie
Actual results	1	1	0	Tie

== Results ==
=== Results by alliance or party ===
Alliance/ Party		Popular vote			Seats		
Alliance/ Party		Votes	%	±pp	Contested	Won	+/−
NDA	BJP	455,618	50.79%	▼0.40%	2	1	Steady
INDIA	INC	356,213	39.71%	▼3.21%	2	1	Steady
Others		69,702	7.69%		6	0	Steady
IND		4,897	0.54%		6	0	Steady
NOTA		11,165	1.23%				
Total		906,538	100%	-	16	2	-

=== Results by constituency ===
Constituency		Turnout	Winner				Runner-up				Margin
Constituency		Turnout	Candidate	Party	Votes	%	Candidate	Party	Votes	%	Margin
1	North Goa	78.73 ▲	Shripad Yesso Naik	BJP	2,57,326	56.43	Ramakant Khalap	INC	1,41,311	30.99	1,16,015
2	South Goa	75.29 ▲	Capt. Viriato Fernandes	INC	2,17,836	48.35	Pallavi Shrinivas Dempo	BJP	2,04,301	45.35	13,535

=== Assembly Segment wise leads ===
Constituency		Winner			Runner-up			Margin
#	Name	Party	Votes	%	Party	Votes	%	Margin
North Goa Lok Sabha constituency
1	Mandrem	BJP	13,768	52.17	INC	9,363	35.48	4,405
2	Pernem	BJP	14,216	54.77	INC	6,269	24.15	7,947
3	Bicholim	BJP	15,523	64.68	INC	5,794	24.14	9,729
4	Tivim	BJP	11,799	52.57	INC	6,873	30.62	4,926
5	Mapusa	BJP	12,330	56.04	INC	8,170	37.13	4,160
6	Siolim	BJP	10,427	45.72	INC	8,296	36.37	2,131
7	Saligao	BJP	11,162	53.20	INC	7,667	36.54	3,495
8	Calangute	INC	9,639	49.87	BJP	7,482	38.71	2,152
9	Porvorim	BJP	12,613	60.55	INC	6,918	33.21	5,695
10	Aldona	INC	9,632	45.60	BJP	9,552	45.22	80
11	Panaji	BJP	8,108	52.86	INC	6,057	39.49	2,051
12	Taleigao	BJP	10,810	48.85	INC	9,274	41.91	1,536
13	St. Cruz	INC	10,688	50.04	BJP	8,472	39.66	2,216
14	St. Andre	INC	5,675	37.75	BJP	5,599	37.24	76
15	Cumbarjua	BJP	9,307	46.33	INC	7,984	39.65	1,323
16	Maem	BJP	15,707	64.98	INC	4,949	20.47	10,758
17	Sanquelim	BJP	19,426	79.10	INC	3,662	14.91	15,764
18	Poriem	BJP	23,597	78.52	INC	3,639	12.10	19,958
19	Valpoi	BJP	18,606	68.14	INC	5,601	20.49	13,005
20	Priol	BJP	15,308	61.38	RGP	4,781	19.17	10,527
South Goa Lok Sabha constituency
21	Ponda	BJP	14,189	58.11	INC	8,592	35.19	5,597
22	Siroda	BJP	12,524	53.30	INC	7,539	32.08	4,985
23	Marcaim	BJP	14,722	66.00	INC	3,974	17.81	10,748
24	Mormugao	BJP	8,269	54.67	INC	6,204	41.02	2,065
25	Vasco Da Gama	BJP	13,154	53.57	INC	10,523	42.85	2,631
26	Dabolim	BJP	10,651	55.20	INC	7,927	41.08	2,724
27	Cortalim	INC	12,377	53.56	BJP	9,454	40.91	2,923
28	Nuvem	INC	16,365	81.17	BJP	2,677	13.27	13,688
29	Curtorim	INC	14,975	68.62	BJP	5,787	26.51	9,188
30	Fatorda	INC	12,318	53.67	BJP	9,881	43.05	2,437
31	Margao	BJP	11,474	51.45	INC	10,151	45.51	1,323
32	Benaulim	INC	16,687	83.62	BJP	2,506	12.55	14,181
33	Navelim	INC	12,961	62.41	BJP	7,151	34.43	5,810
34	Cuncolim	INC	12,957	60.25	BJP	7,401	34.45	5,556
35	Velim	INC	17,251	78.34	BJP	3,901	17.71	13,350
36	Quepem	INC	12,721	48.12	BJP	11,937	45.15	784
37	Curchorem	BJP	11,300	51.63	INC	9,603	43.87	1,613
38	Sanvordem	BJP	15,618	63.20	INC	6,277	25.40	9,341
39	Sanguem	BJP	12,884	58.60	INC	7,527	34.23	5,357
40	Canacona	BJP	16,318	60.12	INC	9,134	33.65	7,178

== Assembly segments wise lead of Parties ==
2024 Goa Lok Sabha Elections Assembly Wise Leads Map

Party	Assembly segments	Position in Assembly (as of 2022 election)
Bharatiya Janata Party	27	28
Indian National Congress	13	1
Independents	0	3
Maharashtrawadi Gomantak Party	0	2
Aam Aadmi Party	0	2
Goa Forward Party	0	1
Revolutionary Goans Party	0	1
Total	40	

== See also ==
- 2024 Indian general election in Gujarat
- 2024 Indian general election in Haryana
- 2024 Indian general election in Himachal Pradesh
