= Manoj Parab =

Indian politician and activist (born 1985)

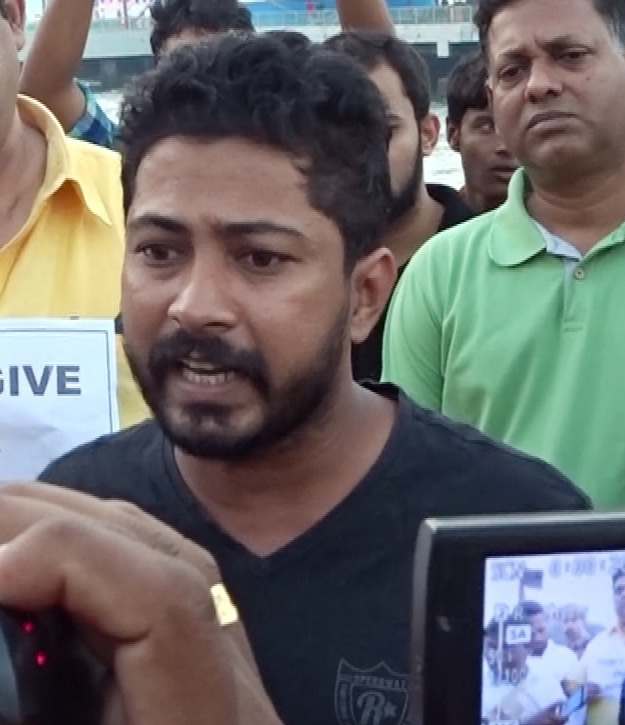
- Parab during the MWDT protest in 2017

President of the Revolutionary Goans Party
- In office 2023 – 21 May 2026
- Preceded by: Viresh Borkar
- Succeeded by: Shavina Shirodkar (as State President)

Personal details
- Born: Tukaram Bharat Parab; 18 August 1985 (age 41) Pirna, Goa, India
- Party: Revolutionary Goans Party (2021–2026)
- Other political affiliations: Aam Aadmi Party (2016–2017)
- Spouse: Madhavi Parab (div. 2022) Veena Parab (m. 2022)
- Education: Goa University (MSc)
- Occupation: Politician; geologist; businessman; activist
- Website: facebook.com/ManojParabOfficial
- Manoj Parab's voice Parab talking about Art and Culture Minister Govind Gaude, in response to the latter's video. Recorded 22 March 2020

Tukaram Bharat "Manoj" Parab (born 18 August 1985) is an Indian politician, businessman, activist, and geologist who served as the president of the Revolutionary Goans Party (RGP) from 2023 to 2026. He co-founded the non-governmental organization Revolutionary Goans (RG) in 2017, and it was recognized as a political party by the Election Commission of India in 2022.

Prior to forming the NGO, Parab joined the Aam Aadmi Party (AAP) as a member in February 2016, ahead of the 2017 Goa Legislative Assembly election. He subsequently left to form the Revolutionary Goans (RG) on 3 March 2017, along with seven founding members, including Viresh Borkar and Vishvesh Naik, whom he had met during his involvement with the Aam Aadmi Party.

In May 2026, Parab resigned as president of the RGP and also stated that he was quitting active politics.

== Early life ==
Tukaram Bharat Parab was born on 18 August 1985 in Pirna, Goa to Bharat and Chandralekha Parab. His father, Bharat, was a tabla craftsman and repairer, as well as a businessman. Parab was raised in Tivim, Goa. He completed his early education at a Catholic school before pursuing further studies. In 2008, he completed his Master of Science degree in Geology from Goa University. In the third year of his Bachelor of Science studies, Parab ranked first in Geology.

Parab began his professional career in 2008 as a geologist, working for prominent mining companies such as Salgaoncar Mines, Sesa Goa Mines, and Fomento Mines. Seeking better financial opportunities, he later moved outside Goa and entered the offshore oil industry, taking positions in Mumbai and Gujarat.

Parab spent three years working in Mumbai's offshore sector before transitioning into entrepreneurship. Alongside a business partner, he established a Vodafone Mini Store in Panjim. In 2013, he founded an independent water tank cleaning enterprise, which he continues to manage.

== Political career ==
=== Entry into politics: 2022 Goa Legislative Assembly election ===
In January 2022, Parab was announced as the Revolutionary Goans Party (RGP)'s chief ministerial candidate for the 2022 Goa Legislative Assembly election. He contested from two constituencies, Valpoi and Tivim. Parab said he chose Tivim because it was where he had grown up and because of his concerns about the Bharatiya Janata Party (BJP), whose actions he said were "destroying Goa".

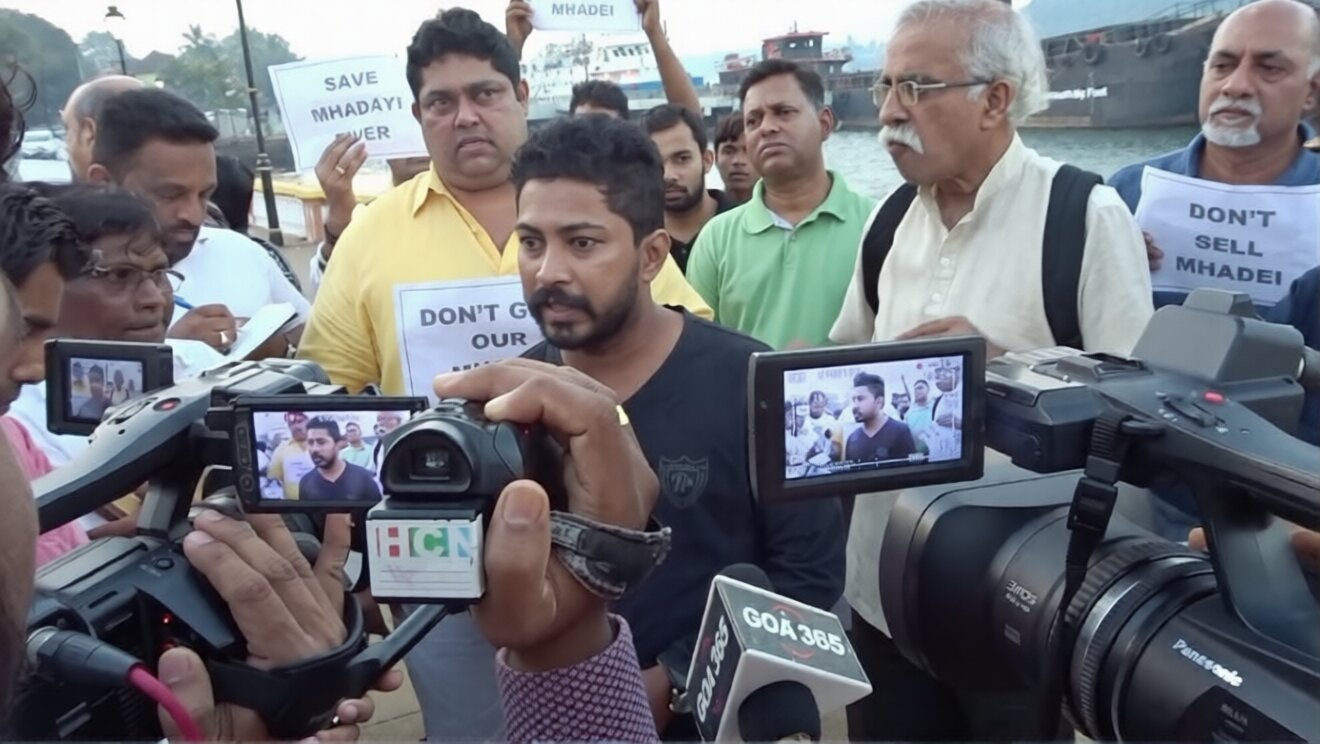
Parab along with legislator Reginaldo, activist Viriato Fernandes, and environmentalist Claude Alvares at the 2017 MWDT protest

Parab lost in both the constituencies. In Tivim, he secured the third position, losing to the two-term BJP candidate Nilkanth Halarnkar by a margin of 4,363 votes. Similarly, in Valpoi, he secured the second position but lost to the five-term BJP candidate Vishwajit Rane by a margin of 8,085 votes.

=== Post-election: Criticism of the Goa Congress and the Government of Goa ===
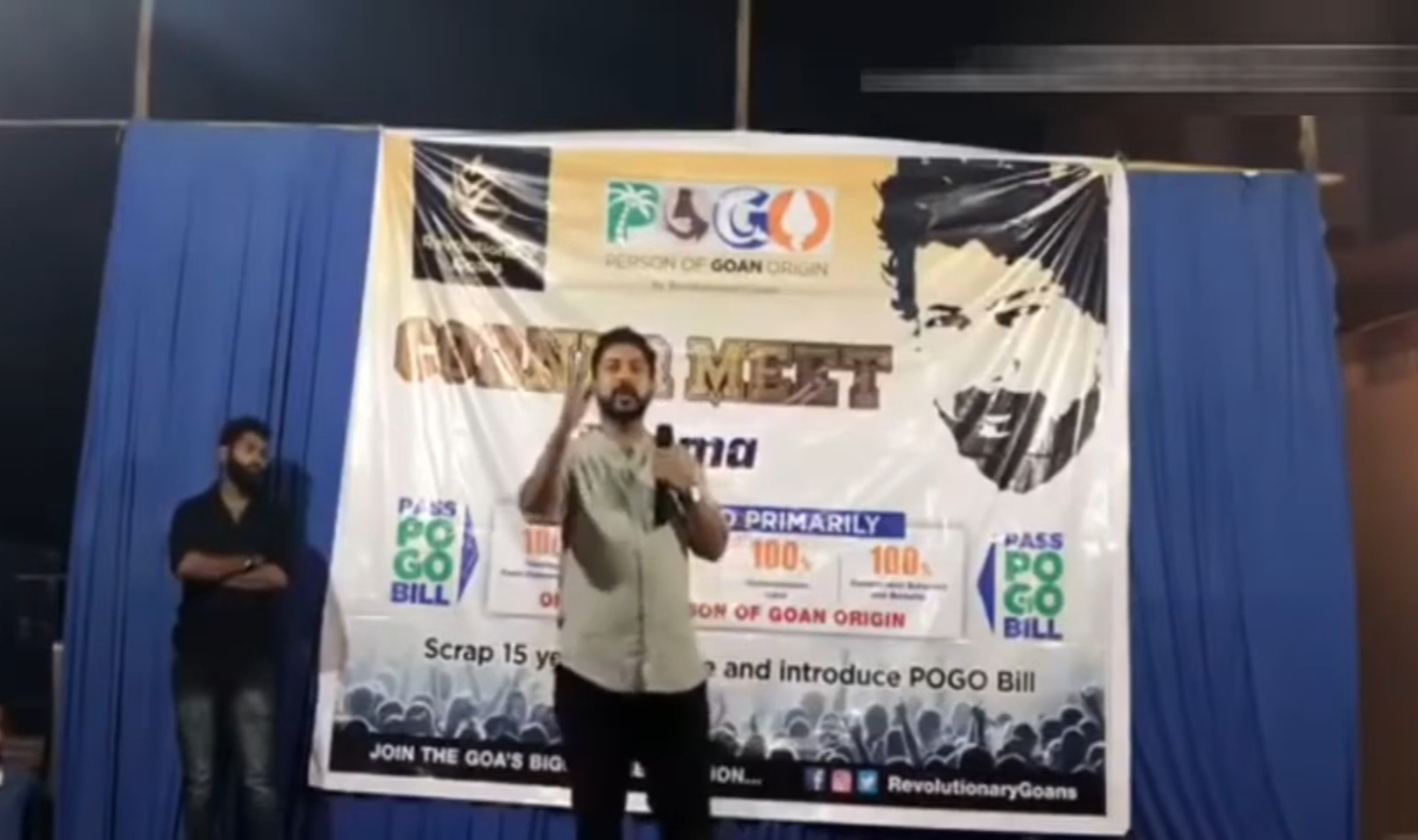
Parab during a public meeting, 2020

Following the election, Parab outlined the strategic objectives of his party to enhance its presence by 2027. He sought mentorship of individuals from different backgrounds. In the run-up to the 2022 Goa village panchayat elections, Parab advocated the need for contesting elections at the grassroots level to combat systemic issues and end corruption at the village level. He refuted allegations of being responsible for vote division in the 2022 Assembly election, stating that he merely provided voters with additional choices. Parab indicated his intention to address the issue of Goan identity through his lone RGP MLA Viresh Borkar in the assembly.

In October 2022, Parab accused the Goa Congress of being affiliated with the BJP after Olencio Simoes, a leader from the Goa Congress, stated that the Congress party had lost ten seats in the 2022 Assembly election due to the Revolutionary Goans Party. The same month, Parab made an announcement to engage with leaders from regional parties across the country. He emphasized his party's commitment to its ideology and expressed his intention to reintroduce the POGO Bill in the state legislative assembly after it was deemed "unconstitutional" by the Government of Goa. Parab held meetings with Maharashtra Chief Minister Eknath Shinde and Maharashtra Navnirman Sena (MNS) president Raj Thackeray in Mumbai to gain knowledge of their party policies.

In February 2023, allegations regarding unauthorized commercial activity in government toilet complexes in Calangute led Parab to publicly criticize political figures, including Tourism Minister of Goa Rohan Khaunte and Calangute MLA Michael Lobo. Parab then questioned Tourism Director Nikhil Dessai's accountability, calling for him to take responsibility for permitting such operations within the tourism department.

In November 2023, Parab objected to a proposal by the Government of Goa to legalize encroachments on communidade property. He argued that it was a political move intended to secure voters’ support for the BJP in several settlements across Goa. Parab described the proposal as an alternative form of the “Bhumipatra Bill” and stated that it reflected a focus on the interests of migrant voters in key constituencies.

=== 2024 Lok Sabha election and political hiatus ===
In December 2023, Parab was announced as the candidate for the North Goa Lok Sabha constituency in the 2024 Indian general election. Among the main issues he raised was the Mhadei River dispute between Goa and Karnataka. Parab also stated that he did not want migrant voters, specifically those involved in illegal activities such as slum encroachments. He secured third place and was defeated by five-time BJP MP Shripad Naik by a margin of 2,11,633 votes.

After the Lok Sabha election results in June 2024, Parab took a break from active politics for around seven months. He returned in January 2025, stating that during this period he had collected feedback from voters across 28 to 30 constituencies to help prepare the RGP for the 2027 Goa Legislative Assembly election. He said they intended to contest a limited number of seats and identified land encroachment in Goa by what he described as the "Delhi lobby" as one of his central political concerns.

=== 2026: Quitting politics ===
In May 2026, Parab resigned as president of the RGP and also claimed to have "quit active politics forever", expressing his displeasure with internal conflicts within the party and "individual power-centric politics". In November 2026, he rejoined RGP as a party member.

== Personal life ==
In a 2022 interview with Outlook, Parab recounted his personal experience, highlighting the challenges faced by many Goans when it comes to property ownership. He mentioned that he and his family lived in Colvale on a rental basis for around 20–25 years before relocating to Bicholim, where they purchased their own apartment.

Parab has been married twice. His first wife was Madhavi Parab, a homemaker, until their divorce in 2022. On 9 December 2022, Parab married Veena Parab, also a homemaker, in a private ceremony.

Parab resides in Kelwada, Pirna, Goa.

== Assessments ==
In 2022, political analyst Prakash Kamat expressed doubts about some of Parab's political ideologies, suggesting that they may not align with the Constitution of India. Kamat highlighted Parab's POGO Bill, which advocated granting exclusive rights to Goans. He stated that Parab had managed to generate enthusiasm among the people, as reflected in his significant vote share in the 2022 Goa Legislative Assembly election. According to Kamat, this led Parab to be taken “seriously” as a political figure.
