= 2027 Goa Legislative Assembly election =

Elections for the 9th Legislative assembly of Goa

- By February 2027

All 40 seats in the Goa Legislative Assembly 21 seats needed for a majority
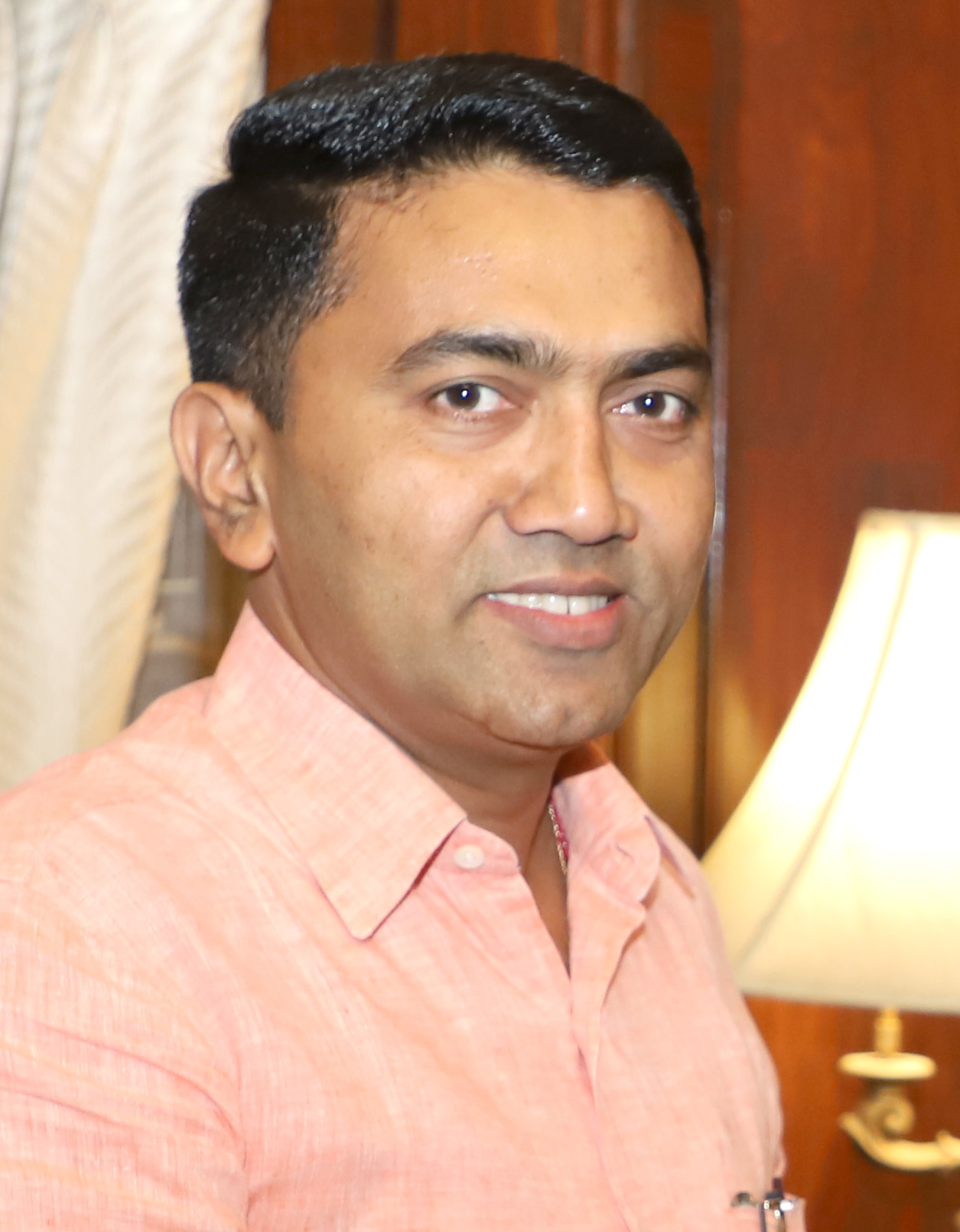

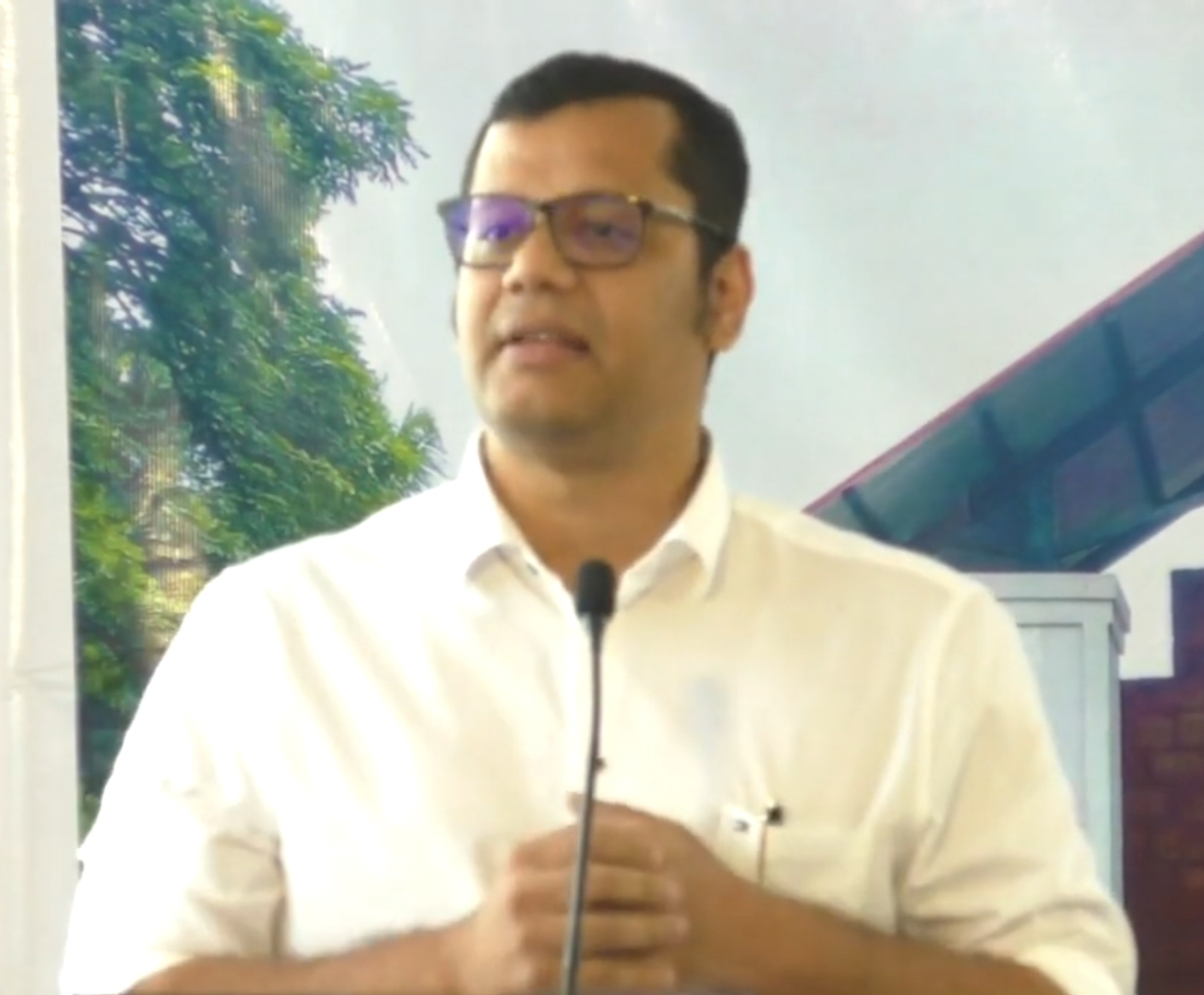
Leader	Pramod Sawant	Yuri Alemao
Party	BJP	INC
Leader since	2019	2022
Leader's seat	Sanquelim	Cuncolim
Last election	33.3%, 20 seats	23.5%, 11 seats
Current seats	28	3
Seats needed	Steady	▲18
- Map of the assembly constituencies in Goa
Incumbent Chief Minister
Pramod Sawant
BJP

Legislative assembly elections are expected to be held in Goa in February 2027 to elect all 40 members of the Goa Legislative Assembly. Pramod Sawant is the incumbent Chief Minister of Goa.

== Schedule ==
Poll Event	Schedule
Notification Date	TBD
Last Date for filing nomination	TBD
Scrutiny of nomination	TBD
Last Date for Withdrawal of nomination	TBD
Date of Poll	TBD
Date of Counting of Votes	TBD

== Parties and Alliances ==
=== National Democratic Alliance ===
National Democratic Alliance
Party	Flag	Symbol	Leader	Seats contested
Bharatiya Janata Party			Pramod Sawant	30
Maharashtrawadi Gomantak Party			Sudin Dhavalikar	10
Total				

=== Indian National Developmental Inclusive Alliance ===
Indian National Developmental Inclusive Alliance
Party	Flag	Symbol	Leader	Seats contested
Indian National Congress			Yuri Alemao	20
Revolutionary Goans Party			Viresh Borkar	8
Goa Forward Party			Vijai Sardesai	12
Total				

=== Others ===
Party	Flag	Symbol	Leader	Seats contested
Aam Aadmi Party			Valmiki Naik	40
Mamata All India Trinamool Congress				40
Nationalist Congress Party				40
Shiv Sena				40

== Candidates ==
District	Constituency					
District	Constituency		NDA		INDIA	
North Goa	1	Mandrem	MGP		INC	
North Goa	2	Pernem (SC)	BJP		INC	
North Goa	3	Bicholim	BJP		INC	
North Goa	4	Tivim	BJP		INC	
North Goa	5	Mapusa	BJP		INC	
North Goa	6	Siolim	BJP		INC	
North Goa	7	Saligao	BJP		INC	
North Goa	8	Calangute	BJP		INC	
North Goa	9	Porvorim	BJP	Rohan Khaunte	INC	
North Goa	10	Aldona	BJP		INC	Carlos Alvares Ferreira
North Goa	11	Panaji	BJP		INC	
North Goa	12	Taleigao	BJP		INC	
North Goa	13	Santa Cruz	BJP		INC	
North Goa	14	St. Andre	BJP		RGP	Viresh Borkar
North Goa	15	Cumbarjua	BJP		INC	
North Goa	16	Maem	BJP	Premendra Shet	GFP	
North Goa	17	Sanquelim	BJP	Pramod Sawant	INC	
North Goa	18	Poriem	BJP	Deviya Vishwajit Rane	INC	
North Goa	19	Valpoi	BJP	Vishwajit Pratapsingh Rane	INC	
North Goa	20	Priol	BJP		INC	
North Goa	21	Ponda	BJP		INC	
North Goa	22	Siroda	BJP		INC	
North Goa	23	Marcaim	MGP		INC	
South Goa	24	Mormugao	BJP		INC	
South Goa	25	Vasco Da Gama	BJP	Krishna Salkar	INC	
South Goa	26	Dabolim	BJP		INC	
South Goa	27	Cortalim	BJP		INC	
South Goa	28	Nuvem	BJP		INC	
South Goa	29	Curtorim	BJP		INC	
South Goa	30	Fatorda	BJP		GFP	Vijai Sardesai
South Goa	31	Margao	BJP	Digambar Kamat	INC	
South Goa	32	Benaulim	BJP		INC	
South Goa	33	Navelim	BJP		INC	
South Goa	34	Cuncolim	BJP		INC	Yuri Alemao
South Goa	35	Velim	BJP		INC	
Kushavati	36	Quepem	BJP		INC	Altone D'Costa
Kushavati	37	Curchorem	BJP		INC	
Kushavati	38	Sanvordem	BJP		INC	
Kushavati	39	Sanguem	BJP		INC	
Kushavati	40	Canacona	BJP		INC	

== Surveys and polls ==
=== Opinion polls ===
Seat Projections
Polling agency	Date published	Sample size	Margin of Error				Lead	Ref
Polling agency	Date published	Sample size	Margin of Error	NDA	INDIA	Others	Lead	Ref

Vote Share Projections
Polling agency	Date published	Sample size	Margin of Error				Lead	Ref
Polling agency	Date published	Sample size	Margin of Error	NDA	INDIA	Others	Lead	Ref

== Results ==
=== Results by alliance or party ===
Alliance/ Party		Popular vote			Seats		
Alliance/ Party		Votes	%	±pp	Contested	Won	+/−
NDA	BJP						
NDA	MGP						
NDA	Total						
INDIA	INC						
INDIA	RGP						
INDIA	GFP						
INDIA	Total						
Others							
Independents							
NOTA							
Total			100%	—		40	—

=== Results by district ===
District	Seats			
District	Seats	NDA	INDIA	OTH
North Goa	23			
South Goa	12			
Kushavati	5			
Total	40			

=== Results by constituency ===
District	Constituency		Winner				Runner Up				Margin
District	No.	Name	Candidate	Party	Votes	%	Candidate	Party	Votes	%	Margin
North Goa	1	Mandrem									
North Goa	2	Pernem (SC)									
North Goa	3	Bicholim									
North Goa	4	Tivim									
North Goa	5	Mapusa									
North Goa	6	Siolim									
North Goa	7	Saligao									
North Goa	8	Calangute									
North Goa	9	Porvorim									
North Goa	10	Aldona									
North Goa	11	Panaji									
North Goa	12	Taleigao									
North Goa	13	Santa Cruz									
North Goa	14	St. Andre									
North Goa	15	Cumbarjua									
North Goa	16	Maem									
North Goa	17	Sanquelim									
North Goa	18	Poriem									
North Goa	19	Valpoi									
North Goa	20	Priol									
North Goa	21	Ponda									
North Goa	22	Siroda									
North Goa	23	Marcaim									
South Goa	24	Mormugao									
South Goa	25	Vasco Da Gama									
South Goa	26	Dabolim									
South Goa	27	Cortalim									
South Goa	28	Nuvem									
South Goa	29	Curtorim									
South Goa	30	Fatorda									
South Goa	31	Margao									
South Goa	32	Benaulim									
South Goa	33	Navelim									
South Goa	34	Cuncolim									
South Goa	35	Velim									
Kushavati	36	Quepem									
Kushavati	37	Curchorem									
Kushavati	38	Sanvordem									
Kushavati	39	Sanguem									
Kushavati	40	Canacona									

== See also ==
- Elections in Goa
- Politics of Goa
