= 2022 Goa Legislative Assembly election =

Election in Indian state

- 14 February 2022

All 40 seats of the Goa Legislative Assembly 21 seats needed for a majority
- Turnout: 81.89% (▼0.67 pp)
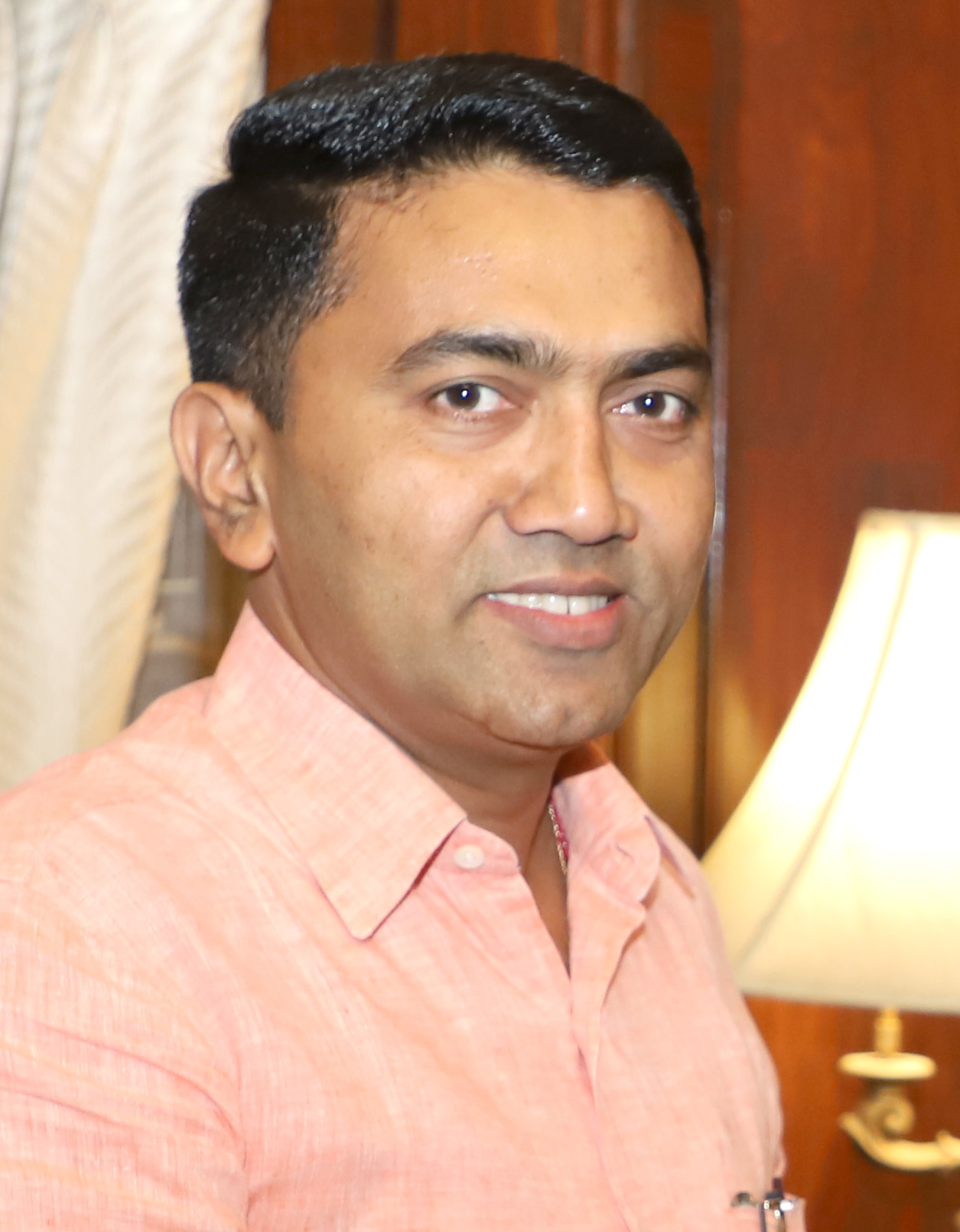

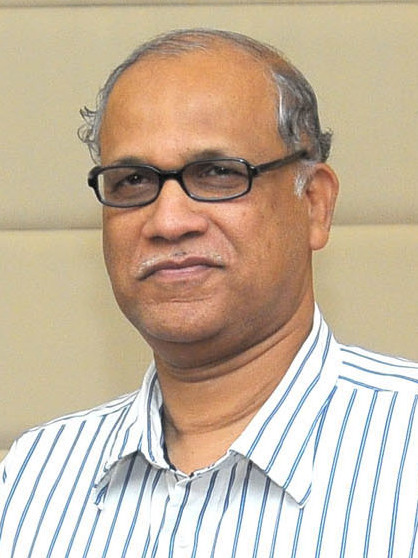

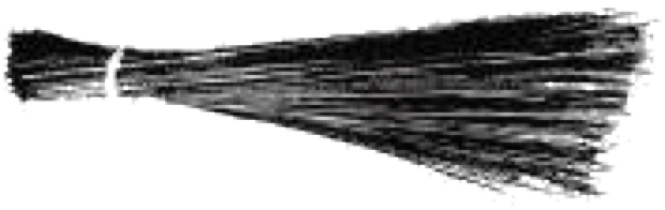
	First party	Second party	Third party
Leader	Pramod Sawant	Digambar Kamat	Amit Palekar
Party	BJP	INC	AAP
Alliance	NDA	UPA	-
Leader's seat	Sanquelim (won)	Margao (won)	St. Cruz (lost)
Last election	32.5%, 13 seats	28.4%, 17 seats	6.3%, 0 seat
Seats won	20	11	2
Seat change	▲7	▼6	▲2
Popular vote	316,573	222,948	64,354
Percentage	33.3%	23.5%	6.77%
Swing	▲0.8 pp	▼4.9 pp	▲0.5 pp

- Structure of the Goa Legislative Assembly after the election
Chief Minister before election
Pramod Sawant
BJP
Elected Chief Minister
Pramod Sawant
BJP

Legislative Assembly elections were held in Goa on 14 February 2022 to elect 40 members of the Eighth Goa Legislative Assembly. The votes were counted and the results were declared on 10 March 2022.

== Background ==
The tenure of Goa Legislative Assembly is scheduled to end on 15 March 2022. The previous assembly elections were held in February 2017 to elect the members of the Seventh Goa Legislative Assembly. After the election, a coalition of Bharatiya Janata Party, Goa Forward Party and Maharashtrawadi Gomantak Party formed the state government, with Manohar Parrikar becoming the Chief Minister.

After the death of Manohar Parrikar, Pramod Sawant was sworn in as the Chief Minister on 19 March 2019.

== Election schedule ==
The election schedule was announced by the Election Commission of India on 8 January 2022.

S.No.	Event	Date	Day
1.	Date for Nominations	21 January 2022	Friday
2.	Last Date for filing Nominations	28 January 2022	Friday
3.	Date for scrutiny of nominations	29 January 2022	Saturday
4.	Last date for withdrawal of candidatures	31 January 2022	Monday
5.	Date of poll	14 February 2022	Monday
6.	Date of counting	10 March 2022	Thursday

== Parties and alliances ==
=== National Democratic Alliance ===
National Democratic Alliance

No.	Party	Flag	Symbol	Leader	Seats contested	Male candidates	Female candidates
1.	Bharatiya Janata Party			Pramod Sawant	40	37	3

=== United Progressive Alliance ===
United Progressive Alliance

No.	Party	Flag	Symbol	Leader	Seats contested	Male candidates	Female candidates
1.	Indian National Congress			Digambar Kamat	37	35	2
2.	Goa Forward Party			Vijai Sardesai	3	3	0

=== Aam Aadmi Party ===
No.	Party	Flag	Symbol	Leader	Seats contested	Male candidates	Female candidates
1.	Aam Aadmi Party			Amit Palekar	39	36	3

=== All India Trinamool Congress+ ===
No.	Party	Flag	Symbol	Leader	Seats contested	Male candidates	Female candidates
1.	Trinamool Congress			Mahua Moitra	26	22	4
2.	Maharashtrawadi Gomantak Party			Sudin Dhavalikar	13	13	0

=== Nationalist Congress Party+ ===
No.	Party	Flag	Symbol	Leader	Seats contested	Male candidates	Female candidates
1.	Nationalist Congress Party			Jose Philip D'Souza	13	13	0
2.	Shiv Sena			Jitesh Kamat	10	8	2

=== Others ===
No.	Party	Flag	Symbol	Leader	Seats contested	Male candidates	Female candidates
1.	Revolutionary Goans Party			Manoj Parab	38	36	2
2.	Goencho Swabhiman Party			Swapnesh Sherlekar	4	3	1

== Candidates ==
AAP CM candidate Amit Palekar contested from St. Cruz. Former CM and AITC leader Churchill Alemao contested from Benaulim. BJP CM candidate and incumbent CM Pramod Sawant contested from Sanquelim. Former CM and INC leader Digambar Kamat contested from Margao. Former CM Laxmikant Parsekar contested from Mandrem as an independent candidate after he was denied ticket by BJP.

District	Constituency		NDA		UPA		AAP		AITC+	
District	#	Name	Party	Candidate	Party	Candidate	Party	Candidate	Party	Candidate
North Goa	1	Mandrem	BJP	Dayanand Sopte	GFP	Deepak Kalangutkar	AAP	Adv Prasad Shahapurkar	MGP	Jit Arolkar
North Goa	2	Pernem (SC)	BJP	Pravin Arlekar	INC	Jitendra Gaonkar	AAP	Pundalik Dhargalkar	MGP	Ranjan Korgaonkar
North Goa	3	Bicholim	BJP	Rajesh Patnekar	INC	Meghashyam Raut	(Note: AAP didn't field a candidate against Independent candidate Dr. Chandrakant Shetye in Bicholim)		MGP	Naresh Sawal
North Goa	4	Tivim	BJP	Nilkanth Halarnkar	INC	Aman Lotilkar	AAP	Uday Salkar	AITC	Kavita Kandolkar
North Goa	5	Mapusa	BJP	Joshua D'Souza	INC	Sudhir Kandolkar	AAP	Rahul Mhambre	AITC	Tarak M Arolkar
North Goa	6	Siolim	BJP	Dayanand Mandrekar	INC	Delilah Lobo	AAP	Vishnu Naik	AITC	Leao F.P Dias
North Goa	7	Saligao	BJP	Jayesh Salgaonkar	INC	Kedar Naik	AAP	Mario Cordeiro	AITC	Bholanath Ghadi Sakalkar
North Goa	8	Calangute	BJP	Joseph Sequeira	INC	Michael Lobo	AAP	Sudesh Mayekar	AITC	Anthony Menezes
North Goa	9	Porvorim	BJP	Rohan Khaunte	INC	Vikas Prabhudessai	AAP	Ritesh Chodankar	AITC	Sandeep Vazarkar
North Goa	10	Aldona	BJP	Glenn Ticlo	INC	Carlos Alvares Ferreira	AAP	Mahesh Satelkar	AITC	Kiran Kandolkar
North Goa	11	Panaji	BJP	Atanasio Monserrate	INC	Elvis Gomes	AAP	Valmiki Naik		
North Goa	12	Taleigao	BJP	Jennifer Monserrate	INC	Tony Rodrigues	AAP	Cecille Rodrigues	MGP	Subhangi Sawant
North Goa	13	St. Cruz	BJP	Antonio Fernandes	INC	Rodolfo Fernandes	AAP	Amit Palekar	AITC	Victor Gonsalves
North Goa	14	St. Andre	BJP	Francisco Silveira	INC	Anthony L.Fernandes	AAP	Ramrao Wagh	AITC	Jagdish Bhobe
North Goa	15	Cumbarjua	BJP	Janita Madkaikar	INC	Rajesh Faldessai	AAP	Gorakhnath kerkar	AITC	Samil Volvaiker
North Goa	16	Maem	BJP	Premendra Shet	GFP	Santosh Sawant	AAP	Rajesh Kalangutkar	MGP	Pravin Zantye
North Goa	17	Sanquelim	BJP	Pramod Sawant	INC	Dharamesh Saglani	AAP	Manoj Gandhi Amonkar	MGP	Mahadev Khandekar
North Goa	18	Poriem	BJP	Deviya Vishwajit Rane	INC	Ranjit Rane	AAP	Vishwajit K Rane	AITC	Ganpat Gaonkar
North Goa	19	Valpoi	BJP	Vishwajit Pratapsingh Rane	INC	Manisha Usgaonkar	AAP	Satyavijay Naik	MGP	Vishwesh Prabhu
North Goa	20	Priol	BJP	Govind Gaude	INC	Dr Dinesh Jalmi	AAP	Nonu Naik	MGP	Deepak Dhavalikar
North Goa	21	Ponda	BJP	Ravi Naik	INC	Rajesh Verenkar	AAP	Surel Tilve	MGP	Ketan Bhatikar
North Goa	22	Siroda	BJP	Subhash Shirodkar	INC	Tukaram Borkar	AAP	Mahadev Naik	MGP	Sanket Mule
North Goa	23	Marcaim	BJP	Sudesh Bhingi	INC	Lavoo Mamledar	AAP	Gurudas Yesu Naik	MGP	Sudin Dhavalikar
South Goa	24	Mormugao	BJP	Milind Naik	INC	Sankalp Amonkar	AAP	Parshuram Sonurlekar	AITC	Jayesh Shetgaonkar
South Goa	25	Vasco da Gama	BJP	Krishna V Salkar	INC	Carlos Almeida	AAP	Adv Sunil Loran	AITC	Saifulla Khan
South Goa	26	Dabolim	BJP	Mauvin Godinho	INC	Viriato Fernandes	AAP	Premanand Nanoskar	AITC	Mahesh Bhandari
South Goa	27	Cortalim	BJP	Narayan Naik	INC	Olencio Simoes	AAP	Alina Saldanha	AITC	Gilberto Mariano Rodrigues
South Goa	28	Nuvem	BJP	Datta Vishnu Borkar	INC	Aleixo Sequeira	AAP	Dr. Mariano Godinho	AITC	Jose.R.Cabral
South Goa	29	Curtorim	BJP	Anthony Barbosa	INC	Moreno Rebello	AAP	Domnic Gaonkar	AITC	Anthony Alberto Peixito
South Goa	30	Fatorda	BJP	Damodar Naik	GFP	Vijai Sardesai	AAP	Sandesh Telekar	AITC	Seoula Avilia Vas
South Goa	31	Margao	BJP	Manohar Ajgaonkar	INC	Digambar Kamat	AAP	Lincoln Vaz	AITC	Mahesh Amonkar
South Goa	32	Benaulim	BJP	Damodar Bandodkar	INC	Anthony Dias	AAP	Venzy Viegas	AITC	Churchill Alemao
South Goa	33	Navelim	BJP	Ullas Yashwant Tuenkar	INC	Avertano Furtado	AAP	Pratima Coutinho	AITC	Valanka Alemao
South Goa	34	Cuncolim	BJP	Clafasio Dias	INC	Yuri Alemao	AAP	Prashant Naik	AITC	Jorson Fernandes
South Goa	35	Velim	BJP	Savio Rodrigues	INC	Savio D'Silva	AAP	Cruz Silva	AITC	Benjamin Silva
South Goa	36	Quepem	BJP	Chandrakant Kavlekar	INC	Altone D'Costa	AAP	Raul Pereira	AITC	Kanta Gaude
South Goa	37	Curchorem	BJP	Nilesh Cabral	INC	Amit Patkar	AAP	Gabriel Fernandes	MGP	Anand Prabhudessai
South Goa	38	Sanvordem	BJP	Ganesh Gaonkar	INC	Khemlo Sawant	AAP	Anil Gaonkar	MGP	Balaji Gauns
South Goa	39	Sanguem	BJP	Subhash Phal Desai	INC	Prasad Gaonkar	AAP	Abhijeet Dessai	AITC	Rakhi Prabhudessai Naik
South Goa	40	Canacona	BJP	Ramesh Tawadkar	INC	Janardan Bhandari	AAP	Anoop Kudtarkar	AITC	Mahadev Desai

== Campaign ==
=== BJP ===
BJP has launched a movement to collect suggestions, ‘Sankalp Peti’ from all across the state to prepare their manifesto for the Assembly Election. The Sankalp Peti, which is flagged off on December 21, will travel across the state till January 5.

=== INC ===
INC released its manifesto on 4 February 2022. Some of the key promises made are

- Launching NYAY scheme which promises annual income transfer of rupees 72 thousand to each of the poorest families in the state
- Cap the Petrol and Diesel prices at rupees 80 per litre
- 30 percent reservation for women in a government job
- Resumption of mining in a sustainable way
- Congress will resist the three Linear projects and will not allow Goa to become a coal hub
- The Congress will enact a law providing protection to the land rights of locals

=== AAP ===
Arvind Kejriwal gave Guarantees for Goans in his poll campaign based on development and positivity:

- Jobs for Goans
- 1 job per family for unemployed, or ₹3000/month until then
- 80% private jobs reserved for Goans
- ₹5000/month for unemployed in tourism due to COVID
- ₹5000/month for those affected by mining ban
- Skill University
- Better health infrastructure
- Free and Quality education to all
- Form the first corruption free government of Goa

AAP decided to carry out every project with citizen's consent. AAP has also promised to increase the remuneration provided to women in Goa under a state-sponsored scheme and also promised financial assistance to women not covered under it.

=== AITC ===
- Proposed scheme Griha Laxmi Card where ₹5000 will be transferred to a woman in every family of the state. AITC campaign leader Mahua Moitra claimed that 6-8% of total state budget is possible, putting cash in hand and liquidity in system is needed in the depressed situation after COVID-19 pandemic.
- Proposed scheme Yuva Shakti Card which will be a collateral-free pre-approved credit card with a limit up to ₹20 lakh at 4% interest rate to Goan youth in the age group of 18–45 years. This card will allow Goans to take need-based credit for higher education, skill development and starting businesses.
- In proposed scheme Majhe Ghar, Malki Hak Scheme AITC has announced that 50,000 such homeless families, who have been living in Goa since 198 or earlier, will be given subsidized housing. Mamata Banerjee's party has also promised to hand over the land lease to the residents within 250 days of the formation of the AITC-MGP coalition government in Goa. A team of 3,000 volunteers will conduct door-to-door surveys after which 50,000 real homeless families will be found. The AITC-MGP alliance claimed the proposed plan will benefit 80 percent of the residents.
- Proposed scheme Vahan Mitra Scheme offers a subsidy of ₹10,000 for 30,000 taxi drivers and owners.

== Poll predictions ==
=== Opinion polls ===
Polling aggregates
- Active Parties
- National Democratic Alliance
- United Progressive Alliance
- Aam Aadmi Party
- Others

Date Published	Polling agency						Lead
Date Published	Polling agency	NDA	UPA	AAP	AITC+	Others	Lead
7 February 2022	ABP News C-voter	30.0%	23.6%	24.0%	7.7%	14.7	6.0%
23 January 2022	Polstrat-NewsX	35.6%	20.1%	23.4%	20.9%		12.2%
10 January 2022	ABP News C-voter	32%	19.8%	22.5%	7.7%	18.1%	9.5%
21 December 2021	Polstrat-NewsX	32.8%	18.8%	22.1%	26.3%		10.7%
11 December 2021	ABP News C-Voter	30.0%	19.7%	24.4%	25.9%		5.6%
12 November 2021	ABP News C-voter	35.7%	18.6%	23.6%	22.1%		12.1%
8 October 2021	ABP News C-voter	37.5%	18.3%	22.8%	21.4%		14.7%
3 Sept 2021	ABP News C-voter	39.4%	15.4%	22.2%	23%		17.2%

Date Published	Polling agency						Lead	Remarks
Date Published	Polling agency	NDA	UPA	AAP	AITC+	Others	Lead	Remarks
7 February 2022	ABP News C-voter	14-18	10-14	4-8	3-7	0-2	0-8	Hung
23 January 2022	Polstrat-NewsX	21-25	4-6	6-9	2-5		12-19	BJP majority
10 January 2022	ABP News C-voter	19-23	4-8	5-9	2-6	0-4	10-18	Hung
21 December 2021	Polstrat-NewsX	20-22	4-6	5-7	8-9		12-13	Hung
11 December 2021	ABP News C-Voter	17-21	4-8	5-9	6-10		7-15	Hung
12 November 2021	ABP News C-voter	19-23	2-6	3-7	8-12		7-15	Hung
8 October 2021	ABP News C-voter	24-28	1-5	3-7	4-8		16-24	BJP majority
3 Sept 2021	ABP News C-voter	22-26	3-7	4-8	3-7		14-22	BJP majority
10 March 2022	Election results	20	12	2	2	4	8	BJP majority

=== Exit polls ===
The Election Commission banned the media from publishing exit polls between 7 AM on 10 February 2022 and 6:30 PM on 7 March 2022. Violation of the directive would be punishable with two years of imprisonment. Accordingly, these exit polls were published in the evening of 7 March 2022.

Polling agency						Lead	Remarks
Polling agency	NDA	UPA	AAP	AITC+	Others	Lead	Remarks
ABP-CVoter	13-17	12-16	1-5	5-9	0-2	0-1	Hung
India Today - Axis My India	14-18	15-20	0	2-5	0-4	0-6	Hung
India TV CNX	16-22	11-17	0-2	1-2	4-5	10-14	Hung
Republic P-MARQ	13-17	13-17	2-6	2-4	0-4	0	Hung
Times Now-Veto	14	16	4	6		2	Hung
Zee - Design Boxed	13-18	14-19	1-3	2-5	1-3	1-2	Hung
Election results	20	12	2	2	4	8	Hung

== Voter turnout ==
District	Seats	Turnout (%)
North Goa	23	81.15
South Goa	17	78.27
Total	40	79.61

== Results ==
=== Results by alliance and party ===
Vote Share
1. BJP (33.3%)
2. UPA (25.3%)
3. AITC+ (12.8%)
4. RGP (9.81%)
5. AAP (6.77%)
6. Others (12.0%)
Seat Share
1. BJP (50.0%)
2. UPA (30.0%)
3. AAP (5.00%)
4. AITC+ (5.00%)
5. RGP (2.50%)
6. Independent (7.50%)

Alliance	Party	Popular vote			Seats		
Alliance	Party	Votes	%	±pp	Contested	Won	+/−
NDA	Bharatiya Janata Party	316,573	33.31%	▲0.8	40	20	▲7
UPA	Indian National Congress	222,948	23.46%	▼4.9	37	11	▼6
UPA	Goa Forward Party	17,477	1.84%	▼1.7	3	1	▼2
UPA	Total	240,425	25.3%	▼3.1	40	12	▼8
AITC+	All India Trinamool Congress	49,480	5.21%	▲5.2	26	0	Steady
AITC+	Maharashtrawadi Gomantak Party	72,269	7.6%	▼3.7	13	2	▼1
AITC+	Total	121,749	12.81%	▼1.5	39	2	▼1
None	Revolutionary Goans Party	93,255	9.81%	▲9.45	38	1	▲1
None	Aam Aadmi Party	64,354	6.77%	▲0.5	39	2	▲2
NCP+	Nationalist Congress Party	10,846	1.14%	▼1.2	13	0	▼1
NCP+	Shiv Sena	1,726	0.18%	▲0.1	10	0	Steady
NCP+	Total	12,572	1.32%	▼1.0	23	0	▼1
None	Independents	88,902	9.35%			3	Steady
None	Others	1,986	0.21%			0	Steady
None	NOTA	10,629	1.12%				
Total							
Valid votes							
Invalid votes							
Votes cast/ turnout							
Abstentions							
Registered voters							

=== District wise results ===
District	Seats					
District	Seats	NDA	UPA	AAP	TMC+	OTH
North Goa	23	13	6	0	2	2
South Goa	17	7	6	2	0	2
Total	40	20	12	2	2	4

=== Results by constituency ===
District	Constituency		Winner				Runner-up				Margin	
District	Constituency		Candidate	Party	Votes	%	Candidate	Party	Votes	%	Votes	%
North Goa	1	Mandrem	Jit Arolkar	MAG	10,387	35.04	Dayanand Sopte	BJP	9,672	32.63	715	2.41
North Goa	2	Pernem	Pravin Arlekar	BJP	13,063	44.73	Rajan Babuso Korgaonkar	MAG	9,645	33.03	3,418	11.70
North Goa	3	Bicholim	Dr. Chandrakant Shetye	IND	9,608	37.12	Naresh Sawal	MAG	9,290	35.89	318	1.23
North Goa	4	Tivim	Nilkanth Halarnkar	BJP	9,414	39.34	Kavita Kandolkar	AITC	7,363	30.77	2,051	8.57
North Goa	5	Mapusa	Joshua D'Souza	BJP	10,195	44.06	Sudhir Rama Kandolkar	INC	8,548	36.94	1,647	7.12
North Goa	6	Siolim	Delilah Lobo	INC	9,699	38.89	Dayanand Mandrekar	BJP	7,972	31.96	1,727	6.93
North Goa	7	Saligao	Kedar Naik	INC	10,045	44.97	Jayesh Salgaonkar	BJP	8,146	36.47	1,899	8.50
North Goa	8	Calangute	Michael Lobo	INC	9,285	45.09	Joseph Robert Sequeira	BJP	4,306	20.91	4,979	24.18
North Goa	9	Porvorim	Rohan Khaunte	BJP	11,714	55.16	Sandeep Vazarkar	AITC	3,764	17.72	7,950	37.44
North Goa	10	Aldona	Carlos Alvares Ferreira	INC	9,320	41.43	Glenn Ticlo	BJP	7,497	33.33	1,823	8.10
North Goa	11	Panaji	Atanasio Monserrate	BJP	6,787	38.96	Utpal Manohar Parrikar	IND	6,071	34.85	716	4.11
North Goa	12	Taleigao	Jennifer Monserrate	BJP	10,167	43.38	Tony Alfredo Rodrigues	INC	8,126	34.67	2,041	8.71
North Goa	13	St. Cruz	Rodolfo Fernandes	INC	8,841	38.97	Antonio Fernandes	BJP	6,377	28.11	2,464	10.86
North Goa	14	St. Andre	Viresh Borkar	RGP	5,395	33.14	Francisco Silveira	BJP	5,319	32.67	76	0.47
North Goa	15	Cumbarjua	Rajesh Faldessai	INC	6,776	31.44	Janita Pandurang Madkaikar	BJP	3,949	18.32	2,827	13.12
North Goa	16	Maem	Premendra Shet	BJP	7,874	30.89	Santosh Kumar Sawant	GFP	4,738	18.59	3,136	12.30
North Goa	17	Sanquelim	Pramod Sawant	BJP	12,250	47.73	Dharmesh Saglani	INC	11,584	45.13	666	2.60
North Goa	18	Poriem	Deviya Vishwajit Rane	BJP	17,816	60.92	Vishwajit Rane	AAP	3,873	13.24	13,943	47.68
North Goa	19	Valpoi	Vishwajit Pratapsingh Rane	BJP	14,462	53.62	Manoj Parab	RGP	6,377	23.64	8,085	29.98
North Goa	20	Priol	Govind Gaude	BJP	11,019	39.26	Deepak Dhavalikar	MAG	10,806	38.50	213	0.76
North Goa	21	Ponda	Ravi Naik	BJP	7,514	29.12	Ketan Prabhu Bhatikar	MAG	7,437	28.82	77	0.30
North Goa	22	Siroda	Subhash Shirodkar	BJP	8,307	33.18	Mahadev Naik	AAP	6,133	24.50	2,174	8.68
North Goa	23	Marcaim	Sudin Dhavalikar	MAG	13,963	58.86	Sudesh Bhingi	BJP	4,000	16.86	9,963	42.00
South Goa	24	Mormugao	Sankalp Amonkar	INC	9,067	53.68	Milind Naik	BJP	7,126	42.19	1,941	11.49
South Goa	25	Vasco-Da-Gama	Krishna Salkar	BJP	13,118	51.43	Carlos Almeida	INC	9,461	37.09	3,657	14.34
South Goa	26	Dabolim	Mauvin Godinho	BJP	7,594	40.51	Captain Viriato Fernandes	INC	6,024	32.14	1,570	8.37
South Goa	27	Cortalim	Antonio Vas	IND	5,522	23.08	Olencio Simoes	INC	4,344	18.16	1,178	4.92
South Goa	28	Nuvem	Aleixo Sequeira	INC	8,745	40.09	Arvind D'Costa	RGP	4,348	19.93	4,397	20.16
South Goa	29	Curtorim	Aleixo Reginaldo Lourenco	IND	8,960	40.12	Moreno Rebelo	INC	3,905	17.49	5,055	22.63
South Goa	30	Fatorda	Vijai Sardesai	GFP	11,063	45.81	Damu G. Naik	BJP	9,536	39.49	1,527	6.32
South Goa	31	Margao	Digambar Kamat	INC	13,674	60.42	Manohar Ajgaonkar	BJP	5,880	25.98	7,794	34.44
South Goa	32	Benaulim	Venzy Viegas	AAP	6,411	30.36	Churchill Alemao	AITC	5,140	24.34	1,271	6.02
South Goa	33	Navelim	Ulhas Tuenkar	BJP	5,168	24.23	Valanka Natasha Alemao	AITC	4,738	22.21	430	2.02
South Goa	34	Cuncolim	Yuri Alemao	INC	9,866	42.70	Clafasio Dias	BJP	6,632	28.71	3,234	13.99
South Goa	35	Velim	Cruz Silva	AAP	5,390	23.04	D'Silva Savio	INC	5,221	22.32	169	0.72
South Goa	36	Quepem	Altone D'Costa	INC	14,994	52.51	Chandrakant Kavlekar	BJP	11,393	39.90	3,601	12.61
South Goa	37	Curchorem	Nilesh Cabral	BJP	9,973	43.77	Amit Patkar	INC	9,301	40.82	672	2.95
South Goa	38	Sanvordem	Ganesh Gaonkar	BJP	11,877	44.77	Deepak Pauskar	IND	6,687	25.21	5,190	19.56
South Goa	39	Sanguem	Subhash Phal Desai	BJP	8,724	36.73	Savitri Chandrakant Kavlekar	IND	7,295	30.71	1,429	6.02
South Goa	40	Canacona	Ramesh Tawadkar	BJP	9,063	31.11	Isidore Fernandes	IND	6,012	20.64	3,051	10.47

== Government formation ==
BJP became the single largest party with 20 seats in the hung assembly and decided to take support from 2 independents and MGP.

In September 2022, 8 out of 11 MLAs from Congress joined BJP, increasing the strength of BJP to 28 seats in the Goa Legislative Assembly.

== See also ==
- 2022 elections in India
- Elections in Goa
