= Viriato Fernandes =

Indian politician and activist (born 1969)

Captain Viriato Fernandes
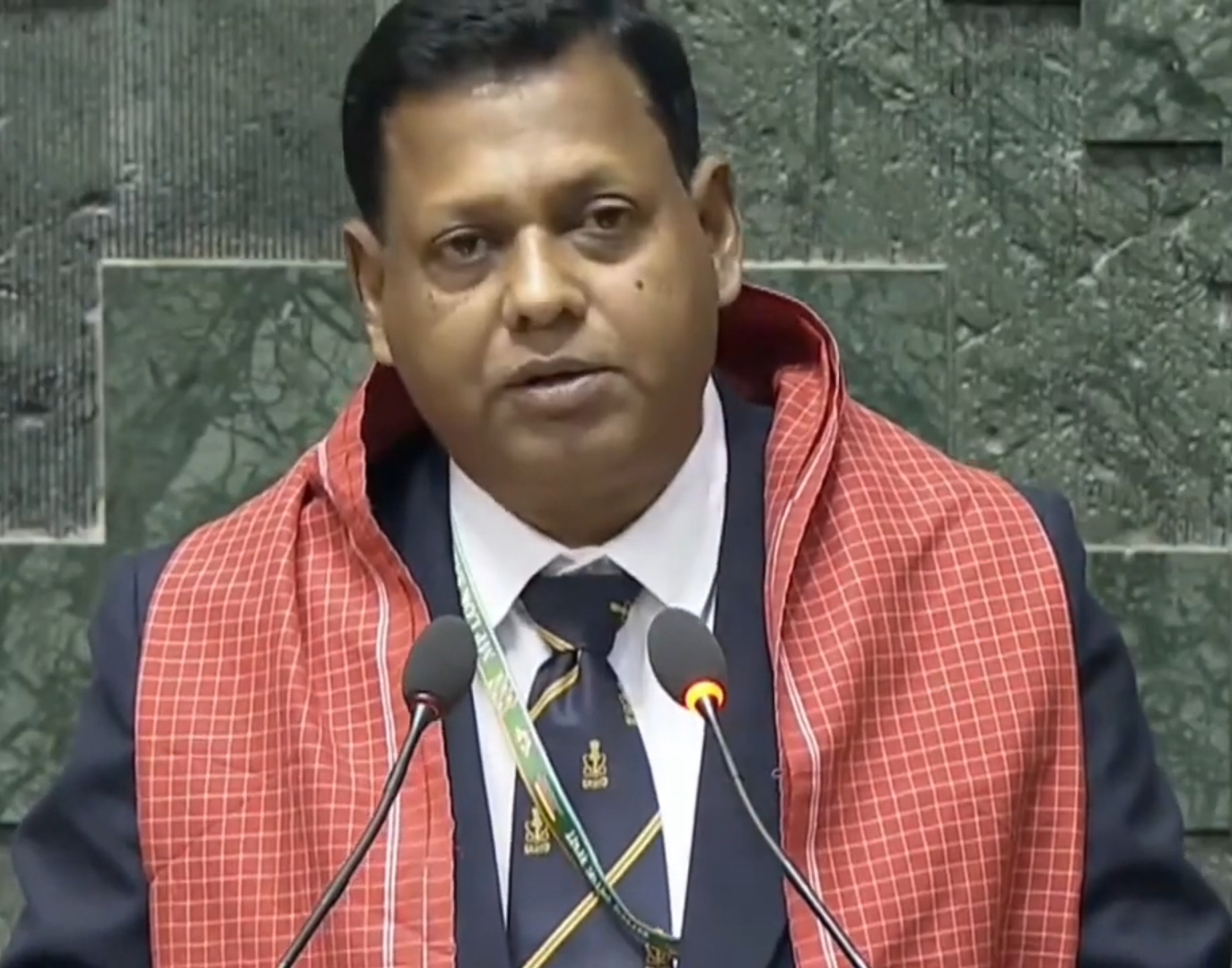
- Fernandes at the 18th Lok Sabha oath taking ceremony at Sansad Bhavan, 2024

Member of Parliament, Lok Sabha
- Incumbent
- Assumed office 9 June 2024
- Preceded by: Francisco Sardinha
- Constituency: South Goa
- Majority: 13,535 (48.35%)

Personal details
- Born: Viriato Hipolito Mendonca Fernandes; 2 February 1969 (age 57) Assonora, Goa, India
- Party: Indian National Congress (since 2021)
- Spouse: Anita Fernandes (m. 1996)
- Children: 1
- Education: Goa Engineering College (B.E.); University of Southampton
- Occupation: Politician; activist; mechanical engineer
- Website: facebook.com/viriatofernandes.captain
- Military career
- Allegiance: India
- Branch: Indian Navy
- Service years: 1991–2017
- Rank: Captain
- Unit: INAS 310; INAS 550
- Conflicts: Kargil War; Operation Talwar
- Awards: Operation Vijay Star; Operation Vijay Medal
- Viriato Fernandes's voice Fernandes taking the oath of office in Konkani. Recorded 24 June 2024

Captain Viriato Hipolito Mendonca Fernandes (born 4 February 1969) is an Indian politician, social activist, mechanical engineer, and former Indian Navy officer who serves as a Member of Parliament, representing South Goa in the Lok Sabha since June 2024. He is a member of the Indian National Congress (INC). During his early years as a navy officer, he was part of Operation Talwar during the Kargil War. After serving 26 years in the Indian Navy, he retired and began activism in the state of Goa, before joining politics in 2021.

== Early life and education ==
Viriato Hipolito Mendonca Fernandes was born on 4 February 1969 in Assonora, Goa, India, to Prudente Fernandes and Viviana de Mendonça Fernandes. He received his early education at St. Clara High School in Assonora, and Don Bosco High School in Panjim. He then went on to earn a Bachelor of Engineering degree from Goa Engineering College in 1992. Later in his career, Fernandes pursued postgraduate studies, obtaining a postgraduate diploma in business administration in operations in 2015 and another in supply chain management in 2017 from an unspecified institution. He also holds a certificate in contract management from the University of Southampton.

== Military career (1991–2017) ==
After completing his undergraduate engineering degree, Fernandes joined the Indian Navy on 12 August 1991. He commenced his naval career at INS Mandovi in Verem, Goa. Subsequently, he was stationed at INS Shivaji in Lonavala, Maharashtra, where he specialized in marine engineering for a span of two years. Following this assignment, he was transferred to INS Ranjit, a Russian destroyer, and later assumed the role of senior engineer aboard INS Anjadip.

Fernandes developed a fascination with aviation over the course of his career. In the early 1990s, he pursued advanced aeronautical training in Cochin, India, with a focus on mastering the piloting of diverse aircraft types, including Chetak helicopters, Sea Harrier jets, and Dornier turboprop planes. After completing this specialized program, Fernandes was appointed as an air engineering officer at INS Hansa, a major Indian naval air station located in Goa. He served with the Indian Navy's INAS 310 squadron, which was colloquially known as "The Cobras". Tensions between India and Pakistan escalated in the late 1990s, leading to Fernandes being deployed to the Indo-Pakistani border region to conduct aerial reconnaissance missions during Pokhran-II. In this capacity, he and his fellow aviators monitored the movements and activities of Pakistani aircraft and military forces.

Around this time, a Dornier aircraft unit was established at Cochin, designated the "Flying Fish". While stationed there, his daughter was born, though the prevailing state of tensions meant he had to leave his young family behind to report for duty during a critical period in early June. The Kargil War that erupted between India and Pakistan involved coordinated operations by all three branches of the Indian armed forces. The Indian Army and Indian Air Force were directly engaged in combat against the infiltrating Pakistani forces, under the codenames Operation Vijay and Operation Safed Sagar, while the Indian Navy conducted supporting naval operations under the name Operation Talwar.

During the Kargil War of 1999 between India and Pakistan, the Indian Navy played a crucial role in establishing a maritime blockade along Pakistan's Arabian Sea coastline. The primary objective of this naval operation was to disrupt the logistical supply of crude oil and other resources from Arab countries to Pakistan, which was supporting Pakistani forces engaged in the conflict. The Indian Navy's air squadron, INAS 550, known as the "Flying Fish", coordinated its efforts with the Indian Air Force during the war. This naval unit's activities, combined with the broader maritime blockade, effectively choked off supplies to Pakistani troops, significantly contributing to their defeat in the Kargil War.

For his service during this conflict, Fernandes, who was a member of INAS 550, received commendations from the Commander-in-Chief of the Western Naval Command in 2001 and 2008, as well as from the Commander-in-Chief of the Southern Naval Command in 2002. In acknowledgment of his contributions during the Kargil War, he was honored with the Operation Vijay Star and Operation Vijay Medal. In addition to his wartime service, Fernandes also experienced the catastrophic tsunami incident in December 2004 while stationed in the Andaman and Nicobar Islands. He continued his naval aviation career until his early retirement in 2017.

== Political career (2021–present) ==
Fernandes was initially involved with the non-governmental organization (NGO) known as Goencho Avaaz (GA). He was a founding member of the group, which was established in April 2018. He went on to serve as the state convener of the same organization. In November 2021, Fernandes ended his involvement with Goencho Avaaz. Prior to his departure, he had intended to contest the 2022 Goa Legislative Assembly election as a candidate for the Goencho Avaaz Party. However, six days after he formally left the group, Goencho Avaaz was registered as a political party under the new name Goencho Swabhiman Party on 16 December of that year.

On 10 December 2021, Fernandes joined the Indian National Congress (INC) in the presence of All India Congress Committee general secretary Priyanka Gandhi. Before becoming a member of the Indian National Congress (INC), he was reportedly engaged in organizing a visit by Gandhi to Goa.

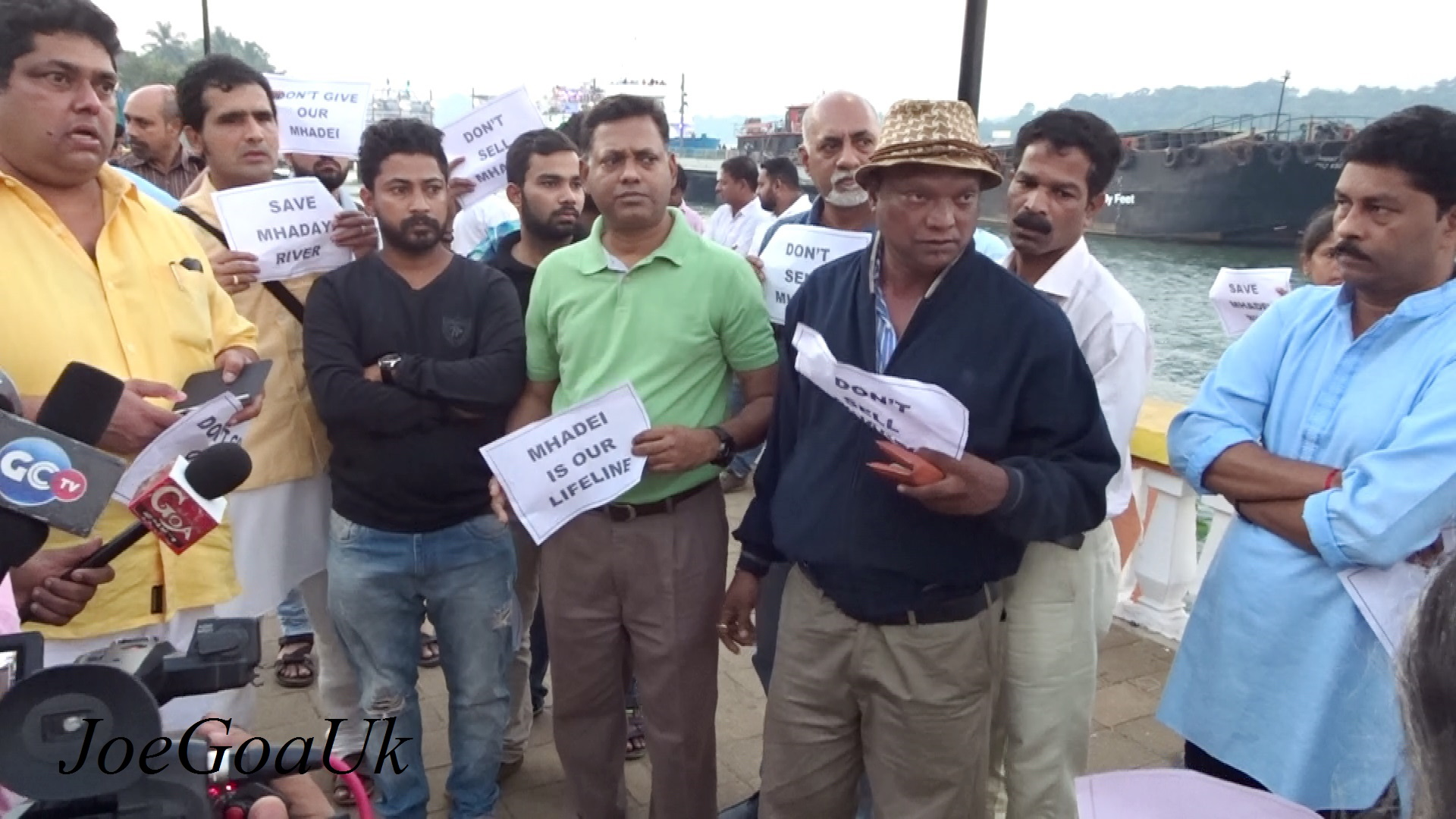
Fernandes during the MWDT protest alongside Manoj Parab and MLA Aleixo Lourenco at Panjim, 2017

In the lead-up to the 2022 Goa Legislative Assembly election, there was discussion surrounding Fernandes' political affiliations and candidacy. In November 2021, the president of the Goa Pradesh Congress Committee (GPCC), Girish Chodankar, raised questions about Fernandes potentially joining the Indian National Congress (INC) party.

Prior to this, Fernandes had been involved with the Goencho Avaaz people's movement. His decision to then join the INC after departing from Goencho Avaaz prompted further scrutiny and reflection from other Goan politicians, including Dr. Jorson Fernandes of Cuncolim. These politicians expressed concerns that the transition of a people's movement leader to a major political party could be problematic, given that the party had incorporated elements that the movement had previously opposed.

Fernandes contested the 2022 Goa Legislative Assembly election as an INC candidate in the Dabolim Assembly constituency. He was defeated by the Bharatiya Janata Party (BJP) candidate Mauvin Godinho, finishing as the runner-up with a margin of 1,570 votes.

== Personal life ==
Fernandes is a resident of Chicalim, a census town located in the state of Goa. In the 2010s, he secured sponsorship from the Indian Navy to acquire a Black Belt certification in Six Sigma management. He was a national-level badminton player and actively participated in cricket and football as well. He is passionate about the natural environment of Goa, which he has described as a "beautiful paradise".

In 2018, Fernandes and his family were planning to relocate to the United Arab Emirates. But after returning from a public event, he changed his mind and decided to stay back to serve and protect Goa. Later that year, he became a founding member of the environmental advocacy group Goencho Avaaz. He enlisted the backing of all 38 non-governmental groups in Goa focused on protecting the state's environmental interests to establish the organization successfully.

=== Marriage and children ===
Fernandes and his partner, Anita Rosaline Fernandes (née Rodrigues), were wed on 8 December 1996. She is a teacher by profession. Approximately two years after their marriage, in 1998, the couple had a daughter while living in Cochin, Kerala, around the time of India's Pokhran-II nuclear tests.

== Positions held ==
- Member of the Standing Committee on Defence (26 September 2024 – present)
