= Viresh Borkar =

Indian politician and activist (born 1993)

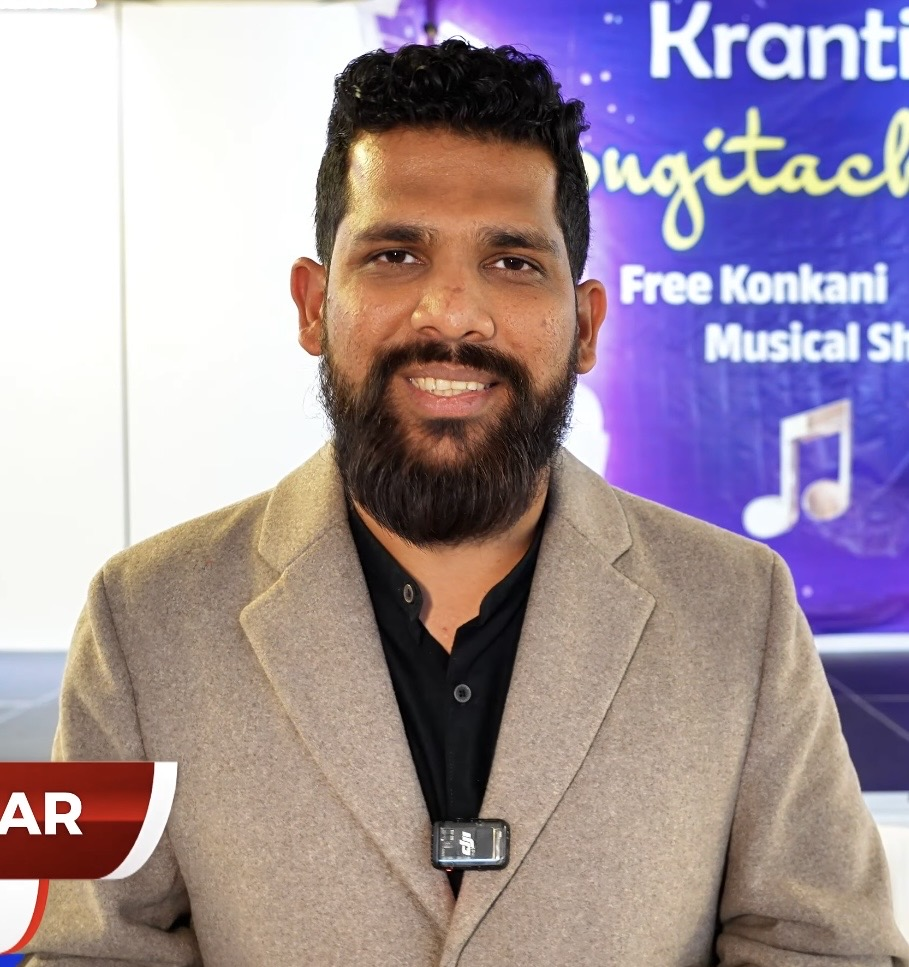
- Borkar in Swindon, UK, in 2026

Member of Goa Legislative Assembly
- Incumbent
- Assumed office 10 March 2022
- Preceded by: Francisco Silveira
- Constituency: St. Andre
- Majority: 5,395 (33.4%)

National President of the Revolutionary Goans Party
- Incumbent
- Assumed office 24 July 2026
- Preceded by: Office established

President of the Revolutionary Goans Party
- In office 24 November 2021 – 2023
- Preceded by: Office established
- Succeeded by: Manoj Parab

Personal details
- Born: Viresh Mukesh Borkar; 29 June 1993 (age 33) Neura, Goa, India
- Party: Revolutionary Goans Party (since 2021)
- Other political affiliations: Aam Aadmi Party (2017–2017)
- Education: Higher Secondary School Certificate
- Occupation: Politician; activist; businessman
- Committees: Government Assurances; Public Undertakings; Rules; Business Advisory; Public Accounts; River Mhadei; Public Universities
- Website: facebook.com/vireshborkar8899
- Viresh Borkar's voice Borkar on receiving a warm reception from Goans in the UK. Recorded 26 January 2026

Viresh Mukesh Borkar (born 29 June 1993) is an Indian politician, activist, and businessman who has served as a member of the Goa Legislative Assembly, representing the St. Andre constituency since 2022. He has served as the national president of the Revolutionary Goans Party (RGP) since July 2026 and is one of the party's co-founders. He previously served as president of the RGP from 2021 to 2023, before being succeeded by Manoj Parab.

== Early life ==
Viresh Mukesh Borkar was born on 29 July 1993 in Neura, Goa, to Mukesh Dattaram Borkar, a farmer, into a Bhandari family. He has an older brother, Nitesh, an automobile engineer-turned-farmer, and a younger brother, Saiesh. Borkar completed his Higher Secondary School Certificate in 2010 from Fr. Agnel's Higher Secondary School, Pilar, Goa. As a student, Borkar participated in the 2011 Indian anti-corruption movement.

Borkar's grandfather, Dattaram Pandhari Borkar, was a first-generation farmer and independence activist who inspired Borkar to follow in his footsteps. In his teenage years, Borkar aspired to pursue a career in business to achieve a comfortable standard of living. After discontinuing his computer diploma studies, Borkar worked in the information technology field before establishing a business in Fatorda that offered computer and mobile repair services, along with CCTV installation. The enterprise was eventually discontinued in 2017 due to market competition from non-Goans. Following this, he was briefly associated with the Aam Aadmi Party.

Borkar later worked at an Apple retail store in Margao to support the activities of the NGO Revolutionary Goans (RG). In 2019, he left the position following encouragement from his grandfather, whom he has described as an influence on his transition into grassroots activism after mentoring him since he was 18. During this period, Borkar also engaged in small-scale sales of items such as clothing and accessories, including T-shirts, caps, and socks, at religious feasts and local festivals across Goa. These included events such as Vasco Saptah, the Bodgeshwar Zatra in Mapusa, and the Navelim Feast, as part of an effort to understand the experiences of Goans involved in the informal trade sector.

Borkar later became involved in farming after receiving training in agriculture. In addition to farming, he undertook community-oriented initiatives that included employment-related projects and public awareness activities. He also voiced concerns regarding illegal commercial operations, land encroachment, and the impact of migration on local employment opportunities in Goa.

== Political career ==
Borkar began his political career as a volunteer for the Aam Aadmi Party (AAP) before the 2017 Goa Legislative Assembly election, where he met future Revolutionary Goans Party (RGP) founder Manoj Parab and future RGP general secretary Vishvesh Naik. He subsequently left within a few months, as he was unhappy with the party’s policies. Together with Parab, Naik, and others, they formed the NGO Revolutionary Goans on 3 March 2017.

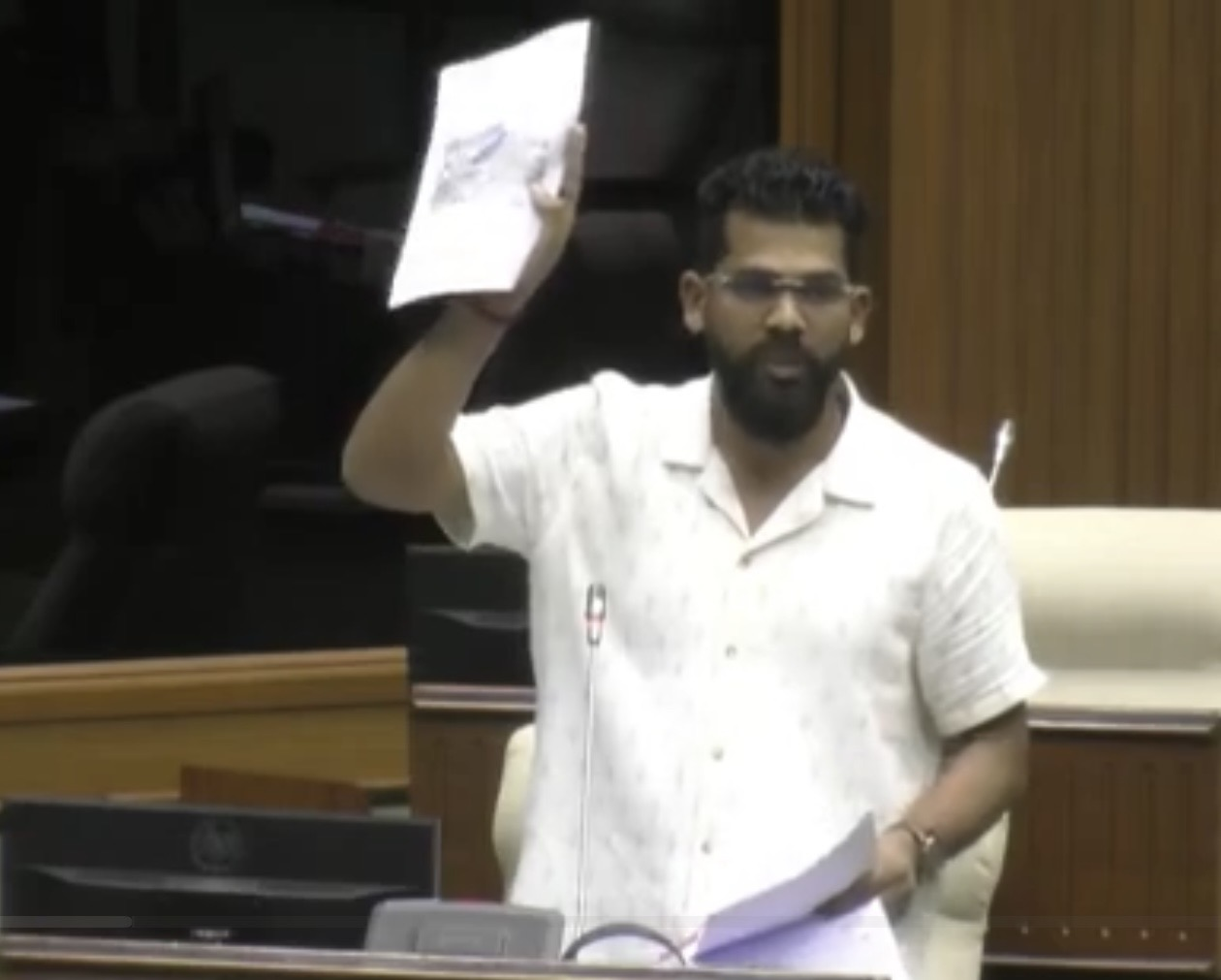
Borkar in 2024

In his electoral debut at the 2022 Goa Legislative Assembly election, Borkar won the RGP's first seat in the assembly by defeating four-time MLA and former sports minister Francisco Silveira of the Bharatiya Janata Party by a margin of 76 votes. He became the youngest legislator (28) to be elected to the assembly since Mauvin Godinho (25) and Victor Gonsalves (27) were elected in 1989.

Borkar claimed he won the election without relying on money power. He was also the only MLA with a net worth of just ₹8 lakh (equivalent to ₹9.3 lakh or US$9,900 in 2026), while all other legislators were crorepatis (millionaires). He drew significant support from voters in the Catholic community. Borkar is a strong advocate for native Goan rights, which align with many of his party’s core policies. He has advocated for issues such as illegal land conversions, road conditions, migrant-related concerns, and the lack of basic amenities within his constituency.

=== Evictions from the House and international travel ===
Borkar first came to the limelight with his introduction of the POGO (Person of Goan Origin) Bill during an Assembly session, which had been one of his party’s core issues prior to the elections. He initially issued a notice in July 2022; however, the Government of Goa deemed it unconstitutional. In July 2025, Borkar moved the private member’s bill again during the Monsoon Assembly session, where it was rejected by members of the ruling party. He was later evicted from the House for seeking a definition of "Goan origin". In 2023, Borkar was marshaled out of the House by the then Speaker of the Goa Legislative Assembly, Ramesh Tawadkar, for protesting over the River Mhadei issue.

In January 2026, Borkar undertook an international study tour to the United Kingdom. The tour also served as an outreach effort to thank his Goan voters and to introduce his party to the Goan diaspora. He visited areas with a significant Goan population, including Swindon, Bridgwater, Southall, Hounslow, Wembley, and Scotland. In Swindon, he notably visited Swindon Borough Council and Swindon Central Library.

=== 2026 indefinite hunger strike ===
In February 2026, Borkar led an indefinite hunger strike opposing the conversion of 84,000 square metres (900,000 sq ft) of land in Palem-Siridao village in his constituency from a non-settlement zone to a settlement zone under the provisions of Section 39-A by the Town and Country Planning (TCP) Department. The protest soon grew, with other opposition leaders and common people supporting Borkar's demands that the provisions of Section 39-A of the TCP Act be scrapped permanently in Goa.

Among those who supported Borkar were fellow opposition legislators Yuri Alemao, Vijai Sardesai, Carlos Alvares Ferreira, Altone D'Costa, Venzy Viegas, and Cruz Silva; environmentalists Claude Alvares and Norma Alvares; and activists and politicians such as Manoj Parab, among others. Borkar ended the hunger strike on the sixth day after the Government of Goa suspended land conversions in his constituency.

== Personal life ==
In April 2020, Borkar, then a member of the NGO Revolutionary Goans (RG), had his Mahindra Thar set on fire by unknown individuals. He subsequently filed a complaint at the Pernem Police Station.

Borkar resides in Wada Bhat, Neura, Goa.

== Positions held ==
- Member of the Committee on Government Assurances (19 January 2023 – present)
- Member of the Committee on Public Undertakings (19 January 2023 – present)
- Member of the Rules Committee (31 May 2022 – present)
- Member of the Budget Committee (31 May 2022 – 24 May 2025)
- Member of the Business Advisory Committee (30 March 2022 – present)
- Member of the Public Accounts Committee
- Member of the House Committee to Study Issues Related To River Mhadei (24 Jan 2023 – present)
- Member of the Select Committee to Study the Goa Public Universities Bill, 2025 (Bill No. 34 of 2025) (25 September 2025 – present)
