= Pirna, Goa =

Pirna
- Village
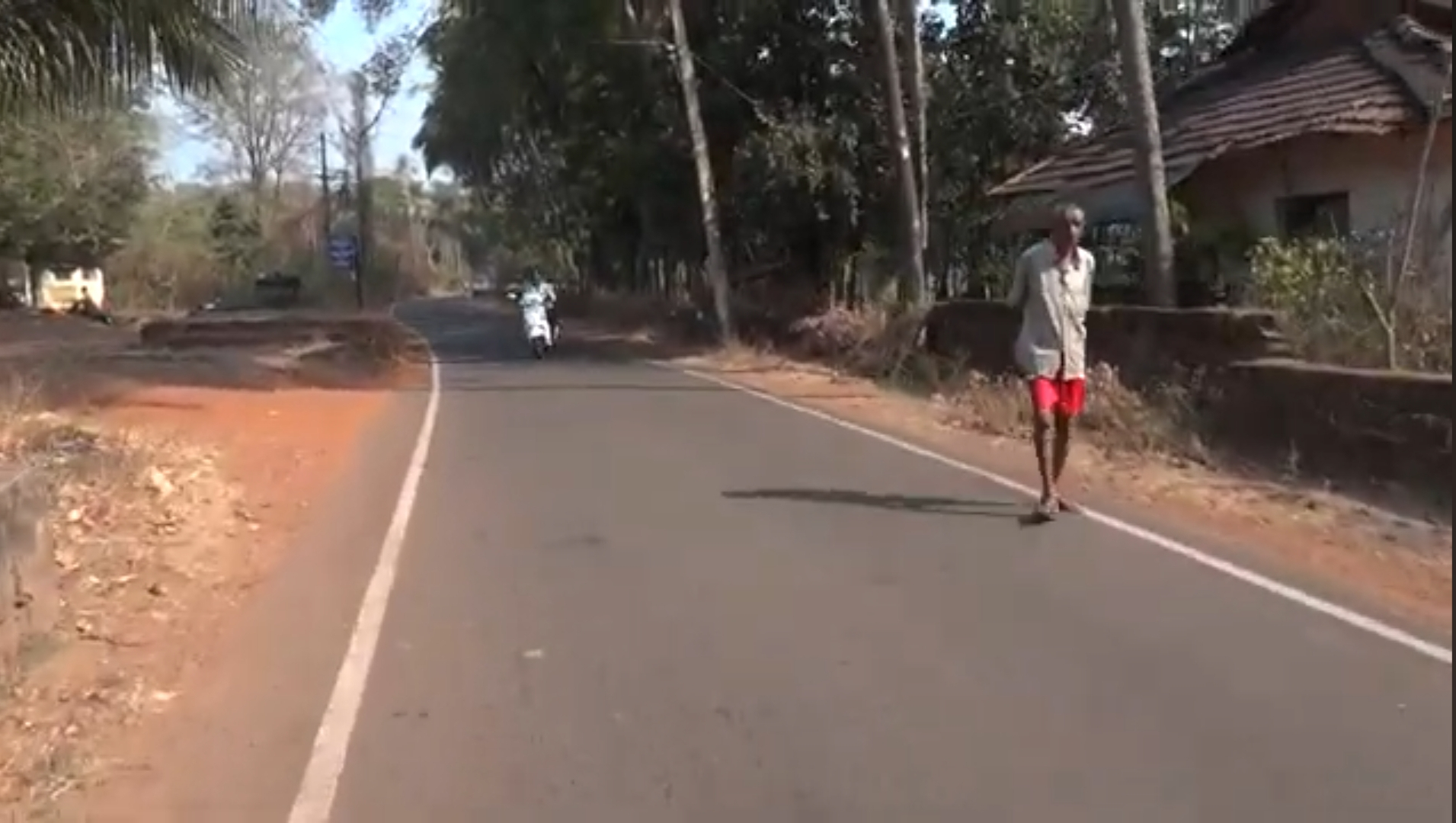
- The main road of Pirna, 2018

- Location in Goa, India Pirna (India)
- Coordinates: 15°40′00″N 73°52′00″E
- Country: India
- State: Goa
- District: North Goa
- Taluka: Bardez

Government
  - Type: Panchayat

Languages
  - Official: Konkani
- Time zone: UTC+5:30 (IST)
- PIN: 403513
- Vehicle registration: GA 03
- Nearest city: Mapusa
- Lok Sabha constituency: North Goa
- Website: goa.gov.in

Pirna is a village in the North Goa sub-district or taluka of Bardez and is located in the northern edge of the sub-district. It is close to the Colvale river and is the home of the 150-metre long Pirna-Ozarim bridge at Thorli Chandai. The bridge connects Pirna in Bardez taluka with Pernem taluka. It was inaugurated in May 2006.

== Location ==
Pirna is bounded on its west by the village of Nadora and Bicholim sub-district of taluka lies on its east. It is near to the Amthane dam, an important water supply project in North Goa.

Since it lies at one end of Bardez, it is surrounded by villages in two different sub-districts -- Mencurem and Advalpal in Bicholim taluka and Ozarim in Pernem taluka. Its neighbouring village of Advalpal in Bicholim is the abode of numerous temples.

This village is located around 28.5 kilometres from the state-capital Panjim or Panaji, and lies in the interiors of Bardez.

For postal purposes, the village is serviced from the nearby town of Colvale.

== Area, population ==
Pirna covers an area of 990.11 hectares and has a total of 632 households. Its population comprises 2,568 persons—1,267 males and 1,301 females. Its under-six population comprises 250 children, of whom 123 were boys and 127 girls, as per the 2011 official Census.

== Geography ==
Pirna has a total of seven panchayat wards or vadde, the typical sub-divisions of a village in Goa. It also has 11 traditional vadde—including Talap, Gaunkar, Dessai, Sutar, Thorli, Chandal, Naik, Mesta, Kel.

== Setting ==
Pirna has a canopy of green covering it—coconut palms, cashew plantations and rice paddy fields. It is home to water bodies and old temples.

== Culture ==
Pirna has gained fame for excelling at the all-India level for its Marathi plays (nataks) which were produced by the local Astha Gandha Society.

Hanumant Kambli, the Goan artist and art professor, hails from Pirna, though currently based at Ribandar. Other persons from the area include former opening batsman for India and Bombay Ranji team ex-captain Sudhir Naik, nephrologist-renal specialist Dr Arun Halarnkar,

Other notable persons connected to the village and residents include poet-RJ Sangam Bhonsule, Marathi singer Kishor Dessai, tabla maker Pandurang Parab, freedom fighters, poet Govind Shantaram Sinai Bhonsule, social activist Manoj Parab who founded the Revolutionary Goans Party, among others.

== Shrines ==
Pirna's church is dedicated to St. Francis Xavier and was elevated as a parish in 1962. It is located in Mesta Vaddo, and was originally built in 1792 as a chapel. It is affiliated to the Our Lady of Victory Church at Revora.

Shantadurga Temple at Talap Vaddo has a seven-day bhajan saptah (festival of bhajans) held after Diwali. Hanuman temple is four-and-half centuries old and locateda t Thorli Chandei. Its festivals are in March-April. The Shiva temple at Tirthacho Mulo is near a waterfall which surfaced there after 42 years in 2001–02. The Shri Rashtroli Brahman Temple lies in the area.

== Convents and schools ==
Pirna is also home to the Gerosa Convent, run by the Maria Bambian Sisters (SCCG). The Shantadurga Higher Secondary School was set up in 1996 and Shree Shantadurga Vidyalaya in 1963 at Talap Vaddo, and runs classes from Std I to XII, in the English medium. Its higher secondary offers education in the Arts and Commerce streams.

== Milk society ==
The Pirna Dudh (Milk) Society is a centre of economic activity, based out of Talap Vaddo. It collects milk from about 70 villages and provides about 1600 litres of milk daily to the centralised network of the Goa Dairy, according to journalist Isidore Domnick Mendis.

== Issues ==
In 2017, villagers were noted as raising issues of poor electricity supply to the village.
