= Politics of Goa =

The key political players in Goa state in Western India are the Bharatiya Janata Party, Indian National Congress, Aam Aadmi Party, Maharashtrawadi Gomantak Party, Goa Forward Party and Revolutionary Goans Party. It also has the presence of Nationalist Congress Party, Shiv Sena (2022–present) and Trinamool Congress.

== National politics ==
There are only 2 Lok Sabha (lower house of the Indian Parliament) constituencies in Goa.

== State politics ==
The Goa Legislative Assembly has 40 seats.

== Local politics ==
The state of Goa has two district councils or Zilla Parishads, comprising the rural areas of North Goa district and South Goa district. Each Zilla Parishad has a total of 25 seats. The latest elections to these councils were held on 20 December 2025.

The elected members of the two district councils as per the latest elections are mentioned below.

=== North Goa Zilla Parishad ===
Chairperson: Reshma Bandodkar
Deputy Chairperson: Namdev Chari
No.	Constituency	Councillor	Party	Alliance	Remarks
1	Arambol	Radhika Palekar	Independent	None	
2	Morjim	Tara Hadfadkar	Maharashtrawadi Gomantak Party	NDA	
3	Dhargal	Shrikrishna Harmalkar	Bharatiya Janata Party	NDA	
4	Torxem	Siddhesh Pednekar	Bharatiya Janata Party	NDA	
5	Siolim	Maheshwar Govekar	Bharatiya Janata Party	NDA	
6	Colvale	Kavita Kandolkar	Independent	None	
7	Aldona	Maria Menezes	Indian National Congress	INDIA	
8	Sirsai	Nilesh Kambli	Indian National Congress	INDIA	
9	Anjuna	Narayan Mandrekar	Bharatiya Janata Party	NDA	
10	Calangute	Franzilia Rodrigues	Bharatiya Janata Party	NDA	
11	Socorro	Amit Asnodkar	Bharatiya Janata Party	NDA	
12	Reis–Magos	Reshma Bandodkar	Bharatiya Janata Party	NDA	
13	Penha-de Franca	Sandeep Salgaonkar	Bharatiya Janata Party	NDA	
14	St. Cruz	Esparanka Braganca	Revolutionary Goans Party	None	
15	Taleigao	Raguvir Kuncolencar	Bharatiya Janata Party	NDA	
16	Chimbel	Gauri Kamat	Bharatiya Janata Party	NDA	
17	Corlim	Siddesh Naik	Bharatiya Janata Party	NDA	
18	St. Lawrence	Trupti Bakal	Revolutionary Goans Party	None	
19	Latambarcem	Padmakar Malik	Bharatiya Janata Party	NDA	
20	Karapur–Sarvan	Mahesh Sawant	Bharatiya Janata Party	NDA	
21	Maem	Kunda Mandrekar	Bharatiya Janata Party	NDA	
22	Pale	Sundhar Naik	Bharatiya Janata Party	NDA	
23	Honda	Namdev Chari	Bharatiya Janata Party	NDA	
24	Querim	Nilesh Parwar	Bharatiya Janata Party	NDA	
25	Nagargao	Premnath Dalvi	Bharatiya Janata Party	NDA	

=== South Goa Zilla Parishad ===
Chairperson: Siddharth Desai
Deputy Chairperson: Anjali Velip
No.	Constituency	Councillor	Party	Alliance	Remarks
1	Usgao–Ganje	Sameksha Naik	Bharatiya Janata Party	NDA	
2	Betqui–Candola	Sunil Jalmi	Independent	None	
3	Curti	Pritesh Gaonkar	Bharatiya Janata Party	NDA	
4	Veling–Priol	Aditi Gaude	Maharashtrawadi Gomantak Party	NDA	
5	Queula	Ganapat Naik	Maharashtrawadi Gomantak Party	NDA	
6	Borim	Poonam Samant	Bharatiya Janata Party	NDA	
7	Siroda	Gauri Shirodkar	Bharatiya Janata Party	NDA	
8	Raia	Inacina Pinto	Goa Forward Party	INDIA	
9	Nuvem	Anthony Braganza	Indian National Congress	INDIA	
10	Colva	Antonio Fernandes	Aam Aadmi Party	None	
11	Velim	Julio Fernandes	Indian National Congress	INDIA	
12	Benaulim	Luiza Rodrigues	Indian National Congress	INDIA	
13	Davorlim	Floriano Fernandes	Indian National Congress	INDIA	
14	Guirdolim	Sanjay Velip	Indian National Congress	INDIA	
15	Curtorim	Astra Da Silva	Indian National Congress	INDIA	
16	Navelim	Malifa Cardozo	Indian National Congress	INDIA	
17	Sanvordem	Mohan Gaonkar	Bharatiya Janata Party	NDA	
18	Dharbandora	Rupesh Dessai	Bharatiya Janata Party	NDA	
19	Rivona	Rajeshree Gaonkar	Bharatiya Janata Party	NDA	
20	Xeldem	Siddharth Desai	Bharatiya Janata Party	NDA	
21	Barcem	Anjali Velip	Bharatiya Janata Party	NDA	
22	Cola	Sumitra Pagi	Indian National Congress	INDIA	
23	Poinguinim	Ajita Loliencar	Bharatiya Janata Party	NDA	
24	Sancoale	Sunil Gawas	Bharatiya Janata Party	NDA	
25	Cortalim	Merciana Mendes	Independent	None	

== See also ==
- Goa Legislative Assembly
