= Kalasa-Banduri Nala project =

The Kalasa-Banduri Nala is a project undertaken by the Government of Karnataka to improve drinking water supply to the Districts of Belagavi, Bagalkot, Dharwad and Gadag. It involves building across Kalasa and Banduri, two tributaries of the Mahadayi river to divert 7.56 TMC of water to the Malaprabha river, which supplies the drinking water needs of the said 4 districts, i.e., Dharwad, Belagavi Bagalkot and Gadag. This project had been on paper for decades and the Karnataka government decided to implement it during S M Krishna's regime. Clearance for the project was received from the center in 2002. The project however, soon ran into trouble when the then Bharatiya Janata Party (BJP) government of Goa headed by Manohar Parrikar raised objections to the project claiming that the project would harm Goa's flora and fauna. Following this, the then National Democratic Alliance (NDA) government which was in power at the center put on hold its approval and funding of the project.

Karnataka and Goa have since then been at loggerheads over the project. The project which had been put in abeyance for four years was revived after H. D. Kumaraswamy became the Chief Minister. In September 2006, the coalition government in Karnataka headed by Chief Minister H. D. Kumaraswamy decided to go ahead with the construction work. It was inaugurated on 22 September at Kanakumbi in Khanapur Taluk of Belgaum District. The Goa government, however, soon moved the courts and brought a stay on the construction work. The matter is now before the Mahadayi Water Disputes Tribunal.

Protest to Implement the Project
Communist Party of India (Marxist) organized a rally in Belagavi on 16 September 2015 to implement this long time-pending project. CPI(M) State Secretary GV Srirama Reddy along with his colleague Swamy, Varalaxmi and district secretary G.M. Jaine Khan lead this rally. GV Srirama Reddy said "The present imbroglio on the projects to the long pursued politics between the Congress and the BJP in Karnataka and Goa." Srirama Reddy was critical of Prime Minister Narendra Modi for throwing the ball in the courts of Congress instead of taking a lead to resolve the dispute: "It is unbecoming of a Prime Minister to take a political stand based on his political differences with Congress on an issue concerning people." A statewide bandh was organized by pro-Kannada organizations on Sept 26, 2015 demanding the implementation of the project. The agitation in the malaprabha catchment area under various organisations has now reached 265 days.

Present status of the Project
Central Water Commission has approved the DPR (Detailed Project Report) submitted by Karnataka as on 29th December 2022. Karnataka has received the green signal to divert 2.18 tmc (61.8 Mcum) of Mahadayi river at the proposed Banduri Dam, and 1.72 tmc (48.7 Mcum) of the water at the proposed Kalasa Dam.
