= Dabolim Assembly constituency =

Legislative Assembly constituency in Goa State, India

Coordinates: 15.39°N 73.85°E

Dabolim
- Constituency No. 26 for the Goa Legislative Assembly

Constituency details
- Country: India
- Region: Western India
- State: Goa
- District: South Goa
- Lok Sabha constituency: South Goa
- Established: 1977
- Total electors: 24,661
- Reservation: None

Member of Legislative Assembly
- 8th Goa Legislative Assembly
- Incumbent Mauvin Godinho
- Party: Bharatiya Janata Party

Dabolim Assembly constituency is one of the 40 Goa Legislative Assembly constituencies of the state of Goa in southern India. Dabolim is also one of the 20 constituencies falling under the South Goa Lok Sabha constituency.

== Members of Legislative Assembly ==
Year	Member	Party
1977	Shankar Laad	Maharashtrawadi Gomantak Party
1980	Douradao Narculano Luis	Indian National Congress
1984	D'Souza Simon Peter	Indian National Congress
2012	Mauvin Godinho	Indian National Congress
2017	Mauvin Godinho	Bharatiya Janata Party
2022	Mauvin Godinho	Bharatiya Janata Party

== Election results ==
=== 2027 Assembly election ===
2027 Goa Legislative Assembly election: Dabolim
Party	Candidate	Votes	%	±%
INC				
NDA				
NOTA	None of the above			
Majority				
Turnout				
gain from		Swing		

=== Assembly Election 2022 ===
2022 Goa Legislative Assembly election : Dabolim
Party	Candidate	Votes	%	±%
BJP	Mauvin Godinho	7,594	40.29	▼1.11
INC	Viriato Fernandes	6,024	31.96	▲16.21
AAP	Premanand Nanoskar	2,533	13.44	▲7.05
RGP	Gajanan Borkar	1,129	5.99	New
NCP	Jose Filipe De Sousa	1,037	5.50	▼0.47
NOTA	None of the Above	198	1.05	▲0.09
AITC	Mahesh Bhandari	159	0.84	New
Margin of victory		1,570	8.33	▼5.94
Turnout		18,848	75.21	▼0.72
Registered electors		24,661		▲8.88
BJP hold		Swing	▼1.11	

=== Assembly Election 2017 ===
2017 Goa Legislative Assembly election : Dabolim
Party	Candidate	Votes	%	±%
BJP	Mauvin Godinho	7,234	41.40	New
MGP	Premanand Nanoskar	4,740	27.13	▼15.53
INC	Francisco Jose Nunes	2,752	15.75	▼33.08
AAP	Vasant (Gopi) Naik	1,117	6.39	New
NCP	Kritesh Naik Gaunkar	1,043	5.97	New
NOTA	None of the Above	168	0.96	New
Independent	Kenneth Ian Stewart Silveira	130	0.74	New
Independent	Tara Govind Kerkar	124	0.71	New
Margin of victory		2,494	14.27	▲8.10
Turnout		17,473	77.14	▼0.09
Registered electors		22,650		▲14.39
BJP gain from INC		Swing	▼7.43	

=== Assembly Election 2012 ===
2012 Goa Legislative Assembly election : Dabolim
Party	Candidate	Votes	%	±%
INC	Mauvin Godinho	7,468	48.83	▲11.44
MGP	Premanand Nanoskar	6,524	42.66	▲24.82
AITC	Pratap Mardolkar	849	5.55	New
Independent	Simon D'Souza	433	2.83	New
Margin of victory		944	6.17	▼11.00
Turnout		15,293	77.14	▲10.59
Registered electors		19,801		▼15.87
INC hold		Swing	▲11.44	

=== Assembly Election 1984 ===
1984 Goa, Daman and Diu Legislative Assembly election : Dabolim
Party	Candidate	Votes	%	±%
INC	D'Souza Simon Peter	5,865	37.39	New
Independent	Dourado Herculano Teodoro	3,171	20.22	New
MGP	Naik Mahadev Narayan	2,799	17.84	▼2.67
Independent	Salgaonkar Shankar Kashinath	1,615	10.30	New
Independent	Saldanha Matandy	1,412	9.00	New
BJP	Arlekar Vishwanath Narsoba	187	1.19	New
CPI(M)	Perriera Luisa Geraldo	112	0.71	▼0.43
Margin of victory		2,694	17.17	▼9.55
Turnout		15,686	64.61	▲1.08
Registered electors		23,537		▲26.12
INC gain from INC(U)		Swing	▼9.85	

=== Assembly Election 1980 ===
1980 Goa, Daman and Diu Legislative Assembly election : Dabolim
Party	Candidate	Votes	%	±%
INC(U)	Douradao Narculano Luis	5,780	47.24	New
MGP	Bandekar Shankar Vishnu	2,510	20.51	▼17.99
Independent	Salgaonkar Shankar Kashinath	2,474	20.22	New
JP	Parulekar Prakash Dattaram	464	3.79	▼13.50
JP(S)	Fernandes Nalson Lourence	338	2.76	New
CPI(M)	Mandrekar Sitaram Saulo	140	1.14	New
Independent	Henriques Gandhi Eustacio	132	1.08	New
Margin of victory		3,270	26.72	▲19.02
Turnout		12,236	63.56	▲9.45
Registered electors		18,663		▲31.90
INC(U) gain from MGP		Swing	▲8.73	

=== Assembly Election 1977 ===
1977 Goa, Daman and Diu Legislative Assembly election : Dabolim
Party	Candidate	Votes	%	±%
MGP	Laad Shankar Vishveswar	3,057	38.51	New
INC	Dourado Herculano Teodoro	2,445	30.80	New
JP	Fernandes Nalson Lourence	1,373	17.29	New
Independent	Saldnaha Jose Mathany Jacinte	650	8.19	New
Independent	Shaik Mohamad Jaffar Salia	201	2.53	New
Independent	Karmali Subash Naraina	111	1.40	New
Margin of victory		612	7.71	
Turnout		7,939	55.39	
Registered electors		14,149		
MGP win (new seat)				

== See also ==
- List of constituencies of the Goa Legislative Assembly
- South Goa district
