= Nilkant Halarnkar =

Indian politician

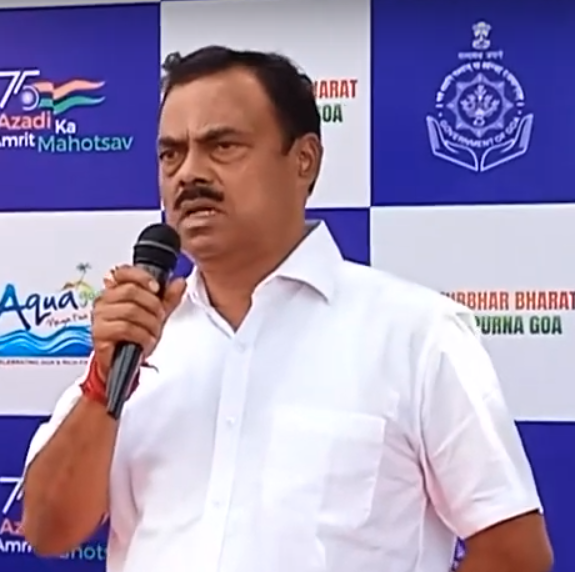
- Halarnkar in 2024

Minister of Fisheries of Goa
- Incumbent
- Assumed office 9 April 2022
- Appointed by: P. S. Sreedharan Pillai
- Chief Minister: Pramod Sawant
- Preceded by: Babu Kavlekar

Minister of Factories and Boilers of Goa
- Incumbent
- Assumed office 9 April 2022
- Appointed by: P. S. Sreedharan Pillai
- Chief Minister: Pramod Sawant
- Preceded by: Babu Kavlekar

Minister of Animal Husbandry and Veterinary Services of Goa
- Incumbent
- Assumed office 9 April 2022
- Appointed by: P. S. Sreedharan Pillai
- Chief Minister: Pramod Sawant
- Preceded by: Mauvin Godinho

Member of the Goa Legislative Assembly
- Incumbent
- Assumed office 2017
- Preceded by: Kiran Kandolkar
- Constituency: Tivim
- In office 2007–2012
- Preceded by: Sadanand Tanavade
- Succeeded by: Kiran Kandolkar

Nilkant Halarnkar is an Indian politician who was elected to the Goa Legislative Assembly from Tivim in the 2007 Goa Legislative Assembly election as a member of the Nationalist Congress Party, 2017 Goa Legislative Assembly election as a member of the Indian National Congress and 2022 Goa Legislative Assembly election as a member of the Bharatiya Janata Party. He was one of the ten members of Indian National Congress who joined Bharatiya Janata Party in July 2019.
