= Porvorim Assembly constituency =

Legislative Assembly constituency in Goa State, India

Coordinates: 15.54°N 73.83°E

Porvorim
- Constituency No. 9 for the Goa Legislative Assembly

Constituency details
- Country: India
- Region: Western India
- State: Goa
- District: North Goa
- Lok Sabha constituency: North Goa
- Established: 2008
- Total electors: 27,097
- Reservation: None

Member of Legislative Assembly
- 8th Goa Legislative Assembly
- Incumbent Rohan Khaunte
- Party: Bharatiya Janata Party

Porvorim Assembly constituency is one of the 40 Legislative Assembly constituencies of Goa state in India. Porvorim is also one of the 20 constituencies falling under North Goa Lok Sabha constituency.

It is part of North Goa district.

== Members of Legislative Assembly ==
Year	Member	Party
2012	Rohan Khaunte	Independent
2017	Rohan Khaunte	Independent
2022	Rohan Khaunte	Bharatiya Janata Party

== Election results ==
=== 2027 Assembly election ===
2027 Goa Legislative Assembly election: Porvorim
Party	Candidate	Votes	%	±%
INC				
NDA				
NOTA	None of the above			
Majority				
Turnout				
gain from		Swing		

=== Assembly Election 2022 ===
2022 Goa Legislative Assembly election : Porvorim
Party	Candidate	Votes	%	±%
BJP	Rohan Khaunte	11,714	55.06%	▲19.65
AITC	Sandeep Vazarkar	3,764	17.69%	New
INC	Vikas Ramchandra Prabhudesai	3,595	16.90%	New
AAP	Ritesh Chodankar	1,535	7.22%	▲2.91
NOTA	None of the Above	473	2.22%	▲1.33
NCP	Shankar Phadte	156	0.73%	New
Margin of victory		7,950	37.37%	▲15.93
Turnout		21,275	76.63%	▼2.22
Registered electors		27,097		▲11.30
BJP gain from Independent		Swing	▼1.79	

=== Assembly Election 2017 ===
2017 Goa Legislative Assembly election : Porvorim
Party	Candidate	Votes	%	±%
Independent	Rohan Khaunte	11,174	56.85%	New
BJP	Guruprasad R. Pawaskar	6,961	35.41%	▼5.62
AAP	Rajesh Valvaikar	846	4.30%	New
MGP	Rajesh Vishnu Sinai Amonkar Alias Rajesh Amonkar	222	1.13%	New
NOTA	None of the Above	176	0.90%	New
Independent	Wilbur Fredrick Ticlo	144	0.73%	New
Samajwadi Janata Party (ChandraShekhar)	Raju Dsouza	133	0.68%	▼0.13
Margin of victory		4,213	21.43%	▲16.21
Turnout		19,656	80.74%	▼0.52
Registered electors		24,346		▲14.79
Independent hold		Swing	▲10.59	

=== Assembly Election 2012 ===
2012 Goa Legislative Assembly election : Porvorim
Party	Candidate	Votes	%	±%
Independent	Rohan Khaunte	7,972	46.26%	New
BJP	Govind Parvatkar	7,071	41.03%	New
NCP	Fermeena P. Khaunte	1,217	7.06%	New
Independent	Umesh Sukha Narvekar	232	1.35%	New
Samajwadi Janata Party (ChandraShekhar)	Raju D'Souza	139	0.81%	New
Margin of victory		901	5.23%	
Turnout		17,234	78.41%	
Registered electors		21,209		
Independent win (new seat)				

== See also ==
- List of constituencies of the Goa Legislative Assembly
- North Goa district
