= Francisco Silveira =

Indian politician (born 1968)

Member of Goa Legislative Assembly
- In office 2017–2022
- Preceded by: Vishnu Wagh
- Succeeded by: Viresh Borkar
- Constituency: St. Andre

Personal details
- Born: Francisco Manuel Silveira; 12 April 1968 (age 58) Agaçaim, Goa, India
- Party: Bharatiya Janata Party (2019–present)
- Other political affiliations: Indian National Congress (till 2019)
- Education: Higher Secondary School Certificate
- Profession: Businessman

Francisco Manuel Silveira (born 12 April 1968) is an Indian politician and businessman who was elected to the Goa Legislative Assembly from St. Andre in the 1999, 2002, 2007, 2017 Goa Legislative Assembly election as a member of the Indian National Congress. He was one of the ten members of Indian National Congress who joined Bharatiya Janata Party in July 2019.
