= Rohan Khaunte =

Indian politician (born 1974)

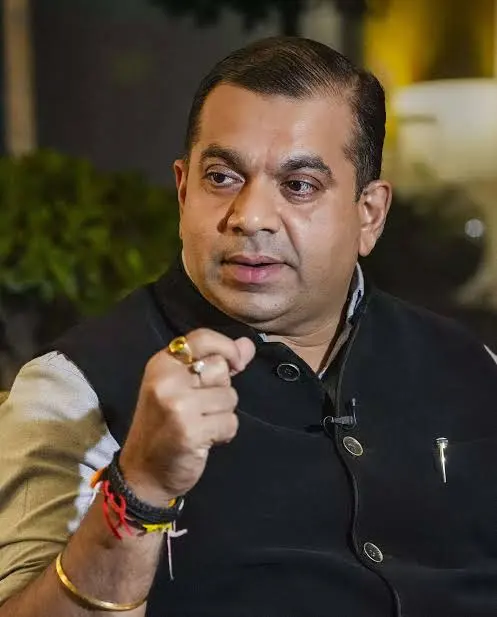
- Khaunte in 2013

Minister for Tourism, IT, E&C, Printing & Stationery

Cabinet Minister to the Government of Goa
- Incumbent
- Assumed office March 2022

Member of the Goa Legislative Assembly
- Incumbent
- Assumed office 2012
- Preceded by: Constituency established
- Constituency: Porvorim

Personal details
- Born: 25 February 1974 (age 52) Goa, India
- Party: Bharatiya Janata Party (since 2021)
- Other political affiliations: Independent (2012–2021)
- Occupation: Politician; philanthropist
- Website: rohankhaunte.com

Rohan Ashok Khaunte is an Indian politician serving as a Cabinet Minister in the Government of Goa. He currently holds the portfolios of Tourism, Information Technology, Electronics & Communications, and Printing & Stationery. He has represented the Porvorim constituency in the Goa Legislative Assembly since 2012 and is among the few politicians in Goa to have been elected three consecutive times from the same constituency.

Prior to joining the Bharatiya Janata Party (BJP) in 2022, Khaunte served as an independent Member of the Legislative Assembly (MLA) for a decade and was recognised for his legislative performance and constituency development initiatives.

== Early life ==
Rohan Ashok Khaunte was born on 25 February 1974 to Ashok Khaunte and Sunanda Khaunte in Panaji, Goa. He graduated as an Electronics Engineer from Goa University. In his college days, Khaunte participated in extracurricular activities as well as in academics, representing Goa in cricket, basketball at the national Level, and table Tennis at the university level. He is involved in his family business which was founded by his father. He was awarded the Young Entrepreneur Award by the then Governor of Goa, Kidar Nath Sahani in 2003.

Before embarking on his political career, Khaunte worked on building the Shiv Samarth Group, a business entity employing hundreds of Goans. Since his early youth, he believed in the importance of "being in the system to change the system". After spending time on the grassroot level, Khaunte decided to enter politics in 2012 and won in the State Assembly Elections.

== Political career ==
Rohan A. Khaunte entered electoral politics in 2012 when he was elected to the Goa Legislative Assembly from the Porvorim constituency as an independent candidate. He was re-elected in 2017 and became one of the few Independent legislators in Goa to secure consecutive electoral victories.

Ahead of the 2022 Goa Legislative Assembly election, Khaunte joined the Bharatiya Janata Party (BJP) and was elected for a third consecutive term from Porvorim.

During his legislative career, he has been recognised for his participation in Assembly proceedings and constituency development initiatives. He is a recipient of the National Youth Ideal Legislator Award.

Year	Constituency	Party	Result
2012	Porvorim	Independent	Elected
2017	Porvorim	Independent	Re-elected
2022	Porvorim	BJP	Re-elected

== Ministerial Career ==
Khaunte first served as Minister for Information Technology, Labour and Employment in the Government of Goa between 2017 and 2019.

Following the 2022 Goa Legislative Assembly election, he was inducted into the cabinet of Chief Minister Pramod Sawant and currently holds the portfolios of Tourism, Information Technology, Electronics & Communications, and Printing & Stationery.

== Key Reforms as Minister for Goa Tourism ==
As Tourism Minister, Khaunte has led initiatives aimed at diversifying Goa's tourism sector through the "Goa Beyond Beaches" vision, promoting cultural, spiritual, regenerative, wellness, hinterland, wedding and MICE tourism.

During his tenure, the Department of Tourism established partnerships with organisations including Airbnb, Mastercard, Agoda, MakeMyTrip, Fly91, Temple Connect, Ironman and the All India Institute of Ayurveda to strengthen destination promotion, tourism entrepreneurship, wellness tourism and aviation connectivity.

He has overseen the promotion of cultural festivals such as Carnival, Shigmo, São João, Bonderam, Chikhal Kalo and Raponkarache Fest, as well as the development of the Ekadasha Teertha Circuit connecting prominent temples across Goa.

Tourism infrastructure initiatives undertaken during his tenure include projects under the Swadesh Darshan Scheme, destination development projects at Colva and Mayem, visitor enhancements around the Basilica of Bom Jesus, and the proposed Chhatrapati Shivaji Maharaj Digital Museum.

The department also introduced initiatives including the Tourist Police Unit, Pink Force, the 24-hour Tourism Helpline (1364), and digital visitor support platforms to improve tourist safety and visitor services.

== Key reforms as Goa Minister for IT ==
As Minister for Information Technology, Khaunte has overseen initiatives focused on digital governance, innovation, startup development and digital infrastructure.

The Goa Online Portal was expanded to provide access to more than 200 government services, supported by Common Service Centres and the Gramin Mitra programme to improve last-mile service delivery.

He oversaw the implementation of the Startup and Information Technology Policy 2024, initiatives supporting artificial intelligence, blockchain, cybersecurity and drone technologies, and the launch of OneMap Goa, a GIS-based governance platform integrating data across government departments.

His tenure has also included the promotion of the Workation Goa initiative, development of the Electronic Manufacturing Cluster at Tuem, expansion of public digital infrastructure, and programmes supporting entrepreneurship, innovation and technology-led employment.

== Constituency Development ==
As MLA for Porvorim, Khaunte has overseen infrastructure and civic development projects relating to roads, water supply, sewerage, electricity, public healthcare, sports facilities, digital connectivity and community infrastructure.

Development initiatives undertaken in the constituency include road and traffic management projects, sewerage expansion, public health facilities, sports infrastructure, digitisation initiatives and public service delivery systems.

== Awards and Recognition ==
- Tourism Minister of the Year – India, PATWA, ITB Berlin (2024)
- Excellence in Tourism Leadership Award, Today's Traveller Awards (2024)
- National Youth Ideal Legislator Award
