= Mahadayi Water Disputes Tribunal =

Indian tribunal

The Mahadayi Water Disputes Tribunal (MWDT), also referred to as the Mhadei Water Disputes Tribunal, is a tribunal that adjudicates the dispute over River Mhadei water allocation.

The sharing of the waters of this river is a cause of dispute between the governments of Karnataka and Goa. The Karnataka government proposes to divert some water from the Mahadayi river to the Malaprabha River basin as part of the Kalasa-Banduri Nala project, as approximately 188 tmcft of water at 75% dependability is available in the river. Mahadayi Water Tribunal under Interstate River Water Disputes Act has been constituted to decide the sharing of the river waters by the riparian states. In August 2018, Mahadayi Water Tribunal verdict permitted Goa to use 24 tmcft (excluding the 9.395 tmcft prevailing uses), Karnataka to use 5.4 tmcft (including 3.9 tmcft for export outside the basin) and Maharashtra to use 1.33 tmcft for consumptive purposes. The tribunal assessed the water generated in the river catchment area of Karnataka and Maharashtra as 32.11 tmcft and 7.21 tmcft respectively at 75% dependability. The tribunal has apportioned only 40.125 tmcft of Mandovi river water for consumptive uses among the three riparian states. Karnataka approached the Supreme Court alleging injustice is done in allocation of water to the state.

Central government issued a gazette notification on 27 February 2020 permitting the Karnataka state to draw 13.42 tmcft of water from the Mahadayi river out of which 8 tmcft is for power generation.

== See also ==
- Krishna Water Disputes Tribunal
