= Mauvin Godinho =

Indian politician

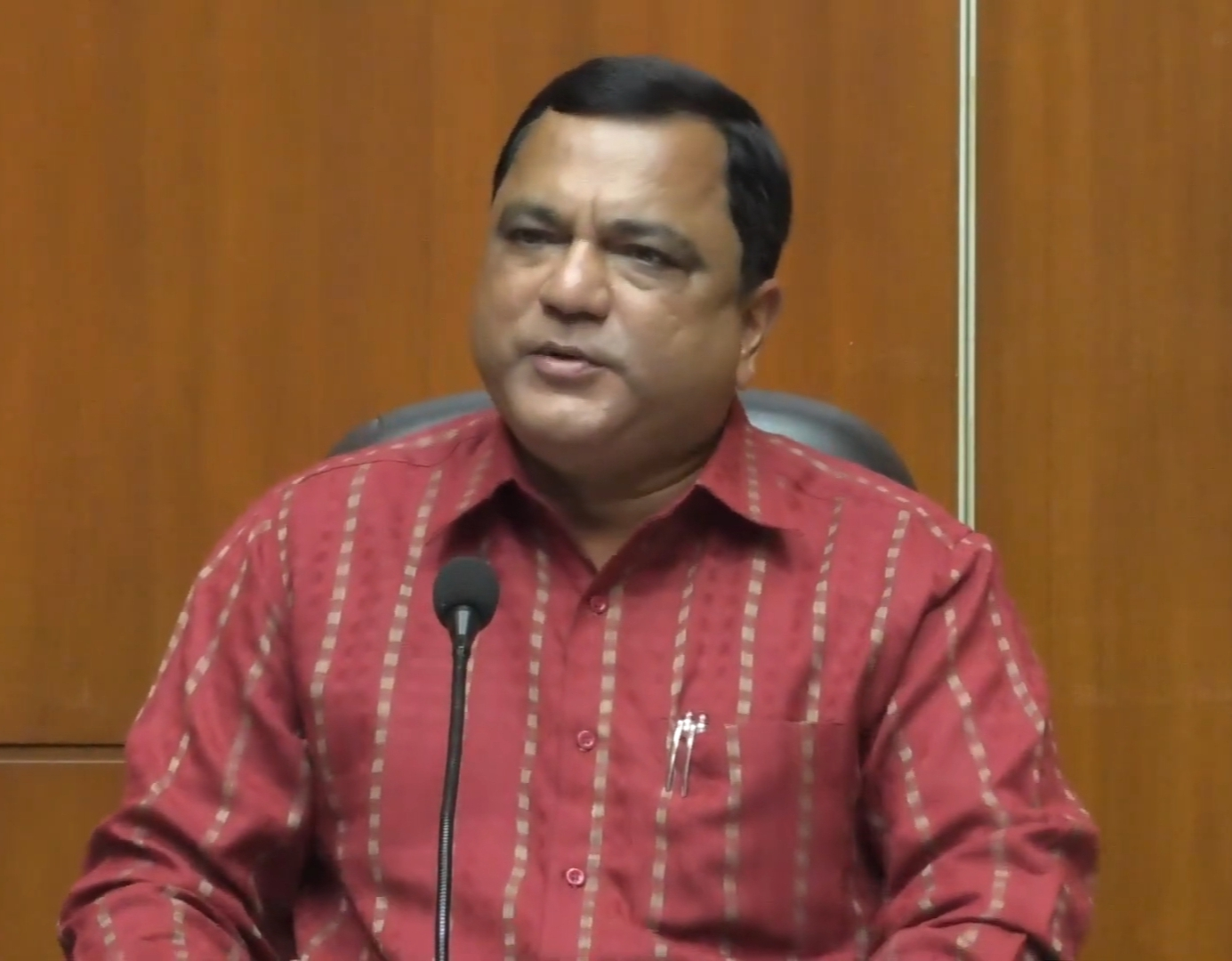
- Godinho in 2021

Member of the Goa Legislative Assembly
- Incumbent
- Assumed office 2012
- Preceded by: Simon Peter D’Souza
- Constituency: Dabolim

Member of the Goa Legislative Assembly
- In office 1990–2012
- Constituency: Cortalim

Cabinet Minister of Goa Government
- Incumbent
- Assumed office March 2022

Personal details
- Born: Mauvin Heliodoro Godinho
- Party: Bharatiya Janata Party (since 2016)
- Other political affiliations: Indian National Congress (1989–2016)
- Spouse: Maria Divina Godinho
- Children: 3

Mauvin Heliodoro Godinho is an Indian politician and businessman. He is a seven-term member of the Goa Legislative Assembly, representing the Dabolim Assembly constituency since 2012.

== Political career ==
Godinho was a senior member of the Indian National Congress (INC). In December 2016, he left the INC to join the rival Bharatiya Janata Party. In 2022, he won the assembly election on BJP ticket from Dabolim constituency.

He represents the Dabolim constituency since 2012, and from 1994 to 2012, he represented the Cortalim constituency.

Godinho won the 2017 Goa Legislative Assembly election with 7,234 votes and got elected again as MLA of Dabolim Constituency. He was inducted as cabinet minister on 12 April 2017 and later became the Panchayat Minister after getting the Panchayat portfolio in BJP Government.

== Personal life ==
Godinho is Catholic. At times, he has described himself as being more Hindu than Catholic, but this has been described as being a political move. He is married to Maria Divina Godinho, a businesswoman. Together, they have one son, Mackclean, and two daughters.

== Committees ==
- Sixth Legislative Assembly 2012
- Member Select Committee on The Goa Land Use
- Member Budget Committee
- Member Committee On Government Assurances
- Member Select Committee on The Goa Commission for Minorities
- Member Select Committee on The Goa School Education
- Fifth Legislative Assembly 2007
- Member Rules Committee
- Chairman Committee On Privileges
- Member Business Advisory Committee
- Member Select Committee On The Goa Police Bill
