= Revolutionary Goans Party =

Indian political party

- Abbreviation: RGP
- Leader: Viresh Borkar
- President: Viresh Borkar
- General Secretary: Melvin Da Silva
- Treasurer: Candido Correa
- Founder: Manoj Parab; Viresh Borkar; Vishvesh Naik
- Founded: 24 November 2021 (4 years ago)
- Preceded by: Revolutionary Goans (2017–2021)
- Headquarters: 414, 4th Floor, Kamat Towers, Patto, Panjim, Goa 403001
- Membership: 50,000 (2022)
- Ideology: Socialism (Indian); Secularism (Indian); Regionalism; Nativism
- ECI status: State Party
- Alliance: Goa Su-Raj Party (2021–2022); G.O.A. (Note: stands for the Grand Opposition Alliance, consisting of the Goa Pradesh Congress Committee and the Goa Forward Party.)(2025–2025; proposed); Goa Congress (since 2026)
- Seats in Goa Legislative Assembly: 1 / 40

Election symbol
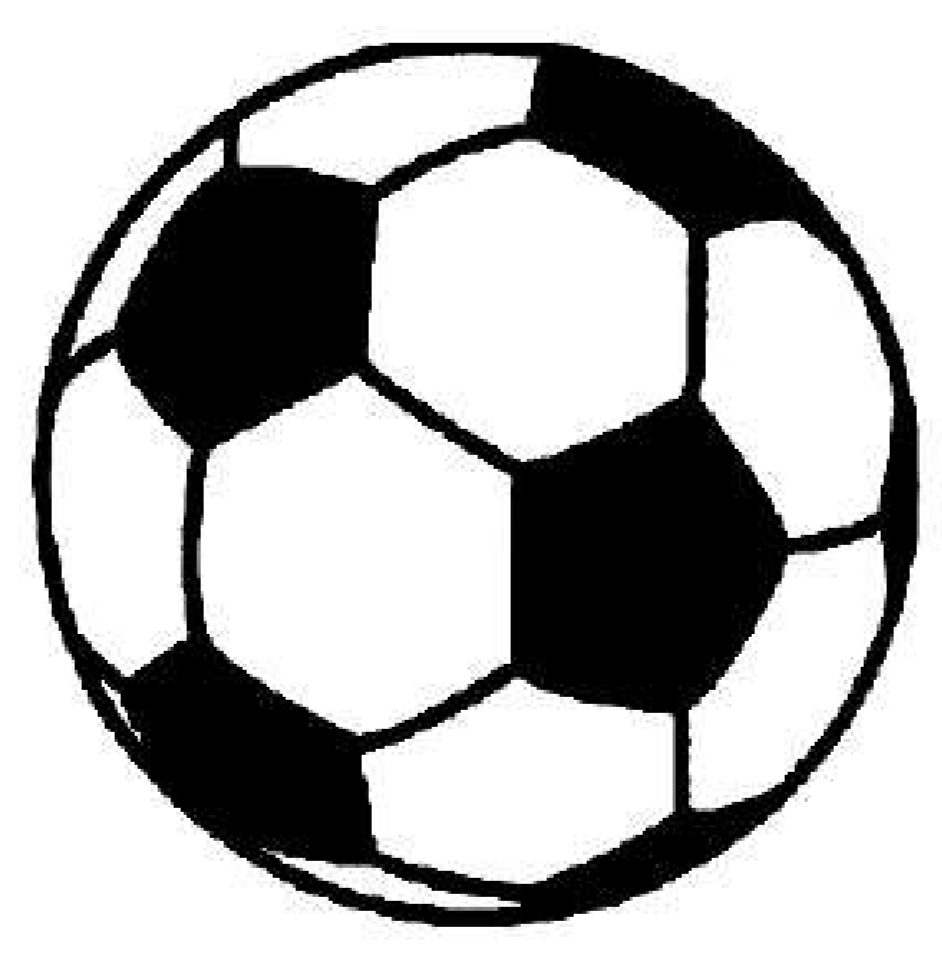

Website
- revolutionarygoansparty.org

The Revolutionary Goans Party (RGP) is a regional party in the Indian state of Goa. It was first founded as a non-governmental organization on 3 March 2017 under the name Revolutionary Goans (RG). The party later received recognition as a political party from the Election Commission of India on 1 January 2022. In its debut election, the party contested 38 seats in the 2022 Goa Legislative Assembly election and won the St. Andre constituency.

== Person of Goan Origin Bill 2019 ==
A central component of the Revolutionary Goans Party's platform is a bill that defines "Person of Goan Origin." According to the proposed criteria, this includes individuals (or their ancestors up to two generations) who were born or resided in Goa before 20 December 1961. The definition requires that the individual became an Indian citizen post-annexation, irrespective of nationality or passport they hold currently.

To protect the rights of the person of Goan origin of State of Goa in respect of jobs, benefits of various government schemes, education, Comunidade land and Government, semi-Government plots/apartments/shops, promotions and to make certain other provisions connected therewith.

Where it is expedient to give better protection to the person of Goan origin in view of special Portuguese laws, provisions of code of Comunidade, effect of late independence of Goa on education opportunities for Goans, Peculiar social and economic changes affecting Goans and changing demography vis-a-vis small size of the state and its population.

— The Goa Person of Goan Origin Bill 2019 (introductory paragraphs)

== List of national presidents ==
- Viresh Borkar (since 24 July 2026)

== List of state presidents ==
- Viresh Borkar (24 November 2021 – 2023)
- Manoj Parab (2023 – 21 May 2026)
- Shavina Shirodkar (since 30 August 2026)

== Electoral performance ==
=== Lok Sabha (General) election results ===
Election	Lok sabha	Party leader	Seats contested	Seats won	+/- in seats	Overall vote %	Vote swing	Ref.
2024	18th	Manoj Parab	2	0 / 543	Steady		▲	

=== Goa Legislative Assembly elections ===
Election Year	Leader	seats contested	seats won	+/- in seats	Overall votes	% of overall votes	+/- in vote share	Sitting side
Goa Legislative Assembly
2022	Manoj Parab	38	1 / 40	▲1	93,255	9.81%	▲9.81	

== See also ==
- List of political parties in India
