= 1963 Goa, Daman and Diu Legislative Assembly election =

Election in Indian union territory

- 9 December 1963

All 30 seats in the Goa, Daman & Diu Legislative Assembly 16 seats needed for a majority
- Turnout: 50-70%
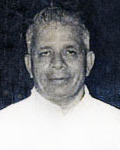

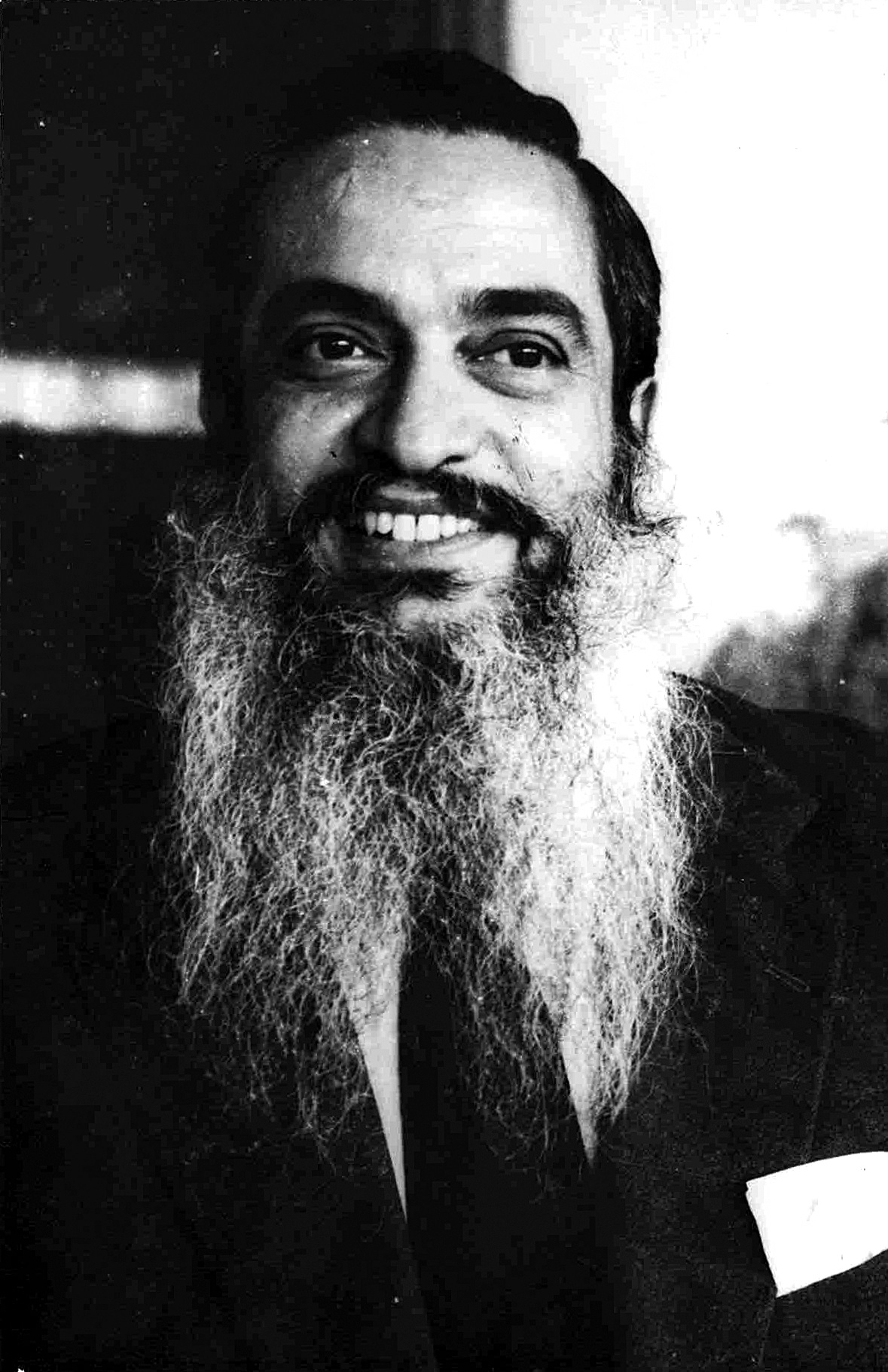
	Majority party	Minority party	Third party
			INC
Leader	Dayanand Bandodkar	Jack de Sequeira
Party	MGP	UGP	INC
Leader's seat	Marcaim (bypoll)	Panaji
Seats before	New	New	New
Seats won	14	12	1
Seat change	New	New	New
Popular vote	40.13%	29.69%	17.27%
CM before election
Office established
CM
Dayanand Bandodkar
MGP

The first elections to the Goa, Daman and Diu Legislative Assembly were held in December 1963, to elect members of the 30 constituencies, in the Union territory of Goa, Daman and Diu, India.

The Maharashtrawadi Gomantak Party won the most seats (fourteen), and its leader, Dayanand Bandodkar was appointed as the Chief Minister of Goa, Daman and Diu. The United Goans Party won 12 seats, three seats were won by Independents, whereas the Jawaharlal Nehru-led Indian National Congress only won one seat.

== Background ==
After the Annexation of Dadra and Nagar Haveli in 1954, followed by the Annexation of Goa in 1961, the new union territory of Goa, Daman and Diu was established. Later, in 1963, after the passing of the Government of Union Territories Act, 1963, Goa, Daman and Diu was assigned a Legislative Assembly of thirty seats.

To facilitate the upcoming election, A. F. Couto was made the Chief Electoral Officer of the union territory on 19 August 1963. The Delimitation Commission of India split up the Union territory into 30 constituencies; 28 in Goa and one each for Daman and Diu. On 3 October, it was announced that the Indian National Congress, Frente Popular and the Maharashtrawadi Gomantak Party (MGP) were allowed to have reserved electoral symbols, followed on 24 October, by the United Goans Party (UGP).

== Election schedule ==
Event	Date
Last Date for filing Nominations	11 November 1963
Date for scrutiny of nominations	13 November 1963
Last date for withdrawal of candidatures	16 November 1963
Date of poll	9 December 1963
Date before which the election shall be completed	11 December 1963

== Results ==
Party	Votes	%	Seats
Maharashtrawadi Gomantak Party	100,117	40.13	14
United Goans Party	74,081	29.69	12
Indian National Congress	43,100	17.27	1
Frente Popular	4,548	1.82	0
Independents (Note: Independents included two candidates of the Praja Socialist Party)	27,648	11.08	3
Total	249,494	100.00	30
Valid votes	249,494	95.82	
Invalid/blank votes	10,878	4.18	
Total votes	260,372	100.00	

== Elected members ==
#	Constituency	Member	Party
1	Pernem	Kashinath Shetgaonkar	Maharashtrawadi Gomantak Party
2	Mandrem	Vijay Kamulkar	Maharashtrawadi Gomantak Party
3	Siolim	Pandurang Purushottam Shirodkar	Maharashtrawadi Gomantak Party
4	Calangute	John D'Souza	United Goans Party
5	Aldona	Orlando Sequeira Lobo	United Goans Party
6	Mapusa	Raghunath Tople	Maharashtrawadi Gomantak Party
7	Tivim	Shambu Palienkar	Maharashtrawadi Gomantak Party
8	Bicholim	Kusmakar Kadkade	Maharashtrawadi Gomantak Party
9	Pale	A. K. S. Usgaonkar	Maharashtrawadi Gomantak Party
10	Sattari	Jaisingrao Rane	Praja Socialist Party
11	Panaji	Jack Sequeira	United Goans Party
12	Santa Cruz	Joaquim L. Araujo	United Goans Party
13	Santo Andre	Teotonio Pereira	United Goans Party
14	Sant Estevam	Dattaram Chopdekar	Maharashtrawadi Gomantak Party
15	Marcaim	Vasant Velingkar (Note: Resigned for Dayanand Bandodkar)	Maharashtrawadi Gomantak Party
16	Ponda	Gajanan Raikar	Praja Socialist Party
17	Siroda	Pundalik Naik	Maharashtrawadi Gomantak Party
18	Sanguem	Tony Fernandes	Maharashtrawadi Gomantak Party
19	Canacona	Ganba Desai	Maharashtrawadi Gomantak Party
20	Quepem	Dattaram Desai	Maharashtrawadi Gomantak Party
21	Curchorem	Vittal Karmali	United Goans Party
22	Cuncolim	Sebastiao Mazarelo	United Goans Party
23	Benaulim	Maurilio Furtado	United Goans Party
24	Navelim	Alvaro de Loyola Furtado	United Goans Party
25	Margao	Vasudeo Narayan Sarmalkar	United Goans Party
26	Curtorim	Enio Pimenta	United Goans Party
27	Cortalim	Luis Proto Barbosa	United Goans Party
28	Marmagoa	Urminda Mascarenhas	United Goans Party
29	Daman	Kalidas Patel	Indian National Congress
30	Diu	Mamdali Jiwani	Independent

== Aftermath ==
On 20 December 1963, Dayanand Bandodkar was sworn in as Chief Minister. His cabinet included only two other ministers, Vittal Karmali and Tony Fernandes. Jack de Sequeira, of the UGP, was the first Leader of the Opposition and Pandurang Purushottam Shirodkar was the first Speaker of the Assembly.

Since the party in government, the MGP, was in favour of merging the territory with Maharashtra, they precipitated the issue. This led to the 1967 Goa status referendum, where the voters rejected the merger and instead opted to remain a Union Territory.

== Bypolls ==
Year	Constituency	Reason for by-poll	Winning candidate	Party
1964	Marcaim	Resignation of V.C. Velingker	Dayanand Bandodkar	Maharashtrawadi Gomantak Party
Source:ECI

== See also ==
- List of constituencies of the Goa Legislative Assembly
