= Vittal Karmali =

Indian politician (died 1967)

- Official portrait in 1963

Minister of Law, Education and Public health Government of Goa, Daman and Diu
- In office 20 December 1963 – 1967
- Governor: M. R. Sachdev
- Chief Minister: Dayanand Bandodkar

Member of Goa, Daman and Diu Legislative Assembly
- In office 11 December 1963 – 1967
- Preceded by: constituency established
- Succeeded by: Abdul Razak
- Constituency: Curchorem
- In office 1967 – 2 September 1967
- Preceded by: Pundalik Naik
- Succeeded by: Krishnanath Naik
- Constituency: Siroda
- Majority: 4,571

Personal details
- Born: Vittal Subrai Kamali
- Died: 2 September 1967 Goa, India
- Party: Maharashtrawadi Gomantak Party (1963–September 1967)
- Occupation: Politician
- Cabinet: Minister
- Committees: Public accounts
- Portfolio: Information; Education; Public health
- Nicknames: V.S. Karmali; Shrirang Karmali

Vittal Subraya Karmali (Note: alternatively spelled as Vithal Subrai Karmali) (unknown – 2 September 1967), also known as V.S. Karmali or Shrirang Karmali, was an Indian politician. He was a former member of the Goa, Daman and Diu Legislative Assembly, representing the Curchorem Assembly constituency from 1963 to 1967 and Siroda Assembly constituency from 1967 to September 1967. He also served as the cabinet minister in the first Dayanand Bandodkar ministry.

== Career ==
Karmali contested in the 1963 Goa, Daman and Diu Legislative Assembly election from the Curchorem Assembly constituency on the Maharashtrawadi Gomantak Party (MGP) ticket and emerged victorious. He served for four years from 1963 to 1967. Karmali was made the cabinet minister in the first Dayanand Bandodkar ministry and was allotted Law, Education and Public health as portfolios.

He then successfully contested in the 1967 Goa, Daman and Diu Legislative Assembly election from Siroda Assembly constituency on the MGP ticket and defeated United Goans (Sequiera Group) candidate, J. F. S. Fernandes by a margin of 3277 votes. He served for few months from 1967 until his death in September 1967, following this a by-election was held in the constituency in 1968.

== Death ==
Karmali died on 2 September 1967, he was remembered for his role in setting up large number of primary schools in Goa as the then education minister in Dayanand Bandodkar's ministry.

== Positions held ==
- Chairman of the Public Account Committee
