= Mapusa Assembly constituency =

Legislative Assembly constituency in Goa State, India

Coordinates: 15.60°N 73.81°E

Mapusa
- Constituency No. 5 for the Goa Legislative Assembly

Constituency details
- Country: India
- Region: Western India
- State: Goa
- District: North Goa
- Lok Sabha constituency: North Goa
- Established: 1963
- Total electors: 29,294
- Reservation: None

Member of Legislative Assembly
- 8th Goa Legislative Assembly
- Incumbent Joshua D'Souza
- Party: Bharatiya Janata Party

Mapusa Assembly constituency is one of the 40 assembly constituencies of Goa, a southern state of India. Mapusa is also one of the 20 constituencies that comes under North Goa Lok Sabha constituency.

It is part of North Goa district.

== Members of Legislative Assembly ==
Year	Member	Party
1963	Raghunath Tople	Maharashtrawadi Gomantak Party
1967	Gopal Mayekar	Maharashtrawadi Gomantak Party
1972	Raghuvir Pancar	Maharashtrawadi Gomantak Party
1977	Surendra Sirsat	Maharashtrawadi Gomantak Party
1980	Shamsunder Nevagi	Indian National Congress
1984	Chandreshekar Diucar	Maharashtrawadi Gomantak Party
1989	Surendra Sirsat	Maharashtrawadi Gomantak Party
1994	Surendra Sirsat	Maharashtrawadi Gomantak Party
1999	Francis D'Souza	Goa Rajiv Congress Party
2002	Francis D'Souza	Bharatiya Janata Party
2007	Francis D'Souza	Bharatiya Janata Party
2012	Francis D'Souza	Bharatiya Janata Party
2017	Francis D'Souza	Bharatiya Janata Party
2019 (Note: by-election)	Joshua D'Souza	Bharatiya Janata Party
2022	Joshua D'Souza	Bharatiya Janata Party

== Election results ==
=== 2027 Assembly election ===
2027 Goa Legislative Assembly election: Mapusa
Party	Candidate	Votes	%	±%
INC				
NDA				
NOTA	None of the above			
Majority				
Turnout				
gain from		Swing		

=== Assembly Election 2022 ===
2022 Goa Legislative Assembly election : Mapusa
Party	Candidate	Votes	%	±%
BJP	Joshua De Souza	10,195	43.87	▼5.87
INC	Sudhir Rama Kandolkar	8,548	36.78	▼7.83
AAP	Rahul Mhambre	1,511	6.50	▲5.42
AITC	Tarak Arolkar	1,366	5.88	New
RGP	Rohan Salgaonkar	996	4.29	New
NOTA	None of the Above	296	1.27	New
Margin of victory		1,647	7.09	▲1.96
Turnout		23,240	77.98	▲2.48
Registered electors		29,294		▲0.28
BJP hold		Swing	▼5.87	

=== Assembly By-election 2019 ===
2019 Goa Legislative Assembly by-election : Mapusa
Party	Candidate	Votes	%	±%
BJP	Joshua De Souza	11,167	49.74	▲1.61
INC	Sudhir Rama Kandolkar	10,016	44.61	▲31.38
Independent	Ashish Shirodkar	504	2.24	New
GSM	Nandan Alias Narasinha Ravalnath Sawant	279	1.24	New
AAP	Shekhar Tukaram Nak	243	1.08	▼9.11
NCP	Sanjay Vithu Barde	200	0.89	▼0.38
Margin of victory		1,151	5.13	▼24.87
Turnout		22,451	76.86	▼2.16
Registered electors		29,212		▲1.40
BJP hold		Swing	▲1.61	

=== Assembly Election 2017 ===
2017 Goa Legislative Assembly election : Mapusa
Party	Candidate	Votes	%	±%
BJP	Francis D'Souza	10,957	48.13	▼25.70
MGP	Vinod Fadke	4,129	18.14	New
INC	Vijay Laxman Bhike	3,013	13.24	New
AAP	Shraddha Khalap	2,321	10.20	New
Independent	Domnic Alphonso	1,543	6.78	New
NOTA	None of the Above	409	1.80	New
NCP	Sanjay Vithu Barde	289	1.27	▼22.36
Margin of victory		6,828	29.99	▼20.21
Turnout		22,764	79.02	▲0.08
Registered electors		28,808		▲12.27
BJP hold		Swing	▼25.70	

=== Assembly Election 2012 ===
2012 Goa Legislative Assembly election : Mapusa
Party	Candidate	Votes	%	±%
BJP	Francis D'Souza	14,955	73.83	▲18.88
NCP	Ashish Tulshidas Shirodkar	4,786	23.63	▲8.03
Independent	Francisca De Souza	280	1.38	New
AITC	Mittu Mujavar	188	0.93	New
Margin of victory		10,169	50.20	▲12.97
Turnout		20,256	78.76	▲14.07
Registered electors		25,659		▼9.47
BJP hold		Swing	▲18.88	

=== Assembly Election 2007 ===
2007 Goa Legislative Assembly election : Mapusa
Party	Candidate	Votes	%	±%
BJP	Francis D'Souza	10,104	54.95	▲2.80
JD(S)	Subhash G. Narvekar	3,258	17.72	New
NCP	Braganza Ryan	2,868	15.60	▲14.58
MGP	Shirodkar Kiran Mahadev Hanumant	1,198	6.52	▲0.73
Independent	Karekar Narayan S.	690	3.75	New
Independent	Vernekar Prabhakar Balkrishna	158	0.86	New
RPI(A)	Hasotikar Sudesh	111	0.60	New
Margin of victory		6,846	37.23	▲24.12
Turnout		18,387	64.87	▲2.90
Registered electors		28,344		▲9.33
BJP hold		Swing	▲2.80	

=== Assembly Election 2002 ===
2002 Goa Legislative Assembly election : Mapusa
Party	Candidate	Votes	%	±%
BJP	Francis D'Souza	8,378	52.15	New
INC	Braganza Armindo Jose	6,271	39.04	New
MGP	Raikar Paresh Atmaram	929	5.78	New
SS	Harmalkar Sanjay Pundalik	315	1.96	New
NCP	Divkar Prasad Kalidas	163	1.01	New
Margin of victory		2,107	13.12	▲2.94
Turnout		16,065	61.93	▲0.89
Registered electors		25,925		▲2.28
BJP gain from Goa Rajiv Congress Party		Swing	▲15.96	

=== Assembly Election 1999 ===
1999 Goa Legislative Assembly election : Mapusa
Party	Candidate	Votes	%	±%
Goa Rajiv Congress Party	Francis D'Souza	5,602	36.19	New
INC	Natekar Gurudas Bhalchandra	4,027	26.01	New
BJP	Shirodkar Tulashidas Atmaram	3,013	19.46	New
MGP	Sirsat Surendra Vasant	2,318	14.97	
Independent	Bhike Vijay Laxman	247	1.60	New
SS	Palyekar Keshav Shambhu	154	0.99	New
Independent	Pereira Boni Peter Oliver	115	0.74	New
Margin of victory		1,575	10.17	▲6.72
Turnout		15,481	61.06	▼3.70
Registered electors		25,347		▲17.20
Goa Rajiv Congress Party gain from MGP		Swing	▼13.58	

=== Assembly Election 1994 ===
1994 Goa Legislative Assembly election : Mapusa
Party	Candidate	Votes	%	±%
MGP	Surendra Sirsat	6,972	49.76	▲7.25
INC	Natekar Gurudas Bhalchandra	6,488	46.31	New
BSP	Dias Anthony Leo	206	1.47	New
Margin of victory		484	3.45	▼12.44
Turnout		14,010	64.00	▼4.53
Registered electors		21,628		▲10.46
MGP hold		Swing		

=== Assembly Election 1989 ===
1989 Goa Legislative Assembly election : Mapusa
Party	Candidate	Votes	%	±%
MGP	Surendra Sirsat	5,769	42.51	▲10.36
Independent	D Souza Francies C. J. A.	3,612	26.62	New
INC	Nevgi Shamsunder Jairam	3,421	25.21	New
SS	Joshi Ramprasad Raghunath	145	1.03	New
Independent	Kenaudekar Dronacharya Dattaram	110	0.79	New
Margin of victory		2,157	15.90	▲13.18
Turnout		13,570	67.08	▼3.75
Registered electors		19,580		▼1.07
MGP hold		Swing	▲10.36	

=== Assembly Election 1984 ===
1984 Goa, Daman and Diu Legislative Assembly election : Mapusa
Party	Candidate	Votes	%	±%
MGP	Diucar Chandreshkar Sihivram	4,649	32.15	New
INC	Dhuri Ulhas Bhiku	4,257	29.44	New
Independent	Nevgi Shamsunder Jairam	3,274	22.64	New
Independent	Kochkar Chandrakant Shiva	821	5.68	New
BJP	Chandrakant Jairam	589	4.07	New
Independent	Braganza Urban Mathew	253	1.75	New
Independent	Gaitonde Kumar Sadashiv	140	0.97	New
Margin of victory		392	2.71	▼4.98
Turnout		14,459	70.84	▼0.11
Registered electors		19,791		▲3.02
MGP gain from INC(U)		Swing	▼15.09	

=== Assembly Election 1980 ===
1980 Goa, Daman and Diu Legislative Assembly election : Mapusa
Party	Candidate	Votes	%	±%
INC(U)	Nevagi Shamsunder Jairam	6,640	47.24	New
MGP	Surendra Sirsat	5,559	39.55	
JP	Tople Raghunath Anant	857	6.10	New
Independent	Prabhu Bhaskar Rajaram	227	1.61	New
JP(S)	Nasnodkar Narayan Anant	212	1.51	New
Margin of victory		1,081	7.69	▼5.97
Turnout		14,056	70.25	▲8.64
Registered electors		19,210		▲1.61
INC(U) gain from MGP		Swing	▲4.38	

=== Assembly Election 1977 ===
1977 Goa, Daman and Diu Legislative Assembly election : Mapusa
Party	Candidate	Votes	%	±%
MGP	Surendra Sirsat	5,229	42.86	▼5.37
JP	Bhandare Gangadhar Yeshwant	3,563	29.20	New
INC	Narvenkar Shrirang Pandurang	3,295	27.01	New
Margin of victory		1,666	13.66	▼4.78
Turnout		12,200	63.93	▼10.43
Registered electors		18,906		▲19.53
MGP hold		Swing	▼5.37	

=== Assembly Election 1972 ===
1972 Goa, Daman and Diu Legislative Assembly election : Mapusa
Party	Candidate	Votes	%	±%
MGP	Pankar Raghuvir Shanu	5,718	48.23	▼2.7
UGP	N. S. Pandurang	3,532	29.79	New
INC	Amonkar Suresh Gundo	1,939	16.35	New
MGP	R. D. Mayenkar	424	3.58	
Margin of victory		2,186	18.44	▲5.08
Turnout		11,856	73.82	▲0.42
Registered electors		15,817		▲9.63
MGP hold		Swing	▼2.70	

=== Assembly Election 1967 ===
1967 Goa, Daman and Diu Legislative Assembly election : Mapusa
Party	Candidate	Votes	%	±%
MGP	Gopal Mayekar	5,476	50.93	New
UGP	K. T. Mangesh	4,040	37.57	New
Independent	S. V. Pandurang	411	3.82	New
Independent	M. T. Braganza	253	2.35	New
Independent	A. J. Piedade	151	1.40	New
Margin of victory		1,436	13.35	
Turnout		10,753	72.20	
Registered electors		14,427		
MGP win (new seat)				

== See also ==
- Mapusa
- List of constituencies of Goa Legislative Assembly
