= Lavoo =

Lavoo may refer to:

- George LaVoo, American filmmaker
- Lavoo Mamledar, Indian politician
