= Joshua De Souza =

Indian politician (born 1988)

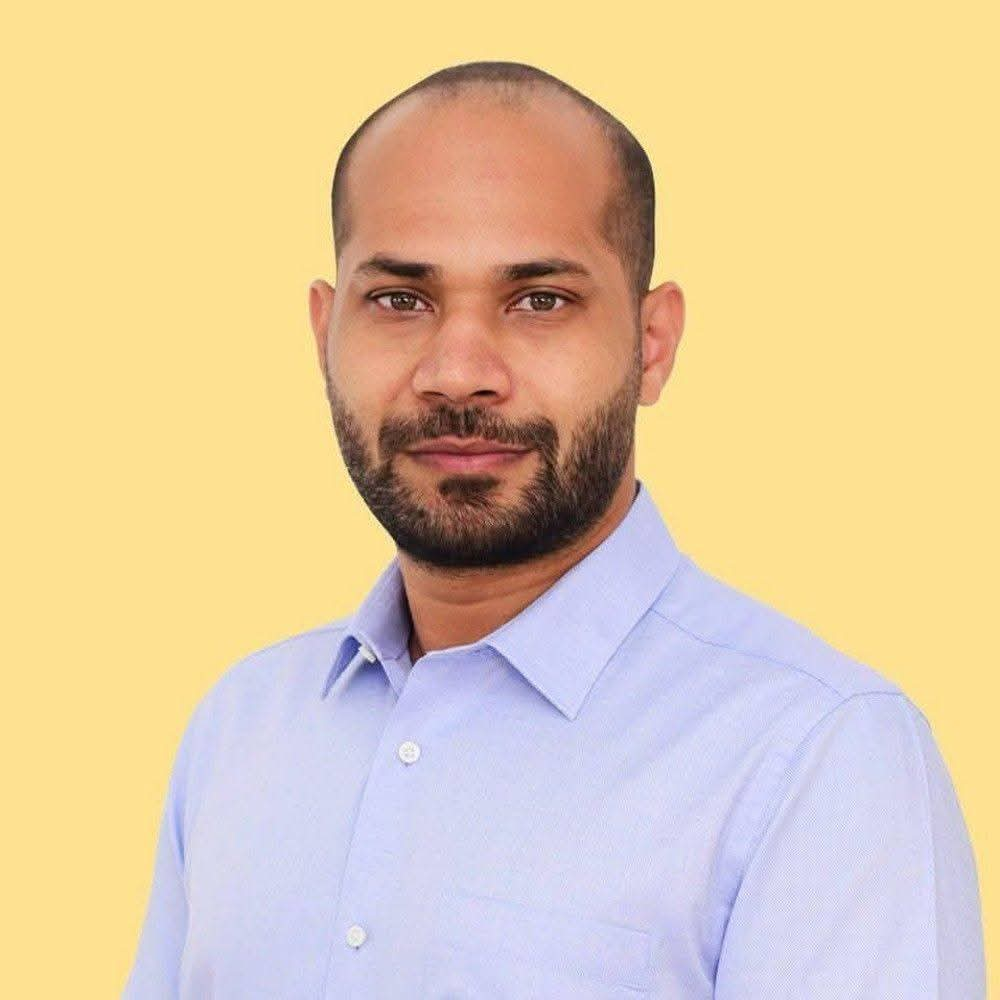
- Joshua Peter De Souza
- Chief Minister: Pramod Sawant

Deputy Speaker Goa Legislative Assembly
- Incumbent
- Assumed office 22 July 2022
- Speaker: Ramesh Tawadkar (-2025); Ganesh Gaonkar (2025-)
- Preceded by: Subhash Phal Desai

Member of Goa Legislative Assembly
- Incumbent
- Assumed office 28 May 2019
- Preceded by: Francis D'Souza
- Constituency: Mapusa

Personal details
- Born: Joshua De Souza; 12 November 1988 (age 37) Mapusa, Goa, India
- Party: Bharatiya Janata Party (since 2019)
- Parent: Francis D'Souza (father)
- Education: St. Xavier's College (B.Com)

Joshua Peter De Souza (born 12 November 1988) is an Indian politician and businessman who serves as a member of the Goa Legislative Assembly, representing the Mapusa since 2019. He is a member of the Bharatiya Janata Party. On 22 July 2022, de Souza was elected as the Deputy Speaker of Goa Legislative Assembly with a majority of 24-12 votes against Siolim MLA Delilah Lobo.

Currently, he is the Member of the Legislative Assembly of Mapusa Constituency, National General Secretary of Bharatiya Janta Party Minority Morcha, the Vice Chairman of Goa State Infrastructure Development Corporation (GSIDC) and the Chairman of Mormugao Planning and Development Authority (MPDA). Besides that, he is also a social worker and entrepreneur.

== Personal life ==
De Souza is the son of former Deputy Chief Minister of Goa Francis D'Souza. He completed his B.Com at St. Xavier's College in Mapusa, Goa.

De Souza's father died on 14 February 2019 at the age of 64, following a battle with cancer. After his death, de Souza decided to contest his first by-election in 2019. He won the 2019 by-election and was elected as the MLA of Mapusa Assembly constituency. He was re-elected in 2022 Goa Legislative Assembly election.

== Posts held ==
- 2015 – 2019: Councillor Ward No. 13, Mapusa Municipal Council
- 2019 – present: MLA, Mapusa Constituency
- 2021 – present: Vice Chairman of Goa State Infrastructure Development Corporation (GSIDC)
- 2021 – present: National General Secretary of the BJP Minority Morcha
- 2022 – present: Chairman of Mormugao Planning and Development Authority (MPDA)
- 2022 – present: Deputy Speaker of Goa Legislative Assembly
