= Channeache Rati =

"Channeache Rati" ("In a Moonlit Night") is a Goan Konkani song.

== Creation ==
The song was composed by Ulhas Buyao (Known as Goyem Shahir) at the time of the Goa Opinion Poll in 1967 in support of the anti-merger movement, of which Buyao was an important part. The lyrics were written by advocate and editor of the Konkani newspaper Sunaparant, Uday Bhembre, who was also part of the anti-merger movement. Buyao was also a strong supporter of writing Konkani in the Roman script

== Copyright controversy ==
In 1996, Rajendra Talak produced a new album of Konkani songs, including Channeache Rati, sung by Asha Bhosle and Suresh Wadkar. The album, Daryachya Deger (On the seashore) was released by Talak's company 'Shrushti Vision'. Claiming a copyright on the song, Buyao filed a case in June 1996 demanding an injunction on the sale and distribution of the cassette that includes the song and seeking compensation of Rs 2 lakh from the respondents. Talak, on the other hand, claims that Buyao had sold its copyrights to The Gramophone Company of India. The song became a hit after Gramophone India brought out a gramophone record of Buyao's songs in 1967. Bhembre submitted that the copyright to the lyrics vested with him and Shrushti Vision had sought his consent to use the song. Buyao claimed that even though Gramophone India released Buyao's songs in 1967, the copyright to their tunes and musical composition is with him. According to the law, a copyright expires 50 years after its registration.

After listening to the arguments at various sittings for three years, the Margao district and sessions judge finally agreed to listen to both the songs in the courtroom. It was a memorable day for the courtroom, which was full of members of the public and the lawyers. Buyao sang the version the 1960s and Asha and Wadkar of the 1990s. Talak played the cassette on a modern cassette player. but Buyao had to arrange for a gramophone, which is difficult to find, to play the LP record of the 1960s.

== Song chorus ==
The tune of the chorus of this song was used by music director Anu Malik for the chorus of the song "Chunari Chunari" in the 1999 Hindi film Biwi No.1.

== Notes and references ==
- Article about Ulhas Buyao
- Article about Ulhas Buyao
- Ruling of the court case
- Article about the court case
- Article about the court case from the Indian Express
- Article about the court case from Rediff.com
