= Michael Lobo (politician) =

Indian politician and businessman (born 1976)

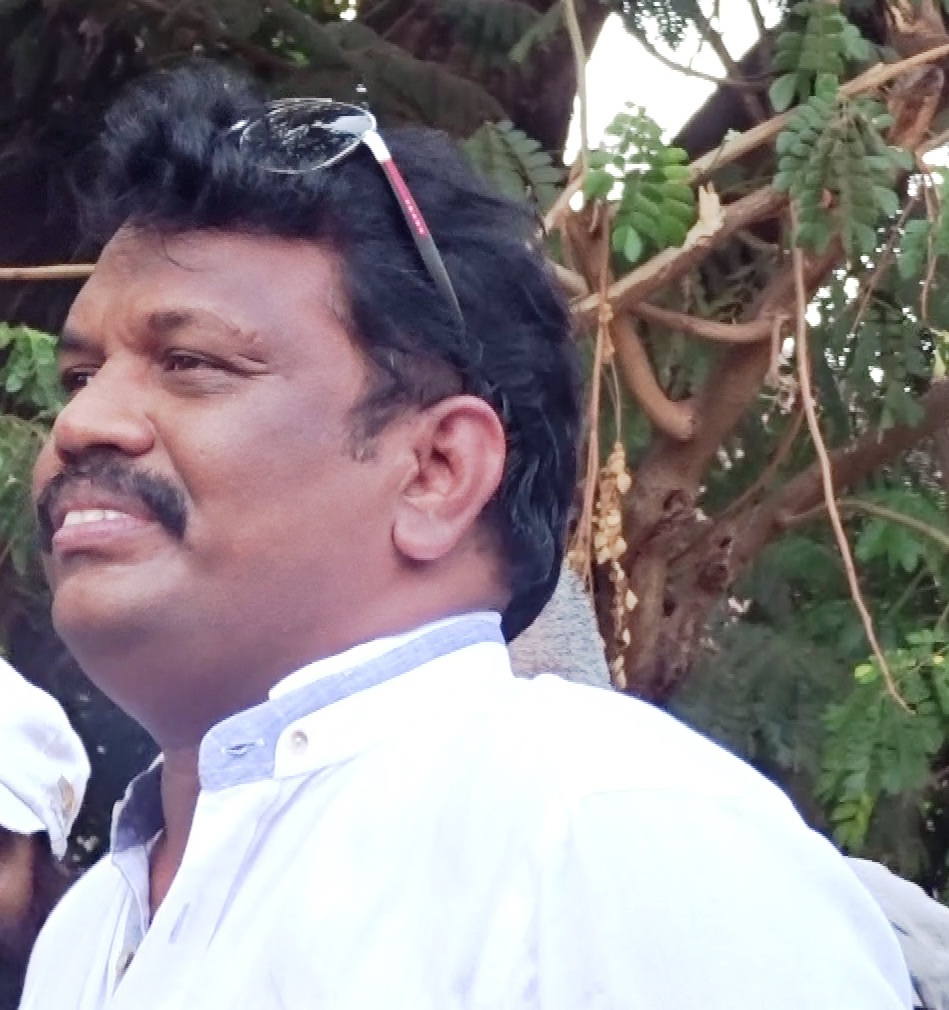
- Lobo in 2016

Leader of the Opposition of Goa Legislative Assembly
- In office 31 March 2022 – 10 July 2022
- Preceded by: Digambar Kamat
- Succeeded by: Yuri Alemao

Member of the Goa Legislative Assembly
- Incumbent
- Assumed office 7 March 2012
- Preceded by: Agnelo Nicholas Fernandes
- Constituency: Calangute

Personal details
- Born: Michael Vincent Lobo; 18 June 1976 (age 50) Mapusa, Goa, India
- Party: Bharatiya Janata Party (2007–2022) (2022–present)
- Other political affiliations: Indian National Congress (before 2007, 2022–2022)
- Spouse: Delilah Lobo
- Children: 2
- Education: St. Britto High School
- Occupation: Politician; businessman
- Cabinet: Minister
- Committees: Estimates; Budget
- Portfolio: Minister for waste management

Michael Vincent Lobo (born 18 June 1976) is an Indian politician and businessman who is a member of the Bharatiya Janata Party and a MLA of the Goa Legislative Assembly from Calangute since 2012. He is also the former Leader of Opposition in the Goa Legislative Assembly.

Lobo opposed the opening of India's first Playboy club in Candolim. Lobo resigned as Member of Legislative Assembly for Calangute under Bhartiya Janta Party. He then joined Indian National Congress and was made a candidate for the 2022 Goa Legislative Assembly election for Calangute. He then defected to the Bharatiya Janata Party after the elections.

== Early life ==
Michael Vincent Lobo was born on 18 June 1976 to Melchiades Vincent Lobo and Almira Lobo in Mapusa, Goa, India. He obtained a Higher Secondary School Certificate (twelfth grade) in 1993.

== Political career ==
Lobo began his career as a member of the Indian National Congress prior to 2007. He later quit to be a member of the Bharatiya Janata Party. The party is the ruling party in Goa. He also served as the president of North Goa BJP.

Lobo contested on the BJP ticket from Calangute Vidhan Sabha constituency (constituency number eight) in the 2012 Goa legislative assembly election. According to his statement of expenditure on election, he spent over ₹400,000 (US$4,200) of his own money on his campaign. He received a total of 9,891 votes out of 17,751 polled votes, and won against the Indian National Congress candidate and incumbent MLA for Calangute Agnelo Nicholas Fernandes by 1,875 votes.

He became a member of the Sixth Legislative Assembly of the State of Goa when it was constituted on 7 March 2012. He resigned as a Minister and the Member of Legislative Assembly on 10 January 2022. He joined the Indian National Congress on 11 January 2022 along with his wife.

[The Department of Tourism is] saying the owner of the plot has applied for a private shack license. I've been asking to see the file for the last seven months. Now, they're saying the owner has given an affidavit that no vulgarity or nudity will be permitted there, but Playboy means 'entertainment for men' by scantily-clad women.

— Michael Lobo on a proposed Playboy club

He is the chairman of the North Goa Planning and Development Authority since 24 May 2012; the authority has jurisdiction over state capital Panaji and Mapusa. In April 2013, he vehemently opposed the proposal for opening India's first Playboy Club at Candolim Beach, Candolim, and said the proposal was "tantamount to promoting prostitution". He declared his intention to go on a hunger strike to protest against the government if it went ahead with the proposal and allowed the Playboy club. The government withdrew its permission under intense opposition from different sectors of the community including sarpanchas, social activists, women's groups and members of the ruling party itself.

He campaigned for the party's candidates in Mangalore during the 2013 Karnataka Legislative Assembly election in April and May 2013, and met the Bishop of the Roman Catholic Diocese of Mangalore Aloysius Paul D'Souza for his endorsement. He is a member of Estimates Committee and Budget Committee in the Government of Goa since 8 August 2013.

On 8 November 2015, Lobo tore down an illegal compound wall being constructed next to a resort in Calangute. The resort owner has also illegally filled up a lowlying paddy field adjacent to his resort near the Calangute church.

=== Leader of the Opposition, Goa ===
As a Congress MLA, he was the Leader of the Opposition in the Goa Legislative Assembly from 31 March 2022 until 10 July 2022.

=== Defection to BJP ===
On 14 September 2022, Lobo along with former Chief Minister of Goa and senior Congress leader Digambar Kamat and 6 other Congress MLAs joined Bharatiya Janata Party, after meeting Dr. Pramod Sawant, Chief Minister of Goa.

== Personal life ==
Lobo is married to Delilah Lobo, and together they have two children. Delilah is the current member of Goa Legislative Assembly of Siolim Assembly constituency. He is a practising Roman Catholic.

Lobo and his wife are in possession of properties and pecuniary resources in the form of cash at hand, money in banks, National Savings Scheme and postal savings, land, jewels, insurance and properties worth about ₹200 million (US$2.1 million) as in 2012, based on information furnished by Lobo in the affidavit submitted by him while filing his nomination for the 2012 state assembly election.

His interests include music, dancing and swimming. He resides in Parra, Goa.
