= Velingkar =

Velingkar is a Konkani surname. Notable people with the surname include:

- Subhash Velingkar (born 1948), Indian politician
- Vasant Velingkar (fl. 1963–1977), Indian politician

== See also ==
- Vicky Velingkar, film
