= Marcaim Assembly constituency =

Legislative Assembly constituency in Goa State, India

Coordinates: 15.42°N 73.95°E

Marcaim
- Constituency No. 23 for the Goa Legislative Assembly

Constituency details
- Country: India
- Region: Western India
- State: Goa
- District: North Goa
- Lok Sabha constituency: South Goa
- Established: 1963
- Total electors: 28,275
- Reservation: None

Member of Legislative Assembly
- 8th Goa Legislative Assembly
- Incumbent Sudin Dhavalikar
- Party: MGP
- Alliance: NDA
- Elected year: 2022

Marcaim Assembly constituency is one of the 40 Goa Legislative Assembly constituencies of the state of Goa in southern India. Marcaim is also one of the 20 constituencies falling under South Goa Lok Sabha constituency.

== Members of Legislative Assembly ==
Year	Member	Party
1963	Vasant Velingkar	Maharashtrawadi Gomantak Party
1964 (Note: by-election)	Dayanand Bandodkar	Maharashtrawadi Gomantak Party
1967	Dayanand Bandodkar	Maharashtrawadi Gomantak Party
1972	Krishna Bandodkar	Maharashtrawadi Gomantak Party
1977	Krishna Bandodkar	Maharashtrawadi Gomantak Party
1980	Babusso Gaonkar	Maharashtrawadi Gomantak Party
1984	Babusso Gaonkar	Maharashtrawadi Gomantak Party
1989	Ravi S. Naik	Maharashtrawadi Gomantak Party
1994	Shripad Yesso Naik	Bharatiya Janata Party
1999	Sudin Dhavalikar	Maharashtrawadi Gomantak Party
2002	Sudin Dhavalikar	Maharashtrawadi Gomantak Party
2007	Sudin Dhavalikar	Maharashtrawadi Gomantak Party
2012	Sudin Dhavalikar	Maharashtrawadi Gomantak Party
2017	Sudin Dhavalikar	Maharashtrawadi Gomantak Party
2022	Sudin Dhavalikar	Maharashtrawadi Gomantak Party

== Election results ==
=== 2027 Assembly election ===
2027 Goa Legislative Assembly election: Marcaim
Party	Candidate	Votes	%	±%
INC				
NDA				
NOTA	None of the above			
Majority				
Turnout				
gain from		Swing		

=== 2022 ===
Goa Legislative Assembly Election, 2022: Marcaim
Party	Candidate	Votes	%	±%
MGP	Sudin Dhavalikar	13,963	58.86	
BJP	Sudesh Bhingi	4000	16.86	
RGP	Premanand Gaude	3488	14.7	
INC	Lavoo Mamledar	1090	4.59	
AAP	Umesh Tendolkar	419	1.77	
NOTA	None of the Above	373	1.57	
NCP	Ravindra Talaulikar	140	0.59	
Majority				
Turnout		23,722	81.27%	−5.28%
MGP hold		Swing		

=== 2017 ===
Goa Legislative Assembly Election, 2017: Marcaim
Party	Candidate	Votes	%	±%
MGP	Sudin Dhavalikar	17,093	74.38%	+8.44%
BJP	Pradeep Pundalik Shet	3,413	14.85%	+14.85%
INC	Urmila Naik	1,259	5.48%	−28.58%
AAP	Surel Dutta Tilve	971	4.23%	New
NOTA	None of the Above	376	1.64%	+1.64%
Independent	Hanumant Vasant Naik	244	1.06%	N/A
Majority		13,680	58.57%	+26.69%
Turnout		23,356	86.55%	−3.61%
MGP hold		Swing		

=== 2012 ===
2012 Goa Legislative Assembly election: Marcaim
Party	Candidate	Votes	%	±%
MGP	Sudin Dhavalikar	14,952	65.94	
INC	Ritesh Naik	7,722	34.06	
Majority		7,230	31.88	
Turnout		22,674	90.16	
Registered electors		25,149		
MGP hold		Swing		

=== 2007 ===
2007 Goa Legislative Assembly election: Marcaim
Party	Candidate	Votes	%	±%
MGP	Sudin Dhavalikar	12,141	63.30	
INC	Govind Gaude	4,532	23.63	
BJP	Sadanand Naik	1,647	8.59	
Independent	Ramchandra Naik Mule	549	2.86	
Independent	Hanumant Naik	310	1.62	
Majority		7,609	39.67	
Turnout		19,179	77.49	
Registered electors		24,750		
MGP hold		Swing		

== See also ==
- List of constituencies of the Goa Legislative Assembly
- North Goa district
