= Siolim Assembly constituency =

Legislative Assembly constituency in Goa State, India

Coordinates: 15.62°N 73.77°E

Siolim
- Constituency No. 6 for the Goa Legislative Assembly

Constituency details
- Country: India
- Region: Western India
- State: Goa
- District: North Goa
- Lok Sabha constituency: North Goa
- Established: 1963
- Total electors: 29,661
- Reservation: None

Member of Legislative Assembly
- 8th Goa Legislative Assembly
- Incumbent Delilah Lobo
- Party: Bharatiya Janata Party

Siolim Assembly constituency is one of the 40 assembly constituencies of Goa, a southern state of India. Siolim is also one of the 20 constituencies that comes under North Goa Lok Sabha constituency. It is part of North Goa district.

== Members of Legislative Assembly ==
Year	Member	Party
1963	Pandurang Purushottam Shirodkar	Maharashtrawadi Gomantak Party
1967	Punaji Achrekar	Maharashtrawadi Gomantak Party
1972	Chandrakant Chodankar	Maharashtrawadi Gomantak Party
1977	Chandrakant Chodankar	Maharashtrawadi Gomantak Party
1980	Chandrakant Chodankar	Independent
1984	Ashok Salgaonkar	Maharashtrawadi Gomantak Party
1989	Ashok Salgaonkar	Maharashtrawadi Gomantak Party
1994	Chandrakant Chodankar	Maharashtrawadi Gomantak Party
1999	Dayanand Mandrekar	Bharatiya Janata Party
2002	Dayanand Mandrekar	Bharatiya Janata Party
2007	Dayanand Mandrekar	Bharatiya Janata Party
2012	Dayanand Mandrekar	Bharatiya Janata Party
2017	Vinoda Paliencar	Goa Forward Party
2022	Delilah Lobo (Note: Elected to Indian National Congress. Switched to BJP in Sept 2022)	Indian National Congress

== Election results ==
=== 2027 Assembly election ===
2027 Goa Legislative Assembly election: Siolim
Party	Candidate	Votes	%	±%
INC				
NDA				
NOTA	None of the above			
Majority				
Turnout				
gain from		Swing		

=== Assembly Election 2022 ===
2022 Goa Legislative Assembly election : Siolim
Party	Candidate	Votes	%	±%
INC	Delilah Lobo	9,699	38.89%	New
BJP	Dayanand Mandrekar	7,972	31.96%	▼5.27
RGP	Gauresh Mandrekar	3,188	12.78%	New
Independent	Patrick Savio Almeida	1,482	5.94%	New
AAP	Vishnu Naik	893	3.58%	▼4.31
Independent	Dattaram Pednekar	464	1.86%	New
Independent	Vinod Dattaram Palyekar	409	1.64%	New
NOTA	None of the Above	206	0.83%	▼0.08
Margin of victory		1,727	6.92%	▲0.79
Turnout		24,940	84.09%	▲0.68
Registered electors		29,660		▲5.29
INC gain from GFP		Swing	▼4.48	

=== Assembly Election 2017 ===
2017 Goa Legislative Assembly election : Siolim
Party	Candidate	Votes	%	±%
GFP	Vinoda Paliencar	10,189	43.36%	New
BJP	Dayanand Mandrekar	8,748	37.23%	▼15.53
AAP	Vishnu Mhaddu Naik	1,854	7.89%	New
Independent	Patrick Savio Almeida	1,497	6.37%	New
GSM	Paresh Raikar	532	2.26%	New
NCP	Abhijit Dhargalkar	275	1.17%	New
NOTA	None of the Above	212	0.90%	New
Margin of victory		1,441	6.13%	▼3.89
Turnout		23,496	83.40%	▲1.17
Registered electors		28,171		▲6.94
GFP gain from BJP		Swing	▼9.39	

=== Assembly Election 2012 ===
2012 Goa Legislative Assembly election : Siolim
Party	Candidate	Votes	%	±%
BJP	Dayanand Mandrekar	11,430	52.76%	▲11.69
INC	Uday Dattaram Paliemkar	9,259	42.74%	New
Samajwadi Janata Party (ChandraShekhar)	Rajan Savlo Ghate	352	1.62%	New
Jai Maha Bharath Party	Abhijit Dhargalkar	274	1.26%	New
Independent	Ratikant Shankar Korgaonkar	254	1.17%	New
Margin of victory		2,171	10.02%	▼1.09
Turnout		21,665	82.12%	▲12.03
Registered electors		26,344		▲2.61
BJP hold		Swing	▲11.69	

=== Assembly Election 2007 ===
2007 Goa Legislative Assembly election : Siolim
Party	Candidate	Votes	%	±%
BJP	Dayanand Mandrekar	7,402	41.07%	▲0.62
Independent	Paliemkar Uday	5,400	29.96%	New
NCP	Marques Milton	3,845	21.33%	▲3.04
Save Goa Front	Fernandes Dorothy	903	5.01%	New
MGP	Dabolkar Kiran	223	1.24%	▼1.74
Independent	Sawant Mukesh M.	172	0.95%	New
Margin of victory		2,002	11.11%	▲0.32
Turnout		18,025	70.21%	▼0.63
Registered electors		25,674		▲2.86
BJP hold		Swing	▲0.62	

=== Assembly Election 2002 ===
2002 Goa Legislative Assembly election : Siolim
Party	Candidate	Votes	%	±%
BJP	Dayanand Mandrekar	7,152	40.45%	▲13.33
INC	Fernandes Francis Gregorio	5,245	29.66%	▲7.36
NCP	Chodankar Chandrakant	3,235	18.30%	New
MGP	Polle Pandharinath Vaman	527	2.98%	New
Independent	Jawaharlal Henriques	387	2.19%	New
CPI	Christopher Fonseca	377	2.13%	New
Independent	Narvekar Sanjay Ganesh	347	1.96%	New
Margin of victory		1,907	10.78%	▲5.96
Turnout		17,682	70.76%	▲3.76
Registered electors		24,961		▲1.93
BJP hold		Swing	▲13.33	

=== Assembly Election 1999 ===
1999 Goa Legislative Assembly election : Siolim
Party	Candidate	Votes	%	±%
BJP	Dayanand Mandrekar	4,455	27.12%	New
INC	Marques Milton Olympio	3,663	22.30%	New
Goa Rajiv Congress Party	Chodankar Chandrakant Uttam	3,346	20.37%	New
Independent	Fernandes Francis Gregorio	2,641	16.08%	New
Independent	Naik Salgaonkar Ashok Tukaram	1,905	11.60%	New
SS	Parsekar Vikas Madan	336	2.05%	New
Margin of victory		792	4.82%	▼7.38
Turnout		16,427	67.06%	▼7.09
Registered electors		24,489		▲8.34
BJP gain from MGP		Swing	▼16.86	

=== Assembly Election 1994 ===
1994 Goa Legislative Assembly election : Siolim
Party	Candidate	Votes	%	±%
MGP	Chandrakant Chodankar	7,373	43.98%	▲0.01
INC	Ashok Salgaonkar	5,327	31.77%	New
Independent	Fernandes Francis Gregorio	2,984	17.80%	New
Independent	Palyekar Keshav Shambhu	512	3.05%	New
BSP	Naik Bhalchandra Ganesh	199	1.19%	New
Margin of victory		2,046	12.20%	▲12.12
Turnout		16,765	73.17%	▼1.27
Registered electors		22,603		▲16.47
MGP hold		Swing	▲0.01	

=== Assembly Election 1989 ===
1989 Goa Legislative Assembly election : Siolim
Party	Candidate	Votes	%	±%
MGP	Ashok Salgaonkar	6,438	43.97%	▲4.65
INC	Chandrakant Chodankar	6,425	43.88%	New
Independent	Narquis Milten Olompia	1,173	8.01%	New
Independent	Shirodkar Madhukar Raoji	107	0.73%	New
Margin of victory		13	0.09%	▼4.96
Turnout		14,641	73.44%	▲0.88
Registered electors		19,407		▼4.65
MGP hold		Swing	▲4.65	

=== Assembly Election 1984 ===
1984 Goa, Daman and Diu Legislative Assembly election : Siolim
Party	Candidate	Votes	%	±%
MGP	Ashok Salgaonkar	5,967	39.32%	New
INC	Chandrakant Chodankar	5,201	34.27%	New
Independent	Naik Gopi Dattaram	2,188	14.42%	New
Independent	Kalangutkar Sham Pundolik	407	2.78%	New
Independent	Bhonsle Madhukar Ramnath	329	2.25%	New
Independent	Joshi Damodar Vaman	288	1.97%	New
Independent	D'Souza Francis Lawrence	147	1.00%	New
Margin of victory		766	5.05%	▼8.35
Turnout		15,176	72.43%	▲4.08
Registered electors		20,354		▲9.41
MGP gain from Independent		Swing	▼5.23	

=== Assembly Election 1980 ===
1980 Goa, Daman and Diu Legislative Assembly election : Siolim
Party	Candidate	Votes	%	±%
Independent	Chandrakant Chodankar	5,841	44.55%	New
MGP	Salgaukar Ladu Buthi	4,084	31.15%	
INC(I)	Mandrekar Ramkrishna Narsinv	1,044	7.96%	New
Independent	Gadekar Sadanand Mahadev	712	5.43%	New
JP(S)	Fernandes Silvestre Loyola Epiganio N.	423	3.23%	New
JP	Naik Kanoba Yeshwant	267	2.04%	New
Independent	Palyenkar Shambu Naguesh	232	1.77%	New
Margin of victory		1,757	13.40%	▼11.13
Turnout		13,111	67.75%	▲4.97
Registered electors		18,603		▲3.91
Independent gain from MGP		Swing	▼7.36	

=== Assembly Election 1977 ===
1977 Goa, Daman and Diu Legislative Assembly election : Siolim
Party	Candidate	Votes	%	±%
MGP	Chandrakant Chodankar	6,088	51.91%	▲1.29
JP	Punaji Achrekar	3,211	27.38%	New
INC	Goltekar Ramesh Shabi	2,255	19.23%	New
Margin of victory		2,877	24.53%	▲16.91
Turnout		11,727	64.54%	▼11.21
Registered electors		17,903		▲23.32
MGP hold		Swing	▲1.29	

=== Assembly Election 1972 ===
1972 Goa, Daman and Diu Legislative Assembly election : Siolim
Party	Candidate	Votes	%	±%
MGP	Chandrakant Chodankar	5,638	50.62%	▲1.64
UGP	S. Souzaw A. Tito Fermina	4,789	43.00%	New
Independent	Gajanand Rayu Naik	387	3.47%	New
Independent	Rocky Francis Leo Dias	117	1.05%	New
MGP	Chandrakant N. Parulekar	44	0.40%	
Margin of victory		849	7.62%	▲1.76
Turnout		11,137	75.60%	▲1.31
Registered electors		14,518		▲3.61
MGP hold		Swing	▲1.64	

=== Assembly Election 1967 ===
1967 Goa, Daman and Diu Legislative Assembly election : Siolim
Party	Candidate	Votes	%	±%
MGP	Punaji Achrekar	5,175	48.98%	New
UGP	D. Zeferino	4,556	43.12%	New
Independent	S. P. Purushottam	354	3.35%	New
Independent	C. K. Narayan	132	1.25%	New
Independent	D. A. Prabhu	50	0.47%	New
Independent	J. F. Santan	12	0.11%	New
Margin of victory		619	5.86%	
Turnout		10,565	73.36%	
Registered electors		14,012		
MGP win (new seat)				

== See also ==
- List of constituencies of the Goa Legislative Assembly
- North Goa district
