= Margao Assembly constituency =

Legislative Assembly constituency in Goa State, India

Coordinates: 15.28°N 73.99°E

Margao
- Constituency No. 31 for the Goa Legislative Assembly

Constituency details
- Country: India
- Region: Western India
- State: Goa
- District: South Goa
- Lok Sabha constituency: South Goa
- Established: 1963
- Total electors: 29,508
- Reservation: None

Member of Legislative Assembly
- 8th Goa Legislative Assembly
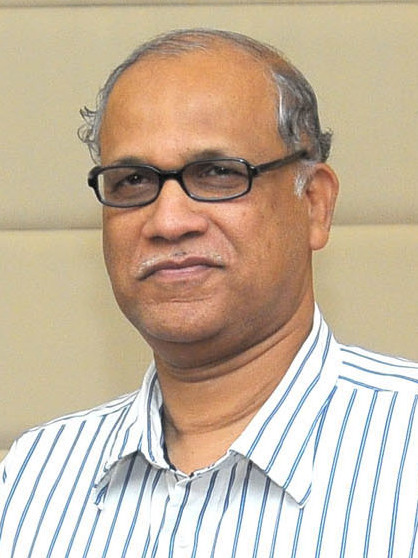
- Incumbent Digambar Kamat; Former Chief Minister of Goa
- Party: BJP

Margao Assembly constituency is one of the 40 Goa Legislative Assembly constituencies of the state of Goa in southern India. Margao is also one of the 20 constituencies falling under South Goa Lok Sabha constituency.

== Members of Legislative Assembly ==
Year	Member	Party
1963	Vasudeo Narayan Sarmalkar	United Goans Party
1967	Babu Naik	United Goans Party
1972	Babu Naik	United Goans Party
1977	Babu Naik	Indian National Congress
1980	Babu Naik	Indian National Congress
1984	Uday Bhembre	Independent
1989	Babu Naik	Independent
1994	Digambar Kamat (Note: Elected as Indian National Congress. Switched to BJP in Sept 2022)	Bharatiya Janata Party
1999	Digambar Kamat	Bharatiya Janata Party
2002	Digambar Kamat	Bharatiya Janata Party
2007	Digambar Kamat	Indian National Congress
2012	Digambar Kamat	Indian National Congress
2017	Digambar Kamat	Indian National Congress
2022	Digambar Kamat	Indian National Congress

== Election results ==
=== 2027 Assembly election ===
2027 Goa Legislative Assembly election: Margao
Party	Candidate	Votes	%	±%
INC				
NDA				
NOTA	None of the above			
Majority				
Turnout				
gain from		Swing		

=== 2022 ===
Goa Legislative Assembly Election, 2022: Margao
Party	Candidate	Votes	%	±%
INC	Digambar Kamat	13.674	60.42	
BJP	Manohar Ajgaonkar	5,880	25.98	
AAP	Lincoln Vaz	1,173	5.18	
AITC	Mahesh Amonkar	923	4.08	
RGP	Sashiraj Naik Shirodkar	722	3.19	
NOTA	None of the Above	261	1.15	
Majority		7,794	34.44	
Turnout		22,633	74.84	
Registered electors		29,508		
INC hold		Swing		

=== 2017 ===
Goa Legislative Assembly Election, 2017: Margao
Party	Candidate	Votes	%	±%
INC	Digambar Kamat	12,105		
BJP	Sharmad Raiturkar	7,929		
AAP	Santosh Raiturkar	1832		
MGP	Jayesh Raghunath Naik	216		
None of the Above	None of the Above	271		
Majority		4,176		
Turnout				
Registered electors		28,457		
INC hold		Swing		

== See also ==
- List of constituencies of the Goa Legislative Assembly
- South Goa district
