= Calangute Assembly constituency =

Legislative Assembly constituency in Goa State, India

Coordinates: 15.54°N 73.77°E

Calangute
- Constituency No. 8 for the Goa Legislative Assembly

Constituency details
- Country: India
- Region: Western India
- State: Goa
- District: North Goa
- Lok Sabha constituency: North Goa
- Established: 1963
- Total electors: 25,632
- Reservation: None

Member of Legislative Assembly
- 8th Goa Legislative Assembly
- Incumbent Michael Lobo
- Party: Bharatiya Janata Party

Calangute Assembly constituency is one of the 40 Goa Legislative Assembly constituencies of the state of Goa in southern India. Calangute is also one of the 20 constituencies falling under North Goa Lok Sabha constituency.

It is part of North Goa district.

== Members of Legislative Assembly ==
Year	Member	Party
1963	John D'Souza	United Goans Party
1967	Sequeira Valente	United Goans Party
1972	Jagdish Bhujang Rao	United Goans Party
1977	Raul Fernandes	Maharashtrawadi Gomantak Party
1980	Wilfred de Souza	Indian National Congress
1984	Shrikant Malik	Maharashtrawadi Gomantak Party
1989	Suresh Parulekar	Indian National Congress
1994	Tomazinho Cardozo	Indian National Congress
1999	Suresh Parulekar	United Goans Democratic Party
2002	Agnelo Fernandes	Indian National Congress
2007	Agnelo Fernandes	Indian National Congress
2012	Michael Lobo	Bharatiya Janata Party
2017	Michael Lobo	Bharatiya Janata Party
2022	Michael Lobo	Indian National Congress (Note: Elected as Indian National Congress. Switched to BJP in Sept 2022)

== Election results ==
=== 2027 Assembly election ===
2027 Goa Legislative Assembly election: Calangute
Party	Candidate	Votes	%	±%
INC				
NDA				
NOTA	None of the above			
Majority				
Turnout				
gain from		Swing		

=== Assembly Election 2022 ===
2022 Goa Legislative Assembly election : Calangute
Party	Candidate	Votes	%	±%
INC	Michael Lobo	9,285	45.07%	▲8.67
BJP	Joseph Robert Sequeira	4,306	20.90%	▼34.55
RGP	Marcelino Francisco Gonsalves	2,538	12.32%	New
AAP	Sudesh Suresh Mayekar	1,769	8.59%	▲1.29
AITC	Anthony Menezes	1,690	8.20%	New
Goencho Swabhiman Party	Roshan Luke Mathias	561	2.72%	New
Independent	Ricardo D'Souza	268	1.30%	New
NOTA	None of the Above	173	0.84%	▼0.02
Margin of victory		4,979	24.17%	▲5.12
Turnout		20,602	79.65%	▼1.46
Registered electors		25,632		▲4.45
INC gain from BJP		Swing	▼10.38	

=== Assembly Election 2017 ===
2017 Goa Legislative Assembly election : Calangute
Party	Candidate	Votes	%	±%
BJP	Michael Lobo	11,136	55.45%	▲1.55
INC	Joseph Robert Sequeira	7,311	36.40%	▼7.31
AAP	Godwin Fernandes	1,465	7.29%	New
NOTA	None of the Above	172	0.86%	New
Margin of victory		3,825	19.05%	▲8.86
Turnout		20,084	81.84%	▼0.90
Registered electors		24,541		▲10.65
BJP hold		Swing	▲1.55	

=== Assembly Election 2012 ===
2012 Goa Legislative Assembly election : Calangute
Party	Candidate	Votes	%	±%
BJP	Michael Lobo	9,891	53.90%	▲26.31
INC	Agnelo Nicholas Fernandes	8,022	43.72%	▲1.07
Independent	Jose Paul Menino Silveira	240	1.31%	New
Independent	Ashley Francisco Gomes	195	1.06%	New
Margin of victory		1,869	10.19%	▼3.97
Turnout		18,350	82.73%	▲12.64
Registered electors		22,178		▼20.30
BJP gain from INC		Swing	▲11.25	

=== Assembly Election 2007 ===
2007 Goa Legislative Assembly election : Calangute
Party	Candidate	Votes	%	±%
INC	Agnelo Fernandes	8,319	42.65%	▼10.65
UGDP	Joseph Sequeira	5,558	28.50%	New
BJP	Malik Anjali Shrikant	5,381	27.59%	▼14.35
CPI	Naik Gajanan	243	1.25%	▼0.20
Margin of victory		2,761	14.16%	▲2.79
Turnout		19,505	70.08%	▲1.55
Registered electors		27,826		▲4.69
INC hold		Swing	▼10.65	

=== Assembly Election 2002 ===
2002 Goa Legislative Assembly election : Calangute
Party	Candidate	Votes	%	±%
INC	Fernandes Agnelo	9,711	53.30%	▲11.47
BJP	Suresh Vishwanath Parulekar	7,641	41.94%	▲33.97
CPI	Naik Gajanan Rama	263	1.44%	New
NCP	D'Souza Urban	243	1.33%	New
Goa Su-Raj Party	Noranha Edwin Francis Joseph	230	1.26%	New
SS	Nagvekar Pundalik Manmohan	124	0.68%	New
Margin of victory		2,070	11.36%	▲6.83
Turnout		18,220	68.52%	▲2.21
Registered electors		26,580		▲6.57
INC gain from UGDP		Swing	▲6.94	

=== Assembly Election 1999 ===
1999 Goa Legislative Assembly election : Calangute
Party	Candidate	Votes	%	±%
UGDP	Parulekar Suresh Vishwanath	7,670	46.36%	New
INC	Tomazinho Cardozo	6,921	41.83%	▼8.07
BJP	Korgaonkar Rajendra Vasant	1,318	7.97%	New
Independent	Salgaonkar Vinayak Dattaram	635	3.84%	New
Margin of victory		749	4.53%	▼21.15
Turnout		16,546	66.33%	▼4.70
Registered electors		24,941		▲14.57
UGDP gain from INC		Swing	▼3.54	

=== Assembly Election 1994 ===
1994 Goa Legislative Assembly election : Calangute
Party	Candidate	Votes	%	±%
INC	Tomazinho Cardozo	7,716	49.90%	▲0.54
Independent	Parulekar Suresh Vishwanath	3,746	24.22%	New
MGP	Naik Ravindra Bhikaro	2,592	16.76%	New
Independent	Souza Fransico Vaveinio	1,045	6.76%	New
Margin of victory		3,970	25.67%	▲24.05
Turnout		15,464	70.09%	▼3.48
Registered electors		21,769		▲11.49
INC hold		Swing	▲0.54	

=== Assembly Election 1989 ===
1989 Goa Legislative Assembly election : Calangute
Party	Candidate	Votes	%	±%
INC	Parulekar Suresh Vishwanath	7,182	49.36%	New
MGP	Malik Surikant Keshav	6,946	47.74%	
Gomantak Lok Pox	D. Ricardo Minguel Mascarenhas	117	0.80%	New
Margin of victory		236	1.62%	▲0.16
Turnout		14,551	72.95%	▲1.65
Registered electors		19,526		▼9.62
INC gain from MGP		Swing		

=== Assembly Election 1984 ===
1984 Goa, Daman and Diu Legislative Assembly election : Calangute
Party	Candidate	Votes	%	±%
MGP	Malik Shrikant Keshav	5,995	38.08%	New
Independent	Wilfred de Souza	5,765	36.62%	New
INC	Shirodkar Venkatesh Ramachandra	3,322	21.10%	New
Independent	D'Souza Vilma Julio	313	2.15%	New
Margin of victory		230	1.46%	▼8.50
Turnout		15,744	71.39%	▲2.22
Registered electors		21,605		▲7.58
MGP gain from INC(U)		Swing	▼10.69	

=== Assembly Election 1980 ===
1980 Goa, Daman and Diu Legislative Assembly election : Calangute
Party	Candidate	Votes	%	±%
INC(U)	Wilfred de Souza	6,920	48.77%	New
MGP	D'Souza Francisco Agusta	5,506	38.80%	
JP(S)	Achrenkar Punaji Pandurang	471	3.32%	New
Independent	Andredes Frank Rafael Paul Domnic Francis	294	2.07%	New
JP	Naik Balchandra Ganesh	251	1.77%	New
Margin of victory		1,414	9.96%	▲7.56
Turnout		14,190	67.55%	▲7.76
Registered electors		20,083		▲6.17
INC(U) gain from MGP		Swing	▲9.93	

=== Assembly Election 1977 ===
1977 Goa, Daman and Diu Legislative Assembly election : Calangute
Party	Candidate	Votes	%	±%
MGP	Fernandes Rual Ilario	4,621	38.84%	New
JP	Fernandes Mark A. Anselmo	4,335	36.43%	New
INC	Rao Jagdish Dhujang	2,741	23.04%	New
Margin of victory		286	2.40%	▼2.64
Turnout		11,898	62.16%	▼11.74
Registered electors		18,916		▲17.37
MGP gain from UGP		Swing	▼11.30	

=== Assembly Election 1972 ===
1972 Goa, Daman and Diu Legislative Assembly election : Calangute
Party	Candidate	Votes	%	±%
UGP	Jagdish Bhujang Rao	6,032	50.14%	▼3.11
MGP	D. Cruz Anthony Manuel	5,425	45.10%	New
Independent	Fernandes S. Loiolo	366	3.04%	New
Margin of victory		607	5.05%	▼9.22
Turnout		12,030	73.36%	▼0.99
Registered electors		16,117		▲2.55
UGP hold		Swing	▼3.11	

=== Assembly Election 1967 ===
1967 Goa, Daman and Diu Legislative Assembly election : Calangute
Party	Candidate	Votes	%	±%
UGP	S. Valente	6,329	53.25%	New
MGP	M. R. Dharma	4,633	38.98%	New
United Goans Party (Furtado Group)	V. S. Souza	246	2.07%	New
Independent	M. A. Fernandes	182	1.53%	New
Independent	F. A. Domingos	137	1.15%	New
Margin of victory		1,696	14.27%	
Turnout		11,886	74.17%	
Registered electors		15,716		
UGP win (new seat)				

== See also ==
- List of constituencies of the Goa Legislative Assembly
- North Goa district
