= Ponda Assembly constituency =

Legislative Assembly constituency in Goa State, India

Coordinates: 15.4°N 74.01°E

Ponda
- Constituency No. 21 for the Goa Legislative Assembly

Constituency details
- Country: India
- Region: Western India
- State: Goa
- District: North Goa
- Lok Sabha constituency: South Goa
- Established: 1963
- Total electors: 27,927
- Reservation: None

Member of Legislative Assembly
- 8th Goa Legislative Assembly
- Incumbent Vacant

Ponda Assembly constituency is one of the 40 Goa Legislative Assembly constituencies of the state of Goa in southern India. Ponda is also one of the 20 constituencies falling under South Goa Lok Sabha constituency.

== Members of Legislative Assembly ==
Year	Member	Party
1963	Gajanan Raikar	Maharashtrawadi Gomantak Party
1967	Shashikala Kakodkar	Maharashtrawadi Gomantak Party
1972	Rhoidas Naik	Maharashtrawadi Gomantak Party
1977	Rhoidas Naik	Maharashtrawadi Gomantak Party
1980	Aguiar Joildo Souza	Indian National Congress
1984	Ravi Naik	Maharashtrawadi Gomantak Party
1989	Shivdas Verekar	Maharashtrawadi Gomantak Party
1994	Shivdas Verekar	Maharashtrawadi Gomantak Party
1999	Ravi Naik	Indian National Congress
2002	Ravi Naik	Indian National Congress
2007	Ravi Naik	Indian National Congress
2012	Lavoo Mamledar	Maharashtrawadi Gomantak Party
2017	Ravi Naik	Indian National Congress
2022	Ravi Naik	Bharatiya Janata Party

== Election results ==
=== 2027 Assembly election ===
2027 Goa Legislative Assembly election: Ponda
Party	Candidate	Votes	%	±%
INC	Ketan Prabhu Bhatikar			
NDA				
NOTA	None of the above			
Majority				
Turnout				
gain from		Swing		

=== Assembly Election 2022 ===
2022 Goa Legislative Assembly election : Ponda
Party	Candidate	Votes	%	±%
BJP	Ravi Naik	7,514	29.08%	▲3.21
MGP	Ketan Prabhu Bhatikar	7,437	28.78%	▲13.65
INC	Rajesh Verenkar	6,839	26.46%	▼11.40
RGP	Sanish Tilve	1,770	6.85%	New
IND	Sandeep Sinai Khandeparkar	1,237	4.79%	New
AAP	Surel Tilve	620	2.40%	▲0.32
NOTA	None of the Above	292	1.13%	▲0.12
Margin of victory		77	0.30%	▼11.70
Turnout		25,842	79.32%	▼1.74
Registered electors		32,160		▲5.21
BJP gain from INC		Swing	▼8.79	

=== Assembly Election 2017 ===
2017 Goa Legislative Assembly election : Ponda
Party	Candidate	Votes	%	±%
INC	Ravi Naik	9,502	37.86%	▼2.90
BJP	Sunil Desai	6,492	25.87%	New
[[IND|Independent]]	Rajesh Verekar	4,529	18.05%	New
MGP	Lavoo Mamledar	3,796	15.13%	▼39.37
AAP	Mulla Mansur Muzawar	522	2.08%	New
NOTA	None of the Above	254	1.01%	New
Margin of victory		3,010	11.99%	▼1.74
Turnout		25,095	82.10%	▲0.84
Registered electors		30,568		▲6.90
INC gain from MGP		Swing	▼16.63	

=== Assembly Election 2012 ===
2012 Goa Legislative Assembly election : Ponda
Party	Candidate	Votes	%	±%
MGP	Lavoo Mamledar	12,662	54.50%	▲20.70
INC	Ravi Naik	9,472	40.77%	▲0.24
AITC	Sayad Imtiyaz	502	2.16%	New
UGDP	Gitesh Gokuldas Naik	223	0.96%	New
Independent	Mohan Govind Naik	189	0.81%	New
Margin of victory		3,190	13.73%	▲7.00
Turnout		23,234	81.24%	▲14.87
Registered electors		28,594		▼22.86
MGP gain from INC		Swing	▲13.97	

=== Assembly Election 2007 ===
2007 Goa Legislative Assembly election : Ponda
Party	Candidate	Votes	%	±%
INC	Ravi Naik	9,972	40.53%	▼9.62
MGP	Mamledar Lavoo	8,316	33.80%	▲32.63
BJP	Khandeparkar Sandeep	5,940	24.14%	▼19.84
JD(S)	Dias Santan	329	1.34%	New
Margin of victory		1,656	6.73%	▲0.57
Turnout		24,606	66.25%	▼1.32
Registered electors		37,068		▲17.11
INC hold		Swing	▼9.62	

=== Assembly Election 2002 ===
2002 Goa Legislative Assembly election : Ponda
Party	Candidate	Votes	%	±%
INC	Ravi Naik	10,745	50.14%	▲1.56
BJP	Naik Shripad Yasso	9,425	43.98%	▲16.38
SS	Naik Rohidas Harischandra	611	2.85%	▲2.01
MGP	Naik Deelipkumar Vishwanath	251	1.17%	▼13.92
Margin of victory		1,320	6.16%	▼14.81
Turnout		21,428	67.51%	▲0.72
Registered electors		31,651		▲10.17
INC hold		Swing	▲1.56	

=== Assembly Election 1999 ===
1999 Goa Legislative Assembly election : Ponda
Party	Candidate	Votes	%	±%
INC	Ravi Naik	9,349	48.58%	New
BJP	Khedekar Yeshwant Uttam	5,313	27.61%	New
MGP	Shet Verekar Shivadas Atmaram	2,905	15.10%	▼26.53
Independent	Aguiar Joildo Joao	1,063	5.52%	New
SS	Naik Ankush Babuli	162	0.84%	New
Independent	Sitaram Balkrishna Kamat	149	0.77%	New
Margin of victory		4,036	20.97%	▲9.09
Turnout		19,244	66.79%	▲1.12
Registered electors		28,730		▲13.65
INC gain from MGP		Swing	▲6.95	

=== Assembly Election 1994 ===
1994 Goa Legislative Assembly election : Ponda
Party	Candidate	Votes	%	±%
MGP	Shivdas Verekar	6,931	41.63%	▼0.84
Independent	Aguiar Joild Joao	4,953	29.75%	New
INC	Sulochana Ramakant Katkar	3,751	22.53%	New
BSP	Tilve Umesh Pandurang	339	2.04%	New
Independent	Naik Prakash Vishnu	257	1.54%	New
Margin of victory		1,978	11.88%	▼1.42
Turnout		16,649	64.70%	▼2.08
Registered electors		25,279		▲17.41
MGP hold		Swing	▼0.84	

=== Assembly Election 1989 ===
1989 Goa Legislative Assembly election : Ponda
Party	Candidate	Votes	%	±%
MGP	Shivdas Verekar	6,212	42.47%	▼2.48
INC	Naik Mohan Govind	4,267	29.17%	New
Independent	Sahakari Madhav Atmaram	2,022	13.82%	New
BJP	Sunal Narayan Desai	573	3.92%	New
Independent	Khanolkar Mahadev Satchit	484	3.31%	New
Independent	Mulla Zahirluddin Mirza	282	1.93%	New
Independent	Parkar Prakash Shanu	239	1.63%	New
Margin of victory		1,945	13.30%	▼2.66
Turnout		14,628	66.59%	▼9.05
Registered electors		21,530		▲0.90
MGP hold		Swing	▼2.48	

=== Assembly Election 1984 ===
1984 Goa, Daman and Diu Legislative Assembly election : Ponda
Party	Candidate	Votes	%	±%
MGP	Ravi Naik	7,384	44.95%	New
INC	Naik Gaunekar Anil Norsu	4,762	28.99%	New
Independent	Prabu Ramchandra Tukaram	2,655	16.16%	New
Independent	Fonseca Anthonyu Joseph	666	4.55%	New
BJP	Korde Madhav Shivram	282	1.93%	New
Independent	Kamat Ravindra Pandurang	111	0.76%	New
Margin of victory		2,622	15.96%	▲11.15
Turnout		16,428	74.98%	▲4.04
Registered electors		21,338		▲8.34
MGP gain from INC(U)		Swing	▼1.69	

=== Assembly Election 1980 ===
1980 Goa, Daman and Diu Legislative Assembly election : Ponda
Party	Candidate	Votes	%	±%
INC(U)	Aguiar Joildo Souza	6,700	46.63%	New
MGP	Ravi Naik	6,009	41.83%	
Independent	Sinai Usgaonkar Attchut Kashiram	618	4.30%	New
JP	Chari Ramesh Govind	496	3.45%	New
CPI(M)	Khandekar Shankar Krishna	202	1.41%	New
Margin of victory		691	4.81%	▲1.80
Turnout		14,367	71.21%	▲2.01
Registered electors		19,695		▲34.51
INC(U) gain from MGP		Swing	▲0.91	

=== Assembly Election 1977 ===
1977 Goa, Daman and Diu Legislative Assembly election : Ponda
Party	Candidate	Votes	%	±%
MGP	Rhoidas Naik	4,749	45.72%	▼11.57
INC	Aguiar Joildo Souza	4,436	42.71%	New
JP	Gajanan Raikar	952	9.17%	New
Independent	Shinkre Janaradan Jagannath	134	1.29%	New
Margin of victory		313	3.01%	▼32.89
Turnout		10,387	70.15%	▼3.76
Registered electors		14,642		▲3.54
MGP hold		Swing	▼11.57	

=== Assembly Election 1972 ===
1972 Goa, Daman and Diu Legislative Assembly election : Ponda
Party	Candidate	Votes	%	±%
MGP	Rhoidas Naik	6,052	57.29%	▼17.18
MGP	Vishwanath Yeshwant Naik	2,259	21.38%	
UGP	R Yeshvanta Laximan Pai	1,152	10.90%	New
INC	Ghanekar J Hira Nath	784	7.42%	New
ABJS	Savant Guiri Venctesh	107	1.01%	New
Independent	Sincre Jaganath	26	0.25%	New
Margin of victory		3,793	35.90%	▼22.23
Turnout		10,564	73.40%	▲4.20
Registered electors		14,141		▲3.93
MGP hold		Swing	▼17.18	

=== Assembly Election 1967 ===
1967 Goa, Daman and Diu Legislative Assembly election : Ponda
Party	Candidate	Votes	%	±%
MGP	Shashikala Kakodkar	7,144	74.47%	New
UGP	K. S. Dattatray	1,567	16.33%	New
Independent	T. D. Purushotam	266	2.77%	New
PSP	R. G. Gopinath	152	1.58%	New
Independent	N. G. B. Jotkar	127	1.32%	New
Independent	S. M. Pudmhanabha	63	0.66%	New
Margin of victory		5,577	58.14%	
Turnout		9,593	68.49%	
Registered electors		13,606		
MGP win (new seat)				

== See also ==
- List of constituencies of the Goa Legislative Assembly
- North Goa district
