= Babu Naik =

Indian politician and businessman

Member of Goa, Daman and Diu Legislative Assembly
- In office 1967–1984
- Preceded by: Vasudeo Narayan Sarmalkar
- Succeeded by: Uday Bhembre
- Constituency: Margao

Member of Goa Legislative Assembly
- In office 1989–1994
- Preceded by: Uday Bhembre
- Succeeded by: Digambar Kamat
- Constituency: Margao

Leader of the Opposition, Goa, Daman and Diu Legislative Assembly
- In office 1977–1979
- Preceded by: Jack de Sequeira
- Succeeded by: Ramakant Khalap

Personal details
- Born: Anant Narcinva Naik; 19 August 1927 Ponda, Goa, Portuguese India

Anant Narcinva "Babu" Naik (19 August 1927 – unknown) was an Indian politician and businessman who served as Leader of the Opposition in the Goa, Daman and Diu Legislative Assembly from 1977 to 1979. He previously served as a five-term member of the Goa, Daman and Diu Legislative Assembly, representing the Margao constituency from 1967 to 1984, and lastly from 1989 to 1994. He established the PANNaik Group in 1985.
