= Vinod Palyekar =

Indian politician

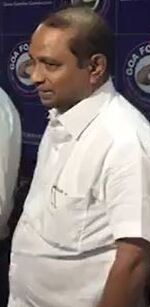
- Paliencar in 2017

Minister of Water Resources Department Government of Goa
- In office 2017–2019
- Chief minister: Manohar Parrikar
- Preceded by: Dayanand Mandrekar

Minister of Fisheries Government of Goa
- In office 14 March 2017 – 24 March 2019
- Chief minister: Manohar Parrikar
- Preceded by: Avertano Furtado

Member of the Goa Legislative Assembly
- In office 2017–2022
- Preceded by: Dayanand Mandrekar
- Succeeded by: Delilah Lobo
- Constituency: Siolim

Personal details
- Born: Vinoda Datarama Paliencar Goa, India
- Party: Independent
- Other political affiliations: Goa Forward Party (2016–2022)
- Education: Akhil Bharatiya Gandharva Mahavidyalaya Mandal
- Occupation: Politician
- Profession: Businessman

Vinoda Datarama Paliencar, better known as Vinod Palyekar, is an Indian politician and businessman who is a former cabinet minister in the Government of Goa. He is also a former Member of the Goa Legislative Assembly representing Siolim from 2017 to 2022, and belongs to the Goa Forward Party. Paliencar was the Minister for Fisheries and Water Resources Department. He is a classical singer. Paliencar is the in-charge of the OBC wing of the Goa Forward Party.

== Early life ==
Vinoda Datarama Paliencar obtained a Bachelor of Arts degree in classical music in 1988 from the Akhil Bharatiya Gandharva Mahavidyalaya Mandal in Miraj, Maharashtra. Paliencar is a disciple of Pandit Jitendra Abhisheki.

== Political career ==
Paliencar served as a panch of the Siolim-Marna Panchayat. His brother Uday Paliencar had unsuccessfully contested the 2012 Goa Legislative Assembly election as a candidate of the Indian National Congress from the Siolim constituency.

Paliencar quit the Indian National Congress to join the Goa Forward Party on 11 October 2016. He contested the 2017 Goa Legislative Assembly election as a candidate of the Goa Forward Party from the Siolim constituency and defeated the Bharatiya Janata Party's Dayanand Mandrekar who was elected from Siolim for continuous four terms and was considered a political heavyweight. On 12 July 2017, Paliencar was appointed the in-charge of the OBC wing of the Goa Forward Party.

=== Cabinet Minister ===
After the Bharatiya Janata Party led by Manohar Parrikar formed the government after the 2017 Assembly elections with the support of the Goa forward, Paliencar was sworn in as a cabinet Minister on 14 March 2017. He was allotted the portfolios of Fisheries and Water Resources Department.

After being appointed a cabinet Minister paid a surprise visit to the Water Resources Department's office at Porvorim and found that while some officials were not present in the office, others were sleeping during office hours. A memorandum was served to the erring officials. Paliencar demanded a complete ban on rave parties on Goa's beaches and alleged there the police were turning a blind eye to such parties. Paliencar said in an interview that he was 'pressurized' for his stand against the late night rave parties.

Paliencar introduced a scheme named Nital Goem, Nital Baim under which the Water Resources Department shall provide subsidy up to Rs. 50,000/- for the rejuvenation of wells in Goa.

==== Stance on Mhadei river ====
After the controversy resulting out of Chief Minister of Goa Manohar Parrikar's letter to the Karnataka BJP President B. S. Yeddyurappa, Paliencar suggested that Parrikar's letter was a political stunt and categorically stated that (we will) not give a single drop of (Mhadei's) water to Karnataka.

== Controversy ==
After visiting the Kalasa-Banduri Nala project site on 13 January 2018, Paliencar while accusing Karnataka of diverting the water of Mhadei river referred to the people of Karnataka as harami but later admitted that he had used the expletive at the spur of the moment. He requested the media to expunge the abusive word.

Paliencar's comments sparked protests in Karnataka and political leaders including Chief Minister Siddaramaiah and Karnataka BJP President B. S. Yeddyurappa demanded an apology. After an outrage of social media and demands for an apology, Paliencar through his Twitter account claimed that The so-called abusive words were misquoted & reported by Journalist without being present for press conference.
