= Digambar Kamat =

Indian politician (born 1954)

Digamber Kamat
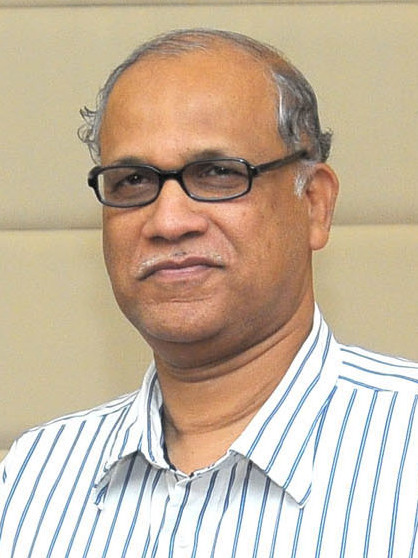
- Kamat in 2010

Cabinet Minister Government of Goa
- Incumbent
- Assumed office 21 August 2025
- Chief Minister: Pramod Sawant

Leader of the Opposition, Goa Legislative Assembly
- In office 18 July 2019 – 31 March 2022
- Governor: Mridula Sinha; Satya Pal Malik; Bhagat Singh Koshiyari (Additional charge); P. S. Sreedharan Pillai
- Chief Minister: Pramod Sawant
- Preceded by: Chandrakant Kavlekar,
- Succeeded by: Michael Lobo

Member of the Goa Legislative Assembly
- Incumbent
- Assumed office 1994
- Preceded by: Babu Naik
- Constituency: Margao

9th Chief Minister of Goa
- In office 8 June 2007 – 9 March 2012
- Preceded by: Pratapsingh Rane
- Succeeded by: Manohar Parrikar

Personal details
- Born: 8 March 1954 (age 72) Margão, Goa, Portuguese India
- Party: Bharatiya Janata party (1994–2005, 2022–present)
- Other political affiliations: Indian National Congress (1989–1994, 2005–2022)
- Spouse: Asha Kamat
- Children: 2

Digamber Kamat (born 8 March 1954) is an Indian politician who served as the ninth Chief Minister of Goa from 2007 to 2012 and now as cabinet minister in state cabinet. He won the seventh term as a MLA from Margao Assembly constituency in 2022. From 2006 to 2019, he was the president of Swimming Federation of India. Currently, he serves as an MLA from the Margao constituency.

== Early life ==
Digambar Kamat was born in Margão, Portuguese Goa. He holds a bachelor's degree in science (BSc).

== Political career ==
Kamat started his career as a member of the Indian National Congress. In 1994, he joined the Bharatiya Janata Party Coalition government. In 2005, he again joined the Indian National Congress to support the Margao constituency voters' referendum choice. Kamat passed the baton of leadership on 6 March 2012, to a BJP majority government in the Goa Assembly Elections held in March 2012. He retained his Margao Constituency seat and continued until 2019 as elected legislative member of Margao Constituency.

=== Chief Minister of Goa ===
He became Chief Minister of Goa in 2007.

=== Leader of Opposition, Goa ===
On 17 July 2019, Digambar Kamat was unanimously chosen a leader of opposition of Goa Legislative Assembly representing the Indian National Congress. In March 2022, he was once again elected as a legislative member of Margao Constituency.

On 31 March 2022, he was appointed a permanent invitee to the Congress Working Committee (CWC). In July 2022, he was removed as the 'Permanent Invitee' to CWC.

=== Defection to BJP ===
On 14 September 2022, Kamat along with senior Congress leader Michael Lobo, and 6 other Congress MLAs joined Bharatiya Janata Party, after meeting Dr. Pramod Sawant, BJP Chief Minister of Goa. The defection was a result of a successful Operation Kamala.

== Personal life ==
Kamat is married to Asha and has two children.

Preceded by Pratapsing Rane	Chief Minister of Goa; 2007–2012	Succeeded by Manohar Parrikar
