= Uday Bhembre =

Indian lawyer and writer (born 1939)

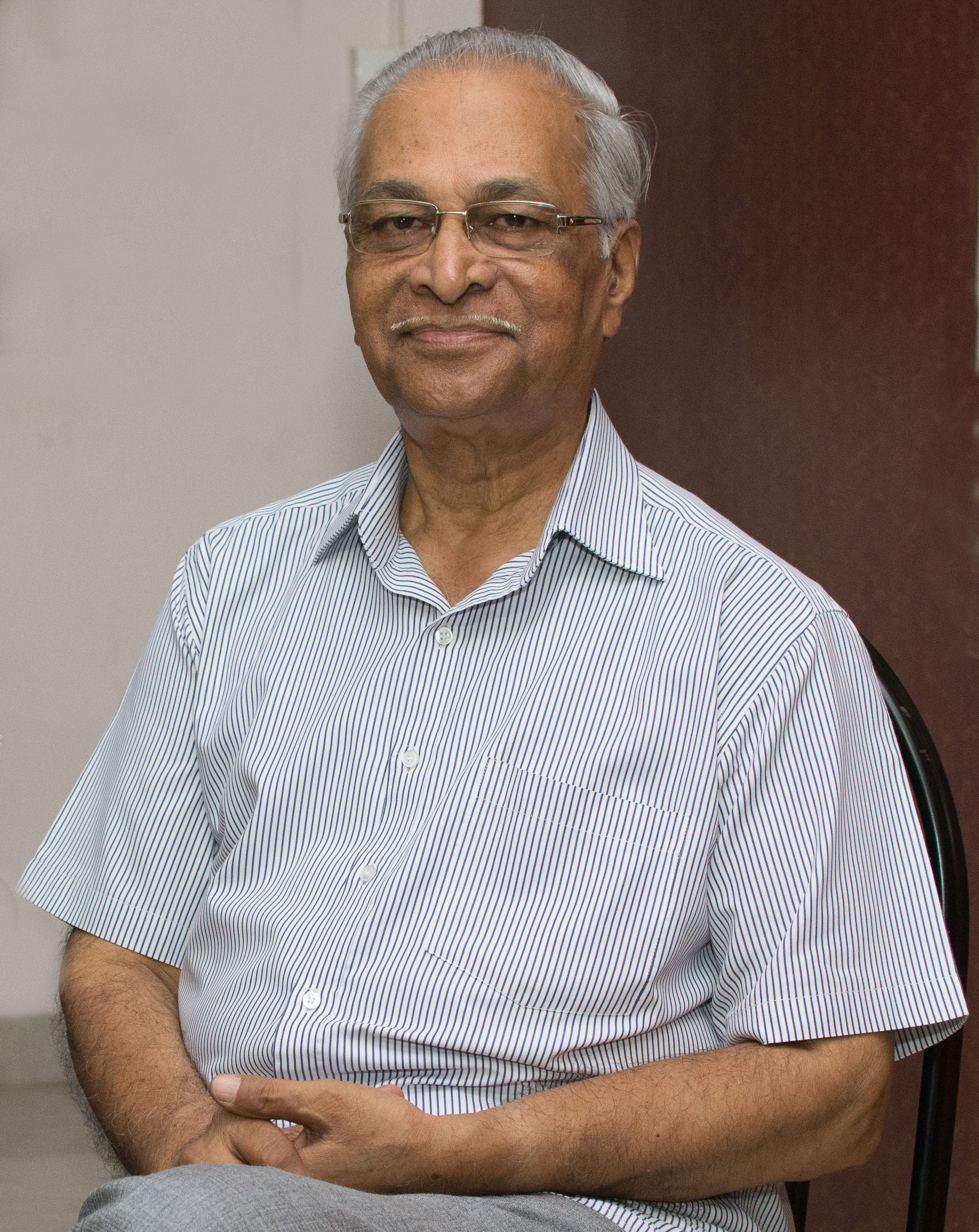
- Bhembre in 2015

Member of the Goa, Daman and Diu Legislative Assembly
- In office 1984–1989
- Preceded by: Babu Naik
- Succeeded by: Babu Naik
- Constituency: Margao

Personal details
- Born: Uday Laxmikant Bhembre; 27 December 1939 (age 86) Margão, Goa, Portuguese India
- Party: Independent
- Other political affiliations: Indian National Congress (1963–1967)
- Parent: Laxmikant Bhembre (father)
- Occupation: Lawyer; writer; politician
- Awards: Sahitya Akademi Award (2015)
- Writing career
- Language: Konkani
- Notable work: "Channeache Rati" (1967)
- Movement: Konkani language agitation

Uday Laxmikant Bhembre (born 27 December 1939) is an Indian lawyer, Konkani writer and former politician who served as member of the Goa, Daman and Diu Legislative Assembly, representing the Margao Assembly constituency from 1984 to 1989. He is noted for his role as the editor of the Konkani daily, Sunaparant, and as a Konkani language activist. Bhembre is also widely known as the lyricist of the famed Goan Konkani language song "Channeache Rati".

== Early life ==
Uday Laxmikant Bhembre was born on 27 December 1939 in Margão, Goa, Portuguese India during the Portuguese Empire (now in India). He is the son of independence activist Laxmikant Bhembre.

He completed his primary and secondary education across various locations in Goa, including Zambaulim, Rivona, Curchorem, and Vasco. Due to the lack of higher education facilities in Goa at the time, he pursued further studies in Bombay. He completed a Bachelor of Arts degree from Siddharth College and subsequently obtained an L.L.B. degree from the Government Law College.

== Career ==
=== Legal and early career ===
Bhembre began his professional career in Mumbai, working as a staff artist at the Mumbai center of Akashvani from 1961 to 1963, where he gained foundational experience as a poet and lyricist. As a lawyer by profession, he began his legal practice in Mumbai in 1971. He returned to Goa shortly thereafter, establishing his legal practice there in 1973, which he continued for decades.

=== Journalism and the Goa Opinion Poll ===
From 1963 to 1968, Bhembre worked as a co-editor for the Margao-based daily newspaper Rashtramat. Through his regular columns, "Brahmastra" and "Sudarshan," written in Marathi, he actively engaged in public discourse. During the 1967 Goa Opinion Poll, he used his writing and oratory skills to campaign against the political proposal to merge Goa into Maharashtra. He advocated for preserving Goa's distinct identity and educating the local community on Konkani identity and heritage.

In 1993, he took over as the editor-in-chief of the Konkani daily newspaper Sunaparant. His popular columns from Rashtramat were later compiled and published in a book titled Brahmastra.

=== Political career ===
In the 1984 elections to the Goa, Daman and Diu Legislative Assembly, Bhembre was pitched as an independent candidate by the united opposition in the Margao Assembly constituency, against Indian National Congress party's Babu Naik. He defeated Naik and became a member of the legislature. His legislative work was noted for being analytical and well-researched. The Goa, Daman and Diu Official Language Act, 1987, was enacted by the Legislative Assembly on 4 February 1987 and received presidential assent on 14 April 1987.

== Activism ==
Bhembre played an active role in several socio-cultural and language movements in Goa.

During the Goa Opinion Poll, Bhembre campaigned against Goa's merger with Maharashtra.

Bhembre was also a leader of the Konkani language agitation. He participated in the campaigns aimed at securing recognition for Konkani from the Sahitya Akademi, declaring it the official language of Goa, and obtaining its inclusion in the Eighth Schedule to the Constitution of India. The movement also led to the enactment of the Goa, Daman and Diu Official Language Act, 1987. This Act made Konkani as Goa's official language.

As of the 2010s, Bhembre was a leader of the Bharatiya Bhasha Suraksha Manch (Indian Languages' Protection Organisation - BBSM). This Manch has been set up in Goa to oppose the state government's decision to grant aid to primary schools imparting education in English. Bhembre and the BBSM demand that government grants be allotted to only those educational institutions which provide primary education in the students' mother tongue, i.e., Konkani and Marathi.

== Institutional roles ==
Bhembre held several leadership positions in literary and language institutions:

- Konkani Bhasha Mandal: Served as the President from 1973 to 1983. During his tenure, he collaborated with educators and colleagues to develop Konkani textbooks for schools and successfully secured government recognition for them.
- Goa Konkani Akademi: He was associated with the academy since its inception and became its President in 1996.
- Asmitai Pratishthan: Served as the President of this Margao-based institution since 1995, focusing on publishing research literature in Konkani.
- All India Konkani Parishad: Elected as the president of the 16th session held in Kochi, Kerala in 1986. He also served as the reception committee chairman for the 14th session held in Panaji in 1982.
- Other roles: Served as the President of the All India Konkani Writers' Conference in Margao (1975). He also worked as a member of the Konkani Language Advisory Committee of the Sahitya Akademi, the Standardization Committee for names of Goa, Daman, and Diu, the Official Language Advisory Committee of Goa state, and the Divisional Committee of the Southern Railway. Additionally, he served as the president of the Goa, Daman, and Diu Bar Association, secretary of the Pt. Jawaharlal Nehru Trust in Goa, and a member of the Kala Academy.

== Works ==
Apart from his journalistic writing, Bhembre is an accomplished poet, lyricist, and playwright. He authored a popular collection of poems and songs titled "Channeache Rati". The title song from this collection achieved widespread popularity and evolved into a local folk song.

He also wrote a play titled Karnaparva, which is based on a narrative from the Mahabharata. Around 20 of his songs have been recorded and broadcast by Akashvani and HMV.

== Awards and honours ==
Bhembre was awarded the Kullagar Puraskar (1999), Gundu Sitaram Amonkar Memorial Award (2001), Konkani Bhasha Mandal Patrakarita Puraskar (2008), Bhangrallem Goem Asmitai (2014) Puraskar among others. Bhembre has been honoured with the Sahitya Akademi Award in Konkani language for the year 2015. He was awarded the prestigious award for his play, Karna Parv.

He has also been appointed the Chair Professor of Poet Bakibab Borkar Chair of Goa University.
