= Delilah Lobo =

Indian politician and businesswoman (born 1977)

Delilah Michael Lobo
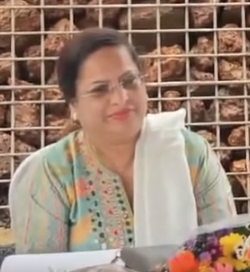
- Lobo in 2024

Member of Goa Legislative Assembly
- Incumbent
- Assumed office 10 March 2022
- Preceded by: Vinoda Paliencar
- Constituency: Siolim

Personal details
- Born: 23 April 1977 (age 49) Goa, India
- Party: Bharatiya Janata Party (2022–present)
- Other political affiliations: Indian National Congress (2022–2022)
- Spouse: Michael Lobo
- Children: 2
- Education: Dnyanprassarak Mandal's College (B.Com)
- Occupation: Politician; businesswoman
- Website: facebook.com/DelilahLoboofficial

Delilah Michael Lobo (born 23 April 1977) is an Indian politician and businesswoman who serves as a member of the Goa Legislative Assembly, representing the Siolim Assembly constituency. Lobo won the Siolim constituency on the Indian National Congress (INC) ticket in the 2022 Goa Legislative Assembly election. She defeated four-time MLA Dayanand Mandrekar of the Bharatiya Janata Party by a margin of 1,727 votes. On 14 September 2022, Lobo along with her husband and six other legislators of the Indian National Congress party quit to join the Bharatiya Janata Party (BJP).

== Early and personal life ==
Delilah Michael Lobo was born on 23 April 1977 in Goa, India, to Almira and Melchiades Vincent Lobo. She has been married to politician and businessman Michael Lobo. She completed her Higher Secondary School Certificate (HSSC) and graduation in Bachelor of Commerce (B.Com) from Dnyanprassarak Mandal's College in 1998.

== Political career ==
Lobo was a panch (panchayat member) for a period of five years prior to contesting the 2022 Goa Legislative Assembly elections. She is also a former ten-year sarpanch and former BJP Mahila Morcha state vice president, who resigned on 11 January 2022 to join the Indian National Congress party (INC) along with her husband, Michael Lobo.

On 14 September 2022, Lobo along with her husband and six other legislators of the Indian National Congress party quit to join the Bharatiya Janata Party (BJP).

== 2022 illegal land filling ==
On 5 May 2022, Mapusa police registered an FIR against Lobo and her husband for illegal land filling at Parra, Goa. The FIR was filed by complainant, North Goa planning and development authority (NGPDA), at the behest of Town & Country Planning (TCP) minister, Vishwajit Rane.
