= Ravi Naik =

Indian politician (1946–2025)

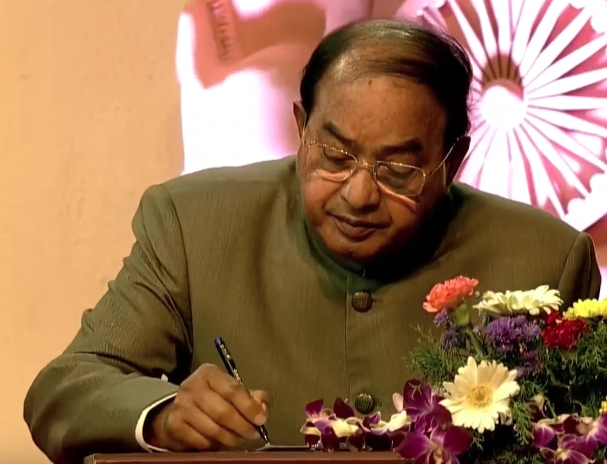
- Naik in 2022

4th Chief Minister of Goa
- In office 25 January 1991 – 18 May 1993
- Preceded by: President's rule
- Succeeded by: Wilfred de Souza
- In office 2 April 1994 – 8 April 1994
- Preceded by: Wilfred de Souza
- Succeeded by: Wilfred de Souza

Member of the Goa Legislative Assembly
- In office 2017 – 14 October 2025
- Preceded by: Lavoo Mamledar
- Constituency: Ponda
- In office 1999–2012
- Preceded by: Verekar Shivdas Atmaram
- Succeeded by: Lavoo Mamledar
- Constituency: Ponda
- In office 1989–1994
- Preceded by: Gaunkar Babusso Sanvlo
- Succeeded by: Shripad Naik
- Constituency: Marcaim
- In office 1984–1989
- Preceded by: Aguiar Jolido Souza
- Succeeded by: Verekar Shivdas Atmaram
- Constituency: Ponda

Member of Parliament, Lok Sabha
- In office 10 March 1998 – 26 April 1999
- Preceded by: Ramakant Khalap
- Succeeded by: Shripad Naik
- Constituency: North Goa

Cabinet Minister to the Government of Goa
- In office March 2022 – 14 October 2025

Personal details
- Born: 18 September 1946 Ponda, Goa, Portuguese India
- Died: 14 October 2025 (aged 79) Ponda, Goa, India
- Party: Bharatiya Janata Party (2000–2002; 2021–2025)
- Other political affiliations: Maharashtrawadi Gomantak Party (1976–1991); Indian National Congress (1991–2000; 2002–2021)

Ravi Sitaram Naik (18 September 1946 – 14 October 2025), also known as Patrao, was an Indian politician who served as the fourth Chief Minister of Goa, holding the office twice between 1991 and 1994. He was a member of the Bharatiya Janata Party (BJP). Naik started his political career as a member of the Maharashtrawadi Gomantak Party (MGP).

== Personal life ==
Ravi Sitaram Naik was born in Ponda, Portuguese Goa, on 18 September 1946. His father was Sitaram Naik.

His biodata listed him as an "agriculturist, political and social worker", and his home was in the central Goa sub-district of Ponda. His "favourite pastime and recreation" activities were listed as gardening, music, reading and watching television, while his "special interest" was listed as social service.

Naik was the only legislator in Goa who was a national volleyball player. He was chief minister for just a 6 day stint in 1994 (when he was controversially appointed by the then Governor). He played badminton, and according to the Times of India he "began his career by owning a bar and restaurant in Ponda".

== Political career ==
=== Stint as Chief Minister ===
Took office	Left office	Party	Days in office
25 January 1991	18 May 1993	Indian National Congress, after breaking away from Maharashtrawadi Gomantak Party	844 days
2 April 1994	8 April 1994	Indian National Congress, in power for few days following decision of Governor Bhanu Prakash Singh, subsequently the latter was removed from office by New Delhi.	6 days [total 850 days]

Naik contested his first elections in 1980 on a Maharashtrawadi Gomantak Party ticket, but lost. After quitting that party in 1991, he became the state's chief minister then and again in 1994.

He had been a member of the Goa Legislative Assembly since 1984, but not continuously. In 1990, he was part of the team which topped the then ruling Congress party, leading to intercine political instability that dominated much of that decade and more. Naik later quit the party in 2000.

Besides chairing committees in the Goa Assembly, he was also a cabinet minister at the regional (Goa) level holding—at different times—the portfolios of Agriculture, Animal Husbandry and Veterinary Services, Information & Publicity, Home, Town & Country Planning, Personnel, General Administration, Vigilance, Finance, PWD, Housing, Science and Technology and Printing & Stationery.

Naik lost the 2012 elections to Lavoo Mamledar of the Maharashtrawadi Gomantak Party.

According to the official website of the Goa Assembly, he won the 2007 elections on an Indian National Congress ticket from the Ponda constituency, where a total of 24557 votes were polled. Naik received 9972 votes, and won by a margin of 1656 votes. He also won the 2002 Assembly elections (Ponda, 1320 votes margin), and the 1989 elections (Madkai, 1651 votes margin).

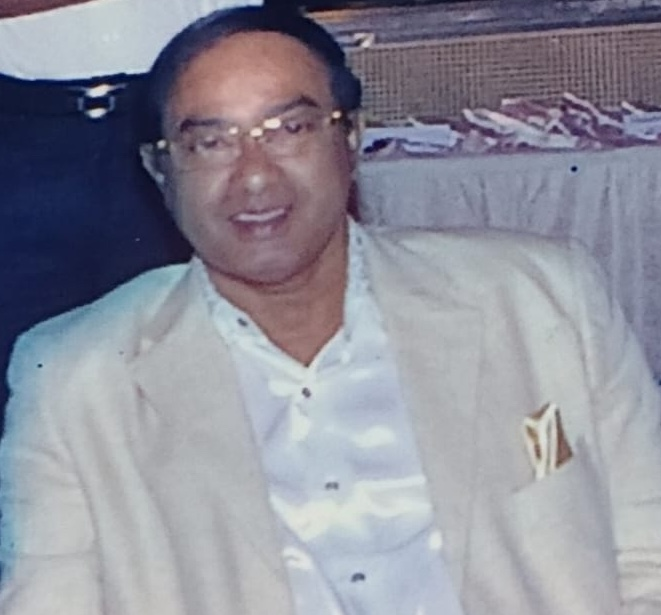
Ravi Naik in the early 2010s

Ravi Naik was elected again to the Goa Assembly in the state election of 2017, this time with a margin of 3000 votes. He was a member of five member Congress Legislative Party (CLP) of Goa and remained with the party during the two-thirds split in the CLP in 2019 where 10 MLAs defected to the ruling BJP.

Naik was re-elected in 2022 state election as a BJP candidate.

=== National Parliament, Goa opposition, Deputy Chief Minister ===
In 1998, after a loss in local politics, he was elected to the national Indian parliament. In 1999, he took over as Leader of the Goa Opposition, and between 2000 and 2002 he was Deputy Chief Minister in the then Bharatiya Janata Party government in Goa. "I have not been in elections from yesterday or today. I've been in politics since 1967... and we were against the merger (of Goa into Maharashtra)," Naik said (in Konkani) in the Prudent TV.

His son Roy Naik has also been involved in local politics.

== Reception ==
In an interview with Prudent TV, he defended his handling of the police in Goa, which had come in for sharp criticism during his tenure at their helm as Home Minister.

His ascent to power for his first tenure in 1990-91 was questioned in a Supreme Court of India case over his assumption to power with Indian National Congress support, apparently because of the disqualification he was facing.

The then opposition BJP made allegations against Naik and his son Roy Naik of involvement with the coastal illegal narcotic trade. Opposition politicians and a section of the media highlighted charges by Swedish model Lucky Farmhouse which suggested that Naik or his kin were in some way connected with the narcotics controversy.

== Death ==
Naik died from a heart attack in Ponda, on 14 October 2025, at the age of 79.
