= John D'Souza =

Indian politician

- Official portrait, 1963

Member of Goa, Daman and Diu Legislative Assembly
- In office 11 December 1963 – 1967
- Preceded by: constituency established
- Succeeded by: Valente Sequeira
- Constituency: Calangute
- Majority: 5,335 (51.24%)

Personal details
- Born: John Marian D'Souza Goa, Portuguese India, Portuguese Empire (now in India)
- Died: Unknown
- Party: United Goans Party (1963–1967)

John Marian D'Souza was an Indian politician. He was a former member of the Goa, Daman and Diu Legislative Assembly, representing the Calangute Assembly constituency from 1963 to 1967. He was a member of the United Goans Party.

== Career ==
D'Souza contested in the 1963 Goa, Daman and Diu Legislative Assembly election from the Calangute Assembly constituency on the United Goans Party and won by defeating the Maharashtrawadi Gomantak Party candidate by a majority of 1,702 votes. He was then succeeded by Valente Sequeira as the member of the constituency.
