= Wilfred de Souza =

Indian politician (1927–2015)

Wilfred de Souza GCIH FRCS FRCSE
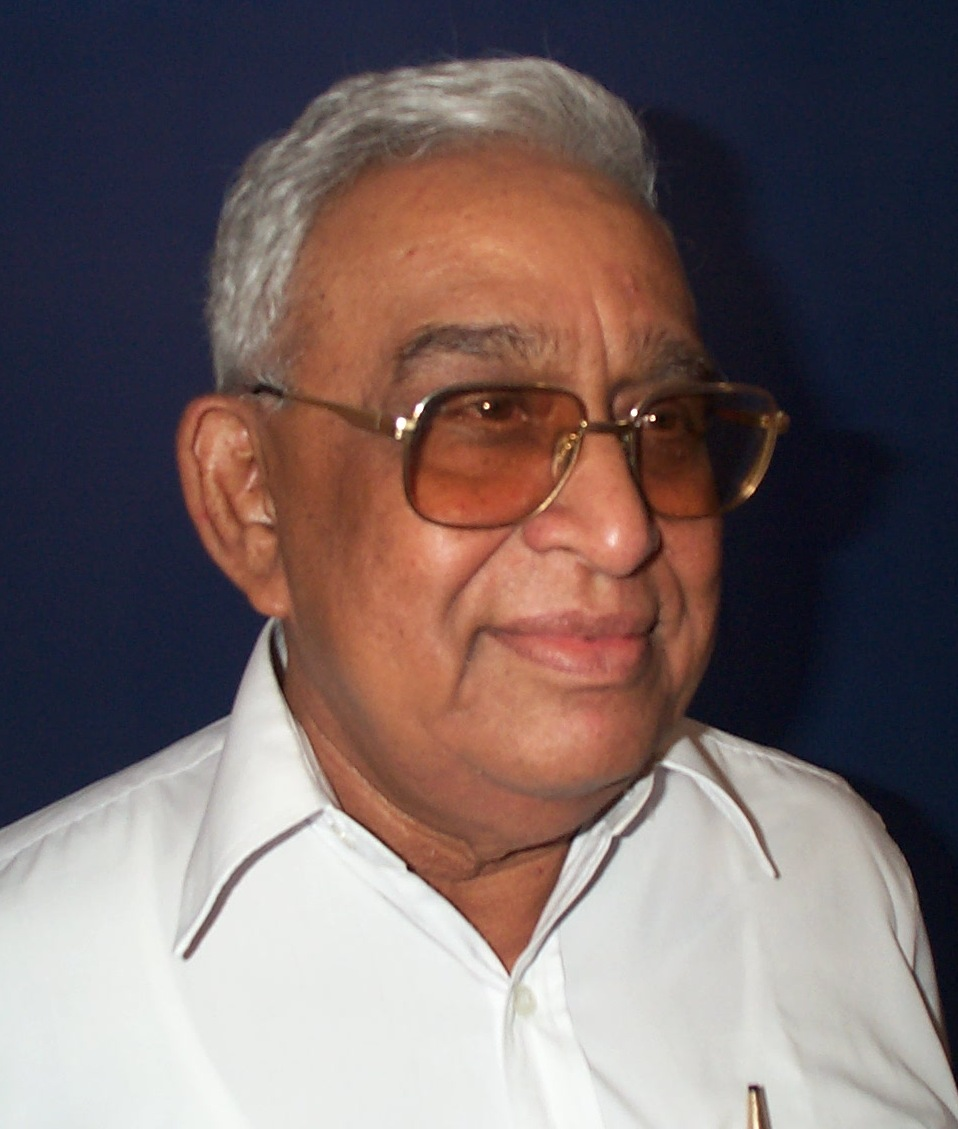
- De Souza in 2001

5th Chief Minister of Goa
- In office 18 May 1993 – 2 April 1994
- Preceded by: Ravi Naik
- Succeeded by: Ravi Naik
- In office 8 April 1994 – 16 December 1994
- Preceded by: Ravi Naik
- Succeeded by: Pratapsingh Rane
- In office 30 July 1998 – 26 November 1998
- Preceded by: Pratapsingh Rane
- Succeeded by: Luizinho Faleiro

1st Deputy Chief Minister of Goa
- In office 16 January 1980 – 18 September 1983
- Preceded by: Office established
- Succeeded by: Ramakant Khalap
- In office 25 January 1991 – 29 July 1998
- Preceded by: Ramakant Khalap
- Succeeded by: Dayanand Narvekar
- In office June 2005 -7 June 2007
- Preceded by: Filipe Nery Rodrigues
- Succeeded by: Francis D'Souza

Member of the Goa Legislative Assembly
- In office 1989–2007
- Preceded by: constituency established
- Succeeded by: Dilip Parulekar
- Constituency: Saligao
- In office 1980–1984
- Preceded by: Ilario Rual Fernandes
- Succeeded by: Malik Shrikant Keshav
- Constituency: Calangute
- In office 1974–1977
- Preceded by: Vasudeo Narayan Sarmalkar
- Succeeded by: Cota Lourence
- Constituency: Benaulim

Personal details
- Born: Wilfred Anthony de Souza; 23 April 1927 Vagator, Goa, Portuguese India
- Died: 4 September 2015 (aged 88) Dona Paula, Goa, India
- Party: Trinamool Congress (2012–2015)
- Other political affiliations: Independent (1972–1976); Indian National Congress (1976–1978; 1988–1997); Indian National Congress (U) (1978–1983); Goa Congress (1983–1988); Goa Rajiv Congress Party (1997–1999); Nationalist Congress Party (1999–2012)
- Spouse: Grace de Souza (m. 1962)
- Relations: Romuald D'Souza (brother)
- Children: 2
- Occupation: Politician; surgeon

Wilfred Anthony "Willy" de Souza GCIH FRCS FRCSE (23 April 1927 – 4 September 2015) was an Indian surgeon and politician who served as the fifth Chief Minister of Goa, holding the office thrice between 1993 and 1998. He also served as first Deputy Chief Minister of Goa in different occasions from 1980 to 2007, and held the position a total of four times. He was a member of the Indian National Congress and the Goa Rajiv Congress Party, during his third tenure.

== Early life and education ==
Wilfred Anthony de Souza was born in Vagator, Portuguese Goa on 23 April 1927, to Dr. Tito Fermino de Souza and Alina Ana Maria de Souza, of Goan Catholic origin from Anjuna, Goa. Jesuit priest Romuald D'Souza was his brother.

De Souza completed his MB BS from Bombay University. He was a Fellow of the Royal College of Surgeons, England and Fellow of the Royal College of Surgeons, Edinburgh. As well as an Honorary Fellow of the International College of Surgeons and also Fellow of the Association of Surgeons of India.

== Political career ==
De Souza is credited, together with allies such as Govind Panvelcar, with the first Congress Party victory in Goa in 1980. From 1963 until 1979, Goan politics had been dominated by the regional parties, particularly the Maharashtrawadi Gomantak Party (MGP).

In July 1998, De Souza formed the Goa Rajiv Congress Party as a splinter group of the Indian National Congress (INC). He was sworn in as Chief Minister of Goa for the third time on 30 July 1998 and remained in the post until 26 November 1998.

In 1999, De Souza joined the Nationalist Congress Party (NCP) and was its Goa president from 1999 to June 2009. During this period he was Deputy Chief Minister of Goa in a coalition government with the INC from February 2005 to June 2007. He failed to retain his seat in the 2007 assembly election.

After he left the party, Gurunath Kulkarni, national general secretary of the Nationalist Congress Party accused him of impeding the party's growth in Goa.

In 2007, he was appointed the Deputy Chairperson of the State Planning Board.

For the 2012 assembly election he was a member of the All India Trinamool Congress as head of the Goa branch of the party. During the election, he criticised the INC for corruption.

== Personal life ==
In April 1962, de Souza married British social worker Grace de Souza (née Goodwin), whom he had met during his time in England, UK. The couple had two daughters Joanne and Suzie.

== Death ==
De Souza died on 4 September 2015 at Dona Paula, Goa, after a brief illness and prior to that, he was admitted in Manipal Hospital.

== Awards and achievements ==
1. Commander, Grand Cross of the Order of Dom Infante Henriques – from the Government of Portugal at the hands of the President of Portugal, H.E.Mario Soares;
2. Dr. B. C. Roy Award – as "Eminent Medical Man & Statesman" from the Medical Council of India at the hands of the President of India, H.E. Shri K.R. Narayanan;
3. The Silver Elephant Award – for services to Scouts & Guides by the President of India;
4. Sons of India – award from the society for Advanced Studies in Medical Sciences at the hands of Swami Brijendramandji, Head Ramkrishna Mission;
5. Jawaharlal Nehru Excellence Award – given by Institute of Economic Studies, New Delhi;
6. Indira Gandhi Solidarity Award – given by Indian Solidarity Council, New Delhi; Rajiv Gandhi Excellence Award, 1992;
7. International Gold Star Award – by Industrial Economic Forum, New Delhi; Super Achievers of India Award by Front for National Progress;
8. Glory of India International Award – by International Friendship Association of India;
9. Gold Award – by Shiromani Institute;

In addition, he has worked in several hospitals in the UK 1957–1963; Consultant surgeon to Goa Medical College Panjim; Asilo Hospital Mapuca; Hospicio Hospital Margao; Holy Cross Hospital, Mapuca; C.M.M. Memorial Hospital, Panjim. .
