= Chandrakant Keni =

Indian Konkani writer (1934–2009)

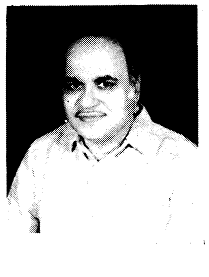
- Portrait of Keni
- Born: 1934; Cuncolim, Goa, Portuguese India
- Died: 3 February 2009 (aged 74–75); Margao, Goa, India
- Occupations: Writer; journalist
- Children: 2
- Writing career
- Language: Konkani
- Notable awards: Sahitya Academy Award

Chandrakant Shantaram Keni (1934 – 3 February 2009) was an Indian author and journalist. He is known for his work in Konkani literature and his contributions to journalism in Goa. He was the editor of Marathi daily Rashtramath and Konkani Daily Sunaparant. Keni won Sahitya Academy Award for his Konkani book Ashad Pawali.

== Early life ==
Keni was born in 1934 in the village of Cuncolim, Portuguese Goa.

== Career ==
=== Journalism ===
Keni served as the editor for several publications. He was the editor of Kulagar, a Konkani monthly magazine, and Rashtramat, a Marathi daily newspaper. He also edited Triveni, a monthly magazine published in Konkani, Marathi, and Hindi.In 1987, he became the editor of Sunaparantha, which was the first Konkani newspaper to be published in the Devanagari script.

=== Literary work ===
Keni began his writing career in the 1950s, focusing initially on short stories. His writing style is often described as experimental. Unlike many other Konkani writers whose works focus on local or regional themes, scholars have noted that Keni's stories often feature a universal setting.

In addition to Konkani, he wrote in Marathi and Hindi. He was also fluent in Gujarati, English, and Portuguese. Keni has translated stories from various Indian languages into Konkani.

His first collection of short stories, The Earth Was Still Alive, was published in 1964. Other notable short story collections include Ashadh Pavali (1973), Eklo Exuro (1973), Tareterechi Samvagan (1973), and Alami (1975). He also wrote a children's story titled Phulancho Haat (1972).

== Awards and positions ==
Keni served as the President of the 11th All India Konkani Sahitya Parishad held in Mangalore. He also held the position of President at the Gomantak Rashtrabhasha University.

In 1988, he received the Sahitya Akademi Award for his short story collection Vankal Pavani.

== Works ==
- The Earth Was Still Alive (1964)
- Phulancho Haat (1972)
- Ashadh Pavali (1973)
- Eklo Exuro (1973)
- Tareterechi Samvagan (1973)
- Alami (1975)
- Vankal Pavani
- Ushnim Vailan
