= Francis D'Souza (politician) =

Indian politician and lawyer (1954–2019)

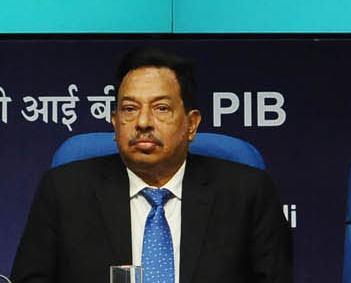
- D'Souza at IFFI 2016

6th Deputy Chief Minister of Goa
- In office 9 March 2012 – 14 March 2017
- Preceded by: Wilfred de Souza
- Succeeded by: Sudin Dhavalikar; Vijai Sardesai

Member of Goa Legislative Assembly
- In office 1999–2019
- Preceded by: Surendra Sirsat
- Succeeded by: Joshua D'Souza
- Constituency: Mapusa

Personal details
- Born: Francisco Casimiro Jerónimo Agnelo Pinto de Souza; 4 October 1954 Mapuçá, Goa, Portuguese India
- Died: 14 February 2019 (aged 64) Panaji, Goa, India
- Resting place: St Jerome's Church cemetery, Mapusa, Goa, India
- Party: Bharatiya Janata Party (2002–2019)
- Other political affiliations: Goa Rajiv Congress Party (1999–2002)
- Children: Joshua De Souza (son)
- Occupation: Lawyer; politician

Francisco Casimiro Jerónimo Agnelo Pinto de Souza (4 October 1954 – 14 February 2019), better known as Francis D'Souza, was an Indian lawyer, politician, and a member of the Bharatiya Janata Party who served as the sixth Deputy Chief Minister of Goa from 2012 to 2017. He had first unsuccessfully contested in the 1989 Goa Legislative Assembly election from the Mapusa Assembly constituency as an independent candidate.

== Political career ==
D'Souza was first elected to the Goa Legislative Assembly in 1999 as the Goa Rajiv Congress Party's candidate and later in 2002, 2007, 2012 and 2017 as the BJP candidate from the Mapusa constituency. He was appointed Deputy Chief Minister when BJP formed a government in 2012 under Manohar Parrikar's leadership and remained Deputy Chief Minister when Laxmikant Parsekar became the Chief Minister. He was also front-runner to succeed Manohar Parrikar as the chief minister.

== Controversy ==
In July 2014, he landed into a controversy after publicly declaring that India is a Hindu nation and he was a Christian-Hindu.

== Death ==
D'Souza died on 14 February 2019 at the age of 64 following a battle with cancer.

== Positions held ==
- 1985 – Elected as the Councillor of Mapusa Municipal Council.
- 1986–1988 – President of Mapusa Municipal Council.
- 1995 – Elected as the Councillor of Mapusa Municipal Council.
- 1998–2000 Chairman of Mapusa Municipal Council.
- 1999 – Cabinet Minister of Law, Election and Urban Development
- 2000–2002 – Cabinet Minister of Judiciary and Labour & Employment
- 2002–2005 – Cabinet Minister of Information Technology, Law & Judiciary, Legislative Affairs and Craftsmen Training.
- 2012–2014 – Cabinet Minister of Urban Development, Revenue and Craftsmen Training
- 2014–2019 – Deputy Chief Minister, Cabinet Minister of Health, Revenue, Town and Country Planning, Urban Development and Law, Legislative Affairs
- 2017–2019 – Cabinet Minister of Urban Development, Law and Judiciary, Legislative Affairs and Provedoria.
