= Surendra Sirsat =

Indian politician (died 2021)

Speaker of Goa Legislative Assembly
- In office 1990–1991
- Preceded by: Luis Proto Barbosa
- Succeeded by: Sheikh Hassan Haroon

Member of the Goa Legislative Assembly
- In office 1989–1999
- Preceded by: Chandreshekar Diucar
- Succeeded by: Francis D'Souza
- Constituency: Mapusa

Member of the Goa Legislative Assembly
- In office 1977–1980
- Preceded by: Raghuvir Pancar
- Succeeded by: Shyamsunder Nevagi
- Constituency: Mapusa

Personal details
- Born: 1945/1946 Goa, Portuguese India
- Died: 29 March 2021 (aged 75–76)

Surendra Sirsat (1945/1946 – 29 March 2021) was an Indian politician and member of the Nationalist Congress Party. Sirsat was a member of the Goa Legislative Assembly in 1977, 1984, 1989 and 1994 from the Mapusa constituency in North Goa as Maharashtrawadi Gomantak Party candidate.
