= Dayanand Mandrekar =

Indian politician

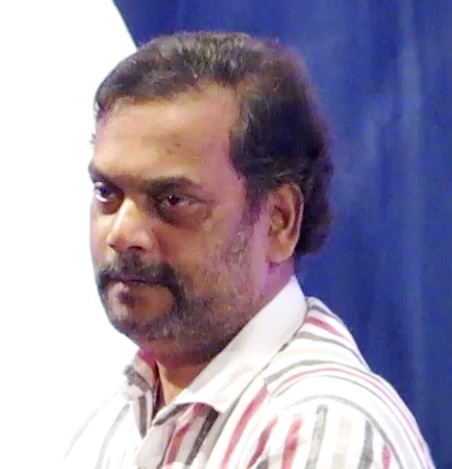
- Mandrekar in 2016

Minister of Civil Supplies and Price Control Water Resources Archives & Archaeology Art & Culture in the Goa Government
- In office 2012 – 11 March 2017

Member of the Goa Legislative Assembly
- In office 2012 – 11 March 2017
- Succeeded by: Vinoda Paliencar
- Constituency: Siolim

Member of the Goa Legislative Assembly
- In office 2007–2012
- Constituency: Siolim

Member of the Goa Legislative Assembly
- In office 2002 – 2005 (disqualfiied)
- Constituency: Siolim

Member of the Goa Legislative Assembly
- In office 1999–2002
- Constituency: Siolim

Personal details
- Party: Bharatiya Janata Party
- Occupation: Politician

Dayanand Rayu Mandrekar is an Indian politician who served as a four-term member of the Goa Legislative Assembly, representing the Siolim constituency.

== Political career ==
Mandrekar was first elected to the Goa Legislative Assembly in the 1999 Goa Legislative Assembly election from the Siolim constituency as a candidate of the Bharatiya Janata Party. He retained the Siolim in the 2002, 2007 and 2012 Assembly elections. He was disqualified in 2005 by the Bombay High Court for holding an office of profit and the conviction upheld by the Supreme Court of India, as a result of which Mandrekar lost his office.

The Bharatiya Janata Party led by Manohar Parrikar formed the government in Goa in 2002 after the Goa Legislative Assembly. Mandrekar served as the Cabinet Minister in the government led by Parrikar from 3 June 2002 to 2 February 2005 and was allotted the portfolios of Agriculture, Animal Husbandry & Veterinary Services and Non-Conventional Source of Energy. When the Bharatiya Janata Party regained power post the 2012 election, Mandrekar was inducted as a Cabinet Minister. He was allotted the portfolios of Water Resources, Civil Supplies & Price Control and At & Culture

After Manohar Parrikar was appointed the Union Minister of Defence, Laxmikant Parsekar succeeded Parrikar as the Chief Minister of Goa. Mandrekar served as a Cabinet Minister in the government Laxmikant Parsekar and held the portfolios of Panchayats, Civil Supplies and Price Control, Water Resources, Archives & Archaeology and Art & Culture. In a cabinet reshuffle held in October 2015, Mandrekar was stripped of the Panchayats portfolio and the same was allotted to Rajendra Arlekar. Mandrekar expressed his displeasure stating that he was not consulted before discharging him of the Panchayat portfolio. He stated that while he was not upset about the portfolio being taken away, he was unhappy because he was not consulted by the Chief Minister Laxmikant Parsekar prior to the same.

In December 2016, Mandrekar was allotted the portfolio of Archives and Archeology.

Mandrekar also served as the Chairman of the Khadi and Village Industries Board. He was the Chairman of the Goa Meat Complex Ltd. and a member of the North Goa Zilla Panchayat.

He lost the 2017 Goa Legislative Assembly election to Goa Forward Party's Vinoda Paliencar.

He was defeated again in 2022 Goa Legislative Assembly election.

== Controversy ==
As the Art & Culture Minister, Mandrekar compared Nigerians to ‘cancer’ in Goa. He later apologized for his statement.
