= Sunaparant =

Defunct Indian Konkani-language daily newspaper

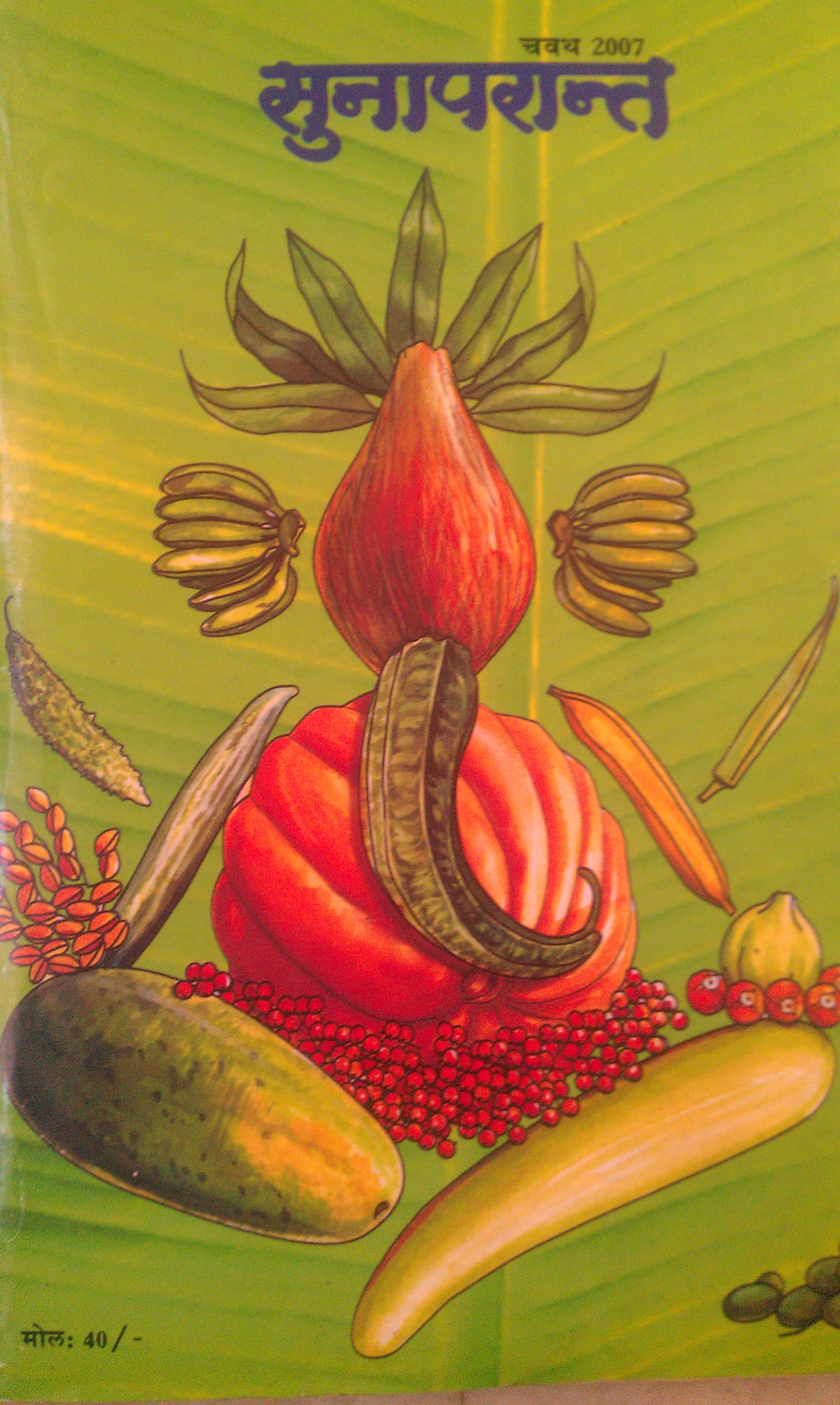
- Front page of Sunaparant Ganesh Chaturthi 2007 magazine
- Type: Daily newspaper
- Owner: Salgaocar
- Founder: Chandrakant Keni
- Founded: 13 May 1987; 39 years ago
- Ceased publication: 1 April 2015
- Language: Konkani
- Headquarters: Panaji, Goa, India
- Website: http://goacom.com/sunaparant-news/

Sunaparant (Sunāparānt) was a Konkani newspaper in Devanagari script. Based in Goa, India, it operated from 1987 to 2015. It published a special magazine during the Ganesh Chaturthi annual festival. Sunaparant was started on 13 May 1987, after Konkani was made the official language on 4 February that year, after a prolonged struggle by Goans.

== History ==
Chandrakant Keni, who was also editing Rashtramat, was the founder editor of the four-page Konkani newspaper started from Margao, the fort of Konkani movement. He was succeeded by Uday Bhembre and Raju Nayak, after which the black-and-white newspaper was shifted to the capital city of Panaji, with 10 pages and coloured edition in 2004. In Panaji, Sandesh Prabhudesai, Anant Salkar and Babali Naik were its editors.

Nearly 28 years after its first edition, Sunaparant shut down on 1 August 2015, with the management attributing the decision to the escalating cost of bringing out the newspaper.
