= Vasant Velingkar =

Indian politician and activist

- Official portrait, 1963

Member of Goa Legislative Assembly
- In office 11 December 1963 – 30 March 1964
- Preceded by: constituency established
- Succeeded by: Dayanand Bandodkar
- Constituency: Marcaim
- Majority: 6,924 (83.26%) (Note: the majority votes polled may or may not be of Dayanand Bandodkar.)

Personal details
- Born: Vasant C. Velingkar Goa, Portuguese India
- Died: Unknown (Note: died prior to 1990.)
- Party: Janata Party (Note: joined in c. 1977 to probably until death.)
- Other political affiliations: Maharashtrawadi Gomantak Party (1963–1977)
- Occupation: Politician; activist

Vasant C. Velingkar (Note: also probably known as Vassant Madhu Velingkar according to .) was an Indian politician and activist who was a former member of the Goa Legislative Assembly, representing the Marcaim Assembly constituency from 1963 to March 1964. He was a member of the Maharashtrawadi Gomantak Party.

== Career ==
Velingkar contested in the 1963 Goa, Daman and Diu Legislative Assembly election from the Marcaim Assembly constituency on the Maharashtrawadi Gomantak Party (MGP) ticket and emerged victorious by defeating Indian National Congress candidate by 5,800 votes. He served for about three months and later resigned his office on 31 March 1964 for Dayanand Bandodkar. Following this a by-election was held within the constituency which resulted in Bandodkar taking charge of the Marcaim constituency, enabling him to later run for the chief ministerial seat in Goa.

Velingkar then unsuccessfully contested in the 1977 Goa, Daman and Diu Legislative Assembly election from the same constituency on the Janata Party ticket, he lost to MGP candidate Krishna Bandodkar by a margin of 4,606 votes. He along with his associates were also active in the Goan independence movement.
