= Vasudeo Narayan Sarmalkar =

Indian politician (died 1973)

- Official portrait in 1963

Member of Goa Legislative Assembly
- In office 1963–1967
- Preceded by: constituency established
- Succeeded by: Babu Naik
- Constituency: Margao
- In office 1972–1973
- Preceded by: Miranda Elu Jose
- Succeeded by: Wilfred de Souza
- Constituency: Benaulim
- Majority: 6,604 (76.87%)

Personal details
- Born: Bardes, Goa, Portuguese India
- Died: 29 November 1973
- Party: United Goans (Sequiera Group) (1963–1973)
- Children: 1
- Occupation: Politician

Vasudeo Narayan "Anna" Sarmalkar (unknown – 29 November 1973) was an Indian politician who was a former member of the Goa Legislative Assembly representing the Margao Assembly constituency from 1963 to 1972 and Benaulim Assembly constituency from 1972 to 1973. He was a member of the United Goans Party.

== Early and personal life ==
Vasudeo Narayan Sarmalkar hailed from Bardez, Goa. He had a son, Jyoti.
