= Gajanan Raikar =

Indian politician, poet and freedom fighter (1935–2021)

- Portrait of Raikar

Member of Goa Legislative Assembly
- In office 1963–1967
- Preceded by: constituency established
- Succeeded by: Shashikala Kakodkar
- Constituency: Ponda

Personal details
- Born: Gajanan Gopinath Raikar; 27 May 1935 Ponda, Goa, Portuguese India, Portuguese Empire (now in India)
- Died: 24 September 2021 (aged 86) Goa, India
- Party: Maharashtrawadi Gomantak Party
- Occupation: Politician; poet; freedom fighter; writer; journalist
- Profession: Educator
- Awards: Tamrapatra

Gajanan Gopinath Raikar (27 May 1935 – 24 September 2021) was an Indian politician, poet, writer, educator, journalist and freedom fighter from Goa. He was a former member of the Goa Legislative Assembly, representing the Ponda Assembly constituency from 1963 to 1967.

== Early life and education ==
Raikar was born on 27 May 1935 in Kavale, Portuguese Goa. He completed a Master of Arts (M.A.) degree and also earned a qualification in Hindi Sahitya Ratna. Professionally, he worked as a school teacher.

== Goan independence movement ==
Raikar actively engaged in the Goan independence movement. He played a key role in founding local units of the National Congress Goa organisation across the Tiswadi and Ponda talukas.

In 1954, he was arrested by police forces and detained at Altinho. He escaped from custody in 1955. In his absence, the Territorial Military Tribunal sentenced him to ten years of imprisonment and declared a reward of ten thousand for his capture.

== Post-independence career and later life ==
Following his time in the Goan independence movement, Raikar became an educationist. He also took an active part in social movements representing tenant farmers and youth.

After the Indian annexation of Goa, Raikar contested and was elected to the first Goa Legislative Assembly as a representative of the Ponda constituency.

He was also a well-known poet.

== Awards ==
The Government of India awarded Raikar the Tamra Patra (copper plaque) for his role in the independence struggle.
