= Goa Rajiv Congress Party =

Political party in India

- Leader: Wilfred de Souza
- Founder: Wilfred de Souza
- Founded: 1998
- Dissolved: 1999
- Split from: Indian National Congress
- Merged into: Nationalist Congress Party
- ECI status: dissolved party
- Alliance: National Democratic Alliance

Election symbol
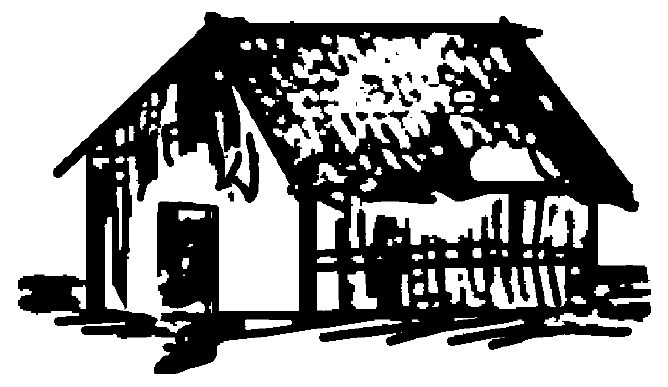

Goa Rajiv Congress Party (GRCP), was a splinter group of Indian National Congress in Goa. It was founded in 1998 by Wilfred de Souza. It formed a coalition state government with Bharatiya Janata Party (BJP) and Maharashtrawadi Gomantak Party, with de Souza as Chief Minister. In the split from INC de Souza took with him several local branches of the Congress party and the entire Youth Congress and National Students Union of India (Congress student wing) branches in the state.

Ahead of the Goa assembly elections 1999 GRCP launched 14 candidates, out of whom two were elected (Wilfred de Souza and Francis D'Souza). In total the party received 36 570 votes. Shortly after the elections GRCP merged with Nationalist Congress Party.

Francis de Souza left NCP to rejoin the INC 5 November same year. He later joined BJP.

== See also ==
- Indian National Congress breakaway parties
- Wilfred de Souza
