= Lavoo Mamledar =

Indian politician (1956–2025)

Member of the Goa Legislative Assembly
- In office 2012–2017
- Preceded by: Ravi Naik
- Succeeded by: Ravi Naik
- Constituency: Ponda

Personal details
- Born: 20 September 1956 Vasco da Gama, Portuguese Goa
- Died: 15 February 2025 (aged 68) Belgaum, Karnataka, India
- Party: Indian National Congress (2022–2025)
- Other political affiliations: Maharashtrawadi Gomantak Party (2012–2017); Trinamool Congress (2021)

Lavoo Mamledar (20 September 1956 – 15 February 2025) was an Indian politician who was a member of the Goa Legislative Assembly, representing the Ponda constituency from 2012 to 2017. He was elected in the 2012 Goa Legislative Assembly election on a ticket from Maharashtrawadi Gomantak Party. He lost the 2017 Goa Legislative Assembly election to Ravi Naik of Congress party. Mamledar was a member of the All India Trinamool Congress for three months until December 2021. In January 2022, he joined the Indian National Congress (INC).

Mamledar died after being assaulted in Belagavi, on 15 February 2025, at the age of 68. The police had arrested the suspect and charged with Mamledar's murder.
