= Dayanand Bandodkar =

Indian politician (1911–1973)

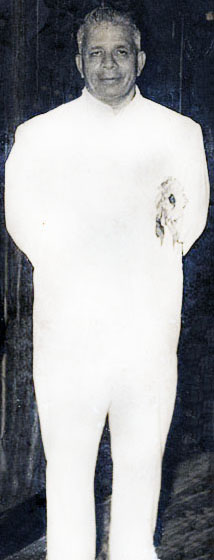
- Bandodkar in 1963

1st Chief Minister of Goa, Daman and Diu
- In office 20 December 1963 – 2 December 1966
- Preceded by: Office established
- Succeeded by: President's rule
- In office 5 April 1967 – 23 March 1972
- Preceded by: President's rule
- Succeeded by: Himself
- In office 23 March 1972 – 12 August 1973
- Preceded by: Himself
- Succeeded by: Shashikala Kakodkar

Member of Goa, Daman and Diu Legislative Assembly
- In office 31 December 1964 – 1972
- Preceded by: Vasant Velingkar
- Succeeded by: Krishna Bandodkar
- Constituency: Marcaim
- In office 1972 – 12 August 1973
- Preceded by: Anthony D'Souza
- Succeeded by: Ramakant Khalap
- Constituency: Mandrem

Personal details
- Born: Dayanand Balkrishna Bandodkar; 12 March 1911 Pernem, Goa, Portuguese India
- Died: 12 August 1973 (aged 62) Goa Medical College, Bambolim, Goa, India
- Party: Maharashtrawadi Gomantak Party (1963–1973)
- Children: 5, including Shashikala Kakodkar
- Relatives: Leena Chandavarkar (daughter-in-law)
- Occupation: Politician
- Nickname: Bhausaheb Bandodkar

Dayanand Balkrishna "Bhausaheb" Bandodkar (12 March 1911 – 12 August 1973) was an Indian politician who served as the first Chief Minister of Goa, Daman and Diu, holding the office from 1963 to 1973, with a gap of President's rule in late 1966. Born in Pernem to a Marathi family who had immigrated from Tuljapur in British India, he became a wealthy mine owner following the annexation of Goa. He unsuccessfully sought to merge the union territory of Goa with the state of Maharashtra. Bandodkar won the polls in 1963, 1967 and in 1972 while representing the Maharashtrawadi Gomantak Party and remained in power until his death in 1973.

== Early life ==
Dayanand Balkrishna Bandodkar was born on 12 March 1911 in Pernem, Portuguese Goa, to Balkrishna and Shrimati. He completed his primary education in Marathi at Mapusa and later pursued his school-level education in Portuguese at Nova Goa, but he did not complete it. He looked after his family's business interests, and eventually established himself as a mine owner following the Indian annexation of Goa. Bandodkar was a member of the Gomantak Maratha Samaj.

== Political career ==
=== Entry into politics and first term (1942–1966) ===
Bandodkar participated in the Quit India Movement in 1942. In his youth, he was influenced by the ideology of Raja Ram Mohan Roy, which inspired him to organize young people and work toward social awakening in Goa. During the Goan independence movement, he provided assistance to underground activists and made efforts to establish Marathi-medium schools in rural areas.

Following the independence of Goa on 19 December 1961, Bandodkar founded the Maharashtrawadi Gomantak Party (MGP) in 1963. He was a staunch supporter of merging Goa into the state of Maharashtra. In the general elections held in December 1963, the MGP defeated the Indian National Congress, securing 14 out of 30 seats. With the support of three independent members, the MGP formed a majority government. Although Bandodkar had not contested the election himself, he accepted the request of his party workers and became the first Chief Minister of Goa in 1963.

As Chief Minister, his primary political objective remained the merger of Goa with Maharashtra, and he sought to win public support for this cause. The Central Government decided to conduct an opinion poll to let the public decide the territory's future. To ensure the poll was conducted in an impartial and fair atmosphere, Bandodkar resigned from the position of Chief Minister on 3 December 1966.

=== Opinion poll and second term (1967 onwards) ===
Following his resignation, President's rule was imposed in Goa for a period of six months. During this time, in his capacity as the president of the MGP, Bandodkar visited rural areas to campaign in favour of merging Goa with Maharashtra. His proposal to merge Goa with Maharashtra was met with stiff opposition from the native Goans, led by his political rival Jack de Sequeira and the United Goans Party (UGP). Indira Gandhi, the then Prime Minister of India then offered him two options:

1. To retain Goa's current status as a union territory.
2. To merge Goa into the neighbouring state of Maharashtra and the other erstwhile Portuguese enclaves of Daman and Diu into the neighbouring state of Gujarat.

A law to conduct a referendum to decide the issue of merger or otherwise of Goa, Daman and Diu with Maharashtra/Gujarat was passed by both the houses of the Parliament of India, the Lok Sabha (on 1 December 1966), and the Rajya Sabha (on 7 December 1966) and the same received the assent of the President of India, Sarvepalli Radhakrishnan on 16 December 1966. An opinion poll was subsequently held on 16 January 1967 to decide the fate of the union territory which voted to retain its separate status by 34,021 votes.

In the subsequent legislative elections held in April 1967, Bandodkar contested as an MGP candidate and was elected by a majority, assuming office as the Chief Minister of Goa for a second term.

== Reforms and developmental work ==
During his tenure as Chief Minister, Bandodkar introduced numerous reforms and developmental schemes aimed at the comprehensive growth of Goa. His administration focused on the following areas:

- Agriculture and fisheries: He introduced initiatives to boost and incentivize agricultural production and the fishing industry.
- Education: Along with expanding educational facilities in rural localities, he promoted technical and medical education.
- Culture and arts: To encourage music, theatre, dance, and literature, he established the Kala Academy in Goa.
- Tourism and economy: He supported local entrepreneurs and formulated various schemes to attract tourists to Goa.

Bandodkar was widely recognized for his philanthropy and provided financial assistance to various educational and sports institutions.

== Personal life ==
In June 1931, Bandodkar married Sushilabai (later known as Sunanda), the daughter of Laxman Pednekar. The couple had four daughters, Shashikala, Usha, Kranti, and Jyoti, and a son named Siddharth, who died at a young age. His daughter, Shashikala, went on to become the Chief Minister of Goa. Outside of his political career, Bandodkar had a personal interest in cricket, reading, hunting, and fine food.

== Death ==
Bandodkar died from a heart attack at Goa Medical College in Bambolim, Goa, while in office on 12 August 1973 at age 62 and was succeeded by his eldest daughter Shashikala Kakodkar. His only son Siddharth married the actress Leena Chandavarkar on 8 December 1975, but died at the age of 25, on 7 November 1976 due to a gunshot wound he had received on 18 December 1975.

== Legacy ==
Preceded by Post created	Chief Minister of Goa; 1963–1973	Succeeded by Shashikala Kakodkar
