= St. Britto High School, Mapusa =

Location
- Mapusa, Goa; India; 15°35′34″N 73°48′42″E

Information
- Other name: St. Britto; St. Britto's
- Former name: Sacred Heart High School
- Type: Private primary and secondary school
- Motto: Latin: Facta Non Verb (Deed, not words)
- Religious affiliation: Catholicism
- Denomination: Jesuits
- Patron saint: St. John de Britto
- Established: 22 June 1946; 80 years ago
- Authority: Goa Board of Secondary and Higher Secondary
- Principal: Fr. Bazil Vago, SJ
- Staff: 42 teachers
- Grades: 1-10
- Gender: Boys
- Website: www.stbritto.com

St. Britto High School, Mapusa. commonly known as St. Britto or St. Britto's, is a private Catholic kindergarten, primary and secondary school for boys located in Mapusa, Goa, on the west coast of India. It was founded in 1946 and is run by the Society of Jesus (Jesuits). It is all-boys and includes nursery till grade ten. In 2017 all 142 graduates passed the secondary exam.

== History ==
Indo-Portuguese historian Dr. Teotonio de Souza, part of the school's staff in the 1970s, says this was the third institution set up by the Jesuits in Goa. Its founding was assisted by Valentino Pinto, a wine-merchant of Mapusa. Initially, the school was called Sacred Heart High School. Its original owner faced difficulties in staffing and running it, and handed it over to the Jesuits on 22 June 1946, in Portuguese-ruled Goa. Dom Caetano Menezes, the owner of St. Mary's school nearby, also handed over his institution to the Jesuits. The school's name was changed to St. Britto High School on 18 May 1948.

== Early days ==
Dr. Teotonio R. de Souza suggests that the reputation of the Jesuits in Goa had been on the rise with their management of Theotonio High School, owned by the Goa Archdiocese.

Fr. Sylvester D'Souza was the first principal of the schools taken over, and both were initially co-educational. The Jesuits transferred the girls from the schools to the Apostolic Carmel (AC) nuns, already active in education in Goa, who went on to form the St. Mary's Convent High School, also at Mapusa along the Altinho hilltop where St. Britto is itself located.

Initially, St Britto's functioned from the Bardez Gymkhana site. Priests running the school and boarders rented houses atop the hill, an inconvenient arrangement especially during Goa's torrential monsoons. The new site of the school was purchased from Cipriano da Cunha Gomes. The Goa Archdiocese assisted construction with a loan. Fr. Ubaldo de Sá, of Moira, is credited with the construction.

The school's large facade dominates the town of Mapusa from a distance.

== Coat of arms ==
The School Coat of Arms is divided thus:
At the top, against a field of blue, is the monogram of the Society of Jesus, in a golden sun: IHS (the Greek shortform for the name of Jesus), surmounted by a cross. Below that, against a field of golden yellow, are the palms of martyrdom, which pay tribute to the Patron of the School, St. John de Britto. A red chevron separates the lamp of learning (to dispel darkness and ignorance) at the bottom of the coat of arms. At the bottom is the school motto, "Facta non Verba" on the scroll below the coat of arms, which means Deeds Not Words.

== Activities and sports ==
The school has a Consumer Club and Eco Club, but emphasizes seasonal events and celebrations in which the whole school participates: Swachha Bharat Day, St. Ignatius day, Goa Liberation Day, and Christmas festivities including a carol competition.

Intramural sports include football, table tennis, badminton, chess, and basketball. Students are also trained after school hours in cricket, basketball, kabaddi, touch rugby, throw ball, net ball, sepak takraw, and boxing.

== Headmasters ==
- Fr.Sylvester D'Souza, SJ 1946–1949
- Fr.Irineu Lobo, SJ 1949–1950
- Fr.Edward V D'Souza, SJ 1950–1951
- Fr.Peter Mendonça, SJ 1951–1952
- Fr.Edward V D'Souza 1952–1962
- Fr.Lino D'Souza, SJ 1962–1964
- Fr.Mario C de Meyrelles, SJ 1964–1973
- Fr.Teotonio de Sales, SJ 1973–1976
- Fr.Vincent Gomes Catao, SJ 1976–1982
- Fr.Anil Soares, SJ 1982–1988
- Fr.Joe Palliparambil, SJ 1988–1990
- Fr.Abraham Painumkal, SJ 1990–1999
- Fr.Apollo Cardozo, SJ 1999–2011
- Fr.Cedric Fernandes: 2011–2020
- Fr. Simon L de Melo, SJ 2020–2024
- Fr. Basil Vago, SJ 2024 - Present

== Notable alumni ==
- Francis D'Souza – former Deputy Chief Minister of Goa and Member of the Legislative Assembly.
- Roy de Souza – director of Resicom Builders.

== See also ==
- List of Jesuit schools
