= Aisha de Sequeira =

Indian investment banker (1969–2020)

- De Sequeira at the WEF in 2010
- Born: Julia Maria Aisha de Sequeira; 22 November 1969; Goa, India
- Died: 10 December 2020 (aged 51); New York City, U.S.
- Education: Goa Engineering College (B.E.); Yale School of Management
- Occupation: Investment banker
- Employer: Morgan Stanley
- Known for: Mergers and Acquisitions in India
- Spouse: Roy de Souza (m. 2008)
- Children: 3
- Father: Erasmo de Sequeira
- Relatives: Jack de Sequeira (grandfather); Fitz de Souza (father-in-law)

Julia Maria Aisha de Sequeira (22 November 1969 – 10 December 2020) was an Indian investment banker. She was the co-head of Morgan Stanley India from 2013 through 2020. In 2007, she became the founding head of investment banking for Morgan Stanley India, and continued in this position until her death in 2020.

She was ranked on Fortune India's 50 Most Powerful Women from 2012 through 2020.

== Early life ==
De Sequeira was born and raised in Goa, India. She studied at Our Lady of the Rosary High School and Dhempe College of Science & Arts, then completed a Bachelor of Engineering in Electronics and Telecommunications at Goa Engineering College. She graduated from Yale School of Management with a Master's degree in public and private management in 1995. Her grandfather, Jack de Sequeira, was president of the United Goans Party. Her father Erasmo de Sequeira was an MP from 1967 to 1977.

== Career ==
De Sequeira first worked at Morgan Stanley in 1994, where she completed an internship while in business school. She joined the firm full-time in New York City when she graduated the following year, becoming an associate in their Investment Banking group. A few months later, she moved to the Mergers & Acquisitions (M&A) group, where she would continue until 2007.

In 2007, Morgan Stanley ended its eight-year-old Indian joint venture with Nimesh Kampani's JM Financial Group, and received a merchant banking license from the SEBI for a wholly owned subsidiary. De Sequeira, then a Managing Director in New York City, was transferred to Mumbai to be the Head of Investment Banking at the new company. Three months after her transfer, the company was caught by the 2008 financial crisis; while deals were scarce, De Sequeira's team was able to find contacts with potential clients. Hence, they were ready when the markets began to recover in 2009, and it was called the top firm in the capital markets in India after advising 17 deals in nine months. In 2011, Morgan Stanley topped three Indian banking deal league tables, with the Times Of India featuring de Sequeira as the head of Mergers and Acquisitions. Morgan Stanley had nearly 30% of the market by value, advising on business deals worth $11.2bn.

In 2013, de Sequeira became the co-head of Morgan Stanley India in addition to her Investment Banking position. She continued in both roles through December 2020. Under De Sequeira's leadership, Morgan Stanley India maintained its status as a prominent M&A advisory firm, and became the top firm in the country again in 2017. The company advised over $70 billion of deals, such as the investments by Facebook, Inc. and Google into Jio; Ford Motor Company's sale of Jaguar Land Rover to Tata Group, and the merger of Idea Cellular and Vodafone India.

De Sequeira was one of Fortune India's 50 Most Powerful Women from 2012 through 2020. When the Economic Times introduced their first women-only awards in 2019, the ET Prime Women Leadership Awards, De Sequeira served on the selection committee in 2019 and 2020. She was also a member of the Young Presidents' Organization. Indra Nooyi, also a Yale SOM alumna, was a friend and mentor.

== Personal life ==
De Sequeira was a fluent speaker of Konkani. She married entrepreneur Roy de Souza, the founder of Zedo, in 2008. They had three sons Erasmo, Nathan and Alexander. Her father-in-law, Fitz de Souza, a Kenyan lawyer-turned-politician, died in March 2020. Her cousin, Jack Ajit Sukhija, through her paternal aunt Lily, serves as a councilor in the Corporation of the City of Panaji.

== Death ==
De Sequeira was diagnosed with colon cancer in 2017. She died on 10 December 2020 in New York City. Her family received condolences on Twitter from the Chief Minister of Goa Pramod Sawant and former Chief Minister Digambar Kamat.
