= Jack de Sequeira =

Indian politician and businessman (1915–1989)

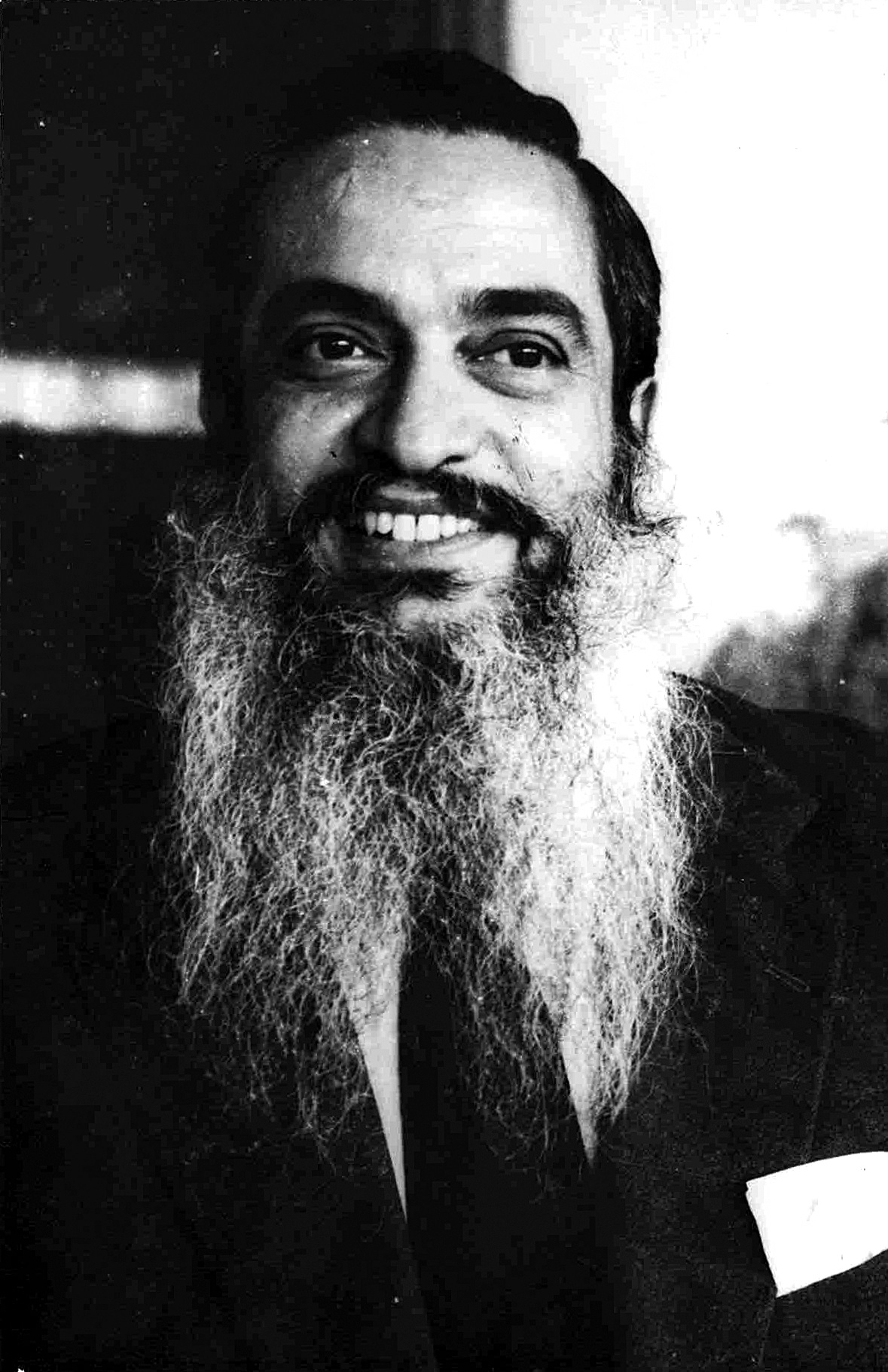
- De Sequeira during his later years

Leader of the Opposition, Goa, Daman and Diu Legislative Assembly
- In office 20 December 1963 – September 1974
- Governor: Kunhiraman Palat Candeth; T. Sivasankar; M. R. Sachdev; Hari Sharma; K. R. Damle; Nakul Sen; S. K. Banerji
- Chief Minister: Dayanand Bandodkar
- Preceded by: Office established
- Succeeded by: Babu Naik

Member of Goa, Daman and Diu Legislative Assembly
- In office 20 December 1963 – January 1967
- Preceded by: Office established
- Succeeded by: Yaswant Desai
- Constituency: Panaji
- In office April 1967 – 1980
- Preceded by: Joaquim Araujo
- Succeeded by: Michael Fernandes
- Constituency: Santa Cruz

Personal details
- Born: João Hugo Eduardo de Sequeira; 20 April 1915 Rangoon, British India
- Died: 17 October 1989 (aged 74) Goa, India
- Party: Janata Party (1977–1979)
- Other political affiliations: United Goans Party (1963–1977)
- Spouse: Lilia Margarida de Gouveia Pinto (m. 1938)
- Children: 9, including Erasmo
- Relatives: Aisha de Sequeira (granddaughter); Roy de Souza (grandson-in-law)
- Education: Escola Médico-Cirúrgica de Goa (M.D.)
- Occupation: Politician; businessman
- Website: drjackdesequeira.com

João Hugo Eduardo de Sequeira (Goan Konkani: Jak Siker; 20 April 1915 – 17 October 1989), better known as Dr. Jack de Sequeira, was an Indian politician and businessman who is widely considered in Goa to be the "Father of the Opinion Poll", which led to the former union territory attaining statehood in 1987. De Sequeira was Goa's first Leader of the Opposition when the inaugural Goa, Daman and Diu Legislative Assembly was launched in 1963. He was born to Goan immigrant parents in British Burma, at that time still a province of British India.

== Early life ==
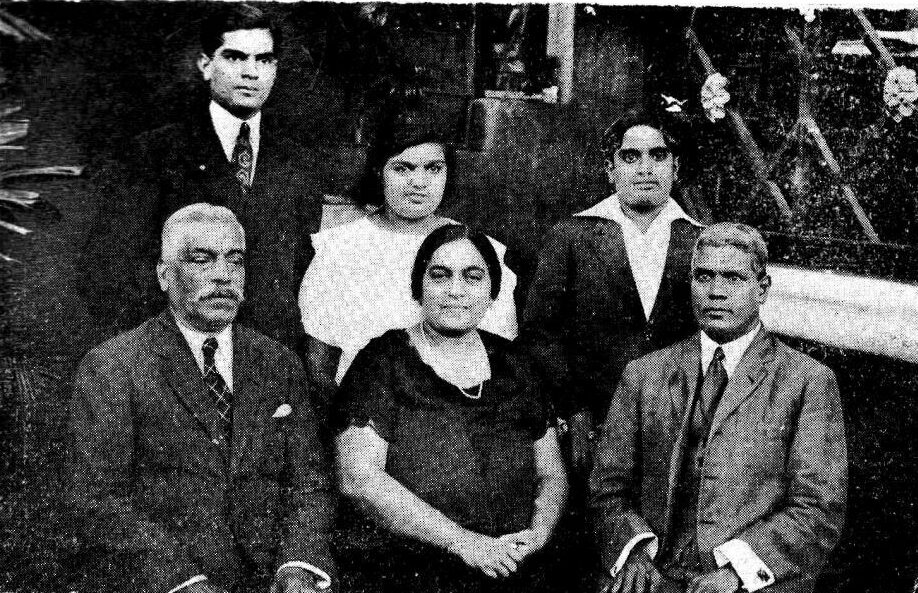
De Sequeira (top right) along with his siblings, parents and uncle.

João Hugo Eduardo de Sequeira was born in Rangoon,British India (present-day Yangon, Myanmar) on 20 April 1915, to Erasmo de Sequeira, a businessman, and Ana Julia de Sa e Sequeira into a Goan Catholic family. He was the youngest among his other two siblings. His elder brother, Frank was a medical doctor. After completing schooling in Portuguese medium at the Liceu Nacional Afonso de Albuquerque, de Sequeira studied medicine at Escola Médica de Goa. However, his father died when he was 21, forcing him to discontinue studies in order to look after the family business.

== Political career ==
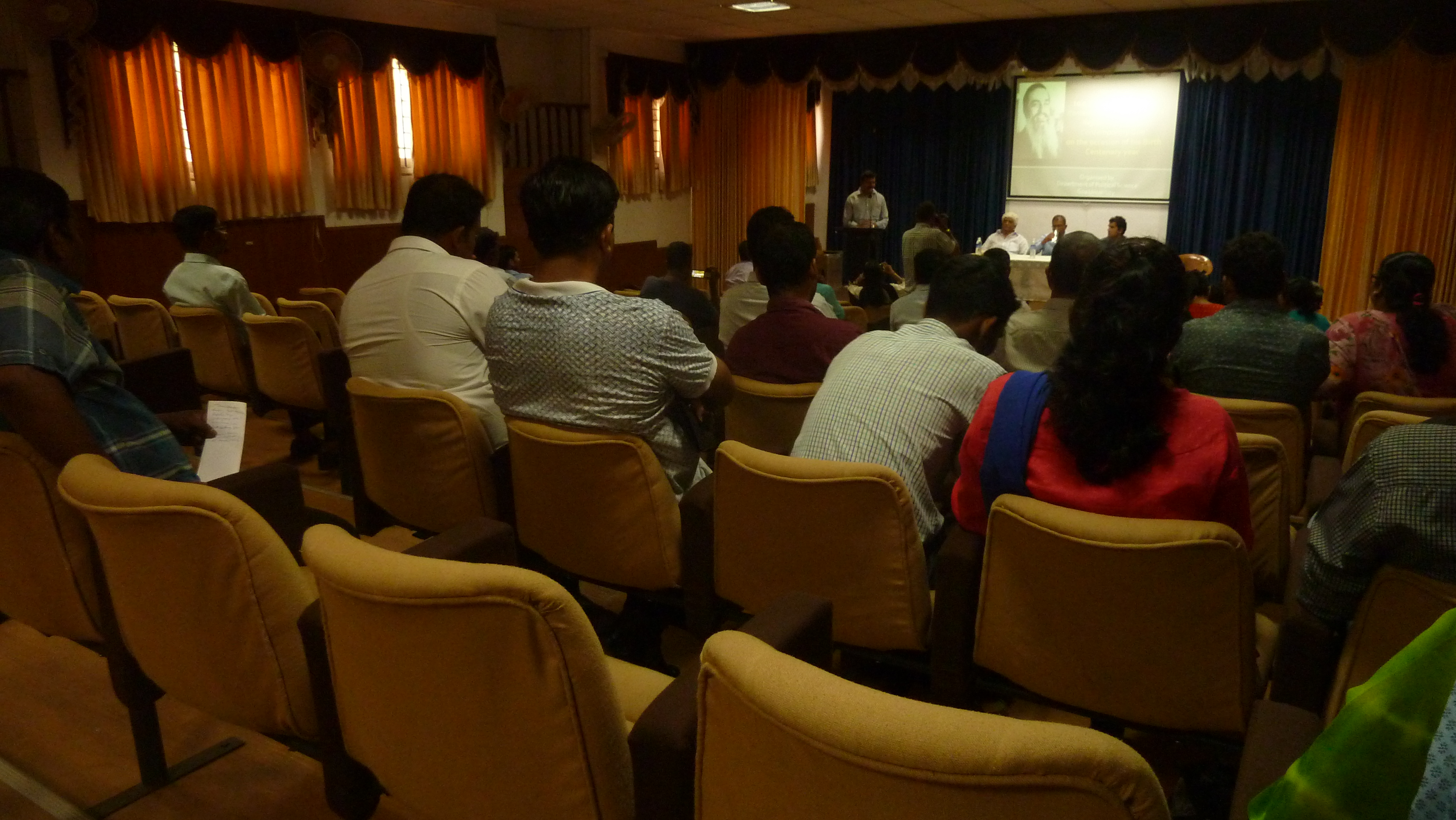
Remembering de Sequeira, at the Goa University, 2015

De Sequeira was the leader of a group known as Goyncho Pokx, which later merged with other groups to form the United Goans Party (UGP or UG Party). He represented Santa Cruz assembly constituency three times. He lost in the fourth attempt in 1979 and did not contest elections again.

=== United Goans Party ===
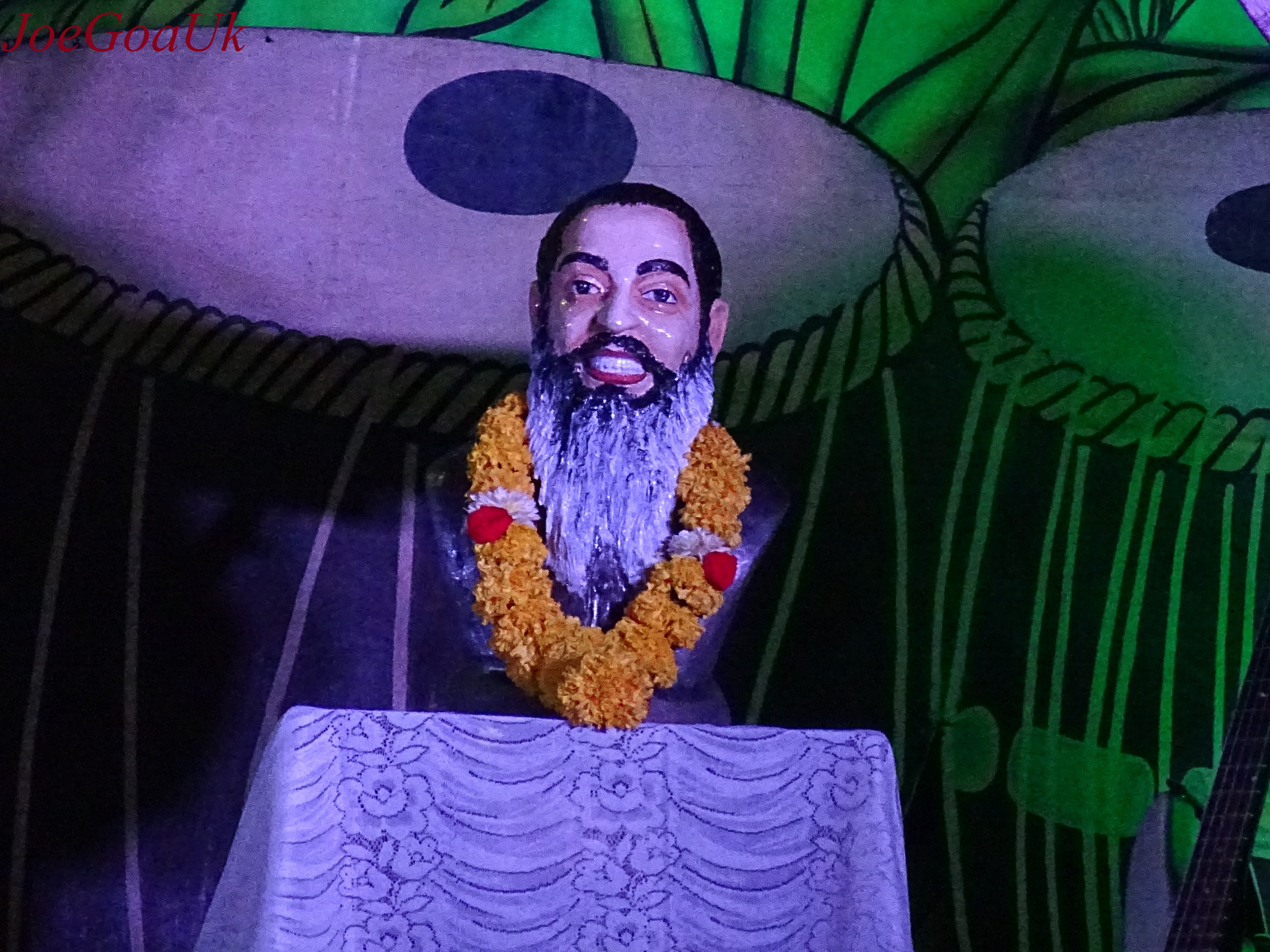
De Sequeira' bust at a function, 2015.

De Sequeira was the founder president of the United Goans Party. He contributed to the convincing of the Government of India to hold an opinion poll to decide the issue of the merger of Goa into the state of Maharashtra.

== Personal life ==
At the age of 23, de Sequeira married Lilia Margarida de Gouveia Pinto. They had three sons and six daughters: Erasmo, a fellow politician; Jack, Jose, Julia "Julie", a physician; Margarida, Teresa, Lilia "Lily", a paediatrician; Joana, and Manuela. His granddaughter through Erasmo was Aisha, an investment banker at Morgan Stanley India. As of 2026, his grandson, Jack Ajit Sukhija, through Lily, served as a councilor in the Corporation of the City of Panaji.

De Sequeira was a polyglot who was fluent in five languages: Konkani, Hindustani, Portuguese, English, and French.

== Role in Goa Opinion Poll (1963–1966) ==
Goa was annexed into India by an Indian Army operation on 19 December 1961. It was integrated into the Indian Union in 1962. Goa's first polls were held on 9 December 1963. The two main parties UGP and MGP were formed with two opposing ideologies. The MGP wanted to merge the state of Goa into the newly formed state of Maharashtra whereas UGP wanted to retain independent statehood for the former Portuguese enclaves.

The United Goans Party (UGP) was formed in 1962-63 following the merger of three local parties. De Sequeira was its founding president. Of the 30 seats in the assembly 28 belonged to Goa, and one each to Daman and Diu. MGP formed the government, having secured 16 seats while UGP secured 12. The assembly of Goa, Daman and Diu convened on 9 January 1964. Dayanand Bandodkar of MGP became the first Chief Minister.

The MGP and politicians in Maharashtra were elated at the victory and touted it as a mandate that the majority of Goans were in favour of merger. At the time of Goa's accession into India, Prime Minister Jawaharlal Nehru had categorically stated that Goa would retain its distinct identity. Following MGP's victory and the raised pitch for merger. De Sequeira visited New Delhi along with his MLAs and impressed Nehru about the need of an opinion poll on this matter. However Nehru died before Parliament could take this decision and Lal Bahadur Shastri succeeded him as Prime Minister. A delegation consisting of MGP MLAs and Maharashtra's leaders went to New Delhi to convince him that a vote on the merger should be conducted in the Goa Assembly.

De Sequeira, along with others went to Bangalore where an AICC session was being held and met Shastri. They opposed the move to get the merger voted in the Assembly and impressed on Shastri and Kamraj, the need to put this question before the people of Goa themselves. De Sequeira shrewdly managed to get the backing of the legislators of Mysore state (now Karnataka). He impressed them that if Maharashtra managed to convince the centre to merge Goa into Maharashra, it would only bolster their case for Karwar and Supa.

However Shastri died in 1966 in Tashkent and this decision was now left to the new Prime Minister Indira Gandhi. Again de Sequeira and his legislators met the new Prime Minister and submitted a memorandum that such a monumental decision affecting the future of the State could not be left to legislators alone, but should be put before the people to decide. The referendum could be conducted via a signature campaign or by secret ballot. Since a large number of Goans worked outside Goa, and indeed, outside India itself as expats, UGP demanded that these expats should be allowed to vote by postal ballot. Parliament finally agreed to conduct a referendum by means of secret ballot but ruled out postal ballots.

Now that the referendum would be conducted, de Sequeira feared that Bandodkar may use the state's administrative and law-enforcement machinery to browbeat the anti-mergerists into submission. The UGP demanded that the MGP government resign so that the referendum could be conducted in a free-and-fair atmosphere. On 3 December 1966, the MGP government resigned. De Sequeira also traveled extensively exhorting people to vote against the merger. In this cause, he also visited places such as Colaba and Kalyan in Bombay, convincing Goans staying there to support the cause.

The Goa Opinion Poll was held on 16 January 1967. A total of 3,17,633 votes were polled. The merger was defeated by 34,021 votes.

== Electoral performance (1963–1977) ==
In 1963, de Sequeira won Panjim with 2761 votes (42.02%) as against 2347 for the MGP (35.72%), 1371 for the Congress (20.87%) and 91 votes (1.39%) for Independents.

In 1967, 1972 and 1977, de Sequeira contested the Santa Cruz constituency, for the first two times on a UGP ticket, and on a Janata Party ticket on the last occasion, after the merger of the UGP into the Janata Party.

In 1967, he got 7087 (59.94%) votes, as against 121 (1.02%) by the MGP, and 570 (4.82%) by Independents. His main rival was a UG (Furtado) candidate, contesting on behalf of a party that had broken away from his. The UG (Furtado) party won 4045 votes (34.21%).

In the 1972 elections, he retained the seat with 6586 votes (57.51%), with his closest Independent rival gaining 4483 (39.15%) votes.

In 1977, de Sequeira retained Santa Cruz with 4462 votes (46.11%), beating the MGP which scored 2656 (27.45%) votes.

== Reception ==
In his analysis of the 1963 Goa, Daman and Diu elections, Ram Joshi argues that the

urban Hindu elite, perhaps more ambitious politically, was more inclined to vote for a party which stood for separate statehood. Many of them supported the United Goans which explains the success of Dr. Jack Sequeira, the leader of the United Goans Party, in Panjim where there were only 2,839 Christian voters as against 5,130 Hindu voters

== Death ==
De Sequeira died from a heart attack on 17 October 1989, aged 74.

== Legacy ==
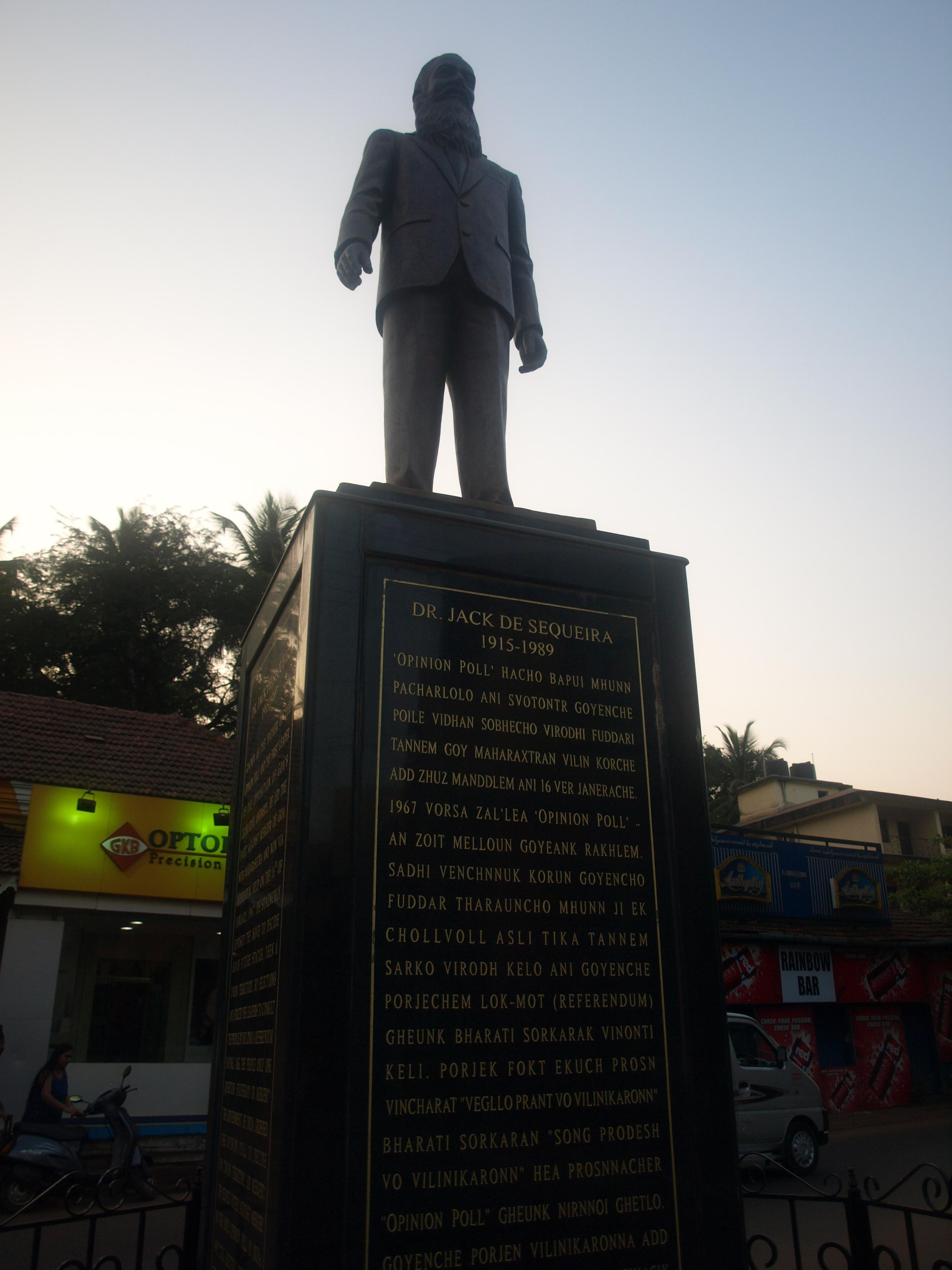
Statue of de Sequeira at Calangute.

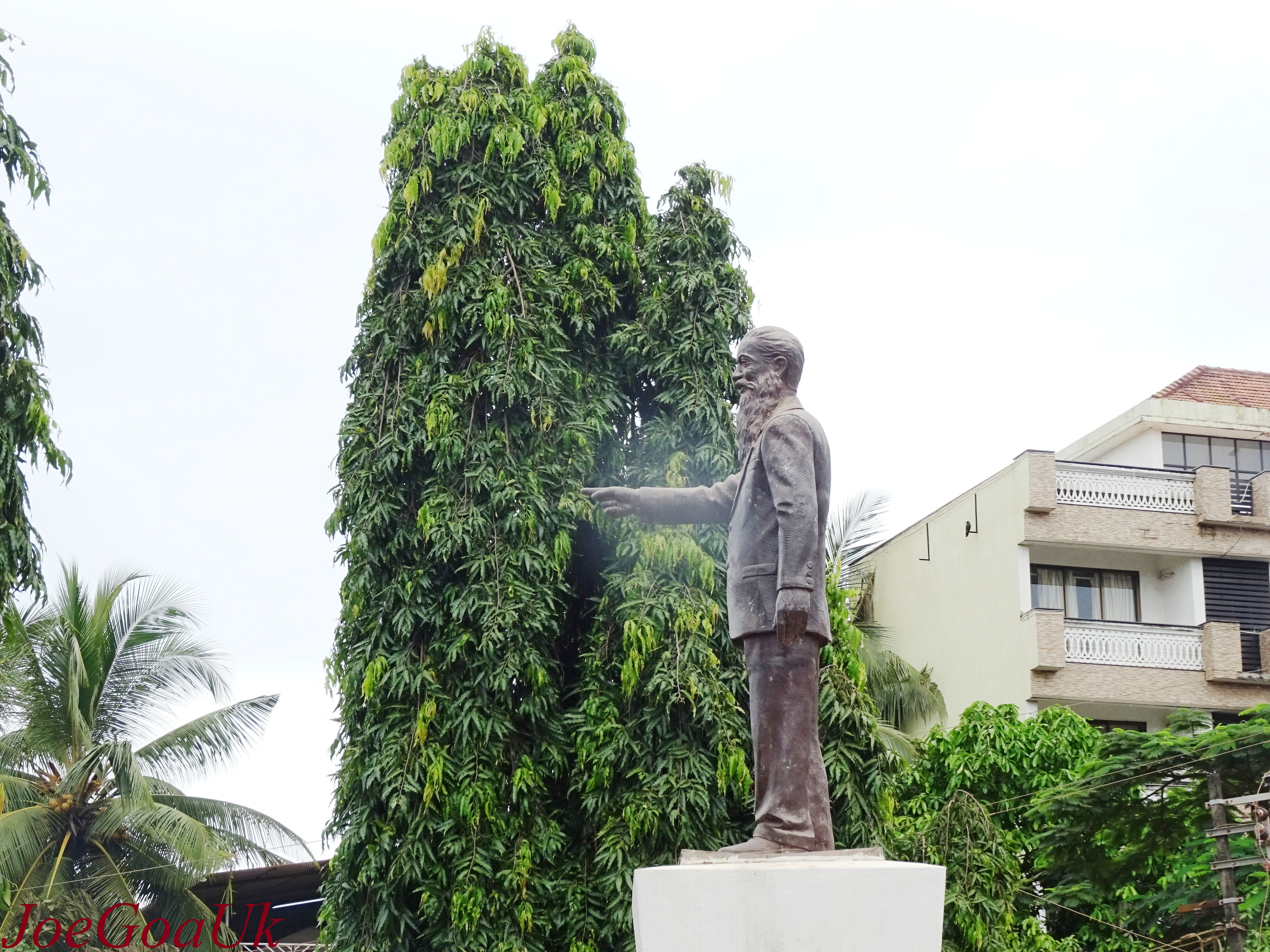
Statue at Dona Paula, 2016

On 16 January 2007, a life sized statue of de Sequeira was inaugurated at Calangute. Another statue was inaugurated on 20 April 2007 at Dona Paula. The cost of the statue was borne by his family and not by the government. A third statue, the first in South Goa, was installed in Ambelim. The road from Miramar to Dona Paula and Merces junction to Merces has also been named after him. On 16 January 2026 a bust of Dr. Jack de Sequeira was inaugurated in his ancestral village of Moira, Goa where his family originated from.
