= Mukund Shinkre =

Indian politician and lawyer

Member of Parliament, Lok Sabha
- In office 1963–1967
- Succeeded by: Erasmo de Sequeira
- Constituency: South Goa Lok Sabha constituency

Mukund Shinkre was an Indian politician and lawyer. He was the first Member of Parliament to represent the South Goa Lok Sabha constituency in 1963.

Shinkre won the election in December 1963 representing the Maharashtrawadi Gomantak Party (MGP). He polled 48,798 votes, which was 39% of the vote share and was a lead of 2851 votes over Alvaro de Loyola Furtado of the United Goans Party.

Shinkre was a lawyer by profession.
