= St. Mary's Convent High School, Goa =

St. Mary's Convent High School

Location
- Mapusa, Goa; India; 15.591778°N 73.815667°E

Information
- Type: Private
- Motto: In Virtues Shines Beauty
- Established: 1948
- Head of school: Sr. M. Snehala A.C.
- Grades: Class 1 - 10
- Enrollment: 769
- Campus size: 1-acre (4,000 m^{2})
- Affiliation: CBSE

St. Mary's Convent High School is a school for girls in the North Goa town of Mapusa, India.

== History ==
=== Foundation ===
The school was set up in 1948 in the then Portuguese colony of Goa, when formal schooling for women was unusual. It was launched by the Apostolic Carmel Congregation of Mangalore.

On 1 January 1948, two nuns – Mother Mercedes who later became the first Superior of St Mary's and Sr Agusta – were sent from Mangalore to Margao where they joined two other members of the Congregation, Sr Nympha and Sr Ephigenia. The four went to Mapusa and together founded the school, which completed six decades of service in 2008.

Some 130 girls were taken over from the nearby Jesuit school currently called St Britto. By June 1948, the student number rose to 187. The first inspection took place in October of that year, though the school was not yet officially recognised. Facing a lack of water, very little money, and hard times, they were housed in the building which would later become the kindergarten.

In 1950, the school opened a boarding house with six boarders. On 28 August 1950, the school was officially recognised. In 1952, the convent sent up its first batch of 14 students for the Matriculation examination.

=== More students, Lyceum building ===
By 1959, the nuns had a chance to extend their education to more girls. In 1963, they were able to move into the Lyceum building. Following the end of Portuguese rule in Goa, Mapusa developed into a centre for the surrounding areas. Public transport improved and many more students joined the school.

=== Land near the convent ===
Help came in the form of land next to the convent, which by now was located some distance from the school. This was a gift from the family of Sisters Carmela AC and Rosanne AC.

Plans for the new school were drawn up, but the prospects of raising the Rs 48,00,000 did not seem promising. However, in the space of two years a structure was built near the convent. Sr Marcilla took over as principal in 1989 and Sr Thelma was superior.
