= Fitz de Souza =

Kenyan lawyer and politician (1929–2020)

Personal details
- Born: Fitzval Remedios Santana Neville de Souza; 1929 Bombay, British India
- Died: 23 March 2020 (aged 90–91) London, England
- Children: 2, including Roy
- Relatives: Aisha de Sequeira (daughter-in-law)
- Education: London School of Economics (Ph.D.)
- Occupation: Lawyer; politician

Fitzval Remedios Santana Neville de Souza (1929 – 23 March 2020), better known as F.R.S. de Souza or Fitz de Souza, was a Kenyan lawyer and politician who was an important figure in the campaign for independence for Kenya, a member of the Kenyan parliament in the 1960s and Deputy Speaker for several years. He helped provide a legal defence for those accused of Mau Mau activities including the Kapenguria Six, and he was one of the people involved in the Lancaster House conferences held to draw up a constitutional framework for Kenyan independence.

== Early life ==
Born to a Goan family in Bombay, de Souza lived in Zanzibar before settling in Kenya in 1942. Fitz de Souza took a first degree in England and trained as a barrister at Lincoln's Inn. As a young man in 1952 he joined a team of lawyers from various Commonwealth countries, including the British barrister Denis Nowell Pritt and other lawyers educated in England but not born there, defending Kenyans accused of Mau Mau activities by the British colonial administration, in a series of trials including that of Jomo Kenyatta.

== Life in Kenya ==
Feelings in the country were running high, with some settlers of European ancestry disrupting any legal process for people they considered assassins, while other people in Kenya were convinced of bad faith amongst those involved in the all-white British prosecution. In this atmosphere, de Souza and an Asian colleague faced implied allegations of 'encouraging' defendants to criticise police witnesses, but judges at the East African Court of Appeal supported them, praising their assistance to the court.

For part of the 1950s, Fitz de Souza was studying for a PhD at the London School of Economics and was politically active both there and in Kenya. His doctoral thesis was on "Indian Political Organization in East Africa" (1959). He knew Kenyatta and was a major figure in the movement towards an independent Kenya. He has been described during this period both as a "freedom fighter" and as someone "organiz[ing] Africans and Asians against the colour bar".

In the early 1960s he was a legal adviser at the Lancaster House conferences in London where Kenyatta and the Kenyans worked with the UK Colonial Secretary, Reginald Maudling, and his team to develop a constitution for the country. In 2001, de Souza told the Constitution of Kenya Review Commission why he felt the Lancaster House Constitution had been a good constitutional framework, and expressed his disagreement with some subsequent changes, especially the re-introduction of detention without trial. The Ministry of Overseas Indian Affairs has described him as making "a principled exit from public life in the 70s".

De Souza was an elected member of the Kenyan Parliament even before full independence in 1963, and Deputy Speaker of the Lower House from June 1963. He left this post in 1970, spent many years in private practice, before becoming semi-retired. He was married with four grown-up children.

In 2004, he was given a Pravasi Bharatiya Samman award alongside other people honoured for their "outstanding contribution to the understanding of the Indian civilisation and for advancing India's cause abroad" at a conference opened by the Indian prime minister and organised with the aim of "bringing together the Indian Diaspora and leveraging the potential offered by the Global Indian Family".

2005 brought a different kind of publicity when a Pulitzer Prize-winning book written by Caroline Elkins, an associate professor at Harvard, quoted a "respected attorney in Nairobi", de Souza, as believing that at least one hundred thousand Kikuyu disappeared at the time of Mau Mau, in "a form of ethnic cleansing on the part of the British government". These figures have been challenged by John Darwin, a fellow of Nuffield College, and lecturer on the History of the British Commonwealth at the University of Oxford.

In December 2006, Commissioner for Non-Resident Indian affairs (Government of Goa) Eduardo Faleiro announced that de Souza would be one of the eight persons to be honoured during the Global Goans Convention. It was held from 3–5 January 2007. The awards, for the first time, were being given to "eminent non-resident Goans and persons of Goan origin."

== Personal life ==
De Souza and his wife Romola had two sons (including cancer researcher Roy de Souza) and two daughters. He died on 23 March 2020 in London.
