= Erasmo de Sequeira =

Indian politician and social worker (1938–1997)

- De Sequeira in 1971

Member of Parliament Lok Sabha
- In office 1967–1977
- Preceded by: Mukund Shinkre
- Succeeded by: Eduardo Faleiro
- Constituency: Mormugao

Personal details
- Born: 22 December 1938 Nova Goa, Goa, Portuguese India
- Died: 16 July 1997 (aged 58) Campal, Goa, India
- Citizenship: Portuguese (until 1961); Indian (from 1961)
- Other political affiliations: United Goans Party (1967–1977); Bharatiya Lok Dal (1977)
- Spouse: Maureen de Sequeira
- Children: 3, including Aisha
- Parent: Jack de Sequeira (father)
- Relatives: Roy de Souza (son-in-law)

Erasmo Jesus de Sequeira (22 December 1938 – 16 July 1997) was an Indian politician, social worker, and parliamentarian. He represented the Marmagoa parliamentary constituency twice from 1967 to 1977.

== Early life ==
Erasmo Jesus de Sequeira was born on 22 December 1938 in Nova Goa, Portuguese Goa, to Jack de Sequeira and Lilia Margarida de Gouveia Pinto. His father was the founder of the United Goans Party and also the first Leader of Opposition in the Goa assembly, and is popularly known as the Father of the Opinion Poll in Goa.

== Role in the Goa Opinion Poll ==
The United Goans Party was the main proponent of a referendum on the issue of merger of Goa with Maharashtra. During the Goa Opinion Poll, Jack and Erasmo were the leaders of the anti-merger faction. Sequeira pasted posters in the dead of the night. He conducted meetings with other activists to plan strategies. He did the legwork that his father required of him.

== Political career ==
=== As a parliamentarian (1967–1977) ===
De Sequeira was the leader of the United Goans Party (Sequeira Group); which was founded by his father. He represented Marmagoa parliamentary constituency twice between 1967 and 1977. He was also a member of the Parliamentary Estimates Committee between 1968 and 1969.

During his term as a Member of Parliament, de Sequeira advocated greater links with Latin America. He was made the leader of Parliamentary delegations to foreign countries many times; especially when the delegations were sent to Spanish and Portuguese speaking countries.

Although de Sequeira was a member of the Opposition, he was known to be on good terms with Prime Minister Indira Gandhi. During the Emergency, a large number of Opposition leaders were arrested. Erasmo de Sequeria was a notable exception. He became the Opposition's voice in the Parliament.

On one occasion, Gandhi invited de Sequeira to join the Indian National Congress. She assured him that he would be made a Deputy Minister. When he refused, she offered to make him a Minister of State. He refused again, saying that he aimed higher. Indira told him that she could not make him a Cabinet Minister due to his lack of experience. De Sequeira replied that he did not want that either. When Indira finally asked Sequeira what he wanted he replied, "Your chair, madam, your chair!".

=== Second split in UGP (1977) ===
In 1977, Sequeira allied with the Bharatiya Lok Dal, headed by Charan Singh. He did this without consulting his party members. The party members were enraged, causing the UGP (Sequiera group) to split into two groups: UGP (Sequeria Group) and UGP (Naik Group). He lost the next parliamentary election to Eduardo Faleiro of UGP-N in March 1977. In the next Assembly elections, UGP-S managed to win just three seats as compared to UGP-N, which won 10 seats.

== Writing career ==
Sequeira wrote many letters. He was fluent in many Indian and foreign languages. His publications include My Country and Me. He authored many poems in English. He also started a paper called the Goa Monitor in 1977.

He has been described as a "man of letters", and was known for his fluency in many languages.

== Personal life ==
De Sequeira married Maureen, and they had three children: Amita, Anil, and Aisha, a banker at Morgan Stanley India. His nephew, Jack Ajit Sukhija, through his sister Lily, serves as a councilor in the Corporation of the City of Panaji.

== Death ==
De Sequeira died at his residence from a heart attack in Campal, Goa on 16 July 1997.
