= Moira, Goa =

Moira Moiddem
- Village
- Location of Moira in Goa Moira (India)
- Coordinates: 15°35′39″N 73°50′24″E
- Country: India
- State: Goa
- District: North Goa
- Sub-district: Bardez
- Time zone: UTC+5:30 (IST)
- Postcode: 403507
- Area code: 0832

Moira ([mɔjɽɛ̃ː]) is a village in the Bardez Taluka of the North Goa District in India. Till the recent past, Moira has been known for its typical, large bananas (known as Mundollchim kellim in Konkani) that grew in the area.

== Origin of name ==
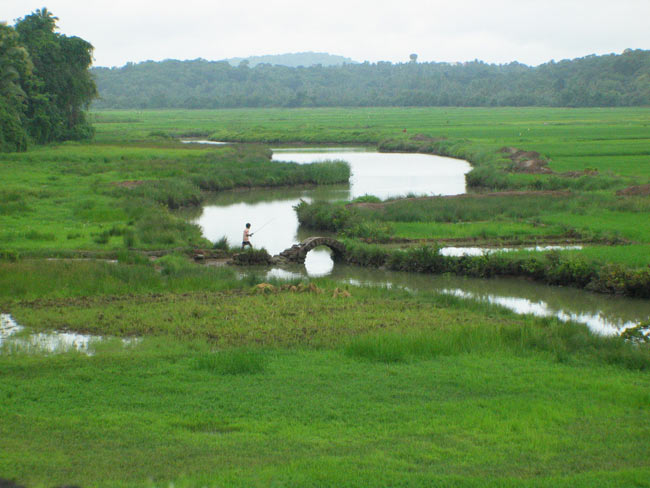
Village setting

The village derives its name from either from 'Moriya', which describes a Mauryan settlement (the 'mor' (transl. peacock) was an important symbol of the Maurya Empire) or from 'Moim', a locality near Tivim (many of Moira's initial settlers came from Tivim).

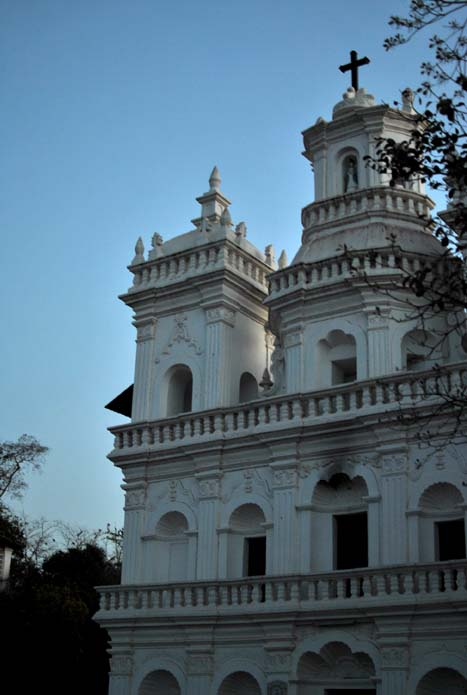
Moira Church at dusk

Historian, the late Dr. Teotónio de Souza, published a brochure on Moirá for its church's 350th anniversary in 1986. His writing on the same subject is also available in a local text recently released.

== Christianity ==
The mass conversions of Moira villagers to Christianity are believed to have happened around 1619, according to De Souza. A deed drawn up in Goa on 14 March 1623 and preserved in the National Library of Lisbon records that Joseph de Coutre (known as "Couto" in Goa) financially assisted the Franciscans to build the first Moira church. This conflicts with the account by Paulo de Trindade, who said that the church was financed entirely by local villagers. The two Flemish brothers—diamond dealers Jacques and Joseph de Coutre—lived in Goa at the time the church was being built.

Although men and women were arrested by the Holy Office of the Inquisition during its auto-da-fé in the cathedral on 7 December 1664, Moira was relatively unscathed by the Portuguese Inquisition.

== Moira in recent times ==
Moira village has seen a lot of out-migration, including as part of early Goan migration to then British-ruled Africa, in the 20th century. In the past two decades or so, other settlers have set up homes in the village. In 2020, the local village club—the Associação Académica de Moira—celebrated its centenary. It is now also home to some prominent centres of art and cuisine.

== Reputation ==
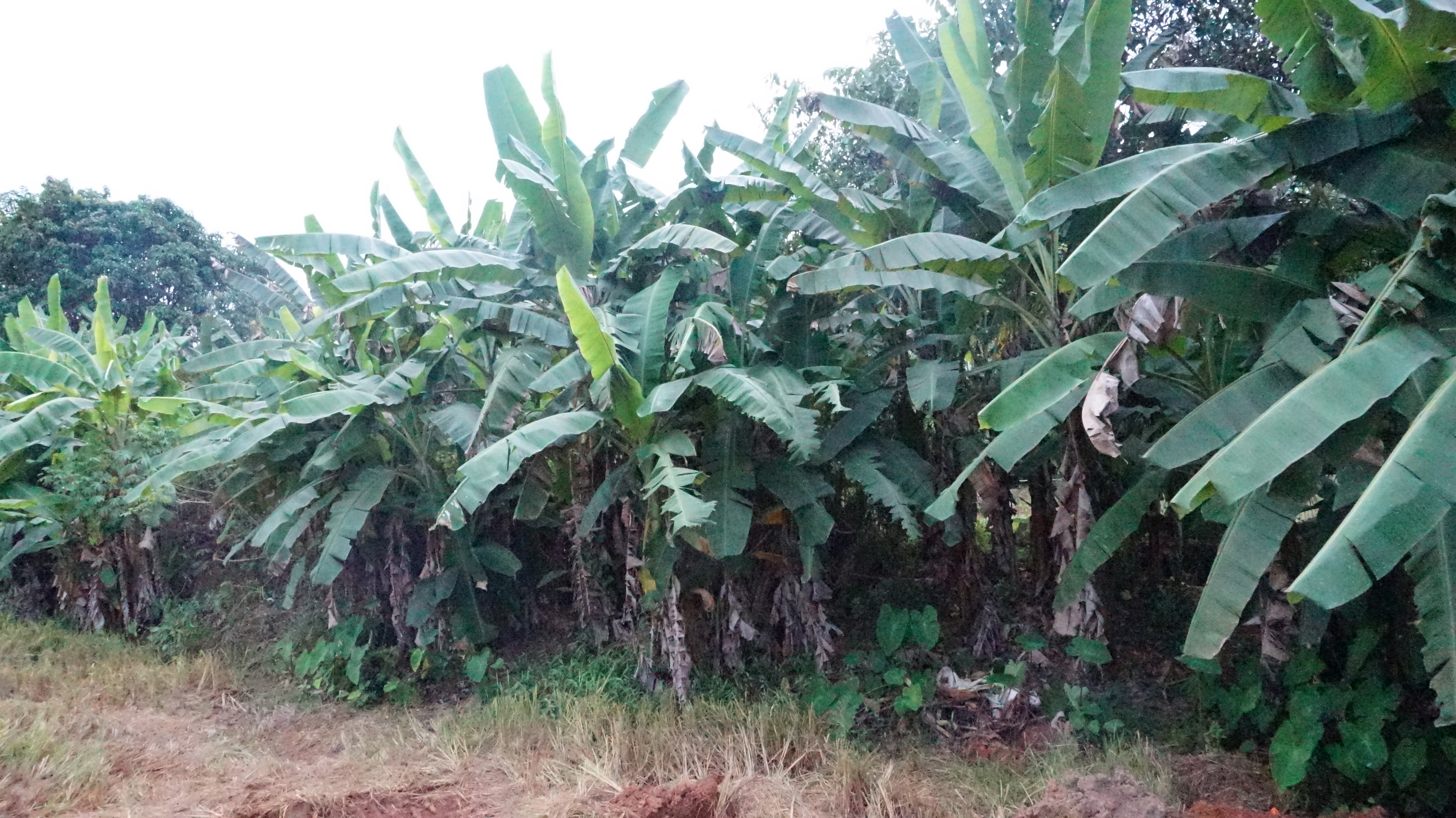
Moira was once famous for its particular variety of bananas, now only few left

In folklore, the residents of the village acquired the reputation of Mad Moidekars or "Wise Fools of Moira", similar to other stories of "town of fools type.

In his essay "The Wise of Moira", Prof Lucio Rodrigues describes the village and its villagers thus:

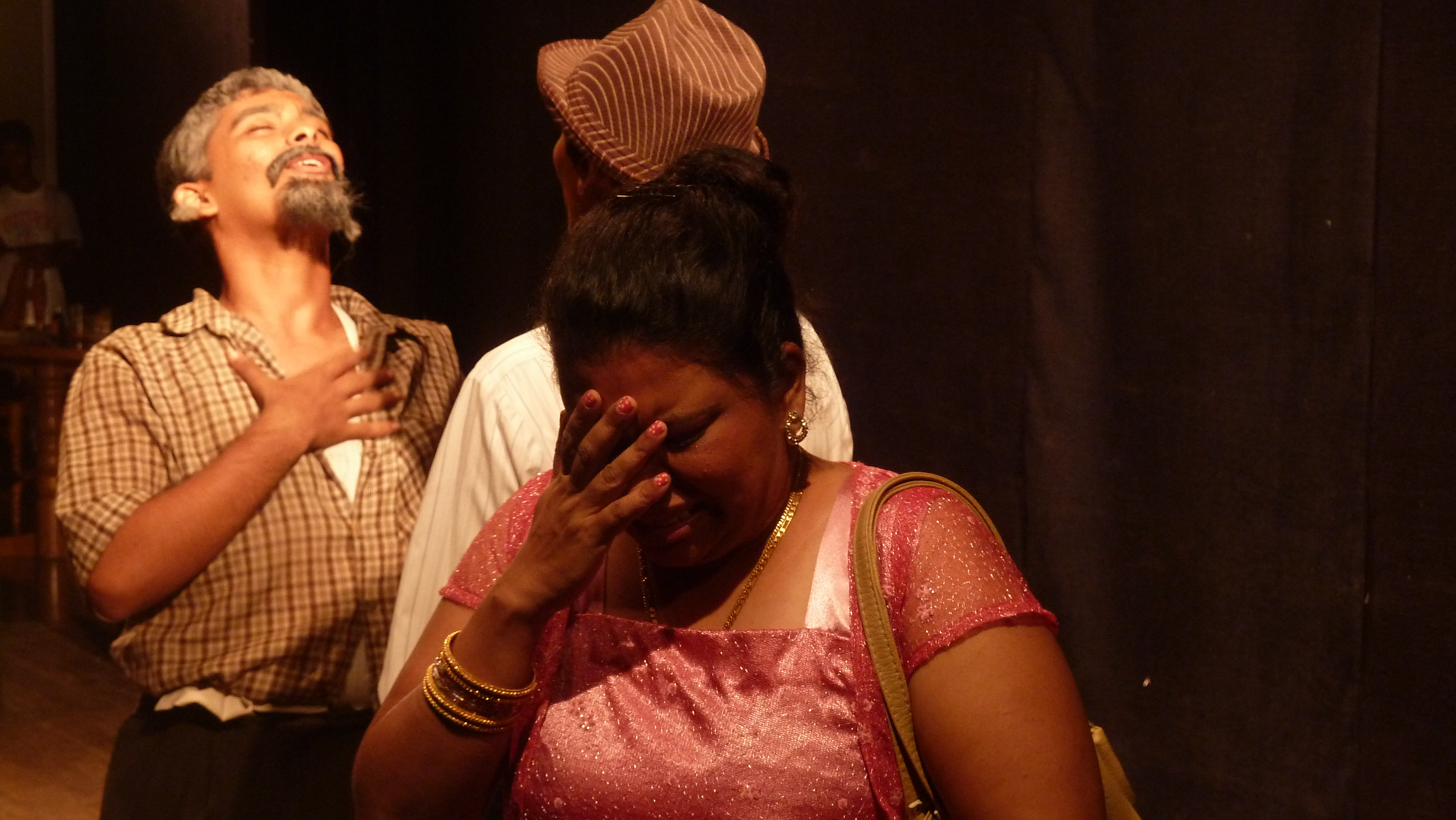
Tiatr Festival 2014, Goa. A Moira troupe performs at the festival of Konkani plays

...the river of Mapusa flows along its southern, western and northern sides, making its soil very fertile. The village is famous for many things, among others for its banana plantations, which yield big, long bananas, called munnouchinz kellim in Konkani, and each fruit is equal to a square meal. Each grows to the length of nearly a foot with a diameter of about two and a half to three inches...

But the bananas are not Moira's chief claim to fame among Goan villages. The people are as famous, if not more than their kellim [bananas], so famous indeed that they have passed into simile and proverb and legend. They are among the most industrious people of Goa. Blessed as they are with fertile land, they have used Nature's gift to raise many crops - rice, chillies, vegetables, bananas. Every Friday will see them wending their way with their produce on their head to the weekly fair at Mapuca. But it is not their industriousness that signals them out for unique honour among their Goan fellows. It is for a legacy that they have inherited from their forefathers - a wisdom that is traditional.

This wisdom has a stamp of its own which defies definition. Perhaps you have heard of the Wise Men of Gotham, and of their ingenious feats. The wise men of Moira of old were as ingenious. There is only one other village in Goa which rivals Moira in this characteristic and that is Benaulim in Salcete. Even in Konkani it has not been possible to give this baffling quality an appropriate term. This is how the people of Bardez describe the indefinite trait. To moiddekar num re, he is a guy from Moira, sarkoch moiddekar, every inch like a guy from Moira; take matxem moiddechem assa, he's got a bit of it from Moira.

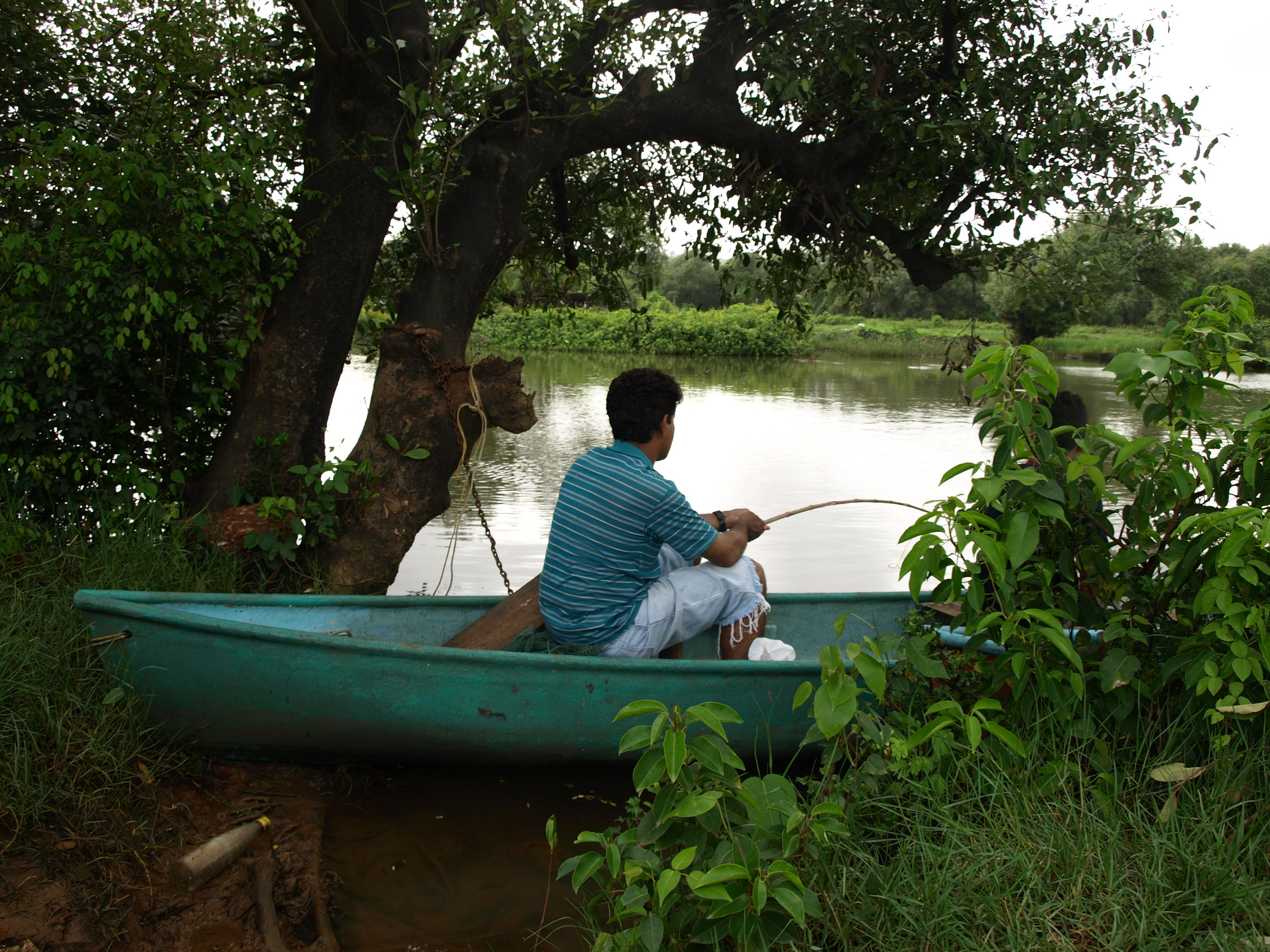
En route to Moira and Aldona

Glenis Maria D'Souza writes of the village and its people: "If you behave a little idiosyncratic [sic] in Goa, don't be surprised if you are called a 'Moidekar'." The villagers are known thus for being hardworking and fun-loving at the same time.

=== Sample stories ===
As the population of Moira grew, the Moidekars realized that their church is too small. After a deliberation they decided that the church will grow larger, just like a tree sapling will grow, if fertilized with manure.

The Moidekars noticed that there is too much space in front of the church and too little in the back, and they could not decide how to fix this. A shrewd sacristan suggested to push the church. In order to mark how far the church must be pushed, the sacristan suggested to spread the blankets for this distance. When all Moidekars went back behind the church for pushing, the sacristan rolled up the blankets and hid them. After a long and hard push the villagers decided to check how far the church moved. They looked in front, saw no blankets, and concluded that the blankets are under the church, meaning they had pushed far enough.

== Families in the area ==
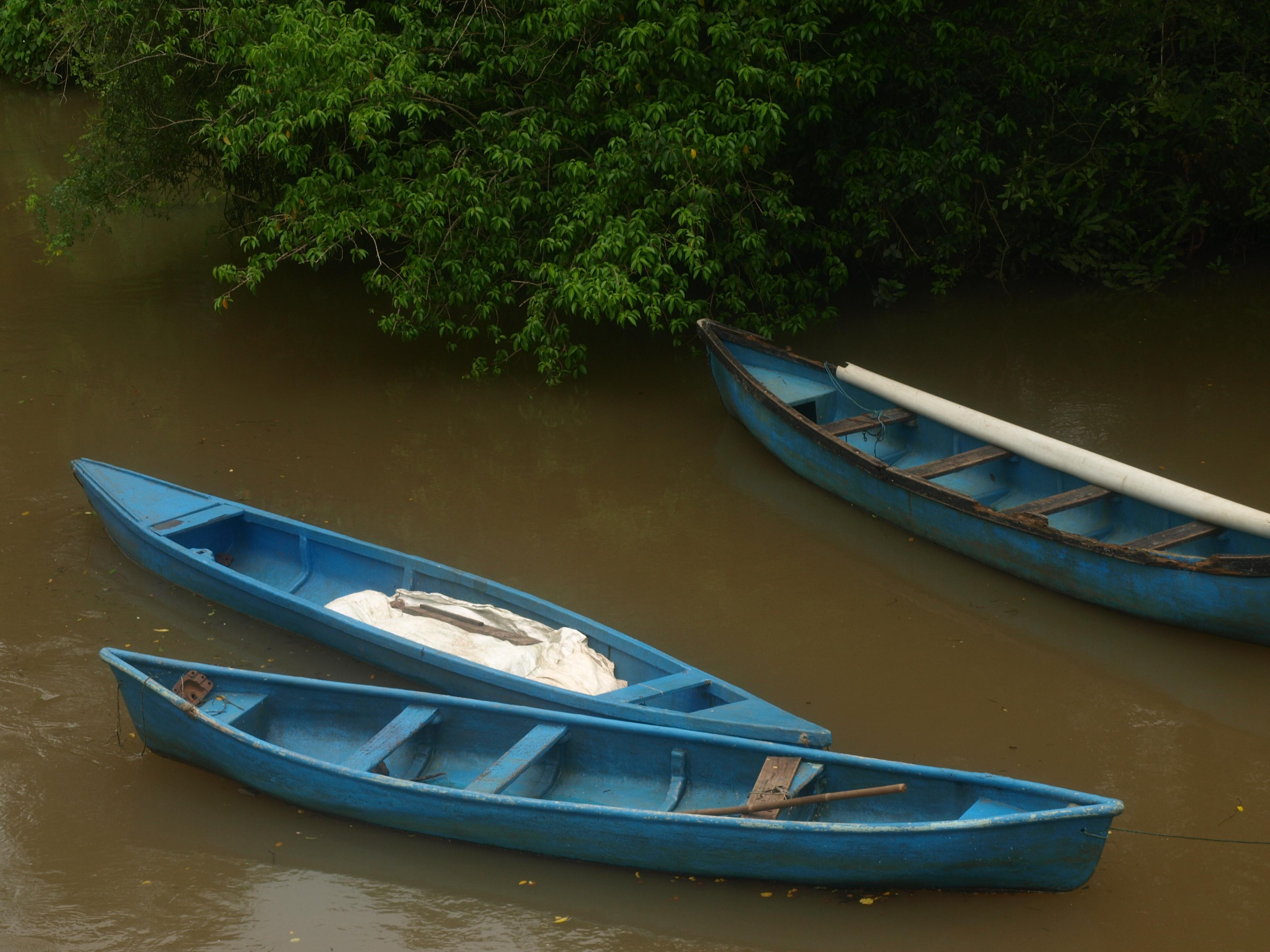
Entry to Moira, a river-surrounded village in Goa

Leroy Veloso, who has studied local genealogy issues, says that there are five vangodd (founding families, or clans) in Moira. According to Veloso, the third vangodd is a composite of families with a number of surnames. They include Jack de Sequeira, and Erasmo Sequeira.

== Notable residents, or people tracing roots to Moira ==
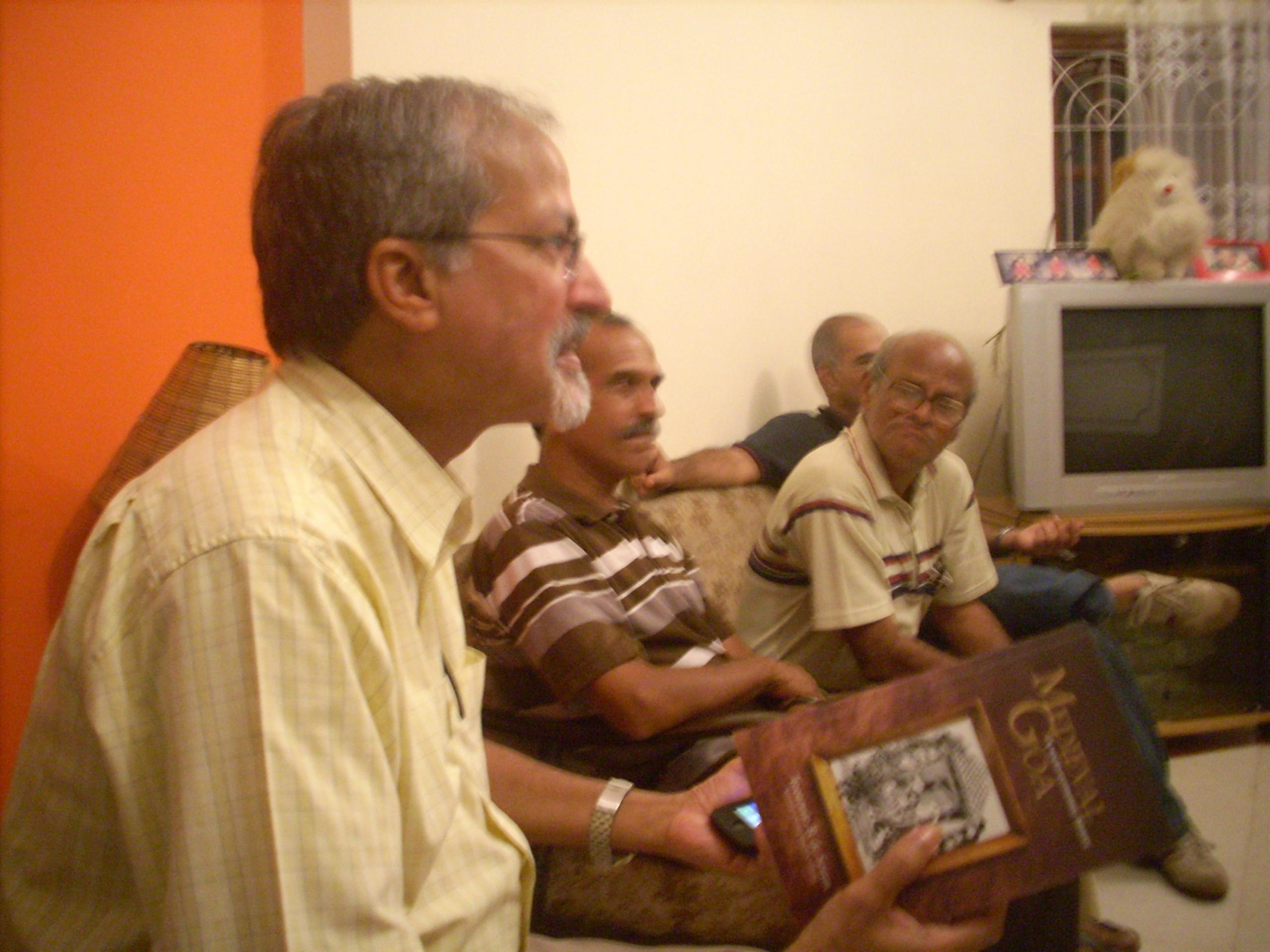
Expats and locals meet up in Moira village, Goa.

- Jack Sequeira – prominent Goa politician and Goa's first Leader of the Opposition
- Erasmo de Sequeira – former Member of Parliament for South Goa
- Teotonio R de Souza – prominent Indo-Portuguese historian, and former Director of the Xavier Centre of Historical Research, Alto-Porvorim, Goa

== Attractions in the locality ==
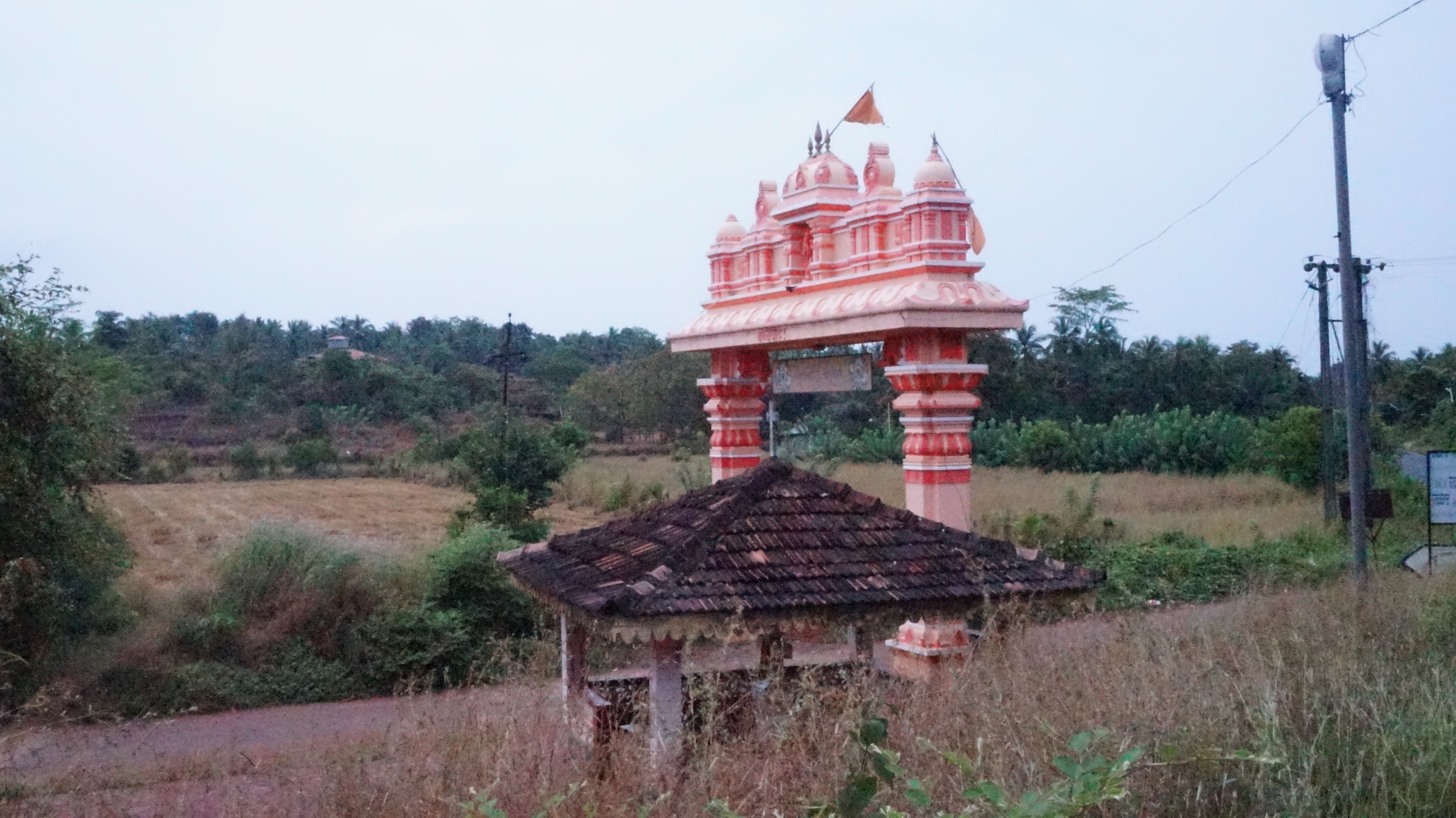
Moira-Nachinola road leading to Aldona

* The backwaters of Moira provide a scenic view

- Assoçiacão Académica de Moira: Sataporio locality's Moira Club was founded in 1920
- Dr Jack de Sequeira's ancestral house: It is located at Bambordem
- Moira bridge: This bridge at Atafondem connects Moira to Bastora and was built in 1978
- Our Lady of Immaculate Conception Church: Built in 1636, it is located between Raim and Calizor. From 1838, it housed a unique bell, which had previously been part of Old Goa's Madre de Deus convent
- St Xavier’s High School: Founded on 5 June 1935 it is run by the Diocesan Society of Education

== See also ==
- Myndoli Banana also known as Moira banana, a variety of banana awarded the Geographical Indication (GI) status tag
