= Myndoli Banana =

Type of banana variety from Goa, India

Myndoli banana (Keli)
- Geographical indication
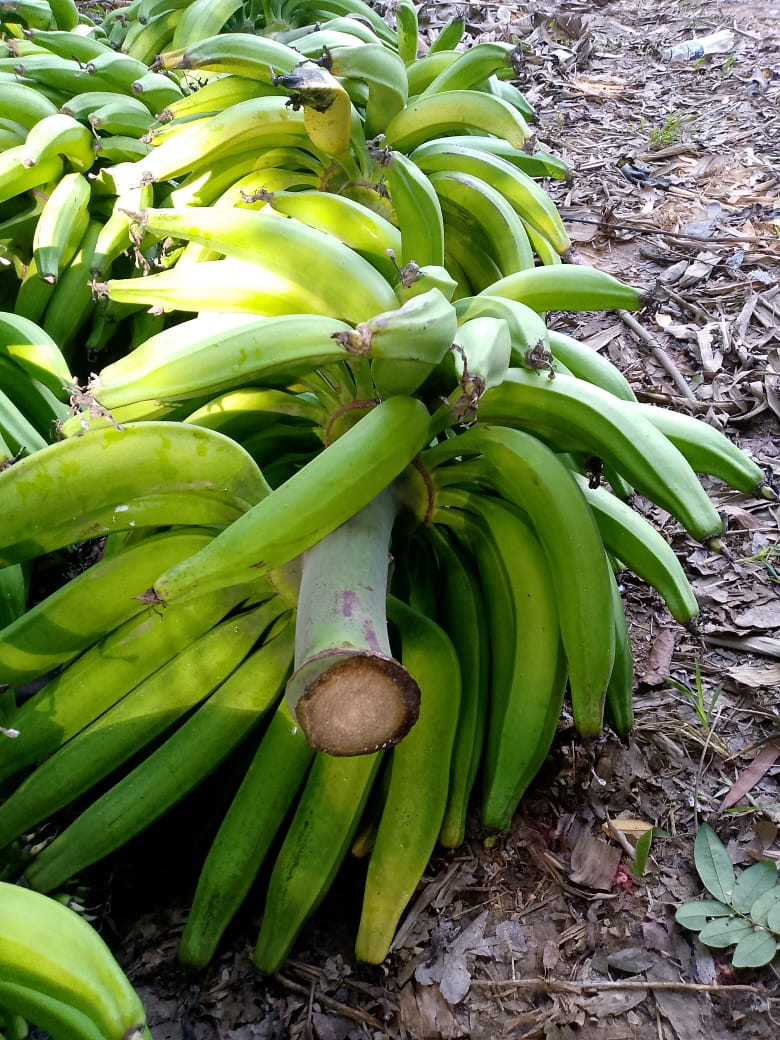
- Alternative names: Mandyolichi Kellim, Myndoli kellim. Moira Banana
- Description: Goa banana is a banana variety cultivated in Goa
- Type: Banana
- Area: Pernem, Bicholim & Bardez talukas of North Goa district
- Country: India
- Registered: 14 September 2021
- Official website: ipindia.gov.in

Myndoli banana is a variety of banana grown in the Indian state of Goa. It is a common and widely cultivated crop in the villages of Pernem, Bicholim, and Bardez Taluka in North Goa district. Myndoli bananas are distinct due to their long, tusk-shaped appearance and larger size, setting them apart from other banana varieties in Goa. Under its Geographical Indication tag, it is referred to as "Myndoli Banana".

== Name ==
The Myndoli banana is believed to be named after the village of Moira in Bardez, where this variety is thought to have originated. The Franciscan priests are believed to have introduced the banana variety to the village of Moira in the 15th century. It is known as various names like Maidya/ Moidya/ Mainoli/ Mandoli/ Myndoli/ Moidechim kelim. The word "Kellim" means banana in Konkani, - the state language of Goa.

== Description ==
Myndoli bananas are distinct due to their long, tusk-shaped appearance and larger size. They are a huge and tall-growing banana plant found in Goa, particularly in Pernem, Bicholim, and Bardez.

The unique soil and climatic conditions in these areas, along the tributaries of the Mapusa and Chapora rivers, support the growth of this heavy feeder variety, imparting a particular taste to the bananas. They are fleshier than other types of bananas grown in Goa. A bunch of Myndoli bananas contains 85-98 bananas, with deep yellow to golden, meaty, and firm flesh. The skin turns from green to golden and develops black spots as it ripens.

Myndoli bananas have several unique characteristics. They have a better taste and fewer seeds, making them widely used in preparing shakes in different variants. They also have a longer shelf life compared to other varieties. Notably, Myndoli bananas are the sweetest, with 30.85% TSS, the highest among all other varieties.

Myndoli bananas are in high demand, especially during festivals like Ganesh Chaturthi, Diwali, and Christmas. Locals have a special attachment to Myndoli bananas, considering them a best gift to relatives and friends during functions and festivals. They are also used to prepare traditional Goan dishes like "Myndolya Kelyacho Halvo" (Banana dessert - Ripe banana slices fried in ghee and cooked in sugar syrup).

== Photo Gallery ==
Actual photos from a Myndoli Banana farmer from Ibrampur.

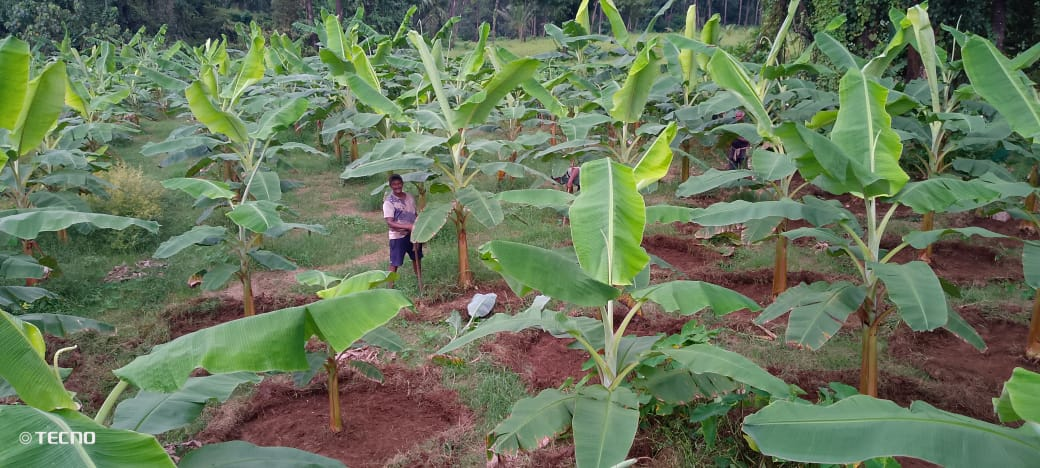
Early Vegetative Stage Myndoli Banana plants 1-2 months

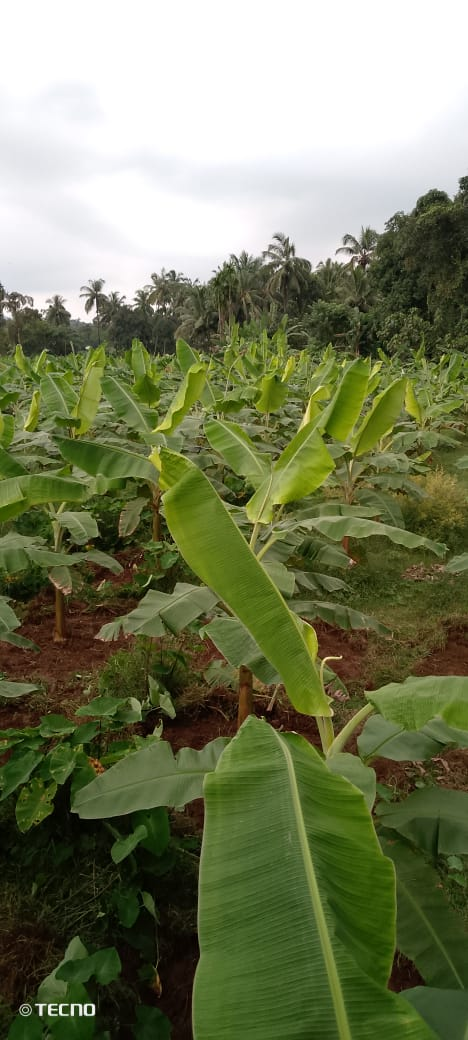
Young Vegetative stage Myndoli Banana plant at 2-3 months

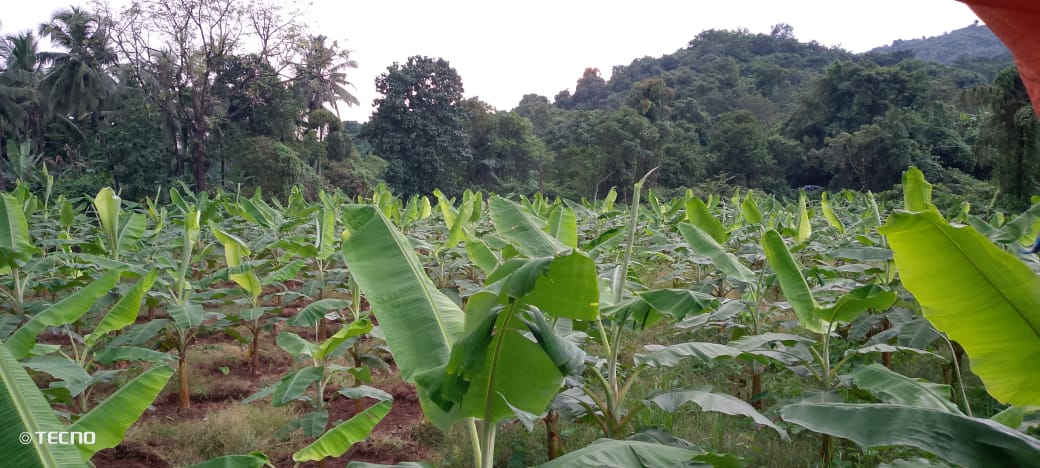
Vegatative stage Myndoli Banana plants at 3-4 months

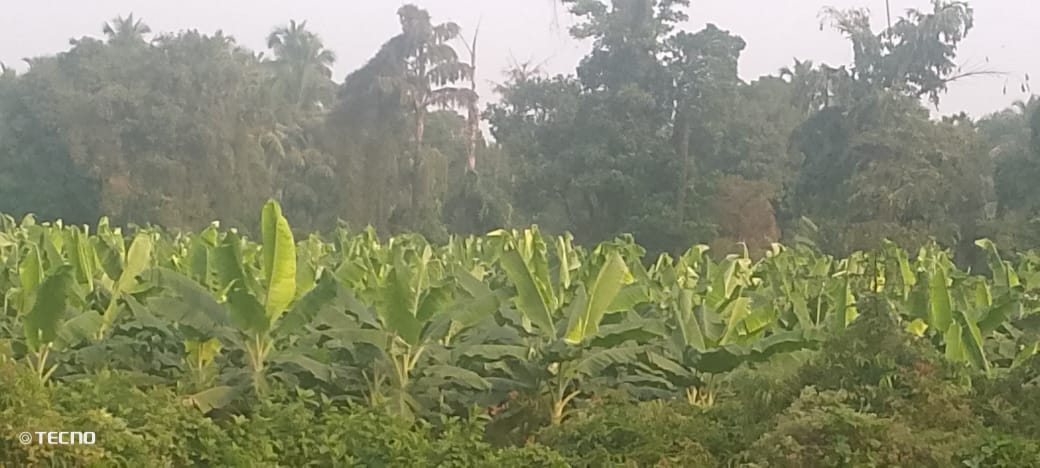
Mid-Vegetative stage Myndoli Banana plants at 5-6 months

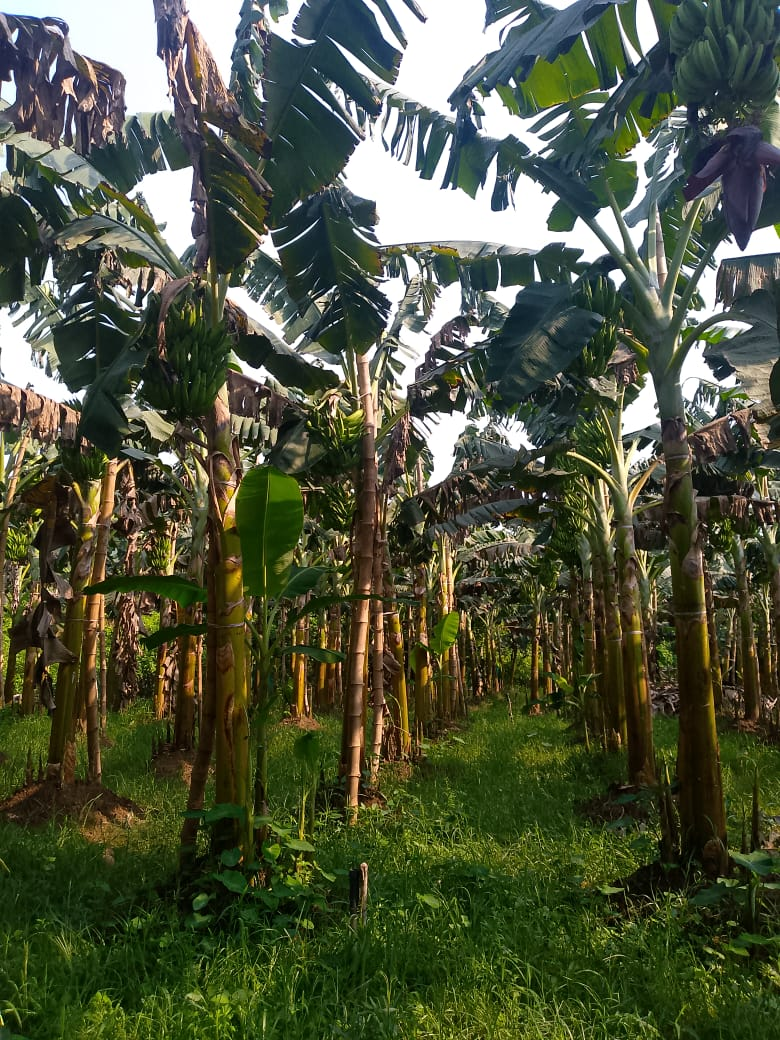
Mature Vegatative Myndoli Banana plants at 8-10 months

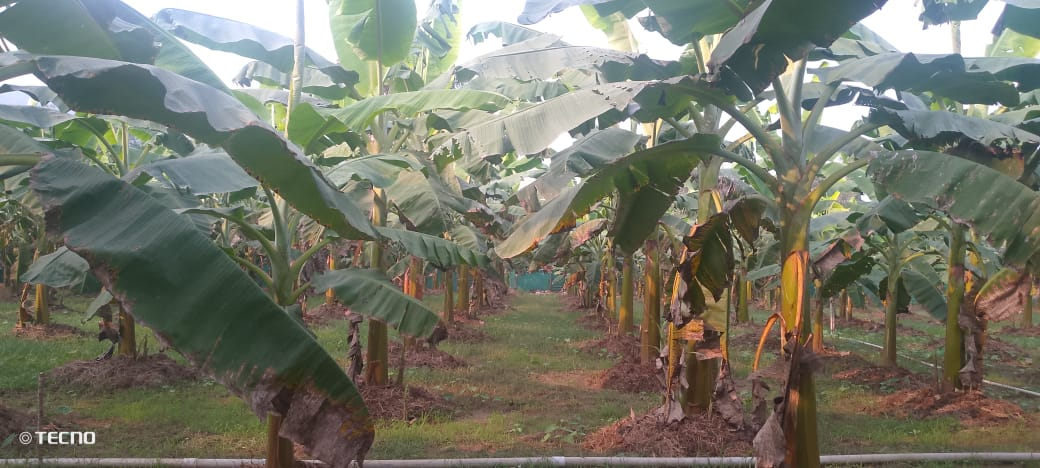
Flowering and fruit-setting phase Myndoli Banana plants

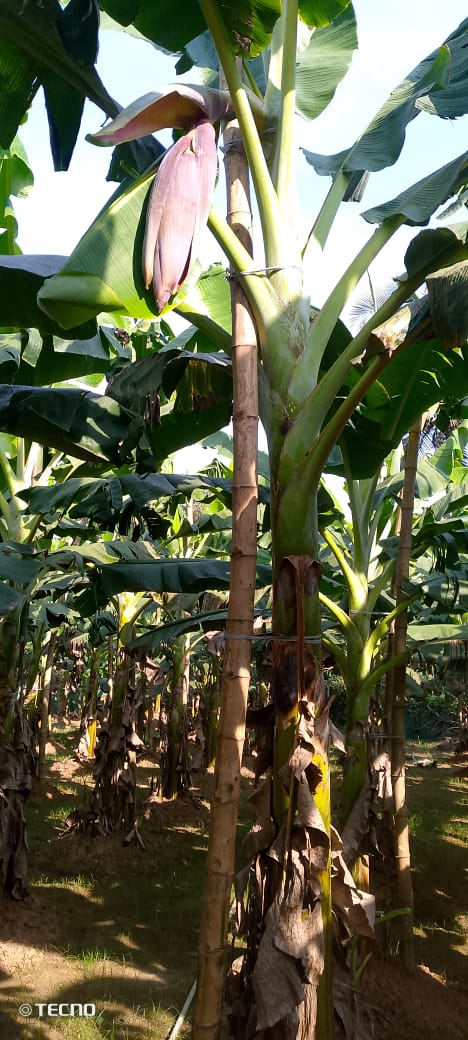
Flowering stage Myndoli Banana plants at 11-13 months

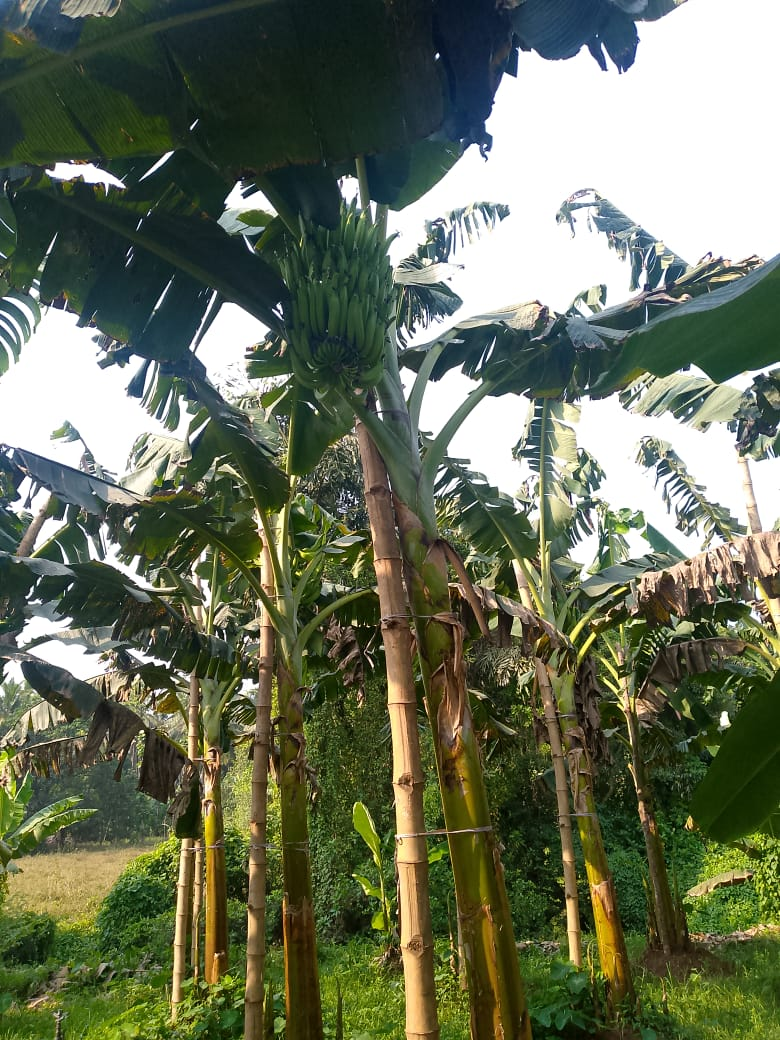
Fruiting stage Myndoli Banana plants at 12-14 months

== Geographical indication ==
It was awarded the Geographical Indication (GI) status tag from the Geographical Indications Registry, under the Union Government of India, on 14 September 2021 and is valid until 12 December 2029.

Myndoli Banana Growers Association (MBGA) from Pernem, proposed the GI registration of Myndoli banana. After filing the application in December 2019, the banana was granted the GI tag in 2021 by the Geographical Indication Registry in Chennai, making the name "Myndoli Banana" exclusive to the bananas grown in the region. It thus became the first banana variety from Goa and the 4th type of goods from Goa to earn the GI tag.

The GI tag protects the banana from illegal selling and marketing, and gives it legal protection and a unique identity.

== See also ==
- Jalgaon banana
