= Goa Opinion Poll Day =

1967 referendum in Goa, Daman and Diu to decide the future of Goa

- 16 January 1967
- Should Goa merge with Maharashtra; and Damaon and Diu with Gujarat, or should they remain as a Union Territory?

Results
Choice	Votes	%
Merge	138,170	44.52%
Remain	172,191	55.48%
Valid votes	310,361	97.71%
Invalid or blank votes	7,272	2.29%
Total votes	317,633	100.00%
Registered voters/turnout	388,392	81.78%

The Goa Opinion Poll Day, also known as Asmitai Dis (transl. Identity Day), was a referendum held in newly annexed union territory of Goa, Daman and Diu in India, on 16 January 1967, to deal with the Konkani language agitation and to decide the future of Goa.

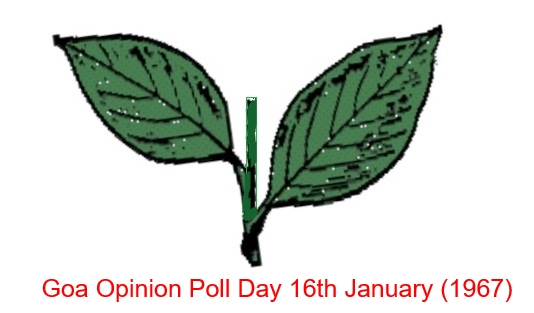
Symbol of Goa Opinion Poll Day (1967)

The referendum, backed by United Goans Party, offered the people of Goa a choice between continuing as a separate territory of India, or merging with the large Marathi speaking state of Maharashtra, the latter being the agenda of the Maharashtrawadi Gomantak Party. It was one of the two referendums held in independent India; the other one was the Sikkim Referendum of 1975. The people of Goa voted against the merger and Goa continued to be a union territory. Subsequently, in 1987, Goa became a full-fledged state within the Indian Union.

== Background ==
British India was partitioned into two countries, the Union of India and Pakistan, which gained independence from the British in August 1947. Goa was the largest part of the Portuguese possessions in India, the other territories being small enclaves. In 1961, India incorporated these territories after the Invasion of Goa and Portugal's other Indian colonies. At the time of Goa's accession into India, Prime Minister Jawaharlal Nehru had promised that it would retain its distinct identity. Even prior to the annexation of Goa, Nehru had promised that the people of Goa would be consulted on any decision about their territory.

In the meantime, the provinces of India had been reorganized on a linguistic basis. This happened due to the intense political movements for language-based states as well as a need to effectively administer a diverse country. Among the prominent movements for linguistic states was the Samyukta Maharashtra movement. In 1960, The state of Bombay was partitioned into two new states: the state of Maharashtra, which encompassed the Marathi speaking areas; and Gujarat, where Gujarati was predominant.

=== The language question ===
One of the main reasons leading to the referendum was the diglossic situation among the people of Goa. Konkani was the main language spoken in Goa. However, many Hindu Goans were bilingual; they spoke both Marathi and Konkani. Among the native Hindu minority in Goa, Marathi occupied a higher status due to the century-long Maratha rule of the Novas Conquistas that preceded Portuguese rule of those areas. Konkani was spoken by Hindus at home and in the bazaars, but religious literature, ceremonies etc. were in Marathi. Some Hindus in Goa believed that Konkani was a dialect of Marathi and hence imagined all Goans to be of Marathi ethnicity. As a result, there were demands from various Hindu sections in Goa as well as from Maharashtra to merge Goa into Maharashtra.

The enclaves of Daman and Diu were Gujarati-speaking areas due to mass immigration of ethnic Hindu Gujaratis following the end of Portuguese rule, and bordered the new state of Gujarat.

== Political situation ==
Since Goa was an overseas territory, it was not given immediate statehood but was incorporated as a Union Territory. Goa did not have its own state legislature, so Velim political leader Roque Santana Fernandes opposed the nomination by Governor and organised a three-day satyagraha for early democracy in Goa. Subsequently, Goa's first polls were held on 9 December 1963, and for this, Roque Santana Fernandes is popularly known as the "Father of Goan Democracy".

The two main parties, UGP and MGP, were formed with two opposing ideologies contest the first election. The Maharashtrawadi Gomantak Party (a Pro-Maharashtra Goan Party) wanted to merge the state of Goa into the newly formed state of Maharashtra. The United Goans Party wanted to retain independent statehood for the former Portuguese enclaves The MGP had the support of the lower castes among Goa's Hindus (who were hoping for land reforms that would allow them to take over the property of their landlords) as well as the Marathi immigrants who had flooded into Goa to take jobs at the MGP's invitation (Portuguese had been replaced by Marathi so that government jobs could be given to immigrants from Maharashtra instead of to native Goans, which led to a population growth of almost 35% that decade). The UGP was dominated by Goan Catholics with support from upper-caste Hindus.

Of the 30 seats in the Goa, Daman and Diu assembly, 28 belonged to Goa, and one each to Daman and Diu. The MGP formed the government, having secured 16 seats strengthening the merger movement while the UGP secured 12 seats and occupied opposition benches. The assembly of Goa, Daman and Diu convened on 9 January 1964.

== Demand for a referendum ==
Prime minister Jawahar Lal Nehru had promised in 1963 that Goa would remain a Union Territory for ten years after which the future of Goa would be decided in accordance with the wishes of the people of Goa. The MGP was not prepared to wait for that long.

The MGP and politicians in Maharashtra were elated at the victory and touted it as a mandate that the majority of Goans were in favour of merger. Dayanand Bandodkar, the leader of MGP and the first Chief Minister of Goa, proclaimed that by voting the MGP into power, the people of Goa had, in effect, voted in favour of merger with Maharashtra. According to them, passing a bill in the state legislature was all that was needed. Passing a bill in the assembly would be easy for the MGP as they had a simple majority.

In a representative democracy like India, the elected representatives take the decisions. It is in very rare conditions that the onus of decision making is put directly on the public.

The United Goans Party, headed by Jack de Sequeira, also knew that if the issue was put to vote in the state assembly, merger was a foregone conclusion. Merging Goa into another state was a monumental decision. Also the very future of the state and the identity of the Goan people was at stake. So they pressed for a people's referendum instead of a vote among the representatives; as was the norm in a Parliamentary democracy like India.

Sequeira visited New Delhi along other MLAs and impressed Nehru about the need of an opinion poll on this matter. However Nehru died before Parliament could take this decision and Lal Bahadur Shastri succeeded him as Prime Minister. A delegation consisting of MGP MLAs and Maharashtra's leaders went to New Delhi to convince him that a vote on the merger should be conducted in the Goa Assembly.

Sequeira, along with his delegation, went to Bangalore where an AICC session was being held and met Shastri. They opposed the move to get the merger voted in the Assembly and impressed on Shastri and Kamraj, the need to put this question before the people of Goa themselves instead of a vote in the Assembly. However Shastri died in 1966 in Tashkent and this decision was now left to the new Prime Minister Indira Gandhi.

Again Sequeira along with other MLAs met Indira Gandhi and submitted a memorandum that such a monumental decision affecting the future of the State could not be left to legislators alone, but should be put before the people to decide. Purushottam Kakodkar, the president of the Goa unit of the Congress Party, used his personal equations with the Nehru family to lobby hard for a referendum with the central leadership. According to one source, he reportedly "almost lost his sanity" trying to do so.

The referendum could be conducted via a signature campaign or by secret ballot. UGP also demanded that expatriate Goans staying in other parts of India or the world, should be allowed to vote by postal ballot. However this request was denied.

The president of India gave his assent to the Goa, Daman and Diu (Opinion Poll) Act on 16 December 1966 after it was passed in both houses of the parliament. 16 January 1967 was chosen as the date for the referendum.

Now that the referendum would be conducted, the anti-merger faction feared that Bandodkar may use the state's administrative and law-enforcement machinery to browbeat the anti-mergerists into submission. The UGP demanded that the MGP government resign so that the referendum could be conducted in a free-and-fair atmosphere. The central government conceded and on 3 December 1966, the MGP government resigned.

== Arguments in favour of merger ==
1. Goa was too small to administer itself and its effective administration would only be possible as a part of a larger state.
2. Similarities between culture and traditions of Hindus in both the states.
3. Strong historical and cultural ties with Maharashtra
4. The belief that Konkani is a dialect of Marathi and that Marathi is the mother tongue of all Goans.

The MGP had the backing of non GSB Hindus (especially Bandodkar's Gomantak Maratha Samaj), immigrants from erstwhile British India, as well as the Maratha landlords from the Novas Conquistas. They were convinced that the only way to overthrow the existing dominance of the Goan Catholic majority and the Gaud Saraswat Brahmins, was to merge into Maharashtra. After merger these previously dominant groups would count for nothing within the vast Maharashtrian populace and their influence would vanish.

The MGP had promised that Goa would be granted several concessions after merger with Maharashtra. The Chief Minister of Maharashtra, Vasantrao Naik, backed up these promises. Some of these promises were:

1. Preferential treatment to Goans in government jobs
2. Industrial and agricultural development
3. Prohibition would not be applicable to Goa
4. Government notices in Goa to be posted in Konkani
5. Creation of a separate university for Goa
6. Development of Konkani language

== Arguments against the merger ==
1. Konkani has been proven from archaeological records to be an independent language. It is not a dialect of Marathi. Konkani was underdeveloped due to the neglect of the language.
2. Konkani would be supplanted by the Marathi majority, and be lost permanently.
3. Goa is a unique Eastern place with a Westernised cultural identity of its own, having been part of the Portuguese East Indies for over 450 years.
4. If Goa was merged, Goan culture would be subsumed in Marathi culture and disappear.
5. Goa would be reduced from a state to a "backwater district of Maharashtra".
6. Prohibition would be imposed in Goa, which had a significant rate of alcohol consumption and brewing industry. It would also affect the toddy tappers (Render caste)
7. Merger would result in a loss of jobs for Goans. The Shiv Sena, a Marathi regionalist party had emerged in Maharashtra in 1966 which favoured an ethnic discrimination policy; demanding preferential treatment for ethnic Marathis in jobs. It also spearheaded violent physical attacks against South Indian immigrants in the city of Mumbai, including Konkani-speaking Hindus from Karwar. If their moves succeeded, Goans would be further sidelined for jobs in their own state.

The Goan Catholics still living in Goa following the end of Portuguese rule numbered around 250,000. They had considerable influence due to their better education and economic prosperity, and were fearful that the merger would lead to their oppression by Hindus (e.g. beef ban, prohibition, etc.). Many Hindus living in Goa at the time, on the other hand, were immigrants from Maharashtra. But the determining question was whether Goa should cease to exist. Unlike the Hindus, for whom Marathi was a medium of religious instruction, the Catholic Goans had never used Marathi. They mostly spoke in Konkani (although the upper class also knew Portuguese, French, English and Latin), and did not have any feelings for Marathi. The pro-merger argument that Konkani was a dialect of Marathi did not please them.

== Buildup to the referendum ==
Campaigning for the referendum began one month before the vote and was vigorous. The pro-merger group received support from leaders of Maharashtra and North India, cutting across political lines.

Sequeira toured extensively over Goa conducting public meetings explaining the anti-merger stand. He also went to many places outside Goa, such as the city of Bombay which had a sizeable Goan community to highlight the issue. However, later it turned out that this was in vain as only Indians residing in Goa were allowed to vote. He was aided in his tasks by his son Erasmo.

The tiatrists of Goa (stage-play performers and writers) campaigned earnestly with Konkani songs written by young writers like Ulhas Buyao, Manoharrai Sardesai, Shankar Bhandari and Uday Bhembre. The pro-merger groups began disrupting Buyao's programmes in their stronghold areas. Buyao's songs Goenchea Mhojea Goenkaramno and Channeache Rati inspired many Goans.

Goa's main Marathi newspaper Gomantak pursued a pro-merger view. To counter this Rashtramat a new Marathi daily, was started to influence the Marathi readers (who were mostly pro-merger) against the merger. Its chief editor was Chandrakant Keni. Uday Bhembre wrote a fiery column Brahmastra, took a stance opposing his pro-merger father. The Rashtramat proved critical in bringing many of the pro-Marathi faction to vote against the merger.

== Referendum ==
The referendum offered the people of Goa, Daman and Diu two options

1. To merge Goa with Maharashtra; and Daman and Diu with Gujarat. Or
2. To remain a Union Territory of India.

The two options were represented by two symbols: A flower for merger, and two leaves for retaining independent identity. Voters had to place a "X" mark against the symbol of choice.

The poll was held on 16 January 1967. Polling was largely peaceful with reports of a few incidents. Supporters from both sides tried their best to ensure that people voted.

=== Results ===
Choice	Votes	%
Merger	138,170	43.50
Union territory	172,191	54.20
Total	317,633	100
Registered voters/turnout	388,432	81.77

There were 388,432 eligible voters. A total of 317,633 votes were polled. Three days were allotted for the counting. 54.20% voted against merger whereas 43.50% voted in favour. Thus, Goans rejected the merger with Maharashtra by a vote of 172,191 to 138,170. The anti-mergerists won by 34,021 votes. In the territorial capital of Panjim, the results were cheered by a crowd of 10,000, who danced in the streets carrying branches symbolic of victory, set off firecrackers, and created such a joyous disturbance that the government had to call in police with tear gas to restore order.

An analysis of the voting patterns shows that the voting patterns closely followed the patterns of the 1963 assembly election. However, a significant section of MGP's supporters had voted against the merger without which the pro-merger faction would have won.

==== Results by constituency ====
No	Constituency	Voters	Polling	Merger	Separate territory
1	Pernem	11516	8741	5967	2304
2	Mandrem	14719	12232	8993	3767
3	Siolim	12909	11681	5583	5868
4	Calangute	14341	13280	8924	8146
5	Aldona	12902	12472	4700	7609
6	Mapusa	12782	11900	5859	5889
7	Tivim	11714	9930	6110	3526
8	Bicholim	11473	10242	7741	2183
9	Pale	12504	9394	6305	3668
10	Sattari	12640	9475	4974	4505
11	Panaji	11137	10502	4175	6245
12	St Cruz	13971	13132	4311	8609
13	St Andre	13708	11803	3930	7590
14	St Estevam	13717	11719	6903	4634
15	Marcaim	10824	10304	8408	3671
16	Ponda	11874	11395	8082	3090
17	Shiroda	12900	10977	6369	4165
18	Sanguem	12639	9525	4560	4500
19	Canacona	13340	10764	5832	4622
20	Quepem	9015	7966	3447	4217
21	Curchorem	12724	12228	5425	6856
22	Cuncolim	12524	11004	1774	9080
23	Benaulim	13661	11485	629	10769
24	Navelim	15757	13575	3061	10355
25	Margao	12603	10503	3241	7157
26	Curtorim	16776	13746	926	12547
27	Cortalim	13587	11962	1376	10411
28	Mormugao	21773	16000	7654	8072
Total		388392	317633	138170	172191
%			81.78	43.5	54.21
Source: The Historic Opinion Poll, Goa News

== Criticism ==
The opinion poll received a great deal of criticism from the anti-mergerists. Their grievance was that the Opinion Poll only offered them status-quo as a self-administering union territory instead of full statehood that they desired. According to them the referendum should not have been on the issue of merger with Goa, but whether Goa should have an independent legislature or not. This issue led to a split in the UGP.

== Subsequent events ==
Despite the MGP's pro-merger move being defeated, it won the subsequent elections again in 1967 and 1972. This was due to mass immigration from Maharashtra into Goa following the Annexation of Goa, leading to a population increase of almost 35% from 1961 to 1970. For the UGP, although the Opinion Poll victory was a vindication of their efforts, it did not translate into electoral gains. Jack de Sequeira was criticized for agreeing to the clause in the referendum that did not confer full statehood to Goa. A group led by Alvaro de Loyola Furtado split from the party. The party later faded away.

=== Statehood ===
Goa did not achieve full statehood in 1971 as was expected. Following persistent demands; including a 1976 resolution by the Goa assembly demanding full statehood; Goa finally became a state on 30 May 1987. Daman and Diu were separated from Goa and continued to be administered as the Union territory of Daman and Diu until 2020. On 26 January 2020, Daman and Diu merged with the Union Territory of Dadra and Nagar Haveli to form the new administrative entity of Dadra and Nagar Haveli and Daman and Diu.

=== The status of Konkani in Goa ===
The status of Konkani as the official state language was closely related to the issue of statehood for Goa. Although the issue of statehood was resolved in 1967, the Konkani Vs Marathi dispute continued because of the continued mass immigration of Marathis into Goa. (The population of Goa increased by another 25% during the 1970s.) In 1975, the Sahitya Akademi recognised Konkani as an independent language.

In 1987, the Goa legislative assembly passed a bill making Konkani the official language of Goa. Although the bill did not explicitly grant Marathi any official status in Goa, it contains safeguards for the use of Marathi in official communication and education.

In 1992, Konkani was included in the Eight Schedule of the constitution of India.

16 January is observed as Asmitai Dis (Identity Day) in Goa.

== See also ==
- History of Goa
- Portuguese India
- Reorganisation of States
- United Goans Party
- Maharashtrawadi Gomantak Party
