= Teotónio de Souza =

Portuguese historian, writer, editor (1947–2019)

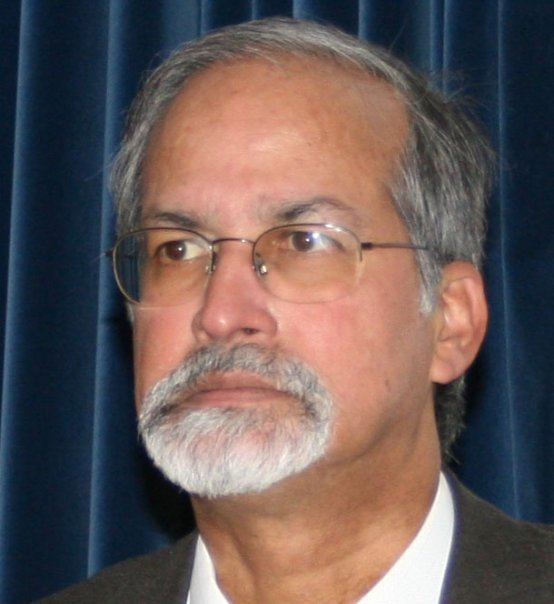
- De Souza in 2009
- Born: Teotónio Rosário de Souza; 18 February 1947; Moirá, Goa, Portuguese India
- Died: 20 February 2019 (aged 72); Lisbon, Portugal
- Education: Jnana-Deepa Vidyapeeth; University of Poona
- Occupation: Historian
- Spouse: Elvira Correia de Souza

Teotónio Rosário de Souza (18 February 1947 – 20 February 2019) was a Portuguese historian and, as a Jesuit, a cofounder and first director of the Xavier Centre of Historical Research (XCHR), at Alto Porvorim, Goa. Based in Portugal since 1995, de Souza was Head and chair, Department of History in the Universidade Lusófona de Humanidades e Tecnologias from 1999 to 2014. He was also a fellow of the Portuguese Academy of History since 1983, and of the Sociedade de Geografia de Lisboa since 2000.

== Early and personal life ==
Of Goan Catholic origin, de Souza was born in the village of Moirá in the Bardes concelho of Portuguese Goa. He belonged to the fifth vangodd (clan) of the village and is the 12th generation descendant of Shantappa Kamat, a Goud Saraswat Brahmin (GSB) who became Diogo de Souza after his conversion to Christianity in 1618.

De Souza was educated mostly in Goa during Portuguese colonial rule. He belonged to the Goan Jesuits for twenty-six years. He left the priesthood in 1995, with dispensation for laicisation from the Holy See so that he could marry a Portuguese woman named Elvira Correia de Souza. He was awarded Portuguese nationality in 1995 and was granted Overseas Citizenship of India (OCI) by the Government of India in 2007. On 20 February 2019, de Souza died in Lisbon.

== Career ==
=== In history ===
In 1979, de Souza wrote his PhD thesis, Medieval Goa: A Socio-Economic History. It challenged the view that Portuguese rule in South Asia resulted in overall prosperity in Goa in the sixteenth and seventeenth centuries. His work claimed that "Golden Goa" was an expression popularised by art historians, with reference to the baroque church architecture of the early centuries of the Portuguese rule.

De Souza was the author and editor of many books and research papers, in both Portuguese and English. His partial memoirs are penned in a book, titled Goa To Me. His favourite area of research includes colonial and post-colonial themes, with particular reference to Portuguese in Asia. His authority in this field has at times been hijacked by people stealing his identity on the Internet. An article entitled "The Goa Inquisition", attributes its authorship to him, on a US-based website called Christianaggression, in 2005. It has since been cited by other communal sites.

On his 60th birthday, de Souza was felicitated with a festschrift titled, Metahistory: History questioning History, containing personal tributes and 43 research papers contributed by historians and social scientists from the world over. The Lusophone University of Lisbon awarded him its Gold Medal of Merit on the same occasion, in recognition of his research, teaching, and critical appreciation and promotion of Lusophony.

A firm believer in the power of web since the early 70s, and a defender of digitalization of historical sources, he founded, in partnership with the Goa-based journalist Frederick Noronha, the Goa-Research-Net in 1997, initially hosted in the Goanet server, and since 2005 on Yahoo! Groups. It also has branches on Facebook and on Mendeley, since May 2017.

Since November 2008, de Souza had continually been a columnist to the Goan daily Herald, in a section which sought to link Goa and Portugal, in the past. Since 2012, he had written Op-ed columns for The Goan Everyday. He also wrote for the Goan Observer and, since April 2018, ran a column for a Portuguese digital newspaper, Pátria . Many of his writings are consulted online at Academia.edu, Scribd, ResearchGate, and the ReCil Lusófona – the online scientific repository of the Universidade Lusófona de Humanidades e Tecnologias, Lisboa.

His book Goa: Outgrowing Postcolonialism – Historical Explorations (1961-2014), is a cultural-historical analysis of the evolution of Goa since its annexation.

=== Academic and research activities ===
De Souza retired from October 2014 as Cathedratic professor of the Universidade Lusófona, after representing, since 1996, the interests of History teaching and research on the Scientific and Pedagogic Councils, of the Faculty of Social and Human Sciences, Education and Administration of the Universidade Lusófona, as an ex-officio member. While acting as coordinator / Director of the MA and M.Phil. courses in History, he guided M.Phil. and PhD researchers in Political Science and Diplomatic Relations and directed a line of research related to "Colonial and Post-Colonial Societies", and Memories of CPES (Centro de Pesquisa e Estudos Sociais) of the Faculty of Social and Human Sciences, Universidade Lusófona, Lisboa.

He was Director-Editor of the Journal of ACSEL (Associação dos Cientistas Sociais do Espaço Lusófono) and continued to help as Chief-Editor of the Journal FLUXOS E RISCOS – Revista de Estudos Sociais, that published the research findings of CPES (Centre for Social Research and Studies). He was also a member of the editorial board of the Journal of Immigrant & Refugee Studies.
