= Roy de Souza =

Kenyan-born entrepreneur and writer (born 1970)

- Born: 1970 (age 55–56); Nairobi, Kenya
- Education: University of Oxford (M.S. in Engineering); Kellogg Business School (M.B.A.)
- Occupations: Entrepreneur; writer
- Known for: Cancer research (AI Drug Discovery Per Patient)
- Spouse: Aisha de Sequeira (m. 2008; died 2020)
- Children: 3
- Father: Fitz de Souza
- Relatives: Erasmo de Sequeira (father-in-law); Jack de Sequeira (grandfather-in-law)

Roy de Souza (born 1970) is a Kenyan-born tech entrepreneur and writer. He is the co-founder of technology company ZEDO and medical technology company BreakBio. In 2022, he was a TEDx speaker. In May 2023, he and his wife Aisha de Sequeira were honored by the American Cancer Society for de Souza's work in personalized medicine.

== Education ==
De Souza earned a master's degree in engineering from the University of Oxford and an MBA from Kellogg Business School.

== Career ==
De Souza served as a strategy consultant at the COBA Group, a strategy consulting boutique based in the UK. He also worked in product management for the Elon Musk-founded web software company Zip2.

De Souza founded technology company ZEDO in 1999. In 2006, he founded the company Zebo, an offshoot of ZEDO focused on allowing users to catalog personal possessions and shop for similar items. De Souza launched online ad exchange ZINC India in 2011, which was originally ZEDO's ad exchange platform in India before becoming a separate company. He served as the ZEDO's CEO and oversaw the company as it transitioned into a subsidiary of Discovery following its acquisition by Discovery, Inc. in 2021.

In 2022, de Souza was a TEDx speaker, talking about vaccines to prevent cancer.

== Cancer research ==
After his wife, Aisha de Sequeira's cancer diagnosis, de Souza became involved in vaccine research to develop a personalized vaccine for her cancer. De Souza went on to co-found medical technology company BreakBio, basing the company in Boston, Massachusetts. BreakBio develops personalized vaccines and AI software that aids cancer treatments by identifying that difference between normal cells and cancer cells. De Souza and Devabhaktuni Srikrishna also co-authored the book Cancer: What a Personal Crisis Taught Us About How T-Cells Can Save Your Life.

== Bibliography ==
- De Souza, R. & Srikrishna, D. (2019). Cancer: What a personal crisis taught us about how T-cells can save your life. BreakBio Corp. ISBN 978-0578548777
