= Zedo =

Ad Company

Zedo, Inc.
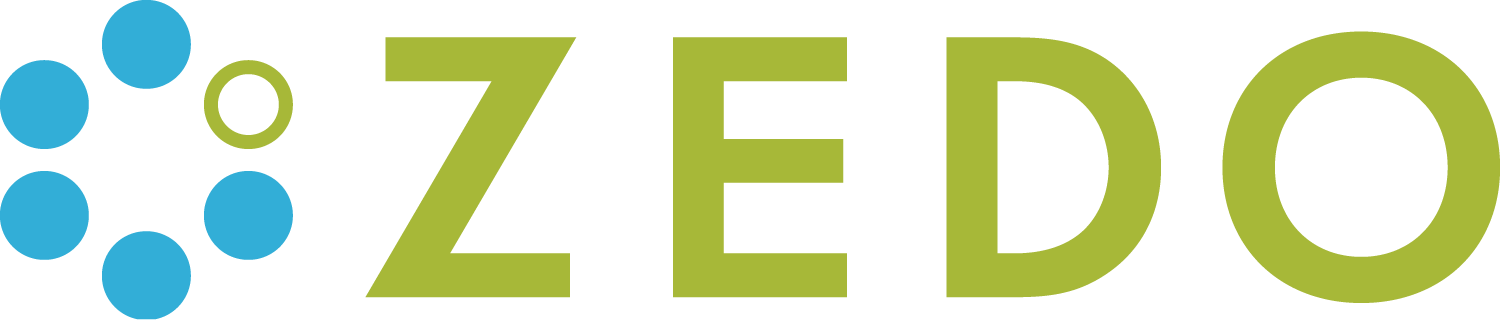
- Type: Private
- Industry: Online Advertising Technology
- Founded: September 1999
- Headquarters: San Francisco, California, USA
- Key people: Roy de Souza, Co-Founder/CEO; Paul Prior, President; (the late) Joseph Jacob, CTO; Summer Koide, VP Products and Services;
- Products: ZINC premium network (for Advertisers), Zedo Ad Server (for Publishers, Advertisers, Networks); Network Optimization (for Publishers); Behavioral Targeting (for Networks)
- Owner: Warner Bros. Discovery India
- Parent: Independent (1999–2021); Discovery, Inc. (2021–2022); Warner Bros. Discovery (since 2022)
- Website: www.zedo.com

Zedo (trademark styled as ZEDO) is a US and India-based advertising technology company that provides several online advertising products and services to Internet publishers, advertisers, and agencies. The company was founded in 1999 by Roy de Souza.

The company works with publishers that sell space on their web pages to online advertisers. Zedo's servers send advertisements to users' browsers. Zedo uses an HTTP cookie to track users' browsing history resulting in targeted pop-up ads and pop-under ads. The cookie is often flagged by spyware and adware removal programs. In a 2013 case study written by Amazon, Amazon described ZEDO as a company that "develops innovative technology solutions to help publishers sell and deliver Internet ads".

In December 2021, Zedo was acquired by Discovery, Inc.

== History ==
Zedo was founded in September 1999 by Roy de Souza. The company is headquartered in the North Beach district of San Francisco, California, and has four research and development centers in Russia and India. In 2001, it expanded by offering the ad-serving technology to large websites.

By 2004, the use of filters to limit pop-ups and pop-unders increased, and Zedo began using intromercials—advertisements served before the requested content—as an alternate method.

Zedo has also experimented with creating its own social networking sites. In 2006, the company launched Zebo.com, a social networking site, where users get shopping advice from friends who own products.

In 2011, Zedo began partnering with newspaper publishers.

In October 2011, Zedo spun out its ad exchange platform in India into a separate company called Zinc with headquarters in Mumbai.

=== Acquisition by Discovery ===
On December 8, 2021, it was announced that Discovery had acquired Zedo, its real-time bidding and supply-side platforms to sell advertising programmatically. Zedo employees joined Discovery as part of the acquisition deal.

== Criticism ==
Zedo uses HTTP cookies to track users' browsing and advertisement viewing history. A writer for The Independent called pop-unders from Zedo and other providers "annoying" while also describing the advertisements' windows as a "seemingly endless barrage". Technologist Danny Sullivan has stated that Zedo carries misleading "junk" ads linking to fake news sites.

Zedo offers an option to opt out of targeted advertisements and says that it has an anti-spyware policy.
