= United Goans Party =

Former political party in Goa, India

- Abbreviation: UGP
- Founder: Jack de Sequeira
- Founded: September 1963
- Merged into: Indian National Congress

The United Goans Party (UGP) is a political party in state of Goa. It was formed in 1963 in the former union territory of Goa, Daman and Diu, with Jack de Sequeira as its party leader, when multiple regional parties merged during the Konkani language agitation.

== Formation ==
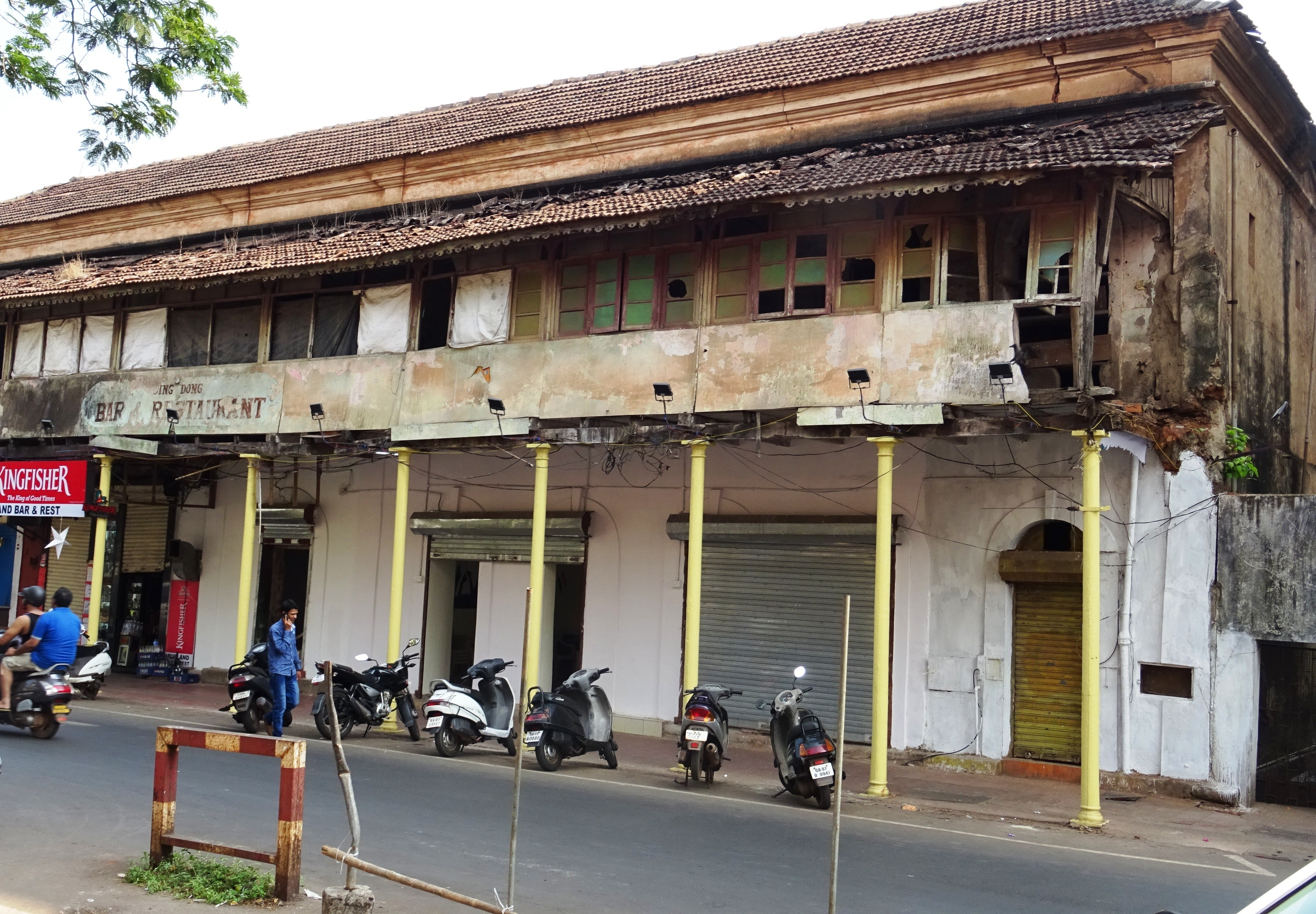
United Goans Party office

After Goa's accession into the Indian union in 1961, Goa became a union territory with its own legislature. Elections to the state assembly were scheduled to be held in 1963. There were calls from many sections in Goa and the neighbouring state of Maharashtra to merge the tiny state into Maharashtra. This demand was spearheaded by the Maharashtrawadi Gomantak Party.

Sensing that the merger would mean the gradual disappearance of Goa's distinct identity and culture, four parties merged to form the United Goans Party in September 1963. The four parties were the Partido Indiano, Goan National Union, United Front of Goans and Goancho Paksh. Its first president was Jack de Sequeira. The United Goans Party was formed by merging Goencho Pokx of Jack Sequeira, the Partido Indiano of Alvaro de Loyola Furtado, the Goa National union of J M Desouza and United Fronts of Goans and Democratic Party who shared a common goal, that of separate identity for Goa, and which was against the merger of Goa with Maharashtra. The think tank for the United Goans Party came from its second in command, Loyola Furtado, who many consider as the brains behind the United Goans Party. The main support base for the UGP came from the Catholics of Goa and upper-caste Hindus. Although it was predominantly Christian it did not exclude other groups and also put up Hindu and Muslim candidates.

== Performance in elections ==
In the first elections held in 1963, the MGP secured 16 from a total of 30. UGP put up candidates in 24 constituencies and secured 12 and formed the opposition. Two seats, one from Daman and Diu each went to independent candidates. De Sequeira became the leader of the Opposition. Its main manifesto item was "Separate Statehood in and outside the Assembly of the Union Territory of Goa, Daman and Diu and in Parliament". Among its key promises were the setting up of a University, industrialization, land reforms and the recognition of Konkani as the regional language.

The Church supported the Catholic-dominated UGP against the Communist-led Frente Popular.

== Role in the Goa Opinion Poll ==
Following MGPs victory in the first election, the MGP demanded that Goa be merged into Maharashtra. The MGP wanted that the issue should be voted in the Goa legislature, as was the norm in a representative democracy. The UGP was of the opinion that such an important decision should not be left to them MLAs but should be put before the people of Goa to decide. If the merger was to be voted in the Goa legislature, it was a foregone conclusion that the MGP with its majority would push through the merger.

The UGP MLAs visited New Delhi several times to convince them to hold a referendum in Goa. First they met Jawaharlal Nehru; and after his death, met Lal Bahadur Shastri to press for a referendum.

However Shastri died in 1966 in Tashkent and this decision was now left to the new prime minister Indira Gandhi. The UGP delegation met her and submitted a memorandum that such a monumental decision affecting the future of the State could not be left to legislators alone, but should be put before the people to decide. Finally the central government agreed to hold a referendum in Goa.

The UGP demanded that all people from Goa, regardless of where they were staying in India, should be allowed to vote. Those staying outside Goa could vote by postal ballot. However this request was denied. They also demanded that all deputationinsts from Maharashtra should not be allowed to vote and that the Bandodkar ministry should resign to conduct a free and fair poll. The centre conceded the demand for Bandodkar's resignation.

The opinion poll was held on 16 January 1967. A total of 3,17,633 votes were polled. The merger was defeated by 34,021 votes.

== First split ==
A section of UGP MLAs were unhappy with the very idea of an Opinion Poll. A splinter group of four MLAs headed by Dr. Alvaro De Loyala Furtado came to be known as United Goans (Furtado Group). The main body of the party was known as United Goans (Sequeira Group). The U.G.(F) received recognition from the Election Commission and used The Rising Sun as its symbol. The Furtado Group received the support from Goa Organised Alliance and fielded eight candidates in the next election. The Sequeira Group used The Hand as a symbol. The symbol was associated with St. Francis Xavier. It contested all thirty seats this time, claiming primary responsibility for the Opinion Poll and its verdict and promised a separate Konkani State of Goa.

== Second split ==
In 1977, Erasmo de Sequeira joined hands with the Bharatiya Lok Dal, headed by Charan Singh. He did this without consulting his party members. The party members were enraged, causing the UGP(Sequeira group) to split into two groups: UGP (Sequeria Group) and UGP (Naik Group). He lost the next parliamentary election to Eduardo Faleiro of UGP-N in March 1977. In the next Assembly elections, UGP-S managed to win just three seats as compared to UGP-N, which won 10 seats.

== Decline ==
The UGP had never won an election. It split, first in 1967 and the second time in 1977. Its decline (1977–1989) corresponded with the rise of the Congress, a national party which did not win any seat in the first elections. Finally it merged with the Congress.

== See also ==
- Goa Opinion Poll
- Dr. Jack de Sequeira
- Erasmo de Sequeira
- Dr. Alvaro De Loyala Furtado
- Atanasio Monserrate
- United Goans Democratic Party
- Maharashtrawadi Gomantak Party
