= Corporation of the City of Panaji =

Administrative governing body for the city of Panaji

Type
- Type: Municipal Corporation

History
- Founded: March 22, 1843; 183 years ago (Portuguese Royal Decree); January 23, 2003; 23 years ago (Municipal Corporation status)

Leadership
- Mayor: Rohit Monserrate
- Deputy Mayor: Vasant Ashok Agshikar
- Municipal Commissioner: Clen Madeira

Structure
- Seats: 30
- Length of term: 5 years

Elections
- Voting system: First-past-the-post
- Last election: 2026
- Next election: 2031

Website
- ccpgoa.com

The Corporation of the City of Panaji (CCP) is responsible for the civic administration of Panaji (Panjim), the capital city of Goa, India. It is the oldest civic institution in Asia and is the world's smallest municipal corporation.

According to Census of India 2011, the area under the municipal body is 53.7 km^{2} and the population is 70,991. It has 17,807 households and the population of Scheduled Castes is 1,701 and Scheduled Tribes is 4,586.

== History ==
On 22 March 1843, by royal Portuguese decree, Pangim was elevated to the status of a city and became the capital of Portuguese India and was renamed Nova Goa. The erstwhile capital was Velha Goa. In 1858, a loan was sanctioned and the municipality began the construction of Pangim's Pacos Municipais (municipality palace). In December 1969, Panjim became part of the Republic of India after the Indian annexation, known as the Liberation of Goa. On 19 December 1961, the Indian army with Operation Vijay resulted in the annexation of Goa, Daman and Diu into the Indian union. After annexation, Panjim served as the capital of the Union Territory of Goa, Daman & Diu until statehood in 1987.

In 2002, the Goa Legislative Assembly enacted the City of Panaji Corporation Act, 2002. The Act provides for constituting a Municipal Corporation for Panaji (the Act appears in the Government Gazette — it is dated/published in the Official Gazette, 23 January 2003).

== Wards ==
Corporation of the City of Panaji: Ward Geographic Profiles
Ward Number	Zone	Ward Name / Category	Areas Covered	Assembly Constituency
1	Zone 1	General	Caranzalem (Dona Paula side), Cabo Raj Bhavan area	Panaji
2	Zone 1	OBC Women	Caranzalem Central, Kerant	Panaji
3	Zone 1	OBC Women	Caranzalem East, Camotim Vaddo	Panaji
4	Zone 1	General	Caranzalem Beach Road, Machado Cove	Panaji
5	Zone 1	General	Tonca North, Caranzalem	Panaji
6	Zone 1	OBC	Tonca South, Miramar Coastal Area	Panaji
7	Zone 1	General	Miramar Beach Area, Dempo House Road	Panaji
8	Zone 1	OBC Women	Tonca Central, Behind Hotel Goa International	Panaji
9	Zone 2	General	Panaji City Centre, Navhind Bhavan Area	Panaji
10	Zone 2	General	St. Inez Coastal, Miramar Junction	Panaji
11	Zone 2	General	St. Inez Central, Pharmacy College Area	Panaji
12	Zone 2	OBC Women	St. Inez South, Kamat Classic Area	Taleigao
13	Zone 2	General	Panaji Market, Market Sub-lanes	Taleigao
14	Zone 2	General	Boca de Vaca, Central St. Inez North	Taleigao
15	Zone 2	Women	Altinho West, Circuit House Quarter Lanes	Taleigao
16	Zone 3	General	Altinho East, All India Radio Colony	Taleigao
17	Zone 3	General	Fontainhas Mala North, Heritage Precinct	Taleigao
18	Zone 3	Women	Mala Central, Spring Area Lanes	Taleigao
19	Zone 3	General	Mala South, Neugi Nagar Commercial	Taleigao
20	Zone 3	General	Bhatti, Fontainhas Core Area	Taleigao
21	Zone 3	Women	Portais, Patto Colony Outskirts	Taleigao
22	Zone 3	OBC	Patto Plaza, Central Business District	Taleigao
23	Zone 4	General	Ribandar Khazan, Coastal Highway East	Panaji
24	Zone 4	General	Ribandar Central, Holy Family Church Area	Panaji
25	Zone 4	Women	Ribandar Patto, Ferry Wharf Line	Panaji
26	Zone 4	General	Ribandar São Pedro, Historical Ward	Panaji
27	Zone 4	Women	Ribandar Chimbel Border, Low Income Housing Lane	Panaji
28	Zone 4	General	Ribandar Fondvem, Marshy Zone Subdivisions	Panaji
29	Zone 4	General	Ribandar Goa Velha Junction Borders	Panaji
30	Zone 4	ST Women	Ribandar Outer Boundaries, Bainguinim Border	Panaji

== Councilors ==
Elections to the Corporation of the city of Panaji were held in 2026. The ruling panel backed by the Bharatiya Janata Party (BJP) won 27 out of 30 corporate seats. The remaining 3 seats were won by candidates of the independent "Ami Panjekar" panel.

List of Elected Councillors (2026 March)
Ward Number	Councillor	Political Group / Panel
1	Cabral Nelson Francisco	Babush-BJP Panel
2	Fernandes Yuvraj Francis	Babush-BJP Panel
3	Monserrate Rohit Joe	Babush-BJP Panel
4	Po Carolina	Babush-BJP Panel
5	Shirgaonkar Shubhada Rupesh	Babush-BJP Panel
6	Furtado Surendra Cristovam	Ami Panjekar Panel (Independent)
7	Lorena Bento Silvester	Babush-BJP Panel
8	Andrade Joel Savio	Babush-BJP Panel
9	Furtado Ruth Surendra	Ami Panjekar Panel (Independent)
10	Amonkar Prasad Prakash	Babush-BJP Panel
11	Parekh Karan Yatin	Babush-BJP Panel
12	Shetye Varsha Hari	Babush-BJP Panel
13	Mainkar Pramay Prakash	Babush-BJP Panel
14	Madkaikar Uday Vaman	Babush-BJP Panel
15	Chopdekar Shayani Sharad	Babush-BJP Panel
16	Kerkar Asmita Sandesh	Babush-BJP Panel
17	Jorge Dennis Edward Francis	Babush-BJP Panel
18	Chopdekar Aditi	Babush-BJP Panel
19	Morajkar Narsinvha Chandrakant	Babush-BJP Panel
20	Chodankar Shubham Gopal	Babush-BJP Panel
21	Manerkar Manisha Bhavanidas	Babush-BJP Panel
22	Mainkar Diksha Devanand	Babush-BJP Panel
23	Surlikar Santosh Dhananjay	Babush-BJP Panel
24	Naik Pranjal Prajit	Babush-BJP Panel
25	Naik Sanjeev Shamsunder	Babush-BJP Panel
26	Agshikar Vasant Ashok	Babush-BJP Panel
27	Dias Lorraine Sueellen	Babush-BJP Panel
28	Chopdekar Vithal Dayanand	Babush-BJP Panel
29	Fernandes Silvestre	Babush-BJP Panel
30	Da Cunha Sandra Maria	Ami Panjekar Panel (Independent)

== Revenue sources ==
The following are the income sources for the corporation from the Central and State Government.

=== Revenue from taxes ===
Following is the Tax related revenue for the corporation.

- Property tax.
- Profession tax.
- Entertainment tax.
- Grants from Central and State Government like Goods and Services Tax.
- Advertisement tax.

=== Revenue from non-tax sources ===
Following is the Non Tax related revenue for the corporation.

- Water usage charges.
- Fees from Documentation services.
- Rent received from municipal property.
- Funds from municipal bonds.

== Elections ==
2026 Corporation of the City of Panaji election
- 11 March 2026
- Turnout: 71.30%
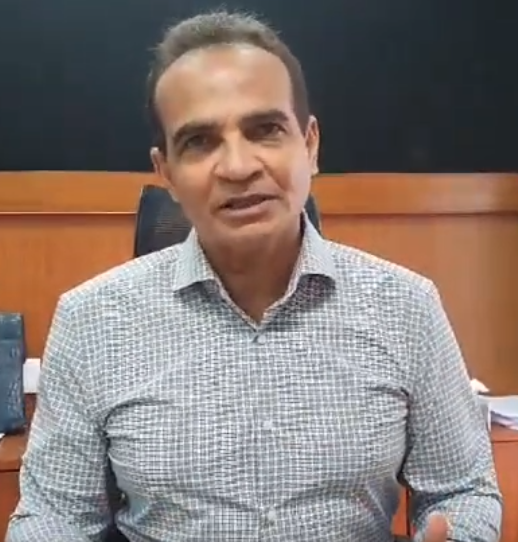

Party	BJP	[[Independent (Note: Led the independent "Ami Panjekar" opposition coalition panel against the ruling BJP faction.)|Independent (Note: Led the independent "Ami Panjekar" opposition coalition panel against the ruling BJP faction.)]]
Mayor before election
Rohit Joe Monserrate
BJP
Elected mayor
Rohit Joe Monserrate
BJP

2026 Corporation of the City of Panaji elections were held in the capital city of Goa on 11 March 2026 to elect 30 members of the Corporation of the City of Panaji. The votes were counted and results were declared on 13 March 2026.

The ruling panel backed by the Bharatiya Janata Party (BJP), orchestrated by local heavyweight Atanasio "Babush" Monserrate, won a landslide victory by capturing 27 seats out of 30, securing a supermajority. The main opposition panel "Ami Panjekar", spearheaded by Utpal Parrikar, won the remaining 3 seats. Following the formation of the council, Rohit Joe Monserrate was re-elected as the Mayor of Panaji, while Vasant Ashok Agshikar was appointed Deputy Mayor.
