= List of constituencies of the Goa Legislative Assembly =

Goa Legislative Assembly
- 8th Goa Assembly

Type
- Type: Unicameral
- Term limits: 5 years
- Seats: 40

Elections
- Voting system: First past the post
- Last election: 2022

Meeting place
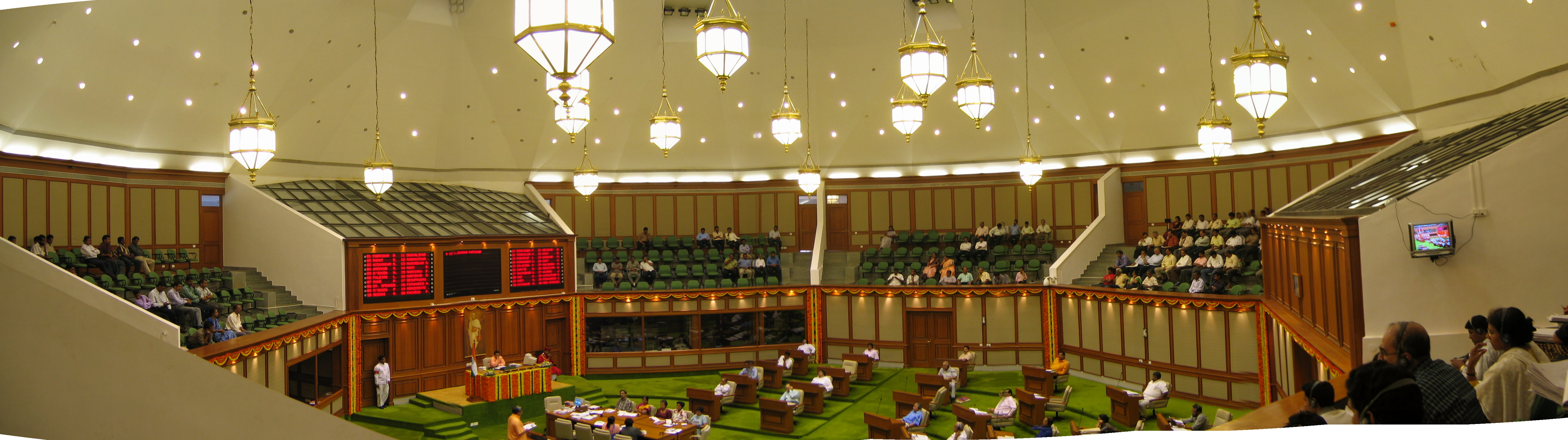
- Goa State Legislative Assembly Complex, Porvorim, Bardez, Goa, India

Website
- www.goavidhansabha.gov.in

Location of Goa (circled in red) within India

The Goa Legislative Assembly is the unicameral legislature of the state of Goa on the west coast of India. Its seat is at Porvorim, and it sits for a term of five years unless it is dissolved early. Goa is India's smallest state by area and fourth-smallest by population. The Goa Legislative Assembly has existed since 1963. As of the 2022 election, it comprises 40 constituencies.

The Constitution of India lays down the general principles of positive discrimination for the Scheduled Castes (SC) and Scheduled Tribes (ST). Since the transition of India from a United Kingdom dominion to an independent republic in 1950, the SCs and STs have been given reservation status—guaranteeing political representation—and after Goa was annexed from Portugal in 1961, the same principles applied to it as well. The 2011 census of India found that, within Goa, the population of the Scheduled Castes was 1.74% of the total. Accordingly, one constituency (Pernem) in the assembly is reserved for candidates of the Scheduled Castes.

The population of the ST community in Goa was only 566 in the 2001 census which is why no seats were reserved for them during the 2002 delimitation. Three communities (Kunbi, Gawda, and Velip) were added to the ST list in 2003, which brought the ST population to 149,275 (around 10% of the state's total) in the 2011 census. A bill was passed in the Lok Sabha, the lower house of the Parliament of India, in 2025 to ensure that a requisite number of seats are reserved in Goa's assembly (from the next election) to reflect this change.

== History ==
Changes in the constituencies of the Goa Legislative Assembly over time
Year	Act/Order	Explanation	Total seats	SC-reserved seats	Election(s)
1961	Annexation of Goa	Goa was annexed from the Portuguese in 1961 and the union territory of Goa, Daman and Diu was formed.	30	0	1963, 1967, 1972
1976	Delimitation of Parliamentary and Assembly Constituencies Order, 1976	One seat was reserved for members of the Scheduled Castes.	30	1	1977, 1980, 1984
1987	The Constitution (Fifty-sixth Amendment) Act, 1987	The union territory was split, and Goa was made India's twenty-fifth state The number of constituencies was increased to 40.	40	1	1989, 1994, 1999, 2002, 2007
2008	Delimitation Commission Order, 2007	There were no changes to the number of reserved seats.	40	1	2012, 2017, 2022

== Constituencies ==
The constituencies of Goa with their reservation status indicated by colour

Reservation
Scheduled Castes (SC)

Constituencies of the Goa Legislative Assembly
No.	Name	Reserved for (SC/None)	District	Lok Sabha constituency	Electorate (2022)
1	Mandrem	None	North Goa	North Goa	32,732
2	Pernem	SC	North Goa	North Goa	33,212
3	Bicholim	None	North Goa	North Goa	28,231
4	Tivim	None	North Goa	North Goa	29,132
5	Mapusa	None	North Goa	North Goa	29,294
6	Siolim	None	North Goa	North Goa	29,661
7	Saligao	None	North Goa	North Goa	27,576
8	Calangute	None	North Goa	North Goa	25,632
9	Porvorim	None	North Goa	North Goa	27,097
10	Aldona	None	North Goa	North Goa	28,994
11	Panaji	None	North Goa	North Goa	22,408
12	Taleigao	None	North Goa	North Goa	30,023
13	Santa Cruz	None	North Goa	North Goa	29,298
14	St. Andre	None	North Goa	North Goa	21,428
15	Cumbarjua	None	North Goa	North Goa	26,601
16	Maem	None	North Goa	North Goa	28,919
17	Sanquelim	None	North Goa	North Goa	27,919
18	Poriem	None	North Goa	North Goa	32,985
19	Valpoi	None	North Goa	North Goa	31,958
20	Priol	None	North Goa	North Goa	31,017
21	Ponda	None	North Goa	South Goa	32,160
22	Siroda	None	North Goa	South Goa	29,678
23	Marcaim	None	North Goa	South Goa	28,275
24	Mormugao	None	South Goa	South Goa	20,418
25	Vasco Da Gama	None	South Goa	South Goa	35,613
26	Dabolim	None	South Goa	South Goa	24,661
27	Cortalim	None	South Goa	South Goa	30,782
28	Nuvem	None	South Goa	South Goa	28,427
29	Curtorim	None	South Goa	South Goa	29,850
30	Fatorda	None	South Goa	South Goa	30,845
31	Margao	None	South Goa	South Goa	29,508
32	Benaulim	None	South Goa	South Goa	28,959
33	Navelim	None	South Goa	South Goa	28,892
34	Cuncolim	None	South Goa	South Goa	29,526
35	Velim	None	South Goa	South Goa	31,534
36	Quepem	None	South Goa	South Goa	33,080
37	Curchorem	None	South Goa	South Goa	27,484
38	Sanvordem	None	South Goa	South Goa	29,808
39	Sanguem	None	South Goa	South Goa	26,659
40	Canacona	None	South Goa	South Goa	34,246

== See also ==
- List of constituencies of the Puducherry Legislative Assembly
- Daman and Diu Lok Sabha constituency
- Dadra and Nagar Haveli Lok Sabha constituency
