= Chief Minister of Goa =

Leader of the executive branch of Government of Goa

- Emblem of Goa

- Flag of India

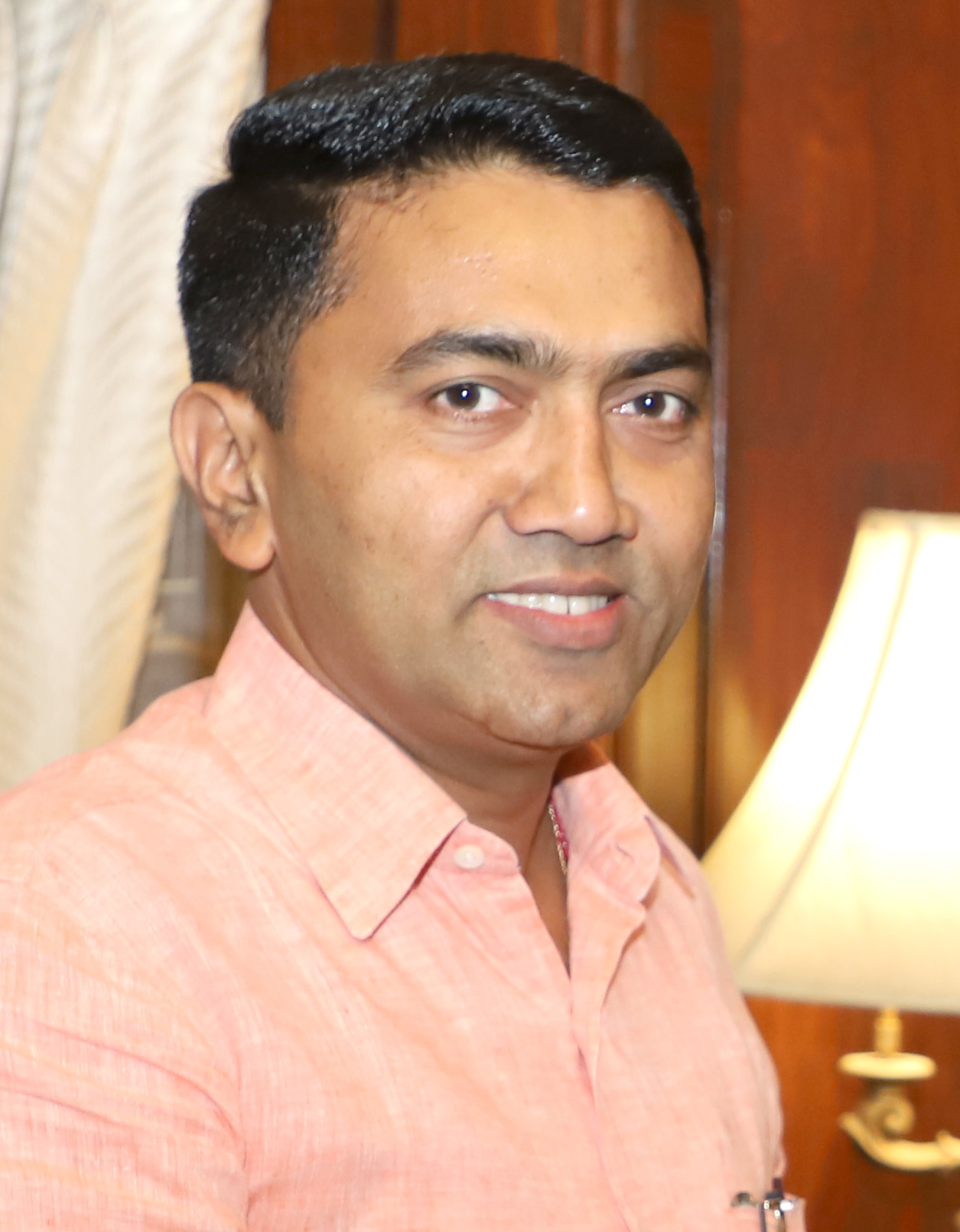
- Incumbent; Pramod Sawant since 19 March 2019
- Chief Minister's Office; Government of Goa
- Style: The Honourable
- Type: Leader of the Executive
- Status: Head of government
- Abbreviation: CMoGoa
- Member of: Legislative Assembly; State Cabinet
- Reports to: Governor of Goa; Goa Legislative Assembly
- Residence: Panaji
- Seat: State Secretariat, Panaji
- Nominator: MLAs of the majority party or alliance
- Appointer: Governor of Goa; by convention based on appointees ability to command confidence in the Legislative Assembly
- Term length: At the confidence of the assembly; Chief minister's term is for five years and is subject to no term limits.
- Inaugural holder: Pratapsingh Rane (as Chief Minister of Goa state); Dayanand Bandodkar (as Chief Minister of the Union Territory of Goa, Daman and Diu)
- Formation: 20 December 1963 (62 years ago)
- Deputy: Deputy Chief Minister of Goa
- Salary: ₹220,000 (US$2,300)
- Website: https://secretariat.goa.gov.in/cm

The chief minister of Goa is chief executive of the Indian state of Goa. As per the Constitution of India, the governor is a state's de jure head, but de facto executive authority rests with the chief minister. Following elections to the Goa Legislative Assembly, the state's governor usually invites the party (or coalition) with a majority of seats to form the government. The governor appoints the chief minister, whose council of ministers are collectively responsible to the assembly. Given that he has the confidence of the assembly, the chief minister's term is for five years and is subject to no term limits. Chief Minister also serves as Leader of the House in the Legislative Assembly.

After the annexation of Goa, the former Portuguese colony became part of the Goa, Daman and Diu union territory. In 1987 Goa achieved full statehood, while Daman and Diu became a separate union territory. Since 1963, thirteen people have served as the chief minister of Goa, Daman and Diu union territory and of Goa state. The first was Dayanand Bandodkar of the Maharashtrawadi Gomantak Party, who was succeeded by his daughter Shashikala Kakodkar, Goa's only woman chief minister. Pratapsingh Rane of the Indian National Congress, during whose reign Goa had achieved statehood, is the longest-serving officeholder also holds the record for the longest continuous tenure, with over 15 years across four discontinuous stints.

The current incumbent is Pramod Sawant of the Bharatiya Janata Party, who was sworn in on 19 March 2019 after the death of Manohar Parrikar on 17 March 2019.

== Oath as the state chief minister ==
The chief minister serves five years in the office. The following is the oath of the Deputy chief minister of state:

I, <Name of Chief Minister>, do swear in the name of God/solemnly affirm that I will bear true faith and allegiance to the Constitution of India as by law established, that I will uphold the sovereignty and integrity of India, that I will faithfully and conscientiously discharge my duties as a Minister for the State of () and that I will do right to all manner of people in accordance with the Constitution and the law without fear or favour, affection or ill-will.

Oath of Secrecy

I, <Name>, do swear in the name of God / solemnly affirm that I will not directly or indirectly communicate or reveal to any person or persons any matter which shall be brought under my consideration or shall become known to me as a Minister for the State of <Name of State> except as may be required for the due discharge of my duties as such Minister.

== Chief ministers of Goa, Daman and Diu (1963-1987) ==
Goa, Daman and Diu (Konkani: Goem, Damanv ani Diu) was a union territory of the Republic of India established in 1961 following the annexation of Portuguese India, with Maj Gen K P Candeth as its first Military Governor.

# (Note: A parenthetical number indicates that the incumbent has previously held office.)	Portrait	Name	Constituency	Term of office			Assembly (election)	Party (Note: This column only names the chief minister's party. The state government he heads may be a complex coalition of several parties and independents; these are not listed here.)
#	Portrait	Name	Constituency	From	To	Days in office	Assembly (election)	Party
1		Dayanand Bandodkar	Marcaim	20 December 1963	2 December 1966	2 years, 347 days	Interim	Maharashtrawadi Gomantak Party
–		Vacant (Note: When President's rule is in force in a state, its council of ministers stands dissolved. The office of chief minister thus lies vacant. At times, the legislative assembly also stands dissolved.) (President's rule)	N/A	2 December 1966	5 April 1967	124 days		N/A
(1)		Dayanand Bandodkar	Marcaim	5 April 1967	23 March 1972	6 years, 129 days	1st (1967 election)	Maharashtrawadi Gomantak Party
(1)		Dayanand Bandodkar	Marcaim	23 March 1972	12 August 1973	6 years, 129 days	2nd (1972 election)	Maharashtrawadi Gomantak Party
2		Shashikala Kakodkar	Bicholim	12 August 1973	7 June 1977	5 years, 258 days	2nd (1972 election)	Maharashtrawadi Gomantak Party
2		Shashikala Kakodkar	Bicholim	7 June 1977	27 April 1979	5 years, 258 days	3rd (1977 election)	Maharashtrawadi Gomantak Party
–		Vacant (President's rule)	N/A	27 April 1979	16 January 1980	264 days		N/A
3		Pratapsingh Rane	Sattari	16 January 1980	7 January 1985	7 years, 134 days	4th (1980 election)	Indian National Congress (U)
3		Pratapsingh Rane	Sattari	7 January 1985	30 May 1987	7 years, 134 days	5th (1984 election)	Indian National Congress

== Chief ministers of Goa (1987-present) ==
On 30 May 1987, the union territory was split, and Goa was made India's twenty-fifth state, with Daman and Diu remaining a union territory

#	Portrait	Name (Birth-Death)	Constituency	Term of office			Assembly (election)	Party
#	Portrait	Name (Birth-Death)	Constituency	From	To	Days in office	Assembly (election)	Party
1		Pratapsingh Rane (born 1939)	Poriem	30 May 1987	9 January 1990	2 years, 301 days	5th (1984 election)	Indian National Congress
1		Pratapsingh Rane (born 1939)	Poriem	9 January 1990	27 March 1990	2 years, 301 days	1st (1989 election)	Indian National Congress
2		Churchill Alemao (born 1949)	Benaulim	27 March 1990	14 April 1990	18 days	1st (1989 election)	Progressive Democratic Front
3		Luis Proto Barbosa (1927–2011)	Loutolim	14 April 1990	14 December 1990	244 days	1st (1989 election)	Progressive Democratic Front
–		Vacant (President's rule)	N/A	14 December 1990	25 January 1991	42 days	1st (1989 election)	N/A
4		Ravi Naik (1946–2025)	Marcaim	25 January 1991	18 May 1993	2 years, 113 days	1st (1989 election)	Indian National Congress
5		Wilfred de Souza (1927–2015)	Saligao	18 May 1993	2 April 1994	319 days	1st (1989 election)	Indian National Congress
(4)		Ravi Naik (1946–2025)	Marcaim	2 April 1994	8 April 1994	6 days	1st (1989 election)	Indian National Congress
(5)		Wilfred de Souza (1927–2015)	Saligao	8 April 1994	16 December 1994	252 days	1st (1989 election)	Indian National Congress
(1)		Pratapsingh Rane (born 1939)	Poriem	16 December 1994	29 July 1998	3 years, 225 days	2nd (1994 election)	Indian National Congress
(5)		Wilfred de Souza (1927–2015)	Saligao	29 July 1998	26 November 1998	120 days	2nd (1994 election)	Goa Rajiv Congress Party
6		Luizinho Faleiro (born 1951)	Navelim	26 November 1998	10 February 1999	79 days	2nd (1994 election)	Indian National Congress
–		Vacant (President's rule)	N/A	10 February 1999	9 June 1999	114 days		N/A
(6)		Luizinho Faleiro (born 1951)	Navelim	9 June 1999	24 November 1999	168 days	3rd (1999 election)	Indian National Congress
7		Francisco Sardinha (1955–)	Curtorim	24 November 1999	24 October 2000	335 days	3rd (1999 election)	Goa People's Congress
8		Manohar Parrikar	Panaji	24 October 2000	3 June 2002	4 years, 102 days	3rd (1999 election)	Bharatiya Janata Party
8		Manohar Parrikar	Panaji	3 June 2002	3 February 2005	4 years, 102 days	4th (2002 election)	Bharatiya Janata Party
(1)		Pratapsingh Rane (born 1939)	Poriem	3 February 2005	4 March 2005	29 days	4th (2002 election)	Indian National Congress
–		Vacant (President's rule)	N/A	4 March 2005	7 June 2005	95 days	4th (2002 election)	N/A
(1)		Pratapsingh Rane (born 1939)	Poriem	7 June 2005	8 June 2007	2 years, 1 day	4th (2002 election)	Indian National Congress
9		Digambar Kamat (born 1954)	Madgaon	8 June 2007	9 March 2012	4 years, 275 days	5th (2007 election)	Indian National Congress
(8)		Manohar Parrikar (1955–2019)	Panaji	9 March 2012	8 November 2014	2 years, 244 days	6th (2012 election)	Bharatiya Janata Party
10		Laxmikant Parsekar (born 1956)	Mandrem	8 November 2014	14 March 2017	2 years, 126 days	6th (2012 election)	Bharatiya Janata Party
(8)		Manohar Parrikar (1954–2019)	Panaji	14 March 2017	17 March 2019	2 years, 3 days	7th (2017 election)	Bharatiya Janata Party
11		Pramod Sawant (born 1973)	Sanquelim	19 March 2019	28 March 2022	7 years, 227 days	7th (2017 election)	Bharatiya Janata Party
11		Pramod Sawant (born 1973)	Sanquelim	28 March 2022	Incumbent	7 years, 227 days	8th (2022 election)	Bharatiya Janata Party

== Statistics ==
Fraction of time of holding CMO in the state of Goa by party (as of March 2026)
1. Bharatiya Janata Party (45.5%)
2. Indian National Congress (49.3%)
3. Goa People's Congress (2.44%)
4. Goa Rajiv Congress Party (0.88%)
5. President's Rule (1.84%)

#	Chief Minister	Party	Length of term	
#	Chief Minister	Party	Longest tenure	Total tenure
1	Manohar Parrikar	BJP	4 years, 102 days	8 years, 349 days
2	Pratapsingh Rane	INC	3 years, 225 days	8 years, 251 days
3	Pramod Sawant	BJP	7 years, 227 days	7 years, 227 days
4	Digambar Kamat	INC	4 years, 275 days	4 years, 275 days
5	Laxmikant Parsekar	BJP	2 years, 126 days	2 years, 126 days
6	Ravi Naik	INC	2 years, 113 days	2 years, 119 days
7	Wilfred de Souza	INC/GRCP	319 days	1 year, 326 days
8	Francisco Sardinha	GPC	335 days	335 days
9	Luis Proto Barbosa	INC	244 days	244 days
10	Luizinho Faleiro	INC	168 days	247 days
11	Churchill Alemao	INC	18 days	18 days

== See also ==
- List of governors of Goa
- Deputy Chief Minister of Goa

== Notes ==
Footnotes
