= Teotonio Pereira =

Indian politician and activist (1930–2022)

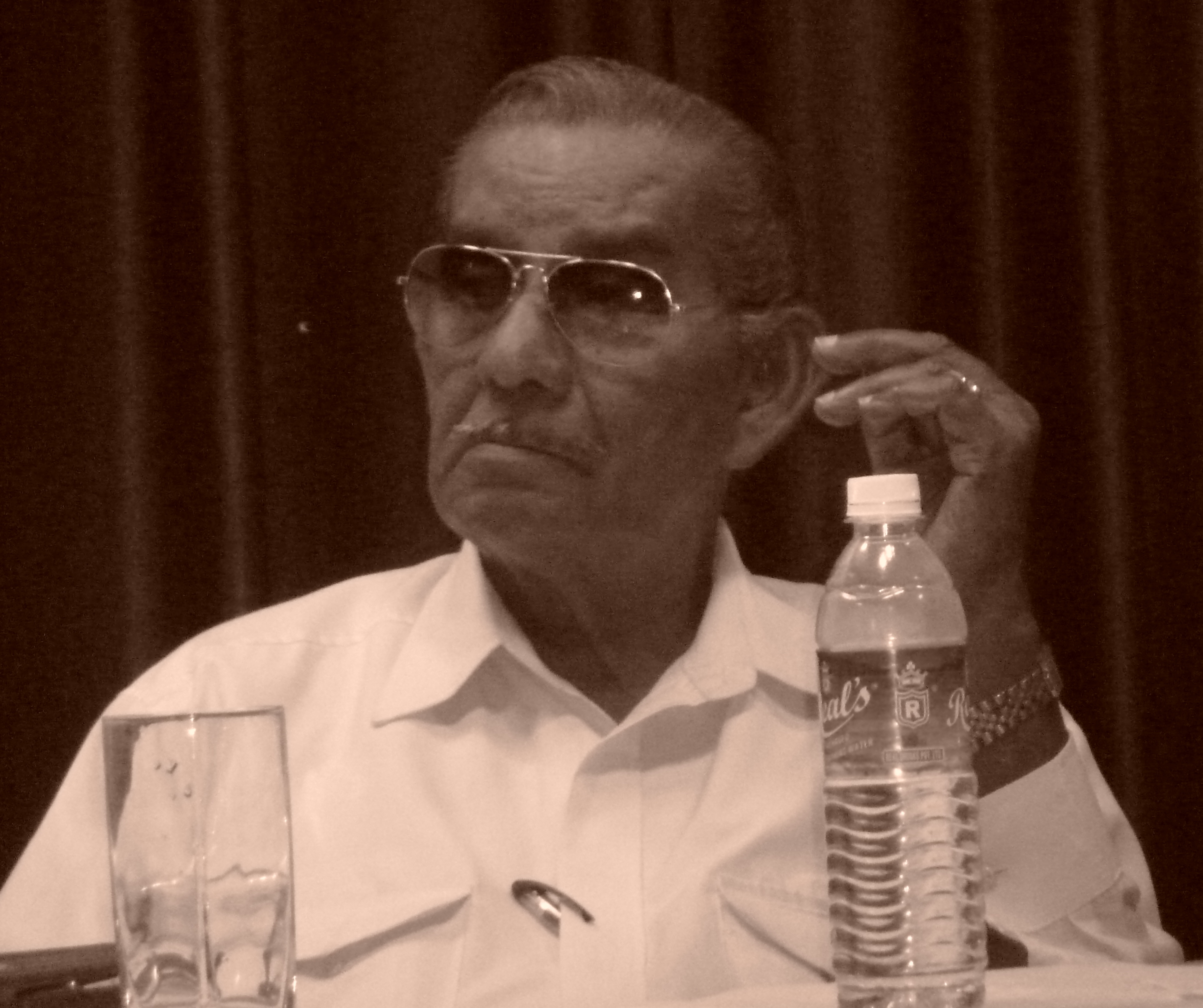
- Pereira in 2015

Member of Goa Legislative Assembly
- In office 11 December 1963 – 5 January 1977
- Preceded by: constituency established
- Succeeded by: Shripad Cuncolienkar
- Constituency: St. Andre (Note: also known as Santo Andre prior 1994.)
- Majority: 5,656 (57.47%) (Note: for the year 1967–1972; followed by the next term.); 5,335 (50.44%)
- In office 1980 – 26 December 1984
- Preceded by: Shripad Cuncolienkar
- Succeeded by: Shripad Cuncolienkar
- Constituency: St. Andre
- Majority: 4,200 (44.38%)

Personal details
- Born: Teotonio Francisco Paulo Pereira; 18 March 1930 Goa Velha, Goa, Portuguese India
- Died: 16 February 2022 (aged 91) Mapusa, Goa, India
- Resting place: St. Jerome Cemetery, Mapusa, Goa, India
- Party: United Goans Democratic Party (2002–2022) (Note: joined the party in c. 2002; may have left later.)
- Other political affiliations: United Goans (Sequiera Group) (1963–1977); Janata Party (1977–1980); Indian National Congress (U) (1980–1984) (Note: majority of sources cited claim that Pereira was a member of the Indian National Congress (U), the official source from goavidhansabha.gov.in states that Pereira was a member of Congress (I).); Independent (1984–2002)
- Spouse: Adelaide Novais Pereira
- Children: 8; one deceased
- Occupation: Politician; activist; businessman
- Committees: Petitions; Library; The Goa, Daman and Diu Registration of Tourist Trade Bill

Teotonio Francisco Paulo Pereira (Note: Some sources claim that Pereira's middle name was John.) (18 March 1930 – 16 February 2022) was an Indian politician, independence activist, musician, and businessman who served as a member of the Goa Legislative Assembly, representing the St. Andre Assembly constituency from 1963 to 1977 and 1980 to 1984.

== Early and personal life ==
Teotonio Francisco Paulo Pereira was born in Goa Velha, Goa. He completed his primary education from Govt. Primary School. He later completed his schooling from People's High School at Panaji. Pereira was married to Adelaide Novais Pereira, they had 9 children together. On 29 September 2020, Mario Pereira, aged 62, his fourth child died from COVID-19. Pereira was a polyglot and spoke Konkani, Portuguese, English and Hindi.

Some of his hobbies included driving, gardening and singing, he also had a special interest in the transport business. Few of his recreation activities included football, movies, carom and dramas. Pereira also organized dramatic performances and folk songs.

== Political career ==
Pereira was a four-term member of the Goa Legislative Assembly. He first contested in the 1963 Goa, Daman and Diu Legislative Assembly election from the St. Andre Assembly constituency on the United Goans (Sequiera Group) (UGS) ticket and emerged victorious by defeating chief ministerial candidate, Vishwanath Lawande of the Maharashtrawadi Gomantak Party (MGP). He served for five years from 1963 to 1967. He then successfully contested in the 1967 Goa, Daman and Diu Legislative Assembly election from the same constituency on the UGS ticket, he defeated MGP candidate, Melo Agosttinho Santana by a margin of 2,190 votes.

Pereira then contested in the 1972 Goa, Daman and Diu Legislative Assembly election from the same constituency on the UGS ticket, he emerged victorious by defeating MGP candidate, Melo Agosttinho Santana by a margin of 1,366 votes. He then unsuccessfully contested in the 1977 Goa, Daman and Diu Legislative Assembly election from the same consistency on the Janata Party ticket, he lost to Indian National Congress (INC) candidate, Shripad Cuncolienkar by a margin of 405 votes.

Pereira next successfully contested in the 1980 Goa, Daman and Diu Legislative Assembly election from the St. Andre Assembly constituency on the Indian National Congress (U) ticket. He defeated MGP candidate, Shripad Cuncolienkar by a margin of 771 votes. He next unsuccessfully contested in the 1984 Goa, Daman and Diu Legislative Assembly election from the same constituency as an independent candidate. He lost to INC candidate, Shripad Cuncolienkar by a margin of 1279 votes.

Following his defeat in the prior election, Pereira didn't contest the 1989 Goa Legislative Assembly election. He next unsuccessfully contested the 1994 Goa Legislative Assembly election from the St. Andre Assembly constituency as an independent candidate, he lost to INC member, Carmo Pegado by a margin of 6237 votes. Pereira last unsuccessfully contested in the 2002 Goa Legislative Assembly election from the same constituency on the United Goans Democratic Party ticket, he lost to INC candidate, Francisco Silveira by a margin of 6775 votes.

== Death ==
On 16 February 2022, Pereira died from a brief illness while undergoing treatment at a private hospital in Mapusa. The funeral service was held the next day at 4:00 pm IST at St. Jerome Church, Mapusa. The Goa Police honoured him with a 21-gun salute. Among those present at the funeral were Bishop Emeritus of Port Blair, Aleixo das Neves Dias, former St.Andre legislator, Francisco Silveira, Mapusa legislator, Joshua D'Souza, former union minister, Ramakant Khalap, former speaker of the Goa Legislative Assembly, Tomazinho Cardozo and former MMC chairperson, Armindo Braganza.

=== Reactions ===
Former Goa Leader of Opposition, Digambar Kamat expressed his grief and gave his condolences to the family. Goa chief minister, Pramod Sawant said that he was saddened by the demise of Pereira and also gave his condolences to the family on Twitter. Fatorda MLA, Vijai Sardesai also tweeted, "An Era Ends; The demise of Teotonio Pereira, a member of Goa’s first legislative assembly brings profound sadness. He fought for Goa and her honour; her identity, culture and language".

Ramakant Khalap and his family mourned the death of his neighbour and friend. He stated that Pereira was a multifaceted person who was deeply rooted in the Goan soil and defined him a real bhumiputra. He also added that despite being from two different opposing political parties it never affected their friendship, Khalap also recalls that Pereira invited him to organise his wedding reception on the rooftop of his newly built house in 1977. He further added that Pereira was a singer, composer and artist and above all a decent human being.

Former St. Andre M.L.A, Francisco Silveira in his condolence message added that Pereira will be always remembered for his work and being the leader of the common people in the St. Andre constituency. He further added that he was a good orator who won the hearts of the people and his selfless contribution in the constituency made him the leader of masses.

== Positions held ==
- Member of the Committee of Petitions, 1964–65; 1965–66; 1967–68 (resigned in September 1967 from Committees of the House), 1970–71, 1971–72, 1972–73 and 1973–74
- Chairman of Library Committee, 1980–81
- Member of Select Committee on Bill No. 25 of 1980- The Goa, Daman and Diu Registration of Tourist Trade Bill, 1980
