= 1967 Goa, Daman and Diu Legislative Assembly election =

Election in Indian state

- 21 February 1967

All 30 assembly constituencies 16 seats needed for a majority
- Registered: 418,404
- Turnout: 68.25%
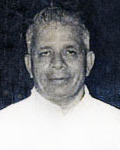
	Majority party	Minority party
		UGP
Leader	Dayanand Bandodkar	Jack Sequeira
Party	MGP	UGP
Leader's seat	Marcaim	St. Cruz
Seats before	14	12
Seats won	16	12
Seat change	▲2	0
Percentage	40.42%	37.98%
CM before election
Dayanand Bandodkar
MGP
Elected CM
Dayanand Bandodkar
MGP

Elections were held in February 1967, in the Indian Union territory of Goa, Daman and Diu, to elect 30 members to the Goa, Daman & Diu Legislative Assembly.

== Results ==
Summary of results of the Goa, Daman & Diu Legislative Assembly election, 1967
Political Party	Seats contested	Seats won	Number of Votes	% of Votes
Maharashtrawadi Gomantak Party	26	16	111,110	40.42%
United Goans Party (Sequeira Group)	30	12	104,426	37.98%
Independents	156	2	48,471	17.63%
Total	226	30	274,92	

=== Results by constituency ===
Winner, runner-up, voter turnout, and victory margin in every constituency
Assembly Constituency		Turnout	Winner				Runner Up				Margin
#k	Names	%	Candidate	Party	Votes	%	Candidate	Party	Votes	%	Margin
1	Pernem	64.22%	K. B. Laxman	MGP	4,499	60.15%	B. Desprabhu	Independent	2,181	29.16%	2,318
2	Mandrem	64.52%	Anthony de Souza (politician)Anthony D'Souza	MGP	6,907	71.65%	K. M. Vinayak	UGP	1,540	15.98%	5,367
3	Siolim	73.36%	Punaji Achrekar	MGP	5,175	50.35%	D. Zeferino	UGP	4,556	44.32%	619
4	Calangute	74.17%	S. Valente	UGP	6,329	54.29%	M. R. Dharma	MGP	4,633	39.74%	1,696
5	Aldona	73.49%	Lobo Sequeira Orlando	UGP	6,084	57.79%	M. N. Pandharinath	MGP	3,969	37.7%	2,115
6	Mapusa	72.2%	Gopal Mayekar	MGP	5,476	52.57%	K. T. Mangesh	UGP	4,040	38.79%	1,436
7	Tivim	63.89%	Jaisingrao Rane	MGP	4,761	61.26%	N. Narayananant	UGP	1,794	23.08%	2,967
8	Bicholim	70.39%	C. D. Keshav	MGP	5,565	66.96%	S. S. Sakharam	Independent	1,149	13.83%	4,416
9	Pale	66.02%	A. K. S. Usgaonkar	MGP	5,671	65.09%	S. U. P. Krishna	Independent	1,961	22.51%	3,710
10	Sattari	57.7%	Gopal Kamat	MGP	2,962	40.04%	D. B. Hirojirao	Independent	1,068	14.44%	1,894
11	Panaji	66.97%	Y. S. Desai	UGP	3,846	42.56%	T. M. Upendra	MGP	3,776	41.78%	70
12	St. Cruz	77.33%	Jack de Sequeira	UGP	7,087	59.94%	J. L. C. Araujo	United Goans Party (Furtado Group)	4,045	34.21%	3,042
13	St. Andre	71.75%	Teotonio Pereira	UGP	5,656	57.47%	Melo Agosttinho Santana	MGP	3,466	35.22%	2,190
14	Cumbarjua	67.27%	B. P. Shrinivas	MGP	5,296	54.67%	J. T. Timotio	UGP	3,355	34.63%	1,941
15	Marcaim	71.14%	B. D. Balkrishna	MGP	7,800	92.4%	K. T. Pundlik	UGP	423	5.01%	7,377
16	Ponda	68.49%	Shashikala Kakodkar	MGP	7,144	76.66%	K. S. Dattatray	UGP	1,567	16.82%	5,577
17	Siroda	59.26%	Vittal Karmali	MGP	4,571	53.%	J. F. S. Fernandes	UGP	1,294	15.%	3,277
18	Sanguem	62.57%	M. V. Datta	MGP	4,646	58.85%	S. H. A. Lathif	UGP	2,785	35.28%	1,861
19	Canacona	66.15%	N. G. M. Balkrishna	MGP	5,126	58.95%	M. R. Desai	UGP	2,141	24.62%	2,985
20	Quepem	66.%	Shaba Desai	MGP	2,955	44.39%	D. S. Yeshvant	UGP	1,734	26.05%	1,221
21	Curchorem	65.09%	Abdul Razak	UGP	3,657	42.84%	N. X. G. Desai	MGP	3,519	41.23%	138
22	Cuncolim	62.01%	Roque Santana Fernandes	UGP	3,774	43.62%	K. M. Jaiwant	MGP	1,720	19.88%	2,054
23	Benaulim	62.54%	M. E. Jose	UGP	6,528	74.53%	C. F. Clodomiro	Independent	1,008	11.51%	5,520
24	Navelim	62.1%	Leo Velho Mauricio	UGP	6,546	59.5%	D. P. Santano	MGP	2,831	25.73%	3,715
25	Margao	64.26%	N. A. Narcinva	UGP	4,905	57.89%	S. V. Purshotam	MGP	2,832	33.42%	2,073
26	Curtorim	59.81%	Barretto Roque Joaquim	UGP	8,778	86.39%	C. A. M. Jose	Independent	556	5.47%	8,222
27	Cortalim	65.1%	L. P. Barbosa	UGP	6,977	77.03%	L. C. Carvalho	Independent	1,662	18.35%	5,315
28	Mormugao	54.29%	Gajanan Patil	MGP	5,570	46.11%	M. R. Manuel	UGP	3,932	32.55%	1,638
29	Daman	60.62%	M. M. Bhathala	Independent	2,775	29.48%	B. O. Pandya	UGP	2,544	27.02%	231
30	Diu	66.33%	F. N. Srinivassa	Independent	1,552	23.6%	A. R. Hadmat	Independent	1,501	22.83%	51

==== By Elections ====
No.	Constituency	Winner	Party
1	Shiroda	Krishnanath Baburao Naik	Maharashtrawadi Gomantak Party
2	Pernem	Bhalchandra Kinlekar	Maharashtrawadi Gomantak Party

== See also ==
- Elections in Goa
- 1967 elections in India
