= 1961 census of India =

- 10 to 28 February 1961

General information
- Country: India

Results
- Total population: 438,936,918 (21.62)
- Most populous region: Uttar Pradesh (70,144,160)
- Least populous region: Sikkim (162,863)

The 1961 census of India was the tenth in a series of censuses held in India every decade since 1871.

The population of India was counted as 438,936,918 people.

== Population by state ==
Population of Indian states and union territories in 1961
State/Union Territory	Population
Andhra Pradesh	35.99 million
Assam	11.87 million
Bihar	46.45 million
Gujarat	20.63 million
Jammu and Kashmir	3.56 million
Kerala	16.9 million
Madhya Pradesh	32.37 million
Madras	33.68 million
Maharashtra	41.64 million
Maharashtra	39.55 million
Mysore	23.58 million
Orissa	17.54 million
Punjab	20.3 million
Rajasthan	21.15 million
Uttar Pradesh	73.74 million
West Bengal	34.92 million
Andaman and Nicobar Islands	63,548
Delhi	2.65 million
Himachal Pradesh	1.35 million
Lakshadweep	24,108
Manipur	780,037
Tripura	1.14 million
Dadra and Nagar Haveli	57,963
Goa, Daman and Diu	626,978
North-East Frontier Agency	336,558
Nagaland	369,200
Pondicherry	369,079
Sikkim	162,189

== Language data ==
The 1961 census recognized 1,652 mother tongues, counting all declarations made by any individual at the time when the census was conducted. However, the declaring individuals often mixed names of languages with those of dialects, sub-dialects and dialect clusters or even castes, professions, religions, localities, regions, countries and nationalities. The list therefore includes "languages" with barely a few individual speakers as well as 530 unclassified "mother tongues" and more than 100 idioms that are non-native to India, including linguistically unspecific demonyms such as "African", "Canadian" or "Belgian". Modifications were done by bringing in two additional components- place of birth i.e. village or town and duration of stay (if born elsewhere).

== See also ==
- Demographics of India
