= 1984 elections in India =

Elections in India
- 1984

== General Elections ==
Party	Votes	%	Seats
Indian National Congress	115,478,267	49.10	404
Bharatiya Janata Party	18,202,853	7.74	2
Janata Party	16,210,514	6.89	10
Lokdal	14,040,064	5.97	3
Communist Party of India (Marxist)	13,809,950	5.87	22
Telugu Desam Party	10,132,859	4.31	30
Communist Party of India	6,363,430	2.71	6
Dravida Munnetra Kazhagam	5,695,179	2.42	2
All India Anna Dravida Munnetra Kazhagam	3,968,967	1.69	12
Indian Congress (Socialist)	3,577,377	1.52	4
Indian National Congress (Jagjivan)	1,511,515	0.64	1
Revolutionary Socialist Party	1,173,869	0.50	3
All India Forward Bloc	1,055,556	0.45	2
Jammu & Kashmir National Conference	1,010,243	0.43	3
Indian Union Muslim League	658,821	0.28	2
Kerala Congress (Joseph)	598,113	0.25	2
Doordarshi Party	508,426	0.22	0
Peasants and Workers Party of India	463,963	0.20	1
Jharkhand Mukti Morcha	332,403	0.14	0
Kerala Congress	258,591	0.11	0
All India Muslim League	224,155	0.10	0
Gandhi Kamraj National Congress	217,104	0.09	0
Socialist Unity Centre of India	196,767	0.08	0
Republican Party of India (Khobragade)	165,320	0.07	0
Manipur Peoples Party	149,019	0.06	0
Tamil Nadu Congress (K)	144,076	0.06	0
Naga National Democratic Party	113,919	0.05	0
Jammu & Kashmir Panthers Party	95,149	0.04	0
Maharashtrawadi Gomantak Party	83,122	0.04	0
People's Party of Arunachal	78,455	0.03	0
Republican Party of India	22,877	0.01	0
Jharkhand Party	18,837	0.01	0
Jammu & Kashmir Peoples Conference	646	0.00	0
Independents	18,623,803	7.92	5
Appointed Anglo-Indians			2
Total	235,184,209	100.00	516
Valid votes	235,184,209	97.49	
Invalid/blank votes	6,062,678	2.51	
Total votes	241,246,887	100.00	
Registered voters/turnout	379,540,608	63.56	
Source: ECI

=== Delayed elections in Assam and Punjab ===
Results from 1985

Party	Votes	%	Seats
Indian National Congress	4,628,777	32.14	10
Shiromani Akali Dal	2,577,279	17.90	7
Communist Party of India (Marxist)	462,576	3.21	0
Indian Congress (Socialist)	457,705	3.18	1
Communist Party of India	369,687	2.57	0
Plain Tribals Council of Assam	310,150	2.15	1
Bharatiya Janata Party	263,284	1.83	0
Janata Party	420,082	2.92	0
Lokdal	46,627	0.32	0
Independents	4,864,958	33.78	8
Total	14,401,125	100.00	27
Valid votes	14,401,125	95.70	
Invalid/blank votes	646,951	4.30	
Total votes	15,048,076	100.00	
Registered voters/turnout	20,834,725	72.23	
Source: ECI

== Overall result ==
Date(s)	State	Government before	Chief Minister before	Government after	Elected Chief Minister	Maps
25 April 1984	Mizoram	Mizoram People's Conference	T. Sailo	Indian National Congress	Lal Thanhawla	
24 December 1984	Tamil Nadu	All India Anna Dravida Munnetra Kazhagam	M. G. Ramachandran	All India Anna Dravida Munnetra Kazhagam	M. G. Ramachandran	
24 December 1984	Arunachal Pradesh	Indian National Congress	Gegong Apang	Indian National Congress	Gegong Apang	
27 December 1984	Goa	Indian National Congress	Pratapsingh Rane	Indian National Congress	Pratapsingh Rane	
27 December 1984 and 3 May 1985	Manipur	Indian National Congress	Rishang Keishing	Indian National Congress	Rishang Keishing	

== Legislative Assembly elections ==
=== Arunachal Pradesh ===
Party	Contested	Won	Votes	%
INC	30	21	96791	43.07%
PPA	13	4	34910	15.54%
BJP	6	1	17,283	7.69%
JNP	3	0	845	0.38%
Independents	63	4	74888	33.33%
Total	115	30	224717	

=== Goa, Daman and Diu ===
Party	Votes	%	Seats	+/–
Indian National Congress	160,944	39.48	18	+18
Maharashtrawadi Gomantak Party	86,100	21.12	8	+1
Bharatiya Janata Party	4,915	1.21	0	New
Janata Party	3,013	0.74	0	0
Communist Party of India	1,554	0.38	0	New
Communist Party of India (Marxist)	756	0.19	0	0
Independents	150,424	36.90	4	+1
Total	407,706	100.00	30	0
Valid votes	407,706	96.72		
Invalid/blank votes	13,844	3.28		
Total votes	421,550	100.00		
Registered voters/turnout	586,657	71.86		
Source: ECI

=== Manipur ===
Party	Votes	%	Seats	+/–
Indian National Congress	257,809	29.82	30	+30
Manipur Peoples Party	93,421	10.81	3	–1
Janata Party	52,530	6.08	4	–6
Communist Party of India	35,852	4.15	1	–4
Indian Congress (Socialist)	28,156	3.26	0	New
Kuki National Assembly	13,367	1.55	1	–1
Bharatiya Janata Party	6,163	0.71	0	New
Lok Dal	3,653	0.42	0	New
Communist Party of India (Marxist)	790	0.09	0	–1
Independents	372,766	43.12	21	+2
Total	864,507	100.00	60	0
Valid votes	864,507	97.70		
Invalid/blank votes	20,362	2.30		
Total votes	884,869	100.00		
Registered voters/turnout	1,013,680	87.29		
Source: ECI

=== Mizoram ===
Party	Votes	%	Seats	+/–
Indian National Congress (I)	74,005	39.81	20	▲15
Mizoram People's Conference	66,065	35.54	8	▼10
Independents	45,819	24.65	2	▼3
Total	185,889	100.00	30	0
Valid votes	185,889	98.68		
Invalid/blank votes	2,490	1.32		
Total votes	188,379	100.00		
Registered voters/turnout	256,530	73.43		
Source: ECI

=== Tamilnadu ===
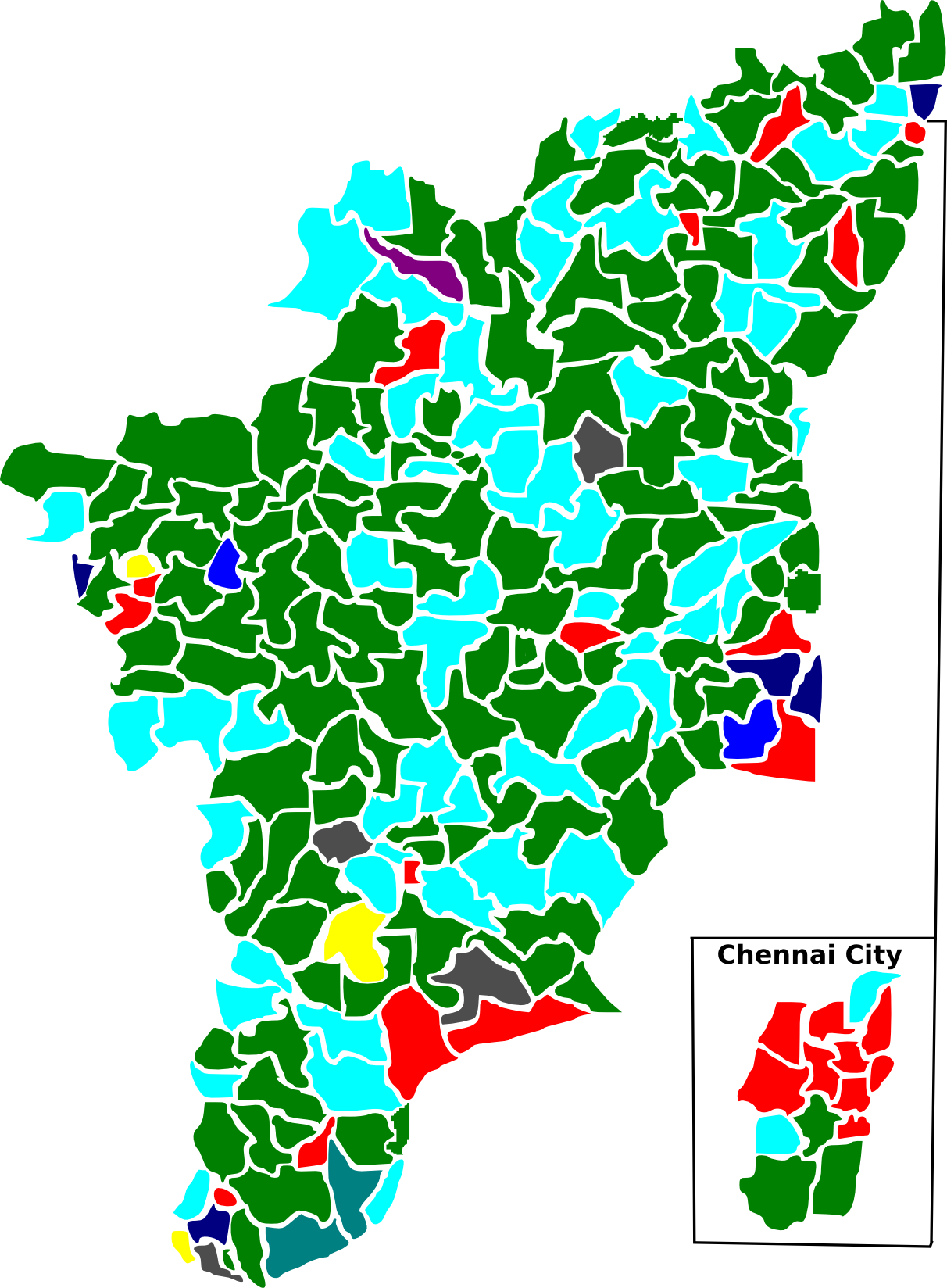
Election map of results based on parties. Colours are based on the results table on the left

Alliance/Party	Seats won	Change	Popular Vote	Vote %	Adj. %^{‡}
AIADMK+ alliance	195	+29	11,681,221	53.9%	
AIADMK	132	+3	8,030,809	37.0%	54.3%
INC	61	+30	3,529,708	16.3%	54.5%
Indian National Congress breakaway parties	2	-4	120,704	0.6%	40.4%
DMK+ alliance	34	-25	8,021,293	37.0%	
DMK	24	-13	6,362,770	29.3%	40.8%
CPI(M)	5	-6	597,622	2.8%	39.6%
JP	3	+1	493,374	2.3%	36.4%
CPI	2	-7	567,527	2.6%	35.5%
Others	5	-4	1,983,959	9.1%	
Independent	4	-4	1,619,921	7.5%	7.9%
AKD	1	–	47,212	0.7%	57.2%
TNC(K)	0	–	152,315	0.7%	34.9%
INC(J)	0	–	110,121	0.5%	3.2%
BJP	0	–	54,390	0.3%	3.7%
Total	234	–	21,686,473	100%	–

‡: Vote % reflects the percentage of votes the party received compared to the entire electorate that voted in this election. Adjusted (Adj.) Vote %, reflects the % of votes the party received per constituency that they contested.
Sources: ECI
