= Shiroda Assembly constituency =

Legislative Assembly constituency in Goa State, India

Coordinates: 15.32°N 74.02°E

Shiroda
- Constituency No. 22 for the Goa Legislative Assembly

Constituency details
- Country: India
- Region: Western India
- State: Goa
- District: North Goa
- Lok Sabha constituency: South Goa
- Established: 1963
- Total electors: 29,678
- Reservation: None

Member of Legislative Assembly
- 8th Goa Legislative Assembly
- Incumbent Subhash Shirodkar
- Party: Bharatiya Janata Party

Shiroda Assembly constituency is one of the 40 Goa Legislative Assembly constituencies of the state of Goa in southern India. Siroda is also one of the 20 constituencies falling under South Goa Lok Sabha constituency. Siroda borders 8 other constituencies; the most for any constituency in Goa.

== Members of Legislative Assembly ==
Year	Member	Party
1963	Pundalik Naik	Maharashtrawadi Gomantak Party
1967	Vittal Karmali	Maharashtrawadi Gomantak Party
1968 (Note: by-election)	Krishnanath Naik	Maharashtrawadi Gomantak Party
1972	Jayakrishna Naik	Maharashtrawadi Gomantak Party
1977	Jayakrishna Naik	Maharashtrawadi Gomantak Party
1980	Ramchandra Prabhu	Indian National Congress
1984	Subhash Shirodkar	Indian National Congress
1989	Subhash Shirodkar	Indian National Congress
1994	Subhash Shirodkar	Indian National Congress
1999	Subhash Shirodkar	Indian National Congress
2002	Subhash Shirodkar	Indian National Congress
2007	Mahadev Naik	Bharatiya Janata Party
2012	Mahadev Naik	Bharatiya Janata Party
2017	Subhash Shirodkar	Indian National Congress
2019 (Note: by-election)	Subhash Shirodkar	Bharatiya Janata Party
2022	Subhash Shirodkar	Bharatiya Janata Party

== Election results ==
=== 2027 Assembly election ===
2027 Goa Legislative Assembly election: Shiroda
Party	Candidate	Votes	%	±%
INC				
NDA				
NOTA	None of the above			
Majority				
Turnout				
gain from		Swing		

=== Assembly Election 2022 ===
2022 Goa Legislative Assembly election : Siroda
Party	Candidate	Votes	%	±%
BJP	Subhash Shirodkar	8,307	33.18%	▼10.94
AAP	Mahadev Naik	6,133	24.50%	▲23.54
RGP	Shailesh Naik	5,063	20.22%	New
MGP	Sanket Naik Mule	2,397	9.57%	▼34.23
INC	Tukaram Borkar	1,953	7.80%	▼2.14
NCP	Subhash Prabhudesai	576	2.30%	New
NOTA	None of the Above	235	0.94%	New
Margin of victory		2,174	8.68%	▲8.37
Turnout		25,034	84.36%	▲0.93
Registered electors		29,674		▲2.46
BJP hold		Swing	▼10.94	

=== Assembly By-election 2019 ===
2019 Goa Legislative Assembly by-election : Siroda
Party	Candidate	Votes	%	±%
BJP	Subhash Shirodkar	10,661	44.12%	▲18.59
MGP	Pandurang Alias Deepak Madhav Dhavalikar	10,585	43.81%	▲20.19
INC	Mahadev Narayan Naik	2,402	9.94%	▼35.36
GSM	Santosh Pandhari Satarkar	284	1.18%	New
AAP	Yogesh Vishwanath Khandeparkar	231	0.96%	▼1.42
Margin of victory		76	0.31%	▼19.46
Turnout		24,163	83.43%	▼3.69
Registered electors		28,962		▲2.47
BJP gain from INC		Swing	▼1.18	

=== Assembly Election 2017 ===
2017 Goa Legislative Assembly election : Siroda
Party	Candidate	Votes	%	±%
INC	Subhash Shirodkar	11,156	45.31%	▲2.00
BJP	Mahadev Naik	6,286	25.53%	▼27.62
MGP	Abhay Ramchandra Prabhu	5,815	23.62%	New
AAP	Molu Anand Velip	586	2.38%	New
Independent	Nilesh Govind Gaonkar	447	1.82%	New
NOTA	None of the Above	194	0.79%	New
Margin of victory		4,870	19.78%	▲9.94
Turnout		24,624	87.12%	▼1.18
Registered electors		28,265		▲8.59
INC gain from BJP		Swing	▼7.84	

=== Assembly Election 2012 ===
2012 Goa Legislative Assembly election : Siroda
Party	Candidate	Votes	%	±%
BJP	Mahadev Naik	12,216	53.15%	▲4.44
INC	Subhash Shirodkar	9,954	43.31%	▼4.16
Independent	Vishwas Prabhudesai	422	1.84%	New
AITC	Shaila Shenvi Borkar	230	1.00%	New
SP	Savio Fernandes	162	0.70%	New
Margin of victory		2,262	9.84%	▲8.59
Turnout		22,985	88.30%	▲10.90
Registered electors		26,030		▲0.93
BJP hold		Swing	▲4.44	

=== Assembly Election 2007 ===
2007 Goa Legislative Assembly election : Siroda
Party	Candidate	Votes	%	±%
BJP	Mahadev Naik	9,725	48.71%	▲2.91
INC	Shirodkar Subhash Ankush	9,476	47.47%	▼4.38
MGP	Khedekar Yeshwant Uttam	701	3.51%	▲1.31
Margin of victory		249	1.25%	▼4.80
Turnout		19,964	77.17%	▼0.98
Registered electors		25,791		▲7.65
BJP gain from INC		Swing		

=== Assembly Election 2002 ===
2002 Goa Legislative Assembly election : Siroda
Party	Candidate	Votes	%	±%
INC	Subhash Shirodkar	9,738	51.85%	▼4.65
BJP	Prabhu Vishwanath Tukaram	8,603	45.81%	New
MGP	Shirodkar Rohidas Baburao	414	2.20%	New
Margin of victory		1,135	6.04%	▼12.95
Turnout		18,781	78.28%	▲2.53
Registered electors		23,958		▲7.56
INC hold		Swing		

=== Assembly Election 1999 ===
1999 Goa Legislative Assembly election : Siroda
Party	Candidate	Votes	%	±%
INC	Subhash Shirodkar	9,548	56.50%	▲19.33
BJP	Naik Manohar Gopal	6,339	37.51%	New
MGP	Gaonkar Babuso Savlo	995	5.89%	New
Margin of victory		3,209	18.99%	▲18.38
Turnout		16,898	75.79%	▼3.71
Registered electors		22,275		▲5.31
INC hold		Swing		

=== Assembly Election 1994 ===
1994 Goa Legislative Assembly election : Siroda
Party	Candidate	Votes	%	±%
INC	Subhash Shirodkar	6,257	37.18%	▼4.17
BJP	Naik Manohar Gopal	6,154	36.57%	New
Independent	Gudino Alexinho Menino	3,254	19.33%	New
Independent	Shirodkar Rohidas Baburao	392	2.33%	New
UGDP	Naik Rama Babuso	272	1.62%	New
Independent	Tendulkar Satish Morari	190	1.13%	New
Margin of victory		103	0.61%	▼1.34
Turnout		16,830	78.58%	▲3.23
Registered electors		21,151		▲10.43
INC hold		Swing	▼4.17	

=== Assembly Election 1989 ===
1989 Goa Legislative Assembly election : Siroda
Party	Candidate	Votes	%	±%
INC	Subhash Shirodkar	6,046	41.35%	▼5.47
MGP	Naik Ramdas Topyo	5,761	39.40%	New
Independent	Rohidas Baburao Shirodkar	1,039	7.11%	New
Independent	Gudinho Joaquim Joao	522	3.10%	New
Independent	Naik Mhalu Gangaram	387	2.30%	New
Independent	Atmaram Shambhu Naik Prataprao Sardessai	207	1.23%	New
Independent	Naik Umesh Noru	167	0.99%	New
Margin of victory		285	1.95%	▼23.27
Turnout		14,622	74.83%	▲2.28
Registered electors		19,154		▼1.19
INC hold		Swing	▼5.47	

=== Assembly Election 1984 ===
1984 Goa, Daman and Diu Legislative Assembly election : Siroda
Party	Candidate	Votes	%	±%
INC	Subhash Shirodkar	6,722	46.82%	New
Independent	Shirodkar Jaikrishna Putu	3,102	21.61%	New
MGP	Naik Gajanan Tilu	2,487	17.32%	New
Independent	D'Costa Agnel Sebastiao	792	5.52%	New
Independent	Naik Laxman Bhiki	344	2.40%	New
BJP	Shet Shirodkar	328	2.28%	New
Margin of victory		3,620	25.21%	▲22.06
Turnout		14,357	71.50%	▼2.41
Registered electors		19,385		▲10.21
INC gain from INC(U)		Swing	▼0.13	

=== Assembly Election 1980 ===
1980 Goa, Daman and Diu Legislative Assembly election : Siroda
Party	Candidate	Votes	%	±%
INC(U)	Prabhu Ramchandra Tukaram	6,315	46.95%	New
MGP	Naik Jaykrishna Putu	5,891	43.80%	
Independent	Shirodkar Basssant Shankar	620	4.61%	New
Independent	Kudchadkar Sadanand Vishvanath	172	1.28%	New
Independent	Gavde Jiv Ram	120	0.89%	New
Independent	Gaonkar Shankar Vishnu	76	0.57%	New
Margin of victory		424	3.15%	▼25.67
Turnout		13,450	75.01%	▲12.35
Registered electors		17,589		▲9.22
INC(U) gain from MGP		Swing	▼10.81	

=== Assembly Election 1977 ===
1977 Goa, Daman and Diu Legislative Assembly election : Siroda
Party	Candidate	Votes	%	±%
MGP	Naik Jayakrishna Putu	5,964	57.76%	▼1.48
INC	Shirodhar Vassanta Shankar	2,988	28.94%	New
JP	Ramnathkar Savita Ratanji	983	9.52%	New
Independent	Naik Narayan Pandurang	207	2.00%	New
Independent	Vasudev Anant Pednekar	31	0.30%	New
Margin of victory		2,976	28.82%	▼16.13
Turnout		10,325	63.17%	▼2.61
Registered electors		16,104		▲7.74
MGP hold		Swing	▼1.48	

=== Assembly Election 1972 ===
1972 Goa, Daman and Diu Legislative Assembly election : Siroda
Party	Candidate	Votes	%	±%
MGP	Jayakrishna Putu Naik	5,908	59.24%	New
UGP	Tendolkar N Narahari	1,425	14.29%	New
INC	Sulochana Ramakanta	1,234	12.37%	New
MGP	Gaunkar Jivu Bhagdo	937	9.40%	New
ABJS	Naik Gopinath Babusso	174	1.74%	New
Independent	Fernandes Angelo Pedro	126	1.26%	New
Margin of victory		4,483	44.95%	
Turnout		9,973	65.59%	
Registered electors		14,947		
MGP hold		Swing		

=== Assembly By-election 1968 ===
1968 Goa Legislative Assembly by-election : Siroda
Party	Candidate	Votes	%	±%
MGP	N. K. Baburao	3,447		
UGP	K. Narveker	2,159		New
Independent	D. Raghunathrao	1,329		New
Independent	F. S. Tony	1,171		New
Independent	N. P. Sagun	233		New
Margin of victory		1,288		
MGP hold		Swing		

=== Assembly Election 1967 ===
1967 Goa, Daman and Diu Legislative Assembly election : Siroda
Party	Candidate	Votes	%	±%
MGP	Vittal Karmali	4,571	50.12%	New
UGP	J. F. S. Fernandes	1,294	14.19%	New
Independent	D. R. Madhavrao	940	10.31%	New
Independent	N. J. Putu	877	9.62%	New
Independent	T. D. Srinivas	390	4.28%	New
Independent	P. C. Loli	280	3.07%	New
Independent	A. Sousa	144	1.58%	New
Margin of victory		3,277	35.93%	
Turnout		9,121	59.26%	
Registered electors		14,554		
MGP win (new seat)				

== See also ==
- List of constituencies of the Goa Legislative Assembly
- North Goa district
