= Diu Assembly constituency =

Constituency of the Goa legislative assembly in India

Diu
- Former constituency for the Goa Legislative Assembly

Constituency details
- Country: India
- Region: Western India
- State: Goa
- Established: 1967
- Abolished: 1989
- Total electors: 16,863

DIU Assembly constituency was an assembly constituency in the India state of Goa.

== Members of the Legislative Assembly ==
Election	Member	Party
1967	F. N. Srinivassa	Independent politician
1972	Fordo Narayan Shrinivas	Independent politician
1977	Fugro Narayan Shrinivas	Independent politician
1980	Solanki Somji Bhikha	Maharashtrawadi Gomantak Party
1984	Solanki Shamjibhai Bhikha	Indian National Congress

== Election results ==
=== Assembly Election 1984 ===
1984 Goa, Daman and Diu Legislative Assembly election : Diu
Party	Candidate	Votes	%	±%
INC	Solanki Shamjibhai Bhikha	6,109	48.50%	New
Independent	Fugro Narayan Shrinivass	5,727	45.47%	New
Independent	Katariya Mohanlal Kanji	311	2.47%	New
Margin of victory		382	3.03%	▼9.72
Turnout		12,595	72.03%	▲0.76
Registered electors		16,863		▲13.62
INC gain from MGP		Swing	▼6.47	

=== Assembly Election 1980 ===
1980 Goa, Daman and Diu Legislative Assembly election : Diu
Party	Candidate	Votes	%	±%
MGP	Solanki Somji Bhikha	6,032	54.98%	▲19.57
Independent	Fugro Narayan Shrinivas	4,633	42.23%	New
Margin of victory		1,399	12.75%	▼6.68
Turnout		10,972	71.86%	▲1.13
Registered electors		14,842		▲7.29
MGP gain from Independent		Swing	▲0.14	

=== Assembly Election 1977 ===
1977 Goa, Daman and Diu Legislative Assembly election : Diu
Party	Candidate	Votes	%	±%
Independent	Fugro Narayan Shrinivas	5,522	54.84%	New
MGP	Modasia Balubhai Dharsi	3,565	35.40%	New
JP	Bamania Ratila Bhiknabhai	702	6.97%	New
Margin of victory		1,957	19.43%	▲4.36
Turnout		10,070	70.76%	▼0.40
Registered electors		13,834		▲19.25
Independent hold		Swing		

=== Assembly Election 1972 ===
1972 Goa, Daman and Diu Legislative Assembly election : Diu
Party	Candidate	Votes	%	±%
Independent	Fordo Narayan Shrinivas	4,598	54.15%	New
INC	Modasia Balubhai Dharsi	3,318	39.08%	New
Margin of victory		1,280	15.07%	▲14.33
Turnout		8,491	68.24%	▲3.76
Registered electors		11,601		▲17.03
Independent hold		Swing		

=== Assembly Election 1967 ===
1967 Goa, Daman and Diu Legislative Assembly election : Diu
Party	Candidate	Votes	%	±%
Independent	F. N. Srinivassa	1,552	22.55%	New
Independent	A. R. Hadmat	1,501	21.81%	New
Independent	J. M. Ravji	1,479	21.49%	New
PSP	B. R. Bhikhabhai	1,407	20.44%	New
UGP	P. R. Devshanker	356	5.17%	New
Independent	K. V. Sakar	142	2.06%	New
Independent	B. L. Jetha	138	2.00%	New
Margin of victory		51	0.74%	
Turnout		6,883	66.33%	
Registered electors		9,913		
Independent win (new seat)				
