= Rivona Assembly constituency =

Former constituency of the Goa Legislative Assembly, India

Coordinates: 15.152°N 74.105°E

Rivona
- Former constituency for the Goa Legislative Assembly

Constituency details
- Country: India
- Region: Western India
- State: Goa
- District: South Goa
- Lok Sabha constituency: South Goa
- Established: 1977
- Abolished: 1984
- Total electors: 16,049
- Reservation: None

Rivona was one of the 30 Goa Legislative Assembly constituencies of the state of Goa in southern India. Rivona was also one of the constituencies falling under South Goa Lok Sabha constituency.

== Members of Goa Legislative Assembly ==
Year	Member	Party
1977	Dilkhush Desai	Maharashtrawadi Gomantak Party
1980	Dilkhush Desai	Indian National Congress
1984	Prakash Velip	Maharashtrawadi Gomantak Party

== Election results ==
=== Assembly Election 1984 ===
1984 Goa, Daman and Diu Legislative Assembly election : Rivona
Party	Candidate	Votes	%	±%
MGP	Prakash Velip	4,644	38.85%	▲3.07
INC	Phal Dessai Sahnkar	3,685	30.83%	New
Independent	Fal Dessai Dinanath Purshotam	1,910	15.98%	New
BJP	Sawant Dessai Raghoba Pokko	660	5.52%	New
Independent	Gaonkar Gurguro Gurko	622	5.20%	New
Margin of victory		959	8.02%	▲3.36
Turnout		11,953	71.79%	▲2.15
Registered electors		16,049		▲13.63
MGP gain from INC(U)		Swing	▼1.59	

=== Assembly Election 1980 ===
1980 Goa, Daman and Diu Legislative Assembly election : Rivona
Party	Candidate	Votes	%	±%
INC(U)	Dessai Dilkush Fettu	4,132	40.45%	New
MGP	Velip Jiva Kusta	3,656	35.79%	▼3.34
Independent	Velip Chandrakant Devu	1,493	14.61%	New
JP	Panchwadkaer Mukund Ganesh	508	4.97%	▼2.04
Margin of victory		476	4.66%	▼7.52
Turnout		10,216	69.31%	▲5.07
Registered electors		14,124		▲8.00
INC(U) gain from MGP		Swing	▲1.31	

=== Assembly Election 1977 ===
1977 Goa, Daman and Diu Legislative Assembly election : Rivona
Party	Candidate	Votes	%	±%
MGP	Dessai Dilkush Fettu	3,442	39.13%	New
INC	Desai Molu Ganaba	2,371	26.96%	New
Independent	Velip Chandrakant Devu	1,932	21.96%	New
JP	Dessai Sushema Shaba	617	7.01%	New
Independent	Kurtikar Dulo Chimlo	190	2.16%	New
Margin of victory		1,071	12.18%	
Turnout		8,796	65.39%	
Registered electors		13,078		
MGP win (new seat)				
