= Daman Assembly constituency =

Constituency of the Goa legislative assembly in India

Daman
- Former constituency for the Goa Legislative Assembly

Constituency details
- Country: India
- Region: Western India
- State: Goa
- Established: 1967
- Abolished: 1989
- Total electors: 25,296

Daman Assembly constituency was an assembly constituency in the India state of Goa.

== Members of the Legislative Assembly ==
Election	Member	Party
1967	M. M. Bhathala	Independent politician
1972	H. Vallabhabhai Tendel	Indian National Congress
1977	Bhathela Makanbhai Morarji	Independent politician
1980	Tandel Narsinhbai Lallubhai	Maharashtrawadi Gomantak Party
1984	Prabhakar Jivanbhai Somabhai	Independent politician

== Election results ==
=== Assembly Election 1984 ===
1984 Goa, Daman and Diu Legislative Assembly election : Daman
Party	Candidate	Votes	%	±%
Independent	Prabhakar Jivanbhai Somabhai	5,316	28.10	New
Independent	Patel Dahyabhai Vallabhabhai	3,451	18.24	New
Independent	Mhawla Gulamhusein Ramzan	2,966	15.68	New
Independent	Lopes Mari Francisco	2,441	12.90	New
INC	Tandel Narsinhbhai Lallubhai	1,882	9.95	New
Independent	Bhathela Makanbhai Morarji	605	3.20	New
BJP	Paetel Dayalbhai Lallubhai	545	2.88	New
Margin of victory		1,865	9.86	▼7.69
Turnout		18,921	70.90	▲7.07
Registered electors		25,296		▲13.68
Independent gain from MGP		Swing	▼15.79	

=== Assembly Election 1980 ===
1980 Goa, Daman and Diu Legislative Assembly election : Daman
Party	Candidate	Votes	%	±%
MGP	Tandel Narsinhbai Lallubhai	6,613	43.88	New
Independent	Mhawla Gulamhusein Ramzan	3,968	26.33	New
Independent	Bhathela Makanbhai Morarji	2,127	14.11	New
INC(I)	Bhatia R. C.	951	6.31	New
Independent	Moraes Sousa Jose	211	1.40	New
Independent	Kalawadwala Akabarali Lookmanji	144	0.96	New
Independent	Parmer Chandrakant Devchand	130	0.86	New
Margin of victory		2,645	17.55	▲17.40
Turnout		15,070	63.57	▼2.09
Registered electors		22,251		▲7.81
MGP gain from Independent		Swing	▼0.69	

=== Assembly Election 1977 ===
1977 Goa, Daman and Diu Legislative Assembly election : Daman
Party	Candidate	Votes	%	±%
Independent	Bhathela Makanbhai Morarji	6,423	44.57	New
JP	Bhathela Dajibhai Kanjibhai	6,401	44.42	New
Independent	Moraise Souza Jose	545	3.78	New
Independent	Mhawala Gulamhusein Ramzenbhai	305	2.12	New
Independent	Vagmar Abdulgafur Ahmed	161	1.12	New
Independent	Bhatia R. C.	153	1.06	New
Margin of victory		22	0.15	▼2.23
Turnout		14,411	67.99	▼16.08
Registered electors		20,640		▲11.54
Independent gain from INC		Swing	▼4.06	

=== Assembly Election 1972 ===
1972 Goa, Daman and Diu Legislative Assembly election : Daman
Party	Candidate	Votes	%	±%
INC	H. Vallabhabhai Tendel	7,729	48.63	New
Independent	Lallubhai Jogibhat Patel	7,350	46.24	New
Independent	Premabhai S Prabhakar	132	0.83	New
Margin of victory		379	2.38	▲0.00
Turnout		15,895	82.78	▲23.41
Registered electors		18,504		▲19.15
INC gain from Independent		Swing		

=== Assembly Election 1967 ===
1967 Goa, Daman and Diu Legislative Assembly election : Daman
Party	Candidate	Votes	%	±%
Independent	M. M. Bhathala	2,775	28.60	New
UGP	B. O. Pandya	2,544	26.22	New
Independent	M. R. Desai	2,394	24.67	New
Independent	G. R. Mhawla	1,007	10.38	New
Independent	K. B. Barot	622	6.41	New
Independent	S. M. Bhatt	72	0.74	New
Margin of victory		231	2.38	
Turnout		9,704	60.62	
Registered electors		15,530		
Independent win (new seat)				
