= Tivim Assembly constituency =

Legislative Assembly constituency in Goa State, India

Coordinates: 15.62°N 73.84°E

Tivim
- Constituency No. 4 for the Goa Legislative Assembly

Constituency details
- Country: India
- Region: Western India
- State: Goa
- District: North Goa
- Lok Sabha constituency: North Goa
- Established: 1963
- Total electors: 29,132
- Reservation: None

Member of Legislative Assembly
- 8th Goa Legislative Assembly
- Incumbent Nilkanth Halarnkar
- Party: Bharatiya Janata Party

Tivim Assembly constituency is one of the 40 Legislative Assembly constituencies of Goa state in India. Tivim is also one of the 20 constituencies falling under North Goa Lok Sabha constituency.

It is part of North Goa district.

== Members of Legislative Assembly ==
Year	Member	Party
1963	Shambu Palyekar	Maharashtrawadi Gomantak Party
1967	Jaisingrao Rane	Maharashtrawadi Gomantak Party
1972	Punaji Achrekar	Maharashtrawadi Gomantak Party
1977	Dayanand Narvekar	Maharashtrawadi Gomantak Party
1980	Dayanand Narvekar	Indian National Congress
1984	Dayanand Narvekar	Indian National Congress
1989	Vinayak Naiik	Maharashtrawadi Gomantak Party
1994	Dayanand Narvekar	Indian National Congress
1999	Dayanand Narvekar	Indian National Congress
2002	Sadanand Tanavade	Bharatiya Janata Party
2007	Nilkanth Halarnkar	Nationalist Congress Party
2012	Kiran Kandolkar	Bharatiya Janata Party
2017	Nilkanth Halarnkar	Indian National Congress
2017	Nilkanth Halarnkar	Bharatiya Janata Party
2022	Nilkanth Halarnkar	Bharatiya Janata Party

== Election results ==
=== 2027 Assembly election ===
2027 Goa Legislative Assembly election: Tivim
Party	Candidate	Votes	%	±%
INC				
NDA				
NOTA	None of the above			
Majority				
Turnout				
gain from		Swing		

=== Assembly Election 2022 ===
2022 Goa Legislative Assembly election : Tivim
Party	Candidate	Votes	%	±%
BJP	Nilkant Halarnkar	9,414	39.34%	▼6.33
AITC	Kavita Kandolkar	7,363	30.77%	New
RGP	Tukaram Bharat Parab	5,051	21.11%	New
INC	Aman Lotlikar	1,262	5.27%	▼43.92
AAP	Udai Salkar	421	1.76%	▼1.36
NOTA	None of the Above	202	0.84%	▲0.05
Margin of victory		2,051	8.57%	▲5.05
Turnout		23,929	82.16%	▼2.73
Registered electors		29,126		▲9.60
BJP gain from INC		Swing	▼9.86	

=== Assembly Election 2017 ===
2017 Goa Legislative Assembly election : Tivim
Party	Candidate	Votes	%	±%
INC	Nilkant Halarnkar	11,099	49.20%	New
BJP	Kiran Kandolkar	10,304	45.67%	▼5.88
AAP	Pradeep Amonkar Ghadi	703	3.12%	New
NCP	Douglas Lawrence Sequeira	275	1.22%	▼44.86
NOTA	None of the Above	179	0.79%	New
Margin of victory		795	3.52%	▼1.95
Turnout		22,560	84.89%	▼1.16
Registered electors		26,575		▲12.57
INC gain from BJP		Swing	▼2.36	

=== Assembly Election 2012 ===
2012 Goa Legislative Assembly election : Tivim
Party	Candidate	Votes	%	±%
BJP	Kiran Kandolkar	10,473	51.55%	▲8.82
NCP	Nilkant Halarnkar	9,361	46.08%	▲1.71
Goa Vikas Party	Deelip Datta Chodankar	204	1.00%	New
Independent	Indrakant Dattaram Korgaonkar	167	0.82%	New
Margin of victory		1,112	5.47%	▲3.83
Turnout		20,315	86.05%	▲13.57
Registered electors		23,607		▼13.41
BJP gain from NCP		Swing	▲7.18	

=== Assembly Election 2007 ===
2007 Goa Legislative Assembly election : Tivim
Party	Candidate	Votes	%	±%
NCP	Nilkant Halarnkar	8,768	44.37%	▲8.89
BJP	Sadanand Shet Tanavade	8,444	42.73%	▲4.38
Independent	Kandolkar Kiran	1,343	6.80%	New
Save Goa Front	Goveia Ludovico Sagrado	541	2.74%	New
MGP	Korgaonkar Indrakant Dattaram	198	1.00%	New
SS	Salgaonkar Umesh Madhukar	188	0.95%	▼0.86
Independent	Bepari Lala	173	0.88%	New
Margin of victory		324	1.64%	▼1.23
Turnout		19,761	72.48%	▲1.50
Registered electors		27,262		▲6.62
NCP gain from BJP		Swing	▲6.02	

=== Assembly Election 2002 ===
2002 Goa Legislative Assembly election : Tivim
Party	Candidate	Votes	%	±%
BJP	Sadanand Shet Tanavade	6,961	38.35%	▲22.04
NCP	Nilkanth Ramnath Halarnkar	6,440	35.48%	New
INC	Maulingkar Premnath Arjun	4,408	24.29%	▼16.88
SS	Korgaokar Indrakant Dattaram	328	1.81%	New
Margin of victory		521	2.87%	▼12.77
Turnout		18,150	70.93%	▲3.53
Registered electors		25,570		▲1.58
BJP gain from INC		Swing	▼2.81	

=== Assembly Election 1999 ===
1999 Goa Legislative Assembly election : Tivim
Party	Candidate	Votes	%	±%
INC	Dayanand Narvekar	6,989	41.17%	▼27.98
Goa Rajiv Congress Party	Halarnkar Nilkant Ramnath	4,333	25.52%	New
BJP	Sadanand Shet Tanavade	2,769	16.31%	New
MGP	Fadte Kamalkant Surya	2,066	12.17%	New
Independent	Pereira Sebastiao Christopher	817	4.81%	New
Margin of victory		2,656	15.64%	▼31.03
Turnout		16,978	67.43%	▼4.19
Registered electors		25,172		▲10.36
INC hold		Swing	▼27.98	

=== Assembly Election 1994 ===
1994 Goa Legislative Assembly election : Tivim
Party	Candidate	Votes	%	±%
INC	Dayanand Narvekar	11,299	69.15%	New
MGP	Naik Vinayak Vithal	3,672	22.47%	
Independent	Raikar Kalidas Kashinath	954	5.84%	New
Margin of victory		7,627	46.68%	▲32.71
Turnout		16,340	70.71%	▼1.44
Registered electors		22,810		▲14.53
INC gain from MGP		Swing		

=== Assembly Election 1989 ===
1989 Goa Legislative Assembly election : Tivim
Party	Candidate	Votes	%	±%
MGP	Naik Vinayak Vitthal	6,797	46.70%	New
INC	Maulingkar Premnath Arjun	4,764	32.73%	
Independent	Halarnakar Nikant Pundalik	1,877	12.90%	New
Independent	Harmalkar Sanjay Pundalik	284	1.95%	New
SS	Naik Suhas Baburao	116	0.80%	New
Margin of victory		2,033	13.97%	▼7.66
Turnout		14,554	70.83%	▲1.47
Registered electors		19,917		▼10.74
MGP gain from INC		Swing	▼2.48	

=== Assembly Election 1984 ===
1984 Goa, Daman and Diu Legislative Assembly election : Tivim
Party	Candidate	Votes	%	±%
INC	Dayanand Narvekar	7,858	49.19%	New
Independent	Alvares Gabriel Felix	4,402	27.55%	New
MGP	Pole Pandarinath Vaman	2,913	18.23%	New
BJP	D'Souza Jacinto Cajetano	157	1.08%	New
Independent	Bandodkar Sitaram Ramnath	146	1.00%	New
Margin of victory		3,456	21.63%	▼5.64
Turnout		15,976	70.09%	▲1.09
Registered electors		22,313		▲12.76
INC gain from INC(U)		Swing	▼9.72	

=== Assembly Election 1980 ===
1980 Goa, Daman and Diu Legislative Assembly election : Tivim
Party	Candidate	Votes	%	±%
INC(U)	Dayanand Narvekar	8,219	58.91%	New
MGP	Chodankar Madan Varnan	4,414	31.64%	
JP	Govenkar Lakshiman Dattaram	346	2.48%	New
Independent	Fernandes Albin Santana	154	1.10%	New
Independent	Lotlikar Suresh Madhukar	120	0.86%	New
Independent	Bhonsle Jaganath Dharam	97	0.70%	New
Margin of victory		3,805	27.27%	▲23.08
Turnout		13,952	67.62%	▲8.38
Registered electors		19,788		▲11.43
INC(U) gain from MGP		Swing	▲17.61	

=== Assembly Election 1977 ===
1977 Goa, Daman and Diu Legislative Assembly election : Tivim
Party	Candidate	Votes	%	±%
MGP	Dayanand Narvekar	4,557	41.30%	▼14.65
JP	Rinbeeio Malvina Leoner Pinto Rangel	4,094	37.10%	New
INC	Souza Silverio Jose	2,226	20.17%	New
Margin of victory		463	4.20%	▼27.25
Turnout		11,034	61.25%	▼11.61
Registered electors		17,759		▲35.95
MGP hold		Swing	▼14.65	

=== Assembly Election 1972 ===
1972 Goa, Daman and Diu Legislative Assembly election : Tivim
Party	Candidate	Votes	%	±%
MGP	Punaji Pandurang Achrekar	5,390	55.95%	▼1.64
INC	Gopal Govind Mayekar	2,361	24.51%	New
UGP	Prabhu R. Purushottam	1,457	15.13%	New
ABJS	Gad Madhukar Sakharam	142	1.47%	New
Margin of victory		3,029	31.44%	▼4.45
Turnout		9,633	71.58%	▲5.78
Registered electors		13,063		▲7.39
MGP hold		Swing	▼1.64	

=== Assembly Election 1967 ===
1967 Goa, Daman and Diu Legislative Assembly election : Tivim
Party	Candidate	Votes	%	±%
MGP	Jaisingrao Rane	4,761	57.59%	New
UGP	N. Narayananant	1,794	21.70%	New
Independent	B. Mahadev	869	10.51%	New
PSP	S. M. Walhekar	172	2.08%	New
Independent	L. F. Albino	119	1.44%	New
Independent	D. Z. P. Mariand	34	0.41%	New
Independent	P. S. Nagesh	23	0.28%	New
Margin of victory		2,967	35.89%	
Turnout		8,267	63.89%	
Registered electors		12,164		
MGP win (new seat)				
