= Mahadev Naik =

Indian politician

Minister of Industries Handicrafts Textile & Coir Social Welfare Co-operation in the Goa Government
- In office 2012–2017

Member of the Goa Legislative Assembly
- In office 2007–2017

Personal details
- Party: Aam Aadmi Party
- Occupation: Politician

Mahadev Naik is an Indian politician. He was a MLA from the Shiroda, Goa, constituency.

He was Bharatiya Janata Party Minister in the Parsekar-led Government.

== Ministry ==
Naik was a Minister in the Laxmikant Parsekar-led government in Goa. He lost the Siroda Assembly constituency in the 2017 Goa Legislative Assembly election. Naik joined Aam Aadmi Party in August 2021.

== Portfolios ==
In the Parsekar-led cabinet, Naik held the charge of:

- Industries
- Textile & coir
- Social welfare
- Co-operation
- Handicrafts

== Controversy ==
In July 2015, opposition party Indian National Congress alleged that Naik was involved in a housing loan scam.
