= 1972 Goa, Daman and Diu Legislative Assembly election =

Election in Indian state

- 1972

All 30 assembly constituencies 16 seats needed for a majority
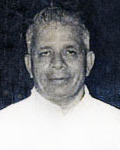
	Majority party	Minority party
		UGP
Leader	Dayanand Bandodkar	Jack Sequeira
Party	MGP	UGP
Leader's seat	Marcaim Assembly constituency	St. Cruz
Seats before	16	12
Seats won	18	10
Seat change	▲2	▼2
Chief Minister before election
Dayanand Bandodkar
MGP
Elected Chief Minister
Dayanand Bandodkar
MGP

Goa, Daman & Diu Legislative Assembly election, 1972 was held in Indian Union territory of Goa, Daman and Diu in 1972, to elect 30 members to the Goa, Daman & Diu Legislative Assembly.

== Results ==
Summary of results of the Goa, Daman & Diu Legislative Assembly election, 1972
Political Party	Seats contested	Seats won	Number of Votes	% of Votes	Seat change
Maharashtrawadi Gomantak Party	23	18	116,855	38.30%	▲2
United Goans Party (Sequeira Group)	26	10	99,156	32.50%	▼2
Indian National Congress	19	1	41,612	13.64%	▲1
Independents	36	1	28,874	9.64%	▼1
Total	138	30	305,077		

=== Results by constituency ===
Winner, runner-up, voter turnout, and victory margin in every constituency
Assembly Constituency		Turnout	Winner				Runner Up				Margin
#k	Names	%	Candidate	Party	Votes	%	Candidate	Party	Votes	%	Margin
1	Pernem	71.93%	Rane Jaisingrao Abasaheb	MGP	5,477	61.66%	Deshprabhu Raghunathrao	INC	2,828	31.84%	2,649
2	Mandrem	71.27%	Dayanand Bandodkar	MGP	8,254	72.93%	Kamulkar Vijay Maruti	INC	2,006	17.72%	6,248
3	Siolim	75.6%	Chandrakant Chodankar	MGP	5,638	51.37%	S. Souzaw A. Tito Fermina	UGP	4,789	43.64%	849
4	Calangute	73.36%	Jagdish Bhujang Rao	UGP	6,032	51.02%	D. Cruz Anthony Manuel	MGP	5,425	45.89%	607
5	Aldona	58.14%	José Silveiro Sousa	UGP	5,733	64.06%	Silver Anacleto Mariand	Independent	1,953	21.82%	3,780
6	Mapusa	73.82%	Pankar Raghuvir Shanu	MGP	5,718	48.97%	N. S. Pandurang	UGP	3,532	30.25%	2,186
7	Tivim	71.58%	Punaji Pandurang Achrekar	MGP	5,390	57.65%	Gopal Govind Mayekar	INC	2,361	25.25%	3,029
8	Bicholim	80.04%	Shashikala Kakodkar	MGP	6,589	65.42%	S. Ramesh Narayan	INC	2,393	23.76%	4,196
9	Pale	73.92%	A. K. S. Usgaonkar	MGP	4,885	51.19%	S. U. Prabhakar Krishna	INC	2,706	28.36%	2,179
10	Sattari	67.61%	Pratapsingh Rane	MGP	5,005	51.81%	Jaisingrao Rane	SSP	2,322	24.04%	2,683
11	Panaji	67.67%	Baban Naik	MGP	3,983	42.73%	Desai Yeshwant Sitaram	UGP	3,758	40.32%	225
12	St. Cruz	69.28%	Jack de Sequeira	UGP	6,586	57.51%	Fernandes Manuel Francisco Xavier Diogo	Independent	4,483	39.15%	2,103
13	St. Andre	72.28%	Teotonio Pereira	UGP	5,335	50.44%	Melo Agosttinho Santana	MGP	3,969	37.52%	1,366
14	Cumbarjua	72.28%	Chodankar Vinayak Dharma	MGP	5,956	54.49%	P. P. Desai Shrikant Govind	UGP	3,530	32.3%	2,426
15	Marcaim	74.34%	Bandodkar Krishna Raghu	MGP	7,020	77.19%	Kerkar Chandrakant Vijaya	MGP	1,858	20.43%	5,162
16	Ponda	73.4%	Rhoidas Naik	MGP	6,052	58.3%	Vishwanath Yeshwant Naik	MGP	2,259	21.76%	3,793
17	Siroda	65.59%	Jayakrishna Putu Naik	MGP	5,908	60.26%	Tendolkar N Narahari	UGP	1,425	14.53%	4,483
18	Sanguem	69.54%	Morajker Vassudeu Datta	MGP	4,580	51.73%	K. Devidas Pandurang	INC	1,989	22.46%	2,591
19	Canacona	70.97%	Ganaba Bhagdu Desai	MGP	5,874	55.37%	P. D. Shrirang Padmanaba	UGP	3,441	32.43%	2,433
20	Quepem	65.27%	Dhulo Kuttikar	MGP	3,406	46.16%	Dessai Molu Ganba	UGP	2,815	38.15%	591
21	Curchorem	66.18%	Anil Prabhu Dessai	MGP	4,055	42.42%	Karmali B. Gopinath	UGP	2,965	31.01%	1,090
22	Cuncolim	64.27%	Roque Santana Fernandes	UGP	5,337	58.44%	Fernandes A. J. Guilman	MGP	3,133	34.31%	2,204
23	Benaulim	60.3%	Vasudeo Narayan Sarmalkar	UGP	6,604	76.87%	Cardoso Felicio	Independent	1,796	20.91%	4,808
24	Navelim	57.07%	Leo Velho Mauricio	UGP	7,618	69.77%	Miranda Elu Jose	MGP	2,777	25.43%	4,841
25	Margao	65.51%	Ananta Narcinva Naik	UGP	4,859	54.05%	Virginkar Gopal Naraina	MGP	2,469	27.46%	2,390
26	Curtorim	58.73%	F. E. S. Silveira Martinho	UGP	7,120	68.16%	Cardozoi Luis Piedade	Independent	2,039	19.52%	5,081
27	Cortalim	57.58%	Barbosa Luis Paleixo	UGP	7,431	77.79%	Telo Mascarenhas	INC	1,018	10.66%	6,413
28	Mormugao	50.08%	Joshi Vassant Subraya	MGP	5,292	37.79%	A L De Graca Antonio	UGP	4,252	30.36%	1,040
29	Daman	82.78%	H. Vallabhabhai Tendel	INC	7,729	50.46%	Lallubhai Jogibhat Patel	Independent	7,350	47.99%	379
30	Diu	68.24%	Fordo Narayan Shrinivas	Independent	4,598	58.08%	Modasia Balubhai Dharsi	INC	3,318	41.92%	1,280

== By Elections ==
No.	Constituency	Winner	Party
1	Mandrem	Ramakant Khalap	Maharashtrawadi Gomantak Party
2	Benaulim	Wilfred de Souza	United Goans Party (Sequeira group)
