= Curtorim Assembly constituency =

Legislative Assembly constituency in Goa State, India

Coordinates: 15.29°N 74.03°E

Curtorim
- Constituency No. 29 for the Goa Legislative Assembly

Constituency details
- Country: India
- Region: Western India
- State: Goa
- District: South Goa
- Lok Sabha constituency: South Goa
- Established: 1963
- Total electors: 29,850
- Reservation: None

Member of Legislative Assembly
- 8th Goa Legislative Assembly
- Incumbent Aleixo Lourenco
- Party: Independent
- Alliance: National Democratic Alliance

Curtorim Assembly constituency is one of the 40 Goa Legislative Assembly constituencies of the state of Goa in southern India. Curtorim is also one of the 20 constituencies falling under South Goa Lok Sabha constituency.

== Members of the Legislative Assembly ==
Year	Member	Party
1963	Enio Pimenta	United Goans Party
1967	Barretto Roque Joaquim	United Goans Party
1972	Eduardo Faleiro	United Goans Party
1977	Francisco Sardinha	Indian National Congress
1980	Francisco Sardinha	Indian National Congress
1984	Francisco Sardinha	Indian National Congress
1989	Francisco Sardinha	Indian National Congress
1994	Gaonkar Antonio Damiao	United Goans Democratic Party
1999	Francisco Sardinha	Indian National Congress
2002	Francisco Sardinha	Indian National Congress
2007	Aleixo Lourenco	Save Goa Front
2012	Aleixo Lourenco	Indian National Congress
2017	Aleixo Lourenco	Indian National Congress
2022	Aleixo Lourenco	Independent politician

== Election results ==
=== 2027 Assembly election ===
2027 Goa Legislative Assembly election: Curtorim
Party	Candidate	Votes	%	±%
INC				
NDA				
NOTA	None of the above			
Majority				
Turnout				
gain from		Swing		

=== Assembly Election 2022 ===
2022 Goa Legislative Assembly election : Curtorim
Party	Candidate	Votes	%	±%
Independent	Reginaldo Lourenco	8,960	39.98	New
INC	Moreno Rebelo	3,905	17.43	▼42.85
RGP	Rubert Pereira	3,479	15.53	New
AAP	Domingo Gaunkar (Domnic)	2,793	12.46	▼0.26
BJP	Anthony Barbosa	2,385	10.64	▼13.50
AITC	Anthony Alberto Peixoto	353	1.58	New
NOTA	None of the Above	232	1.04	▼0.13
Margin of victory		5,055	22.56	▼13.57
Turnout		22,409	74.04	▼0.51
Registered electors		29,850		▲5.90
Independent gain from INC		Swing	▼20.29	

=== Assembly Election 2017 ===
2017 Goa Legislative Assembly election : Curtorim
Party	Candidate	Votes	%	±%
INC	Reginaldo Lourenco	12,841	60.28	▲3.19
BJP	Arthur D'Silva	5,144	24.15	New
AAP	Edwin Domnic Vaz	2,711	12.73	New
NOTA	None of the Above	249	1.17	New
MGP	Conceicao Dias	240	1.13	New
Margin of victory		7,697	36.13	▲15.43
Turnout		21,303	75.58	▲0.76
Registered electors		28,187		▲7.29
INC hold		Swing	▲3.19	

=== Assembly Election 2012 ===
2012 Goa Legislative Assembly election : Curtorim
Party	Candidate	Votes	%	±%
INC	Reginaldo Lourenco	11,221	57.09	▲13.61
Independent	Domnic Gaonkar	7,152	36.39	New
Independent	Raju Krishnamurthy Iyer	603	3.07	New
UGDP	Conceicao Santano Dias	515	2.62	New
JD(U)	William D'Cruz	156	0.79	New
Margin of victory		4,069	20.70	▲10.10
Turnout		19,656	74.79	▲9.92
Registered electors		26,271		▼1.06
INC gain from Save Goa Front		Swing	▲3.00	

=== Assembly Election 2007 ===
2007 Goa Legislative Assembly election : Curtorim
Party	Candidate	Votes	%	±%
Save Goa Front	Reginaldo Lourenco	9,320	54.08	New
INC	Sardinha Cosme Francisco Caitano	7,493	43.48	▼12.88
Independent	Xavier Dias	390	2.26	New
Margin of victory		1,827	10.60	▼7.44
Turnout		17,233	64.79	▼1.23
Registered electors		26,552		▲11.11
Save Goa Front gain from INC		Swing		

=== Assembly Election 2002 ===
2002 Goa Legislative Assembly election : Curtorim
Party	Candidate	Votes	%	±%
INC	Francisco Sardinha	8,907	56.36	▼27.28
Independent	Lourenco Bruno Santos	6,056	38.32	New
BJP	Amonkar Mahesh Shankar	535	3.39	▼2.98
Independent	Oliveira Caitano Rusario	302	1.91	New
Margin of victory		2,851	18.04	▼55.63
Turnout		15,804	66.12	▲7.12
Registered electors		23,896		▲8.78
INC hold		Swing	▼27.28	

=== Assembly Election 1999 ===
1999 Goa Legislative Assembly election : Curtorim
Party	Candidate	Votes	%	±%
INC	Francisco Sardinha	10,843	83.64	New
Independent	Gaunkar Antonio Damiao	1,293	9.97	New
BJP	Sawant Sanjeev Laxman	825	6.36	New
Margin of victory		9,550	73.67	▲72.99
Turnout		12,964	59.00	▼12.35
Registered electors		21,967		▲13.18
INC gain from UGDP		Swing		

=== Assembly Election 1994 ===
1994 Goa Legislative Assembly election : Curtorim
Party	Candidate	Votes	%	±%
UGDP	Gaonkar Antonio Damiao	6,564	47.39	New
INC	Sardinha Cosmofrancisco Gaetano	6,470	46.71	
BSP	Vaz Joseph Francisco	338	2.44	New
Independent	Dias Conceicao Santano	89	0.64	New
MGP	Amonkar Vilas Chandrakant	84	0.61	New
Margin of victory		94	0.68	▼36.46
Turnout		13,851	70.23	▲0.02
Registered electors		19,409		▲4.09
UGDP gain from INC		Swing	▼19.34	

=== Assembly Election 1989 ===
1989 Goa Legislative Assembly election : Curtorim
Party	Candidate	Votes	%	±%
INC	Francisco Sardinha	8,876	66.73	▼1.37
JD	Barbosa Agostinho Sevastiao	3,936	29.59	New
Independent	Rodrigues Joaquim Filomena	105	0.79	New
Margin of victory		4,940	37.14	▼3.67
Turnout		13,302	69.49	▲3.21
Registered electors		18,646		▼8.49
INC hold		Swing		

=== Assembly Election 1984 ===
1984 Goa, Daman and Diu Legislative Assembly election : Curtorim
Party	Candidate	Votes	%	±%
INC	Francisco Sardinha	9,452	68.09	New
Independent	Dias Inacio Caetano Marcelino	3,787	27.28	New
Independent	Gomes J. Paulo	127	0.91	New
MGP	Lotlikar Somnath Yeshwant	120	0.90	New
Margin of victory		5,665	40.81	▼2.14
Turnout		13,881	66.40	▲5.90
Registered electors		20,375		▲12.13
INC gain from INC(U)		Swing	▲2.49	

=== Assembly Election 1980 ===
1980 Goa, Daman and Diu Legislative Assembly election : Curtorim
Party	Candidate	Votes	%	±%
INC(U)	Francisco Sardinha	7,418	65.60	New
MGP	Costa Sebastao Vicente	2,561	22.65	New
Independent	Barbose Norman Rondolencio	412	3.64	New
JP(S)	Costa Cajentan Peter Rosario	295	2.61	New
Independent	Anteo Johny Jose Antonio R.	155	1.37	New
Independent	D. Costa Joseph Caitan	115	1.02	New
Margin of victory		4,857	42.95	▲31.03
Turnout		11,308	60.29	▲7.88
Registered electors		18,171		▲4.43
INC(U) gain from INC		Swing	▲23.89	

=== Assembly Election 1977 ===
1977 Goa, Daman and Diu Legislative Assembly election : Curtorim
Party	Candidate	Votes	%	±%
INC	Francisco Sardinha	3,945	41.71	New
JP	Aguiar Manuel Sebastiao	2,817	29.78	New
MGP	Souza Pedro A. Francisco	2,129	22.51	New
Independent	Viegas Antonio Des Ramedios Simplicio	384	4.06	New
Margin of victory		1,128	11.93	▼35.87
Turnout		9,458	53.59	▼5.42
Registered electors		17,401		▼2.16
INC gain from UGP		Swing	▼25.27	

=== Assembly Election 1972 ===
1972 Goa, Daman and Diu Legislative Assembly election : Curtorim
Party	Candidate	Votes	%	±%
UGP	F. E. S. Silveira Martinho	7,120	66.98	▼17.21
Independent	Cardozoi Luis Piedade	2,039	19.18	New
Independent	Banneto Roque Santana	1,195	11.24	New
Independent	Fernandes Joao Filipe	92	0.87	New
Margin of victory		5,081	47.80	▼31.05
Turnout		10,630	58.73	▼1.60
Registered electors		17,785		▲4.68
UGP hold		Swing	▼17.21	

=== Assembly Election 1967 ===
1967 Goa, Daman and Diu Legislative Assembly election : Curtorim
Party	Candidate	Votes	%	±%
UGP	Barretto Roque Joaquim	8,778	84.19	New
Independent	C. A. M. Jose	556	5.33	New
Independent	C. J. Joao	337	3.23	New
United Goans Party (Furtado Group)	E. Pimenta	200	1.92	New
Independent	L. J. H. Antona	183	1.76	New
Independent	A. R. Estibeiro	107	1.03	New
Margin of victory		8,222	78.85	
Turnout		10,427	59.81	
Registered electors		16,990		
UGP win (new seat)				

== See also ==
- List of constituencies of the Goa Legislative Assembly
- South Goa district
