= St. Andre Assembly constituency =

Legislative Assembly constituency in Goa State, India

Coordinates: 15.42°N 73.95°E

St. Andre
- Constituency No. 14 for the Goa Legislative Assembly

Constituency details
- Country: India
- Region: Western India
- State: Goa
- District: North Goa
- Lok Sabha constituency: North Goa
- Established: 1963
- Reservation: None

Member of Legislative Assembly
- 8th Goa Legislative Assembly
- Incumbent Viresh Borkar
- Party: Revolutionary Goans Party

St. Andre Assembly constituency is one of the 40 Goa Legislative Assembly constituencies of the state of Goa in southern India. St. Andre is also one of the 20 constituencies falling under North Goa Lok Sabha constituency.

== Members of Legislative Assembly ==
Year	Member	Party
1963	Teotonio Pereira	United Goans Party
1967	Teotonio Pereira	United Goans Party
1972	Teotonio Pereira	United Goans Party
1977	Shripad Cuncolienkar	Indian National Congress
1980	Teotonio Pereira	Indian National Congress
1984	Shripad Cuncolienkar	Indian National Congress
1989	Carmo Pegado	Independent
1994	Carmo Pegado	Indian National Congress
1999	Francisco Silveira	Indian National Congress
2002	Francisco Silveira	Indian National Congress
2007	Francisco Silveira	Indian National Congress
2012	Vishnu Wagh	Bharatiya Janata Party
2017	Francisco Silveira	Indian National Congress
2022	Viresh Borkar	Revolutionary Goans Party

== Election results ==
=== 2027 Assembly election ===
2027 Goa Legislative Assembly election: Mandrem
Party	Candidate	Votes	%	±%
RGP				
NDA				
NOTA	None of the above			
Majority				
Turnout				
gain from		Swing		

=== Assembly Election 2022 ===
2022 Goa Legislative Assembly election : St. Andre
Party	Candidate	Votes	%	±%
RGP	Viresh Borkar	5,395	33.14%	New
BJP	Francisco Silveira	5,319	32.67%	▲14.45
INC	Anthony Lino Fernandes	2,695	16.56%	▼32.30
AITC	Jagdish Umakant Bhobe	1,261	7.75%	New
AAP	Ramrao Surya Naik Wagh	1,122	6.89%	▲0.98
Independent	Rama Kankonkar	219	1.35%	New
NOTA	None of the Above	137	0.84%	▼0.08
NCP	Estevan Elvis D'Souza	131	0.80%	▼1.16
Margin of victory		76	0.47%	▼30.16
Turnout		16,279	76.00%	▼3.02
Registered electors		21,419		▲2.25
RGP gain from INC		Swing	▼15.71	

=== Assembly Election 2017 ===
2017 Goa Legislative Assembly election : St. Andre
Party	Candidate	Votes	%	±%
INC	Francisco Silveira	8,087	48.85%	▲4.74
BJP	Ramrao Surya Naik Wagh	3,017	18.23%	▼32.96
MGP	Jagdish Umakant Bhobe	2,393	14.46%	New
Independent	Dhaku Arjun Madkaikar	1,285	7.76%	New
AAP	Rama Gurudas Kankonkar	979	5.91%	New
NCP	Dattaram Naguesh Chari	325	1.96%	New
NOTA	None of the Above	152	0.92%	New
Independent	Simao Aleixo Caiado	143	0.86%	New
Margin of victory		5,070	30.63%	▲23.55
Turnout		16,554	79.02%	▼1.71
Registered electors		20,948		▼1.83
INC gain from BJP		Swing	▼2.33	

=== Assembly Election 2012 ===
2012 Goa Legislative Assembly election : St. Andre
Party	Candidate	Votes	%	±%
BJP	Vishnu Wagh	8,818	51.18%	▲11.36
INC	Francisco Silveira	7,599	44.11%	▼12.23
Independent	Pradip Kumar Sangodkar	440	2.55%	New
AITC	Milton S. Marshal	352	2.04%	New
Margin of victory		1,219	7.08%	▼9.44
Turnout		17,228	80.65%	▲12.02
Registered electors		21,338		▼3.87
BJP gain from INC		Swing	▼5.15	

=== Assembly Election 2007 ===
2007 Goa Legislative Assembly election : St. Andre
Party	Candidate	Votes	%	±%
INC	Francisco Silveira	8,593	56.34%	▲11.75
BJP	Caiado Antonio Joao	6,074	39.82%	▲13.91
MGP	Dessai Dongrikar Dilip	286	1.88%	New
JD(S)	Caiado Simon	283	1.86%	New
Margin of victory		2,519	16.51%	▼1.28
Turnout		15,253	68.64%	▼1.80
Registered electors		22,197		▼0.05
INC hold		Swing	▲11.75	

=== Assembly Election 2002 ===
2002 Goa Legislative Assembly election : St. Andre
Party	Candidate	Votes	%	±%
INC	Francisco Silveira	6,982	44.59%	▼0.85
NCP	Pegado Carmo Rafael Andre Jose	4,196	26.80%	New
BJP	Kamat Dhakankar Avinash Govind	4,057	25.91%	▼2.17
SS	Sawant Prakash Mahadev	212	1.35%	New
UGDP	Pereira Teotonio Paulo	207	1.32%	New
Margin of victory		2,786	17.79%	▲0.44
Turnout		15,659	70.49%	▼1.65
Registered electors		22,207		▲2.84
INC hold		Swing	▼0.85	

=== Assembly Election 1999 ===
1999 Goa Legislative Assembly election : St. Andre
Party	Candidate	Votes	%	±%
INC	Francisco Silveira	7,080	45.43%	▲1.43
BJP	Kamat Dhakankar Avinash Govind	4,376	28.08%	New
Goa Rajiv Congress Party	Pegado Carmo Rafael	4,106	26.35%	New
Margin of victory		2,704	17.35%	▲1.09
Turnout		15,583	72.07%	▲0.22
Registered electors		21,593		▲6.27
INC hold		Swing		

=== Assembly Election 1994 ===
1994 Goa Legislative Assembly election : St. Andre
Party	Candidate	Votes	%	±%
INC	Pegado Carmo Rafael	6,433	44.00%	New
BJP	Parvatkar Govind Bhikaji	4,056	27.74%	New
UGDP	Caiado Simao Lowrence	2,725	18.64%	New
Independent	Naik Keshavnath Shantaram	320	2.19%	New
Gomantak Lok Pox	Borkar Dilip Dharma	219	1.50%	New
Independent	Pereira Teotonio Paulo	196	1.34%	New
BSP	Mangeshkar Rohidas Narayan	153	1.05%	New
Margin of victory		2,377	16.26%	▲5.68
Turnout		14,619	70.44%	▼0.77
Registered electors		20,319		▲14.05
INC gain from Independent		Swing	▲4.66	

=== Assembly Election 1989 ===
1989 Goa Legislative Assembly election : St. Andre
Party	Candidate	Votes	%	±%
Independent	Carmo Rafael Andre Jose Pegado	5,097	39.34%	New
INC	Amilkar Adelino Alvares	3,727	28.77%	
MGP	Kashinath Mahadev Govenkar	3,282	25.33%	New
Independent	Dasharath Yeshwant Sawant	282	2.18%	New
Gomantak Lok Pox	Dilip Dharma Borkar	183	1.41%	New
Margin of victory		1,370	10.58%	▼0.24
Turnout		12,955	71.01%	▲3.41
Registered electors		17,816		▲4.38
Independent gain from INC		Swing	▲1.49	

=== Assembly Election 1984 ===
1984 Goa, Daman and Diu Legislative Assembly election : St. Andre
Party	Candidate	Votes	%	±%
INC	Shripad Cuncolienkar	4,478	37.86%	New
Independent	Pereira Teotonio Fracisco Paulo	3,199	27.04%	New
MGP	Sawant Dashrath Yeshwant	1,410	11.92%	New
Independent	Rodrigues Aires A. F. Raimundo	998	7.70%	New
Independent	Popat Kankonkar Ganesh	421	3.25%	New
Independent	Keni Dilip Jaganath	253	1.95%	New
Independent	Bhandri Bhicaji Janardhan	190	1.47%	New
Margin of victory		1,279	10.81%	▲3.04
Turnout		11,829	66.33%	▼0.86
Registered electors		17,068		▲20.74
INC gain from INC(U)		Swing	▼4.49	

=== Assembly Election 1980 ===
1980 Goa, Daman and Diu Legislative Assembly election : St. Andre
Party	Candidate	Votes	%	±%
INC(U)	Teotonio Pereira	4,200	42.35%	New
MGP	Cuncolenkar Sripad Laxman	3,429	34.57%	New
JP	Fernandes Victoria Romeo	804	8.11%	New
Independent	Melo Augustine Santano	634	6.39%	New
Independent	Fernandes Ghanasyam Xavier	214	2.16%	New
Independent	Fernandes Jose Nartins	182	1.84%	New
Margin of victory		771	7.77%	▲5.84
Turnout		9,918	66.94%	▲8.48
Registered electors		14,136		▲4.21
INC(U) gain from INC		Swing	▲8.68	

=== Assembly Election 1977 ===
1977 Goa, Daman and Diu Legislative Assembly election : St. Andre
Party	Candidate	Votes	%	±%
INC	Shripad Cuncolienkar	2,817	33.67%	New
MGP	Pankar Raghuvir Shanu	2,655	31.73%	New
JP	Pereira Teotonio F. Paulo	2,412	28.83%	New
Independent	Gonsalves Salvador Francisco	261	3.12%	New
Independent	Dias Orilando Authony	92	1.10%	New
Independent	D'Sa Francisco Estevao Pedro L. M	26	0.31%	New
Margin of victory		162	1.94%	▼10.71
Turnout		8,367	60.91%	▼12.12
Registered electors		13,565		▼7.30
INC gain from UGP		Swing	▼15.73	

=== Assembly Election 1972 ===
1972 Goa, Daman and Diu Legislative Assembly election : St. Andre
Party	Candidate	Votes	%	±%
UGP	Teotonio Pereira	5,335	49.40%	▼6.33
MGP	Melo Agosttinho Santana	3,969	36.75%	New
INC	Lawandee V. Narayan	1,205	11.16%	New
Independent	A. J. Luis G. Pedro	68	0.63%	New
Margin of victory		1,366	12.65%	▼8.93
Turnout		10,800	72.28%	▼0.19
Registered electors		14,633		▲6.69
UGP hold		Swing	▼6.33	

=== Assembly Election 1967 ===
1967 Goa, Daman and Diu Legislative Assembly election : St. Andre
Party	Candidate	Votes	%	±%
UGP	Teotonio Pereira	5,656	55.73%	New
MGP	Melo Agosttinho Santana	3,466	34.15%	New
Independent	V. Feranandes	348	3.43%	New
Independent	J. C. Fernandes	308	3.03%	New
Independent	J. M. Cota	31	0.31%	New
Independent	F. G. Xavier	22	0.22%	New
Independent	Y. M. Karapurkar	10	0.10%	New
Margin of victory		2,190	21.58%	
Turnout		10,149	71.75%	
Registered electors		13,716		
UGP win (new seat)				
