= 1980 Goa, Daman and Diu Legislative Assembly election =

Election in Indian state

- 1980

All 30 assembly constituencies of the Goa, Daman and Diu Legislative Assembly 16 seats needed for a majority
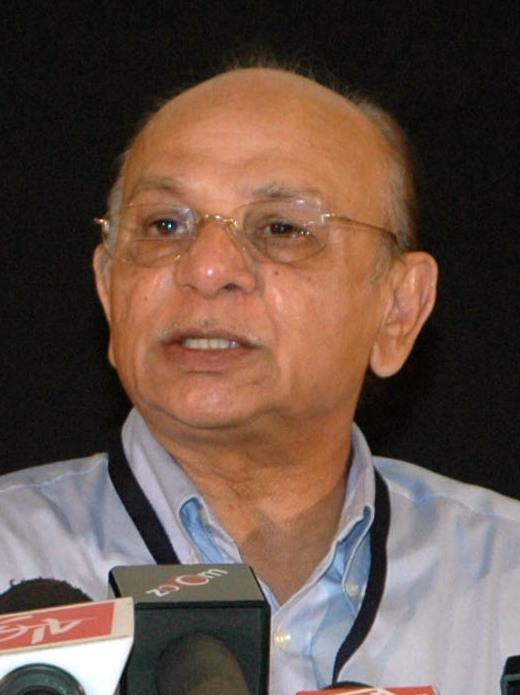

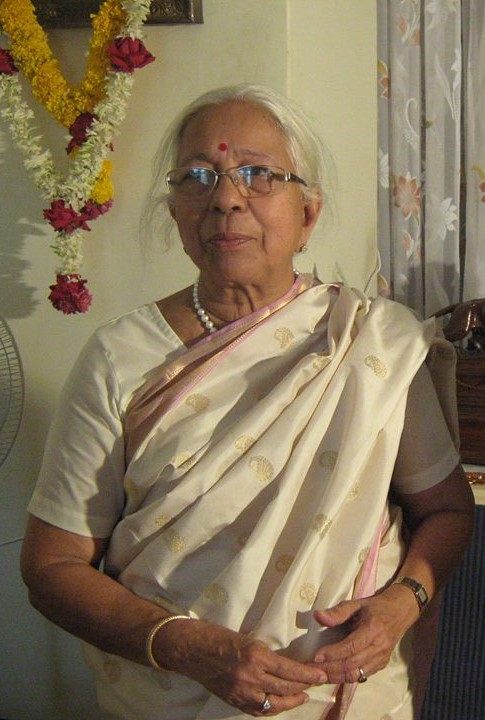
	Majority party	Minority party
Leader	Pratapsingh Rane	Shashikala Kakodkar
Party	INC(U)	MGP
Leader's seat	Satari	Bicholim (lost)
Seats before	0	15
Seats won	20	7
Seat change	▲20	▼8
Chief Minister before election
Shashikala Kakodkar
MGP
Elected Chief Minister
Pratapsingh Rane
INC(U)

Elections were held in the Indian Union territory of Goa, Daman and Diu in 1980, to elect 30 members to the Goa Legislative Assembly. The Indian National Congress (Urs) won a majority of seats as well as the popular vote and Pratapsingh Rane was sworn in as Chief Minister of Goa, Daman and Diu

== Results ==
Party	Votes	%	Seats	+/–
Indian National Congress (Urs)	134,651	38.36	20	New
Maharashtrawadi Gomantak Party	127,714	36.36	7	▼8
Janata Party	14,431	4.11	0	▼3
Indian National Congress	12,338	3.51	0	▼10
Janata Party (Secular)	6,045	1.72	0	New
Communist Party of India (Marxist)	1,089	0.31	0	New
Independents	54,773	15.60	3	▲1
Invalid/blank votes	12,232	–	–	–
Total	363,273	100	30	▲1
Registered voters/turnout	522,652	69.51	–	–
Source: Election Commission of India

=== Results by constituency ===
Winner, runner-up, voter turnout, and victory margin in every constituency
Assembly Constituency		Turnout	Winner				Runner Up				Margin
#k	Names	%	Candidate	Party	Votes	%	Candidate	Party	Votes	%	Margin
1	Pernem	58.66%	Deu Mandrekar	MGP	4,701	51.95%	Morajkar Ramdas Shankar	INC(I)	2,290	25.31%	2,411
2	Mandrem	71.55%	Ramakant Khalap	MGP	5,703	50.73%	Parab Gopal Atmaram	INC(I)	5,301	47.15%	402
3	Siolim	67.75%	Chandrakant Chodankar	Independent	5,841	46.35%	Salgaukar Ladu Buthi	MGP	4,084	32.4%	1,757
4	Calangute	67.55%	Wilfred de Souza	INC(U)	6,920	51.01%	D'Souza Francisco Agusta	MGP	5,506	40.59%	1,414
5	Mapusa	70.25%	Nevagi Shamsunder Jairam	INC(U)	6,640	49.2%	Surendra Sirsat	MGP	5,559	41.19%	1,081
6	Tivim	67.62%	Dayanand Narvekar	INC(U)	8,219	61.43%	Chodankar Madan Varnan	MGP	4,414	32.99%	3,805
7	Bicholim	80.47%	Harish Zantye	Independent	8,354	58.28%	Shashikala Kakodkar	MGP	5,981	41.72%	2,373
8	Pale	75.3%	Naik Vishnu Rama	MGP	5,827	43.07%	Suryarao Sardessai Ramesh Narayan	INC(U)	4,932	36.45%	895
9	Sattari	72.46%	Pratapsingh Rane	INC(U)	5,283	44.71%	Prabhu Tendulkar Sadanand Sonu	MGP	3,211	27.18%	2,072
10	Panaji	65.63%	Vishnu Naik	Independent	3,967	36.56%	Baban Naik	MGP	3,138	28.92%	829
11	St. Cruz	68.94%	Fernandes Michael Antonic Carminho	INC(U)	4,574	42.11%	Branco Francisco Afonso	MGP	3,110	28.63%	1,464
12	Cumbarjua	68.58%	Chodankar Vinayak Dharma	MGP	4,876	41.36%	Mayenkar Mukund Narayan	Independent	3,143	26.66%	1,733
13	St. Andre	66.94%	Teotonio Pereira	INC(U)	4,200	44.38%	Cuncolenkar Sripad Laxman	MGP	3,429	36.24%	771
14	Marcaim	71.56%	Gaunkar Babuso Saulo	MGP	6,377	54.76%	Panjikar Sashi Govind	Independent	3,155	27.09%	3,222
15	Ponda	71.21%	Aguiar Joildo Souza	INC(U)	6,700	47.77%	Ravi Naik	MGP	6,009	42.84%	691
16	Siroda	75.01%	Prabhu Ramchandra Tukaram	INC(U)	6,315	47.86%	Naik Jaykrishna Putu	MGP	5,891	44.65%	424
17	Sanguem	69.07%	Naik Tari Gurudas Vasudev	INC(U)	6,365	51.56%	Karmalkar Vinayak Dharmu	MGP	4,562	36.95%	1,803
18	Rivona	69.31%	Dessai Dilkush Fettu	INC(U)	4,132	42.21%	Velip Jiva Kusta	MGP	3,656	37.35%	476
19	Canacona	73.11%	Gaonkar Vassu Paik	INC(U)	8,855	69.35%	Namshikar Eknath Tukaram	MGP	3,752	29.39%	5,103
20	Quepem	65.3%	Vaikunth Desai	INC(U)	7,073	56.29%	Naik Vithal Sonu	MGP	4,474	35.61%	2,599
21	Cuncolim	56.51%	Jose Vaz	INC(U)	7,328	67.54%	Vaz Afronio Joaquim Piedade	MGP	2,555	23.55%	4,773
22	Benaulim	59.26%	Cruz Francisco Monte Piedade	INC(U)	7,936	74.2%	Cardozo Raul Joaquim	MGP	1,852	17.31%	6,084
23	Navelim	61.99%	Luizinho Faleiro	INC(U)	7,715	73.72%	Temudo Benelito Francisco	MGP	2,287	21.85%	5,428
24	Margao	62.19%	Naik Anant Narcinva	INC(U)	6,502	68.17%	Shirodkar Gokuldas Shanu	MGP	2,628	27.55%	3,874
25	Curtorim	60.29%	Francisco Sardinha	INC(U)	7,418	67.71%	Costa Sebastao Vicente	MGP	2,561	23.38%	4,857
26	Cortalim	65.48%	Froilano Nanchado	INC(U)	6,296	58.74%	Caetano Barreto	MGP	3,077	28.71%	3,219
27	Dabolim	63.56%	Douradao Narculano Luis	INC(U)	5,780	48.72%	Bandekar Shankar Vishnu	MGP	2,510	21.16%	3,270
28	Mormugao	54.84%	Sheikh Hassan Haroon	INC(U)	4,018	45.49%	Arolkar Jagannath Keshav	MGP	3,339	37.8%	679
29	Daman	63.57%	Tandel Narsinhbai Lallubhai	MGP	6,613	46.75%	Mhawla Gulamhusein Ramzan	Independent	3,968	28.05%	2,645
30	Diu	71.86%	Solanki Somji Bhikha	MGP	6,032	56.56%	Fugro Narayan Shrinivas	Independent	4,633	43.44%	1,399
