= Emblem of Goa =

Seal of Goa State

- Armiger: The Government of Goa
- Crest: National Emblem of India
- Shield: Vriksha Deep
- Supporters: Open hands
- Motto: सर्वे भद्राणि पश्यन्तु मा कश्चिद् दुःखमाप्नुयात् May everyone see goodness, may none suffer any pain

The Emblem of Goa is the official emblem of the Government of Goa, a state of India.

== Design ==
The emblem depicts a "Vriksha Deep", a type of diya lamp, at its centre. The lamp represents enlightenment through knowledge and is surrounded by a stylised design of coconut leaves which represent the bountiful and beautiful aspects of Goa. A Sanskrit motto appears above the lamp and can be translated as "may everyone see goodness, may none suffer any pain" (Devnagari: सर्वे भद्राणि पश्यन्तु मा कश्चिद् दुःखमाप्नुयात् Sarve bhadrāṇi paśyantu mā kaścid duḥkhamāpnuyāt). The crest is formed by the National Emblem of India, the Lions of Sarnath, and the arms are supported by two open hands.

== History ==
=== Portuguese India ===
Goa was administered by Portugal from 1510 until 1961 when it was annexed by India.

A proposal for a coat of arms for the colony of Portuguese India, at the request of the General Agency of the Colonies, for the Portuguese Institute of Heraldry and prepared by Afonso Dornelas in June 1932.

Proposed flag of Portuguese India (1932).

Temporary coat of arms representing Portuguese India at the Portuguese colonial exhibition (1934).

Lesser coat of arms of Portuguese India (1935-1961).

Greater coat of arms of Portuguese India (1935-1951).

Greater coat of arms of Portuguese India (1951-1961).

Proposed flag of Portuguese India (1965).

=== Goa, Daman and Diu ===
Between 1961 and 1987, Goa was part of the union territory of Goa, Daman and Diu

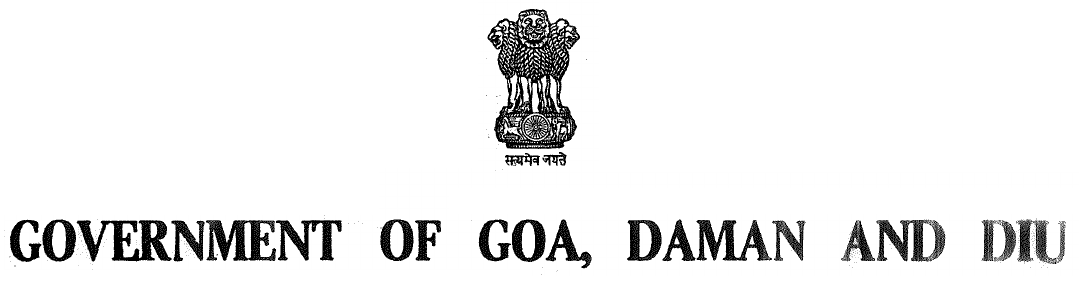
Emblem of Goa, Daman and Diu

== Government banner ==
The Government of Goa can be represented by a banner displaying the emblem of the state on a white field.

Banner of Goa

== See also ==
- National Emblem of India
- List of Indian state emblems
