= 1984 Goa, Daman and Diu Legislative Assembly election =

Election in Indian state

- 27 December 1984

All 30 seats in the Goa, Daman and Diu Legislative Assembly 16 seats needed for a majority
- Registered: 586,657
- Turnout: 71.86%
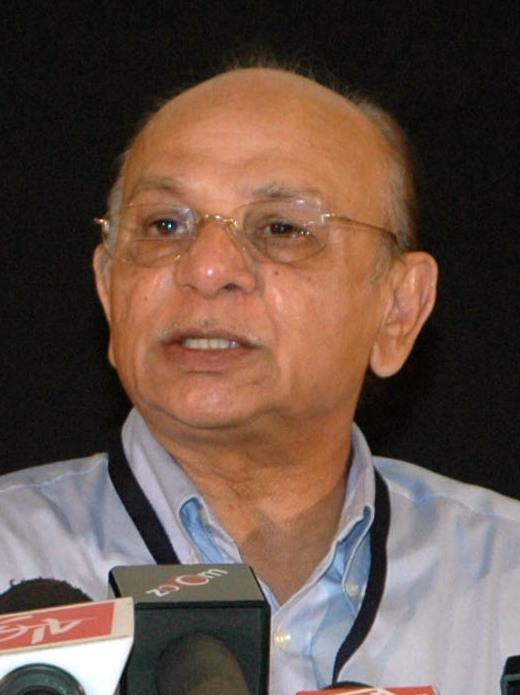
	Majority party	Minority party
		MGP
Leader	Pratapsingh Rane	Ramakant Khalap
Party	INC	MGP
Leader's seat	Sattari Assembly constituency	Mandrem
Seats before	0	7
Seats won	18	8
Seat change	▲18	▲1
Popular vote	39.48%	21.12%
CM before election
Pratapsingh Rane
INC
Elected CM
Pratapsingh Rane
INC

Goa, Daman and Diu within India

Elections to the Goa, Daman and Diu Legislative Assembly were held in December 1984, to elect members of the 60 constituencies in Goa, Daman and Diu, India. The Indian National Congress won the most seats as well as the popular vote, and Pratapsingh Rane was re-appointed as the Chief Minister of Goa, Daman and Diu.

After the passing of the Delimitation of Parliamentary and Assembly Constituencies Order, 1976 by the Delimitation Commission of India, the legislative assembly had 30 constituencies. Halfway through the term, on 30 May 1987, the union territory was split, and Goa was made India's twenty-fifth state, with Daman and Diu remaining a union territory.

== Result ==
Party	Votes	%	Seats	+/–
Indian National Congress	160,944	39.48	18	+18
Maharashtrawadi Gomantak Party	86,100	21.12	8	+1
Bharatiya Janata Party	4,915	1.21	0	New
Janata Party	3,013	0.74	0	0
Communist Party of India	1,554	0.38	0	New
Communist Party of India (Marxist)	756	0.19	0	0
Independents	150,424	36.90	4	+1
Total	407,706	100.00	30	0
Valid votes	407,706	96.72		
Invalid/blank votes	13,844	3.28		
Total votes	421,550	100.00		
Registered voters/turnout	586,657	71.86		
Source: ECI

=== Results by constituency ===
Winner, runner-up, voter turnout, and victory margin in every constituency
Assembly Constituency		Turnout	Winner				Runner Up				Margin
#k	Names	%	Candidate	Party	Votes	%	Candidate	Party	Votes	%	Margin
1	Pernem	68.51%	Bandekar Shambhu Bhavti	INC	4,648	40.2%	Pednekar Mahohar	MGP	4,632	40.06%	16
2	Mandrem	77.29%	Ramakant Khalap	MGP	6,652	51.21%	Parab Gopal Atmaram	INC	4,667	35.93%	1,985
3	Siolim	72.43%	Ashok Salgaonkar	MGP	5,967	40.48%	Chandrakant Chodankar	INC	5,201	35.28%	766
4	Calangute	71.39%	Malik Shrikant Keshav	MGP	5,995	38.87%	Wilfred de Souza	Independent	5,765	37.38%	230
5	Mapusa	70.84%	Diucar Chandreshkar Sihivram	MGP	4,649	33.16%	Dhuri Ulhas Bhiku	INC	4,257	30.37%	392
6	Tivim	70.09%	Dayanand Narvekar	INC	7,858	50.24%	Alvares Gabriel Felix	Independent	4,402	28.15%	3,456
7	Bicholim	73.%	Harish Zantye	INC	8,607	57.25%	Naik Vinayak Vasudeo	MGP	4,782	31.81%	3,825
8	Pale	71.06%	Verenkar Chandrakant Vishwanath	INC	5,897	40.58%	Parab Dasharath Kashinath	MGP	4,184	28.79%	1,713
9	Sattari	76.05%	Pratapsingh Rane	INC	7,769	52.76%	Sadekar Vasudeo Janardhan	MGP	4,639	31.5%	3,130
10	Panaji	64.2%	Joan Gonsalves	INC	4,844	45.85%	Baban Naik	MGP	1,867	17.67%	2,977
11	St. Cruz	66.12%	Branco Freancisco Afonso	Independent	5,537	44.98%	Monteiro Antonicio Antonio Agnelo Marcos Castilho	INC	2,939	23.87%	2,598
12	Cumbarjua	66.86%	Kashinath Jalmi	MGP	3,721	29.84%	Mahambre Premanand Parshuram	INC	3,267	26.2%	454
13	St. Andre	66.33%	Shripad Cuncolienkar	INC	4,478	39.55%	Pereira Teotonio Fracisco Paulo	Independent	3,199	28.25%	1,279
14	Marcaim	75.54%	Gaunkar Babusso Sanvlo	MGP	6,448	47.57%	Naik Shama Mahanandu	INC	4,449	32.82%	1,999
15	Ponda	74.98%	Ravi Naik	MGP	7,384	46.15%	Naik Gaunekar Anil Norsu	INC	4,762	29.76%	2,622
16	Siroda	71.5%	Subhash Shirodkar	INC	6,722	48.5%	Shirodkar Jaikrishna Putu	Independent	3,102	22.38%	3,620
17	Sanguem	71.15%	Naik Pandu Vassu	INC	5,553	39.09%	Dessai Madavarao Shivajirao	Independent	3,510	24.71%	2,043
18	Rivona	71.79%	Prakash Velip	MGP	4,644	40.31%	Phal Dessai Sahnkar	INC	3,685	31.99%	959
19	Canacona	75.48%	Gaonkar Vassu Paik	INC	7,031	47.79%	Kakodkar Shashikala Gurudutt	Independent	3,973	27.%	3,058
20	Quepem	69.8%	Vaikunth Desai	INC	5,375	35.47%	Fernandes Domnic Joaquim	Independent	4,790	31.61%	585
21	Cuncolim	62.47%	Manu Fernandes	INC	5,535	43.94%	Naique Dessai Motilal Rogunata	Independent	2,893	22.96%	2,642
22	Benaulim	68.28%	Cruz Francisco Monte Piedade	INC	7,280	56.03%	Churchill Alemao	Independent	5,555	42.75%	1,725
23	Navelim	64.45%	Luizinho Faleiro	Independent	9,126	68.08%	Temudo Benedito Francis	INC	3,472	25.9%	5,654
24	Margao	65.8%	Bhembre Uday Laxmikant	Independent	6,132	53.1%	Naik Ananta Narcinva	INC	4,775	41.35%	1,357
25	Curtorim	66.4%	Francisco Sardinha	INC	9,452	69.86%	Dias Inacio Caetano Marcelino	Independent	3,787	27.99%	5,665
26	Cortalim	62.91%	Barbosa Luis Proto	INC	4,818	41.89%	Fernandes Antonio Francisco Paulo	Independent	3,195	27.78%	1,623
27	Dabolim	64.61%	D'Souza Simon Peter	INC	5,865	38.57%	Dourado Herculano Teodoro	Independent	3,171	20.85%	2,694
28	Mormugao	62.71%	Sheikh Hassan Haroon	INC	6,425	51.41%	Amonkar Padmanabh Hari	MGP	2,873	22.99%	3,552
29	Daman	70.9%	Prabhakar Jivanbhai Somabhai	Independent	5,316	29.64%	Patel Dahyabhai Vallabhabhai	Independent	3,451	19.24%	1,865
30	Diu	72.03%	Solanki Shamjibhai Bhikha	INC	6,109	50.29%	Fugro Narayan Shrinivass	Independent	5,727	47.15%	382

== Later events ==
In May 1987, the Government of India split the union territory of Goa, Daman and Diu into the new state of Goa and the union territory of Daman and Diu by The Constitution (Fifty-sixth Amendment) Act, 1987. The new Goa Legislative Assembly was assigned 40 seats from the next election, in 1989.

== See also ==
- List of constituencies of the Goa Legislative Assembly
- 1984 elections in India
