= Gopal Kamat =

Indian politician and lawyer (1917–1990)

- Official portrait in 1967

Speaker of Goa Legislative Assembly
- In office 13 April 1967 – 23 March 1972
- Preceded by: Pandurang Purushottam Shirodkar
- Succeeded by: Narayan Fugro

Member of Goa Legislative Assembly
- In office 1967–1972
- Preceded by: Jaisingrao V Rane
- Succeeded by: Pratapsingh Rane
- Constituency: Sattari
- Majority: 2,962 (40.04%)

Personal details
- Born: Gopal Apa Kamat; 22 July 1917 Sanquelim, Goa, Portuguese India, Portuguese Empire (now in India)
- Died: 2 May 1990 (aged 72) Goa, India
- Party: Independent (1967–1972)
- Other political affiliations: Indian National Congress; All India Congress Committee; Maharashtrawadi Gomantak Party (1963–1967)
- Spouse: Gulab Mulgaonkar
- Education: Lyceum course; Sanad for state examination in Law
- Occupation: Politician
- Profession: Lawyer

Gopal Apa Kamat (22 July 1917 – 2 May 1990) was an Indian politician, freedom fighter, journalist and lawyer. He was a former member of the Goa Legislative Assembly, representing the Sattari Assembly constituency from 1967 to 1972. He was also a former speaker of the Goa Legislative Assembly in the same term.
