= Sattari Assembly constituency =

Former constituency of the Goa Legislative Assembly, India

Coordinates: 15.599°N 74.059°E

Sattari
- Former constituency for the Goa Legislative Assembly

Constituency details
- Country: India
- Region: Western India
- State: Goa
- District: North Goa
- Lok Sabha constituency: North Goa
- Established: 1963
- Abolished: 1984
- Total electors: 19,361 (Note: last recorded in 1984 according to)
- Reservation: None

Sattari Constituency (Note: also spelled as Satari during the tenure years.) was one of the 30 Goa Legislative Assembly constituencies of the state of Goa in southern India. Sattari was also one of the constituencies falling under North Goa Lok Sabha constituency.

== Members of Goa Legislative Assembly ==
Year	Member	Party
1963	Jaisingrao Rane	Praja Socialist Party
1967	Gopal Kamat	Maharashtrawadi Gomantak Party
1972	Pratapsingh Rane	Maharashtrawadi Gomantak Party
1977	Pratapsingh Rane	Indian National Congress
1980	Pratapsingh Rane	Indian National Congress
1984	Pratapsingh Rane	Indian National Congress

== Election results ==
=== Assembly Election 1984 ===
1984 Goa, Daman and Diu Legislative Assembly election : Sattari
Party	Candidate	Votes	%	±%
INC	Pratapsingh Rane	7,769	50.27%	New
MGP	Sadekar Vasudeo Janardhan	4,639	30.02%	▲4.19
Independent	Desai Baburao Hirojiroa	939	6.08%	New
CPI	Gonsalves Vincy	472	3.05%	New
Independent	Malsenkar Kaseo Shiva	292	1.89%	New
Independent	Rane Sardessai Sanyogita Zaiba	218	1.41%	New
Independent	Desai Prakash Sakharam	210	1.36%	New
Margin of victory		3,130	20.25%	▲3.59
Turnout		15,455	76.05%	▲3.58
Registered electors		19,361		▲18.74
INC gain from INC(U)		Swing	▲7.77	

=== Assembly Election 1980 ===
1980 Goa, Daman and Diu Legislative Assembly election : Sattari
Party	Candidate	Votes	%	±%
INC(U)	Pratapsingh Rane	5,283	42.50%	New
MGP	Prabhu Tendulkar Sadanand Sonu	3,211	25.83%	▼3.57
JP	Rane Jaysingrao Benkatrao	2,038	16.39%	▲3.02
Independent	Sinai Usgaonkar Attchut Kashinath	961	7.73%	New
Independent	Kauthankar Vishwanath Janardhan	190	1.53%	New
Independent	Joshi Shrikant Ramchandra	132	1.06%	New
Margin of victory		2,072	16.67%	▲5.68
Turnout		12,432	72.46%	▲8.82
Registered electors		16,305		▲8.71
INC(U) gain from INC		Swing	▲2.11	

=== Assembly Election 1977 ===
1977 Goa, Daman and Diu Legislative Assembly election : Sattari
Party	Candidate	Votes	%	±%
INC	Pratapsingh Rane	4,084	40.38%	▲28.91
MGP	Jaisingrao Rane	2,973	29.40%	▼19.70
JP	Pednekar Devidas Krishna	1,352	13.37%	New
Independent	Dessai Kesnav Janardan	470	4.65%	New
Independent	Mujawar Shaki Ali Ibrahim	405	4.00%	New
Independent	Gaonkar Budaji Vithal	375	3.71%	New
CPI	Vaz Joarge Bastiao	129	1.28%	New
Margin of victory		1,111	10.99%	▼15.33
Turnout		10,113	65.26%	▼3.92
Registered electors		14,998		▲4.98
INC gain from MGP		Swing	▼8.71	

=== Assembly Election 1972 ===
1972 Goa, Daman and Diu Legislative Assembly election : Sattari
Party	Candidate	Votes	%	±%
MGP	Pratapsingh Rane	5,005	49.10%	▲12.66
SSP	Jaisingrao Rane	2,322	22.78%	New
INC	Kamat Gopal Apa	1,170	11.48%	New
UGP	S. D. Ramchandra	661	6.48%	▼2.75
MGP	K. V. Janardan	245	2.40%	▼34.03
ABJS	Joshi Laximan Vishnu	200	1.96%	New
Margin of victory		2,683	26.32%	▲3.02
Turnout		10,194	67.61%	▲7.94
Registered electors		14,287		▲11.45
MGP hold		Swing	▲12.66	

=== Assembly Election 1967 ===
1967 Goa, Daman and Diu Legislative Assembly election : Sattari
Party	Candidate	Votes	%	±%
MGP	Gopal Kamat	2,962	36.44%	New
Independent	D. B. Hirojirao	1,068	13.14%	New
UGP	S. Dattaram	751	9.24%	New
Independent	G. D. Shirookar	572	7.04%	New
Independent	T. A . Krishna	530	6.52%	New
PSP	R. J. Vyankatrao	449	5.52%	New
Independent	K. Rane	424	5.22%	New
Margin of victory		1,894	23.30%	
Turnout		8,129	57.70%	
Registered electors		12,819		
MGP win (new seat)				
