= 1977 Goa, Daman and Diu Legislative Assembly election =

Election in Indian state

- 1977

All 30 assembly constituencies 16 seats needed for a majority
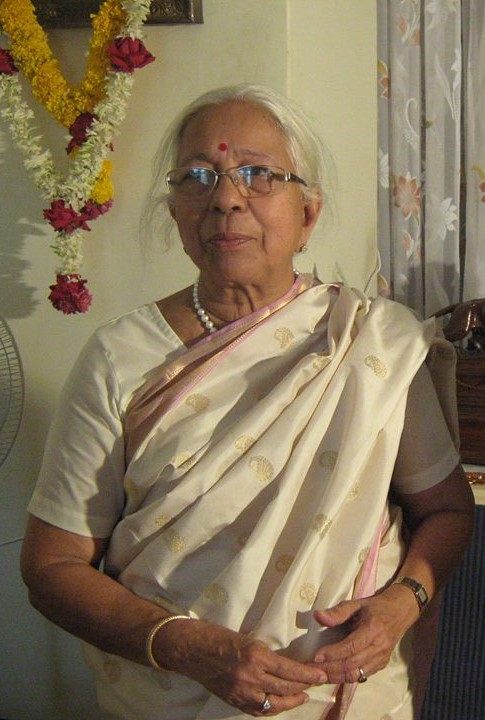

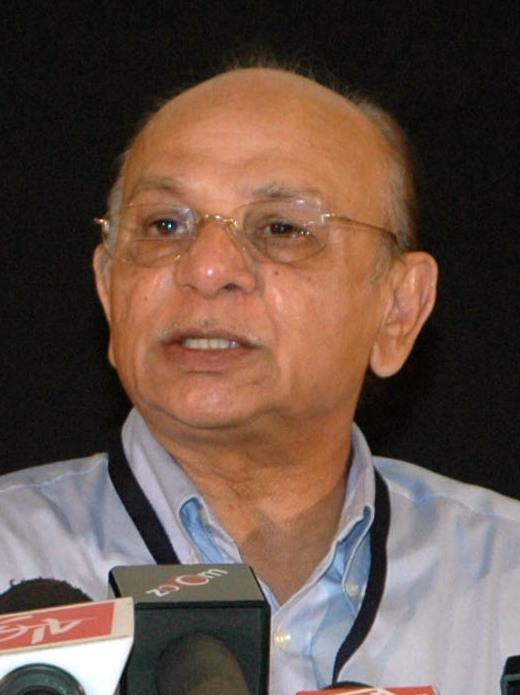
	Majority party	Minority party
Leader	Shashikala Kakodkar	Pratapsingh Rane
Party	MGP	INC
Leader's seat	Bicholim	Satari
Seats before	18	1
Seats won	15	10
Seat change	▼3	▲9
Chief Minister before election
Shashikala Kakodkar
MGP
Elected Chief Minister
Shashikala Kakodkar
MGP

Goa, Daman & Diu Legislative Assembly election, 1977 was held in Indian Union territory of Goa in 1977, to elect 30 members to the Goa Legislative Assembly.

== Results ==
Summary of results of the Goa Legislative Assembly election, 1977
Political Party	Seats contested	Seats won	Number of Votes	% of Votes	Seat change
Maharashtrawadi Gomantak Party	29	15	116,339	38.49%	▼3
Indian National Congress	27	10	87,461	28.94%	▲9
Janata Party	30	3	69,823	23.10%	▲3
Independents	57	2	28,022	9.27%	▲1
Total	145	30	302,237		

=== Results by constituency ===
Winner, runner-up, voter turnout, and victory margin in every constituency
Assembly Constituency		Turnout	Winner				Runner Up				Margin
#k	Names	%	Candidate	Party	Votes	%	Candidate	Party	Votes	%	Margin
1	Pernem	51.68%	Deu Mandrekar	MGP	3,978	50.3%	Morajkar Ramdas Shankar	INC	1,990	25.16%	1,988
2	Mandrem	62.38%	Ramakant Khalap	MGP	5,394	56.64%	Parab Gopal Atmaram	INC	3,375	35.44%	2,019
3	Siolim	64.54%	Chandrakant Chodankar	MGP	6,088	52.69%	Punaji Achrekar	JP	3,211	27.79%	2,877
4	Calangute	62.16%	Fernandes Rual Ilario	MGP	4,621	39.3%	Fernandes Mark A. Anselmo	JP	4,335	36.87%	286
5	Mapusa	63.93%	Surendra Sirsat	MGP	5,229	43.26%	Bhandare Gangadhar Yeshwant	JP	3,563	29.48%	1,666
6	Tivim	61.25%	Dayanand Narvekar	MGP	4,557	41.9%	Rinbeeio Malvina Leoner Pinto Rangel	JP	4,094	37.64%	463
7	Bicholim	71.93%	Shashikala Kakodkar	MGP	6,866	56.46%	Naik Vinayak Vasudev	INC	3,746	30.8%	3,120
8	Pale	67.15%	Shenvi Surlikar Laxmikant Santaram	INC	5,108	45.3%	Sinai Usgaonker Atchut Kashinath	MGP	4,752	42.15%	356
9	Sattari	65.26%	Pratapsingh Rane	INC	4,084	41.72%	Jaisingrao Rane	MGP	2,973	30.37%	1,111
10	Panaji	55.41%	Madhav R. Bir	JP	3,555	40.95%	Sardessai Kashinath Venkatesh	MGP	2,549	29.36%	1,006
11	St. Cruz	67.14%	Jack de Sequeira	JP	4,462	46.11%	Fernandes Manuel Francisco Xavier Diogo	MGP	2,656	27.45%	1,806
12	Cumbarjua	62.78%	Ghodankar Vinayak Dharma	MGP	5,145	48.64%	Desai Shrikant Govind	JP	4,177	39.49%	968
13	St. Andre	60.91%	Shripad Cuncolienkar	INC	2,817	34.09%	Pankar Raghuvir Shanu	MGP	2,655	32.13%	162
14	Marcaim	67.01%	Bandodcar Krishan Ragu	MGP	6,246	60.72%	Panjiker Shashi Govind	Independent	2,400	23.33%	3,846
15	Ponda	70.15%	Rhoidas Naik	MGP	4,749	46.24%	Aguiar Joildo Souza	INC	4,436	43.19%	313
16	Siroda	63.17%	Naik Jayakrishna Putu	MGP	5,964	58.63%	Shirodhar Vassanta Shankar	INC	2,988	29.37%	2,976
17	Sanguem	61.96%	Marather Sadashiv Vaman	MGP	5,239	50.18%	Naik Tari Gurudas Vassudev	INC	4,391	42.06%	848
18	Rivona	65.39%	Dessai Dilkush Fettu	MGP	3,442	40.25%	Desai Molu Ganaba	INC	2,371	27.72%	1,071
19	Canacona	70.25%	Gaonkar Vasu Paik	MGP	5,544	49.84%	Prabhu Gopal Venkatesh	JP	3,013	27.09%	2,531
20	Quepem	60.15%	Vaikunth Desai	INC	4,168	40.66%	Gaunso Dessai Satish Nilu	MGP	3,597	35.09%	571
21	Cuncolim	56.12%	Ferdino Rebello	JP	3,321	31.81%	Roque Santana Fernandes	INC	3,281	31.42%	40
22	Benaulim	55.35%	Cota Lourence Pedro Santano	INC	4,196	42.91%	Barreto Jaco Jesmina	JP	3,117	31.87%	1,079
23	Navelim	58.76%	Leo Velho Mauricio	INC	4,434	49.35%	Kadam Shantaram Bicaji	MGP	2,425	26.99%	2,009
24	Margao	62.81%	Naik Ananta Narcinava	INC	4,551	49.17%	Vaidya Gopal Pandurang	MGP	2,764	29.86%	1,787
25	Curtorim	53.59%	Francisco Sardinha	INC	3,945	42.3%	Aguiar Manuel Sebastiao	JP	2,817	30.21%	1,128
26	Cortalim	61.02%	Froilano Machado	INC	4,654	50.96%	Colaco Pedro Anastacio	MGP	2,431	26.62%	2,223
27	Dabolim	55.39%	Laad Shankar Vishveswar	MGP	3,057	39.01%	Dourado Herculano Teodoro	INC	2,445	31.2%	612
28	Mormugao	51.49%	Sheikh Hassan Haroon	INC	3,256	38.62%	Joshi Vasant Subray	MGP	2,615	31.02%	641
29	Daman	67.99%	Bhathela Makanbhai Morarji	Independent	6,423	45.77%	Bhathela Dajibhai Kanjibhai	JP	6,401	45.61%	22
30	Diu	70.76%	Fugro Narayan Shrinivas	Independent	5,522	56.41%	Modasia Balubhai Dharsi	MGP	3,565	36.42%	1,957
