= Goa, Daman and Diu =

1961–1987 union territory of India

Coordinates: 15°20′N 74°05′E

Goa, Daman and Diu Goem, Damanv ani Diu (Konkani)
- 1961–1987
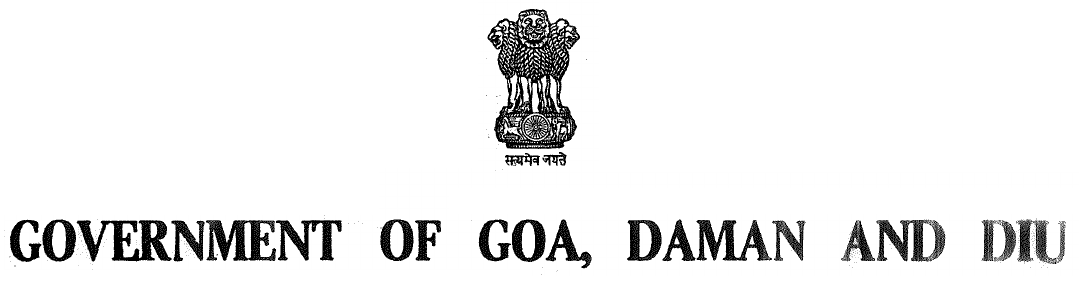
- Coat of arms

- Goa, Daman and Diu in India
- Status: Union Territory
- Capital: Panjim
- Common languages: Konkani; Marathi; Gujarati; Indo-Portuguese; Portuguese
- Lieutenant Governor
  - 1961-62 (first): Maj Gen K. P. Candeth (Military Governor)
  - 1984-87 (last): Gopal Singh
- Chief Minister
  - 1963-66 (first): Dayanand Bandodkar
  - 1985-87 (last): Pratapsingh Rane
- History
  - Annexation: 19 December 1961
  - Statehood for Goa: 30 May 1987
- Currency: Indian rupee
Preceded by	Succeeded by
Portuguese India	Goa; Daman and Diu

Goa, Daman and Diu (Konkani: Goem, Damanv ani Diu, Portuguese: Goa, Damão e Dio) was a union territory of the Republic of India established in 1961 following the annexation of Portuguese India, with Maj Gen K P Candeth as its first governor. The Goa portion of the territory was granted full statehood within the Indian union on 30 May 1987, Daman and Diu remained a separate territory until December 2019, when it was merged with Dadra and Nagar Haveli and is today the territory of Dadra and Nagar Haveli and Daman and Diu (Damaon, Dio & Silvassa).

The areas of Goa and Damaon are located at the southern and northern edges of the Konkan region, the two geographically separated from each other by land and sea, the two areas were among the many other possessions that were ruled over for centuries by the Portuguese in Goa and Bombay.

For the purposes of local administration under Indian administration, the territory was divided into three districts; namely Goa, Damaon, and Dio district, with the capital at Panjim.

== Lieutenant governors of Union territory of Goa, Daman and Diu ==
Goa, along with Daman and Diu was a Union Territory of India until 30 May 1987. As such it had a lieutenant governor till that time.

#	Name	Took office	Left office	Birth-Death
1	Maj Gen K. P. Candeth (military governor)	19 December 1961	6 June 1962	1916–2003
2	T. Sivasankar	7 June 1962	1 September 1963	189?–19??
3	M. R. Sachdev	2 September 1963	8 December 1964	1903–1964
4	Hari Sharma	12 December 1964	23 February 1965	1910–1987
5	K. R. Damle	24 February 1965	17 April 1967	1912–2001
6	Nakul Sen	18 April 1967	15 November 1972	1915–1983
7	S. K. Banerji	16 November 1972	15 November 1977	1922–2010
8	P. S. Gill	16 November 1977	30 March 1981	1927-living
9	Jagmohan	31 March 1981	29 August 1982	1927–2021
10	I H Latif	30 August 1982	23 February 1983	1923–2018
11	K. T. Satarawala	24 February 1983	3 July 1984	1930–2016
12	I H Latif	4 July 1984	23 September 1984	1923–2018
13	Gopal Singh	24 September 1984	29 May 1987	1917–1990

== Chief Ministers of Union territory of Goa, Daman and Diu ==
No. (Note: A parenthetical number indicates that the incumbent has previously held office.)	Portrait	Name	Constituency	Term of office			Assembly (election)	Party (Note: This column only names the chief minister's party. The state government he heads may be a complex coalition of several parties and independents; these are not listed here.)
No.	Portrait	Name	Constituency	From	To	Days in office	Assembly (election)	Party
1		Dayanand Bandodkar	Marcaim	20 December 1963	2 December 1966	2 years, 347 days	Interim	Maharashtrawadi Gomantak Party
–		Vacant (Note: When President's rule is in force in a state, its council of ministers stands dissolved. The office of chief minister thus lies vacant. At times, the legislative assembly also stands dissolved.) (President's rule)	N/A	2 December 1966	5 April 1967	124 days		N/A
(1)		Dayanand Bandodkar	Marcaim	5 April 1967	23 March 1972	6 years, 129 days	1st (1967 election)	Maharashtrawadi Gomantak Party
(1)		Dayanand Bandodkar	Marcaim	23 March 1972	12 August 1973	6 years, 129 days	2nd (1972 election)	Maharashtrawadi Gomantak Party
2		Shashikala Kakodkar	Bicholim	12 August 1973	7 June 1977	5 years, 258 days	2nd (1972 election)	Maharashtrawadi Gomantak Party
2		Shashikala Kakodkar	Bicholim	7 June 1977	27 April 1979	5 years, 258 days	3rd (1977 election)	Maharashtrawadi Gomantak Party
–		Vacant (President's rule)	N/A	27 April 1979	16 January 1980	264 days		N/A
3		Pratapsingh Rane	Sattari	16 January 1980	7 January 1985	7 years, 134 days	4th (1980 election)	Indian National Congress (U)
3		Pratapsingh Rane	Sattari	7 January 1985	30 May 1987	7 years, 134 days	5th (1984 election)	Indian National Congress
