= Jaisingrao Rane =

Indian politician and freedom fighter

Jaisingrao Venkatrao Rane (unknown – 23 January 2012) was an Indian politician, freedom fighter and writer. He was a member of the Praja Socialist Party. Rane was a member of the Goa Legislative Assembly in 1963 from the Sattari constituency in North Goa.
