= Balkrishna Prabhu =

Indian politician and agriculturist (born 1942)

Member of Goa Legislative Assembly
- In office 1989–1994
- Preceded by: constituency established
- Succeeded by: Narahari Haldankar
- Constituency: Valpoi
- Majority: 5,436 (54.91%)

Councillor of Valpoi Municipality
- In office 15 October 1989 – unknown

Personal details
- Born: Balkrishna Ashok Prabhu; 13 June 1942 (age 84) Valpoi, Goa, Portuguese India
- Party: Independent (1999–present)
- Other political affiliations: Indian National Congress (1989–1994)
- Spouse: Suchita Prabhu
- Children: 1
- Education: Segundo Gravo; Secondary School Certificate; Diploma in business correspondence
- Occupation: Politician
- Profession: Agriculturist
- Committees: Library; Petitions; Public Accounts
- Nickname: Ashok Jairam

Balkrishna Ashok Prabhu (born 13 June 1942), also known as Ashok Jairam, is an Indian politician and agriculturist from Goa. He is a former member of the Goa Legislative Assembly, representing the Valpoi Assembly constituency from 1989 to 1994.

== Early and personal life ==
Balkrishna Ashok Prabhu was born at Valpoi in Sattari (Goan Konkani: taluka) (English: sub-district). He completed his primary studies in (Portuguese: Segundo Gravo) and further completed his schooling with a Secondary School Certificate. He also has a diploma in business correspondence. He is married to Suchita Prabhu, the couple has a son, Vishvesh Prabhu, a businessperson who had unsuccessfully contested the 2022 Goa Legislative Assembly election from the Valpoi Assembly constituency.

Prabhu is a polyglot, he speaks English, Konkani, Marathi, Hindi and Portuguese. Some of his hobbies include sports such as football, cricket, kabaddi and badminton, classical music and social service. He is a member of the Bajrang Club and Kabaddi Welfare Board. Some of his special interests are organizing blood donation camps, medical and eye check ups, family planning camps and tournaments.

== Career ==
Prabhu contested in the 1989 Goa Legislative Assembly election from the Valpoi Assembly constituency on the Indian National Congress (INC) ticket, he emerged victorious by defeating Maharashtrawadi Gomantak Party candidate, Baburao Harijirao Desai with a margin of 1,130 votes. He was also elected unopposed as the Councillor of the Valpoi Municipality on 15 October 1989. He has also arranged seminars for his party workers.

Prabhu then unsuccessfully contested the 1994 Goa Legislative Assembly election from the same constituency on the INC ticket, he lost to Narahari Haldankar, a member of the Bhartiya Janata Party with a margin of 958 votes. Prabhu last unsuccessfully contested the 1999 Goa Legislative Assembly election from the same constituency as an independent candidate, he lost to INC candidate, Venkatesh Desai with a margin of 2,219 votes.

== Positions held ==
- Councillor of the Valpoi Municipality (1989)
- Member of the State Transport Authority
- Member of the Library Committee (1990)
- Member of the Petitions Committee on (1991–92)
- Chairman of Public Accounts Committee (1991–92)
