= 1999 Goa Legislative Assembly election =

Election in Indian state

- 4 June 1999

All 40 seats in the Assembly 21 seats needed for a majority
- Turnout: 65%

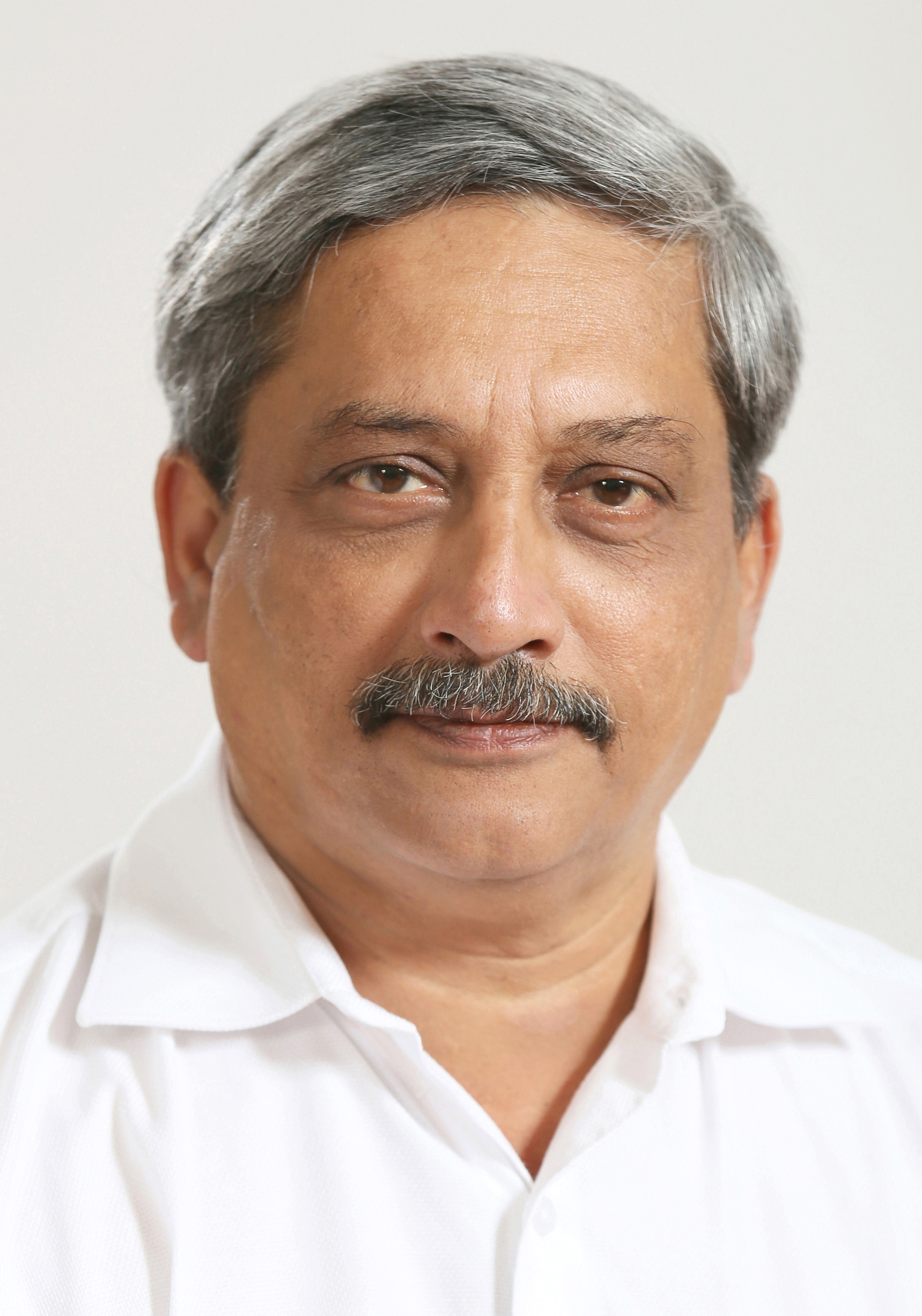
	Majority party	Minority party
Leader	Luizinho Faleiro	Manohar Parrikar
Party	INC	BJP
Leader's seat	Navelim Assembly constituency	Panaji Assembly constituency
Seats won	21	10
Seat change	▲3	▲6
Chief Minister before election
Luizinho Faleiro
INC
Chief Minister after election
Luizinho Faleiro
INC

Elections for the Indian state of Goa took place in June 1999.

== Parties contested ==
No.	Party	Flag	Symbol	Leader	Seats contested
1.	Indian National Congress			Luizinho Faleiro	40
2.	Bharatiya Janata Party			Manohar Parrikar	39
3.	Maharashtrawadi Gomantak Party			Shashikala Kakodkar	25
4.	Goa Rajiv Congress Party			Wilfred de Souza	14
5.	United Goans Democratic Party			Churchill Alemao	11

== Results ==
Rank	Party	Seats Contested	Seats Won
1	Indian National Congress	40	21
2	Bharatiya Janata Party	39	10
3	Maharashtrawadi Gomantak	17	4
4	United Goans Democratic Party	11	2
5	Goa Rajiv Congress Party	14	2
6	Independent	49	1
	Total		40

== Results by constituency ==
The following is the list of winning MLAs in the election.

Winner, runner-up, voter turnout, and victory margin in every constituency
Assembly Constituency		Turnout	Winner				Runner Up				Margin
#k	Names	%	Candidate	Party	Votes	%	Candidate	Party	Votes	%	Margin
1	Mandrem	73.32%	Ramakant Khalap	MGP	5,401	39.6%	Parab Sangeeta Gopal	INC	4,219	30.94%	1,182
2	Pernem	72.72%	Deshprabhu Jitendra Raghuraj	INC	5,129	41.32%	Kotkar Parshuram Nagesh	MGP	3,963	31.93%	1,166
3	Dargalim	68.24%	Manohar Ajgaonkar	INC	4,328	42.92%	Dhargalkar Balkrishna Atmaram	BJP	3,232	32.05%	1,096
4	Tivim	67.43%	Dayanand Narvekar	INC	6,989	41.17%	Halarnkar Nilkant Ramnath	Goa Rajiv Congress Party	4,333	25.53%	2,656
5	Mapusa	61.06%	Francis D'Souza	Goa Rajiv Congress Party	5,602	36.2%	Natekar Gurudas Bhalchandra	INC	4,027	26.02%	1,575
6	Siolim	67.06%	Dayanand Mandrekar	BJP	4,455	27.13%	Marques Milton Olympio	INC	3,663	22.3%	792
7	Calangute	66.33%	Parulekar Suresh Vishwanath	UGDP	7,670	46.36%	Tomazinho Cardozo	INC	6,921	41.83%	749
8	Saligao	67.67%	Wilfred de Souza	Goa Rajiv Congress Party	5,006	35.94%	Kalangutkar Deelip Sonu	MGP	4,542	32.61%	464
9	Aldona	61.33%	Ulhas Asnodkar	BJP	6,587	36.69%	Halankar Vishwanath Rohidas	INC	2,738	15.25%	3,849
10	Panaji	56.27%	Manohar Parrikar	BJP	5,396	51.53%	Prabhu Keshav Laximidhar	INC	2,647	25.28%	2,749
11	Taleigao	60.36%	Somnath Dattta Zuwarkar	INC	8,288	52.71%	Salkar Subhash Tukaram	BJP	6,461	41.09%	1,827
12	St. Cruz	66.97%	Victoria Fernandes	INC	8,829	50.78%	Hoble Anil Raghuvir	MGP	3,442	19.8%	5,387
13	St. Andre	72.07%	Francisco Silveira	INC	7,080	45.5%	Kamat Dhakankar Avinash Govind	BJP	4,376	28.12%	2,704
14	Cumbarjua	64.76%	Nirmala Prabhakar Sawant	INC	6,004	37.18%	Parvatkar Govind Bhikaji	BJP	5,154	31.92%	850
15	Bicholim	73.13%	Pandurang Raut	MGP	5,089	33.04%	Rajesh Patnekar	BJP	4,999	32.46%	90
16	Maem	72.73%	Prakash Fadte	BJP	3,420	27.16%	Chopdekar Murari Sambha	INC	2,582	20.51%	838
17	Pale	71.48%	Suresh Amonkar	BJP	7,156	44.41%	Gawas Gurudas Prabhakar	INC	4,805	29.82%	2,351
18	Poriem	74.62%	Pratapsingh Rane	INC	7,865	52.93%	Santoba Krishnarao Dessai	MGP	3,407	22.93%	4,458
19	Valpoi	71.12%	Venkatesh Desai	INC	4,177	38.01%	Narahari Haldankar	BJP	3,323	30.24%	854
20	Ponda	66.79%	Ravi Naik	INC	9,349	48.72%	Khedekar Yeshwant Uttam	BJP	5,313	27.69%	4,036
21	Priol	73.01%	Vishwas Satarkar	BJP	6,563	37.29%	Dr.Kashinath Jalmi	MGP	4,593	26.1%	1,970
22	Marcaim	73.84%	Sudin Dhavalikar	MGP	6,537	38.94%	Naik Shripad Yasso	BJP	5,843	34.8%	694
23	Siroda	75.79%	Subhash Shirodkar	INC	9,548	56.56%	Naik Manohar Gopal	BJP	6,339	37.55%	3,209
24	Mormugao	52.43%	Sheikh Hassan Haroon	INC	4,721	29.65%	Kocharekar Archana Kishor	BJP	3,698	23.23%	1,023
25	Vasco Da Gama	51.89%	Jose Philip D'Souza	UGDP	5,691	33.11%	Rajendra Arlekar	BJP	4,183	24.34%	1,508
26	Cortalim	62.4%	Mauvin Godinho	INC	7,230	41.06%	Dourado Herculano T.	UGDP	6,129	34.81%	1,101
27	Loutolim	-	Aleixo Sequeira	INC	Elected Unopposed						
28	Benaulim	60.99%	Churchill Alemao	INC	8,625	66.8%	Radharao Socrates Gracias	UGDP	3,788	29.34%	4,837
29	Fatorda	55.38%	Cardoz Luis Alex Florence	INC	7,164	47.76%	Eng. Ashok Tukaram Korgaonkar	BJP	4,421	29.48%	2,743
30	Margao	52.72%	Digambar Kamat	BJP	7,549	58.45%	M. K. Shaikh	INC	4,272	33.08%	3,277
31	Curtorim	59.%	Francisco Sardinha	INC	10,843	83.66%	Gaunkar Antonio Damiao	Independent	1,293	9.98%	9,550
32	Navelim	56.3%	Luizinho Faleiro	INC	12,054	75.48%	Sheikh Jina Nabi	BJP	2,293	14.36%	9,761
33	Velim	59.31%	Filipe Nery Rodrigues	INC	7,829	65.83%	Manu Fernandes	Goa Rajiv Congress Party	2,557	21.5%	5,272
34	Cuncolim	56.65%	Arecio D'Souza	INC	5,481	43.93%	D Silva Julio Teodomiro	BJP	3,267	26.19%	2,214
35	Sanvordem	66.88%	Vinay Dinu Tendulkar	BJP	4,600	29.28%	Gaonkar Ganesh Chandru	INC	3,924	24.97%	676
36	Sanguem	68.6%	Prabhakar Gaonkar	BJP	3,498	28.79%	Dessai Satyavan Bhadru	INC	2,711	22.31%	787
37	Curchorem	66.43%	Ramrao Dessai	BJP	7,640	46.95%	Domnick Fernandes	INC	7,271	44.68%	369
38	Quepem	66.64%	Prakash Velip	MGP	5,648	36.62%	Raul Rocky Pereira	INC	5,509	35.72%	139
39	Canacona	74.17%	Bandekar Sanjay Vimal	INC	4,849	37.37%	Pai Khot Vijay Anandrao	BJP	4,678	36.05%	171
40	Poinguinim	76.35%	Isidore Fernandes	Independent	4,860	45.04%	Govind Raghuchandra Acharya	MGP	3,201	29.66%	1,659

== Government formation ==
Indian National Congress formed the government under the leadership of Luizinho Faleiro which lasted for 169 days. Francisco Sardinha broke the Indian National Congress and formed the government with the help of Bharatiya Janata Party which lasted for 334 days.

On 24 October 2000, Bharatiya Janata Party formed its first government in Goa under the leadership of Manohar Parrikar which lasted for 1 year and 223 days before the next elections were called off.
