= 1994 Goa Legislative Assembly election =

Election in Indian state

- 16 November 1994

All 40 seats in the Goa Legislative Assembly 21 seats needed for a majority
- Turnout: 71.2%(▼1.27%)
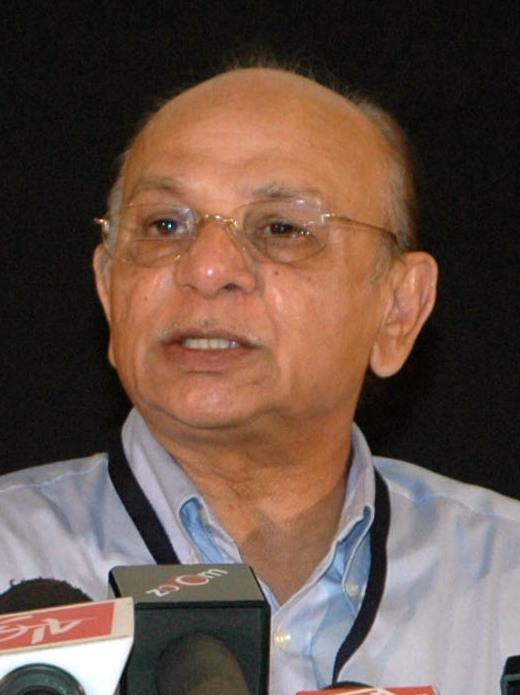

	Majority party	Minority party	Third party
Leader	Pratapsingh Rane
Party	INC	MGP	BJP
Alliance		NDA	NDA
Last election	20	18	0
Seats won	18	12	4
Seat change	▼2	▼6	▲4
Popular vote	216165	128033	52094
Percentage	37.5%	22.2%	9.0%
Swing		▼16.58%	▲9.39%
Chief Minister before election
Wilfred de Souza
INC
Elected Chief Minister
Pratapsingh Rane
INC

Legislative Assembly elections were held in Goa on 16 November 1994 to elect all 40 members of the Goa Legislative Assembly.

== Results ==
Party	Votes	%	Seats
Indian National Congress	216,165	37.54	18
Maharashtrawadi Gomantak Party	128,033	22.24	12
Bhartiya Janata Party	52,094	9.05	4
United Goans Democratic Party	47,765	8.30	3
Bahujan Samaj Party	9,109	1.58	0
Shiv Sena	8,347	1.45	0
Communist Party of India	3,424	0.59	0
Communist Party of India (Marxist)	2,431	0.42	0
Gomantak Lok Pox	1,497	0.26	0
Janata Party	1,434	0.25	0
Samajwadi Party	205	0.04	0
Republican Party of India	177	0.03	0
Independents	105,108	18.25	3
Total	575,789	100.00	40
Valid votes	575,789	98.31	
Invalid/blank votes	9,889	1.69	
Total votes	585,678	100.00	
Registered voters/turnout	822,631	71.20	
Source: ECI

=== Results by constituency ===
Winner, runner-up, voter turnout, and victory margin in every constituency
Assembly Constituency		Turnout	Winner				Runner Up				Margin
#k	Names	%	Candidate	Party	Votes	%	Candidate	Party	Votes	%	Margin
1	Mandrem	77.16%	Parab Sangeeta Gopal	INC	6,989	50.12%	Khalap Ramakant Dattaram	MGP	6,356	45.58%	633
2	Pernem	77.46%	Kotkar Parshuram Nagesh	MGP	8,198	63.1%	Salgaonkar Shankar Kashinath	INC	3,919	30.16%	4,279
3	Dargalim	68.59%	Deu Mandrekar	MGP	5,915	62.12%	Bandekar Shambhu Bhau	INC	2,569	26.98%	3,346
4	Tivim	70.71%	Dayanand Narvekar	INC	11,299	70.06%	Naik Vinayak Vithal	MGP	3,672	22.77%	7,627
5	Mapusa	64.%	Surendra Sirsat	MGP	6,972	50.37%	Natekar Gurudas Bhalchandra	INC	6,488	46.88%	484
6	Siolim	73.17%	Chandrakant Chodankar	MGP	7,373	44.58%	Ashok Salgaonkar	INC	5,327	32.21%	2,046
7	Calangute	70.09%	Tomazinho Cardozo	INC	7,716	50.57%	Parulekar Suresh Vishwanath	Independent	3,746	24.55%	3,970
8	Saligao	75.36%	Wilfred de Souza	INC	6,479	45.5%	Kalangutkar Dilip Sonu	SS	5,184	36.41%	1,295
9	Aldona	68.78%	Fatima D'Sa	INC	8,303	46.65%	Ulhas Asnodkar	BJP	7,792	43.78%	511
10	Panaji	61.34%	Manohar Parrikar	BJP	4,600	44.42%	Prabhu Keshav Laximidhar	INC	3,534	34.13%	1,066
11	Taleigao	64.71%	Somnath Dattta Zuwarkar	INC	6,514	48.16%	Fernandes Nicholas Pedro	MGP	6,442	47.63%	72
12	St. Cruz	68.66%	Victoria Fernandes	Independent	5,971	35.77%	Gonsalves Victor Benjamin	INC	4,665	27.94%	1,306
13	St. Andre	70.44%	Pegado Carmo Rafael	INC	6,433	44.95%	Parvatkar Govind Bhikaji	BJP	4,056	28.34%	2,377
14	Cumbarjua	66.8%	Kuttikar Krishna Saju	INC	6,738	42.93%	Chodankar Dharma Vassudev	MGP	6,428	40.96%	310
15	Bicholim	75.57%	Pandurang Bhatale	INC	5,135	35.36%	Pandurang Raut	Independent	4,817	33.17%	318
16	Maem	75.35%	Shashikala Kakodkar	MGP	5,634	45.09%	Chopdekar Murari Sambha	Independent	2,370	18.97%	3,264
17	Pale	69.39%	Malik Sadanand Uttam	MGP	8,346	58.48%	Usgaonkar Vinaykuman Pundalik	INC	3,572	25.03%	4,774
18	Poriem	78.91%	Pratapsingh Rane	INC	7,268	50.93%	Rane Krishnarao Appasaheb	MGP	5,840	40.92%	1,428
19	Valpoi	77.25%	Narahari Haldankar	BJP	4,853	43.86%	Balkrishna Prabhu	INC	3,895	35.2%	958
20	Ponda	64.7%	Shivdas Verekar	MGP	6,931	42.38%	Aguiar Joild Joao	Independent	4,953	30.28%	1,978
21	Priol	76.89%	Dr.Kashinath Jalmi	MGP	7,982	45.1%	Verenkar Mohan Mahadev	Independent	6,640	37.51%	1,342
22	Marcaim	78.21%	Naik Shripad Yesso	BJP	9,775	56.9%	Naik Ravi Sitaram	INC	7,075	41.18%	2,700
23	Siroda	78.58%	Subhash Shirodkar	INC	6,257	37.65%	Naik Manohar Gopal	BJP	6,154	37.03%	103
24	Mormugao	58.38%	John Manuel Vaz	Independent	7,865	44.56%	Sheikh Hassan Haroon	INC	5,544	31.41%	2,321
25	Vasco Da Gama	60.5%	Mesouita Menezes Wilfred M.	MGP	6,460	38.24%	Simon Peter D'Souza	INC	4,867	28.81%	1,593
26	Cortalim	67.43%	Mauvin Heliodoro G. M.	INC	6,191	37.51%	Barbosa Luis Proto Alex	UGDP	3,132	18.98%	3,059
27	Loutolim	72.04%	Aleixo Sequeira	INC	6,846	54.35%	Radharao Gracias	UGDP	5,177	41.1%	1,669
28	Benaulim	71.62%	Churchill Alemao	UGDP	8,587	63.28%	Monte Cruz	INC	4,565	33.64%	4,022
29	Fatorda	64.34%	Cardoz Luis Alex Florence	INC	5,504	39.16%	Angle Ramakant Soiru	Independent	5,154	36.67%	350
30	Margao	63.72%	Digambar Kamat	BJP	5,009	40.66%	Naik Raju Damodar	INC	2,697	21.89%	2,312
31	Curtorim	70.23%	Gaonkar Antonio Damiao	UGDP	6,564	48.16%	Sardinha Cosmofrancisco Gaetano	INC	6,470	47.47%	94
32	Navelim	67.48%	Luizinho Faleiro	INC	8,178	51.98%	Pinto Nazario Jose	UGDP	5,296	33.66%	2,882
33	Velim	63.87%	Manu Fernandes	Independent	5,409	46.66%	Gracias Farrel Elvis	INC	2,932	25.29%	2,477
34	Cuncolim	66.55%	Arecio D'Souza	UGDP	5,294	39.71%	Shantaram Laxman Naik	INC	2,909	21.82%	2,385
35	Sanvordem	70.31%	Vishnu Prabhu	MGP	7,256	45.82%	Marathe Sadashiv Vaman	INC	5,580	35.24%	1,676
36	Sanguem	73.71%	Naik Pandu Vasu	INC	5,707	44.98%	Prabhu Desai Vivek Krishnanath	Independent	3,051	24.04%	2,656
37	Curchorem	68.81%	Domnic Fernandes	INC	7,989	50.31%	Adv. Dessai Narayan Mahadev	SS	3,163	19.92%	4,826
38	Quepem	73.75%	Prakash Velip	MGP	7,579	47.14%	Pereira Raul Roque	Independent	4,335	26.96%	3,244
39	Canacona	75.79%	Bandekar Sanjay Vimal	INC	6,178	52.58%	Naik Dessai Chandrakant Ram Alias Dr. Shaba Naik Gaonkar	MGP	4,881	41.54%	1,297
40	Poinguinim	79.97%	Govind Raghuchandra Acharya	MGP	4,516	43.59%	Gaonkar Vasu Paik	INC	3,400	32.82%	1,116
