= Telegram =

Message sent through telegraphy

A telegram is a written or printed message, originally sent through telegraphy. The use of the telegrams was popular for social and business correspondence in the latter half of the 19th and the first half of the 20th century. Even in the telephone age, the telegram remained popular, and spawned its own style of writing that in turn persisted in other media. Telegram services still exist today, though the popularity has largely waned, replaced by other forms of text communication.

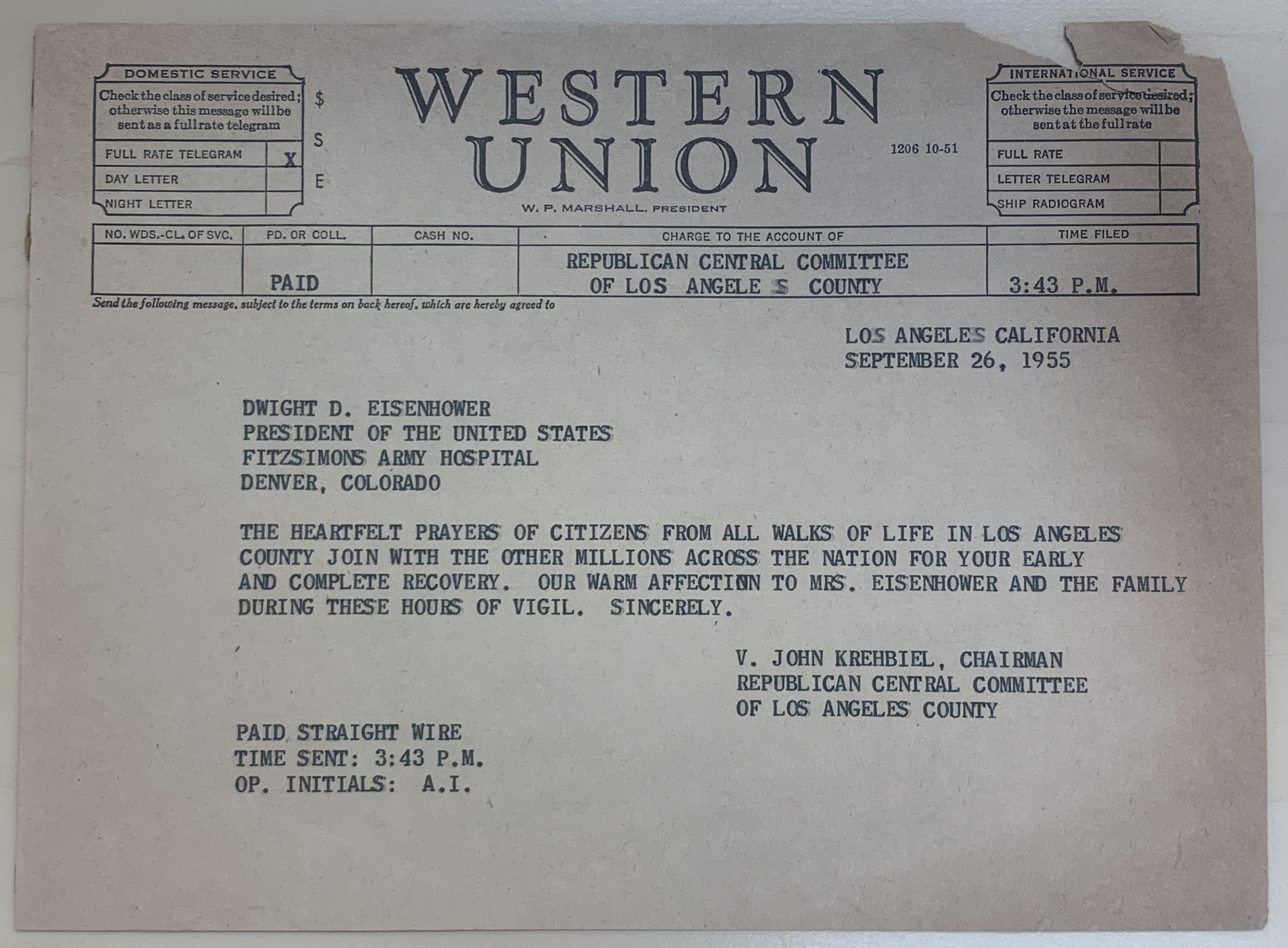
Western Union telegram sent to President Dwight Eisenhower wishing him a speedy recovery from his heart attack on Sept 26, 1955

== Terminology ==
Initially, telegrams were sent by an electrical telegraph operator or telegrapher using Morse code, or a printing telegraph operator using plain text. A cablegram was a message sent by a submarine telegraph cable, often shortened to "cable" or "wire". The suffix -gram is derived from ancient Greek: γραμμα (gramma), meaning something written, i.e. telegram means something written at a distance and cablegram means something written via a cable, whereas telegraph implies the process of writing at a distance.

== Delivery services ==
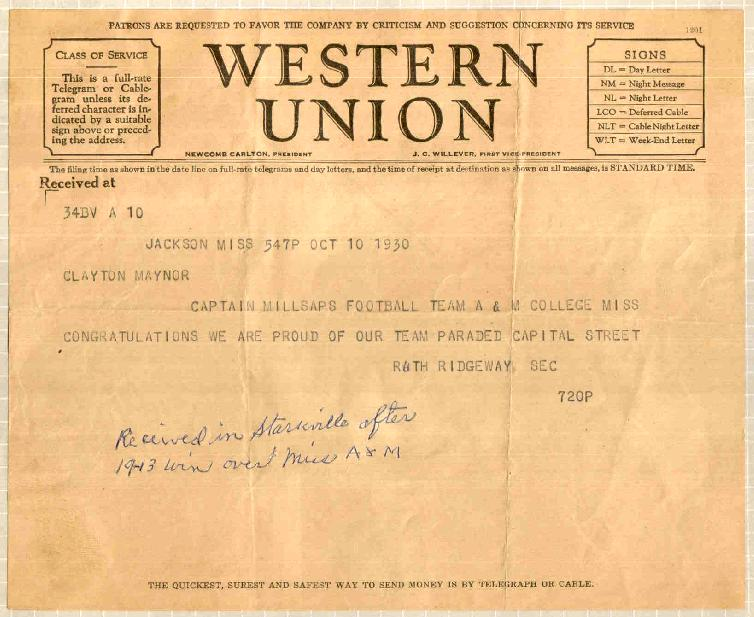
Western Union telegram (1930)

A telegram service is a company or public entity that delivers telegrams directly to the recipient. Telegram services were inaugurated after electric telegraphy became available.

Historically, telegrams were sent between a network of interconnected telegraph offices. A person visiting a local telegraph office paid by the word to have a message telegraphed to another office and delivered to the addressee on a paper form. Messages (i.e. telegrams) sent by telegraph could be delivered by telegraph messenger faster than mail. The electric telegraph freed communication from the time constraints of postal mail and revolutionized society and the global economy.

A decline that began with the growth of the use of the telephone was briefly postponed by the rise of special occasion congratulatory telegrams. Traffic continued to grow between 1867 and 1893 despite the introduction of the telephone in this period.

At their peak in 1929, an estimated 200 million telegrams were sent.

In 1919, the Central Bureau for Registered Addresses was established in the financial district of New York City. The bureau was created to ease the growing problem of messages being delivered to the wrong recipients. To combat this issue, the bureau offered telegraph customers the option to register unique code names for their telegraph addresses. Customers were charged $2.50 per year per code. By 1934, 28,000 codes had been registered.

Telegram services still operate in much of the world. However, e-mail and text messaging have rendered telegrams obsolete in many countries, and the number of telegrams sent annually has been declining rapidly since the 1980s. Where telegram services still exist, the transmission method between offices is no longer by telegraph, but by telex or IP link.

== Length and style ==
As telegrams have been traditionally charged by the word, messages were often abbreviated to pack information into the smallest possible number of words, in what came to be called "telegram style".

The average length of a telegram in the 1900s in the US was 11.93 words; more than half of the messages were 10 words or fewer. According to another study, the mean length of the telegrams sent in the UK before 1950 was 14.6 words or 78.8 characters. For German telegrams, the mean length is 11.5 words or 72.4 characters. At the end of the 19th century, the average length of a German telegram was calculated as 14.2 words.

== Derived uses ==
A diplomatic telegram is a confidential communication between a diplomatic mission and the foreign ministry of its parent country. These continue to be called telegrams or cables regardless of the method used for transmission.

== See also ==
- Familygram – Personal message sent to submariners
- Radiogram – Formal written message transmitted by radio
- Singing telegram – Message delivered in song
- Death notification telegram – Delivery of news of a death
- Telegram of condolence – Expression of sympathy
- Datagram – Basic data transfer unit associated with a packet-switched network
- Instagram – Social media platform owned by Meta
- Telegram.org – Cross-platform instant messaging service

== Sources ==
- Downey, Gregory J. (2002). Telegraph Messenger Boys: Labor, Technology, and Geography, 1850–1950. New York and London: Routledge.
- Frehner, Carmen (2008). Email, SMS, MMS: The Linguistic Creativity of Asynchronous Discourse in the New Media Age. Bern: Peter Lang AG. ISBN 978-303911451-1.
- James, Gleick (2011). The information : a history, a theory, a flood. Books on Tape. ISBN 978-0-307-91498-9. OCLC 689998325.
- Hochfelder, David (2012). The Telegraph in America, 1832–1920. The Johns Hopkins University Press. ISBN 978-1-42140747-0.
- Kieve, Jeffrey L. (1973). The Electric Telegraph: A Social and Economic History. David and Charles. ISBN 0-7153-5883-9. OCLC 655205099.
- Phillips, Ronnie J. (June 2000). "Digital technology and institutional change from the gilded age to modern times: The impact of the telegraph and the internet". Journal of Economic Issues. 34 (2): 267–89. Archived from the original on 8 August 2020.
- Smith, Richard E. (2015). Elementary Information Security. Jones & Bartlett Publishers. ISBN 1284055949.
- Standage, Tom (2007). "Afterword". The Victorian Internet. Walker & Co. ISBN 978-0-802-71879-2.
