= Kanakumbi =

Village in Karnataka, India

Kanakumbi Kanakumbi
- Village
- Country: India
- State: Karnataka
- District: Belagavi
- Talukas: Khanapur

Languages
  - Official: Kannada
- Time zone: UTC+5:30 (IST)

Kanakumbi is a village in Belagavi district in Karnataka, India. It is situated on the border of Satteri taluka, Goa. Nearby cities are Belagavi city 45 km, Mapusa 65 km, and Panaji 71 km.

This village is located at the Karnataka and Goa border. Kannada, Marathi and Konkani are the commonly used languages; Kannada is the official language.

It is surrounded by a number of tourist spots. Lush green and numerous waterfalls is how this place looks during monsoon.

The Maadaayi (Maha Tayi or Great Mother in Kannada) stream originates from this village and so does the Malaprabha river.
