= Writing =

Persistent representation of language

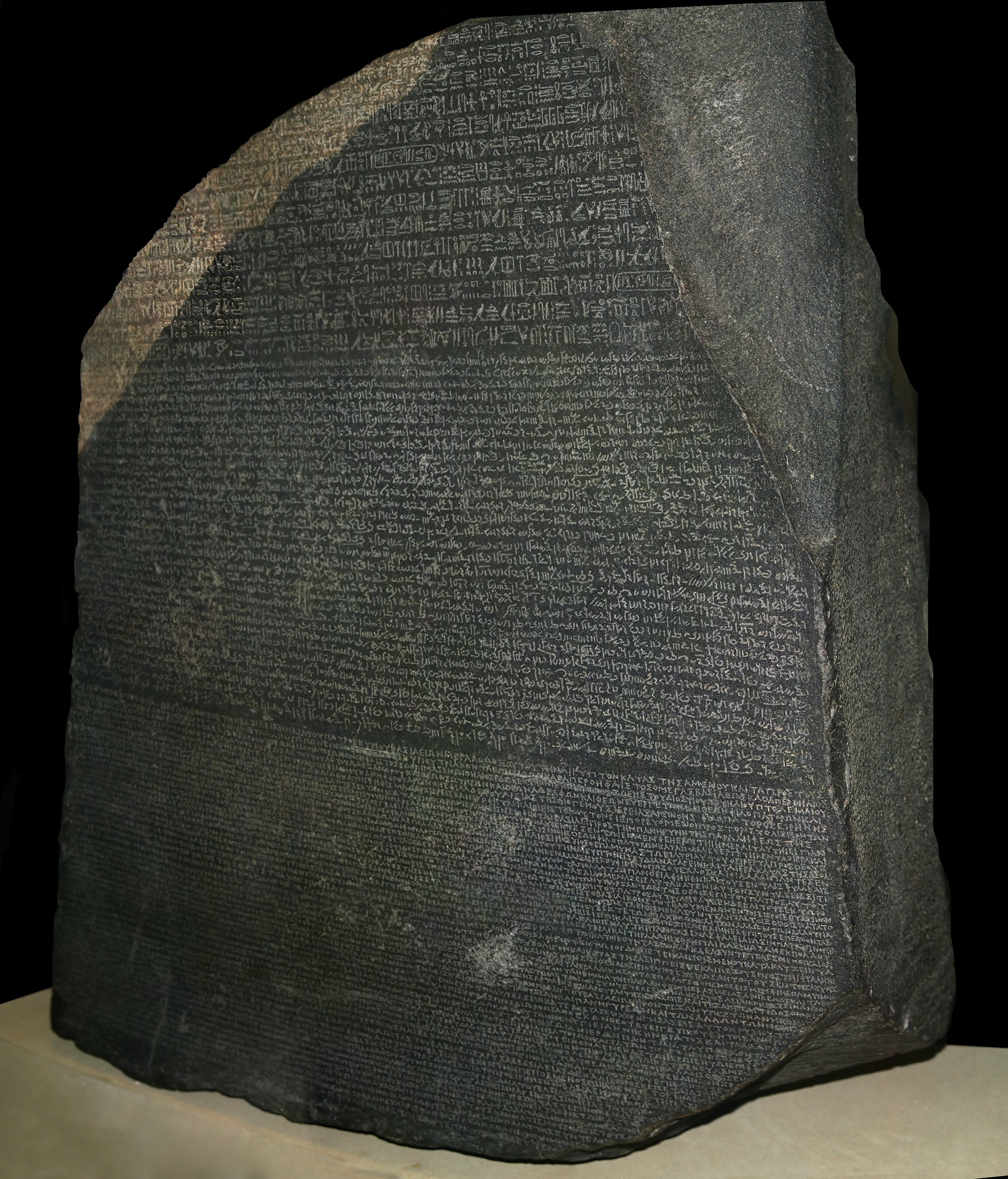
The Rosetta Stone (196 BC) bears writing in three different scripts. Hieroglyphs (top) and Demotic (middle) record the same text in the Egyptian language, while an equivalent passage in Greek uses the Greek alphabet (bottom). These correspondences were key to the decipherment of Egyptian hieroglyphs in the early 19th century.

Writing is the act of creating a persistent, usually visual representation of language on a surface. As a structured system of communication, writing is also known as written language. Historically, written languages have emerged as a way to record corresponding spoken languages. A particular set of symbols, called a script, as well as the rules by which they encode a particular spoken language, is known as a writing system. In some rare cases, writing may be tactile rather than visual.

The cognitive and social activity of writing involves neuropsychological and physical processes whose physical output is also called writing (or a text): a series of physically inscribed, mechanically transferred, or digitally represented symbols. Reading is the activity of encountering a text and construing its symbols. Literacy is the ability of reading and writing.

In general, writing systems do not constitute languages in and of themselves, but rather a durable means of representing language such that it can be understood by people at a later time. While the use of language is universal across human societies, most spoken languages are not written. Those with a writing system can complement and extend the capacities of spoken language, transmitting it across space (e.g. written correspondence) and storing it for future reading (e.g. libraries). Writing can also change people's relationships with the knowledge they acquire, since it allows humans to externalize their thinking in forms that are easier to reflect on, process more slowly, elaborate on, reconsider, and revise.

== Tools, materials, and motivations to write ==
Any instance of writing involves a complex interaction among available tools, intentions, cultural customs, cognitive routines, genres, tacit and explicit knowledge, and the constraints and limitations of the systems used. Writing implements used to make physical inscriptions include fingers, styluses, ink brushes, pencils, pens, and many styles of lithography; writing surfaces on which inscriptions may be made include stone tablets, clay tablets, bamboo slips, papyrus, wax tablets, vellum, parchment, paper, copperplate, and slate.

The typewriter, as well as the digital word processor, allow individual writers to produce visually consistent text mechanically via a keyboard.

Early advancements in natural language processing and natural language generation resulted in software capable of producing certain forms of highly formulaic writing (e.g. weather forecasts, brief summaries of sporting events, and financial-market overviews) without the direct involvement of humans after initial configuration. Later developments found broader applications in writing support, such as generating initial drafts, producing feedback with the help of a rubric, copy-editing, and helping translation. Most recently, software such as generative pre-trained transformers can, when provided with a prompt, generate longer and plausibly register-appropriate texts without additional human input.

=== Motivations and purposes ===
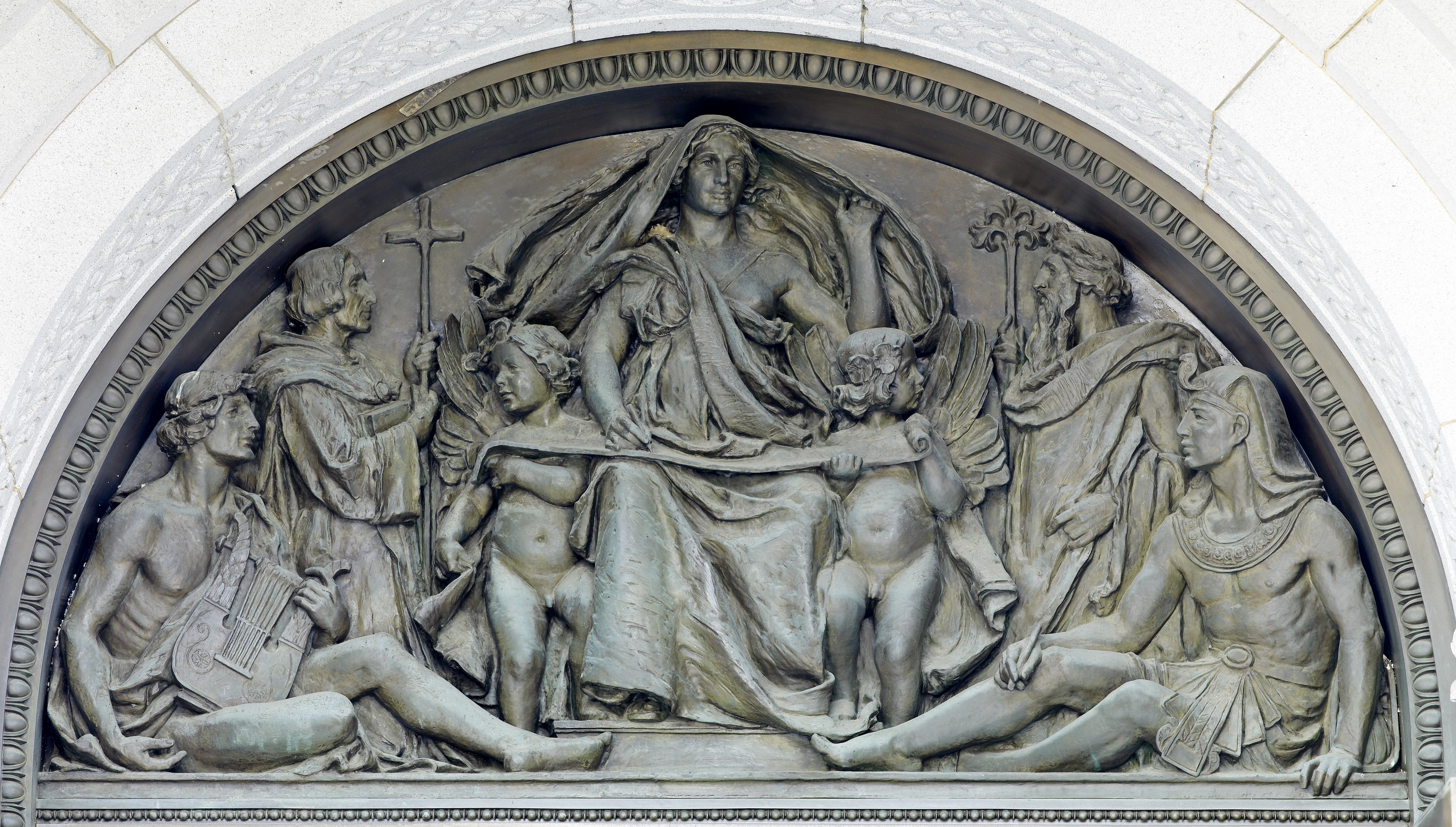
Bronze tympanum featuring the personification of Writing – Thomas Jefferson Building, Washington, D.C.

Historically, writing emerged to address the needs of societies growing in economic and social complexity. Once developed, potential applications included tracking produce and other wealth, recording history, maintaining culture, codifying knowledge through curricula as well as lists of texts deemed to contain foundational knowledge (e.g. The Canon of Medicine) or artistic value (e.g. the literary canon). Aids to administration included legal codes, census records, contracts, deeds of ownership, taxation, trade agreements, and treaties. As Charles Bazerman explains, the "marking of signs on stones, clay, paper, and now digital memories—each more portable and rapidly traveling than the previous—provided means for increasingly coordinated and extended action as well as memory across larger groups of people over time and space." Further innovations included more uniform, predictable, and widely dispersed legal systems, the distribution of accessible versions of sacred texts, and furthering practices of scientific inquiry and knowledge management, all of which were largely reliant on portable and easily reproducible forms of inscribed language. The history of writing is co-extensive with uses of writing and the elaboration of activity systems that give rise to and circulate writing.

Individual motivations for writing include the ability to operate beyond the limitations of one's own memory (e.g. to-do lists, recipes, reminders, logbooks, maps, directions for complicated tasks or rituals), dissemination of ideas and coordination (e.g. essays, monographs, broadsides, plans, petitions, manifestos), creativity and storytelling, maintaining kinship and other social networks, business correspondence regarding goods and services, and life writing (e.g. a diary or journal).

The global spread of digital communication systems such as email and social media has made writing an increasingly important feature of daily life, where these systems mix with older technologies like paper, pencils, whiteboards, printers, and copiers. Substantial amounts of everyday writing characterize most workplaces in developed countries. In many occupations (e.g. law, accounting, software design, human resources), written documentation is not only the main deliverable but also the mode of work itself. Even in occupations not typically associated with writing, routine records management has most employees writing at least some of the time.

== Contemporary uses ==
Some professions are typically associated with writing, such as literary authors, journalists, and technical writers, but writing is pervasive in most modern forms of work, civic participation, household management, and leisure activities.

=== Business and finance ===
Writing permeates everyday commerce. For example, in the course of an afternoon, a wholesaler might receive a written inquiry about the availability of a product line, then communicate with suppliers and fabricators through work orders and purchase agreements, correspond via email to affirm shipping availability with a drayage company, write an invoice, and request proof of receipt in the form of a written signature. At a larger scale, modern systems of finances, banking, and business rest on written documents – including regulations, policies, and procedures; the creation of reports and other monitoring documents to make, evaluate, and provide accountability for decisions and operations; the creation and maintenance of records; internal written communications within departments to coordinate work; written communications that comprise work products presented to other departments and to clients; and external communications to clients and the public. Business and financial organizations also rely on many written legal documents, such as contracts, reports to government agencies, tax records, and accounting reports. Financial institutions and markets that hold, transmit, trade, insure, or regulate holdings for clients or other institutions are particularly dependent on written records (though now often in digital form) to maintain the integrity of their roles.

=== Governance and law ===
Many modern systems of government are organized and sanctified through written constitutions at the national and sometimes state or other organizational levels. Written rules and procedures typically guide the operations of the various branches, departments, and other bodies of government, which regularly produce reports and other documents as work products and to account for their actions. In addition to legislatures that draft and pass laws, these laws are administered by an executive branch, which can present further written regulations specifying the laws and how they are carried out. Governments at different levels also typically maintain written records on citizens concerning identities, life events such as births, deaths, marriages, and divorces, the granting of licenses for controlled activities, criminal charges, traffic offences, and other penalties small and large, and tax liability and payments.

=== Science and scholarship ===
Research undertaken in academic disciplines is typically published as articles in journals or within book-length monographs. Arguments, experiments, observational data, and other evidence collated in the course of research is represented in writing, and serves as the basis for later work. Data collection and drafting of manuscripts may be supported by grants, which usually require proposals establishing the value of such work and the need for funding. The data and procedures are also typically collected in lab notebooks or other preliminary files. Preprints of potential publications may also be presented at academic or disciplinary conferences or on publicly accessible web servers to gain peer feedback and build interest in the work. Prior to official publication, these documents are typically read and evaluated by peer review from appropriate experts, who determine whether the work is of sufficient value and quality to be published.

Publication does not establish the claims or findings of work as being authoritatively true, only that they are worth the attention of other specialists. As the work appears in review articles, handbooks, textbooks, or other aggregations, and others cite it in the advancement of their own research, does it become codified as contingently reliable knowledge.

=== Journalism ===
News and news reporting are central to citizen engagement and knowledge of many spheres of activity people may be interested in about the state of their community, including the actions and integrity of their governments and government officials, economic trends, natural disasters and responses to them, international geopolitical events, including conflicts, but also sports, entertainment, books, and other leisure activities. While news and newspapers have grown rapidly from the eighteenth to the twentieth centuries, the changing economics and ability to produce and distribute news have brought about radical and rapid challenges to journalism and the consequent organization of citizen knowledge and engagement. These changes have also created challenges for journalism ethics that have been developed over the past century.

=== Education and educational institutions ===
Formal education is the social context most strongly associated with the learning of writing, and students may carry these particular associations long after leaving school. Alongside the writing that students read (in the forms of textbooks, assigned books, and other instructional materials as well as self-selected books) students do much writing within schools at all levels, on subject exams, in essays, in taking notes, in doing homework, and in formative and summative assessments. Some of this is explicitly directed toward the learning of writing, but much is focused more on subject learning.

== Relationship with spoken and signed language ==
The relationship between spoken, written, and signed modes of language, as modeled by Beatrice Primus et al. While many spoken or signed languages are not written, there are no written languages without a spoken counterpart that they originally emerged to record.

Writing, speech, and signing are three distinct modalities of language; each has unique characteristics and conventions. When discussing properties common to the modes of language, the individual speaking, signing, or writing will be referred to as the sender, and the individual listening, viewing, or reading as the receiver; senders and receivers together will be collectively termed agents. The spoken, signed, and written modes of language mutually influence one another, with the boundaries between conventions for each being fluid – particularly in informal written contexts like taking quick notes or posting on social media.

Spoken and signed language is typically more immediate, reflecting the local context of the conversation and the emotions of the agents, often via paralinguistic cues like body language. Utterances are typically less premeditated, and are more likely to feature informal vocabulary and shorter sentences. They are also primarily used in dialogue, and as such include elements that facilitate turn-taking; these including prosodic features such as trailing off and fillers that indicate the sender has not yet finished their turn. Errors encountered in spoken and signed language include disfluencies and hesitation.

By contrast, written language is typically more structured and formal. While speech and signing are transient, writing is permanent. It allows for planning, revision, and editing, which can lead to more complex sentences and a more extensive vocabulary. Written language also has to convey meaning without the aid of tone of voice, facial expressions, or body language, which often results in more explicit and detailed descriptions.

While a speaker can typically be identified by the quality of their voice, the author of a written text is often not obvious to a reader only analyzing the text itself. Writers may nevertheless indicate their identity via the graphical characteristics of their handwriting.

Written languages generally change more slowly than their spoken or signed counterparts. As a result, the written form of a language may retain archaic features or spellings that no longer reflect contemporary speech. Over time, this divergence may contribute to a dynamic of diglossia.

=== Grammar ===
There are too many grammatical differences to address, but here is a sample. In terms of clause types, written language is predominantly declarative (e.g. It's red.) and typically contains fewer imperatives (e.g. Make it red.), interrogatives (e.g. Is it red?), and exclamatives (e.g. How red it is!) than spoken or signed language. Noun phrases are generally predominantly third person, but they are even more so in written language. Verb phrases in spoken English are more likely to be in simple aspect than in perfect or progressive aspect, and almost all of the past perfect verbs appear in written fiction.

=== Information packaging ===
Information packaging is the way that information is packaged within a sentence, that is the linear order in which information is presented. For example, On the hill, there was a tree has a different informational structure than There was a tree on the hill. While, in English, at least, the second structure is more common, the first example is relatively much more common in written language than in spoken language. Another example is that a construction like it was difficult to follow him is relatively more common in written language than in spoken language, compared to the alternative packaging to follow him was difficult. A final example, again from English, is that the passive voice is relatively more common when writing than when speaking.

=== Vocabulary ===
Written language typically has higher lexical density than spoken or signed language, meaning there is a wider range of vocabulary used and individual words are less likely to be repeated. It also includes fewer first and second-person pronouns and fewer interjections. Written English has fewer verbs and more nouns than spoken English, but even accounting for that, verbs like think, say, know, and guess appear relatively less commonly with a content clause complement (e.g. I think that it's OK.) in written English than in spoken English.

== Classification of writing systems ==
Writing systems may be broadly classified according to what units of language are generally represented by its symbols:

- Phonographies represent sounds of speech – with alphabets and syllabaries using symbols for phonemes and syllables respectively.
- Logographies represent a language's units of meaning (words or morphemes), though still associated by readers with their given pronunciations in the corresponding spoken language.

=== Logographies ===
Comparative evolution from pictograms to abstract character shapes, in Mesopotamian cuneiforms, Egyptian hieroglyphs and Chinese characters

A logography is written using logograms – written characters which represent individual words or morphemes. Many logograms have internal structures, with components potentially representing both phonographic and ideographic (e.g. Chinese character radicals, hieroglyphic determinatives) aspects of the morpheme.

The main logographic system in use is Chinese characters, used primarily to write the Chinese languages and Japanese, and historically others from regions influenced by Chinese culture, such as Korean and Vietnamese. Other logographic systems include cuneiform and Maya script.

=== Syllabaries ===
A syllabary is a set of written symbols that represent syllables, typically a consonant followed by a vowel, or just a vowel alone. In some scripts more complex syllables (e.g. consonant–vowel–consonant or consonant–consonant–vowel) may have dedicated glyphs. Phonetically similar syllables are not written similarly.

Syllabaries are best suited to languages with a relatively simple syllable structure, such as Japanese. Other syllabic scripts include Linear B and the Cherokee syllabary.

=== Alphabets ===
An alphabet is a set of written symbols that represent consonants and vowels.

==== Abjads ====
Alphabets that generally only have letters for consonants are called abjads or consonantaries; though optional, abjads may also use diacritical marks to specify which vowels follow each consonant. The earliest alphabets were abjads, influenced by symbols representing specific consonants that originated in Egyptian hieroglyphs. Most abjads are likewise native to the Middle East, reflecting the relatively limited variation of vowels in the morphology of the Semitic languages spoken in the region.

==== Abugidas ====
In most of the alphabets of India and Southeast Asia, vowels are indicated through diacritics or modification of the shape of the consonant. These are called abugidas or alphasyllabaries. The term abugida is derived from the names of the initial letters in the Geʽez script, another prominent abugida used to write several languages in Ethiopia and Eritrea.

== History and origins ==
=== Overview of origins ===
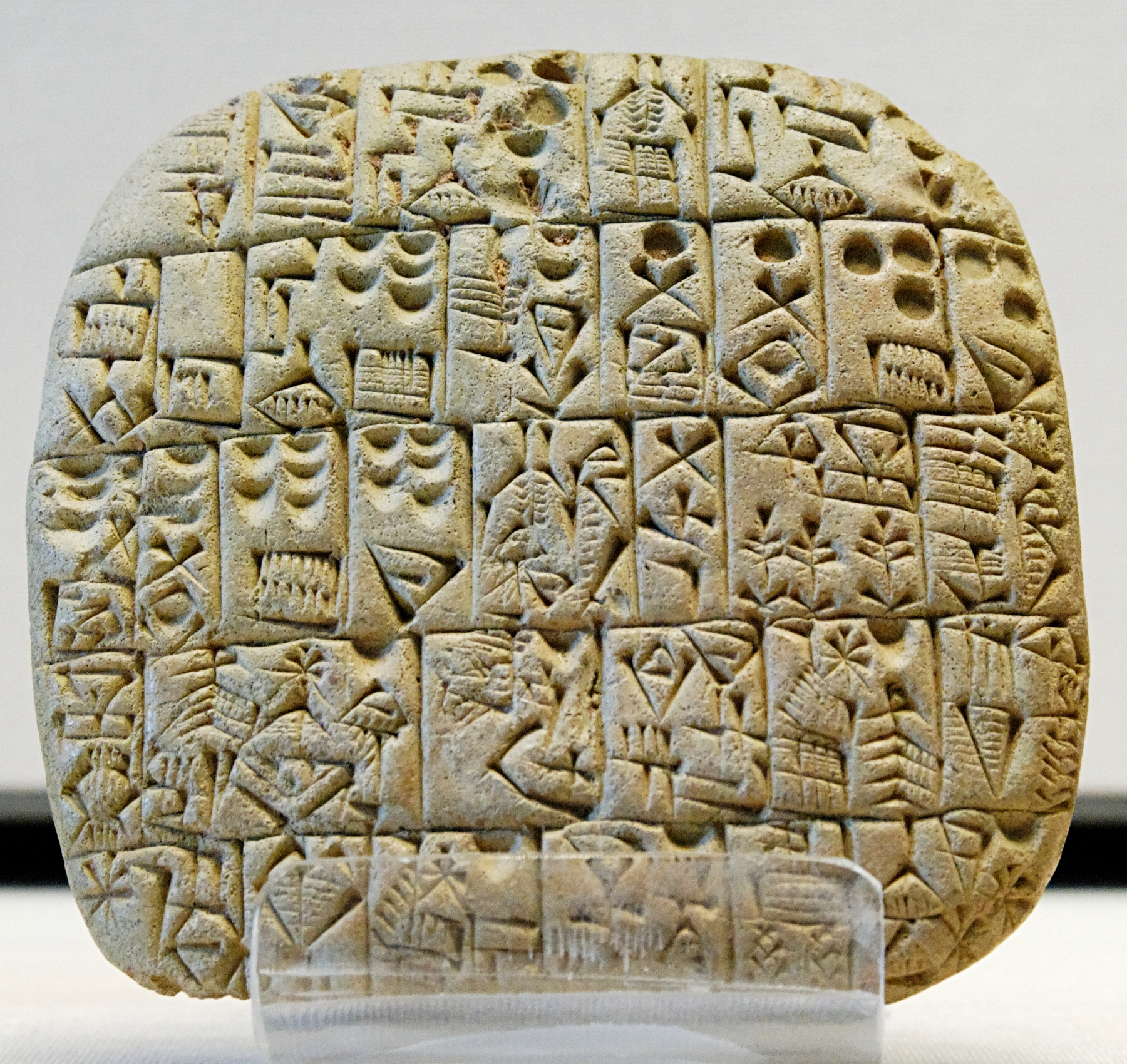
A clay tablet with cuneiform writing

Writing developed independently in a handful of different locations in the Early Bronze Age, namely Mesopotamia and Ancient Egypt (c. 3200 – c. 3100 BC), Ancient China (c. 1250 BC), and Mesoamerica (c. 1 AD). Scholars mark the difference between prehistory and history (recorded history) with the invention of the first written languages. The first writing can be dated back to the Neolithic era, with clay tablets being used to keep track of livestock and commodities. The first example of written language can be dated to the Sumerian city of Uruk, at the end of the 4th millennium BC. An ancient Mesopotamian poem tells a tale about the invention of writing:

Because the messenger's mouth was heavy and he couldn't repeat, the Lord of Kulaba patted some clay and put words on it, like a tablet. Until then, there had been no putting words on clay.

— Enmerkar and the Lord of Aratta (c. 1800 BC)

Writing first emerged to meet the growing economic needs of the city-states of Sumer, located in southern Mesopotamia. During this time, the complexity of trade and administration outgrew the power of memory, with Sumerian cuneiform used to write the Sumerian language serving as a reliable means for recording transactions, maintaining financial accounts, and keeping historical records, among similar activities. Cuneiform was pictographic (based in representative pictures) at first, but later evolved into an alphabet that used a series of wedge-shaped signs to represent language phonemically.

Cuneiform was followed relatively quickly by Egyptian hieroglyphs, with both emerging from proto-writing systems between 3400 and 3100 BC, with the earliest coherent texts from c. 2600 BC. The Indus script (c. 2600 – c. 2000 BC), found on different types of artefacts produced by the Indus Valley Civilization on the Indian subcontinent, remains undeciphered, and whether it functioned as true writing is not agreed upon. While its origins are not visually obvious, the opportunity for Mesopotamian cultural diffusion to have introduced the concept of writing to the Indus peoples is clear.

=== Mesopotamia ===
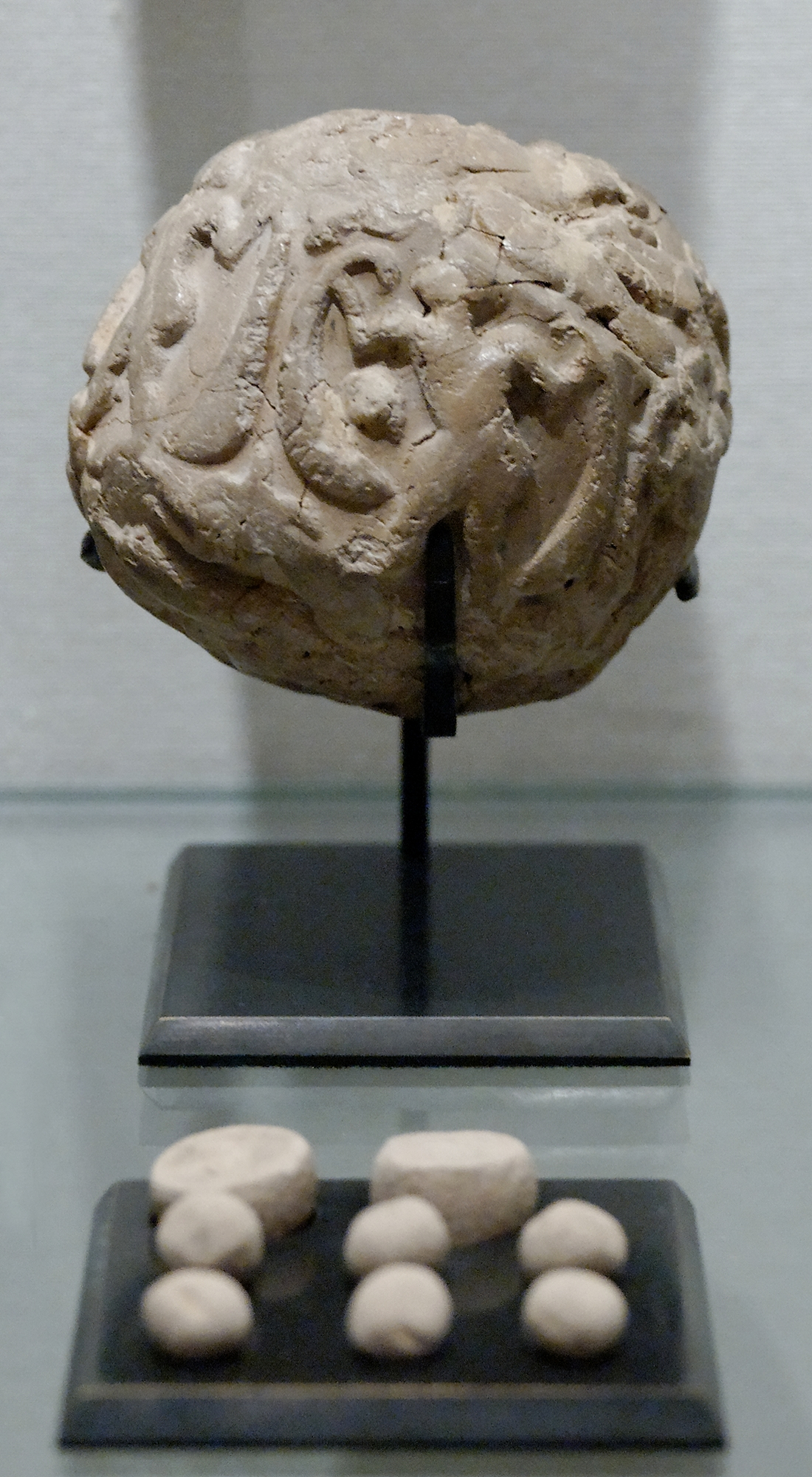
Globular envelope with a cluster of accountancy tokens, Uruk period, from Susa – Louvre Museum

In the 1970s, archaeologist Denise Schmandt-Besserat presented a theory establishing a link between cuneiform and previously uncategorized clay "tokens", the oldest of which have been found in the Zagros region of Iran. Around 8000 BC, Mesopotamians began using clay tokens to count their agricultural and manufactured goods. Later they began placing these tokens inside large, hollow clay containers (bulla, or globular envelopes) which were then sealed. The quantity of tokens in each container came to be expressed by impressing, on the container's surface, one picture for each instance of the token inside. They next dispensed with the tokens, relying solely on symbols for the tokens, drawn on clay surfaces. To avoid making a picture for each instance of the same object (for example: 100 pictures of a hat to represent 100 hats), they counted the objects by using various small marks.

Cuneiform (from Latin cuneus, lit. 'wedge') emerged c. 3200 BC in the context of this technology for keeping accounts. By the end of the 4th millennium BC, the Mesopotamians were using a triangular-shaped stylus pressed into soft clay to record numbers. This system was gradually augmented with using a sharp stylus to indicate what was being counted by means of pictographs. Round and sharp styluses were gradually replaced with wedge-shaped styluses, at first only recording logograms – with phonetic elements introduced by the 29th century BC to represent syllables in Sumerian, resulting in a general purpose writing system.

From the 26th century BC, cuneiform was adapted to write the East Semitic Akkadian language (Assyrian and Babylonian) which had spread across southern Mesopotamia – and then to others such as Elamite, Hattian, Hurrian and Hittite. Scripts similar in appearance to this writing system include those for Ugaritic and Old Persian. With the adoption of Aramaic as the lingua franca of the Neo-Assyrian Empire (911–609 BC), Old Aramaic was also adapted to Mesopotamian cuneiform. The latest cuneiform texts in Akkadian discovered thus far date from the 1st century AD.

=== Egypt ===
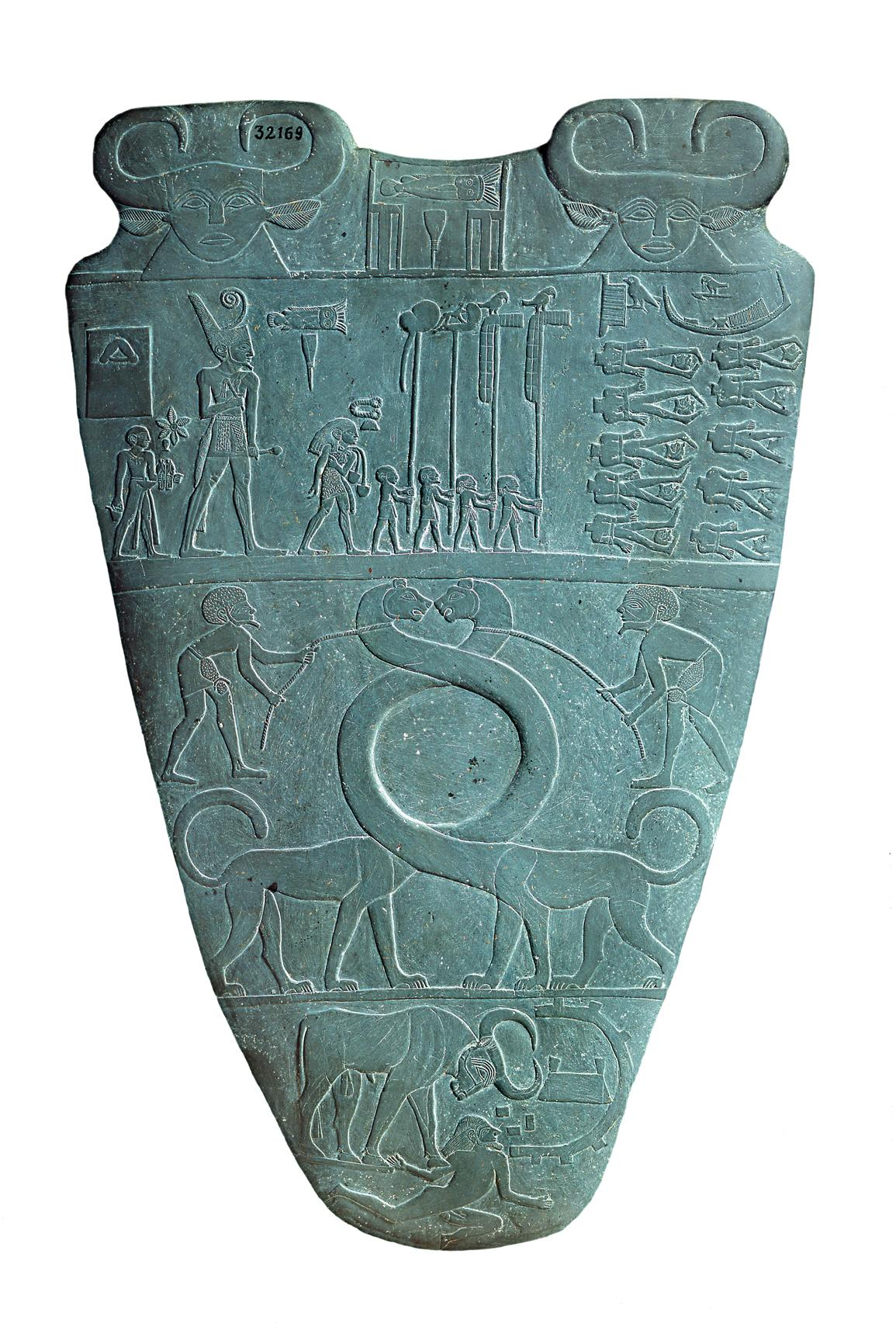
The Narmer Palette, depicting two monstrous serpopards representing unification of Upper and Lower Egypt, c. 3100 BC

At roughly the same time, the system of Egyptian hieroglyphs was developing in the Nile valley, also evolving from pictographic proto-writing to include phonemic elements. The Indus Valley civilization developed a form of writing known as the Indus script c. 2600 BC, although its precise nature remains undeciphered. The Chinese script, one of the oldest continuously used writing systems in the world, originated around the late 2nd millennium BC, evolving from oracle bone script used for divination purposes, although the apparent maturity of the oracle bone script suggests it may have been in use as early as several hundred years prior.

The earliest known hieroglyphs (a word from Greek, lit. 'sacred writing') are clay labels for the Predynastic ruler "Scorpion I", dated c. the 33nd century BC and recovered at Abydos (modern Umm el-Qa'ab) – or otherwise the Narmer Palette, dated c. 3100 BC. The hieroglyphic script was logographic, with phonetic adjuncts that included an effective alphabet. The oldest deciphered sentence is attested on a seal impression from the tomb of Seth-Peribsen at Abydos, dating to the Second Dynasty (28th or 27th century BC). Around 800 hieroglyphs were used during the Old, Middle, and New Kingdom periods (2686–1077 BC); by the Greco-Roman period (30 BC – 642 AD), more than 5,000 distinct glyphs are attested.

Writing was important in maintaining the Egyptian empire, and literacy in the difficult system of hieroglyphs was concentrated among an educated elite of scribes serving temple, pharaonic, and military authorities.

=== Mesoamerica ===
Of several pre-Columbian scripts in Mesoamerica, the one that appears to have been best developed, and the only one to be deciphered, is the Maya script. The earliest inscription identified as Maya dates to the 3rd century BC. Maya writing used around 800 distinct symbols – mainly logograms, complemented by a set of syllabograms used for affixes, disambiguation between different readings of a logogram, or the substitution of certain logograms entirely.

=== China ===
The earliest surviving examples of writing in China – inscriptions on oracle bones, usually tortoise plastrons and ox scapulae which were used for divination – date from c. 1200 BC, during the Late Shang period. A small number of bronze inscriptions from the same period have also survived.

=== Elamite scripts ===
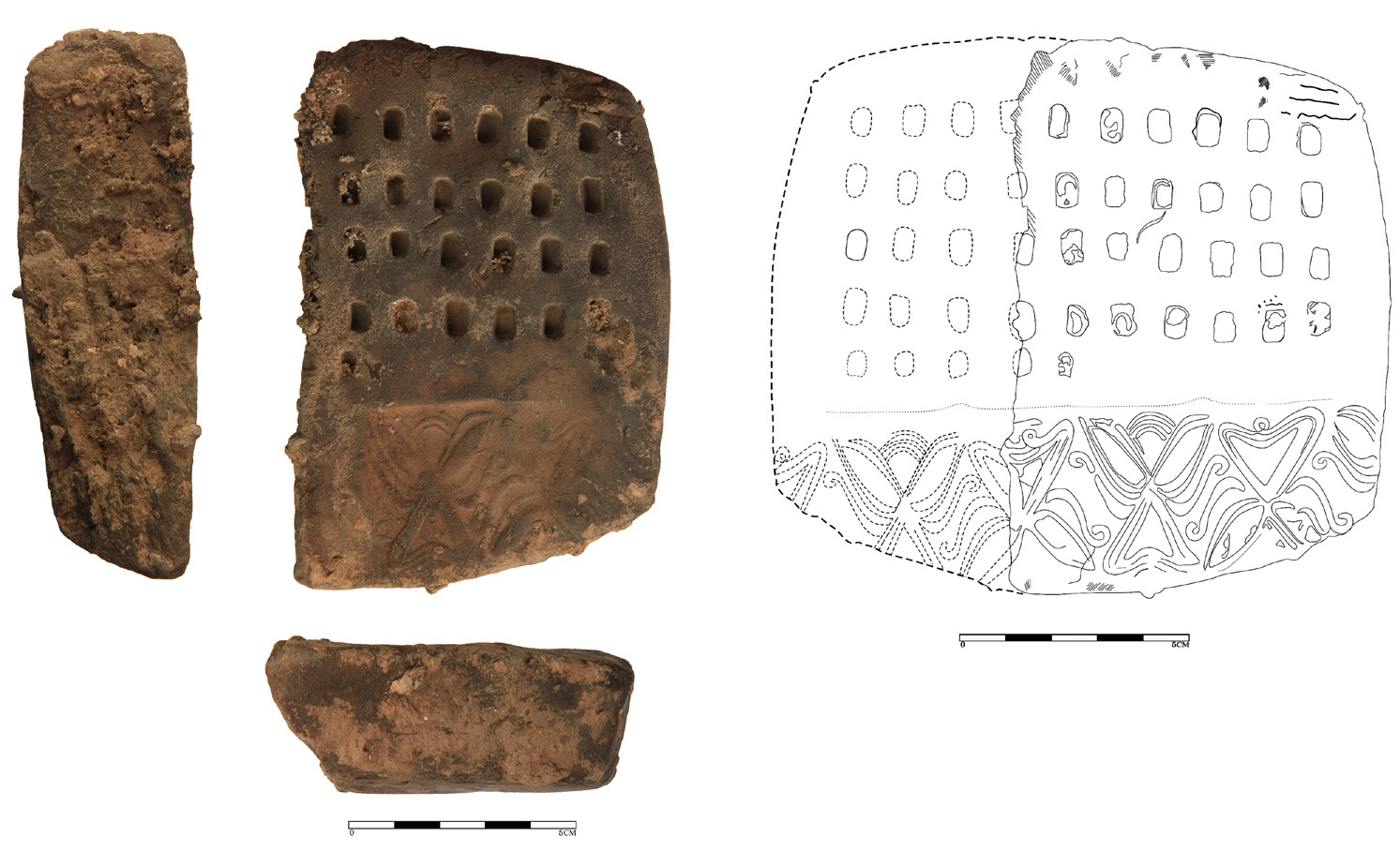
Proto-Elamite tablets from Shahr-i Sokhta

The Proto-Elamite script, in use c. 3200 – c. 2900 BC, is attested on clay tablets found at different sites across modern-day Iran, with the majority having been excavated at Susa, an ancient city located east of the Tigris. The script is thought to have been partly logographic, to have developed from early cuneiform, and to have used more than 1,000 signs – though its inscriptions "have been, and will remain, highly problematic in a discussion of writing because they represent a very unclear period of literacy".

The Elamite cuneiform script, used c. 2500 – 331 BC, was adapted from cuneiform as was used to write Akkadian. At any given point during this period, Elamite cuneiform used around 130 symbols – with a total of 206 used across its entire lifespan, far fewer than in most other cuneiform scripts.

=== Aegean systems ===
Prior to the invention of the Greek alphabet during the Iron Age, Cretan hieroglyphs are attested on artefacts from Crete during the early-to-mid 2nd millennium BC. Linear B, the writing system of the Mycenaean Greeks, was used in Knossos on Crete as well as the Greek mainland c. 1450−1200 BC. Linear A, yet to be deciphered, was used in the Aegean Islands and the mainland c. 1800–1450 BC.

=== Development of the alphabet ===
The alphabet is only known to have been invented once in human history, by a community of Canaanite turquoise miners in the Sinai Peninsula c. 1800 BC to write West Semitic languages, "in the context of cultural exchanges between Semitic-speaking people from the Levant and communities in Egypt". This earliest attested form is known as the Proto-Sinaitic script, and it adapted concepts and at least some of its written letterforms from Egyptian hieroglyphic writing; it adopted wholly West Semitic sound values for its letters, as opposed to adapting existing Egyptian ones. Precise dating of its origin, as well as the graphical origins of many letterforms (if any) remain unclear, and the script remains undeciphered. Around 30 crude inscriptions have been found at a mountainous Egyptian mining site known as Serabit el-Khadem, with symbols that stood for single consonant sounds rather than whole words or concepts – the basis of an alphabetic system. It was not until between the 12th and 9th centuries BC that use of the alphabet became widespread.

The Phoenician alphabet (c. 1050 BC) is a direct descendant of Proto-Sinaitic. Proto-Sinaitic and Phoenician were abjads which only had letters representing consonantal sounds; Phoenician was ultimately adapted into the Greek alphabet (c. 800 BC), the first to represent vowel sounds, which it did by re-purposing unused Phoenician consonantal signs. The Cumae alphabet, a variant of the early Greek alphabet, gave rise to the Etruscan alphabet and its own descendants, such as the Latin alphabet. Other descendants from the Greek alphabet include Cyrillic, used to write languages such as Bulgarian and Russian. The Phoenician alphabet was also adapted into the Aramaic script, from which the West Asian Square Hebrew, Arabic, and South Asian Brahmic scripts are descended.

=== Religious texts ===
In the history of writing, religious texts or writing have played a special role. For example, some religious text compilations have been some of the earliest popular texts, or even the only written texts in some languages, and in some cases are still highly popular around the world.

== Influence on society ==
The development and use of written language has had profound impacts on human societies, influencing everything from social organization and cultural identity to technology and the dissemination of knowledge. Plato (c. 427 – 348 BC), through the voice of Socrates, expressed concerns in the dialogue Phaedrus that a reliance on writing would weaken one's ability to memorize and understand, as written words would "create forgetfulness in the learners' souls, because they will not use their memories". He further argued that written words, being unable to answer questions or clarify themselves, are inferior to the living, interactive discourse of oral communication.

Written language facilitates the preservation and transmission of culture, history, and knowledge across time and space, allowing societies to develop complex systems of law, administration, and education. For example, the invention of writing in ancient Mesopotamia enabled the creation of detailed legal codes, like the Code of Hammurabi. The advent of digital technology has revolutionized written communication, leading to the emergence of new written genres and conventions, such as interactions via social media. This has implications for social relationships, education, and professional communication.

=== Literacy and social mobility ===
Literacy is the ability to read and write. From a graphemic perspective, this ability requires the capability of correctly recognizing or reproducing graphemes, the smallest units of written language. Literacy is a key driver of social mobility. Firstly, it underpins success in formal education, where the ability to comprehend textbooks, write essays, and interact with written instructional materials is fundamental. High literacy skills can lead to better academic performance, opening doors to higher education and specialized training opportunities.

In the job market, proficiency in written language is often a determinant of employment opportunities. Many professions require a high level of literacy, from drafting reports and proposals to interpreting technical manuals. The ability to effectively use written language can lead to higher paying jobs and upward career progression.

Literacy enables additional ways for individuals to participate in civic life, including understanding news articles and political debates to navigating legal documents. However, disparities in literacy rates and proficiency with written language can contribute to social inequalities. Socio-economic status, race, gender, and geographic location can all influence an individual's access to quality literacy instruction. Addressing these disparities through inclusive and equitable education policies is crucial for promoting social mobility and reducing inequality.

=== Marshall McLuhan's perspective ===
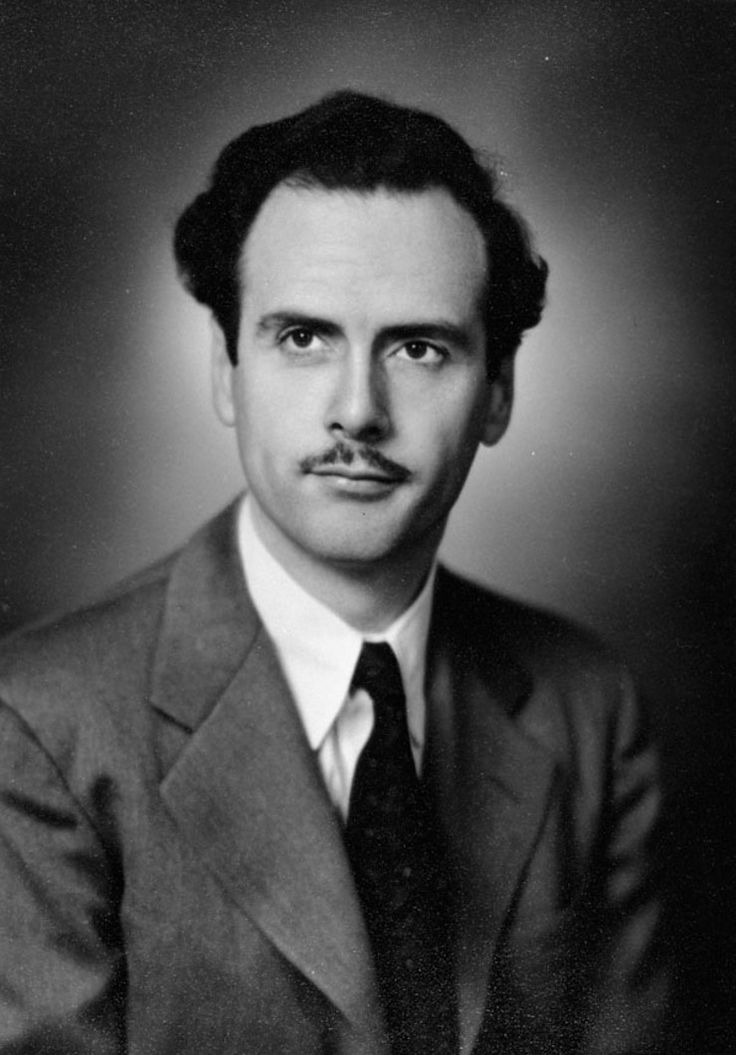
Marshall McLuhan

The Canadian philosopher Marshall McLuhan (1911–1980) primarily presented his ideas about written language in The Gutenberg Galaxy (1962). Therein, McLuhan argued that the invention and spread of the printing press, and the shift from oral tradition to written culture that it spurred, fundamentally changed the nature of human society. This change, he suggested, led to the rise of individualism, nationalism, and other aspects of modernity.

McLuhan proposed that written language, especially as reproduced in large quantities by the printing press, contributed to a linear and sequential mode of thinking, as opposed to the more holistic and contextual thinking fostered by oral cultures. He associated this linear mode of thought with a shift towards more detached and objective forms of reasoning, which he saw as characteristic of the modern age. Furthermore, he theorized about the effects of different media on human consciousness and society. He famously asserted that "the medium is the message", meaning that the form of a medium embeds itself in any message it would transmit or convey, creating a symbiotic relationship by which the medium influences how the message is perceived.

While McLuhan's ideas are influential, they have also been critiqued and debated. Some scholars argue that he overemphasized the role of the medium (in this case, written language) at the expense of the content of communication. It has also been suggested that his theories are overly deterministic, not sufficiently accounting for the ways in which people can use and interpret media in varied ways.

=== Diglossia and digraphia ===
Diglossia is a sociolinguistic phenomenon where two distinct varieties of a language – often one spoken and one written – are used by a single language community in different social contexts.

The "high variety", often the written language, is used in formal contexts, such as literature, formal education, or official communications. This variety tends to be more standardized and conservative, and may incorporate older or more formal vocabulary and grammar. The "low variety", often the spoken language, is used in everyday conversation and informal contexts. It is typically more dynamic and innovative, and may incorporate regional dialects, slang, and other informal language features.

Diglossic situations are common in many parts of the world, including the Arab world, where the high Modern Standard Arabic variety coexists with other, low varieties of Arabic local to specific regions. Diglossia can have significant implications for language education, literacy, and sociolinguistic dynamics within a language community.

Analogously, digraphia occurs when a language may be written in different scripts. For example, Serbian may be written using either the Cyrillic or Latin script, while Hindustani may be written in Devanagari or the Urdu alphabet.

== Orthography ==
Writing systems can be broadly classified into several types based on the units of language they correspond with: namely logographic, syllabic, and alphabetic. They are distinct from phonetic transcriptions with technical applications, which are not used as writing as such. For example, notation systems for signed languages like SignWriting been developed, but it is not universally agreed that these constitute a written form of the sign language in themselves.

Orthography comprises the rules and conventions for writing a given language, including how its graphemes are understood to correspond with speech. In some orthographies, there is a one-to-one correspondence between phonemes and graphemes, as in Serbo-Croatian and Finnish. These are known as shallow orthographies. In contrast, orthographies like that of English and French are considered deep orthographies due to the complex relationships between sounds and symbols. For instance, in English, the phoneme /f/ can be represented by the graphemes ⟨f⟩ as in ⟨fish⟩, ⟨ph⟩ as in ⟨phone⟩, or ⟨gh⟩ as in ⟨enough⟩.

Orthographies also include rules about punctuation, capitalization, word breaks, and emphasis. They may also include specific conventions for representing foreign words and names, and for handling spelling changes to reflect changes in pronunciation or meaning over time.

== See also ==
- Book of John
- Collaborative writing
- Graphonomics
- Penmanship
- Word
- Writer's block
- Writing circle
- Writing slate
- Writing therapy
