= 1989 Goa Legislative Assembly election =

Election in Indian state

- 22 November 1989

All 40 seats in the Goa Legislative Assembly 21 seats needed for a majority
- Turnout: 72.47% (▼0.61%)
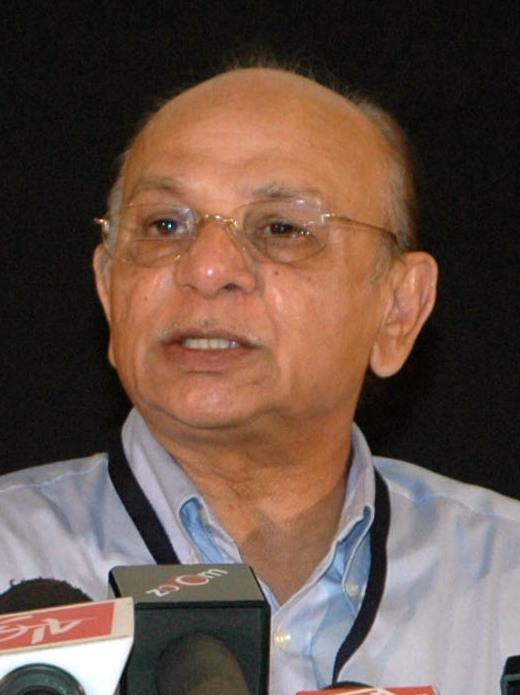
	Majority party	Minority party
		MGP
Leader	Pratapsingh Rane
Party	INC	MGP
Last election	18 seats	8 seats
Seats won	20	18
Seat change	▲2	▲10
Popular vote	204321	195533
Percentage	40.52%	38.78%
Swing	▲1.04%	▲17.66%
CM before election
Pratapsingh Rane
INC
Elected CM
Pratapsingh Rane
INC

Legislative Assembly elections were held in Goa on 11 November 1989 to elect all 40 members of the Goa Legislative Assembly.

== Results ==
Party	Votes	%	Seats
Indian National Congress	204,321	40.52	20
Maharashtrawadi Gomantak Party	195,533	38.78	18
Gomantak Lok Party	15,894	3.15	0
Janata Dal	7,045	1.40	0
Shiv Sena	4,960	0.98	0
Communist Party of India	2,882	0.57	0
Bhartiya Janata Party	1,985	0.39	0
Gomantak Bahujan Samaj Parishad	896	0.18	0
Janata Party	246	0.05	0
Communist Party of India (Marxist)	105	0.02	0
Independents	70,338	13.95	2
Total	504,205	100.00	40
Valid votes	504,205	97.64	
Invalid/blank votes	12,207	2.36	
Total votes	516,412	100.00	
Registered voters/turnout	712,562	72.47	
Source: ECI

=== Results by constituency ===
Winner, runner-up, voter turnout, and victory margin in every constituency
Assembly Constituency		Turnout	Winner				Runner Up				Margin
#k	Names	%	Candidate	Party	Votes	%	Candidate	Party	Votes	%	Margin
1	Mandrem	78.79%	Ramakant Khalap	MGP	6,900	52.61%	Porobo Sangita Gopal	INC	5,619	42.84%	1,281
2	Pernem	74.6%	Salgoankar Shankar Kashinath	MGP	7,074	62.%	Talevnekar Raju Bapu	INC	3,545	31.07%	3,529
3	Dargalim	70.08%	Deu Mandrekar	MGP	6,544	74.52%	Bandekar Shambhu Bhau	INC	1,119	12.74%	5,425
4	Tivim	70.83%	Naik Vinayak Vitthal	MGP	6,797	48.18%	Maulingkar Premnath Arjun	INC	4,764	33.77%	2,033
5	Mapusa	67.08%	Surendra Sirsat	MGP	5,769	43.92%	D Souza Francies C. J. A.	Independent	3,612	27.5%	2,157
6	Siolim	73.44%	Ashok Salgaonkar	MGP	6,438	45.17%	Chandrakant Chodankar	INC	6,425	45.08%	13
7	Calangute	72.95%	Parulekar Suresh Vishwanath	INC	7,182	50.42%	Malik Surikant Keshav	MGP	6,946	48.76%	236
8	Saligao	75.86%	Wilfred de Souza	INC	6,229	50.98%	Ahrenkar Punaji Pandurang	MGP	5,802	47.49%	427
9	Aldona	70.65%	Ratnakar Chopdekar	MGP	8,208	50.82%	Dayanand Narvekar	INC	7,875	48.76%	333
10	Panaji	64.29%	Joan Gonsalves	INC	3,983	39.63%	Pushpashil Krishna Kerkar	MGP	2,915	29.%	1,068
11	Taleigao	66.22%	Somnath Dattta Zuwarkar	INC	5,034	44.51%	Ramesh Raghuvir Silimkhan	MGP	3,655	32.32%	1,379
12	St. Cruz	67.54%	Victor Benamin Gonsalves	INC	5,729	41.03%	Victoria Romeo Fernandes	Gomantak Lok Pox	4,432	31.74%	1,297
13	St. Andre	71.01%	Carmo Rafael Andre Jose Pegado	Independent	5,097	40.29%	Amilkar Adelino Alvares	INC	3,727	29.46%	1,370
14	Cumbarjua	71.52%	Dharma Vassudeo Chodankar	MGP	5,645	38.51%	Nirmala P. Sawant	INC	5,189	35.4%	456
15	Bicholim	74.83%	Pandurang Raut	MGP	6,465	50.74%	Harish Zantye	INC	4,897	38.43%	1,568
16	Maem	75.44%	Shashikala Kakodkar	MGP	7,218	64.33%	Parab Gaonkar Manohar Gangaram	INC	2,606	23.22%	4,612
17	Pale	67.46%	Usgonkar Vinay Kumar Pundlik	MGP	8,009	62.33%	Verenkar Chandrakant Vishwanath	INC	2,821	21.95%	5,188
18	Poriem	77.14%	Pratapsingh Rane	INC	7,231	57.99%	Rane Krishnarao Appasaheb	MGP	5,126	41.11%	2,105
19	Valpoi	76.19%	Balkrishna Prabhu	INC	5,436	54.91%	Desai Baburao Harijirao	MGP	4,306	43.49%	1,130
20	Ponda	66.59%	Shivdas Verekar	MGP	6,212	43.33%	Naik Mohan Govind	INC	4,267	29.76%	1,945
21	Priol	76.23%	Dr.Kashinath Jalmi	MGP	11,766	72.55%	Satkar Babal Babuso	INC	4,013	24.75%	7,753
22	Marcaim	75.08%	Naik Ravi Sitaram	MGP	6,561	43.3%	Sham Mahanandu Naik	INC	4,910	32.4%	1,651
23	Siroda	74.83%	Subhash Shirodkar	INC	6,046	42.18%	Naik Ramdas Topyo	MGP	5,761	40.19%	285
24	Mormugao	57.5%	Sheikh Hassan Haroon	INC	5,394	37.47%	John Manuel Vaz	MGP	5,182	36.%	212
25	Vasco Da Gama	60.75%	Simon Peter D'Souza	INC	5,045	36.91%	Menezas Mesquita Wilfred	MGP	4,720	34.54%	325
26	Cortalim	72.21%	Godinho Mauvin	INC	5,953	40.08%	Valadares Francisco	Independent	5,117	34.46%	836
27	Loutolim	67.7%	Barbosa Luis Proto Aleixo	INC	4,073	37.4%	Fernandes Sedy Antonio	Independent	3,958	36.35%	115
28	Benaulim	74.5%	Alimno Churchil Braz	INC	9,196	70.44%	Pinto Nazario Jose	Independent	3,642	27.9%	5,554
29	Fatorda	68.92%	Cardoz Luis Alex Florence	INC	5,552	44.79%	Lotlikar Suryakant Datta	MGP	3,687	29.75%	1,865
30	Margao	66.19%	Naik Ananta Narcinva	Independent	6,447	51.11%	Kamat Digambar Vasant	INC	5,995	47.53%	452
31	Curtorim	69.49%	Francisco Sardinha	INC	8,876	68.5%	Barbosa Agostinho Sevastiao	JD	3,936	30.38%	4,940
32	Navelim	-	Luizinho Faleiro	INC	Elected Unopposed						
33	Velim	64.67%	Farrel Furtado	INC	8,962	78.54%	Rodrigues Gabriel Minguel	JD	2,256	19.77%	6,706
34	Cuncolim	67.15%	Manu Fernandes	INC	4,243	33.1%	Dessai Shebu Babali	MGP	3,192	24.9%	1,051
35	Sanvordem	71.05%	Mohan Amshekar	MGP	8,737	59.22%	Desaimadhavrao Shivajirao	INC	5,388	36.52%	3,349
36	Sanguem	75.26%	Prabhu Desai Ranu Anant	MGP	7,092	58.07%	Pandu Vasu Naik	INC	4,509	36.92%	2,583
37	Curchorem	75.27%	Domnic Fernandes	INC	8,059	54.2%	Prabhu Desai Anil Hari	MGP	6,683	44.94%	1,376
38	Quepem	74.13%	Prakash Velip	MGP	9,229	63.06%	Gauns Desai Voikunt Govind	INC	4,919	33.61%	4,310
39	Canacona	73.26%	Bandekar Sanjay Vimal	MGP	5,938	56.55%	Fernandes Joao Jose Joaquim S.	Independent	2,608	24.84%	3,330
40	Poinguinim	75.52%	Vasu Paik Gaonkar	INC	4,192	47.06%	Govind Raghuchandra Acharya	SS	4,107	46.11%	85

== See also ==
- Goa Legislative Assembly
- Elections in Goa
