= Pernem Assembly constituency =

Legislative Assembly constituency in Goa State, India

Coordinates: 15.72°N 73.80°E

Pernem
- Constituency No. 2 for the Goa Legislative Assembly

Constituency details
- Country: India
- Region: Western India
- State: Goa
- District: North Goa
- Lok Sabha constituency: North Goa
- Established: 1963
- Total electors: 33,212
- Reservation: SC

Member of Legislative Assembly
- 8th Goa Legislative Assembly
- Incumbent Pravin Prabhakar Arlekar
- Party: Bharatiya Janata Party

Pernem is one of the 40 Goa Legislative Assembly constituencies of the state of Goa in southern India. Pernem is also one of the 20 constituencies falling under North Goa Lok Sabha constituency. Pernem constituency is reserved for candidates belonging to the Scheduled Castes.

== Members of the Legislative Assembly ==
Year	Member	Party
1963	Kashinath Shetgaonkar	Maharashtrawadi Gomantak Party
1967	K. B. Laxman	Maharashtrawadi Gomantak Party
1972	Rane Jaisingrao Abasaheb	Maharashtrawadi Gomantak Party
1977	Deu Mandrekar	Maharashtrawadi Gomantak Party
1980	Deu Mandrekar	Maharashtrawadi Gomantak Party
1984	Shambhu Bandekar	Maharashtrawadi Gomantak Party
1989	Kashinath Salgoankar	Maharashtrawadi Gomantak Party
1994	Nagesh Kotkar	Maharashtrawadi Gomantak Party
1999	Jitendra Deshprabhu	Indian National Congress
2002	Jitendra Deshprabhu	Indian National Congress
2007	Dayanand Sopte	Bharatiya Janata Party
2012	Rajendra Arlekar	Bharatiya Janata Party
2017	Manohar Ajgaonkar	Maharashtrawadi Gomantak Party
*2019	Manohar Ajgaonkar	Bharatiya Janata Party
2022	Pravin Arlekar	Bharatiya Janata Party

- Defection from MGP to BJP

== Election results ==
=== 2027 Assembly election ===
2027 Goa Legislative Assembly election: Pernem
Party	Candidate	Votes	%	±%
INC				
NDA				
NOTA	None of the above			
Majority				
Turnout				
gain from		Swing		

=== Assembly Election 2022 ===
2022 Goa Legislative Assembly election : Pernem
Party	Candidate	Votes	%	±%
BJP	Pravin Arlekar	13,063	44.47%	▲9.44
MGP	Rajan Babuso Korgaonkar	9,645	32.83%	▼23.95
RGP	Sujay D. Mhapsekar	2,755	9.38%	New
INC	Jitendra Yeshwant Gaonkar	1,827	6.22%	▲2.57
Independent	Vishnudas Korgaonkar	862	2.93%	New
NOTA	None of the Above	363	1.24%	▼0.46
AAP	Pundalik Dhargalkar	273	0.93%	▼0.18
SS	Subhash Barkelo Kerkar	223	0.76%	New
Margin of victory		3,418	11.64%	▼10.11
Turnout		29,375	86.84%	▲0.02
Registered electors		33,212		▲5.91
BJP gain from MGP		Swing	▼12.31	

=== Assembly Election 2017 ===
2017 Goa Legislative Assembly election : Pernem
Party	Candidate	Votes	%	±%
MGP	Manohar Ajgaonkar	15,745	56.78%	New
BJP	Rajendra Arlekar	9,715	35.03%	▼28.21
INC	Vikesh Ramesh Assotikar	1,013	3.65%	▼27.39
NOTA	None of the Above	469	1.69%	New
AAP	Shivanand Krishna Pilarnkar	308	1.11%	New
Goa Vikas Party	Gopaldas Anant Arlekar	180	0.65%	New
Margin of victory		6,030	21.75%	▼10.46
Turnout		27,730	88.42%	▲0.54
Registered electors		31,360		▲6.25
MGP gain from BJP		Swing	▼6.47	

=== Assembly Election 2012 ===
2012 Goa Legislative Assembly election : Pernem
Party	Candidate	Votes	%	±%
BJP	Rajendra Arlekar	16,406	63.25%	▲16.76
INC	Manohar Ajgaonkar	8,053	31.04%	▲0.19
Independent	Subhash Barkelo Kerkar	824	3.18%	New
Independent	Sakharam Vishram Korgaonkar	192	0.74%	New
Margin of victory		8,353	32.20%	▲16.57
Turnout		25,940	87.72%	▲7.04
Registered electors		29,515		▲52.54
BJP hold		Swing	▲16.76	

=== Assembly Election 2007 ===
2007 Goa Legislative Assembly election : Pernem
Party	Candidate	Votes	%	±%
BJP	Dayanand Sopte	7,272	46.48%	▲14.86
INC	Deshprabhu Jitendra Raghuraj	4,827	30.86%	▼17.32
MGP	Teli Apa	2,873	18.36%	▲1.02
SS	Gawandi Hanumant	249	1.59%	▲0.24
Independent	Sanjay Krishnarao Prabhu Dessai	183	1.17%	New
JD(S)	Smita Bharat Petkar	122	0.78%	New
Margin of victory		2,445	15.63%	▼0.93
Turnout		15,644	80.69%	▲3.65
Registered electors		19,349		▲6.18
BJP gain from INC		Swing	▼1.69	

=== Assembly Election 2002 ===
2002 Goa Legislative Assembly election : Pernem
Party	Candidate	Votes	%	±%
INC	Deshprabhu Jitendra Raghuraj	6,778	48.18%	▲6.86
BJP	Dayanand Raghunath Sopate	4,449	31.62%	▲9.37
MGP	Deshprabhu Vasudeo Rajendra	2,440	17.34%	▼14.58
SS	Petkar Bharat Ramchandra	190	1.35%	▼3.15
Independent	Ajgaonkar Bablo Atmaram	185	1.31%	New
Margin of victory		2,329	16.55%	▲7.16
Turnout		14,069	77.06%	▲4.48
Registered electors		18,223		▲6.76
INC hold		Swing	▲6.86	

=== Assembly Election 1999 ===
1999 Goa Legislative Assembly election : Pernem
Party	Candidate	Votes	%	±%
INC	Deshprabhu Jitendra Raghuraj	5,129	41.32%	New
MGP	Kotkar Parshuram Nagesh	3,963	31.93%	▼30.35
BJP	Prabhu Dessai Uday Dattram	2,762	22.25%	New
SS	Polji Chandrashekhar Prabhakar	559	4.50%	New
Margin of victory		1,166	9.39%	▼23.11
Turnout		12,413	72.72%	▼5.76
Registered electors		17,069		▲1.76
INC gain from MGP		Swing	▼20.96	

=== Assembly Election 1994 ===
1994 Goa Legislative Assembly election : Pernem
Party	Candidate	Votes	%	±%
MGP	Kotkar Parshuram Nagesh	8,198	62.28%	▲1.87
INC	Salgaonkar Shankar Kashinath	3,919	29.77%	New
Independent	Gawandi Baban Ganesh	243	1.85%	New
Independent	Korgaonkar Ratikant Shankar	213	1.62%	New
BSP	Asolkar Arjun Atmaram	176	1.34%	New
UGDP	Adv. Prakash Mahadev Govekar	98	0.74%	New
Margin of victory		4,279	32.51%	▲2.37
Turnout		13,164	77.46%	▲1.91
Registered electors		16,773		▲9.67
MGP hold		Swing	▲1.87	

=== Assembly Election 1989 ===
1989 Goa Legislative Assembly election : Pernem
Party	Candidate	Votes	%	±%
MGP	Salgoankar Shankar Kashinath	7,074	60.40%	New
INC	Talevnekar Raju Bapu	3,545	30.27%	
Independent	Raul Vassudev Sakharam	255	2.18%	New
Gomantak Bahujan Samaj Parishad	Assolkar Arjun Atmaram	181	1.55%	New
Independent	Deshparbhu Anantrao	168	1.43%	New
SS	Kamulkar Vijay Maruti	142	1.21%	New
Margin of victory		3,529	30.13%	▲30.00
Turnout		11,711	74.60%	▲4.93
Registered electors		15,294		▼9.38
MGP gain from INC		Swing	▲21.96	

=== Assembly Election 1984 ===
1984 Goa, Daman and Diu Legislative Assembly election : Pernem
Party	Candidate	Votes	%	±%
INC	Bandekar Shambhu Bhavti	4,648	38.44%	New
MGP	Pednekar Mahohar	4,632	38.31%	
Independent	Mandrekar Deu Gunaji	1,216	10.06%	New
Independent	Nipanikar Balaram Vishnu	416	3.55%	New
BJP	Panchwadker Mukund Ganesh	260	2.22%	New
Independent	Pawar Durgadas Tukaram	201	1.72%	New
Independent	Harijan Bablo Dhondgo	190	1.62%	New
Margin of victory		16	0.13%	▼25.51
Turnout		12,091	68.51%	▲10.68
Registered electors		16,878		▲9.41
INC gain from MGP		Swing	▼11.55	

=== Assembly Election 1980 ===
1980 Goa, Daman and Diu Legislative Assembly election : Pernem
Party	Candidate	Votes	%	±%
MGP	Deu Mandrekar	4,701	49.99%	▲0.65
INC(I)	Morajkar Ramdas Shankar	2,290	24.35%	New
JP	Rau Narayan Bhicaji	1,118	11.89%	New
Independent	Nipanikar Balaram Vishnu	542	5.76%	New
Independent	Harijan Kashiram Ganpat	398	4.23%	New
Margin of victory		2,411	25.64%	▲0.98
Turnout		9,404	58.66%	▲8.28
Registered electors		15,427		▲0.81
MGP hold		Swing	▲0.65	

=== Assembly Election 1977 ===
1977 Goa, Daman and Diu Legislative Assembly election : Pernem
Party	Candidate	Votes	%	±%
MGP	Deu Mandrekar	3,978	49.34%	▼10.80
INC	Morajkar Ramdas Shankar	1,990	24.68%	New
JP	Arickar Vishwanath Norsoba	1,487	18.44%	New
Independent	Amonkar Janardan Arjun	217	2.69%	New
Independent	Nipanikar Balaram Vishnu	156	1.94%	New
Independent	Pednekar Shantaram Purshottam	80	0.99%	New
Margin of victory		1,988	24.66%	▼4.43
Turnout		8,062	51.68%	▼21.06
Registered electors		15,303		▲23.92
MGP hold		Swing	▼10.80	

=== Assembly Election 1972 ===
1972 Goa, Daman and Diu Legislative Assembly election : Pernem
Party	Candidate	Votes	%	±%
MGP	Rane Jaisingrao Abasaheb	5,477	60.15%	New
INC	Deshprabhu Raghunathrao	2,828	31.06%	New
MGP	Gad Shrikant Krishna	190	2.09%	New
UGP	S. R. Prabhu Desai	151	1.66%	New
CPI(M)	Rau Gopinath Vaman	116	1.27%	New
Independent	Kotar Bablo Pandurang	74	0.81%	New
ABJS	Shivnath Baburao Valke	47	0.52%	New
Margin of victory		2,649	29.09%	
Turnout		9,106	71.93%	
Registered electors		12,349		
MGP hold		Swing		

=== Assembly By-election 1971 ===
1971 Goa Legislative Assembly by-election : Pernem
Party	Candidate	Votes	%	±%
MGP	K. B. Laxman	6,806		
INC	P. A. Jairam	1,993 #DIV/0!		New
CPI	D. N. Atmaram	123 #DIV/0!		New
INC(O)	B. S. Vinayak	90 #DIV/0!		New
Margin of victory		4,813		
MGP hold		Swing		

=== Assembly Election 1967 ===
1967 Goa, Daman and Diu Legislative Assembly election : Pernem
Party	Candidate	Votes	%	±%
MGP	K. B. Laxman	4,499	55.76%	New
Independent	B. Desprabhu	2,181	27.03%	New
UGP	P. O. S. Govind	346	4.29%	New
PSP	D. S. Govindrao	169	2.09%	New
Independent	P. D. N. Yeshwant	146	1.81%	New
Independent	N. D. S. Jagannath	89	1.10%	New
Independent	T. N. Swar	26	0.32%	New
Margin of victory		2,318	28.73%	
Turnout		8,069	64.22%	
Registered electors		11,647		
MGP win (new seat)				

== See also ==
- List of constituencies of the Goa Legislative Assembly
- North Goa district
- Dargalim (Goa Assembly constituency)
