= Dargalim Assembly constituency =

Former constituency of the Goa Legislative Assembly, in India

Coordinates: 15.68°N 73.84°E

Dargalim
- Former constituency for the Goa Legislative Assembly

Constituency details
- Country: India
- Region: Western India
- State: Goa
- District: North Goa
- Lok Sabha constituency: North Goa
- Established: 1989
- Abolished: 2008
- Reservation: None

Dargalim was one of the 40 Goa Legislative Assembly constituencies of the state of Goa in southern India. Dargalim was also one of the 20 constituencies falling under North Goa Lok Sabha constituency.

== Members of the Legislative Assembly ==
Election	Member	Party
1989	Deu Mandrekar	Maharashtrawadi Gomantak Party
1994	Deu Mandrekar	Maharashtrawadi Gomantak Party
1999	Manohar Ajgaonkar	Indian National Congress
2002	Manohar Ajgaonkar	Bharatiya Janata Party
2007	Manohar Ajgaonkar	Indian National Congress

== Election results ==
=== Assembly Election 2007 ===
2007 Goa Legislative Assembly election : Dargalim
Party	Candidate	Votes	%	±%
INC	Manohar Ajgaonkar	5,049	38.71%	▲15.06
BJP	Morajkar Vithu	4,275	32.77%	▼41.26
MGP	Parwar Kishor	3,465	26.56%	▲24.31
RPI(A)	Korgaonkar Sakharam Vishram	233	1.79%	New
Margin of victory		774	5.93%	▼44.45
Turnout		13,044	79.67%	▲6.83
Registered electors		16,345		▲4.29
INC gain from BJP		Swing	▼35.32	

=== Assembly Election 2002 ===
2002 Goa Legislative Assembly election : Dargalim
Party	Candidate	Votes	%	±%
BJP	Manohar Ajgaonkar	8,467	74.03%	▲41.99
INC	Dhargalkar Balkrishna Atmaram	2,705	23.65%	▼19.26
MGP	Amonkar Janardhan Arjun	258	2.26%	▼16.92
Margin of victory		5,762	50.38%	▲39.51
Turnout		11,437	72.93%	▲4.72
Registered electors		15,672		▲6.06
BJP gain from INC		Swing	▲31.12	

=== Assembly Election 1999 ===
1999 Goa Legislative Assembly election : Dargalim
Party	Candidate	Votes	%	±%
INC	Manohar Ajgaonkar	4,328	42.91%	▲16.42
BJP	Dhargalkar Balkrishna Atmaram	3,232	32.04%	New
MGP	Harmalkar Ramesh Mukund	1,934	19.18%	▼41.83
Independent	Deu Mandrekar	296	2.93%	New
JD	Rao Narayan Bhikaji	161	1.60%	New
Goa Vikas Party	Parshekar Resha Rajanikant	133	1.32%	New
Margin of victory		1,096	10.87%	▼23.64
Turnout		10,086	68.24%	▼1.59
Registered electors		14,777		▲6.45
INC gain from MGP		Swing	▼18.09	

=== Assembly Election 1994 ===
1994 Goa Legislative Assembly election : Dargalim
Party	Candidate	Votes	%	±%
MGP	Deu Mandrekar	5,915	61.00%	▼11.23
INC	Bandekar Shambhu Bhau	2,569	26.50%	▲14.14
Independent	Harijan Manohar Mahadeo	406	4.19%	New
BSP	Gaonkar Pradeep Shankar	365	3.76%	New
UGDP	Shirodkar Shamsunder Narayan	222	2.29%	New
Margin of victory		3,346	34.51%	▼25.37
Turnout		9,696	68.59%	▼2.46
Registered electors		13,882		▲10.79
MGP hold		Swing	▼11.23	

=== Assembly Election 1989 ===
1989 Goa Legislative Assembly election : Dargalim
Party	Candidate	Votes	%	±%
MGP	Deu Mandrekar	6,544	72.23%	New
INC	Bandekar Shambhu Bhau	1,119	12.35%	New
Independent	Arlekar Anil Ramchandra	808	8.92%	New
Independent	Nipanikar Balram Vishnu	156	1.72%	New
BJP	Arlekar Vishwanath Narasobha	84	0.93%	New
Independent	Halarnakar Subhash Ramnath	59	0.65%	New
Margin of victory		5,425	59.88%	
Turnout		9,060	70.08%	
Registered electors		12,530		
MGP win (new seat)				

== See also ==
- Pernem (Goa Assembly constituency)
