= Deu Mandrekar =

Indian politician

Member of Goa Legislative Assembly
- In office 1977–1984
- Preceded by: Jaisingrao Rane
- Succeeded by: Parshuram Kotkar
- Constituency: Pernem

Personal details
- Born: 18 March 1923 Mandrem, Goa, Portuguese India
- Party: Indian National Congress
- Other political affiliations: Maharashtrawadi Gomantak Party; Goa Rajiv Congress Party
- Spouse: Sadischya Gaonkar
- Education: Bachelor of Art
- Alma mater: University of Mysore
- Profession: Agriculture

Deu Gunaji Mandrekar (born 18 March 1923 – unknown) was an Indian politician. He was elected to the Goa Legislative Assembly from Pernem in the 1977, 1980 as a member of the Maharashtrawadi Gomantak Party and from Dargalim in the 1989, 1994 Goa Legislative Assembly election. He was Deputy Speaker of the Goa Legislative Assembly from January 1995 to November 1998.

In 1999, Mandrekar ran as an independent, having defected ten times by that point. In April 2012, it was noted that Mandrekar is deceased.
