= Familygram =

Personal message sent to submariners

A familygram is a personal message sent by their families to sailors of the United States Navy or the Royal Navy serving in submarines. The word is a portmanteau of "family" and "telegram".

Because submarines normally maintain radio silence to avoid detection, personal messages from the 'outside world' are severely restricted. Familygrams were originally limited to 15 words, though later as many as 50 words were permitted. Content was also severely restricted. Familygrams were not private communications. Familygrams were scanned for content before being transmitted, and scanned again before delivery to the intended recipients. There are many examples of such familygrams on the Internet, dating from the Vietnam War and earlier.

Currently the Royal Navy permits twice-weekly messages of 60 words or a weekly message of 120 to submariners serving in Trident submarines (SSBNs). The content of the messages is vetted before being sent and by the Commanding Officer of the submarine. Coded messages are not permitted, and bad news will not be passed to crew without approval from Navy personnel.

The term is also used colloquially by families wishing to communicate news to friends and extended family via printed or email newsletters.
