= Venkatesh Desai =

Indian politician and businessperson

Member of Goa Legislative Assembly
- In office 1999–2002
- Preceded by: Narahari Haldankar
- Succeeded by: Narahari Haldankar
- Constituency: Valpoi

Personal details
- Born: Venkatesh Atmaram Desai; 1948/49 (age 73–74) Sattari, Goa, Portuguese India
- Spouse: Suvarna Desai
- Education: Diploma in mechanical engineering
- Alma mater: Mulanchi Shala, Khanapur (7th grade)
- Occupation: Politician; businessperson
- Profession: Farmer

Venkatesh Atmaram Desai (born 5 July 1948/49) is an Indian politician and businessperson from Goa. He is a former member of the Goa Legislative Assembly, representing the Valpoi Assembly constituency from 1999 to 2002. He also served as a council minister in the Sardinha ministry.

== Early and personal life ==
Venkatesh Atmaram Desai was born in Advoi-Sattari, Goa. He is married to Suvarna Desai. He completed his 7th grade from Marathi Mulanchi Shala, Khanapur in 1960. Desai later completed his diploma in mechanical engineering. He is also a businessperson and farmer by profession. He currently resides at Sattari, Goa.

== Political career ==
Prior contesting the Goa Legislative elections in 1999, Desai served as a sarpanch of the Pissurlem panchayat from 1981 to 1986. He was also the sarpanch of Bhironda panchayat in 1987 and later elected as a deputy sarpanch from the same panchayat.

== Controversy ==
On 11 January 2011, prior to the 2012 Goa Legislative Assembly election, fellow MLA, Vishwajit Rane of Valpoi Assembly constituency lodged a complaint against Desai, for distribution of fake job letters amongst the youth in the constituency. However Desai denied any involvement of the same when contacted by the Election Commission of India.

== Positions held ==
- Councillor of Valpoi Municipal Council
- Treasurer of Mahadei Bachao Andolan
- Chairman of Kadamba Transport Corporation Ltd
