= Radharao Gracias =

Indian social activist (born 1954)

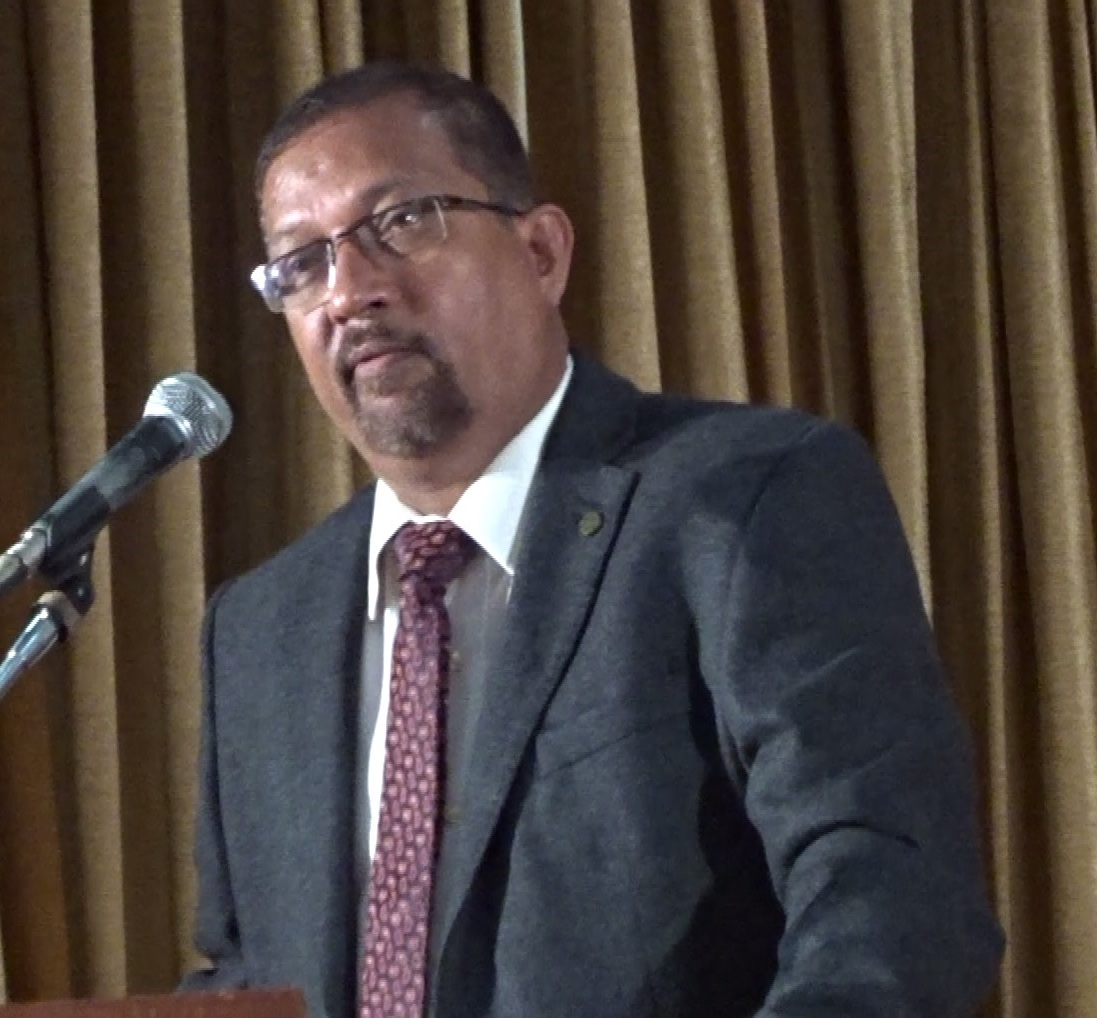
- Gracias in 2016

Member of the Goa Legislative Assembly
- In office 1989–1994
- Preceded by: Luis Proto Barbosa
- Constituency: Loutolim

Personal details
- Born: Radharao Socrates Gracias; 9 February 1954 (age 72) Goa, Portuguese India

Radharao Socrates Gracias (born 9 February 1954) is an Indian lawyer, social activist and former MLA representing Loutolim Assembly constituency in Goa as an independent candidate from 1990 to 1994.

== Political career ==
While representing Loutolim from 1990 to 1994, Gracias introduced the Goa, Daman and Diu Official Language (Amendment) Bill on 25 March 1994 to recognize Konkani language when written in the Roman script alongside when written in the Devanagari script. The bill was stiffly opposed.

Gracias has been a leader of the United Goans Democratic Party.

== Writing career ==
In 2014, Gracias wrote a book titled A Shortcut to Tipperary. It is a fictionalised memoir that revolves around life in Goa after its annexation.

Gracias is a regular contributor to the Goan newspaper O Heraldo where he often writes in support of Zionist causes and in opposition to the self-determination of Palestinians.

== Activism ==
As a senior lawyer and social activist, Gracias has been active in protesting for multiple social causes, including for the rights of shack owners at Majorda and Utorda beaches, and opposing the proposal for evening courts in 2014. He has also been a president of the South Goa Advocates Association.
