= Kashinath Shetgaonkar =

Indian politician

Member of Goa, Daman and Diu Legislative Assembly
- In office 1963–1967
- Preceded by: constituency established
- Succeeded by: Kinlekar Babal Laxman
- Constituency: Pernem
- Majority: 3,185 (49.05%)

Personal details
- Born: Morjim, Goa, Portuguese India, Portuguese Empire (now in India)
- Party: Maharashtrawadi Gomantak Party (1963)
- Occupation: Politician

Kashinath Anant Shetgaonkar (Note: Alternatively spelt as Kashinath Shetgaokar or Kashinath Anant Shet Gaokar.) was an Indian politician who served as a member of the Goa, Daman and Diu Legislative Assembly, representing the Pernem Assembly constituency from 1963 to 1967. He was a member of the Maharashtrawadi Gomantak Party.

== Personal life ==
Kashinath Anant Shetgaonkar hailed from the town of Morjim in North Goa district.

== Career ==
Shetgaonkar had a very short-lived political career. He first contested in the 1963 Goa, Daman and Diu Legislative Assembly election from the Pernem Assembly constituency on the Maharashtrawadi Gomantak Party ticket and emerged victorious by defeating the Congress party candidate by a margin of 1,273 votes. He served as a legislator of the constituency from 1963 to 1967, totaling four years.
