= Valpoi =

- city
- Location in Goa, India Valpoi (India)
- Coordinates: 15.53°N 74.13°E
- Country: India
- State: Goa
- District: North Goa

Government
  - MLA: Vishwajit Rane
  - Chairperson: Sahazin Shaikh
- Elevation: 16 m (52 ft)

Population (2001)
  - Total: 7,913

Languages
  - Official: Konkani
- Time zone: UTC+5:30 (IST)
- Postal code: 403506
- Vehicle registration: GA 04
- Website: goa.gov.in

Valpoi or Valpoy (Vallpoi, pronounced [waːɭpɔj]) is a city and a municipal council in North Goa district in the Indian state of Goa. It is the headquarters of the Sattari Taluk. The Western Ghats are to the east of the town.

== Demographics ==
As of 2011 India census, Valpoi had a population of 8532. Males constitute 51% of the population and females 49%. Valpoi has an average literacy rate of 78%, higher than the national average of 59.5%: male literacy is 83%, and female literacy is 72%. In Valpoi, 10% of the population is under 6 years of age.

The climate during winter is very cool. Konkani and Marathi are widely spoken here.

== Government and politics ==
Valpoi is part of Valpoi (Goa Assembly constituency) and North Goa (Lok Sabha constituency).

== Transport ==
The transport facility available in the town is for private and government buses only. The frequency of the buses is enough to reach any part of the Goa state with no or less problem. The nearest railway station is at Thivim. From there, you could catch a train to Mumbai or any part of the south. The bus trip from Valpoi to Thivim is around 45 mins.
