= Valpoi Assembly constituency =

Legislative Assembly constituency in Goa State, India

Coordinates: 15.53°N 74.14°E

Valpoi
- Constituency No. 19 for the Goa Legislative Assembly

Constituency details
- Country: India
- Region: Western India
- State: Goa
- District: North Goa
- Lok Sabha constituency: North Goa
- Established: 1989
- Total electors: 31,958
- Reservation: None

Member of Legislative Assembly
- 8th Goa Legislative Assembly
- Incumbent Vishwajit Pratapsingh Rane
- Party: Bharatiya Janata Party

Valpoi Assembly constituency is one of 40 Goa Legislative Assembly constituencies of the state of Goa in southern India, and one of 20 constituencies under North Goa Lok Sabha constituency.

== Members of Legislative Assembly ==
Year	Member	Party
1989	Balkrishna Prabhu	Indian National Congress
1994	Narahari Haldankar	Bharatiya Janata Party
1999	Venkatesh Desai	Indian National Congress
2002	Narahari Haldankar	Bharatiya Janata Party
2007	Vishwajit Rane	Independent politician
2012	Vishwajit Rane	Indian National Congress
2017	Vishwajit Rane	Indian National Congress
2017 By-election	Vishwajit Rane	Bharatiya Janata Party
2022	Vishwajit Rane	Bharatiya Janata Party

== Election results ==
=== 2027 Assembly election ===
2027 Goa Legislative Assembly election: Valpoi
Party	Candidate	Votes	%	±%
INC				
NDA				
NOTA	None of the above			
Majority				
Turnout				
gain from		Swing		

=== Assembly Election 2022 ===
2022 Goa Legislative Assembly election : Valpoi
Party	Candidate	Votes	%	±%
BJP	Vishwajit Rane	14,462	53.62%	▼16.57
RGP	Manoj Parab	6,377	23.64%	New
AAP	Satyavijay Naik	2,599	9.64%	New
INC	Manisha Shenvi Usgaonkar	2,101	7.79%	▼18.66
NOTA	None of the Above	411	1.52%	▼0.46
Jai Maha Bharath Party	Sudesh Madhukar Parab	354	1.31%	New
MGP	Vishvesh Prabhu	346	1.28%	New
SS	Devidas Gaonkar	183	0.68%	New
Margin of victory		8,085	29.98%	▼13.76
Turnout		26,970	84.41%	▲4.54
Registered electors		31,950		▲10.65
BJP hold		Swing	▼16.57	

=== Assembly By-election 2017 ===
2017 GoaLegislative Assembly by-election : Valpoi
Party	Candidate	Votes	%	±%
BJP	Vishwajit Rane	16,188	70.19%	▲39.33
INC	Roy Naik	6,101	26.45%	▼26.82
NOTA	None of the above	458	1.99%	▲0.56
Independent	Rohidas Gaonkar	316	1.37%	New
Margin of victory		10,087	43.74%	▲21.32
Turnout		23,063	78.29%	▼7.96
Registered electors		28,874		▲0.14
BJP gain from INC		Swing	▲16.91	

=== Assembly Election 2017 ===
2017 Goa Legislative Assembly election : Valpoi
Party	Candidate	Votes	%	±%
INC	Vishwajit Rane	13,493	53.28%	▼0.17
BJP	Satyavijay Naik	7,815	30.86%	▼9.93
MGP	Vijay Atmaram Gaonkar	3,246	12.82%	New
AAP	Ashish V. Kanekar	410	1.62%	New
NOTA	None of the Above	362	1.43%	New
Margin of victory		5,678	22.42%	▲9.76
Turnout		25,326	87.83%	▼1.17
Registered electors		28,835		▲10.50
INC hold		Swing	▼0.17	

=== Assembly Election 2012 ===
2012 Goa Legislative Assembly election : Valpoi
Party	Candidate	Votes	%	±%
INC	Vishwajit Rane	12,412	53.45%	New
BJP	Satyavijay Naik	9,473	40.79%	▲5.07
Independent	Venkatesh Desai	805	3.47%	New
Independent	Ravindra Talaulikar	255	1.10%	New
Independent	Gajendranath Ramkrishna Usgaonkar	184	0.79%	New
Margin of victory		2,939	12.66%	▼12.49
Turnout		23,223	88.64%	▲9.12
Registered electors		26,094		▲47.68
INC gain from Independent		Swing	▼7.42	

=== Assembly Election 2007 ===
2007 Goa Legislative Assembly election : Valpoi
Party	Candidate	Votes	%	±%
Independent	Vishwajit Rane	8,590	60.87%	New
BJP	Gaonkar Puti	5,041	35.72%	▼13.74
MGP	Adv. Rohidas Sada Gaonkar	371	2.63%	▼1.13
Margin of victory		3,549	25.15%	▲22.31
Turnout		14,113	79.25%	▲2.70
Registered electors		17,669		▲9.89
Independent gain from BJP		Swing		

=== Assembly Election 2002 ===
2002 Goa Legislative Assembly election : Valpoi
Party	Candidate	Votes	%	±%
BJP	Narahari Haldankar	6,137	49.46%	New
INC	Venkatesh Desai	5,785	46.62%	▲8.61
MGP	Katker Suresh Harischandra	466	3.76%	New
Margin of victory		352	2.84%	▼4.94
Turnout		12,409	77.04%	▲6.05
Registered electors		16,079		▲4.08
BJP gain from INC		Swing		

=== Assembly Election 1999 ===
1999 Goa Legislative Assembly election : Valpoi
Party	Candidate	Votes	%	±%
INC	Venkatesh Desai	4,177	38.01%	New
BJP	Narahari Haldankar	3,323	30.24%	
Independent	Balkrishna Prabhu	1,958	17.82%	New
MGP	Pednekar Devidas Krishna	1,092	9.94%	New
Goa Vikas Party	Mahalshekar Ankush Mahadev	280	2.55%	New
Independent	Khan Shaukatali Adam	158	1.44%	New
Margin of victory		854	7.77%	▼0.67
Turnout		10,988	71.12%	▼8.06
Registered electors		15,449		▲7.85
INC gain from BJP		Swing	▼4.77	

=== Assembly Election 1994 ===
1994 Goa Legislative Assembly election : Valpoi
Party	Candidate	Votes	%	±%
BJP	Narahari Haldankar	4,853	42.78%	New
INC	Balkrishna Prabhu	3,895	34.34%	
JD	Rane Ranjit Jaisingrao	961	8.47%	New
Independent	Teli Anant Krishna	911	8.03%	New
CPI	Vincy Gonsalves	288	2.54%	New
BSP	Khan Abdul Razak	91	0.80%	New
Margin of victory		958	8.45%	▼2.61
Turnout		11,343	77.25%	▲0.51
Registered electors		14,324		▲10.24
BJP gain from INC		Swing	▼10.39	

=== Assembly Election 1989 ===
1989 Goa Legislative Assembly election : Valpoi
Party	Candidate	Votes	%	±%
INC	Balkrishna Prabhu	5,436	53.17%	New
MGP	Desai Baburao Harijirao	4,306	42.12%	New
Gomantak Bahujan Samaj Parishad	Khan Abdul Razak	118	1.15%	New
Margin of victory		1,130	11.05%	
Turnout		10,223	76.19%	
Registered electors		12,993		
INC win (new seat)				

== See also ==
- List of constituencies of the Goa Legislative Assembly
- North Goa district
