= Loutolim Assembly constituency =

Constituency of the Goa legislative assembly in India

Loutolim
- Former constituency for the Goa Legislative Assembly

Constituency details
- Country: India
- Region: Western India
- State: Goa
- Established: 1989
- Abolished: 2012
- Total electors: 22,626

Loutolim Assembly constituency was an assembly constituency in the India state of Goa.

== Members of the Legislative Assembly ==
Election	Member	Party
1989	Barbosa Luis Proto Aleixo	Indian National Congress
1994	Aleixo Sequeira	Indian National Congress
1999	Aleixo Sequeira	Indian National Congress
2002	Aleixo Sequeira	Indian National Congress
2007	Aleixo Sequeira	Indian National Congress

== Election results ==
=== Assembly Election 2007 ===
2007 Goa Legislative Assembly election : Loutolim
Party	Candidate	Votes	%	±%
INC	Aleixo Sequeira	6,435	43.28%	▼19.59
Save Goa Front	Fernandes Piedade Remegio (Remy)	4,894	32.91%	New
Independent	Dourado Pausilipo Eviaco Estivao	3,534	23.77%	New
Margin of victory		1,541	10.36%	▼23.32
Turnout		14,869	65.69%	▼1.04
Registered electors		22,626		▲7.03
INC hold		Swing	▼19.59	

=== Assembly Election 2002 ===
2002 Goa Legislative Assembly election : Loutolim
Party	Candidate	Votes	%	±%
INC	Aleixo Sequeira	8,873	62.87%	New
UGDP	Gracias Radharao Socrates	4,119	29.19%	New
NCP	Colaco Caetano Inacio	561	3.98%	New
BJP	Jose Pinheiro	262	1.86%	New
Independent	Vaz Joaquim	176	1.25%	New
Goa Su-Raj Party	John Philip Pereira	119	0.84%	New
Margin of victory		4,754	33.69%	
Turnout		14,113	66.75%	▲66.76
Registered electors		21,140		▲7.36
INC hold		Swing		

=== Assembly Election 1999 ===
1999 Goa Legislative Assembly election : Loutolim
Party	Candidate	Votes	%	±%
INC	Aleixo Sequeira	Unopposed		
Registered electors		19,690		▲12.62
INC hold		Swing		

=== Assembly Election 1994 ===
1994 Goa Legislative Assembly election : Loutolim
Party	Candidate	Votes	%	±%
INC	Aleixo Sequeira	6,846	53.33%	▲16.71
UGDP	Gracias Radharao Socrates	5,177	40.33%	New
Independent	Carvalho Manuel Bernardo	262	2.04%	New
MGP	Parkar Ajit	110	0.86%	New
BSP	Baptista Xavier	90	0.70%	New
Margin of victory		1,669	13.00%	▲11.97
Turnout		12,836	72.04%	▲4.27
Registered electors		17,484		▲8.70
INC hold		Swing	▲16.71	

=== Assembly Election 1989 ===
1989 Goa Legislative Assembly election : Loutolim
Party	Candidate	Votes	%	±%
INC	Barbosa Luis Proto Aleixo	4,073	36.62%	New
Independent	Fernandes Sedy Antonio	3,958	35.59%	New
Gomantak Lok Pox	Disa Celso	2,661	23.93%	New
Independent	Barreto Antonio Caitano	131	1.18%	New
Independent	Fernandes Joaquim B. P. Antonio	67	0.60%	New
Margin of victory		115	1.03%	
Turnout		11,122	67.70%	
Registered electors		16,085		
INC win (new seat)				
