= Aleixo Sequeira =

Indian politician and businessman (born 1957)

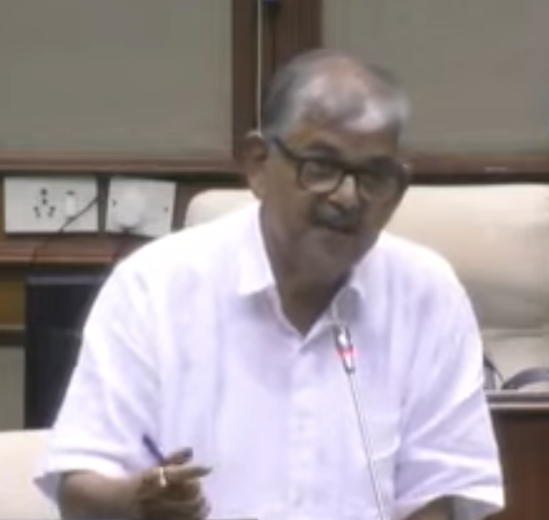
- Sequeira in 2024

Minister of Environment, Captain of Ports, Law and Judiciary and Legislative Affairs, Government of Goa
- In office 19 November 2023 – 20 August 2025
- Preceded by: Nilesh Cabral
- Succeeded by: Digambar Kamat
- Chief Minister: Pramod Sawant

Member of Goa Legislative Assembly
- Incumbent
- Assumed office 10 March 2022
- Preceded by: Wilfred D'sa
- Constituency: Nuvem

Personal details
- Born: Aleixo A. Sequeira; 10 April 1957 (age 69) Mombasa, Kenya Colony (now Kenya)
- Party: Bhartiya Janta Party (2022–present)
- Other political affiliations: Indian National Congress (till September 2022)
- Education: Bombay University (B.Com)
- Occupation: Politician; businessman
- Website: twitter.com/AleixoASequeira

Aleixo A. Sequeira (born 10 April 1957) is an Indian politician and businessman who serves as the member of the Goa Legislative Assembly, representing the Nuvem Assembly constituency since 2022. He successfully contested on the Indian National Congress ticket in the 2022 Goa Legislative Assembly election by defeating Revolutionary Goans Party candidate Arvind D'Costa by a margin of 4,397 votes. He defected to the Bharatiya Janata Party in 2022.

== Early life and education ==
Aleixo A. Sequeira was born on 10 April 1957 to Eusebio Antonio de Piedade Sequeira and Ermelinda Figueiredo e Sequeira (née Figueiredo) in Mombasa, Kenya Colony (now Kenya). He completed his graduation in Bachelor of Commerce from Bombay University in 1979. He is married to a retired service teacher and currently resides at Nuvem, Goa.

== Career ==
He was previously an MLA from 2007 to 2012, representing the Indian National Congress from the Loutolim Assembly constituency.
