= Narahari Haldankar =

Indian politician (born 1952)

Deputy Speakers of the Goa Legislative Assembly
- In office 2002–2007
- Preceded by: Ulhas Asnodkar
- Constituency: Valpoi

Personal details
- Born: Narahari Haldankar; 9 May 1950 (age 76) Valpoi, Goa
- Party: Bharatiya Janata Party
- Parent: Tukaram Haldankar (father)
- Education: B.A. (Economics)
- Alma mater: Bombay University

Narahari Haldankar is an Indian politician. He was elected to the Goa Legislative Assembly from Valpoi in the 1994 and 2002 Goa Legislative Assembly election as a member of the Bharatiya Janata Party. He was Deputy Speaker of the Goa Legislative Assembly from June 2002 to February 2005.
