= Business correspondence =

Exchange of business information

Business correspondence means the exchange of information in a written format for the process of business activities. Business correspondence can take place between organizations, within organizations or between the customers and the organization. The correspondence refers to the written communication between persons. Hence oral communication or face to face communication is not a business correspondence.

== Need for written communication ==
1. Maintaining a proper relationship.
2. Serves as evidence or as historical record of a business activities.
3. Create and maintain goodwill.
4. Inexpensive and convenient.
5. Formal communication.
6. Independent of interpersonal skills.

== Types of correspondence ==
=== Business letters ===
Business letters are the most formal method of communication following specific formats. They are addressed to a particular person or organization. A good business letter follows the seven C's of communication. The different types of business letters used based on their context are as follows,

1. Letters of inquiry
2. Letters of claim/complaints
3. Letters of application
4. Letters of approval/dismissal
5. Letters of recommendations
6. Letters of promise.

Official letters can be handwritten or printed. Modernisation has led to the usage of new means of business correspondence such as E-mail and Fax.

=== Email ===
Email is the latest formal method of business communication. It is the most widely used method of written communication usually done in a conversational style. It is used when there is a need to communicate to large audience in an organization.

=== Memorandum ===
Memorandum is a document used for internal communication within an organization. Memorandums may be drafted by management and addressed to other employees, and it is sent with the money draft. Memos are sent to several people in a team when important business matters need to be updated to them or to a single person to have a written record of the informations.
