= Sattari taluka =

Sattari Konkani: Sattari
- Taluka
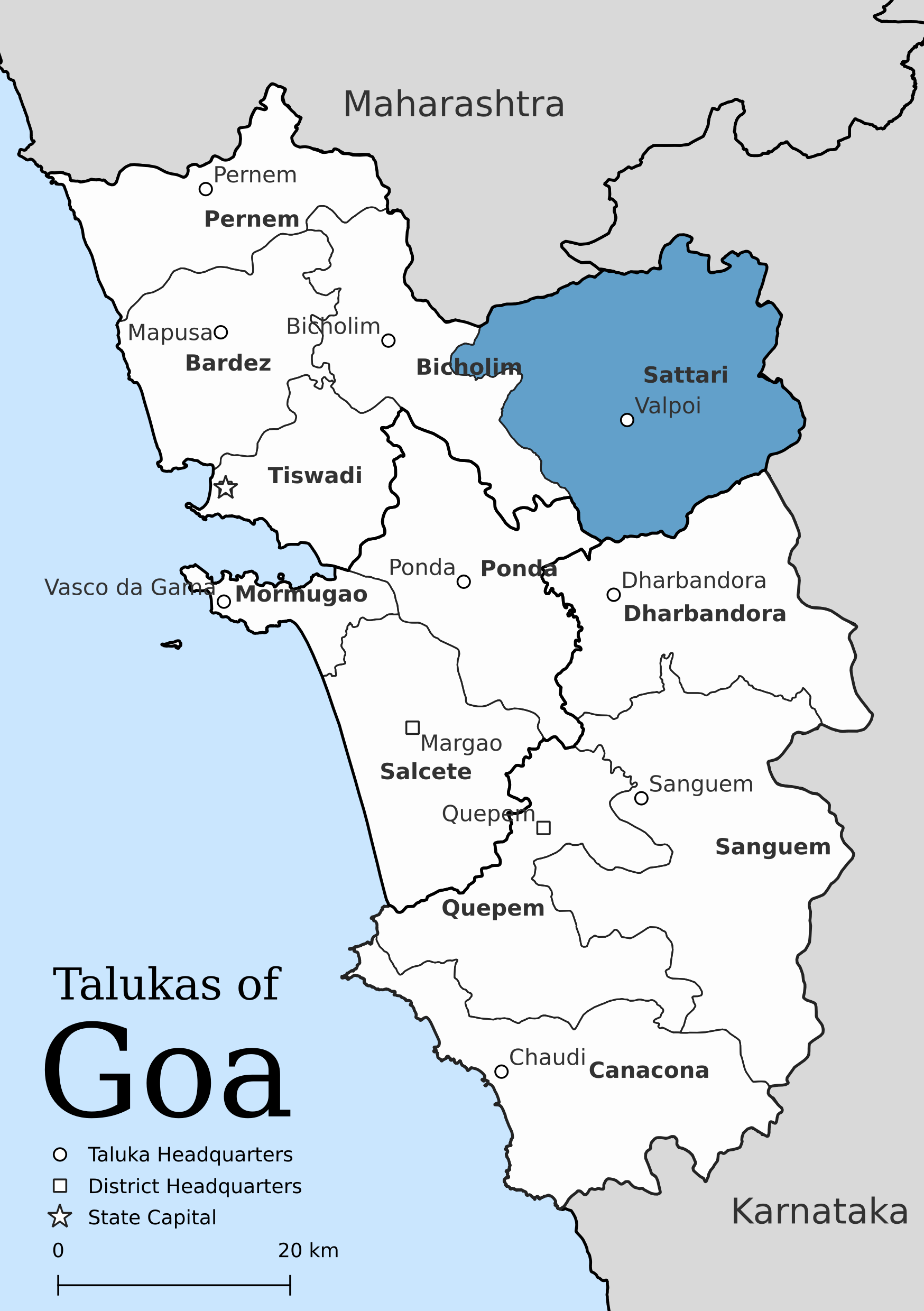
- Country: India
- State: Goa
- District: North Goa district
- Headquarters: Valpoi

Area
  - Total: 495.13 km^{2} (191.17 sq mi)
- Elevation: 16 m (52 ft)

Population (2011)
  - Total: 63,817
  - Density: 128.89/km^{2} (333.82/sq mi)

Languages
  - Official: Konkani, English
- Time zone: UTC+5:30 (IST)
- PIN: 4031XX, 4035XX
- ISO 3166 code: ISO 3166-2:IN
- Vehicle registration: GA-04

Sattari (Konkani: Sot'tori; IPA: [sɔt̪t̪ɔriː]) is a taluka of North Goa district in the state of Goa, India. There are 77 villages and 2 towns in Sattari taluka. The headquarters of Sattari taluka is Valpoi municipal council. It lies in the north-eastern region of Goa where it is known for its greenery and dense forest. Part of the Western Ghats forms the eastern part of the Sattari taluka. The Mandovi River (popularly known as Mhadei in Sattari taluka) is considered to be the lifeline of Sattari. It has a geographical area of 490 km^{2}; the Mhadei Wildlife Sanctuary covers 208 km^{2} of this area.

== Demographics ==
As per the Census India 2011, Sattari taluka has a population of 63,817. The sex-ratio of Sattari taluka is around 959 compared to 973 which is the state average of Goa. The literacy rate of Sattari taluka is 76.67% out of which 82.16% males are literate and 70.95% females are literate. The total area of Sattari is 495.13 km^{2} with population density of 129 per km^{2}. Majority of the population lives in urban areas.

=== Languages ===
Konkani is the most spoken language in Sattari taluka. Marathi is also spoken by a significant minority.

At the time of 2011 Census of India, 61.83% of the population of Sattari taluka spoke Konkani, 24.15% Marathi, 5.16% Urdu, 3.63% Hindi and 2.34% Kannada as their first language.

Languages of Sattari Taluka (2011)
1. Konkani (61.8%)
2. Marathi (24.1%)
3. Urdu (5.16%)
4. Hindi (3.63%)
5. Kannada (2.34%)
6. Others (2.89%)

=== Religion ===
Religion in Sattari Taluka (2011)
Religion	Percent
Hinduism	90.80%
Islam	7.74%
Christianity	1.26%
Others	0.20%

Hinduism is followed by the vast majority of population of Sattari taluka. Muslims and Christians are among the minorities. At the time of the 2011 Census of India, 90.80% of the population of the taluka followed Hinduism, 7.74% Islam, 1.26% Christianity and 0.20% of the population followed other religions or did not state religion.

== Rural Goa ==
Sattari is part of interior rural Goa. Some of the recent news that emerged from there includes cyclonic winds hitting part of the region in mid-October 2018, farmers protesting land ownership issues, protests over electricity issues and potholes in the roads, among others.

== Seventy villages ==
Sattari is believed to comprise 70 villages, as suggested by its name, which is believed to be a derivative from the Konkani word 'seventy'. Among these are:

- Brahmacarmali, which is directly related to Karmali or Carambolim, connected with the migration of the deity of Lord Brahma and the only home in Goa of a Brahmadeva temple in Goa. Brahma temples are considered rare.
- Dhave/धावे is a village which was connected by the first Kadamba state-run bus service to Panjim, GDX-001, when it was started in 1980.
- Hedoda/Nadoda. Like some other twin villages in Sattari, this too is a set of twin villages.
- Ambede/Bhombede. This is second pair of twin villages. Ambede is a village of veteran litterateur, researcher and scholar Pandit MahadevShastri Joshi who wrote an entire Indian cultural encyclopaedia on his own. He is known to have lost a huge amount of his written literature in Panshet dam tragedy in Pune in the 1960s.
- Thane is a village which claims the legacy of the then mighty revenue officers holding the office of the Desai in the Portuguese and pre-Portuguese eras.
- Valpoi is the capital of this sub-district or taluka. It is believed that the name Valpoi derived from the phrase vhal poi/ व्हाळ पळय/ meaning, see the rivulet. Valpoi is the main town of Sattari and hub of merchants and the Muslim community settled there.
- Dabose It is a small hamlet of Veluz village falling under Valpoi Municipality area covering ward number 1 with voters population slightly crossing 800. It is situated on the bank of Mhadei river. Villages surrounding dabos are Massordem, Kudcem & Velguem. Dabos has PWD water purification plant which caters the drinking water needs of Sattari Taluka. The village has highly educated youth which are working around the corners of Goa. The son of Farmer Shri Narayan Dhuri is Dr. Sunder Dhuri who is one of them with highest qualification of PhD and post-doctoral research. The village has a temple of godes Mahalaxmi and every Friday village gather and perform weekly bhaja and aarties. Most of people are engaged in agriculture and enjoy their daily agricultural products.
- Masorde probably has its name derived from the domestic animal, mhais/म्हैस/buffalo.
- Redeghati is not a village but a famous or infamous location for paranormal activities that are believed to be taking place after sunset. Its name derived from presence of bison in large numbers.
- Honda is not to be confused with the Japanese company of the same name. Like Ponda/फोंडा in Goa, which is probably derived from फोंड/pit, similarly Honda means Hond/होंड/pit.
- Pissurlem/पिसुर्ले is one of the prominent mining villages in Goa, Pissurlem was home of famous Maratha warrior Deepajirao Rane. The second family of the Ranes traces its Goa roots here.
- Kerim/Keri/केरी. A village which shares its name with two other Keri villages in Goa, this village has been a spectator to the development of Rane family in the world of politics from Keri to Sanquelim. Satroji Rane Sardesai was the founder of Rane family in Goa. The village is also famous for the temple of the guardian god, Shree Ajoba. The Rane's first family belongs here.
- Poriem/Parye/पर्ये* Another village from Sattari.
- Advoi. Home of Dada Rane, one of the Ranes who revolted against the Portuguese. The Rane's third family belongs to this place.
- Kopardem: Famous for its Divjotsav held annually at Bramhani Mahamaya Devasthan, Temple's teerth is believed to cure Skin Diseases and Snake bites.
- Gawane. A village settled closed to Bondla Wildlife Sanctuary. Its name is derived from the animal Gawa/ गवा/ Bison. Gawane is a village densely covered with reserved forest.
- Shelop and Shelop Khurd. These twin villages are a part and neighbours to dense reserved forest. The name Shelop might have derived from Sanskrit word शिला.
- Morley and Morlem colony. Morlem/ मोर्ले is a village neighbouring Parye and Kerim whereas Morlem colony is a rehabilitated area of Anjunem Dam victims including villagers of Anjunem/ अंजुणे, Ponsuli/पणसुले, Gullem/गुळ्ळे and Kelavade/केळावडे.
- Vagheri.Vagheri/ वाघेरी is a third highest peak in the sub -district of Satari in North Goa in the state of Goa, trailed by Sosogad/Sonsogor/ सोसोगड which stands first and Kantalanchi Molli/ कांतलांची मळी being second.
- Bhirondem has been called "the 20th century village of settlers". It has around 500 voters, including 333 voters, and is one of the smallest villages of Goa. Isidore Domnick Mendis writes that the village, according to its chroniclers, had hardly any human residents and the Portuguese government settled many Goans in the village. Most settlers came from other parts of Goa such as "Pernem, Arpora, Mapusa, Merces, Loutolim, Poriem, Usgao and Khandepar."

Bhirondem is known for the academic branch of prominent institute in Goa, "Pilar Fathers"; a well developed and maintained farm is a tourist attraction in this village.
