= 6th Goa Assembly =

- Goa Legislative Assembly

Type
- Type: Unicameral
- Term limits: 5 years

History
- Founded: 2012
- Disbanded: 2017
- Preceded by: 5th Goa Assembly
- Succeeded by: 7th Goa Assembly

Leadership
- Speaker: Anant Shet, BJP
- Deputy Speaker: Vishnu Wagh, BJP since 2012
- Leader of the House: Laxmikant Parsekar, BJP since 2014
- Leader Of Opposition: Pratapsingh Rane, INC since March, 2012

Structure
- Seats: 40
- Political groups: BJP (21) Congress (7); MGP (3); GVP (1); Goa Su-Raj Party (1); Independents (5) Vacant (2)

Elections
- Voting system: First-past-the-post
- Last election: 3 March 2012
- Next election: 4 February 2017

Website
- Goa Assembly

The Sixth Goa Assembly (term : 2012-2017) was the unicameral legislature of the state of Goa in western India. It consists of 40 members. In charge of the budget, the Assembly appropriates money for social programs, agricultural development, infrastructure development, etc. It is also responsible for proposing and levying taxes.

The Assembly met in the Goa State Legislative Assembly Complex in Porvorim, Bardez.

== Leaders ==
Position	Name
Governor	Mridula Sinha
Chief Minister	Laxmikant Parsekar
Deputy Chief Minister	Francis Dsouza
Speaker	Anant Shet
Deputy Speaker	Vishnu Wagh

== Goa Assembly Name ==
Mandrem	Ponda	Pernem	Siroda	Panaji	Navelim
Bicholim	Marcaim	Tivim	Mormugao	Margao	St. Andre
Mapusa	Vasco Da Gama	Siolim	Dabolim	Taleigao	Cuncolim
Saligao	Cortalim	Calangute	Nuvem	Benaulim	Cumbarjua
Porvorim	Curtorim	Aldona	Fatorda	Santa Cruz	Velim
Maem	Quepem	Sanquelim	Curchorem	Poriem	Sanvordem
Valpoi	Sanguem	Priol	Canacona		

== Composition ==
Composition of the Sixth Goa Legislative Assembly
Party	Seats
Bhartiya Janata Party	21
Maharashtrawadi Gomantak	3
Indian National Congress	9
Goa Vikas Party	2
Independents	5
Total	40

== Members ==
The following is the list of MLAs in the Sixth Goa Legislative Assembly after the 2012 election.

List of MLAs by constituency
Assembly Constituency		Member	
#	Name	Name	Party
1	Mandrem	Laxmikant Parsekar	Bharatiya Janata Party
2	Pernem	Rajendra Arlekar	Bharatiya Janata Party
3	Bicholim	Naresh Sawal	Independent
4	Tivim	Kiran Kandolkar	Bharatiya Janata Party
5	Mapusa	Francis D'Souza	Bharatiya Janata Party
6	Siolim	Dayanand Mandrekar	Bharatiya Janata Party
7	Saligao	Dilip Parulekar	Bharatiya Janata Party
8	Calangute	Michael Lobo	Bharatiya Janata Party
9	Porvorim	Rohan Khaunte	Independent
10	Aldona	Glenn Ticlo	Bharatiya Janata Party
11	Panaji	Manohar Parrikar	Bharatiya Janata Party
12	Taleigao	Jennifer Monserrate	Indian National Congress
13	Santa Cruz	Atanasio Monserrate	Indian National Congress
14	St. Andre	Vishnu Wagh	Bharatiya Janata Party
15	Cumbarjua	Pandurang Madkaikar	Indian National Congress
16	Maem	Anant Shet	Bharatiya Janata Party
17	Sanquelim	Pramod Sawant	Bharatiya Janata Party
18	Poriem	Pratapsingh Rane	Indian National Congress
19	Valpoi	Vishwajit Pratapsingh Rane	Indian National Congress
20	Priol	Deepak Dhavalikar	Maharashtrawadi Gomantak Party
21	Ponda	Lavoo Mamledar	Maharashtrawadi Gomantak Party
22	Siroda	Mahadev Naik	Bharatiya Janata Party
23	Marcaim	Sudin Dhavalikar	Maharashtrawadi Gomantak Party
24	Mormugao	Milind Naik	Bharatiya Janata Party
25	Vasco da Gama	Carlos Almeida	Bharatiya Janata Party
26	Dabolim	Mauvin Godinho	Indian National Congress
27	Cortalim	Matanhy Saldanha (dead)	Bharatiya Janata Party
27	Cortalim	Alina Saldanha	Bharatiya Janata Party
28	Nuvem	Francisco Pacheco	Goa Vikas Party
29	Curtorim	Aleixo Lourenco	Indian National Congress
30	Fatorda	Vijai Sardesai	Independent
31	Margao	Digambar Kamat	Indian National Congress
32	Benaulim	Caetano Silva	Goa Vikas Party
33	Navelim	Avertano Furtado	Independent
34	Cuncolim	Subhash Rajan Naik	Bharatiya Janata Party
35	Velim	Benjamin Silva	Independent
36	Quepem	Chandrakant Kavlekar	Indian National Congress
37	Curchorem	Nilesh Cabral	Bharatiya Janata Party
38	Sanvordem	Ganesh Gaonkar	Bharatiya Janata Party
39	Sanguem	Subhash Phal Desai	Bharatiya Janata Party
40	Canacona	Ramesh Tawadkar	Bharatiya Janata Party

=== By-election ===
After the death of incumbent MLA of Cortalim Matanhy Saldanha, his wife Alina Saldanha was elected unopposed from Cortalim on 25 May. Other candidates withdrew from the contest. She was given her husband's ministerial portfolio as forest minister.
