= 2017 Goa Legislative Assembly election =

Election in Indian state

- 4 February 2017

All 40 seats in Goa Legislative Assembly 21 seats needed for a majority
- Turnout: 82.56% (▼0.38%)
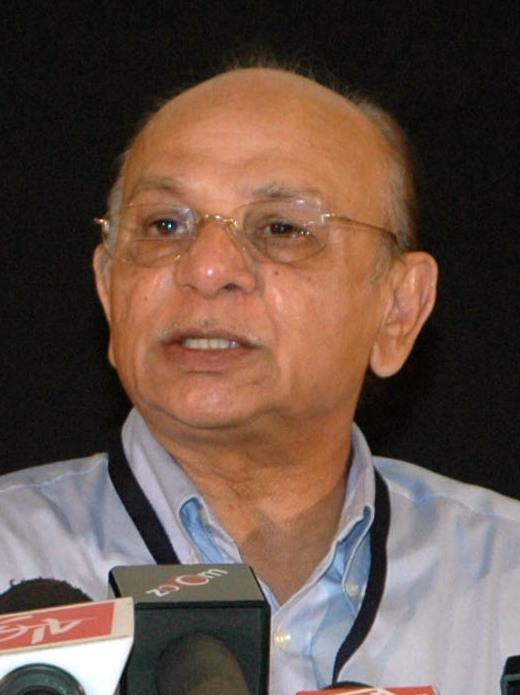

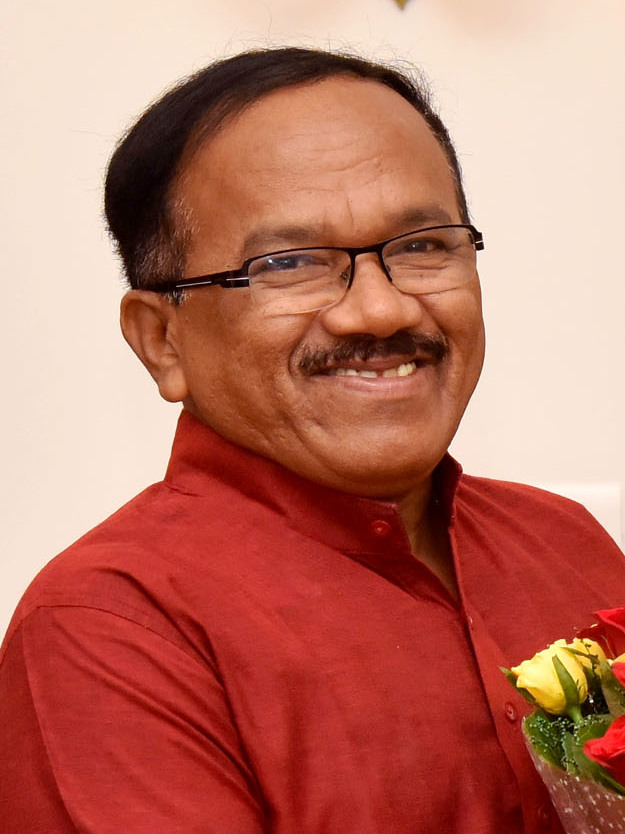

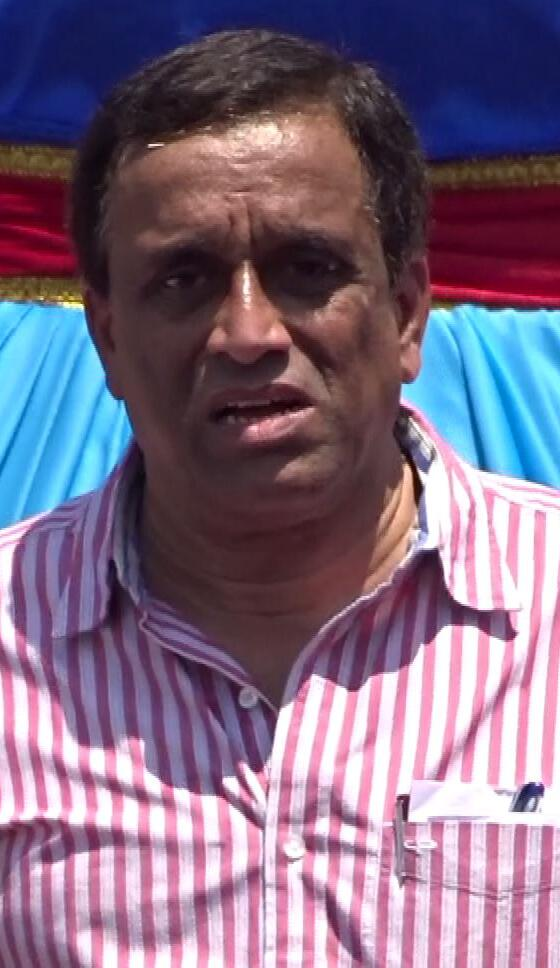

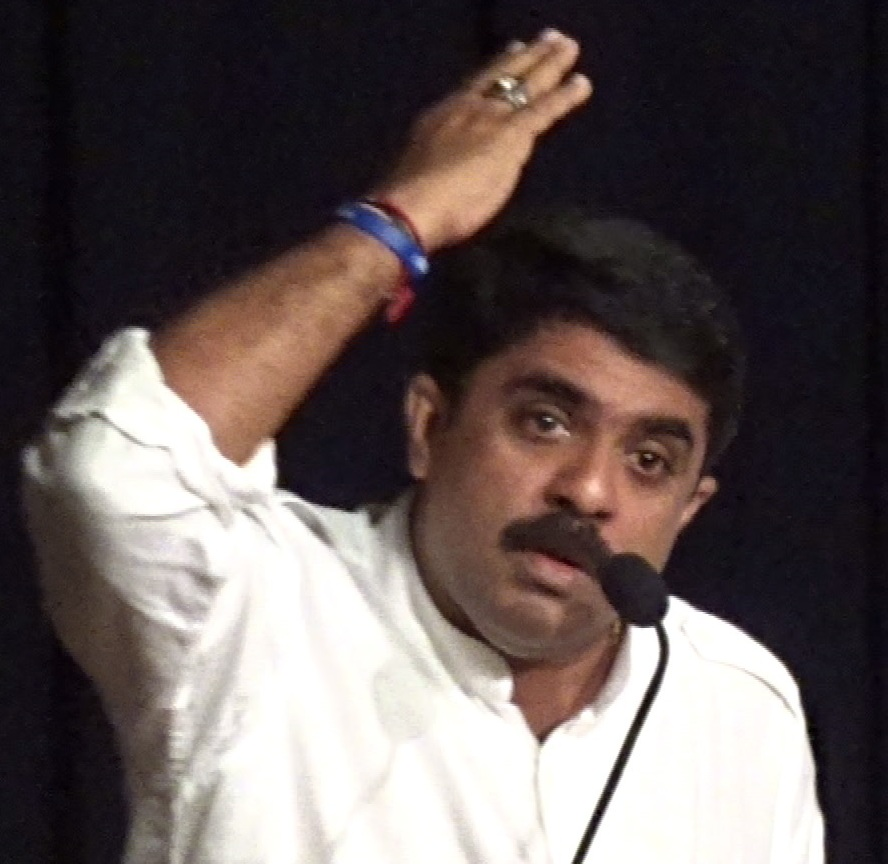
	First party	Second party
Leader	Pratapsingh Rane	Laxmikant Parsekar
Party	INC	BJP
Alliance	UPA	NDA
Leader's seat	Poriem (won)	Mandrem (lost)
Last election	9	21
Seats won	17	13
Seat change	▲8	▼8
Popular vote	259,758	297,588
Percentage	28.4%	32.5%
Swing	▼2.3%	▼2.1%
	Third party	Fourth party
Leader	Sudin Dhavalikar	Vijai Sardesai
Party	MGP	GFP
Alliance	-	-
Leader's seat	Marcaim (won)	Fatorda (won)
Last election	3	Did not exist
Seats won	3	3
Seat change	Steady	▲3
Popular vote	103,290	31,900
Percentage	11.3%	3.5%
Swing	▲4.6%	▲3.5%

- Structure of the Goa Legislative Assembly after the election
Chief Minister before election
Laxmikant Parsekar
BJP
Elected Chief Minister
Manohar Parrikar
BJP

The 2017 Goa Legislative Assembly election was held on 4 February 2017 to elect the 40 members of the Seventh Goa Legislative Assembly, as the term of Sixth Legislative Assembly ended on 18 March 2017. VVPAT-fitted EVMs was used in entire Goa state in the 2017 elections, which was the first time that an entire state in India saw the implementation of VVPAT.

== Background ==
The term of the Legislative Assembly ended on March 18, 2017. The last election had resulted in a 21-seat majority to the Bharatiya Janata Party led by Manohar Parrikar. Parrikar was elected Chief Minister. In 2014, he had to resign due to being nominated as Minister of Defence. Laxmikant Parsekar took oath as Chief Minister as Parrikar's successor.

== Opinion polls ==
Polling firm	Date	BJP	INC	AAP	Others
HuffPost-CVoter	Feb 2017	15	14	2	8
The Week - Hansa	Jan 2017	17-19 (18)	11-13 (12)	2-4 (3)	3-5 (4)
Axis My India - India Today	Jan 2017	20-24 (22)	13-15 (14)	2-4 (3)	1-2 (1)
Axis My India - India Today	Oct 2016	17-21 (19)	13-16 (15)	1-3 (2)	3-5 (4)
Kautilya	Aug 2016	11	7	14	8
VDP Associates	July 2016	22	6	9	3
Election results	March 2017	13	17	0	10

== Turnout ==
District	Electors	Polled	Turnout %
North Goa	540,785	458,074	84.71%
South Goa	570,907	459,758	80.53%

== Results ==
← Summary of the 4 February 2017 Goa Legislative Assembly election results
Parties and coalitions	Popular vote			Seats	
Parties and coalitions	Votes	%	± %	Won	+/−
Bharatiya Janata Party (BJP)	2,97,588	32.5	▼2.2	13	▼8
Indian National Congress (INC)	2,59,758	28.4	▼2.4	17	▲8
Maharashtrawadi Gomantak Party (MGP)	1,03,290	11.3	▲4.6	3	Steady
Independents (IND)	1,01,922	11.1	▼5.5	3	▼2
Aam Aadmi Party (AAP)	57,420	6.3	▲6.3	0	Steady
Goa Forward Party (GFP)	31,900	3.5	▲3.5	3	▲3
Nationalist Congress Party (NCP)	20,916	2.3	▼1.8	1	▲1
Goa Suraksha Manch (GSM)	10,745	1.2	▲1.2	0	Steady
United Goans Party (UGP)	8,563	0.9	▲0.9	0	Steady
Goa Vikas Party (GVP)	5,379	0.6	▼2.9	0	▼2
Others	7,816	0.9	▼2.9	0	Steady
None of the Above (NOTA)	10,919	1.2	▲1.2	—N/a	
Total	9,16,216	100.00		40	±0
Valid votes	9,16,216	99.85			
Invalid votes	1,416	0.15			
Votes cast / turnout	9,17,832	82.56			
Abstentions	1,93,860	17.44			
Registered voters	11,11,692				

== Results by constituency ==
The following is the list of winning MLAs in the election.

Constituency		Winner				Runner-up				Margin	
Constituency		Candidate	Party	Votes	%	Candidate	Party	Votes	%	Votes	%
1	Mandrem	Dayanand Sopte	INC	16,490	59.85	Laxmikant Parsekar	BJP	9,371	34.01	7,119	25.84
2	Pernem (SC)	Manohar Ajgaonkar	MGP	15,745	57.76	Rajendra Arlekar	BJP	9,715	35.64	6,030	22.12
3	Bicholim	Rajesh Patnekar	BJP	10,654	46.15	Naresh Sawal	MGP	9,988	43.27	666	2.88
4	Tivim	Nilkanth Halarnkar	INC	11,099	49.59	Kiran Kandolkar	BJP	10,304	46.04	795	3.55
5	Mapusa	Francis D'Souza	BJP	10,957	49.01	Vinod Fadke	MGP	4,129	18.47	6,828	30.54
6	Siolim	Vinoda Paliencar	GFP	10,189	43.76	Dayanand Mandrekar	BJP	8,748	37.57	1,441	6.19
7	Saligao	Jayesh Salgaonkar	GFP	9,735	46.67	Dilip Parulekar	BJP	7,598	36.43	2,137	10.24
8	Calangute	Michael Lobo	BJP	11,136	55.93	Joseph Robert Sequeira	INC	7,311	36.72	3,825	19.21
9	Porvorim	Rohan Khaunte	IND	11,174	57.36	Guruprasad R. Pawaskar	BJP	6,961	35.73	4,213	21.63
10	Aldona	Glenn Ticlo	BJP	9,405	43.93	Amarnath Panjikar	INC	4,949	23.12	4,456	20.81
11	Panaji	Sidharth Kuncalienker	BJP	7,924	46.17	Atanasio Monserrate	UGP	6,855	39.94	1,069	6.23
12	Taleigao	Jennifer Monserrate	INC	11,534	51.71	Dattaprasad Naik	BJP	8,679	38.91	2,855	12.80
13	St. Cruz	Antonio Fernandes	INC	6,202	28.30	Hemant Dinanath Golatkar	BJP	5,560	25.37	642	2.93
14	St. Andre	Francisco Silveira	INC	8,087	49.30	Ramrao Surya Naik Wagh	BJP	3,017	18.39	5,070	30.91
15	Cumbarjua	Pandurang Madkaikar	BJP	12,395	61.34	Xavier Fialho	INC	3,961	19.60	8,434	41.74
16	Maem	Pravin Zantye	BJP	12,430	52.38	Santosh Kumar Sawant	INC	7,456	31.42	4,974	20.96
17	Sanquelim	Pramod Sawant	BJP	10,058	43.04	Dharmesh Saglani	INC	7,927	33.92	2,131	9.12
18	Poriem	Pratapsingh Rane	INC	14,977	55.38	Vishwajit Krishnarao Rane	BJP	10,911	40.35	4,066	15.03
19	Valpoi	Vishwajit Pratapsingh Rane	INC	13,493	54.05	Satyavijay Subrai Naik	BJP	7,815	31.31	5,678	22.74
20	Priol	Govind Gaude	IND	15,149	57.17	Deepak Dhavalikar	MGP	10,463	39.49	4,686	17.68
21	Ponda	Ravi Naik	INC	9,502	38.25	Sunil Desai	BJP	6,492	26.13	3,010	12.12
22	Siroda	Subhash Shirodkar	INC	11,156	45.67	Mahadev Naik	BJP	6,286	25.73	4,870	19.94
23	Marcaim	Sudin Dhavalikar	MGP	17,093	74.38	Pradeep Pundalik Shet	BJP	3,413	14.85	13,680	59.53
24	Mormugao	Milind Naik	BJP	8,466	49.25	Sankalp Amonkar	INC	8,326	48.44	140	0.81
25	Vasco-da-Gama	Carlos Almeida	BJP	8,765	33.93	Krishna V. Salkar	IND	7,414	28.70	1,351	5.23
26	Dabolim	Mauvin Godinho	BJP	7,234	41.80	Premanand Nanoskar	MGP	4,740	27.39	2,494	14.41
27	Cortalim	Alina Saldanha	BJP	5,666	24.34	Antonio Vas	IND	5,148	22.12	518	2.22
28	Nuvem	Wilfred D'sa	INC	9,967	47.00	Francisco Pacheco	GSRP	4,307	20.31	5,660	26.69
29	Curtorim	Aleixo Lourenco	INC	12,841	60.99	Arthur D’Silva	BJP	5,144	24.43	7,697	36.56
30	Fatorda	Vijai Sardesai	GFP	10,516	46.09	Damu G. Naik	BJP	9,182	40.24	1,334	5.85
31	Margao	Digambar Kamat	INC	12,105	54.82	Sharmad Raiturkar	BJP	7,929	35.91	4,176	18.91
32	Benaulim	Churchill Alemao	NCP	9,373	44.37	Royla Clarina Fernandes	AAP	4,182	19.79	5,191	24.58
33	Navelim	Luizinho Faleiro	INC	8,183	38.78	Avertano Furtado	IND	5,705	27.04	2,478	11.74
34	Cuncolim	Clafasio Dias	INC	6,415	28.91	Joaquim Alemao	IND	6,382	28.76	33	0.15
35	Velim	Filipe Nery Rodrigues	INC	10,417	44.77	Benjamin Silva	IND	5,164	22.19	5,253	22.58
36	Quepem	Chandrakant Kavlekar	INC	13,525	51.42	Prakash Velip	BJP	10,933	41.56	2,592	9.86
37	Curchorem	Nilesh Cabral	BJP	12,830	60.01	Shyam Satardekar	GSM	3,742	17.50	9,088	42.51
38	Sanvordem	Deepak Pauskar	MGP	14,575	58.13	Ganesh Gaonkar	BJP	9,354	37.31	5,221	20.82
39	Sanguem	Prasad Gaonkar	IND	7,636	33.98	Subhash Phal Desai	BJP	6,699	29.81	937	4.17
40	Canacona	Isidore Fernandes	INC	10,853	38.50	Vijay Pai Khot	BJP	8,745	31.02	2,108	7.48

== Government formation ==
The election results led to a hung in the assembly, with the Indian National Congress emerging as the single largest party in the state assembly with 17 seats, followed by the Bharatiya Janata Party with 13 seats. The Indian National Congress, being emerged as the single largest party in the state, planned to form the government. However, their government formation was delayed. Very quickly, the second largest emerging party Bharatiya Janata Party claimed the support of at least 8 non- BJP MLAs, which ultimately led to its alliance, National Democratic Alliance get a coalition- majority. Manohar Parikkar was sworn in as the Chief Minister of Goa.

== By-elections held ==
Constituency			Winner				Runner Up				Margin
No.	Name	Date	Candidate	Party	Votes	%	Candidate	Party	Votes	%	Margin
11	Panaji	11 March 2017	Manohar Parrikar	BJP	9,862	63.4	Girish Chodankar	INC	5,059	32.56	4,803
11	Panaji	11 March 2017	The Panaji Assembly bypoll was held after Manohar Parrikar was sworn in as Chief Minister of Goa without being a sitting member of the Legislative Assembly.								
11	Panaji	19 May 2019	Atanasio Monserrate	INC	8,748	52.33	Sidharth Kuncalienker	BJP	6,990	41.82	1,758
11	Panaji	19 May 2019	The Panaji Assembly bypoll was held following the demise of the incumbent MLA and Chief Minister, Manohar Parrikar.								
19	Valpoi	11 March 2017	Vishwajit Rane	BJP	16,188	70.19	Roy Naik	INC	6,101	26.45	10,087
19	Valpoi	11 March 2017	The Valpoi Assembly bypoll was held following the resignation of the incumbent MLA, Vishwajit Rane, after he switched parties.								
5	Mapusa	19 May 2019	Joshua De Souza	BJP	11,167	49.74	Sudhir Rama Kandolkar	INC	10,016	44.61	1,151
5	Mapusa	19 May 2019	The Mapusa Assembly bypoll was held following the death of the incumbent MLA, Francis D'Souza.								
22	Siroda	19 May 2019	Subhash Shirodkar	BJP	10,661	44.12	Deepak Dhavalikar	MGP	10,585	43.81	76
22	Siroda	19 May 2019	The Siroda Assembly bypoll was held following the resignation of the incumbent MLA, Subhash Shirodkar, after switching parties.								
1	Mandrem	19 May 2019	Dayanand Sopte	BJP	13,468	48.65	Jit Arolkar	IND	9,343	33.75	4,125
1	Mandrem	19 May 2019	The Mandrem Assembly bypoll was held following the resignation of the incumbent MLA, Dayanand Sopte, after switching parties.								

== See also ==
- 2017 elections in India
