= Roy de Chinchinim =

Indian playwright and actor (born 1984)

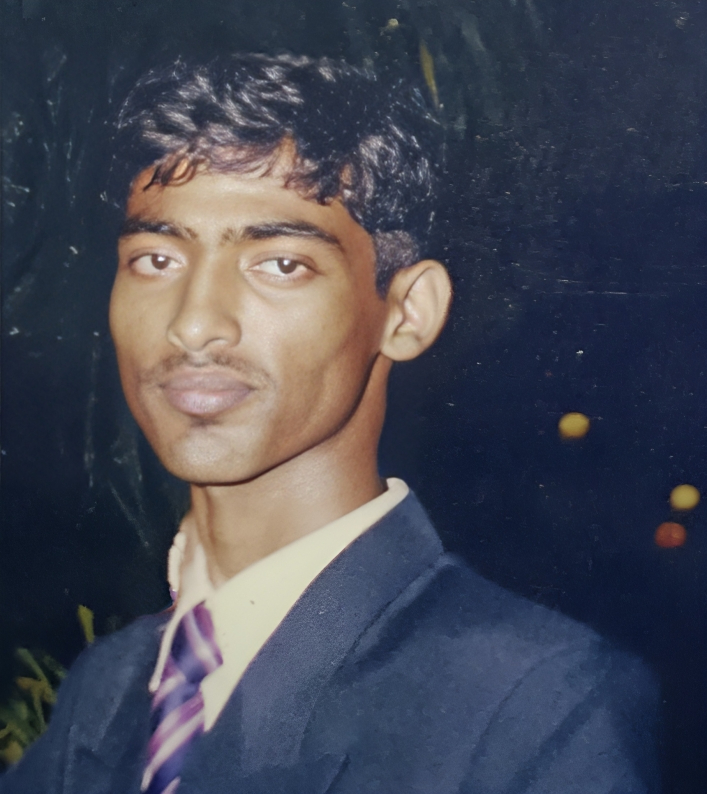
- Crasto in 2001
- Born: Roy Pio Crasto; 11 August 1984 (age 42); Margao, Goa, India
- Occupations: Playwright; director; actor; businessman
- Years active: 2000–present
- Organisation: All Goa Chicken Vendors (AGCV)
- Known for: Bogos Tankam (2012); Chorit Ravat Punn Ugddas Dhorat (2015)
- Spouse: Catty Tereza Gomes (m. 2013; sep. 2021)
- Children: 2
- Website: facebook.com/roypio.crasto

Roy Pio Crasto (born 11 August 1984), known professionally as Roy de Chinchinim, is an Indian playwright, director, and actor known for his work in khell tiatr and tiatr productions. He is best known for his plays Bogos Tankam (2012) and Chorit Ravat Punn Ugddas Dhorat (2015), the latter faced significant opposition due to its portrayal of the corrupt practices within the state's ruling government.

== Early life ==
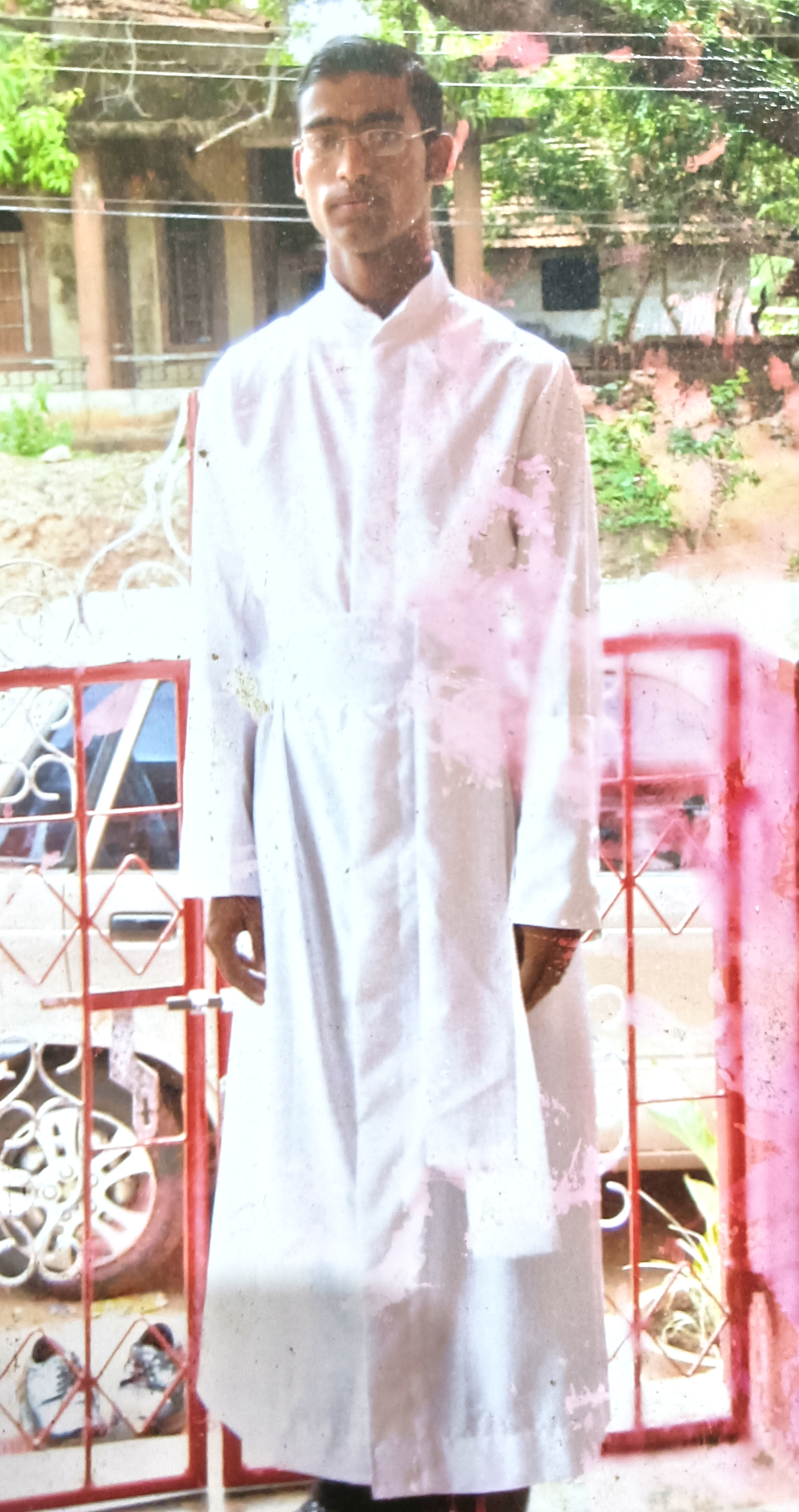
Crasto during his seminarian days in the late 2000s.

Roy Pio Crasto was born on 11 August 1984 in Margao, Goa to Menino Alvaro Crasto and Filomena Lucia Ludovico Monteiro. He is the youngest of four children, with his brothers Conbino and Alecisco, a seafarer, and his sister Romatha, who resides in Velim, Goa.

== Theatrical career ==
At the age of 17, Crasto embarked on his career as a tiatr playwright, earning public acclaim for his work. Around the age of 22, he entered the realm of Konkani stage by staging khell tiatrs during the Carnival season. His first notable work, Amkam Maf Kor (Forgive Us), marked his debut as a playwright and director. In the subsequent years, he went on to release two more tiatrs titled Tumi Sangat (You-All Tell) and Bhas Ditam (I Promise).

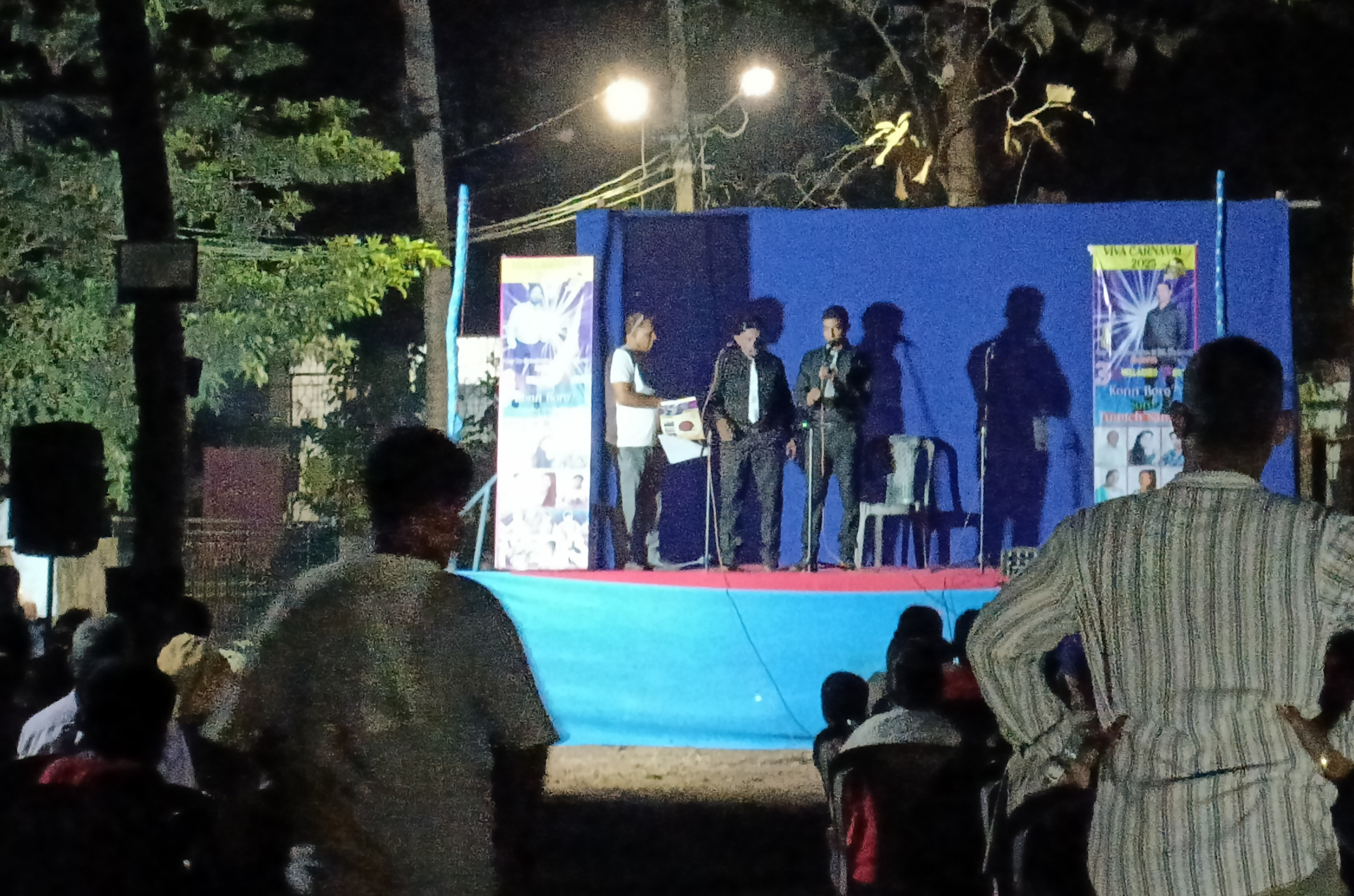
Crasto (extreme right) in his khell tiatr production Konn Boro? Soro! Tumich Sangat, staged at Assolna, 2025

In May 2012, Crasto presented his tiatr production titled Bogos Tankam (Forgive Them), where he portrayed the character of Joy, a businessman. The main cast of the drama included Clement, Francis de Areal, Martha, Clive, and Luciano. Comedians Betty, Amrish, and Ronny added humor to the performance. The songs in the production were sung by Agnelo de Dabolim, Marcus Vaz, Cameron Fernandes, Muriel, Martha, and Luciano.

On 24 November 2014, as part of the 5th Children's Tiatr Festival organized by the Tiatr Academy of Goa, Crasto showcased his theatrical production titled Bhurgeponn (Childhood) at Gomant Vidya Niketan in Margao, Goa.

During his extensive career spanning over two decades, Crasto has worked with a notable cast that includes Jose Fernandes, Evon Estibeiro, Anil Pednekar, and Olga Vaz. He has also been actively involved in supporting and promoting emerging talents such as Riston Gomes, Bunty Vas, Cameron Fernandes, and Allwin Colaco.

In November 2015, a tiatr titled Chorit Ravat Punn Ugddas Dhorat was released by Ben Vera Productions, with Crasto at the helm. This theatrical production aimed to shed light on a range of prevalent societal challenges faced by the country. The play showcased ensemble cast, featuring emerging artists like Vera, Espy, Dolfi, Miranda, Allwin, and Crasto, who portrayed the character of Paulu Uncle. Comedic elements were handled by Kenny, with support from Rickson and Allwin, adding levity and humor to the performance. The accompanying band, composed of musicians including Alex on saxophone, Joaquim on trumpet, Jacinto on keyboard, Remy on bass, and Francis on drums. The play also boasted a selection of songs, with contributions from artists such as Stancio, Judy, Evon, Jose, Anil, Olga, and others.

In August 2016, Crasto was selected to join the cast of the tiatr production Ghorv (Pride) under the direction of comedienne Gloria Ferrao. The drama shed light on a narrative that emphasized the indifference of affluent individuals towards the less fortunate, portraying how they often manipulate their emotions for personal gain.

In January 2025, Crasto was cast in the tiatr Dubav (Doubt) in the lead role of Menino, a seafarer. He played the role opposite Gloria Ferrao, who played Filomena. The play was part of the Kala Academy's tenth annual Tiatr 'B' Group Competition and was staged at Ravindra Bhavan in Margao. It was written and directed by Ferrao.

In February 2026, Crasto appeared in Gloria Ferrao's tiatr Chorak Dubhav Chan'neacho in a supporting role as Joao, the bachelor brother of the lead character Patrick. Ferrao also performed in the production, portraying Deepu. The tiatr was part of the Kala Academy’s 11th Tiatr 'B' Group competition.

== Other ventures ==
In December 2015, Crasto was involved in the practice of teaching at a catering institute located in Navelim, Goa.

As of January 2024, Crasto was involved in the poultry business as a chicken vendor. He is a member of the All Goa Chicken Vendors, which includes fellow local chicken vendors from Goa.

== Personal life ==
On 1 May 2013, Crasto married Catty Tereza Crasto (née Gomes), a homemaker from St Estevam. The couple had two sons. On 3 January 2015, they welcomed their first child, Rishon, and their second child, Ronaldo, was born in 2019. Soon after the birth of an illegitimate third child, Crasto separated from Catty after being together for nearly 8 years in 2021.

On 16 December 2015, Crasto's brother Conbino "Bino", aged 40, who worked as a store clerk for ExxonMobil, was shot to death by three gunmen in Cleveland, Texas, United States.

Crasto is based in the neighborhood of Bamado in Chinchinim, where his brothers resided. As of May 2018, he still lived there. His sister, Romatha, was also briefly involved in the Konkani music scene. She, along with her husband Bonifacio, released their Konkani audio album titled Rinn in 2016, which featured several popular tiatrists. It was well received by critics.

== Controversies ==
=== 2015 Nuvem physical assault ===
In November 2015, an incident occurred involving Crasto, during which he was targeted by unidentified individuals. The motive behind the attack was related to Crasto's upcoming theatrical production, which included politically themed songs. As Crasto was returning home after distributing tickets for his upcoming show. Without warning, he found himself the victim of an assault and immediately took action by filing a complaint. According to Crasto's statement, he was accosted by unidentified individuals at the Rajee Honda junction in Nuvem, Goa. The individuals forcefully grabbed his shirt, tearing it, and proceeded to issue threats, cautioning him about dire consequences if he proceeded with the staging of his tiatr. The motorcycle used in the incident had no visible number plate.

The police responded to the incident by registering a non-cognizable complaint and subsequently launching an investigation into the matter. The tiatrists, a community of theater performers, vehemently denounced the use of intimidation tactics targeting their fellow artists and remained resolute to persevere in staging their shows. They commended the Margao police for their efforts in preventing any disruptions by alleged supporters of Nuvem MLA Mickky Pacheco, who were believed to be involved in the incident. Crasto, along with Tousif de Navelim, earned a reputation for their controversial dramas, which shed light on various organizations and the actions of the ruling government, exposing hard-hitting truths.

=== 2024 All Goa Chicken Vendors opposition ===
In January 2024, Crasto, who was a member of the All Goa Chicken Vendors, made a disclosure regarding alleged interference by the All Goa Poultry Shopkeepers Association (AGPSA) in the chicken trading industry. The matter originated in July 2023 when individuals claiming to represent poultry owners approached Crasto and other members of the chicken vendors' community. Over time, this group transformed into the AGPSA, appointing key officials, including a president and vice president, without informing the All Goa Chicken Vendors. The AGPSA did not effectively disclose clear details regarding its formation as an organization operating under specific rules and regulations. As part of their actions, the AGPSA imposed increased fees for shop registration and membership. Specifically, the new fee structure required shop owners to pay ₹10,000 (US$100) for registration and ₹4,500 (US$47) for membership within an eight-day period. Failure to comply within the given timeframe would result in a substantial increase in the shop registration fee to ₹20,000 (US$210) per store, with the AGPSA issuing threats of closure for non-compliant businesses.

== Selected stage works ==
Year	Title	Role	Notes	Ref
	Amkam Maf Kor	Writer/director	Professional debut	
	Tumi Sangat	Writer/director	Play	
	Bhas Ditam	Writer/director	Play	
2006	Bogos Amkam; Painnem; Bhas Diat	Writer/director	Street play	
2008	Amkam Fudar Na?; Tuka Utor Ditam; Goemche Ganti	Writer/director	Street play	
2012	Bogos Tankam	Joy	Also writer & director	
2014	Bhurgeponn	Writer/director	Play	
2015	Chorit Ravat Punn Ugddas Dhorat	Paulu Uncle	Also writer & director	
2016	Ragar; Bazar; Fuddar	Writer/director	Street play	
2016	Ghorv	Actor	Play	
2018	Adhar; Fuddar; Upkar	Writer/director	Street play	
2020	Fotovlom; Foslom; Boro Zalom	Writer/director	Street play	
2023	Fuddar Bhurgeancho; Konn Samballttolo; Tumi Sangat	Writer/director	Street play	
2025	Dubav	Menino	Lead role	
2025	Konn Boro?; Soro!; Tumich Sangat.	Writer/director	Street play	
2026	Chorak Dubhav Chan'neacho	Joao	Supporting role	
