= 5th Goa Assembly =

The Fifth Goa Assembly (term: 2007–2012) was the unicameral legislature of the state of Goa in western India. It consisted of 40 members. Digambar Kamat of the Indian National Congress was sworn in as the 19th chief minister of Goa in June 2007.

== Members ==
No.	Constituency	Winner	Party	Remark
1	Mandrem	Laxmikant Parsekar	Bharatiya Janata Party	
2	Pernem	Dayanand Sopte	Bharatiya Janata Party	
3	Dargalim	Manohar Ajgaonkar	Indian National Congress	
4	Tivim	Nilkanth Halarnkar	Nationalist Congress Party	
5	Mapusa	Francis D'Souza	Bharatiya Janata Party	
6	Siolim	Dayanand Mandrekar	Bharatiya Janata Party	
7	Calangute	Agnelo Fernandes	Indian National Congress	
8	Saligao	Dilip Parulekar	Bharatiya Janata Party	
9	Aldona	Dayanand Narvekar	Indian National Congress	
10	Panaji	Manohar Parrikar	Bharatiya Janata Party	
11	Taleigao	Babush Monserrate	United Goans Democratic Party	
12	Santa Cruz	Victoria Fernandes	Indian National Congress	
13	St. Andre	Francisco Silveira	Indian National Congress	
14	Cumbarjua	Pandurang Madkaikar	Indian National Congress	
15	Bicholim	Rajesh Patnekar	Bharatiya Janata Party	
16	Maem	Anant Shet	Bharatiya Janata Party	
17	Pale	Gurudas Gauns	Indian National Congress	Expired
18	Poriem	Pratapsing Rane	Indian National Congress	
19	Valpoi	Vishwajit Pratapsingh Rane	Independent	Joined INC and re-elected
20	Ponda	Ravi Naik	Indian National Congress	
21	Priol	Deepak Dhavalikar	Maharashtrawadi Gomantak Party	
22	Marcaim	Ramkrishna 'Sudin' Dhavalikar	Maharashtrawadi Gomantak Party	
23	Shiroda	Mahadev Naik	Bharatiya Janata Party	
24	Mormugao	Milind Naik	Bharatiya Janata Party	
25	Vasco Da Gama	Jose Philip D'Souza	Nationalist Congress Party	
26	Cortalim	Mauvin Godinho	Indian National Congress	
27	Loutolim	Aleixo Sequeira	Indian National Congress	
28	Benaulim	Mickky Pacheco	Nationalist Congress Party	
29	Fatorda	Damodar Naik	Bharatiya Janata Party	
30	Margao	Digambar Kamat	Indian National Congress	
31	Curtorim	Aleixo Lourenco	Save Goa Front	
32	Navelim	Churchill Alemao	Save Goa Front	
33	Velim	Filipe Nery Rodrigues	Indian National Congress	
34	Cuncolim	Joaquim Alemao	Indian National Congress	
35	Sanvordem	Anil Salgaocar	Independent	
36	Sanguem	Vasudev Gaonkar	Bharatiya Janata Party	
37	Curchorem	Shyam Satardekar	Indian National Congress	
38	Quepem	Chandrakant 'Babu' Kavlekar	Indian National Congress	
39	Canacona	Vijay Pai Khot	Bharatiya Janata Party	
40	Poinguinim	Ramesh Tawadkar	Bharatiya Janata Party	
