= 2007 Goa Legislative Assembly election =

Election in Indian state

- 2 June 2007

All 40 seats in the Assembly 21 seats needed for a majority
- Turnout: 70% (▲1.25%)
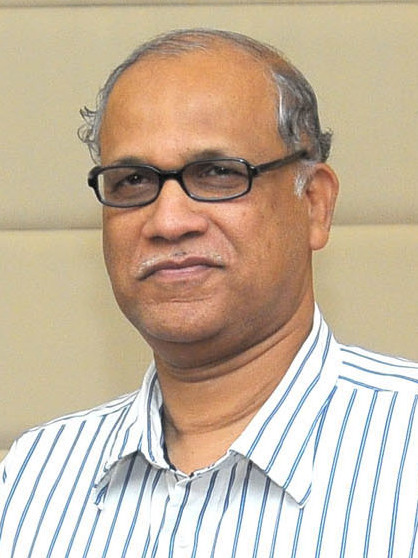

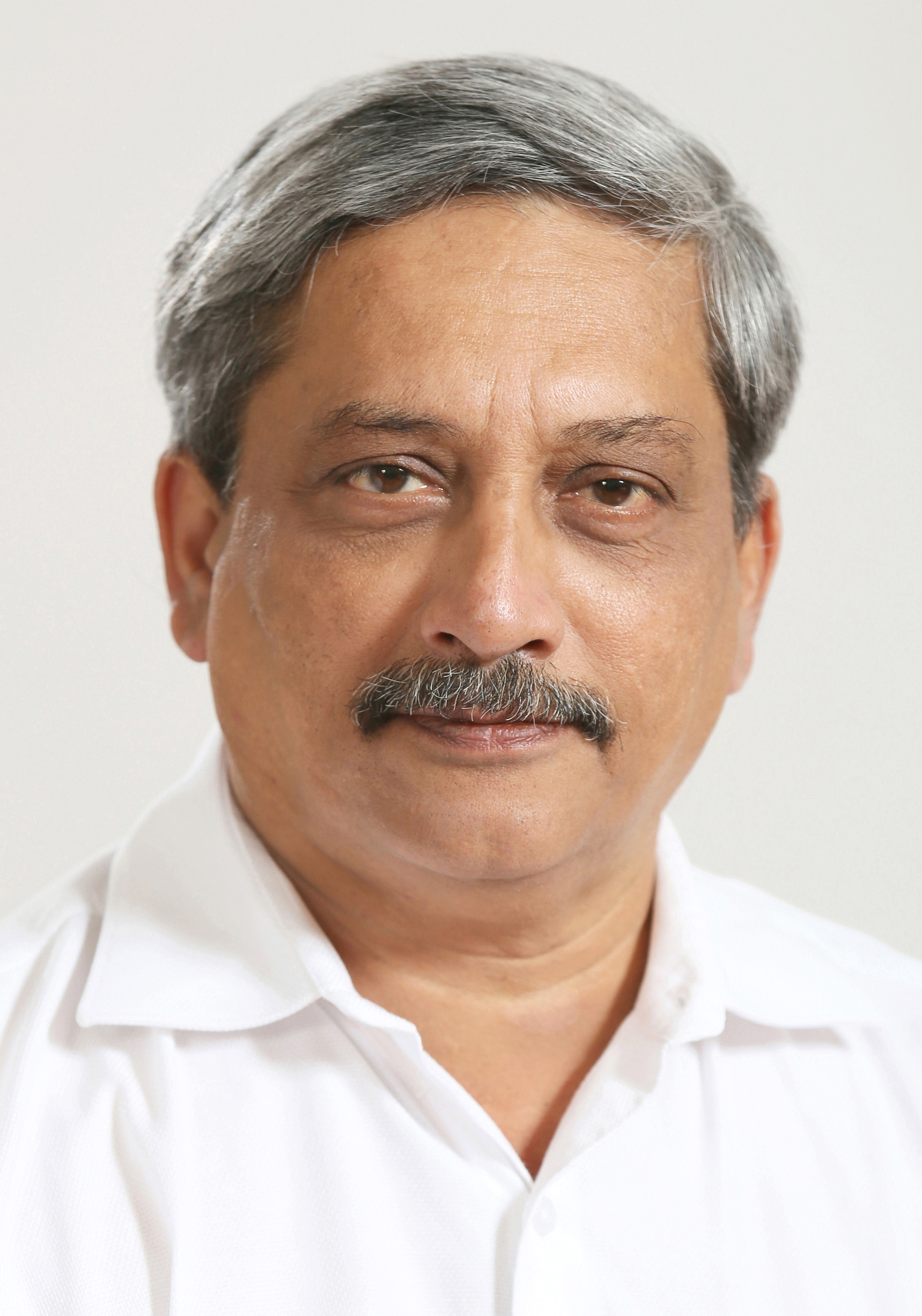
	Majority party	Minority party
Leader	Digambar Kamat	Manohar Parrikar
Party	INC	BJP
Leader's seat	Margao Assembly constituency	Panaji Assembly constituency
Seats won	16	14
Seat change	Steady	▼3
Chief Minister before election
Pratapsingh Rane
INC
Elected Chief Minister
Digambar Kamat
INC

Elections in the Indian state of Goa took place on 2 June 2007. Counting of votes began on 5 June, and the election process was completed by 8 June.

== Results ==
Rank	Party	Seats Contested	Seats Won
1	Indian National Congress	32	16
3	Nationalist Congress Party	6	3
4	Save Goa Front	17	2
2	Bharatiya Janata Party	33	14
4	Maharashtrawadi Gomantak	26	2
5	United Goans Democratic Party	11	1
4	Independent	49	2
	Total		40

=== Results by constituency ===
Winner, runner-up, voter turnout, and victory margin in every constituency
Assembly Constituency		Turnout	Winner				Runner Up				Margin
#k	Names	%	Candidate	Party	Votes	%	Candidate	Party	Votes	%	Margin
1	Mandrem	80.01%	Laxmikant Parsekar	BJP	5,858	35.54%	Ramakant Khalap	INC	4,148	25.17%	1,710
2	Pernem	80.69%	Dayanand Sopte	BJP	7,272	46.58%	Deshprabhu Jitendra Raghuraj	INC	4,827	30.92%	2,445
3	Mapusa	64.87%	Francis D'Souza	BJP	10,104	54.95%	Subhash G. Narvekar	JD(S)	3,258	17.72%	6,846
4	Tivim	72.48%	Nilkant Halarnkar	NCP	8,768	44.37%	Sadanand Shet Tanavade	BJP	8,444	42.73%	324
5	Bicholim	79.25%	Rajesh Patnekar	BJP	9,352	50.91%	Naresh Sawal	INC	6,657	36.24%	2,695
6	Panaji	70.72%	Manohar Parrikar	BJP	6,004	56.83%	Dinar Purshottam Kamat Tarcar	INC	4,560	43.17%	1,444
7	Ponda	66.25%	Ravi Naik	INC	9,972	40.61%	Mamledar Lavoo	MGP	8,316	33.86%	1,656
8	Siroda	77.17%	Mahadev Naik	BJP	9,725	48.86%	Shirodkar Subhash Ankush	INC	9,476	47.61%	249
9	Quepem	75.47%	Babu Kavlekar	INC	9,474	44.57%	Prakash Velip	BJP	8,311	39.1%	1,163
10	Curchorem	70.32%	Shyam Satardekar	INC	10,628	52.99%	Ramrao Dessai	BJP	8,729	43.53%	1,899
11	Mormugao	61.11%	Milind Naik	BJP	7,769	43.95%	Vaz Giovanni Karl	INC	5,363	30.34%	2,406
12	Siolim	70.21%	Dayanand Mandrekar	BJP	7,402	41.07%	Paliemkar Uday	Independent	5,400	29.96%	2,002
13	Calangute	70.08%	Agnelo Fernandes	INC	8,319	42.66%	Joseph Sequeira	UGDP	5,558	28.5%	2,761
14	St. Cruz	69.19%	Victoria Fernandes	INC	7,385	36.34%	Hoble Anil Raghuvir	BJP	6,040	29.72%	1,345
15	Cumbarjua	73.13%	Pandurang Madkaikar	INC	10,016	49.29%	Nirmala P. Sawant	Independent	9,445	46.48%	571
16	St. Andre	68.64%	Francisco Silveira	INC	8,593	56.4%	Caiado Antonio Joao	BJP	6,074	39.87%	2,519
17	Cuncolim	62.94%	Joaquim Alemao (Note: Expired)	INC	8,909	58.62%	Fernandes Jorson Piedade	UGDP	3,408	22.42%	5,501
18	Curtorim	64.79%	Reginaldo Lourenco	Save Goa Front	9,320	54.18%	Sardinha Cosme Francisco Caitano	INC	7,493	43.56%	1,827
19	Taleigao	66.82%	Atanasio Monserrate (Note: Joined INC and re-elected)	UGDP	9,641	49.77%	Silveira Agnelo Mariano	BJP	5,619	29.%	4,022
20	Maem	82.08%	Anant Shet	BJP	5,370	34.19%	Pravin Zantye	INC	4,890	31.13%	480
21	Saligao	69.95%	Dilip Parulekar	BJP	6,639	43.09%	Wilfred de Souza	NCP	4,682	30.39%	1,957
22	Poriem	77.94%	Pratapsingh Rane	INC	10,605	58.52%	Vassudeo Ramnath Parab	BJP	6,869	37.9%	3,736
23	Priol	77.92%	Deepak Dhavalikar	MGP	10,591	51.03%	Vishwas Satarkar	BJP	6,266	30.19%	4,325
24	Sanvordem	76.84%	Anil Salgaocar	Independent	10,705	54.52%	Vinay D. Tendulkar	BJP	3,782	19.26%	6,923
25	Dargalim	79.67%	Manohar Ajgaonkar	INC	5,049	38.77%	Morajkar Vithu	BJP	4,275	32.83%	774
26	Aldona	68.86%	Dayanand Narvekar	INC	9,251	42.53%	Kunda Chodankar	BJP	6,217	28.58%	3,034
27	Pale	78.94%	Gurudas Gauns	INC	7,768	41.77%	Amonkar Suresh Kuso	BJP	6,177	33.21%	1,591
28	Valpoi	79.25%	Vishwajit Rane	Independent	8,590	61.35%	Gaonkar Puti	BJP	5,041	36.%	3,549
29	Marcaim	77.49%	Sudin Dhavalikar	MGP	12,141	63.3%	Govind Gaude	INC	4,532	23.63%	7,609
30	Vasco Da Gama	58.63%	Jose Philip D'Souza	NCP	7,476	39.18%	Rajendra Arlekar	BJP	6,864	35.97%	612
31	Cortalim	63.46%	Mauvin Godinho	INC	9,532	42.98%	Mathany Saldanha	UGDP	7,850	35.4%	1,682
32	Loutolim	65.69%	Aleixo Sequeira	INC	6,435	43.3%	Fernandes Piedade Remegio (Remy)	Save Goa Front	4,894	32.93%	1,541
33	Benaulim	66.83%	Mickky Pacheco	NCP	8,092	51.63%	John Fernandes	Save Goa Front	7,336	46.8%	756
34	Fatorda	60.73%	Damodar (Damu) G. Naik	BJP	7,943	40.09%	Vijay Sardessai	INC	6,172	31.15%	1,771
35	Margao	62.03%	Digambar Kamat	INC	9,198	52.7%	Sharmad Raiturkar	BJP	7,170	41.08%	2,028
36	Navelim	65.79%	Churchill Alemao	Save Goa Front	13,500	58.71%	Luizinho Faleiro	INC	8,996	39.12%	4,504
37	Velim	64.57%	Filipe Nery Rodrigues	INC	7,965	60.45%	Silva Benjamin	Save Goa Front	5,211	39.55%	2,754
38	Sanguem	74.14%	Vasudev Gaonkar	BJP	7,754	53.15%	Minguelino D'Costa	INC	5,449	37.35%	2,305
39	Canacona	75.51%	Pai Khot Vijay	BJP	7,577	50.%	Bandekar Sanjay Vimal	INC	6,868	45.32%	709
40	Poinguinim	77.65%	Ramesh Tawadkar	BJP	6,158	50.83%	Fernandes Isidore Aleixinho	INC	5,958	49.17%	200

== By-elections ==
No.	Constituency	Winner	Party	Margin	Remark
1	Pale	Pratap Gauns	INC		
2	Valpoi	Vishwajit Pratapsingh Rane	INC		

== Government formation ==
Indian National Congress in alliance with Nationalist Congress Party and Save Goa Front formed the government.
