= Caitu Silva =

Indian politician

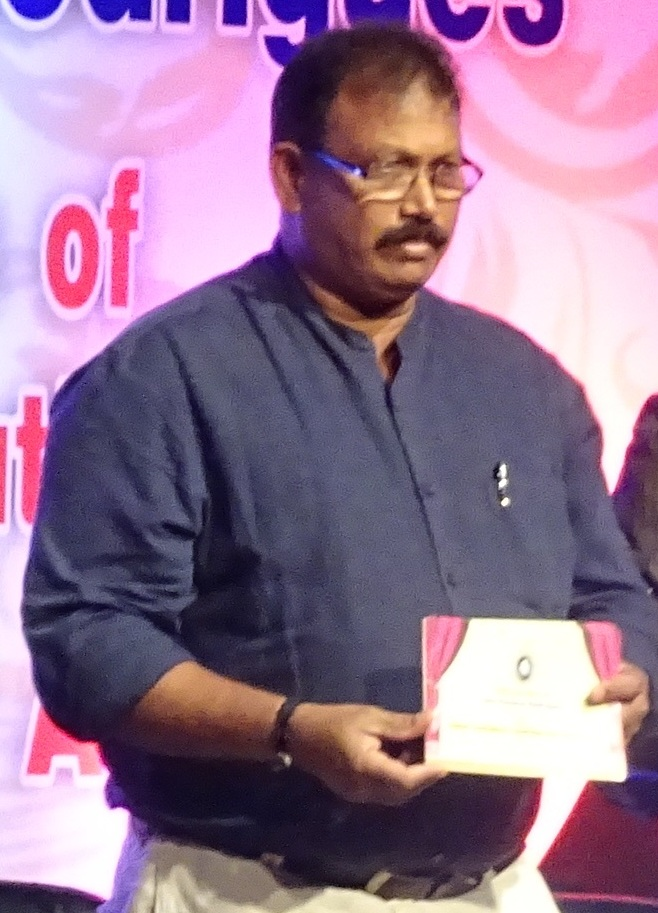
- Silva in 2016

Member of Goa Legislative Assembly
- In office 2012–2017
- Preceded by: Mickky Pacheco
- Succeeded by: Churchill Alemao
- Constituency: Benaulim

Personal details
- Born: Caetano Silva
- Party: Indian National Congress (since 2019)
- Other political affiliations: Goa Vikas Party (until 2019)
- Education: 5th Pass
- Profession: Businessman

Caetano Rossario "Caitu" Silva is an Indian politician who was elected to the Goa Legislative Assembly from Benaulim in the 2012 Goa Legislative Assembly election as a member of the Goa Vikas Party. He joined Indian National Congress in April 2019.
