= Manoharpur Assembly constituency =

Constituency of the Jharkhand legislative assembly in India

Coordinates: 22.37°N 85.20°E

Manoharpur
- Constituency No. 55 for the Jharkhand Legislative Assembly

Constituency details
- Country: India
- Region: East India
- State: Jharkhand
- District: West Singhbhum
- Lok Sabha constituency: Singhbhum
- Established: 2000
- Total electors: 197,524
- Reservation: ST

Member of Legislative Assembly
- 5th Jharkhand Legislative Assembly
- Incumbent Jagat Majhi
- Party: JMM
- Alliance: MGB
- Elected year: 2024

Manoharpur Assembly constituency is an assembly constituency in the Indian state of Jharkhand.

Most successful parties after separate Jharkhand state.
1. JMM (60.0%)
2. UGDP (20.0%)
3. BJP (20.0%)

== Members of the Legislative Assembly ==
Election	Member	Party
Bihar Legislative Assembly
1952	Subhnath Deogam	Jharkhand Party
1957	Subhnath Deogam	Jharkhand Party
1962	Subhnath Deogam	Janata Party
1967	Ratnakar Nayak	Sanghata Socialist Party
1969	Ratnakar Nayak	Independent politician
1972	Durga Prasad Jamuda	Indian National Congress
1977	Ratnakar Nayak	Independent politician
1980	Ratnakar Nayak	Bharatiya Janata Party
1985	Devendra Manjhi	Independent politician
1990	Krishna Chandra Munda	Indian National Congress
1995	Joba Majhi	Jharkhand People's Party
2000	Joba Majhi	United Goans Democratic Party
Jharkhand Legislative Assembly
2005	Joba Majhi	United Goans Democratic Party
2009	Gurucharan Nayak	Bharatiya Janata Party
2014	Joba Majhi	Jharkhand Mukti Morcha
2019	Joba Majhi	Jharkhand Mukti Morcha
2024	Jagat Majhi	Jharkhand Mukti Morcha

== Election results ==
=== Assembly election 2024 ===
2024 Jharkhand Legislative Assembly election: Manoharpur
Party	Candidate	Votes	%	±%
JMM	Jagat Majhi	73,034	51.53%	▲9.41
AJSU	Dinesh Chandra Boipai	41,078	28.98%	▲17.85
JLKM	Dilbar Khakha	6,927	4.89%	New
Independent	Shiukar Purty	3,306	2.33%	New
NCP	Saban Hembrom	3,193	2.25%	New
Independent	Pator Jonko	2,210	1.56%	New
Jharkhand Party	Mahender Jamuda	1,856	1.31%	▼1.04
NOTA	None of the Above	5,347	3.77%	▲0.79
Margin of victory		31,956	22.55%	▲9.30
Turnout		1,41,737	64.02%	▲2.78
Registered electors		2,21,411		▲12.09
JMM hold		Swing	▲9.41	

=== Assembly election 2019 ===
2019 Jharkhand Legislative Assembly election: Manoharpur
Party	Candidate	Votes	%	±%
JMM	Joba Majhi	50,945	42.12%	▼3.04
BJP	Gurucharan Nayak	34,926	28.87%	▼3.28
AJSU	Birsa Munda	13,468	11.13%	New
JVM(P)	Sushila Toppo	3,557	2.94%	New
API	Sushil Dang	2,952	2.44%	New
Jharkhand Party	Saban Hembrom	2,836	2.34%	▲1.24
JD(U)	Dimpal Munda	1,674	1.38%	New
NOTA	None of the Above	3,608	2.98%	▼0.39
Margin of victory		16,019	13.24%	▲0.24
Turnout		1,20,962	61.24%	▼7.47
Registered electors		1,97,524		▲6.48
JMM hold		Swing	▼3.04	

=== Assembly election 2014 ===
2014 Jharkhand Legislative Assembly election: Manoharpur
Party	Candidate	Votes	%	±%
JMM	Joba Majhi	57,558	45.16%	▲23.45
BJP	Gurucharan Nayak	40,989	32.16%	▲4.00
JBSP	Birsa Munda	6,434	5.05%	▼0.51
INC	Subhash Nag	5,177	4.06%	▼1.45
Independent	Snehlata Jojo	4,461	3.50%	New
BSP	Pardeshi Lal Munda	2,638	2.07%	New
Jharkhand Party	Moran Singh Chaki	1,414	1.11%	New
NOTA	None of the Above	4,297	3.37%	New
Margin of victory		16,569	13.00%	▲6.55
Turnout		1,27,463	68.71%	▲5.99
Registered electors		1,85,511		▲19.73
JMM gain from BJP		Swing	▲17.00	

=== Assembly election 2009 ===
2009 Jharkhand Legislative Assembly election: Manoharpur
Party	Candidate	Votes	%	±%
BJP	Guru Charan Nayak	27,360	28.16%	▼0.70
JMM	Navami Oraon	21,090	21.70%	▲4.34
UGDP	Joba Majhi	20,828	21.43%	▼9.25
NCP	Salkhan Murmu	6,490	6.68%	New
JBSP	Indrajit Samad	5,397	5.55%	New
INC	Sushil Barla	5,357	5.51%	New
Independent	Sushila Toppo	2,639	2.72%	New
Margin of victory		6,270	6.45%	▲4.62
Turnout		97,172	62.72%	▲4.68
Registered electors		1,54,936		▲2.89
BJP gain from UGDP		Swing	▼2.52	

=== Assembly election 2005 ===
2005 Jharkhand Legislative Assembly election: Manoharpur
Party	Candidate	Votes	%	±%
UGDP	Joba Majhi	26,810	30.68%	▼4.66
BJP	Guru Charan Nayak	25,213	28.85%	▲4.29
JMM	Sukhdev Hembrom	15,173	17.36%	▲5.23
AJSU	Sugyani Kodah	7,787	8.91%	New
Independent	Hardugan Manki	3,947	4.52%	New
Jharkhand Vikas Dal	Sangi Murmu	1,688	1.93%	New
RJD	Jaipal Singh Purty	1,617	1.85%	New
Margin of victory		1,597	1.83%	▼8.96
Turnout		87,386	58.03%	▼3.47
Registered electors		1,50,580		▲10.56
UGDP hold		Swing	▼4.66	

=== Assembly election 2000 ===
2000 Bihar Legislative Assembly election: Manoharpur
Party	Candidate	Votes	%	±%
UGDP	Joba Majhi	29,607	35.34%	New
BJP	Shiva Bodra	20,572	24.56%	New
JMM	Laxman Melgandi	10,161	12.13%	New
SP	Gurucharan Nayak	10,010	11.95%	New
Jharkhand Party	Masihdas Bhuinya	5,989	7.15%	New
INC	Gurga Parasad Jamuda	3,928	4.69%	New
BSP	Anand Guria	1,117	1.33%	New
Margin of victory		9,035	10.79%	
Turnout		83,767	63.03%	
Registered electors		1,36,195		
UGDP win (new seat)				

== See also ==
- Vidhan Sabha
- List of states of India by type of legislature
