= 2012 Goa Legislative Assembly election =

Election in Indian state

- March 3, 2012

All 40 assembly constituencies 21 seats needed for a majority
- Turnout: 82.94% (▲12.94%)
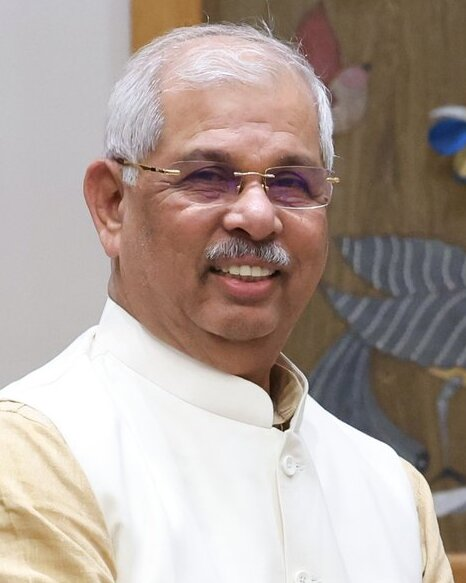

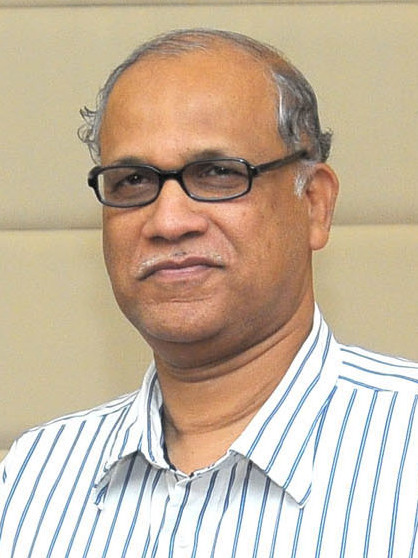

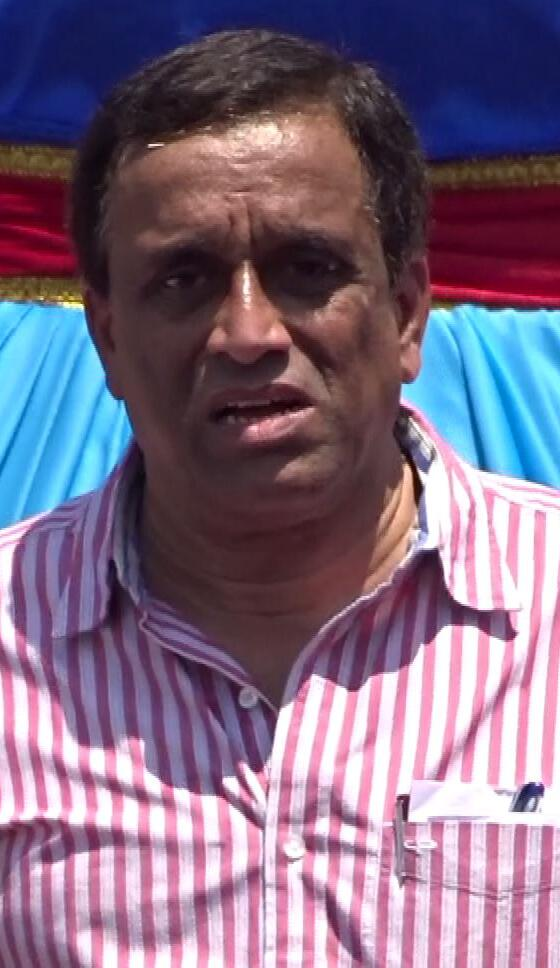

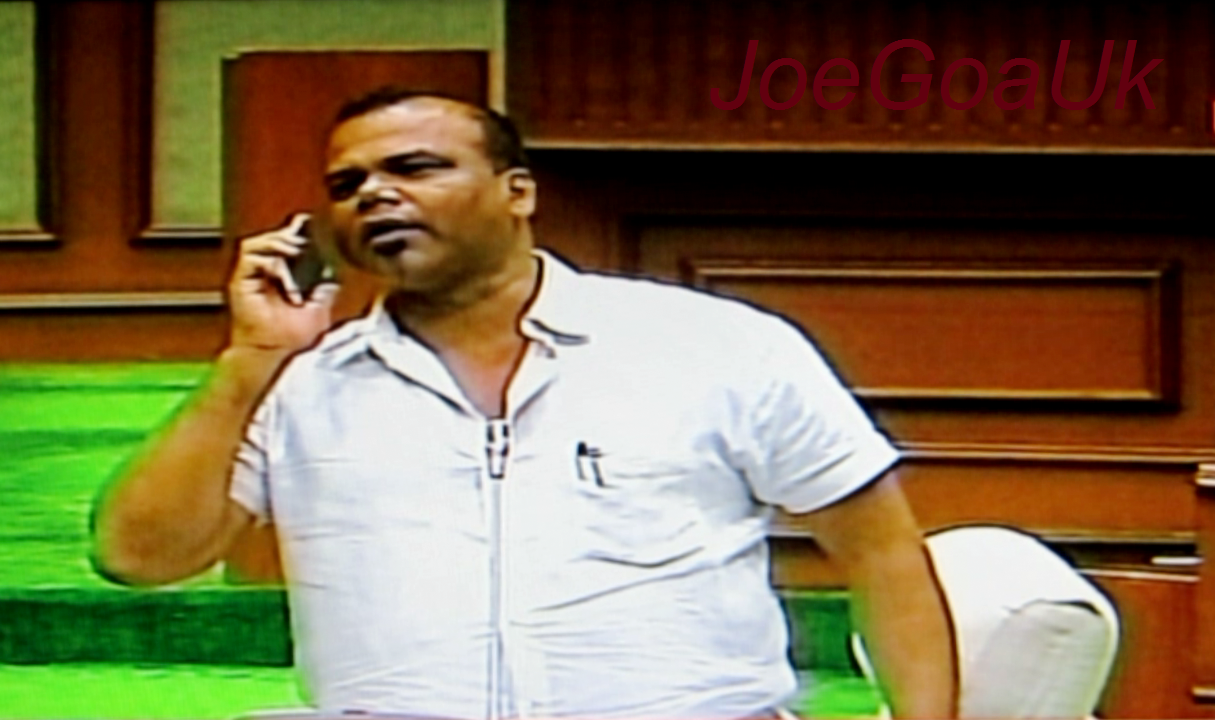
| | Majority party | Minority party |
|---|---|---|
| Leader | Rajendra Arlekar | Digambar Kamat |
| Party | BJP | INC |
| Alliance | NDA | UPA |
| Leader since | 1994 | 1994 |
| Leader's seat | Pernem (won) | Margao |
| Last election | 14 | 16 |
| Seats won | 21 | 9 |
| Seat change | ▲7 | ▼7 |
| | Third party | Fourth party |
| Leader | Sudin Dhavalikar | Francisco Pacheco |
| Party | MGP | GVP |
| Alliance | NDA | NDA |
| Leader since | 1999 | 2012 |
| Leader's seat | Marcaim | Nuvem |
| Last election | 2 | new party |
| Seats won | 3 | 2 |
| Seat change | ▲1 | ▲2 |

- Structure of the Goa Legislative Assembly after the election
Chief Minister before election
Digambar Kamat
INC
Elected Chief Minister
Manohar Parrikar
BJP

The Goa legislative assembly election was held on 3 March 2012, to select the 40 members of the Sixth Goa Legislative Assembly, as the term of 5th Goa Legislative Assembly ended in March 2012.

The result was announced on 6 March. The Bharatiya Janata Party-Maharashtrawadi Gomantak alliance defeated the incumbent Indian National Congress government in Goa led by Chief Minister Digambar Kamat with 24 seats in the 40-seat assembly. The Bharatiya Janata Party won 21 seats, while the Maharashtrawadi Gomantak Party won 3 seats. The MLA with the biggest margin of victory was the incumbent MLA Frances D'Souza of the Bharatiya Janata Party (BJP). Former chief minister Manohar Parrikar was sworn in as the new chief minister on 9 March.

== Timetable ==
The timetable of the electoral events are:

| Event | Date |
|---|---|
| Issue of Notification | 6 February |
| Candidature filing deadling | 13 February |
| Clearance of nominees | 14 February |
| Candidature withdrawal deadline | 16 February |
| Election | 3 March |
| Result | 6 March |
| Deadline to finish election | 9 March |

== Parties ==
The Indian National Congress (INC), Nationalist Congress Party (NCP), All India Trinamool Congress (AITC) and the Bharatiya Janata Party (BJP) are the national political parties in the fray. Other regional parties include the Maharashtrawadi Gomantak, Goa Vikas Party, United Goans Democratic Party and Go Su-raj Party.

== Issues ==
The issue of the cultural identity of Goa has also come to the fore in the past few years. The population of Goa has rapidly swelled due to increasing migration levels from neighboring Karnataka and Maharashtra, as well as from further afield such as Uttar Pradesh and Bihar.

=== Corruption ===
Following the 2011 Indian anti-corruption movement several allegations of corruption have been made on the incumbent government going to elections this year.

Nepotism was also an issue. Former CM and current head of the Goa TMC Wilfred de Souza accused the INC of perpetrating a "Family Raj" in its allotment of tickets for the election to relatives of INC leaders from such families as the Naiks, Alemaos, Ranes, and Monserrates. He also cited the denial of an electoral ticket to his son-in-law Tulio D’Souza in Saligao Assembly constituency despite the INC also denying him a ticket.

He also criticized the inability of incumbent CM Digambar Kamat to have stopped illegal mining while he was the minister of mining and finance minister in the previous government. He cited a report by a commission led by Justice M. B. Shah to investigate illegal mining in the country that suggested potential revenue of US$423 million was lost through illegal ore exports after he said he had seen a "leaked" version of the report.

== Parties and alliances ==
United Progressive Alliance
| Party | Flag | Symbol | Leader | Seats |
| Indian National Congress | | | Digambar Kamat | 33 |
| Nationalist Congress Party | | | Sharad Pawar | 7 |
| Total | | | | 40 |

National Democratic Alliance
| Party | Flag | Symbol | Leader | Seats |
| Bharatiya Janata Party | | | Manohar Parrikar | 28 |
| Maharashtrawadi Gomantak Party | | | Sudin Dhavalikar | 7 |
| Independent | | | | 4 |
| Total | | | | 39 |

== List of candidates ==
| Constituency | | | | | |
| Constituency | | NDA | | UPA | |
| 1 | Mandrem | BJP | Laxmikant Parsekar | INC | Dayanand Raghunath Sopte |
| 2 | Pernem | BJP | Rajendra Arlekar | INC | Manohar Trimbak Ajgaoankar |
| 3 | Bicholim | BJP | Manohar Pandurang Shirodkar | INC | Rajesh T. Patnekar |
| 4 | Tivim | BJP | Kiran Mohan Kandolkar | NCP | Nilkanth Ramnath Halarnkar |
| 5 | Mapusa | BJP | Francis D'Souza | NCP | Ashish Tulshidas Shirodkar |
| 6 | Siolim | BJP | Dayanand Mandrekar | INC | Uday Dattaram Paliemkar |
| 7 | Saligao | BJP | Dilip Parulekar | NCP | Suresh V. Parulekar |
| 8 | Calangute | BJP | Michael Vincent Lobo | INC | Agnelo Nicholas Fernandes |
| 9 | Porvorim | BJP | Govind Parvatkar | NCP | Fermeena P. Khaunte |
| 10 | Aldona | BJP | Ticlo Glenn J V A E Souza | INC | Dayanand G. Narvekar |
| 11 | Panaji | BJP | Manohar Parrikar | INC | Yatin Parekh |
| 12 | Taleigao | BJP | Dattaprasad Madhukar Naik | INC | Jennifer A. Monserrate |
| 13 | St. Cruz | MGP | Dinar Purshottam Kamat Tarcar | INC | Atanasio J. Monserrate |
| 14 | St. Andre | BJP | Vishnu Surya Naik Wagh | INC | Francisco Silveira |
| 15 | Cumbarjua | Ind. | Nirmala P. Sawant | INC | Pandurang A. Madkaikar |
| 16 | Maem | BJP | Anant Shet | NCP | Rudresh Chodankar |
| 17 | Sanquelim | BJP | Pramod Sawant | INC | Pratap Gauns |
| 18 | Poriem | BJP | Vishwajit Krishnarao Rane | INC | Pratapsingh Raoji Rane |
| 19 | Valpoi | BJP | Satyavijay Subrai Naik | INC | Vishwajit Pratapsingh Rane |
| 20 | Priol | MGP | Pandurang Alias Deepak Dhavalikar | INC | Dhaku A. Madkaikar |
| 21 | Ponda | MGP | Lavoo Mamledar | INC | Ravi Naik |
| 22 | Siroda | BJP | Mahadev Narayan Naik | INC | Subhash Ankush Shirodkar |
| 23 | Marcaim | MGP | Ramkrishna Alias Sudin Dhavalikar | INC | Ritesh Naik |
| 24 | Mormugao | BJP | Milind Sagun Naik | INC | Sankalp Padmanabh Amonkar |
| 25 | Vasco-da-Gama | BJP | Jose Luis Carlos Almeida | NCP | Jose Filepe D'Souza |
| 26 | Dabolim | MGP | Premanand Nanoskar | INC | Mauvin Heliodoro Godinho |
| 27 | Cortalim | BJP | Matanhy Saldanha | INC | Caitan Xavier |
| 28 | Nuvem | MGP | Prabhakar Rupo Gaude | INC | Aleixo Sequeira |
| 29 | Curtorim | Ind. | Domnic Gaonkar | INC | Aleixo Reginaldo Lourenco |
| 30 | Fatorda | BJP | Damodar (Damu) G. Naik | INC | M. K. Shaikh |
| 31 | Margao | BJP | Mahatme Rupesh | INC | Digambar Kamat |
| 32 | Benaulim | Did not contest | | INC | Valanka Alemao |
| 33 | Navelim | Ind. | Avertano Furtado | INC | Churchill Alemao |
| 34 | Cuncolim | BJP | Subhash Alias Rajan Kashinath Naik | INC | Alemao Joaquim |
| 35 | Velim | Ind. | Benjamin Silva | INC | Filipe Nery Rodrigues |
| 36 | Quepem | MGP | Prakash Arjun Velip | INC | Chandrakant Kavalekar |
| 37 | Curchorem | BJP | Nilesh Cabral | INC | Shyam Gopinath Satardekar |
| 38 | Sanvordem | BJP | Ganesh Chandru Gaonkar | INC | Govind Sawant |
| 39 | Sanguem | BJP | Subhash U. Phal Dessai | NCP | Alemao Yuri |
| 40 | Canacona | BJP | Ramesh Bombo Tawadkar | INC | Isidore Aleixinho Fernandes |

== Results ==
Summary of the Goa Legislative Assembly election, 2012 result
| Party | Seats contested | Seats won | Seat change | Vote share |
|---|---|---|---|---|
| Bharatiya Janata Party | 28 | 21 | ▲7 | 34.68% |
| Maharashtrawadi Gomantak Party | 7 | 3 | ▲1 | 6.72% |
| Indian National Congress | 34 | 9 | ▼7 | 30.78% |
| Nationalist Congress Party | 6 | 0 | ▼3 | 4.08% |
| United Goans Democratic Party | 7 | 0 | ▼1 | 1.17% |
| Goa Vikas Party | 9 | 2 | ▲2 | 3.5% |
| Save Goa Front | 0 | 0 | ▼2 | 0% |
| Independents | 72 | 5 | ▲3 | 16.67% |
| Total | — | 40 | — | — |

== Detailed results ==
| Constituency | | Winner | | | | Runner-up | | | | Margin | |
| Constituency | | Candidate | Party | Votes | % | Candidate | Party | Votes | % | Votes | % |
|---|---|---|---|---|---|---|---|---|---|---|---|
| 1 | Mandrem | Laxmikant Parsekar | BJP | 11,955 | 46.11 | Dayanand Raghunath Sopte | INC | 8,520 | 32.86 | 3,435 | 13.25 |
| 2 | Pernem (SC) | Rajendra Arlekar | BJP | 16,406 | 63.37 | Manohar Trimbak Ajgaoankar | INC | 8,053 | 31.10 | 8,353 | 32.27 |
| 3 | Bicholim | Naresh Rajaram Sawal | IND | 8,331 | 39.68 | Rajesh T. Patnekar | INC | 6,532 | 31.11 | 1,799 | 8.57 |
| 4 | Tivim | Kiran Mohan Kandolkar | BJP | 10,473 | 51.56 | Nilkanth Ramnath Halarnkar | NCP | 9,361 | 46.08 | 1,112 | 5.48 |
| 5 | Mapusa | Francis D'souza | BJP | 14,955 | 74.00 | Ashish Tulshidas Shirodkar | NCP | 4,786 | 23.68 | 10,169 | 50.32 |
| 6 | Siolim | Dayanand Mandrekar | BJP | 11,430 | 52.83 | Uday Dattaram Paliemkar | INC | 9,259 | 42.80 | 2,171 | 10.03 |
| 7 | Saligao | Dilip Parulekar | BJP | 10,084 | 51.96 | D'souza Tulio | IND | 4,276 | 22.03 | 5,808 | 29.93 |
| 8 | Calangute | Michael Vincent Lobo | BJP | 9,891 | 53.91 | Agnelo Nicholas Fernandes | INC | 8,022 | 43.72 | 1,869 | 10.19 |
| 9 | Porvorim | Rohan Khaunte | IND | 7,972 | 47.93 | Govind Parvatkar | BJP | 7,071 | 42.52 | 901 | 5.41 |
| 10 | Aldona | Ticlo Glenn J V A E Souza | BJP | 11,315 | 55.77 | Dayanand G. Narvekar | INC | 7,839 | 38.64 | 3,476 | 17.13 |
| 11 | Panaji | Manohar Parrikar | BJP | 11,086 | 66.13 | Yatin Parekh | INC | 5,018 | 29.93 | 6,068 | 36.20 |
| 12 | Taleigao | Jennifer A. Monserrate | INC | 10,682 | 50.88 | Dattaprasad Madhukar Naik | BJP | 9,531 | 45.39 | 1,151 | 5.49 |
| 13 | St. Cruz | Atanasio J. Monserrate | INC | 8,644 | 40.43 | Rodolfo Louis Fernandes | IND | 6,308 | 29.50 | 2,336 | 10.93 |
| 14 | St. Andre | Vishnu Surya Naik Wagh | BJP | 8,818 | 51.24 | Francisco Silveira | INC | 7,599 | 44.16 | 1,219 | 7.08 |
| 15 | Cumbarjua | Pandurang A. Madkaikar | INC | 9,556 | 48.22 | Nirmala P. Sawant | IND | 7,981 | 40.27 | 1,575 | 7.95 |
| 16 | Maem | Anant Shet | BJP | 12,054 | 53.79 | Pravin Zantye | IND | 6,335 | 28.27 | 5,719 | 25.52 |
| 17 | Sanquelim | Pramod Sawant | BJP | 14,255 | 66.02 | Pratap Gauns | INC | 7,337 | 33.98 | 6,918 | 32.04 |
| 18 | Poriem | Pratapsingh Raoji Rane | INC | 13,772 | 55.09 | Vishwajit Krishnarao Rane | BJP | 11,225 | 44.91 | 2,547 | 10.18 |
| 19 | Valpoi | Vishwajit Pratapsingh Rane | INC | 12,412 | 53.66 | Satyavijay Subrai Naik | BJP | 9,473 | 40.96 | 2,939 | 12.70 |
| 20 | Priol | Pandurang Alias Deepak Dhavalikar | MAG | 12,264 | 49.72 | Govind Gaude | IND | 10,164 | 41.20 | 2,100 | 8.52 |
| 21 | Ponda | Lavoo Mamledar | MAG | 12,662 | 54.51 | Ravi Naik | INC | 9,472 | 40.77 | 3,190 | 13.74 |
| 22 | Siroda | Mahadev Narayan Naik | BJP | 12,216 | 53.15 | Subhash Ankush Shirodkar | INC | 9,954 | 43.31 | 2,262 | 9.84 |
| 23 | Marcaim | Ramkrishna Alias Sudin Dhavalikar | MAG | 14,952 | 65.94 | Ritesh Naik | INC | 7,722 | 34.06 | 7,230 | 31.88 |
| 24 | Mormugao | Milind Sagun Naik | BJP | 7,419 | 45.69 | Sankalp Padmanabh Amonkar | INC | 6,506 | 40.07 | 913 | 5.62 |
| 25 | Vasco-da-Gama | Jose Luis Carlos Almeida | BJP | 11,468 | 52.72 | Jose Filepe D'Souza | NCP | 6,978 | 32.08 | 4,490 | 20.64 |
| 26 | Dabolim | Mauvin Heliodoro Godinho | INC | 7,468 | 48.89 | Premanand Nanoskar | MAG | 6,524 | 42.71 | 944 | 6.18 |
| 27 | Cortalim | Matanhy Saldanha | BJP | 7,427 | 36.37 | Nelly Rodrigues | GVP | 5,158 | 25.26 | 2,269 | 11.11 |
| 28 | Nuvem | Mickky Pacheco | GVP | 12,288 | 56.90 | Aleixo Sequeira | INC | 8,092 | 37.47 | 4,196 | 19.43 |
| 29 | Curtorim | Aleixo Reginaldo Lourenco | INC | 11,221 | 57.11 | Domnic Gaonkar | IND | 7,152 | 36.40 | 4,069 | 20.71 |
| 30 | Fatorda | Vijai Sardesai | IND | 10,375 | 48.39 | Damodar (Damu) G. Naik | BJP | 8,436 | 39.35 | 1,939 | 9.04 |
| 31 | Margao | Digambar Kamat | INC | 12,041 | 54.36 | Mahatme Rupesh | BJP | 7,589 | 34.26 | 4,452 | 20.10 |
| 32 | Benaulim | Caetano R. Silva | GVP | 9,695 | 45.95 | Valanka Alemao | INC | 7,694 | 36.47 | 2,001 | 9.48 |
| 33 | Navelim | Avertano Furtado | IND | 10,231 | 54.48 | Churchill Alemao | INC | 8,086 | 43.06 | 2,145 | 11.42 |
| 34 | Cuncolim | Subhash Alias Rajan Kashinath Naik | BJP | 7,738 | 37.31 | Alemao Joaquim | INC | 6,425 | 30.98 | 1,313 | 6.33 |
| 35 | Velim | Benjamin Silva | IND | 13,164 | 59.49 | Filipe Nery Rodrigues | INC | 8,238 | 37.23 | 4,926 | 22.26 |
| 36 | Quepem | Chandrakant Kavlekar | INC | 10,994 | 44.22 | Prakash Shankar Velip | IND | 4,621 | 18.59 | 6,373 | 25.63 |
| 37 | Curchorem | Nilesh Cabral | BJP | 14,299 | 72.20 | Shyam Gopinath Satardekar | INC | 5,507 | 27.80 | 8,792 | 44.40 |
| 38 | Sanvordem | Ganesh Chandru Gaonkar | BJP | 10,585 | 45.34 | Arjun Anil Salgaocar | IND | 8,294 | 35.53 | 2,291 | 9.81 |
| 39 | Sanguem | Subhash Phal Desai | BJP | 7,454 | 34.67 | Alemao Yuri | NCP | 6,971 | 32.42 | 483 | 2.25 |
| 40 | Canacona | Ramesh Bombo Tawadkar | BJP | 14,328 | 53.89 | Isidore Aleixinho Fernandes | INC | 11,624 | 43.72 | 2,704 | 10.17 |

=== By-election ===
Shortly after the election, the Cortalim seat was opened for a by-election following the death of the incumbent, Matanhy Saldanha, as a result of a heart attack. His wife, Alina Saldanha, was originally scheduled to run against Raymond D’Sa of the INC and independent candidate Ramakant Borkar, though the latter two soon withdrew from the race and she was elected unopposed on 25 May. She was given her husband's ministerial portfolio as forest minister. She immediately said that she would not allow mining on forest land.

== Analysis ==
The Daily Pioneer called this election "the first time that the BJP has stamped its success in so many of those constituencies that have a significant population of the minority community."

== Bypolls (2012–2017) ==
| S.No | Date | Constituency | MLA before election | Party before election | Elected MLA | Party after election |
|---|---|---|---|---|---|---|
| 27 | 21 May 2012 | Cortalim | José Matanhy de Saldanha | Bharatiya Janata Party | Alina Saldanha | Bharatiya Janata Party |
| 11 | 13 February 2015 | Panaji | Manohar Parrikar | Bharatiya Janata Party | Sidharth Kuncalienker | Bharatiya Janata Party |
