= Benaulim Assembly constituency =

Legislative Assembly constituency in Goa State, India

Coordinates: 15.25°N 73.94°E

Benaulim
- Constituency No. 32 for the Goa Legislative Assembly

Constituency details
- Country: India
- Region: Western India
- State: Goa
- District: South Goa
- Lok Sabha constituency: South Goa
- Established: 1963
- Total electors: 28,959
- Reservation: None

Member of Legislative Assembly
- 8th Goa Legislative Assembly
- Incumbent Venzy Viegas
- Party: AAP
- Elected year: 2022

Benaulim Assembly constituency is one of the 40 Goa Legislative Assembly constituencies of the state of Goa in southern India. Benaulim is also one of the 20 constituencies falling under South Goa Lok Sabha constituency.

== Members of Legislative Assembly ==
Year	Member	Party
1963	Maurilio Furtado	United Goans Party
1967	Miranda Elu Jose	United Goans Party
1972	Vasudeo Narayan Sarmalkar	United Goans Party
1974 (Note: by-election)	Wilfred de Souza	United Goans Party
1977	Cota Lourence Pedro Santano	Indian National Congress
1980	Monte D'Cruz	Indian National Congress
1984	Monte D'Cruz	Indian National Congress
1989	Churchill Alemao	Indian National Congress
1994	Churchill Alemao	United Goans Democratic Party
1996 (Note: by-election)	Joaquim Alemao	United Goans Democratic Party
1999	Churchill Alemao	Indian National Congress
2002	Francisco Pacheco	United Goans Democratic Party
2007	Francisco Pacheco	Nationalist Congress Party
2012	Caetano Silva	Goa Vikas Party
2017	Churchill Alemao	Nationalist Congress Party
2022	Venzy Viegas	Aam Aadmi Party

== Election results ==
=== 2027 Assembly election ===
2027 Goa Legislative Assembly election: Benaulim
Party	Candidate	Votes	%	±%
INC				
NDA				
NOTA	None of the above			
Majority				
Turnout				
gain from		Swing		

=== Assembly Election 2022 ===
2022 Goa Legislative Assembly election : Benaulim
Party	Candidate	Votes	%	±%
AAP	Venzy Viegas	6,411	30.32%	▲10.70
AITC	Churchill Alemao	5,140	24.31%	New
INC	Antonio Tony Feliciano Dias	4,697	22.21%	▲12.09
RGP	Desmond Fernandes	3,854	18.23%	New
BJP	Damodar Samir Bandodkar	851	4.02%	New
NOTA	None of the Above	161	0.76%	▼0.12
Margin of victory		1,271	6.01%	▼18.34
Turnout		21,145	72.35%	▼1.50
Registered electors		28,959		▲1.24
AAP gain from NCP		Swing	▼13.66	

=== Assembly Election 2017 ===
2017 Goa Legislative Assembly election : Benaulim
Party	Candidate	Votes	%	±%
NCP	Churchill Alemao	9,373	43.98%	New
AAP	Royla Clarina Fernandes	4,182	19.62%	New
Independent	Caetano Rosario Silva	3,995	18.74%	New
INC	Edwino Barreto	2,157	10.12%	▼26.33
Goa Su-Raj Party	John Fernandes	571	2.68%	New
Goa Vikas Party	Maria Da Luz Arlinda Gomes E Rebelo	492	2.31%	▼43.63
Independent	Judith Aurelia Baptista Almeida Alias Judith Almeida	357	1.67%	New
NOTA	None of the Above	187	0.88%	New
Margin of victory		5,191	24.35%	▲14.87
Turnout		21,314	74.52%	▼0.39
Registered electors		28,603		▲1.52
NCP gain from Goa Vikas Party		Swing	▼1.96	

=== Assembly Election 2012 ===
2012 Goa Legislative Assembly election : Benaulim
Party	Candidate	Votes	%	±%
Goa Vikas Party	Caitu Silva	9,695	45.93%	New
INC	Valanka Alemao	7,694	36.45%	New
Independent	Humberto Gomes	1,775	8.41%	New
AITC	John Fernandes	1,277	6.05%	New
Independent	Ashley Francis Dias	289	1.37%	New
Independent	P. Xavier George	245	1.16%	New
Margin of victory		2,001	9.48%	▲4.66
Turnout		21,106	74.88%	▲8.06
Registered electors		28,176		▲20.14
Goa Vikas Party gain from NCP		Swing	▼5.68	

=== Assembly Election 2007 ===
2007 Goa Legislative Assembly election : Benaulim
Party	Candidate	Votes	%	±%
NCP	Mickky Pacheco	8,092	51.61%	▼4.79
Save Goa Front	John Fernandes	7,336	46.79%	New
Independent	Theodore Fernandes	246	1.57%	New
Margin of victory		756	4.82%	▼14.52
Turnout		15,678	66.83%	▲2.50
Registered electors		23,453		▲1.51
NCP hold		Swing		

=== Assembly By-election 2005 ===
2005 Goa Legislative Assembly by-election : Benaulim
Party	Candidate	Votes	%	±%
NCP	Pacheco Francisco Xavier	8,386	56.41%	New
UGDP	Monte Cruz Francisco Piedade	5,510	37.06%	▼14.45
Independent	Dr. Fernandes Piedade	525	3.53%	New
BJP	Premanand A.Lotlikar	446	3.00%	▲0.38
Margin of victory		2,876	19.34%	▲12.37
Turnout		14,867	64.35%	▼3.22
Registered electors		23,104		▲3.73
NCP gain from UGDP		Swing	▲4.90	

=== Assembly Election 2002 ===
2002 Goa Legislative Assembly election : Benaulim
Party	Candidate	Votes	%	±%
UGDP	Mickky Pacheco	7,752	51.51%	New
INC	Churchill Alemao	6,703	44.54%	▼22.23
BJP	Laxmi Gonsalves	394	2.62%	New
Independent	Fernandes Glen Mariano	131	0.87%	New
Margin of victory		1,049	6.97%	▼30.48
Turnout		15,050	67.56%	▲6.55
Registered electors		22,274		▲5.21
UGDP gain from INC		Swing	▼15.26	

=== Assembly Election 1999 ===
1999 Goa Legislative Assembly election : Benaulim
Party	Candidate	Votes	%	±%
INC	Churchill Alemao	8,625	66.77%	New
UGDP	Radharao Socrates Gracias	3,788	29.33%	
BJP	Mahatme Roopesh Rajanikant	298	2.31%	New
Independent	Fernandes Agnelo	124	0.96%	New
Margin of victory		4,837	37.45%	▲29.00
Turnout		12,917	60.99%	▼4.17
Registered electors		21,170		▲2.58
INC gain from UGDP		Swing	▲13.95	

=== Assembly By-election 1996 ===
1996 Goa Legislative Assembly by-election : Benaulim
Party	Candidate	Votes	%	±%
UGDP	Joaquim Alemao	7,107	52.82%	▼9.39
INC	Agnelo Fernandes	5,970	44.37%	New
BJP	Silveira Tiaf Caitano	217	1.61%	New
Margin of victory		1,137	8.45%	▼20.69
Turnout		13,454	64.42%	▼7.66
Registered electors		20,638		▲8.94
UGDP hold		Swing		

=== Assembly Election 1994 ===
1994 Goa Legislative Assembly election : Benaulim
Party	Candidate	Votes	%	±%
UGDP	Churchill Alemao	8,587	62.22%	New
INC	Monte Cruz	4,565	33.07%	
Independent	Jack Rosario Rodrigues	187	1.35%	New
Independent	Ratos Sebastiao Joaquim	104	0.77%	New
BSP	Furtado Antonio Damiao	97	0.72%	New
Margin of victory		4,022	29.14%	▼12.81
Turnout		13,802	71.62%	▼2.69
Registered electors		18,945		▲8.11
UGDP gain from INC		Swing	▼7.25	

=== Assembly Election 1989 ===
1989 Goa Legislative Assembly election : Benaulim
Party	Candidate	Votes	%	±%
INC	Alimno Churchil Braz	9,196	69.47%	▲14.68
Independent	Pinto Nazario Jose	3,642	27.51%	New
Gomantak Lok Pox	Correia Alphonso Antonio Francisco	163	1.23%	New
Margin of victory		5,554	41.95%	▲28.97
Turnout		13,238	74.50%	▲5.72
Registered electors		17,524		▼7.91
INC hold		Swing	▲14.68	

=== Assembly Election 1984 ===
1984 Goa, Daman and Diu Legislative Assembly election : Benaulim
Party	Candidate	Votes	%	±%
INC	Cruz Francisco Monte Piedade	7,280	54.79%	New
Independent	Churchill Alemao	5,555	41.80%	New
Independent	Rodrigues Francisco Caetan Gilberto	127	0.96%	New
Margin of victory		1,725	12.98%	▼42.44
Turnout		13,288	68.28%	▲9.01
Registered electors		19,030		▲5.44
INC gain from INC(U)		Swing	▼17.51	

=== Assembly Election 1980 ===
1980 Goa, Daman and Diu Legislative Assembly election : Benaulim
Party	Candidate	Votes	%	±%
INC(U)	Cruz Francisco Monte Piedade	7,936	72.30%	New
MGP	Cardozo Raul Joaquim	1,852	16.87%	New
Independent	Silva Eugenio Silvano	277	2.52%	New
JP	Barreto Joao Jeronio	220	2.00%	New
Independent	Cota Jose Lourance Joaquim	197	1.79%	New
JP(S)	Braganza Edward Francisco	188	1.71%	New
Margin of victory		6,084	55.42%	▲44.50
Turnout		10,977	59.26%	▲4.91
Registered electors		18,049		▲2.15
INC(U) gain from INC		Swing	▲29.82	

=== Assembly Election 1977 ===
1977 Goa, Daman and Diu Legislative Assembly election : Benaulim
Party	Candidate	Votes	%	±%
INC	Cota Lourence Pedro Santano	4,196	42.47%	New
JP	Barreto Jaco Jesmina	3,117	31.55%	New
MGP	Gardoso Raul Joaquim	2,466	24.96%	New
Margin of victory		1,079	10.92%	▼44.06
Turnout		9,879	55.35%	▼5.46
Registered electors		17,669		▲24.01
INC gain from UGP		Swing	▼33.05	

=== Assembly Election 1972 ===
1972 Goa, Daman and Diu Legislative Assembly election : Benaulim
Party	Candidate	Votes	%	±%
UGP	Vasudeo Narayan Sarmalkar	6,604	75.53%	▲74.8
Independent	Cardoso Felicio	1,796	20.54%	New
Independent	Miranda Elu Jose	126	1.44%	New
Margin of victory		4,808	54.99%	▼6.44
Turnout		8,744	60.30%	▼2.79
Registered electors		14,248		▲1.73
UGP hold		Swing	▲2.88	

=== Assembly Election 1967 ===
1967 Goa, Daman and Diu Legislative Assembly election : Benaulim
Party	Candidate	Votes	%	±%
UGP	M. E. Jose	6,528	72.65%	New
Independent	C. F. Clodomiro	1,008	11.22%	New
United Goans Party (Furtado Group)	L. Leitao	964	10.73%	New
Independent	S. Bhandari	121	1.35%	New
Independent	C. J. F. Tiago	105	1.17%	New
Independent	M. F. Antonio	33	0.37%	New
Margin of victory		5,520	61.43%	
Turnout		8,986	62.54%	
Registered electors		14,006		
UGP win (new seat)				

== See also ==
- List of constituencies of the Goa Legislative Assembly
- South Goa district
