= Venzy Viegas =

Indian politician (born 1977)

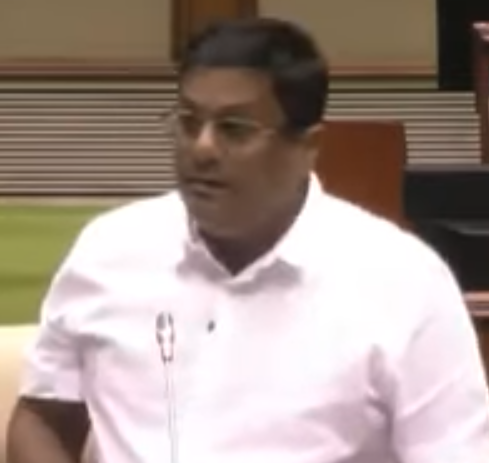
- Viegas in 2024

Member of the Goa Legislative Assembly
- Incumbent
- Assumed office 10 March 2022
- Preceded by: Churchill Alemao
- Constituency: Benaulim

AAP Working President
- Incumbent
- Assumed office 24 May 2022

Personal details
- Born: 9 August 1977 (age 49) Goa, India
- Party: Aam Aadmi Party
- Occupation: Politician

Venzy Viegas (born 9 August 1977) is an Indian politician and former merchant navy officer who serves as a member of the Goa Legislative Assembly, representing the Benaulim Assembly constituency. A member of the Aam Aadmi Party (AAP), he was elected as the MLA from Benaulim in the 2022 Goa Legislative Assembly election. Viegas was appointed the legislative party leader of AAP in Goa Assembly in March 2022.

== Education ==
Viegas graduated with the Highest Nautical Diploma in Nautical Science from South Tyneside College, South Shields, United Kingdom in 2011.

== Career ==
Veigas is a merchant navy mariner with 17 years of sailing experience in tanker vessels.

In 2022 he defeated Churchill Alemao (former Chief Minister of Goa), and won by a margin of 1,271 votes in the Benaulim Assembly constituency. Viegas was also appointed the Working President for AAP in May 2022.

On September 20, 2026, he announced Rs.1 lakh from his MLA fund for every Benaulim based football club registered with the Goa Football Association.

== Electoral history ==
=== 2022 Assembly Election, Benaulim ===
2022 Goa Legislative Assembly election : Benaulim
| Party | Candidate | Votes | % | ±% |
|---|---|---|---|---|
| AAP | Venzy Viegas | 6,411 | 30.32% | ▲10.70 |
| AITC | Churchill Alemao | 5,140 | 24.31% | New |
| INC | Antonio Tony Feliciano Dias | 4,697 | 22.21% | ▲12.09 |
| RGP | Desmond Fernandes | 3,854 | 18.23% | New |
| BJP | Damodar Samir Bandodkar | 851 | 4.02% | New |
| NOTA | None of the Above | 161 | 0.76% | ▼0.12 |
| Margin of victory | | 1,271 | 6.01% | ▼18.34 |
| Turnout | | 21,145 | 72.35% | ▼1.50 |
| Registered electors | | 28,959 | | ▲1.24 |
| AAP gain from NCP | | Swing | ▼13.66 | |

State Legislative Assembly
| Preceded by Churchill Alemao | Member of the Goa Legislative Assembly from Benaulim Assembly constituency 2022 – present | Incumbent |
Aam Aadmi Party political offices
| Preceded by Post established | Vice president of AAP Goa; Jan 2022 – present | Incumbent |
