= Jagat Majhi =

Indian politician

Member of the Jharkhand Legislative Assembly

Jagat Majhi (born 1987) is an Indian politician from Jharkhand. He is an MLA from Manoharpur Assembly constituency, which is reserved for Scheduled Tribe community, in West Singhbhum District. He won the 2024 Jharkhand Legislative Assembly election, representing the Jharkhand Mukti Morcha.

== Early life and education ==
Majhi is from Chakardharpur, West Singhbhum District, Jharkhand. He is the son of late Devendra Majhi, a leader of Singhbhum's Jungle Andolan. His mother Joba Majhi is a five time MLA and an MP from Singhbhum Lok Sabha constituency. He completed his B.Com. in 2008 at Symbiosis College of arts and Commerce.

== Career ==
Majhi won from Manoharpur Assembly constituency representing Jharkhand Mukti Morcha in the 2024 Jharkhand Legislative Assembly election. He polled 73,034 votes and defeated his nearest rival, Dinesh Chandra Boipai of All Jharkhand Students Union party, by a margin of 31,956 votes.
