= Joba Majhi =

Indian politician

Member of Parliament, Lok Sabha
- Incumbent
- Assumed office 4 June 2024
- Preceded by: Geeta Koda
- Constituency: Singhbhum

Minister of Women and Child Development Government of Jharkhand
- In office 29 December 2019 – 2 February 2024
- Preceded by: Louis Marandi

Member of Jharkhand Legislative Assembly
- In office 23 December 2014 – 23 November 2024
- Preceded by: Gurucharan Nayak
- Succeeded by: Jagat Majhi
- Constituency: Manoharpur
- In office 1995–2009
- Preceded by: Krishna charan Munda
- Succeeded by: Gurucharan Nayak
- Constituency: Manoharpur

Personal details
- Born: 24 May 1960 (age 66) Chakradharpur, West Singhbhum
- Party: Jharkhand Mukti Morcha
- Other political affiliations: United Goans Democratic Party; Jharkhand People's Party
- Spouse: Late Devendra Majhi
- Occupation: Agriculture, Gardening & Social Worker

Joba Majhi (Hindi pronunciation: [d͡ʒoːbaː maːd͡ʒʱiː]) is an Indian politician from Jharkhand. She is a 5-time MLA and was the Minister of Social Welfare, Women and Child Development and Tourism from 2019 to 2024 in the Hemant Soren government. She won the 2024 Indian general election in Jharkhand from Singhbhum Lok Sabha constituency.

== Early life and education ==
Majhi was the wife of late Devendra Majhi, a leader of Singhbhum's Jungle Andolan in Saranda, Porahat and Kolhan forest areas. She studied till Class 10 and is a farmer and social worker.

== Career ==
She was elected to the Jharkhand Legislative Assembly from Manoharpur Assembly constituency in 2014 as a member of the Jharkhand Mukti Morcha.

She was an independent before joining JMM and has been a minister in the Babulal Marandi cabinet, in the First Arjun Munda cabinet, in the Shibu Soren cabinet and also in the Rabri Devi cabinet before the formation of Jharkhand.

She won the 2019 Jharkhand Legislative Assembly election from Manoharpur Assembly constituency reserved for ST community in West Singhbhum district. She polled 50,945 votes and defeated her nearest rival, Gurucharan Nayak of Bharatiya Janata Party, by a margin of 16,019 votes.

She won the Singhbhum Lok Sabha constituency in the 2024 Indian general election in Jharkhand. She polled 520,164 votes and defeated her nearest rival, Geeta Koda of Bharatiya Janata Party by a margin of 168,402 votes.
