= Wilfred D'sa =

Indian politician (born 1967)

Member of Goa Legislative Assembly
- In office 2017–2022
- Preceded by: Mickky Pacheco
- Constituency: Nuvem

Personal details
- Born: Wilfred Nazareth Menino D'sa; 12 October 1967 (age 59) Majorda, Goa, India
- Party: Independent
- Other political affiliations: Bharatiya Janata Party; Indian National Congress (till 2019)
- Education: 8th Pass
- Profession: Real estate developer

Wilfred Nazareth Menino D'sa (born 12 October 1967), also known as Babashan, is an Indian politician and real estate developer who was elected to the Goa Legislative Assembly from Nuvem in the 2017 Goa Legislative Assembly election as a member of the Indian National Congress. He was one of the ten members of Indian National Congress who joined Bharatiya Janata Party in July 2019. He is currently an independent politician.
