= Maem =

Village in Goa, India

Coordinates: 15.574°N 73.920°E

Maem is a village located in the North Goa district in the state of Goa, India. In 2001, the population was 7544 of which 3799 were male and 3745 were female.

== Government and politics ==
Maem is part of Maem (Goa Assembly constituency) and North Goa (Lok Sabha constituency).
