= Nuvem =

- Town
- Location of Nuvem in Goa Nuvem (India)
- Coordinates: 15°18′32″N 73°56′46″E
- Country: India
- State: Goa
- District: South Goa
- Sub-district: Salcete

Population (2011)
  - Total: 9 288
- Time zone: UTC+5:30 (IST)
- Postcode: 403713
- Area code: 0832
- Website: goa.gov.in

Nuvem (formerly a village on the outskirts of Margao) is a town that is part of the Salcete sub-district of South Goa district, Goa, India.

== Geography ==
Nuvem is situated along the National Highway 17. Neighboring villages include Verna, Majorda, and Seraulim. It is located 5 kilometers from its district headquarters Margão, 24 kilometers from Vasco da Gama, and 29 kilometers from the state capital, Panjim.

== Demographics ==
Nuvem is a census town in the district of South Goa, Goa. It has a population of 9,288, of which 4,450 are males and 4,838 are females, as per a report released by the Census India 2011.

== Education ==
Nuvem is home to two educational institutions: Carmel College for Women and IAM Institute of Hotel Management. In its vicinity is the Verna complex of Agnel institutions, which includes an engineering college.

== Government and politics ==
Nuvem is part of Nuvem (Goa Assembly constituency) and South Goa (Lok Sabha constituency).

== Culture ==
Football is the most popular sport in Nuvem. Konkani tiatrs are also very popular. Nuvem had a go-kart track located on the hill top. A new sporting activity called MILSIM GOA, a variation of paintball, has just started in Gounlloy, a ward in Nuvem. It also has a water park called Froggyland.

Nuvem has a church known as Jezu Marie Juze (Jesus, Mary and Joseph), formerly known as Igreja Mãe dos Pobres (Mother of the Poor Church). The Mãe dos Pobres feast is celebrated by the villagers on the first Sunday of November every year.
