= Save Goa Front =

Defunct political party in India

- Abbreviation: SGF
- Leader: Churchill Alemao
- Founder: Churchill Alemao
- Founded: March 2007
- Dissolved: January 2008
- Split from: Indian National Congress
- Merged into: Indian National Congress
- ECI status: dissolved party
- Alliance: United Progressive Alliance (2007-2008)

Election symbol
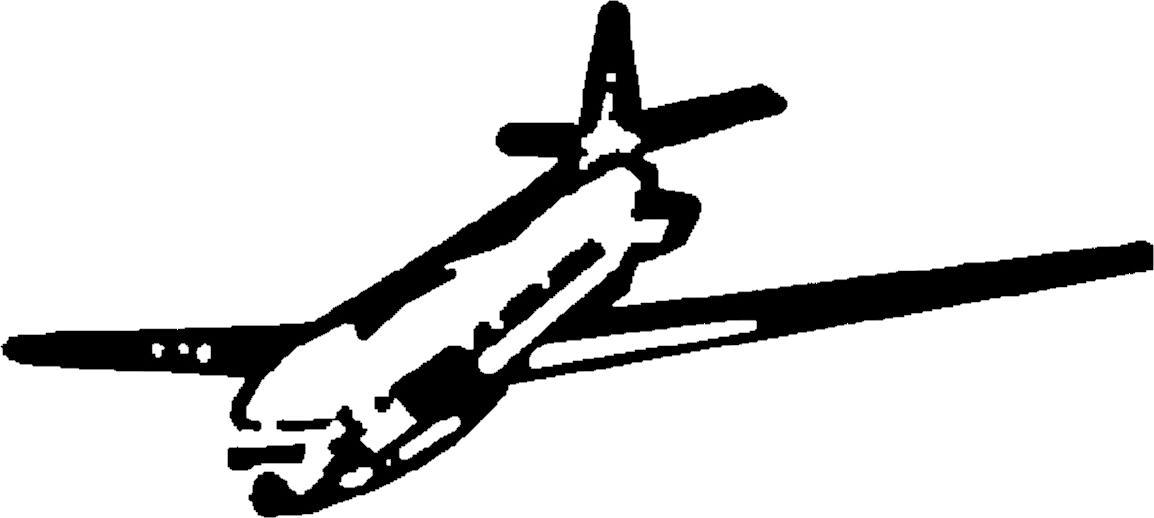

Save Goa Front was a regional political party in the Indian state of Goa. It was founded by Churchill Alemao. The party formed when Churchill Alemao had a disagreement with the Congress Party, ahead of the 2007 Goa election.

== History ==
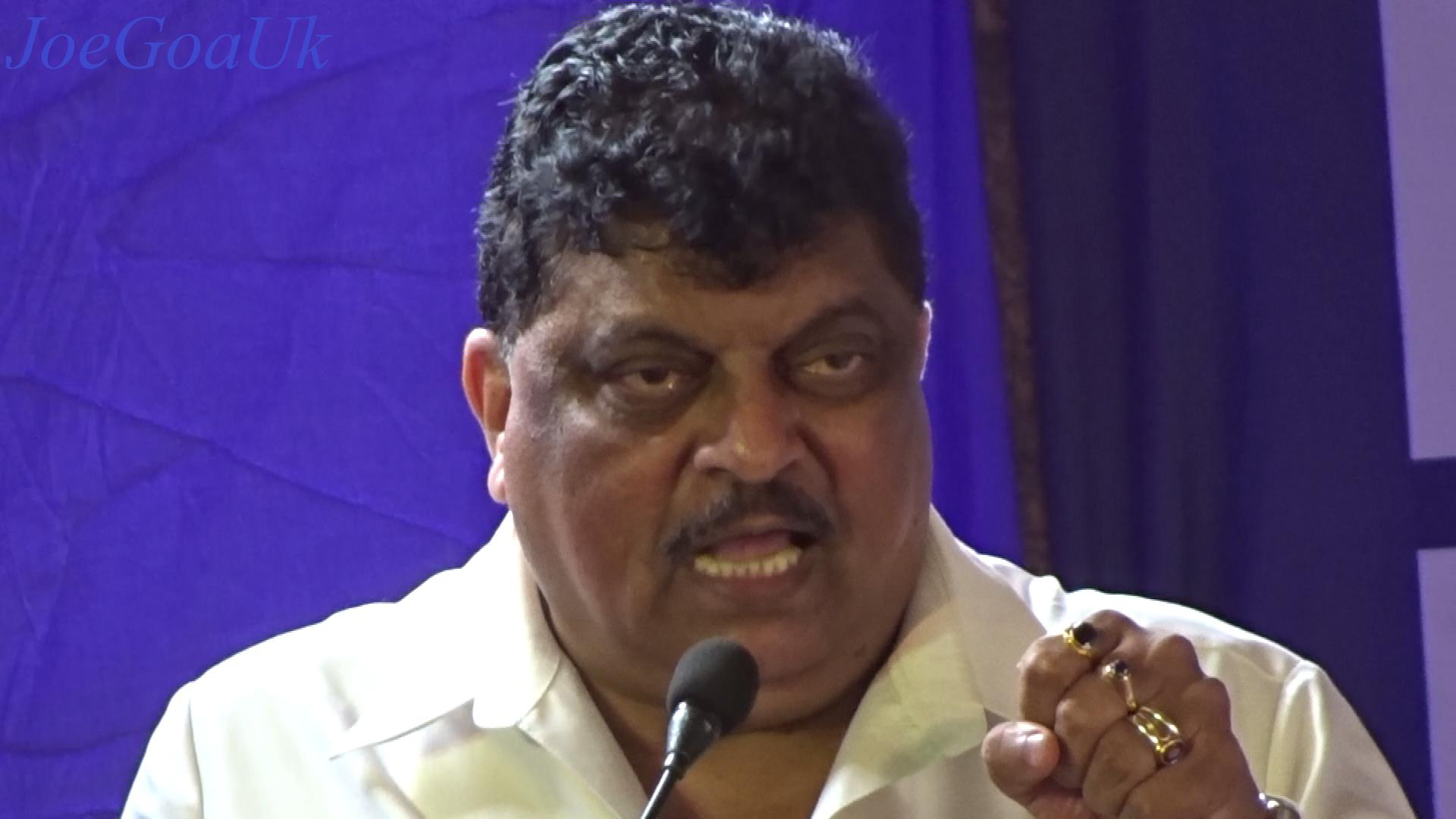
Churchill Alemao, Founder and Leader of the party (2007-2008).

In March 2007, Alemao quit Congress and formed a regional party. In the 2007 Goa Legislative Assembly election the party contested 17 seats and won 2, including his seat and Aleixo Lourenco's. Afterwards, the party merged with Indian National Congress and Nationalist Congress Party, and Digambar Kamat became chief minister of Goa.

In January 2008, Alemao merged the Save Goa Front with Congress. He continued as an MLA and Minister in Goa during this period. In March 2008, the party merged with Indian National Congress.

== Electoral history ==
=== Goa Vidhan Sabha (Lower House) ===
Term	Assembly Election	Seats contested	Seats won	Popular votes	% of votes
5th Legislative assembly	2007	17	2	55,471	7.8%

== List of Goa Assembly Members ==
No.	Name	Date of Appointment	Date of Retirement	Constituency
1	Churchill Braz Alemao	2007	2012	Navelim
2	Aleixo Reginaldo Lourenco	2007	2012	Curtorim

== See also ==
- List of political parties in India
- List of Indian National Congress breakaway parties
- List of United Progressive Alliance members
