= List of United Progressive Alliance members =

The United Progressive Alliance (UPA) was a centre-left alliance of political parties in India formed after the 2004 general election. In India it was considered to be rival of NDA government in formation of government at Centre. The most influential party of the UPA alliance was the Indian National Congress. Sonia Gandhi was chairperson of the UPA. It formed a government with support from some other parties in 2004.

== Former members (members till dissolution) ==
Party		Base state
1	Indian National Congress	National Party
2	Dravida Munnetra Kazhagam	Tamil Nadu, Puducherry
4	Shiv Sena (UBT)	Maharashtra, Dadra and Nagar Haveli
5	Nationalist Congress Party	Maharashtra
6	Rashtriya Janata Dal	Bihar, Jharkhand, Kerala
7	Indian Union Muslim League	Kerala
8	Jammu and Kashmir National Conference	Jammu and Kashmir
9	Jharkhand Mukti Morcha	Jharkhand
10	Marumalarchi Dravida Munnetra Kazhagam	Tamil Nadu
11	Revolutionary Socialist Party (India)	Kerala
12	Viduthalai Chiruthaigal Katchi	Tamil Nadu
13	Assam Jatiya Parishad	Assam
14	Goa Forward Party	Goa
15	Kerala Congress	Kerala
16	Revolutionary Marxist Party of India	Kerala
17	Anchalik Gana Morcha	Assam
18	Kerala Congress (Jacob)	Kerala
19	Nationalist Congress Kerala	Kerala
20	Peasants and Workers Party of India	Maharashtra
20	Independent	None
	Total	India

== Members left before dissolution ==
Party	Base State	Withdrawal Date	Reason for Withdrawal
TRS	Telangana	2006	Differences over proposed statehood for Telangana
MDMK	Tamil Nadu	2007	Allied with All India Anna Dravida Munnetra Kazhagam led Front
BSP	National Party	2008	Congress opposed the UP government where the BSP was the ruling party
JKPDP	Jammu and Kashmir	2009	Congress decided to support National Conference Government in Jammu and Kashmir
PMK	Tamil Nadu	2009	PMK declared that it would join the AIADMK led front
AIMIM	Telangana	2012	Accused Congress led State Government of Communalism
AITC	West Bengal	2012	TMC's demands on rollbacks and reforms not met, including the governments decision to allow FDI in retail
JVM(P)	Jharkhand	2012	Opposition to the governments decision to allow FDI in retail
SJ(D)	Kerala	2014	It merged with Janata Dal (United) on 29 December 2014.
JD(U)	Bihar	2017	Joined NDA
JD(S)	Karnataka	2019	Left the alliance after the fall of H. D. Kumaraswamy government.
