= Kiran Kandolkar =

Indian politician

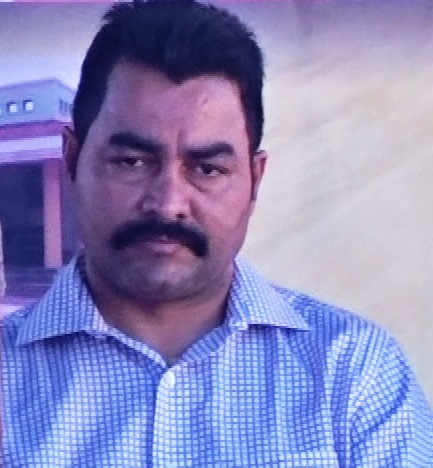
- Kandolkar in 2015

Member of the Goa Legislative Assembly
- In office 2012–2017

Personal details
- Party: Independent
- Other political affiliations: All India Trinamool Congress (2021–2022); Bharatiya Janata Party
- Occupation: Politician

Kiran Kandolkar is an Indian politician. He was a first term member of the Goa Legislative Assembly representing the Tivim constituency. He was the president of All India Trinamool Congress Goa state unit from 19 January 2022, until his resignation after the defeat of the All India Trinamool Congress in the 2022 Goa Legislative Assembly Election.

== Posts ==
Kandolkar was the chairman of the Goa State Horticulture Corporation.

== Committees in the Goa Legislative Assembly ==
He is a member of the following committees in the house

- Member Select Committee on The Goa Land Use
- Member Committee on Privileges
- Member Committee On Government Assurances
- Member Committee On Petitions
- Member Select Committee on The Goa School Education
