= Churchill Alemao =

Indian politician (born 1949)

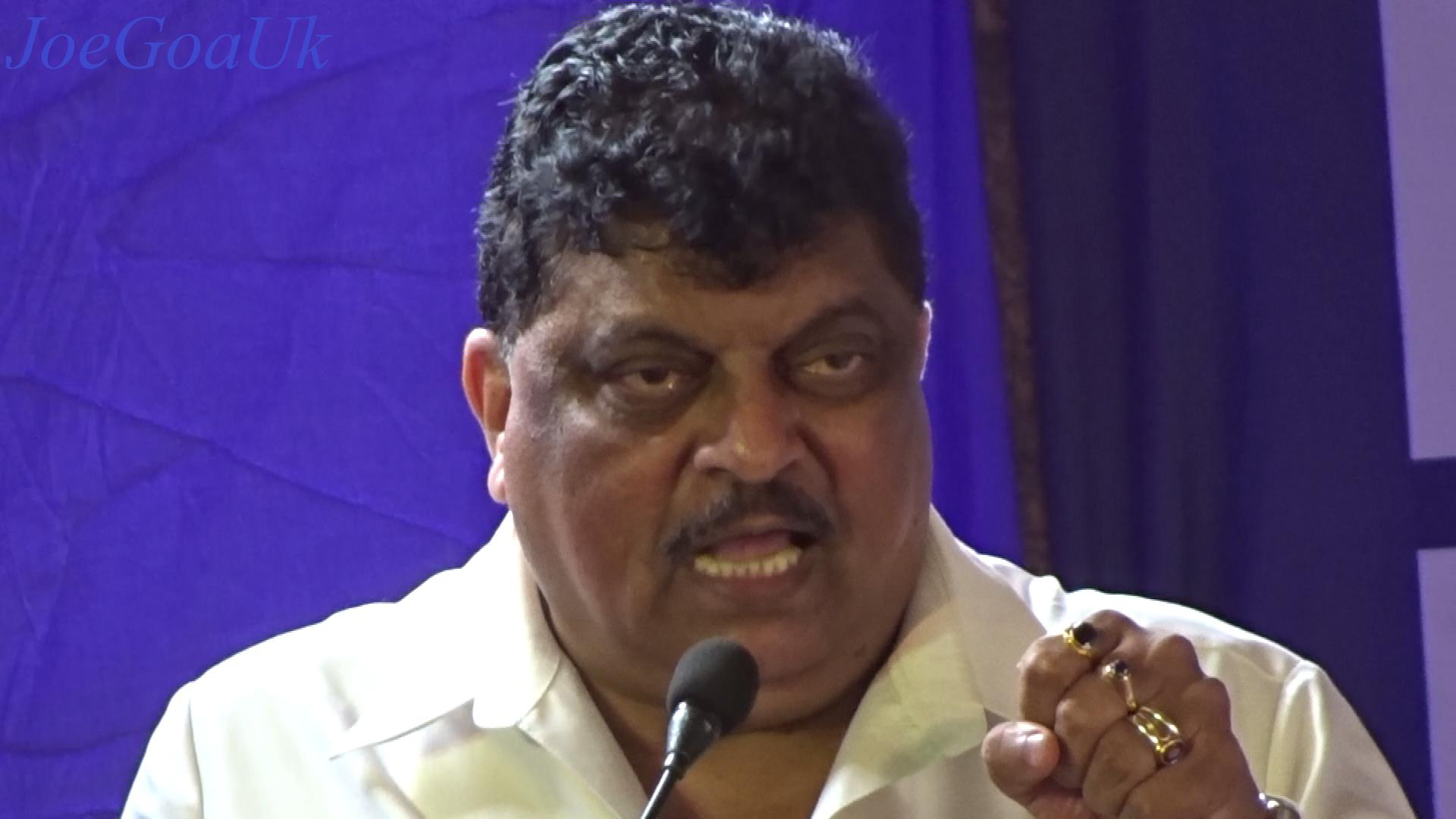
- Alemao in 2018

2nd Chief Minister of Goa
- In office 27 March 1990 – 14 April 1990
- Preceded by: Pratapsingh Rane
- Succeeded by: Luis Proto Barbosa

Member of Parliament Lok Sabha
- In office 2004–2007
- Preceded by: Ramakant Angle
- Succeeded by: Francisco Sardinha
- Constituency: South Goa
- In office 1996–1998
- Preceded by: Eduardo Faleiro
- Succeeded by: Francisco Sardinha
- Constituency: South Goa

Member of the Goa Legislative Assembly
- In office 2017–2022
- Preceded by: Caetano Silva
- Succeeded by: Venzy Viegas
- Constituency: Benaulim
- In office 2007–2012
- Preceded by: Luizinho Faleiro
- Succeeded by: Avertano Furtado
- Constituency: Navelim
- In office 1999–2002
- Preceded by: Joaquim Alemao
- Succeeded by: Francisco Pacheco
- Constituency: Benaulim
- In office 1989–1996
- Preceded by: Francisco Monte Cruz
- Succeeded by: Joaquim Alemao
- Constituency: Benaulim

Personal details
- Born: Churchill Braz Alemao; 16 May 1949 (age 77) Carmona, Goa, Portuguese India
- Party: Trinamool Congress (2014–2016, 2021–present)
- Other political affiliations: United Goans Democratic Party (1980–1983); Indian National Congress (1983–2007, 2008–2014); Save Goa Front (2007–2008); Nationalist Congress Party (2016–2021)
- Spouse: Fatima Fernandes Alemao (m. 1974)
- Children: 6
- Relatives: Joaqium Alemao (brother); Yuri Alemao (nephew)

Churchill Braz Alemao (born 16 May 1949) is an Indian politician who served as the second Chief Minister of Goa from March to April 1990. He is a former two-term Member of Parliament, representing South Goa from 1996 to 1998 and 2004 to 2007. He has also been a member of the Goa Legislative Assembly for four terms between 1989 and 2022, representing Benaulim and Navelim constituencies.

== Personal life ==
Churchill Braz Alemao was born on 16 May 1949 to Braz Alemao in Carmona, Goa, Portuguese India. He attended St. Mary’s High School in Varca. Alemao married Fatima Fernandes Alemao on 20 February 1974, together they have one son and five daughters.

== Political career ==
Alemao served as the chief minister of Goa for a brief period in the early 1990s. He later became an MP representing South Goa from 1996 to 1998.

=== Founding United Goans Democratic Party ===
Alemao founded the United Goans Democratic Party as a spinoff of the United Goans Party.

=== Shift to Congress, Chief Ministership and Member of Parliament ===
In the late 1980s, Alemao quit the United Goans Democratic Party and joined the Indian National Congress. He became Chief Minister for a 18 days as part of the Progressive Democratic Front led by Congress. He had to resign due to an internal split in the party. After that Luis Proto Barbosa became chief minister. Later, Alemao became an MP as Congress leader.

=== Save Goa Front ===
In March 2007, Alemao quit Congress and formed a regional party, the Save Goa Front. The party contested 17 seats and won 2, including his seat and Aleixo Lourenco's. After the election, no party won a majority and the Save Goa Front joined the Congress-led alliance to form a government.

=== Return to Congress ===
In January 2008, Alemao merged the Save Goa Front with Congress. He continued as an MLA and Minister in Goa during this period.

=== March 2012 elections ===
In the March 2012 elections to the Legislative Assembly of Goa, Alemao lost to independent candidate Avertano Furtado by a margin of over 2000 votes. His brother Joaqium Alemao, who was then Minister in the Government of Goa, also lost as he could not retain his Cuncolim constituency. Churchill Alemao's daughter Valanka and Joaquim's son Yuri also lost the 2012 elections. All four candidates from the Alemao family suffered defeat. Churchill Alemao later blamed the then Chief Minister of Goa, Digambar Kamat and the Electronic Voting Machines for his defeat.

=== Entry into the Trinamool Congress ===
In 2014, after his daughter Valanka Alemao was denied candidature by the Indian National Congress party in the elections to the 16th Lok Sabha from the South Goa, Alemao resigned from the Indian National Congress and announced that he would contest the polls as an independent candidate.

Two days later, Alemao joined the Trinamool Congress and was formally inducted in the party by Madan Mitra, a Minister of State in the Government of West Bengal. He contested the elections to the 16th Lok Sabha from the South Goa (Lok Sabha constituency) as a candidate of the All India Trinamool Congress and was defeated by Narendra Keshav Sawaikar of the Bharatiya Janata Party. Alemao polled 11,941 votes in these elections.

=== Joining Nationalist Congress Party ===
On 17 October 2016 Alemao joined the Nationalist Congress Party (NCP) and declared his intent to contest the election on the NCP ticket. He won the Benaulim seat in 2017 Goa Legislative Assembly election.

=== Return to TMC ===
Alemao again joined TMC on 13 December 2021.

== Other ventures ==
In March 2015, Alemao made his debut as a Konkani singer with the audio album "Radio Buyao," which was produced and composed by Sidhanath Buyão. He performed the track "Good Morning, Thank You," also composed by Buyão. By that time, Alemao had appeared in three tiatrs: Dharun Kalliz (Merciless Heart), presented at Wembley Hall in London, followed by Bhat ani Vatt (Fields and Road) and Ticket. Additionally, he was working on his first tiatr as a playwright, titled Ami Voitanv, Tumi Ye-ai (We Are Going, You Follow).

=== Football club ===
The football team Churchill Brothers, which competes in I-League, is owned by Alemao's family. His daughter Valanka Alemao is the CEO of the club.
