= Nuvem Assembly constituency =

Legislative Assembly constituency in Goa State, India

Coordinates: 15.32°N 73.95°E

Nuvem
- Constituency No. 28 for the Goa Legislative Assembly

Constituency details
- Country: India
- Region: Western India
- State: Goa
- District: South Goa
- Lok Sabha constituency: South Goa
- Established: 2008
- Total electors: 28,427
- Reservation: None

Member of Legislative Assembly
- 8th Goa Legislative Assembly
- Incumbent Aleixo Sequeira
- Party: Bharatiya Janata Party

Nuvem Assembly constituency is one of the 40 Goa Legislative Assembly constituencies of the state of Goa in southern India. Nuvem is also one of the 20 constituencies falling under South Goa Lok Sabha constituency.

== Members of Legislative Assembly ==
Year	Member	Party
2012	Francisco Pacheco	Goa Vikas Party
2017	Wilfred D'sa	Indian National Congress
2022	Aleixo Sequeira (Note: Elected to Indian National Congress. Switched to BJP in 2022)	Indian National Congress

== Election results ==
=== 2027 Assembly election ===
2027 Goa Legislative Assembly election: Nuvem
Party	Candidate	Votes	%	±%
INC				
NDA				
NOTA	None of the above			
Majority				
Turnout				
gain from		Swing		

=== Assembly Election 2022 ===
2022 Goa Legislative Assembly election : Nuvem
Party	Candidate	Votes	%	±%
INC	Aleixo Sequeira	8,745	40.06	▼6.41
RGP	Arvind D'Costa	4,348	19.92	New
IND	Wilfred D'Sa	2,961	13.56	New
NCP	Pacheco Francisco Xavier	2,073	9.50	▼3.93
AITC	Jose R Cabral (Raju)	1,718	7.87	New
AAP	Dr. Mariano Godinho	1,222	5.60	▼10.20
BJP	Datta Borkar	569	2.61	New
NOTA	None of the Above	175	0.80	▼0.32
Margin of victory		4,397	20.14	▼6.25
Turnout		21,829	76.11	▲0.74
Registered electors		28,427		▲0.80
INC hold		Swing	▼6.41	

=== Assembly Election 2017 ===
2017 Goa Legislative Assembly election : Nuvem
Party	Candidate	Votes	%	±%
INC	Wilfred D'sa	9,967	46.47	▲9.03
Goa Su-Raj Party	Francisco Pacheco	4,307	20.08	New
AAP	Mariano Godinho	3,389	15.80	New
NCP	Vincent Rodrigues	2,880	13.43	New
Independent	Dinesh Bandodkar	664	3.10	New
NOTA	None of the Above	240	1.12	New
Margin of victory		5,660	26.39	▲6.98
Turnout		21,447	76.05	▼2.37
Registered electors		28,200		▲2.33
INC gain from Goa Vikas Party		Swing	▼10.38	

=== Assembly Election 2012 ===
2012 Goa Legislative Assembly election : Nuvem
Party	Candidate	Votes	%	±%
Goa Vikas Party	Francisco Pacheco	12,288	56.86	New
INC	Aleixo Sequeira	8,092	37.44	New
Independent	Abdul Aziz Hassansha Sayed	482	2.23	New
Independent	Marcos Menino D'Souza	279	1.29	New
MGP	Prabhakar Rupo Gaude	250	1.16	New
Independent	Peter Francisco Dourado	206	0.95	New
Margin of victory		4,196	19.42	
Turnout		21,612	78.37	
Registered electors		27,557		
Goa Vikas Party win (new seat)				

== See also ==
- List of constituencies of the Goa Legislative Assembly
- South Goa district
