= Goa Vikas Party =

- Abbreviation: GVP
- Leader: Francisco Pacheco
- President: Viola Pacheco
- Founder: Sitaram Bandodkar
- Headquarters: Porvorim, Goa
- ECI status: Registered Unrecognised Party
- Alliance: United Progressive Alliance

The Goa Vikas Party (GVP) is a regional political party from Goa, India, was led by Francisco Pacheco. The GVP was founded by late Sitaram Bandodkar, and the current president is Francisco Pacheco's partner Viola Pacheco. It was revived by Pacheco, who left the Nationalist Congress Party and joined the GVP ahead of the 2012 Goa Legislative Assembly election. It is a part of the National Democratic Alliance (NDA) led by the Bharatiya Janata Party (BJP). It is a part of the ruling coalition in Goa, the other members being the BJP and Maharashtrawadi Gomantak Party. The GVP has two members in the Goa Legislative Assembly: Pacheco from Nuvem but he resigned and Caetano Silva from Benaulim.

Three daughters of Party founder Sitaram Bandodkar lodged a complaint in the Election Commission of India during the takeover of the party by Pacheco, alleging that they were not consulted during the revivification. The GVP contested on nine seats and got 3.5 percent of the total votes in the 2012 Goa elections. In November 2014, Pacheco was inducted as a minister in the state cabinet; the step was seen as a "thank you" to the GVP for its support to the BJP in the 2014 Indian general election. However, Pacheco resigned from the post in April 2015 after getting convicted by the Supreme Court of India for assaulting a government official. Caetano Silva raised his claim for the vacant ministerial berth, and later termed the GVP as a "one-man political organisation", saying that he feels like an "independent member of the GVP".
