= Goa Su-Raj Party =

Flag

Goa Su-Raj Party (GSRP) is a political party in the Indian state of Goa. In the 2002 Goa Legislative Assembly election, GSRP launched eight candidates, who together mustered 1500 votes. The party is known to be active in taking a number of stands on issues affecting the state. It is also active through making its voice heard in cyberspace, and is known to campaign for votes on the grounds that as a "regional" (as contrasted to the national-level parties that dominate Goa's politics, such as the Indian National Congress and the Bharatiya Janata Party) it would be better able to serve the needs of the electorate. It has not been successful in getting its candidates elected though, till August 2006.

Party leaders have explained its name, "Su-Raj", to mean "good governance". It has taken stands against corruption in the region. Its leaders include the Moira-based radio officer-turned-politician Floriano Lobo, Dr Dumo and others.

In early 2012, GSRP formed its youth wing with Jocelyn Pereira appointed as its youth president. Pereira, an active social worker from the island of Divar has been at the fore of many youth activities in the state and actively campaigns for youth of Goa.

On 31 December 2016, former Goa Vikas Party MLA Mickky Pacheco joined the GSRP.
