= Mickky Pacheco =

Indian politician (born 1964)

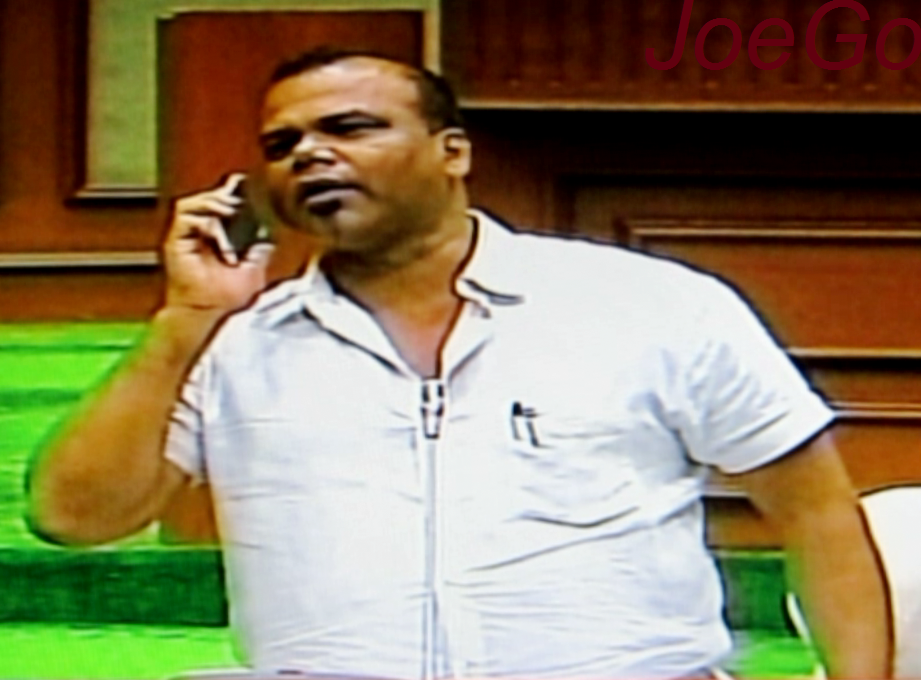
- Pacheco in 2014

Member of Goa Legislative Assembly
- In office 7 March 2012 – 18 March 2017
- Preceded by: constituency established
- Succeeded by: Wilfred D'sa
- Constituency: Nuvem

Minister of Rural Development and Archaeology and Archives, Goa
- In office 8 November 2014 – 4 April 2015

Minister of Tourism, Goa
- In office 3 June 2002 – 14 June 2004
- In office 25 June 2007 – 5 June 2010

Captain of Ports
- In office 3 June 2002 – 14 June 2004
- In office 17 December 2007 – 5 June 2010

Minister of Housing
- In office 25 June 2007 – 5 June 2010

Minister of Agriculture and Animal Husbandry, Goa
- In office 25 June 2005 – 5 June 2007

Minister of Sports and Youth Affairs
- In office 3 June 2002 – 14 June 2004

Member of Goa Legislative Assembly
- In office June 2002 – 30 Dec 2011
- Preceded by: Churchill Alemao
- Succeeded by: Caetano Silva
- Constituency: Benaulim

Personal details
- Born: Francisco Xavier Pacheco; 12 December 1964 (age 61) Benaulim, Goa, India
- Party: Indian National Congress
- Other political affiliations: Goa Su-Raj Party; Goa Vikas Party; Nationalist Congress Party; United Goans Democratic Party (2002–2005); Bharatiya Janata Party
- Spouse: Sara Pacheco (m. 1999; div. 2009); Viola Pacheco
- Domestic partner(s): Nadia Torrado (2006–2010)
- References MLA Profile Previous Election Details

Francisco Xavier "Mickky" Pacheco (born 12 December 1964) is an Indian politician who is a former three-term member of the Goa Legislative Assembly, representing the Nuvem and Benaulim constituencies and former leader of the Indian National Congress. He held portfolios of Rural Development, Archeology and Archives, Tourism, Captain of Ports, Housing, Agriculture, Animal Husbandry, and Sports and Youth Affairs in the state cabinet.

In 2015, Pacheco was convicted of assaulting a government official and sentenced to imprisonment for six months, forcing him to resign from his ministerial post.

== Political career ==
Pacheco won the 2002 Legislative Assembly election as a member of the United Goans Democratic Party. He later split and formed the United Goans Democratic Party (Secular), which merged with the Bharatiya Janata Party in January 2005. He later joined the Nationalist Congress Party (NCP) and won the 2007 election. Prior to the 2012 Legislative Assembly election, he left the NCP and joined the Goa Vikas Party (GVP). Pacheco's wife Viola Pacheco was made the GVP president in 2012 he quit Goa Vikas Party and joined the Goa Su-raj Party; he lost the Nuvem Constituency in the hands of sitting ZP Member of Nuvem Wilfred D'sa.

In 1981, while he was in seventh standard, Pacheco dropped out of school and became a tailor "to support his family". As per his affidavit in the 2012 Legislative Assembly election, he has assets worth ₹5.96 crore (equivalent to ₹11 crore or US$1.2 million in 2023). He was an associate of former Chief Minister of Goa Churchill Alemao, but defeated him in the 2002 election. Several criminal cases are registered against Pacheco; he was also alleged by the United States (US) authorities of his involvement in illegal immigration of Goan youth to the US and money laundering racket.

== Personal life ==
Belonging to a Catholic family, Pacheco claims to be from a "very poor family". He dropped out of school in 1981 when he was in seventh standard, and became a tailor "to support his family". Later he moved to Bahrain and the US. Pacheco says that he is still a fashion designer, and owns a showroom in Paris. Pacheco is a fan of Tupac Shakur and Snoop Dogg, and was a bass guitarist in a local band. Pacheco was the owner of a football club Fransa-Pax FC, which was dissolved in March 2006 as a protest against the All India Football Federation.

== Reception ==
Pacheco has been involved in various controversies, and has ten criminal cases registered against him. In June 2010, he was arrested over his alleged involvement in the suicide of his girlfriend Nadia Torrado. He was forced to resign from his ministerial post in the then Indian National Congress-led government, but was later given a clean chit due to absence of evidence. His estranged wife Sara Pacheco accused him of bigamy under the Protection of Women from Domestic Violence Act, 2005. Other cases against him are road rage, abusing and threatening a traffic police constable in Margao, forgery in property deals, and extortion of ₹3.69 lakh (equivalent to ₹9.3 lakh or US$9,600 in 2023) from a casino in 2009.

Pacheco was probed by the Central Bureau of Investigation when the United States' Bureau of Diplomatic Security alleged his involvement in illegal immigration of Goan youth and a money laundering racket.
