= United Goans Democratic Party =

- Abbreviation: UGDP
- Founder: Churchill Alemao
- Founded: 1983; 42 years ago
- Colours: Christi Green
- ECI Status: Unrecognised Registered Party

Election symbol
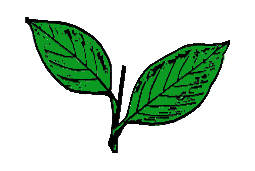

United Goans Democratic Party (UGDP) is one of two formerly dominant political parties in the Indian state of Goa. UGDP has its base amongst the Christian part of the population. It was founded in 1983 by Churchill Alemao.

== UDGP in Jharkhand ==
In Jharkhand, the group of Joba Majhi is formally attached to the party, in order to be able to use the party election symbol 'two leaves'. In 2005 two seats in the Jharkhand assembly were won on the UGDP symbol.

== See also ==
- Shrirang Narvekar
- United Goans Party
