= 2002 Goa Legislative Assembly election =

Election in Indian state

- 30 May 2002

All 40 seats in the Assembly 21 seats needed for a majority
- Turnout: 68.75% (▲3.75%)
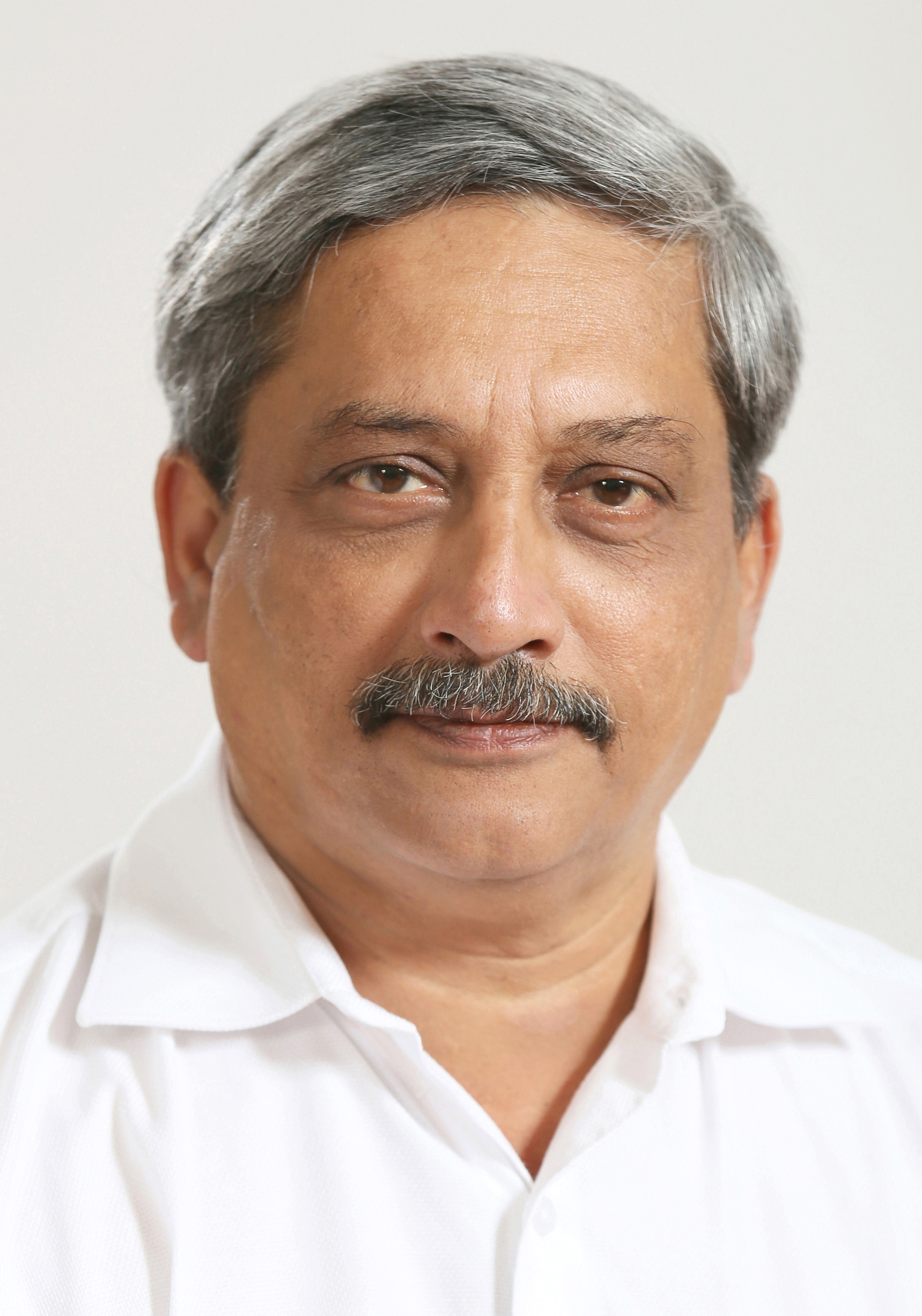

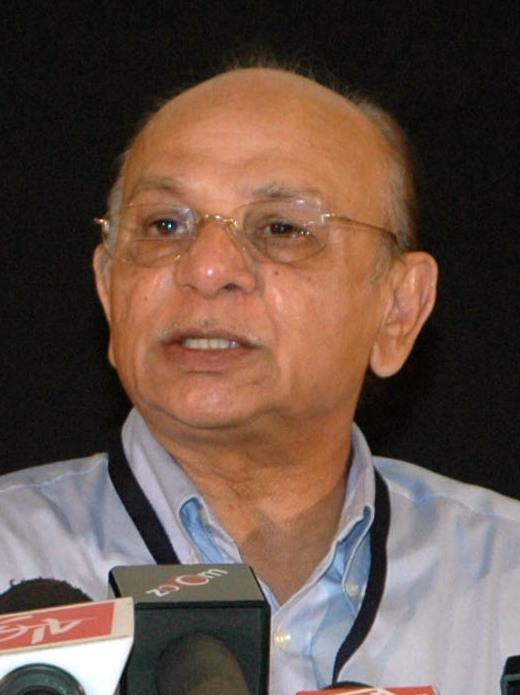
	Majority party	Minority party
Leader	Manohar Parrikar	Pratapsing Rane
Party	BJP	INC
Leader's seat	Panaji	Poriem
Seats won	17	16
Seat change	▲7	▼5
Chief Minister before election
Manohar Parrikar
BJP
Chief Minister after election
Manohar Parrikar
BJP

Elections for the Indian state of Goa took place 2002.

== Parties contested ==
No.	Party	Flag	Symbol	Leader	Seats contested
1.	Indian National Congress			Pratapsingh Rane	40
2.	Bharatiya Janata Party			Manohar Parrikar	39
3.	Maharashtrawadi Gomantak Party			Shashikala Kakodkar	25
4.	Nationalist Congress Party			Sharad Pawar	20
5.	United Goans Democratic Party			Churchill Alemao	10

== Results ==
Rank	Party	Seats Contested	Seats Won
1	Bharatiya Janata Party	39	17
2	Indian National Congress	40	16
4	United Goans Democratic Party	10	3
3	Maharashtrawadi Gomantak	25	2
5	Nationalist Congress Party	20	1
6	Independent	48	1
	Total		40

== Results by constituency ==
The following is the list of winning MLAs in the election.

- Winner, runner-up, voter turnout, and victory margin in every constituency

Assembly Constituency		Turnout	Winner				Runner Up				Margin
#k	Names	%	Candidate	Party	Votes	%	Candidate	Party	Votes	%	Margin
1	Mandrem	78.34%	Laxmikant Parsekar	BJP	5,955	39.05%	Khalap Ramakant	INC	5,047	33.1%	908
2	Bicholim	78.27%	Rajesh Patnekar	BJP	8,960	54.28%	Pandurang Raut	MGP	6,400	38.77%	2,560
3	Panaji	65.82%	Manohar Parrikar	BJP	5,700	55.58%	Silimkhan Ramesh	INC	4,408	42.98%	1,292
4	Quepem	73.09%	Babu Kavlekar	INC	8,913	47.04%	Prakash Velip	BJP	7,058	37.25%	1,855
5	Curchorem	73.31%	Ramrao Dessai	BJP	9,806	53.29%	Domnick Fernandes	INC	8,027	43.62%	1,779
6	Mormugao	54.52%	Vaz Giovanni Karl	INC	4,635	30.91%	Sheikh Hassan Haroon	BJP	4,192	27.95%	443
7	Pernem	77.06%	Deshprabhu Jitendra Raghuraj	INC	6,778	48.27%	Dayanand Raghunath Sopate	BJP	4,449	31.68%	2,329
8	Siolim	70.76%	Dayanand Mandrekar	BJP	7,152	40.49%	Fernandes Francis Gregorio	INC	5,245	29.69%	1,907
9	Calangute	68.52%	Fernandes Agnelo	INC	9,711	53.32%	Suresh Vishwanath Parulekar	BJP	7,641	41.96%	2,070
10	Mapusa	61.93%	Francis D'Souza	BJP	8,378	52.18%	Braganza Armindo Jose	INC	6,271	39.06%	2,107
11	Tivim	70.93%	Sadanand Shet Tanavade	BJP	6,961	38.38%	Nilkanth Ramnath Halarnkar	NCP	6,440	35.51%	521
12	St. Cruz	64.16%	Victoria Fernandes	INC	6,658	40.13%	Anil Roghuvir Hoble	BJP	6,618	39.89%	40
13	St. Andre	70.49%	Francisco Silveira	INC	6,982	44.6%	Pegado Carmo Rafael Andre Jose	NCP	4,196	26.8%	2,786
14	Ponda	67.51%	Ravi Naik	INC	10,745	50.29%	Naik Shripad Yasso	BJP	9,425	44.11%	1,320
15	Siroda	78.28%	Subhash Shirodkar	INC	9,738	51.92%	Prabhu Vishwanath Tukaram	BJP	8,603	45.87%	1,135
16	Cuncolim	62.44%	Joaquim Alemao	INC	6,426	44.48%	Arecio D'Souza	NCP	4,038	27.95%	2,388
17	Curtorim	66.12%	Francisco Sardinha	INC	8,907	56.37%	Lourenco Bruno Santos	Independent	6,056	38.33%	2,851
18	Cumbarjua	67.84%	Pandurang Madkaikar	MGP	6,546	37.58%	Nirmala P. Sawant	INC	5,938	34.09%	608
19	Saligao	70.59%	Wilfred de Souza	NCP	4,263	28.69%	D' Mello Trejano Agricio	INC	3,537	23.8%	726
20	Taleigao	67.07%	Atanasio Monserrate	UGDP	7,237	42.31%	Zuwarkar Somnath Datta	INC	4,976	29.09%	2,261
21	Maem	71.88%	Harish Narayan Prabhu Zantye	INC	6,430	48.22%	Prakash J. Fadte	BJP	4,474	33.55%	1,956
22	Priol	75.16%	Vishwas Satarkar	BJP	8,071	41.62%	Amonkar Shrikant Sagun	INC	6,409	33.05%	1,662
23	Poriem	77.11%	Pratapsingh Rane	INC	9,126	55.78%	Santoba Krishnarao Dessai	BJP	6,557	40.08%	2,569
24	Sanvordem	71.42%	Vinay Dinu Tendulkar	BJP	8,195	48.3%	Salgaocar Anil Vassudeva	Independent	5,084	29.96%	3,111
25	Dargalim	72.93%	Manohar Ajgaonkar	BJP	8,467	74.08%	Dhargalkar Balkrishna Atmaram	INC	2,705	23.67%	5,762
26	Aldona	65.61%	Dayanand Narvekar	INC	9,957	50.73%	Ulhas Asnodkar	BJP	7,944	40.48%	2,013
27	Pale	76.58%	Suresh Amonkar	BJP	8,519	49.84%	Gawas Gurudas Prabhakar	INC	6,965	40.75%	1,554
28	Valpoi	77.04%	Narahari Haldankar	BJP	6,137	49.54%	Venkatesh Desai	INC	5,785	46.7%	352
29	Marcaim	75.89%	Sudin Dhavalikar	MGP	11,587	63.91%	Naik Santosh Mahanandu	BJP	3,737	20.61%	7,850
30	Vasco Da Gama	56.22%	Rajendra Arlekar	BJP	5,605	35.6%	Jose Philip D'Souza	NCP	4,509	28.64%	1,096
31	Cortalim	64.61%	Matanhy Saldanha	UGDP	6,741	37.93%	Godinho Mauvin Heliodoro	INC	5,891	33.15%	850
32	Loutolim	66.75%	Aleixo Sequeira	INC	8,873	62.88%	Gracias Radharao Socrates	UGDP	4,119	29.19%	4,754
33	Benaulim	67.56%	Mickky Pacheco	UGDP	7,752	51.52%	Churchill Alemao	INC	6,703	44.54%	1,049
34	Fatorda	61.04%	Damodar (Damu) G. Naik	BJP	5,695	34.97%	Cardoz Luis Alex Florenci	INC	5,107	31.36%	588
35	Margao	55.05%	Digambar Kamat	BJP	8,525	65.37%	Chodankar Girish Raya	INC	3,781	28.99%	4,744
36	Navelim	58.7%	Luizinho Faleiro	INC	10,245	59.5%	Raikar John Lourence	Independent	5,668	32.92%	4,577
37	Velim	64.02%	Filipe Nery Rodrigues	Independent	8,664	67.35%	D'Silva Marcus Sebastiano	INC	3,148	24.47%	5,516
38	Sanguem	71.32%	Vasudev Gaonkar	BJP	5,747	43.46%	Satyawan Bhadru Dessai	INC	4,910	37.13%	837
39	Canacona	78.62%	Vijay Anandrao Pai Khot	BJP	8,531	58.95%	Sanjay Bandekar	INC	5,648	39.03%	2,883
40	Poinguinim	77.66%	Isidore Fernandes	INC	5,641	49.42%	Ramesh Tawadkar	BJP	3,773	33.05%	1,868

== By Elections ==
No.	Constituency	Winner	Party	Margin	Remark
1	Benaulim	Mickky Pacheco	Nationalist Congress Party		Due to the resignation of Mickky Pacheco
2	Cumbarjua	Pandurang Madkaikar	Indian National Congress		Due to the resignation of Pandurang Madkaikar
3	Margao	Digambar Kamat	Indian National Congress		Due to the resignation of Digambar Kamat
4	Poinguinim	Isidore Fernandes	Bharatiya Janata Party		Due to resignation of Isidore Fernandes
5	Poinguinim	Ramesh Tawadkar	Bharatiya Janata Party		Due to resignation of Isidore Fernandes
6	Taleigao	Babush Monserrate	Indian National Congress		Due to resignation of Babush Monserrate

== Government formation ==
On 3 June 2002, Bharatiya Janata Party formed its first government in Goa under the leadership of Manohar Parrikar which lasted for 2 years and 244 days. Government fell due to Digambar Kamat fallout Bharatiya Janata Party.
