= Dhulo Kuttikar =

Indian politician

Member of Goa Legislative Assembly
- In office 1972–1977
- Preceded by: Shaba Desai
- Succeeded by: Vaikunth Desai
- Constituency: Quepem
- Majority: 3,406 (46.16%)

Personal details
- Born: Dhulo Chimlo Kuttikar Goa, Portuguese India
- Party: Maharashtrawadi Gomantak Party (1972–1977)
- Occupation: Politician

Dhulo Chimlo Kuttikar is an Indian politician who is a former member of the Goa Legislative Assembly representing the Quepem Assembly constituency from 1972 to 1977. He was a member of the Maharashtrawadi Gomantak Party.

== Career ==
Kuttikar contested in the 1972 Goa, Daman and Diu Legislative Assembly election from the Quepem Assembly constituency on the Maharashtrawadi Gomantak Party ticket and emerged victorious by defeating United Goans (Sequiera Group) candidate, Ganba Desai by a margin of 591 votes. He served for five years from 1972 to 1977. This marked his first and last election participation in his political career.

Kuttikar is also said to have dominated the tribal leadership campaign along with Vasu Paik Gaonkar from Canacona, Kashinath Jalmi from Priol, Mama Cardoz from Margao, Antonio Gaonkar from Raia and Prakash Velip from Quepem constituency as members of the Goa Legislative Assembly during the 1980s.
