= Kamat ministry =

- Ministry of Goa
- Date formed: 8 June 2007
- Date dissolved: 9 March 2012

People and organisations
- Head of state: Governor: S. C. Jamir; Shivinder Singh Sidhu; Kateekal Sankaranarayanan
- Head of government: Digambar Kamat
- Member parties: Indian National Congress; Nationalist Congress Party; Maharashtrawadi Gomantak Party; Save Goa Front
- Status in legislature: Coalition

History
- Election: 2007
- Legislature term: 5 years
- Predecessor: Fifth Pratapsingh Rane ministry
- Successor: Second Parrikar ministry

Kamat ministry was the Council of Ministers in Goa headed by Chief Minister Digambar Kamat after the 2007 Goa Legislative Assembly election.

== Council of Ministers ==
S.No	Name	Constituency	Department	Party
1.	Digambar Kamat; Chief Minister	Margao	Finance; Personnel; General Administration Department; Education; Industries and Mines; Information Technology; Legislative Affairs; Judiciary; Art and Culture; Other departments not allocated to any Minister	INC
Cabinet Ministers
2.	Ravi Naik	Ponda	Home	INC
3.	Churchill Alemao	Benaulim	Public Works Department (PWD)	INC
4.	Atanasio Monserrate	Taleigao	Town and Country Planning; Education	INC
5.	Filipe Nery Rodrigues	Velim	Water Resources	INC
6.	Vishwajit Rane	Valpoi	Public Health	IND
7.	Joaquim Alemao	Cuncolim	Urban Development; Factories and Boilers	INC
8.	Jose Philip D'Souza	Vasco da Gama	Revenue; Civil Supplies	NCP
9.	Manohar Ajgaonkar	Dargalim	Panchayati Raj; Sports	INC
10.	Aleixo Sequeira	Nuvem	Power; Environment	INC
11.	Sudin Dhavalikar	Marcaim	Transport	MGP
12.	Nilkanth Halarnkar	Curchorem	Tourism	INC
