= Rane (surname) =

Rane is a surname primarily used by people of the Maratha caste in Maharashtra.

Notable people bearing the name include:

- Datta Rane (fl. 1990s), politician
- Harshvardhan Rane (born 1983), film actor
- Jaisingrao Rane (fl. 1967–1977, politician
- Jayesh Rane (born 1993), footballer
- Kartika Rane, actress, niece of Pratapsingh Rane
- Narayan Rane (born 1952), politician former Chief Minister of Maharashtra
- Nitesh Narayan Rane (born 1982), politician
- Nilesh Narayan Rane (born 1981), politician, son of Narayan Rane
- Pratapsingh Rane (born 1939), politician
- Rama Raghoba Rane (1918–1994), Indian Army officer, recipient of the Param Vir Chakra, India's highest military decoration
- Ranjita Rane (1978/79–2021), cricketer
- Sanyogita Rane (1923–2017), politician, Goa's first woman parliamentarian
- Saraswati Rane (1913–2006), singer
- Shivram Rango Rane (1901–1970), politician
- Vishwajit Rane (born 1973), politician, son of Pratapsingh Rane
- Ajay Rane, Australian physician and philanthropist
- Jimmy Rane (born 1947), American businessman
- Josep Maria Rañé (born 1954), Catalan politician
- Walter Rane (born 1949), American illustrator
- F. William Rane, second head football coach of the West Virginia University Mountaineers (1893–1894)

== See also ==
- Larry and Danny Ranes (1945–2023 and 1943–2022, respectively), American serial killer brothers who committed their crimes completely independent of each other
