= Second Parrikar ministry =

Government of Goa from 2012 to 2014

- Ministry of Goa
- Date formed: 9 March 2012
- Date dissolved: 8 November 2014

People and organisations
- Chief Minister: Manohar Parrikar
- Deputy Chief Minister: Francis D'Souza
- Member parties: Bharatiya Janata Party; Maharashtrawadi Gomantak Party
- Status in legislature: Coalition

History
- Predecessor: Kamat ministry
- Successor: Parsekar ministry

The Second Parrikar ministry was the Council of Ministers in Goa headed by Manohar Parrikar from 9 March 2012 to 8 November 2014. Parrikar, the leader of the Bharatiya Janata Party, was sworn in as the Chief Minister of Goa on 9 March 2012.

The Parrikar-led government was formed by the Bharatiya Janata Party and the Maharashtrawadi Gomantak Party, which had contested the election in alliance.

Parrikar, along with five ministers from the Bharatiya Janata Party and one minister from the Maharashtrawadi Gomantak Party, was inducted into the cabinet.

Shortly after the election, Bharatiya Janata Party MLA from Cortalim and Minister for Forest José Matanhy de Saldanha died of a heart attack. His wife, Alina Saldanha, won the Cortalim by-election and was given his portfolios.

== Council of ministers ==
Name	Office	Portfolio	Took office	Left office
Manohar Parrikar	Chief Minister	—	9 March 2012	8 November 2014
Francis D'Souza	Deputy Chief Minister	—	9 March 2012	8 November 2014
Dayanand Mandrekar	Cabinet Minister	Civil Supplies and Price Control; Water Resources; Archives and Archaeology; Art and Culture	9 March 2012	8 November 2014
Laxmikant Parsekar	Cabinet Minister	Health	9 March 2012	8 November 2014
Sudin Dhavalikar	Cabinet Minister	Public Works Department; Transport; River Navigation; Cooperation	9 March 2012	8 November 2014
Mahadev Naik	Cabinet Minister	—	9 March 2012	8 November 2014
Milind Naik	Cabinet Minister	—	9 March 2012	8 November 2014
Ramesh Tawadkar	Cabinet Minister	—	9 March 2012	8 November 2014
Dilip Parulekar	Cabinet Minister	—	9 March 2012	8 November 2014
Deepak Dhavalikar	Cabinet Minister	—	9 March 2012	8 November 2014
Avertano Furtado	Cabinet Minister	—	9 March 2012	8 November 2014
Alina Saldanha	Cabinet Minister	Tourism; Science; Forest and Environment	21 May 2012	8 November 2014
José Matanhy de Saldanha	Cabinet Minister	Rural Development; Science; Forest and Environment	9 March 2012	21 March 2012 Death

== See also ==
- Government of Goa
- Goa Legislative Assembly
