= Parsekar ministry =

- Ministry of Goa
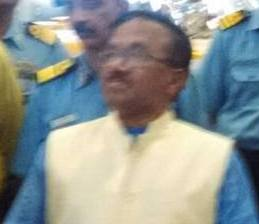
- Laxmikant Parsekar
- Date formed: 8 November 2014
- Date dissolved: 11 March 2017

People and organisations
- Head of state: Governor Mridula Sinha
- Head of government: Laxmikant Parsekar
- Member parties: BJP; MGP; GVP; IND
- Status in legislature: Majority

History
- Election: 2012
- Legislature term: 5 years
- Predecessor: Second Parrikar ministry
- Successor: Third Manohar Parrikar Ministry

Laxmikant Parsekar Ministry was the Council of Ministers in Goa Legislative Assembly headed by Chief Minister Laxmikant Parsekar.

== Council of Ministers ==
Office	Name	Portfolio	Took office	Left office	Party	Reference
Chief Minister	Laxmikant Parsekar		8 November 2014	11 March 2017	BJP	
Deputy Chief Minister	Francis D’Souza	Health, Revenue, Town and Country Planning, Urban Development and Law, Legislative Affairs	8 November 2014	11 March 2017	BJP	
Cabinet Minister	Dayanand Mandrekar	Civil Supplies and Price Control; Water Resources; Archives & Archaeology; Art & Culture	8 November 2014	11 March 2017	BJP	
Cabinet Minister	Ramesh Tawadkar	Agriculture; Animal Husbandry & Veterinary Services; Tribal Welfare; Sports & Youth Affairs	8 November 2014	11 March 2017	BJP	
Cabinet Minister	Mahadev Naik	Minister of Industries, Handicrafts, Textile & Coir; Social Welfare; Co-operation	8 November 2014	11 March 2017	BJP	
Cabinet Minister	Dilip Parulekar	Minister of Tourism; Women & Child Development; Ports; Protocol	8 November 2014	11 March 2017	BJP	
Cabinet Minister	Milind Naik	Power; Non-Conventional Energy; Information Technology; Publicity; Legal Metrology; Official Language	8 November 2014	11 March 2017	BJP	
Cabinet Minister	Alina Saldanha	Minister of Rural Development; Museum; Science & Technology; Environment	8 November 2014	11 March 2017	BJP	
Cabinet Minister	Avertano Furtado	Minister for Labour, Employment and Fisheries	8 November 2014	11 March 2017	BJP	
Cabinet Minister	Rajendra Arlekar	Minister of Forest, Environment and Panchayat (from 1 October 2015)	1 October 2015	11 March 2017	BJP	
Cabinet Minister	Sudin Dhavalikar	Public Works Department, Transport, and River Navigation	8 November 2014	13 December 2016	MGP	
Cabinet Minister	Deepak Dhavalikar	Public Works Department	8 November 2014	13 December 2016	MGP	
Cabinet Minister	Francisco Pacheco	Rural Development and Archaeology and Archives	8 November 2014	4 April 2015	BJP	
