= Rajendra Arlekar =

Governor of Tamil Nadu

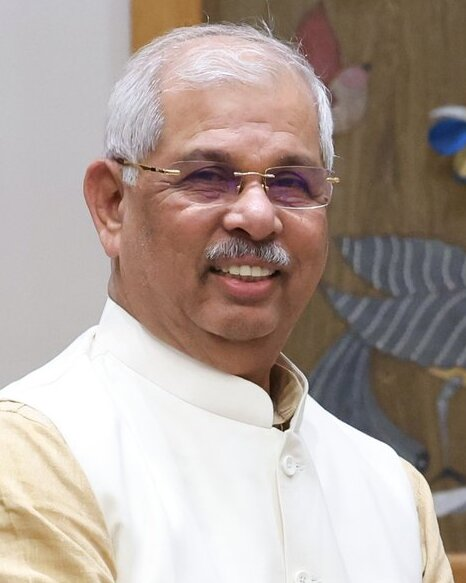
- Arlekar, c. 2025

22nd Governor of Tamil Nadu
- Incumbent
- Assumed office 12 March 2026
- Chief Minister: M. K. Stalin; C. Joseph Vijay
- Preceded by: R. N. Ravi

30th Governor of Kerala
- In office 2 January 2025 – 23 October 2026
- Chief Minister: Pinarayi Vijayan; V. D. Satheesan
- Preceded by: Arif Mohammad Khan
- Succeeded by: Om Prakash Mathur

28th Governor of Bihar
- In office 17 February 2023 – 1 January 2025
- Chief Minister: Nitish Kumar
- Preceded by: Phagu Chauhan
- Succeeded by: Arif Mohammad Khan

21st Governor of Himachal Pradesh
- In office 13 July 2021 – 16 February 2023
- Chief Minister: Jai Ram Thakur; Sukhvinder Singh Sukhu
- Preceded by: Bandaru Dattatreya
- Succeeded by: Shiv Pratap Shukla

Minister of Forest, Environment and Panchayat of Goa
- In office 1 October 2015 – 14 March 2017
- Chief Minister: Laxmikant Parsekar

Speaker of the Goa Legislative Assembly
- In office 16 March 2012 – 1 October 2015
- Preceded by: Pratapsingh Rane
- Succeeded by: Anant Shet

Member of the Goa Legislative Assembly
- In office 2012–2017
- Preceded by: Dayanand Sopte
- Succeeded by: Manohar Ajgaonkar
- Constituency: Pernem
- In office 2002–2007
- Preceded by: Jose Philip D'Souza
- Succeeded by: Jose Philip D'Souza
- Constituency: Vasco Da Gama

Personal details
- Born: Rajendra Vishwanath Arlekar; 23 April 1954 (age 72) Nova Goa, Goa, Portuguese India
- Party: Bharatiya Janata Party (since 1989)
- Spouse: Anagha Arlekar
- Children: 2
- Profession: Politician
- Website: rajendraarlekar.in

Rajendra Vishwanath Arlekar (born 23 April 1954) is an Indian politician who is serving as the Governor of Tamil Nadu since 12 March 2026. Previously, he had served as the Governor of Bihar, Himachal Pradesh and Governor of Kerala. A member of the Bharatiya Janata Party, he was elected twice to the Goa Legislative Assembly. He served as a cabinet minister in the Government of Goa from 2015 to 2017 and was the speaker of the Goa assembly from 2012 to 2015

== Early and personal life ==
Arlekar was born at Nova Goa, Portuguese India (present-day Panaji, Goa), to Vishwanath Arlekar and Tilomattama. He completed his schooling at St. Joseph’s Institute in Vasco da Gama and then did his degree in Commerce from M.E.S. College in Zuarinagar. He belongs to the Dalit community. He is married to Anagha and has two children.

== Political career ==
Arlekar was associated with the Rashtriya Swayamsevak Sangh (RSS) during his childhood. He was imprisoned during the Emergency. He joined the Bharatiya Janata Party (BJP) in 1989. He held various positions within the party, and later served as the state president of the BJP Goa wing of the party. He was elected to the Goa Legislative Assembly for the first time in the 2002 Goa Legislative Assembly election, and was re-elected in 2012. He was elected as the speaker of the assembly in 2012, and during his tenure as the speaker, Goa assembly became the first legislative assembly in India to adopt a paperless system.

In October 2015, Arlekar was appointed the minister for environment and forests in the Government of Goa.

== Governorships (2021–present) ==
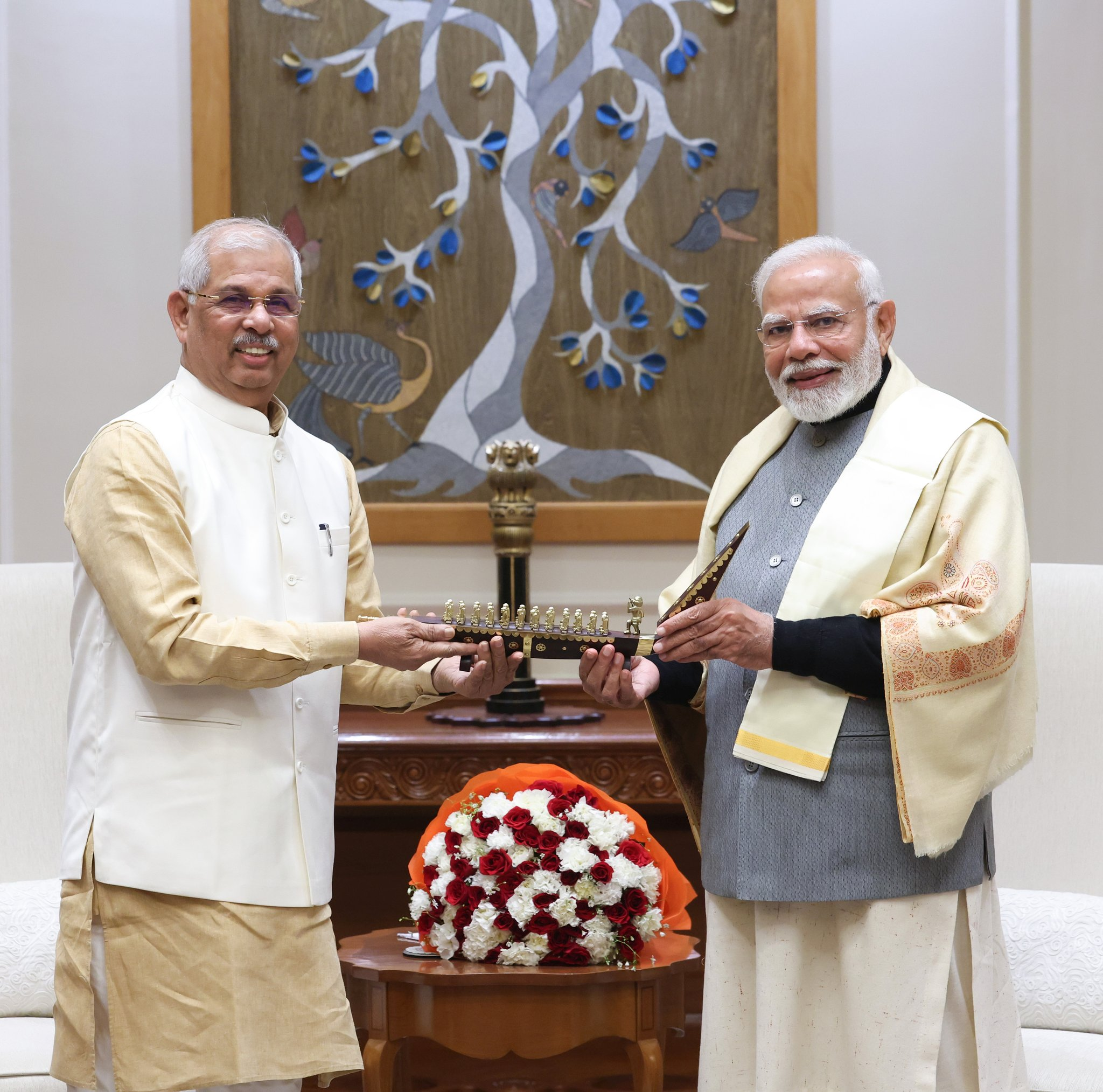
The Governor of Kerala, Rajendra Arlekar meets Prime Minister Narendra Modi.

=== Governor of Himachal Pradesh (2021–2023) ===
Being appointed as a governor, Arlekar took oath as the Governor of Himachal Pradesh on 13 July 2021, replacing Bandaru Dattatreya who was transferred as the Governor of Haryana. Arlekar served in this position until 20 February 2023, when he was transferred as the Governor of Bihar. Shiv Pratap Shukla became his successor in Himachal Pradesh.

=== Governor of Bihar (2023–2025) ===
On 16 February 2023, Arlekar was sworn in as the 38th Governor of Bihar replacing Phagu Chauhan. He continued this office until 2 January 2025 when he was transferred as the Governor of Kerala. Arif Mohammad Khan became his successor his Bihar.

=== Governor of Kerala (2025–2026) ===
On 2 January 2025, Arlekar took charge as the 30th Governor of Kerala replacing Arif Mohammad Khan. He continued his office till 23 October 2026, till Om Prakash Mathur became his successor.

=== Governor of Tamil Nadu (2026-present) ===
On 12 March 2026, Arlekar was sworn in as the 21st Governor of Tamil Nadu succeeding R. N. Ravi. He was holding additional charge of Tamil Nadu along with Kerala till 15 October 2026. He is now currently appointed as full-time governor of Tamil Nadu.

== Posts held ==
| No. | Post | | Tenure | Term length | Party |
|---|---|---|---|---|---|
| 1 | Member of the Goa Legislative Assembly, Vasco Da Gama | Member of the Goa Legislative Assembly | 2002 – 2007 | 5 years | BJP |
| 2 | Member of the Goa Legislative Assembly, Pernem | Member of the Goa Legislative Assembly | 2012 – 2017 | 5 years | BJP |
| 3 | Speaker of the Goa Legislative Assembly | | 16 March 2012 – 1 October 2015 | 3 years, 199 days | BJP |
| 4 | Governor of Himachal Pradesh | Governor, India (5 years, 130 days) | 13 July 2021 – 20 February 2023 | 1 year, 222 days | Apolitical |
| 5 | Governor of Bihar | Governor, India (5 years, 130 days) | 17 February 2023 – 2 January 2025 | 1 year, 320 days | Apolitical |
| 6 | Governor of Kerala | Governor, India (5 years, 130 days) | 2 January 2025 – 23 October 2026 | 1 year, 294 days | Apolitical |
| 7 | Governor of Tamil Nadu | Governor, India (5 years, 130 days) | 12 March 2026 – Incumbent | 253 days | Apolitical |

Goa Legislative Assembly
| Preceded by Jose Philip D'Souza | Member of the Legislative Assembly for Vasco Da Gama; 2002 – 2007 | Succeeded by Jose Philip D'Souza |
| Preceded by Dayanand Sopte | Member of the Legislative Assembly for Pernem; 2012 – 2017 | Succeeded by Manohar Ajgaonkar |
| Preceded by Pratapsingh Rane | Speaker of Goa Legislative Assembly; 16 March 2012 – 01 October 2015 | Succeeded by Anant Shet |
Government offices
| Preceded by Bandaru Dattatreya | Governor of Himachal Pradesh; 8 July 2021 – 13 February 2023 | Succeeded by Shiv Pratap Shukla |
| Preceded by Phagu Chauhan | Governor of Bihar; 17 February 2023 – 1 January 2025 | Succeeded by Arif Mohammad Khan |
| Preceded by Arif Mohammad Khan | Governor of Kerala; 2 January 2025 – 23 October 2026 | Succeeded by Om Prakash Mathur |
| Preceded by R. N. Ravi | Governor of Tamil Nadu; 12 March 2026 – Present | Incumbent |
