= Fifth Pratapsingh Rane ministry =

- Ministry of Goa
- Date formed: 7 June 2005
- Date dissolved: 7 June 2007

People and organisations
- Head of state: Governor S. C. Jamir
- Head of government: Pratapsingh Rane
- Member parties: Indian National Congress
- Status in legislature: Majority

History
- Election: 2002
- Legislature term: 5 years
- Predecessor: President's rule
- Successor: Kamat cabinet

Pratapsingh Rane cabinet was the Council of Ministers in Goa Legislative Assembly headed by Chief Minister Pratapsingh Rane.

== Council of Ministers ==
Name	Office	Portfolio
Pratapsingh Rane	Chief Minister	Minister of Home & Finance
Dr. Wilfred de Souza	Deputy Chief Minister	Minister of Tourism, Environment, Science & Technology
Luizinho Faleiro	Minister	Industry, Factories and Boilers, Education
Digambar Kamat	Minister	Power, Mines, Art & Culture
Dayanand Narvekar	Minister	Information Technology, Law and Judiciary, Parliamentary Affairs, Health
Sudin Dhavalikar	Minister	PWD, Co-operation, Archives and Archaeology, Museum
Subhash Shirodkar	Minister	Rural Development, Panchayati Raj, Social Welfare, Craftsmen Training, Women and Child Development
Atanasio Monserrate	Minister	Town and Country Planning, Housing, Provedoria, Civil Supply
Pandurang Madkaikar	Minister	Transport, River Navigation, Sports & Youth
Joaquim Alemao	Minister	Urban Development, Non-Conventional Energy, Labour and Employment, Fisheries
Mickky Pacheco	Minister	Agriculture, Animal Husbandry
