= Daji Salkar =

Indian politician

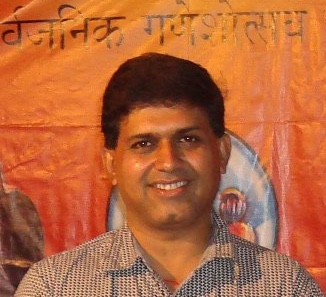
- Salkar in 2012

Member of the Goa Legislative Assembly
- Incumbent
- Assumed office 10 March 2022
- Preceded by: Carlos Almeida
- Constituency: Vasco Da Gama

Personal details
- Born: Krishna Viswambhar Salkar
- Party: Bharatiya Janata Party
- Education: B. Com
- Alma mater: MES College
- Profession: Business/Landlord

Krishna Viswambhar "Daji" Salkar is an Indian politician from Goa and a member of the Goa Legislative Assembly. Salkar won the Vasco Da Gama Assembly constituency on the Bharatiya Janata Party ticket in the 2022 Goa Legislative Assembly election. Salkar defeated Carlos Almeida of the Indian National Congress by 3,657 votes.

== Career ==
Salkar was previously the chairman of the MPDA. In the 2017 Goa Legislative Assembly election, he contested as an independent candidate and lost. He joined the BJP in 2021.
