= Dhavalikar =

Dhavalikar is an Indian surname. Notable people with the surname include:

- Deepak Dhavalikar (born 1958), Indian politician
- Madhukar Keshav Dhavalikar (1930–2018), Indian historian and archaeologist
- Sudin Dhavalikar (born 1956), Indian politician
