= Govind Gaude =

Indian politician

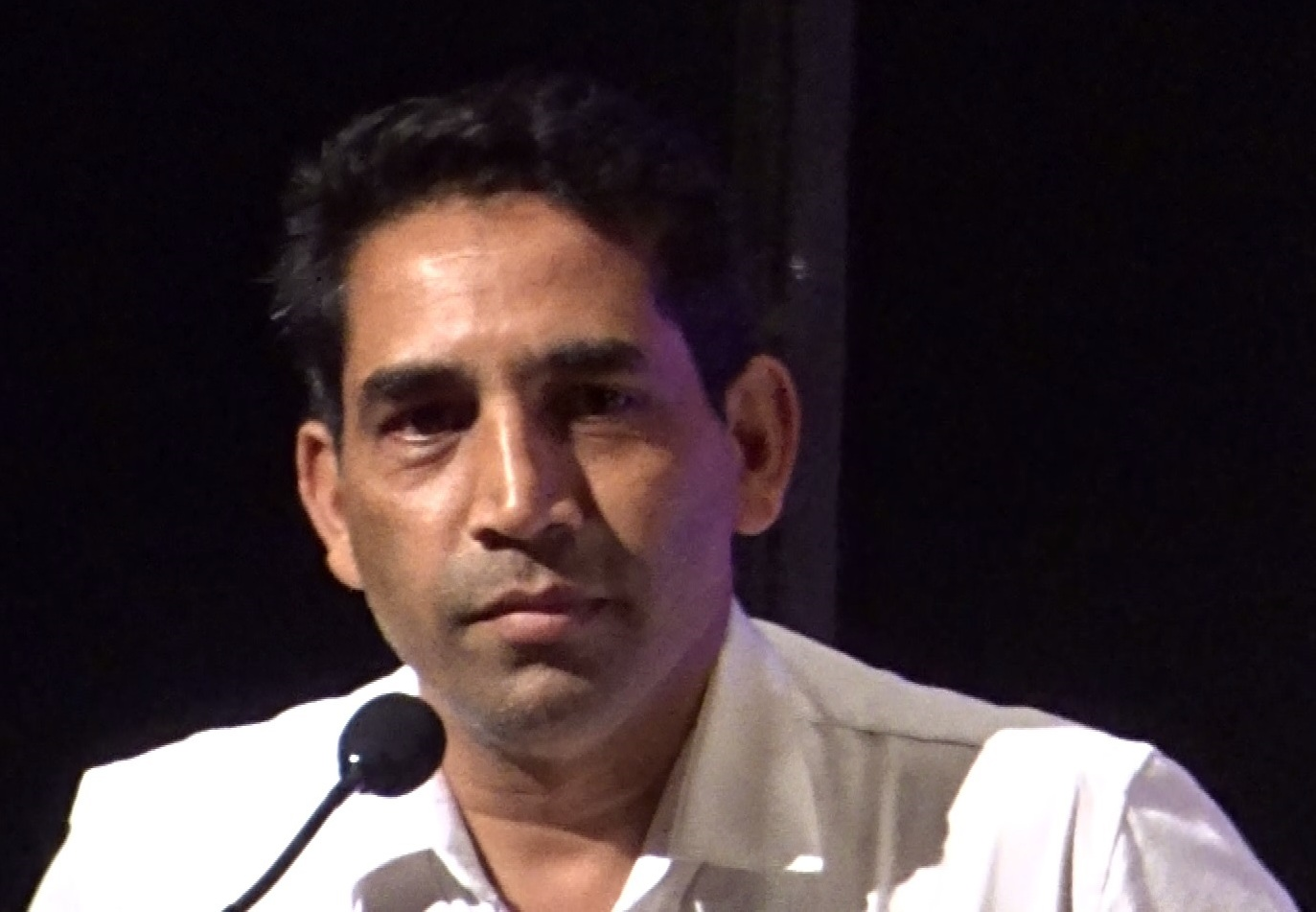
- Gaude in 2017

Minister of Art and Culture, Civil Supplies and Price Control and Tribal Welfare Government of Goa
- In office March 2022 – June 2025

Member of the Goa Legislative Assembly
- Incumbent
- Assumed office 2017
- Preceded by: Deepak Dhavalikar
- Constituency: Priol

Personal details
- Born: 2 October 1971 (age 54)
- Party: Bharatiya Janata Party (since 2022)
- Other political affiliations: Independent (2012–2022)

Govind Shepu Gaude is an Indian politician who serves as a member of the Goa Legislative Assembly, representing the Priol constituency since 2017. Formerly, he was associated with Indian National Congress. He contested the 2007 Assembly elections from the Marcaim constituency. Gaude served as the Minister of Art and Culture, Civil Supplies and Price Control and Tribal Welfare in the Second Pramod Sawant ministry, until he was sacked in June 2025 by Sawant.
