= Poinguinim Assembly constituency =

Former constituency of the Goa Legislative Assembly, in India

Coordinates: 14.97°N 74.09°E

Poinguinim
- Former constituency for the Goa Legislative Assembly

Constituency details
- Country: India
- Region: Western India
- State: Goa
- District: South Goa
- Lok Sabha constituency: South Goa
- Established: 1989
- Abolished: 2008
- Reservation: None

Poinguinim was one of the 40 Goa Legislative Assembly constituencies of the state of Goa in southern India. It fell under South Goa Lok Sabha Constituency.

== Members of the Legislative Assembly ==
Election	Member	Party
1989	Vasu Paik Gaonkar	Indian National Congress
1994	Govind Raghuchandra Acharya	Maharashtrawadi Gomantak Party
1999	Isidore Fernandes	Independent politician
2002	Isidore Fernandes	Indian National Congress
2004 By-election	Isidore Fernandes	Bharatiya Janata Party
2005 By-election	Ramesh Tawadkar	Bharatiya Janata Party
2007	Ramesh Tawadkar	Bharatiya Janata Party

== Election results ==
=== Assembly Election 2007 ===
2007 Goa Legislative Assembly election : Poinguinim
Party	Candidate	Votes	%	±%
BJP	Ramesh Tawadkar	6,158	50.78%	▲2.22
INC	Fernandes Isidore Aleixinho	5,958	49.13%	▲8.63
Margin of victory		200	1.65%	▼6.41
Turnout		12,127	77.65%	▲3.70
Registered electors		15,604		▲4.72
BJP hold		Swing	▲2.22	

=== Assembly By-election 2005 ===
2005 Goa Legislative Assembly by-election : Poinguinim
Party	Candidate	Votes	%	±%
BJP	Ramesh Tawadkar	5,356	48.56%	▼12.35
INC	Isidore Fernandes	4,467	40.50%	▲1.42
Independent	Monterio Leao Fhilipe	1,205	10.93%	New
Margin of victory		889	8.06%	▼13.77
Turnout		11,029	74.01%	▼3.79
Registered electors		14,900		▲1.43
BJP hold		Swing	▼12.35	

=== Assembly By-election 2004 ===
2004 Goa Legislative Assembly by-election : Poinguinim
Party	Candidate	Votes	%	±%
BJP	Isidore Fernandes	6,963	60.91%	▲27.87
INC	Govind Raghuchandra Acharya	4,468	39.09%	▼10.32
Margin of victory		2,495	21.83%	▲5.47
Turnout		11,431	77.81%	▲0.13
Registered electors		14,690		▼0.05
BJP gain from INC		Swing		

=== Assembly Election 2002 ===
2002 Goa Legislative Assembly election : Poinguinim
Party	Candidate	Votes	%	±%
INC	Isidore Fernandes	5,641	49.40%	▲28.72
BJP	Ramesh Tawadkar	3,773	33.04%	▲28.45
NCP	Ulhas Pundalik Naik	2,001	17.52%	New
Margin of victory		1,868	16.36%	▲1.00
Turnout		11,418	77.66%	▲1.27
Registered electors		14,698		▲3.99
INC gain from Independent		Swing		

=== Assembly Election 1999 ===
1999 Goa Legislative Assembly election : Poinguinim
Party	Candidate	Votes	%	±%
Independent	Isidore Fernandes	4,860	45.00%	New
MGP	Govind Raghuchandra Acharya	3,201	29.64%	▼13.21
INC	Gaonkar Vassu Paik	2,234	20.69%	▼11.58
BJP	Pagi Rajendra Dharmu	496	4.59%	New
Margin of victory		1,659	15.36%	▲4.77
Turnout		10,800	76.35%	▼4.94
Registered electors		14,134		▲9.10
Independent gain from MGP		Swing	▲2.15	

=== Assembly Election 1994 ===
1994 Goa Legislative Assembly election : Poinguinim
Party	Candidate	Votes	%	±%
MGP	Govind Raghuchandra Acharya	4,516	42.85%	New
INC	Gaonkar Vasu Paik	3,400	32.26%	▼13.42
Independent	Isidor Diogo Fernandes	2,316	21.98%	New
BSP	Pagi Chandrakant Putu	128	1.21%	New
Margin of victory		1,116	10.59%	▲9.66
Turnout		10,539	79.97%	▲3.55
Registered electors		12,955		▲9.84
MGP gain from INC		Swing	▼2.83	

=== Assembly Election 1989 ===
1989 Goa Legislative Assembly election : Poinguinim
Party	Candidate	Votes	%	±%
INC	Vasu Paik Gaonkar	4,192	45.68%	New
SS	Govind Raghuchandra Acharya	4,107	44.76%	New
Independent	Painguinkar Prabhakar Narayan	196	2.14%	New
Independent	Velip Babu Rama	134	1.46%	New
Independent	Jose Virgilio Countinho	98	1.07%	New
Independent	Kamat Madhusudan Hari	68	0.74%	New
Margin of victory		85	0.93%	
Turnout		9,176	75.52%	
Registered electors		11,794		
INC win (new seat)				

== See also ==
- Canacona (Goa Assembly constituency)
