= Priol Assembly constituency =

Legislative Assembly constituency in Goa State, India

Coordinates: 15.43°N 74°E

Priol
- Constituency No. 20 for the Goa Legislative Assembly

Constituency details
- Country: India
- Region: Western India
- State: Goa
- District: North Goa
- Lok Sabha constituency: North Goa
- Established: 1989
- Total electors: 31,017
- Reservation: None

Member of Legislative Assembly
- 8th Goa Legislative Assembly
- Incumbent Govind Gaude
- Party: Bharatiya Janata Party

Priol Assembly constituency is one of the 40 Goa Legislative Assembly constituencies of the state of Goa in southern India. Priol is also one of the 20 constituencies falling under North Goa Lok Sabha constituency.

== Members of Legislative Assembly ==
Priol constituency was formed, in 1984 from some areas of Ponda and Marcaim constituencies after Goa attained Statehood.

Year	Member	Party
1989	Kashinath Jalmi	Maharashtrawadi Gomantak Party
1994	Kashinath Jalmi	Maharashtrawadi Gomantak Party
1999	Vishwas Satarkar	Bharatiya Janata Party
2002	Vishwas Satarkar	Bharatiya Janata Party
2007	Deepak Dhavalikar	Maharashtrawadi Gomantak Party
2012	Deepak Dhavalikar	Maharashtrawadi Gomantak Party
2017	Govind Gaude	Independent
2022	Govind Gaude	Bharatiya Janata Party

== Election results ==
=== 2027 Assembly election ===
2027 Goa Legislative Assembly election: Priol
Party	Candidate	Votes	%	±%
INC				
NDA				
NOTA	None of the above			
Majority				
Turnout				
gain from		Swing		

=== Assembly Election 2022 ===
2022 Goa Legislative Assembly election : Priol
Party	Candidate	Votes	%	±%
BJP	Govind Gaude	11,019	39.26%	New
MGP	Deepak Dhavalikar	10,806	38.50%	▼0.33
Independent	Sandeep Nigalye	2,697	9.61%	New
RGP	Vishvesh Naik	2,517	8.97%	New
INC	Dinesh Shiva Zalmi	303	1.08%	▼0.51
AAP	Nonu Chandrakant Naik	245	0.87%	▼0.82
NOTA	None of the Above	244	0.87%	▼0.79
Margin of victory		213	0.76%	▼16.63
Turnout		28,065	90.49%	▼0.64
Registered electors		31,017		▲4.89
BJP gain from Independent		Swing	▼16.96	

=== Assembly Election 2017 ===
2017 Goa Legislative Assembly election : Priol
Party	Candidate	Votes	%	±%
Independent	Govind Gaude	15,149	56.22%	New
MGP	Deepak Dhavalikar	10,463	38.83%	▼10.76
AAP	Dr. Dattaram B. Dessai	456	1.69%	New
NOTA	None of the Above	448	1.66%	New
INC	Ramkrishna B. Jalmi	429	1.59%	▼4.98
Margin of victory		4,686	17.39%	▲8.90
Turnout		26,945	91.13%	▲1.50
Registered electors		29,568		▲7.15
Independent gain from MGP		Swing	▲6.63	

=== Assembly Election 2012 ===
2012 Goa Legislative Assembly election : Priol
Party	Candidate	Votes	%	±%
MGP	Deepak Dhavalikar	12,264	49.59%	▼1.38
Independent	Govind Gaude	10,164	41.10%	New
INC	Dhaku A. Madkaikar	1,625	6.57%	▼8.34
AITC	Shashi Panjikar	414	1.67%	New
Goa Vikas Party	Rama Krishna Borkar	201	0.81%	New
Margin of victory		2,100	8.49%	▼12.32
Turnout		24,732	89.39%	▲11.60
Registered electors		27,595		▲3.60
MGP hold		Swing	▼1.38	

=== Assembly Election 2007 ===
2007 Goa Legislative Assembly election : Priol
Party	Candidate	Votes	%	±%
MGP	Deepak Dhavalikar	10,591	50.96%	▲27.66
BJP	Vishwas Satarkar	6,266	30.15%	▼11.42
INC	Dr.Kashinath Jalmi	3,099	14.91%	▼18.10
CPI	Gaude Sham	324	1.56%	New
Independent	Naik Rohidas	196	0.94%	New
SS	Naik Uday	169	0.81%	▼1.19
Margin of victory		4,325	20.81%	▲12.25
Turnout		20,781	77.92%	▲2.77
Registered electors		26,635		▲3.23
MGP gain from BJP		Swing	▲9.40	

=== Assembly Election 2002 ===
2002 Goa Legislative Assembly election : Priol
Party	Candidate	Votes	%	±%
BJP	Vishwas Satarkar	8,071	41.57%	▲4.34
INC	Amonkar Shrikant Sagun	6,409	33.01%	▲6.98
MGP	Dr.Kashinath Jalmi	4,524	23.30%	▼2.75
SS	Kerkar Gorakh Suresh	388	2.00%	▲0.37
Margin of victory		1,662	8.56%	▼2.61
Turnout		19,416	75.16%	▲2.12
Registered electors		25,802		▲7.03
BJP hold		Swing	▲4.34	

=== Assembly Election 1999 ===
1999 Goa Legislative Assembly election : Priol
Party	Candidate	Votes	%	±%
BJP	Vishwas Satarkar	6,563	37.23%	New
MGP	Dr.Kashinath Jalmi	4,593	26.05%	▼18.44
INC	Amonkar Shrikant Sagun	4,589	26.03%	New
Independent	Naik Rajendra Datta	1,568	8.89%	New
SS	Desai Rajesh Kalidas	287	1.63%	New
Margin of victory		1,970	11.17%	▲3.69
Turnout		17,630	73.01%	▼4.80
Registered electors		24,107		▲4.72
BJP gain from MGP		Swing	▼7.27	

=== Assembly Election 1994 ===
1994 Goa Legislative Assembly election : Priol
Party	Candidate	Votes	%	±%
MGP	Dr.Kashinath Jalmi	7,982	44.49%	▼26.73
Independent	Verenkar Mohan Mahadev	6,640	37.01%	New
INC	Gaonkar Babusso Savlo	2,816	15.70%	New
BSP	Gaude Shantaram Ganesh	195	1.09%	New
Margin of victory		1,342	7.48%	▼39.45
Turnout		17,940	76.89%	▲0.27
Registered electors		23,021		▲8.22
MGP hold		Swing	▼26.73	

=== Assembly Election 1989 ===
1989 Goa Legislative Assembly election : Priol
Party	Candidate	Votes	%	±%
MGP	Dr.Kashinath Jalmi	11,766	71.22%	New
INC	Satkar Babal Babuso	4,013	24.29%	New
Independent	Chari Ramesh Govind	171	1.04%	New
Independent	Naik Gaonkar Prabhakar Pandurang	134	0.81%	New
Independent	Ashok Putu Naik	112	0.68%	New
Margin of victory		7,753	46.93%	
Turnout		16,521	76.23%	
Registered electors		21,273		
MGP win (new seat)				

== See also ==
- List of constituencies of the Goa Legislative Assembly
- North Goa district
