= Govind Raghuchandra Acharya =

Indian politician

Govind Raghuchandra Acharya is an Indian politician and member of the Maharashtrawadi Gomantak Party who is a former member of the Goa Legislative Assembly from the Poinguinim constituency.
