= Altone D'Costa =

Indian politician and businessperson

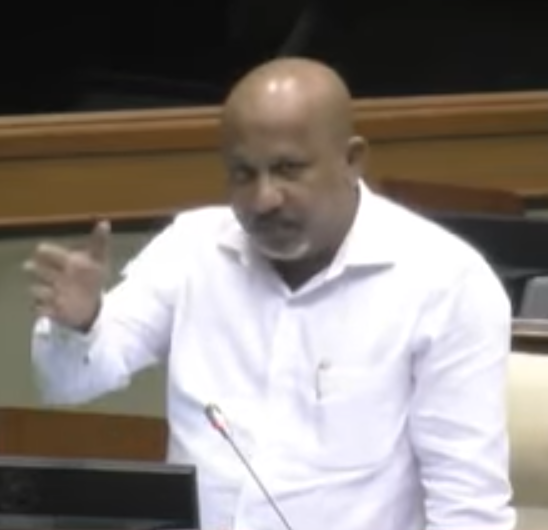
- D'Costa in 2024

Member of Goa Legislative Assembly
- Incumbent
- Assumed office 10 March 2022
- Preceded by: Chandrakant Kavlekar
- Constituency: Quepem

Personal details
- Born: 1976/77 (age 45—46) Goa, India
- Party: Indian National Congress
- Spouse: Valanki D'Costa
- Education: Secondary School Certificate
- Occupation: Politician; businessman
- Website: twitter.com/altone_d

Altone D'Costa (born 1976/77), is an Indian politician and businessman who has served as a member of Goa Legislative Assembly representing the Quepem Assembly constituency since 2022. He contested on Indian National Congress ticket in 2022 Goa Legislative Assembly election and emerged victorious. He defeated former Deputy Chief Minister of Goa and four-term BJP MLA, Chandrakant Kavlekar by a margin of 3,601 votes.

== Early and personal life ==
Altone D'Costa was born to Cruzinho D'Costa in Goa. He completed his Secondary School Certificate from Perpetual Succour Convent High School, Navelim in 1992. D'Costa also has completed an electric and welding course from Agnel Trade School, Verna in 1995.

D'Costa is married to businesswoman, Valanki D'Costa. The couple own the La Grace Resort Chains in Goa. He currently resides in Quepem, Goa.
