= Quepem Assembly constituency =

Legislative Assembly constituency in Goa State, India

Coordinates: 15.23°N 74.07°E

Quepem
- Constituency No. 36 for the Goa Legislative Assembly

Constituency details
- Country: India
- Region: Western India
- State: Goa
- District: South Goa
- Lok Sabha constituency: South Goa
- Established: 1963
- Total electors: 33,080
- Reservation: None

Member of Legislative Assembly
- 8th Goa Legislative Assembly
- Incumbent Altone D'Costa
- Party: Indian National Congress

Quepem is one of the 40 Goa Legislative Assembly constituencies of the state of Goa in southern India. Quepem is also one of the 20 constituencies falling under South Goa Lok Sabha constituency.

== Members of Goa Legislative Assembly ==
Year	Member	Party
1963	Dattaram Desai	Maharashtrawadi Gomantak Party
1967	Shaba Desai	Maharashtrawadi Gomantak Party
1972	Dhulo Kuttikar	Maharashtrawadi Gomantak Party
1977	Vaikunth Desai	Indian National Congress
1980	Vaikunth Desai	Indian National Congress
1984	Vaikunth Desai	Indian National Congress
1989	Prakash Velip	Maharashtrawadi Gomantak Party
1994	Prakash Velip	Maharashtrawadi Gomantak Party
1999	Prakash Velip	Maharashtrawadi Gomantak Party
2002	Chandrakant Kavlekar	Indian National Congress
2007	Chandrakant Kavlekar	Indian National Congress
2012	Chandrakant Kavlekar	Indian National Congress
2017	Chandrakant Kavlekar	Indian National Congress
2022	Altone D'Costa	Indian National Congress

== Election results ==
=== 2027 Assembly election ===
2027 Goa Legislative Assembly election: Quepem
Party	Candidate	Votes	%	±%
INC				
NDA				
NOTA	None of the above			
Majority				
Turnout				
gain from		Swing		

=== Assembly Election 2022 ===
2022 Goa Legislative Assembly election : Quepem
Party	Candidate	Votes	%	±%
INC	Altone D'Costa	14,994	52.51%	▲1.78
BJP	Chandrakant Kavlekar	11,393	39.90%	▼1.11
RGP	Vishal Gauns Dessai	1,144	4.01%	New
AAP	Raul Pereira	315	1.10%	▼4.09
NOTA	None of the Above	246	0.86%	▼0.48
NCP	Aloysious D'Silva	237	0.83%	New
Margin of victory		3,601	12.61%	▲2.89
Turnout		28,556	86.33%	▲1.13
Registered electors		33,078		▲5.70
INC hold		Swing	▲1.78	

=== Assembly Election 2017 ===
2017 Goa Legislative Assembly election : Quepem
Party	Candidate	Votes	%	±%
INC	Babu Kavlekar	13,525	50.73%	▲6.55
BJP	Prakash Velip	10,933	41.01%	New
AAP	Joao Fernandes	1,385	5.19%	New
NOTA	None of the Above	357	1.34%	New
Goa Su-Raj Party	Charles D'Silva	251	0.94%	New
MGP	Sudesh Gaude	211	0.79%	▼17.44
Margin of victory		2,592	9.72%	▼15.89
Turnout		26,662	85.20%	▼0.91
Registered electors		31,293		▲8.29
INC hold		Swing	▲6.55	

=== Assembly Election 2012 ===
2012 Goa Legislative Assembly election : Quepem
Party	Candidate	Votes	%	±%
INC	Babu Kavlekar	10,994	44.18%	▼0.26
Independent	Prakash Velip	4,621	18.57%	New
MGP	Prakash Arjun Velip	4,536	18.23%	▲14.40
UGDP	Colaco Manuel	4,356	17.50%	New
Goa Vikas Party	Joseph Gonsalves	354	1.42%	New
Margin of victory		6,373	25.61%	▲20.15
Turnout		24,885	86.03%	▲10.42
Registered electors		28,898		▲2.60
INC hold		Swing	▼0.26	

=== Assembly Election 2007 ===
2007 Goa Legislative Assembly election : Quepem
Party	Candidate	Votes	%	±%
INC	Babu Kavlekar	9,474	44.44%	▼2.57
BJP	Prakash Velip	8,311	38.98%	▲1.76
Save Goa Front	Pereira Raul	2,303	10.80%	New
MGP	Gaonkar Narayan Datta	817	3.83%	▲1.61
Independent	Thulo Shanu Velip	353	1.66%	New
Margin of victory		1,163	5.45%	▼4.33
Turnout		21,320	75.47%	▲2.56
Registered electors		28,167		▲8.64
INC hold		Swing	▼2.57	

=== Assembly Election 2002 ===
2002 Goa Legislative Assembly election : Quepem
Party	Candidate	Votes	%	±%
INC	Babu Kavlekar	8,913	47.01%	▲11.31
BJP	Prakash Velip	7,058	37.22%	▲14.35
NCP	Pereira Rahul Rocky	1,602	8.45%	New
MGP	Ganesh Narba Naik Dessai	422	2.23%	▼34.38
UGDP	D'Silva Patsy Rusario	385	2.03%	▼2.73
Goa Su-Raj Party	Alvito Joachim Mendonsa	302	1.59%	New
Independent	Bhiku Shanu Velip	267	1.41%	New
Margin of victory		1,855	9.78%	▲8.88
Turnout		18,961	73.09%	▲6.46
Registered electors		25,927		▲12.03
INC gain from MGP		Swing	▲10.41	

=== Assembly Election 1999 ===
1999 Goa Legislative Assembly election : Quepem
Party	Candidate	Votes	%	±%
MGP	Prakash Velip	5,648	36.60%	▼9.32
INC	Raul Rocky Pereira	5,509	35.70%	New
BJP	Gaonkar Shanu Malu	3,530	22.88%	New
UGDP	Pereira Ajay Albert	735	4.76%	New
Margin of victory		139	0.90%	▼18.76
Turnout		15,431	66.64%	▼9.03
Registered electors		23,143		▲6.17
MGP hold		Swing	▼9.32	

=== Assembly Election 1994 ===
1994 Goa Legislative Assembly election : Quepem
Party	Candidate	Votes	%	±%
MGP	Prakash Velip	7,579	45.92%	▼15.40
Independent	Pereira Raul Roque	4,335	26.27%	New
INC	Velip Kushali Kusth	2,077	12.59%	New
UGDP	Rebello Remet Paulo	1,746	10.58%	New
Independent	Shaikh Azim	170	1.03%	New
BSP	Nomi Govind Gaunkar	170	1.03%	New
Margin of victory		3,244	19.66%	▼8.98
Turnout		16,503	73.75%	▼0.52
Registered electors		21,799		▲10.41
MGP hold		Swing	▼15.40	

=== Assembly Election 1989 ===
1989 Goa Legislative Assembly election : Quepem
Party	Candidate	Votes	%	±%
MGP	Prakash Velip	9,229	61.33%	New
INC	Gauns Desai Voikunt Govind	4,919	32.69%	
Independent	Desai Amrut Dikush	413	2.74%	New
Margin of victory		4,310	28.64%	▲24.88
Turnout		15,049	74.13%	▲4.57
Registered electors		19,743		▼9.06
MGP gain from INC		Swing		

=== Assembly Election 1984 ===
1984 Goa, Daman and Diu Legislative Assembly election : Quepem
Party	Candidate	Votes	%	±%
INC	Vaikunth Desai	5,375	34.55%	New
Independent	Fernandes Domnic Joaquim	4,790	30.79%	New
MGP	Diniz Patrick	3,405	21.89%	New
Independent	Adel Vithoba Nagu	836	5.56%	New
Independent	Mohamad Hakim Yusuf	260	1.73%	New
BJP	Hodarkar Vithu Dhaku	159	1.06%	New
Independent	Rodrigues Thomas Paixao	134	0.89%	New
Margin of victory		585	3.76%	▼16.43
Turnout		15,557	69.80%	▲4.76
Registered electors		21,711		▲12.83
INC gain from INC(U)		Swing	▼20.40	

=== Assembly Election 1980 ===
1980 Goa, Daman and Diu Legislative Assembly election : Quepem
Party	Candidate	Votes	%	±%
INC(U)	Vaikunth Desai	7,073	54.95%	New
MGP	Naik Vithal Sonu	4,474	34.76%	New
JP	Prabhu Dessai Sanjay Hari	538	4.18%	New
CPI(M)	Natakar Ashok Bhal Chandra	166	1.29%	New
Independent	Furtado Gloria Pedro	115	0.89%	New
JP(S)	Dessai Yadavendra Vassudev	108	0.84%	New
Margin of victory		2,599	20.19%	▲14.73
Turnout		12,872	65.30%	▲5.56
Registered electors		19,242		▲12.89
INC(U) gain from INC		Swing	▲15.08	

=== Assembly Election 1977 ===
1977 Goa, Daman and Diu Legislative Assembly election : Quepem
Party	Candidate	Votes	%	±%
INC	Vaikunth Desai	4,168	39.87%	New
MGP	Gaunso Dessai Satish Nilu	3,597	34.40%	
JP	Rauto Dessai Ganesh Shanker	1,194	11.42%	New
Independent	Diniz Patrick Domingo	1,060	10.14%	New
Independent	Dessai Narayan Mahadev	136	1.30%	New
Independent	Parceker Hira Loli	73	0.70%	New
Independent	Naik Keshav Molu	24	0.23%	New
Margin of victory		571	5.46%	▼2.32
Turnout		10,455	60.15%	▼5.84
Registered electors		17,045		▲50.80
INC gain from MGP		Swing	▼4.99	

=== Assembly Election 1972 ===
1972 Goa, Daman and Diu Legislative Assembly election : Quepem
Party	Candidate	Votes	%	±%
MGP	Dhulo Kuttikar	3,406	44.86%	▲2.2
UGP	Dessai Molu Ganba	2,815	37.07%	New
MGP	D. E. F. Shankar Yesso	796	10.48%	
Independent	F Rafaels Silvestre	249	3.28%	New
Independent	Gaudo Naguesh Ragoba	112	1.48%	New
Margin of victory		591	7.78%	▼9.84
Turnout		7,593	65.27%	▼1.50
Registered electors		11,303		▲12.07
MGP hold		Swing	▲2.20	

=== Assembly Election 1967 ===
1967 Goa, Daman and Diu Legislative Assembly election : Quepem
Party	Candidate	Votes	%	±%
MGP	Shaba Desai	2,955	42.66%	New
UGP	D. S. Yeshvant	1,734	25.03%	New
Independent	N. H. Desai	587	8.47%	New
Independent	D. D. Shaba	555	8.01%	New
Independent	D. S. Babni	359	5.18%	New
Independent	V. R. Padiyar	143	2.06%	New
Independent	S. A. Abilio	143	2.06%	New
Margin of victory		1,221	17.63%	
Turnout		6,927	66.00%	
Registered electors		10,086		
MGP win (new seat)				

== See also ==
- List of constituencies of the Goa Legislative Assembly
- South Goa district
