= Manju Naik Gaonkar =

Indian politician (1931–2001)

- Official portrait in 1967

Member of Goa Legislative Assembly
- In office March 1967 – 1972
- Preceded by: Ganba Desai
- Succeeded by: Ganba Desai
- Constituency: Canacona

Deputy Speaker of Goa Legislative Assembly
- In office 18 April 1967 – 25 March 1971
- Preceded by: Mamdali Jiwani
- Succeeded by: Shaba Desai

Personal details
- Born: Manju Balkrishna Naik Gaonkar; 9 September 1931 Kanakona, Goa, Portuguese India
- Died: 15 February 2001 (aged 69) Canacona, Goa, India
- Party: Maharashtrawadi Gomantak Party (1967–1972)
- Spouse: Kamala Gaonkar
- Education: Rani Parvati Devi College of Arts & Commerce, Belgaum; Karnataka University (B.A.)
- Committees: Business Advisory; Rules; Privileges; Public Accounts; Library

Manju Balkrishna Naik Gaonkar (9 September 1931 – 15 February 2001) was an Indian politician from Goa. He was a former member of the Goa Legislative Assembly, representing the Canacona Assembly constituency from 1967 to 1972. He also served as the Deputy speaker in the Goa Legislative Assembly from 1967 to 1971.

== Early and personal life ==
Manju Balkrishna Naik Gaonkar was born at Kanacona, Goa (now Canacona). He completed his Bachelor of Arts from Karnataka University, he was also an alumnus of Rani Parvati Devi College of Arts & Commerce, Belgaum. Gaonkar was also a polyglot and spoke Marathi, Portuguese, English and Hindi. He was married to Kamala Gaonkar and resided at Nagarcem, Canacona, Goa.

== Positions held ==
- Member of the Business Advisory Committee, 1967
- Member of the Rules Committee, 1967
- Chairman of the Privileges Committee, 1967
- Chairman of Public Accounts Committee, 1971–72
- Member of Rules Committee, 1971–72
- Member of Library Committee, 1971–72
