= Pratapsingh Rane =

Indian politician (born 1939)

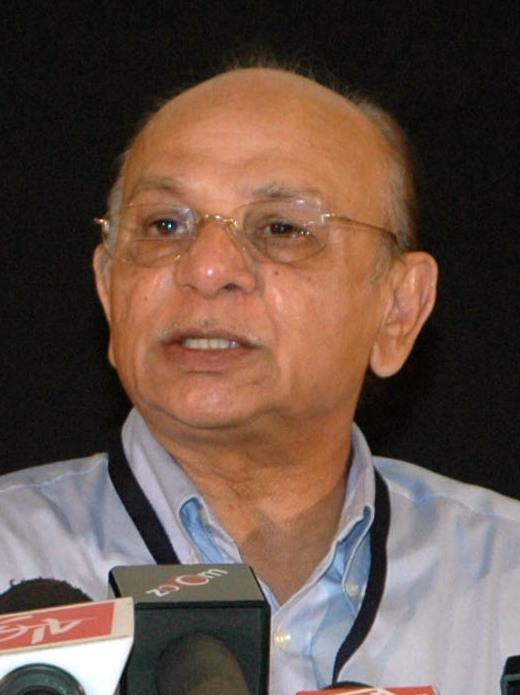
- Rane in 2005

1st Chief Minister of Goa
- In office 7 June 2005 – 8 June 2007
- Governor: S. C. Jamir
- Preceded by: President's rule
- Succeeded by: Digambar Kamat
- In office 2 February 2005 – 4 March 2005
- Governor: S. C. Jamir
- Preceded by: Manohar Parrikar
- Succeeded by: President's rule
- In office 16 December 1994 – 29 July 1998
- Governor: Gopala Ramanujam, Romesh Bhandari, P. C. Alexander, T. R. Satishchandran, J. F. R. Jacob
- Preceded by: Wilfred de Souza
- Succeeded by: Wilfred de Souza
- In office 30 May 1987 – 27 March 1990
- Governor: Gopal Singh, Khurshed Alam Khan
- Preceded by: Office established
- Succeeded by: Churchill Alemao

3rd Chief Minister of Goa, Daman and Diu
- In office 16 January 1980 – 30 May 1987
- Lieutenant Governor: P. S. Gill, Idris Hasan Latif, K. T. Satarawala, Idris Hasan Latif, Gopal Singh
- Preceded by: President's rule
- Succeeded by: Office abolished

Member of the Goa Legislative Assembly
- In office 1989–2022
- Preceded by: constituency established
- Succeeded by: Deviya Rane
- Constituency: Poriem
- In office 1972–1989
- Preceded by: K.G. Appa
- Succeeded by: constituency delimited
- Constituency: Sattari

Speaker of the Goa Legislative Assembly
- In office 15 June 2007 – 6 March 2012
- Preceded by: Francisco Sardinha
- Succeeded by: Rajendra Arlekar
- In office 15 June 1999 – 11 June 2002
- Preceded by: Tomazinho Cardozo
- Succeeded by: Vishwas Satarkar

Personal details
- Born: 28 January 1939 (age 87) Sanquelim, Goa, Portuguese India
- Party: Indian National Congress (since 1977)
- Other political affiliations: Maharashtrawadi Gomantak Party (1972–1977)
- Children: Vishwajit Rane (son)
- Relatives: Deviya Rane (daughter-in-law)
- Education: Texas A&I University (BBA)

Pratapsingh Raoji Rane (born 28 January 1939) is an Indian politician and statesman who served as the third Chief Minister of Goa, Daman and Diu from 1980 to 1987, and as the first Chief Minister of Goa, holding the office five times between 1987 and 2007. Rane was also the former Leader Of Opposition in the Goa Legislative Assembly. He had been a state legislator for nearly 50 years.

Rane is the longest-serving Chief Minister in the history of Goa and also holds the record for the longest continuous tenure as Chief Minister in the state. In 2022, the Pramod Sawant led Government conferred life long cabinet status on Rane.

Rane has been a member of the Indian National Congress since the mid-1970s, and was earlier a prominent figure in the Maharashtrawadi Gomantak Party. In the MGP, he was minister for law and also held other portfolios, in the term beginning 1972.

== Early life ==
Rane comes from the prominent Rane (clan) feudal clan of the Maratha caste that dominated politics in Sattari. The clan had a set of revolts and peace treaties with the Portuguese while the latter were ruling Goa. He completed his schooling in Shri Shivaji Preparatory Military School (Pune), and later obtained a Bachelor in Business Administration degree in the United States from Texas A&I University.

He dominated politics in Goa throughout the 1980s, and for part of the 1990s. His achievements include the launching of the Kadamba Transport Corporation, government-run bus transport system in Goa. He started Schools and Colleges in rural areas.

During his tenure as a Chief Minister, Goa University was established. He built a network of roads connecting villages and towns in Goa. Number of Industrial Estates and Industrial Training Institutes were stated during his tenure which helped Goa to industrialise.

He undertook to build small and big Irrigation Projects in various parts of Goa. He is also a founder member of the International Centre Goa and a founder member of Goa Institute of Management, a premier Management Institute in India.

== Political career ==
In the 1980s, dissidents within the ruling Congress party sought to dislodge Rane from power, by appealing to New Delhi mostly unsuccessfully. Some of his later tenures in power earned criticism allegedly because of growing corruption during his regime. He was leader of the Opposition while the Bharatiya Janata Party (BJP) ruled Goa from the late-1990s until early 2005. His critics, like the then editor of the local Goa newspaper Herald or O Heraldo, Rajan Narayan criticised Rane for not doing enough as the leader of the Opposition.

Rane became chief minister after the Congress's first-ever win in Goa in 1980 mainly as a "consensus candidate", after a bitter battle for the top political slot between the then two Congress heavyweights, Dr Wilfred de Souza and Ananta Narcina Naik, also known as Babu Naik. Naik was subsequently largely marginalised in state politics, while Souza served under Rane in some of his cabinets.

After 5 years of BJP rule, Rane began his fifth term as chief minister in February 2005 after the government fell due to a split in the Goa BJP. A month later, however, the state was put under president’s rule for three months. Rane then served as chief minister for the sixth time, for two years until the June 2007 state elections. Though the Congress Party and its allies won a comfortable majority, Rane was forced to step aside as chief minister due to infighting within the state Congress party, and was forced to step aside in favor of a neutral candidate, Digambar Kamat. Rane was, however, elected speaker of the state assembly when it reconvened a few days later.

== Personal life ==
By profession, Rane is an agriculturist. He is married. He enjoys reading and watching Marathi Drama and also enjoys English Theatre and Western and Indian Classical Music. He loves playing the Piano.. His son Vishwajit Rane is married to Deviya Rane, both of whom are legislators in the Government of Goa.

== Controversies ==
After the BJP attempted a "show of strength" to take over the Goa house, they were stifled by Rane. The BJP accused Rane of acting in a partisan manner to protect the Congress led government.

He has also been accused by businessman, Bhalchandra Naik of demanding Rs 10 crore for being granted Environmental clearance for a mine, of which Rs 6 crore had been paid to his son Vishwajit Rane, MLA from Valpoi.

In 2018, Rane was caught in another controversy, where he called Goan emigrants from United Kingdom, "toilet cleaners". He was asked for an explanation by the state party president, Girish Chodankar.

Preceded by Pratapsinh Rane	Chief Minister of Goa; 1979–1990	Succeeded by Churchill Alemao
Preceded by Manohar Parrikar	Chief Minister of Goa; 2005–2007	Succeeded by Digambar Kamat
