= Deviya Rane =

Indian politician

Deviya Vishwajit Rane
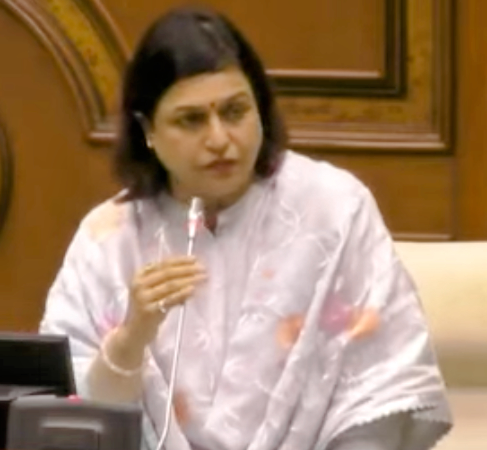
- Rane in 2024

Member of Goa Legislative Assembly
- Incumbent
- Assumed office 10 March 2022
- Preceded by: Pratapsingh Rane
- Constituency: Poriem

Personal details
- Born: Goa, India
- Party: Bharatiya Janata Party
- Spouse: Vishwajit Rane
- Relatives: Pratapsingh Rane (father-in-law)

Deviya Vishwajit Rane is an Indian politician. She was elected to the Poriem Assembly constituency in the 2022 Goa Legislative Assembly election as a member of the Bharatiya Janata Party.

== Personal life ==
Deviya Vishwajit Rane studied at the Bhatikar Model English School and the Parvatibai Chowgule College in Margao. She obtained her MBBS degree from the Goa Medical College. She is married to politician Vishwajit Rane.
