= Shaba Desai =

Indian politician and freedom fighter (1931–2008)

- Official portrait in 1967

Deputy Speaker of Goa Legislative Assembly
- In office 7 April 1971 – 13 March 1972
- Preceded by: Manju Naik Gaonkar
- Succeeded by: Chandrakant Chodankar

Member of Goa Legislative Assembly
- In office 1967–1972
- Preceded by: Dattaram Desai
- Succeeded by: Dhulo Kuttikar
- Constituency: Quepem

Personal details
- Born: Shaba Krishnarao Desai; 25 March 1931 Quepem, Goa, Portuguese India
- Died: 12 November 2008 (aged 77) Goa, India
- Party: Maharashtrawadi Gomantak Party
- Other political affiliations: Indian National Congress; Praja Socialist Party (till 1958)
- Spouse: Sushama Desai
- Education: D.T.C. School, Belgaum (S.S.C); Sahitya Pradna (Marathi); D.M. Fine Arts and Commercial Art; Sir J. J. School of Art
- Occupation: Politician; freedom fighter
- Profession: Teacher
- Committees: Government Assurances; Delegated Legislation; Petitions; Library; Rules; Privileges

Shaba Krishnarao Desai (25 March 1931 – 12 November 2008) was an Indian politician, teacher and freedom fighter who was a former member of the Goa Legislative Assembly, representing the Quepem Assembly constituency from 1967 to 1972. Desai also served as a Deputy Speaker of the Goa Legislative Assembly from 1971 to 1972. He was a member of the Rastra Seva Dal.

== Early and personal life ==
Shaba Krishnarao Desai was born in Quepem. He completed his Secondary School Certificate from D.T.C. School, Belgaum. He was also an alumnus of Sahitya Pradna, D.M. Fine Arts and Commercial Art and Sir J. J. School of Art, Bombay (now Mumbai). He was married to Sushama Desai.

== Career ==
Desai joined Indian National Congress Goa as an underground worker while celebrating the Tere Khol Day. He was arrested and incarcerated for 27 days. Desai was also a member of the Praja Socialist Party till 1958.
