= Babu Kavlekar =

Indian politician (born 1971)

9th Deputy Chief Minister Goa
- In office 13 July 2019 – 15 March 2022 Serving with Babu Ajgaonkar
- Preceded by: Vijai Sardesai
- Succeeded by: Vacant

Member of Goa Legislative Assembly
- In office 2002–2022
- Preceded by: Prakash Velip
- Succeeded by: Altone D'Costa
- Constituency: Quepem

Personal details
- Born: 7 May 1971 (age 55)
- Party: Bharatiya Janta Party (since 2019)
- Other political affiliations: Indian National Congress (2002–2019)
- Occupation: Politician

Chandrakant "Babu" Kavlekar (born 7 May 1971) is an Indian politician and former cabinet minister who served as the Minister of Town and Country Planning, Agriculture, Archives, Archaeology, Factories and Boilers of Goa in the Government of Goa. He belongs to Dhangar caste. He was a four-term member of the Goa Legislative Assembly and represented the Quepem constituency from 2002 to 2022.

== Career ==
In the election for legislative assembly Kavlekar beat BJP candidate Prakash Velip to be elected as MLA for a fourth consecutive term.

On 11 July 2019, he left the Indian National Congress and joined the Bharatiya Janata Party. He was appointed Deputy Chief Minister on 13 July 2019.
