= Loretta D'Souza =

Indian field hockey player

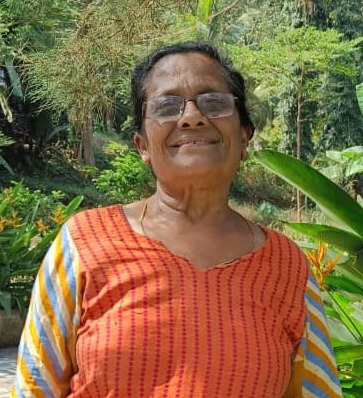
- D'Souza in 2025

Personal information
- Full name: Loretta D'Souza e Shreedharan
- Born: Loretta D'Souza; 1954 or 1955 (age 71–72) Moira, Goa, India
- Height: 155 cm (5 ft 1 in)

Sport
- Sport: Field hockey
- Position: Goalkeeper
National team
Years	Team	Caps	Goals
c. 1978–1983	India		-
Medal record
Women's field hockey
Representing India
Asian Games
Gold medal – first place	1982 New Delhi	Women's tournament
Pre-Olympics
Gold medal – first place	1980 Moscow	Team

Loretta D'Souza e Shreedharan (née D'Souza) is an Indian former field hockey Goalkeeper from Moira, Goa. Described as the first woman from Goa to win international laurels, she was a key player for both the Goa state team and the Indian national team. She represented India as part of its "golden generation" during the late 1970s and early 1980s.

D'Souza was part of the team that won a gold medal at the 1980 Moscow Pre-Olympics and the inaugural gold medal at the 1982 Asian Games in New Delhi. She also participated in two Women's Hockey World Cups the 1978 Women's Hockey World Cup in Madrid and the 1983 Women's Hockey World Cup in Kuala Lumpur.

== Early life ==
Born in Moira, Goa, D'Souza spent the first ten years of her life in Nairobi, Kenya, where her parents were based, before returning to Goa. Her introduction to hockey occurred after she joined St. Xavier's College, Mapusa. She was mentored by the late Ana Figueira, who managed a team called the 'Aquarians'. Her first coach, the late Varkey Tharakhand, helped hone her skills by having her practice with male players to acclimatize her to harder hits.

== Domestic career ==
D'Souza played as a goalkeeper for the Goa state team at several Women's Hockey Nationals. She first caught the attention of selectors at the 1972 National Championship in Gwalior. One of her notable domestic performances occurred in New Delhi in 1974 against Punjab; following her "heroics" in goal during the match, she was lifted by her teammates in celebration, and the team was treated to a celebratory lunch by Sacru Menezes, owner of the City Kitchen restaurant.

She was instrumental in Goa winning the National title, with her performances in goal being highly praised. For her achievements, she received the Jivbadada Kerkar State Award for the 1974–75 season.

== International career ==
D'Souza represented India in several major international tournaments throughout her career. She was the first Goan based in her homeland to be selected for the India squad. However, her international career was often marked by selection challenges; standing at 155 cm (5 ft 1 in), she was sometimes benched in favor of taller goalkeepers such as Nina Asaikar.

Her international appearances included:

- The 1975 Begum Rasool tournament in Chennai (squad selection)
- The 1978 Women's Hockey World Cup in Madrid.
- The 1980 Moscow Pre-Olympics, where the team won a gold medal. D'Souza faced administrative hurdles prior to this tournament, including misplaced visa papers which required a last-minute visit to the Embassy of Russia, New Delhi.
- The 1980 Asian championships in Kyoto.
- The 1981 World Hockey tournament in Buenos Aires.
- The 1982 Asian Games in New Delhi, where the team won the inaugural gold medal.
- The 1983 Women's Hockey World Cup in Kuala Lumpur, where the team finished 11th.

D'Souza played during an era where equipment was rudimentary. She kept goal without a helmet, smock, or kickers, and utilized bamboo-based pads. She also recalled issues with ill-fitting apparel, noting that she often had to wear kits designed for men or pads that were too large for her frame.

Following the team's gold medal victory at the 1982 Asian Games, D'Souza recalled the team being taken on a celebratory trip to see the Taj Mahal.

== Government career ==
After her sporting career, D'Souza joined the IRS and served as a Customs officer. She then retired from the post of Superintendent of Customs at Mormugao.

== Political career ==
Following her retirement from the civil service, D'Souza entered politics. She joined the Aam Aadmi Party and was a candidate for the Vasco Da Gama Assembly constituency in the 2017 Goa Legislative Assembly election.

== Personal life ==
D'Souza is a mother of two sons.

== See also ==
- India women's national field hockey team
