= Dattaram Desai =

Indian politician and activist

- Official portrait in 1963

Member of Goa, Daman and Diu Legislative Assembly
- In office 1963–1967
- Preceded by: constituency established
- Succeeded by: Shaba Desai
- Constituency: Quepem

Personal details
- Born: Dattaram Deu Naique Desai; 11 September 1930 Cuncolim, Goa, Portuguese India
- Died: Unknown
- Party: Independent (1967–1972)
- Other political affiliations: Maharashtrawadi Gomantak Party (1963–1965)
- Education: Secondary School Certificate
- Occupation: Politician; activist
- Committees: Block Advisory

Dattaram Deu Naique Desai (11 September 1930 – unknown) (Note: the surname Desai is also spelled as Dessai according to) was an Indian politician and independence activist. He was a former member of the Goa, Daman and Diu Legislative Assembly, representing the Quepem Assembly constituency (Note: a source from Times of India states Desai represented the Rivona Assembly constituency which is false.) from 1963 to 1967. He was also a member of the Azad Gomantak Dal.

== Early life and education ==
Dattaram Deu Desai was born to Deu B. Desai in Cuncolim, Goa. He completed his Secondary School Certificate.

== Career ==
Desai contested in the 1963 Goa, Daman and Diu Legislative Assembly election from the Quepem Assembly constituency on the Maharashtrawadi Gomantak Party (MGP) ticket and emerged victorious, he served for five years from 1963 to 1967.

He later quit the party prior to the elections and unsuccessfully contested as an independent candidate in the 1967 Goa, Daman and Diu Legislative Assembly election from the same constituency, he lost to MGP candidate, Shaba Desai by a margin of 2887 votes. This marked Desai's last election participation in his political career.

== Role in Goan independence movement (1954–1958) ==
In 1954, Desai became a member of the Azad Gomantak Dal and worked as an underground member. In 1955, he and his associates launched an attack on the Cuncolim police station, seizing all of the weapons and ammunition stored in the armoury. Although he faced the risk of getting caught, Desai managed to evade arrest on 30 June 1956. In July 1958, Desai took part in the Daman Union Territory attacks. He also accompanied the Indian Army battalion from Majali, Karnataka to Margão city during the Indian annexation of Goa.

== Awards ==
Desai was awarded the Tamrapatra by the Government of India in 1973.

== Legacy ==
On 18 January 2014, the Cuncolim Municipal Council (CMC) named the Sanvorcotto road in Desai's honor, followed by five other independence activists.

== Positions held ==
- Member of Block Advisory Committee of the Community Development Blocks, 1964
