= Vaikunth Desai =

Indian politician and teacher (born 1942)

Member of Goa Legislative Assembly
- In office 1977–1989
- Preceded by: Dhulo Kuttikar
- Succeeded by: Prakash Velip
- Constituency: Quepem

Deputy Speaker of Goa Legislative Assembly
- In office 22 January 1980 – 7 January 1985
- Preceded by: Makanbhai Bhathela
- Succeeded by: Shamjibhai Solanki

Personal details
- Born: Vaikunt Givind Desai; 25 May 1942 (age 83) Quepem, Goa, Portuguese India
- Party: Indian National Congress (1977–1989)
- Education: Fifth grade of Lyceum
- Alma mater: Infant Jesus High School, Cuncolim; S.P.C. College, Margao; Nirmala Institute, Panaji (B.Sc); Tilak College Of Education, Pune; (M.Ed)
- Occupation: Politician
- Profession: Teacher
- Cabinet: Minister
- Committees: Block Advisory; Library; Privileges; Seine Operators; Mechanised Boat Owners; Tribal Sub-plan; Education Bill; Pollution; Welfare Fund Bill

Vaikunth Givind Desai (born 25 May 1942) is an Indian politician and teacher from Goa. He is a former member of the Goa Legislative Assembly representing the Quepem Assembly constituency from 1977 to 1989. He also served as a Deputy speaker from 1980 to 1985 in the Goa Legislative Assembly.

== Early life and education ==
Vaikunt Givind Desai was born at Sheldem, Quepem. He completed his fifth grade of Lyceum. Desai then completed his schooling from Infant Jesus High School, Cuncolim. He graduated from S.P.C. College, Margao. He further completed his Bachelor of Science from Nirmala Institute, Panaji and later received a Master of Education degree from Tilak College Of Education, Pune.
