= Ganba Desai =

Indian politician

- Official portrait in 1972

Member of Goa, Daman and Diu Legislative Assembly
- In office 1963–1967
- Preceded by: constituency established
- Succeeded by: Manju Naik Gaonkar
- Constituency: Canacona
- Majority: 5,854 (64.08%)
- In office 1972–1977
- Preceded by: Manju Naik Gaonkar
- Succeeded by: Vasu Gaonkar
- Constituency: Canacona
- Majority: 5,874 (55.37%)

Personal details
- Born: Ganba Bhagdu Desai Goa, Portuguese India
- Died: Unknown
- Party: Maharashtrawadi Gomantak Party (1963–1977)
- Occupation: Politician

Ganba Bhagdu Desai (Note: his first name, Ganba is also spelled as Ganaba according to) was an Indian politician. He was a former member of the Goa, Daman and Diu Legislative Assembly, representing the Canacona Assembly constituency from 1963 to 1967 and 1972 to 1977.

== Career ==
Desai had contested in the 1963 Goa, Daman and Diu Legislative Assembly election from the Canacona Assembly constituency on the Maharashtrawadi Gomantak Party (MGP) ticket and emerged victorious, he served from 1962 to 1967. He then successfully contested in the 1972 Goa, Daman and Diu Legislative Assembly election from the same consistency on the MGP ticket and defeated United Goans (Sequiera Group) candidate, P. D. Shrirang Padmanaba by a margin of 2,433 votes. He served for five years from 1972 to 1977. This marked Desai's last election participation in his political career.
