= Vishwas Satarkar =

Indian politician

Speaker of the Goa Legislative Assembly
- In office 12 Jun 2002 – 28 Feb 2005

Member of the Goa Legislative Assembly
- In office 1999–2007
- Preceded by: Kashinath Jalmi
- Succeeded by: Deepak Dhavalikar
- Constituency: Priol

Personal details
- Party: Bharatiya Janata Party
- Occupation: Politician

Vishwas Satarkar is an Indian politician and member of the Bharatiya Janata Party. He was a two term member of the Goa Legislative Assembly.

== Posts ==
Satarkar was elected Speaker of the Goa Legislative Assembly from 2002–2005.

== Constituency ==
He represented the Priol constituency of Goa.

== Goa Legislative Assembly ==
- Term 1999-2002 and 2002-2007.
