= Ranjita Rane =

Indian cricketer (1977–2021)

Personal information
- Born: 28 October 1977
- Died: 26 May 2021 (aged 43); Mumbai, Maharashtra, India
- Role: All-rounder

Domestic team information
- Years: Team
- 1995–2003: Mumbai cricket team

Ranjita Rane (28 October 1977 – 26 May 2021) was an Indian cricketer. She played 44 first-class cricket matches representing Mumbai from 1995 to 2003. She began her career at the Indian Gymkhana in Matunga before playing for Mumbai in first-class matches.

She died on 26 May 2021 after being diagnosed with cancer.
