= Vishwajit Rane =

Indian politician (born 1971)

- Rane in 2024

Minister of Health Government of Goa
- Incumbent
- Assumed office 12 April 2017
- Chief Minister: Manohar Parrikar; Pramod Sawant
- Preceded by: Francis D'Souza

Member of Goa Legislative Assembly
- Incumbent
- Assumed office 2007
- Preceded by: Narahari Haldankar
- Constituency: Valpoi

Minister of Health, Agriculture and Craftsmen Training Government of Goa
- In office 24 June 2010 – 3 March 2012
- Chief Minister: Digambar Kamat

Minister of Health, Agriculture & Craftsmen Training Government of Goa
- In office 25 June 2007 – 24 June 2010
- Chief Minister: Digambar Kamat

Personal details
- Born: Vishwajit Pratapsingh Rane; 23 March 1971 (age 55) Bombay, Maharashtra, India
- Party: Bharatiya Janata Party (since 2017)
- Other political affiliations: Indian National Congress (2007–2017)
- Spouse: Deviya Rane
- Parent: Pratapsingh Rane (father)
- Education: T. A. Pai Management Institute
- Website: Official website

Vishwajit Pratapsingh Rane (born 23 March 1971) is an Indian politician and a cabinet minister in the Government of Goa. The son of former Chief Minister of Goa Pratapsingh Rane, he previously served as the Minister of Health, Agriculture and Craftsmen Training in the Government of Goa led by Digambar Kamat from June 2007 to March 2012. He resigned as the MLA of the Valpoi Constituency and also from the Indian National Congress on 16 March 2017.

Rane later joined the Bharatiya Janata Party on 7 April 2017 and was sworn in as a Cabinet Minister on 12 April 2017 in the cabinet led by Manohar Parrikar. He was allotted the Health portfolio on 18 April 2017. In 2022, Rane won the assembly election on BJP ticket from Poriem. He made national headlines during his alleged involvement in the Rafale deal controversy when a recording was leaked of a close aide of Rane and Manohar Parrikar in which Parrikar stated that the Rafale deal files were in his bedroom. Rahul Gandhi tried to play the recording in the Lok Sabha, but was not allowed to.

== Early and personal life ==
Vishwajit Rane was born in Bombay, Maharashtra, India, to veteran politician Pratapsingh Rane and Vijayadevi Rane. He did his schooling in Panaji's People's High School. Vishwajit graduated from the Goa University with a Bachelor of Commerce degree and obtained a postgraduate diploma in Management Studies from the T. A. Pai Management Institute at Manipal. He represented Goa State in badminton. Rane is married to Dr. Deviya Timblo.

== Political career ==
Rane started his political career as a member of the Indian National Congress and also used the platform of his organisation named Sattari Yuva Morcha. In 2016, the organisation submitted an application to the Election Commission of India to be registered as a political party but Rane maintained that he had no role in the same. He established the Sattari Yuva Morcha and served as its president. He was also the Chairman of the Government of Goa's Goa Tourism Development Corporation. Rane was the General Secretary of the Goa Pradesh Congress Committee.

=== 2007 Assembly elections ===
Rane contested the 2007 Goa Legislative Assembly elections as an independent candidate. The Indian National Congress then had decided that it would not allot its candidature to more than one person from the same family. As a result, Pratapsingh Rane successfully contested as the Indian National Congress candidate in the 2007 Goa Legislative Assembly elections from the Poriem constituency while Vishwajit successfully contested as an independent from the neighbouring Valpoi constituency after resigning as the General Secretary of the Goa Pradesh Congress Committee and also from the party's primary membership.

=== Health, Agriculture and Craftsmen Training Minister ===
After the 2007 Legislative Goa Assembly elections, the Indian National Congress party led by Digambar Kamat formed a coalition government in Goa. Vishwajit was inducted as a Cabinet Minister in the Government led by Kamat. He was allocated the portfolios of Health, Agriculture and Craftsmen Training.

On 24 June 2010, Rane resigned as the independent MLA and also as a Cabinet Minister, to contest a by-election from Valpoi constituency as an Indian National Congress candidate. He joined the Indian National Congress and was sworn in again as the Cabinet Minister the same day. Rane successfully retained the Valpoi constituency in the by-election.

During his tenure as a Cabinet Minister, Vishwajit Rane expanded his influence in the Sattari and Bicholim talukas of Goa. After the demise of the Gurudas Gawas who was the Indian National Congress legislator from Pale constituency, Vishwajit played a key role in the election of the former's brother Pratap Gauns from the constituency in a bye-election. He also ensured the victory of several candidates backed by him.

=== 2012 Assembly elections ===
In the 2012 Goa Legislative Assembly elections, Vishwajit emerged victorious from Valpoi constituency as a candidate of the Indian National Congress.

=== 2017 Assembly elections and resignation from the Indian National Congress ===
Vishwajit Rane retained his Valpoi constituency as a candidate of the Indian National Congress in the 2017 Goa Legislative Assembly elections. But after the Indian National Congress could not form the government despite securing 17 seats in the 40-member Goa Legislative Assembly, Vishwajit Rane blamed the party leadership. He also wrote to Rahul Gandhi, the Vice President of the Indian National Congress, complaining about the indecisiveness of the party leaders like Digvijaya Singh (who was the Goa desk in-charge of the party) and threatening to resign from the party if no heed was paid to his grievances. While Chief Minister of Goa Manohar Parrikar proved his majority on the floor of the house on 16 March 2017, Vishwajit Rane remained absent during the voting in protest of the leaders of the Indian National Congress.

The same day, he resigned from the membership of the Indian National Congress and also as the MLA of Valpoi Constituency. On 7 April 2017, Rane joined the Bharatiya Janata Party and announced that he would contest a by-election in the Valpoi Constituency as a Bharatiya Janata Party candidate.

=== Cabinet Minister in the Manohar Parrikar-led government ===
Vishwajit Rane was sworn in as a Cabinet Minister on 12 April 2017 in the cabinet led by Manohar Parrikar. He was allotted the portfolio of Health. As the Health Minister in the third Manohar Parrikar Ministry, Rane took the decision of charging nominal fees in the Goa Medical College, Hospicio Hospital and the Asilo Hospital for the patients who are not residents of the state of Goa since 1 January 2018.

=== 2022 Goa Legislative Assembly Election ===
Vishwajit Rane retained his Valpoi constituency as a candidate of the Bharatiya Janata Party in the 2022 Goa Legislative Assembly elections. Deviya Rane his spouse also won the Porem Constituency election on the Bharatiya Janata Party ticket. Vishwajit and Deviya Rane are now spousal couple in Goa Legislative Assembly. The other spousal couples are Atanasio Monserrate and Jennifer Monserrate, and Michael Lobo and Delilah Lobo.

== Controversies ==
In 2019, Rane was involved in the Rafale deal controversy when Congress released an audio clip, purportedly of Rane, claiming that then-Chief Minister Manohar Parrikar held Rafale deal files in his bedroom, implying potential blackmail. Rane dismissed the clip as "doctored," denying any discussion on the Rafale deal and calling for a criminal investigation. He wrote to BJP President Amit Shah and Parrikar, reiterating the audio's inauthenticity. Congress persisted, alleging the clip exposed irregularities in the Rafale deal, but no conclusive evidence substantiated the claims.

In June 2025, Rane publicly reprimanded and ordered the suspension of the Chief Medical Officer at Goa Medical College and Hospital, after a complaint about the doctor's alleged mistreatment of a patient. A viral video showed Rane berating the doctor, prompting backlash from the Indian Medical Association and Goa Association of Resident Doctors, who demanded a fair inquiry and a public apology, threatening a strike. Opposition parties, including Congress and Aam Aadmi Party, criticized Rane's authoritarian approach, calling for his removal as the Health Minister. Rane defended his actions, prioritizing patient care but admitted his tone could have been more measured. Chief Minister Pramod Sawant then overruled the doctor's suspension.

Also in June 2025, Congress accused Rane of a "jobs-for-cash" scam involving fake appointment letters. Rane denied the allegations, challenging accusers to provide evidence and directing his departments to file complaints against forged documents.
