= Carlos Almeida (politician) =

Indian politician

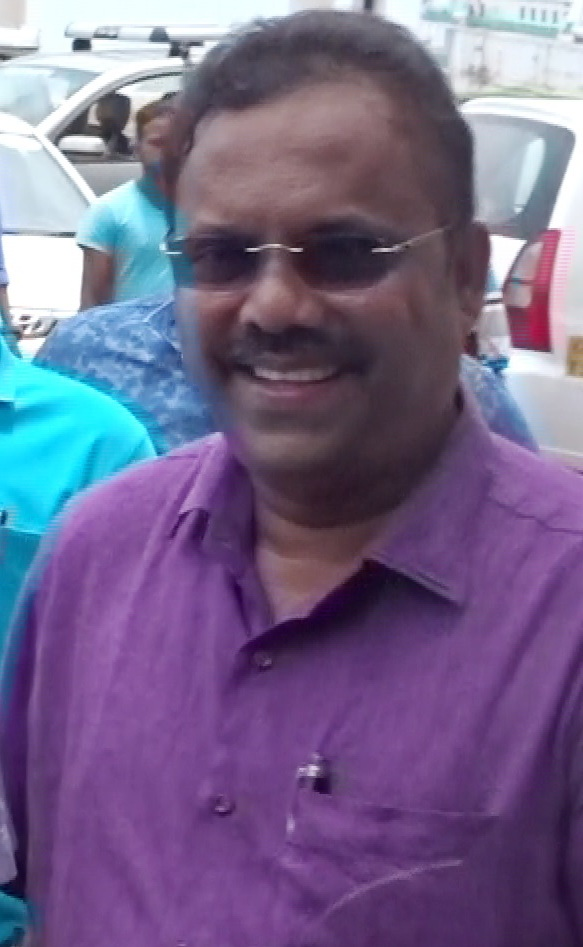
- Almeida in 2017

Member of the Goa Legislative Assembly
- In office 2012–2022
- Constituency: Vasco Da Gama

Personal details
- Born: November 4, 1963 (age 62)
- Party: Indian National Congress (2021–present)
- Other political affiliations: Bharatiya Janata Party (2012–2021)
- Occupation: Politician

Jose Luis Carlos Almeida, or simply Carlos Almeida, is an Indian politician from the state of Goa. He was a two term member of the Goa Legislative Assembly.

== Political party ==
He is a member of the Indian National Congress.

== Constituency ==
He had represented the Vasco Da Gama constituency from 2012 to 2021.

== Health issues ==
On 9 March 2018, Almeida suffered a stroke while in a bathroom. He was rushed to a hospital in Dona Paula for treatment.

== Posts ==
Chairman of Kadamba Transport Corporation Limited. He is also the Chairman of the Mormugao Planning and Development Authority (MPDA).

== Committees ==
Sixth Legislative Assembly 2012

- Chairman, Committee On Delegated Legislation
- Member, Library Committee
- Member, Select Committee on The Goa Commission for Minorities Bill, 2012
