= Canacona Assembly constituency =

Legislative Assembly constituency in Goa State, India

Coordinates: 15.00°N 74.05°E

Canacona
- Constituency No. 40 for the Goa Legislative Assembly

Constituency details
- Country: India
- Region: Western India
- State: Goa
- District: South Goa
- Lok Sabha constituency: South Goa
- Established: 1963
- Total electors: 34,246
- Reservation: None

Member of Legislative Assembly
- 8th Goa Legislative Assembly
- Incumbent Ramesh Tawadkar
- Party: Bhartiya Janta Party

Canacona Assembly constituency is one of the 40 Goa Legislative Assembly constituencies of the state of Goa in southern India. Canacona is also one of the 20 constituencies falling under South Goa Lok Sabha constituency.

== Members of Legislative Assembly ==
Year	Member	Party
1963	Ganba Desai	Maharashtrawadi Gomantak Party
1967	Manju Naik Gaonkar	Maharashtrawadi Gomantak Party
1972	Ganba Desai	Maharashtrawadi Gomantak Party
1977	Vasu Gaonkar	Maharashtrawadi Gomantak Party
1980	Vasu Gaonkar	Indian National Congress
1984	Vasu Gaonkar	Indian National Congress
1989	Sanjay Bandekar	Maharashtrawadi Gomantak Party
1994	Sanjay Bandekar	Indian National Congress
1999	Sanjay Bandekar	Indian National Congress
2002	Vijay Pai Khot	Bharatiya Janata Party
2007	Vijay Pai Khot	Bharatiya Janata Party
2012	Ramesh Tawadkar	Bharatiya Janata Party
2017	Isidore Fernandes	Indian National Congress
2022	Ramesh Tawadkar	Bharatiya Janata party

== Election results ==
=== 2027 Assembly election ===
2027 Goa Legislative Assembly election: Canacona
Party	Candidate	Votes	%	±%
INC				
NDA				
NOTA	None of the above			
Majority				
Turnout				
gain from		Swing		

=== Assembly Election 2022 ===
2022 Goa Legislative Assembly election : Canacona
Party	Candidate	Votes	%	±%
BJP	Ramesh Tawadkar	9,063	30.96	▲0.26
Independent	Isidore Fernandes	6,012	20.53	New
INC	Janardhan Bhandari	5,351	18.28	▼19.82
Independent	Vijay Pai Khot	4,791	16.36	New
RGP	Prashant Suresh Pagi	1,599	5.46	New
AITC	Mahadev Dessai	1,066	3.64	New
AAP	Anoop Balkrishna Kudtarkar	835	2.85	▲1.27
NOTA	None of the Above	296	1.01	▼0.05
Margin of victory		3,051	10.42	▲3.02
Turnout		29,277	84.20	▼0.23
Registered electors		34,246		▲3.05
BJP gain from INC		Swing	▼7.14	

=== Assembly Election 2017 ===
2017 Goa Legislative Assembly election : Canacona
Party	Candidate	Votes	%	±%
INC	Isidore Fernandes	10,853	38.10	▼5.62
BJP	Vijay Pai Khot	8,745	30.70	▼23.19
Independent	Ramesh Tawadkar	7,739	27.16	New
AAP	Sandesh Telekar	452	1.59	New
MGP	Gourish Bandekar	398	1.40	New
NOTA	None of the Above	302	1.06	New
Margin of victory		2,108	7.40	▼2.77
Turnout		28,489	85.73	▲2.17
Registered electors		33,233		▲4.43
INC gain from BJP		Swing	▼15.79	

=== Assembly Election 2012 ===
2012 Goa Legislative Assembly election : Canacona
Party	Candidate	Votes	%	±%
BJP	Ramesh Tawadkar	14,328	53.88	▲3.95
INC	Isidore Fernandes	11,624	43.72	▼1.55
AITC	Sapnesh Desai	637	2.40	New
Margin of victory		2,704	10.17	▲5.50
Turnout		26,590	83.56	▲7.96
Registered electors		31,822		▲58.56
BJP hold		Swing		

=== Assembly Election 2007 ===
2007 Goa Legislative Assembly election : Canacona
Party	Candidate	Votes	%	±%
BJP	Pai Khot Vijay	7,577	49.94	▼8.99
INC	Bandekar Sanjay Vimal	6,868	45.26	▲6.25
Save Goa Front	Gracias Hemant Bernardo	464	3.06	New
UGDP	Fernandes Augustin Lorence	245	1.61	New
Margin of victory		709	4.67	▼15.24
Turnout		15,173	75.51	▼3.05
Registered electors		20,070		▲9.03
BJP hold		Swing	▼8.99	

=== Assembly Election 2002 ===
2002 Goa Legislative Assembly election : Canacona
Party	Candidate	Votes	%	±%
BJP	Vijay Anandrao Pai Khot	8,531	58.92	▲22.93
INC	Sanjay Bandekar	5,648	39.01	▲1.70
MGP	Mohan Chanda Gayak	293	2.02	▼21.30
Margin of victory		2,883	19.91	▲18.60
Turnout		14,478	78.62	▲4.38
Registered electors		18,407		▲5.21
BJP gain from INC		Swing		

=== Assembly Election 1999 ===
1999 Goa Legislative Assembly election : Canacona
Party	Candidate	Votes	%	±%
INC	Bandekar Sanjay Vimal	4,849	37.31	▼14.47
BJP	Pai Khot Vijay Anandrao	4,678	36.00	New
MGP	Naik Gaonkar Chandrakant	3,031	23.32	New
GRCP	Ulhas Nilu Goankar	224	1.72	New
Independent	Fernandes Michel	194	1.49	New
Margin of victory		171	1.32	▼9.55
Turnout		12,995	74.17	▼2.69
Registered electors		17,496		▲12.86
INC hold		Swing	▼14.47	

=== Assembly Election 1994 ===
1994 Goa Legislative Assembly election : Canacona
Party	Candidate	Votes	%	±%
INC	Bandekar Sanjay Vimal	6,178	51.78	New
MGP	Dr. Shaba Naik Gaonkar	4,881	40.91	
UGDP	Velip Ghurko Bhisso	460	3.86	New
Independent	Fernandes Inacina	134	1.12	New
BSP	Komarpant Soiru Madhukar	96	0.80	New
Margin of victory		1,297	10.87	▼20.31
Turnout		11,931	75.79	▲2.45
Registered electors		15,503		▲8.16
INC gain from MGP		Swing	▼3.82	

=== Assembly Election 1989 ===
1989 Goa Legislative Assembly election : Canacona
Party	Candidate	Votes	%	±%
MGP	Bandekar Sanjay Vimal	5,938	55.60	New
Independent	Fernandes Joao Jose Joaquim S.	2,608	24.42	New
INC	Kankonkar Suresh Bhiku	1,897	17.76	
Margin of victory		3,330	31.18	▲11.07
Turnout		10,680	73.26	▼3.51
Registered electors		14,334		▼26.46
MGP gain from INC		Swing		

=== Assembly Election 1984 ===
1984 Goa, Daman and Diu Legislative Assembly election : Canacona
Party	Candidate	Votes	%	±%
INC	Gaonkar Vassu Paik	7,031	46.24	New
Independent	Kakodkar Shashikala Gurudutt	3,973	26.13	New
Independent	Kankonkar Suresh Bhiku	2,498	16.43	New
Independent	Fernandes Martino Menino	699	6.54	New
BJP	Dessai Prakash Shambha	289	2.71	New
MGP	Fal Desai Ulhas Shanta	174	1.63	New
Margin of victory		3,058	20.11	▼18.72
Turnout		15,207	75.48	▲2.75
Registered electors		19,492		▲11.62
INC gain from INC(U)		Swing	▼21.14	

=== Assembly Election 1980 ===
1980 Goa, Daman and Diu Legislative Assembly election : Canacona
Party	Candidate	Votes	%	±%
INC(U)	Gaonkar Vassu Paik	8,855	67.37	New
MGP	Namshikar Eknath Tukaram	3,752	28.55	
JP(S)	Phal Desai Sharad Datta	161	1.22	New
Margin of victory		5,103	38.83	▲16.43
Turnout		13,143	73.11	▲3.89
Registered electors		17,463		▲10.29
INC(U) gain from MGP		Swing	▲18.31	

=== Assembly Election 1977 ===
1977 Goa, Daman and Diu Legislative Assembly election : Canacona
Party	Candidate	Votes	%	±%
MGP	Gaonkar Vasu Paik	5,544	49.06	▼4.76
JP	Prabhu Gopal Venkatesh	3,013	26.66	New
INC	Fernandes Martinho Menino Nicolan	1,745	15.44	New
Independent	Gaonkar Jiva Bhagdo	619	5.48	New
Independent	Raikar Locximon Bapuji	124	1.10	New
Independent	Dessai Molu Krishnarao	78	0.69	New
Margin of victory		2,531	22.40	▲0.11
Turnout		11,300	70.25	▼1.64
Registered electors		15,833		▲5.92
MGP hold		Swing	▼4.76	

=== Assembly Election 1972 ===
1972 Goa, Daman and Diu Legislative Assembly election : Canacona
Party	Candidate	Votes	%	±%
MGP	Ganaba Bhagdu Desai	5,874	53.82	▼1.96
UGP	P. D. Shrirang Padmanaba	3,441	31.53	New
MGP	G. Monju Balkrishna Naik	1,294	11.86	
Margin of victory		2,433	22.29	▼10.19
Turnout		10,914	70.97	▲3.11
Registered electors		14,948		▲13.71
MGP hold		Swing	▼1.96	

=== Assembly Election 1967 ===
1967 Goa, Daman and Diu Legislative Assembly election : Canacona
Party	Candidate	Votes	%	±%
MGP	N. G. M. Balkrishna	5,126	55.78	New
UGP	M. R. Desai	2,141	23.30	New
Independent	D. J. Visnum	758	8.25	New
Independent	M. H. Kamat	410	4.46	New
Independent	H. R. Prabhu	126	1.37	New
Independent	N. B. Gaunkar	109	1.19	New
Margin of victory		2,985	32.48	
Turnout		9,190	66.15	
Registered electors		13,146		
MGP win (new seat)				

== See also ==
- Poinguinim (Vidhan Sabha constituency)
- List of constituencies of the Goa Legislative Assembly
- South Goa district
