= Poriem Assembly constituency =

Legislative Assembly constituency in Goa State, India

Coordinates: 15.59°N 74.03°E

Poriem
- Constituency No. 18 for the Goa Legislative Assembly

Constituency details
- Country: India
- Region: Western India
- State: Goa
- District: North Goa
- Lok Sabha constituency: North Goa
- Established: 1989
- Total electors: 32,985
- Reservation: None

Member of Legislative Assembly
- 8th Goa Legislative Assembly
- Incumbent Deviya Vishwajit Rane
- Party: Bharatiya Janata Party

Poriem Assembly constituency is one of the 40 Goa Legislative Assembly constituencies of the state of Goa in southern India. Poriem is also one of the 20 constituencies falling under North Goa Lok Sabha constituency.

== Members of Legislative Assembly ==
Year	Member	Party
1989	Pratapsingh Rane	Indian National Congress
1994	Pratapsingh Rane	Indian National Congress
1999	Pratapsingh Rane	Indian National Congress
2002	Pratapsingh Rane	Indian National Congress
2007	Pratapsingh Rane	Indian National Congress
2012	Pratapsingh Rane	Indian National Congress
2017	Pratapsingh Rane	Indian National Congress
2022	Deviya Vishwajit Rane	Bharatiya Janata Party

== Election results ==
=== 2027 Assembly election ===
2027 Goa Legislative Assembly election: Poriem
Party	Candidate	Votes	%	±%
INC				
NDA				
NOTA	None of the above			
Majority				
Turnout				
gain from		Swing		

=== Assembly Election 2022 ===
2022 Goa Legislative Assembly election : Poriem
Party	Candidate	Votes	%	±%
BJP	Deviya Rane	17,816	60.79	▲21.25
AAP	Vishwajit Krishnarao Rane	3,873	13.22	▲11.75
RGP	Sameer Satarkar	3,513	11.99	New
AITC	Ganpat Gaonkar	1,500	5.12	New
INC	Ranjit Jayasingrao Rane	1,488	5.08	▼49.20
NOTA	None of the Above	542	1.85	▼0.15
Margin of victory		13,943	47.58	▲32.84
Turnout		29,307	87.02	▼1.06
Registered electors		32,985		▲7.46
BJP gain from INC		Swing	▲6.52	

=== Assembly Election 2017 ===
2017 Goa Legislative Assembly election : Poriem
Party	Candidate	Votes	%	±%
INC	Pratapsingh Rane	14,977	54.27	▼0.55
BJP	Vishwajit Krishnarao Rane	10,911	39.54	▼5.15
NOTA	None of the Above	552	2.00	New
MGP	Suhas Gajanan Naik	469	1.70	New
AAP	Sitaram Anant Gawas	403	1.46	New
Independent	Ajit Sadanand Mhalshekar	284	1.03	New
Margin of victory		4,066	14.73	▲4.59
Turnout		27,596	89.91	▼0.39
Registered electors		30,694		▲10.33
INC hold		Swing	▼0.55	

=== Assembly Election 2012 ===
2012 Goa Legislative Assembly election : Poriem
Party	Candidate	Votes	%	±%
INC	Pratapsingh Rane	13,772	54.82	▼3.30
BJP	Vishwajit Krishnarao Rane	11,225	44.69	▲7.04
Margin of victory		2,547	10.14	▼10.34
Turnout		25,120	89.85	▲11.82
Registered electors		27,820		▲19.65
INC hold		Swing		

=== Assembly Election 2007 ===
2007 Goa Legislative Assembly election : Poriem
Party	Candidate	Votes	%	±%
INC	Pratapsingh Rane	10,605	58.12	▲2.40
BJP	Vassudeo Ramnath Parab	6,869	37.65	▼2.39
MGP	Rane Rajendra Narayanrao	648	3.55	▼0.58
Margin of victory		3,736	20.48	▲4.79
Turnout		18,246	77.94	▲1.28
Registered electors		23,251		▲9.59
INC hold		Swing		

=== Assembly Election 2002 ===
2002 Goa Legislative Assembly election : Poriem
Party	Candidate	Votes	%	±%
INC	Pratapsingh Rane	9,126	55.72	▲2.79
BJP	Santoba Krishnarao Dessai	6,557	40.04	▲20.34
MGP	Gaonkar Kanta Shamba	677	4.13	▼18.80
Margin of victory		2,569	15.69	▼14.32
Turnout		16,378	77.11	▲2.57
Registered electors		21,217		▲6.55
INC hold		Swing		

=== Assembly Election 1999 ===
1999 Goa Legislative Assembly election : Poriem
Party	Candidate	Votes	%	±%
INC	Pratapsingh Rane	7,865	52.93	▲3.28
MGP	Santoba Krishnarao Dessai	3,407	22.93	New
BJP	Rane Sardesai Dipaji Hirabarao	2,927	19.70	New
CPI	Gonsalves Vincent Dioga	659	4.44	New
Margin of victory		4,458	30.00	▲20.25
Turnout		14,859	74.62	▼6.32
Registered electors		19,912		▲10.10
INC hold		Swing	▲3.28	

=== Assembly Election 1994 ===
1994 Goa Legislative Assembly election : Poriem
Party	Candidate	Votes	%	±%
INC	Pratapsingh Rane	7,268	49.65	▼6.08
MGP	Rane Krishnarao Appasaheb	5,840	39.89	New
CPI	Vincy Gonsalves	517	3.53	New
Independent	Gawas Tarak Rama	357	2.44	New
JD	Rane Jaisingrao Venkatrao	289	1.97	New
Margin of victory		1,428	9.75	▼6.47
Turnout		14,639	78.91	▲0.68
Registered electors		18,085		▲11.87
INC hold		Swing	▼6.08	

=== Assembly Election 1989 ===
1989 Goa Legislative Assembly election : Poriem
Party	Candidate	Votes	%	±%
INC	Pratapsingh Rane	7,231	55.73	New
MGP	Rane Krishnarao Appasaheb	5,126	39.51	New
Gomantak Bahujan Samaj Parishad	Gawas Sundare Ramchandra	113	0.87	New
Margin of victory		2,105	16.22	
Turnout		12,975	77.14	
Registered electors		16,166		
INC win (new seat)				

== See also ==
- List of constituencies of the Goa Legislative Assembly
- North Goa district
