= Vasco Da Gama Assembly constituency =

Legislative Assembly constituency in Goa State, India

Coordinates: 15.4°N 73.82°E

Vasco Da Gama
- Constituency No. 25 for the Goa Legislative Assembly

Constituency details
- Country: India
- Region: Western India
- State: Goa
- District: South Goa
- Lok Sabha constituency: South Goa
- Established: 1989
- Total electors: 35,613
- Reservation: None

Member of Legislative Assembly
- 8th Goa Legislative Assembly
- Incumbent Krishna Salkar
- Party: Bharatiya Janata Party

Vasco Da Gama Assembly constituency is one of the 40 (Legislative Assembly) constituencies of Goa state in South India. This constituency came into existence in 1989. It is also the most populated constituency of Goa.

== Overview ==
Vasco Da Gama (constituency number 25) is one of the 20 Vidhan Sabha constituencies located in South Goa district. This constituency covers the Mormugao (MCL) - Ward Nos. 9 to 17 of Mormugao Saza in Mormugao Taluka. Vasco Da Gama is part of South Goa (Lok Sabha constituency) along with eight other Vidhan Sabha segments covers the entire South Goa district.

== Members of Legislative Assembly ==
Year	Member	Party
1989	Simon Peter D'Souza	Indian National Congress
1994	Menezes Wilfred Mesquita	Maharashtrawadi Gomantak Party
1999	Jose Philip D'Souza	United Goans Party
2002	Rajendra Arlekar	Bharatiya Janata Party
2007	Jose Philip D'Souza	Nationalist Congress Party
2012	Carlos Almeida	Bharatiya Janata Party
2017	Carlos Almeida	Bharatiya Janata Party
2022	Krishna Salkar	Bharatiya Janata Party

== Election results ==
=== 2027 Assembly election ===
2027 Goa Legislative Assembly election: Vasco Da Gama
Party	Candidate	Votes	%	±%
INC				
NDA				
NOTA	None of the above			
Majority				
Turnout				
gain from		Swing		

=== Assembly Election 2022 ===
2022 Goa Legislative Assembly election : Vasco Da Gama
Party	Candidate	Votes	%	±%
BJP	Krishna Salkar	13,118	51.43%	▲17.85
INC	Carlos Almeida	9,461	37.09%	▲22.77
AITC	Saifula Khan	860	3.37%	New
RGP	Andre Sebastiao Viegas	851	3.34%	New
AAP	Sunil Loran	784	3.07%	▼0.48
NOTA	None of the Above	244	0.96%	▼0.05
Margin of victory		3,657	14.34%	▲9.16
Turnout		25,506	71.74%	▼0.88
Registered electors		35,552		▼1.07
BJP hold		Swing	▲17.85	

=== Assembly Election 2017 ===
2017 Goa Legislative Assembly election : Vasco Da Gama
Party	Candidate	Votes	%	±%
BJP	Carlos Almeida	8,765	33.58%	▼19.11
Independent	Krishna (Daji) V Salkar	7,414	28.41%	New
NCP	Jose Filipe De Sousa	4,202	16.10%	▼15.96
INC	Saifula Khan	3,737	14.32%	New
AAP	Loretta D'Souza	928	3.56%	New
MGP	Manesh Chandrakant Arolkar	654	2.51%	New
NOTA	None of the Above	263	1.01%	New
Margin of victory		1,351	5.18%	▼15.45
Turnout		26,099	72.62%	▼3.99
Registered electors		35,938		▲26.49
BJP hold		Swing	▼19.11	

=== Assembly Election 2012 ===
2012 Goa Legislative Assembly election : Vasco Da Gama
Party	Candidate	Votes	%	±%
BJP	Carlos Almeida	11,468	52.69%	▲16.79
NCP	Jose Philip D'Souza	6,978	32.06%	▼7.04
Independent	G. Karl Vaz	1,394	6.40%	New
Goa Vikas Party	Mohammed Iqbal Shaikh	600	2.76%	New
UGDP	Adam Abdulla Jumma	489	2.25%	▼1.03
AITC	Amindin Mulla	328	1.51%	New
Independent	Stanley C. Almeida	143	0.66%	New
Margin of victory		4,490	20.63%	▲17.43
Turnout		21,765	76.56%	▲17.85
Registered electors		28,411		▼12.69
BJP gain from NCP		Swing	▲13.59	

=== Assembly Election 2007 ===
2007 Goa Legislative Assembly election : Vasco Da Gama
Party	Candidate	Votes	%	±%
NCP	Jose Philip D'Souza	7,476	39.10%	▲10.47
BJP	Rajendra Arlekar	6,864	35.90%	▲0.31
JD(S)	Carlos J. L. Almeida	3,054	15.97%	New
UGDP	Rego Basilio Arnaldo	626	3.27%	New
MGP	Servulo Barros	279	1.46%	▼7.19
Independent	Dhargawe Manisha	253	1.32%	New
Save Goa Front	Milton Barreto	239	1.25%	New
Margin of victory		612	3.20%	▼3.76
Turnout		19,121	58.63%	▲2.52
Registered electors		32,541		▲16.19
NCP gain from BJP		Swing	▲3.51	

=== Assembly Election 2002 ===
2002 Goa Legislative Assembly election : Vasco Da Gama
Party	Candidate	Votes	%	±%
BJP	Rajendra Arlekar	5,605	35.59%	▲11.25
NCP	Jose Philip D'Souza	4,509	28.63%	New
INC	Carol Taher Daud	3,845	24.41%	▲4.69
MGP	Verenkar Shricant Dattaram	1,363	8.65%	▼4.22
Independent	Kerkar Tara	294	1.87%	New
CPI(M)	Pereira Thalmann Pradeep	130	0.83%	New
Margin of victory		1,096	6.96%	▼1.81
Turnout		15,750	56.22%	▲4.34
Registered electors		28,007		▼15.46
BJP gain from UGDP		Swing	▲2.48	

=== Assembly Election 1999 ===
1999 Goa Legislative Assembly election : Vasco Da Gama
Party	Candidate	Votes	%	±%
UGDP	Jose Philip D'Souza	5,691	33.10%	New
BJP	Rajendra Arlekar	4,183	24.33%	New
INC	Dr. Mesquita Wilfred M.	3,391	19.73%	New
MGP	Verenkar Shrikant Dattaram	2,213	12.87%	▼24.60
Independent	Simon D Souza	1,431	8.32%	New
Independent	Kashinath Ramdular Yadav	279	1.62%	New
Margin of victory		1,508	8.77%	▼0.47
Turnout		17,191	51.89%	▼9.84
Registered electors		33,127		▲18.65
UGDP gain from MGP		Swing	▼4.37	

=== Assembly Election 1994 ===
1994 Goa Legislative Assembly election : Vasco Da Gama
Party	Candidate	Votes	%	±%
MGP	Mesouita Menezes Wilfred M.	6,460	37.48%	New
INC	Simon Peter D'Souza	4,867	28.24%	
Independent	Jose Philip D'Souza	4,558	26.44%	New
UGDP	Henriques Gandhi E.	350	2.03%	New
Independent	Anil G. Chopdekar	161	0.93%	New
Independent	Barreto Geraldo Francis	160	0.93%	New
BSP	Suryawanshi Bhanudas Y.	159	0.92%	New
Margin of victory		1,593	9.24%	▲6.92
Turnout		17,237	60.50%	▼0.48
Registered electors		27,921		▲24.10
MGP gain from INC		Swing	▲1.43	

=== Assembly Election 1989 ===
1989 Goa Legislative Assembly election : Vasco Da Gama
Party	Candidate	Votes	%	±%
INC	Simon Peter D'Souza	5,045	36.05%	New
MGP	Menezas Mesquita Wilfred	4,720	33.72%	New
Independent	Jose Philip D'Souza	2,705	19.33%	New
Independent	Tiwari Dayaprasad Shiram	705	5.04%	New
BJP	Lotlikar Shivram Raghuvir	165	1.18%	New
Independent	Henlikar Gandhi	154	1.10%	New
JD	Parulikar Prakash Dattaram	109	0.78%	New
Margin of victory		325	2.32%	
Turnout		13,996	60.75%	
Registered electors		22,498		
INC win (new seat)				

== See also ==
- Vasco Da Gama
- South Goa (Lok Sabha constituency)
- List of constituencies of the Goa Legislative Assembly
- South Goa district
