= Government of Goa =

Indian State Government

Government of Goa Gōyānchen sarakāra
- Seat of Government: Goa Legislative Assembly Building, Panaji
- Website: www.goa.gov.in

Legislative branch
- Assembly: Goa Legislative Assembly
- Speaker: Ganesh Gaonkar, BJP
- Deputy Speaker: Joshua De Souza, BJP
- Members in Assembly: 40

Executive branch
- Governor: Pusapati Ashok Gajapathi Raju
- Chief Minister: Pramod Sawant, BJP
- Chief Secretary: Dr. V. Candavelou IAS

Judiciary branch
- High Court: Bombay High Court
- Chief Justice: Shree Chandrashekhar

The Government of Goa is a state government created by the Constitution of India and has executive, legislative and judicial authority of the state of Goa. It is headquartered in Panaji, the capital city of Goa.

== History ==
The governor's is largely a ceremonial post but has a crucial role when it comes to deciding who should form the next government or suspending the legislature as has happened in the recent past. While the state has seen stable governance for nearly thirty years up to 1990, Goa has also experienced political instability, with fourteen governments in the span of the fifteen years between 1990 and 2005. In March 2005, the assembly was dissolved by the governor and President's rule was declared, which suspended the legislature. A by-election in June 2005 saw the Congress coming back to power after winning three of the five seats that went to the polls. The Indian National Congress (INC) and the Bharatiya Janata Party (BJP) are the two largest parties in the state. In the assembly poll of 2007, a Congress-led coalition won and started ruling the state. Other parties include the United Goans Democratic Party, the Nationalist Congress Party and the Maharashtrawadi Gomantak Party.

In the 2012 election, the Bharatiya Janata Party (BJP) defeated the Indian National Congress government in Goa, led by CM Digambar Kamat. The election was won by the BJP-Maharashtrawadi Gomantak alliance which won 24 seats in the 40-seat assembly. The Bharatiya Janata Party won 21 seats, while the Maharashtrawadi Gomantak Party won 3 seats. Manohar Parrikar, leader of the BJP, was sworn in as Chief Minister of Goa on 9 March 2012. After Parrikar died from cancer in March 2019, he was succeeded by Pramod Sawant as the CM.

== Head Leaders ==
House	Leader	Portrait	Since
Constitutional Posts
Governor	Pusapati Ashok Gajapathi Raju		26 July 2025
Chief Minister	Pramod Sawant		19 March 2019
Speaker	Ganesh Gaonkar		25 September 2025
Deputy Speaker	Joshua D'Souza		22 July 2022
Leader of the House	Pramod Sawant		19 March 2019
Leader of the Opposition	Yuri Alemao		30 September 2022
Chief Justice	Alok Aradhe		21 January 2025
Chief Secretary	Dr. V. Candaveolu		NA

== Executive branches ==
=== Goa Council of Ministers ===
Portfolio	Minister	Took office	Left office	Party	Ref
Chief Minister; Home; Finance; Vigilance; Official Languages; Personnel; RDA; Other departments not allocated to any Minister	Pramod Sawant	28 March 2022	Incumbent	BJP	
Health; Urban Development; TCP; Women & Child; Forest	Vishwajit Pratapsingh Rane	28 March 2022	Incumbent	BJP	
WRD; Co-operation; Provedoria	Subhash Shirodkar	28 March 2022	Incumbent	BJP	
Transport; Industries; Panchayat; Protocol	Mauvin Godinho	28 March 2022	Incumbent	BJP	
Tourism; IT; Printing & Stationery	Rohan Khaunte	28 March 2022	Incumbent	BJP	
Revenue; Labour & Employment; Waste Management	Atanasio Monserrate	28 March 2022	Incumbent	BJP	
Social Welfare; River Navigation; Drinking Water; Empowering People with Disabilities	Subhash Phal Desai	9 April 2022	Incumbent	BJP	
Power; New and Renewable Energy; Museum	Sudin Dhavalikar	9 April 2022	Incumbent	MGP	
Fisheries; Animal Husbandry & Veterinary Services; Factories and Boilers	Nilkanth Halarnkar	9 April 2022	Incumbent	BJP	
Public Works Department; Captain of Ports; Legal Metrology	Digambar Kamat	21 August 2025	Incumbent	BJP	
Art & Culture; Sports & Youth Affairs; Tribal Welfare	Ramesh Tawadkar	21 August 2025	Incumbent	BJP	
TBD	Sankalp Amonkar	7 November 2026	Incumbent	BJP	

== Administrative and Political divisions ==
=== Administrative ===
- Districts of Goa
- Talukas of Goa
- List of cities and towns in Goa

=== Political ===
- List of constituencies of Goa Legislative Assembly
- North Goa (Lok Sabha constituency)
- South Goa (Lok Sabha constituency)

== State insignias ==
Symbols of Goa
- Language: Konkani
- Bird: Ruby Throated Yellow Bulbul
- Fish: Grey mullet
- Flower: Frangipani
- Fruit: Cashew
- Mammal: Gaur
- Tree: Matti

== See also ==
- Pramod Sawant ministry
- Third Parrikar ministry
- Parsekar ministry
- Second Parrikar ministry
- Kamat ministry
- Fifth Pratapsingh Rane ministry
- First Parrikar ministry
- Sardinha ministry
