= Prakash Velip =

Indian politician

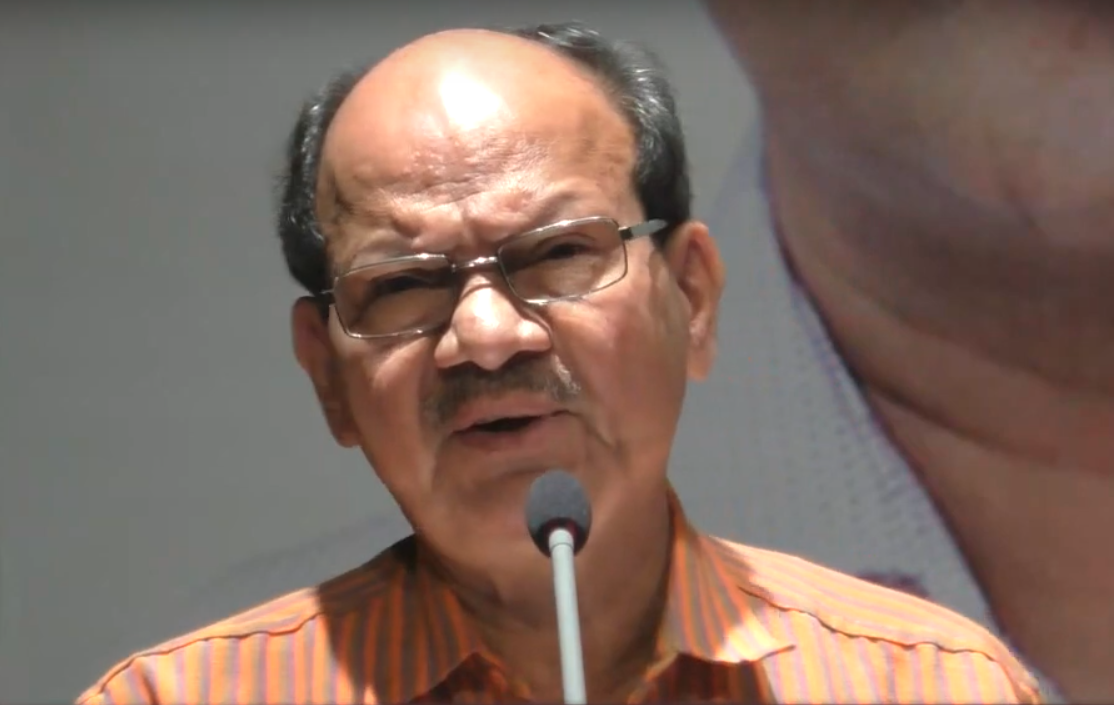
- Velip in 2023

Member of the Goa Assembly for Quepem
- In office 1989–2002
- Preceded by: Vaikunth Desai
- Succeeded by: Chandrakant Kavlekar

Personal details
- Political party: Maharashtrawadi Gomantak Party (1989–2002)

Prakash Velip is an Indian politician and member of the Bharatiya Janata Party. Velip was a member of the Goa Legislative Assembly in 1989 from the Quepem Assembly constituency in South Goa district as a member of the Maharashtrawadi Gomantak Party.
