= Isidore Fernandes (politician) =

Indian politician

Deputy Speaker of the Goa Legislative Assembly
- In office 24 May 2019 – 21 January 2022
- Preceded by: Michael Lobo
- Succeeded by: Subhash Phal Desai
- Constituency: Canacona

Member of Goa Legislative Assembly
- In office 2017–2022
- Preceded by: Ramesh Tawadkar
- Succeeded by: Ramesh Tawadkar
- Constituency: Canacona

Personal details
- Born: Isidore Aleixinho Fernandes; 4 April 1951 (age 75) Canacona, Goa, Portuguese India
- Party: Goa Forward Party
- Other political affiliations: Indian National Congress, Bharatiya Janata Party
- Education: Dhempe College of Arts and Science (B.A.)
- Profession: Businessperson

Isidore Aleixinho Fernandes (born 4 April 1951), is an Indian politician who was elected to the Goa Legislative Assembly from Canacona in the 2017 Goa Legislative Assembly election as a member of the Indian National Congress. He was one of the ten members of Indian National Congress who joined Bharatiya Janata Party in July 2019. He is currently an independent politician.
