= Deepak Dhavalikar =

Indian politician

President of Maharashtrawadi Gomantak Party
- Incumbent
- Assumed office 2007

Member of the Goa Legislative Assembly
- In office 2007 – March 2017
- Preceded by: Vishwas Satarkar
- Succeeded by: Govind Gaude
- Constituency: Priol

Personal details
- Born: Pandurang alias Deepak Dhavalikar; 14 May 1958 (age 68) Bandora, Goa, Portuguese India
- Citizenship: Portuguese (until 1961); Indian (from 1961)
- Party: Maharashtrawadi Gomantak Party
- Relatives: Sudin Dhavalikar (brother)
- Occupation: Politician

Pandurang alias Deepak Dhavalikar (born 14 May 1958) is an Indian politician who is a former two-term member of the Goa Legislative Assembly. He represented the Priol constituency from 2007 to 2017. Dhavalikar serves as the president of the Maharashtrawadi Gomantak Party (MGP) and has played key role in keeping the party alive in Goan politics. He was a cabinet minister in the Government of Goa for the period 2012–2016.

Dhavalikar is from the Maharashtrawadi Gomantak Party, Goa's first ruling party after the end of Portuguese rule in 1961. He was sacked from the Laxmikant Parsekar led government in Goa in December 2016.
