= Kashinath Jalmi =

Indian politician (1950–2012)

Kashinath Govind Jalmi
- Jalmi in 2010
- Born: 13 July 1950; Marcel, Goa, Portuguese India, Portuguese Empire (now in India)
- Died: 22 July 2012 (aged 62); Goa Medical College, Bambolim, Goa, India
- Spouse: Vidya Jalmi
- Children: 1

Kashinath Govind Jalmi (13 July 1950 – 22 July 2012) was an Indian politician. Born to a poor family he had to struggle a lot in order to complete his education. He completed MBBS from Bombay University and was the first doctor from Gaud Maratha Samaj community formerly a part of Gauda and Kunbi community.
