= Jose Philip D'Souza =

Indian politician

Personal details
- Party: Nationalist Congress Party

Jose Philip D'Souza is an Indian politician and member of the Nationalist Congress Party. He served as a member of the Goa Legislative Assembly from the Vasco constituency from 1999 to 2002.
