= Ramesh Tawadkar =

Indian politician

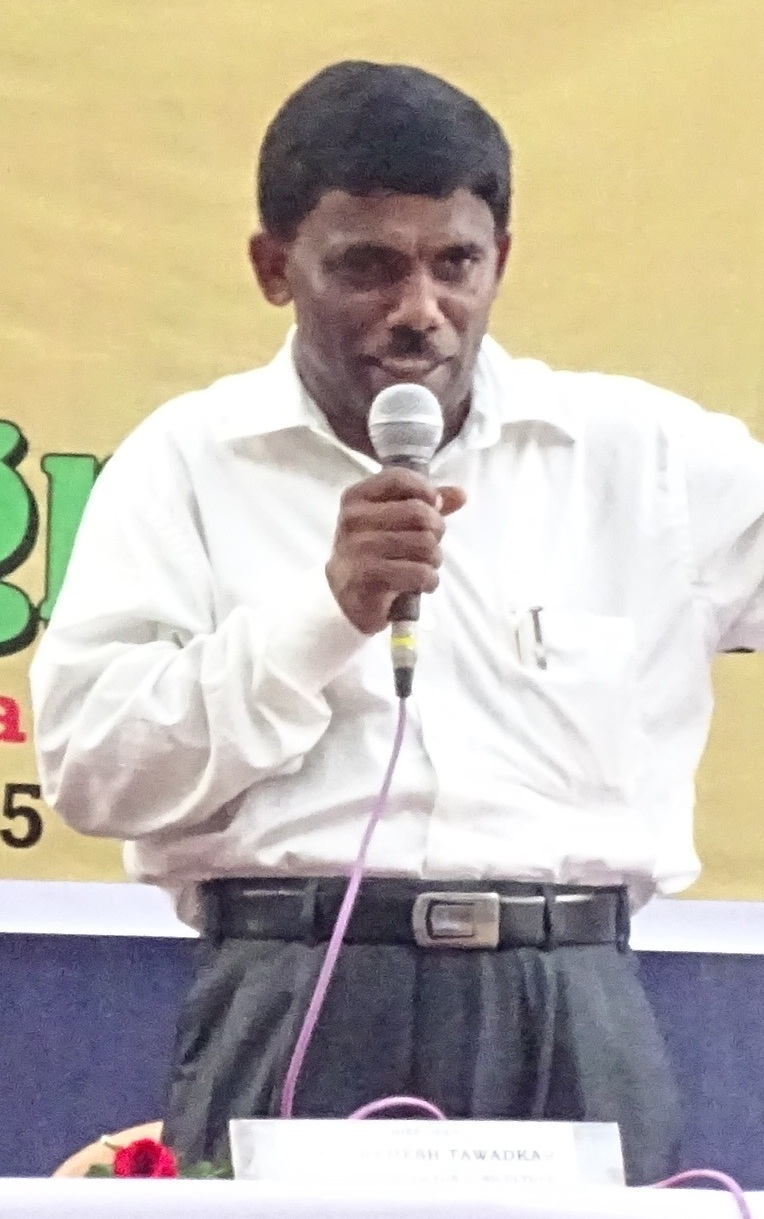
- Tawadkar in 2015

Speaker of the Goa Legislative Assembly
- In office 29 March 2022 – 21 August 2025
- Leader of the House: Pramod Sawant
- Preceded by: Rajesh Patnekar
- Succeeded by: Ganesh Gaonkar (Pro-Tem)

Cabinet Minister of Art and Culture Tribal Welfare Sports & Youth Affairs in the Goa Government
- Incumbent
- Assumed office 22 August 2025

Member of the Goa Legislative Assembly
- Incumbent
- Assumed office 10 March 2022
- Preceded by: Isidore Fernandes
- Constituency: Canacona
- In office 2012–2017
- Preceded by: Vijay Pai Khot
- Succeeded by: Isidore Fernandes
- Constituency: Canacona
- In office 2007–2012
- Succeeded by: Constituency demolished
- Constituency: Poinguinim
- In office 2005 (By-poll) – 2007
- Preceded by: Isidore Fernandes
- Constituency: Poinguinim

Cabinet Minister of Agriculture Animal Husbandry & Veterinary Servicesin the Goa Government
- In office 2012–2017

Personal details
- Party: Bharatiya Janata Party
- Occupation: Politician
- Profession: Politician

Ramesh Tawadkar is an Indian politician who served as a member of the Goa Legislative Assembly, representing the Canacona constituency. He is a member of the Bharatiya Janata Party. He is currently serving as the Minister of Art & Culture, Sports & Youth Affairs, Tribal Welfare of Goa.

== Ministry ==
He was a minister in the Laxmikant Parsekar-led government in Goa. While serving as sports and youth minister of Goa, Tawadkar was criticized in 2015 for remarks he made about the LGBT community.

== Portfolios ==
He is in charge of

- Agriculture
- Animal Husbandry and Veterinary Services.
- Tribal Welfare
- Sports and Youth Affairs.
