= Political Parties in Goa =

Political parties based in Goa

The political parties based in Indian state of Goa

== Recognised Parties ==
Sl No	Party name	Status	Seats in GLA
1.	Bharatiya Janata party (BJP)	National Party	28/40
2.	Indian National Congress (INC)	National Party	3/40
3.	Aam Aadmi Party (AAP)	National Party	2/40
4.	All India Trinamool Congress (AITC)	National Party	0/40
5.	Nationalist Congress Party (NCP)	National Party	0/40
6.	Maharashtrawadi Gomantak Party (MGP)	State Party	2/40
7.	Goa Forward Party (GFP)	State Party	1/40
8.	Revolutionary Goans Party (RGP)	State Party	1/40

== Registered Unrecognised Parties ==
- United Goans Party
- United Goans Democratic Party (UGDP) led by Jorson Fernandes
- Goa Suraksha Manch (GSM) led by Subhash Velingkar and Anand Shirodkar
- Goa Praja Party (GPP) led by Pandurang Raut
- Goa Su-Raj Party (GSRP) led by Mathias Xavier Vaz
- Goa Vikas Party (GVP) led by Lyndon Monteiro
- Niz Goenkar Revolution Front (NGRF)
- Social Democratic Party of India (SDPI) led by Shahid Shaikh
- Goa Nationalist Party
- Goemcarancho Otrec Asro
- Sattari Yuva Morcha

== Defunct Regional Parties ==
- United Goans Party (Sequiera Group), led by Late Dr. Jack de Sequeira
- United Goans Party (Furtado Group), led by Late Alvaro de Loyola Furtado
- United Goans Party (Naik Group), led by Late Babu Naik
- United Goans Party (Monserratte Group), led by Babush Monserrate (merged with Bharatiya Janata Party)
- Frente Popular, led by Late Berta de Menezes Bragança
- Partido Indiano
- Gomant Lok Pokx, led by Late Mathany Saldanha
- Goa Democratic Front (GDF) led by Dayanand Narvekar (merged with Aam Admi Party).
- Goa Rajiv Congress Party, led by Late Wilfred de Souza
- Goa People's Congress, led by Francisco Sardinha
- Save Goa Front, led by Churchill Alemao
- Indian National Congress (Sheik Hassan), led by Sheikh Hassan Haroon (merged with Bharatiya Janata Party)
- Goa Congress (1984), led by Late Wilfred de Souza
- Goa People's Party, led by Late Luis Proto Barbosa
- United Front of Goans
