= Suresh Amonkar =

Indian politician (1952–2020)

Suresh Kuso Amonkar

Member of the Goa Legislative Assembly
- In office 1999–2007
- Preceded by: Malik Sadanand Uttam
- Succeeded by: Gurudas Gauns
- Constituency: Pale

Personal details
- Born: 15 May 1952 Amona, Goa, Portuguese India
- Died: 6 July 2020 (aged 68) Panaji, Goa, India
- Party: Goa Suraksha Manch
- Other political affiliations: Bharatiya Janata Party
- Education: M.B.B.S.
- Alma mater: Goa Medical College
- Profession: Medical Practitioner

Suresh Kuso Amonkar (15 May 1952 – 6 July 2020) was an Indian politician and medical practitioner.

== Career ==
Amonkar was elected to the Goa Legislative Assembly from Pale in the 1999 and 2002 Goa Legislative Assembly election as a member of the Bharatiya Janata Party. He was Minister of Health, Social Welfare, and Labour & Employment in Francisco Sardinha cabinet from 1999 to 2000 then Minister of Health, Labour & Employment, and Factories and Boilers in First Manohar Parrikar cabinet.

Amonkar lost the 2007 Goa Legislative Assembly election to the Congress Candidate Gurudas Gauns, he ran as an independent candidate in 2008 By-Election after Gurudas Gawas death as the party had allotted the ticket to youth leader Pramod Sawant and he lost the election to Gurudas Gawas brother Pratap Prabhakar Gauns. He joined rebel RSS leaders Subhash Velingkar's Goa Suraksha Manch in November 2016 and was allotted Sanquelim seat in the 2017 Goa Legislative Assembly election where he received 3,831 votes and came third.

== Death ==
Amonkar died from COVID-19 during the COVID-19 pandemic in India on 6 July 2020.
