= Shashikala Kakodkar =

Indian politician (1935–2016)

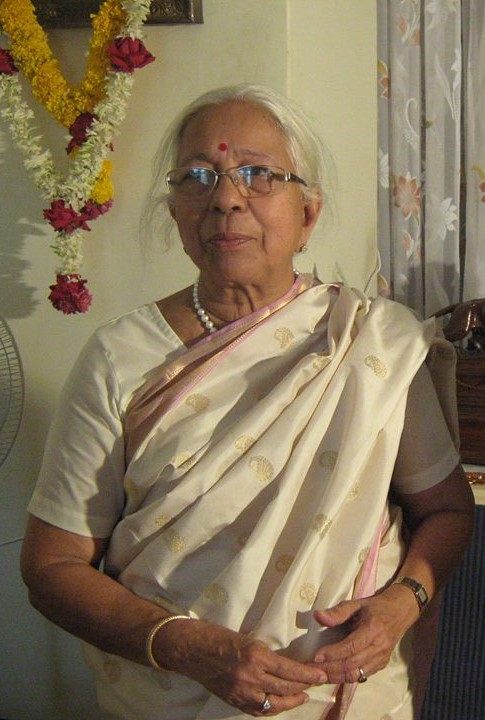
- Kakodkar in 2011

2nd Chief Minister of Goa, Daman and Diu
- In office 12 August 1973 – 27 April 1979
- Preceded by: Dayanand Bandodkar
- Succeeded by: President's rule

Member of the Goa Legislative Assembly
- In office 1967–1972
- Preceded by: Gajanan Raikar
- Succeeded by: Rhoidas Naik
- Constituency: Ponda
- In office 1972–1980
- Preceded by: C.D. Keshav
- Succeeded by: Harish Zantye
- Constituency: Bicholim
- In office 1989–1999
- Preceded by: constituency established
- Succeeded by: Prakash Fadte
- Constituency: Maem

Personal details
- Born: 7 January 1935 Pernem, Goa, Portuguese India
- Died: 28 October 2016 (aged 81) Panaji, Goa, India
- Party: Maharashtrawadi Gomantak Party
- Spouse: Gurudatt Kakodkar (m. 1963)
- Children: 3
- Parent: Dayanand Bandodkar (father)
- Relatives: Leena Chandavarkar (sister-in-law)
- Education: Karnatak University (B.A.); Elphinstone College (M.A.)

Shashikala Kakodkar (7 January 1935 – 28 October 2016), also known as Tai (lit. 'elder sister'), was an Indian politician and a leader of the Maharashtrawadi Gomantak Party (MGP). She served as the second Chief Minister of Goa, Daman and Diu from 1973 to 1979, and was the president of the MGP. She is the first and only woman to serve as the Chief Minister of Goa, Daman and Diu.

== Early life and background ==
Shashikala Kakodkar was born on 7 January 1935 at Pernem, Goa, Portuguese India, to Dayanand and Sunandabai Bandodkar as their eldest child. Her younger siblings were Usha Vengurlekar, Kranti Rao, Jyoti Bandekar and Siddharth Bandodkar.

Kakodkar completed her elementary education from the Mushtifund Saunstha and completed her matriculation from the People's High School in Nova Goa (now Panjim). At age eleven, she participated in Goa's liberation movement by shouting patriotic slogans, and was beaten by Portuguese police officers for doing so. She graduated from Karnatak University, Dharwad, with a Bachelor of Arts degree, where she studied anthropology, sociology and history. She completed her postgraduate M.A. degree from Bombay's Elphinstone College.

In 1963, the first democratically held elections to the Legislative Assembly of Goa, Daman and Diu led to her father Dayanand Bandodkar's election as the first chief minister. That year, she married Gurudatt Kakodkar, and was appointed as the general manager of the Bandodkar Group of Companies in 1968. She was also a member of the Youth Red Cross Society, All India Women's Conference and the Central Social Welfare Board. She built her power base around the Government Primary Teachers' Association.

== Entry into politics ==
Kakodkar was engaged in social work ever since her return from Bombay after obtaining her postgraduate education. She contested the 1967 Goa, Daman & Diu Legislative Assembly election from the Ponda constituency as a candidate of the Maharashtrawadi Gomantak Party and won by a huge majority, making her the second woman member of the Goa, Daman & Diu Legislative Assembly. In the 1972 Goa, Daman & Diu Legislative Assembly election, Kakodkar successfully contested as a Maharashtrawadi Gomantak Party candidate from the Bicholim constituency.

=== Minister of State ===
Following her victory in the 1972 Assembly elections, she was appointed as a Minister of State in the government led by her father, Chief Minister Dayanand Bandodkar. She held the portfolios of Education, Public Health, Social Welfare, Public Assistance, Provedoria and Small Savings. On 12 August 1973, her father died in office, and the legislators of the Maharashtrawadi Gomantak Party unanimously selected her as the next Chief Minister.

== Tenure as Chief Minister ==
=== First Shashikala Kakodkar Ministry ===
Shashikala Kakodkar was sworn in as the Chief Minister of Goa, Daman and Diu on 13 August 1973 at 11:20 p.m. by the then-Lieutenant governor of Goa, Daman and Diu Sisirkumar Banerjee at the Raj Bhavan. Along with Kakodkar, Pratapsingh Rane and A. K. S. Usgaonkar were sworn in as Cabinet Ministers. Her own post of Minister of State was kept vacant till the end of the term. Kakodkar also succeeded Bandodkar as the President of the Maharashtrawadi Gomantak Party and held the charge of both these posts until the 1977 Goa Legislative Assembly election.

Kakodkar took over the eleven portfolios held over by her father Dayanand Bandodkar, and created four more. They included General Administration, Secretariat Administration, Home, Finance, Confidential & Vigilance Department, Industry, Public Works Department, Education, Information & Tourism, Public Health, Small Savings, Public Assistance, Provedoria, Social Welfare, and Goa Archives.

The portfolios of A. K. S. Usgaonkar and Pratapsingh Rane were left untouched. Usgaonkar who was a freedom fighter and a businessman had five portfolios of Planning, Development, Irrigation & Power, Agriculture and Animal Husbandry. Rane who was a political novice had eight portfolios of Law & Judiciary, Labour, Legislative Affairs, Revenue, Local Self Government, Housing & Junta, Civil Supplies and Food.

As Kakodkar took over the reins of the government, she accepted the mistakes and shortfalls of the Dayanand Bandodkar regime in a bid to win the support of his critics. She vowed to carry forward the unfinished task of her father, in order to retain Bandodkar's supporters. Aureliano Fernandes states that unlike Bandodkar, Shashikala emerged as an efficient administrator. Fernandes further states that Kakodkar was less of an extrovert than her father, and consequently was far less accessible. She was initially seen as "Bandodkar's daughter", but soon emerged as a leader in her own right. This was evident from the victory of Ramakant Khalap, who was the Maharashtrawadi Gomantak Party's candidate in the Mandrem constituency by-election which was vacant following the demise of Dayanand Bandodkar. Kakodkar also scripted history when the Maharashtrawadi Gomantak Party candidate Luta Ferrao defeated Dr. Wilfred de Souza in the historic by-election in the Benaulim constituency in 1974. In a marked departure from the earlier stand taken by her party, Kakodkar declared that the question of Goa's merger with Maharashtra was a dead issue, and that both Marathi and Konkani were the official languages of Goa. Kakodkar established the Economic Development Corporation of Goa, Daman & Diu (now the Economic Development Corporation – EDC, Goa) in March 1975. She also established the Goa Board of Secondary & Higher Secondary Education in 1975.

Shashikala Kakodkar's government also took steps towards land reforms. Her government enacted the Goa, Daman and Diu Mundkar (Protection from Eviction) Act, 1975 and the Goa, Daman and Diu Agricultural Tenancy (5th Amendment) Act, 1976. The Supreme Court of India upheld the constitutional validity of the Goa, Daman and Diu Agricultural Tenancy (5th Amendment) Act, 1976 in Union Territory of Goa, Daman and Diu v. Lakshmibai Narayan Patil.

Some of the other important legislation enacted by the first Shashikala Kakodkar Ministry include the Goa, Daman & Diu Irrigation Act, 1973; Goa, Daman & Diu Chit Funds Act, 1973; Goa, Daman & Diu Barge tax Act, 1973; Goa, Daman & Diu Highways Act, 1974; Goa, Daman & Diu Town and Country Planning Act, 1974; Goa, Daman & Diu Motor Vehicles Act, 1974; Goa, Daman & Diu Secondary and Higher Secondary Education Board Act, 1975; Goa, Daman & Diu Public Gambling, Act 1976 and the Goa, Daman & Diu Habitual Offenders Act, 1976.

Shashikala Kakodkar was criticised by the opposition for alleged favouritism towards her husband Gurudatt Kakodkar in granting transport and cement licenses and tyre dealerships. The opposition had also alleged that the structural design of the Kala Academy was given to her brother-in-law Sharad Vengurlekar. However, none of these charges could be proved. Kakodkar was also accused of giving maximum government advertisements to the Marathi fortnightly Sameer, of which her husband was the editor.

Kakodkar's tenure say a more accommodating approach towards Konkani and a gradual shift from the pro-Marathi stance which was earlier adhered to by the MGP. Fernandes argues that this shift was a result of political exigency, given the Maharashtrawadi Gomantak Party's victory in the 1974 by-election in Benaulim constituency. In January 1974, Kakodkar's cabinet made Marathi compulsory in all English medium primary schools to the exclusion of Konkani. This move was criticised by the Konkani Bhasha Mandal as a back-door policy to impose Marathi.

Kakodkar's style of decision making basically centred around the Chief Minister and she heavily relied on a coterie for advice which included her husband Gurudatt Kakodkar. Two MLAs of the Maharashtrawadi Gomantak Party, Jaisingrao Rane and Punaji Achrekar resigned, protesting against Kakodkar's decision-making style without consulting the party rank and file. Pratapsingh Rane also resigned from the government and the Maharashtrawadi Gomantak Party, prior to the 1977 Goa Legislative Assembly election. He joined the Indian National Congress.

It was in these circumstances that Shashikala Kakodkar led the Maharashtrawadi Gomantak Party in the 1977 Goa Legislative Assembly election.

=== Second Shashikala Kakodkar ministry ===
In the Assembly elections of 1977 which were held after the Emergency, Kakodkar faced a challenge leading the party. The resignation of her cabinet Minister Pratapsingh Rane and MLAs Jaisingrao Rane and Punaji Achrekar; allegations of corruption and favouritism were the major challenges faced by Kakodkar. In her manifesto, Kakodkar spoke against the Emergency and the demand for full-fledged statehood to Goa. Her manifesto contained the issue of developing Konkani language (while continuing support to Marathi as an important state language). She also promised an efficient administration, rapid socio-economic development, rise in standard of living, balanced regional development, a High Court for Goa and extension of education, health and agricultural productivity.

Shashikala Kakodkar battled against the odds and the Maharashtrawadi Gomantak Party once again managed to come back to power, winning 15 seats out of the total 30. Sarto Esteves cites Kakodkar's leadership capacities as the reason for the Maharashtrawadi Gomantak Party forming the government in 1977. Minister A. K. S. Usgaonkar faced a shock defeat in his Pale, Goa constituency. However, those who had rebelled and deserted the Maharashtrawadi Gomantak Party on issues of merger and Marathi, were soundly defeated. They included Jaisingrao Rane, Punaji Achrekar, Krishnanath Baburao Naik, Pandurang Purushottam Shirodkar and Janardan Jagannath Shinkre.

Shashikala Kakodkar successfully retained her Bicholim seat and formed the government with the backing of two independent candidates, Makanbhai Morarji Bhatela of Daman and Narayan Fugro of Diu. Kakodkar was sworn in as the Chief Minister of Goa, Daman and Diu for the second time on 7 June 1977. Kakodkar's cabinet included Shankar Laad and Vinayak Dharma Chodankar as Cabinet Ministers, while Raul Hilario Fernandes was appointed as a Minister of State. Narayan Fugro was appointed as the Speaker and Makanbhai Morarji Bhatela the Deputy Speaker.

In her second Ministry too, Kakodkar held the majority of portfolios including Home, Finance (including Small Savings), Personnel & Administrative Reforms, Industries (including Weights and Measures), Planning, Development (including Rural Development & Cooperation), Education (including Archives), Social Welfare, Public Assistance & Provedoria, Information & Tourism, Public Works Department (including Water Supply), Inland Waterways and Town & Country Planning. Shankar Vishveshwar Laad was allocated the portfolios of Law & Judiciary, Legislative Affairs, Labour, Revenue (including Forests) and Urban Development (including Municipalities and excluding Town and Country Planning). Vinayak Dharma Chodankar was given the portfolios of Agriculture (including Animal Husbandry and Fisheries), Irrigation (Major, Medium & Minor), Power and also Food, Civil Supplies & Price Control. Minister of State Raul Hilario Fernandes held the portfolios of Education (including Archives), Information & Tourism, Social Welfare and also the portfolio of Public Assistance & Provedoria. After being sworn in, Kakodkar informed the media that her immediate task was to pursue the statehood issue with the Government of India.

To curb unemployment in Goa, Kakodkar established eleven industrial estates during her second term as the Chief Minister. In 1977, Kakodkar's government beautified the Ponda Fort at Farmagudi, Goa and installed an equestrian statue of Chhatrapati Shivaji there.

The plaque unveiled after the inaugurating of Shivaji's statue at the Ponda Fort, Farmagudi

In her second tenure, Kakodkar faced rebellion within her party after an initially peaceful tenure of about one year. First-time MLAs Dilkush Desai and Dayanand Narvekar initiated a rebellion within the M. G. Party demanding that the party's Executive Body be scrapped and fresh elections be held to the body. Subsequently, they demanded the resignation of Chief Minister Kakodkar. As a result of their anti-party activities, the M. G. Party's Executive Body served a show-cause notice upon MLAs Desai and Narvekar. When the M. G. Party's Executive met on 21 January 1979, Chief Minister Kakodkar stated how both the MLAs had engaged in anti-party activities since June 1978. Kakodkar also spoke about the manner in which MLAs Dilkush Desai and Dayanand Narvekar made irresponsible remarks, took an anti-government stance in the Legislative Assembly and engaged in attempts to destabilise the government.

On 26 January 1978, a meeting was organised in Dilkush Desai's Rivona constituency to inform the people about their MLA's anti-party activities. Shashikala Kakodkar stated in the meeting that if need be, she was ready to sit in the opposition but would never concede before selfish politics. In the same meeting, Kakodkar's Law Minister Shankar Vishveshwar Laad also condemned the actions of MLAs Dilkush Desai and Dayanand Narvekar. Laad further stated that the manner in which the pro-poor Communidades (Amendment) Bill was opposed by the duo along with the opposition MLAs, was unfortunate. Subsequently, Laad too joined ranks with the rebels.

The subsequent Assembly Session saw a series of defeats and humiliations for the government led by Kakodkar. On 16 March 1979, Opposition MLA Ananta Narcinva (Babu) Naik tabled a private member's resolution before the House that the prices of cinema tickets be reduced by 30%. MLAs Dilkush Desai and Dayanand Narvekar supported the resolution as a result of which there was a tie (14 votes each, in favour and against the resolution). Speaker Narayan Fugro used his casting vote in favour of the government (i.e., against the resolution) as a result of which the resolution was defeated. MLAs Dilkush Desai and Dayanand Narvekar voted in favour of the government while four Bills were passed by the Assembly on 21 March 1979.

On 23 March 1979, opposition MLA Francisco Sardinha sought leave of the House to introduce an amendment to the Goa, Daman & Diu Agricultural Tenancy Act, 1964. MLAs Dilkush Desai and Dayanand Narvekar voted in favour the leave being granted to introduce the Bill, as a consequence of which the government was defeated in the Assembly over this question. On 30 March 1979, a resolution tabled by Opposition MLA Leo Velho was supported by MLAs Dilkush Desai and Dayanand Narvekar, resulting in a tie (14 votes each, in favour and against the resolution). Speaker Narayan Fugro used his casting vote in favour of the resolution (i.e., against the government). Belekar states that although Speaker Narayan Fugro did use his casting vote in favour of the government on a few subsequent occasions, the process of Fugro's rebellion against Kakodkar may have started on 30 March 1979.

On 17 April 1979, the Assembly witnessed a tie (14 votes each, in favour and against) during voting on demands for grants. But by using his casting vote, Speaker Narayan Fugro saved the government. A defeat of the demands for grants would have led to an exit of the Kakodkar government. The same episode was repeated on 18 April 1979 and Speaker Narayan Fugro's casting vote led to the demands for grants being passed.

=== Exit of Shashikala Kakodkar's Ministry ===
The tribulations of Shashikala Kakodkar's second Ministry went on in the Assembly Session. The rebellion by MLAs Dilkush Desai and Dayanand Narvekar had reached its last stage and it was almost certain that the duo would join ranks with the Opposition to cause the exit of Shashikala Kakodkar's government. Even if a single additional MLA of the M. G. Party would have joined ranks with the rebels, the government led by Kakodkar would have been in danger. Hence, attempts were rife to obtain the support of another MLA in favour of the rebels.

On 19 April 1979, the discussion was held as regards the demands for grants for three departments: Administration of Justice; Land Revenue, Stamps & Registration; and Legislature Secretariat of the Union Territory. Seven MLAs participated in the discussion but the discussion could not be concluded. The House was adjourned to meet again on 20 April 1979. When the House met on Friday, 20 April 1979 at 2:30 p.m., there was a lot of chaos in the House. The Speaker adjourned the House for 14 minutes at 2:40 p.m. When the House met again pursuant to the adjournment, the chaos continued. Subsequently, the Speaker adjourned the House to meet again on Monday, 23 April at 2:30 p.m.

The reason behind the din on 20 April 1979 was that Kakodkar's Law Minister Shankar Vishveshwar Laad had joined ranks with the rebels after resigning as a Minister. He along with MLAs Dilkush Desai and Dayanand Narvekar had withdrawn support from the Kakodkar government. MLAs Laad, Desai and Narvekar joined the Opposition and staked a claim to form the government under Laad's leadership. Speaker Narayan Fugro too supported the majority faction and personally met the Lieutenant Governor to intimate the same. As a consequence, the House witnessed an Opposition which had the majority of 17 members (including Speaker Fugro) while the Chief Minister Kakodkar had the support of only 13 MLAs. Hence, the government lost the majority in the House. But Kakodkar did not resign and as a result, chaos happened in the Assembly on 20 April 1979. Chief Minister Kakodkar called on the Lieutenant Governor but refused to resign and both agreed that the Assembly was the appropriate place to hold a trial of strength on 23 April 1979. Kakodkar was desperately in need of one MLA to tilt the balance in her favour and pass the Appropriation Bill and thus save the government.

It was under these circumstances that the House met next on Monday, 23 April 1979. As the House met, there was utter chaos in the House. Speaker Fugro was prevented from proceeding towards the Speaker's chair by four Maharashtrawadi Gomantak Party MLAs amid loud slogans. The House then had turned into a battleground of sorts. Paperweights, chairs, the Constitution and microphones were hurled at each other. The Speaker's chair was vandalised and even Mahatma Gandhi's bust in the House was not spared. The newspapers then described the incident as a blot on the democratic tradition of the Assembly and also published photographs of the vandalism which occurred in the House.

There was much confusion in the House and it was under these circumstances that Speaker Fugro put the cut motion on demands for grants no. 3- Administration of Justice, to vote. The cut motion was accepted and the division of votes was 15–13. The success of the cut motion meant an exit of the Kakodkar government. Subsequently, Speaker Narayan Fugro stood on the podium and amid the din, declared the defeat of the government on the cut motion and adjourned the House sine die. After Speaker Fugro left the House, the Deputy Speaker Makanbhai Morarji Bhatela occupied the Speaker's chair and announced that the House was adjourned to meet again at 2:30 p.m. on 24 April 1979. Subsequently, Speaker Fugro again entered the House and adjourned the House sine die.

Kakodkar sat quietly and it was only later that she castigated the behaviour of her MLAs. In a bid to safeguard her position, she is supposed to have declared that she would not accept the Speaker's ruling because it was not made from the Speaker's chair but from the corner of the dais. The Lieutenant Governor P. S. Gill who received the Speaker's report stated that a defeat on the cut motion to budgetary demands was tantamount to a no-confidence motion in the ministry and that he was convinced that Shankar Laad enjoyed the majority. It was not left to the Union Government to take a decision regarding whether Laad should be allowed to form the ministry or whether President's rule should be imposed.

Shashikala Kakodkar subsequently rushed to New Delhi with the Deputy Speaker Bhatela, which was seen as an attempt to apparently make the transfer of power in favour of Laad as difficult as possible. She called on the President of India Neelam Sanjiva Reddy, Prime Minister of India Morarji Desai and the Union Home Minister Hirubhai M. Patel probably urging them to dissolve the Assembly and impose President's rule. Nine of Kakodkar's supporters (loyal M. G. Party MLAs) dispatched telegrams to New Delhi to this effect to bolster her case.

Shashikala Kakodkar resigned as the Chief Minister on 26 April 1979. On 28 April 1979, President's rule was imposed in Goa, Daman and Diu for six months with a provision for its extension. The then Prime Minister of India Morarji Desai rationalised that political horse trading should not take place in pursuance of forming a new government. The Prime Minister's opinion was criticised by some as being against the established parliamentary tradition of the person commanding the largest majority (Shankar Laad in the present case) being invited to form the government. The Leader of the Opposition in the Assembly, Ananta Narcinva (Babu) Naik, criticised the imposition of President's Rule by accusing Prime Minister of India Morarji Desai of having "squarely slaughtered" democracy by not allowing the Shankar Laad group of 17 legislators to form the new government. Shashikala Kakodkar's supporters welcomed the imposition of the President's Rule.

Wilfred de Souza, the President of the Goa Pradesh Congress Committee, disclosed that the Indian National Congress was parting ways with the Janata Party in Goa for the latter's failure to prevail on the Union Government led by Janata Party's Morarji Desai to allow an alternate government despite Laad's majority. Wilfred de Souza held the General Secretary of the Janata Party G. Y. Bhandare and the Prime Minister's son Kanti Desai responsible for the imposition of President's Rule.

In the 1980 Indian general election, Kakodkar played an active role in ensuring the victory of the Maharashtrawadi Gomantak Party candidate Sanyogita Rane Sardesai from the North Goa (Lok Sabha constituency). Rane Sardesai remains the only woman ever elected to the Parliament of India from Goa.

== Praise and criticism ==
Political commentators like Sarto Esteves have lavished praise on Kakodkar for her victory in the 1977 Goa Legislative Assembly election and for her contribution to education, agriculture, industries and social and medical services. Esteves praises her abilities and behaviour which depicted that "Goans could ensure political stability and run the administration of the Territory without constant and continual overseeing by the Centre [New Delhi]."

Other less-generous critics of Kakodkar indict her of running a corruption-prone government, which was particularly dominated by Goa's then-strong transport lobby, and which saw a lot of her fellow Gomantak Maratha Samaj caste members gain predominance in government postings. Towards the end of her tenure, Kakodkar's government was hit by two major agitations—one led by traditional fishermen protesting against a policy which saw mechanised fishing eating majorly into their interests, and another campaign by students demanding a 50% bus fare concession for all bona fide students. The latter was largely successful. Kakodkar's government also faced a major embarrassment after the annual financial budget was leaked in the Marathi daily Gomantak, even before it was placed before the Assembly.

=== Ramponkar agitation ===
The Ramponkar agitation by tradition fishermen protested against the mechanisation of fishing. The transition in Goa from traditional to mechanised fishing led to the woes of the ramponkars (traditional fishermen) being unheard. The ramponkars had several complaints against mechanised fishing. Mechanised fishing through fishing trawlers posed a serious threat to the livelihood of ramponkars.

In December 1975, the Goemchya Ramponkarancho Ekvott (G. R. E.) was formally established at the Institute Menezes Braganza. In 1976, the Goemchya Ramponkarancho Ekvott (G. R. E.) forwarded the first memorandum to Chief Minister Kakodkar. However, the response of the government failed to respond favourably and accused the G. R. E. of misleading the traditional fishermen. Around this time, the Union Government started various schemes to develop the fishing industry. These schemes were supplemented by government aid and the fishermen were encouraged to seek loans from the banks. The big fishing trawler-owners invested in large-scale fishing for huge profits. The livelihood of the Ramponkars was threatened but the government failed to respond to their woes.

In 1976, the ramponkars went on a chain hunger strike for 380 days. The ramponkars were supported by the Opposition Indian National Congress and Janata Party leaders such as Ananta Narcinva (Babu) Naik, Ferdino Rebello, Victoria Fernandes, Evagrio George. Freedom fighter Mohan Ranade also lent his support to the agitation. A citizens' committee was formed and the issue was debated for the first time in the Legislative Assembly. However, no constitutional action could be taken as the Union Government had declared an Emergency. The ramponkars held a 40-day dharna at the chief minister's residence and a demonstration in Panaji. In 1978, the second general body meeting of the Goemchya Ramponkarancho Ekvott (G. R. E.) was held and the organisation undertook several local agitations across Goa against the use of mechanised fishing trawlers. It held a protest march meeting in Panaji demanding a five-kilometre zone that would be free from trawlers and purse seiners. A ban on fishing during monsoons was also demanded. By 1978, the fishing sector in Goa had been highly mechanised and most trawler owners had political connections. A morcha by ramponkars to the Secretariat in Panaji turned violent resulting in stone pelting. When on 27 January 1978, 85 ramponkars were arrested and the stalemate continued, two M. G. Party MLAs Dilkush Desai and Dayanand Narvekar, backed what they called the "just demands" of the ramponkars and criticised the Central Government as well as the local fisheries Minister.

The trawler owners tried to maximise their profits and embarked on a legal battle. In May 1978, they challenged the Portuguese Act of 1897 in the Judicial Commissioner's Court. In his judgment, Justice Tito Menezes was bad as the act was bad as the state government could not follow an ambivalent policy. He opined that night trawling and fishing during monsoons should stop. Following this, there were sporadic protests, agitations, morchas and arrests. The trawlers continued to dredge the bed of the shore as it was 'legal' from their point of view. The trawlers were interested in fishing within a 2-kilometre zone primarily because this zone was the breeding ground and habitat of most of the species that were demand in the international markets.

The Goemchya Ramponkarancho Ekvott (G. R. E.) realised that a local struggle would not yield the desired results and hence decided to associate with the national leaders. In 1978, they formed the National Forum for Catamaran and Country Boat Fishermen Rights and Marine Life (N. F. F.). The G. R. E. was affiliated to it. The state government patronised the trawlers and developed fish-landing jetties. In July 1978, Matanhy Saldanha was appointed the Chairman of the N. F. F. Memorandums were submitted to the Prime Minister of India, Union Fisheries Minister and all Members of the Parliament. For the first time, the issue was debated in the Parliament of India and a representative of the N. F. F. was sent to New Delhi to demand a Central Marine Bill. In September 1978, a delegation of the N. F. F. was informed that a model bill would be circulated in all the fishing states to introduce a legislation in their respective Vidhan Sabhas.

In 1979, Matanhy Saldanha was jailed on false charges and later acquitted by the Additional Sessions Judge. By 1980, the ramponkars had renewed their agitation against non-fishing vessels and mechanised trawlers that caught juvenile mackerels and sardines against Order No. 21-8-81-FSH/6. This was one of the provisions incorporated in the Goa, Daman and Diu Marine Fishing Regulation Act, 1980. In 1980, the Union Government led by Indira Gandhi circulated to all the States a draft of the Marine Regulation Bill which was to be enacted in the respective Vidhan Sabhas, because fisheries was a subject in the State List. Meanwhile, clashes between the ramponkars and trawler owners worsened as the latter demanded the implementation of the Bill. There was clashes and the rampons were burnt in Velsao, Cansaulim, Benaulim and Betalbatim. The failure of the Kakodkar government to handle the agitation was one of the reasons for the Maharashtrawadi Gomantak Party's defeat in the 1980 Goa Legislative Assembly election.

=== 50% bus fare concession movement ===
The other major movement faced by the Shashikala Kakodkar Ministry was the movement by students demanding a 50% bus fare concession for all bona fide students. In 1978, the All Goa Students' Union and the All India Students' Organization, Goa unit, launched a movement demanding concession in bus fares for all bona fide students. The student community in Goa felt that all students should get a 50% concession in bus fares like fellow students in other states of India. The private bus owner's lobby led by the All Goa Bus Owners' Association was very powerful then and also had the backing of the Kakodkar-led government. The student bodies demanded that the government should provide a concession of 50% for all bona fide students in Goa.

On 29 December 1978, the students issued a press note announcing their decision to pay only concessional fare from January 1979 should the government delay their demand. They fixed the concessional fare table and set up a committee to deal with any complaints of resistance from bus operators. Student commuters were told to immediately report any resistance to student representatives. The agitation spread across Goa like wildfire. Buses were burnt as violence erupted. Bandhs were observed and students held protest marches. The students braved lathi charges and tear gas. Student leaders such as Desmond D'Costa were detained too. But after hectic parleys, the Kakodkar government finally conceded to the demand of the students on 12 January 1979. Many leaders of the 50% bus fare concession movement subsequently became towering figures in Goa's public life. These include journalist Sandesh Prabhudesai; lawyers such as Aires Rodrigues and Satish Sonak; District & Sessions Judge Desmond D'Costa, etc.

=== Budget leak incident ===
The Marathi daily Gomantak had always stood solidly behind the Maharashtrawadi Gomantak Party in its propaganda for the merger with Maharashtra. The generally very cordial relations with Gomantak however soured during the last years of the Kakodkar government. Fernandes states that during Kakodkar's last years in regime, there is a reason to believe that the editor of Gomantak tried to influence the functioning of the government. When Chief Minister Kakodkar refused to give in, the Gomantak attempted to embarrass Kakodkar by publishing the entire budget of 1978–79 in the newspaper even before it was presented before the Assembly. The Opposition criticised the government and stated that the leakage of the budget had proved the government's inefficiency as it was unable to guard the most important secret document of the administration. The Opposition demanded the resignation of the government led by Kakodkar.

Shashikala Kakodkar alleged that the budget leak was a conspiracy against her government and demanded that it the culprits be severely punished. The accreditation of the reporters were withdrawn and some employees of the Government Printing Press were suspended after an enquiry. This budget leak adversely affected the image of the government.

== Post-1980 politics ==
After the exit of the Kakodkar Ministry in 1979, President's rule was imposed on 28 April 1979. Fresh elections to Legislative Assembly would decide the next Chief Minister of Goa. Prior to the 1980 Goa Legislative Assembly election, many changes took place in Goa's political arena.

The two M. G. Party MLAs who had played a pivotal role in the ouster of the Kakodkar government were Dayanand Narvekar and Dilkush Desai. Narvekar joined the Indian National Congress in December 1979 and was soon followed by Desai. At that time, the Indian National Congress in Goa was known as the Indian National Congress (Urs) faction because after the Indian National Congress split of 1978, the Congress Legislature Party in the Goa, Daman and Diu Legislative Assembly identified itself with the Indian National Congress (Urs). The Indian National Congress (Urs) as a political party in Goa was led by its President Wilfred de Souza, who was not a MLA. The Indian National Congress led by Indira Gandhi (Indira Congress) also had its presence in Goa and was led by Purushottam Kakodkar. But as far as the 1980 Goa Legislative Assembly election were concerned, the Indian National Congress (Urs) (Urs Congress) as well as the Indira Congress had an understanding between themselves. The Indian National Congress (Urs) led by Wilfred de Souza had a seat sharing agreement with the Indira Congress and the latter was given six constituencies. The Indian National Congress (Urs) contested in twenty-two constituencies while one constituency was left for an independent candidate. Indira Gandhi addressed a public meeting on 12 December 1979 at Panaji's Azad Maidan grounds where she apologised to the people for imposing a state of Emergency in 1975. She expressed the need for developing Goa without harming its natural beauty.

The 1980 Assembly Elections, the Indian National Congress (Urs) emerged victorious in 20 out of the 22 constituencies in which it contested. While the Indira Congress won no seats, the Maharashtrawadi Gomantak Party secured victory in only seven constituencies. The independents won three seats and Shashikala Kakodkar was defeated in the Bicholim constituency by Harish Narayan Prabhu Zantye, an independent candidate. Pratapsingh Rane became the Chief Minister of Goa and Dayanand Narvekar secured a berth in his Ministry. In a subsequent cabinet expansion, Harish Zantye was also included as a Minister.

The 1980 Indian general election resulted in the Indira Congress emerging victorious. Indira Gandhi became the Prime Minister of India and many members of the Indian National Congress (Urs) attempted to rejoin the Indira Congress. The Indian National Congress (Urs) government in Goa too started negotiations for rejoining the Indian National Congress led by Indira Gandhi. The Goa Pradesh Executive of the Indian National Congress (Urs) passed a resolution deciding to merge with the Indian National Congress. The merger occurred in the second week of February 1980. On 12 February 1980, Chief Minister Pratapsingh Rane announced that the government in Goa was that of the Indira Congress.

=== Entry into the Indian National Congress ===
When the Indian National Congress (Urs) faction in Goa merged itself with the Indian National Congress led by Indira Gandhi, five MLAs of the Maharashtrawadi Gomantak Party (Vishnu Rama Naik, Deu Mandrekar, Narsinhbai Tandel, Vinayak Chodankar and Somjibhai Solanki) also joined the Indian National Congress in 1980. On 20 March 1980, A. R. Antulay announced in New Delhi that Shashikala Kakodkar, the President of the Maharashtrawadi Gomantak Party, had joined the Indian National Congress along with her followers. On 22 March 1980, Kakodkar stated that the Maharashtrawadi Gomantak Party's Executive had agreed for the merger of the party within the Indian National Congress. This would mean the demise of the Maharashtrawadi Gomantak Party. Kakodkar stated that the reason behind her joining the Indian National Congress was that she wanted to be in the mainstream.

Kakodkar's announcement was opposed by many senior leaders of the Maharashtrawadi Gomantak Party. On 23 March 1980, a meeting was held under the leadership of Mukund Shinkre (former Lok Sabha Member of Parliament) where the party workers and leaders including M. S. Prabhu decided not to permit the merger of the party. A temporary committee was established under the Presidency of Mukund Shinkre. The two MLAs of the Maharashtrawadi Gomantak Party (who had not joined the Indian National Congress) opposed Kakodkar's stance and made every attempt to ensure that the Maharashtrawadi Gomantak Party survived. These two MLAs were Ramakant Khalap and Babuso Gaonkar. Ramakant Khalap was appointed as the Opposition leader in the Assembly.

Belekar points out that if the merger of the Maharashtrawadi Gomantak Party had occurred in 1980, the Legislative Assembly would virtually have no Opposition members at all. The Assembly then had 20 MLAs of the Indian National Congress and seven MLAs of the Maharashtrawadi Gomantak Party, while the remaining three were Independents. If Khalap and Gaonkar had joined the Indian National Congress along with the remaining five MLAs of the Maharashtrawadi Gomantak Party, there would exist no Opposition at all in the Assembly.

Kakodkar aimed to secure positions within the Goa Pradesh Congress Committee organisation for herself and her supporters. But Wilfred de Souza threatened to resign if he was deprived of the position of the Goa Pradesh Congress Committee's president. Kakodkar was not comfortable in the Indian National Congress and she quit the party.

=== Formation of the Bhausaheb Bandodkar Gomantak Party ===
Kakodkar decided to return to the Maharashtrawadi Gomantak Party. The party was then led by Mukund Shinkre. A historic meeting to facilitate Kakodkar's return to the party was organised by the Maharashtrawadi Gomantak Party's stalwarts such as Dr. Wilfred Menezes Mesquita, J. J. Rodrigues and Shankar Bandekar. But the talks failed and Kakodkar established a new political party called the Bhausaheb Bandodkar Gomantak Party of which she became the President. Kakodkar contested the 1984 Assembly elections from both Canacona and Marcaim constituencies as an independent candidate but lost the elections.

=== Return to Maharashtrawadi Gomantak Party ===
Kakodkar rejoined the Maharashtrawadi Gomantak Party by merging the Bhausaheb Bandodkar Gomantak Party into the Maharashtrawadi Gomantak Party.

=== The 1989 elections ===
The 1989 elections to the first Goa State Legislative Assembly were held for 40 constituencies on 22 November 1989. Since the Indian National Congress managed to achieve a wafer-thin majority with 21 seats, Pratapsingh Rane was elected as the Chief Minister of Goa by the Congress Legislature Party. Rane was sworn in as the first Chief Minister of the newly established State of Goa on 11 January 1990. Rane faced a dilemma as there were too many aspirants for ministerial posts. Dr. Luis Proto Barbosa reluctantly accepted the Speaker's post. Rane decided to expand his cabinet in two phases and assured his legislators that he would soon expand the Cabinet after the Budget Session.

But Rane' strategy did not succeed and his promise of expanding the Cabinet after the Budget Session in March 1990 was shattered as a group of seven MLAs led by Speaker Barbosa split from the Indian National Congress to christen itself as the Goa People's Party (GPP). The GPP staked claim to form a new Ministry with the support of the 18 Maharashtrawadi Gomantak Party MLAs and Independent MLA Ananta Narcinva (Babu) Naik.

The GPP consisted of MLAs dissatisfied due to their exclusion from the Cabinet and included Dr. Luis Proto Barbosa (Speaker), Churchill Alemao, Farrel Furtado, Mauvin Godinho, Somnath Zuwarkar, Luis Alex (Mama) Cardozo and John Baptist Gonsalves. The coalition government of the GPP, Maharashtrawadi Gomantak Party and an Independent was named as the Progressive Democratic Front (PDF) Government. After a hectic political transition by making Churchill Alemao the interim Chief Minister of Goa on 27 March 1980 for a period of just 17 days (Alemao was the Chief Minister from 27 March 1980 to 13 April 1990) and appointing Ramakant Khalap as the Deputy Chief Minister, Speaker Barbosa was made the Chief Minister of Goa. Union Minister George Fernandes played an instrumental role in the formation of the PDF Government. Dr. Luis Proto Barbosa resigned as the Speaker and was sworn in as the Chief Minister of Goa on 13 April 1990.

Shashikala Kakodkar was sworn in as a Minister in the cabinet headed by Dr. Barbosa. Kakodkar was allotted the portfolios of Education, Art & Culture, Transport and Fisheries.

=== Contribution as Education Minister ===
Kakodkar's tenure as Education Minister is widely noted for her policy on the medium of instruction for primary level schools across Goa. Kakodkar's policy of providing government grants to primary (Class I to IV) schools in Goa mandated that grants would be allotted only to schools imparting primary level education in Konkani or Marathi. The policy would be implemented from June 1990. Kakodkar managed to convince the then Chief Minister of Goa Dr. Luis Proto Barbosa and the Official Language Minister Churchill Alemao who too supported the decision. As a consequence of Kakodkar's policy, many primary schools changed their medium of instruction to Konkani or Marathi from English. 130 primary schools operated by the Church's Diocesan Society of Education overnight changed their medium of instruction from English to Konkani. Kakodkar also decided not to permit the establishment of any new primary schools imparting education in English, but this policy was not adhered to by the subsequent governments.

On 4 December 1990, Shashikala Kakodkar along with the Deputy Chief Minister Ramakant Khalap and three other Maharashtrawadi Gomantak Party ministers from the PDF Government resigned after differences within Goa's first coalition government. Chief Minister Dr. Luis Proto Barbosa finally resigned on 10 December 1990, before the voting on the no-confidence motion could take place.

== Post 1990 politics ==
Kakodkar was elected to the Goa Legislative Assembly in the 1994 elections from the Maem constituency as a Maharashtrawadi Gomantak Party candidate. In 1999, Kakodkar contested the Goa Legislative Assembly as from the Maem constituency as a Maharashtrawadi Gomantak Party candidate but was defeated by Prakash Fadte of the Bharatiya Janata Party. Kakodkar contested her last election unsuccessfully as a Maharashtrawadi Gomantak Party candidate from the Maem constituency and was defeated by Harish Zantye of the Indian National Congress. After the defeat in the 2002 elections, Kakodkar did not contest any subsequent election.

== Other positions held ==
Kakodkar served as the Chairperson of the Kala Academy. She was the chairperson, Goa, Daman and Diu Industrial Development Corporation; chairperson, Goa, Daman and Diu State Sports Council; chairperson, Goa Cancer Society; President, Red Cross Committee (Goa Branch) and the Working President of the Marathi Bhavan Nirman Committee. In October 1998, Kakodkar was appointed the Chairperson of the Goa Bal Bhavan.

From 1991 to 1992, Kakodkar also served as the Chairperson of the Committee on Petitions and a member of the Committee on Public Undertakings in the Goa Legislative Assembly. She served as the President of the Panjim Gymkhana Club, Panaji.

== Social activism and philanthropy ==
Kakodkar also assisted the Goa Football Association in reviving the Bandodkar Gold Trophy. She was a patron of many social and religious organisations.

In 2006, Kakodkar participated in the Marathi Bachao Aandolan movement during the tenure of Luizinho Faleiro as Goa's Education Minister against making English a compulsory language at the primary level. Sheo the convener of the Bharatiya Bhasha Suraksha Manch which subsequently became the Goa Suraksha Manch.

== Honours ==
Shashikala Kakodkar received an honorary doctorate by her alma mater, the Karnatak University of Dharwad, in 2014.

== Death ==
Kakodkar died on 28 October 2016 at the Bandodkar House in Altinho, Panaji after a prolonged illness. The Government of Goa declared a two-day state mourning in her honour. She was cremated on 29 October 2016 at the St. Inez crematorium in Panaji with full state honours.
