= Premendra Shet =

Indian politician

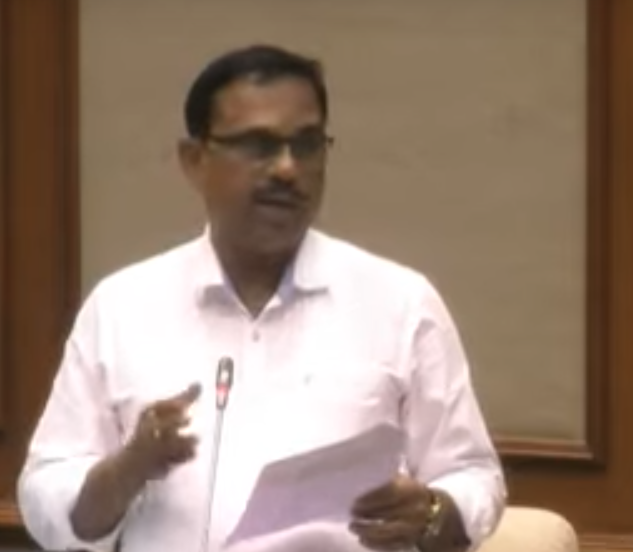
- Shet in 2024

Member of Goa Legislative Assembly
- Incumbent
- Assumed office 10 March 2022
- Preceded by: Pravin Zantye
- Constituency: Maem

Personal details
- Born: Premendra Vishnu Shet
- Party: Bharatiya Janata Party (2022- till date)
- Other political affiliations: Maharashtrawadi Gomantak Party
- Relatives: Anant Shet (brother)
- Education: B.Sc
- Alma mater: Government College of Arts Science and Commerce, Sanquelim

Premendra Vishnu Shet is an Indian politician and a member of the Goa Legislative Assembly. Shet won the Maem Assembly constituency on the Bharatiya Janata Party ticket in the 2022 Goa Legislative Assembly election. Shet defeated Santosh Kumar Sawant of Goa Forward Party by 3136 votes. He is brother of former Goa Legislative Assembly Speaker Anant Shet.
