= Sanquelim =

- Town
- Location of Sanquelim in Goa Sanquelim (India)
- Coordinates: 15°33′45″N 74°00′40″E
- Country: India
- State: Goa
- District: North Goa
- Sub-district: Bicholim
- Elevation: 78 m (256 ft)

Population (2011)
  - Total: 13,651
- Time zone: UTC+5:30 (IST)
- PIN: 403505
- Area code: 91 832
- Vehicle registration: GA-04

Sanquelim is a town and municipal council in North Goa district in the Indian state of Goa.

== Geography ==
Sanquelim is situated in the Bicholim Taluka of North Goa. It has an average elevation of 78 metres (256 feet).

== Demographics ==
As of the 2011 India census, Sanquelim had a population of 13,651. Males constitute 51.8% of the population and females 48.2%. Sanquelim has an average literacy rate of 91.5%, higher than the national average of 74.04%: male literacy is 94.22%, and female literacy is 91.48%. In Sanquelim, 10% of the population is under 6 years of age.

== Government and politics ==
Sanquelim is part of Sanquelim (Goa Assembly constituency) and North Goa (Lok Sabha constituency). Following the delimitation of constituencies in 2008, Sanquelim was established as a separate assembly constituency. Pratap Prabhakar Gauns of the Indian National Congress became the first elected Member of the Legislative Assembly (MLA) from Sanquelim, after winning the 2008 by-election for the erstwhile Pale constituency.

During his tenure, Pratap Prabhakar Gauns initiated several key development projects in the constituency, including the establishment of the Ravindra Bhavan Sanquelim, the Goa Institute of Management, the Primary Health Centre Sanquelim, a garbage treatment plant, a swimming pool, and a sewage treatment plant in Sanquelim.
