= Bicholim (disambiguation) =

Bicholim is a city and a municipal council in North Goa district in the state of Goa, India.

Bicholim may also refer to:

- Bicholim taluk, an administrative region of Goa, India
- Bicholim (Goa Assembly constituency), a Goa Legislative Assembly constituency of the state of Goa, India
- Bicholim conflict, a Wikipedia hoax
