= Pramod Sawant =

Chief Minister of Goa (born 1973)

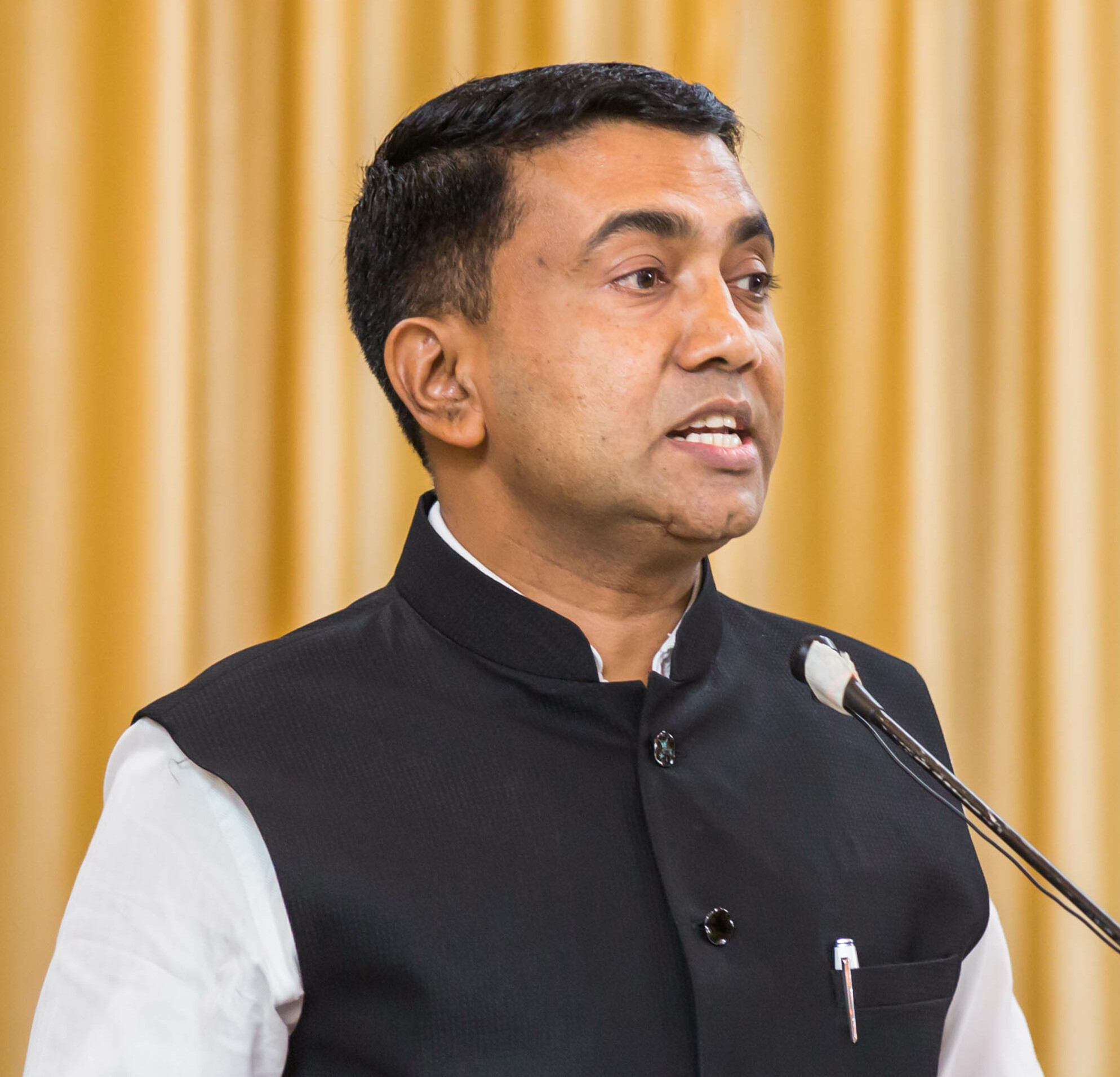
- Sawant at Goa University in 2021

11th Chief Minister of Goa
- Incumbent
- Assumed office 19 March 2019
- Governor: Mridula Sinha; Satya Pal Malik; Bhagat Singh Koshyari; P. S. Sreedharan Pillai; Ashok Gajapathi Raju
- Deputy: Sudin Dhavalikar; Vijai Sardesai; Manohar Ajgaonkar; Chandrakant Kavlekar
- Preceded by: Manohar Parrikar

Leader of the House in Goa Legislative Assembly
- Incumbent
- Assumed office 19 March 2019
- Preceded by: Manohar Parrikar

Member of Goa Legislative Assembly
- Incumbent
- Assumed office 8 March 2012
- Preceded by: Pratap Prabhakar Gauns
- Constituency: Sanquelim

Speaker of the Goa Legislative Assembly
- In office 22 March 2017 – 18 March 2019
- Preceded by: Anant Shet
- Succeeded by: Rajesh Patnekar

Personal details
- Born: Pramod Pandurang Sawant; 24 April 1973 (age 53) Pali-Kothambi, Goa, India
- Party: Bharatiya Janata Party (since 2008)
- Spouse: Sulakshana Sawant (m. 2005)
- Children: 1
- Education: Tilak Maharashtra University (MSW)
- Occupation: Politician

Pramod Pandurang Sawant (born 24 April 1973) is an Indian politician and former medical practitioner who has served as the 11th chief minister of Goa since March 2019. He represents the Sanquelim constituency in the Goa Legislative Assembly as a member of the Bharatiya Janata Party since 2012.

== Early life and education ==
Pramod Pandurang Sawant was born on 24 April 1973 in Pali-Kothambi, Goa, to Pandurang Sawant. He obtained a Bachelor of Ayurveda, Medicine and Surgery degree from the Ganga Education Society's Ayurvedic Medical College in Kolhapur and a postgraduate degree of Master of Social Work from the Tilak Maharashtra University at Pune.

== Political career ==
Sawant started his electoral career when he contested the 2008 Pale Constituency by-election on the Bharatiya Janata Party ticket and lost to Pratap Prabhakar Gauns of the Indian National Congress. The Pale constituency was abolished due to the delimitation of assembly constituencies.

He contested the 2012 assembly election from the newly formed Sanquelim constituency and won with 14,255 votes, securing 66.02% of the vote share and defeating Gauns of the Indian National Congress. He also served as the spokesperson of the Goa unit of the Bharatiya Janata Party for a brief period of time.

In the 2017 election, Sawantas re-elected from Sanquelim, defeating Dharmesh Saglani of the Indian National Congress with 10,058 votes (43.04%). On 22 March 2017, he was elected as the Speaker of the Goa Legislative Assembly.

He secured a third consecutive victory in the 2022 assembly election from Sanquelim, again defeating Saglani again. However, the contest was much tighter than previous years — Sawant won by a narrow margin of just 666 votes, receiving 12,250 votes (47.73%) against Saglani’s 11,584 votes (45.13%).

== Chief Minister of Goa ==
After the death of Manohar Parrikar, the seat of the Chief Minister of Goa fell vacant. Sawant was elected by the Legislative Assembly and later he was sworn in as the 13th Chief Minister of Goa on 19 March 2019.

== Personal life ==
Sawant is a Maratha by caste. On 28 May 2005, he married Reshma Santosh Sawant Maratha by caste, after marriage renamed as Sulakshana Sawant, a teacher of chemistry at the Shri Shantadurga Higher Secondary School in Bicholim. She is also a leader of the Bharatiya Janata Party and currently the President of the Goa unit of the BJP Mahila Morcha. The couple has a daughter, Parthivi, born on 17 August 2007. Sawant has been associated with the Rashtriya Swayamsevak Sangh (RSS) since his youth.

== See also ==
- Pramod Sawant ministry
