= Gurudas Gauns =

Indian politician

Member of Goa Legislative Assembly
- In office 2007–2007
- Preceded by: Suresh Amonkar
- Succeeded by: Pratap Prabhakar Gauns
- Constituency: Pale

Personal details
- Born: 6 October 1966 Navelim, Bicholim, Goa, India
- Died: 4 June 2008 (aged 41)
- Spouse: Ashwini Gauns
- Relations: Pratap Prabhakar Gauns (brother)
- Children: 1

Gurudas Gauns was an Indian politician who served as Member of Goa Legislative Assembly from Pale Assembly constituency. In 2007 Goa Legislative Assembly election, he got 7,768 votes.

== Personal life ==
Gauns was born on 6 October 1966 to Prabhakar Gauns and Parvati P. Gauns in Navelim, Bicholim. He married Ashwini Gauns and have one child, He was the brother of Pratap Prabhakar Gauns. He died on 4 June 2008.
