= Goa Praja Party =

Indian political party

- President: Pandurang Raut
- Lok Sabha Leader: None
- Rajya Sabha Leader: None
- Founded: 2000 (25 years ago)
- Headquarters: Bicholim
- Ideology: Democratic socialism
- Political position: Centre-left to Left-wing
- ECI Status: Unrecognised Party
- Alliance: Unaffiliated
- Seats in Lok Sabha: 0 / 543
- Seats in Rajya Sabha: 0 / 245
- Seats in Goa Legislative Assembly: 0 / 32

Goa Praja Party (GPP) is a regional political party in Goa. The party was founded by Pandurang Raut and Prakash Fadte. It was led by Pandurang Raut. The Goa Praja Party allied with Shiv Sena, Maharashtrawadi Gomantak Party and Goa Suraksha Manch to contest the 2017 Goa Legislative Assembly election. The alliance contested in 33 out of the total 40 constituencies.
