= Pratap Prabhakar Gauns =

Indian politician (born 1963)

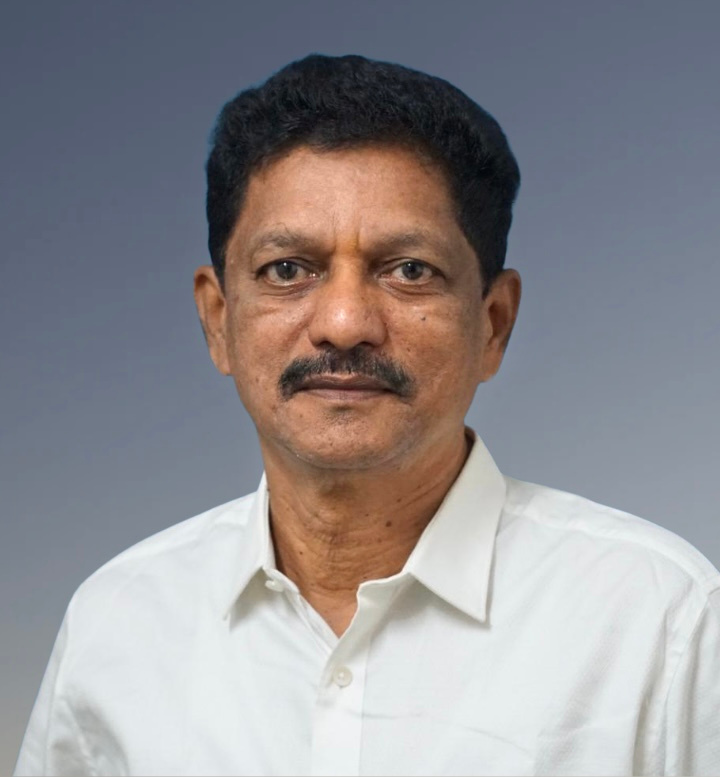
- Gauns in 2021

Member of the Goa Legislative Assembly
- In office 2008–2012
- Preceded by: Gurudas Gauns
- Constituency: Pale

Personal details
- Born: Pratap Prabhakar Gauns; 2 August 1963 (age 62) Goa, India
- Party: Indian National Congress
- Spouse: Geeta Pratap Gauns
- Children: 1

Pratap Prabhakar Gauns (born 2 August 1963) is an Indian politician. He was elected to the Goa Legislative Assembly election as a member of the Indian National Congress party in 2008. He won against BJP candidate Pramod Sawant by a margin of 1534 votes.

During his tenure in Goa Legislative Assembly, he acted as a member of the Estimates Committee, Committee on Delegations, Panel of Presiding Members, and Committee on Public Undertakings.

== Early life ==
Pratap Prabhakar Gauns was born on 2 August 1963 to Prabhakar Y. Gauns and Parvati P. Gauns at Navelim village located in Bicholim Tehsil of North Goa district in Goa, India. He comes from the prominent Maratha family of the Gauns. His family traces their roots to the Gauns clan of Marathas. Pratap has passed the Secondary School Certificate Examination from Goa Board of Secondary and Higher Education. Pratap Prabhakar Gauns is married to Geeta Pratap Gauns and the couple has two children.

== Career ==
During his tenure as a Member of Legislative Assembly, he built a network of all weather roads in Sanquelim, Pale, Amona and Navelim. Development projects like Ravindra Bhavan Sanquelim, Goa Institute of Management, Primary Health Centre Sanquelim, garbage treatment plant, swimming pool Sanquelim, sewage treatment plant in Sanquelim and other projects were undertaken during his tenure.

In the 2007 Goa Legislative Assembly election, his brother Gurudas Gauns was elected from the Pale as an Indian National Congress candidate. Gurudas died in 2008. In 2008 by-elections, Pratap Prabhakar Gauns contested from Indian National Congress and was elected from the Pale against Bharatiya Janata Party candidate Pramod Sawant. The Pale constituency was abolished due to the delimitation of assembly constituencies. In 2012, Gauns had contested the election from Sanquelim representing Indian National Congress and lost against Pramod Sawant. In 2017, Gauns stood for the Assembly election from the Nationalist Congress Party and lost to BJP candidate and current Chief Minister Pramod Sawant.

Currently, Gauns is active in the Indian National Congress Party.
