= First Parrikar ministry =

- Ministry of Goa
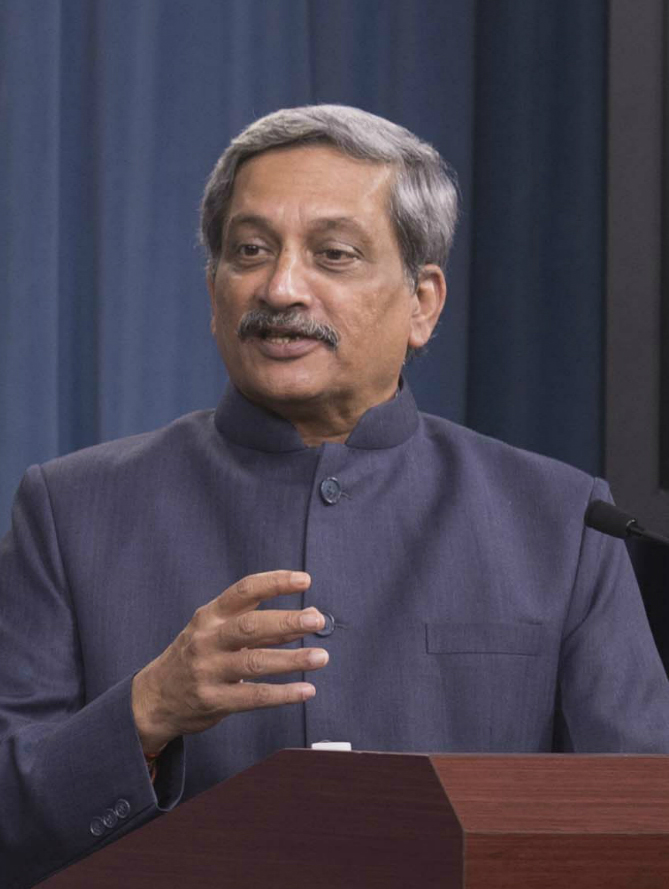
- Manohar Parrikar
- Date formed: 24 October 2000

People and organisations
- Head of state: Governor Mohammed Fazal
- Head of government: Manohar Parrikar
- Member parties: Bharatiya Janata Party; Maharashtrawadi Gomantak Party
- Status in legislature: Majority

History
- Election: 1999
- Legislature term: 5 years
- Predecessor: Sardinha cabinet
- Successor: President's rule

First Parrikar cabinet was the Council of Ministers in Goa Legislative Assembly headed by Chief Minister Manohar Parrikar.

== Council members ==
Name	Office
Manohar Parrikar	Chief Minister
Ravi Naik	Deputy Chief Minister
Ramakant Khalap	Minister
Digambar Kamat	Minister
Sheikh Hassan Haroon	Minister
Prakash Velip	Minister
Pandurang Raut	Minister
Manohar Ajgaonkar	Minister
Filipe Nery Rodrigues	Minister
Jose Philip D'Souza	Minister
Ramarao Desai	Minister
Suresh Amonkar	Minister
Sanjay Bandekar	Minister
Prakash Phadte	Minister
