= Usgaonkar =

Usgaonkar is a surname. This surname is associated with people who had their origin from Usgaon village in Goa. Notable people with the surname include:

- A. K. S. Usgaonkar (1928–2020), Indian politician
- Varsha Usgaonkar (born 1968), Indian actress
