= Maem Assembly constituency =

Legislative Assembly constituency in Goa State, India

Coordinates: 15.57°N 73.92°E

Maem
- Constituency No. 16 for the Goa Legislative Assembly

Constituency details
- Country: India
- Region: Western India
- State: Goa
- District: North Goa
- Lok Sabha constituency: North Goa
- Established: 1989
- Total electors: 28,919
- Reservation: None

Member of Legislative Assembly
- 8th Goa Legislative Assembly
- Incumbent Premendra Shet
- Party: Bharatiya Janata Party

Maem Assembly constituency is one of the 40 Goa Legislative Assembly constituencies of the state of Goa in southern India. Maem is also one of the 20 constituencies falling under North Goa Lok Sabha constituency.

== Members of Legislative Assembly ==
Year	Member	Party
1989	Shashikala Kakodkar	Maharashtrawadi Gomantak Party
1994	Shashikala Kakodkar	Maharashtrawadi Gomantak Party
1999	Prakash Fadte	Bharatiya Janata Party
2002	Harish Zantye	Indian National Congress
2007	Anant Shet	Bharatiya Janata Party
2012	Anant Shet	Bharatiya Janata Party
2017	Pravin Zantye	Bharatiya Janata Party
2022	Premendra Shet	Bharatiya Janata Party

== Election results ==
=== 2027 Assembly election ===
2027 Goa Legislative Assembly election: Maem
Party	Candidate	Votes	%	±%
INC				
NDA				
NOTA	None of the above			
Majority				
Turnout				
gain from		Swing		

=== Assembly Election 2022 ===
2022 Goa Legislative Assembly election : Maem
Party	Candidate	Votes	%	±%
BJP	Premendra Shet	7,874	30.81%	▼20.75
GFP	Santosh Kumar Sawant	4,738	18.54%	New
RGP	Shrikrishna Ravindra Parab	3,974	15.55%	New
MGP	Pravin Zantye	3,424	13.40%	New
IND	Milind Pilgaonkar	2,316	9.06%	New
AAP	Rajesh Tulshidas Kalangutkar	2,084	8.16%	▲5.98
IND	Rohan Vaman Sawaikar	465	1.82%	New
NOTA	None of the Above	332	1.30%	▼0.26
Margin of victory		3,136	12.27%	▼8.36
Turnout		25,553	86.99%	▼0.61
Registered electors		28,919		▲6.72
BJP hold		Swing	▼20.75	

=== Assembly Election 2017 ===
2017 Goa Legislative Assembly election : Maem
Party	Candidate	Votes	%	±%
BJP	Pravin Zantye	12,430	51.56%	▼2.09
INC	Santosh Kumar Sawant	7,456	30.93%	New
GSM	Atmaram Vaman Gaonker	2,317	9.61%	New
NCP	Subhash Narsinha Kinalkar	528	2.19%	▼13.77
AAP	Ajeetsingh Vamanrao Rane	525	2.18%	New
NOTA	None of the Above	377	1.56%	New
Margin of victory		4,974	20.63%	▼4.82
Turnout		24,108	88.97%	▼0.61
Registered electors		27,097		▲8.04
BJP hold		Swing	▼2.09	

=== Assembly Election 2012 ===
2012 Goa Legislative Assembly election : Maem
Party	Candidate	Votes	%	±%
BJP	Anant Shet	12,054	53.65%	▲19.51
Independent	Pravin Zantye	6,335	28.20%	New
NCP	Rudresh Chodankar	3,585	15.96%	New
CPI(M)	Kamlakant Gadekar	225	1.00%	New
Independent	Deepkumar Mapari	212	0.94%	New
Margin of victory		5,719	25.46%	▲22.40
Turnout		22,467	89.36%	▲7.39
Registered electors		25,080		▲31.06
BJP hold		Swing	▲19.51	

=== Assembly Election 2007 ===
2007 Goa Legislative Assembly election : Maem
Party	Candidate	Votes	%	±%
BJP	Anant Shet	5,370	34.14%	▲0.62
INC	Pravin Zantye	4,890	31.09%	▼17.09
MGP	Pilgaonkar Milind Tulshidas	4,590	29.18%	▲21.25
UGDP	Fadte Prakash Jagannath	858	5.45%	New
Margin of victory		480	3.05%	▼11.60
Turnout		15,729	82.08%	▲10.25
Registered electors		19,137		▲3.15
BJP gain from INC		Swing	▼14.03	

=== Assembly Election 2002 ===
2002 Goa Legislative Assembly election : Maem
Party	Candidate	Votes	%	±%
INC	Harish Narayan Prabhu Zantye	6,430	48.18%	▲27.67
BJP	Prakash J. Fadte	4,474	33.52%	▲6.36
SS	Rane Saradesai Aparnadevi Jitendra	1,083	8.11%	▲4.90
MGP	Shashikala Kakodkar	1,058	7.93%	▼10.52
CPI(M)	Kamlakant Krishna Gadekar	290	2.17%	New
Margin of victory		1,956	14.65%	▲8.00
Turnout		13,347	71.88%	▼0.79
Registered electors		18,552		▲7.18
INC gain from BJP		Swing	▲21.01	

=== Assembly Election 1999 ===
1999 Goa Legislative Assembly election : Maem
Party	Candidate	Votes	%	±%
BJP	Prakash Fadte	3,420	27.16%	New
INC	Chopdekar Murari Sambha	2,582	20.51%	New
MGP	Shashikala Kakodkar	2,323	18.45%	▼25.72
Independent	Shetye Kundan Anand	1,952	15.50%	New
Independent	Garde Ramchandra Anant	1,908	15.15%	New
SS	Narvekar Anand Babuso	405	3.22%	New
Margin of victory		838	6.66%	▼18.94
Turnout		12,590	72.73%	▼4.18
Registered electors		17,310		▲4.39
BJP gain from MGP		Swing	▼17.01	

=== Assembly Election 1994 ===
1994 Goa Legislative Assembly election : Maem
Party	Candidate	Votes	%	±%
MGP	Shashikala Kakodkar	5,634	44.17%	▼17.68
Independent	Chopdekar Murari Sambha	2,370	18.58%	New
INC	Ghatwal Kanta Gopi	1,789	14.03%	New
CPI(M)	Gadekar Kamalakant Krishna	1,379	10.81%	New
Independent	Dubhashi Pushparaj Kashinath	927	7.27%	New
BSP	Damodar Kashinath Surlekar	238	1.87%	New
Independent	Shenavi Pilgaonkar Ajeet Bhaskar	108	0.85%	New
Margin of victory		3,264	25.59%	▼13.93
Turnout		12,754	75.35%	▼1.53
Registered electors		16,582		▲11.48
MGP hold		Swing	▼17.68	

=== Assembly Election 1989 ===
1989 Goa Legislative Assembly election : Maem
Party	Candidate	Votes	%	±%
MGP	Shashikala Kakodkar	7,218	61.86%	New
INC	Parab Gaonkar Manohar Gangaram	2,606	22.33%	New
Independent	Rane Sardessai Jeetendrarao Jaiba	719	6.16%	New
CPI	Gadekar Kamalakant Krishna	378	3.24%	New
Independent	Moraskar Puttu Jaidev	175	1.50%	New
Independent	Pilgaonkar Ajit Bhaskar	108	0.93%	New
Margin of victory		4,612	39.52%	
Turnout		11,669	75.44%	
Registered electors		14,875		
MGP win (new seat)				

== See also ==
- List of constituencies of the Goa Legislative Assembly
- North Goa district
