= Sardinha ministry =

- Ministry of Goa
- Date formed: 24 November 1999
- Date dissolved: 24 October 2000

People and organisations
- Head of state: Lt General J. F. R. Jacob
- Head of government: Francisco Sardinha
- Member parties: Goa People's Congress; Bharatiya Janata Party; Maharashtrawadi Gomantak Party; Nationalist Congress Party
- Status in legislature: Majority

History
- Election: 1999
- Legislature term: 5 years
- Predecessor: Second Faleiro cabinet
- Successor: First Parrikar cabinet

Sardinha cabinet was the Council of Ministers in the Goa Legislative Assembly headed by Chief Minister Francisco Sardinha.

== Council of Ministers ==
Name	Office	Portfolio
Francisco Sardinha	Chief Minister	
Dayanand Narvekar	Deputy Chief Minister	Education, Science and Technology and Printing and Stationery
Subhash Shirodkar	Minister	Public Works Department, Mining and Information
Mauvin Godinho	Minister	Revenue, Inspectorate of Factories & Boilers, Weights and Measures
Francise D'Souza	Minister	Law & Judiciary and Labour & Employment, Urban Development
Francise Silveira	Minister	Food Civil Supplies, Sports & Youth Affairs and Housing Board
Aleixo Sequeira	Minister	Industries, Information and Technology, Official Language and Public Grievances.
Somnath Zuarkar	Minister	Transport, Cooperation and Inland Water Transport
Arecio D'Souza	Minister	Agriculture, Provedoria and Fisheries
Venkatesh Desai	Minister	Panchayati Raj, Rural Development Agency and Non-Conventional source of Energy
Victoria Fernandes	Minister	Tourism, Animal Husbandry, Women & Child Development, Fisheries and Agriculture
Digambar Kamat	Former Minister	Power, Protocol, Art & Culture
Prakash Fadte	Former Minister	Education, Science and Technology and Printing and Stationery
Suresh Amonkar	Former Minister	Health, Social Welfare and Labour & Employment
