= Pramod Sawant ministry =

Pramod Sawant ministry may refer to these cabinets headed by Indian politician Pramod Sawant as Chief Minister of Goa:

- First Pramod Sawant ministry (2019–2022)
- Second Pramod Sawant ministry (2022–)
