= A. K. S. Usgaonkar =

Indian politician (1928–2020)

- Portrait of Usgaonkar

Member of Vidhan sabha, Goa
- In office 1963–1977
- Preceded by: constituency established
- Succeeded by: Laxmikant Surlikar
- Constituency: Pale

Deputy Speaker of Vidhan Sabha, Goa
- In office 15 January 1964 – 28 March 1966
- Preceded by: established
- Succeeded by: Mamdali Jiwani

Personal details
- Born: Achyut Kashinath Sinai Usgaonkar; 15 September 1928 Khanapur, Kingdom of Mysore
- Died: 16 June 2020 (aged 91) Goa Medical College, Bambolim, Goa, India
- Party: Maharashtrawadi Gomantak Party
- Spouse: Manikabai
- Children: Varsha Usgaonkar (daughter)
- Education: Peoples High School, Panaji

Achyut Kashinath Sinai Usgaonkar (15 September 1928 – 16 June 2020) was an Indian politician who served as the leader of the Maharashtrawadi Gomantak Party. He served as cabinet rank minister in the Shashikala Kakodkar ministry of Goa, Daman and Diu from 13 August 1977 to 27 April 1979. Prior to that, Usgaonkar was deputy minister in the Dayanand Bandodkar ministry and was also deputy speaker of the Goa, Daman and Diu Legislative Assembly.

Usgaonkar secured victory in the Pale Assembly Election of 1967, garnering a total of 5671 votes.

== Personal life ==
He lived in the Miramar beach area in Panaji.

Usgaonkar's daughter Varsha Usgaonkar is a noted film actress.

== Death ==
Usgaonkar died after a long illness at the Goa Medical College in Bambolim on 16 June 2020.
