= Chandrakant Shetye =

Indian politician

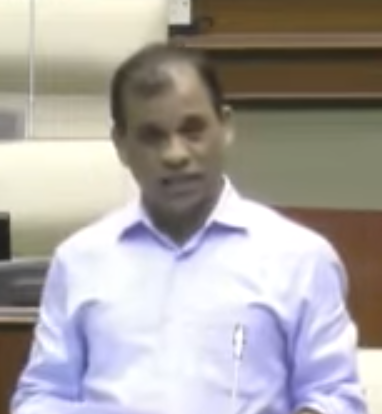
- Shetye in 2024

Member of the Goa Legislative Assembly
- Incumbent
- Assumed office 10 March 2022
- Preceded by: Rajesh Patnekar
- Constituency: Bicholim

Personal details
- Party: Independent
- Education: M.S. Ophthalmology
- Alma mater: Goa Medical College
- Profession: Ophthalmologist

Chandrakant Shetye is an Indian politician and ophthalmologist who serves as a member of the Goa Legislative Assembly. Shetye won the Bicholim Assembly constituency as an independent in the 2022 Goa Legislative Assembly election. He defeated Naresh Sawal of Maharashtrawadi Gomantak Party by 318 votes.
