= Bicholim Assembly constituency =

Legislative Assembly constituency in Goa State, India

Coordinates: 15.59°N 73.96°E

Bicholim
- Constituency No. 3 for the Goa Legislative Assembly

Constituency details
- Country: India
- Region: Western India
- State: Goa
- District: North Goa
- Lok Sabha constituency: North Goa
- Established: 1963
- Total electors: 28,231
- Reservation: None

Member of Legislative Assembly
- 8th Goa Legislative Assembly
- Incumbent Dr. Chandrakant Shetye
- Party: Independent

Bicholim Assembly constituency is one of the 40 Legislative Assembly constituencies of Goa state in India. Bicholim is also one of the 20 constituencies falling under North Goa Lok Sabha constituency.

It is part of North Goa district.

== Members of the Legislative Assembly ==
| Year | Member | Party |
|---|---|---|
| 1963 | Kusumakar Kaskade | Maharashtrawadi Gomantak Party |
| 1967 | Chopdenkar Dattaram | Maharashtrawadi Gomantak Party |
| 1972 | Shashikala Kakodkar | Maharashtrawadi Gomantak Party |
| 1977 | Shashikala Kakodkar | Maharashtrawadi Gomantak Party |
| 1980 | Harish Zantye | Independent |
| 1984 | Harish Zantye | Indian National Congress |
| 1989 | Pandurang Raut | Maharashtrawadi Gomantak Party |
| 1994 | Pandurang Bhatale | Indian National Congress |
| 1999 | Pandurang Raut | Maharashtrawadi Gomantak Party |
| 2002 | Rajesh Patnekar | Bharatiya Janata Party |
| 2007 | Rajesh Patnekar | Bharatiya Janata Party |
| 2012 | Naresh Sawal | Independent |
| 2017 | Rajesh Patnekar | Bharatiya Janata Party |
| 2022 | Dr. Chandrakant Shetye | Independent |

== Election results ==
=== 2027 Assembly election ===
2027 Goa Legislative Assembly election: Bicholim
| Party | Candidate | Votes | % | ±% |
|---|---|---|---|---|
| INC | | | | |
| NDA | | | | |
| NOTA | None of the above | | | |
| Majority | | | | |
| Turnout | | | | |
| gain from | | Swing | | |

=== Assembly Election 2022 ===
2022 Goa Legislative Assembly election : Bicholim
| Party | Candidate | Votes | % | ±% |
|---|---|---|---|---|
| Independent | Dr. Chandrakant Shetye | 9,608 | 37.05% | New |
| MGP | Naresh Sawal | 9,290 | 35.82% | ▼7.04 |
| BJP | Rajesh Patnekar | 5,141 | 19.82% | ▼25.89 |
| INC | Meghashyam Vaman Raut | 913 | 3.52% | ▼4.04 |
| RGP | Anish Avinash Naik | 593 | 2.29% | New |
| NOTA | None of the Above | 341 | 1.31% | ▲0.37 |
| Margin of victory | | 318 | 1.23% | ▼1.63 |
| Turnout | | 25,936 | 90.49% | ▲2.09 |
| Registered electors | | 28,231 | | ▲8.76 |
| Independent gain from BJP | | Swing | ▼8.67 | |

- AAP is supporting the independent candidate Dr. Chandrakant Shetye.

=== Assembly Election 2017 ===
2017 Goa Legislative Assembly election : Bicholim
| Party | Candidate | Votes | % | ±% |
|---|---|---|---|---|
| BJP | Rajesh Patnekar | 10,654 | 45.71% | ▲19.99 |
| MGP | Naresh Sawal | 9,988 | 42.86% | New |
| INC | Manohar Pandurang Shirodkar | 1,761 | 7.56% | ▼23.49 |
| AAP | Sainath Patekar | 358 | 1.54% | New |
| Goa Praja Party | Pandurang Raut | 324 | 1.39% | New |
| NOTA | None of the Above | 221 | 0.95% | New |
| Margin of victory | | 666 | 2.86% | ▼5.69 |
| Turnout | | 23,306 | 89.78% | ▲1.74 |
| Registered electors | | 25,958 | | ▲8.64 |
| BJP gain from Independent | | Swing | ▲6.11 | |

=== Assembly Election 2012 ===
2012 Goa Legislative Assembly election : Bicholim
| Party | Candidate | Votes | % | ±% |
|---|---|---|---|---|
| Independent | Naresh Sawal | 8,331 | 39.60% | New |
| INC | Rajesh Patnekar | 6,532 | 31.05% | ▼5.13 |
| BJP | Manohar Pandurang Shirodkar | 5,411 | 25.72% | ▼25.10 |
| AITC | Pandurang Raut | 720 | 3.42% | New |
| Margin of victory | | 1,799 | 8.55% | ▼6.09 |
| Turnout | | 21,037 | 87.86% | ▲8.65 |
| Registered electors | | 23,894 | | ▲3.10 |
| Independent gain from BJP | | Swing | ▼11.22 | |

=== Assembly Election 2007 ===
2007 Goa Legislative Assembly election : Bicholim
| Party | Candidate | Votes | % | ±% |
|---|---|---|---|---|
| BJP | Rajesh Patnekar | 9,352 | 50.82% | ▼3.42 |
| INC | Naresh Sawal | 6,657 | 36.18% | ▲31.37 |
| MGP | Pandurang Raut | 2,092 | 11.37% | ▼27.38 |
| Save Goa Front | Gad Vivekanand | 267 | 1.45% | New |
| Margin of victory | | 2,695 | 14.65% | ▼0.85 |
| Turnout | | 18,401 | 79.25% | ▲1.08 |
| Registered electors | | 23,176 | | ▲9.89 |
| BJP hold | | Swing | ▼3.42 | |

=== Assembly Election 2002 ===
2002 Goa Legislative Assembly election : Bicholim
| Party | Candidate | Votes | % | ±% |
|---|---|---|---|---|
| BJP | Rajesh Patnekar | 8,960 | 54.24% | ▲21.79 |
| MGP | Pandurang Raut | 6,400 | 38.75% | ▲5.71 |
| INC | Parab Arjun Shrirang | 794 | 4.81% | ▼23.00 |
| NCP | Gad Vivekanand Sukdo | 354 | 2.14% | New |
| Margin of victory | | 2,560 | 15.50% | ▲14.91 |
| Turnout | | 16,518 | 78.27% | ▲5.18 |
| Registered electors | | 21,090 | | ▲0.14 |
| BJP gain from MGP | | Swing | ▲21.21 | |

=== Assembly Election 1999 ===
1999 Goa Legislative Assembly election : Bicholim
| Party | Candidate | Votes | % | ±% |
|---|---|---|---|---|
| MGP | Pandurang Raut | 5,089 | 33.04% | New |
| BJP | Rajesh Patnekar | 4,999 | 32.45% | New |
| INC | Harish Zantye | 4,284 | 27.81% | ▼6.78 |
| SS | Gaonkar Rajaram Arjun | 1,030 | 6.69% | New |
| Margin of victory | | 90 | 0.58% | ▼1.56 |
| Turnout | | 15,404 | 73.13% | ▼4.11 |
| Registered electors | | 21,060 | | ▲9.59 |
| MGP gain from INC | | Swing | ▼1.55 | |

=== Assembly Election 1994 ===
1994 Goa Legislative Assembly election : Bicholim
| Party | Candidate | Votes | % | ±% |
|---|---|---|---|---|
| INC | Pandurang Bhatale | 5,135 | 34.59% | New |
| Independent | Pandurang Raut | 4,817 | 32.45% | New |
| MGP | Adv. Parab Kalidas Vithoba | 4,127 | 27.80% | |
| Independent | Beig Hasham Nur Mohamad | 258 | 1.74% | New |
| BSP | Misal Dari Babu | 185 | 1.25% | New |
| Margin of victory | | 318 | 2.14% | ▼9.70 |
| Turnout | | 14,846 | 75.57% | ▼0.53 |
| Registered electors | | 19,217 | | ▲12.87 |
| INC gain from MGP | | Swing | ▼14.23 | |

=== Assembly Election 1989 ===
1989 Goa Legislative Assembly election : Bicholim
| Party | Candidate | Votes | % | ±% |
|---|---|---|---|---|
| MGP | Pandurang Raut | 6,465 | 48.81% | New |
| INC | Harish Zantye | 4,897 | 36.98% | |
| Independent | Lawanis Rajanikant Gajanan | 879 | 6.64% | New |
| Gomantak Bahujan Samaj Parishad | Phadtye Anirudha | 279 | 2.11% | New |
| BJP | Desai Ramnath Purushottam | 221 | 1.67% | New |
| Margin of victory | | 1,568 | 11.84% | ▼12.52 |
| Turnout | | 13,244 | 74.83% | ▲1.54 |
| Registered electors | | 17,026 | | ▼17.32 |
| MGP gain from INC | | Swing | ▼6.00 | |

=== Assembly Election 1984 ===
1984 Goa, Daman and Diu Legislative Assembly election : Bicholim
| Party | Candidate | Votes | % | ±% |
|---|---|---|---|---|
| INC | Harish Zantye | 8,607 | 54.82% | New |
| MGP | Naik Vinayak Vasudeo | 4,782 | 30.46% | New |
| Independent | Teli Anant Ramchandra | 441 | 2.81% | New |
| CPI(M) | Gadekar Kamlakant Krishna | 429 | 3.24% | New |
| Independent | Malik Prabhakar Anant | 265 | 2.00% | New |
| Independent | Naik Gopi Dattaram | 192 | 1.45% | New |
| Independent | Raut Vaman Gopal | 168 | 1.27% | New |
| Margin of victory | | 3,825 | 24.36% | ▲8.27 |
| Turnout | | 15,701 | 73.00% | ▼6.56 |
| Registered electors | | 20,592 | | ▲15.60 |
| INC gain from Independent | | Swing | ▼1.82 | |

=== Assembly Election 1980 ===
1980 Goa, Daman and Diu Legislative Assembly election : Bicholim
| Party | Candidate | Votes | % | ±% |
|---|---|---|---|---|
| Independent | Harish Zantye | 8,354 | 56.64% | New |
| MGP | Shashikala Kakodkar | 5,981 | 40.55% | |
| Margin of victory | | 2,373 | 16.09% | ▼9.17 |
| Turnout | | 14,750 | 80.47% | ▲9.75 |
| Registered electors | | 17,813 | | ▲5.36 |
| Independent gain from MGP | | Swing | ▲1.05 | |

=== Assembly Election 1977 ===
1977 Goa, Daman and Diu Legislative Assembly election : Bicholim
| Party | Candidate | Votes | % | ±% |
|---|---|---|---|---|
| MGP | Shashikala Kakodkar | 6,866 | 55.59% | ▼8.81 |
| INC | Naik Vinayak Vasudev | 3,746 | 30.33% | New |
| JP | Rane Jaysingrao Abasaheb | 1,488 | 12.05% | New |
| Margin of victory | | 3,120 | 25.26% | ▼15.75 |
| Turnout | | 12,351 | 71.93% | ▼8.25 |
| Registered electors | | 16,906 | | ▲34.36 |
| MGP hold | | Swing | ▼8.81 | |

=== Assembly Election 1972 ===
1972 Goa, Daman and Diu Legislative Assembly election : Bicholim
| Party | Candidate | Votes | % | ±% |
|---|---|---|---|---|
| MGP | Shashikala Kakodkar | 6,589 | 64.40% | ▲1.24 |
| INC | S. Ramesh Narayan | 2,393 | 23.39% | New |
| MGP | Chopdekar Dattaram Keshav | 678 | 6.63% | |
| CPI(M) | Vaz George | 189 | 1.85% | New |
| SSP | Shivajirao G. Desai | 126 | 1.23% | New |
| UGP | Dubhashi Shivaji Ravaji | 97 | 0.95% | New |
| Margin of victory | | 4,196 | 41.01% | ▼9.11 |
| Turnout | | 10,231 | 80.04% | ▲6.68 |
| Registered electors | | 12,583 | | ▲6.57 |
| MGP hold | | Swing | ▲1.24 | |

=== Assembly Election 1967 ===
1967 Goa, Daman and Diu Legislative Assembly election : Bicholim
| Party | Candidate | Votes | % | ±% |
|---|---|---|---|---|
| MGP | C. D. Keshav | 5,565 | 63.16% | New |
| Independent | S. S. Sakharam | 1,149 | 13.04% | New |
| Independent | P. G. M. Gangaram | 444 | 5.04% | New |
| UGP | Da. Shivaji | 365 | 4.14% | New |
| PSP | P. S. Deu | 255 | 2.89% | New |
| Independent | M. A. Dhaktoo | 242 | 2.75% | New |
| Independent | P. G. Babi | 127 | 1.44% | New |
| Margin of victory | | 4,416 | 50.12% | |
| Turnout | | 8,811 | 70.39% | |
| Registered electors | | 11,807 | | |
| MGP win (new seat) | | | | |
