= Shankar Laad =

Indian politician and lawyer (1940–2016)

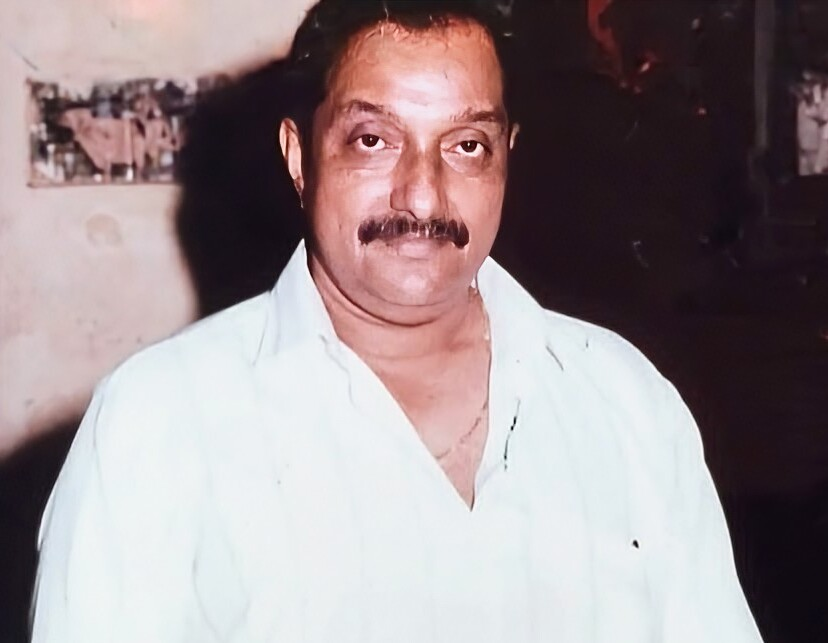
- Laad on his 50th birthday

Member of Goa Legislative Assembly
- In office 1977–1980
- Constituency: Dabolim

Law Minister in Goa, Daman and Diu government
- In office 1977–1979
- Appointed by: Shashikala Kakodkar

Personal details
- Born: 14 August 1940 Vasco da Gama, Portuguese Goa
- Died: 1 April 2016 (aged 75) Vasco da Gama, Goa
- Party: Maharashtrawadi Gomantak Party
- Education: Brihan Maharashtra College of Commerce, Pune
- Occupation: Lawyer

Shankar Vishveshwar Laad (14 August 1940 – 1 April 2016) was an Indian politician from Goa who served as the state's Law Minister in the cabinet of Chief Minister Shashikala Kakodkar from 1977 to 1979.

== Early life ==
Shankar Vishveshwar Laad was born on 14 August 1940 in Vasco da Gama, Portuguese Goa. He studied at the St. Joseph's Institute, Vasco. He later studied B. Com. and LL. B. at Brihan Maharashtra College of Commerce, Pune.

== Early political career ==
Laad was President of the Marmagao Municipal Council from 6 October 1976 to 11 July 1977. Further, he was a member of the Jaycees in Vasco and later became its President in 1976.

== Member of Legislative Assembly ==
Laad was elected to the Goa Legislative Assembly during the fourth term (1977–1979). He belonged to the Maharashtrawadi Gomantak Party (MGP) and was part of the government of Shashikala Kakodkar.

== Dissolution of Kakodkar Ministry ==
Laad served as Law Minister. Kakodkar's government was eventually dissolved in 1979, following internal dissension within the ruling MGP. Laad was the leader of the group that rebelled against her.

== Death ==
Laad died on 1 April 2016 after a prolonged illness. He was living in New Vaddem, Vasco-da-Gama.
