= Pale Assembly constituency =

Former constituency of the Goa Legislative Assembly, in India

Coordinates: 15.37°N 73.89°E

Pale
- Former constituency for the Goa Legislative Assembly

Constituency details
- Country: India
- Region: Western India
- State: Goa
- District: North Goa
- Lok Sabha constituency: North Goa
- Established: 1963
- Abolished: 2008
- Reservation: None

Pale Assembly Constituency was one of the 40 Goa Legislative Assembly constituencies of the state of Goa in Western India. Pale was also one of the 20 constituencies falling under North Goa Lok Sabha constituency.

== Members of the Legislative Assembly ==
Election	Member	Party
1963	A. K. S. Usgaonkar	Maharashtrawadi Gomantak Party
1967	A. K. S. Usgaonkar	Maharashtrawadi Gomantak Party
1972	A. K. S. Usgaonkar	Maharashtrawadi Gomantak Party
1977	Shenvi Surlikar Laxmikant Santaram	Indian National Congress
1980	Naik Vishnu Rama	Maharashtrawadi Gomantak Party
1984	Verenkar Chandrakant Vishwanath	Indian National Congress
1989	Usgonkar Vinay Kumar Pundlik	Maharashtrawadi Gomantak Party
1994	Malik Sadanand Uttam	Maharashtrawadi Gomantak Party
1999	Suresh Amonkar	Bharatiya Janata Party
2002	Suresh Amonkar	Bharatiya Janata Party
2007	Gurudas Gauns	Indian National Congress
2007 By-election	Pratap Prabhakar Gauns	Indian National Congress

== Election results ==
=== Assembly Election 2007 ===
2007 Goa Legislative Assembly election : Pale
Party	Candidate	Votes	%	±%
INC	Gurudas Gauns	7,768	41.70%	▲0.99
BJP	Amonkar Suresh Kuso	6,177	33.16%	▼16.63
MGP	Gawas Shamba	4,032	21.64%	▲13.98
CPI	Christopher Fonseca	291	1.56%	New
Independent	Dessai Bhimrao Dajisaheb	201	1.08%	New
SS	Petkar Lavu Gurunath	129	0.69%	▼1.05
Margin of victory		1,591	8.54%	▼0.54
Turnout		18,628	78.94%	▲2.42
Registered electors		23,559		▲5.55
INC gain from BJP		Swing	▼8.09	

=== Assembly Election 2002 ===
2002 Goa Legislative Assembly election : Pale
Party	Candidate	Votes	%	±%
BJP	Suresh Amonkar	8,519	49.79%	▲5.38
INC	Gawas Gurudas Prabhakar	6,965	40.71%	▲10.89
MGP	Amonkar Ghadi Pradeep Pundalik	1,311	7.66%	▼10.14
SS	Ghadi Damodar Krishna	298	1.74%	▼6.22
Margin of victory		1,554	9.08%	▼5.51
Turnout		17,109	76.58%	▲5.17
Registered electors		22,321		▼0.98
BJP hold		Swing	▲5.38	

=== Assembly Election 1999 ===
1999 Goa Legislative Assembly election : Pale
Party	Candidate	Votes	%	±%
BJP	Suresh Amonkar	7,156	44.41%	New
INC	Gawas Gurudas Prabhakar	4,805	29.82%	▲5.30
MGP	Ghadi Amonkar Pradip Pundalik	2,868	17.80%	▼39.51
SS	Gawade Suryakant Purso	1,283	7.96%	New
Margin of victory		2,351	14.59%	▼18.19
Turnout		16,112	71.48%	▲0.67
Registered electors		22,541		▲9.60
BJP gain from MGP		Swing	▼12.89	

=== Assembly Election 1994 ===
1994 Goa Legislative Assembly election : Pale
Party	Candidate	Votes	%	±%
MGP	Malik Sadanand Uttam	8,346	57.31%	▼3.03
INC	Usgaonkar Vinaykuman Pundalik	3,572	24.53%	▲3.28
Independent	Dessai Laximanrao Dattaram	1,281	8.80%	New
BSP	Gurudas Pandu Parwar	455	3.12%	New
Independent	Chinilkar Sumant Prabhakar	342	2.35%	New
Independent	Bandodkar Sundar Sitaram	187	1.28%	New
Margin of victory		4,774	32.78%	▼6.30
Turnout		14,564	69.39%	▲1.12
Registered electors		20,567		▲7.97
MGP hold		Swing	▼3.03	

=== Assembly Election 1989 ===
1989 Goa Legislative Assembly election : Pale
Party	Candidate	Votes	%	±%
MGP	Usgonkar Vinay Kumar Pundlik	8,009	60.33%	▲32.65
INC	Verenkar Chandrakant Vishwanath	2,821	21.25%	▼17.76
CPI	Vaz George Sabastiao	816	6.15%	▲2.12
SS	Mandrekar Umesh Jagannath	387	2.92%	New
Independent	Kenekar Lavu Jaidav	281	2.12%	New
Independent	Bandodkar Sitaram R.	110	0.83%	New
Independent	Naik Ramchandra Waman	101	0.76%	New
Margin of victory		5,188	39.08%	▲27.75
Turnout		13,275	67.46%	▼4.23
Registered electors		19,048		▼6.86
MGP gain from INC		Swing	▲21.32	

=== Assembly Election 1984 ===
1984 Goa, Daman and Diu Legislative Assembly election : Pale
Party	Candidate	Votes	%	±%
INC	Verenkar Chandrakant Vishwanath	5,897	39.01%	New
MGP	Parab Dasharath Kashinath	4,184	27.68%	▼13.91
Independent	Shenvi Surlekar Laxmikant Shantaram	2,736	18.10%	New
CPI	Gaonkar Babruvahan Nagesh	608	4.02%	New
Independent	Maulingkar Anant Rama	300	1.98%	New
Independent	Karpe Shankar Subrai	292	1.93%	New
Independent	Bhagat Vithal Harichandra	195	1.29%	New
Margin of victory		1,713	11.33%	▲4.94
Turnout		15,117	71.06%	▼4.07
Registered electors		20,451		▲13.83
INC gain from MGP		Swing	▼2.58	

=== Assembly Election 1980 ===
1980 Goa, Daman and Diu Legislative Assembly election : Pale
Party	Candidate	Votes	%	±%
MGP	Naik Vishnu Rama	5,827	41.59%	New
INC(U)	Suryarao Sardessai Ramesh Narayan	4,932	35.20%	New
Independent	Shenvi Surlikar Laxmikant Shantaram	1,945	13.88%	New
JP	Sewant Pandurang Govind	382	2.73%	New
Independent	Morajkar Putu Jaidev	247	1.76%	New
Independent	Podnekar Shanu Jivba	183	1.31%	New
Margin of victory		895	6.39%	▲3.29
Turnout		14,012	75.30%	▲9.56
Registered electors		17,967		▲7.00
MGP gain from INC		Swing	▼2.87	

=== Assembly Election 1977 ===
1977 Goa, Daman and Diu Legislative Assembly election : Pale
Party	Candidate	Votes	%	±%
INC	Shenvi Surlikar Laxmikant Santaram	5,108	44.46%	New
MGP	Sinai Usgaonker Atchut Kashinath	4,752	41.36%	
JP	Kaskar Chandu	807	7.02%	New
CPI	Ghodge Prabnakar Kashiram	463	4.03%	New
Independent	Pedneker Shanu Jivba	145	1.26%	New
Margin of victory		356	3.10%	▼19.16
Turnout		11,489	67.15%	▼7.41
Registered electors		16,791		▲30.06
INC gain from MGP		Swing	▼5.44	

=== Assembly Election 1972 ===
1972 Goa, Daman and Diu Legislative Assembly election : Pale
Party	Candidate	Votes	%	±%
MGP	A. K. S. Usgaonkar	4,885	49.90%	▼12.83
INC	S. U. Prabhakar Krishna	2,706	27.64%	New
MGP	Krishnanath Baburao Naik	1,441	14.72%	
SSP	Alphrisi Alphraid Anton	511	4.45%	New
Margin of victory		2,179	22.26%	▼18.78
Turnout		9,790	73.92%	▲7.33
Registered electors		12,910		▼2.17
MGP hold		Swing	▼12.83	

=== Assembly Election 1967 ===
1967 Goa, Daman and Diu Legislative Assembly election : Pale
Party	Candidate	Votes	%	±%
MGP	A. K. S. Usgaonkar	5,671	62.73%	New
Independent	S. U. P. Krishna	1,961	21.69%	New
UGP	M. Ciriaco	736	8.14%	New
PSP	D. S. Govindrad	209	2.31%	New
Independent	G. Vaz	89	0.98%	New
Margin of victory		3,710	41.04%	
Turnout		9,040	66.02%	
Registered electors		13,196		
MGP win (new seat)				

== See also ==
- Sanquelim Assembly constituency
