= Rajesh Patnekar =

Indian politician

Speaker of the Goa Legislative Assembly
- In office 1 July 2019 – 10 March 2022
- Governor: P. S. Sreedharan Pillai Mridula Sinha
- Chief Minister: Pramod Sawant
- Preceded by: Pramod Sawant
- Succeeded by: Ramesh Tawadkar

Member of Goa Legislative Assembly
- In office 2017–2022
- Preceded by: Naresh Sawal
- Succeeded by: Chandrakant Shetye
- In office 2002–2012
- Preceded by: Pandurang Raut
- Succeeded by: Naresh Sawal
- Constituency: Bicholim

Personal details
- Born: Goa, India
- Party: Bharatiya Janata Party
- Spouse: Aruna Patnekar

Rajesh Tulshidas Patnekar (born 23 September 1963) is an Indian politician and member of the Bharatiya Janata Party. Patnekar was member of the Goa Legislative Assembly from the Bicholim constituency in North Goa. He was re-elected as an MLA in the 2017 Vidhan Sabha Election.

He previously held the seat from 2002-2007 and 2007–2012. He has served as the chairman of the Khadi village and industries board, Govt. of Goa. As a member of Goa Legislative Assembly, he was Chairman Of the public accounts committee, and member of various other committees of the Legislature.

== Personal life ==
His wife Aruna Patnekar is a high school teacher in St. Mary's Convent High School, Mapusa.
