= Pandurang Raut =

Indian politician (1946–2022)

- Official portrait in 1990

Member of the Goa Legislative Assembly
- In office 1989–1994
- Preceded by: Harish Zantye
- Succeeded by: self established
- Constituency: Bicholim
- In office 1999–2002
- Preceded by: Pandurang Bhatale
- Succeeded by: Rajesh Patnekar
- Constituency: Bicholim

President of Goa Praja Party
- In office 2015–2022

Personal details
- Born: Pandurang Dattaram Raut; 13 July 1946 Sal, Bicholim, Goa, Portuguese India
- Died: 3 October 2022 (aged 76)
- Resting place: Sal, Goa, India
- Party: Goa Praja Party (2015–2022)
- Other political affiliations: Maharashtrawadi Gomantak Party (1989–2015)
- Spouse: Vilasini Raut

Pandurang Dattaram Raut (13 July 1946 – 3 October 2022) was an Indian politician, co-founder and president of the Goa Praja Party. Raut was a member of the Goa Legislative Assembly representing the Bicholim constituency. He also served as a cabinet minister from February 1991 to April 1994.

== Personal life and death ==
Pandurang Raut was born on 13 July 1946 in Bicholim, Goa in Portuguese India during the Portuguese Empire. He was married to Vilasini. On 3 October 2022, Raut died from a brief illness, at the age of 76. He was cremated at his native village, Sal in Bicholim.
