= Pravin Zantye =

Indian politician (born 1966)

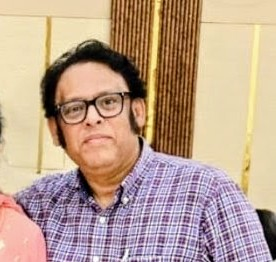
- Zantye in 2025

Goa Legislative Assembly
- In office 2017–2022
- Preceded by: Anant Shet
- Constituency: Maem

Personal details
- Born: Pravin Harish Zantye; 2 March 1966 (age 60)
- Party: Maharashtrawadi Gomantak Party
- Parent: Harish Narayan Prabhu Zantye (father)

Pravin Harish Zantye is an Indian politician and a member of the Maharashtrawadi Gomantak Party. He was elected to the Goa Legislative Assembly from Maem, Goa in the 2017 Goa Legislative Assembly election on Bharatiya Janata Party ticket. Ahead of 2022 Goa Legislative Assembly election, he resigned from the Assembly and BJP, and joined MGP.

His father, Harish Narayan Prabhu Zantye, was a Marathi immigrant who had also been the member of the Goa Legislative Assembly as well as member of the Lok Sabha.
