= Naresh Sawal =

Indian politician

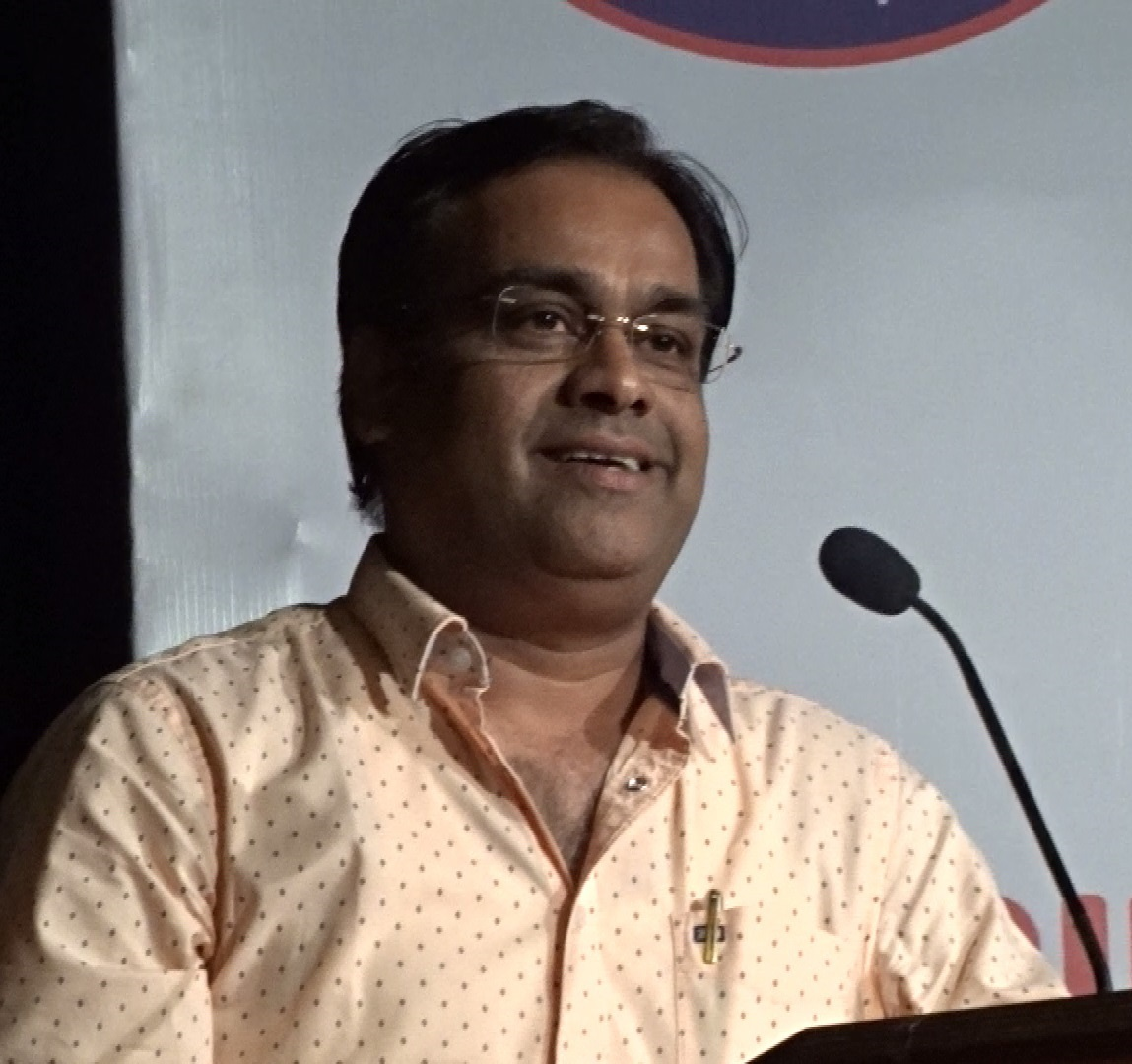
- Sawal in 2016

Member of the Goa Legislative Assembly
- In office 2012–2017
- Preceded by: Rajesh Patnekar
- Succeeded by: Rajesh Patnekar

Personal details
- Party: Independent (2012-2017); Maharashtrawadi Gomantak Party (2017-present)
- Children: 2
- Occupation: Politician

Naresh Sawal is an Indian politician who served as a member of the Goa Legislative Assembly, representing the Bicholim constituency from 2012 to 2017.

== Political career ==
Sawal was one of the few Independent members of the Goa Legislative Assembly until 4 January 2016, when he joined the Maharashtrawadi Gomantak Party.

== Constituency ==
He represented the Bicholim constituency.
