= Anant Shet =

Indian politician (died 2020)

Speaker of the Goa Legislative Assembly
- In office January 2016 – 2017
- Preceded by: Rajendra Arlekar
- Succeeded by: Pramod Sawant

Goa Legislative Assembly
- In office 2007–2017
- Preceded by: Harish Zantye
- Succeeded by: Pravin Zantye
- Constituency: Maem

Personal details
- Died: 2 August 2020 (aged 59)
- Party: Bharatiya Janata Party
- Occupation: Politician
- Website: mahabjp.org

Anant Shet (1960/1961 – 2 August 2020) was an Indian politician and member of the Bharatiya Janata Party. He was a member of the Goa Legislative Assembly.

Anant Shet died on 2 August 2020, aged 59.

== Posts ==
Anant Shet was elected Speaker of the Goa Legislative Assembly in 2016.

== Constituency ==
He represented the Maem constituency of Goa.

== Goa Legislative Assembly ==
- Term 2007–2017.
