= Goa Democratic Front =

The Goa Democratic Front (GDF) or Goa Democratic People Front (GDPF) is a regional political party in the Indian state of Goa. It was established in 2014 a splinter faction of the Indian National Congress. GDF was led by Dayanand Narvekar.
