= Amona, Goa =

Amona
- Village
- Location of Amona in Goa Amona (India)
- Coordinates: 15°32′00″N 73°59′00″E
- Country: India
- State: Goa
- District: North Goa
- Sub-district: Bicholim
- Elevation: 31 m (102 ft)
- Time zone: UTC+5:30 (IST)
- Postcode: 403107
- Area code: 0832

Amona is a census town in North Goa district in the state of Goa, India.

It is believed that Amona was an ancient centre for trade and commerce with a lot of cultivated fertile land and alluvial banks of the Mhadaee, now Mandovi River. The surrounding land holds many cashew plantations and has a Sesa Goa pig iron plant.

The rich soil and centralized location in Gomantak with water networks for inland transport allowed Aryans to settle on the land. Remains of ancient fortresses and settlements submerged in the soil around the ferry wharf region have been reported in Amona by the archeology department of Goa.

The earliest settlers of this region were primarily the Aryan warriors, administrators; and traders. These warriors in medieval times were a part of the Maratha clans. Ancient armour and swords are present in the Amona temples and they reveal an ancient military culture. Scriptures have been found which depict Amona as a capital of ancient dynasties. connectivity (ferry service was used before the bridge was built). There are many colourful festivals held here with natakaas and gadgado.

The Government of Goa launched a project consisting of a road and a bridge connecting the cities of Khandola and Amona across the river Mandovi which is situated 20 km away from Panjim. The area gets often flooded during high tides and the design of the bridge and the road was made accordingly. The bridge is 510 meters in length and is made of a structural steel truss with reinforced cement concrete slab. This bridge has helped to reduce the distance from Sankhali to Panjim to 28 km. It also serves as a tourist spot for people outside Goa.
