= Goa People's Congress =

Political party in India, 2000 to 2001

- Leader: Francisco Sardinha
- Founder: Francisco Sardinha
- Founded: 2000
- Dissolved: 2001
- Split from: Indian National Congress
- Merged into: Indian National Congress
- ECI status: dissolved party
- Alliance: National Democratic Alliance

Goa People's Congress (GPC) is a dissolved Indian political party that was a splinter group of the Indian National Congress in Goa. GPC broke away from INC in 2000 under the leadership of Francisco Sardinha.

GPC formed a coalition government in the state together with Bharatiya Janata Party with Sardinha as Chief Minister. That government lasted nine months. After having broken relations to GPC, BJP continued to govern with support form other Congress dissidents. After the fall of the Sardinha cabinet two GPC members of the legislative assembly, led by Dayanand Narvekar, broke away and formed a parallel GPC.

Sardinha's GPC merged with Indian National Congress on 5 April 2001. Narvekar's GPC merged with INC on 27 August the same year.

== List of Chief Minister ==
# (Note: A parenthetical number indicates that the incumbent has previously held office.)	Portrait	Name (Birth-Death)	Constituency	Term of office			Assembly (election)	Party (Note: This column only names the chief minister's party. The state government he heads may be a complex coalition of several parties and independents; these are not listed here.)
#	Portrait	Name (Birth-Death)	Constituency	From	To	Days in office	Assembly (election)	Party
7		Francisco Sardinha (1955–)	Curtorim	24 November 1999	24 October 2000	335 days	Goa People's Congress	

== Defected MLAs ==
- Francisco Sardinha (Leader of the split and MLA from Curtorim & Chief Minister of Goa)
- Dayanand Narvekar (Cabinet Minister in Sardinha ministry)
- Victoria Fernandes (Cabinet Minister in Sardinha ministry)
- Subhash Shirodkar (Cabinet Minister in Sardinha ministry)
- Somanath Zuwarkar (Cabinet Minister in Sardinha ministry)
- Aleixo Sequeira (Cabinet Minister in Sardinha ministry)
- Francisco Silveira (Cabinet Minister in Sardinha ministry)
- Mauvin Godinho (Cabinet Minister in Sardinha ministry)
- Arecio D'Souza (Cabinet Minister in Sardinha ministry)
- Venkatesh Desai
- Francise D'Souza (Cabinet Minister in Sardinha ministry)

== See also ==
- Indian National Congress breakaway parties
