= Niz Goenkar Revolution Front =

Niz Goenkar Revolution Front is a political party in Goa, India. It was created in 2016 in light of the 2017 Goa Legislative Assembly election.

It advocates for special status for Goa.
