= Sanquelim Assembly constituency =

Legislative Assembly constituency in Goa State, India

Coordinates: 15.42°N 73.95°E

Sanquelim
- Constituency No. 17 for the Goa Legislative Assembly

Constituency details
- Country: India
- Region: Western India
- State: Goa
- District: North Goa
- Lok Sabha constituency: North Goa
- Established: 2008
- Total electors: 27,919
- Reservation: None

Member of Legislative Assembly
- 8th Goa Legislative Assembly
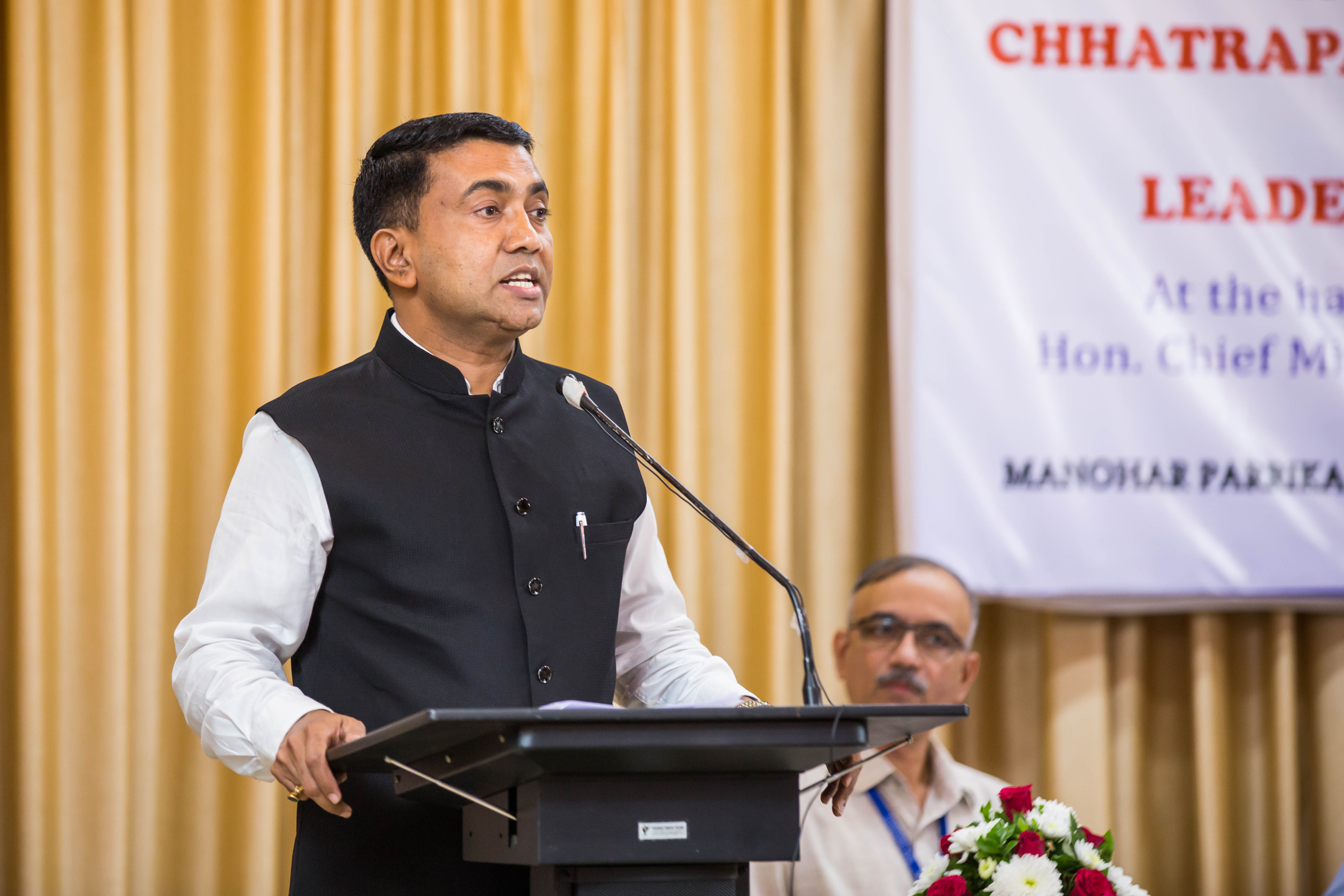
- Incumbent Pramod Sawant; Chief Minister of Goa
- Party: BJP
- Elected year: 2022

Sakhali Assembly constituency, also known as Sanquelim, is one of the 40 Goa Legislative Assembly constituencies of the state of Goa in Western India. It is also one of the 20 constituencies falling under the North Goa Lok Sabha constituency.

Following the delimitation of constituencies in 2008, Sanquelim was established as a separate assembly constituency. Pratap Prabhakar Gauns of the Indian National Congress became the first elected Member of the Legislative Assembly (MLA) from Sanquelim, after winning the 2008 by-election for the erstwhile Pale constituency.

During his tenure, Gauns initiated several key development projects in the constituency, including the establishment of the Ravindra Bhavan Sanquelim, the Goa Institute of Management, the Primary Health Centre Sanquelim, a garbage treatment plant, a swimming pool, and a sewage treatment plant in Sanquelim. Chief minister of state represents this constituency.

== Members of Legislative Assembly ==
Year	Member	Party
2012	Pramod Sawant	Bharatiya Janata Party
2017	Pramod Sawant	Bharatiya Janata Party
2022	Pramod Sawant	Bharatiya Janata Party

== Election results ==
=== 2027 Assembly election ===
2027 Goa Legislative Assembly election: Sanquelim
Party	Candidate	Votes	%	±%
BJP	Pramod Sawant			
INC				
NOTA	None of the above			
Majority				
Turnout				
		Swing		

=== Assembly Election 2022 ===
2022 Goa Legislative Assembly election : Sanquelim
Party	Candidate	Votes	%	±%
BJP	Dr. Pramod Sawant	12,250	47.73%	▲5.29
INC	Dharmesh Saglani	11,584	45.13%	▲11.69
RGP	Sujay Gauns	742	2.89%	New
MGP	Mahadev Yeshwant Khandekar	370	1.44%	New
NOTA	None of the Above	286	1.11%	▼0.27
Margin of victory		666	2.59%	▼6.40
Turnout		25,666	91.94%	▲1.51
Registered electors		27,916		▲6.52
BJP hold		Swing	▲5.29	

=== Assembly Election 2017 ===
2017 Goa Legislative Assembly election : Sanquelim
Party	Candidate	Votes	%	±%
BJP	Dr. Pramod Sawant	10,058	42.44%	▼23.49
INC	Dharmesh Saglani	7,927	33.45%	▼0.48
GSM	Suresh Amonkar	3,831	16.16%	New
NCP	Pratap Prabhakar Gauns	857	3.62%	New
AAP	Milind Gauns	408	1.72%	New
NOTA	None of the Above	329	1.39%	New
Independent	Mahesh Shantaram Parab	218	0.92%	New
Margin of victory		2,131	8.99%	▼23.00
Turnout		23,700	90.43%	▲0.59
Registered electors		26,207		▲8.89
BJP hold		Swing	▼23.49	

=== Assembly Election 2012 ===
2012 Goa Legislative Assembly election : Sanquelim
Party	Candidate	Votes	%	±%
BJP	Pramod Sawant	14,255	65.93%	New
INC	Pratap Gauns	7,337	33.93%	New
Margin of victory		6,918	31.99%	
Turnout		21,623	89.71%	
Registered electors		24,068		
BJP win (new seat)				

=== Assembly By-Election 2008 ===
2008 Goa Legislative Assembly By-Election: Sanquelim
Party	Candidate	Votes	%	±%
INC	Pratap Prabhakar Gauns	7,867	42.78%	New
BJP	Dr. Pramod Sawant	6,333	34.43%	New
Save Goa Front	Jose Lobo	158	0.86%	New
Margin of victory		1,534	8.35%	New
Turnout		18,391	89.95%	New
Registered electors		20,450		New
INC win (new seat)				

== See also ==
- Pale Assembly constituency
- List of constituencies of the Goa Legislative Assembly
- North Goa district
