= Prakash Fadte =

Indian politician

Member of Goa Legislative Assembly
- In office 2012–2017
- Preceded by: Shashikala Kakodkar
- Succeeded by: Harish Zantye
- Constituency: Maem

Minister of Education, Science and Technology and Printing and Stationery
- In office 1999–2002
- Preceded by: n/a
- Succeeded by: n/a
- Constituency: Maem

Personal details
- Born: Prakash Fadte; 9 January 1954 Cumbarjua, Goa
- Died: 17 December 2017 (aged 63) Cumbarjua, Goa
- Party: Bharatiya Janata Party
- Spouse: Veena Phadte
- Parent: Jaganath Phadte (father)
- Education: Bachelor of Art
- Profession: Business

Prakash Jaganath Fadte is an Indian politician. He was elected to the Goa Legislative Assembly from Maem in the 1999 Goa Legislative Assembly election as a member of the Bharatiya Janata Party. He was Minister of Education, Science and Technology and Printing and Stationery in Francisco Sardinha cabinet from November 1999 to October 2000.
