= Harish Narayan Prabhu Zantye =

Indian politician

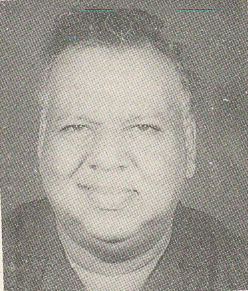

Member of 10th Lok Sabha
- In office 20 June 1991 – 10 May 1996
- Preceded by: Gopal Mayekar
- Succeeded by: Ramakant Khalap
- Constituency: North Goa Lok Sabha constituency

Member of Goa Legislative Assembly
- In office 12 June 2002 – 28 February 2005
- Preceded by: Prakash Fadte
- Succeeded by: Anant Shet
- Constituency: Maem Assembly constituency

Personal details
- Born: 22 September 1935 Malvan, Sindhudurg district
- Died: 20 March 2021 (aged 85)
- Spouse: Pushpa H. Zantye
- Children: Pravin Zantye

Harish Narayan Prabhu Zantye was an Indian politician who served as Member of 10th Lok Sabha from North Goa Lok Sabha constituency and Member of Goa Legislative Assembly from Maem Assembly constituency. He also served as Minister of Social Welfare in Government of Goa.

== Personal life ==
He was born on 22 September 1935 in Malvan, Sindhudurg district. He married Pushpa H. Zantye on 15 February 1966 and got one son and three daughter. He is the father of Pravin Zantye. On 20 March 2021, he died at the age of 86.
