= Subhash Velingkar =

Indian politician and teacher (born 1948)

- Born: Subhash Bhaskar Velingkar; 7 October 1948 (age 77); Nova Goa, Goa, Portuguese India
- Education: Shivaji University (M.A.)
- Occupations: Politician; teacher
- Organisation: Rashtriya Swayamsevak Sangh; Bharatiya Bhasha Suraksha Manch; Hindu Raksha Maha Aghadi
- Political party: Goa Suraksha Manch (since 2016)
- Spouse: Sushma Velingkar (died 2020) remarried
- Children: 4

Subhash Bhaskar Velingkar (born 7 October 1948) is an Indian politician and teacher who is a former member of the Rashtriya Swayamsevak Sangh (RSS), a Hindu nationalist organization. He belongs to the Gomantak Maratha Samaj. The Goa wing of the RSS was formed under his leadership.

== Career ==
Velingkar launched the Bharatiya Bhasha Suraksha Manch, an organization which promoted Konkani and Marathi in schools and the withdrawal of grants to English medium schools in the state of the Goa. He opposed the decision of then-Chief Minister of Goa Digambar Kamat-led government to provide grants to primary level English schools which was opposed by fellow politician Manohar Parrikar and other opposition leaders. After the Bharatiya Janata Party-Maharashtrawadi Gomantak Party alliance won the 2012 Goa Legislative Assembly election, they continued the grants. Velingkar opposed this and subsequently left the Rashtriya Swayamsevak Sangh (RSS) as the Goa chief due to his decision to start a political party. In protest, 400 volunteers of the RSS resigned.

On 2 October 2016, Velingkar officially launched Goa Suraksha Manch (GSM) but neither held any post and did not contest the 2017 Goa Legislative Assembly election. He contested the Panaji Assembly constituency in the by-election in 2019 as a member of the GSM but lost, receiving only 516 votes.

== Criticism of St. Francis Xavier ==
In 2022, Velingkar, as the chief of the Hindu Raksha Maha Aghadi, stated that Saint Francis Xavier was influential in introducing the Goa Inquisition during Portuguese colonial rule. Goan Catholics refer to St. Xavier as "Goencho Saib", the patron saint of Goa. Velingkar stated that the Hindu sage Parashurama deserved the title instead.
