= Goa Suraksha Manch =

- Abbreviation: GSM
- Leader: Subhash Velingkar
- President: Atmaram Gaonkar
- Founder: Subhash Velingkar
- Founded: 2 October 2016; 9 years ago
- Headquarters: Shop No. 644/1, Ward No. 4, Ground Floor, Ahilyaram Niwas, Savaiverem, Ponda, Goa
- Ideology: Regionalism
- Colours: Yellow
- ECI status: Unrecognised Party
- Seats in Goa Legislative Assembly: 0 / 40

Election symbol
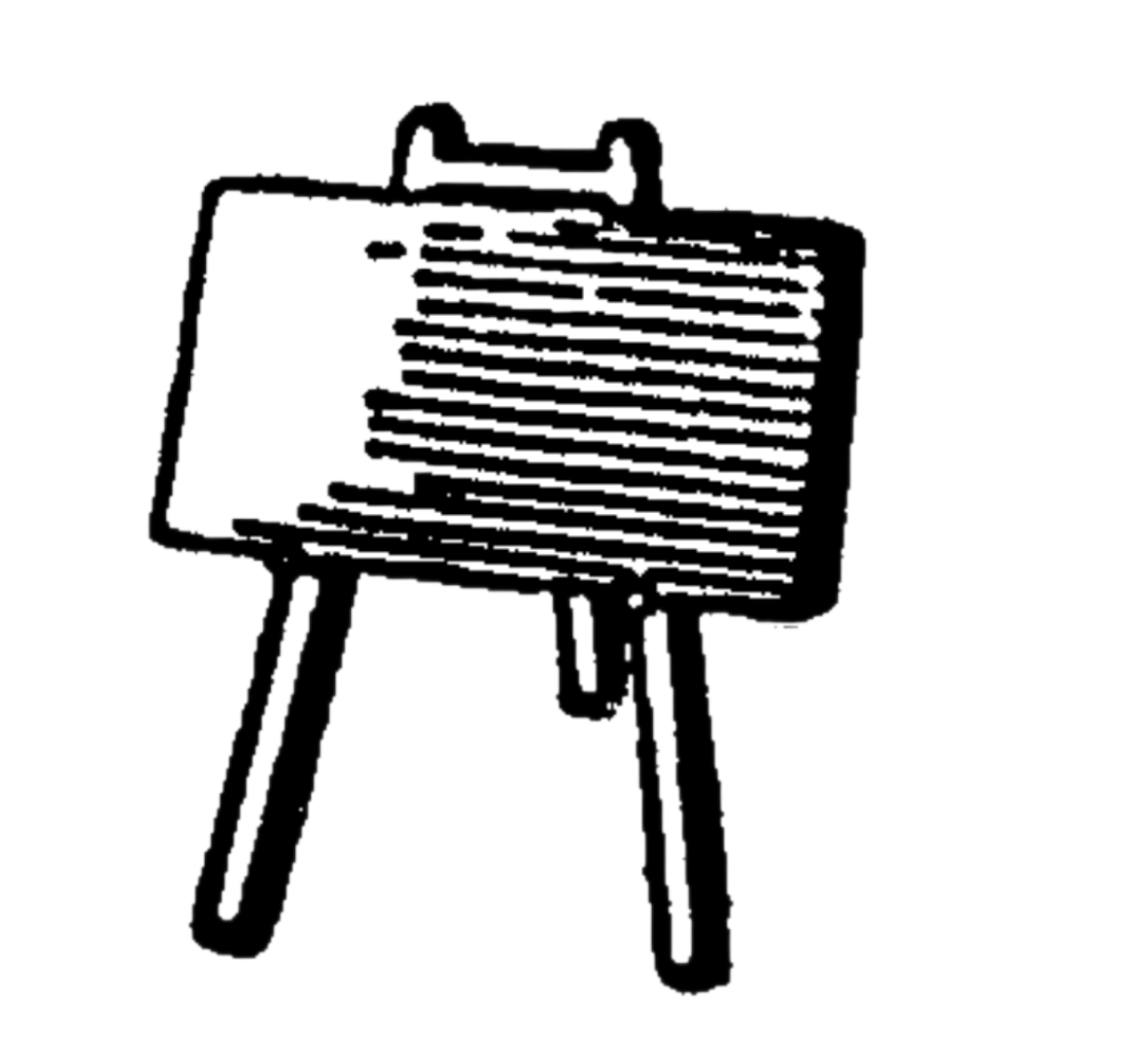

Goa Suraksha Manch is a political party in Goa, a political outfit of the Bharatiya Bhasha Suraksha Manch which was launched by Subhash Velingkar, a rebel Rashtriya Swayamsevak Sangh leader. The party was formed on 2 October 2016.

The main aim of the party is to promote Konkani and Marathi in schools and the withdrawal of grants to English medium schools. The party's symbol is a blackboard.

Its inaugural president is Anand Shirodkar. Swati Kerkar and Kiran Nayak were appointed vice-presidents of the party but Subhash Velingkar neither held any post nor will contest any elections. The party contested the 2017 Goa Legislative Assembly election.

== History ==
Shashikala Kakodkar was the education minister in the Progressive Democratic Party Government led by Dr. Luis Proto Barbosa. Kakodkar's policy of providing government grants to primary (Class I to IV) schools in Goa mandated that grants would be allotted only to schools imparting primary level education in Konkani or Marathi. The policy would be implemented from June 1990. Kakodkar managed to convince the then Chief Minister of Goa Dr. Luis Proto Barbosa and the Official Language Minister Churchill Alemao who too supported the decision. As a consequence of Kakodkar's policy, many primary schools changed their medium of instruction to Konkani or Marathi from English. 130 primary schools operated by the Church's Diocesan Society of Education overnight changed their medium of instruction from English to Konkani. Kakodkar also decided not to permit the establishment of any new primary schools imparting education in English, but this policy was not adhered to by the subsequent governments. This led to the mushrooming of several unaided primary schools in Goa which imparted education in English language. The number of English medium primary schools increased from 26 in 1991 to 144 in 2011.

After the liberation of Goa on 19 December 1961, there was a migration of many Indians from other states to Goa. This led to the establishment of several primary schools imparting education in other Indian languages including Kannada, Telugu, Hindi and Urdu. However, Urdu schools in Goa existed since the Portuguese regime.

Since primary education in English was widely considered as superior, there was also a demand from parents to provide grants to primary level English schools too. The then government headed by Digambar Kamat permitted 135 primary schools to change their medium of instruction to English overnight. This was opposed by many including the opposition led by Manohar Parrikar. The Bharatiya Bhasha Suraksha Manch - Forum For Protection Of Indian Languages was established to oppose the decision of the Digambar Kamat-led government. Manohar Parrikar also participated in the protests organised by the Bharatiya Bhasha Suraksha Manch. The organisation was formed with a view to press the government to adhere to the Kakodkar policy of providing grants only to primary schools imparting primary education in Indian languages only. The debate over the issue of medium of instruction became a bone of contention in the 2012 Goa Legislative Assembly election.

While the Bharatiya Bhasha Suraksha Manch campaigned against grants to primary-level English schools, an organisation called Forum for Rights of Children to Education (FORCE) campaigned for grants to primary-level English schools. During the campaigning for the 2012 Goa Legislative Assembly election, the Bharatiya Janata Party-Maharashtrawadi Gomantak Party alliance supported the movement carried out by the Bharatiya Bhasha Suraksha Manch. The Bharatiya Janata Party-Maharashtrawadi Gomantak Party alliance emerged victorious in the 2012 Goa Legislative Assembly election with the support of the Bharatiya Bhasha Suraksha Manch.

After becoming the Chief Minister of Goa in 2012, Manohar Parrikar continued the policy of the Digambar Kamat-led government. Parrikar stated that it was not feasible to stop grants to those English medium primary schools which had received grants during the Digambar Kamat regime because administrative and technical reasons. Parrikar blamed the Digambar Kamat regime for the problem and issued a notification stating that henceforth, only those primary schools providing education in Konkani and Marathi languages would receive grants. Parrikar also announced certain sops for primary schools providing education in Konkani and Marathi languages

The Bharatiya Bhasha Suraksha Manch protested against this and alleged Manohar Parrikar of having taken a U-turn. The Bharatiya Bhasha Suraksha Manch decided to form a political party to contest the 2017 Goa Legislative Assembly election over the medium of instruction issue. Subhash Velingkar was subsequently dropped from the Rashtriya Swayamsevak Sangh as the Goa chief due to his decision to float a political party and Laxman Behre was appointed in his place. Four hundred volunteers of the Rashtriya Swayamsevak Sangh resigned in protest and a Goa Prant of the Rashtriya Swayamsevak Sangh was formed under the leadership of Velingkar.

The Goa Suraksha Manch was subsequently established on 2 October 2016.

== Electoral politics ==
The Goa Suraksha Manch allied with the Shiv Sena, Maharashtrawadi Gomantak Party and the Goa Praja Party to contest the 2017 Goa Legislative Assembly election. The alliance contested in 33 out of the total 40 constituencies.

Several politicians such as Shyam Satardekar and Dr. Suresh Amonkar who were earlier a part of the Indian National Congress and the Bharatiya Janata Party respectively joined the Goa Suraksha Manch and were also declared subsequently as the party's candidates.

== See also ==
- List of political parties in India
