= Bicholim taluka =

Bicholim Konkani: Bichole
- Taluka
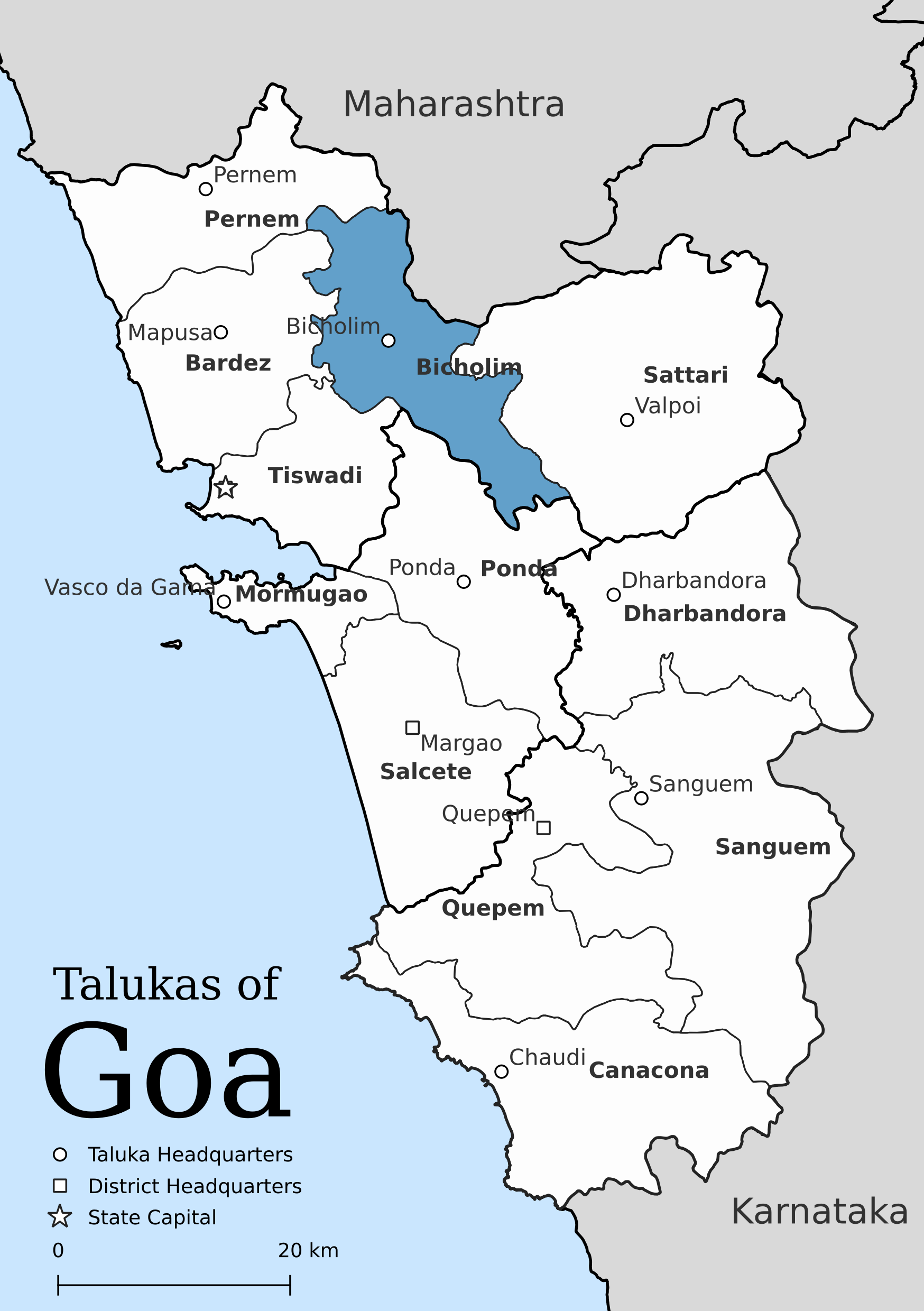
- Location of Bicholim in North Goa district in Goa
- Coordinates: 15.588804°N 73.965469°E
- Country: India
- State: Goa
- District: North Goa
- Headquarters: Bicholim
- Settlements: 2 cities 2 towns 22 villages

Government
  - Tehsildar: na
  - Lok Sabha constituency: na
  - Assembly constituency: na
  - MLA: na

Area
  - Taluka: 238.79 km^{2} (92.20 sq mi)

Population (2011)
  - Taluka: 97,955
  - Density: 410.21/km^{2} (1,062.4/sq mi)
  - Urban: 43.06%

Demographics
  - Literacy rate: 80.27%
  - Sex ratio: 962
- PIN: 4035XX
- Vehicle registration: GA-04
- Rain: na

Bicholim is a sub-district, also known as Taluka, located in the Northeastern part of North Goa district of Goa, India. There are 2 cities, 2 towns and 22 villages in Bicholim Taluka.

== Demographics ==
As per the 2011 Census of India, Bicholim Taluka has a population of 97,955 people. The sex-ratio of Bicholim Taluka is around 962 compared to 973 which is the state average of Goa. The literacy rate of Bicholim Taluka is 80.27% out of which 84.23% males are literate and 76.15% females are literate. The total area of Bicholim is 238.79 km^{2} with population density of 410 per km^{2}. Scheduled Castes and Scheduled Tribes make up 2.31% and 4.59% of the population respectively. 43.06% of the population lives in urban areas.

=== Religion ===
Religion in Bicholim Taluka (2011)
Religion	Percent
Hinduism	90.93%
Islam	7.12%
Christianity	1.72%
Other or not stated	0.23%

Hinduism is followed by the vast majority of population of Bicholim Taluka. Muslims and Christians are among the minorities. At the time of the 2011 Census of India, 90.93% of the population of the Taluka followed Hinduism, 7.12% Islam, 1.72% Christianity and 0.23% of the population followed other religions or did not state religion.

=== Languages ===
Konkani is the most spoken language in Bicholim Taluka. Marathi is also spoken by a significant minority.

Languages of Bicholim Taluka (2011)
1. Konkani (66.4%)
2. Marathi (18.6%)
3. Hindi (5.14%)
4. Kannada (3.43%)
5. Urdu (3.20%)
6. Others (3.29%)

At the time of 2011 Census of India, 66.38% of the population of Bicholim Taluka spoke Konkani, 18.56% Marathi, 5.14% Hindi, 3.43% Kannada and 3.20% Urdu as their first language.
