= Pale, Goa =

Pale
- Census town
- Location in Goa, India Pale (India)
- Coordinates: 15.35°N 73.87°E
- Country: India
- State: Goa
- District: North Goa
- Elevation: 0 m (0 ft)

Population (2001)
  - Total: 5,706

Languages
  - Official: Konkani
- Time zone: UTC+5:30 (IST)
- Vehicle registration: GA
- Website: goa.gov.in

Pale is a census town in South Goa in the Indian state of Goa.

== Geography ==
Pale is located at . It has an average elevation of 0 metres (0 feet).

== Demographics ==
As of 2001 India census, Pale had a population of 5706. Males constitute 53% of the population and females 47%. Pale has an average literacy rate of 75%, higher than the national average of 59.5%: male literacy is 82%, and female literacy is 67%. In Pale, 10% of the population is under 6 years of age.
