= Bicholim =

- Town
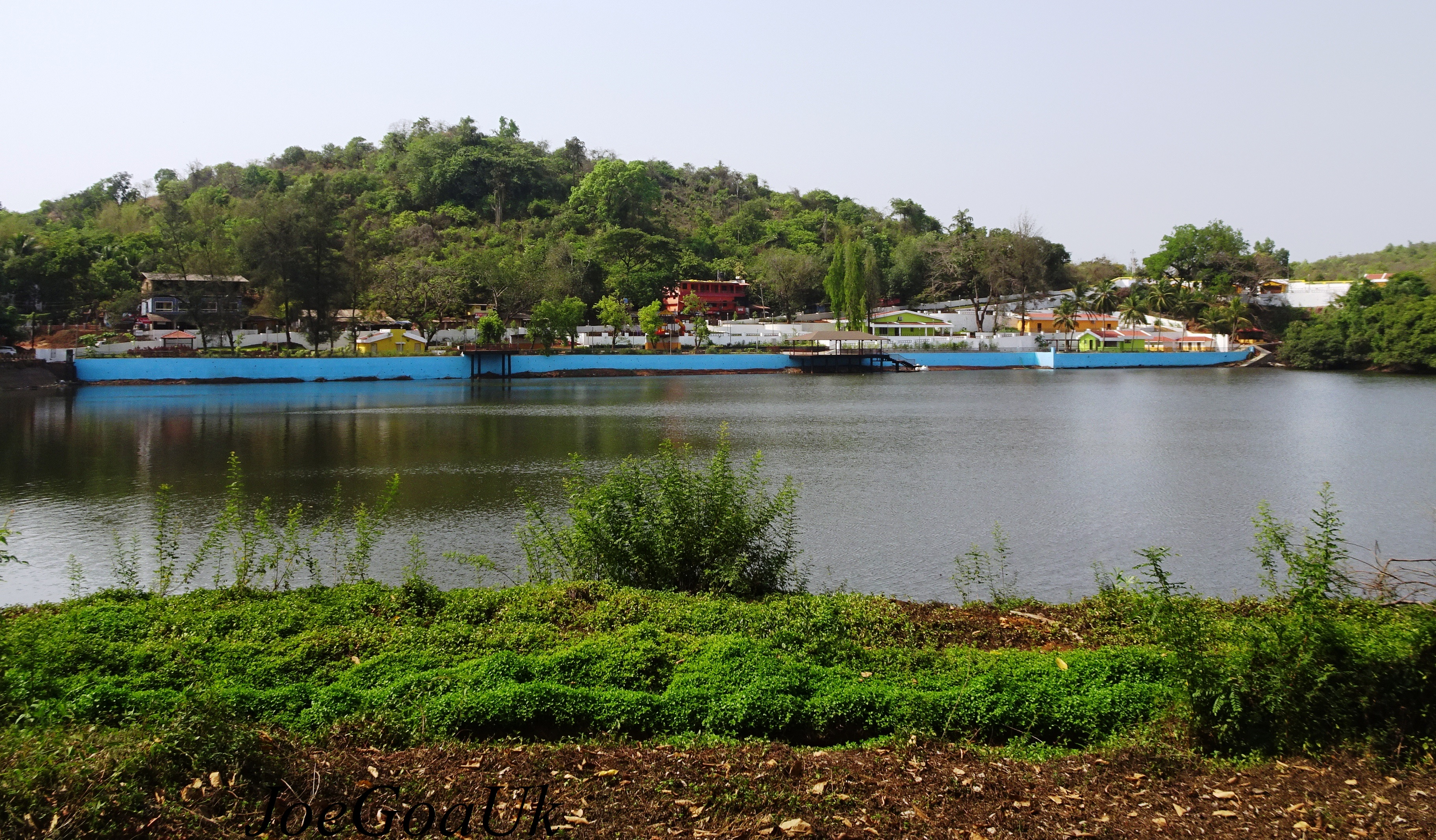
- Interactive map of Bicholim
- Location in Goa, India Bicholim (India)
- Coordinates: 15.60°N 73.95°E
- Country: India
- State: Goa
- District: North Goa

Government
  - MLA: Chandrakant Shetye
  - Councillor: Pundalik (Kundan) Falari
- Elevation: 22 m (72 ft)

Population (2011)
  - Total: 16,896

Languages
  - Official: Konkani
- Time zone: UTC+5:30 (IST)
- Postal Index Number: 403504
- Vehicle registration: GA 04
- Website: goa.gov.in

Bicholim (Konkani: Divchal; IPA: [ɖicoːlĩː]), is a small town and a municipal council in North Goa district in the state of Goa, India. It is the headquarters of the Concelho (county) of Bicholim, one of seven that make up the Novas Conquistas (New Conquests), territories added to Goa comparatively later than the first three of the Velhas Conquistas (Old Conquests). The town is located about 30 km (19 mi) from the state capital of Panaji. It is in the mining heartland of Goa.

== History ==
As per Hiregutti plates of Bhoja Asantika, a locality named Dipaka visaya in the copper plates dating 5th century CE, is identified with modern-day Divchali or Dicholi. It was under the rule of an independent Warlord (PrabhuDesai's of Sankhali/Sanquelim) It was taken over by Portuguese in late 18th century as part of New Conquest.

== Geography ==
Bicholim is located at 15.60°N 73.95°E. It has an average elevation of 22 metres (72 feet).

== Demographics ==
As of 2011 India census, Dicholi had a population of 16,986. Males constitute 52% of the population and females 48%. Dicholi has an average literacy rate of 82%. 10% of the population is under 6 years of age.

== Economy ==
Mining constitutes a major chunk in the economy of Bicholim with about 36% of the population working for a single iron ore mine owner, formerly Souza Mineralia Pvt. Ltd. owned by M.M.P. DeSouza who formed a partnership with the Dempos, the Dempo clan took over the mines underhandedly and it is now taken over by Sesa Goa which has been merged into Vedanta Resources of Anil Agarwal.

Wednesday is the market day where people in and around Bicholim gather in the main market region for trading small goods/commodities.

== Government and politics ==
Bicholim is part of Bicholim (Goa Assembly constituency) and North Goa (Lok Sabha constituency).

== Socio-political ==
Bicholim has three primary schools, four secondary schools, a polytechnic institute, a number of hospitals, temples, churches and mosques, and a protected site, pandava caves.

Some of the prominent temples are the Shanta Durga temple and the Mahadeva Temple. The Shanta Durga temple is close to the banks of the river, which is a tributary of river Mandovi.

The church of Our Lady of Grace dominates the town square. The high school run from the precincts of the church complex is one of the prominent schools of Bicholim.

A historic monument Nimuz ghar (possibly Namaz Ghar) stands on the hilltop prominently overlooking the town of Bicholim. The monument was built to commemorate the victory of the combined Muslim and Hindu forces over the Portuguese.

Another prominent landmark of the town is the Tribunal started by the Portuguese to deal with civil and criminal cases after the Nova Conquista.

As in other communities of Goa, Ganesh Chaturthi or Chawath is a celebrated with its own unique touch in Bicholim. A folk dance called "Ghode Modni" which has a cavalry theme is a specialty of Bicholim.

== Bicholim Industrial Estate ==
Set up by the Goa Industrial Development Department, the Bicholim Industrial Estate located on the banks of Mandovi tributary is home to more than 50 industrial workshops and manufacturing units specializing in a range of products and services such as Pottery, aluminium and steel fabrication, plastics, mining equipment, rolling mills, bus body, etc.

== Cudnem Village ==
Cudnem or Kudne is a large village situated on the left bank of the Cudnem River. It is located in Bicholim of North Goa district, Goa with total 763 families residing. The Cudnem village had a population of 3,308 of which 1,714 are males while 1,594 are females according to 2011 Indian census.

== Jainism ==
There are remains of Ancient Jain temples in Gujirwada in Cudnem village. Broken idols of Tirthankara were discovered during an excavation in 1986 by the directorate of archeology and archives. The Jain temple of Cudnem was constructed in the 10th century and was in ruins in the 15th century.

The idols of Tirthankara were also found in Chandreshwar temple in Kothambi village, situated on the right bank of the River Mandovi.

Naroa is situated on the left bank of the River Mandovi.

Broken sculptures of the Jain Tirthankara Suparshvanatha, belonging to the period of the Goan Kadamba ruler Shivachitta Permadi Dev, were discovered in an old Jain temple in Jainkot, Naroa.

The sculpture of Parshvanatha, the 23rd Tirthankara was discovered in Hindolewada, Naroa.

== See also ==
- Bicholim conflict, Wikipedia hoax
