= 2024 Indian general election in Dadra and Nagar Haveli and Daman and Diu =

- 7 May 2024

All 2 Dadra and Nagar Haveli and Daman and Diu seats in the Lok Sabha
- Opinion polls
- Turnout: 69.87%

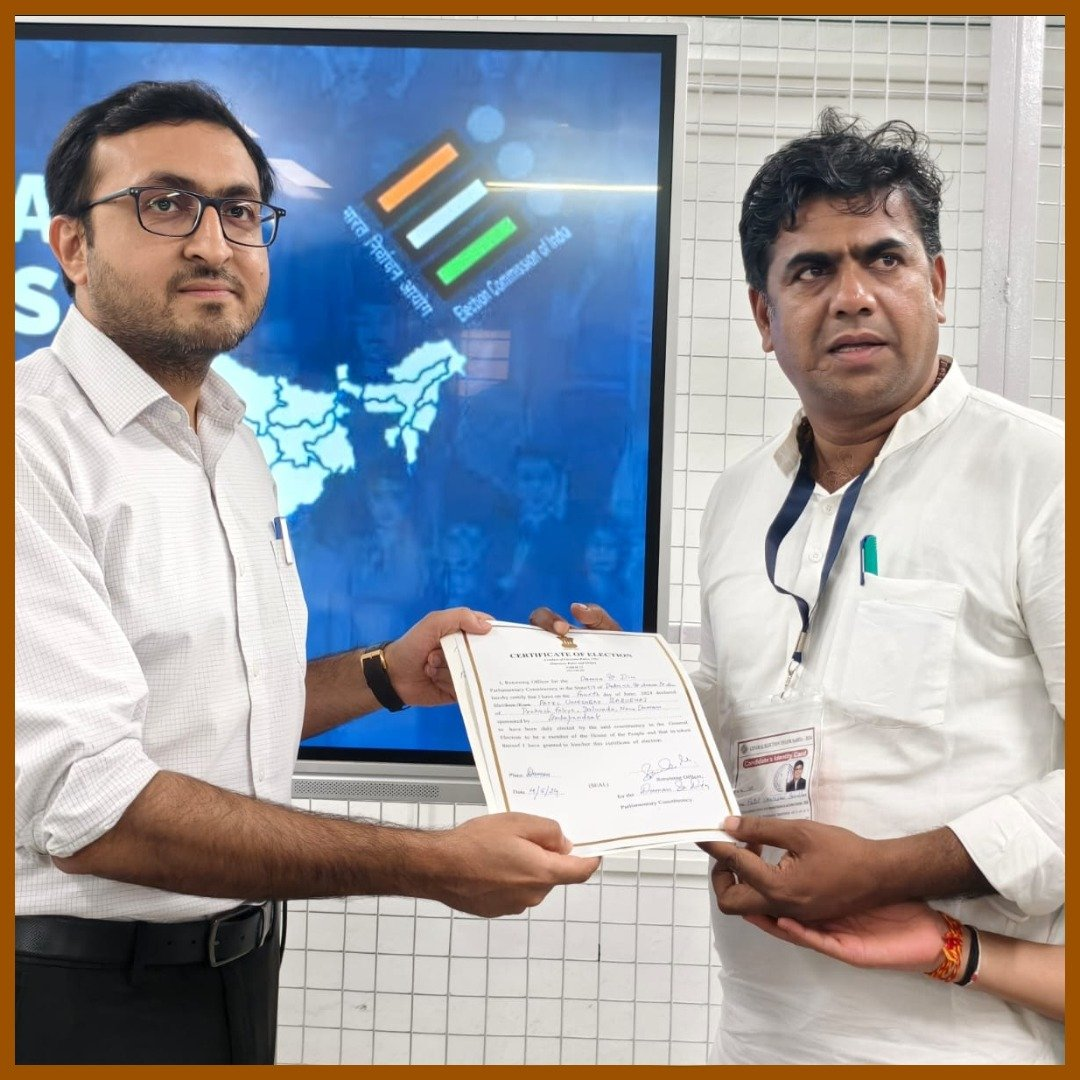
	First party	Second party
Leader	Deepesh Tandel	Umeshbhai Babubhai Patel
Party	BJP	Independent
Alliance	NDA
Leader since	2020	–
Leader's seat	Did not contest	Daman and Diu
Seats won	1	1
Seat change	Steady	Steady
Popular vote	157,076	42,523
Percentage	52.79%	14.29%
- Seatwise Result Map of the 2024 general election in Dadra and Nagar Haveli and Daman and Diu
Prime Minister before election
Narendra Modi
BJP
Prime Minister after election
Narendra Modi
BJP

The 2024 Indian general election was held in Dadra and Nagar Haveli and Daman and Diu on 7 May 2024 to elect two members of the 18th Lok Sabha. These elections are the first to take place in the union territory after it was formed on 2020 with the merger of the union territories of Dadra and Nagar Haveli and Daman and Diu.

== Election schedule ==
Poll event	Phase
Poll event	III
Notification date	12 April 2024
Last date for filing nomination	19 April 2024
Scrutiny of nomination	20 April 2024
Last Date for withdrawal of nomination	22 April 2024
Date of poll	7 May 2024
Date of counting of votes/Result	4 June 2024
No. of constituencies	2

== Parties and alliances ==
=== National Democratic Alliance ===
National Democratic Alliance

Party	Flag	Symbol	Leader	Seats contested
Bharatiya Janata Party			Lalubhai Patel	2

=== Indian National Developmental Inclusive Alliance ===
Indian National Developmental Inclusive Alliance

Party	Flag	Symbol	Leader	Seats contested
Indian National Congress			Ketan Dahyabhai Patel	2

=== Others ===
Party	Flag	Symbol	Leader	Seats contested
Bahujan Samaj Party			Borsa Sandipbhai Shankarbhai	1
Bharat Adivasi Party			Kurada Deepakbhai	1
Navsarjan Bharat Party				1
Total				3

== Candidates ==
Constituency					
Constituency		NDA		INDIA	
1.	Dadra and Nagar Haveli	BJP	Kalaben Delkar	INC	Ajit Ramjibhai Mahla
2	Daman and Diu	BJP	Lalubhai Patel	INC	Ketan Dahyabhai Patel

== Surveys and polls ==
=== Opinion polls ===
Polling agency	Date published	Margin of error				Lead
Polling agency	Date published	Margin of error	NDA	INDIA	Others	Lead
ABP News-CVoter	March 2024	±5%	2	0	0	NDA
Times Now-ETG	December 2023	±3%	2	0	0	NDA
India TV-CNX	October 2023	±3%	2	0	0	NDA
Times Now-ETG	September 2023	±3%	1-2	0-1	0	NDA
Times Now-ETG	August 2023	±3%	1-2	0-1	0	NDA

Polling agency	Date published	Margin of error				Lead
Polling agency	Date published	Margin of error	NDA	INDIA	Others	Lead
ABP News-CVoter	March 2024	±5%	52%	19%	29%	23

=== Exit polls ===
Polling agency				Lead
Polling agency	NDA	INDIA	Others	Lead
Actual results	1	0	1	Tie

== Results ==
=== Results by alliance or party ===
Alliance/ Party		Popular vote			Seats		
Alliance/ Party		Votes	%	±pp	Contested	Won	+/−
NDA	BJP	157,076	52.79%		2	1	Steady
INDIA	INC	74,660	25.09%		2	0	Steady
Others		13,889	4.67%		3	0	Steady
IND		45,790	15.90%		5	1	Steady
NOTA		6,121	2.06%				
Total		297,536	100%	-	12	2	-

=== Results by constituency ===
Constituency		Turnout	Winner					Runner-up					Margin
Constituency		Turnout	Party	Alliance	Candidate	Votes	%	Party	Alliance	Candidate	Votes	%	Margin
1.	Dadra and Nagar Haveli (ST)	72.52%▼	BJP	NDA	Kalaben Delkar	1,21,074	58.89%	INC	INDIA	Ajit Mahala	63,490	30.88%	57,584
2	Daman and Diu	68.77%▼	Independent	Independent	Umesh Babubhai Patel	42,523	46.02%	BJP	NDA	Lalubhai Patel	36,298	39.28%	6,225

== See also ==
- 2024 Indian general election in Delhi
- 2024 Indian general election in Goa
- 2024 Indian general election in Gujarat
