= 1987 Daman and Diu by-election =

1987 Daman and Diu elections

1 new seat to the Lok Sabha
	First party
Party	INC

In May 1987 the Indian Union Territory of Goa, Daman and Diu was bifurcated, as Goa attained statehood. Daman and Diu became a Union Territory of its own. Subsequently a by-election for a new Daman and Diu seat in the Lok Sabha (lower house of the Parliament of India) was held on November 7, 1987. The by-election was won by the Indian National Congress candidate Gopal Kalan Tandel, who obtained 17,027 votes. Narayan Srinivasa Fugro, standing as an independent, finished in second place with 9,303 votes. There were also five other candidates in the fray, who all lost their deposits; M.B. Madhavbhai (independent, 852 votes), M.G. Ramzan (independent, 469 votes), B.R. Bhikabhai (NPI, 343 votes), D.B. Mohanlal (independent, 255 votes) and F.A. Anton (independent, 243 votes).
