= Antonio Vas =

Indian politician (born 1964)

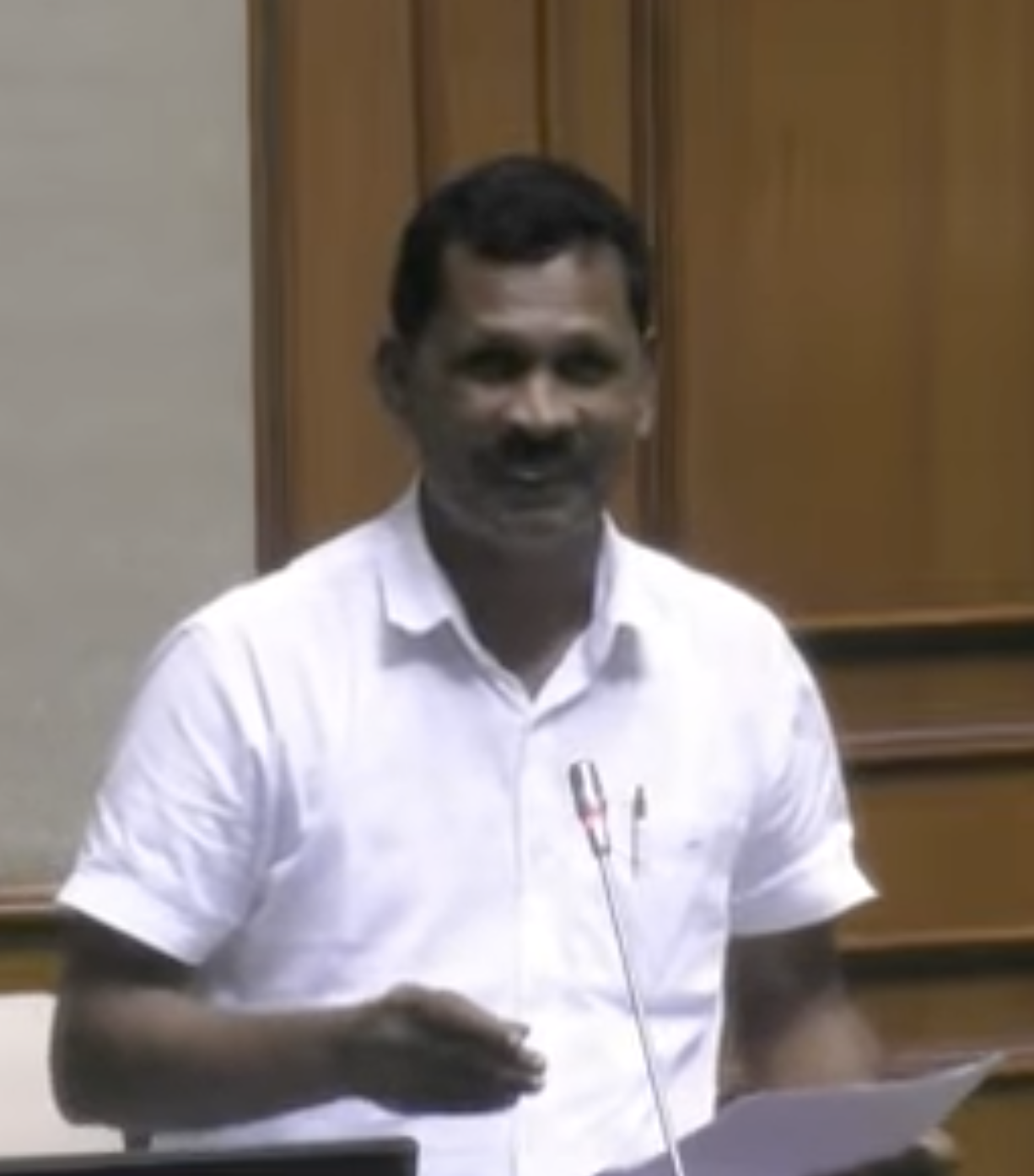
- Vas in 2024

Member of Goa Legislative Assembly
- Incumbent
- Assumed office 10 March 2022
- Preceded by: Alina Saldanha
- Constituency: Cortalim

Personal details
- Born: 29 December 1964 (age 61) Goa, India
- Party: Independent
- Education: Our Lady of Perpetual Succor High School, Cortalim (S.S.C)
- Occupation: Politician
- Profession: Bus operator; fish trader

Antonio Vas (born 29 December 1964) is an Indian politician who serves as a member of the Goa Legislative Assembly, representing the Cortalim Assembly constituency. He contested as an independent candidate in the 2022 Goa Legislative Assembly election and emerged victorious by defeating two term Aam Aadmi Party MLA, Alina Saldanha by a margin of 4,167 votes.

== Early and personal life ==
Antonio Vas was born to Mateus Vas in Goa. He completed his Secondary School Certificate from Our Lady of Perpetual Succor High School, Cortalim in 1986. He currently resides at Arvale, Cortalim, Goa. He is a bus operator and fish trader by profession.
