= Dahyabhai Vallabhbhai Patel =

Indian politician

Dahyabhai V. Patel

Member of the Lok Sabha
- In office 6 October 1999 — 16 May 2009
- Preceded by: Devjibhai Tandel
- Succeeded by: Lalubhai Patel
- Constituency: Daman and Diu

Personal details
- Born: 10 March 1945 Daman and Diu
- Died: 3 May 2021 (aged 76) Daman
- Party: INC
- Spouse: Chanchal Ben
- Children: 3
- As of 16 September, 2006

Dahyabhai V. Patel (born 10 March 1945 – 3 May 2021) was a member of the 14th Lok Sabha and 15th Lok Sabha of India. He represented the Daman and Diu constituency and is a member of the Indian National Congress (INC) political party.

== Personal life ==
Dahyabhai Patel was born in a Agriculturist Koli family on Daman and Diu. He was married to Chanchal Ben and had 2 sons and 1 daughter.
