= Dayanand Narvekar =

Indian politician (born 1950)

3rd Deputy Chief Minister of Goa
- In office 24 November 1999 – 23 October 2000
- Preceded by: Wilfred de Souza
- Succeeded by: Ravi Naik

Speaker of Goa Legislative Assembly
- In office 1985–1989
- Preceded by: Froilano Machado
- Succeeded by: Luis Proto Barbosa

Member of Goa Legislative Assembly
- In office 2002–2012
- Preceded by: Ulhas Asnodkar
- Succeeded by: Glenn Ticlo
- Constituency: Aldona

Member of the Goa Legislative Assembly
- In office 1994–2002
- Preceded by: Vinayak Vitthal Naik
- Succeeded by: Sadanand Tanavade
- Constituency: Thivim

Member of the Goa Legislative Assembly
- In office 1977–1989
- Preceded by: Punaji Achrekar
- Succeeded by: Vinayak Vitthal Naik
- Constituency: Thivim

Personal details
- Born: 11 February 1950 (age 76) Goa, Portuguese India

Dayanand Ganesh Narvekar (born 11 February 1950) is an Indian politician who served as third Deputy Chief Minister of Goa from 1999 to 2000. He also served as the Speaker of the Goa Legislative Assembly from 1985 to 1989. A former Finance Minister, Narvekar was a member of the Indian National Congress for 35 years. He is currently a member of the Aam Aadmi Party, having joined the party ahead of the 2022 legislative assembly elections.
