= List of states and union territories of India by voters =

This is a list of states and union territories of India by the number of voters polled in the fifteen Lok Sabha elections between 1951 and 2009, based on data released by the Election Commission of India. In the 2009 general election, the Indian electorate was estimated to total approximately 714 million individuals, out of whom around 415 million cast a vote.

== List ==
Voters in Lok Sabha elections
State / Union Territory	1951	1957	1962	1967	1971	1977	1980	1984	1989	1991	1996	1998	1999	2004	2009	2014
Andaman & Nicobar	—N/a	—N/a	—N/a	36,924	44,531	60,590	81,146	91,093	115,403	108,822	130,918	147,698	147,102	153,841	169,535	190,328
Andhra Pradesh (Hyderabad)	4,854,862	9,531,373	12,302,352	14,124,097	13,420,873	17,220,943	17,363,759	23,136,116	29,916,616	26,176,731	31,196,679	32,425,649	34,332,073	35,776,275	41,865,931	48,358,545
Arunachal Pradesh	—N/a	—N/a	—N/a	—N/a	—N/a	52,764	182,909	240,762	281,665	266,324	299,680	334,705	441,231	385,446	499,579	596,956
Ajmer	178,999	—N/a	—N/a	—N/a	—N/a	—N/a	—N/a	—N/a	—N/a	—N/a	—N/a	—N/a	—N/a	—N/a	—N/a	—N/a
Assam	2,647,127	2,292,612	2,607,519	3,157,355	3,177,170	3,965,448	645,560	7,815,702	Unknown	8,935,495	9,880,989	8,717,775	10,182,919	10,377,354	12,141,171	15,085,883
Bhopal	169,457	—N/a	—N/a	—N/a	—N/a	—N/a	—N/a	—N/a	—N/a	—N/a	—N/a	—N/a	—N/a	—N/a	—N/a	—N/a
Bihar	9,992,451	10,007,876	10,386,746	14,289,861	15,186,628	21,264,278	20,600,067	25,484,520	31,441,378	30,449,327	34,744,087	37,963,068	36,143,272	29,332,306	24,232,597	35,885,366
Bilaspur	68,130	—N/a	—N/a	—N/a	—N/a	—N/a	—N/a	—N/a	—N/a	—N/a	—N/a	—N/a	—N/a	—N/a	—N/a	—N/a
Chandigarh	—N/a	—N/a	—N/a	49,829	73,418	108,494	125,944	158,050	219,697	215,637	263,189	285,149	282,879	269,849	345,538	453,455
Chhattisgarh	—N/a	—N/a	—N/a	—N/a	—N/a	—N/a	—N/a	—N/a	—N/a	—N/a	—N/a	—N/a	—N/a	7,146,189	8,497,792	12,255,579
Coorg	63,813	—N/a	—N/a	—N/a	—N/a	—N/a	—N/a	—N/a	—N/a	—N/a	—N/a	—N/a	—N/a	—N/a	—N/a	—N/a
Dadra & Nagar Haveli	—N/a	—N/a	—N/a	23,144	23,037	25,706	33,378	40,331	54,200	49,863	73,032	74,205	73,507	84,703	110,348	165,286
Daman & Diu	—N/a	—N/a	—N/a	286,050	243,341	Unknown	Unknown	Unknown	37,451	38,786	49,606	52,389	51,811	55,591	67,997	87,233
Delhi	655,900	811,344	924,885	1,170,743	1,314,480	1,816,372	1,991,869	2,254,869	3,096,655	2,946,814	4,079,296	4,255,606	3,793,697	4,126,443	5,750,309	8,271,766
Goa	—N/a	—N/a	—N/a	—N/a	—N/a	299,786	363,126	421,257	427,065	319,727	489,547	538,664	409,944	553,105	564,255	817,000
Gujarat	—N/a	—N/a	5,526,904	6,818,682	6,401,309	8,353,883	9,141,539	10,916,331	13,281,560	10,950,062	10,248,650	17,062,837	13,878,611	15,213,501	17,472,865	25,824,003
Haryana	—N/a	—N/a	—N/a	3,185,295	3,068,699	4,224,405	4,476,526	5,163,799	6,207,111	6,403,796	7,860,863	7,649,088	7,029,964	8,097,064	8,156,553	11,495,150
Himachal Pradesh	—N/a	—N/a	—N/a	1,582,315	1,708,667	1,961,050	2,175,326	2,314,024	2,983,359	3,076,182	3,536,517	3,628,864	3,786,479	4,181,995	2,690,290	3,098,501
Jammu & Kashmir	—N/a	—N/a	—N/a	872,104	1,219,085	1,479,514	1,377,988	2,258,113	1,066,879	Unknown	2,181,594	2,220,371	1,626,945	Unknown	2,607,335	3,566,863
Jharkhand	—N/a	—N/a	—N/a	—N/a	—N/a	—N/a	—N/a	—N/a	—N/a	—N/a	—N/a	—N/a	—N/a	9,363,363	9,122,151	12,982,940
Karnataka (Mysore)	2,824,427	5,798,440	6,733,403	8,044,053	7,917,061	10,596,342	11,289,532	13,857,272	19,320,008	15,807,311	19,155,432	21,488,648	23,168,337	25,139,122	24,544,066	31,038,888
Kerala	—N/a	6,050,246	5,645,940	6,517,765	6,593,446	9,077,000	8,246,713	11,011,029	15,007,250	14,413,243	14,701,014	14,972,844	15,482,676	15,093,960	15,993,463	17,975,893
Kutch	119,580	—N/a	—N/a	—N/a	—N/a	—N/a	—N/a	—N/a	—N/a	—N/a	—N/a	—N/a	—N/a	—N/a	—N/a	—N/a
Laccadive, Minicoy, and Amindivi Islands	Unknown	Unknown	Unknown	11,897	—N/a	—N/a	—N/a	—N/a	—N/a	—N/a	—N/a	—N/a	—N/a	—N/a	—N/a	—N/a
Lakshadweep	—N/a	—N/a	—N/a	—N/a	—N/a	16,480	17,860	19,105	25,555	25,449	30,373	31,264	30,174	31,820	39,509	43,239
Madhya Bharat	1,953,571	—N/a	—N/a	—N/a	—N/a	—N/a	—N/a	—N/a	—N/a	—N/a	—N/a	—N/a	—N/a	—N/a	—N/a	—N/a
Madhya Pradesh	7,192,591	7,614,222	7,109,378	9,833,743	9,397,900	12,512,691	13,058,719	16,190,117	20,368,256	16,726,540	23,748,322	27,541,607	25,746,824	18,463,451	19,359,320	29,693,796
Maharashtra	11,528,290	16,760,285	11,721,955	14,391,706	14,391,012	17,404,823	19,018,800	22,451,250	28,256,668	23,708,067	28,979,021	32,096,449	34,660,007	34,263,317	36,963,831	48,718,844
Manipur	152,467	174,091	Unknown	324,796	265,495	473,895	742,442	869,614	875,158	858,194	968,783	755,960	901,242	1,035,696	1,338,561	1,412,637
Meghalaya	—N/a	—N/a	—N/a	—N/a	—N/a	264,544	115,575	409,212	486,967	506,636	673,372	860,890	661,657	679,321	822,325	1,078,058
Mizoram	—N/a	—N/a	252,965	Unknown	Unknown	102,075	129,533	Unknown	228,202	242,999	299,593	307,767	293,513	349,799	318,981	433,201
Nagaland	—N/a	—N/a	264,770	0	148,125	250,016	294,009	394,820	607,429	628,015	772,402	420,714	728,843	955,690	1,189,012	1,038,910
Odisha	3,659,493	4,440,490	2,070,142	4,318,749	4,693,064	5,603,842	6,413,550	8,407,165	11,523,099	10,656,213	13,277,697	13,574,771	13,456,534	16,945,092	17,747,370	21,532,275
Patiala and East Punjab States Union	1,475,112	—N/a	—N/a	—N/a	—N/a	—N/a	—N/a	—N/a	—N/a	—N/a	—N/a	—N/a	—N/a	—N/a	—N/a	—N/a
Puducherry	—N/a	—N/a	—N/a	162,193	172,992	219,560	256,539	275,654	383,306	401,741	477,437	417,786	444,174	484,336	607,641	740,017
Punjab	4,992,338	7,183,830	7,028,778	4,489,663	4,163,167	5,725,795	6,103,192	7,232,374	8,114,095	Unknown	9,019,302	9,217,254	8,819,200	10,233,165	11,832,399	13,84
TamilNadu	N/A	N/A	N/A	N/A	N/A	N/A	N/A	N/A	N/A	N/A	N/A	N/A	N/A	N/A	N/A	N/A

== See also ==
- Elections in India
