= List of speakers of the Goa Legislative Assembly =

Presiding officer of the unicameral Goa Legislature of India

Speaker of the Goa Legislative Assembly
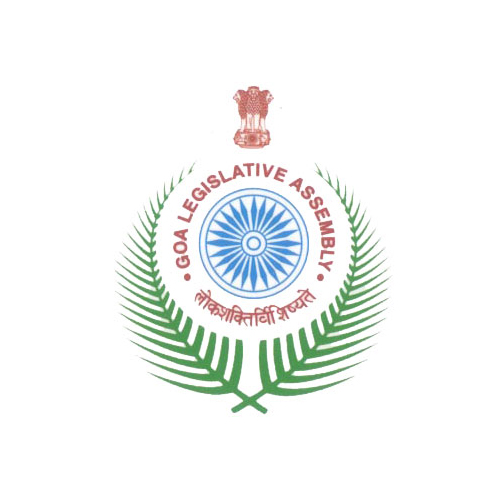
- Seal of Goa
- Incumbent; Vacant since August 2025
- Goa Legislative Assembly
- Style: The Hon’ble (formal); Mr. Speaker (informal)
- Member of: Goa Legislative Assembly
- Reports to: Government of Goa
- Residence: Panaji
- Appointer: Members of the Legislative Assembly
- Term length: During the life of the Goa Legislative Assembly (five years maximum)
- Deputy: List of deputy speakers of the Goa Legislative Assembly

The Speaker of the Goa Legislative Assembly is the title given to the presiding officer (chair) of the Goa Legislative Assembly. The speaker's official role is to moderate debate, make rulings on procedure, announce the results of votes, etc. The speaker decides who may speak and has the powers to discipline members who break the procedures of the Assembly. The speaker often also represents the body in person, as the voice of the body in ceremonial and some other situations. Many bodies also have a speaker pro tempore or deputy speaker, designated to fill in when the speaker is not available.

== List of speakers ==
Assembly	Name	Party	Tenure	
Assembly	Name	Party	Term start	Term end
	Pandurang Purushottam Shirodkar	MGP	10 January 1964	11 April 1967
	Gopal Kamat	MGP	13 April 1967	23 March 1972
	Narayan Fugro	Independent	24 March 1972	20 January 1980
	Froilano Machado	INC	21 January 1980	22 March 1984
	Dayanand Narvekar	INC	5 April 1984	16 September 1989
	Luis Proto Barbosa	INC	22 January 1990	14 April 1990
	Surendra Sirsat	MGP	26 April 1990	4 April 1991
	Sheikh Hassan Haroon	INC	26 July 1991	15 January 1995
	Tomazinho Cardozo	INC	16 January 1995	14 June 1999
	Pratapsingh Rane	INC	15 June 1999	11 June 2002
	Vishwas Satarkar	BJP	12 June 2002	28 February 2005
	Francisco Sardinha (pro-tem)	INC	28 February 2005	8 July 2005
	Francisco Sardinha	INC	8 July 2005	11 June 2007
5th	Pratapsingh Rane	INC	15 June 2007	6 March 2012
6th	Rajendra Arlekar	BJP	16 March 2012	1 October 2015
6th	Anant Shet	BJP	12 January 2016	11 March 2017
7th	Pramod Sawant	BJP	22 March 2017	19 March 2019
7th	Rajesh Patnekar	BJP	1 July 2019	10 March 2022
8th	Ramesh Tawadkar	BJP	29 March 2022	21 August 2025
8th	Ganesh Gaonkar (pro-tem)	BJP	25 September 2025	Incumbent

== Election of the speaker ==
In the Vidhan Sabha, a simple majority vote in the Assembly in which all present members participate determine both the speaker and the deputy speaker — the presiding officers — who are also its members.

The party in power proposes the name of their candidate after its candidate after titular hearings with Leaders of other Parties who are a part of the Assembly. This ensures that the speaker is accepted by all political parties belonging to the Assembly. The name of the candidate determined by the party in power is usually proposed by the chief minister or the minister for parliamentary affairs. The pro-tem speaker chairs the session in which the election for the post of the speaker takes place.

The deputy speaker chairs sessions where the election takes place towards the end of a Vidhan Sabha. Once the election is over, the person who is presiding declares the chosen candidate to be Speaker of the Assembly, without latter motions being voted upon. Once the final tally of votes is declared, the chief minister and leader of the opposition escort the speaker elect to the chair. His speech, in which he thanks the Assembly, marks the start of the tenure of the new speaker.

=== Qualifications required ===
The speaker of the West Bengal Vidhan Sabha has to be an MLA.

To become the speaker of the West Bengal Vidhan Sabha, a person must be a citizen of India, not less than 25 years of age. He should be mentally sound and should not be bankrupt. He should also state an affidavit that there are no criminal procedures against him.

The speaker is elected by other members of the Vidhan Sabha and is responsible for the conduct of business of the body. A deputy speaker to also elected to preside during the speaker's absence. The speaker acts as a neutral judge and manages all debates and discussions in the Assembly.

The speaker can also initiate a motion of no confidence against the government in the state. If it is passed by a majority vote, then the chief minister and his council of ministers must collectively resign.

The speaker is supposed to resign from his original party because as a speaker, he has to remain impartial.

== Deputy Speaker ==
The Deputy Speaker of the Goa Legislative Assembly is the second-highest-ranking officer of the Goa Legislative Assembly. The Deputy Speaker presides over the house in the absence of the Speaker.

As of January 2026, Joshua De Souza of the Bharatiya Janata Party serves as the Deputy Speaker, having assumed office on 22 July 2022.

=== List of Deputy Speakers ===
The following is a chronological list of Deputy Speakers of the Goa Legislative Assembly:

No.	Name	Term of Office		Party
1	Atchut Sinai Usgaonkar	15 January 1964	28 March 1966	Maharashtrawadi Gomantak Party
2	Mamdali Jiwani	1 April 1966	2 December 1966	Maharashtrawadi Gomantak Party
...	...	...	...	...
20	Michael Lobo	24 March 2017	13 July 2019	Bharatiya Janata Party
21	Isidore Fernandes	25 July 2019	21 January 2022	Bharatiya Janata Party
22	Subhash Phal Desai	30 March 2022	8 April 2022	Bharatiya Janata Party
23	Joshua De Souza	22 July 2022	Present	Bharatiya Janata Party

=== Notes ===
- Joshua De Souza was elected with a majority of 24–12 votes against Siolim Congress MLA Delilah Lobo on 22 July 2022.
- As of January 2026, he serves under Speaker Ganesh Gaonkar, who took office in September 2025.

== Role in the Legislative Assembly ==
The speaker presides over the sessions of the Vidhan Sabha and conducts the business in the Assembly. He decides whether a bill is a money bill or a non-money bill. He maintains discipline and decorum in the Assembly and can punish a member for their unruly behaviour by suspending them. He permits the moving of various kinds of motions and resolutions like the motion of no confidence, motion of adjournment, motion of censure and calling attention notice as per the rules. The speaker decides on the agenda to be taken up for discussion during the meeting. The date of election of the speaker is fixed by the governor.

Although the members of Vidhan Sabha represent their constituencies, the speaker represents the whole Assembly.

While the office of Speaker is vacant, the duties of the office are performed by the deputy speaker or, if the office of deputy speaker is also vacant, by such member of the Assembly as the governor may appoint for the purpose.

During the absence of the speaker from any sitting of the Assembly the deputy speaker or, if he is also absent, such person as may be determined by the Assembly, or, if no such person is present, such other person as may be determined by the Assembly, shall act as speaker.

== Term of office ==
The term of office of the speaker ranges from the day he is elected to the dissolution of the Vidhan Sabha. When the Assembly is dissolved, the speaker terminates his tenure as a member of the Assembly, but does not quit his position as Speaker. He stands eligible for re-election.

A member holding office as speaker or deputy speaker of an Assembly shall vacate his office if his tenure as member of the Assembly is terminated; or may at any time by writing under his hand addressed, if such members is the speaker, to the deputy speaker, and if such member is the deputy speaker, to the speaker, resign his office; and may be removed from his office by a resolution of the Assembly provided that no resolution shall be moved unless at least fourteen days' notice has been given.

Further, whenever the Assembly is dissolved, the speaker shall not vacate his office until immediately prior to the Vidhan Sabha's first meeting after the dissolution.

At any sitting of the Legislative Assembly, while any resolution for the removal of the speaker from his office is under consideration, the speaker, or while any resolution for the removal of the deputy speaker from his office is under consideration, the deputy speaker, shall not, though he is present, preside, and during the absence of the speaker from any sitting of the Assembly the deputy speaker in relation to every such sitting as they apply in relation to a sitting from which the speaker or, as the case may be, the deputy speaker, is absent.

The speaker shall have the right to speak and take part in discussions in the Legislative Assembly while any resolution for his removal from office is under consideration in the Assembly and shall be entitled to vote only in the first instance on such resolution or on any other matter during such proceedings but not in the case of an equality of votes.

== Pro tem Speaker ==
=== List of Pro tem Speakers ===
- Sidharth Kuncalienkar 2012
- Ganesh Gaonkar 2022
