= Glenn Ticlo =

Indian politician (born 1962)

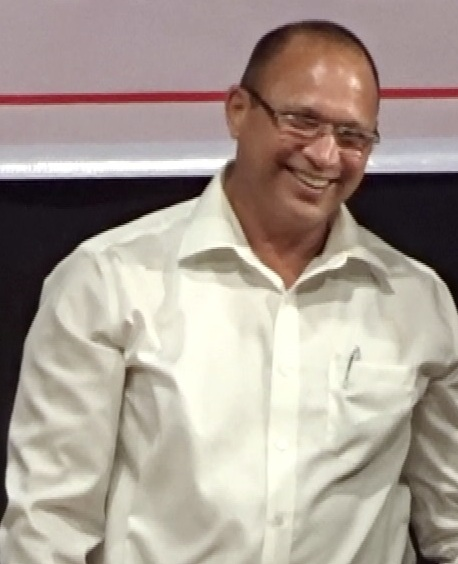
- Ticlo in 2017

Member of the Goa Legislative Assembly
- In office 2012–2022
- Preceded by: Dayanand Narvekar
- Succeeded by: Carlos Alvares Ferreira
- Constituency: Aldona

Personal details
- Born: Glenn John Vijay Ambrose e Souza Ticlo; 12 March 1962 (age 64) Aden Colony
- Party: Bharatiya Janata Party
- Occupation: Politician

Glenn John Vijay Ambrose e Souza Ticlo (born 12 March 1962) is an Indian politician who was a two-term member of the Goa Legislative Assembly, representing the Aldona constituency from 2012 to 2022.

== Early life ==
Glenn John Vijay Ambrose e Souza Ticlo was born on 12 March 1962 in Aden Colony (now Yemen).

== Posts ==
He is the chairman of the Goa Industrial Development Corporation.

== Committees ==
Ticlo was a member of the following committees in the house.

- Chairman Committee On Government Assurances
- Member Committee On Public Undertakings
- Member Select Committee on The Goa Land Use
- Member Select Committee on The Goa Commission for Minorities

== Controversy ==
A section of media reportedly alleged that Ticlo was a Portuguese national.
