= Alina Saldanha =

Indian politician

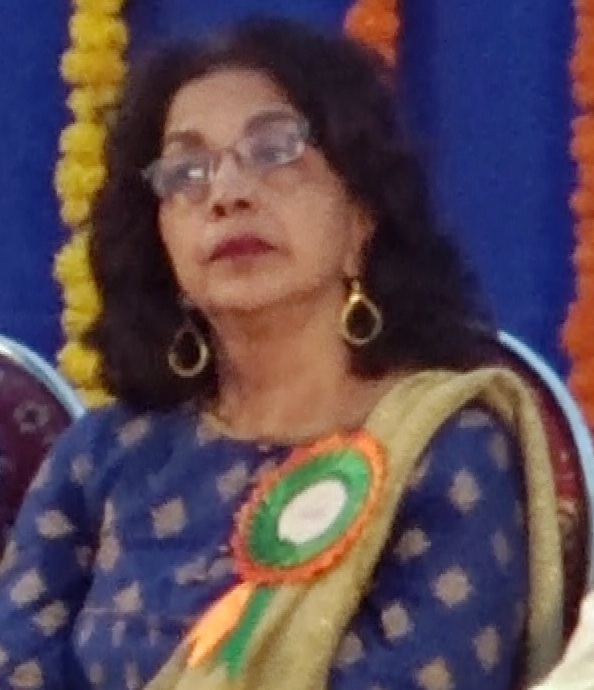
- Saldanha in 2017

Minister of Rural Development Museum Science & Technology Environment in the Goa Government
- In office 2012–2014

Personal details
- Party: Independent
- Other political affiliations: Bharatiya Janata Party (till 2021)
- Spouse: José Matanhy de Saldanha (died 2012)
- Occupation: Politician

Alina Saldanha is an Indian politician. She is former member of the Goa Legislative Assembly representing the Cortalim constituency.

== Political career ==
She entered politics after the death of her husband José Matanhy de Saldanha in 2012, he was the sitting member of the Goa Legislative Assembly representing the Cortalim constituency. She fought the by poll from his seat.

== Ministry ==
She was the only woman Minister in the Laxmikant Parsekar led government in Goa.

== Portfolios ==
She is in charge of environment.
