= Luis Proto Barbosa =

Indian politician (1927–2011)

- Portrait of Luis Proto Barbosa

3rd Chief Minister of Goa
- In office 14 April 1990 – 14 December 1990
- Preceded by: Churchill Alemao
- Succeeded by: Ravi Naik

Member of the Goa Legislative Assembly
- In office 1989–1994
- Preceded by: constituency established
- Succeeded by: Radharao Gracias
- Constituency: Loutolim
- In office 1984–1989
- Preceded by: Froilano Machado
- Succeeded by: Mauvin Godinho
- Constituency: Cortalim
- In office 1963–1977
- Preceded by: constituency established
- Succeeded by: Froilano Machado
- Constituency: Cortalim

Speaker of the Goa Legislative Assembly
- In office January 1990 – April 1990
- Preceded by: Dayanand Narvekar
- Succeeded by: Surendra Sirsat

Personal details
- Born: 11 January 1927 Goa, Portuguese India
- Died: 6 October 2011 (aged 84) Margao, Goa, India
- Party: Indian National Congress

Luis Proto Barbosa (11 January 1927 – 6 October 2011), also known as Poto Barboz, was an Indian politician and physician who served as the third Chief Minister of Goa from April to December 1990. Barbosa was a member of the Indian National Congress. He played a significant role in the historic Goa Opinion Poll of 1967. He was one of the members elected to the first legislative assembly of Goa, Daman and Diu. Barbosa headed a coalition government of 6 Congress defectors by joining in a coalition with the much larger 18 member Maharashtrawadi Gomantak Party.

== Legacy ==
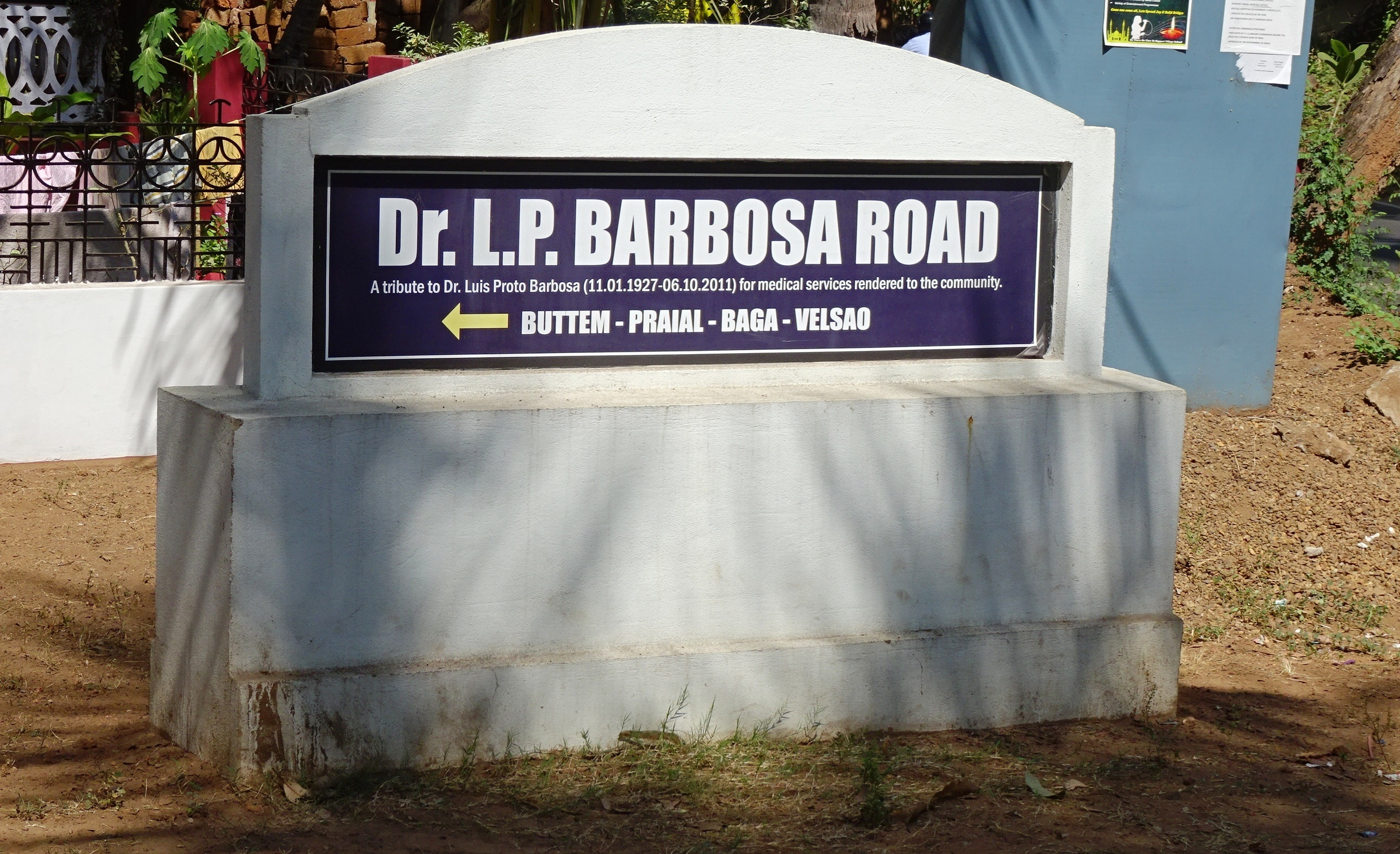
Dr. Luis Proto Barbosa Road

A road in Arossim was named after him.

Preceded by Churchill Alemao	Chief Minister of Goa; 1990	Succeeded by President's rule
