= Aldona Assembly constituency =

Constituency of the Goa legislative assembly in India

Coordinates: 15.59°N 73.87°E

Aldona
- Constituency No. 10 for the Goa Legislative Assembly

Constituency details
- Country: India
- Region: Western India
- State: Goa
- District: North Goa
- Lok Sabha constituency: North Goa
- Established: 1963
- Total electors: 28,994
- Reservation: None

Member of Legislative Assembly
- 8th Goa Legislative Assembly
- Incumbent Carlos Alvares Ferreira
- Party: Indian National Congress

Aldona is one of the 40 Goa Legislative Assembly constituencies of the state of Goa in southern India. Aldona is also one of the 20 constituencies falling under North Goa Lok Sabha constituency.

== Members of the Legislative Assembly ==
Year	Member	Party
1963	Lobo Sequeira Orlando	United Goans Party
1967	Lobo Sequeira Orlando	United Goans Party
1972	José Silveiro Sousa	United Goans Party
1989	Ratnakar Chopdekar	Maharashtrawadi Gomantak Party
1994	Fatima D'Sa	Indian National Congress
1999	Ulhas Asnodkar	Bharatiya Janata Party
2002	Dayanand Narvekar	Indian National Congress
2007	Dayanand Narvekar	Indian National Congress
2012	Glenn Ticlo	Bharatiya Janata Party
2017	Glenn Ticlo	Bharatiya Janata Party
2022	Carlos Alvares Ferreira	Indian National Congress

== Election results ==
=== 2027 Assembly election ===
2027 Goa Legislative Assembly election: Aldona
Party	Candidate	Votes	%	±%
INC				
NDA				
NOTA	None of the above			
Majority				
Turnout				
gain from		Swing		

=== Assembly Election 2022 ===
2022 Goa Legislative Assembly election : Aldona
Party	Candidate	Votes	%	±%
INC	Carlos Alvares Ferreira	9,320	41.43%	▲18.52
BJP	Glenn Ticlo	7,497	33.33%	▼10.20
AITC	Kiran Kandolkar	3,647	16.21%	New
AAP	Mahesh Satelkar	1,306	5.81%	▼9.34
SS	Govind Govenkar	350	1.56%	New
NOTA	None of the Above	260	1.16%	▲0.25
Margin of victory		1,823	8.10%	▼12.52
Turnout		22,496	77.60%	▼1.15
Registered electors		28,991		▲5.66
INC gain from BJP		Swing	▼2.10	

=== Assembly Election 2017 ===
2017 Goa Legislative Assembly election : Aldona
Party	Candidate	Votes	%	±%
BJP	Glenn Ticlo	9,405	43.53%	▼12.17
INC	Amarnath Panjikar	4,949	22.91%	▼15.68
AAP	Rosy Ursula D`Souza	3,272	15.14%	New
MGP	Mahesh Vithu Satelkar	3,000	13.89%	New
Independent	Anandrao Narayanrao Nagvenkar	643	2.98%	New
NOTA	None of the Above	196	0.91%	New
NCP	Osbert D`Cunha	141	0.65%	New
Margin of victory		4,456	20.62%	▲3.51
Turnout		21,606	78.74%	▼2.15
Registered electors		27,439		▲9.27
BJP hold		Swing	▼12.17	

=== Assembly Election 2012 ===
2012 Goa Legislative Assembly election : Aldona
Party	Candidate	Votes	%	±%
BJP	Glenn Ticlo	11,315	55.70%	▲27.13
INC	Dayanand Narvekar	7,839	38.59%	▼3.93
AITC	Wilfred D'Souza	643	3.17%	New
Independent	Ravindra Vasudev Panjikar	256	1.26%	New
Goa Su-Raj Party	Julius Pereira	236	1.16%	▼0.83
Margin of victory		3,476	17.11%	▲3.17
Turnout		20,314	80.79%	▲12.02
Registered electors		25,112		▼20.51
BJP gain from INC		Swing	▲13.18	

=== Assembly Election 2007 ===
2007 Goa Legislative Assembly election : Aldona
Party	Candidate	Votes	%	±%
INC	Dayanand Narvekar	9,251	42.52%	▼8.13
BJP	Kunda Chodankar	6,217	28.57%	▼11.84
Independent	Fermeena Khaunte	5,298	24.35%	New
Goa Su-Raj Party	Floriano Conceicao Lobo	433	1.99%	▲0.12
Independent	Salgaonkar Narcinva	154	0.71%	New
Independent	Nagvenkar Anandrao Narayanrao	144	0.66%	New
Margin of victory		3,034	13.94%	▲3.70
Turnout		21,757	68.86%	▲3.15
Registered electors		31,592		▲5.62
INC hold		Swing	▼8.13	

=== Assembly Election 2002 ===
2002 Goa Legislative Assembly election : Aldona
Party	Candidate	Votes	%	±%
INC	Dayanand Narvekar	9,957	50.65%	▲35.41
BJP	Ulhas Asnodkar	7,944	40.41%	▲3.74
NCP	Fernandes Joao Rosario Joaquim	1,116	5.68%	New
Goa Su-Raj Party	Fernandes Gerald John	368	1.87%	New
MGP	Chodankar Harihar Vithal	241	1.23%	▼11.44
Margin of victory		2,013	10.24%	▼11.19
Turnout		19,657	65.61%	▲4.38
Registered electors		29,912		▲2.17
INC gain from BJP		Swing	▲13.98	

=== Assembly Election 1999 ===
1999 Goa Legislative Assembly election : Aldona
Party	Candidate	Votes	%	±%
BJP	Ulhas Asnodkar	6,587	36.68%	New
INC	Halankar Vishwanath Rohidas	2,738	15.25%	▼30.75
Goa Rajiv Congress Party	D Sa Fatima Joseph Philip	2,542	14.15%	New
MGP	Naik Prabhakar Khushali	2,274	12.66%	New
Independent	Lobo Agnelo Alexinho	2,109	11.74%	New
UGDP	Franco Santan Braz	1,358	7.56%	New
Independent	De'Souza Juino L.	216	1.20%	New
Margin of victory		3,849	21.43%	▲18.60
Turnout		17,959	61.33%	▼8.41
Registered electors		29,278		▲13.13
BJP gain from INC		Swing	▼9.32	

=== Assembly Election 1994 ===
1994 Goa Legislative Assembly election : Aldona
Party	Candidate	Votes	%	±%
INC	Fatima D'Sa	8,303	46.00%	New
BJP	Ulhas Asnodkar	7,792	43.17%	New
Independent	Chopdekar Ratnaker Maddu	1,368	7.58%	New
Independent	Austin Rodrigues	113	0.63%	New
Margin of victory		511	2.83%	▲0.83
Turnout		18,051	68.78%	▼2.89
Registered electors		25,880		▲13.21
INC gain from MGP		Swing	▼3.43	

=== Assembly Election 1989 ===
1989 Goa Legislative Assembly election : Aldona
Party	Candidate	Votes	%	±%
MGP	Ratnakar Chopdekar	8,208	49.43%	New
INC	Dayanand Narvekar	7,875	47.43%	New
Margin of victory		333	2.01%	▼39.05
Turnout		16,605	70.65%	▲12.82
Registered electors		22,860		▲48.51
MGP gain from UGP		Swing		

=== Assembly Election 1972 ===
1972 Goa, Daman and Diu Legislative Assembly election : Aldona
Party	Candidate	Votes	%	±%
UGP	José Silveiro Sousa	5,733	62.26%	▲5.79
Independent	Silver Anacleto Mariand	1,953	21.21%	New
Independent	Mendes Isidoro Jose	1,264	13.73%	New
Margin of victory		3,780	41.05%	▲21.42
Turnout		9,208	58.14%	▼15.40
Registered electors		15,393		▲7.46
UGP hold		Swing		

=== Assembly Election 1967 ===
1967 Goa, Daman and Diu Legislative Assembly election : Aldona
Party	Candidate	Votes	%	±%
UGP	Lobo Sequeira Orlando	6,084	56.47%	New
MGP	M. N. Pandharinath	3,969	36.84%	New
Independent	L. D. C. Nicolav	177	1.64%	New
Independent	C. J. Joao	168	1.56%	New
Independent	A. M. Dsilva	94	0.87%	New
Margin of victory		2,115	19.63%	
Turnout		10,774	73.49%	
Registered electors		14,324		
UGP win (new seat)				

== See also ==
- List of constituencies of the Goa Legislative Assembly
- North Goa district
