= Jaisingrao =

Jaisingrao is a given name. Notable people with the name include:

- Jaisingrao Gaikwad Patil (born 1949), Indian politician
- Jaisingrao Rane, Indian politician
