= Carlos Álvares Ferreira =

Indian politician and advocate (born 1966)

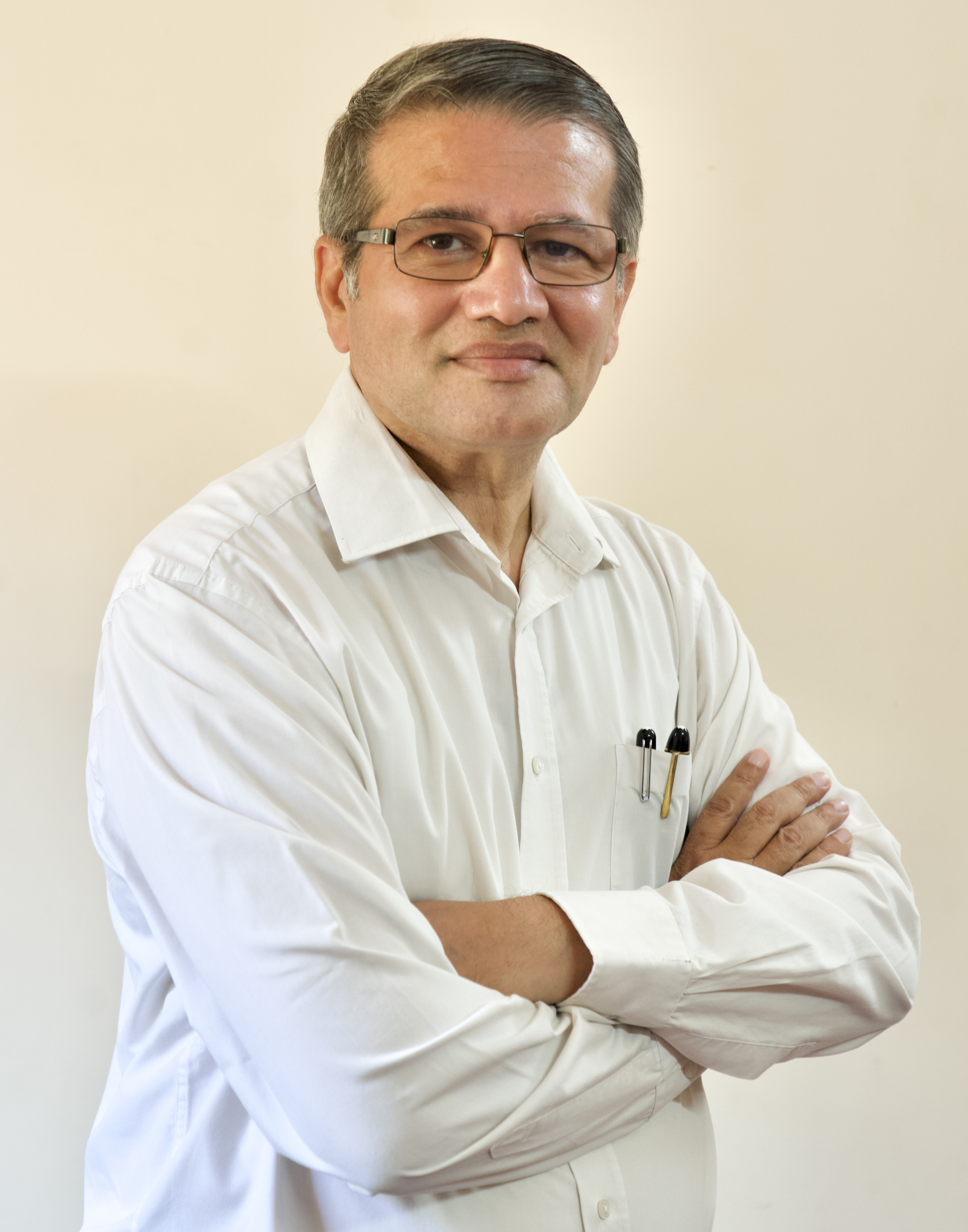
- Ferreira in 2022

Member of Goa Legislative Assembly
- Incumbent
- Assumed office 10 March 2022
- Preceded by: Glenn Ticlo
- Constituency: Aldona

Personal details
- Born: Carlos Álvares Ferreira; 25 June 1966 (age 60) Margao, Goa, India
- Party: Indian National Congress (since 2022)
- Spouse: Natasha Ferreira (m. 1995)
- Children: 2
- Education: Bombay University (B.A.); Goa University (LL.B)
- Occupation: Politician; advocate
- Website: facebook.com/carlosalvaresferreira

Carlos Álvares Ferreira (born 25 June 1966) is an Indian senior advocate and politician who has served as a member of the Goa Legislative Assembly, representing the Aldona Assembly constituency since 2022. He is a former Assistant Solicitor General of India, Public prosecutor and Advocate General of Goa. Ferreira contested on Indian National Congress ticket in the 2022 Goa Legislative Assembly election and emerged victorious. He defeated two-term Bharatiya Janata Party MLA Glenn Ticlo by a margin of 1,823 votes.

Ferreira is a senior lawyer who practices in the Bombay High Court in Goa and The Supreme Court of India. He has been one of the youngest serving Advocates General in Indian history. Ferreira has also held the positions of the State Public Prosecutor in the Bombay High Court in Goa and has also served as the Assistant Solicitor General of India under the Indian National Congress headed by the then India Prime minister Manmohan Singh from 2004 to 2014.

== Personal life ==
Carlos Álvares Ferreira was born on 25 June 1966 in Margao, Goa, India, to Charles Ferreira Alvares a banker who later chose to become a lawyer and a homeopathic doctor. Ferreira is married to Natasha Da Costa, a social worker by profession in January 1995. In June 1996, the couple welcomed their first child, Armando followed by their second child, Daniel in 1997. Ferreira and his family currently reside at Aldona, Goa.

== Career ==
=== Lawyer (1987–present) ===
Ferreira began his career as a lawyer in 1987 after graduating from Govind Ramnath Kare College of Law in Margao. He started working under his father's firm first before starting his own practice in Panjim. He was also the youngest Advocate General in Goa being appointed by Luizinho Faleiro, the then Goa Chief minister. He also served as the Legal Advisor to the then Governor of Goa and Maharastra, S.C. Jamir.

Ferreira was also the Public Prosecutor for Goa under the then Goa Chief minister, Digambar Kamat led government for the Indian National Congress. He currently is the AICC chairperson for the Legal Cell for the State of Goa.
