= Ramponkar movement =

Socio-ecological movement in Goa, India

- Goals: Prevention of unrestricted mechanized fishing; Promotion of local rampon fishing and fishermen by the Government of Goa; Prevent ecological damage due to overfishing
- Methods: Large public processions consisting of 2,000–3,000 participants; Hunger strikes

Parties
Government of Goa	Goenchea Ramponkarancho Ekvott

Lead figures
	Matanhy Saldanha

The Ramponkar movement was a socio-ecological and economic campaign organized by traditional fishermen in Goa. The agitation was led by the Goenchea Ramponkarancho Ekvott (GRE) (transl. Beach-Net Fishermen's Union). It initially began as an economic dispute regarding the livelihoods of local communities and then became an ecological movement addressing marine sustainability. The core conflict centered on a confrontation between traditional coastal fishermen (known as ramponkars) and the owners of mechanized fishing trawlers over the access, management, and preservation of marine resources.

== Background ==
=== Fishing delimitation ===
Goa has an offshore fishing area of 2,500 km that is almost 200 fathoms deep.

=== Rampons and ramponkars ===
Fishing in Goa is traditionally restricted to members of the kharvi community. Ramponkars are a subgroup of kharvis in Goa. When these small-scale, artisanal fishermen come together in groups of 20-25 male members, they are called a band. The bands were named like Chadenkar, Kodibai, Dumgale, Chadiyale, Pequeno Barao and Marale. Each band had a big shed on the seashore called a 'khomp', where the fishing equipment like the nets and boats were stored during the off-season. The fishing license was obtained in the name of the band. These fishermen, or ramponkars, fished in shallow waters within a distance of 2 km of the shore. They were named so because of the traditional fishing net, the rampon, used by them. A rampon is a large fishing net made by sewing together multiple fishing nets. Traditionally, the rampon was made of cotton thread and the ramponkars used wooden boats, which would float even when during mishaps. With the advent of modernisation, the rampon is now made of nylon thread and the boats of fibre. The net is placed in a U-shape and then pulled by the ramponkars while on the boats.

=== Portuguese era ===
In 1897, the government of Portuguese India passed a law that prohibited purse seining or trawling within five fathoms from the shore. This was supposedly done to prevent enemies who might have infiltrated while on small fishing boats.

=== Post-freedom ===
During 1964–65, administrators encouraged ramponkars to invest in trawlers under government schemes, so as to venture further into the ocean with lesser effort. However, the ramponkars were not impressed by the government schemes because they were happy with the amount of fish caught. Further, since they were illiterate, they were unable to understand the benefits suggested by the government. It was then that non-kharvis took the benefit of these schemes and began investing in fishing trawlers between 1975 and 1980.

== Origins ==
During the mid-1970s, traditional Goan fishermen began facing operational disruptions from mechanized trawlers, which frequently damaged their local fishing gear. Simultaneously, the traditional fishhermen observed a notable decline in their overall fish catches. Further, the trawlers ventured in shallow waters even during the breeding season. They also dumped their trash fish on the shores since it did not have market value. All of these factors contributed to intense biological degeneration.

Further, due to an ongoing public protest against Zuari Agro Chemicals, a group of aggrieved traditional fishermen approached Matanhy Saldanha for his support. All these events led to a broader, organized mobilization, resulting in the formal establishment of the GRE in late 1977 to legally and politically represent the interests of the traditional fishing community. By 1978, representatives of the movement warned that if overfishing by mechanized vessels persisted unchecked, Goa's marine industry risked an ecological collapse similar to historical fishery depletions seen in the Peruvian, Atlantic, and North Sea regions.

== Core arguments ==
The GRE stated that traditional rampon fishing techniques operated in balance with the marine environment without overexploiting fish populations, whereas mechanized trawling severely damaged the delicate coastal ecosystem and depleted natural fish stocks. The movement also argued that in a labour-surplus economy like India, traditional labour-intensive fishing methods made greater economic sense than capital-intensive mechanized operations. Further, the GRE maintained that rampon fishing offered sustainable, increasing yields over the long term, noting that mechanized catches had already peaked and caused wild fluctuations in total fish landings despite significant financial investments and advanced technology.

== Methods of protest ==
Because the public in Goa was relatively unfamiliar with large-scale agitations at the time, the GRE organized large public processions consisting of 2,000 to 3,000 participants on numerous occasions. Additionally, they conducted two extended relay hunger strikes, the first from 1980 to 1981 and the second from 1985 to 1986.

== Political impact ==
The movement progressively grew into an influential political bloc. Prior to the 1980 elections, the ramponkars pledged their political support to any party that would guarantee the enactment of a law to regulate mechanized fishing. The Congress (Urs) agreed to this condition in their election manifesto, securing the backing of the movement and subsequently winning power in the 1980 elections.

== Legislative and legal developments ==
A regulatory bill was eventually introduced in 1981, though the movement argued it was heavily compromised due to pressure from mechanized fishing lobbies. The final version of the bill contained several major alterations from a draft circulated by the Central Government and recommendations made by the Majumdar Committee:

- The proposed 20-kilometer near-shore restriction zone for trawlers was reduced to 5 kilometers.
- A clause banning nighttime trawling operations was entirely removed.
- Regulations governing the mesh sizes of fishing nets were omitted.
- The authority to conduct summary trials was shifted from the executive branch to the judiciary, which the movement argued resulted in protracted delays due to pre-existing judicial backlogs.

Trawler owners subsequently challenged this modified bill by filing a writ petition in the Supreme Court. The court issued a temporary ruling that prohibited mechanized fishing within 2 kilometers of the coastline.

== Internal divisions and later phases ==
In later years, the movement entered a quieter phase. Observers noted that the campaign encountered internal class contradictions within the ramponkar community. The community was not entirely uniform; while some members owned their traditional boats, a significant number worked on a wage-earning or catch-sharing basis, leading to disagreements between them. Furthermore, a section of the traditional fishermen aspired to obtain financial loans to transition into the mechanized trawler-owner class themselves.

The movement also faced ongoing challenges from state indifference and illegal monsoon-season fishing by trawlers, which flouted environmental regulations. In 1985, these tensions escalated into armed clashes between traditional fishermen and trawler owners. The local government faced criticism from environmentalists for failing to proactively enforce maritime laws, with state police primarily intervening only when general law and order was directly threatened. Despite its structural weaknesses, contemporary ecologists have viewed the tenets of the movement as a vital framework for preventing localized marine environmental degradation.

== Support for other causes ==
Notably, the GRE expressed their support for the 2011 Indian anti-corruption movement.
