= Cortalim Assembly constituency =

Legislative Assembly constituency in Goa State, India

Coordinates: 15.4°N 73.91°E

Cortalim
- Constituency No. 27 for the Goa Legislative Assembly

Constituency details
- Country: India
- Region: Western India
- State: Goa
- District: South Goa
- Lok Sabha constituency: South Goa
- Established: 1963
- Total electors: 30,782
- Reservation: None

Member of Legislative Assembly
- 8th Goa Legislative Assembly
- Incumbent Antonio Vas
- Party: Independent

Cortalim Assembly constituency is one of the 40 Goa Legislative Assembly constituencies in Goa, India. Cortalim is also one of the 20 constituencies falling under South Goa Lok Sabha constituency.

== Members of Legislative Assembly ==
| Year | Member | Party |
|---|---|---|
| 1963 | Luis Proto Barbosa | United Goans Party |
| 1967 | Luis Proto Barbosa | United Goans Party |
| 1972 | Luis Proto Barbosa | United Goans Party |
| 1977 | Froilano Machado | Indian National Congress |
| 1980 | Froilano Machado | Indian National Congress |
| 1984 | Luis Proto Barbosa | Indian National Congress |
| 1989 | Mauvin Godinho | Indian National Congress |
| 1994 | Mauvin Godinho | Indian National Congress |
| 1999 | Mauvin Godinho | Indian National Congress |
| 2002 | José Matanhy de Saldanha | United Goans Democratic Party |
| 2007 | Mauvin Godinho | Indian National Congress |
| 2012 | José Matanhy de Saldanha | Bharatiya Janata Party |
| 2012 (Note: by-election) | Alina Saldanha | Bharatiya Janata Party |
| 2017 | Alina Saldanha | Bharatiya Janata Party |
| 2022 | Antonio Vas | Independent |

== Election results ==
=== 2027 Assembly election ===
2027 Goa Legislative Assembly election: Cortalim
| Party | Candidate | Votes | % | ±% |
|---|---|---|---|---|
| INC | | | | |
| NDA | | | | |
| NOTA | None of the above | | | |
| Majority | | | | |
| Turnout | | | | |
| gain from | | Swing | | |

=== Assembly Election 2022 ===
2022 Goa Legislative Assembly election : Cortalim
| Party | Candidate | Votes | % | ±% |
|---|---|---|---|---|
| Independent | Antonio Vas | 5,522 | 23.08% | New |
| INC | Olencio Simoes | 4,344 | 18.15% | ▼0.27 |
| Independent | Girish Pillai | 4,251 | 17.76% | New |
| AITC | Gilbert Mariano Rodrigues | 3,246 | 13.56% | New |
| RGP | Teotonio Inacio Santana Costa | 2,480 | 10.36% | New |
| BJP | Narayan Naik | 2,392 | 10.00% | ▼14.13 |
| AAP | Alina Saldanha | 1,355 | 5.66% | ▼4.91 |
| NOTA | None of the Above | 213 | 0.89% | ▼0.00 |
| Margin of victory | | 1,178 | 4.92% | ▲2.72 |
| Turnout | | 23,930 | 77.03% | ▲0.64 |
| Registered electors | | 30,782 | | ▲1.05 |
| Independent gain from BJP | | Swing | ▼1.05 | |

=== Assembly Election 2017 ===
2017 Goa Legislative Assembly election : Cortalim
| Party | Candidate | Votes | % | ±% |
|---|---|---|---|---|
| BJP | Alina Saldanha | 5,666 | 24.13% | New |
| Independent | Antonio Vas | 5,148 | 21.92% | New |
| INC | Gilbert Mariano Rodrigues | 4,326 | 18.42% | New |
| Goa Vikas Party | Nelly Rodrigues | 3,380 | 14.39% | New |
| AAP | Olencio Simoes | 2,482 | 10.57% | New |
| UGP | Ramakant Borkar | 1,708 | 7.27% | New |
| Goa Su-Raj Party | Sharan Meti | 258 | 1.10% | New |
| NOTA | None of the Above | 210 | 0.89% | New |
| Margin of victory | | 518 | 2.21% | |
| Turnout | | 23,486 | 77.10% | |
| Registered electors | | 30,463 | | |
| BJP hold | | Swing | | |

=== Assembly By-election 2012 ===
2012 Goa Legislative Assembly by-election : Cortalim
| Party | Candidate | Votes | % | ±% |
|---|---|---|---|---|
| BJP | Alina Saldanha | Unopposed | | |
| Registered electors | | | | |
| BJP hold | | Swing | | |

=== Assembly Election 2012 ===
2012 Goa Legislative Assembly election : Cortalim
| Party | Candidate | Votes | % | ±% |
|---|---|---|---|---|
| BJP | Matanhy Saldanha | 7,427 | 35.35% | New |
| Goa Vikas Party | Nelly Rodrigues | 5,158 | 24.55% | New |
| UGDP | Ramakant Borkar | 3,716 | 17.69% | ▼17.67 |
| INC | Caitan Xavier | 3,393 | 16.15% | ▼26.78 |
| AITC | Tolentino D'Souza | 728 | 3.47% | New |
| Margin of victory | | 2,269 | 10.80% | ▲3.23 |
| Turnout | | 21,007 | 76.62% | ▲15.29 |
| Registered electors | | 26,652 | | ▼23.74 |
| BJP gain from INC | | Swing | ▼7.58 | |

=== Assembly Election 2007 ===
2007 Goa Legislative Assembly election : Cortalim
| Party | Candidate | Votes | % | ±% |
|---|---|---|---|---|
| INC | Mauvin Godinho | 9,532 | 42.93% | ▲9.79 |
| UGDP | Mathany Saldanha | 7,850 | 35.36% | ▼2.57 |
| Save Goa Front | Raymond Desa | 4,452 | 20.05% | New |
| JD(S) | Mallamma Bidari | 342 | 1.54% | New |
| Margin of victory | | 1,682 | 7.58% | ▲2.79 |
| Turnout | | 22,203 | 63.46% | ▼1.09 |
| Registered electors | | 34,947 | | ▲27.05 |
| INC gain from UGDP | | Swing | ▲5.00 | |

=== Assembly Election 2002 ===
2002 Goa Legislative Assembly election : Cortalim
| Party | Candidate | Votes | % | ±% |
|---|---|---|---|---|
| UGDP | Matanhy Saldanha | 6,741 | 37.93% | New |
| INC | Godinho Mauvin Heliodoro | 5,891 | 33.14% | ▼7.91 |
| BJP | Vaz Anthony Mathew | 4,726 | 26.59% | New |
| Independent | Vaz Joaquim | 212 | 1.19% | New |
| Goa Su-Raj Party | Naik Suresh Kashinath | 122 | 0.69% | New |
| Margin of victory | | 850 | 4.78% | ▼1.47 |
| Turnout | | 17,774 | 64.61% | ▲2.21 |
| Registered electors | | 27,506 | | ▼2.53 |
| UGDP gain from INC | | Swing | ▼3.13 | |

=== Assembly Election 1999 ===
1999 Goa Legislative Assembly election : Cortalim
| Party | Candidate | Votes | % | ±% |
|---|---|---|---|---|
| INC | Mauvin Godinho | 7,230 | 41.06% | ▲4.14 |
| UGDP | Dourado Herculano T. | 6,129 | 34.80% | New |
| Gomantak Lok Pox | Saldanha Matanhy | 1,728 | 9.81% | New |
| BJP | Fernandes Anthony Menino | 1,640 | 9.31% | New |
| Goa Rajiv Congress Party | Saldanha Martha Eltan | 882 | 5.01% | New |
| Margin of victory | | 1,101 | 6.25% | ▼11.99 |
| Turnout | | 17,610 | 62.40% | ▼6.12 |
| Registered electors | | 28,219 | | ▲15.29 |
| INC hold | | Swing | ▲4.14 | |

=== Assembly Election 1994 ===
1994 Goa Legislative Assembly election : Cortalim
| Party | Candidate | Votes | % | ±% |
|---|---|---|---|---|
| INC | Mauvin Heliodoro G. M. | 6,191 | 36.91% | ▼2.29 |
| UGDP | Barbosa Luis Proto Alex | 3,132 | 18.68% | New |
| CPI | Cristopher Fonseca | 2,219 | 13.23% | New |
| BJP | Fernandes Anthony Menin F. | 2,126 | 12.68% | New |
| BSP | Fernandes Antonio F. P. | 1,952 | 11.64% | New |
| Independent | Roquezinho Souza | 731 | 4.36% | New |
| SP | Vernekar Vasudeo G. | 113 | 0.67% | New |
| Margin of victory | | 3,059 | 18.24% | ▲12.73 |
| Turnout | | 16,771 | 67.43% | ▼5.31 |
| Registered electors | | 24,476 | | ▲19.01 |
| INC hold | | Swing | ▼2.29 | |

=== Assembly Election 1989 ===
1989 Goa Legislative Assembly election : Cortalim
| Party | Candidate | Votes | % | ±% |
|---|---|---|---|---|
| INC | Godinho Mauvin | 5,953 | 39.21% | ▼1.46 |
| Independent | Valadares Francisco | 5,117 | 33.70% | New |
| Gomantak Lok Pox | Fernandes Antonio Francisco | 3,781 | 24.90% | New |
| Margin of victory | | 836 | 5.51% | ▼8.19 |
| Turnout | | 15,183 | 72.21% | ▲9.03 |
| Registered electors | | 20,566 | | ▲12.49 |
| INC hold | | Swing | | |

=== Assembly Election 1984 ===
1984 Goa, Daman and Diu Legislative Assembly election : Cortalim
| Party | Candidate | Votes | % | ±% |
|---|---|---|---|---|
| INC | Barbosa Luis Proto | 4,818 | 40.67% | New |
| Independent | Fernandes Antonio Francisco Paulo | 3,195 | 26.97% | New |
| Independent | Da Silva Aleixo Manuel Francisco Rodolfo | 2,487 | 20.99% | New |
| MGP | Lobo Leornardo E. Januario | 400 | 3.38% | New |
| Independent | Vernekar Vasudev Gangadhar | 394 | 3.33% | New |
| Independent | Dias Pascoal | 118 | 1.00% | New |
| Independent | Dias Pascoal M. Jose | 89 | 0.75% | New |
| Margin of victory | | 1,623 | 13.70% | ▼15.48 |
| Turnout | | 11,847 | 62.91% | ▼2.59 |
| Registered electors | | 18,283 | | ▲11.69 |
| INC gain from INC(U) | | Swing | ▼16.41 | |

=== Assembly Election 1980 ===
1980 Goa, Daman and Diu Legislative Assembly election : Cortalim
| Party | Candidate | Votes | % | ±% |
|---|---|---|---|---|
| INC(U) | Froilano Nanchado | 6,296 | 57.08% | New |
| MGP | Caetano Barreto | 3,077 | 27.90% | New |
| Independent | Kamath Ramesh Venkatesh | 540 | 4.90% | New |
| JP | Afonso Norman Rondolencio | 331 | 3.00% | New |
| Independent | Fernandes Antonio Inacio Menino | 259 | 2.35% | New |
| Independent | Andrade Jose Roque Minino | 154 | 1.40% | New |
| Margin of victory | | 3,219 | 29.18% | ▲5.23 |
| Turnout | | 11,030 | 65.48% | ▲5.38 |
| Registered electors | | 16,369 | | ▲9.37 |
| INC(U) gain from INC | | Swing | ▲6.92 | |

=== Assembly Election 1977 ===
1977 Goa, Daman and Diu Legislative Assembly election : Cortalim
| Party | Candidate | Votes | % | ±% |
|---|---|---|---|---|
| INC | Froilano Machado | 4,654 | 50.16% | New |
| MGP | Colaco Pedro Anastacio | 2,431 | 26.20% | New |
| JP | Xavier El Sias George Tarasio | 2,048 | 22.07% | New |
| Margin of victory | | 2,223 | 23.96% | ▼41.54 |
| Turnout | | 9,279 | 61.02% | ▲2.99 |
| Registered electors | | 14,966 | | ▼9.80 |
| INC gain from UGP | | Swing | ▼25.74 | |

=== Assembly Election 1972 ===
1972 Goa, Daman and Diu Legislative Assembly election : Cortalim
| Party | Candidate | Votes | % | ±% |
|---|---|---|---|---|
| UGP | Barbosa Luis Paleixo | 7,431 | 75.90% | ▲0.53 |
| INC | Telo Mascarenhas | 1,018 | 10.40% | New |
| Independent | Sa Rebelo Banecio Canuto | 894 | 9.13% | New |
| Independent | Sansguiri Sripada Sonu | 210 | 2.14% | New |
| Margin of victory | | 6,413 | 65.50% | ▲8.08 |
| Turnout | | 9,791 | 57.58% | ▼7.51 |
| Registered electors | | 16,592 | | ▲19.24 |
| UGP hold | | Swing | ▲0.53 | |

=== Assembly Election 1967 ===
1967 Goa, Daman and Diu Legislative Assembly election : Cortalim
| Party | Candidate | Votes | % | ±% |
|---|---|---|---|---|
| UGP | L. P. Barbosa | 6,977 | 75.37% | New |
| Independent | L. C. Carvalho | 1,662 | 17.95% | New |
| Independent | B. S. Rebello | 289 | 3.12% | New |
| Independent | G. B. Joao | 130 | 1.40% | New |
| Margin of victory | | 5,315 | 57.42% | |
| Turnout | | 9,257 | 65.10% | |
| Registered electors | | 13,915 | | |
| UGP win (new seat) | | | | |

== See also ==
- List of constituencies of the Goa Legislative Assembly
- South Goa district
