= Matanhy Saldanha =

Indian politician and social activist (1948–2012)

Member of the Goa Legislative Assembly
- In office 2002–2007
- Preceded by: Mauvin Godinho
- Succeeded by: Mauvin Godinho
- Constituency: Cortalim
- In office 2012–2012
- Preceded by: Mauvin Godinho
- Succeeded by: Alina Saldanha
- Constituency: Cortalim

Personal details
- Born: José Matanhy de Saldanha; 24 October 1948 Carmona, Goa, Portuguese India
- Died: 21 March 2012 (aged 63) Campal, Goa, India
- Resting place: St. Thomas Church cemetery, Cansaulim, Goa, India; 15°20′57.61″N 73°53′44.54″E
- Party: Bhartiya Janta Party (2012–2012)
- Other political affiliations: United Goans Democratic Party (2002–2007)
- Spouse: Alina Saldanha
- Occupation: Teacher; social activist; journalist; politician
- Known for: Ramponkar movement

José Matanhy de Saldanha (Konkani: Juze Matani de Saldanea; 24 October 1948 – 21 March 2012) was an Indian social activist, journalist, school teacher and former two-term member of the Goa Legislative Assembly, representing the Cortalim Assembly constituency. He campaigned for Goan identity, values, and culture. Saldanha also served as a Cabinet Minister in the Government of Goa with portfolios of Tourism as well as Science and Environment.

== Early life and education ==
Matanhy was born on 24 October 1948, to Jacinto de Saldanha and Maria Alacoque Viegas in Carmona, Goa. He studied at various schools, and studied at the S. Tomas School in his native village of Cansaulim. He later pursued higher studies in Christ College, Bangalore, where, aged around 17, he would share the money sent to him by his father with the poor, and teach them ways to be self-sufficient. He also studied in Belgaum.

Matanhy had degrees in Science and Education. He also obtained a master's degree in Arts (Political Science) from the Bombay University (now, University of Mumbai) in 1988.

== Social activism ==
Besides being a teacher at the Don Bosco High School in Panjim from around June 1974/5 to October 2008, Matanhy also took up the causes of the poor and downtrodden.

In the 1970s, Matanhy campaigned for the Ramponnkars, (traditional fisherman of Goa) to prevent trawlers from fishing within 50 metres of the shore. He formed the Goenchea Ramponnkarancho Ekvott (Association of Goa's Traditional Fisherfolk) and helped stop the discharge of effluents from the Zuari Agro Chemicals factory into the Arabian Sea, near Velsao. The pollution was killing fish, the staple food of Goans. His campaign, the Ramponkar movement, was described as Goa's first successful movement against industrial pollution.

In the late 1970s, with Urbano Lobo and others, he campaigned against the destruction, for mining, of the sand dunes on the beaches of Goa. Matanhy was also associated with the Konkani language agitation in Goa. He was himself a member of the Konkani Bhasha Mandal.

In the early 1990s, Matanhy joined the against anti-Nylon 6,6 movement and, in the late 1990s, against the smelting plant, Meta-Strips. Matanhy was also associated with other movements like the Konkan Railway re-alignment issue and the anti-Special Economic Zone agitation. He was the convenor of the anti-SEZ group, called the "Goa's Movement Against Special Economic Zones (GMAS)".

Saldanha was an active participant of the Goa Special Status movement and believed that Special Status to Goa was needed in order to preserve the state's unique culture and identity.

== Political career ==
In the late 1970s, Matanhy established the "Gomantak Lok Poxx" party.

In the 2000, Matanhy was elected to the South Goa Zilla Panchayat. In 2002, he was elected as a member of the legislative assembly from Cortalim constituency as a candidate of the United Goans Democratic Party (UGDP). In 2004, he was inducted in the Cabinet of the Government of Goa headed by then Chief Minister of Goa, Manohar Parrikar. He was given the portfolios of Tourism as well as Sports and Youth Affairs.

In February 2005, then Governor of Goa S. C. Jamir dismissed the Manohar Parrikar-led government after high allegations in the state legislature. The United Goans Democratic Party (which Saldanha represented in the Assembly) withdrew support to the Parrikar government. Parrikar was asked to prove his majority, by the Governor. Though the UGDP withdrew support, Saldanha, who was away in Spain on an official visit at the time of the political developments, contradicted the party's stand and conveyed his support to the Parrikar government. He sent a fax message to the Governor pledging his "unconditional and unqualified support" to the Parrikar government. After Parrikar's dismissal, Pratapsingh Rane of the Indian National Congress was sworn in as the Chief Minister of Goa.

Saldanha was disqualified by then Speaker of the Goa Legislature, Francisco Sardinha, in August 2005 upon a disqualification petition filed against him by Jitendra Deshprabhu, spokesperson of the Indian National Congress. However, the Goa Bench of the Bombay High Court set aside Matanhy's disqualification in 2011.

Matanhy unsuccessfully contested the elections to the 15th Lok Sabha from the South Goa (Lok Sabha constituency) as a candidate of the United Goans Democratic Party (UGDP).

In January 2012, Matanhy quit the United Goans Democratic Party (UGDP) due to UGDP forming an alliance with the Goa Vikas Party. He later joined the Bharatiya Janata Party and contested as a BJP candidate from the Cortalim constituency in the 2012 Goa Legislative Assembly election.

After the BJP gained majority in the 2012 Goa Legislative Assembly election, Manohar Parrikar was sworn in as the Chief Minister of Goa. He inducted Matanhy Saldanha in his Cabinet. Saldanha was allotted the portfolios of Tourism as well as Science and Environment.

After Matanhy died in harness, his widow Alina Saldanha contested by-elections from the Cortalim constituency as a BJP candidate and was elected unopposed to the Goa State Legislature. She was later sworn in as a Cabinet Minister in the Parrikar government. Alina Saldanha holds the portfolios of Museums, Environment and Forests.

== Death and burial ==
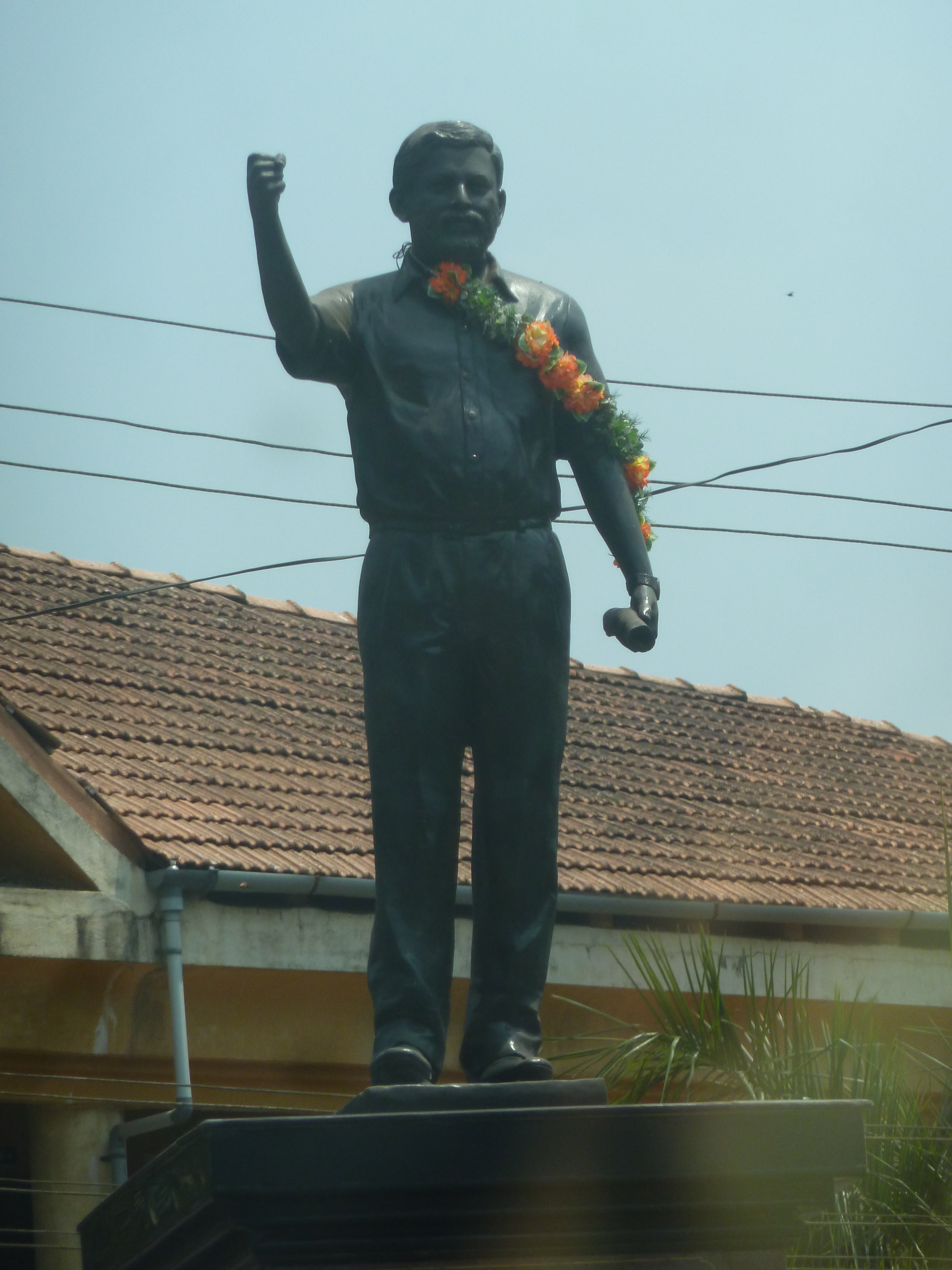
Matanhy Saldanha statue

After attending the xigmo (spring festival) in Canacona the previous night, Matanhy suffered a massive heart attack in the early hours of 21 March 2012, and died at 3 am in Campal, Goa. He was buried at the cemetery of the Catholic Church of Saint Thomas, in his native village of Cansaulim, in the evening of 24 March 2012. His funeral mass was led by the Archbishop Patriarch of Goa e Damão, Filipe Neri Ferrão and around 100 priests. The funeral was attended by around 10,000 people. In her eulogy, his wife Alina Saldanha said he wished to live after death. This was based on his faith in the Catholic Church's teachings.

== Legacy ==
A statue of Matanhy Saldanha was inaugurated by the then Chief Minister of Goa, Manohar Parrikar at Cansaulim on 24 October 2014. The South Goa District Collectorate Building in Fatorda, Margao was named in honour of Matanhy as the "Matanhy Saldanha Administrative Complex".
