= Mangueshi Temple =

Hindu temple in Goa, India

Shree Mangesh Saunsthan
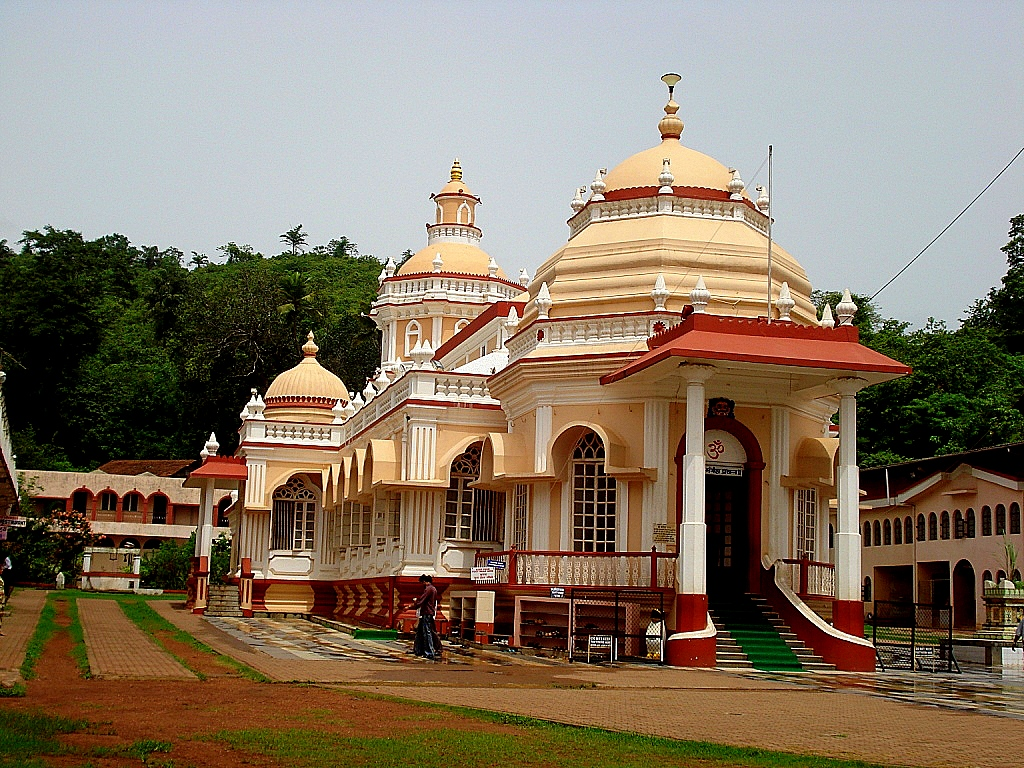

Religion
- Affiliation: Hinduism
- District: South Goa
- Deity: Shiva
- Festival: Maha Shivaratri

Location
- Location: Mangeshi Village, Priol
- State: Goa
- Country: India
- Interactive map of Shree Mangesh Saunsthan

Architecture
- Established: 1560
- Completed: 1560

Website
- shrimangesh.com

Shri Manguesh temple is Hindu temple in India, located at Mangueshi in Priol, Ponda taluk, Goa. It is at a distance of 1 km from Mardol close to Nagueshi, 21 km from Panaji the capital of Goa, and 26 km from Margao. Shree Mangueshi is the Kuldeva (family deity) of Saraswat Brahmins and other gotras. Shrimad Swamiji of Shri Kavale Math is Spiritual chief Of Shri Manguesh Saunsthan, Mangueshi. This temple is one of the largest and most frequently visited temples in Goa.

From 2011, temple prescribed a dress code, to keep the sanctity of the temple premise.

== Legend ==
According to folklore, Lord Shiva left Mount Kailash after losing a game of dice to his wife Goddess Parvati and settled in the jungles of Kushasthali (modern-day Cortalim). When Parvati came searching for him, Shiva transformed into a tiger to frighten her. Terrified, Parvati cried out, Trahi Mam Girisha! ("Save me, O Lord of the Mountains!"). Shiva immediately returned to his original form. The phrase "Mam Girisha" eventually evolved into the name Manguesh.

== History ==
=== Origins ===
According to regional historical traditions, the sage Parashurama brought ten lineages of Brahmins (Dashagotri) comprising 64 distinct clans from Trihotra Pura to settle in Gomantak (Goa). These clans brought the idols of their family deities (Kuladevatas)—which included Mangesh, Shantadurga, Nagesh, Mahalakshmi, Saptakoteshwar, and Mahalasa—and established them across the region. The deity of Mangesh was originally consecrated in Kushasthali (also known as Cortalim), a village in Mormugão.

=== Relocation to Ponda ===
Following the establishment of Portuguese rule in Goa in 1510 CE, a period of religious persecution, forced conversions, and the destruction of Hindu temples began. Upon discovering a Portuguese plot to forcibly convert the inhabitants of Salcete taluka and demolish local temples, the traditional patrons (Kulavis) of the temple secretly uprooted the sacred lingam of Lord Mangesh overnight.

The lingam was transported to the neighbouring territory ruled by the Adil Shahi dynasty, where Hindu chieftains (Sardars) held administrative authority at the time. It was subsequently re-established in Priol, Ponda taluka. Ancient records from the temple date this relocation to the year 1560 CE (Shalivahan Shaka 1482, Raudra Samvatsara). Contemporary reports written by the priests of the Company of Jesus (Jesuits) to their superiors state that this migration took place prior to 1 May 1560. Following the relocation, the abandoned temple building in Kushasthali was utilized by the Jesuit priests as a church, where they installed their own religious deities.

== Structure ==
The original site was a very simple structure, and the current structure was only built under the Maratha Empire, some 150 years after it had been moved. The Peshwas donated the village of Mangeshi to the temple in 1739 on the suggestion of their Sardar, Shri Ramchandra Malhar Sukhtankar, who was a staunch devotee of Shri Mangesh. Just a few years after it was built, this area fell into Portuguese authority in 1763. By then, the Portuguese had lost their initial religious zeal and had been repeatedly defeated by the Marathas and had become quite tolerant of other religions, so this structure remained untouched.

Historical documentation regarding the appearance and design of the initial temple erected in Priol immediately after the relocation is unavailable. A secondary temple structure was later constructed on the site during the golden period of Maratha rule. In 1890 CE, a third temple building was constructed at the same location.

The fourth major renovation (jiroddhara) of the temple complex concluded on the day of Magha Shukla Purnima in Shaka 1894. On this auspicious day, corresponding to 17 February 1973, a golden kalasha (holy vessel) was officially installed atop the roof of the shrine of Lord Mangesh.

== Deities ==
=== Main Deity ===
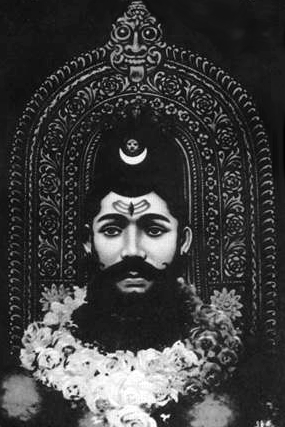
Scan of a wallet card depicting Shiva as Manguesh

The main temple is dedicated to Shiva as Manguesh. The god is worshipped here as a Shiva linga.

He is the Kuladevata of the Goud Saraswat Brahmins of Vatsa and Koundinya Gotras.

=== Other deities ===
The complex also has shrines of other deities in the temple, including Nandi, Ganesha, Parvati and the Gramapurusha Deva Sharma of the Vatsa gotra. The subsidiary shrines to the rear of the main building house Devtas like Mulakeshwar, Virabhadra, Shantadurga, Lakshmi Narayan, Surya, Garuda and Kala Bhairav.

== Legend ==
The Mangesh Linga is said to have been created in the Himalayas on Mount Mangireesh (Mongir) on the banks of the river Bhagirathi by the creator deity Brahma, from where the Saraswat Brahmins brought it to Trihotrapuri in Bihar. They carried the linga to Gomantaka and settled at Mormugao, on the banks of the Zuari river, at Kushasthali (modern day Cortalim) and initially established the temple there, before the Portuguese invasions forced the linga to be moved again to its current location in Manguesh.

== Temple complex ==
The temple architecture consists of several domes, pilasters and balustrades. There is a prominent Nandi idol and a beautiful seven-storeyed deepastambha (lamp tower), which stands inside the temple complex in Saraswat Architectural style. The temple also has a magnificent water tank, which is believed to be the oldest part of the temple.

The Sabha Mandapa is a spacious hall that accommodates over 500 people. The decor includes the chandeliers of the nineteenth century. The central part of the Sabha Mandapa leads to the Garbha Griha (main sanctum), where the Manguesh idol is enshrined.

The temple complex features Agrashalas, which provide lodging and accommodation options for visiting devotees.

== Rituals ==
The traditional family patrons (Kulavis) of the Devasthan belong exclusively to two distinct lineage groups: the Vatsa gotra and the Kaundinya gotra.

=== Daily rituals ===
Like most temples in Goa, Mangueshi Temple has a large number of pujas being performed daily. Every morning, Shodashopachara pujas, namely Abhisheka, Laghurudra and Maharudra, are performed. This is followed by Maha-Aarti at noon and Panchopachara pooja at night.

Every Monday, the procession idol of Manguesh is taken out for a procession in a palanquin (pallaki) accompanied by music before the evening Aarti. This is known as the Shibikotsav.

=== Festivals ===
The annual festivals include Rama Navami, Akshaya Tritiya, Anant Vritotsava, Navaratri, Dussehra, Diwali, Magha Poornima Festival (Jatrotsav) and Maha Shivaratri. Magha Poornima Festival begins on Magha Shukla Saptami and ends on Magha Poornima (full moon night of the Magha month).

== Gallery ==
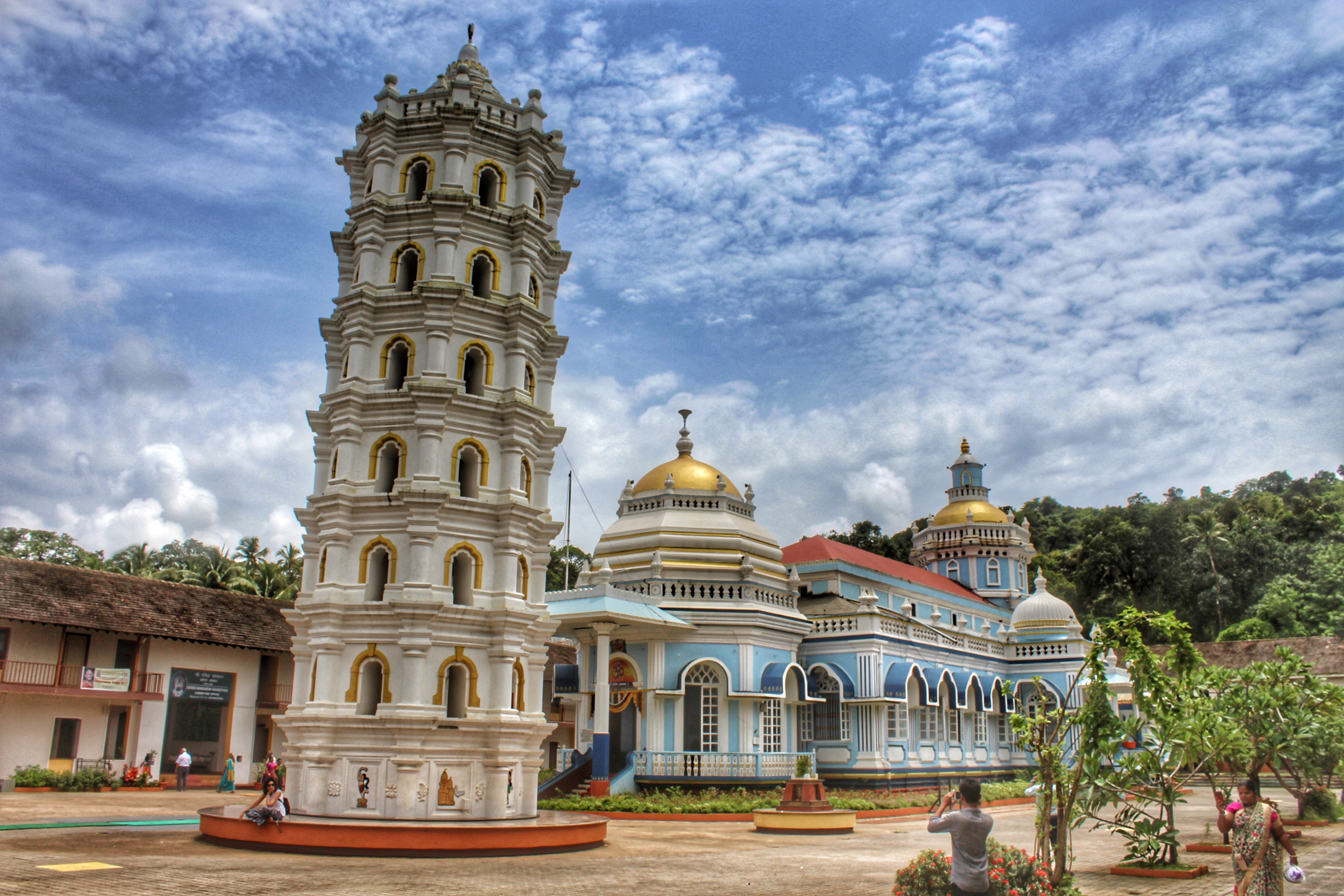
View Of the Temple on a cloudy day

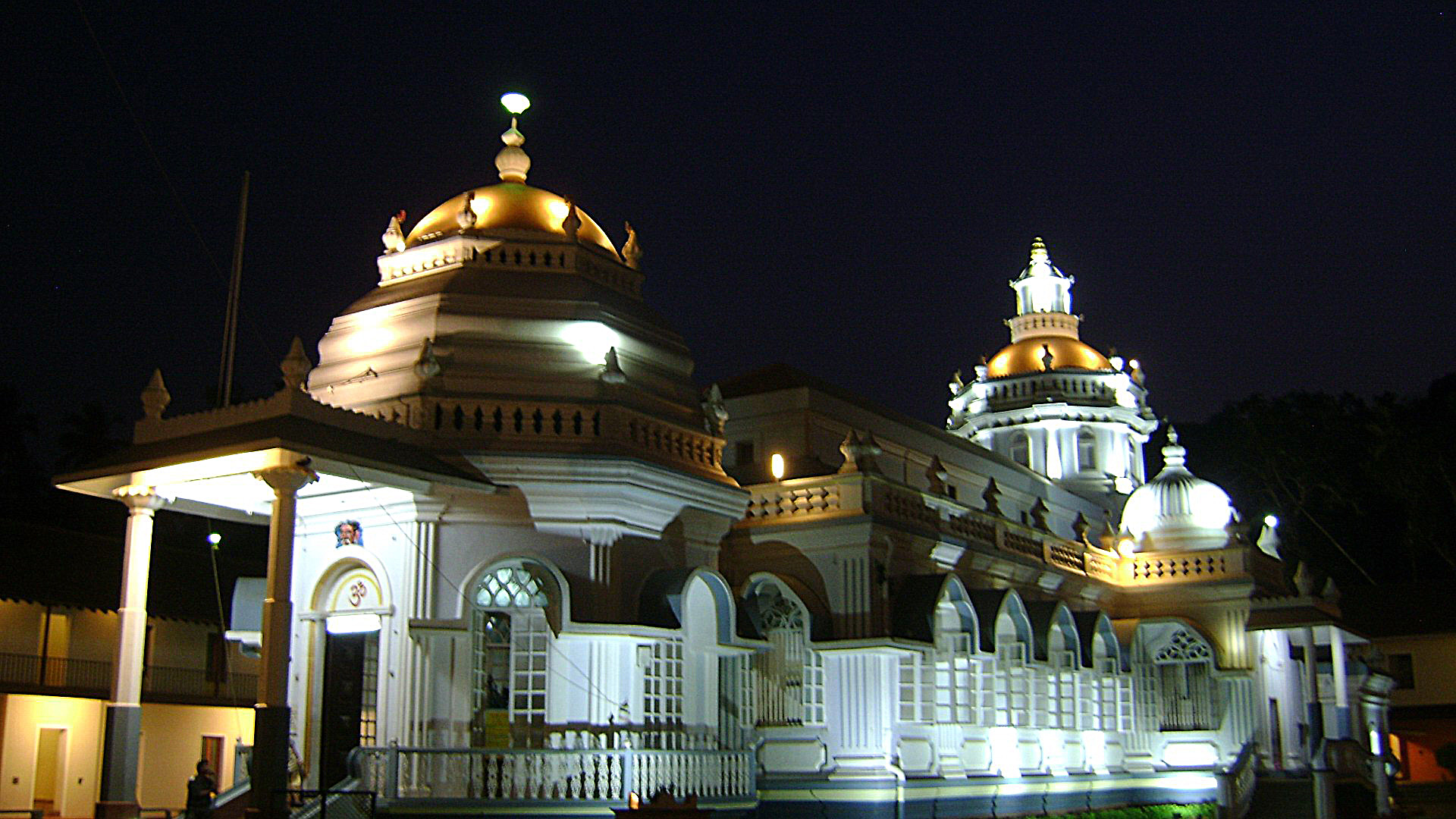
Night View

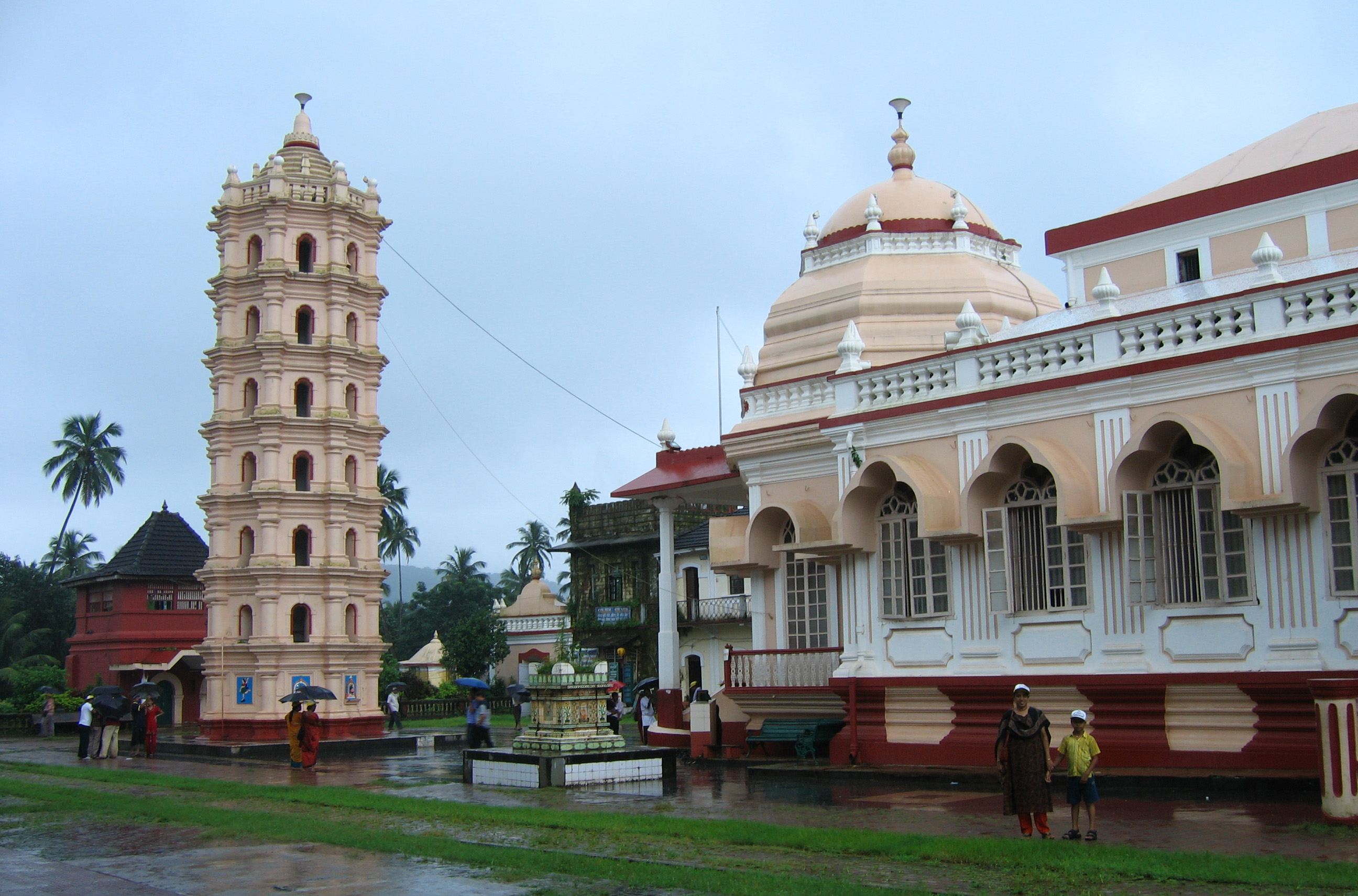
A photo showing the Gopuram, temple and Deep Stambha.

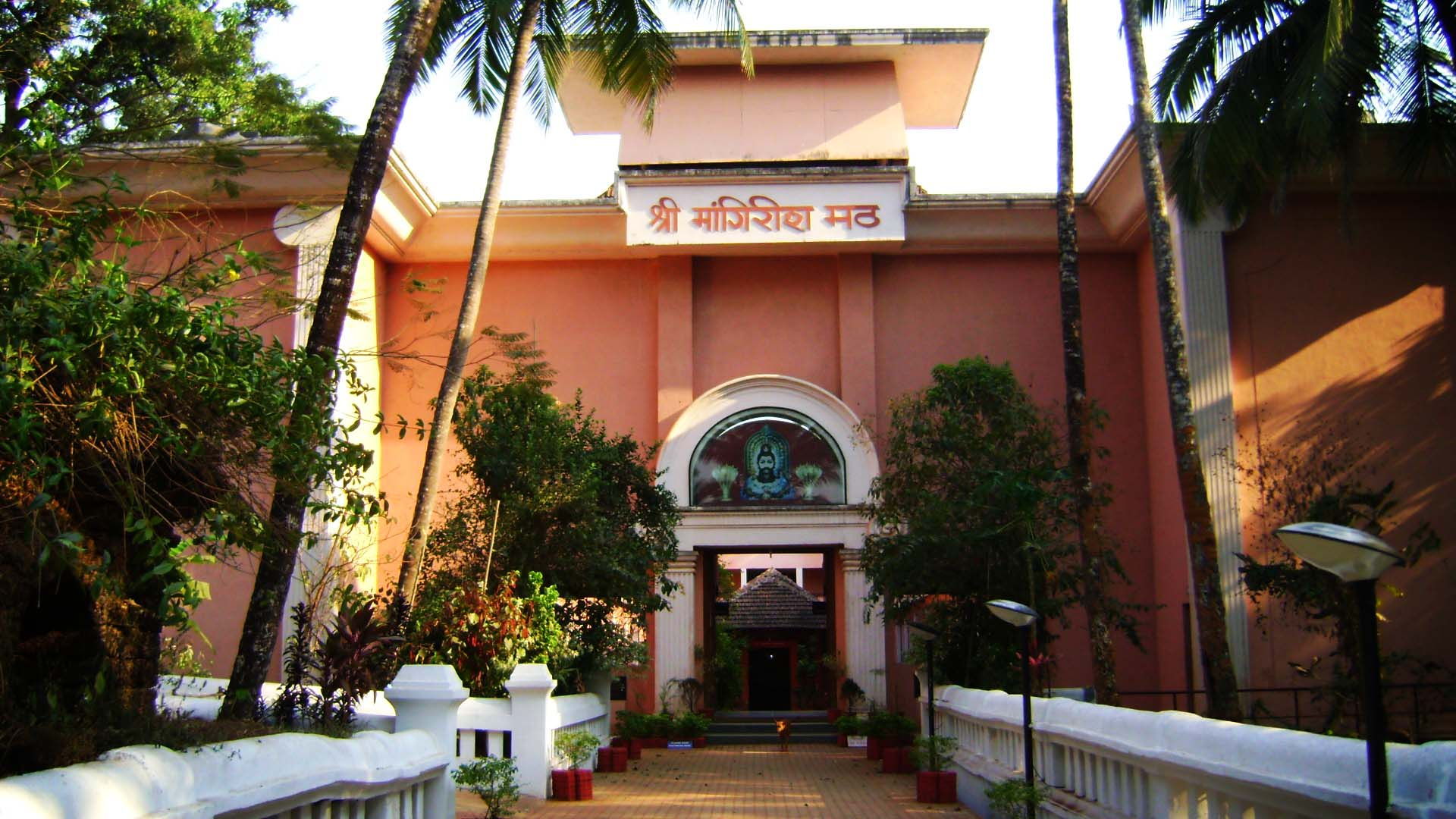
Shri Mangirish Math, located near the entrance path towards the temple

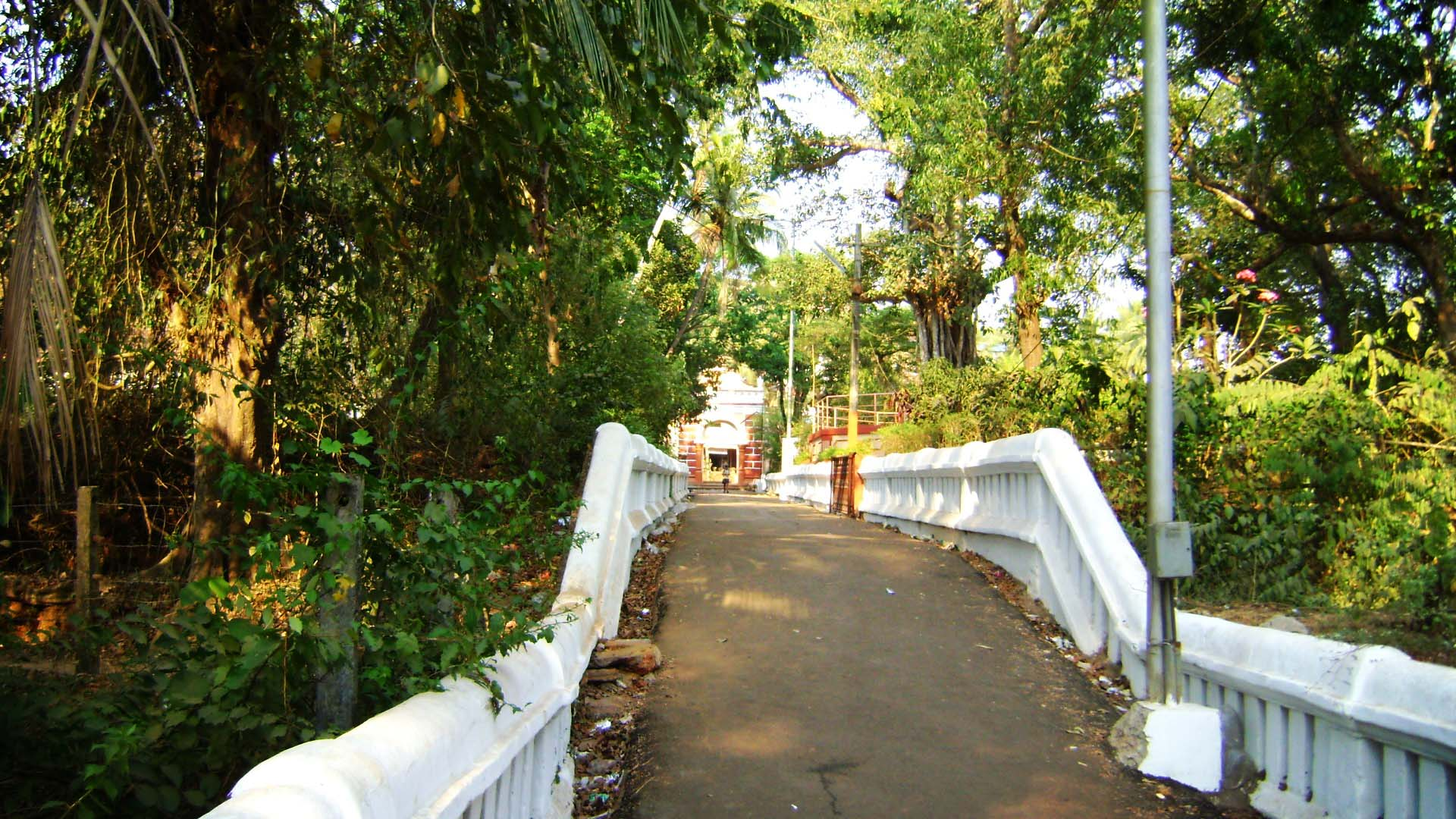
Entrance towards Shri Mangueshi Temple

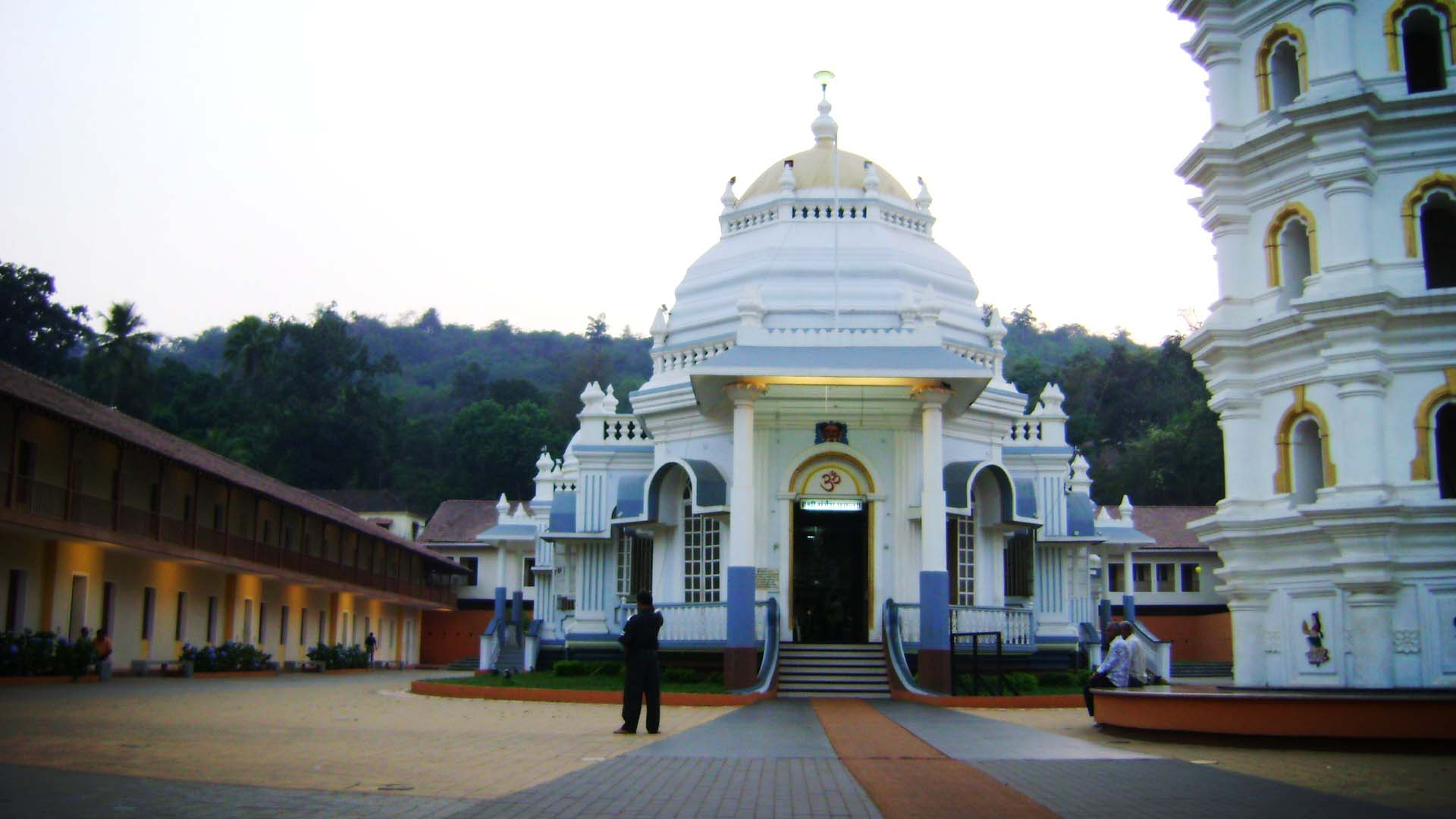
View of the Shri Mangueshi Temple from the front

View of the Shri Mangeshi Temple water tank

Shri Mangeshi Temple Rath (Temple Chariot)

== See also ==
- Mangeshi Village
- Ramnathi
- Shanta Durga temple
- Kavale
- 17th-century Western domes
