= Narayan Fugro =

Indian politician

Narayan Srinivasa Fugro

Speaker of the Goa, Daman & Diu Legislative Assembly
- In office 1972–1980
- Preceded by: Gopal Kamat
- Succeeded by: Froilano Machado

Member of the Goa, Daman & Diu Legislative Assembly
- In office 1967–1980
- Preceded by: Mamdali Jiwani
- Succeeded by: Shamjibhai Bhika Solanki
- Constituency: Diu

Personal details
- Born: 2 March 1932 Marcela, Goa, Portuguese India
- Died: 1 September 2009 (aged 77)

Narayan Srinivasa Fugro (March 2, 1932 – September 1, 2009) was an Indian politician. He served as the Speaker of the Legislative Assembly of Goa, Daman and Diu between February 24, 1972, and January 20, 1980.

He was the son of Shriniwas Krishna and Radhabai. Fugro became a municipal councilor in Diu in 1959. In 1967 he became the president of the Amichand Rupchand Charitable Dispensary Trust in Diu.

He was elected as an independent candidate from the Diu seat in the first Legislative Assembly election in 1967, with 1,552 votes (23.60% of the votes in the constituency). In April 1971, he voted against a motion to include Konkani language in the Eight Scheduled of the Constitution of India. He retained the Diu seat in the 1972 election, obtaining 4,598 votes (58.08%). He again won the Diu seat in the 1977 election, with 5,522 votes (56.41%). His candidature was supported by the Congress (I). In 1979 Fugro withdrew his support to the Shashikala Kakodkar cabinet, leading to its fall and the imposition of President's Rule.

He lost the Diu seat in the 1980 election, finishing in second place with 4,633 votes (43.44%). The election campaign was marred with violence, as followers of Fugro's opponent went on riot in Diu. Two people were killed in the clashes. Fugro again finished in second place in Diu the 1984 election, with 5,727 votes (47.15%). After Daman and Diu were separated from Goa and given Union Territory status of its own, a by-election for a new Lok Sabha constituency was held on November 7, 1987. Fugro finished in second place, trailing behind Gopal Kalan Tandel of the Indian National Congress. Fugro had stood as an independent candidate, obtaining 9,303 votes.

He died at the age of 78, after prolonged illness.
