= Gopal Kalan Tandel =

Indian politician

Member of the Indian Parliament for Daman and Diu

Personal details
- Born: 5 August 1953 (age 73) Daman, Portuguese India
- Relations: Kalan Bijia Tandel (Father)
- Education: South Gujarat University

Gopal Kalan Tandel (born 5 August 1953) is an Indian politician. He was a Member of Parliament in the 8th (elected in 1987) and 1996–1998 in 11th Lok Sabha. He was the first parliamentarian to represent Daman and Diu (Lok Sabha constituency) in the Lok Sabha. He has been part of Indian National Congress, Bharatiya Janata Party, and currently Bharatiya Janata Party.

== Early life and education ==
Gopal Kalan Tandel is the son of Kalan Bijia Tandel. He studied at the South Gujarat University, obtaining a B.Com. degree. He served as the president of the Daman Municipal Council between 1984 and 1986.

== Daman and Diu by-election ==
After Daman and Diu were separated from Goa and given Union Territory status of its own, a by-election for a new Lok Sabha constituency was held on 7 November 1987. Tandel won the seat, defeating the independent candidate Narayan Fugro. Tandel had stood as an Indian National Congress candidate and obtained 17,027 votes. He lost the Daman and Diu seat in the 1989 Lok Sabha election. He stood as an Indian National Congress candidate, finishing second with 13,807 votes (37.79%).

He stood as an independent in the election for the Daman and Diu seat in the 1991 Lok Sabha election. He finished in second place with 9,808 votes (25.85%).

He regained the Daman and Diu seat in the 1996 Lok Sabha election, standing as an Indian National Congress candidate. He obtained 24,543 votes (50.62% of the votes in the constituency). He resigned from the Indian National Congress on 26 December 1997, along with three other parliamentarians. He joined the Bharatiya Janata Party on 20 January 1998, along with B.P. Maurya and Mohanbhai Sanjibhai Delkar. On 15 March 2004 the Central Election Committee of BJP declared Tandel as its candidate in the Daman and Diu seat in the 2004 Lok Sabha election. He finished in second place with 26,916 votes. Tandel contested the 2009 Lok Sabha election as a Nationalist Congress Party candidate. He got 2,144 votes (3.15%) in the Daman and Diu constituency. As of 2011 he was the president of the NCP unit in Daman.
