= Priol =

- Village
- Location in Goa, India Priol (India)
- Coordinates: 15°25′N 73°59′E
- Country: India
- State: Goa
- District: North Goa

Population (2011)
  - Total: 8,164

Languages
  - Official: Konkani
- Time zone: UTC+5:30 (IST)
- Vehicle registration: GA
- Website: goa.gov.in

Priol is a village in Goa, India. It is situated in the Ponda taluka. The Mangueshi Temple is located northwest of the village. From Mardol, Priol is around 2 km, Mardol is on Panaji-Ponda highway. It is 7 km from Ponda or 22 km from Panaji.

The famous Kelekar family is from Priol and their famous ancestral 'KELEKAR HOUSE' is located near Betal Temple. Another Kelekar house is situated at Nagar near village panchayat, which was constructed in the year 1937 by Ravindra Kelekar.

== Government and politics ==
Priol is part of Priol Assembly constituency and North Goa Lok Sabha constituency. Since 2017, its representative in the Goa Legislative Assembly is Govind Gaude.
