= Devjibhai Tandel =

Indian politician

Devjibhai Tandel (born 10 December 1950 in Daman, Daman and Diu) was a member of the 9th Lok Sabha, 10th Lok Sabha and 12th Lok Sabha of India. He represented the Daman and Diu constituency of Dadra and Nagar Haveli and Daman and Diu and was a member of the Bharatiya Janata Party political party.
