= Umeshbhai Patel =

Indian politician

Umeshbhai Babubhaiji Patel
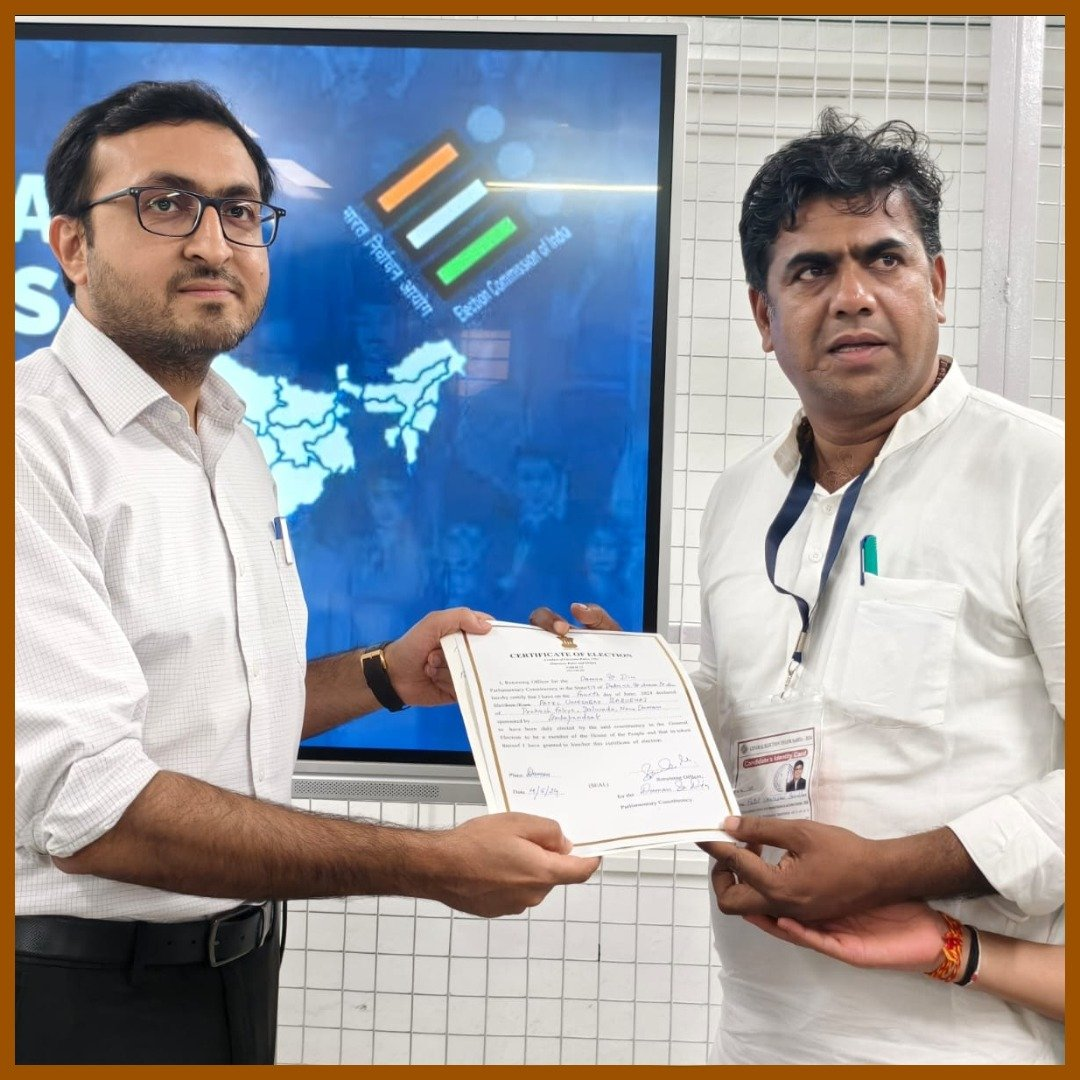
- Umeshbhai Babubhaiji Patel in Right

Member of Parliament from Daman and Diu
- Incumbent
- Assumed office 4 June 2024
- President: Draupadi Murmu
- Prime Minister: Narendra Modi
- Vice President: Jagdeep Dhankhar; C. P. Radhakrishnan
- Preceded by: Lalubhai Patel
- Constituency: Daman and Diu

Personal details
- Born: Umeshbhai Patel; 27 November 1977 (age 48) Daman and Diu, Dadra and Nagar Haveli and Daman and Diu, India
- Citizenship: India
- Party: Independent
- Parent: Babubhaiji Patel (father)
- Occupation: Politician
- Profession: Agriculturist

Umeshbhai Babubhai Patel is an Indian politician. He won the Lok Sabha elections from Daman and Diu in 2024.

== Early life ==
Umeshbhai Patel was born in a farming Koli family of Daman and Diu to Babubhai Patel in 1977.

== Political career ==
Babubhai was elected as a Member of Parliament from Daman and Diu as an independent candidate in 2024 General Elections. He defeated the three-time Bharatiya Janta Party Member of Parliament Lalu Patel by a margin of 6225 votes.
