= Ulhas Asnodkar =

Indian politician

Deputy Speakers of the Goa Legislative Assembly
- In office 1999–2002
- Preceded by: Aleixo Sequeira
- Succeeded by: Narahari Haldankar
- Constituency: Sanvordem

Personal details
- Born: Ulhas Asnodkar; 22 May 1955 (age 70) Porvorim, Goa
- Party: Bharatiya Janata Party
- Spouse: Poonam Asnodkar
- Parent: Gopal Asnodkar (father)
- Education: 10th Pass
- Profession: Business

Ulhas Asnodkar is an Indian politician. He was elected to the Goa Legislative Assembly from Aldona in the 1999 Goa Legislative Assembly election as a member of the Bharatiya Janata Party. He was Deputy Speaker of the Goa Legislative Assembly from December 1999 to February 2002.
