= Lalubhai Patel =

Indian politician

Member of Parliament, Lok Sabha
- In office 16 May 2009 – 4 June 2024
- Preceded by: Patel Dahyabhai Vallabhbhai
- Succeeded by: Patel Umeshbhai Babubhai
- Constituency: Daman and Diu

Member of Committee on Home Affairs
- In office 31 August 2009 – April 2014
- Prime Minister: Manmohan Singh

Member of Standing Committee on Home Affairs
- In office 1 September 2014 – 2024
- Prime Minister: Narendra Modi

Personal details
- Born: 31 August 1955 (age 70) Daman, Daman and Diu
- Party: Bharatiya Janata Party
- Profession: Politician

Lalubhai Babubhaiji Patel is an Indian politician and former Member of Parliament from Daman and Diu Lok Sabha constituency as a member of the Bharatiya Janata Party.

== Early life ==
Lalubhai Patel was born into a farming Koli family.

== Offices ==
- 2009 - 2014: Member of Parliament from Daman and Diu Lok Sabha constituency
- 2014 - 2019: 2nd term Member of Parliament from Daman and Diu Lok Sabha constituency
- 2019 - 2024: 3rd term Member of Parliament from Daman and Diu Lok Sabha constituency
