= Cortalim =

- village
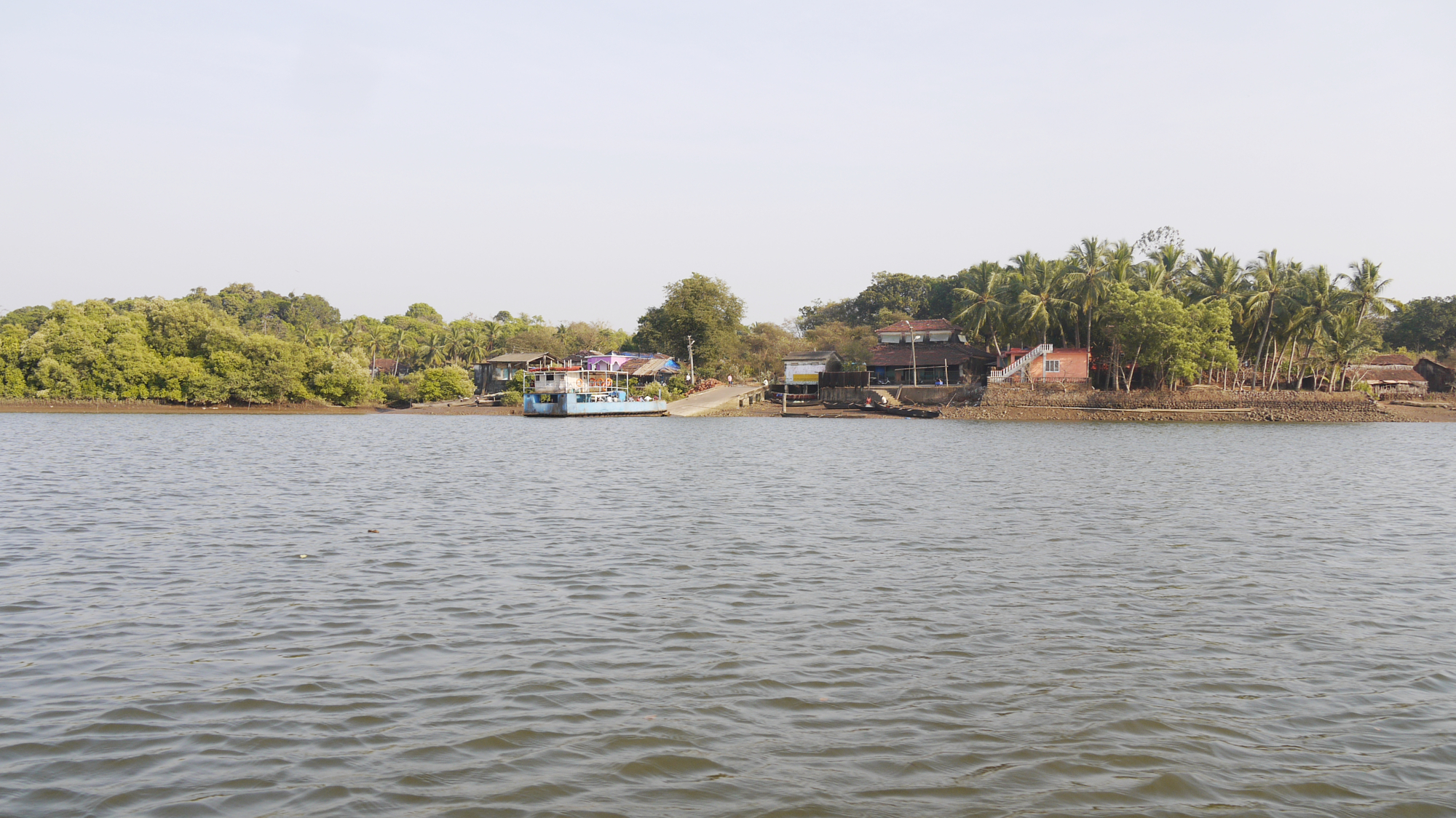
- River Zuari near Cortalim

- Location of Cortalim in Goa Cortalim (India)
- Coordinates: 15°23′52″N 73°54′38″E
- Country: India
- State: Goa
- District: South Goa
- Sub-district: Mormugao

Area
  - Total: 8 km^{2} (3.1 sq mi)

Population
  - Total: 15,000
  - Density: 1,900/km^{2} (4,900/sq mi)
- Time zone: UTC+5:30 (IST)
- Postcode: 403710
- Area code: 0832
- Vehicle registration: GA 06

Cortalim (pronounced [kuʈʈʰaːɭĩː]) is a village in Morumugão, Goa, India. Its native Goan population is entirely Catholic and their main occupations include fishing and agriculture. Located on the banks of the Zuari River, it was previously known as Kushasthale.

The village is well known as the former site of an ancient temple dedicated to Shiva. There is also a cross commemorating the arrival of Christianity, together with St Philip and James Church. A new road bridge is being constructed at Cortalim as part of the elevated road scheme that connects South and North Goa.

== Location ==
Cortalim is located roughly midway on the main route connecting Panjim to Margao and Vasco (National Highway 17). It is located 16 kilometres to the south of Panjim, 17 kilometres to the north of Margao and 8 kilometres from Mormugao.

== History ==
The current local name for the village, Kutthalle, is derived from the previous name Kushasthale (place where holy grass is grown for ritual sacrifice), also attributed to Krishna's birthplace, Dwarka. During the Portuguese era, the village was a part of the taluka of Salcete. In 1543, it became the first Goan village where Christianity was officially introduced. On 1 May 1560, the first Holy Mass was conducted here by Fr Pedro Mascarenhas, a Jesuit priest.

Before the Portuguese conquest of Goa, Cortalim village was also the site of the Mangueshi temple, dedicated to a form of Shiva. During the demolition of temples across Salcete ordered by the Viceroy António de Noronha, a local Brahmin gotra emigrated with the idol to its current location in Priol, Ponda.

Novo Palmar, Thana, Nauta, Consua, 1st Arvalle, 2nd Arvalle, Zomboll, Chovoth, Vollant, Igorje Vaddo, Bondir, Maddant, Panzentar, Chaudi, Sotrant, Gallio, Almabhat, Dumiabhatt and Virabhat are the various wadde (wards) of the village.

== Demographics ==
According to the 2011 Census, Cortalim has a population of 9080 people, with 25% belonging to the Scheduled tribes.

== Government and politics ==
Cortalim is part of Cortalim (Goa Assembly constituency) and South Goa (Lok Sabha constituency).

== Historical Attractions ==
- Foodgrain godowns: During Portuguese rule, these godowns on the banks of the Zuari river were used by the Portuguese Board of External Trade (Commercio Junta Externo) to store foodgrains.
- St Philip and St James Church: Built in 1566, it is one of Goa's oldest churches.
- Chapel of Sacred Heart of Jesus: Situated in Manxer, it hosted Salcete's first Mass in 1560.
- Colaços' ancestral house: This 180-year-old building now lies in ruins.
- Kolvontachem Tollem: Literally translating to "lake of the temple dancers", this lake was the bathing site for the dancers of the original Mangueshi temple and is now in ruins.
