= Froilano Machado =

Indian politician and lawyer (1925–2008)

- Official portrait in 1977

Speaker of Goa, Daman and Diu Legislative Assembly
- In office 21 January 1980 – 22 March 1984
- Preceded by: Narayan Fugro
- Succeeded by: Dayanand Narvekar

Member of Goa, Daman and Diu Legislative Assembly
- In office 1977–1984
- Preceded by: Luis Proto Barbosa
- Succeeded by: Luis Proto Barbosa
- Constituency: Cortalim

Personal details
- Born: Froilano Carmelino da Rocha Machado; 22 November 1925 Vasco da Gama, Goa, Portuguese India
- Died: 24 April 2008 (aged 82) Goa, India
- Party: Indian National Congress (U) (1980–1984)
- Spouse: Sara (Sarita) Souza
- Children: 5
- Education: St. Xavier's College, Mumbai (B.A.); Bombay University
- Profession: Advocate; social worker

Froilano Carmelino da Rocha Machado (22 November 1925 – 24 April 2008) was an Indian politician, advocate, independence activist, businessman, writer, poet and social worker who served as a member of the Goa, Daman and Diu Legislative Assembly, representing the Cortalim Assembly constituency from 1977 to 1984. He served as the speaker of the Goa, Daman and Diu Legislative Assembly from 1980 to 1984. He was noted for his contributions in the Goan independence movement and Konkani language.

== Early life ==
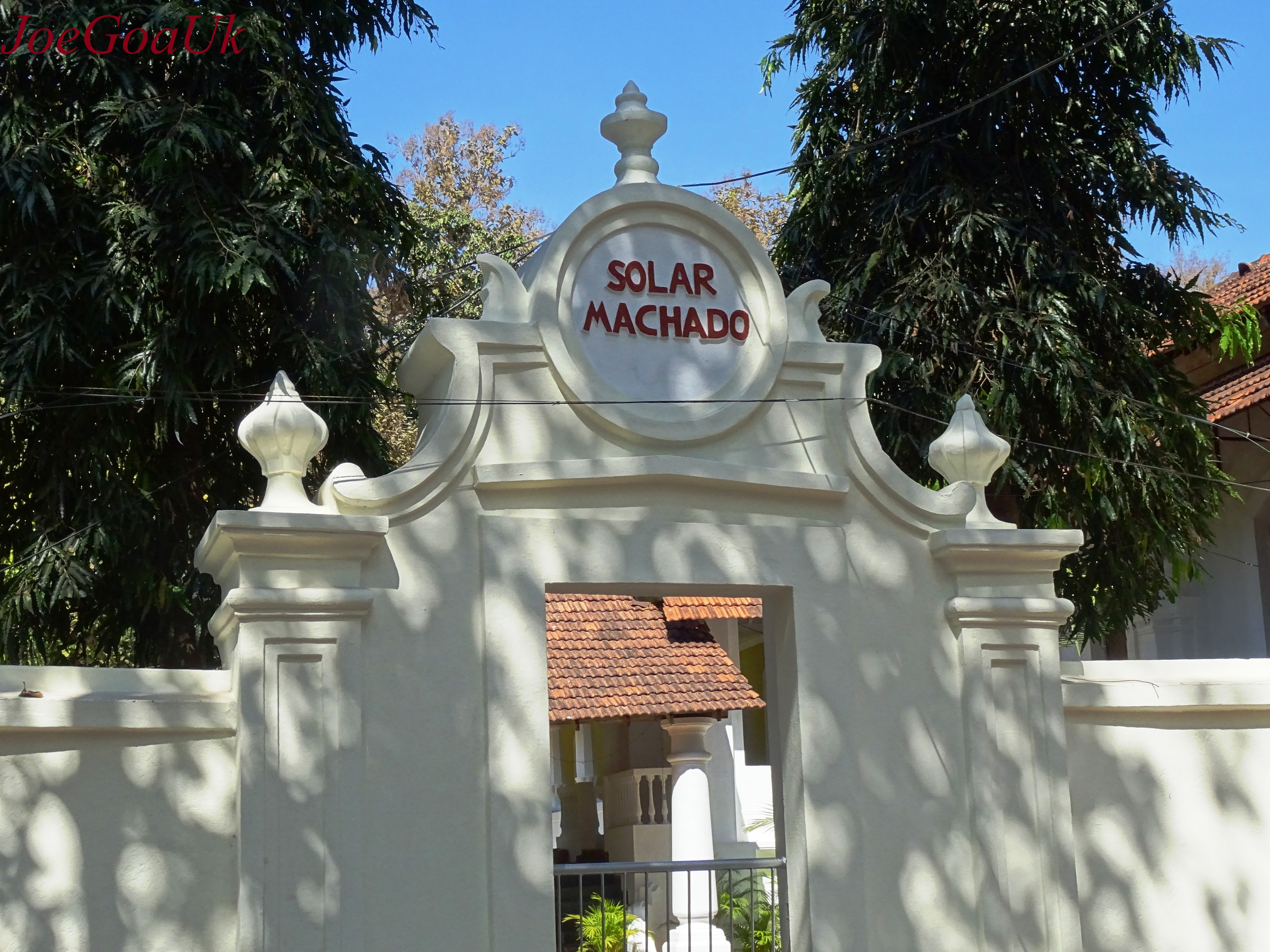
Machado's residence, Solar Machado

Froilano Carmelino da Rocha Machado was born on 22 November 1925 in Vasco da Gama, Portuguese Goa, to Carmelino da Rocha Machado. His native village was Nagoa de Verna. Machado completed his Bachelor of Arts degree at St. Xavier's College at Bombay (now Mumbai). He later completed his higher studies in entrepreneurship at Bombay University.

== Activism ==
Machado was a member of the National Congress (Goa) (NCG). In June 1946, he observed a strike at the high school in Vasco da Gama, Goa, where he was employed as a teacher. The protest was held due to the manhandling of independence activist T. B. Cunha by the Portuguese police earlier that week, at another protest that had followed the events of Goa Revolution Day. Machado was arrested and beaten by the police with the butts of their rifles. He was subsequently dismissed from his job.

On 22 August 1947, he and Y. V. Kolvalkar were elected as Joint Secretaries of the Students' Committee of the NCG. They then distributed pamphlets. On 20 June 1954, his house was searched and he was subsequently arrested and tried by the Portuguese Tribunal Military Territorial (TMT). He was later released on 29 July 1954 due to lack of evidence.

== Personal life ==
Machado was married to Sara (Sarita) Souza, and together the couple had three sons and two daughters.

== Post-annexation of Goa ==
Machado was a leader of multiple social and political organisations after the Indian annexation of Goa. While he was part of many Central Government organisations, he was also the president of the Mormugão Dock Labour Board (MDLB) and the president of Mormugão Stevedores Association.

== Political career ==
Machado was elected as a Member of Legislative Assembly (MLA) of the Goa, Daman, and Diu Legislative Assembly in 1977 and 1980, representing the Cortalim Assembly constituency. He was the speaker from 21 January 1980 to 22 March 1984. Machado was also the treasurer of the Goa Pradesh Congress Committee.
