= Daman and Diu Lok Sabha constituency =

Lok Sabha constituency in Dadra and Nagar Haveli and Daman and Diu

Coordinates: 20.42°N 72.83°E

Daman and Diu
- Lok Sabha constituency
- Interactive Map Outlining Dadra and Nagar Haveli Lok Sabha constituency

Constituency details
- Country: India
- Union Territory: Dadra and Nagar Haveli and Daman and Diu
- Established: 1987
- Total electors: 1,34,189
- Reservation: None

Member of Parliament
- 18th Lok Sabha
- Incumbent Umeshbhai Patel
- Party: IND
- Alliance: None
- Elected year: 2024

Daman and Diu Lok Sabha constituency is one of the two Lok Sabha constituencies in the union territory of Dadra and Nagar Haveli and Daman and Diu in western India. This constituency came into existence in 1987, following the implementation of the Goa, Daman, and Diu Reorganisation Act, 1987 (Act No. 18 of 1987).

== Members of Parliament ==
Successful parties from Daman and Diu Lok Sabha
1. BJP (6 times) (54.5%)
2. INC (4 times) (36.4%)
3. Independent (1 time) (9.09%)

Election	Member	Party
Before 1987: Seat did not exist
1987 (Note: by-election)	Gopalbhai Tandel	Indian National Congress
1989	Devjibhai Tandel	Independent
1991	Devjibhai Tandel	Bharatiya Janata Party
1996	Gopalbhai Tandel	Indian National Congress
1998	Devjibhai Tandel	Bharatiya Janata Party
1999	Dahyabhai Patel	Indian National Congress
2004	Dahyabhai Patel	Indian National Congress
2009	Lalubhai Patel	Bharatiya Janata Party
2014	Lalubhai Patel	Bharatiya Janata Party
2019	Lalubhai Patel	Bharatiya Janata Party
2024	Patel Umeshbhai Babubhai	Independent

== Election results ==
=== 1987 by-election ===
- The constituency did not exist at the time of 1984 general election, but was specially created in 1987 when Goa became a state, and Daman and Diu ceased to be associated with Goa.
- Gopal Kalan Tandel (Indian National Congress) : 17,027 votes
- Narayan Srinivasa Fugro (independent) : 9,303 votes

=== 2004 ===
2004 Indian general elections: Daman and Diu
Party	Candidate	Votes	%	±%
INC	Patel Dahyabhai Vallabhbhai	27,523	49.51	
BJP	Gopal K. Tandel	26,916	48.42	
BSP	Dhodi Dhiru Ranchhod	1,152	2.07	
Majority		607	1.09	
Turnout		55,591	70.16	
INC hold		Swing		

=== 2009 ===
2009 Indian general elections: Daman and Diu
Party	Candidate	Votes	%	±%
BJP	Lalubhai Patel	44,546	65.48	
INC	Patel Dahyabhai Vallabhbhai	19,708	28.97	
NCP	Tandel Gopalbhai Kalyanbhai	2,144	3.15	
Majority		24,838	36.51	
Turnout		68,024	71.32	
BJP gain from INC		Swing		

=== 2014 ===
2014 Indian general elections: Daman and Diu
Party	Candidate	Votes	%	±%
BJP	Lalubhai Patel	46,960	53.83	+11.46
INC	Ketan Patel	37,738	43.26	+14.29
AAP	Kessur Goan	729	0.84	+0.84
BSP	Bhavesh Patel	490	0.56	+0.56
NOTA	None of the above	1,316	1.51	−−−
Majority		9,222	10.57	−25.95
Turnout		87,233	78.01	+4.28
BJP hold		Swing		

=== 2019 ===
2019 Indian general elections: Daman and Diu
Party	Candidate	Votes	%	±%
BJP	Lalubhai Patel	37,597	42.98	−10.85
INC	Ketan Patel	27,655	31.62	−11.64
Independent	Umesh B Patel	19,938	22.79	
NOTA	None of the above	1,487	1.70	+0.19
BSP	Sakil Latif Khan	792	0.91	
Majority		9,942	11.36	+0.61
Turnout		87,473	71.85	−6.16
BJP hold		Swing		

=== 2024 ===
2024 Indian general election: Daman and Diu
Party	Candidate	Votes	%	±%
Independent	Patel Umeshbhai Babubhai	42,523	46.02	▲23.23
BJP	Lalubhai Patel	36,298	39.28	▼3.70
INC	Ketan Dahyabhal Patel	11,258	12.18	▼19.44
NOTA	None of the Above	978	1.06	▼0.64
Majority		6,225	6.74	▼4.62
Turnout		92,410	68.77	▼3.08
Independent gain from BJP		Swing		

== See also ==
- Daman and Diu
- 1987 Daman and Diu by-election
- Dadra and Nagar Haveli (Lok Sabha constituency)
- List of constituencies of the Lok Sabha
