= Zenito Cardozo =

Indian gangster (born 1988)

- Born: Zenito Francisco Cardozo; 1 December 1988 (age 37); Ribandar, Goa, India
- Occupations: Gangster; history-sheeter; gang leader
- Years active: 2008–present
- Employer: Rohan Khaunte (former)
- Opponent: Miranda gang; Imran Bepari; Boom Boom gang
- Allegiance: Bang Bang
- Conviction: Culpable homicide (2016)
- Criminal charges: Murder, attempted murder, robbery, extortion, vandalism, criminal conspiracy, assault, threat, prostitution, burglary
- Penalty: 3 years rigorous imprisonment (2016)

Zenito Francisco Cardozo (born 1 December 1988) is an Indian gangster, history-sheeter, and the gang leader of the Bang Bang gang based in St. Cruz. He first gained notoriety in 2008 during the attack on social activist Aires Rodrigues and historian Prajal Sakhardande. Since then, he has been a key figure in over a dozen criminal incidents in North Goa.

== Early life ==
Zenito Francisco Cardozo was born on 1 December 1988 in Ribandar, Goa, to Vicente Cardozo and Maria De Lourdes Alexandrina Graca Gomes e Cardozo (née Gomes) (1957–2013). Before his criminal involvement, Cardozo was characterized as a reclusive resident of St. Cruz, Goa, who lived in a small ancestral home and had no employment history.

== Criminal career ==
=== 2008 attack case ===
On 13 October 2008, an incident thrust Cardozo into the public eye when Aires Rodrigues, an advocate and activist, was assaulted by a group of seven individuals at a bar in Panaji. Rodrigues, accompanied by historian Prajal Sakhardande and other friends, was dining when the attack occurred. As a result of the assault, Rodrigues sustained an injury to one of his fingers and required immediate medical attention, leading to surgical intervention at a local hospital.

In January 2009, the Panaji police, citing a lack of evidence, filed a chargesheet in a local court under the provisions of the Arms Act, 1959, charging seven individuals, including Cardozo, Sandeep Vaigankar, Shabbir Gujarati, Asif Badiger, Aslam Badiger, Yakut Walikar, and Dinesh Patil, with attempted murder in relation to the alleged attack on Rodrigues.

On 30 November 2015, the North Goa District Court acquitted all six accused individuals involved in the Rodrigues attack case, while Dinesh Patil remained a fugitive. The acquittals were granted on the basis of the benefit of doubt, as both the victims and witnesses testified that all the accused individuals were wearing monkey caps, impeding their identification. Pratima Vernekar, serving as the public prosecutor, represented the State during the proceedings. The investigation of the case was conducted by police inspector Francis Corte, who held the position of inspector of the Panjim Police Station at that time. Rodrigues expressed his belief that the investigation had been conducted in a manner that rendered conviction implausible.

=== 2009 Siridao gang clash ===
On 10 May 2009, an incident unfolded involving Cardozo, which garnered attention. Cardozo single-handedly engaged in a physical confrontation with the Miranda group, who were based in Merces, Goa, at Siridao beach. The altercation ensued due to the alleged mistreatment of Cardozo's sister by the Miranda gang earlier that same day. The confrontation escalated into a violent encounter involving hand-to-hand combat and the use of knives, resulting in two fatalities and three individuals sustaining serious injuries. However, Cardozo was acquitted of all charges after undergoing a trial. During the clash, Cardozo himself sustained injuries and received medical treatment at the Goa Medical College in Bambolim. Cynthia, Cardozo's sister, made allegations implicating Rodolfo Fernandes, the son of St. Cruz MLA Victoria Fernandes, in the incident. Cynthia further asserted that Cardozo was unjustly implicated and did not possess any weapon during the altercation. She also claimed that the police deliberately impeded the investigation by threatening multiple eyewitnesses through telephone communication. The veracity of these claims can potentially be substantiated by examining the phone records with mobile operators, Cynthia stated.

Cynthia asserted that Cardozo was compelled to defend himself against a group of notorious individuals, namely Francis D'Souza, alias Miranda, aged 36, Prakash Naik, alias Pokka, and their associates, in order to avoid being lynched to death. In light of these allegations, Cynthia demanded that the investigation into the incident be entrusted to either the Crime Branch or the Central Bureau of Investigation (CBI). She communicated her plea by writing letters to the Chief Minister of Goa, Director General of Police (DGP), and Chief secretary. The reporter in Old Goa stated that Rodolfo denied the accusations against him, alleging that they were orchestrated by people with specific motives aiming to damage his character. Likewise, Prakash Naik, a Merces panchayat member, refuted the accusations made by Cynthia, asserting that he and Rodolfo were not behind the purported violent assault on Cardozo. Cynthia had publicly stated in a press conference that Naik, along with Rodolfo, orchestrated the attack on Cardozo. Naik rejected these accusations as a mere strategic political tactic aimed at tarnishing their reputation in the public eye.

Addressing reporters at his residence in Merces, Goa, Naik revealed that he had not received any official communication from the police about his supposed role in the event. Nevertheless, he expressed his willingness to cooperate fully with the authorities. Naik clarified that his only involvement in the matter was transporting Miranda to the Goa Medical College in Bambolim after the altercation between Miranda and Cardozo had taken place. Naik further asserted that he had no knowledge of any existing animosity between Cardozo and Miranda, if indeed there was any. Naik emphasized that he was unaware of any conflict between Cardozo and Miranda, if it existed. He denied making the alleged phone call to Rodolfo Fernandes, as claimed by Cynthia during her press conference. He explained that his visits to Rodolfo's residence were solely related to overseeing developmental projects in his ward, leaving no opportunity for discussions relating to the incident.

On 29 July 2016, the additional sessions court in Mapusa rendered a verdict in the case involving the violent incident that transpired at Siridao beach in 2009, resulting in the deaths of two individuals. In response to this incident, Cardozo, a key figure in the event, was sentenced to a term of three years imprisonment by the court. According to the prosecution's presentation, Cardozo, accompanied by his associates Mahavir Nadar and Domnic Nazareth, engaged in a heated altercation with two individuals, Santosh Kalel, aged 37, from Zuarinagar and Johnny Fernandes from St. Cruz, Goa, at a local shack located on Siridao beach. The confrontation escalated, leading to a violent clash between the two opposing factions involving the use of glass bottles and knives. Kalel, who was associated with the Miranda gang, was dead at the scene, while Fernandes succumbed to his injuries during treatment at the Goa Medical College and Hospital in Bambolim.

After the event took place, the Agacaim police initiated legal proceedings by filing a murder case against Cardozo and his associates for the death of Kalel. Additionally, they filed an attempted murder case against individuals such as Miranda, Fernandes, and others who were linked to the attack on Cardozo and his group. In the detailed ruling, the court cleared Cardozo of murder charges but convicted him of culpable homicide not amounting to murder. It concluded that the event was not planned but a spontaneous outcome of a sudden altercation. Nadar and Nazareth were also found not guilty of any accusations. Judge Vijaya Pol of the additional sessions court issued the verdict, sentencing Cardozo to three years of rigorous imprisonment under Section 304 (II) of the law. Cardozo was further given a three-year term of rigorous imprisonment under Section 326. Furthermore, the court imposed a fine of ₹10,000 (equivalent to ₹16,000 or US$160 in 2026) on Cardozo, taking into consideration his role in the deaths of Kalel and Fernandes.

== Personal life ==
Cardozo is a resident of St. Cruz, Goa, and is the owner of a bungalow in that area. He has two sisters named Cynthia and Maria. On 12 June 2013, Cardozo's mother, Maria, who resided in Kuwait, died. The funeral service took place two days later at Holy Cross Church in St. Cruz. As of July 2020, Cardozo resided with his aunt; however, she was subsequently admitted to Manipal Hospital in Dona Paula for medical treatment. Additionally, Cardozo has established connections with prominent politicians, including Tourism Minister Rohan Khaunte, and formerly served as his personal bodyguard.

== See also ==
- Goa mafia
