= Santa Cruz, Goa =

Santa Cruz Calapor
- Village
- Location of Santa Cruz in Goa Santa Cruz (India)
- Coordinates: 15°28′15″N 73°50′35″E
- Country: India
- State: Goa
- District: North Goa
- Sub-district: Ilhas de Goa

Population (2021)
  - Total: 21,000
- Time zone: UTC+5:30 (IST)
- PIN: 403005
- Area code: 0832

Santa Cruz is a village in the taluka of Ilhas in the North Goa district, Goa, India, situated immediately southeast of Panjim, the state capital, on Tiswadi island. The village's earlier name, Calapor, is traced by some historians to a 1107 AD copper-plate inscription in which the Kadamba king Shashtadeva II granted these lands to an administrator named Kalapa Kelima, from whom the settlement may have taken the name "Kalapa-Pur." After the Dominican Order began construction of a church dedicated to the Holy Cross (Santa Cruz) here in 1546, on the orders of the King of Portugal, completed by 1565, the village gradually became known by the church's name.

Historically an agrarian village of paddy fields and salt pans on the khazan (reclaimed wetland) lands bordering the Rio de Ourem estuary, Santa Cruz was also home to two Goans elevated to Portuguese nobility, Baron Purushottam "Baba" Quencro (Barão de Calapor) and Baron Krishnagiri Dempo. It remains one of the larger villages in Goa, with an estimated population of around 21,000.

== Population ==
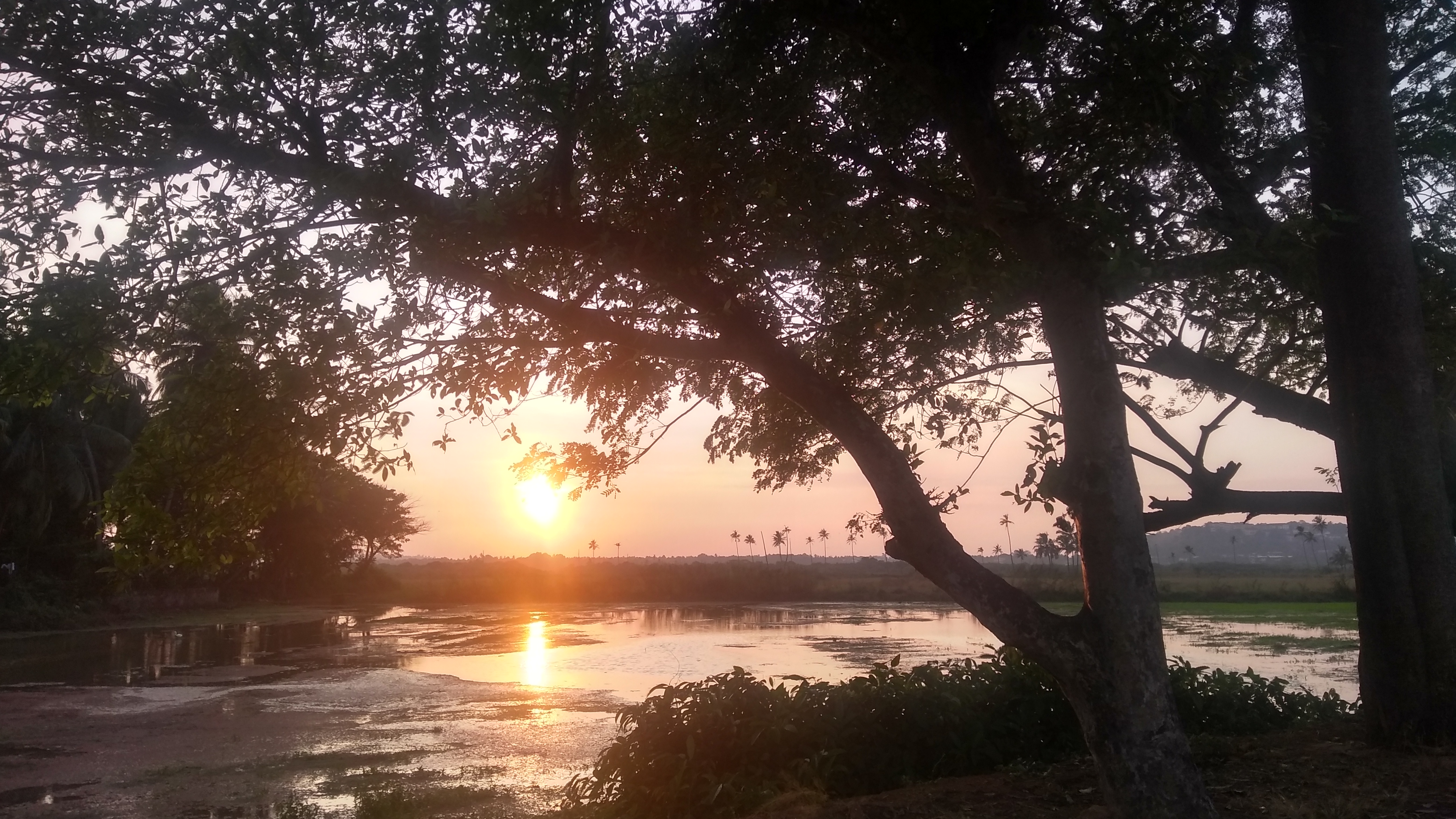
Sunset at Santa Cruz, along the road leading to Panjim.

Santa Cruz (meaning holy cross in Portuguese) is the largest village in Goa with a population of 21,000 people different religions and also who trace their origins to different parts of India.

Urban Population of Santa Cruz Villages
Year	Calapor	Cujira	Santa Cruz (total)
2001			
2011	14077	1229	15306
2021			

== Location ==
Geographically, it is situated in the North Goa district in the Sub-District of Ilhas de Goa (which means Islands of Goa, in Portuguese) or Tiswadi (thirty villages in Konkani) taluka or sub-district.

Santa Cruz is bounded north-west with the khazan lands (reclaimed wetlands) (where the Char Khambe or four pillars are located), north with Rio de Ourem (river of gold estuary, in Portuguese). Its neighbouring villages are Merces ("à mercê de" translates to "at the mercy of") village which stretches from the north-east to the east (on the east side of the NH 17), Bambolim which stretches from east to the south and Taleigao which stretches from the south to the west. Panjim, the capital city of the state of Goa located on the largest of the islands, is to its northwest.

== Village geography ==
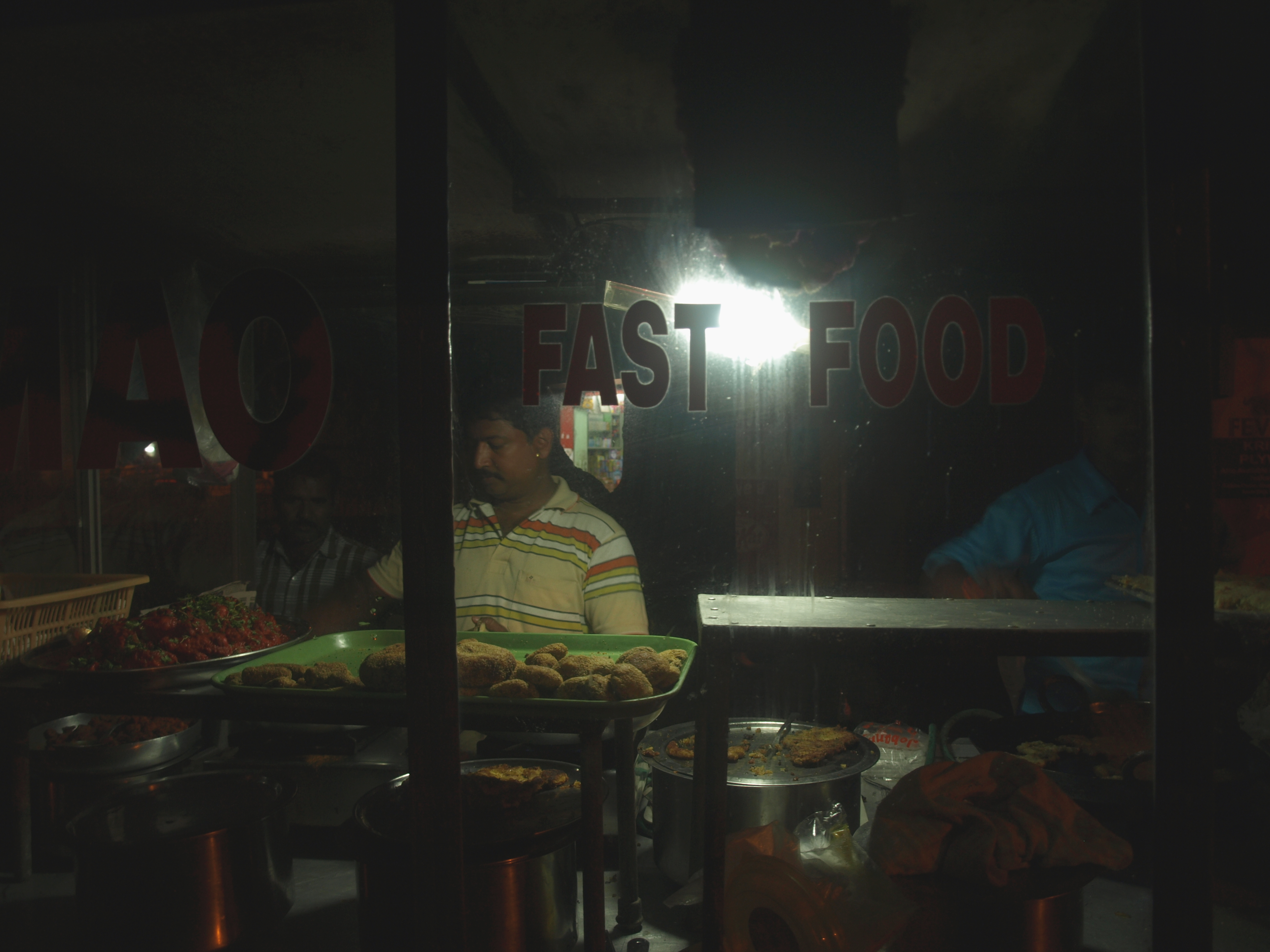
Fast food, Santa Cruz-style.

This village is sub-divided into 11 wards, each of which has its own individuality within the village. These include Bandh Vaddo (or Bandhar) (southwest of Santa Cruz Church at the foot of Taleigao hillocks), Bondir (around northeast of the Santa Cruz church, near the Rio de Oureum estuary to its southeast), Cabesa Ward (around south of Santa Cruz church at the foot of Bambolim hillocks), Primeiro Bairro (around Santa Cruz church at sea level), Segundo Bairro (north of Santa Cruz Church at sea level). St. Agostinho (Marod/Maddir) was the first part of the village, its earliest settler was JL De Araujo.

== Places of interest ==
Santa Cruz has several places of interest. Among these are, Almacho Khuris (Souls Cross), Char Khambe (Four Pillars), Saint Anthony's Chapel, and its disappearing salt pans (mithagar or mithache agor) which form a part of the reclaimed waterlogged khazan (muddy fields with sludge) lands that are also used for aquaculture, pisciculture and agriculture.

=== Santa Cruz Market ===
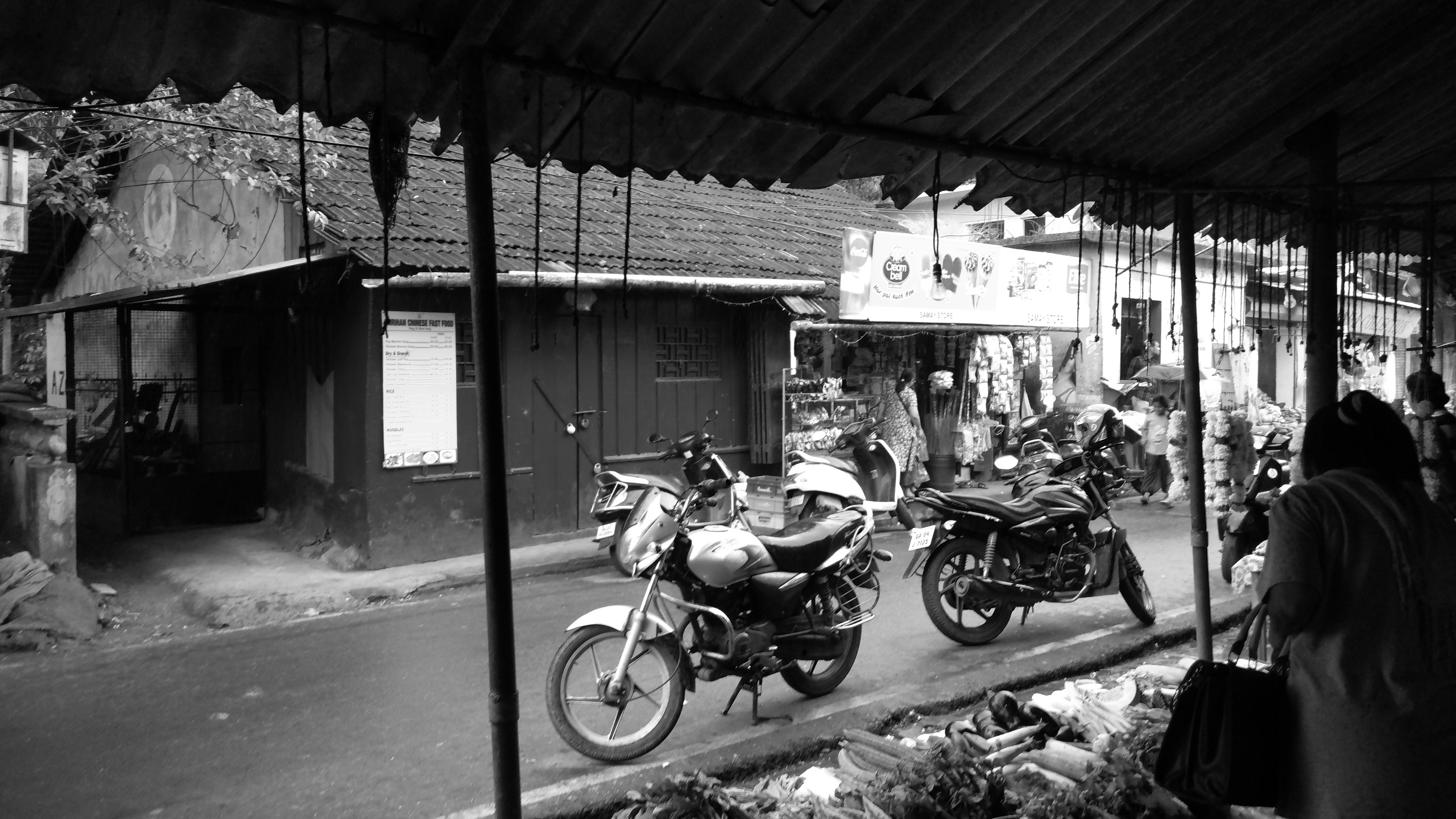
The Santa Cruz village market.

Santa Cruz Market is a village market on Pinto Road off the Old Hwy near the Santa Cruz Church. Local residents usually go to the market for fresh vegetables, fruits, meat and seafood. Processed meats such as sweetbreads and Goan sausages are also available.

=== Bondava Lak/Bondvol Lake ===
This is a small man made lake in Bandhar part of Santa Cruz village. This lake is also called as Bondovonnchem Tollem (Tollem is Konkani for Lake), and Bonda Lake. It was created during the Portuguese era, Bondvol lake was the main source of irrigation to Bandhar area of St. Cruz and its surrounding areas when agriculture was the main occupation. Following development the lake water was also used for drinking. The lakes water was released prior to the monsoon season in late May, and residents of Bandhar were provided with a bountiful harvest in mid May. The released water flowed under the salt bridge on the road linking Santa Cruz and Taleigao () into the Rio de Ourem.

Around the First World War 1914-1918, during the Portuguese era an earthen dam was built by St Cruz (Calapor) comunidade (land that belongs to the community). The lake has a catchment area that is 12.14m deep and 180m long. Over the years, over 100 species of birds have nested and migrated near lake Bondava/Bondval.

=== JL GOA ===
The First shop founded by Samuel and Miguel in 1877 is a notable establishment in Goa, renowned for selling traditional Goan alcohol. This historic shop has become a significant cultural landmark, attracting both locals and tourists who are eager to experience authentic Goan beverages and ambience. It has preserved its heritage throughout the centuries, making it a valuable part of St. Cruz's rich cultural and historical landscape. Visitors to the shop can enjoy a variety of traditional Goan spirits, offering a unique glimpse into the local traditions and lifestyle.

=== Almacho Khuris ===
Santa Cruz shares a border, in the northwest, with Taleigao village, and has an unusual story of how a boundary dispute was settled. The Taleigaokars (villagers of Taleigao accusing the Calaporkars, their counterparts in Santa Cruz, of encroaching into their territory where there are valuable rice paddy fields. To this, the communities agreed to consult an oracle to settle the boundary dispute.

The night before the oracle was to be consulted, the Calaporkas dug a hole on the border and lowered a wooden coffin containing one of their men, "the patriotic Calaporkar", who could breathe through a tube, and then covered the hole.

So on the next day, when the time of decision arrived, both village leaders implored the oracle to answer their prayer. A long silence prevailed. The villagers comunidade leaders kept repeating in turns "To whom does this land belong?" And from the depths of the earth a faint voice replied: “Calapor! Calapor! Calapor!” to the smartly executed plan of pseudo joy and pseudo exultation of the Calaporkars who pretended to be very surprised. The deceived Taleigaokars accepted the oracle verdict and went home west—surprised, sad and frustrated.

The Calaporkars also had to go home and had to return to dig “the patriotic Calaporkar.” Everyone in Calapor made merry the whole night with caju feni—and the few who had secretly plotted this activity forgot their compatriot inside the coffin as they were drunk with caju feni. The Calapor villagers returned on the third day to the disputed territorial location to dig up the coffin, only to observe that the poor man had already died. In the coffin, they found mostly worms crawling. As a symbol of self punishment, to find a smart solution for a smart boundary disputed settlement they decided to remember the deceased human who was the patriotic Calaporkar. Hence, each villager took the worms and tied a worm on right side of his hip string which held his tambdi (red) kasti/cashti (loin cloth) in place (this coined the phrase "Bhenddak Kiddo” or “waist worm”). Goa is a land of tambdi mathi (red mud/soil) and tambdi kasti (red loin cloth in the bygone days). On the very location, tradition says, stands the “Almacho Khuris” (Soul's Cross) which faces the Santa Cruz Church, Ilhas, Goa. The concrete Almacho Khuris monument about 10’ tall commemorates the boundary disputes triumph and tragedy after Christianity replaced traditional symbols. Hence, every Calaporkar villager is referred to as “Bhenddak Kiddo.” The Almacho Khuris is a historic border dispute monument which lies on a bandh between villages of Santa Cruz and Taleigao.

=== Char Khambe ===
The Four Pillars or the 'Char Khambe', as they are called in the Konkani language, are painted white, and are located in the khazan lands on the old Santa Cruz–Panjim roads in the marshy area of the Rio de Ourem (Portuguese for 'River of Gold'). This road is now named as Vasantrao Dempo Marg. During Portuguese rule, freedom fighters gathered here and held meetings and discussions, making it a very important landmark in Goa. It was built in 1896.

The khazans (Wetlands) — which refer to low-lying land situated near creeks or river side which is normally below high tide level—is situated on the St Cruz stretch. The area is surrounded by rice paddy fields on both the sides (north and south). It is one of the busiest roads in Panjim. With the hustle bustle all day long, the four pillars about 15' tall each, two on each side of the road may appear to be just another structure. Physically, the site act as a buffer between the hectic urban environment of city of Panjim and the serene village environs of Santa Cruz. The place, is part of the unique Goan landscape, is very fragile and irreplaceable in nature and any thoughtless human intervention can cause drastic and irreparable consequential damage in the long run. The site is a low-lying tidal flood plain and is part of the natural drainage pattern during the rainy season on account of the surrounding topography.

The marshy wetland is a host to mangrove vegetation which plays a definite role in the maintenance of vital ecological balance. The place is also a popular habitat to a wide variety of local and migratory birds and is a bird-watcher's delight. It is quite common to find researchers and bird lovers from distant countries here, with their trained cameras. This place finds mention on the Internet along with the Karmali lake, Chorao, Mayem lake and others in Goa. But for the locals here, they are not just structures. There are sluice gates at this structure, which controlled the flow of marine water for the salt pans, which are on the south. The north area is an estuary with plenty of flora and fauna. This area is believed by some locals to be haunted, with the haunting at its peak on full moon nights. According to the commuters who have travelled via the stretch, there is an eerie feeling that prevails at the spot. They have also claimed to have sighted some apparitions in the nights. Locals say that the area is cursed and this is one reason for the numerous accidents taking place here. Other sightings reportedly include those of a lady dressed in a white saree and supposedly asking for a lift. People also claim of hearing cries and have even had a sudden breaking down of bikes as soon as they reach the Char Khambe.

In Goa, administration over government functions and agricultural policy of each village is undertaken by a unique, inherited hierarchy called comunidade. This structure is one of the longest-established in India. Previously, comunidade were responsible for turning waterlogged lands (khazans) along the coasts into suitable plots for farming and resource exploitation.

== Religious institutions ==
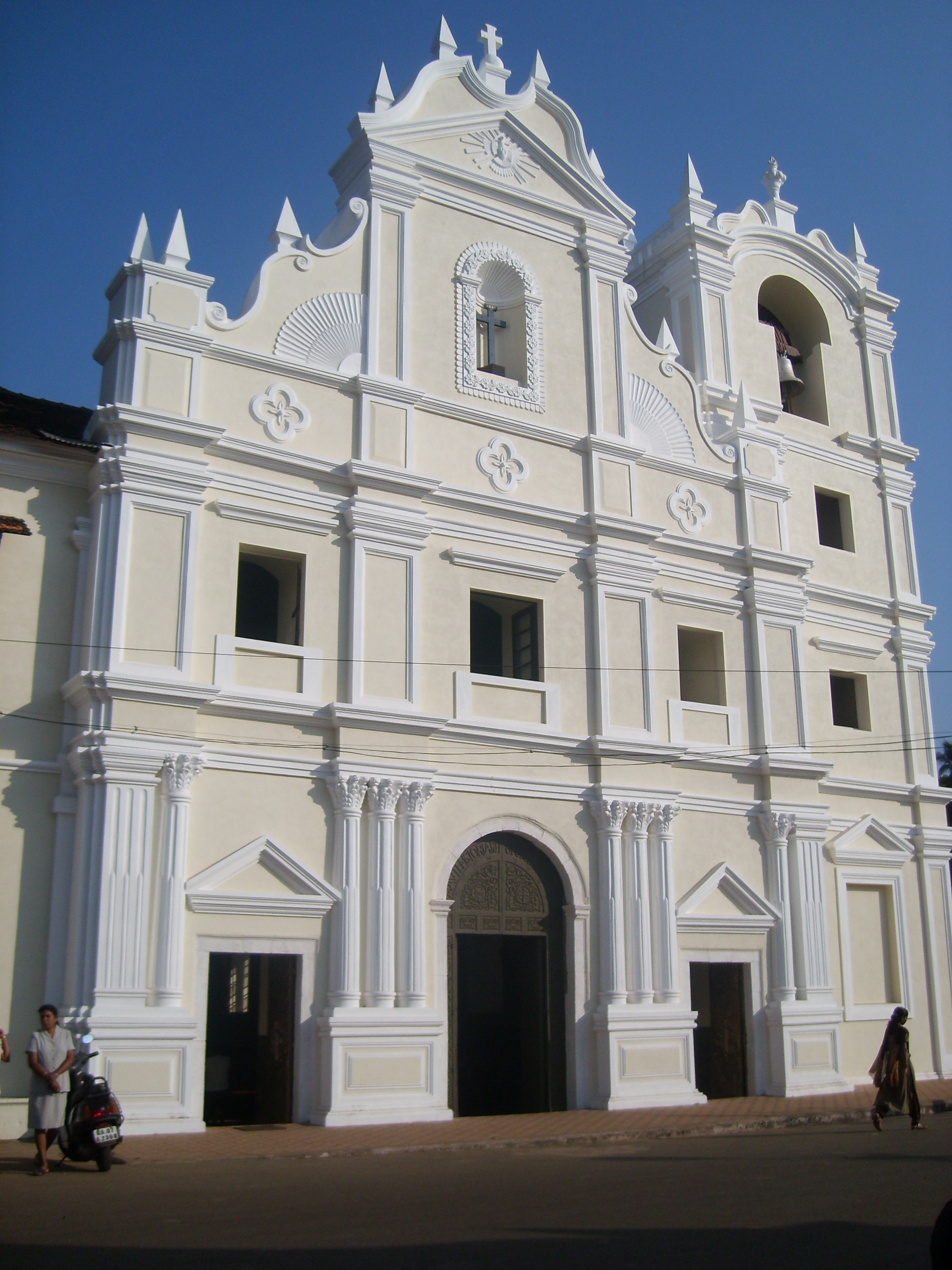
The village church, located at the heart of the village.

=== Santa Cruz Catholic Church ===
The Igreja de Santa Cruz (Igreja means church in Portuguese, and Santa Cruz is the Holy Cross) is one of the several churches in Ilhas de Goa which was built in 1547. It is also the only church in the neighborhood, serving one of the largest parishes in Goa. The Santa Cruz parish celebrates the parish feast of the Holy Cross which falls on the Sunday between 2 and 8 May every year and the feast of Our Lady of Rosary which takes place on the fourth Sunday of every January. Both these feasts are preceded by a novena, special church services run for a period of nine days in the church. An important festive occasion is the annual paddy harvest festival which is held on 24 August every year, a popular festival full of pomp where a church priest blesses the new crop produced.

==== St. Sebastian Chapel ====
This is a small catholic chapel located in Bandh Vaddo, St Cruz. The priest from Santa Cruz church, provide a weekly Sunday mass for the Catholics of Bandh.

==== St. Anthony's Chapel ====
This is a newer small catholic chapel in Bandh Vado, Santa Cruz.

==== St. Agostinho's Chapel ====
This is a small catholic chapel in Marrod/Maddir, Santa Cruz.

==== St. Anna Chapel ====
This is a newer small catholic chapel Cabesa, Santa Cruz.

==== Our Lady of Velankanni Chapel ====
This is a newer chapel located on the northwestern side of Santa Cruz, near the Char Khambe. This Chapel is surrounded with green rice paddy fields and brackish water.

=== Saint Thomas Mar Thomas Church ===
This is a Christian church, following the Saint Thomas the Apostle. It is located in Cabesa, Santa Cruz.

=== The Pentecostal Mission Panjim ===
This is a Christian church. It is located in Cabesa, Santa Cruz.

=== Shantadurga Temple Hindu Temple ===
This is the large Hindu temple in Calapor. It is located off Alto Santa Cruz Road (Old Highway) in Cabesa Ward, Santa Cruz.

=== Shri Ravalnath Brahm Vathari Devasthan ===
The Shri Ravalnath Temple was built in the 16th century. This small temple was destroyed by the Portuguese. The Hindu Temple Shri Ravalnath Brahm Vathari Devasthan is a rebuilt structure.

=== Masjid Ul Aqsa ===
This is the only mosque in vicinity of Santa Cruz, Goa, but is located in Merces village along the National Highway 66. There is a Masjid Baja a school for Muslim students.

== Educational institutes ==
There are several educational institutes in Santa Cruz.

=== Santa-Cruz Higher Secondary School ===
The oldest multi story educational complex is located in Primeiro Bairro, near Santa Cruz Church. It is Calapor’s higher secondary school.

=== Mushtifund Aryaan Higher Secondary School ===
This is a newer multi story educational is called Cujira Integrated School Complex, Cujira village adjacent to St Cruz.

== Santa Cruz Football Ground ==
This is a football ground off the Old Highway in Bondir, Santa Cruz Village. High school students get their start here through various intra- and intre- school competitions.

== Government and politics ==
The Santa Cruz village has a village panchayat, it is represented in the State Legislature and the citizens are represented in North Goa Lok Sabha constituency.

=== Santa Cruz Village Panchayat ===
Santa Cruz village comprises 11 wards. They are Raulo Bandh, St. Agostinho (Marod/Maddir), Segundo Bairro, Odlem Bhat, Ubo Dhando, Bandh, Aradi, Premeiro Bairro, Khursachi Ghol, Cabesa, and Bondir.

The current Sarpanch Namdev J. Naik(Ulhas Naik), leads the panchayat and is assisted by deputy Sarpanch (Mrs) Indira A.C. Fernandes which has a total eleven members.

Santa Cruz is part of St. Cruz (Goa Assembly constituency) and North Goa (Lok Sabha constituency).

=== Santa Cruz State Assembly ===
St. Cruz (Goa Assembly constituency) is also the name of a constituency of the Goa Legislative Assembly and is currently represented by Congress politician Rodolfo Fernandes of the Indian National Congress party. At one stage, this was the electoral constituency of the prominent Goan politician Dr. Jack de Sequeira.

Following is a list of the politicians who represented the constituency:

Legislators representing Santa Cruz Constituency
Year	Legislator	Party
1963	Jack de Sequeira	United Goans Party
1967	Jack de Sequeira	United Goans Party
1972	Jack de Sequeira	United Goans Party
1977	Joshua De sequeira	Janata Party
1980	Michael Fernandes	Indian National Congress (Urs)
1984	Francisco Branco	Independent
1989	Victor Gonsalves	Indian National Congress
1994	Victoria Fernandes	Independent
1999	Victoria Fernandes	Indian National Congress
2002	Victoria Fernandes	Indian National Congress
2007	Victoria Fernandes	Indian National Congress
2012	Atanasio Monserrate	Indian National Congress
2017	Antonio Fernandes	Indian National Congress
2022	Rodolfo Fernandes	Indian National Congress

== Notable people ==
- Padmashri Vasantrao S. Dempo (Industrialist), founder of umbrella company known as V.S. Dempo & Co.

== Architecture ==
Santa Cruz Crib 2007

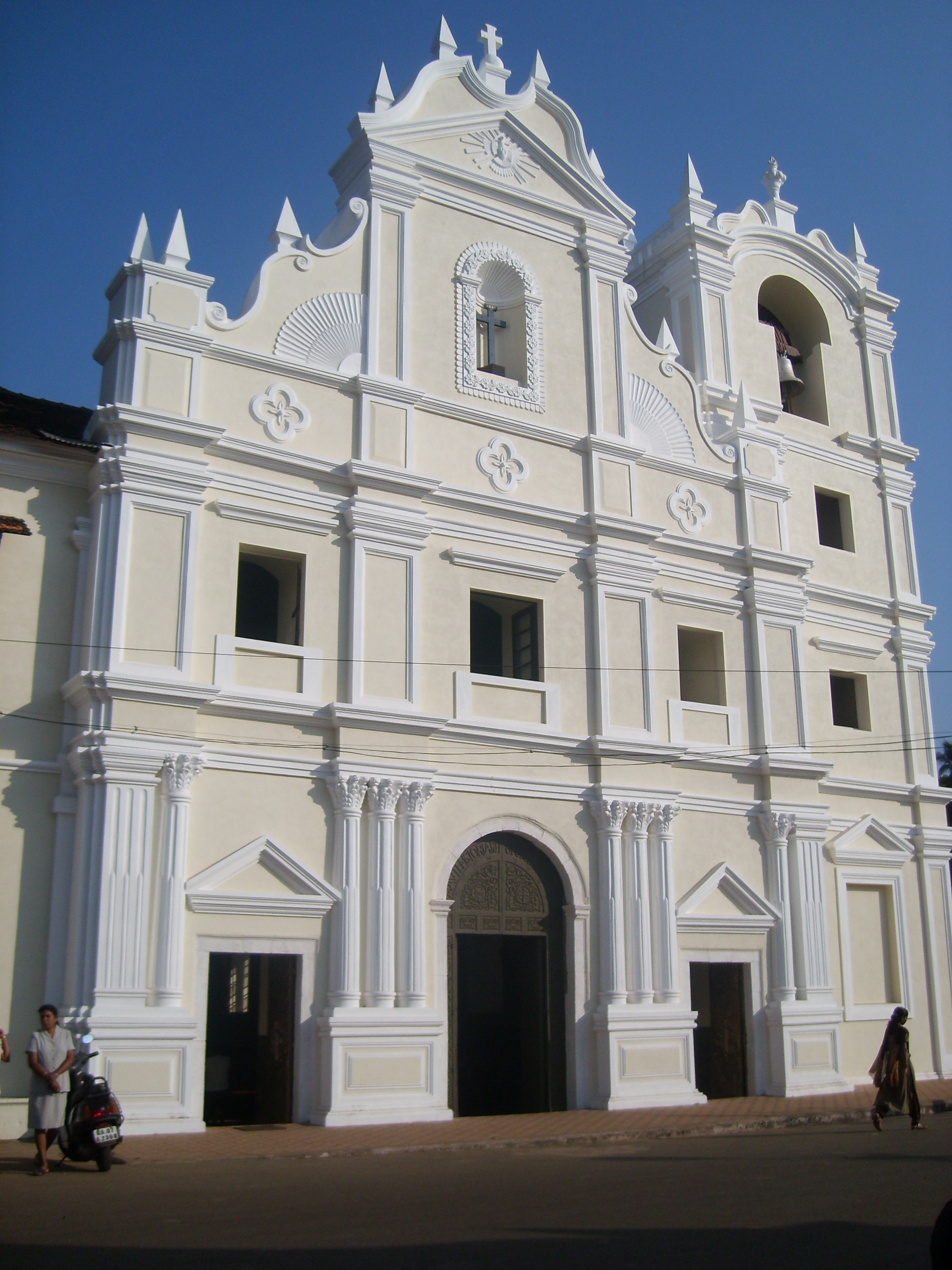
Santa Cruz Church, Goa

Modern House in Santa Cruz
