= North Goa Lok Sabha constituency =

Lok Sabha constituency in Goa

Coordinates: 15.67°N 73.81°E

North Goa GA-1
- Lok Sabha constituency
- Interactive Map Outlining North Goa Lok Sabha constituency

Constituency details
- Country: India
- Region: Western India
- State: Goa
- Assembly constituencies: 20: Mandrem, Pernem, Bicholim, Tivim, Mapusa, Siolim, Saligao, Calangute, Porvorim, Aldona, Panaji, Taleigao, Santa Cruz, St. Andre, Cumbarjua, Maem, Sanquelim, Poriem, Valpoi and Priol
- Established: 2009
- Total electors: 5,80,577
- Reservation: None

Member of Parliament
- 18th Lok Sabha
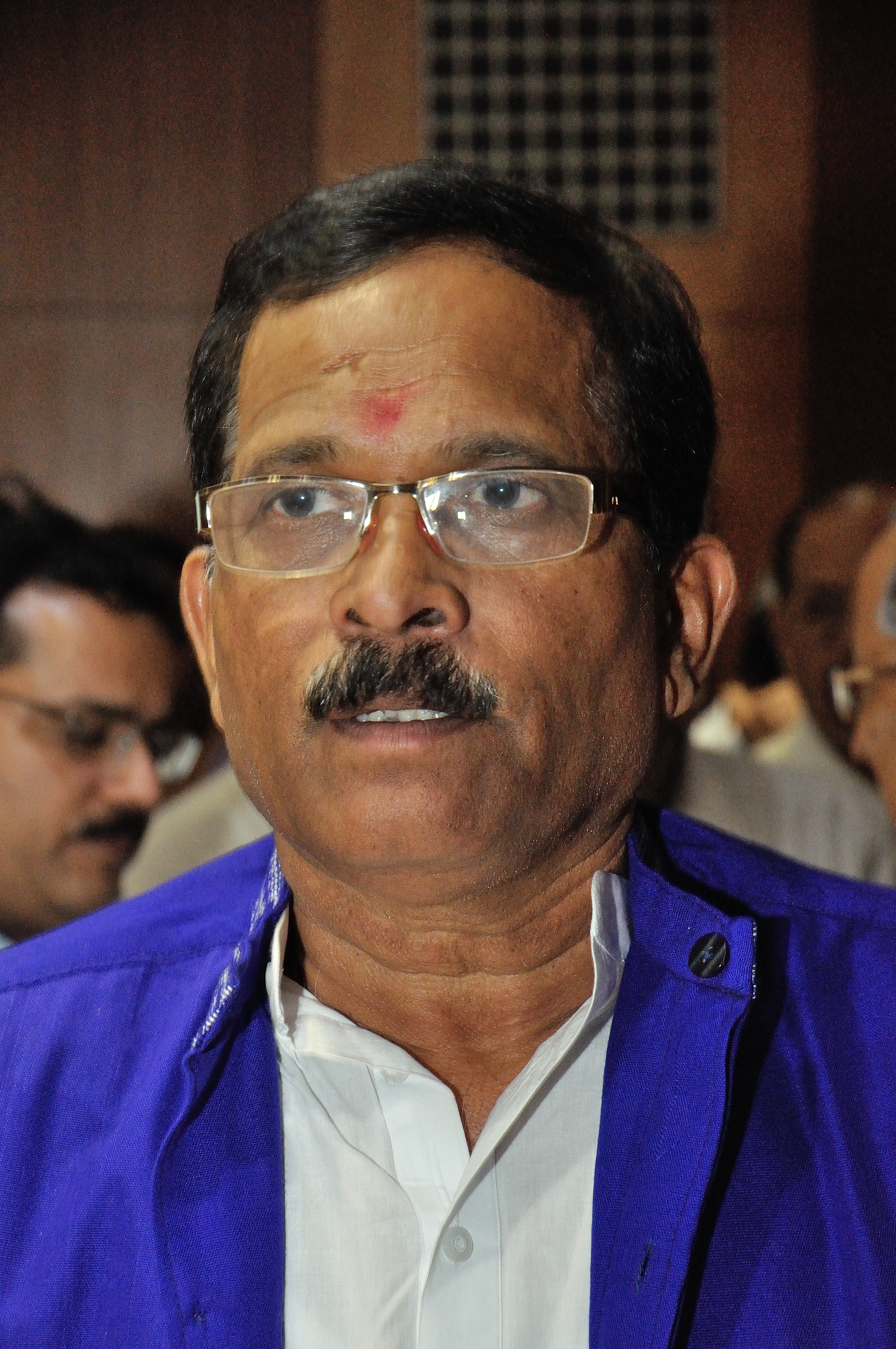
- Incumbent Shripad Yesso Naik
- Party: Bharatiya Janata Party
- Elected year: 2024

North Goa Lok Sabha constituency (formerly, Panaji Lok Sabha constituency) is one of the two Lok Sabha (parliamentary) constituencies in Goa state in western India along with South Goa.

== Assembly segments ==
Presently, North Goa Lok Sabha parliamentary constituency comprises 20 Vidhan Sabha (legislative assembly) constituencies:

#	Name	District	Member	Party	Leading (in 2024)
1	Mandrem	North Goa	Jit Arolkar	MGP	BJP
2	Pernem (SC)	North Goa	Pravin Arlekar	BJP	BJP
3	Bicholim	North Goa	Chandrakant Shetye	IND	BJP
4	Tivim	North Goa	Nilkanth Halarnkar	BJP	BJP
5	Mapusa	North Goa	Joshua D'Souza	BJP	BJP
6	Siolim	North Goa	Delilah Lobo (Note: Joined BJP in Sept 2022)	BJP	BJP
7	Saligao	North Goa	Kedar Naik	BJP	BJP
8	Calangute	North Goa	Michael Lobo	BJP	INC
9	Porvorim	North Goa	Rohan Khaunte	BJP	BJP
10	Aldona	North Goa	Carlos Alvares Ferreira	INC	INC
11	Panaji	North Goa	Atanasio Monserrate	BJP	BJP
12	Taleigao	North Goa	Jennifer Monserrate	BJP	BJP
13	Santa Cruz	North Goa	Rodolfo Fernandes	BJP	INC
14	St. Andre	North Goa	Viresh Borkar	RGP	INC
15	Cumbarjua	North Goa	Rajesh Faldessai	BJP	BJP
16	Maem	North Goa	Premendra Shet	BJP	BJP
17	Sanquelim	North Goa	Pramod Sawant	BJP	BJP
18	Poriem	North Goa	Deviya Rane	BJP	BJP
19	Valpoi	North Goa	Vishwajit Rane	BJP	BJP
20	Priol	South Goa	Govind Gaude	BJP	BJP

== Members of Parliament ==
Vote share of Winning candidates
2024	56.43%
2019	57.12%
2014	58.51%
2009	47.10%
2004	56.84%
1999	54.96%
1998	28.27%
1996	43.40%
1991	58.18%
1989	48.69%
1984	42.97%
1980	38.92%
1977	44.29%
1971	48.25%
1967	40.62%

Year	Member	Party
Panjim Lok Sabha
1962	Pundalik Gaitonde^	Indian National Congress
1962	Peter Alvares^^	Maharashtrawadi Gomantak Party
1967	Janardan Jagannath Shinkre	Independent
Panaji Lok Sabha
1971	Purushottam Kakodkar	Indian National Congress
1977	Amrut Shivram Kansar	Maharashtrawadi Gomantak Party
1980	Sanyogita Rane	Maharashtrawadi Gomantak Party
1984	Shantaram Naik	Indian National Congress
1989	Gopal Mayekar	Maharashtrawadi Gomantak Party
1991	Harish Narayan Prabhu	Indian National Congress
1996	Ramakant Khalap	Maharashtrawadi Gomantak Party
1998	Ravi Naik	Indian National Congress
1999	Shripad Naik	Bharatiya Janata Party
2004	Shripad Naik	Bharatiya Janata Party
North Goa Lok Sabha
2009	Shripad Naik	Bharatiya Janata Party
2014	Shripad Naik	Bharatiya Janata Party
2019	Shripad Naik	Bharatiya Janata Party
2024	Shripad Naik	Bharatiya Janata Party

^ Nominated in August 1962 and served till the first elections
^^Elected in December 1963

== Election results ==
=== 2024 ===
2024 Indian general election: North Goa
Party	Candidate	Votes	%	±%
BJP	Shripad Yesso Naik	257,326	56.43	▼0.69
INC	Ramakant Khalap	1,41,311	30.99	▼7.41
RGP	Manoj Parab	45,693	10.02	New
BSP	Milan R Vaingankar	1,625	0.36	N/A
NOTA	None of the Above	6,328	1.39	▼0.26
Majority		1,16,015	25.44	▲6.72
Turnout		4,57,222	78.73	▲1.68
BJP hold		Swing	▼0.69	

=== 2019 ===
2019 Indian general elections: North Goa
Party	Candidate	Votes	%	±%
BJP	Shripad Yesso Naik	244,844	57.12	−1.39
INC	Girish Chodankar	1,64,597	38.40	+5.86
NOTA	None of the above	7,063	1.65	+0.23
AAP	Dattatray Padgoankar	4,756	1.11	−2.79
RPI	Amit Atmaram Korgoankar	2,809	0.66	+0.66
IND	Bhagawant Sadanand Kamant	2,427	0.57	+0.57
IND	Aishwarya Arjun Salgoankar	2,132	0.50	+0.50
Majority		80,247	18.72	−8.26
Turnout		4,29,006	77.05	−1.90
BJP hold		Swing		

=== 2014 ===
2014 Indian general elections: North Goa
Party	Candidate	Votes	%	±%
BJP	Shripad Yesso Naik	237,903	58.51	+11.39
INC	Ravi S. Naik	1,32,304	32.54	+32.54
AAP	Dr. Dattaram Desai	15,857	3.90	+3.90
NOTA	None of the above	5,770	1.42	−−−
CPI	Suhas Naik	5,640	1.39	−1.57
IND	Dayanand Narvekar	4,128	1.02	+1.02
Majority		1,05,599	25.98	+23.79
Turnout		4,06,631	78.95	
BJP hold		Swing		

=== 2009 ===
2009 Indian general elections: North Goa
Party	Candidate	Votes	%	±%
BJP	Shripad Yesso Naik	137,716	47.10	
NCP	Jitendra Raghuraj Deshprabhu	1,31,363	44.92	
CPI	Christopher Fonseca	8,646	2.96	
MGP	Raut Pandurang Dattaram	6,638	2.27	
Majority		6,353	2.17	
Turnout		2,92,295	60.02	
BJP win (new seat)				

== As Panaji constituency ==
=== 2004 ===
2004 Indian general election: Panaji
Party	Candidate	Votes	%	±%
BJP	Shripad Yesso Naik	144,842	56.84	
NCP	D'Souza Wilfred	88,629	34.78	
CPI	Christopher Oswald Fonseca	7,977	3.13	
MGP	Paresh Atmaram Raikar	5,377	2.11	
SS	Sameer Anant Bandodkar	4,027	1.58	
IND	Adv. Ramesh Sakharam Naik	2,541	1.00	
IND	Bhonsle Dhuma Rajaram	1,426	0.56	
Majority		56,213	22.06	
Turnout				
BJP hold		Swing		

=== 1999 ===
1999 Indian general election: Panaji
Party	Candidate	Votes	%	±%
BJP	Shripad Yasso Naik	104,958	54.96	
INC	Khalap Ramakant	68,237	35.73	
CPI	Christopher Fonseca	6,105	3.20	
NCP	Malik Sadanand Uttam	4,988	2.61	
SS	Sanjay Pundlik Harmalkar	2,440	1.28	
IND	Sequeira Savio Victor	2,103	1.10	
GVP	Akhadkar Sweta Shashikant	1,407	0.74	
IND	Paddy Difle	747	0.39	
Majority		36,721	19.23	
Turnout		191,093	46.20	
BJP hold		Swing		

=== 1998 ===
1998 Indian general election: Panaji
Party	Candidate	Votes	%	±%
INC	Ravi Sitaram Naik	68,224	28.27	
BJP	Raut Pandurang Dattaram	67,807	28.10	
MGP	Khalap Ramakant Dattaram	61,538	25.50	
UGDP	Gaonkar Babuso Savlo	43,719	18.12	
Majority		417	0.17	
Turnout		244,155	61.75	
Swing to INC from MGP		Swing		

=== 1996 ===
1996 Indian general election: Panaji
Party	Candidate	Votes	%	±%
MGP	Khalap Ramakant D.	92,348	43.40	
INC	Kasar Amrut Shivram	81,803	38.44	
BJP	Manohar Parrikar	36,022	16.93	
IND	Pandharinath Janardhan Kamat Dhakankar	795	0.37	
IND	Phadte Bandodkar Sitaram Ramanath	610	0.29	
IND	Cabral Anton Francis	384	0.18	
SP	Mandrekar Deelip Dattaram	371	0.17	
IND	K. M. Acharya	255	0.12	
IND	Sardessai Prataprao Naik Atmaram Shambhu	201	0.09	
Majority		10,545	4.96	
Turnout		216,081	55.77	
Swing to MGP from INC		Swing		

=== 1991 ===
1991 Indian general election: Panaji
Party	Candidate	Votes	%	±%
INC	Prabhu Zantye Harish Narayan	88,336	58.18	
MGP	Gopal Mayekar	30,892	20.35	
BJP	Manohar Gopalkrishna Parrikar	26,988	17.78	
CPI	Christopher Fonseca	2,292	1.51	
GLP	Borkar Dilip Dharma	643	0.42	
IND	Fernandes Victoria Romeo	534	0.35	
BSP	Pradip Gonkar	510	0.34	
IND	Dias Anthony Leao	379	0.25	
IND	Rohidas Kurtikar	351	0.23	
IND	Thakkar Kanubhai	322	0.21	
LKD	Mandrekar Dilip Dattaram	162	0.11	
IND	Kamat Dhankar Pandarinath Janardhan	136	0.09	
IND	Dias Thomas	131	0.09	
IND	Sanyogita J. Rane	93	0.06	
IND	Prakash Baburao Naik	58	0.04	
Majority		57,444	37.83	
Turnout		154,808	44.84	
Swing to INC from MGP		Swing		

=== 1989 ===
1989 Indian general election: Panaji
Party	Candidate	Votes	%	±%
MGP	Gopal Mayokar	116,392	48.69	
INC	Shantaram L. Naik	100,555	42.07	
BSP	Ramdas Gajanand Satardekar	4,914	2.06	
IND	Sitakant Shivaji Dubhashi	4,825	2.02	
CPI	Narayan Vithal Palekar	3,543	1.48	
BJP	Gangadhar Yeshwant Bhandare	2,957	1.24	
IND	Pandharinath Kamath Dhakankar	2,338	0.98	
IND	Sitaram R. Bandodkar	894	0.37	
IND	Ganshyam Sadashiv Satoskar	621	0.26	
JP	Hamda Issak Khan	596	0.25	
IND	Anthony Leao Dias	546	0.23	
IND	Naresh Miraji Mirajkar	477	0.20	
IND	Govind Subrai Naique	386	0.16	
Majority		15,837	6.62	
Turnout		246,357	73.76	
Swing to MGP from INC		Swing		

=== 1984 ===
1984 Indian general election: Panaji
Party	Candidate	Votes	%	±%
INC	Shantaram L. Naik	88,326	42.97	
MGP	Bandekar Motilal Bombi	48,778	23.73	
IND	Rane Sardessai Sanyogita Jaiba	29,261	14.23	
IND	Amrut Kansar	8,367	4.07	
BJP	Bhandare Gangadhar Yeshwant	7,324	3.56	
CPI	George Vaz	6,217	3.02	
IND	Ghanashyam Satoskar	5,688	2.77	
JP	Shivaji Dessai	5,007	2.44	
IND	N. B. Rao	2,352	1.14	
LKD	Naik Subhod Vithal	1,934	0.94	
CPI(M)	Gopinath Waman Rao	1,818	0.88	
IND	Shinkre J. J. (Pradeepcar)	503	0.24	
Majority		39,548	19.24	
Turnout		212,803	73.10	
Swing to INC from MGP		Swing		

=== 1980 ===
1980 Indian general election: Panaji
Party	Candidate	Votes	%	±%
MGP	Rane Sirdessai Sayogita Jaibaa	70,730	38.92	
INC(I)	Kakodkar Purshottam Keshav	43,030	23.68	
IND	Mayekar Gopal Govind	42,097	23.17	
JP	Kelekar Ravindra Rajaram	16,841	9.27	
JP(S)	Shriodkar Pandurang Purshottam	9,015	4.96	
Majority		27,700	15.24	
Turnout		187,982	71.85	
MGP hold		Swing		

=== 1977 ===
1977 Indian general election: Panaji
Party	Candidate	Votes	%	±%
MGP	Kasar Amrut Shivram	66,933	44.29	
INC	Kakodkar Purushottam Keshav	55,867	36.97	
JP	Dessai Shivajirao Govindrao	23,787	15.74	
IND	Fernandes Xavier Jacinto	3,501	2.32	
IND	Pinto Jose Antonio Floriano	568	0.38	
IND	Shivram Swaminath	470	0.31	
Majority		11,066	7.32	
Turnout		154,844	63.61	
Swing to MGP from INC		Swing		

=== 1971 ===
1971 Indian general election: Panaji
Party	Candidate	Votes	%	±%
INC	Kakodkar Purshottam	57,627	48.25	
MGP	Shenvi Talauliker Madhav Upendra	54,597	45.71	
IND	D'Souza John Mariand Matirs Siman	2,721	2.28	
INC(O)	Bir Madhav	1,712	1.43	
IND	Rao Narayan Bhikaji	1,127	0.94	
IND	Shinkre Janardhan Jaganath	1,094	0.92	
IND	Shirodkar Pandurang Purushottam	554	0.46	
Majority		3,030	2.54	
Turnout		123,115	58.95	
INC win (new seat)				

== As Panjim constituency ==
=== 1967 ===
1967 Indian general election: Panjim
Party	Candidate	Votes	%	±%
IND	S. J. Jaganath	56,764	40.62	
UGS (Note: United Goans (Sequeira Group))	K. B. Mangesh	45,810	32.78	
INC	K. A. Narsinv	15,205	10.88	
IND	L. V. Narayan	6,058	4.33	
CPI	N. Desai	5,753	4.12	
PSP	A. P. Augustus	5,337	3.82	
IND	D. L. Bernard	3,113	2.23	
UGF (Note: United Goans (Furtado Group))	M. N. Buquerque	1,714	1.23	
Majority		10,954	7.84	
Turnout		144,891	71.78	

== See also ==
- North Goa district
- List of constituencies of the Lok Sabha
