= Vasantrao S. Dempo =

Indian industrialist and philanthropist (1916–2000)

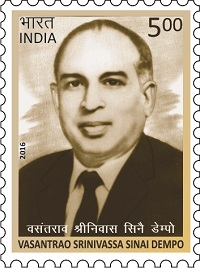
- Born: Vasantrao Shrinivas Sinai Dempo; 4 February 1916; Goa, Portuguese India
- Died: 9 November 2000 (aged 84)
- Occupations: Industrialist; philanthropist
- Years active: 1941–1990s
- Known for: Founder and owner of Dempo Group, and Dempo S.C.
- Awards: Padma Shri (1991)

Vasantrao Shrinivas Sinai Dempo (4 February 1916 – 9 November 2000) was an Indian industrialist, philanthropist and aristocrat, who founded the Dempo Group of Industries. The mining business he founded in 1941 has now grown to include interests in shipbuilding, minerals, foods, iron and steel, education, travels and construction. After annexation of Goa, he was amongst the richest people in India, his family remains the wealthiest in Goa today. His family were awarded a barony in Goa as landowners in 1873 by Luís I of Portugal. of St. Cruz, Goa and Siridao.

== Biography ==
Dempo was the founder of the Dempo S.C., a football club based in Goa, which he nurtured after acquiring the local club, Bicholim SC. Vasantrao Dempo Reflective Chair, an endowment professorship at the Tepper School of Business of the Carnegie Mellon University is named after him and is funded by the endowment of Dempo Group.

Dempo Charities Trust, the philanthropic arm of the Group runs several educational institutions in Goa. Dempo was a pioneer in Indian and European co-operation as globalization was taking off, forming the Centro de Estudos Voicuntrao Dempo (Voicuntrao Dempo Indo-Portuguese Centre), named for his brother Voicuntrao Dempo a member of Parliament in Portugal, in 1987, with himself as President, Jose Rangel of Tipografia Rangel as Director and Adv. Manohar Usgaonkar as a Trustee. The Government of India awarded him the fourth highest civilian honour of the Padma Shri in 1991.

On 4 March 2016, a commemorative postage stamp was released in his honour.
