= St. Cruz Assembly constituency =

Legislative Assembly constituency in Goa State, India

Coordinates: 15.47°N 73.84°E

Santa Cruz
- Constituency No. 13 for the Goa Legislative Assembly

Constituency details
- Country: India
- Region: Western India
- State: Goa
- District: North Goa
- Lok Sabha constituency: North Goa
- Established: 1963
- Total electors: 29,298
- Reservation: None

Member of Legislative Assembly
- 8th Goa Legislative Assembly
- Incumbent Rodolfo Fernandes
- Party: Bharatiya Janata Party

Santa Cruz Assembly constituency is one of the original Goa Legislative Assembly constituency seats in the Tiswadi Taluka of North Goa District in the State of Goa. The other constituencies in Tiswadi are Panaji, Taleigao, St. Andre and Cumbarjua.

Santa Cruz is one of the Ilha(s) (Island(s)), the other being Chorão, Divar, St. Estevam and Vaxim. The Portuguese conquered these lands as part of Velha Conquista and used it for spice trade principally and simultaneously for spiritual purposes this resulted in the establishment of Catholic faith in Goa. In 1547, the Portuguese missionaries established the Santa Cruz Catholic Church (also known by its direct translation of Holy Cross Catholic Church). Hence, this constituency has been named as Santa Cruz constituency. A landmark in Calapor/Santa Cruz is called Almacho Khuris (Cross of the Soul in Konkani). This monument was built to commemorate the death of a patriotic Calaporkar.

Jack de Sequeira, widely known for his role in Goan statehood, held this seat between 1967 and 1980.

== Members of Legislative Assembly ==
Year	Member	Party
1963	Joaquim Araujo	United Goans Party
1967	Jack de Sequeira	United Goans Party
1972	Jack de Sequeira	United Goans Party
1977	Jack de Sequeira	Janata Party
1980	Michael Fernandes	Indian National Congress
1984	Francisco Branco	Independent
1989	Victor Gonsalves	Indian National Congress
1994	Victoria Fernandes	Independent
1999	Victoria Fernandes	Indian National Congress
2002	Victoria Fernandes	Indian National Congress
2007	Victoria Fernandes	Indian National Congress
2012	Atanasio Monserrate (Note: Expelled from party in 2015. Joined the Goa Forward Party in 2017.)	Indian National Congress
2017	Antonio Fernandes	Indian National Congress
2022	Rodolfo Fernandes (Note: Elected to Indian National Congress. Switched to BJP in 2022)	Indian National Congress

== Election results ==
=== 2027 Assembly election ===
2027 Goa Legislative Assembly election: St. Cruz
Party	Candidate	Votes	%	±%
INC				
NDA				
NOTA	None of the above			
Majority				
Turnout				
gain from		Swing		

=== Assembly Election 2022 ===
2022 Goa Legislative Assembly election : St. Cruz
Party	Candidate	Votes	%	±%
INC	Rodolfo Fernandes	8,841	38.97%	▲11.05
BJP	Antonio Fernandes	6,377	28.11%	▲3.08
AAP	Amit Palekar	4,098	18.06%	▲10.36
RGP	Ajay Tipu Kholkar	2,497	11.01%	New
AITC	Victor Benjamin Gonsalves	523	2.31%	New
NOTA	None of the Above	349	1.54%	▲0.17
Margin of victory		2,464	10.86%	▲7.97
Turnout		22,685	77.43%	▼2.73
Registered electors		29,296		▲5.72
INC hold		Swing	▲11.05	

=== Assembly Election 2017 ===
2017 Goa Legislative Assembly election : St. Cruz
Party	Candidate	Votes	%	±%
INC	Antonio Fernandes	6,202	27.92%	▼12.43
BJP	Hemant Dinanath Golatkar	5,560	25.03%	New
Independent	Rodolfo Louis Fernandes	5,262	23.69%	New
MGP	Prakash Gopi Naik	2,707	12.19%	▼15.00
AAP	Jose Vincent Gomes	1,712	7.71%	New
NOTA	None of the Above	303	1.36%	New
Independent	Helena Lourenco	227	1.02%	New
Margin of victory		642	2.89%	▼8.02
Turnout		22,215	80.17%	▼3.76
Registered electors		27,711		▲8.57
INC hold		Swing	▼12.43	

=== Assembly Election 2012 ===
2012 Goa Legislative Assembly election : St. Cruz
Party	Candidate	Votes	%	±%
INC	Atanasio Monserrate	8,644	40.35%	▲4.07
Independent	Rodolfo Louis Fernandes	6,308	29.45%	New
MGP	Dinar Purshottam Kamat Tarcar	5,824	27.19%	New
CPI	Pedro Caitano Pires	221	1.03%	New
Independent	Xavier Cardo	189	0.88%	New
Margin of victory		2,336	10.91%	▲4.30
Turnout		21,421	83.77%	▲14.63
Registered electors		25,524		▼13.09
INC hold		Swing	▲4.07	

=== Assembly Election 2007 ===
2007 Goa Legislative Assembly election : St. Cruz
Party	Candidate	Votes	%	±%
INC	Victoria Fernandes	7,385	36.29%	▼3.81
BJP	Hoble Anil Raghuvir	6,040	29.68%	▼10.17
UGDP	Monserrate Jennifer A.	5,868	28.83%	▲18.24
Save Goa Front	Pilarnekar Suresh	582	2.86%	New
Independent	Pandurang Kunkolkar	123	0.60%	New
Margin of victory		1,345	6.61%	▲6.37
Turnout		20,352	69.19%	▲5.08
Registered electors		29,368		▲13.57
INC hold		Swing	▼3.81	

=== Assembly Election 2002 ===
2002 Goa Legislative Assembly election : St. Cruz
Party	Candidate	Votes	%	±%
INC	Victoria Fernandes	6,658	40.09%	▼10.59
BJP	Anil Roghuvir Hoble	6,618	39.85%	▲28.94
UGDP	Gonsalves Victor Benjamin	1,759	10.59%	New
MGP	Makandar Ramzan Imamsaheb	795	4.79%	▼14.97
NCP	Lourenco Vicento Domingos	161	0.97%	New
CPI	Maura Gregorio Sebastiao	160	0.96%	New
Independent	Lopes Jose Edgar	155	0.93%	New
Margin of victory		40	0.24%	▼30.68
Turnout		16,607	64.16%	▼2.87
Registered electors		25,858		▼0.41
INC hold		Swing	▼10.59	

=== Assembly Election 1999 ===
1999 Goa Legislative Assembly election : St. Cruz
Party	Candidate	Votes	%	±%
INC	Victoria Fernandes	8,829	50.68%	New
MGP	Hoble Anil Raghuvir	3,442	19.76%	New
Goa Rajiv Congress Party	Gonsalves William Antonio	2,973	17.07%	New
BJP	Fernandes Socorro Gonsalo	1,901	10.91%	New
Independent	Kandolkar Ramdas Sonu	243	1.39%	New
Margin of victory		5,387	30.92%	▲23.24
Turnout		17,420	66.97%	▼2.82
Registered electors		25,965		▲6.79
INC gain from Independent		Swing	▲15.56	

=== Assembly Election 1994 ===
1994 Goa Legislative Assembly election : St. Cruz
Party	Candidate	Votes	%	±%
Independent	Victoria Fernandes	5,971	35.13%	New
INC	Gonsalves Victor Benjamin	4,665	27.44%	
Independent	Hoble Anil Raghuvir	3,568	20.99%	New
BJP	Sawant Subhash Pundalik	1,766	10.39%	New
Independent	D'Braganza Antonio Gabriel	357	2.10%	New
Gomantak Lok Pox	Furtado Roque Cristovam	179	1.05%	New
BSP	Kunkalekar Pandurang Rama	102	0.60%	New
Margin of victory		1,306	7.68%	▼1.30
Turnout		16,998	68.66%	▲0.07
Registered electors		24,315		▲17.63
Independent gain from INC		Swing	▼4.56	

=== Assembly Election 1989 ===
1989 Goa Legislative Assembly election : St. Cruz
Party	Candidate	Votes	%	±%
INC	Victor Benamin Gonsalves	5,729	39.69%	New
Gomantak Lok Pox	Victoria Romeo Fernandes	4,432	30.70%	New
MGP	Mahendra Narayan Raikar	3,674	25.45%	New
Gomantak Bahujan Samaj Parishad	Audit Ramchandra Shirodkar	103	0.71%	New
Margin of victory		1,297	8.98%	▼11.20
Turnout		14,436	67.54%	▲0.70
Registered electors		20,671		▲11.03
INC gain from Independent		Swing	▼3.33	

=== Assembly Election 1984 ===
1984 Goa, Daman and Diu Legislative Assembly election : St. Cruz
Party	Candidate	Votes	%	±%
Independent	Branco Freancisco Afonso	5,537	43.02%	New
INC	Monteiro Antonicio Antonio Agnelo Marcos Castilho	2,939	22.83%	New
Independent	Fernandes Michael Antonio Carmino	2,688	20.88%	New
JP	Fernandes Victoreia Romeo	674	4.67%	New
Independent	Naik Madusudan	120	0.83%	New
Independent	Suryaji Sharadchandra Navelkar	106	0.73%	New
Margin of victory		2,598	20.18%	▲7.17
Turnout		12,872	66.12%	▼2.23
Registered electors		18,617		▲18.15
Independent gain from INC(U)		Swing	▲2.34	

=== Assembly Election 1980 ===
1980 Goa, Daman and Diu Legislative Assembly election : St. Cruz
Party	Candidate	Votes	%	±%
INC(U)	Fernandes Michael Antonic Carminho	4,574	40.67%	New
MGP	Branco Francisco Afonso	3,110	27.65%	New
JP(S)	Sequeira Jack Erasmo	2,025	18.01%	New
JP	Dhond Madhav Manohar	446	3.97%	
Independent	Shirodkar Chandrakant Kalidas	415	3.69%	New
Independent	Sarmalkar Mihanlal (Bappa) Sadashiv	159	1.41%	New
Margin of victory		1,464	13.02%	▼5.44
Turnout		11,246	68.94%	▲3.48
Registered electors		15,757		▲9.32
INC(U) gain from JP		Swing	▼4.92	

=== Assembly Election 1977 ===
1977 Goa, Daman and Diu Legislative Assembly election : St. Cruz
Party	Candidate	Votes	%	±%
JP	Jack de Sequeira	4,462	45.60%	New
MGP	Fernandes Manuel Francisco Xavier Diogo	2,656	27.14%	New
INC	Monterio Atanasio Antonio Agnelo Marcos Castilho	1,923	19.65%	New
Independent	Vazhail Kannu Gopal	242	2.47%	New
Independent	Vaigncar Krishna Arjun	235	2.40%	New
Independent	Fernandes Pio	99	1.01%	New
Independent	Ram Gangadharan	60	0.61%	New
Margin of victory		1,806	18.45%	▲0.43
Turnout		9,786	67.14%	▼2.67
Registered electors		14,414		▼12.80
JP gain from UGP		Swing	▼10.87	

=== Assembly Election 1972 ===
1972 Goa, Daman and Diu Legislative Assembly election : St. Cruz
Party	Candidate	Votes	%	±%
UGP	Jack de Sequeira	6,586	56.46%	▼1.95
Independent	Fernandes Manuel Francisco Xavier Diogo	4,483	38.43%	New
CPI(M)	Palekar Vinayak Vithal	383	3.28%	New
Margin of victory		2,103	18.03%	▼7.04
Turnout		11,664	69.28%	▼8.79
Registered electors		16,530		▲8.11
UGP hold		Swing	▼1.95	

=== Assembly Election 1967 ===
1967 Goa, Daman and Diu Legislative Assembly election : St. Cruz
Party	Candidate	Votes	%	±%
UGP	Jack de Sequeira	7,087	58.41%	New
United Goans Party (Furtado Group)	J. L. C. Araujo	4,045	33.34%	New
Independent	V. V. S. Dukle	358	2.95%	New
Independent	F. P. J. Vicente	128	1.05%	New
MGP	A. Afonso	121	1.00%	New
Independent	S. S. Nagoji	75	0.62%	New
Independent	F. G. Xavier	9	0.07%	New
Margin of victory		3,042	25.07%	
Turnout		12,133	77.33%	
Registered electors		15,290		
UGP win (new seat)				

== See also ==
- List of constituencies of the Goa Legislative Assembly
- North Goa district
