= Antonio Fernandes (politician) =

Indian politician

Member of the Goa Legislative Assembly
- In office 2017–2022
- Preceded by: Atanasio Monserrate
- Succeeded by: Rodolfo Fernandes
- Constituency: St. Cruz

Personal details
- Born: Segundo Bairo, Santa Cruz, Goa
- Party: Bharatiya Janata Party switched to 2019
- Other political affiliations: Indian National Congress until 2019
- Occupation: Politician
- Profession: Businessman, Politician

Antonio Caetano "Tony" Fernandes of the Bharatiya Janata Party represents Santa Cruz in the Goa Legislative Assembly. He lives in Segundo Bairro, Santa Cruz, Goa. He won the elections on an Indian National Congress ticket in 2017. He replaced incumbent MLA Atanasio Monserrate after the latter was expelled from the Indian National Congress party in 2015 for anti-party activities. He was one of the ten members of Indian National Congress who joined Bharatiya Janata Party in July 2019.

== Political career ==
In 2017, Antonio Caetano Fernandes, was the preferred candidate for Indian National Congress, following the expulsion of Atanasio Monserrate in 2015. Antonio Fernandes won the Santa Cruz Assembly seat by defeating Rodolfo Fernandes who ran as an Independent. Rodolfo Fernandes' mother, late former Santa Cruz MLA Victoria Fernandes, held this seat as INC candidate. Antonio won this seat with 6202 votes. Hemant Golatkar and Rodolfo Fernandes, procured 5560 and 5262 votes respectively of the 22,215 total votes.

In 2022, Antonio Fernandes, ran for the second time but now as BJP candidate. The political calculus did not reward him in 2022. Antonio Fernandes lost to Rodolfo Fernandes and is attributed to have switched to BJP party mid stream. Antonio procured 6377 votes while Rodolfo procured 8841 votes.

== Personal life ==
Antonio Caetano Fernandes is the son of Jose Fernandes. He was born and lives in Segundo Bairo, Santa Cruz, Goa. He attended Santa Cruz High School and completed Xth standard. Antonio is married to Indira Fernandes. He is a businessman with a focus in real estate.
