= Somnath Juwarkar =

Indian politician (died 2021)

Somnath Juwarkar (died 20 April 2021) was an Indian minister from the state of Goa. He was a Member of Legislative Assembly representing the Taleigao Assembly constituency from 1989 to 2002 representing the Indian National Congress. He served as a minister for Civil Supplies, Cooperation and Transport in the governments of Pratapsingh Rane and Francisco Sardinha. He died on 20 April 2021 after complications from COVID-19.
