= Bookworm Children's Library =

Coordinates: 15.4945349419°N 73.828806318°E

Bookworm is a library for children that operates out of the locality of Taleigão, near the capital city of Panjim (Panaji) in Goa, India.

The lending library is aimed "for children of all ages and abilities" and has dedicated spaces for creative activities and reading. Bookworm also runs a "program of workshops for both children and parents." It promotes cultural activities—with a needlecraft group, book discussions, a pre-school program and an adult art program. The library is located near St Michael's Church in Taleigao.

== History ==
Bookworm was launched in 2005 by Elaine Mendonsa and Sujata Noronha, both educators, with the aim of creating a library and learning space to enhance literacy and the love of books amongst the children of Goa.

In 2012, Bookworm hosted the first-ever Goa Children's Book Fest at Jardin Garcia da Orta in Panjim/Panaji, Goa.

== Bookworm Publishing ==
Bookworm Publishing is a part of Bookworm. It says: "Story books are at the heart of Bookworm's efforts to build literacy and creative thinking skills in children in and out of school." Sale proceeds from Bookworm Publishing support library work in schools and community.

== Other projects ==
To meet its goals, Bookworm is involved in a number of other activities. This includes—besides its library—the Book Treasury that lends books to institutions serving children and the Mobile Outreach Programme. The latter takes books to children who have no opportunity to access books. Cholta Cholta (a Konkani term which has been translated to "while walking") is another activity, consisting of walking tours for children, organised by Bookworm.
