= Taleigão =

- Neighborhood
- Location of Taleigão in Goa Taleigão (India)
- Coordinates: 15°28′3″N 73°49′17″E
- Country: India
- State: Goa
- District: North Goa
- Sub-district: Ilhas de Goa
- Time zone: UTC+5:30 (IST)
- Area code: 0832
- Website: goa.gov.in

Taleigão, or Platô de Taleigão, is a neighborhood located in the southern part of the city of Panaji, the capital of the Indian state of Goa. It is entirely located on the island of Tiswadi, which is one of the talukas in the state of Goa. The neighborhood is known for its important campus at the Goa University.

== Overview ==
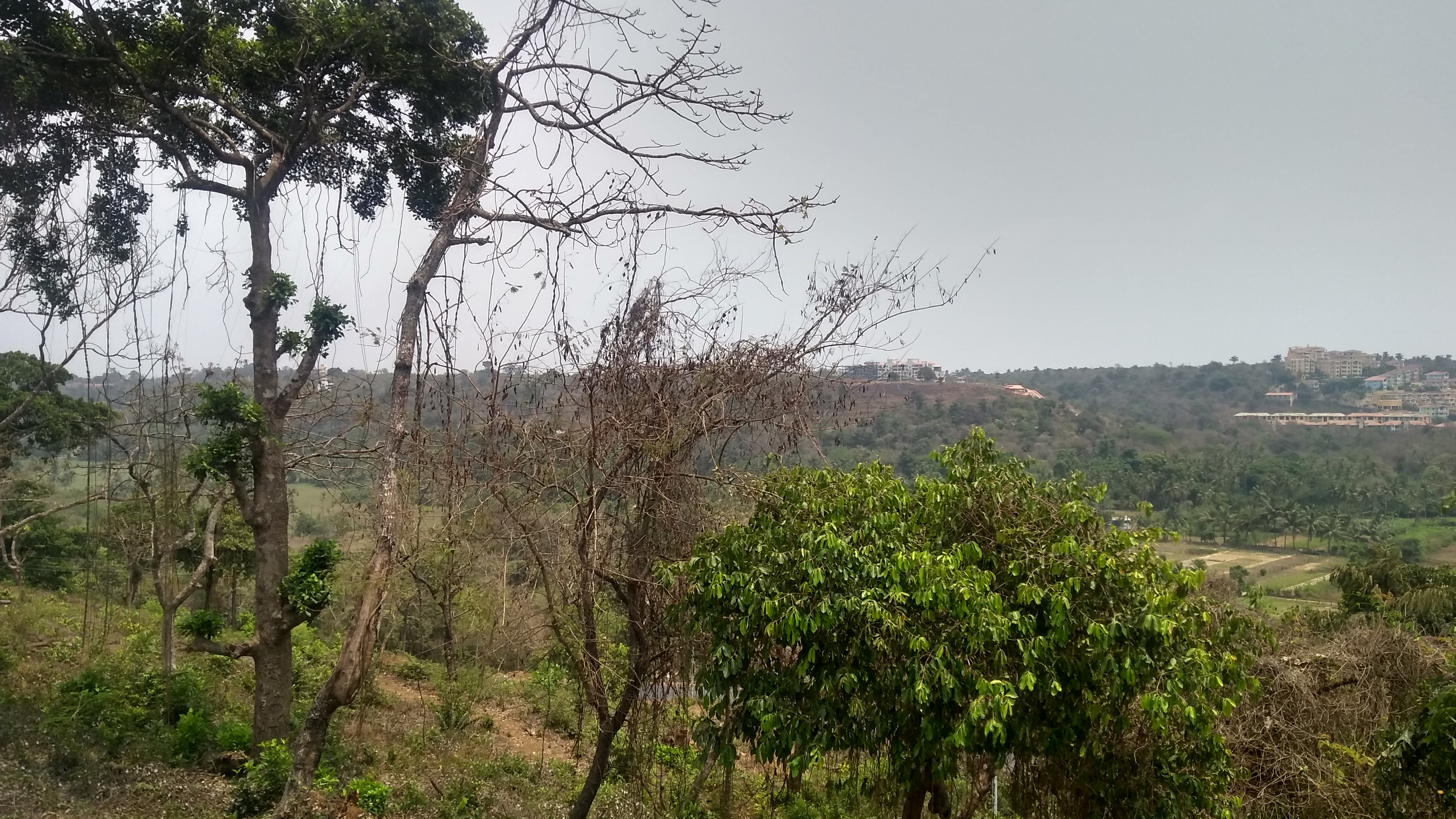
Taleigao-Bambolim area of Goa

Taleigão lies in Ilhas de Goa and is bordered by the Arabian Sea to the west, vast tracts of fields to the east, Odxel-Vaiguinim-Dona Paula to the south and Santa Inez-Bhatlem to the north. Located five kilometres from Panjim, Taleigão was considered the granary of north Goa during the Portuguese era, as vast tracts of agricultural land were then under rice cultivation.

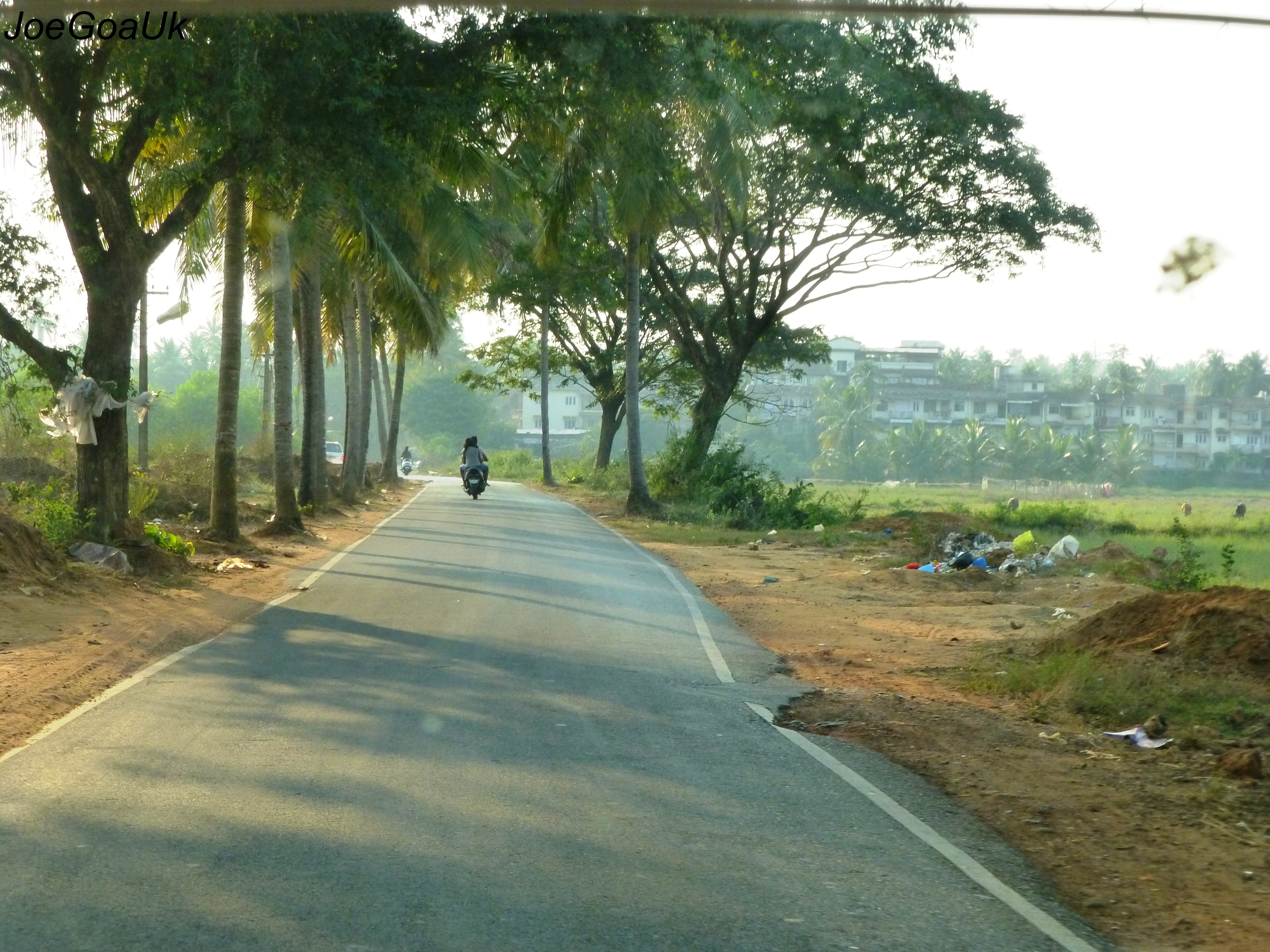
St. Cruz - Taleigao Road

Taleigão is a residential and agricultural administrative district characterized by coastal geography, lowland paddy fields, and the Nagalli hill formation. The settlement features historical residential architecture, a road network incorporating pedestrian infrastructure, a multi-denominational religious infrastructure including a centuries-old church, chapels, and temples, as well as traditional tile-work traffic circles. In addition to these physical attributes, the area contains educational facilities, commercial hospitality establishments, and a resident population.

The population is currently a mixed group with a lot of settlers from other parts of Goa and other parts of India, especially on the Dona Paula Plateau and elsewhere. The aboriginal inhabitants are the Gawda tribes who were, and some still are involved in the cultivation of the Comunidade land.

Taleigão Panchayat, the local administrative structure, has been functioning since the 1960s. The first Sarpanch (village panchayat head) of Taleigão village after the end of Portuguese rule in Goa was freedom fighter Late Narayan Naik in 1966.

== Origin of name ==
Taleigão or Taleiganv, gets its name from the local language, Konkani, Tolle-ganv, Tall-ganv or Toll-ganv. Toll-ganv, a contraction for somtoll ganv, meaning a level village, neither on a hill nor in a valley. Tall-ganv refers to the fact that Taleigão is the last village of Tiswadi, beyond which is the mouth of the river Mandovi flowing into the Arabian Sea. However, the most likely origin is Tollem-ganv. Along the path to Durgavaddi, in Taleigão, there is a tollem, i.e. a lake or a pond, which is how the name stuck, Tollea-ganv or Tolloi-ganv, the village (ganv) of the lake or pond.

== Religious institutions ==
=== Church of São Miguel Arcanjo ===
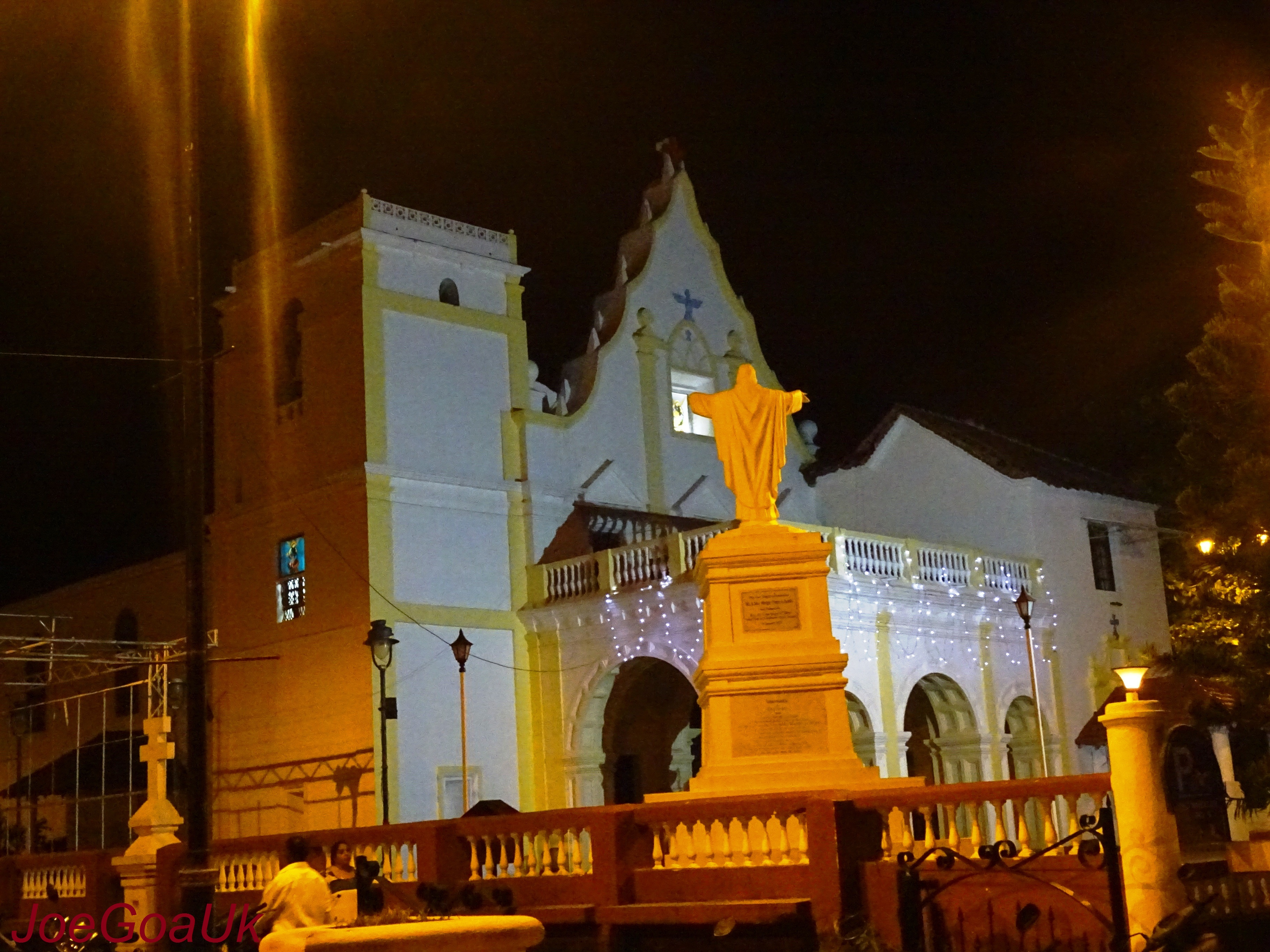
Taleigao Church

The Igreja de São Miguel Arcanjo (Church of St Michael the Archangel) is one of the oldest churches in Goa, and was built by the Dominicans in 1544. It is also the only church in the neighborhood, serving one of the largest parishes in Goa. From the census conducted in 2015 there are about 12,000 Catholic population. The Chapel of Blessed Sacrament was annexed in 2006 during the tenure of Fr. Carmo Martins. The assistant parish priest have been Fr. Xavier Braganza and parish priest is Fr. Conceiçao D’Silva, who took charge of the church in June 2011, and took the initiatives to give a facelift to the church and renovate the parochial house and church office. The compound wall fitted with azulejo tiles bordering the Adro da Igreja de São Miguel and the illumination around it were added by Atanasio (Babush) Monserrate. The Taleigão parish celebrates two main feasts: the harvest feast on 21 August, and the feast of the patron - St. Minguel - on the nearest Sunday on or after 29 September.

=== Chapels in Taleigão ===
Taleigão also has at least twelve chapels and a number of road-side crosses, some sheltered in the recent past. The oldest chapel, built by Franciscans in 1541 at Cabo, is dedicated to Nossa Senhora Mãe de Deus. It houses exquisite artefacts including a 17th-century portrait of the infant Jesus made of ivory. St. Pedro Copel, also known as Ruzai Saibinichem Copel (Nossa Senhora do Rosário) at Caranzalem was built in the year 1731 by Cónego Francisco da Cunha Souto Maior. St. Francis Xavier's Chapel at Kerant originally known as Copela de San Francisco Xavier de Taleigão was built in 1928. It was blessed on 10 October 1930 by the then Bishop of Cochin and Administrator Apostolate, its first mass celebrated on 12 October 1930. It was enlarged in 1935 and renovated in 2002. Just 100 meters from this chapel is Nossa Senhora da Piedade in Eugênio ward built by Eugênio Dias and his wife Rosa Maria Fernandes. It was blessed on November 20, 1823, but only opened to the public on November 18, 1846. Another chapel at Odxel dedicated to Nossa Senhora de Lourdes was constructed by Rev. Querobino Martins of Taleigão in November 1891. This chapel has now been handed over to the Salesians of Don Bosco. The foundation stone for the building of the chapel of Nossa Senhora do Perpétuo Socorro at Dona Paula was laid on September 21, 1935, and the chapel was blessed on May 23, 1937

=== Temples ===
There are about fifteen temples; the oldest ones being Shree Tulsimata Pandurang Sansthan at Vodlem Bhat and Shree Shankar Devasthan at Shankarwadi which were enlarged from a gumti structure which existed during the Portuguese era. Among the others, the most unusual ones is Shri Mahalaxmi Devasthan at Oitalem. Both these temples have a Cross inside the temple and candles are lit every night by Hindu devotees and Litanies are held occasionally with the involvement of the Catholic community.

=== Mosques ===
Taleigão has a mixed population of slightly over 17,000. The Catholic population is more than 12,000 followed closely by Hindus and Muslims. There are two Masjids in this village, at Vodlem Bhat and at Adarsh.

== Feasts ==
In the entire Ilhas de Goa, the Taleigão village was officially accorded the privilege by the then Portuguese Governor Afonso de Albuquerque to cut the first sheaves of rice and present it to the Creator on 21 August. Traditionally, the harvest feast is celebrated with the music of brass bands, a colourful ceremonial umbrella, cannon fire, procession and high mass at São Miguel Arcanjo church. This thanksgiving ceremony commemorates the Festa da Espiga or Novidade– a time for rejoicing and worship for the cultivators, in gratitude for the bountiful crop bestowed.

== Landmarks ==
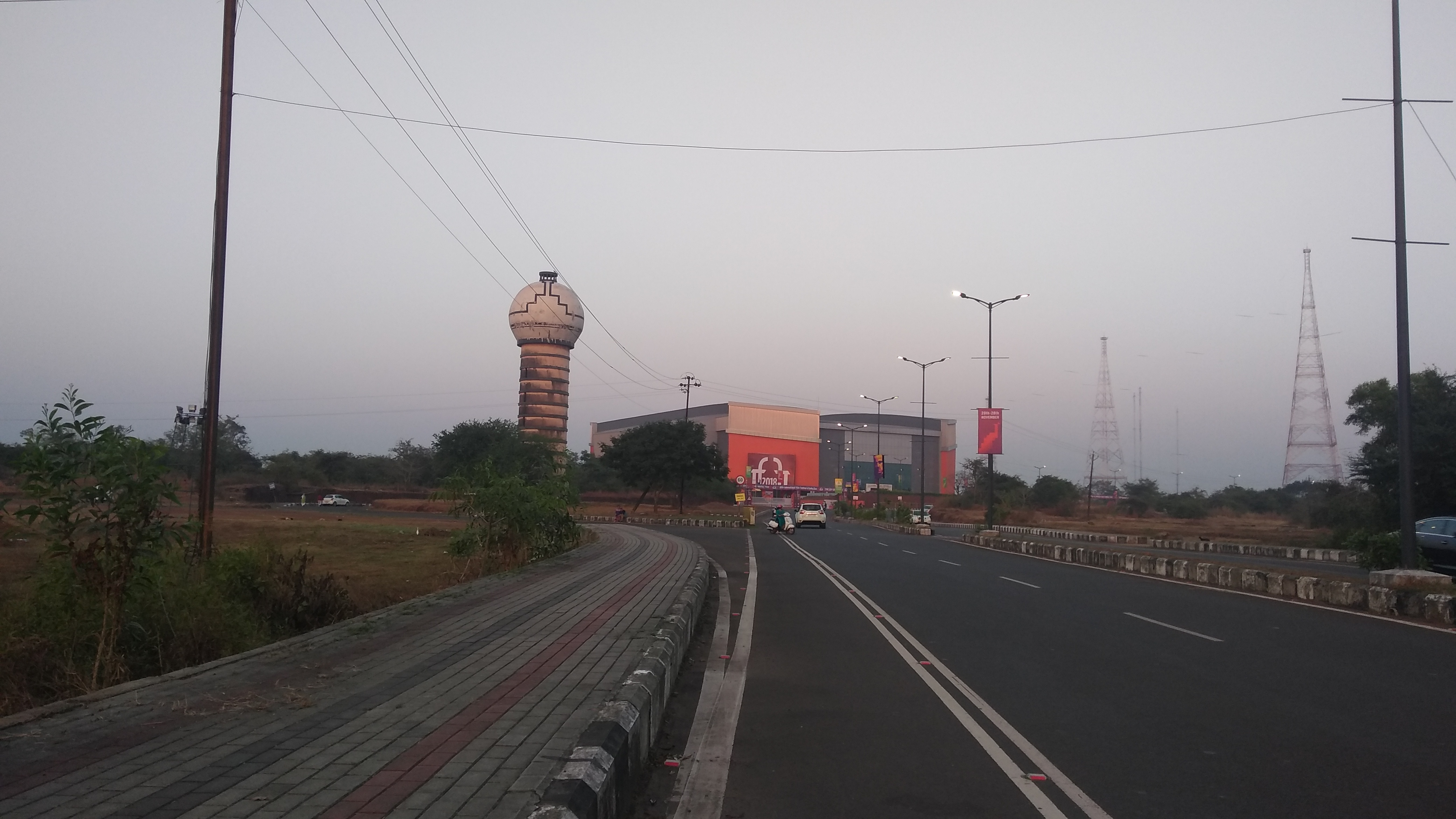
On the Goa University Road, Taleigao, Goa

Prominent landmarks in Taleigão include São Miguel Church, which was established in 1544 by preachers from the Dominican Order and is one of the oldest churches in Goa. Taleigão is also home to the Dr. Remigio Pinto Football Ground and an all-season community hall which hosts weddings, social functions, trade fairs, and other large events.

=== Educational institutions ===
Taleigão plateau hosts the main hub of higher education, Goa University. There is a higher secondary school at Dona Paula and a number of high schools, middle schools, primary schools, and pre-primary schools in Taleigão catering to the educational needs of the children. Don Bosco at Odxel run by Salesians caters to the all round development of children from the weaker sections of society. Bookworm Children's Library situated behind the church is a knowledge bank for children and meets the increasing demands of the readers. The National Institute of Oceanography at Dona Paula is one of the pioneer centres for oceanographic research in India.

=== Playgrounds ===
Football is in the blood of Taleigãokars. The church square (adró) served as the main playground where most of the village lads practiced football under the mentorship of Dr. Alvaro Remegio Pinto. Thereafter many of them, including Brahmanand Sankhwalkar, brought laurels to Taleigão by playing for professional football clubs and winning national tournaments. The Portuguese constructed the first playground at Borchem Bhat which was handed over to a club known as Grupo Desportivo de Caranzalem to encourage football in Taleigão. Dr. Alvaro Remegio Pinto was instrumental in organising football tournaments at the church square (adró). As a memory of his contribution to the football, the playground besides the Community hall bears his name.

=== Parks ===
Taleigão has a number of parks. One of the biggest parks in Taleigão is the jogger's park at Caranzalem on the Miramar – Dona Paula road. The park and playground next to the Dr. Remigio Pinto ground is also crowded with children. The parks at Durgawadi, Posrem Bhat, Nagali, Alto Nagali and landscape garden at Dona Paula are also worth mentioning.

=== Beaches ===
Taleigão's beaches include those at Odxel, Vainguinim, Dona Paula, Aivao, and Caranzalem - which have been known as picnic spots for decades. People from Old Goa, St. Estevam and Ponda still come to these beaches in the summer to bathe. The Aivao-Caranzalem bay is known for fishing activity. In the Portuguese era, the canoes used to land here with a large catch of fish including mackerel and sardines. These were salted and dried on the sand, while the excess catch was auctioned. Locals and farmers from far-off places like Merces used it as manure for agriculture and horticulture.

=== Hillock of Dona Paula ===
This place is named after Dona Paula Amaral Antonio de Souto. Dona is a title given to married noble woman under Portuguese customs. She was the daughter of Portuguese Viceroy in Sri Lanka who along with her family arrived in Goa 1644. She married Dom Antonio Souto Maior, a wealthy Fidalgo in 1656, who owned large properties extending from Cabo to Caranzalem. She was known for charity and worked for betterment of the villagers. After her death in December 1682, as a gratitude to her kindness the villagers renamed the place as Dona Paula, which was originally called Oddavell. The statues of philosopher couple Mr and Mrs. Robert Knox which were carved by German sculptor Baroness Yrse Von Leistner are seen atop the rock. One gets a splendid view of the Arabian Sea and the landscape from the hillock. The jetty which is used for navigation has been renovated and the route has been paved and illuminated recently. The water sports facilities in the vicinity also attract tourists. A large part of Hindi movie Ek Duuje ke Liye was shot here, which popularised the place further.

=== Casa do Povo de Taleigão ===
It was the community hall which was built and inaugurated by the last Portuguese Governor of Goa, General Vassalo de Silva on 21 August 1961. It houses a hall with stage, and offices of the Comunidade de Taleigão and Club de São Miguel de Taleigão. Tiatrs used to be held in the hall on the occasion of church feast. Wedding receptions were also held in olden days.

=== Taleigão Community Hall ===
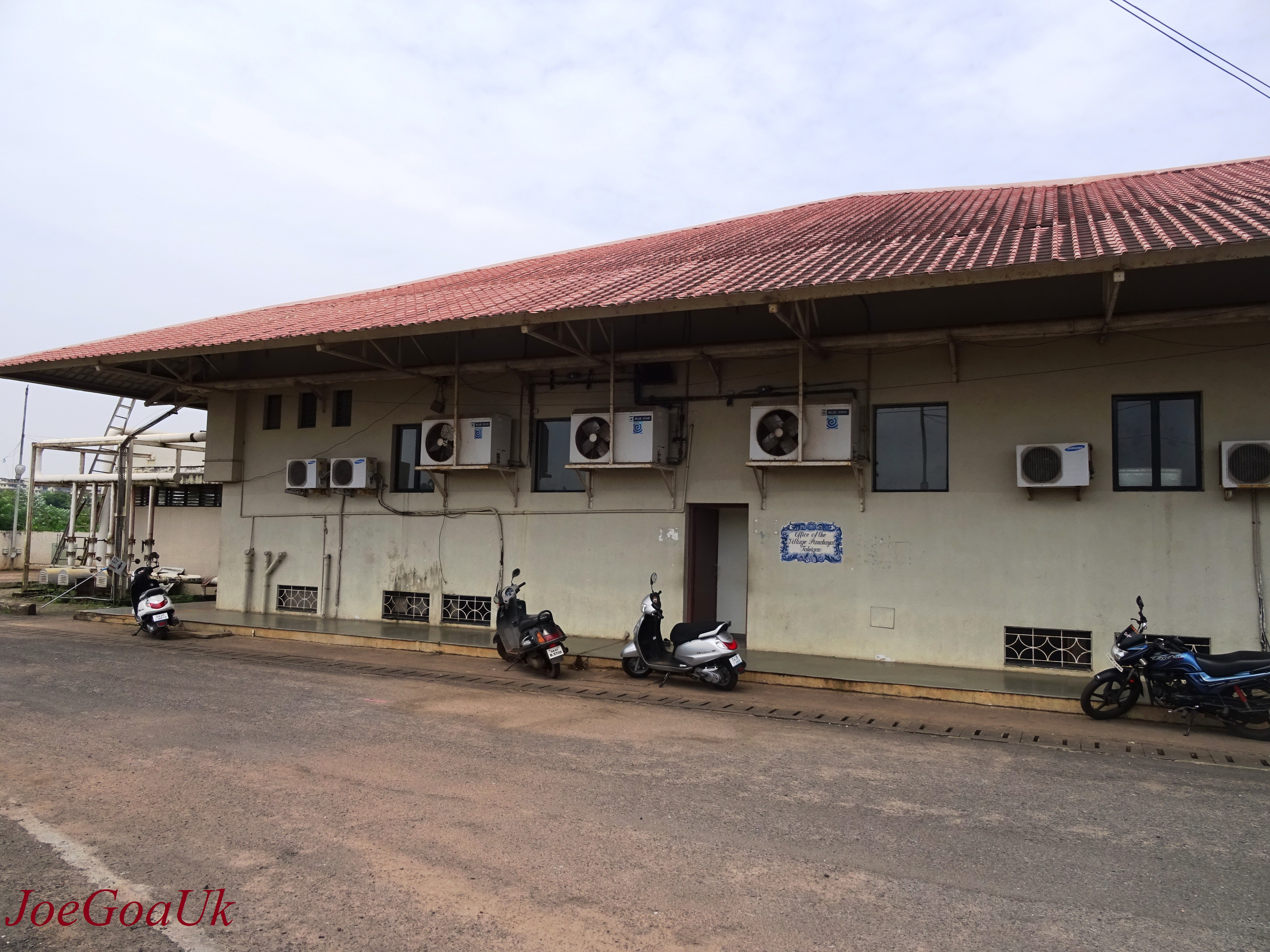
Taleigao community hall

One of the attractions of the village is the impressive, spacious and ultra-modern community hall. This all-season hall is famous for marriage receptions, international and national meetings, social gatherings, parties, etc. The interiors, illumination, outdoor stage and spacious parking are some features that attract people from all over Goa to organise various social and cultural events. The basement houses the office of the village Panchayat.

=== Cabo Raj Nivas ===
Originally a 16th-century convent built by Franciscans, it was later fortified to act as a sentinel over the confluence of the Zuari and Mandovi rivers. Later converted into a palace where the Portuguese Viceroys and Governor Generals resided. Now it is the residence of the Governor of Goa. The palace has a large Darbar hall, spacious verandahs with views of the Arabian Sea, Bohemian glass chandeliers, Chinese porcelain, antique tableware, assorted paintings and a garden. The Capela de Nossa Senhora Mae de Deus is annexed to the Cabo Raj Bhavan. Its feast is celebrated on August 15. Zig-zag steps leads to a grotto with a rock-carved altar. A small museum displays replicas of sculpture of Hindu deities dating back to the 11th century and beyond, besides some Christian icon and figurines.

=== British cemetery ===
A British cemetery exists in the vicinity which houses the graves of an 18th century British garrison led by Sir William Clarke, which entered Goa on the pretext of protecting Goa from a possible French invasion. They were stationed at the Cabo (Dona Paula), Fort Aguada and Fort Mormugao and stayed at Marivel from 1799 and 1813. The cemetery has an ornate semi-circular archway that leads to graves and memorial stones.

=== Statue of Jack de Sequeira ===
The nine-metre bronze statue of Dr. Jack de Sequeira was unveiled on 20 April 2007 at Dona Paula circle, as a tribute to the local leader who is considered the Father of the Opinion Poll in Goa and a staunch promponent of Goa's identity.

=== Dr Shyama Prasad Mukherjee Indoor Stadium ===
Bambolim Athletic Indoor Stadium is an indoor stadium located on the campus of Goa University. The stadium was constructed for the 2014 Lusophony Games for events of volleyball and basketball. The stadium is named after Dr Shyama Prasad Mukherjee former Indian politician and the founder of Bhartiya Jana Sangh. The stadium has a seating capacity of 4000 and was inaugurated by Governor of Goa Bharat Vir Wanchoo in 2014. It cost 82 crore and was built in 11 months.

== Government and politics ==
Taleigão is part of Taleigao (Goa Assembly constituency) and North Goa (Lok Sabha constituency).

== Sports ==
Clube Sao Miguel de Taleigao, an association football club based in Taleigão, represents them in Goa Professional League, Goa's top tier.
