= Rudolf Fernandes =

Indian politician

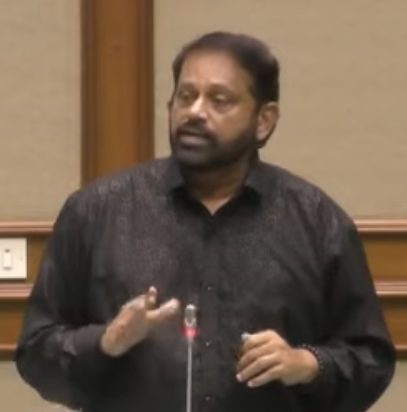
- Fernandes in 2024

Member of Goa Legislative Assembly
- Incumbent
- Assumed office 10 March 2022
- Preceded by: Antonio Fernandes
- Constituency: St. Cruz

Personal details
- Party: Bhartiya Janta Party (2022–present)
- Other political affiliations: Indian National Congress (2022)
- Parent: Victoria Fernandes (mother)
- Occupation: Politician

Rodolfo Louis "Rudolf" Fernandes is an Indian gangster-turned-politician who has served as a member of the Goa Legislative Assembly, representing the St. Cruz Assembly constituency since 2022. He began his political career in 2012 as an independent and subsequently joined the Indian National Congress (INC) in 2022. He defected to the Bharatiya Janata Party in the same year.

Fernandes first came to the limelight as a gangster and gang leader who operated in Santa Cruz, Goa, during the 1980s and 1990s.

== Political career ==
In 2012, Fernandes initially ran as an independent, contesting the St. Cruz Assembly constituency, previously represented by his mother Victoria Fernandes. He lost to Atanasio Monserrate of INC by a margin of 2336 votes which was 10.93% of the total votes polled. Monserrate was barred from Indian National Congress for anti-party activities in 2015.

In 2017, Fernandes ran for a second time again as an Independent and lost to Antonio Fernandes of INC, in a field of eight candidates. Hemant Golatkar and Fernandes, procured 5560 and 5262 votes respectively of the 22,215 total votes.

In 2022, Fernandes, ran for the third time as Indian National Congress candidate. He switched to BJP the same year.

== Personal life ==
Rodolfo Louis Fernandes was born to Andre Francisco Xavier Romao Franandes and Victoria Fernandes, in Santa Cruz, Goa. He completed his SSC from Santa Cruz High School and went on to complete his HSC from Dhempe College of Art and Science, Miramar, Goa. He is married and has three children. He hails from a Roman Catholic family.
