= Jennifer Monserrate =

Indian politician (1970–2026)

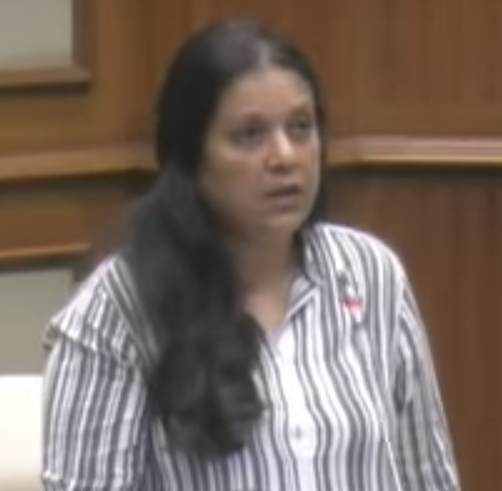
- Monserrate in 2024

Member of Goa Legislative Assembly
- In office 2012 – 19 July 2026
- Preceded by: Atanasio Monserrate
- Constituency: Taleigao

Personal details
- Born: Jennifer Monserrate; 24 March 1970 Santacruz, Bombay, Maharashtra, India
- Died: 19 July 2026 (aged 56) Goa, India
- Party: Bharatiya Janata Party (from 2019)
- Other political affiliations: United Goans Democratic Party (2007); Indian National Congress (2012–2019)
- Spouse: Babush Monserrate
- Occupation: Politician

Jennifer Monserrate (24 March 1970 – 19 July 2026) was an Indian politician and social worker who was a three-term member of the Goa Legislative Assembly, representing the Taleigao constituency from 2012. In July 2019, she was appointed a Cabinet Minister for Revenue, IT, Labour and Employment under Chief Minister Pramod Sawant.

Monserrate succeeded Rohan Khaunte who was earlier the Minister of Revenue and IT. She was the only woman minister in Pramod Sawant's cabinet as well as the first woman MLA to be elected from Taleigao constituency. She was one of the ten members of Indian National Congress who joined Bharatiya Janata Party in July 2019.

== Personal life ==
Jennifer Monserrate was born in Santacruz, Bombay on 24 March 1970.

She was married to politician and three term Member of the Goa Legislative Assembly Babush Monserrate. From 2012, Babush and Jennifer were recognised as the first spousal couple in the assembly.

Monserrate died on 19 July 2026, at the age of 56 after a prolonged illness.

== Committees ==
- Public Accounts Committee member since 8 August 2012.
- Committee on Petitions member since 8 August 2012.
