= Taleigao Assembly constituency =

Legislative Assembly constituency in Goa State, India

Coordinates: 15.47°N 73.82°E

Taleigao
- Constituency No. 12 for the Goa Legislative Assembly

Constituency details
- Country: India
- Region: Western India
- State: Goa
- District: North Goa
- Lok Sabha constituency: North Goa
- Established: 1989
- Total electors: 30,023
- Reservation: None

Member of Legislative Assembly
- 8th Goa Legislative Assembly
- Incumbent Vacant

Taleigao Assembly constituency is one of the 40 Goa Legislative Assembly constituencies of the state of Goa in southern India. Taleigao is also one of the 20 constituencies falling under North Goa Lok Sabha constituency.

== Members of Legislative Assembly ==
Year	Member	Party
1989	Vinay Singh	Indian National Congress
1994	Vinay Singh	Indian National Congress
1999	Vinay Singh	Indian National Congress
2002	Vinay Singh	United Goans Democratic Party
2007	Vinay Singh	United Goans Democratic Party
2012	Jennifer Monserrate	Indian National Congress
2017	Jennifer Monserrate	Indian National Congress
2022	Sakib Petal	Bharatiya Janata Party

== Election results ==
=== 2027 Assembly election ===
2027 Goa Legislative Assembly election: Taleigao
Party	Candidate	Votes	%	±%
INC				
NDA				
NOTA	None of the above			
Majority				
Turnout				
gain from		Swing		

=== Assembly Election 2022 ===
2022 Goa Legislative Assembly election : Taleigao
Party	Candidate	Votes	%	±%
BJP	Sakib Petal	10,167	43.38%	▲4.91
INC	Tony Alfredo Rodrigues	8,126	34.67%	▼16.46
AAP	Cecille Rodrigues	2,607	11.12%	▲2.36
RGP	Joseph Licio Roncon	1,651	7.05%	New
NOTA	None of the Above	421	1.80%	▲0.68
Independent	Adv. Pundalik Namdeo Raiker	289	1.23%	New
Margin of victory		2,041	8.71%	▼3.95
Turnout		23,435	78.06%	▼2.89
Registered electors		30,022		▲7.74
BJP gain from INC		Swing	▼7.75	

=== Assembly Election 2017 ===
2017 Goa Legislative Assembly election : Taleigao
Party	Candidate	Votes	%	±%
INC	Jennifer Monserrate	11,534	51.13%	▲0.36
BJP	Dattaprasad Naik	8,679	38.48%	▼6.83
AAP	Cecille Rodrigues	1,976	8.76%	New
NOTA	None of the Above	252	1.12%	New
Margin of victory		2,855	12.66%	▲7.19
Turnout		22,556	80.95%	▼0.22
Registered electors		27,864		▲7.52
INC hold		Swing	▲0.36	

=== Assembly Election 2012 ===
2012 Goa Legislative Assembly election : Taleigao
Party	Candidate	Votes	%	±%
INC	Jennifer Monserrate	10,682	50.78%	New
BJP	Dattaprasad Naik	9,531	45.31%	▲16.35
Goa Su-Raj Party	Annabelle Maria Pereira	333	1.58%	New
Samajwadi Janata Party (ChandraShekhar)	Natty Po	226	1.07%	New
Independent	Vasudev Narayan Sharma	143	0.68%	New
Margin of victory		1,151	5.47%	▼15.26
Turnout		21,036	81.02%	▲14.24
Registered electors		25,916		▼10.61
INC gain from UGDP		Swing	▲1.09	

=== Assembly Election 2007 ===
2007 Goa Legislative Assembly election : Taleigao
Party	Candidate	Votes	%	±%
UGDP	Atanasio Monserrate	9,641	49.69%	New
BJP	Silveira Agnelo Mariano	5,619	28.96%	▼2.00
Independent	Somnath Dattta Zuwarkar	3,833	19.75%	New
Independent	Kalangutkar Sudesh Raghuvir	135	0.70%	New
Margin of victory		4,022	20.73%	▼14.79
Turnout		19,404	66.82%	▲2.62
Registered electors		28,993		▲6.32
UGDP gain from INC		Swing	▼16.79	

=== Assembly By-election 2005 ===
2005 Goa Legislative Assembly by-election : Taleigao
Party	Candidate	Votes	%	±%
INC	Atanasio Monserrate	11,657	66.47%	▲37.41
BJP	Pradeep Nagvenkar	5,429	30.96%	▲6.00
Goa Su-Raj Party	Floriano Lobo	207	1.18%	New
Independent	Patel Rajendra Prasad	133	0.76%	New
Margin of victory		6,228	35.52%	▲22.31
Turnout		17,536	64.28%	▼2.83
Registered electors		27,270		▲6.95
INC gain from UGDP		Swing	▲24.20	

=== Assembly Election 2002 ===
2002 Goa Legislative Assembly election : Taleigao
Party	Candidate	Votes	%	±%
UGDP	Atanasio Monserrate	7,237	42.28%	New
INC	Zuwarkar Somnath Datta	4,976	29.07%	▼23.58
BJP	Tony Rodrigues	4,272	24.96%	New
NCP	Fernandes Lawrence Jack	398	2.33%	New
Independent	Vijay Anand Palekar	164	0.96%	New
Margin of victory		2,261	13.21%	▲1.60
Turnout		17,118	67.07%	▲6.70
Registered electors		25,499		▼2.12
UGDP gain from INC		Swing	▼10.37	

=== Assembly Election 1999 ===
1999 Goa Legislative Assembly election : Taleigao
Party	Candidate	Votes	%	±%
INC	Somnath Dattta Zuwarkar	8,288	52.65%	▲5.36
BJP	Salkar Subhash Tukaram	6,461	41.04%	New
MGP	Veluskar Ranganath Vassudev	515	3.27%	New
Independent	Joaquim Jorge Fernandes	460	2.92%	New
Margin of victory		1,827	11.61%	▲11.08
Turnout		15,742	60.36%	▼5.49
Registered electors		26,051		▲24.65
INC hold		Swing	▲5.36	

=== Assembly Election 1994 ===
1994 Goa Legislative Assembly election : Taleigao
Party	Candidate	Votes	%	±%
INC	Somnath Dattta Zuwarkar	6,514	47.29%	▲3.94
MGP	Fernandes Nicholas Pedro	6,442	46.76%	New
Gomantak Lok Pox	Saldanha Matanhy Jose	363	2.64%	New
BSP	Moraskar Sanjay Gajanan	163	1.18%	New
Margin of victory		72	0.52%	▼11.35
Turnout		13,776	64.71%	▼2.10
Registered electors		20,900		▲22.39
INC hold		Swing	▲3.94	

=== Assembly Election 1989 ===
1989 Goa Legislative Assembly election : Taleigao
Party	Candidate	Votes	%	±%
INC	Somnath Dattta Zuwarkar	5,034	43.34%	New
MGP	Ramesh Raghuvir Silimkhan	3,655	31.47%	New
Gomantak Lok Pox	Matanhy Jose Saldanha	1,595	13.73%	New
JD	Guru Inacio Shirodkar	577	4.19%	New
Independent	Dionisio Augutinho Trindade	169	1.23%	New
Independent	Minguel Jose Martins	93	0.68%	New
Independent	Sayed Dawood Yacub	75	0.54%	New
Margin of victory		1,379	11.87%	
Turnout		11,615	66.22%	
Registered electors		17,077		
INC win (new seat)				

== See also ==
- List of constituencies of the Goa Legislative Assembly
- North Goa district
