= Babush Monserrate =

Indian politician (born 1962)

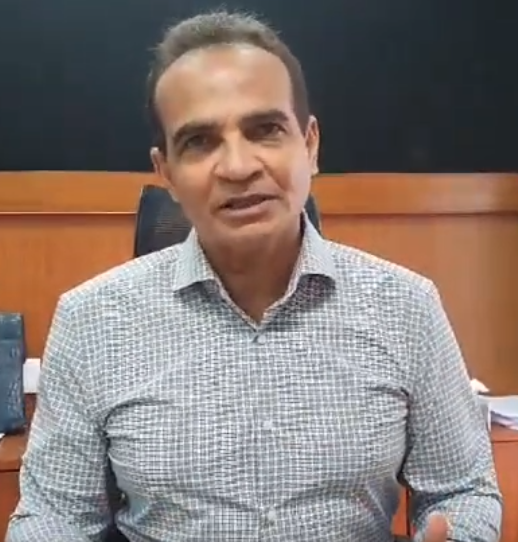
- Monserrate in 2023

Minister of Revenue Labour Waste Management
- Incumbent
- Assumed office March 2022

Member of Goa Legislative Assembly
- Incumbent
- Assumed office 2019
- Preceded by: Manohar Parrikar
- Constituency: Panaji

Member of Goa Legislative Assembly
- In office 2012–2017
- Preceded by: Victoria Fernandes
- Succeeded by: Antonio Fernandes
- Constituency: St. Cruz

Member of Goa Legislative Assembly
- In office 2002–2012
- Preceded by: Somnath Zuwarkar
- Succeeded by: Jennifer Monserrate
- Constituency: Taleigao

Personal details
- Born: Atanasio Monserrate; 20 December 1962 (age 63)
- Party: Bharatiya Janata Party (2004–2005, since 2019)
- Other political affiliations: United Goans Democratic Party (2002–2004); Indian National Congress (2005–2015, 2019–2019); United Goans Party (2017–2017); Goa Forward Party (2017–2019)
- Spouse: Jennifer Monserrate
- Children: 2
- Nickname: Babush

Atanasio "Babush" Monserrate (born 20 December 1962) is an Indian politician and social worker who is a four-term member of the Goa Legislative Assembly. He is a current member of the Goa Legislative Assembly from Panaji Assembly constituency. He was the Member of Legislative Assembly for Taleigao. He was married to Jennifer Monserrate, Member of Legislative Assembly, Taleigao.

He was one of the ten members of Indian National Congress who joined Bharatiya Janata Party in July 2019.

== Personal life ==
Monserrate was married to fellow legislator Jennifer Monserrate, who served as a MLA from Taleigao constituency until her death in July 2026. Together they have two sons, Amit and, Rohit who is a five-time Mayor of Panjim.

== Political career ==
Babush contested his first election in 2002 on a United Goans Democratic Party ticket from the Taleigao Vidhan Sabha constituency. His opponent was two-term sitting member of the Assembly Somnath Datta Zuwarkar from the Indian National Congress. Monserrate defeated Zuwarkar by about two thousand votes and was elected for the very first time to the Goa assembly.

Babush was made a Minister of Town and Country Planning in the Manohar Parrikar led Government. In 2005, he and two other ministers resigned from the Manohar Parrikar led Government leaving it in a minority and thus bringing down the Bharatiya Janata Party Government of Goa.

In the coming by-election, Babush switched sides and fought the election on an Indian National Congress ticket and won the election by defeating Silveira Agnelo Mariano of the Bharatiya Janata Party by about four thousand votes. He was made a minister in the Congress government under Chief Minister Pratapsingh Rane. In the 2007 assembly elections, Monserrate was pitted against Silveira Agnelo Marian of the Bharatiya Janata Party.

Babush won that election by about two thousand votes and was appointed the Education minister of the state under Chief Minister Digambar Kamat. In the 2012, assembly election he vacated his safe seat of Taleigao for his wife Jennifer Monserrate and contested from the Santa Cruz constituency. Monserrate won that election on a Congress ticket defeating Rodolfo Louis Fernandes by about two thousand three hundred votes.

In that same election, Monserrate's wife Jennifer Monserrate also won her election from the Taleigao Vidhan Sabha constituency thus making history of sorts by having a wife and husband to be elected to the Goa Assembly. He was expelled from the Indian National Congress in 2015 for six years for "anti-party activities".

Monserrate contested the 2017 election from the Panaji (Vidhan Sabha constituency) and lost to Sidharth Sripad Kuncalienker of the Bharatiya Janata Party by about a thousand votes.

In July 2017 Monserrate joined the Goa Forward Party.

He contested the 2019 bypoll from Panaji Assembly constituency and won. He joined the Bharatiya Janata Party soon after his win.

He was re-elected in 2022 Goa Legislative Assembly election as a Bharatiya Janata Party candidate defeating Independent candidate and son of Former CM Manohar Parrikar, Utpal Parrikar by over 700 votes.

== Rape allegations ==
In May 2016, Goa Police arrested Monserrate for rape of a minor from Nepal.
