= Victoria Fernandes =

Indian politician (1934–2019)

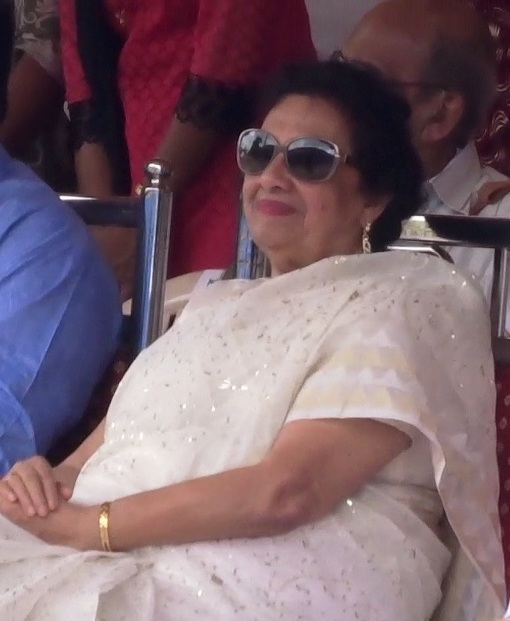
- Fernandes in 2015

Member of Goa Legislative Assembly
- In office 1994–2012
- Preceded by: Victor Gonsalves
- Succeeded by: Babush Monserrate
- Constituency: St. Cruz

Deputy Speaker of Goa Legislative Assembly
- In office 2005–2007
- Appointed by: Pratapsingh Rane

Personal details
- Born: 26 July 1934 Curtorim, Portuguese Goa
- Died: 7 September 2019 (aged 85)
- Resting place: Holy Cross Church, Santa Cruz, Goa
- Party: Indian National Congress (1999–2012)
- Other political affiliations: Janata Party (1984); Gomantak Lok Pox (c. 1989)
- Spouse: Romeo (m. 1954)
- Children: 8, including Rodolfo Fernandes
- Nickname: Mummy

Victoria Fernandes (26 July 1934 – 7 September 2019), also known as Mummy, was an Indian politician who represented the St. Cruz Assembly constituency for four terms.

== Early and personal life ==
Victoria Fernandes was born in Curtorim on 26 July 1934 and had an identical twin sister. Her parents considered their birth as a blessing by Saint Anne, whose feast is celebrated around that day. Her father was a range forest officer. She spent most of her childhood in Belgaum. Her journeys with her father in the jungles of North Canara, during which she saw the poor condition of the tribals there, inspired her to serve people.

Fernandes grew up getting inspired by the stories of Saint Maria Goretti, Joan of Arc, Rani of Jhansi and Florence Nightingale. She initially decided to be a nun. She then decided to be a nurse and even passed the examination, when her marriage was fixed.

At the age of 20, she married Romeo. She made sure that the marriage was on her terms, allowing no discussions about caste, creed or dowry. She later credited her husband with being supportive of her social and political work. They returned to Goa just before the liberation of Goa in 1961.

Fernandes loved theatre and, despite her mother-in-law's objections and her own busy lifestyle, acted in a few plays. She would act in plays during the Legislators' Day celebrations. She made a cameo appearance in the film, Goonj.

Politician Rodolfo Fernandes is her son. She had two sons and six daughters.

== Social work ==
=== Opinion Poll ===
In 1966, during the proposed merger of Goa with Maharashtra, Fernandes helped convince many, including people who supported the merger, to protect Goa's identity and independence by opposing the merger. She was part of a team that was led by Jack de Sequeira.

While she was initially tasked with mobilising the people of South Goa due to the majority of its population being Catholic, she chose to work in North Goa. She wore a Maharashtrian sari and played Marathi music on loudspeakers to attract people's attention. When they found out that she was against the merger, they attempted to physically assault her. When she told them that she was not afraid, they realised that she only had the concern for Goa.

When the Council of Action was formed as a non-party organisation meant to oppose the merger and overthrow the ruling Maharashtrawadi Gomantak Party government, Fernandes led a few hundred people at a protest at Azad Maidan, Panaji, after which she was arrested.

On the day of the Goa Opinion Poll, 16 January 1967, she went on a door-to-door campaign to request people to vote to preserve Goa's identity and oppose the merger.

=== Ramponnkar movement ===
In 1978–79, she was part of the Ramponnkar movement alongside Matanhy Saldanha, supporting traditional fishermen whose livelihood was threatened by mechanised fishing that was encouraged by Shashikala Kakodkar's government.

=== Other work ===
Fernandes started a Pragati Mahila Mandal (transl. group for women's progress) in Santa Cruz, Goa.

Fernandes supported multiple movements, such as the toddy tappers' movement. She also formed the all Goa vendors association and worked with the Red Cross and associations of nurses. She also helped set up NGOs, mahila mandals (women groups) and anganwadis across Goa. She also supported the Konkani language agitation in the mid-1980s.

== Political career ==
Fernandes contested elections and lost twice, first representing the Janata Party in 1984 and later the Gomantak Lok Pox. She later represented the St. Cruz Assembly constituency for four terms. This was between 1994 and 2012, with her initial win as an independent candidate and later representing the Indian National Congress in 1999, 2002 and 2007.

She held ministerial posts in the departments of agriculture, tourism, fisheries, women and child development. This was during the governments of Luizinho Faleiro in 1998-99 and Francisco Sardinha in 1999–2000. She also served as a parliamentary secretary and was part of various House committees.

Fernandes is regarded as the first politician in Goa to have won an assembly election as an independent candidate. She is also regarded as the first Goan to be arrested under the National Security Act, following which she was imprisoned for three months at Aguada jail in 1994.

When Pratapsingh Rane was the Chief Minister, Fernandes was elected as the Deputy Speaker of the Assembly between 2005 and 2007.

In 2007, she briefly revolted against the Congress Party in Goa for not giving her a position in the cabinet of ministers despite her being the only elected female Member of Legislative Assembly. She then failed to overthrow the government, led by Digambar Kamat, by partnering with Manohar Parrikar, the leader of the Opposition.

Later, in 2012, the Congress party refused to give her son, Rodolfo Fernandes, the Congress party ticket, instead offering it to her political rival, Babush Monserrate. Due to age-related reasons, she then fielded Rodolfo as an Independent candidate. However, Monserrate won the elections.

She was part of the forum of ex-legislators and serving law-makers, who meet once a year to celebrate Legislators' Day. Fernandes would act in plays during these celebrations.

She was also the chairperson of the Kadamba Transport Corporation and the Goa Amateur Boxing Association.

== Death ==
Fernandes died on 7 September 2019 after a prolonged illness. Her funeral was held on 9 September at the Holy Cross Church, Santa Cruz.

== Legacy ==
Writer Dilip Borkar published a book about her, titled, Flower of Fire, which was released on the occasion of her birthday. The poet Manohar Rai Sardesai wrote about her:

O Victoria The Beautiful,
O Victoria The Bold,
Never Grow Old,
We Need the Sword,
And We Need the Spade,
You are a Flower of Fire,
That will Never Fade.
