= Dempo =

Indian mining company

- Type: Private
- Industry: Conglomerate
- Founded: 1941; 85 years ago
- Headquarters: Panaji, Goa, India

Dempo is a company from Goa, India. It was founded as a mining business in 1941 by brothers Vasantrao S. Dempo in and Vaikuntrao Dempo. In 2011 its mining business was sold to Vedanta Limited.

Dempo established Hindustan Foods in 1988 as a joint venture with Glaxo to manufacture cereal-based food products. Dempo also operates businesses in travel agency, newspaper publishing, shipbuilding, refining, and real estate.

Dempo also established the charitable Voicuntrao Dempo Centre for Indo-Portuguese Studies (Portuguese: Centro de Estudos Indo-Portugueses Voicuntrao Dempo).
