= Merces, Goa =

Mercês Morambi-o-Grande
- Neighborhood
- Location within Goa Location within India
- Coordinates: 15°29′09.7″N 73°51′18.6″E
- Country: India
- State: Goa
- District: North Goa
- Taluka: Ilhas

Government
  - Type: Panchayat
- Elevation: 8 m (26 ft)

Population (2011)
  - Total: 1,523
- Time zone: UTC+5:30 (IST)
- Postcode: 403005
- Telephone code: 0832

Mercês is a neighborhood located in the northeastern part of the city of Panaji, capital of the Indian state of Goa. It is completely located on the island of Tiswadi, one of the talukas in the state of Goa. It is located between the Mandovi River and the Bambolim neighborhood. The neighborhood of Mercês is well connected with various tourist destinations such as Bambolim, Panjim, Miramar and Caranzalem. It is well known among the people of Goa due to a famous wedding venue situated here known as Alua Mercês. Its school is Our Lady of Mercês High School. For accommodations there are a number of houses and villas to rent. One can also get bikes for hire to visit nearby places.

The neighborhood of Mercês is politically connected with the adjoining neighborhood of Santa Cruz, which share an MLA.
