= Siridao =

Siridao Siridão (Konkani)
- Village
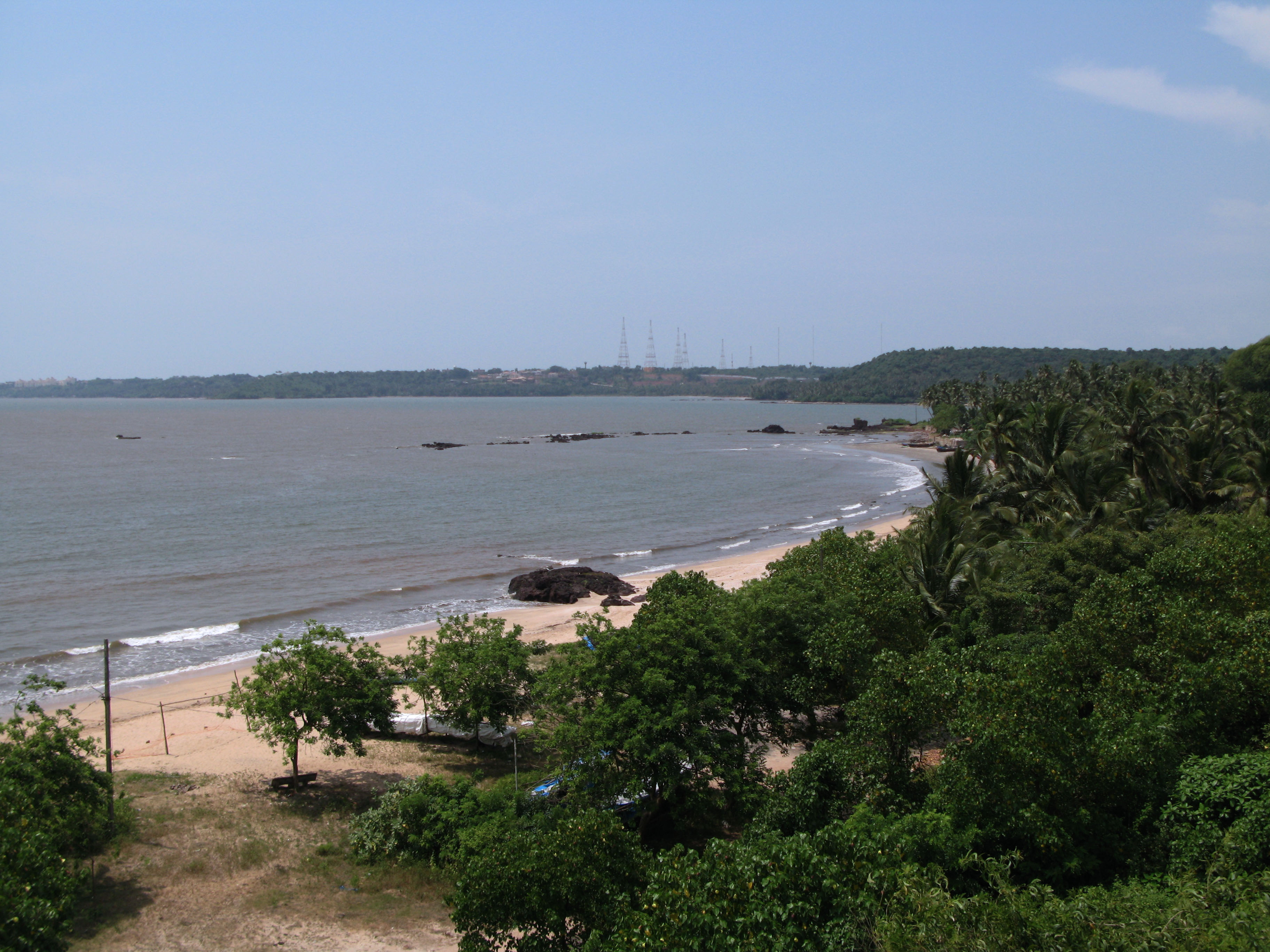
- Interactive map of Siridao
- Coordinates: 15.4451°N 73.85497°E

Government
  - Body: Government of Goa
- Time zone: UTC+05:30 (IST)

Siridao, or Siridão, is a village located at the southern end of the city of Panaji, capital of the Indian state of Goa. It is completely located on the island of Tiswadi, one of the talukas in the state of Goa.

== Transportation ==
The neighborhood can be easily accessed using two wheelers and four wheelers. Public buses run through the NH-17 which acts as a barrier between Palem, other half of Siridão. One can drop off at the bus stand and walk as no buses run through the neighborhood.

== Population ==
In 2011, Siridão had 2,417 residents.
