= Gomantak Lok Pox =

Former political party of Goa

The Gomantak Lok Pox (GLP; in English: Goa People's Party; in Portuguese: Partido Popular de Goa) was a political party in the Indian state of Goa.

In the late 1970s, Mathany Saldanha established the "Gomantak Lok Pox" party.

In the state assembly elections 1999, Saldanha was the sole candidate of the party. He stood in the Cortalim constituency and got 1,728 votes (9.81%). In 2002, GLP merged with United Goans Democratic Party, and Saldanha became the general secretary of UGDP.
