= Goa University Library =

Coordinates: 15.45948°N 73.83018°E

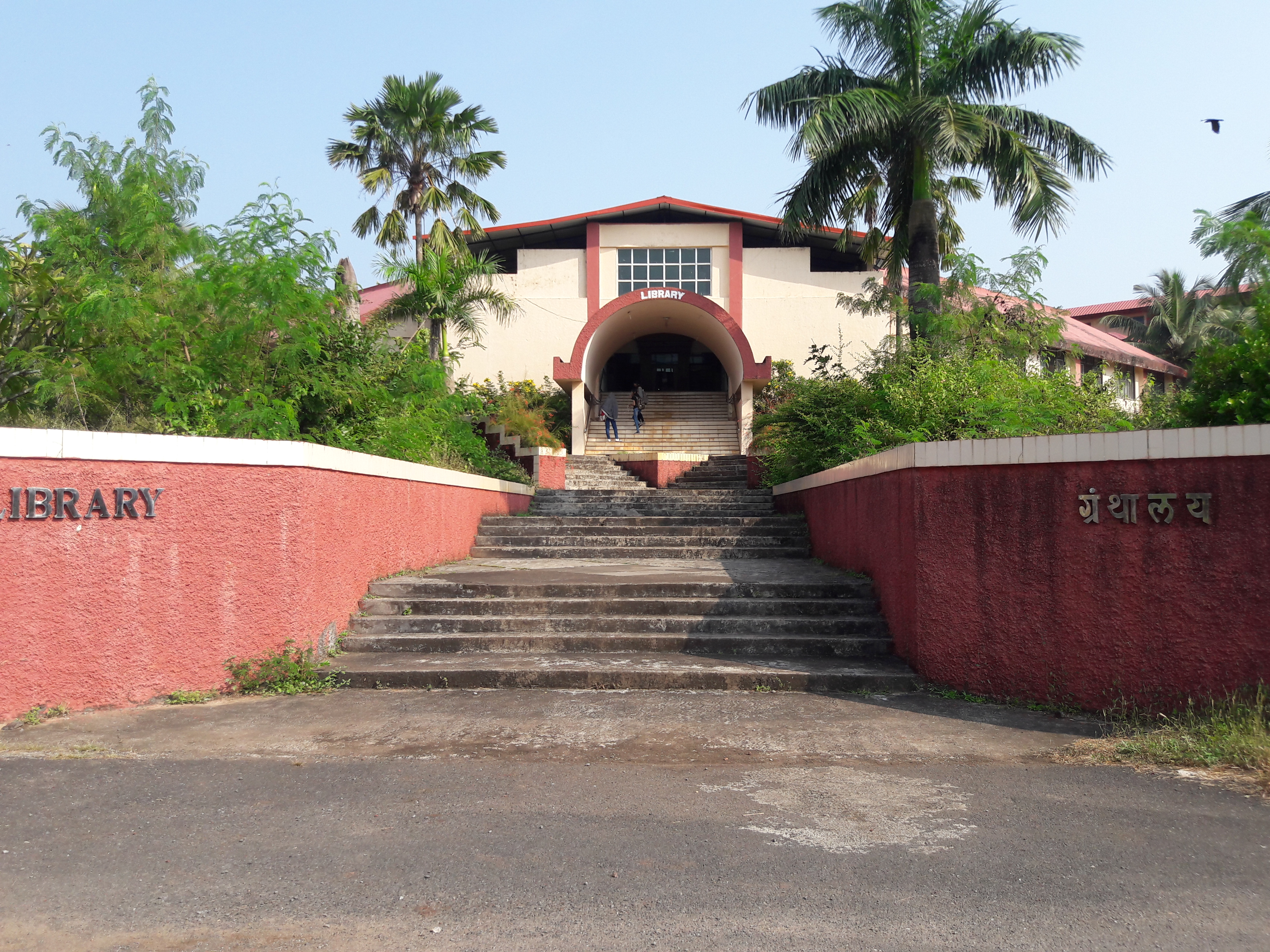
- Formation: 30 June 1985; 40 years ago
- Purpose: Educational
- Location: Goa, India
- Region served: International (Through OPAC)
- Official language: Multiple
- University Librarian: Sandesh B. Dessai
- Key people: Library Assistants
- Main organ: Assembly
- Parent organization: Goa University
- Website: www.unigoa.ac.in/facilities/library.html

Goa University Library is one of the major libraries in the state of Goa, India. It houses an estimated 140,000 books and 300 journals. It also is home to special interest collections and rare and antique manuscripts, according to its official website.

== History ==
The Goa University Library and Information Centre was set up on 30 June 1985 and was built on the existing library of the Centre for Post Graduate Research and Instruction, University of Bombay, which itself was the precursor to the Goa University.

At that time, the collection totalled 37,678 books and several bound volumes of periodicals.

It currently has books dealing with the Humanities, Social Science and Pure and Applied Sciences especially Microbiology, Marine Science, Environmental Science, Computer Science, Geology, Management and other disciplines including a special collection on Latin America and The Caribbean.

It is also known to have a significant collection of titles in Konkani, which is the regional language in Goa, and some in Portuguese, French and Spanish. Its official website says it "acquires around 3000 books and over 400 periodicals every year."

Goa University Library has been a designated Repository Library of United Nations publications since 1996.

Goa University launched an online public access catalog that allows people to look up titles of interest from the library website.

== Special collections ==
Among the special collections it is noted for are:

- About 5000 books, specially on Indo-Portuguese history and culture, donated by Pandurang Pissurlekar.
- The Nuno Gonsalves collection.
- The Dr. Carmo Azavedo Collection.

It has been computerising the database of bibliographic details, and automating library servies using the Free/Libre and Open Source Koha-based software.

== Additional details ==
On 12–13 December 2012, a WikiWorkshop was organised at the Goa University library to introduce students and a few faculty on how to edit the Wikipedia, from 2.30 pm to 4.30 pm.
