= Irene Barros =

Indian politician (1930–2021)

- Born: 12 November 1929; Cuncolim, Goa, Portuguese India,
- Died: 22 August 2021 (aged 91); Goa Medical College, Bambolim, Goa, India
- Burial place: Betalbatim, Goa, India
- Education: B.A.
- Occupation: Politician
- Known for: First woman sarpanch in Goa
- Title: President of Indian National Congress-Goa
- Term: 1980–1982
- Political party: Indian National Congress
- Movement: 1967 Goa status referendum
- Spouse: Leo Barros

Irene Lourenço e Barros was an Indian politician, Indian National Congress loyalist and pioneer for woman politicians from Goa. She was the first woman to be elected as a sarpanch of a village in the state of Goa, and the first and only woman to serve as president of the Indian National Congress-Goa. According to the Congress party she was probably the first female sarpanch in India.

== Personal life ==
Born Maria Irene Lourenço, in 1930, to the Lourenço family of Bhiunsa-Cuncolim in the erstwhile Portuguese Goa, she was the niece of Monsignor. Padre Agapito Lourenço, a prominent clergyman and educationalist, instrumental in setting up educational institutes in Cuncolim. She went on to study and complete her Bachelor of Arts undergraduate degree and after completion would marry into the Barros (a.k.a. de Barros) family of Betalbatim, originally the Barros family of Cansaulim as one branch moved to Betalbatim in the 18th century. Her husband was Dr. Leo Mackenson Barros, a medical doctor and the younger brother of Prof. José Simião Francisco Regis Barros who was born in Mombasa. Both were sons of Sr. Antonio Pedro Barros and Da. Maria Leticia Viegas (Assolnã).

== Political career ==
Her husband Leo was a well known medical practitioner in his hometown as well the surrounding villages, hence Barros was already popular, and was known to help her neighborhood as many village locals were not educated at that time. With the invasion and annexation of Goa by India in December 1961, the panchayati raj system and elections were set up in Goa, and Barros decided to actively enter politics despite facing objections from friends as it was considered unbefitting for a woman to be involved in politics. She stood in Goa's first ever panchayat elections and proved to be a popular candidate.

Barros was unanimously chosen to head the council and was declared Sarpanch, making her the 1st woman in Goa and possibly one such of India to hold a post of that rank. She is known to have even allowed the use of the anti-hall of the Barros manor as the makeshift office and village hall during the early years while the Barros family and other prominent townsfolk personally contributed to construct a building for the local government. She would go on to serve 3 terms (15years) as sarpanch and would often rely on her new family personal wealth to finance the development of the village. She strongly supported the United Goans Party candidate in the Goa's 1st state legislative assembly, her brother-in-law, Prof. José Barros's wife Dª.Filomena Rosita Antónia Inês Rodrigues first cousin, Dr.Maurillo Furtado from Varcá was one of the main leaders of the united Goans, who became the 1st MLA of Benaulim (Goa Assembly constituency). Her support for the party would come again, when she strongly voiced her support for the Goa Opinion Poll to be held, and strongly opposed the introduction of liquor laws by the MGP Party, stating that the culture of Goa that accepts women can drink was progressive (which was considered taboo in the rest of India). After the success of the opinion poll in saving Goa's future, Barros worked for the strengthening of an almost nonexistent presence of the Indian National Congress, and became closely associated with then prime minister Indira Gandhi who appreciated her as a strong woman candidate. Barros played a major role in bringing INC into power for the 1st time, which would remain in uninterrupted power for 15 years until internal split in the party. With Congress forming the government in 1980, Barros was soon nominated as president of Goa Pradesh Congress Committee, with Pratapsingh Rane as Chief Minister of Goa. With the fall of Shashikala Kakodkar, and simultaneous governments in the Lok sabha and Goa for the 1st time, many referred to Barros during her tenure as 'The most powerful woman in Goa'. Citing her inability to control infighting amongst the congress MLAs as well as her loss of local popularity and support, Barros was relieved of her post in 1982 by Sulochana Katkar.

== Post-politics and death ==
After being relieved as president, she served as Chairman of Goa Provedoria (Institute of Public Assistance) briefly. Much before her retirement much of the Barros family's wealth had been spent with her support for development and the fight over Goa Opinion Poll, including her brother-in-law Prof. Jose Barros whose small time iron ore business was taken over by Chowgule Group in financial support of his cousin Dr. Maurillo Furtardo, who himself was forced to sell his successful medical clinic in Karachi, to garner support against the Goa merger with Maharashtra, prompting him to refer to his comrades and himself as Martyr Politicians.

After her retirement she was often asked to head and speak in multiple women empowerment groups all over Goa well into her old age. She began to shy away from public life after she lost 2 of her daughters to breast cancer. She was diagnosed with COVID-19 in April 2020 and was admitted at Goa Medical College, but made a recovery and was discharged, but a while later, was admitted once again due to her deteriorating condition. She was shifted to the GMC ICU where special attention was given to her on request of the health minister Vishwajit Rane, son of her colleague Pratapsingh Rane. She died on 22 August 2021, due to post-COVID complications of acute kidney failure and electrolyte imbalance. Barros has been cited as an inspiration for all Goan women by GPCC.
