= Jit Arolkar =

Indian politician

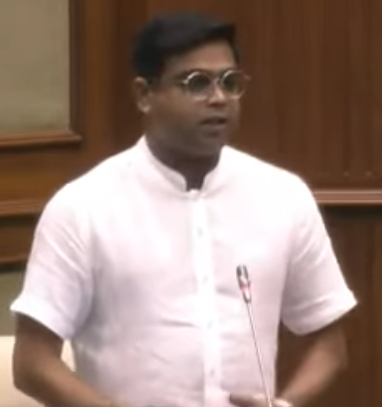
- Arolkar in 2024

Member of Goa Legislative Assembly
- Incumbent
- Assumed office 10 March 2022
- Preceded by: Dayanand Sopte
- Constituency: Mandrem

Personal details
- Born: Jit Vinayak Arolkar
- Party: Maharashtrawadi Gomantak Party
- Education: 10th Pass
- Alma mater: Manguirish Vidyalaya English High School
- Profession: Business

Jit Vinayak Arolkar is an Indian politician from Goa and a member of the Goa Legislative Assembly. Arolkar won the Mandrem Assembly constituency on the Maharashtrawadi Gomantak Party ticket in the 2022 Goa Legislative Assembly election. He defeated Dayanand Sopte of Bharatiya Janata Party by 715 votes.
