= Phyllis Faria =

Indian politician (1924–2018)

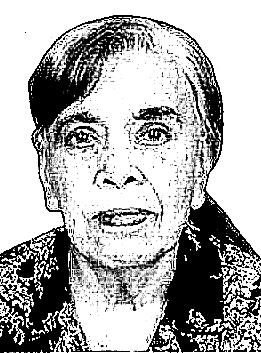
- Photo-sketch of Faria

Nominated MLA, Goa Legislative Assembly
- In office January 1985 – November 1989

President, Mapusa Municipal Council
- In office 1 December 1973 – 13 December 1974
- Preceded by: J. B. Clement D'Souza
- Succeeded by: Shyamsunder Neogi

Personal details
- Born: 17 April 1924
- Died: 22 February 2018 (aged 93)
- Spouse: Antonio Vasco de Faria
- Occupation: Politician
- Awards: Yashadamini Puraskar

Phyllis Yolanda Virginia Faria (née de Souza; 17 April 1924 – 22 February 2018) was an Indian politician and nominated MLA of the Goa Legislative Assembly. She also served as the President of the Mapusa Municipal Council.

== Personal life ==
Phyllis Faria was born as Phyllis Yolanda Virginia de Souza in a family of educationists on 17 April 1924 to Alphonsus Ligouri de Souza and Elsie Beatrice. Phyllis became a teacher and taught for over 25 years. She was married to Antonio Vasco de Faria.

== Political career ==
In 1966, Faria was appointed as the Chairperson of the Project Implementation Committee, Bardez. In 1970, she was elected as a Councillor of the Mapusa Municipal Council and in 1973 became the first woman President of the Council.

In January 1985, Faria along with Sulochana Katkar and Sangeeta Parab was nominated as a member of the Goa Legislative Assembly. During her tenure as a nominated MLA of the Goa Legislative Assembly, she served as a member of the Library Committee and the Committee on Privileges of the Goa Legislative Assembly.

She was also the President of the North Goa Mahila Congress. In 1990, Faria became the first woman Chairperson of the Goa Handicrafts Rural & Small Scale Industries Development Corporation (GHRSSIDC). She served as the Chairperson of the Juvenile Welfare Board. Faria was the Vice Chairperson of the Sanjay Centre For Special Education and as a Director of the Goa Bal Bhavan. She also chaired the Managing Committee of the Sacred Heart School at Parra, Goa.

== Awards ==
She was honoured with the Yashadamini Puraskar by the Government of Goa in 2002. Faria was felicitated on 9 January 2014 at the valedictory ceremony to mark the Golden Jubilee celebrations of the Goa Legislative Assembly.

== Death ==
Faria died at the Goa Medical College on 22 February 2018 after a brief illness.
