= Laxmikant Parsekar =

Indian politician (born 1956)

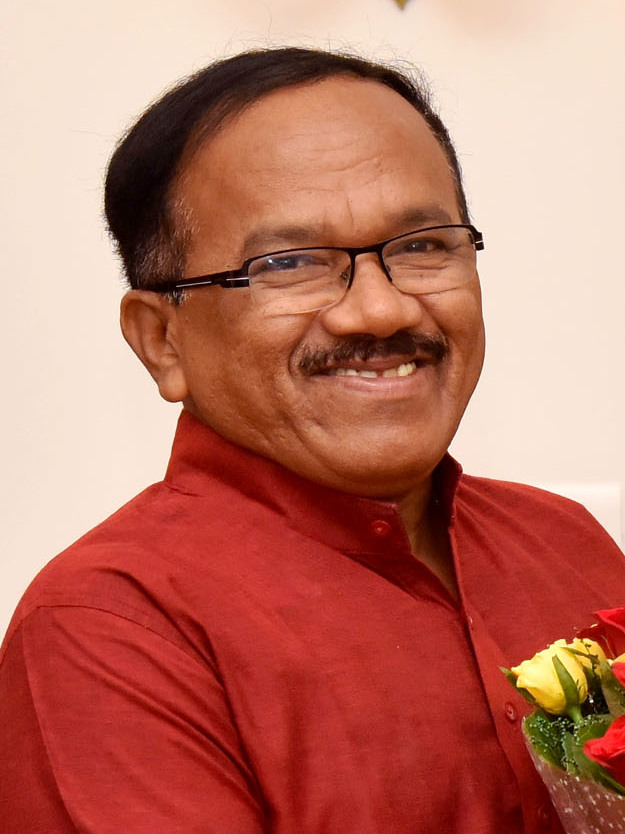
- Parsekar in 2016

10th Chief Minister of Goa
- In office 8 November 2014 – 14 March 2017
- Preceded by: Manohar Parrikar
- Succeeded by: Manohar Parrikar

Member of the Goa Legislative Assembly
- In office 2002–2017
- Preceded by: Ramakant Khalap
- Succeeded by: Dayanand Sopte
- Constituency: Mandrem

Personal details
- Born: Laxmikant Yashwant Parsekar; 4 July 1956 (age 70) Arambol, Goa, Portuguese India
- Party: Independent (2022–present); Bharatiya Janata Party (until 2022)
- Spouse: Smita
- Children: 2
- Education: Centre of Post Graduation Instruction & Research, Panaji, Goa, (then Bombay University)

Laxmikant Yashwant Parsekar (born 4 July 1956) is an Indian politician who served as the tenth Chief Minister of Goa from 2014 to 2017. He was the member of the Goa Legislative Assembly, representing the Mandrem constituency from 2002 to 2017. A former member of the Bharatiya Janata Party, he is currently an independent politician.

He was appointed the Chief Minister of Goa on 8 November 2014, replacing Manohar Parrikar. During the Goa Assembly Election in 2017, he lost from his seat of Mandrem. He resigned on 11 March 2017.

== Early life and education ==
Laxmikant Parsekar was born on 4 July 1956 in the village of Arambol, Portuguese Goa. He has completed his M.Sc (1980) and B.Ed (1981) from Centre of Post Graduate Instruction & Research, Panaji, Goa, (then Bombay University). He was the principal of Harmal Panchakroshi Secondary School, Harmal, Goa.

== Political career ==
He served as Goa's Minister of Health before becoming Chief Minister and has a strong connection to the Rashtriya Swayamsevak Sangh.

- In 1988, he contested and lost against sitting MLA and Maharashtrawadi Gomantak Party candidate Ramakant Khalap from Mandrem constituency, as a candidate of the BJP, then a virtual non-entity in Goa. He was instrumental in building the BJP's support base along with political veterans like Manohar Parrikar, Rajendra Arlekar and Shripad Naik, Union Minister of State for Health [AAYUSH Department].
- From 1994 to 1999, he served as a General Secretary of the Goa BJP
- In 1999, he contested and lost again to Ramakant Khalap, but in 2002, he defeated Khalap by a small margin of 750 votes.
- While he did not serve in the first BJP government in Goa, Parsekar served as the President of the BJP Goa Unit from 2000 to 2003 and then from 2010 to 2012.
- In 2007, he doubled his victory margin in the Mandrem seat.
- In 2012, he was re-elected when the BJP posted a remarkable victory, winning 21 out of 40 seats during the 2012 Goa Legislative Assembly election.
- After Chief Minister Manohar Parrikar joined Prime Minister Narendra Modi's cabinet as India's Defense Minister, Laxmikant Parsekar was sworn in as his replacement on 8 November 2014.
- In 2017, he lost the Mandrem assembly seat to Dayanand Sopte of the Indian National Congress. He resigned as Chief Minister on 11 March 2017. Later, Sopote joined BJP.
- In 2022, he resigned from BJP when the party decided to field Sopote from Mandrem seat for Goa Vidhan Sabha mid-term election. Parsekar contested as an independent and came third, but polled enough votes to ensure the defeat of BJP's Sopote.

Political offices
Preceded by Manohar Parrikar	Chief Minister of Goa; 8 November 2014 – 12 March 2017	Succeeded by Manohar Parrikar
