= Sangeeta Parab =

Indian politician

Nominated MLA, Goa Legislative Assembly
- In office January 1985 – November 1989

MLA, Goa Legislative Assembly
- In office 1994–1999
- Preceded by: Ramakant Khalap
- Succeeded by: Ramakant Khalap
- Constituency: Mandrem

Personal details
- Party: Indian National Congress
- Occupation: Politician

Sangeeta Gopal Parab is an Indian politician from Goa who has served as an MLA and as the state's Education Minister. She has been associated with the Indian National Congress (INC) and has also engaged with other political parties during her career.

== Early political career ==
In the 1980 and 1984 elections, the Goa, Daman and Diu Legislative Assembly did not have any elected female members. To address this, Chief Minister Pratapsingh Rane nominated Parab, along with Phyllis Faria and Sulochana Katkar, to the assembly for the term 1984–1989. This nomination was intended to ensure representation for women and other underrepresented groups.

Parab contested from the Mandrem Assembly constituency and won the 1994 assembly elections.

Parab held the position of Education Minister in the Goa government. She was a member of the INC during her tenure. In the early 2000s, she left the Congress and joined the Nationalist Congress Party (NCP) under the leadership of Wilfred de Souza. However, she did not maintain a long-term affiliation with the NCP and remained without any political association for several years.

Parab's political career has seen her contesting from the Mandrem Assembly constituency. In the 2002 assembly elections, she contested as a Congress candidate but was defeated by BJP's Laxmikant Parsekar. Her involvement in the constituency's political landscape has been marked by shifting party affiliations and strategic alliances.

== Later political career ==
In 2012, Parab supported the Bharatiya Janata Party (BJP) during the state assembly elections. She backed BJP candidate Laxmikant Parsekar in the Mandrem constituency, where he emerged victorious. This support was notable as the INC had allocated the ticket to BJP dissident Dayanand Sopte, leading to a multi-cornered contest.

Ahead of the 2017 assembly elections, Parab announced her decision to rejoin the INC. On 20 March 2016, she, along with her son Sachin Parab, a social worker active in the Mandrem constituency, were formally readmitted into the party. The induction ceremony took place in the Mandrem constituency, which was represented by Chief Minister Laxmikant Parsekar at the time. Upon rejoining, Parab expressed her commitment to the state's welfare and emphasized the importance of consolidating support for the Congress to establish a better government post the 2017 elections.
