= Anuradha Wagle =

Anuradha Wagle is a Head of French and Francophone Studies at Goa University. In 2016, she was awarded the Chevalier de l'Ordre des Arts et Lettres (The Knight of the Order of Arts and Letters) by the Government of France.
