= Jayanti Naik =

Indian writer and researcher (born 1962)

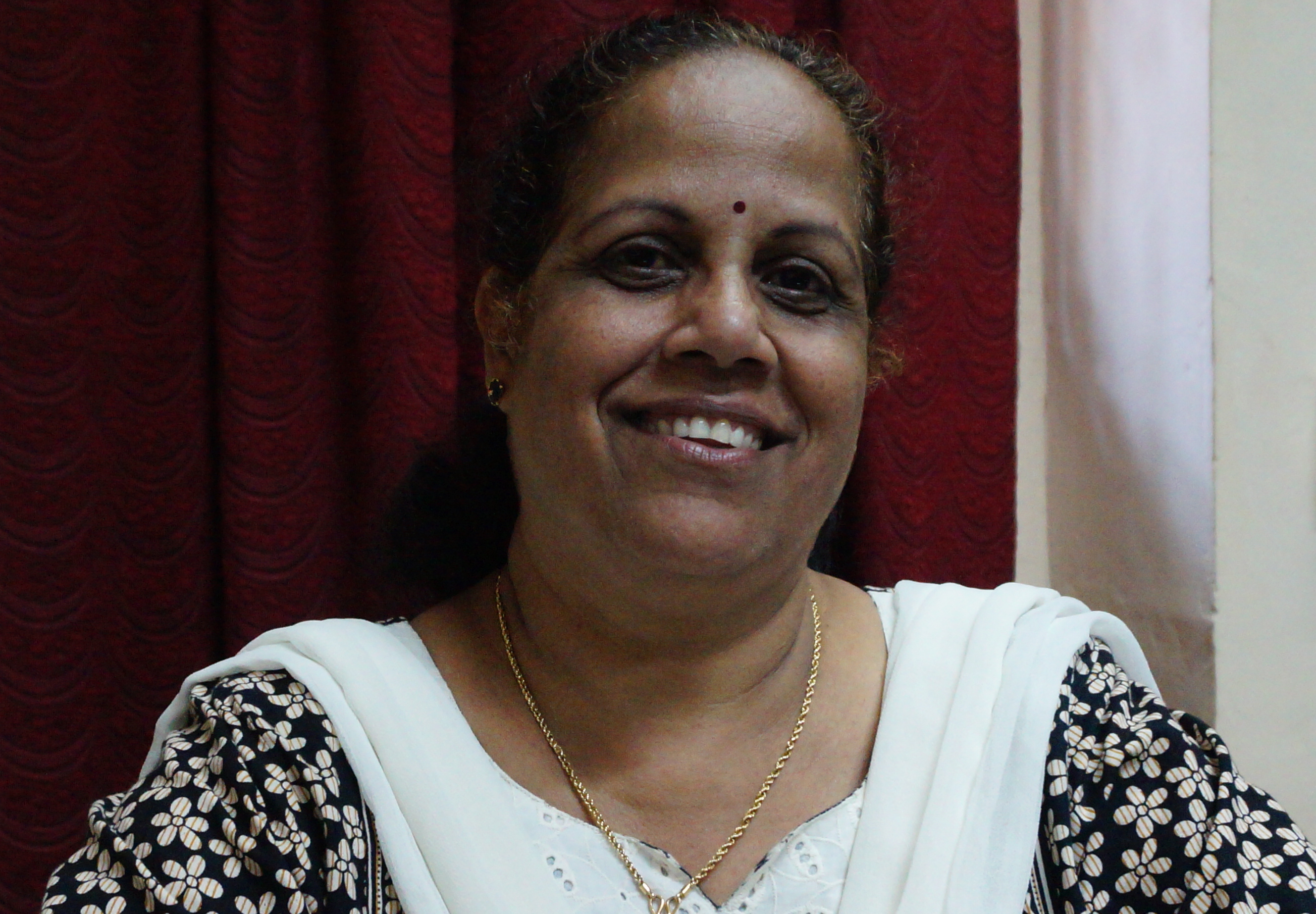
- Naik in 2015
- Born: 6 August 1962 (age 64); Quepem, Goa, India
- Education: P.G.Diploma in Folklore & M.A. (Soc.) Mysore University; Ph.D. (Konkani) Goa University
- Alma mater: Mysore University; Goa University
- Occupations: Writer; folklorist
- Writing career
- Language: Konkani
- Subjects: Folklore; Sociology; Konkani
- Notable works: Garjan; 'Athang; Konkani Lokved; Grajan; Nimnnem Bondd; Venchik Lok Kannio
- Notable awards: Sahitya Akademi Award
- Literary movement: Konkani Language Agitation

Jayanti Naik (born 6 August 1962) is an Indian Konkani writer, folklore researcher, short story writer, dramatist, children's writer, folklorist, and translator. She was the first person to earn a doctorate from the Goa University's Department of Konkani. Naik is also a recipient of the Sahitya Akademi Award. In her career of some three decades, she has produced on average, a book a year.

== Folklore and folk tales ==
Naik takes care of the folklore section of the Goa Konkani Akademi, the aim of which is to "conserve and preserve (the) rich folklore of Goa". Her work includes Ratha Tujeo Ghudio, Kanner Khunti Naari, Tlloi Ukhalli Kelliani, Manalim Gitam, Pednecho Dosro, and Lokbimb.

Naik has written 16 books on folklore. Her book on Konkani folklore, entitled Konkani Lokved, has several folk tales current among the Konkani-speaking emigrants who made their permanent home in the southern Indian States of Karnataka and Kerala in their original form with regional slant, as they were graphically recounted to her.

Naik's Amonnem Yek Lokjinn (Goa Konkani Akademi, 1993) focuses on the village of Amona and its surrounding regions. It covers its history religion, social practices, festivals and folklore, among other topics. In 2019 Rajaee Prakashan published 'Gutbandh' a collection of her articles on Goan folklore which had appeared in the Marathi newspaper Lokmat.

She had also compiled and edited, Venchik Lok Kannio, a collection of Konkani folk tales in the Roman (Romi) script, which was published by the Goa Konkani Akademi, in 2008. It has been transliterated by Felicio Cardozo.

'Lokrang' (2008) is a collection of essays on Goan and Konkani folklore.

== Konkani writing ==
In A History of Konkani Literature: From 1500 to 1992, the linguist and Konkani writer Manohararāya Saradesāya (also Dr Manohar Rai Sardesai) says of the 1962-born Naik's collection of short stories, Garjan: "Garjan means The Roar and in fact here the woman conscious of her strength and her social rights "roars." It is a roar of revolt against the mightily and the rich in favour of the poor, the weak, the oppressed. There is vigour in her style but at times her expression lags behind her thoughts." He also comments on Jayanti Naik's Nimnnem Bondd (The Last Revolt) which "expresses dissatisfaction against the idea of God's justice" and adds: "It is true that the women writers are prone to a certain sentimentality but this sentimentality is hardly overdone." In 2019 Rajaee Publications published her third collection of short stories 'Aart'.

== Reception ==
Jyoti Kunkolienkar rates Naik (along with Hema Naik) as the authors writing on women-centric themes in Konkani from Goa today.

== Career ==
Besides English, her stories have been translated into Hindi, Marathi, Telugu and Malayalam.

She is the editor of the Konkani Akademi literary journal 'Ananya'.

Naik features in an anthology of Konkani writing, called Katha Darpan and published to mark the 138th anniversary of the Institute Menezes Braganza, in November 2009.

Naik was earlier with the Thomas Stephens Konknni Kendr, a Konkani training and research centre run out of Alto Porvorim in Goa. She became the first person to obtain a Ph.D. in Konkani, after she defended her thesis around 2005.

== Translations of her work ==
The Final Victory, a translation by Vidya Pai of Jayanti Naik's short story Jait. This appeared in the monthly Goa Today in October 1999.

Asaadi, a translation by Vidya Pai of Jayanti Naik's short story of the same name. (Samyukta—A Journal of Women's Studies, Vol III, No 2, July 2003, published by Women's Initiatives, Thiruvananthapuram. http://www.samyukta.org Editor GS Jayashree Post box 1162 Pattom Palace PO, Thiruvananthapuram, Kerala 695004.)

Basavo, also translated by Vidya Pai, is an English version of Naik's story of the same name. This was part of the British Council project of a website of women's writing from South Asia edited by Mini Krishnan and Rakshanda Jalil. This is not available currently.

Flowers and kumkum ----symbols of a woman's marital status (again by Vidya Pai) is a translation of Naik's essay Phool kumkum ---ayavpanache kurvo' appeared on 3 May 2015 in Chitrangi.

- "Uma and the Human Sacrifice" by Augusto Pinto and published 3 parts in The Navhind Times Goa between 13 and 27 October 2012
- "A fulfillment of a Desire" by Augusto Pinto published in 4 parts in The Navhind Times' Goa between 19 May to 8 June 2013
- "If Vozhoryo Curses then ..." translated in 4 parts in The Navind Times, Goa between 22 December 2012 and 5 January 2013
- "Biyantul: A Cinderella Story translated in 3 parts in The Navhind Times, Goa between 6 April 2013 and 20 April 2013.

The Salt of the Earth, a collection of eleven selected short stories of hers translated into English by Augusto Pinto was published in 2017 by Goa 1556 publishers. It contains a Preface by Dr Jayanti Naik and an Afterword by the translator entitled 'The Bahujan Writes Back'. The stories in this volume are 1) Biyantul: A Cinderella Story; 2) The Fulfillment of a Desire; 3) The Victory; 4) The Curse of Vozhrho; 5) An Account of Her Life; 6) Ramaa 7) Naman: The Invocations: 8) Fil'Mine Mana; 9) Life Sentence; 10) Uma and the Human Sacrifice; 11) Basvo: The Nandi Bull.

== Bibliography ==
Naik is a prolific author and besides folklore has written literature in a variety of genres including short stories, poetry, drama and children's literature. A list of her books is appended.

1. Garjan (Short Stories, 1989)
2. Ratha Tujea Ghudeo (Folklore, 1992)
3. Kaner Khunti Nari (Folklore, 1993)
4. Talay Ukhal’li Khellyani (Folklore, 1993)
5. Manalim Geetam (Folklore, 1993)
6. Amonem – Ek Lokjinn [Amona – Folk Culture] (Folklore, 1993)
7. Pednecho Dosro [The Dussehra Festival of Pernem] (Folklore, 1995)
8. Nagsherachem Sur [The Voice of Nagsher] (Folklore, 1996)
9. Lokbimb (Folklore, 1998)
10. Sorpanchi Karamat [A Snake's Traits] (Translation, 1998)
11. Konknni Lokkanyo [Konkani Folk Tales] (Folklore, 2000)
12. Vaghmamachi Fajitee [Uncle Tiger's Comeuppance] (Children's Literature, 2000)
13. Chad Shanyank Fatrachem Shith [The Over Smart Ones Get Stones in Their Rice] (Children's Literature, 2001)
14. Athang (Short Stories, 2002)
15. Navrangi Phul [The Flower of Nine Colours] (Children's Literature, 2002)
16. Bhurgheamkhatir Lokkanyo [Folk Tales for Children] (Children's Literature, 2002)
17. Karlechi Banvad [The Banvad of Karla Village???] (Folklore, 2002)
18. Sanulyanchi Kavnulam (Children's Literature, 2004)
19. Goenchim Lokkala [Goan Folklore] (Children's Literature, 2004)
20. Ganvran (Folklore, 2005)
21. Rajratna (Folklore, 2005)
22. Lokrang (Folklore, 2008)
23. Lokmanthan [Folk Churning] (Folklore, 2008)
24. Venchik Lokkannio [Folk Tales from Everywhere] (Folklore, 2008)
25. Kukumadevichi Deepmaal (Drama, 2009)
26. Mirgveno (Poems, 2010)
27. Visarjan [Immersion] (Translation, 2012)
28. Deshantaricheo Lokkatha - Bhag 1 [Folktales from .....] (Folklore, 2013)
29. Kalmayaa [Kalmaya ...] (Drama, 2014)
30. Mhaji Mati, Mhaji Mansha [My Land and My People] (Sketches, 2015)
31. The Salt of the Earth: Stories from Rustic Goa translated with an Afterword by Augusto Pinto (Goa 1556) (Short Stories in English, 2017)
32. Gutbandh (Folklore essays in Marathi, 2019)
33. Aart (Short Stories, 2019)

A collection of 9 essays by various critics on her Konkani short stories are collected in Jayantichi Katha: Aswaad ani Samiksha ed. Avadhut Amonkar, Rajaee Publications, 2006. This book also contains a detailed biographical and bibliographical information about her till 2005.

Detailed interviews with Jayanti Naik appeared in Jaag monthly in September 1998, in the March -May issue of Jaag in 2005, as well as in Goa Today in March 2005.

== Awards ==
She is the recipient of a number of State and National level awards, most noteworthy of which are the Kala Akademi Literary Award in 2002; the Dr TMA Pai Foundation's Best Konkani Book award for Konknni Lokkanyo in 2002; Sahitya Akademi Literary Award in 2004 for her collection of short stories ‘Athang’; and the Yashadamini Puraskar in 2009. She was awarded the 2019 Sahitya Akademi Translation Prize for her translation of the Hindi novel Zindaginama by Krishna Sobti into Konkani.
