= Nishtha Desai =

Indian scholar

- Education: Goa University (PhD)
- Occupation: Scholar
- Awards: Yashadamini Puraskar (2006); Real Heroes Award (2008)

Nishtha Desai is an Indian scholar who has worked towards improving conditions for children in Goa, India.

== Education and career ==
Desai has a Ph.D from Goa University where she researched Tristão de Bragança Cunha, a Goan nationalist and anti-colonial activist.

Desai worked with a children's organization in Goa which aims to improve their condition, and in 2012, she was the director. Desai raised awareness of tourism-related paedophilia, and the issues that arise because of limited punishment. She asked for tighter security in regards to this matter, and discussed gaps in the law.

== Selected publications ==
- Desai, Nishtha (2011). Liberation vs armed aggression : the media response to Goa's liberation. Panaji, Goa: Directorate of Art & Culture, Government of Goa. ISBN 9788192027111. OCLC 904796797.
- Desai, Nishtha (2004). See the evil : tourism related paedophilia in Goa (2nd ed.). Mumbai: Vikas Adhyayan Kendra. OCLC 56600473.
- Desai, Nishtha (2006). Child sexual abuse in Goa : a case analysis. OCLC 177083167.
- Desai, Nishtha (2015). The Life and Times of T. B. Cunha. Illustrations by Ved Prabhudesai. Directorate of Art and Culture, Panaji, Goa.

== Honors and awards ==
Desai was awarded the Yashadamini Puraskar award by the Government of Goa in 2006 for her work. She received the Real Heroes Award from CNN-IBN and Reliance Industries in 2008. Desai was honoured by the Moneylife Foundation in 2012.
