= Yashadamini Puraskar =

Award for women achievers in Goa, India

- Country: India
- Presented by: Government of Goa
- Reward: ₹10,000 (US$110)
- First award: 2001

Highlights
- Total awarded: 44 (2013)

The Yashadamini Puraskar is awarded by the Government of Goa state in (India). It is an annual award conferred by the Directorate of Women & Child Development of the Government of Goa. The award was established in 2001.

== Description ==
The award aims to encourage women in different fields. It is awarded to the women who have made a mark in various fields, such as sports, education, art and culture, social work, cooperative movement, women empowerment, teaching and other professions, etc.

The prize consists of a cash award of Rupees Ten Thousand and a silver salver.

== List of awardees ==
Following are some of the awardees of the Yashadamini Puraskar:

Year	Awardee
2001	Norma Alvares
2002	Phyllis Faria
2002	Meena Kakodkar
2002	Sanyogita Rane
2003	Auda Viegas
2004	Sudha Amonkar
2004	Dr. Lalana Bakhale
2004	Precila Dias
2004	Dr. Judith D'Costa
2004	Amita Nayak Salatry
2004	Celsa Antao
2004	Shalini Gaude
2004	Leena Pednekar
2006	Angela Naik
2006	Dr. Nishtha Desai
2006	Jyoti Kunkolienkar
2009	Vimal Dinanath Dabholkar
2009	Anita Kundatkar
2009	Monica Lobo Dourado
2009	Claudia Vaz
2009	Manisha Naik
2009	Amol Krishna Morajkar
2009	Nelly Rodrigues
2009	Jayanti Naik
2010	Steffi Cardozo
2011	Krishni Walke
2011	Seema Pednekar
2011	Aparnadevi Rane Sardesai
2011	Priyanka Rane
2011	Roopa Kerkar
2011	Gulab Vernekar
2011	Ashwini Zambaulikar
2011	Sachika Almeida
2011	Pushpal Dhaimodkar
2012	Shubhalaxmi Mandrekar
2012	Malini Chari
2012	Deeplaxmi Kumar Avati
2012	Sumedha Kamat Dessai
2012	Meghana Kurundwadkar
2012	Vijaya Sheldekar
2012	Suhasini Prabhugaonkar
2013	Ana Pinto
2013	Mangala More
2013	Shilpa Jagganath Bhosle
