= Centre for Post-Graduate Instruction and Research =

Coordinates: 15.496°N 73.823°E

The Centre for Post-Graduate Instruction and Research (CPIR) was the lone educational institution which offered post-graduate education in Goa between the early 1960s and 1985. It was set up soon after the end of Portuguese rule in Goa and functioned under the University of Bombay. A few thousand students undertook their Masters education there, and some of whom went on to take up senior responsibilities in fields like education, journalism, law and science. The CPIR has been described as "the first post-graduate campus of any state university in India [to function] outside its original jurisdiction".

== History, background ==
After the sudden end to Portuguese rule in Goa in 1961, higher education was sought to be expanded by the new Indian-directed administration through the University of Bombay. The CPIR got functional in Goa between June 1962 and continued working till the commencement of operations of the Goa University on June 1, 1985. This transitional period was marked also by a sudden shift-over of higher education from the medium of Portuguese to being largely in English.

Though there are some conflicting dates about when the CPIR was set up, the official Gazetteer of the Union Territory Goa, Daman and Diu, first published in 1979, also confirms that it was launched in June 1965.

It notes that the first post-Portuguese Rule colleges were set up in Panjim and in Margao around 1962, and students from these graduated in 1965, and hence they needed to go in for post-graduate education, which they went to the CPIR for. The CPIR came about "after the "Government of Goa subsequently approached the University of Bombay for advice and guidance." The latter resolved at its Senate meeting of April 30, 1965, to establish the centre in Goa to provide facilities for post graduate instruction and research.

Its small premises was located at the modest Sushila Building located along the arterial 18 June Road at the centre of the Goa capital of Panjim or Panaji. The CPIR's first director was the former head of the Goa Archives, Dr Pandurang Pissurlenkar.

== Undergraduate, post-graduate education ==
In the Goa of the 1960s, efforts were made to build a range of under-graduate institution in undergraduate (Bachelor's) faculties like the Arts, Sciences, Commerce, Law, Education, Engineering and Medicine. Likewise, in Dental, Pharmacy, Engineering, Architecture, Fine Arts and Education colleges were also set up—usually with one college in each stream in most cases. Two Law colleges, four Arts and Science and one Women's college were also established shortly later, by the 1980s, in Goa, by which time the State was still however yet to have its own university. All of these were then affiliated to the University of Bombay.

The CPIR offered affiliation to the first colleges that were instituted in Goa in June 1962. Till 1985, post-graduate education in Goa was entirely looked after by the modestly-sized CPIR "which had arrangements for post-graduate teaching and instruction in 13 subjects" and which "formed the nucleus for Goa University".

== Early years ==
Setting up of post-graduate education in Goa posed certain challenges in the 1960s—including necessitating a sudden transition from the Portuguese medium of education to English, and having to deal with a new administrative setup. Besides, the University of Bombay would also need to go beyond its State jurisdiction and offer affiliation to the post-graduate centre in Goa.

The University of Bombay Senate resolved to establish the CPIR in Panjim on April 30, 1965. Former Goa Archives Director Dr Pandurang Pissurlenkar donated his significant collection of mainly Goa-focussed books to the CPIR at the time of it being set up.

== Student numbers ==
At its launch, the CPIR provided instruction in only the subjects of English, Economics, Mathematics and Chemistry. Its regular teaching staff consisted of a Professor of English, an Honorary Professor of History, a temporary Reader in Economics (transferred from the University of Bombay's School of Economics) and a lecturer in Portuguese and French.

By sometime in the mid to late 1970s, the CPIR had facilities for teaching Economics, Philosophy, History, English, French, Hindi, Marathi, Portuguese (subsidiary only) and Education (all in the Faculty of Arts); Chemistry (Organic, Inorganic and Physical), Biochemistry and Mathematics in the Faculty of Science; and a Master's degree in Pharmacy in its Faculty of Technology, besides MD, MS, DA and DPM degrees in Medicine.

In its first academic year (1965–66), the CPIR began with a total of only 71 students, comprising 49 were for the Master of Arts degree and 22 for the M.Sc. degrees. Among these were 17 women. The following were admissions figures for some of the early batches:

Students at CPIR in its early years
Year	Number of students
First batch (1966)	71 students
Second batch (1967)	147 students
Third batch (1968)	198 students
Fourth batch (1969)	225 students
Fifth batch (1970)	253 students
Sixth batch (1971)	306 students
1972-73 batch	377 students

From the 1971-72 batch, the University of Bombay offered admissions for post-graduate courses in Education and Medicine. By the mid-1970s, the post-graduate students of the CPIR crossed one thousand.

This led to calls for the setting up of a separate university for Goa, which was proposed by a 1974 Bill, under which the apex institution was to be set up in Kundaim, in central Goa's Ponda sub-district, a decision which led to some debate and controversy.

== Recommendations ==
The Jha Committee proposed the setting up of a university, and the gradual development of the CPIR into a full-fledged varsity in five to ten years. This committee suggested that the CPIR could be developed as the nucleus for the varsity; CPIR be placed under a Board set up by the Goa government with cooperation from the University of Bombay; that the CPIR administrative work be carried out by an executive committee headed by a director; that it should be shifted to a suitable site; that the CPIR Board would have all powers of an educational institution including financial ones while the academic powers would be vested in the University of Bombay; that its Director be tasked with developing the CPIR into a future varsity; while other recommendations made keeping in view Goa's historical, geographic and cultural position. However, there was much discussion on various aspects of the setting up of a university, including over its venue. This finally came about in Goa not in the anticipated time-frame but only in the mid-1980s, under the Lieutenant Governorship of Dr. Gopal Singh.

== Role outgrown ==
Over the years, the CPIR played a changing role in a Goa that was itself undergoing change. Goa's political elites wanted the region to have a university of her own as "it would have been politically unpalatable to continue with [an] arrangement where the Centre for Postgraduate Instruction and Research (CPIR), which was established in 1974 [sic], was part of the University of Bombay (now Mumbai). For a newly carved independent federal entity aspiring for its graduation from a Union Territory to a full-fledged state, the establishment of a university would definitely have immense symbolic value and would also politically cater to the vocal (largely middle class) constituency at home."

The CPIR itself offered limited options for studies. For instance, it offered only four papers in Sociology as part of the overall MA programme in the social sciences; "the purposes being MA degree per se and sociology being incidental to it."

== Research, etc ==
Since the institution was active in times when resources were scarcely digitised, it can prove difficult to track work created by the CPIR. However, some references relevant to the field of Goa studies can be online, such as Amalia Quadros' The Development of Primary Education in Goa from 1910 to 1961, (CPIR, University of Bombay, 1974) in more recent studies. Other mention of work done by students and scholars affiliated to the CPIR can also be found on Google Scholar.

The CPIR has been listed in the Commonwealth Universities' Yearbook. It also played its role in organising seminars and events.

Among prominent educators associated with the CPIR were Prof. B.S. Shastry (1938-1991), the eminent Bombay-based historian Dr George Mark Moraes who flew-in for conducting classes on the weekend, Dr Mavinkurve (Microbiology), and others.Shastry did his doctorate in History under the prominent archivist P.S.S. Pissurlencar. Shastry began his career as a history lecturer at the Parvatibai Chowgule College in Margao, and went on the head the departments of History both at the CPIR and the Goa University. He was a research guide to a number of students. Other prominent educators linked to the CPIR were Prof. Dr. George Moraes, who was visiting faculty, History; Lavinio de Souza for History; Prof. Murphy, History; Prof. Kelekar of St. Xavier s College, Mapuca, History; Dr. K.M. Mathew, History, Dhempe College, who later became head of department of History Goa University.

At one stage, the CPIR conducted classes for the Diploma in Higher Education (DHE) course, which was a must for college teachers.

The role of the CPIR in the field of promoting research in local history has also been noted such as in the work of K.M. Mathews on Portuguese Navigation in India.

== Take-over in 1980s ==
The then Union Territory government of Goa, Daman and Diu passed a law under which the Goa University would take over, from the date "fixed by the [proposed Goa] University in consultation with the University of Bombay" the CPIR and "all rights, interests, titles and liabilities vested in that Centre immediately before that date, [which] shall vest in the University."

The law also allowed for the CPIR to be closed, as long as "any student who was studying in that Centre immediately before that date, shall be permitted to complete his course of study and the University shall provide him instructions, teaching and training for a period of five years from that date and such student shall be eligible to take such examination:" The law also laid down that "any other student who was eligible for any examination of the University of Bombay immediately before that date may take such examination."

After it ceased operations, the staff, assets and liabilities of the CPIR of the University of Bombay was taken over by the Goa University, with the latter taking care to see that its University statutes, governing the service conditions of teachers, did not adversely affect the teaching staff. Some of the teaching staff approached the courts later, over service conditions.

Dr. G.V. Kamat Helekar was the last Director of the CPIR, and had been appointed as member of the Executive Council of the new Goa University till his sudden death on October 17, 1985. Among those professors of the CPIR who are remembered for their work (some of whom moved on to the Goa University too) were Prof Antarkar, Prof Pande, Prof Gramopadhye, Prof Wader, Prof Sadashiv Deo (Mathematics), Prof Ashok K. Joshii (English), Prof S. S. Kulkarni (English), Prof Adi Doctor (Political Science), Prof B. S. Shastry (History), Prof Paknikar, Prof Heblekar (Economics), Prof A.V. Afonso (Philosophy).

Dr. Gopal Singh, the former Lieutenant Governor of Goa and ex-chairman of the National Minority Commission of India, has been credited with taking "complete charge of the challenging transitional period—converting [the] CPIR into [the] Goa University." By May 1985, the Goa government completed the transfer of the CPIR from a small building in Panjim to a section of the then newly-built, vacant premises of the Goa Medical College at Bambolim.
