= Ramakant Khalap =

Indian politician (born 1946)

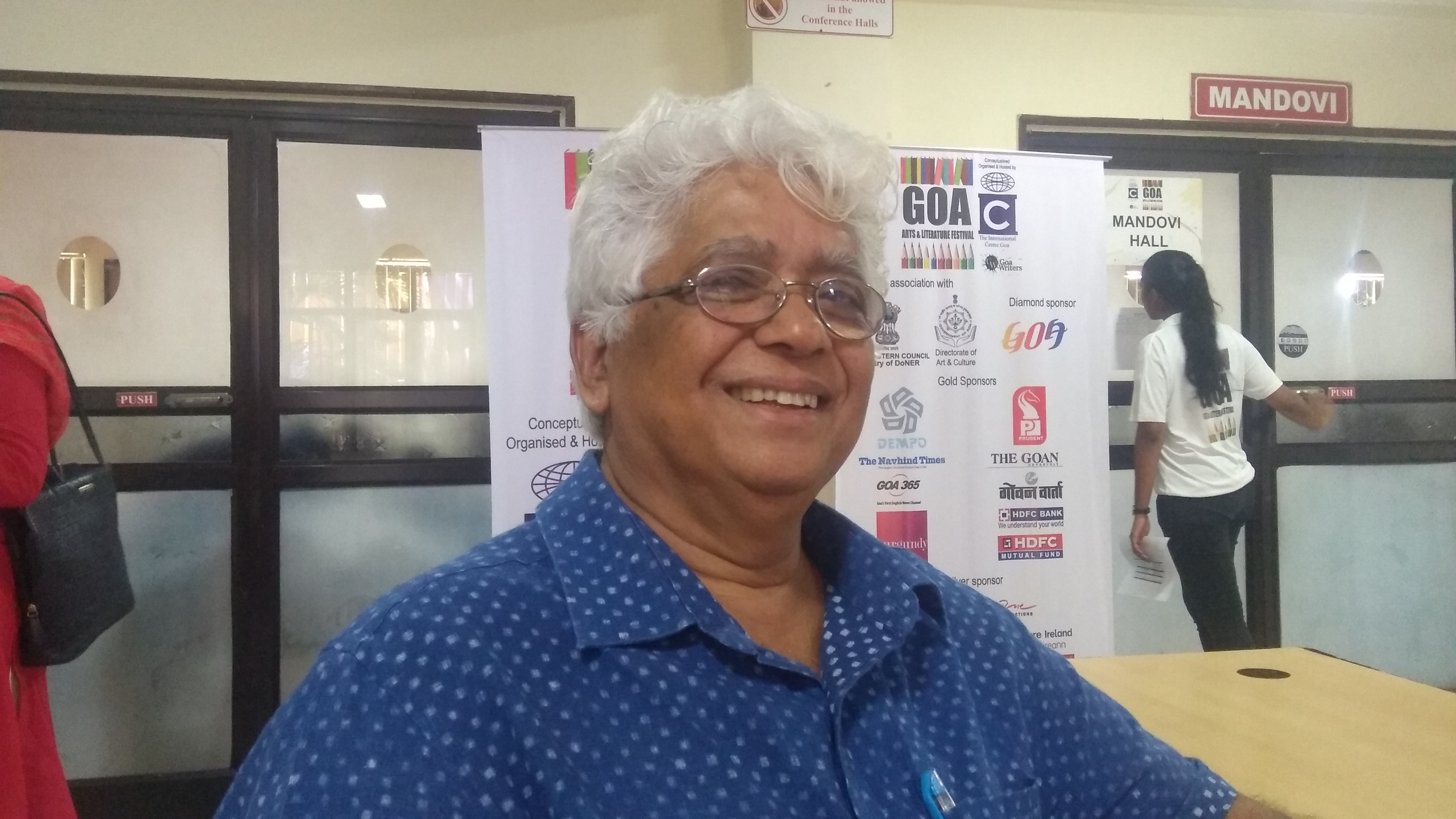
- Khalap in 2017

2nd Deputy Chief Minister of Goa
- In office 27 March 1990 – 14 December 1990
- Preceded by: Wilfred de Souza
- Succeeded by: Wilfred de Souza

Member of Parliament, Lok Sabha
- In office 10 May 1996 – 28 February 1998
- Preceded by: Harish Zantye
- Succeeded by: Ravi Naik
- Constituency: North Goa

Member of the Goa Legislative Assembly
- In office 1999–2002
- Preceded by: Sangeeta Parab
- Succeeded by: Laxmikant Parsekar
- Constituency: Mandrem
- In office 1974–1994
- Preceded by: Dayanand Bandodkar
- Succeeded by: Sangeeta Parab
- Constituency: Mandrem

Personal details
- Born: 5 July 1946 (age 79) Mandrem, Goa, Portuguese India
- Party: Maharashtrawadi Gomantak Party; Bharatiya Janata Party; Indian National Congress
- Spouse: Nirmala Khalap
- Children: 2

Ramakant Dattaram Khalap (born 5 August 1946) is an Indian advocate and politician who served as the second Deputy Chief Minister of Goa from March to December 1990. He also served as a Member of Parliament, representing North Goa in the Lok Sabha from 1996 to 1998.

== Early life ==
Ramakant Khalap was born on 5 August 1946 in Mandrem, Portuguese India to a Marathi couple, Dattaram and Satyabhama Khalap. He worked as a school teacher and later as a college lecturer. After this, he completed a law degree.

== Personal life ==
Khalap is a Maratha by caste. He is married to Nirmala Khalap and has three sons, Shriniwas (lawyer) married to Shraddha Khalap who contested the 2017 Goa Legislative Assembly election on Aam Aadmi Party ticket from Mapusa constituency; Nikhilchandra (Civil engineer) married to Pratiksha (a doctor and clinical researcher by profession); and Ashwin (hotelier).
