= Olivinho J. F. Gomes =

Indian scholar and poet (1949–2009)

Olivinho Gomes
- Portrait of Gomes
- Born: 1943; Santo Estêvão, Goa, Portuguese India
- Died: 30 July 2009 (aged 65–66); Goa, India
- Education: Ph.D. in Sociology
- Occupations: Scholar, polyglot writer, poet, translator, broadcaster and telecaster. Former Head of the Konkani Department, Goa University. Former Acting Vice Chancellor, Goa University.
- Writing career
- Language: Konkani
- Notable work: Village Goa
- Notable awards: Sahitya Akademi Translation Prize (1993)

Olivinho J. F. Gomes (1949 – 30 July 2009) was an Indian Konkani scholar and former acting vice-chancellor of the Goa University.

== Scholar, and more ==
A noted scholar, polyglot writer, poet, translator, broadcaster and telecaster, Dr Gomes had over 40 published books to his credit. He initially started off as a government official with the Central Government of India, in the Indian Revenue Service, but later on shifted to academia and moved on to joining the Goa University's Konkani department.

Gomes has presented papers and lectures at seminars and conferences in Goa, the rest of India and overseas. His field of specialisation was language, literature, translation studies, history, sociology and culture. His Konkani writings resulted in him being included in the executive board of the Indian institution of letters the Sahitya Akademi as a representative for the Konkani language, a member of the experts panel of the University Grants Commission, the National Council of Educational Research and Training, the Union Public Service Commission, the K K Birla Foundation, and the Indian Languages Promotion Council, among others.

== Camoes into Konkani ==
Professor Gomes had a fascination from his student days with the verse of the Portuguese national poet Luís de Camões. He spent five years of his spare time to translate the epic poet's work into one of India's smallest national languages, but his mother-tongue, Konkani. On the lines of the classical Sanskrit epic of India, the Ramayana, Gomes has called his 747-page translation work Luzitayonn. Gomes has argued that there is a "preponderance of probability" that Camoes wrote the epic or a substantial part of it in Goa, "where he wrote most of his poetry".

== From bureaucracy to academia ==
Gomes, who was born Portuguese, did his PhD in Sociology, got into the Indian Customs and Central Excise higher echelons through the Indian Revenue Service, and then gave up that all to shift back to Goa in 1987 for a life as a scholar.

== List of books ==
These are some books authored by Dr. Gomes:

- Eka Goenkarachi bhaili bhonvddi, Konknnni Sorospot Prakashan, 2007
- Konkani Folk Tales, Retold. NBT, 2007, reprint 2008. ISBN 978-81-237-5083-5
- Goa, National Book Trust, India, 2004
- The Religious Orders in Goa: XVIth-XVII Centuries, Konkani Sorospot Prakashan, 2003
- Old Konkani language and literature: the Portuguese role. Edited by O. Gomes. Konkani Sorospot Prakashan, 1999.
- Simple Folk, a translation of Os Simples, a collection of poetry of Portuguese poet, Guerra Junqueiro, (1998).
- Village Goa, Chand (S.) & Co Ltd, India, October 1996 Hardcover
- Sondesh, translation into Konkani of the poetry of Fernando Pessoa's Mensagem (Portuguese) (1992).
- Koṅkaṇī saraspatico itihāsa, Koṅkaṇī Saraspata Prakāśana, 1989
- Village Goa, S. Chand, 1987
- Ḍô. Phrā. Lu. Gomiś, Koṅkaṇī Saraspata Prakāśana, 1984
- Mana voḍaṭāvoḍanā, Koṅkaṇī Sāhitya Prakāśana, 1981
- Dr. Francisco Luis Gomes, jivit ani vavr, Konknni Sorospot Prokaxon, 1968

== Other work ==
- Gomes, Olivinho IF. "Grammatical Studies in Konkani: A Critical Overview." South Asian Language Review 2 (1992): 1.
- Gomes, Olivinho. "The Konkani Flavor in Goa’s Spoken Portuguese, as Witnessed in GIP’s Jacob e Dulce." Episódio Oriental (2007).
- Gomes, Olivinho. "Goan Identity in Crisis!." Goa Today August (2002): 54–9.
- Gomes, Olivinho. "The Konkani Scene: Writing amidst Blood and Tears." Indian Literature (1987): 101–110.
- Gomes, Olivinho. "Konkani Scene: A Sprightly Scenario." Indian Literature (1992): 142–147.
