= Mandrem Assembly constituency =

Legislative Assembly constituency in Goa State, India

Coordinates: 15.66°N 73.74°E

Mandrem
- Constituency No. 1 for the Goa Legislative Assembly

Constituency details
- Country: India
- Region: Western India
- State: Goa
- District: North Goa
- Lok Sabha constituency: North Goa
- Established: 1963
- Total electors: 32,732
- Reservation: None

Member of Legislative Assembly
- 8th Goa Legislative Assembly
- Incumbent Jit Arolkar
- Party: MGP
- Alliance: NDA
- Elected year: 2022

Mandrem Assembly constituency is one of the 40 Legislative Assembly constituencies of Goa state in India. Mandrem is also one of the 20 constituencies falling under North Goa Lok Sabha constituency.

It is part of North Goa district.

== Members of the Legislative Assembly ==
Year	Member	Party
1963	Vijay Kamulkar	Maharashtrawadi Gomantak Party
1967	Anthony de Souza	Maharashtrawadi Gomantak Party
1972	Dayanand Bandodkar	Maharashtrawadi Gomantak Party
1974^	Ramakant Khalap	Maharashtrawadi Gomantak Party
1977	Ramakant Khalap	Maharashtrawadi Gomantak Party
1980	Ramakant Khalap	Maharashtrawadi Gomantak Party
1984	Ramakant Khalap	Maharashtrawadi Gomantak Party
1989	Ramakant Khalap	Maharashtrawadi Gomantak Party
1994	Sangeeta Parab	Indian National Congress
1999	Ramakant Khalap	Maharashtrawadi Gomantak Party
2002	Laxmikant Parsekar	Bharatiya Janata Party
2007	Laxmikant Parsekar	Bharatiya Janata Party
2012	Laxmikant Parsekar	Bharatiya Janata Party
2017	Dayanand Sopte	Indian National Congress
2019^	Dayanand Sopte	Bharatiya Janata Party
2022	Jit Arolkar	Maharashtrawadi Gomantak Party

^ by-election

== Election results ==
=== 2027 Assembly election ===
2027 Goa Legislative Assembly election: Mandrem
Party	Candidate	Votes	%	±%
INC				
NDA				
NOTA	None of the above			
Majority				
Turnout				
gain from		Swing		

=== Assembly Election 2022 ===
2022 Goa Legislative Assembly election : Mandrem
Party	Candidate	Votes	%	±%
MGP	Jit Arolkar	10,387	35.35	New
BJP	Dayanand Sopte	9,672	32.92	▼15.73
Independent	Laxmikant Parsekar	5,811	19.78	New
GFP	Deepak Bhalchandra Kalangutkar	1,676	5.70	New
RGP	Sunayana Rajanikant Gawde	1,219	4.15	New
AAP	Prasad K. Shahapurkar	268	0.91	New
NOTA	None of the Above	261	0.89	▼0.72
Independent	Satish Sitaram Shetgaonkar	184	0.63	New
Margin of victory		715	2.43	▼12.47
Turnout		29,382	90.89	▲3.67
Registered electors		32,732		▲1.80
MGP gain from BJP		Swing	▼13.30	

=== Assembly By-election 2019 ===
2019 Goa Legislative Assembly by-election : Mandrem
Party	Candidate	Votes	%	±%
BJP	Dayanand Sopte	13,468	48.65	▲15.14
Independent	Jit Arolkar	9,343	33.75	New
INC	Babi Shiva Ba Kar	4,239	15.31	▼43.65
GSM	Swaroo Jaidev Naik	632	2.28	New
NOTA	None of the above	446	1.61	▲0.13
Margin of victory		4,125	14.90	▼10.55
Turnout		27,682	86.09	▼3.06
Registered electors		32,153		▲2.50
BJP gain from INC		Swing	▼10.31	

=== Assembly Election 2017 ===
2017 Goa Legislative Assembly election : Mandrem
Party	Candidate	Votes	%	±%
INC	Dayanand Sopte	16,490	58.96	▲26.10
BJP	Laxmikant Parsekar	9,371	33.51	▼12.60
MGP	Shridhar Ladu Manjrekar	678	2.42	New
AAP	Devendra Krishnaji Prabhu Parsekar Desai	620	2.22	New
NOTA	None of the Above	415	1.48	New
NCP	Rajendra M. Satelkar	234	0.84	New
Margin of victory		7,119	25.46	▲12.21
Turnout		27,966	89.15	▲0.85
Registered electors		31,369		▲6.83
INC gain from BJP		Swing	▲12.86	

=== Assembly Election 2012 ===
2012 Goa Legislative Assembly election : Mandrem
Party	Candidate	Votes	%	±%
BJP	Laxmikant Parsekar	11,955	46.11	▲10.57
INC	Dayanand Sopte	8,520	32.86	▲7.69
AITC	Sameer Salgaocar	4,591	17.71	New
Goa Vikas Party	Menino Francis Monteiro	295	1.14	New
Independent	Sanjay Prabhu Dessai	292	1.13	New
Samajwadi Janata Party (ChandraShekhar)	Sanjay Damu Kole	275	1.06	New
Margin of victory		3,435	13.25	▲2.87
Turnout		25,928	88.43	▲8.29
Registered electors		29,364		▲42.53
BJP hold		Swing	▲10.57	

=== Assembly Election 2007 ===
2007 Goa Legislative Assembly election : Mandrem
Party	Candidate	Votes	%	±%
BJP	Laxmikant Parsekar	5,858	35.54	▼3.51
INC	Ramakant Khalap	4,148	25.17	▼7.93
MGP	Manjrekar Shridhar	2,542	15.42	▲13.16
Independent	Sangeeta Gopal Parab	1,949	11.82	New
Independent	Palyekar Pradip Dattaram	849	5.15	New
Independent	Devendra Deshprabhu	679	4.12	New
UGDP	Monteiro Menino Francis	458	2.78	New
Margin of victory		1,710	10.37	▲4.42
Turnout		16,483	80.14	▲1.67
Registered electors		20,602		▲5.84
BJP hold		Swing	▼3.51	

=== Assembly Election 2002 ===
2002 Goa Legislative Assembly election : Mandrem
Party	Candidate	Votes	%	±%
BJP	Laxmikant Parsekar	5,955	39.05	New
INC	Khalap Ramakant	5,047	33.10	New
Independent	Parab Sangeeta Gopal	2,958	19.40	New
SS	Bagkar Anil Shiva	652	4.28	New
MGP	Gawandi Hanumant Ganesh	345	2.26	▼37.34
Independent	Louis Lawrence Fernandes	165	1.08	New
Independent	Mhamal Ashok Dhaku	128	0.84	New
Margin of victory		908	5.95	▼2.71
Turnout		15,250	78.38	▲5.02
Registered electors		19,466		▲4.65
BJP gain from MGP		Swing	▼0.55	

=== Assembly Election 1999 ===
1999 Goa Legislative Assembly election : Mandrem
Party	Candidate	Votes	%	±%
MGP	Ramakant Khalap	5,401	39.60	New
INC	Parab Sangeeta Gopal	4,219	30.94	
BJP	Parsekar Laximikant Yeshwant	3,017	22.12	New
Independent	Vengurlekar Anant Mahadev	372	2.73	New
SS	Poke Yeshwant Laxman	243	1.78	New
Independent	Poke Govind Sadashiv	154	1.13	New
Independent	Kashalkar Vishnu Vithal	133	0.98	New
Margin of victory		1,182	8.67	▲4.13
Turnout		13,638	73.32	▼3.84
Registered electors		18,601		▲2.93
MGP gain from INC		Swing	▼10.52	

=== Assembly Election 1994 ===
1994 Goa Legislative Assembly election : Mandrem
Party	Candidate	Votes	%	±%
INC	Parab Sangeeta Gopal	6,989	50.12	New
MGP	Khalap Ramakant Dattaram	6,356	45.58	
BSP	Jadhav Chandrakant Sakharam	290	2.08	New
Independent	Naik Bapla Raya	204	1.46	New
Margin of victory		633	4.54	▼5.23
Turnout		13,945	78.03	▼1.63
Registered electors		18,072		▲8.57
INC gain from MGP		Swing	▼2.49	

=== Assembly Election 1989 ===
1989 Goa Legislative Assembly election : Mandrem
Party	Candidate	Votes	%	±%
MGP	Ramakant Khalap	6,900	52.61	▲1.40
INC	Porobo Sangita Gopal	5,619	42.84	New
Independent	Parshekar Laxmikant Yeshwant	360	2.74	New
Independent	Parshekar Rudraji Shivram	113	0.81	New
Independent	Gaonkar Babuso Savlo	99	0.71	New
Margin of victory		1,281	9.77	▼5.51
Turnout		13,115	78.82	▲1.50
Registered electors		16,645		▼0.95
MGP hold		Swing	▲1.40	

=== Assembly Election 1984 ===
1984 Goa, Daman and Diu Legislative Assembly election : Mandrem
Party	Candidate	Votes	%	±%
MGP	Ramakant Khalap	6,652	51.21	▲0.48
INC	Parab Gopal Atmaram	4,667	35.93	New
Independent	Deshprabhu Rajendra Vasudev	1,030	7.93	New
Independent	Shetgaonkar Ratnakant Vishram	421	3.24	New
CPI	Harmalkar Namdev Shankar	166	1.28	New
Margin of victory		1,985	15.28	▲11.71
Turnout		12,989	79.39	▲5.74
Registered electors		16,805		▲6.96
MGP hold		Swing	▲0.48	

=== Assembly Election 1980 ===
1980 Goa, Daman and Diu Legislative Assembly election : Mandrem
Party	Candidate	Votes	%	±%
MGP	Ramakant Khalap	5,703	50.73	▼5.91
INC(I)	Parab Gopal Atmaram	5,301	47.15	New
JP	Telang Vishnu Shankar	238	2.12	New
Margin of victory		402	3.58	▼17.63
Turnout		11,242	73.78	▲9.17
Registered electors		15,712		▲2.91
MGP hold		Swing	▼5.91	

=== Assembly Election 1977 ===
1977 Goa, Daman and Diu Legislative Assembly election : Mandrem
Party	Candidate	Votes	%	±%
MGP	Ramakant Khalap	5,394	56.64	▼16.29
INC	Parab Gopal Atmaram	3,375	35.44	New
JP	Fernandes Santan Janu Vario	754	7.92	New
Margin of victory		2,019	21.20	▼34.00
Turnout		9,523	63.62	▼8.89
Registered electors		15,267		▼3.87
MGP hold		Swing	▼16.29	

=== Assembly Election 1972 ===
1972 Goa, Daman and Diu Legislative Assembly election : Mandrem
Party	Candidate	Votes	%	±%
MGP	Dayanand Bandodkar	8,254	72.93	▲1.28
INC	Kamulkar Vijay Maruti	2,006	17.72	New
UGP	D. Kunha S. Karidade	863	7.63	New
MGP	Wadohi Bablo Laxman	195	1.72	
Margin of victory		6,248	55.20	▼0.47
Turnout		11,318	72.96	▲6.75
Registered electors		15,881		▲6.28
MGP hold		Swing	▲1.28	

=== Assembly Election 1967 ===
1967 Goa, Daman and Diu Legislative Assembly election : Mandrem
Party	Candidate	Votes	%	±%
MGP	Anthony D'Souza	6,907	71.65	New
UGP	K. M. Vinayak	1,540	15.98	New
Independent	G. N. Mukund	445	4.62	New
Independent	M. H. Naik	176	1.83	New
Independent	S. R. Bhisu	155	1.61	New
Independent	A. N. Waman	148	1.54	New
Independent	P. D. Y. Laxman	127	1.32	New
Margin of victory		5,367	55.67	
Turnout		9,640	68.85	
Registered electors		14,942		
MGP win (new seat)				

== See also ==
- List of constituencies of the Goa Legislative Assembly
- North Goa district
