= Sulochana Katkar =

Indian politician (1929–2012)

Nominated MLA, Goa Legislative Assembly
- In office January 1985 – November 1989

Personal details
- Born: 1929; Bandora, Ponda taluka, Portuguese Goa
- Died: 22 September 2012 (aged 82–83); Margao, Goa
- Occupation: Politician

Sulochana Ramakant Katkar (1929–2012) was an Indian politician and a member of the Indian National Congress in Goa. She served as a nominated member of the Goa, Daman and Diu Legislative Assembly from 1984 to 1989 and was the longest-serving president of the Goa Pradesh Congress Committee (GPCC).

== Early life and political career ==
Katkar was born in Bandora in Ponda taluka, Goa. She joined the Indian National Congress in the late 1970s and worked alongside Purushottam Kakodkar, R. Deshprabhu, and Praful Priolkar. She was associated with then-Prime Minister Indira Gandhi during the formation of the government in 1980.

== Legislative tenure ==
In the 1980 and 1984 elections, the Goa, Daman and Diu Legislative Assembly did not have any elected female members. To address this, Chief Minister Pratapsingh Rane nominated Katkar, along with Phyllis Faria and Sangeeta Parab, to the assembly for the term 1984–1989. This nomination was intended to ensure representation for women and other underrepresented groups.

== GPCC presidency ==
Katkar served as the president of the Goa Pradesh Congress Committee for an extended period. During her tenure, she contributed to the party's activities and organizational work in Goa. She was known for her firm approach in maintaining party discipline and policies.

== Death and legacy ==
Sulochana Katkar died on 22 September 2012 at the age of 83, in a private hospital in Margao, Goa, after a brief illness. She had undergone backbone surgery before she died. The GPCC honored her contributions during the 30th anniversary of Goa's statehood in 2016.
