= Pandurang Pissurlekar =

Indian historian (1894–1969)

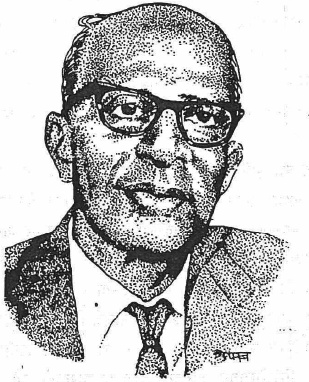
- Portrait of Pandurang Pissurlekar
- Born: Pandurang Sakharam Shenvi Pissurlencar; 30 May 1894; Pissurlem, Sattari, Portuguese Goa
- Died: 10 July 1969 (aged 75); Panaji, Goa, India
- Education: Liceu Nacional Afonso de Albuquerque
- Occupation: Archivist
- Spouse: Ramabai Borkar (m. 1913)
- Awards: Knight of the Military Order of Santiago (1935)

Pandurang Sakharam Shenvi Pissurlencar (30 May 1894 – 10 July 1969) was an Indian historian, archivist, and scholar of Maratha history. He is credited with organizing and expanding the Goa State Archives and making rare historical documents accessible to scholars. Due to his contributions, he is often referred to as the "Father of the Goa State Archives."

== Early and personal life ==
Pissurlencar was born on 30 May 1894 in the village of Pissurlem, Sattari, Portuguese Goa. His mother was named Krishnabai. He received his primary education in Marathi before pursuing Portuguese studies at the Liceu Nacional Afonso de Albuquerque in 1913 and Escola Normal in Nova Goa. In 1916, obtained a degree of teaching and began working at the Bicholim government school.

His proficiency in the Portuguese language enabled him to teach Portuguese and arithmetic at schools in Valpoi, Sanquelim, Velha Goa, and Nerul.

At the age of 19, in 1913, he married Ramabai Borkar.

Besides Portuguese, he was also proficient in French, English, Konkani, Sanskrit and Marathi. He could also understand the Modi language.

== Career ==
Pissurlencar developed a keen interest in archival research and obtained permission from the Portuguese authorities to access historical records preserved in the Secretariat archives since 1919. In recognition of his expertise, he was appointed in 1931 as the chief of the newly formed General and Historical Archives of Portuguese India.

Though the Portuguese authorities initially favoured him, his loyalty to them conflicted with his allegiance to Goa and India. When Portugal took the "Right of Passage" case to the International Court of Justice at The Hague, Pissurlencar diplomatically refused to support the Portuguese side.

== Contributions to history and archival work ==
Pissurlencar is credited with systematically organizing the Goa State Archives and making rare documents available to scholars. He worked on the restoration and preservation of rare documents, and published a guide to this collection.

As he worked on the restoration of these documents, he slowly began his own research. He published articles in O Oriente Portuguese and in O Heraldo. His published books include Regimentos das Fortalezas da India (1951), Agentes da Diplomacia Portuguesa na India (1952) and Assentos do Conselho do Estado (1953–57).

He was also a scholar of Maratha history, publishing several articles in the Boletim do Instituto Vasco da Gama, the publication of the Institute Vasco da Gama. His research was well regarded among historians, and he received praise for his work.

== Later career ==
Towards the end of his career, Pissurlencar delivered the "N. C. Kelkar Memorial Lectures" in Marathi at the University of Poona in March 1969. His work in historiography was widely recognized, and he received awards from various academic institutions in India and abroad.

In 1965, he was appointed Honorary Professor of History at a Centre for Post-Graduate Instruction and Research in Goa. His personal collection of books and documents was donated to this institution, which is now a part of Goa University.

== Awards and accolades ==
In 1935, the Portuguese government awarded him the Knight of the Military Order of Santiago. In 1948, the Royal Asiatic Society of Bengal awarded him the Sir Judanath Sarkar Gold Medal. In 1953, the Asiatic Society awarded him the gold medal.

In 1952, the Portuguese government awarded him the position of Conservador do Arquivo (transl. Conservator of Archives). He retired from this position in 1961.

The Lisbon University conferred the DLit degree upon him and felicitated him.

In 1979, Brahamaharashtra Mandal awarded him with a gold medal for his research in history.

== Death ==
Pissurlencar died on 10 July 1969 in Panaji.

== Works ==
- Regimentos das Fortalezas da India (1951)
- Agentes da Diplomacia Portuguesa na India (1952)
- Assentos do Conselho do Estado (1953–57)
