= Mapusa Municipal Council =

Mapusa municipal council is the municipality of Mapusa, the main commercial town in North Goa, located in the Bardez taluka.

== Location ==
The municipality office and premises was till recently based at Feira Alta, on the slope going up to the Altinho locality of Mapusa. It has now been shifted to the renovated old school premises where the St Mary's Convent previously functioned.

Mapusa municipal council
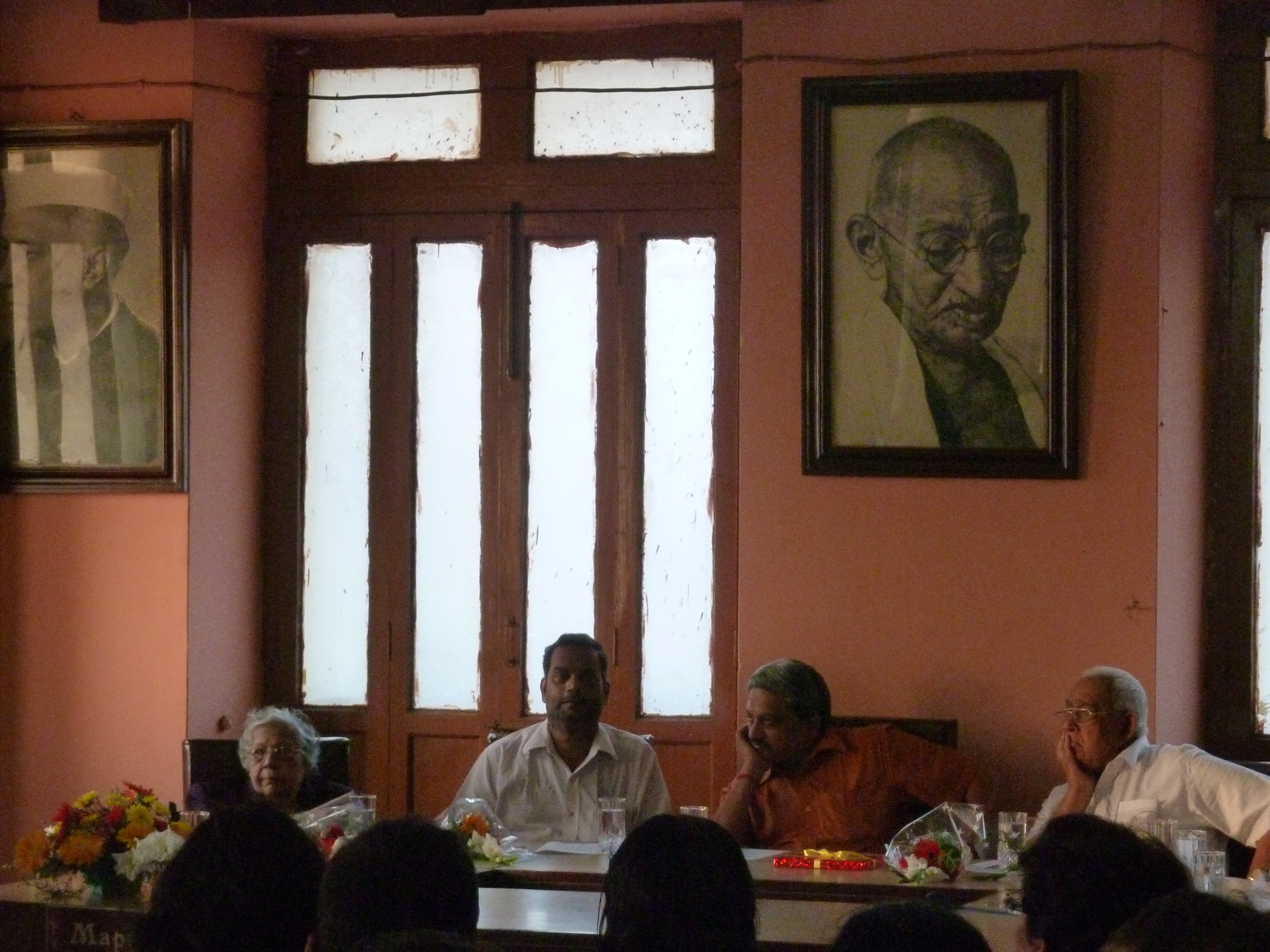
Meeting at the old Mapusa municipality hall

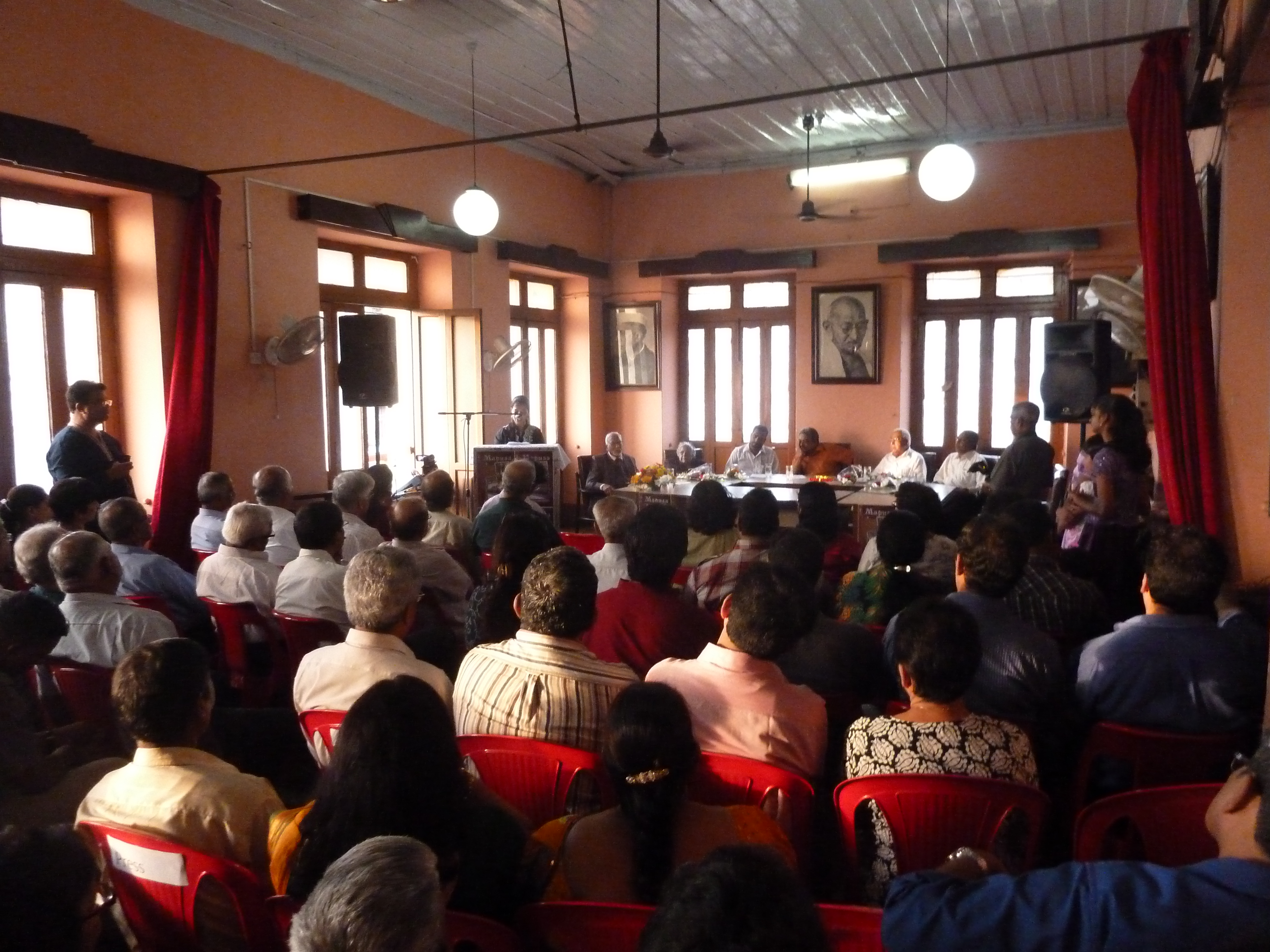
Gathering in the old Mapusa Municipality hall, circa 2013.
Mapusa, Goa.
