= Dayanand Sopte =

Indian politician

Member of Goa Legislative Assembly
- In office 2017–2022
- Constituency: Mandrem

Personal details
- Born: 2 April 1964 (age 62) Parsem (Goa)
- Party: Bharatiya Janata Party
- Other political affiliations: Indian National Congress
- Education: B. Com.

Dayanand Raghunath Sopte is an Indian politician and former member of Goa Legislative Assembly from Mandrem assembly constituency.
