= Goa University =

Public university in Goa, India

- Crest of Goa University
- Motto: "Knowledge is Divine"
- Type: Public
- Established: 1 December 1984; 41 years ago
- Affiliations: UGC, NAAC, AIU
- Chancellor: Governor of Goa
- Vice-Chancellor: Rajendra Gad
- Location: Taleigão, Goa, India
- Campus: Urban
- Website: www.unigoa.ac.in

Goa University is a public state university headquartered in the city of Panaji, in the Indian state of Goa.

The traditions of Goa University date back to the 17th century, with the creation of the first university courses by the Portuguese Empire. However, it was only after the annexation of Goa that the process was consolidated, with the University of Mumbai establishing a Centre for Post-Graduate Instruction and Research (CPIR) in Panaji. The CPIR offered affiliation to the first colleges that were instituted in Goa in June 1962. Was established under the Goa University Act of 1984 (Act No. 7 of 1984) and commenced operations on 1 June 1985, replacing CPIR. The university offers graduate and post-graduate studies and research programmes. It is currently (2014–19) accredited by the National Assessment and Accreditation Council in India with a rating of A Grade.

It is one of India's few universities offering western languages such as Portuguese and French. The university's Department of Portuguese and Lusophone Studies is the only such in the entire Indian subcontinent.

== History ==
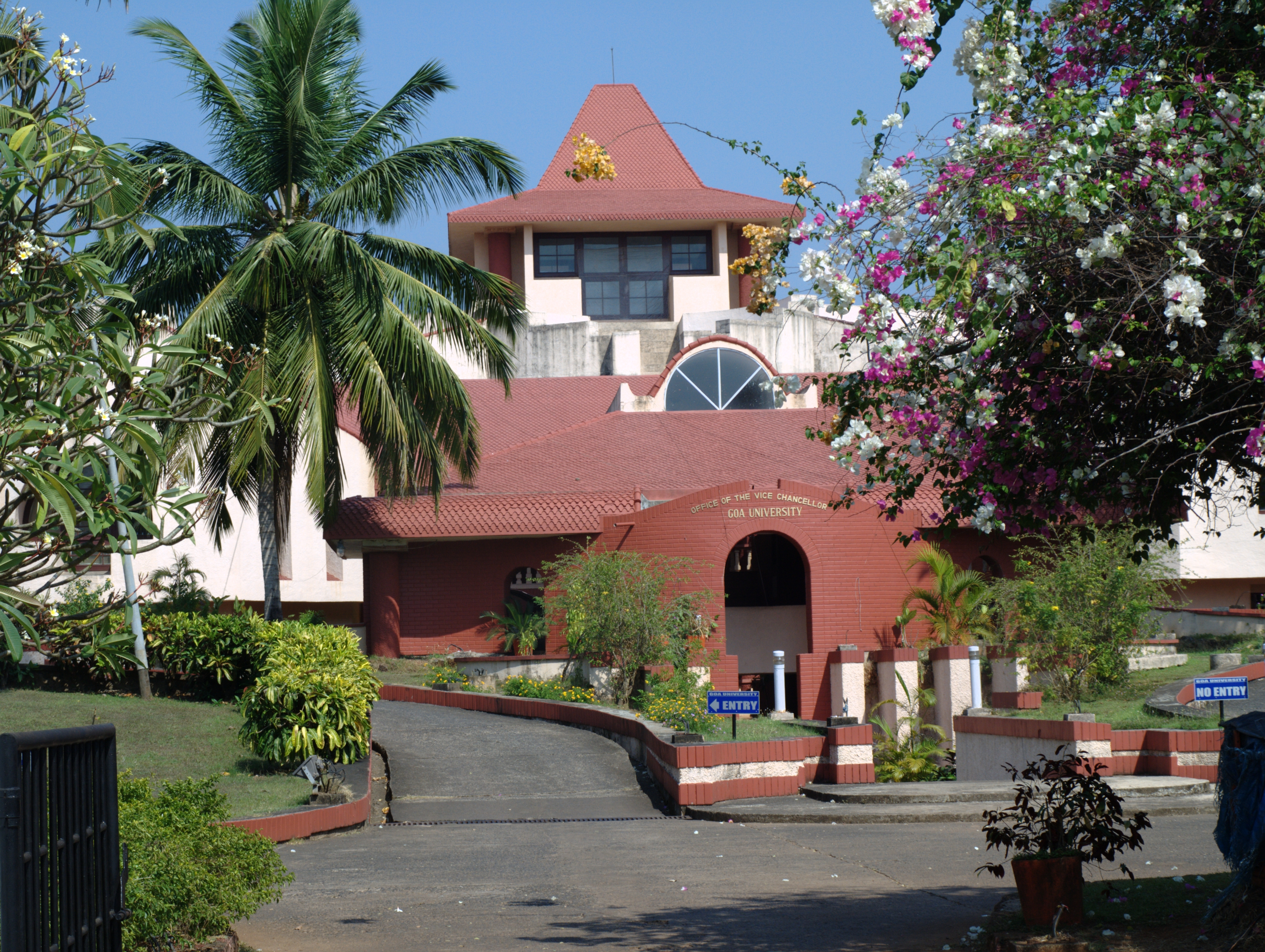
Goa University, main admin block.

The university tradition of the Goa University also began during the Portuguese rule, with the installation of several institutions of higher education, the oldest one being the Goa Medical College, dating from 1691, followed by the Mathematical and Military School, founded in 1817, and Goa College of Pharmacy, founded in 1842. These schools (with the exception of the Mathematical and Military School, which was abolished in 1871) gradually formed the Goa University when it was founded.

=== University Education in post-annexation of Goa ===
Within less than six months after the annexation of Goa, two colleges were started as a result of private initiatives and the government's backing:

- Dhempe College of Arts and Science, Panjim (1962);
- Parvatibai Chowgule College of Arts and Science, Margao (1962).

In the very first year, the number of students who registered in these two colleges added up to 879.

Other colleges were soon established:

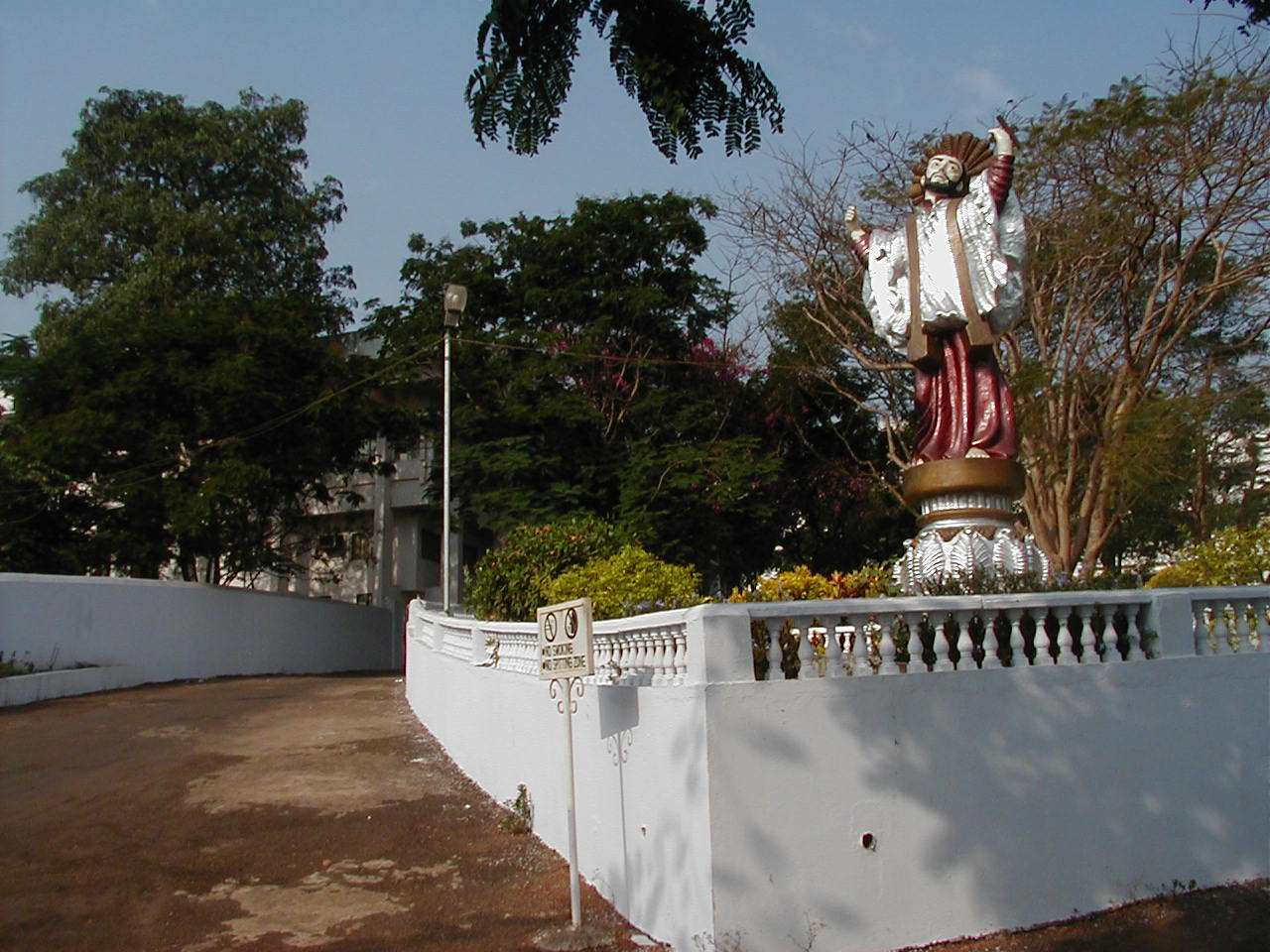
St Xavier's, another early college from Goa.

- St. Xavier's College, Mapusa, Goa, Mapusa (1963)
- Carmel College for Women, Nuvem (1964)
- S.S. Dempo College of Commerce and Economics (1966)
- Goa Engineering College (1967)

As these institutions and more came into existence, the question of affiliation surfaced and led to some debate since Goa was a Union Territory, and it was suggested they be affiliated to the Delhi University. However the colleges opted to be affiliated to the Mumbai University and at the request of the Government of Goa, the Centre of Post-Graduate Instruction and Research was started in Goa by the Mumbai University with the support of the Goa administration.

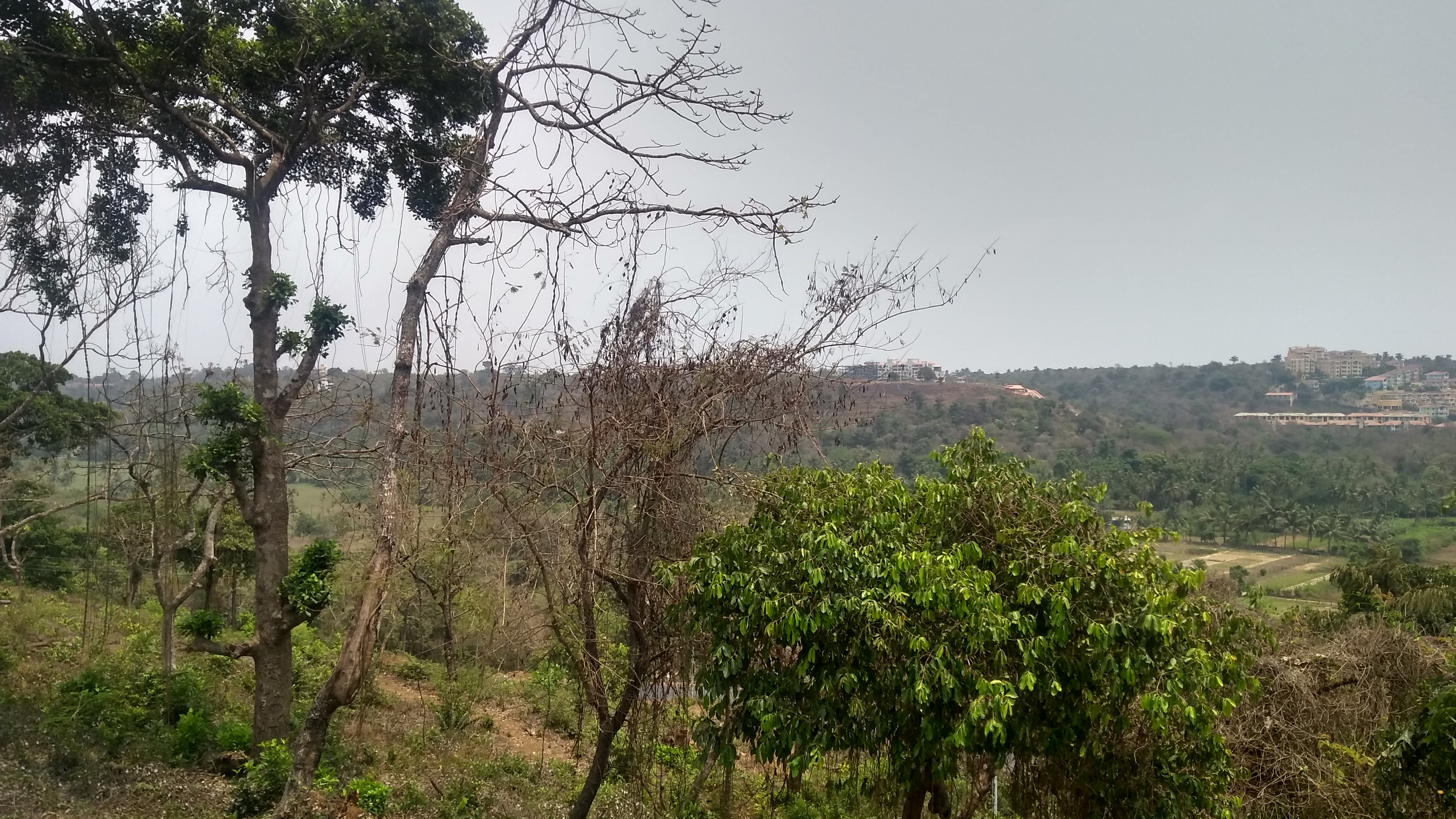
The Goa University's permanent home is close to the Taleigau-Bambolim plateau, with river and sea visible on some sides.

The Jha Committee proposed the establishment of a university in Goa, and recommended its gradual development from the Centre for Post-Graduate Instruction and Research (CPIR) into a full-fledged university over a period of five to ten years.

=== Creation of university ===
On 1 December 1984, after a long struggle by the pro-autonomy groups in Goa, the Law of the Goa University was signed, which unlinked the CPIR from Mumbai University, and converted it into the Goa University (GU). The aforementioned law extended the performance of GU to the territories of Daman and Diu and Dadra and Nagar Haveli, which in practice never occurred.

It moved to its present 175-hectare (430-acre) campus on the Taleigao Plateau.

== Campus ==
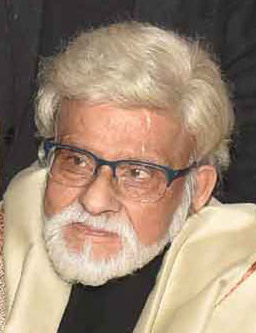
Satish Gujaral, who designed the Goa University.

The main campus of Goa University was designed by painter, sculptor, muralist, graphic designer and architect Satish Gujral. The university is built on the Taleigão plateau and located about 7 kilometres (4.3 mi) away from the center of the state capital Panaji.

== Organisation and administration ==
=== Governance ===
Statutory bodies of the university include the university court, executive council, planning board, academic Council and finance committee.

=== Affiliated colleges ===
Goa University, Goa's only university, is a university of affiliated colleges. 53 affiliated colleges: 29 in general education 24 professional education Enrollment ~27,000, mostly for undergraduate studies

Main Campus primarily for post-graduate studies Enrolment ~1,500

=== Recognised institutions ===
Recognised institutions functioning with Goa University recognition are:

- National Centre for Antarctic and Ocean Research, Vasco
- Directorate of Archives, Panaji
- National Institute of Oceanography, Dona Paula
- Xavier Centre of Historical Research, Porvorim
- Malaria Research Centre, Panaji
- Thomas Stephens Konkkni Kendr, Porvorim
- Fishery Survey of India, Mormugao
- All India Institute of Local Self Government, Panaji

== Academics ==
=== Rankings ===
University rankings

General – India
- NIRF (Universities) (2023): 101-150

The National Institutional Ranking Framework (NIRF) ranked Goa University in the 101–150 rank band among universities in India

=== Goa University Library ===
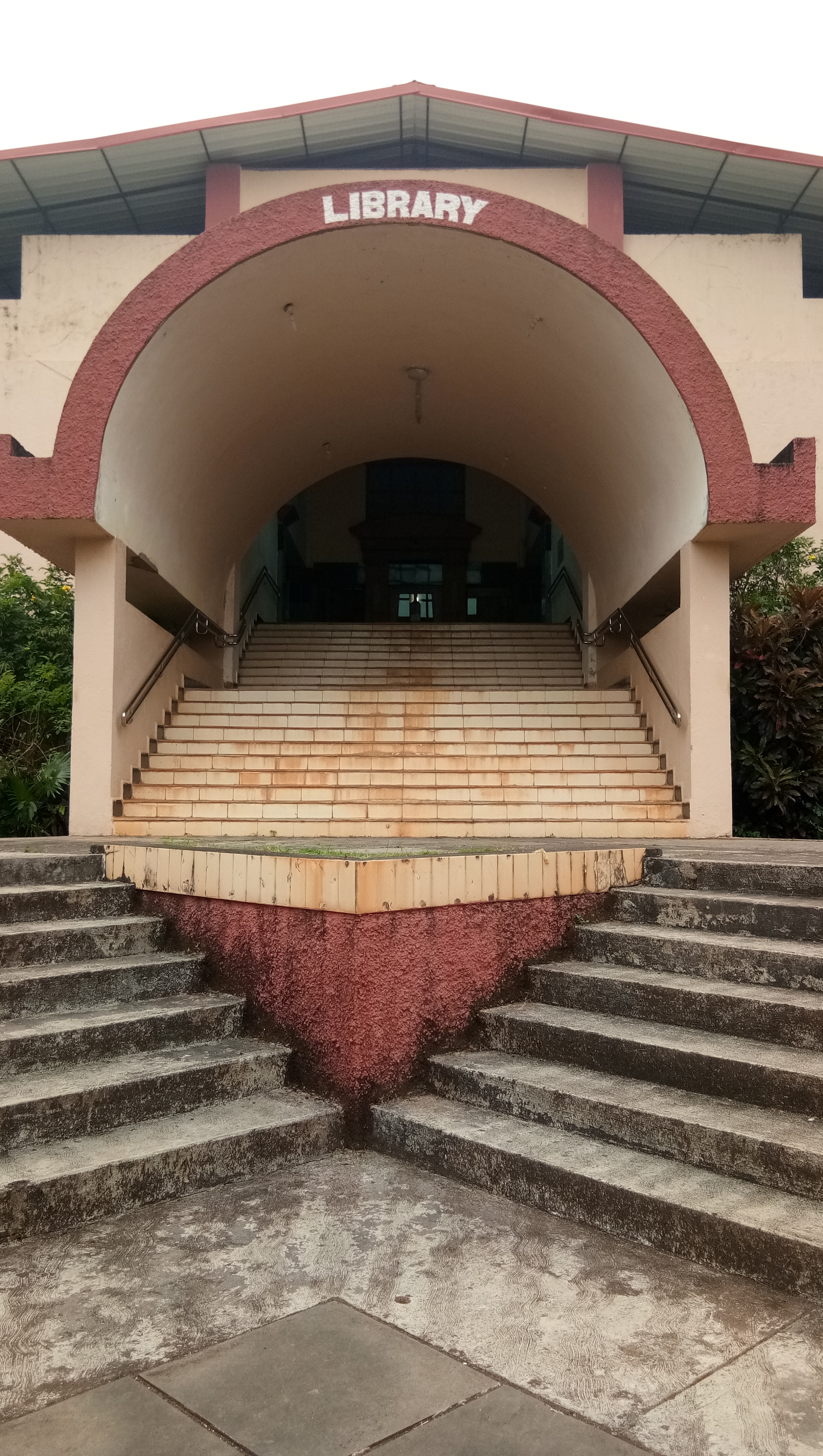
Entrance to the Goa University library.

Established in 1958 based on the collection of the Centre for Post Graduate Instruction and Research, University of Bombay, the university library holds more than 158,000 books. It subscribes to 350 periodicals. It is the repository of several collection of rare books including a collection on Indo-Portuguese history and culture donated by Pandurang Pissurlekar.

=== Visiting Research Professors Programme ===
University campus.

The Directorate of Art & Culture, Government of Goa, has funded and established six Visiting Research Professorship Chairs at the university. The first chair was set up in 2007 in memory of D. D. Kosambi during his birth centenary but it remained unoccupied until 2013. Subsequently, chairs were set up in honour of Balakrishna Bhagwant Borkar and Dayanand Bandodkar in 2010 and 2011 respectively, to commemorate their birth centenaries. In 2012, three more chairs were instituted in honour of Mario Miranda, Anthony Gonsalves and Nana Shirgaonkar. In 2014, the Sant Sohirobanath Ambiye in Marathi language and literature was established as a part of tercentenary birth anniversary celebrations of the Goan poet and saint. The Joaquim Heliodoro da Cunha Rivara Chair in Portuguese Studies and Indo-Portuguese Comparative Studies was established in 2016.

The complete list of Chairs at the university is as under:

- The Damodar Dharmananda Kosambi Visiting Research Professorship in Interdisciplinary Studies
- The Dayanand Bandodkar Visiting Research Professorship in Political Economy
- The Bakibab Borkar Visiting Research Professorship in Comparative Literature
- The Mario Miranda Visiting Research Professorship in Fine Art, Painting, Illustrative Cartooning, etc.
- The Anthony Gonsalves Visiting Research Professorship in Western Music
- The Nana Shirgaonkar Visiting Research Professorship in Traditional Music
- Sant Sohirobinath Ambiye Chair in Marathi language and literature
- Joaquim Heliodoro da Cunha Rivara Chair in Portuguese Studies and Indo-Portuguese Comparative Studies

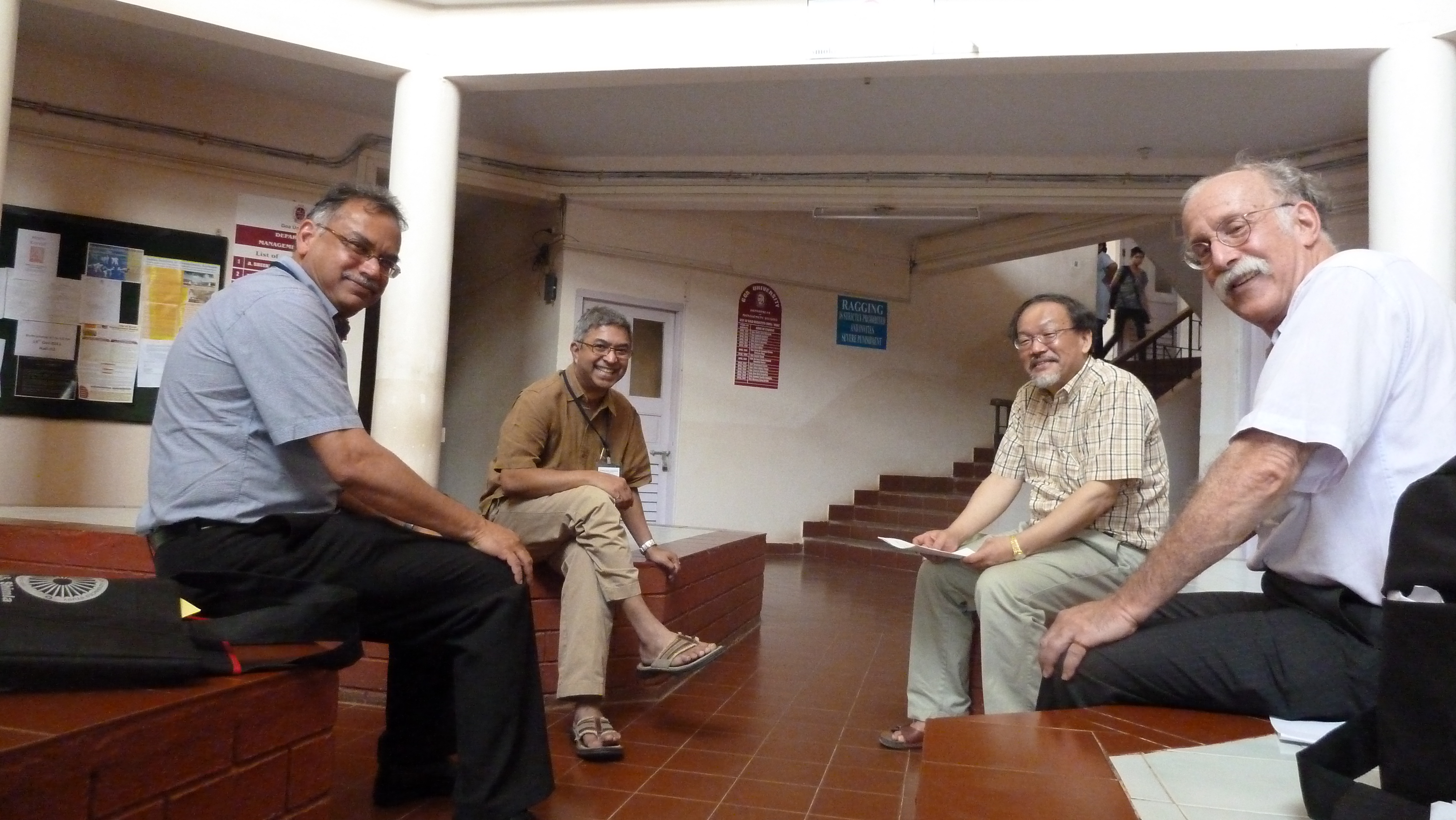
International scholars at a Goa University conference, 2011.

Those who have been appointed to these Chairs include Romila Thapar, Madhav Gadgil, Sudhir Kakar, Meghnad Desai, Baron Desai, Shubha Mudgal, Githa Hariharan, Vidya Dehejia, Saurabh Dube, Ishita Banerjee-Dube, Kumkum Roy, etc. .

== Sports ==
Dr Shyama Prasad Mukherjee Indoor Stadium is an indoor stadium located on the campus of Goa University. The stadium was constructed for the 2014 Lusophony Games for events of volleyball and basketball. The stadium is named after Dr Shyama Prasad Mukherjee, the founder of Bhartiya Jana Sangh and former Indian politician. The stadium has a seating capacity of 4,000 and was inaugurated by Governor of Goa Bharat Vir Wanchoo in 2014. It cost 82 crore and was built in 11 months which is a record for the construction of an indoor stadium of international standard. With a 131-metre (430 ft) sheet, the stadium is Asia's first stadium which has the longest single-sheet roof.

== Notable alumni and staff ==
- Nishtha Desai, scholar and author
- Olivinho Gomes, Konkani scholar and winner of Sahitya Akademi award for Translation in 1993
- Sidharth Kuncalienker, politician, former MLA of Panjim
- Vishwajit Rane, politician, Health Minister of Goa
- Manoj Parab, politician and activist
