= Elections in Goa =

The Portuguese ruled territories of Goa, Daman and Diu were annexed through Operation Vijay into the Republic of India on 19 December 1961. Since then, elections in the state are conducted in accordance with the Constitution of India to elect representatives of various bodies on national, state and district levels.

== Lok Sabha Elections ==
Lok Sabha constituencies of Goa since 2008 Delimitation

Goa has two Lok Sabha constituencies; North Goa and South Goa, none of which are reserved for Scheduled Castes or Scheduled Tribes.

Keys: Bharatiya Janata Party (BJP) Indian National Congress (INC)

No.	Constituency	1999 elections		2004 elections		2009 elections		2014 elections		2019 elections		2024 elections	
No.	Constituency	MP	Party	MP	Party	MP	Party	MP	Party	MP	Party	MP	Party
1	North Goa	Shripad Naik	BJP	Shripad Naik	BJP	Shripad Naik	BJP	Shripad Naik	BJP	Shripad Naik	BJP	Shripad Naik	BJP
2	South Goa	Ramakant Angle	BJP	Churchill Alemao	INC	Francisco Sardinha	INC	Narendra Sawaikar	BJP	Francisco Sardinha	INC	Viriato Fernandes	INC

== Legislative Assembly Elections ==
The Goa Legislative Assembly has 40 constituencies of which only one is reserved for Scheduled Caste.

Summary of MLAs elected to the Goa Legislative Assembly
Parties	Seats won							
Parties	1989	1994	1999	2002	2007	2012	2017	2022
Bharatiya Janata Party (BJP)	0	4	10	17	14	21	13	20
Indian National Congress (INC)	20	18	21	16	16	9	17	11
Maharashtrawadi Gomantak Party (MAG)	18	12	4	2	2	3	3	2
Aam Aadmi Party (AAP)	–	–	–	–	–	–	0	2
Goa Forward Party (GFP)	–	–	–	–	–	–	3	1
Revolutionary Goans Party (RGP)	–	–	–	–	–	–	–	1
Save Goa Front (SGF)	–	–	–	–	2	–	–	–
Goa Rajiv Congress Party (GRCP)	–	–	2	–	–	–	–	–
Goa Vikas Party (GVP)	–	–	0	0	–	2	0	–
Nationalist Congress Party (NCP)	–	–	–	1	3	0	1	0
United Goans Democratic Party (UGDP)	–	3	2	3	1	0	–	–
Independents (IND)	2	3	1	1	2	5	3	3
Total	40	40	40	40	40	40	40	40
