= 2014 Indian general election in Goa =

- April–May 2014

2 seats
- Turnout: 77.06% ▲

	First party	Second party
Party	BJP	INC
Alliance	NDA	UPA
Last election	1 seat	1 seat
Seats won	2	0
Seat change	▲1	▼1
Percentage	53.19	36.62
- Seatwise Result Map of the 2014 general election in Goa
Prime Minister before election
Manmohan Singh
INC
Prime Minister after election
Narendra Modi
BJP

The 2014 Indian general election in Goa for two Lok Sabha seats was held in a single phase. Bharatiya Janata Party (BJP) swept the state by winning both the seats.

== Nominations ==
A total of 24 candidates (22 men and 2 women) filed nominations with the Election Commission of India (ECI). Among these, four nominations (men) were rejected by the ECI while one candidate (men) withdrew. This resulted in 19 candidates (17 men and 2 women) contesting elections.

== Parties and alliances ==
=== National Democratic Alliance ===
Party	Flag	Symbol	Leader	Seats contested
Bharatiya Janata Party			Shripad Naik	2

=== United Progressive Alliance ===
Party	Flag	Symbol	Leader	Seats contested
Indian National Congress			Francisco Sardinha	2

== Results ==
Bharatiya Janata Party (BJP) swept the state by winning both the seats.

Out of total 19 candidates contesting, deposits of 15 candidates (13 men and 2 women) were forfeited for failing to secure more than one-sixth (16.7%) of the total valid votes cast.

Party Name	Popular vote			Seats		
Party Name	Votes	%	±pp	Contested	Won	+/−
BJP	4,36,679	54.12	▲8.67	2	2	▲1
INC	2,98,750	37.02	▲13.97	2	0	▼1
AAP	27,103	3.32	New entry	2	0	Steady
AITC	11,941	1.46	Steady	1	0	Steady
CPI	10,077	1.25	Steady	2	0	Steady
Others	5,195	0.16	Steady	4	0	Steady
IND	17,152	2.13	Steady	6	0	Steady
NOTA	10,103	1.24	Steady			
Total	8,17,000	100%	-	19	2	-

== List of elected MPs ==
Constituency		Winner				Runner Up				Margin	%
#	Name	Candidate	Party	Votes	%	Candidate	Party	Votes	%	Margin	%
1	North Goa	Shripad Naik	BJP	2,37,903	58.51	Ravi Naik	INC	1,32,304	32.54	1,05,599	25.98
2	South Goa	Narendra Sawaikar	BJP	1,98,776	48.44	Aleixo Lourenco	INC	1,66,446	40.56	32,330	7.88

== Post-election Union Council of Ministers from Goa ==
#	Name	Constituency	Designation	Department	From	To	Party
1	Shripad Yesso Naik	North Goa (Lok Sabha)	MoS (I/C); MoS	MoS (I/C): Culture and Tourism (27 May 2014 - 9 Nov 2014) MoS (I/C): AYUSH (9 Nov 2014 - 25 May 2019); MoS: Health and Family Welfare (9 Nov 2014 - 5 July 2016)	27 May 2014	25 May 2019	BJP

== Committee member in Lok Sabha ==
#	Name	Constituency	Department	From	To	Party
1	Narendra Sawaikar	South Goa (Lok Sabha)	Member, Committee on Subordinate Legislation (01 Sep 2014 - 25 May 2019) Member, Committee on Public Undertakings; Member, Consultative Committee, Ministry of Road Transport and Highways and Shipping; Member, Standing Committee on Commerce (01 May 2016 - 25 May 2019)	27 May 2014	25 May 2019	BJP

== Assembly Segment wise lead ==
Party	Assembly segments	Position in Assembly (as of 2017 election)
Bharatiya Janata Party	33	13
Indian National Congress	7	17
Others	0	10
Total	40	
