= Nilesh Cabral =

Indian politician (born 1972)

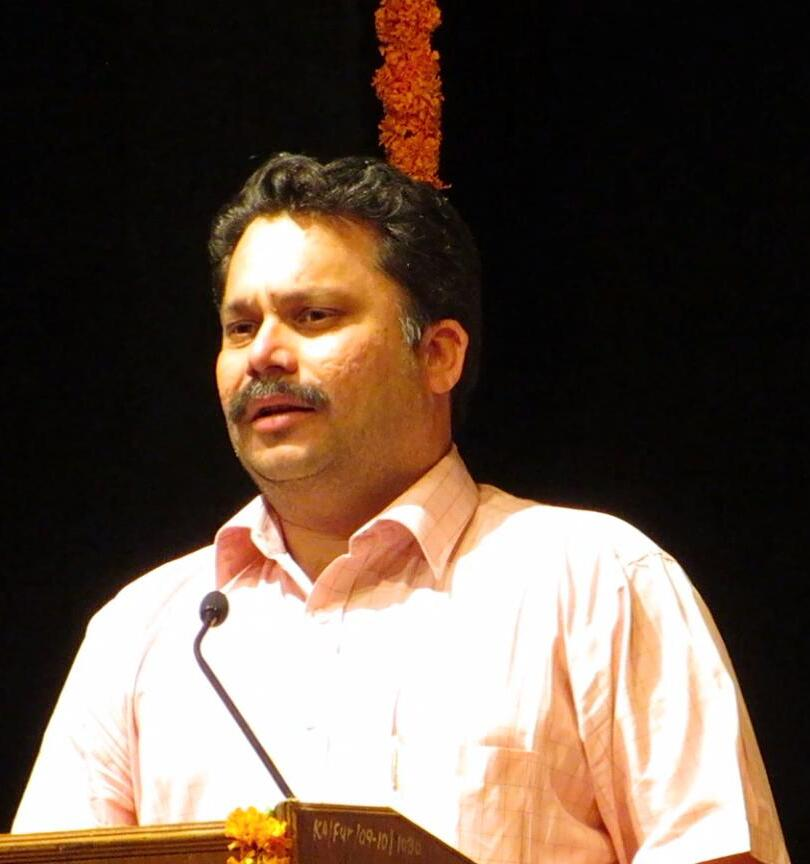
- Cabral in 2013

Minister of Power Government of Goa
- In office 24 September 2018 - 19 November 2023
- Chief Minister: Manohar Parrikar; Pramod Sawant
- Preceded by: Pandurang Madkaikar

Minister of Non-Conventional Energy Government of Goa
- In office 24 September 2018 - 19 November 2023
- Chief Minister: Manohar Parrikar; Pramod Sawant
- Preceded by: Pandurang Madkaikar

Minister of Law & Judiciary Government of Goa
- Chief Minister: Manohar Parrikar
- Preceded by: Francis D'Souza

Minister of Legislative Affairs Government of Goa
- In office 24 September 2018 - 15 March 2022
- Preceded by: Francis D'Souza

Chairman Goa Tourism Development Corporation
- In office April 2017 – 7 November 2018
- Preceded by: Nilesh Cabral
- Succeeded by: Dayanand Sopte

Chairman Goa Tourism Development Corporation
- In office 24 April 2012 – 9 January 2017
- Preceded by: Shyam Satardekar
- Succeeded by: Nilesh Cabral

Member of Legislative Assembly
- Incumbent
- Assumed office 16 March 2017
- Preceded by: Nilesh Cabral
- Constituency: Curchorem

Member of Legislative Assembly
- In office 7 March 2012 – 2017
- Preceded by: Shyam Satardekar
- Succeeded by: Nilesh Cabral
- Constituency: Curchorem

President, Goa Chess Association
- Incumbent
- Assumed office June 2017
- Preceded by: Vinay Tendulkar

Personal details
- Born: 10 July 1970 (age 56)
- Party: Bharatiya Janata Party
- Education: Government Polytechnic, Panaji
- Profession: Engineer

Nilesh Joao Cabral (born 10 July 1972) is an Indian politician and a former cabinet minister in the Government of Goa headed by Manohar Parrikar. He is a member of the Bharatiya Janata Party and represents the Curchorem constituency in the Goa Legislative Assembly. Cabral had held the portfolios of Power, Non-Conventional Energy, Law & Judiciary as well as Legislative Affairs.

== Personal life ==
Nilesh Joao Cabral was born on 10 July 1972 to Joao Cabral. An engineer, Cabral earned a Diploma in Mining and Mine Surveying from the Government Polytechnic, Panaji in 1992.

By profession, Cabral is a transport contractor as well as barge owner. He owns several trucks and earth moving machines. He is the Chairman of the Goa Chess Association since June 2017.

Cabral is a practising Catholic.

== Career ==
Cabral was once a close confidante of Shyam Satardekar and also worked for the latter's victory in the 2007 Goa Legislative Assembly election. But later, differences arose between Satardekar and Cabral. Cabral first contested the 2012 Goa Legislative Assembly election from Curchorem as a candidate of the Bharatiya Janata Party, defeating Shyam Satardekar of the Indian National Congress. In 2012, Cabral was seen as an "outsider" as he did not belong to the Rashtriya Swayamsevak Sangh cadre. After his victory in the 2012 Goa Legislative Assembly election, Nilesh Cabral was appointed the Chairman of the Goa Tourism Development Corporation. He served in this position from 24 April 2012 to 9 January 2017.

He successfully contested the 2017 Goa Legislative Assembly election and was elected from the Curchorem constituency as a Bharatiya Janata Party candidate. He was once again appointed the Chairman of the Goa Tourism Development Corporation in April 2017 and held the post till 7 November 2018.

Since 24 September 2018, Cabral is the Cabinet Minister of Power, Non-Conventional Energy, Law & Judiciary as well as Legislative Affairs in the Government of Goa.

In 2020, Cabral said that he was ready to debate with his Delhi counterpart over the electricity models in their respective jurisdictions, and not with an official of the Delhi Jal Board. Raghav Chadha traveled from Delhi to Goa to debate; however, later on, the debate took place between Valmiki Naik and Nilesh Cabral In 2022, Cabral won the assembly election on BJP ticket from Curchorem constituency.

Nilesh Cabral has resigned from the Pramod Sawant-led state cabinet 19 November 2023.
