= 2009 Indian general election in Goa =

Indian General Election in Goa 2009

- April–May 2009

2 seats
- Turnout: 55.29%
	First party	Second party
	UPA	NDA
Party	UPA	NDA
Seats won	1	1
Seat change	Steady	Steady
Percentage	22.60%	44.78%
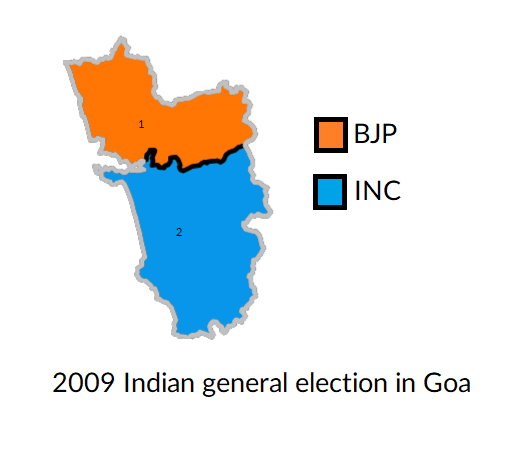
- 2009 Indian general election in Goa
Prime Minister before election
Manmohan Singh
INC
Prime Minister after election
Manmohan Singh
INC

The 2009 Indian general election were held for two seats in Goa. Both the alliances, namely, United Progressive Alliance (UPA) and National Democratic Alliance (NDA) won one seat each.

== Nominations ==
A total of 24 candidates (22 men and 2 women) filed nominations with the Election Commission of India (ECI). Among these, six nominations (men) were rejected by the ECI. None of the candidates withdrew. This resulted in 18 candidates (16 men and 2 women) contesting elections.

== Parties and alliances ==
=== National Democratic Alliance ===
Party	Flag	Symbol	Leader	Seats contested
Bharatiya Janata Party			Shripad Naik	2

=== United Progressive Alliance ===
Party	Flag	Symbol	Leader	Seats contested
Indian National Congress			Francisco Sardinha	1
Nationalist Congress Party			Mickky Pacheco	1

== List of candidates ==
Constituency					
Constituency		UPA		NDA	
1	North Goa	NCP	Jitendra Raghuraj Deshprabhu	BJP	Shripad Yesso Naik
2	South Goa	INC	Francisco Sardinha	BJP	Narendra Keshav Sawaikar

== Results ==
Both the alliances shared each seat. Out of total 18 candidates contesting, deposits of 14 candidates (12 men and 2 women) were forfeited for failing to secure more than one-sixth (16.7%) of the total valid votes cast.

=== Results by party/alliance ===
Alliance/ Party		Popular vote			Seats		
Alliance/ Party		Votes	%	±pp	Contested	Won	+/−
UPA	INC	1,27,494	22.60	▼7.16	1	1	Steady
UPA	NCP	1,31,363	23.28	▲7.24	1	0	Steady
UPA	Total	2,58,857	45.88	▲0.08	2	1	Steady
BJP		2,52,694	44.78	▼2.05	2	1	Steady
Others		40,877	7.24	Steady	6	0	Steady
IND		11,827	2.10	▲0.48	8	0	Steady
Total		5,64,255	100%	-	18	2	-

=== Detailed results ===
Constituency		Winner				Runner-up				Margin	
Constituency		Candidate	Party	Votes	%	Candidate	Party	Votes	%	Votes	%
1	North Goa	Shripad Naik	BJP	1,37,716	47.12	Jitendra Raghuraj Deshprabhu	NCP	1,31,363	44.94	6,353	2.18
2	South Goa	Francisco Sardinha	INC	1,27,494	46.88	Narendra Sawaikar	BJP	1,14,978	42.28	12,516	4.60

== Assembly-segment wise lead ==
Party	Assembly segments	Position in Assembly (as of 2012 election)
Bharatiya Janata Party	18	21
Indian National Congress	12	9
Nationalist Congress Party	10	0
Others	0	10
Total	40	
