= 2019 Indian general election in Goa =

Indian lower house election in Goa

- 23 April 2019

2 seats
- Turnout: 75.14% (▼1.92%)
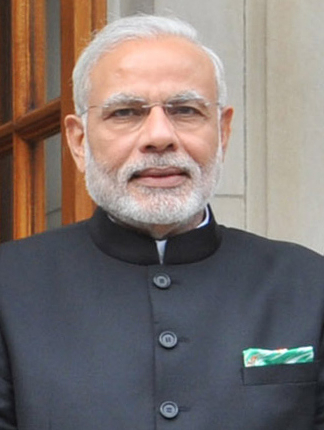

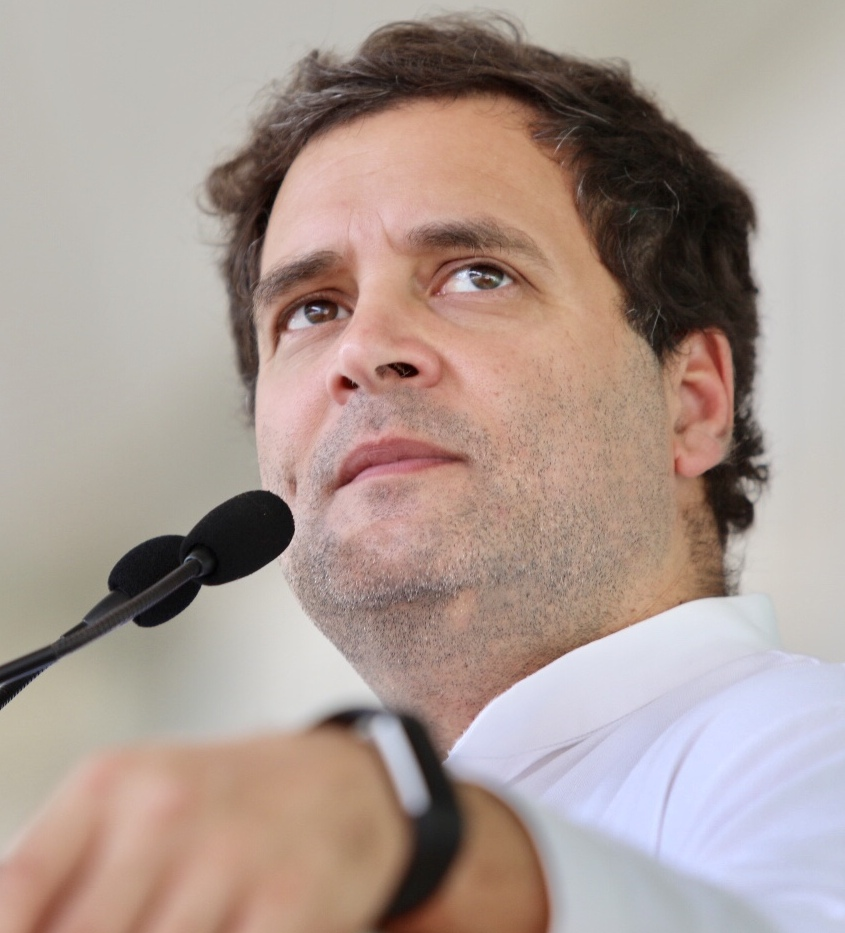

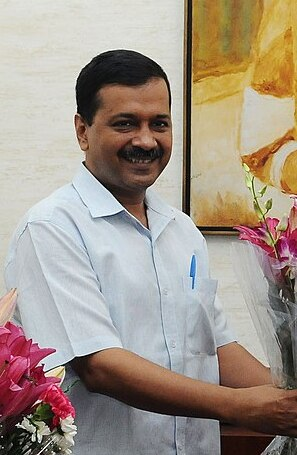
| | First party | Second party | Third party |
|---|---|---|---|
| Leader | Narendra Modi | Rahul Gandhi | Arvind Kejriwal |
| Party | BJP | INC | AAP |
| Alliance | NDA | UPA |
| Last election | 2 | 0 | 0 |
| Seats won | 1 | 1 | 0 |
| Seat change | ▼1 | ▲1 | Steady |
| Percentage | 51.19% | 42.92% | 3.01% |
| Swing | ▼2% | ▲6.3% | ▲3% |
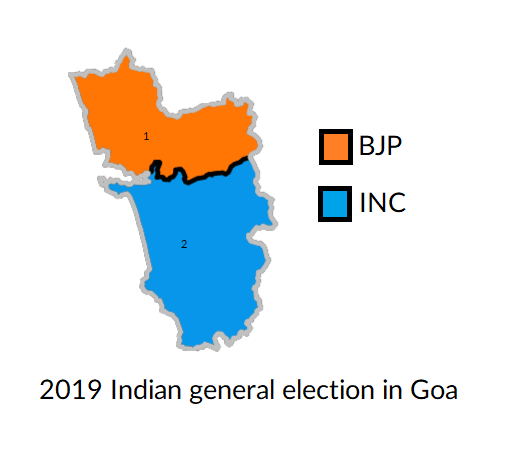
- 2019 Indian general election in Goa
Prime Minister before election
Narendra Modi
BJP
Prime Minister after election
Narendra Modi
BJP

The 2019 Indian general election was held in India between April and May 2019 to constitute the 17th Lok Sabha.

== Parties and alliances ==
=== National Democratic Alliance ===
| Party | Flag | Symbol | Leader | Seats contested |
|---|---|---|---|---|
| Bharatiya Janata Party | | | Shripad Naik | 2 |

=== United Progressive Alliance ===
| Party | Flag | Symbol | Leader | Seats contested |
|---|---|---|---|---|
| Indian National Congress | | | Francisco Sardinha | 2 |

=== Others ===
| Party | Flag | Symbol | Leader | Seats contested |
|---|---|---|---|---|
| Aam Aadmi Party | | | Arvind Kejriwal | 2 |

== Candidates ==
| Constituency | | | | | | | |
| Constituency | | NDA | | UPA | | AAP | |
| 1 | North Goa | BJP | Shripad Naik | INC | Girish Chodankar | AAP | Dattatray Padgoankar |
| 2 | South Goa | BJP | Narendra Sawaikar | INC | Francisco Sardinha | AAP | Elvis Gomes |

== Results ==
=== Results by Party ===
| Party Name | Popular vote | | | Seats | | |
| Party Name | Votes | % | ±pp | Contested | Won | +/− |
|---|---|---|---|---|---|---|
| BJP | 4,36,650 | 51.18 | ▼2.27 | 2 | 1 | ▼1 |
| INC | 3,66,158 | 42.92 | ▲6.35 | 2 | 1 | ▲1 |
| AAP | 25,647 | 3.01 | ▼0.31 | 2 | 0 | Steady |
| Others | 4,572 | 0.54 | Steady | 2 | 0 | Steady |
| IND | 7,677 | 0.45 | ▼1.65 | 4 | 0 | Steady |
| NOTA | 12,499 | 1.46 | ▲0.22 | 2 | Steady | Steady |
| Total | 8,53,203 | 100% | - | 12 | 2 | - |

=== Detailed Results ===
| Constituency | | Winner | | | | Runner-up | | | | Margin | |
| Constituency | | Candidate | Party | Votes | % | Candidate | Party | Votes | % | Votes | % |
|---|---|---|---|---|---|---|---|---|---|---|---|
| 1 | North Goa | Shripad Naik | BJP | 2,44,844 | 57.12 | Girish Chodankar | INC | 1,64,597 | 38.40 | 80,247 | 18.72 |
| 2 | South Goa | Francisco Sardinha | INC | 2,01,561 | 47.47 | Narendra Sawaikar | BJP | 1,91,806 | 45.18 | 9,755 | 2.30 |

== Post-election Union Council of Ministers from Goa ==
| # | Name | Constituency | Designation | Department | From | To | Party |
|---|---|---|---|---|---|---|---|
| 1 | Shripad Yesso Naik | North Goa | MoS (I/C) | Ministry of AYUSH | 31 May 2019 | 7 July 2021 | BJP |
| 1 | Shripad Yesso Naik | North Goa | MoS | Ministry of Defence | 31 May 2019 | 7 July 2021 | BJP |
| 1 | Shripad Yesso Naik | North Goa | MoS | Ministry of Ports, Shipping and Waterways | 7 July 2021 | 9 June 2024 | BJP |
| 1 | Shripad Yesso Naik | North Goa | MoS | Ministry of Tourism | 7 July 2021 | 9 June 2024 | BJP |

== Assembly Segment wise leads ==
| Party | 2022 Vidhan Sabha Elections | | 2019 Vidhan Sabha wise | | Change |
| Party | Seats | Vote% | Seats | Vote% | Change |
|---|---|---|---|---|---|
| BJP | 20 | 32.5% | 26 | 51.2% | ▲7 |
| INC | 11 | 28.4% | 14 | 42.9% | ▼6 |
| AAP | 2 | 6.7% | 0 | 3.01% | |
