= Bharatiya Janata Party – Goa =

Goa affiliate of the Bharatiya Janata Party

- Abbreviation: BJP
- Leader: Pramod Sawant (Chief Minister)
- President: Damu G. Naik
- General Secretary: Satish Dhond
- Founder: Atal Bihari Vajpayee; Lal Krishna Advani; Murli Manohar Joshi; Nanaji Deshmukh; K. R. Malkani; Sikandar Bakht; Vijay Kumar Malhotra; Vijaya Raje Scindia; Bhairon Singh Shekhawat; Shanta Kumar; Ram Jethmalani; Jagannathrao Joshi
- Founded: 6 April 1980 (46 years ago)
- Headquarters: 3rd Floor, Navelkar Arcade, Dr. Atmaram Borkar Road, Panaji - 403 001 Goa
- Colours: Saffron
- ECI status: National Party
- Seats in Rajya Sabha: 1 / 1 (as of 2022)
- Seats in Lok Sabha: 1 / 2 (as of 2022)
- Seats in Goa Legislative Assembly: 27 / 40

Election symbol
- Lotus

Party flag

Website
- goa.bjp.org

Bharatiya Janata Party – Goa (BJP Goa) is the affiliate of Bharatiya Janata Party for the state of Goa. The party appointed Damu G. Naik as the president of BJP, Goa on 18 January 2025 who took over from Sadanand Tanavade. Pramod Sawant was sworn in as the Chief Minister of Goa on 19 March 2019, after the death of Manohar Parrikar.

== Electoral history ==
=== Legislative Assembly election ===
Year	Seats won	Seats contested	+/-	Voteshare (%)	+/- (%)	Outcome|-	Bharatiya Jana Sangh
Janata Party
1984	0 / 30	16	Steady	1.21%	▲1.21%	Opposition
1989	0 / 40	7	Steady	0.39%	▼0.82%	Opposition
1994	4 / 40	12	▲4	9.05%	▲8.66%	Opposition
1999	10 / 40	39	▲6	26.15%	▲17.1%	Opposition, later Government
2002	17 / 40	39	▲7	35.57%	▲9.42%	Government
2007	14 / 40	33	▼3	30.32%	▼5.25%	Opposition
2012	21 / 40	28	▲7	34.68%	▲4.36%	Government
2017	13 / 40	36	▼8	32.48%	▼2.2%	Government
2022	20 / 40	40	▲7	33.31%	▲0.83%	Government

=== Lok Sabha election ===
Year	Seats won	+/-	Outcome
1980	0 / 2	Steady	Opposition
1984	0 / 2	Steady	Opposition
1989	0 / 2	Steady	Outside support to National Front
1991	0 / 2	Steady	Opposition
1996	0 / 2	Steady	Government, later Opposition
1998	0 / 2	Steady	Government
1999	2 / 2	▲2	Government
2004	1 / 2	Steady	Opposition
2009	1 / 2	Steady	Opposition
2014	2 / 2	▲1	Government
2019	1 / 2	▼1	Government
2024	1 / 2	Steady	Government

== Leadership ==
=== Chief Minister ===
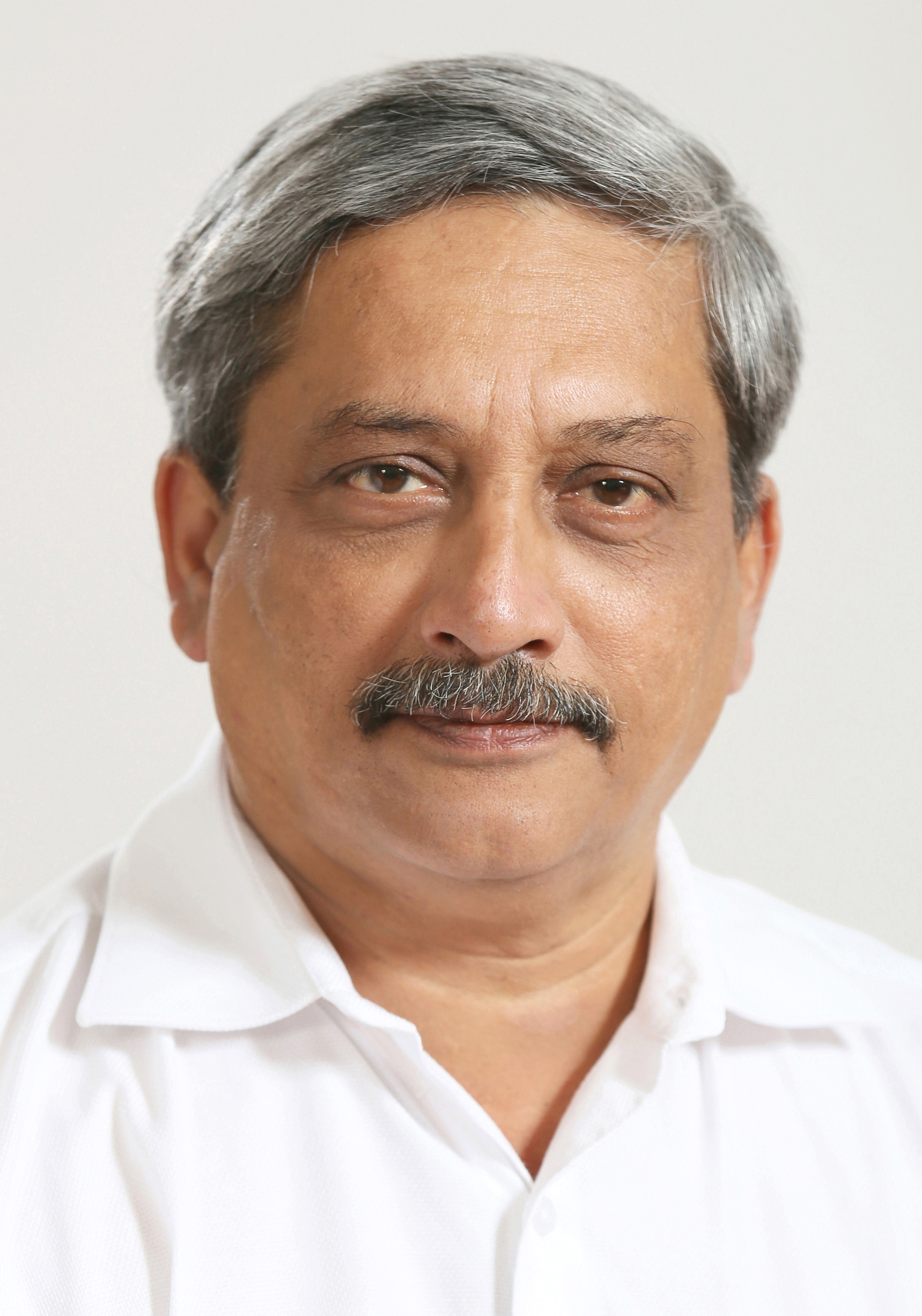
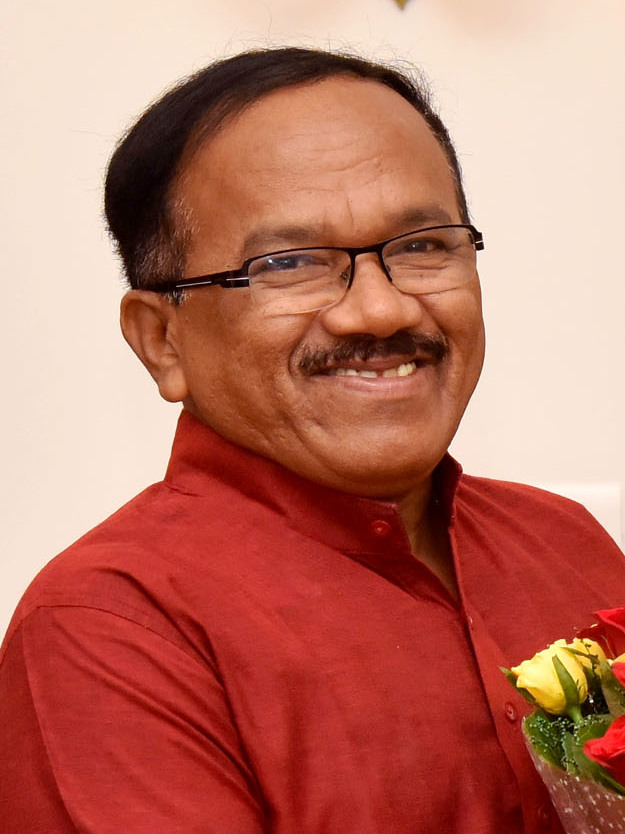
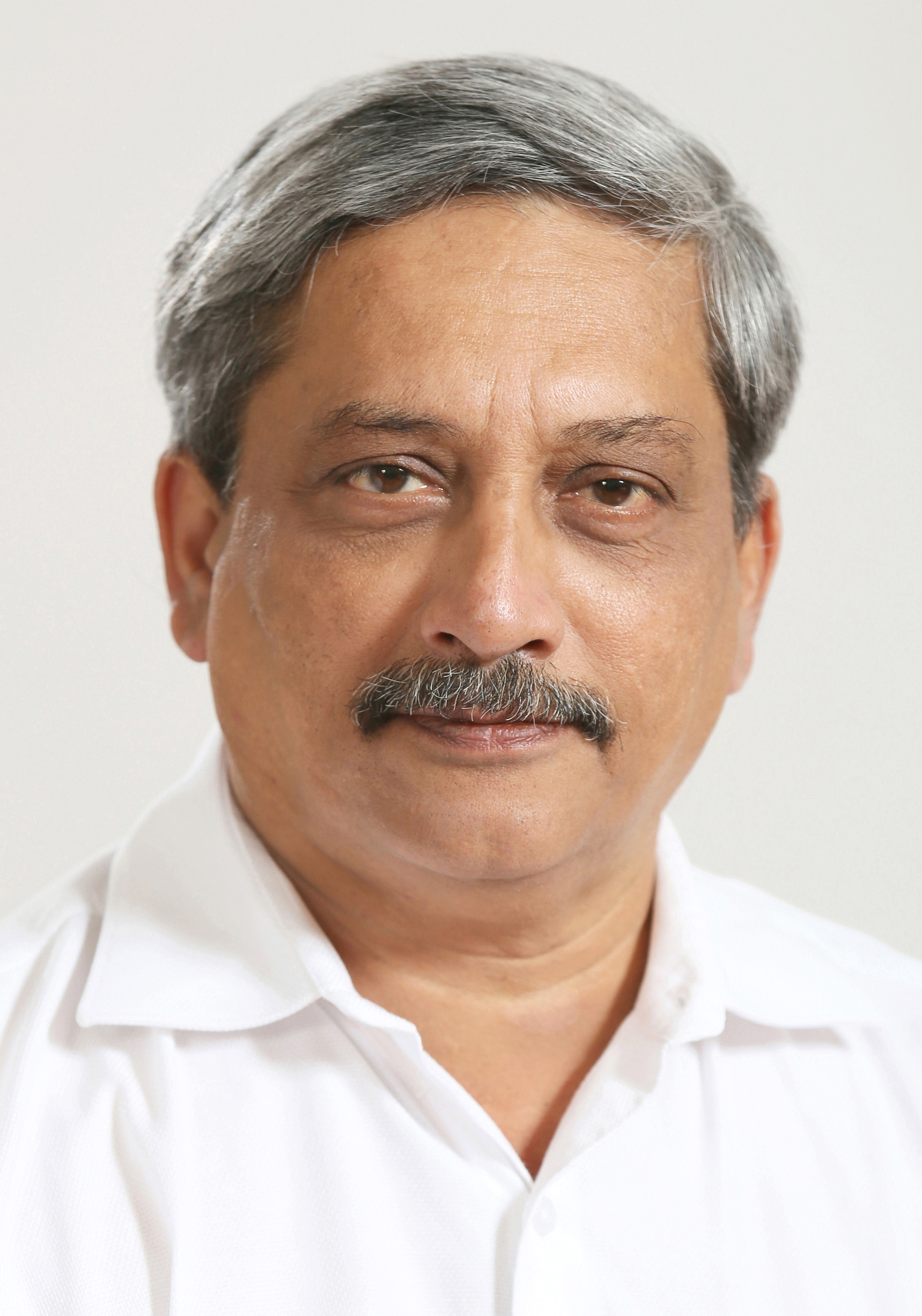
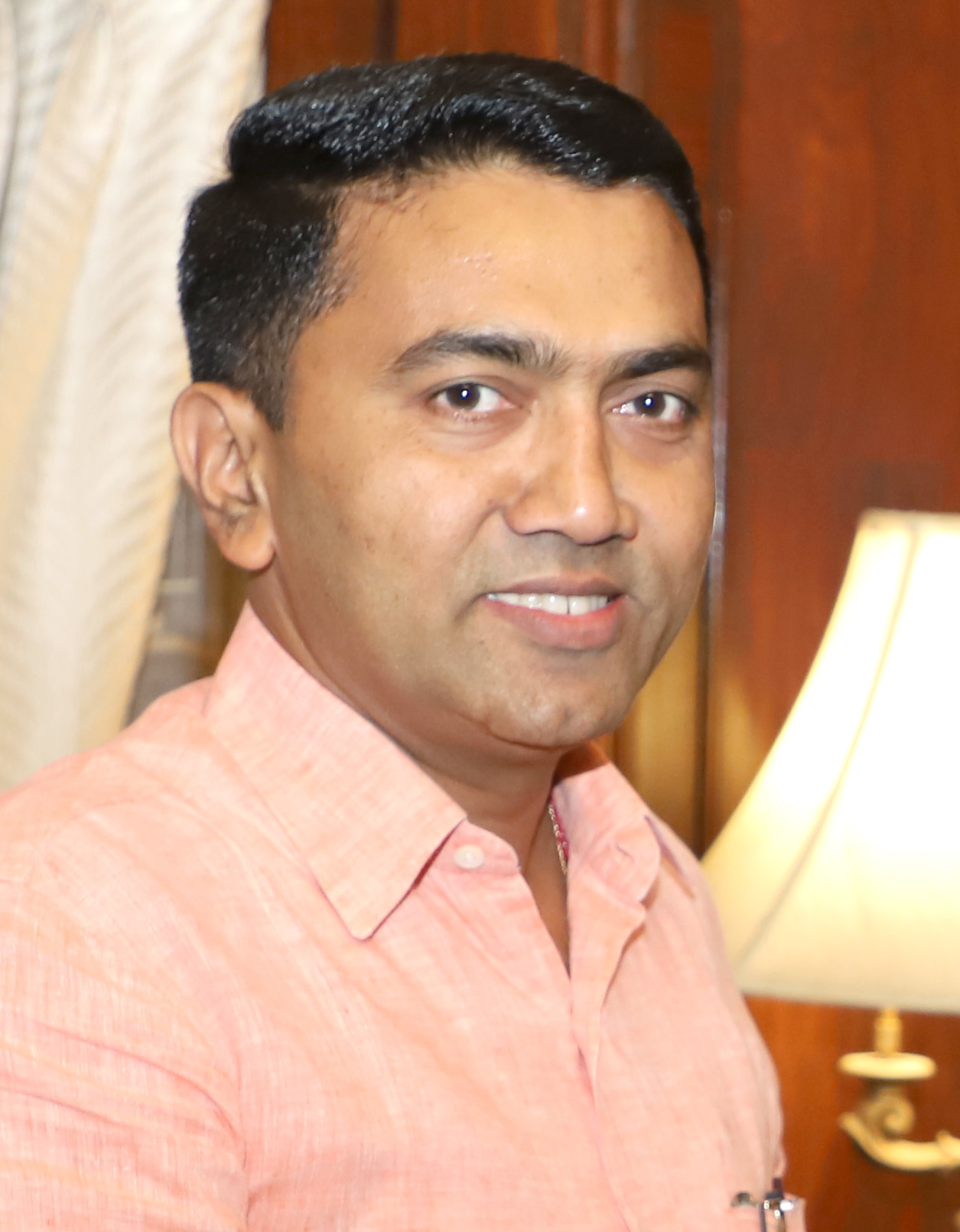
No	Portrait	Name	Constituency	Term of Office			Assembly
1		Manohar Parrikar	Panaji	24 October 2000	3 June 2002	1 year, 222 days	3rd
1		Manohar Parrikar	Panaji	3 June 2002	3 February 2005	2 years, 245 days	4th
1		Manohar Parrikar	Panaji	9 March 2012	8 November 2014	2 years, 244 days	6th
2		Laxmikant Parsekar	Mandrem	8 November 2014	14 March 2017	2 years, 126 days	6th
(1)		Manohar Parrikar	Panaji	14 March 2017	17 March 2019	2 years, 3 days	7th
3		Pramod Sawant	Sanquelim	19 March 2019	28 March 2022	3 years, 9 days	7th
3		Pramod Sawant	Sanquelim	28 March 2022	Incumbent	4 years, 196 days	8th

=== Deputy Chief Minister ===
#	Portrait	Name	Constituency	Term of Office			Chief Minister
1		Francis D'Souza	Mapusa	9 March 2012	14 March 2017	5 years, 5 days	Manohar Parrikar & Laxmikant Parsekar

=== Leader of the Opposition ===
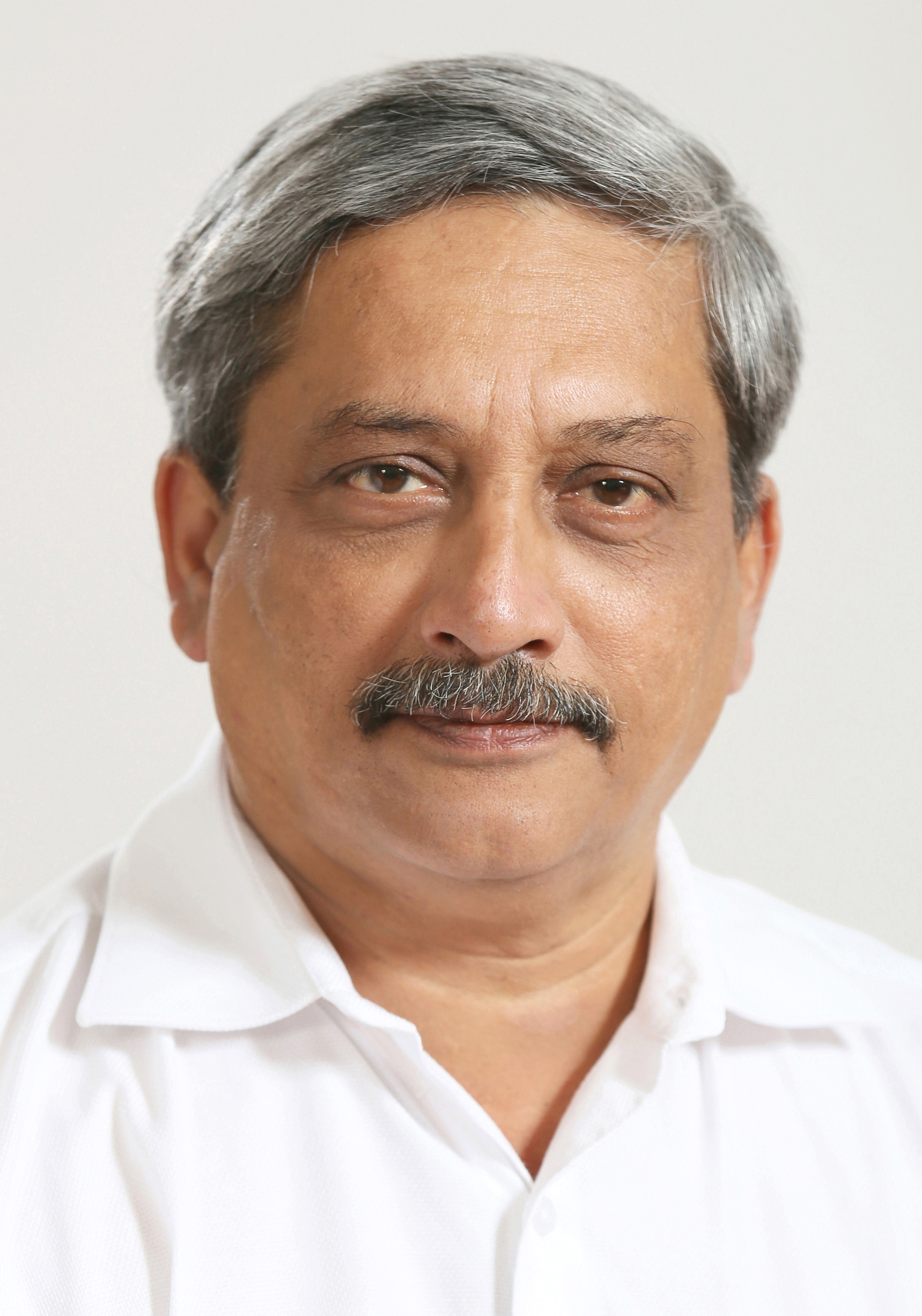
No	Portrait	Name	Constituency	Term of Office			Assembly	Chief Minister
1		Manohar Parrikar	Panaji	14 June 2005	5 June 2007	1 year, 356 days	4th	Pratapsingh Rane
1		Manohar Parrikar	Panaji	19 June 2007	6 March 2012	4 years, 261 days	5th	Digambar Kamat

=== President ===
No	Party leader	Period
1	Kashinath Parab	1980	1989	9 years
2	Vishwanath Arlekar	1989	1991	2 years
3	Shripad Naik	1991	1995	4 years
4	Suresh Amonkar	1995	2000	5 years
5	Laxmikant Parsekar	2000	2003	3 years
6	Rajendra Arlekar	2003	2007	4 years
(3)	Shripad Naik	2007	2010	3 years
(5)	Laxmikant Parsekar	2010	2012	2 years
7	Vinay Dinu Tendulkar	2012	2020	8 years
8	Sadanand Shet	2020	2025	5 years
9	Damu Naik	2025	Incumbent

== See also ==
- Bharatiya Janata Party
- Goa Legislative Assembly
- Maharashtrawadi Gomantak Party
- Bharatiya Janata Party – Gujarat
- Bharatiya Janata Party – Uttar Pradesh
- Bharatiya Janata Party – Madhya Pradesh
- State units of the Bharatiya Janata Party
