= Salgaocar =

Salgaocar may refer to:

- Clube de Salgaocar, football club
- Salgaocar FC, football club
- Salgaocar (surname), people with the surname Salgaocar
