= San Juje Da Areyal railway station =

Railway station in Goa, India

San Juje Da Areyal Railway Station

General information
- Location: Maina Tambetim, Curtorim, South Goa, Goa; India
- Coordinates: 15.2657°N 74.0108°E
- Elevation: 17 metres (56 ft)
- System: Indian Railways station
- Owner: Indian Railways
- Operator: South Western Railway zone
- Line: Guntakal–Vasco da Gama section
- Platforms: 1
- Tracks: 2
- Connections: Auto stand

Construction
- Structure type: Standard (on-ground station)
- Parking: No
- Cycle facilities: No

Other information
- Status: Construction – diesel-line doubling
- Station code: SJDA
- Zone(s): South Western Railway zone
- Division(s): Hubli

Services
Preceding station	Indian Railways	Following station
Madgaon Junction towards ?	South Western Railway zone Guntakal–Vasco da Gama section	Chandar towards ?
Location

San Juje Da Areyal Railway Station is a small railway station in South Goa district, Goa. Its code is SJDA. It serves Curtorim village. The station consists of one platform. The platform is now sheltered. Now it has facilities ilike water sanitation.

== Major trains ==
- Vasco da Gama–Kulem Passenger
