= Salgaocar (surname) =

Salgaocar is a surname. Notable people with the surname include:

- Anil Salgaocar (1940–2016), Indian businessman and politician
- V. M. Salgaocar (1916–1984), Indian businessman
