= Damu Naik =

Indian politician

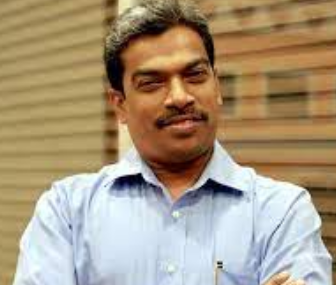

President, Bharatiya Janata Party, Goa
- Incumbent
- Assumed office 18 January 2025
- President: J. P. Nadda; Nitin Nabin
- Preceded by: Sadanand Shet Tanavade

Member of the Goa Legislative Assembly
- In office 2002–2012
- Preceded by: Luis Cardoz
- Succeeded by: Vijai Sardesai
- Constituency: Fatorda

Personal details
- Born: Damodar Gajanan Naik; 6 September 1971 (age 54) Margao, Goa, India
- Party: Bharatiya Janata Party
- Occupation: Politician & Actor
- Known for: Indian Politician, an Actor and producer of Konkani movies.

Damodar Gajanan "Damu" Naik (born 6 September 1971) is an Indian politician and associated with the Bharatiya Janata Party from the state of Goa. He serves as the current president of the state unit. He was the member for the Fatorda Assembly constituency of the Goa Legislative Assembly between 2002 and 2012 in the Cabinet of Manohar Parrikar.

== Early life and education ==
Damodar Naik was born on 6 September 1971 to Gajanan B. Naik and Laxmi G. Naik. He obtained a Bachelor of Arts from Goa University in 1994.

== Political career ==
He represented the Fatorda Assembly constituency for the Bharatiya Janata Party. He was elected to the Goa Legislative Assembly from the same constituency in the 2002 Goa Legislative Assembly election and the 2007 Goa Legislative Assembly election. He served as the National Executive Member of Bharatiya Janata Yuva Morcha in 2006. He contested for the Goa Legislative Assembly from Fatorda constituency in February 2022 as a member of Bharatiya Janata Party. and lost to Vijay Sardessai by 1527 votes.
