= Goa State Chess Association =

Chess organization in India

GOA CHESS ASSOCIATION (formerly Goa State Chess Association)
- Official logo of GSCA
- Abbreviation: GSCA
- Formation: 1977
- Type: Sports organisation
- Legal status: Association
- Purpose: Chess
- Headquarters: Goa
- Location: Around Goa
- Region served: Entire Goa
- Members: Affiliated Clubs and Academies
- Official language: English
- President: Vinay Tendulkar
- Affiliations: All India Chess Federation
- Staff: 17
- Website: Official Website

The Goa Chess Association (GSCA) is an association for the game of chess in Goa, India. It was formed in 1977 and is affiliated with the All India Chess Federation.

== History ==
In 1973 the All Goa Daman & Diu Chess Association was formed under the presidency of P. K. Dias, however, it became defunct. Then in 1977 a group of enthusiasts banding themselves together as Vasco Chess Association approached the State Council and revived the State Body with the presidency of Dr. R. V. Deo.

== Affiliates ==
- Bambolim Chess Club
- Mapusa Chess Club
- Cortalim Chess Club
- Jai Chess Club
- Margao Chess Club
- Porvorim Chess Club
- Curchorem Chess Club
- Vithalapur Chess Club
- Clube Desporto
- Panjim Gymkhana
- Super Sports Club

== Academy ==
- Kingshekhar Chess Academy Goa

== Events ==
Since its inception the GSCA has been regularly holding tournaments in all Categories of events announced by the All India Chess Federation and have been sending teams to the Nationals. It has also hosted 5 National Level Tournaments. Some of them are:

- National Sub - Junior (1983)
- National Junior (1984)
- A. N. Naik Memorial FIDE rated Open Chess Tournament (2000 & 2002)
- World Junior Chess Championship (2004)
- Hirabai Salgaoncar FIDE Rating (2006)
- GVM FIDE Rating 2011
- National Juniors 2011
