= Mohan Amshekar =

Indian politician (born 1955)

Member of Goa Legislative Assembly
- In office 1989–1994
- Preceded by: constituency established
- Succeeded by: Vishnu Prabhu
- Constituency: Sanvordem

Personal details
- Born: Mohan Amshekar; 14 February 1955 (age 71) Narsobawadi, Maharashtra, India
- Party: Maharashtrawadi Gomantak Party
- Spouse: Sunanda Amshekar
- Education: Government Primary School, Sancordem, Goa; Kamakshi High School, Shiroda; Damodar College of Commerce & Economics, Margao
- Committees: Advisory; Sports; Reception; Petitions; Rules; Public Accounts; Delegated Legislation

Mohan Anand Amshekar (born 14 February 1955) is an Indian politician. He is a former Member of the Goa Legislative Assembly, representing the Sanvordem Assembly constituency from 1989 to 1994. He was a member of the Maharashtrawadi Gomantak Party.

== Early and personal life ==
Mohan Anand Amshekar was born at Narsobawadi. He completed his primary studies at Government Primary School, Sancordem, Goa and finished his schooling from Kamakshi High School, Shiroda. He later went on to be a graduate from Damodar College of Commerce & Economics, Margao. He is married to Sunanda Amshekar and currently resides at Khadpabandh, Ponda.
