= John Fernandes (Indian politician) =

Indian politician

Member of Parliament, Rajya Sabha
- In office 29 September 1987 – 28 September 1993
- Preceded by: Office established
- Succeeded by: Himself
- Constituency: Goa
- In office 29 September 1993 – 28 September 1999
- Preceded by: Himself
- Succeeded by: Eduardo Faleiro
- Constituency: Goa

President, Goa Pradesh Congress Committee
- In office July 2013 – 7 October 2014
- Preceded by: Subhash Shirodkar
- Succeeded by: Luizinho Faleiro

John F. Fernandes is an Indian politician who was elected to the Upper House of the Indian Parliament, the Rajya Sabha, twice from 1987 to 1993 and 1993 to 1999. Fernandes is a member of the Indian National Congress Party. Both times he represented the state of Goa.
