= Vishnu Prabhu =

Indian politician and businessman (born 1955)

Member of Goa Legislative Assembly
- In office 1994–1999
- Preceded by: Mohan Amshekar
- Succeeded by: Vinay Dinu Tendulkar
- Constituency: Sanvordem

Personal details
- Born: Vishnu Gopal Prabhu; 12 August 1955 (age 71) Shigao-Collem, Goa, Portuguese India, Portuguese Empire
- Party: Shiv Sena
- Other political affiliations: Maharashtrawadi Gomantak Party (1994–1999)
- Spouse: Vishupriya Prabhu
- Education: Diploma in electrical supervisor
- Alma mater: Our Lady of Piety High School, Collem, Goa (S.S.C); Industrial training institute (1991)
- Occupation: Politician
- Profession: Businessperson
- Committees: Public undertakings

Vishnu Gopal Prabhu (born 12 August 1955) is an Indian politician and businessman. He is a former Member of the Goa Legislative Assembly representing the Sanvordem Assembly constituency from 1994 to 1999. He was a member of the Maharashtrawadi Gomantak Party.

== Early and personal life ==
Vishnu Gopal Prabhu was born at Shigao-Collem, Goa to Prabhu Gopal Vishnu. He completed his Secondary School Certificate from Our Lady of Piety High School, Collem, Goa in 1975. He is an alumnus of the Industrial Training Institute (1991). Prabhu also has a diploma in electrical supervisor.

He is married to Vishupriya Prabhu and currently resides at Turimaradwada, Shigao-Collem, Goa. Some of his hobbies include reading and social work. He has a special interest in agriculture.

== Career ==
Prior to contesting the Goa Legislative Assembly elections, Prabhu was elected as a panch of the Collem village panchayat from 1986 to 1995. He contested the 1994 Goa Legislative Assembly election from the Sanvordem Assembly constituency on the Maharashtrawadi Gomantak Party ticket and emerged victorious by defeating Indian National Congress candidate, Marathe Sadashiv Vaman.
