= Curchorem Assembly constituency =

Legislative Assembly constituency in Goa State, India

Coordinates: 15.242°N 74.114°E

Curchorem
- Constituency No. 37 for the Goa Legislative Assembly

Constituency details
- Country: India
- Region: Western India
- State: Goa
- District: South Goa
- Lok Sabha constituency: South Goa
- Established: 1963
- Total electors: 27,484
- Reservation: None

Member of Legislative Assembly
- 8th Goa Legislative Assembly
- Incumbent Nilesh Cabral
- Party: Bharatiya Janata Party

Curchorem Assembly constituency is one of the 40 Goa Legislative Assembly constituencies of the state of Goa in southern India. Curchorem is also one of the 20 constituencies falling under South Goa Lok Sabha constituency.

== Members of Legislative Assembly ==
Year	Member	Party
1963	Vittal Karmali	Maharashtrawadi Gomantak Party
1967	Abdul Razak	United Goans Party
1972	Anil Prabhu Dessai	Maharashtrawadi Gomantak Party
1989	Domnick Fernandes	Indian National Congress
1994	Domnick Fernandes	Indian National Congress
1999	Ramrao Dessai	Bharatiya Janata Party
2002	Ramrao Dessai	Bharatiya Janata Party
2007	Shyam Satardekar	Indian National Congress
2012	Nilesh Cabral	Bharatiya Janata Party
2017	Nilesh Cabral	Bharatiya Janata Party
2022	Nilesh Cabral	Bharatiya Janata Party

== Election results ==
=== 2027 Assembly election ===
2027 Goa Legislative Assembly election: Curchorem
Party	Candidate	Votes	%	±%
INC				
NDA				
NOTA	None of the above			
Majority				
Turnout				
gain from		Swing		

=== Assembly Election 2022 ===
2022 Goa Legislative Assembly election : Curchorem
Party	Candidate	Votes	%	±%
BJP	Nilesh Cabral	9,973	43.70	▼15.52
INC	Amit Patkar	9,301	40.75	▲27.93
RGP	Aditya Raut Dessai	2,103	9.21	New
AAP	Gabriel Fernandes	830	3.64	▼5.72
MGP	Vithoba Prabhu Dessai	313	1.37	New
NOTA	None of the Above	216	0.95	▼0.39
Margin of victory		672	2.94	▼39.00
Turnout		22,824	82.12	▼0.20
Registered electors		27,484		▲5.59
BJP hold		Swing	▼15.52	

=== Assembly Election 2017 ===
2017 Goa Legislative Assembly election : Curchorem
Party	Candidate	Votes	%	±%
BJP	Nilesh Cabral	12,830	59.21	▼12.87
GSM	Shyam Satardekar	3,742	17.27	New
INC	Rosario Mariano Fernandes	2,778	12.82	▼14.94
AAP	James Fernandes	2,028	9.36	New
NOTA	None of the Above	290	1.34	New
Margin of victory		9,088	41.94	▼2.38
Turnout		21,668	83.24	▼0.88
Registered electors		26,030		▲10.39
BJP hold		Swing	▼12.87	

=== Assembly Election 2012 ===
2012 Goa Legislative Assembly election : Curchorem
Party	Candidate	Votes	%	±%
BJP	Nilesh Cabral	14,299	72.09	▲28.69
INC	Shyam Satardekar	5,507	27.76	▼25.07
Margin of victory		8,792	44.32	▲34.88
Turnout		19,836	83.99	▲13.59
Registered electors		23,581		▼17.31
BJP gain from INC		Swing		

=== Assembly Election 2007 ===
2007 Goa Legislative Assembly election : Curchorem
Party	Candidate	Votes	%	±%
INC	Shyam Satardekar	10,628	52.84	▲9.25
BJP	Ramrao Dessai	8,729	43.40	▼9.85
Independent	Rumaldo D'Costa	201	1.00	New
JD(S)	Khandekar Abhay Shambhu	173	0.86	New
Independent	Gurudas Chandrakant Naik	133	0.66	New
Margin of victory		1,899	9.44	▼0.22
Turnout		20,115	70.32	▼2.83
Registered electors		28,519		▲13.62
INC gain from BJP		Swing	▼0.41	

=== Assembly Election 2002 ===
2002 Goa Legislative Assembly election : Curchorem
Party	Candidate	Votes	%	±%
BJP	Ramrao Dessai	9,806	53.25	▲6.45
INC	Domnick Fernandes	8,027	43.59	▼0.95
Independent	Prof. Naik Sudhakar Tepalu	296	1.61	New
NCP	Vaikunth Govind Gauns Dessai	183	0.99	New
Margin of victory		1,779	9.66	▲7.40
Turnout		18,415	73.31	▲6.73
Registered electors		25,101		▲2.46
BJP hold		Swing	▲6.45	

=== Assembly Election 1999 ===
1999 Goa Legislative Assembly election : Curchorem
Party	Candidate	Votes	%	±%
BJP	Ramrao Dessai	7,640	46.80	New
INC	Domnick Fernandes	7,271	44.54	▼4.83
UGDP	Diniz Patrick Domingo	580	3.55	New
MGP	Gauns Dessai Vallabh Sadashiv	428	2.62	New
SS	Naik Nandkumar Gana	355	2.17	New
Margin of victory		369	2.26	▼27.56
Turnout		16,324	66.43	▼3.49
Registered electors		24,499		▲6.16
BJP gain from INC		Swing	▼2.57	

=== Assembly Election 1994 ===
1994 Goa Legislative Assembly election : Curchorem
Party	Candidate	Votes	%	±%
INC	Domnic Fernandes	7,989	49.37	▼4.06
SS	Adv. Dessai Narayan Mahadev	3,163	19.55	New
UGDP	Diniz Luis Constancio	2,664	16.46	New
Independent	Naik Ashok Shanker	1,683	10.40	New
Independent	Naik Neel Rajaram	287	1.77	New
Margin of victory		4,826	29.82	▲20.70
Turnout		16,182	68.81	▼6.23
Registered electors		23,078		▲16.82
INC hold		Swing	▼4.06	

=== Assembly Election 1989 ===
1989 Goa Legislative Assembly election : Curchorem
Party	Candidate	Votes	%	±%
INC	Domnic Fernandes	8,059	53.43	New
MGP	Prabhu Desai Anil Hari	6,683	44.31	
JP	S. Desai Prakash Mahadeo	128	0.85	New
Margin of victory		1,376	9.12	▼2.04
Turnout		15,083	75.27	▲8.74
Registered electors		19,755		▲36.76
INC gain from MGP		Swing		

=== Assembly Election 1972 ===
1972 Goa, Daman and Diu Legislative Assembly election : Curchorem
Party	Candidate	Votes	%	±%
MGP	Anil Prabhu Dessai	4,055	41.52	New
UGP	Karmali B. Gopinath	2,965	30.36	
INC	Cota Carvalho	2,123	21.74	New
Independent	Jaswant Ganesh Naik	218	1.45	New
Independent	M. T. D Aquind	78	0.52	New
CPI(M)	Pereira Joao Pedro Joao	61	0.40	New
Independent	M Jose Joao Miguel	60	0.40	New
Margin of victory		1,090	11.16	▲9.61
Turnout		9,766	66.18	▼0.28
Registered electors		14,445		▲10.14
MGP gain from UGP		Swing	▲0.45	

=== Assembly Election 1967 ===
1967 Goa, Daman and Diu Legislative Assembly election : Curchorem
Party	Candidate	Votes	%	±%
UGP	Abdul Razak	3,657	41.08	New
MGP	N. X. G. Desai	3,519	39.53	New
Independent	F. S. Tony	658	7.39	New
Independent	S. D. Ramnath	340	3.82	New
Independent	D. A. Mahablu	143	1.61	New
Independent	P. M. Pedro	141	1.58	New
Independent	P. D. L. Dattu	78	0.88	New
Margin of victory		138	1.55	
Turnout		8,903	65.09	
Registered electors		13,115		
UGP win (new seat)				

== See also ==
- List of constituencies of the Goa Legislative Assembly
- South Goa district
