= List of Rajya Sabha members from Goa =

The list of current and past Rajya Sabha members from the Goa State. State elect 1 member for the term of 6 years and indirectly elected by the state legislators, since year 1987.

== List of all Rajya Sabha members from Goa state ==
represents current member

Name	Party	Term start	Term end	Term(s)	Notes
Sadanand Shet Tanavade	BJP	29-Jul-2023	28-Jul-2029	1	
Vinay Dinu Tendulkar	BJP	29-Jul-2017	28-Jul-2023	1	
Shantaram Naik	INC	29-Jul-2011	28-Jul-2017	2	
Shantaram Naik	INC	29-Jul-2005	28-Jul-2011	1	
Eduardo Faleiro	INC	29-Jul-1999	28-Jul-2005	1	
John F. Fernandez	INC	08-Jul-1993	07-Jul-1999	2	
John F. Fernandez	INC	08-Jul-1987	07-Jul-1993	1	
