= Sadanand Shet Tanavade =

Indian politician

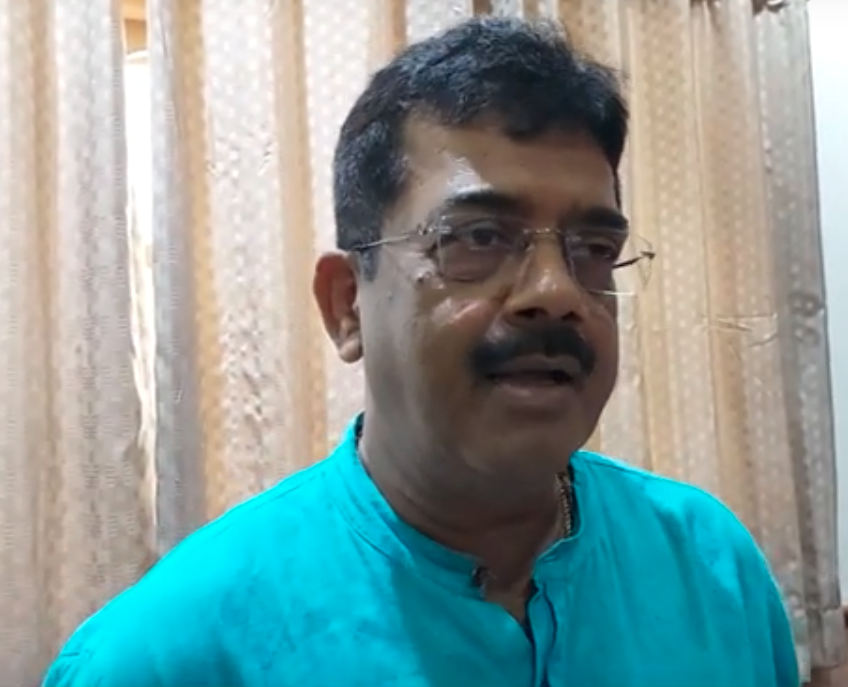
- Tanavade in 2023

Member of Parliament, Rajya Sabha
- Incumbent
- Assumed office 29 July 2023
- Preceded by: Vinay Tendulkar
- Constituency: Goa

President, Bharatiya Janata Party, Goa
- In office 12 January 2020 – 18 January 2025
- Preceded by: Vinay Tendulkar
- Succeeded by: Damu G. Naik

Member of Goa Legislative Assembly
- In office 2002–2007
- Preceded by: Dayanand Narvekar
- Succeeded by: Nilkanth Halarnkar
- Constituency: Thivim

Personal details
- Born: 31 January 1967 (age 59) Pirna, Goa, India
- Party: Bharatiya Janata Party
- Education: M.COM, Diploma in Marketing Management

Sadanand Shet Tanavade (born 31 January 1967) is an Indian politician who served as the president of Bharatiya Janata Party, Goa. He is a member of the Rajya Sabha, and a former Member of Legislative Assembly in the Goa Legislative Assembly from Thivim.
