= Fatorda Assembly constituency =

Legislative Assembly constituency in Goa State, India

Coordinates: 15.29°N 73.96°E

Fatorda
- Constituency No. 30 for the Goa Legislative Assembly

Constituency details
- Country: India
- Region: Western India
- State: Goa
- District: South Goa
- Lok Sabha constituency: South Goa
- Established: 1989
- Total electors: 30,845
- Reservation: None

Member of Legislative Assembly
- 8th Goa Legislative Assembly
- Incumbent Vijai Sardesai
- Party: GFP
- Alliance: INDIA
- Elected year: 2022

Fatorda Assembly constituency is one of the 40 Goa Legislative Assembly constituencies of the state of Goa in southern India. Fatorda is also one of the 20 constituencies falling under South Goa Lok Sabha constituency.

== Members of Legislative Assembly ==
Year	Member	Party
1989	Luis Cardoz	Indian National Congress
1994	Luis Cardoz	Indian National Congress
1999	Luis Cardoz	Indian National Congress
2002	Damodar Naik	Bharatiya Janata Party
2007	Damodar Naik	Bharatiya Janata Party
2012	Vijai Sardesai	Independent
2017	Vijai Sardesai	Goa Forward Party
2022	Vijai Sardesai	Goa Forward Party

== Election results ==
=== 2027 Assembly election ===
2027 Goa Legislative Assembly election: Fatorda
Party	Candidate	Votes	%	±%
INC				
NDA				
NOTA	None of the above			
Majority				
Turnout				
gain from		Swing		

=== Assembly Election 2022 ===
2022 Goa Legislative Assembly election : Fatorda
Party	Candidate	Votes	%	±%
GFP	Vijai Sardesai	11,063	45.47%	▼0.18
BJP	Damodar Naik	9,536	39.19%	▼0.67
RGP	Adv. Valerie Fernandes	1,556	6.39%	New
AAP	Sandesh Teleikar	1,050	4.32%	▼2.10
AITC	Seoula Vas	635	2.61%	New
NOTA	None of the Above	254	1.04%	▲0.09
Margin of victory		1,527	6.28%	▲0.48
Turnout		24,333	77.47%	▼0.59
Registered electors		30,845		▲6.42
GFP hold		Swing	▼0.18	

=== Assembly Election 2017 ===
2017 Goa Legislative Assembly election : Fatorda
Party	Candidate	Votes	%	±%
GFP	Vijai Sardesai	10,516	45.65%	New
BJP	Damodar Naik	9,182	39.86%	▲0.57
AAP	Ranjit Cotta Carvalho	1,479	6.42%	New
INC	Jose D Silva	1,414	6.14%	▲3.06
NOTA	None of the Above	220	0.95%	New
MGP	D. S. Naik (Dilip)	155	0.67%	New
Margin of victory		1,334	5.79%	▼3.24
Turnout		23,038	79.48%	▼0.28
Registered electors		28,985		▲7.65
GFP gain from Independent		Swing	▼2.67	

=== Assembly Election 2012 ===
2012 Goa Legislative Assembly election : Fatorda
Party	Candidate	Votes	%	±%
Independent	Vijai Sardesai	10,375	48.31%	New
BJP	Damodar Naik	8,436	39.28%	▼0.76
Independent	Arthur D'Silva	1,126	5.24%	New
AITC	Piedade Noronha E Silva	695	3.24%	New
INC	M. K. Shaikh	660	3.07%	▼28.04
Margin of victory		1,939	9.03%	▲0.10
Turnout		21,475	79.63%	▲18.97
Registered electors		26,925		▼17.48
Independent gain from BJP		Swing	▲8.26	

=== Assembly Election 2007 ===
2007 Goa Legislative Assembly election : Fatorda
Party	Candidate	Votes	%	±%
BJP	Damodar Naik	7,943	40.05%	▲5.10
INC	Vijay Sardessai	6,172	31.12%	▼0.22
Independent	Noronha Piedade	3,640	18.35%	New
UGDP	Ibrahim	804	4.05%	▼20.45
MGP	Hazare Mahadev Narsinv	793	4.00%	New
Save Goa Front	Barretto Camilo	463	2.33%	New
Margin of victory		1,771	8.93%	▲5.32
Turnout		19,834	60.73%	▼0.29
Registered electors		32,630		▲22.30
BJP hold		Swing	▲5.10	

=== Assembly Election 2002 ===
2002 Goa Legislative Assembly election : Fatorda
Party	Candidate	Votes	%	±%
BJP	Damodar Naik	5,695	34.95%	▲5.51
INC	Cardoz Luis Alex Florenci	5,107	31.34%	▼16.37
UGDP	Monte Cruz Francisco Piedade	3,992	24.50%	▲9.94
NCP	Naik Sadanand Rajaram	662	4.06%	New
Independent	Ferrao Peter Marcel	556	3.41%	New
Independent	Buyao Ulhas Subray	275	1.69%	New
Margin of victory		588	3.61%	▼14.66
Turnout		16,294	61.04%	▲5.63
Registered electors		26,681		▼1.49
BJP gain from INC		Swing	▼12.76	

=== Assembly Election 1999 ===
1999 Goa Legislative Assembly election : Fatorda
Party	Candidate	Votes	%	±%
INC	Cardoz Luis Alex Florence	7,164	47.72%	▲9.29
BJP	Eng. Ashok Tukaram Korgaonkar	4,421	29.45%	New
UGDP	Kadam Shantaram Bhikaji	2,186	14.56%	New
MGP	Gaonkar Antonio Damiao	1,228	8.18%	New
Margin of victory		2,743	18.27%	▲15.83
Turnout		15,014	55.38%	▼10.13
Registered electors		27,084		▲23.98
INC hold		Swing	▲9.29	

=== Assembly Election 1994 ===
1994 Goa Legislative Assembly election : Fatorda
Party	Candidate	Votes	%	±%
INC	Cardoz Luis Alex Florence	5,504	38.43%	▼5.50
Independent	Angle Ramakant Soiru	5,154	35.98%	New
MGP	Naik Pradeep Gajanan	1,199	8.37%	New
Independent	Eng. Korgaonkar Ashok Tukaram	569	3.97%	New
BSP	Gomes Jose Fransisco	537	3.75%	New
UGDP	Sayed Iqbal	509	3.55%	New
Independent	J. Felix Afonso	198	1.38%	New
Margin of victory		350	2.44%	▼12.31
Turnout		14,324	64.34%	▼4.71
Registered electors		21,846		▲21.47
INC hold		Swing	▼5.50	

=== Assembly Election 1989 ===
1989 Goa Legislative Assembly election : Fatorda
Party	Candidate	Votes	%	±%
INC	Cardoz Luis Alex Florence	5,552	43.93%	New
MGP	Lotlikar Suryakant Datta	3,687	29.17%	New
Independent	Dias Nolasco Joao	3,016	23.86%	New
Independent	Dias Thomas Joaquim Rafael	140	1.11%	New
Margin of victory		1,865	14.76%	
Turnout		12,639	68.92%	
Registered electors		17,985		
INC win (new seat)				

== See also ==
- List of constituencies of the Goa Legislative Assembly
- South Goa district
