= Sanvordem Assembly constituency =

Legislative Assembly constituency in Goa State, India

Coordinates: 15.27°N 74.11°E

Sanvordem
- Constituency No. 38 for the Goa Legislative Assembly

Constituency details
- Country: India
- Region: Western India
- State: Goa
- District: South Goa
- Lok Sabha constituency: South Goa
- Established: 1989
- Total electors: 29,808
- Reservation: None

Member of Legislative Assembly
- 8th Goa Legislative Assembly
- Incumbent Ganesh Gaonkar
- Party: Bharatiya Janata Party

Sanvordem Assembly constituency is one of the 40 Goa Legislative Assembly constituencies of the state of Goa in southern India. Sanvordem is also one of the 20 constituencies falling under South Goa Lok Sabha constituency.

== Members of Goa Legislative Assembly ==
Year	Member	Party
1989	Mohan Amshekar	Maharashtrawadi Gomantak Party
1994	Vishnu Prabhu	Maharashtrawadi Gomantak Party
1999	Vinay Dinu Tendulkar	Bharatiya Janata Party
2002	Vinay Dinu Tendulkar	Bharatiya Janata Party
2007	Anil Salgaocar	Independent
2012	Ganesh Gaonkar	Bharatiya Janata Party
2017	Deepak Pauskar	Maharashtrawadi Gomantak Party
2022	Ganesh Gaonkar	Bharatiya Janata Party

== Election results ==
=== 2027 Assembly election ===
2027 Goa Legislative Assembly election: Sanvordem
Party	Candidate	Votes	%	±%
INC				
NDA				
NOTA	None of the above			
Majority				
Turnout				
gain from		Swing		

=== Assembly Election 2022 ===
2022 Goa Legislative Assembly election : Sanvordem
Party	Candidate	Votes	%	±%
BJP	Ganesh Gaonkar	11,877	44.77%	▲7.91
Independent	Deepak Pauskar	6,687	25.21%	New
MGP	Vinayak Gawas	3,768	14.20%	▼43.23
RGP	Vipin Naik	2,135	8.05%	New
AAP	Anil Gaonkar	846	3.19%	New
Independent	Gangaram Lambor	554	2.09%	New
INC	Khemalo Sawant	383	1.44%	▼2.46
NOTA	None of the Above	280	1.06%	▼0.15
Margin of victory		5,190	19.56%	▼1.01
Turnout		26,530	89.02%	▼0.84
Registered electors		29,803		▲5.53
BJP gain from MGP		Swing	▼12.67	

=== Assembly Election 2017 ===
2017 Goa Legislative Assembly election : Sanvordem
Party	Candidate	Votes	%	±%
MGP	Deepak Pauskar	14,575	57.43%	New
BJP	Ganesh Gaonkar	9,354	36.86%	▼8.45
INC	Shankar Kirlapalkar	991	3.91%	▼1.78
NOTA	None of the Above	305	1.20%	New
Margin of victory		5,221	20.57%	▲10.77
Turnout		25,377	89.86%	▲1.05
Registered electors		28,242		▲7.36
MGP gain from BJP		Swing	▲12.12	

=== Assembly Election 2012 ===
2012 Goa Legislative Assembly election : Sanvordem
Party	Candidate	Votes	%	±%
BJP	Ganesh Gaonkar	10,585	45.31%	▲26.07
Independent	Arjun Anil Salgaocar	8,294	35.50%	New
Independent	Ramnath Alias Deepak Prabhu	2,828	12.11%	New
INC	Govind Sawant	1,328	5.68%	▼3.30
CPI(M)	Prashant Budho Gaonkar	309	1.32%	▼0.08
Margin of victory		2,291	9.81%	▼25.41
Turnout		23,361	88.74%	▲11.88
Registered electors		26,305		▲2.95
BJP gain from Independent		Swing	▼9.15	

=== Assembly Election 2007 ===
2007 Goa Legislative Assembly election : Sanvordem
Party	Candidate	Votes	%	±%
Independent	Anil Salgaocar	10,705	54.46%	New
BJP	Vinay D. Tendulkar	3,782	19.24%	▼29.04
MGP	Jog Jagadish Raghunath	2,957	15.04%	▲14.12
INC	Pradeep Tukaram Dessai	1,766	8.98%	▼6.44
CPI(M)	Naresh Khusali Shigaonkar	275	1.40%	▼1.37
SS	Antao Menin	149	0.76%	▼0.66
Margin of victory		6,923	35.22%	▲16.89
Turnout		19,657	76.84%	▲5.48
Registered electors		25,551		▲7.56
Independent gain from BJP		Swing	▲6.18	

=== Assembly Election 2002 ===
2002 Goa Legislative Assembly election : Sanvordem
Party	Candidate	Votes	%	±%
BJP	Vinay Dinu Tendulkar	8,195	48.28%	▲19.02
Independent	Salgaocar Anil Vassudeva	5,084	29.95%	New
INC	Sadashiv Vaman Marathe	2,618	15.42%	▼9.54
CPI(M)	Naresh Khushali Shigaonkar	470	2.77%	▼6.51
SS	Ghadi Govind Harischandra	240	1.41%	▼1.23
Independent	Shet Arsekar Prashant Anant	203	1.20%	New
MGP	Pradeep Gajanan Naik	157	0.92%	▼10.97
Margin of victory		3,111	18.33%	▲14.03
Turnout		16,974	71.42%	▲4.55
Registered electors		23,755		▲1.11
BJP hold		Swing	▲19.02	

=== Assembly Election 1999 ===
1999 Goa Legislative Assembly election : Sanvordem
Party	Candidate	Votes	%	±%
BJP	Vinay Dinu Tendulkar	4,600	29.26%	New
INC	Gaonkar Ganesh Chandru	3,924	24.96%	New
Independent	Sadashiv Vaman Marathe	2,921	18.58%	New
MGP	Arun Bicholkar	1,870	11.90%	▼33.14
CPI(M)	Shigoankar Naresh Khushali	1,459	9.28%	New
SS	Naik Vassudev Dharmu	416	2.65%	New
UGDP	Ghadi Govind Harichandra	359	2.28%	New
Margin of victory		676	4.30%	▼6.10
Turnout		15,719	66.88%	▼4.64
Registered electors		23,495		▲4.32
BJP gain from MGP		Swing	▼15.77	

=== Assembly Election 1994 ===
1994 Goa Legislative Assembly election : Sanvordem
Party	Candidate	Votes	%	±%
MGP	Vishnu Prabhu	7,256	45.03%	▼12.77
INC	Marathe Sadashiv Vaman	5,580	34.63%	New
CPI(M)	Ulhas Bhikaji Naik	1,052	6.53%	New
Independent	Ghadi Govind Harichandra	938	5.82%	New
BSP	Tate Ramavithal	425	2.64%	New
Independent	Gaonkar Ganesh Chandru	357	2.22%	New
Independent	Dessai Sonba Raghoba	126	0.78%	New
Margin of victory		1,676	10.40%	▼11.75
Turnout		16,112	70.31%	▼1.25
Registered electors		22,522		▲8.46
MGP hold		Swing	▼12.77	

=== Assembly Election 1989 ===
1989 Goa Legislative Assembly election : Sanvordem
Party	Candidate	Votes	%	±%
MGP	Mohan Amshekar	8,737	57.80%	New
INC	Desaimadhavrao Shivajirao	5,388	35.65%	New
CPI	Khedakar Yashwant Uttarm	629	4.16%	New
Margin of victory		3,349	22.16%	
Turnout		15,115	71.05%	
Registered electors		20,765		
MGP win (new seat)				

== See also ==
- List of constituencies of the Goa Legislative Assembly
- South Goa district
