= Reginaldo Lourenco =

Indian politician and social worker

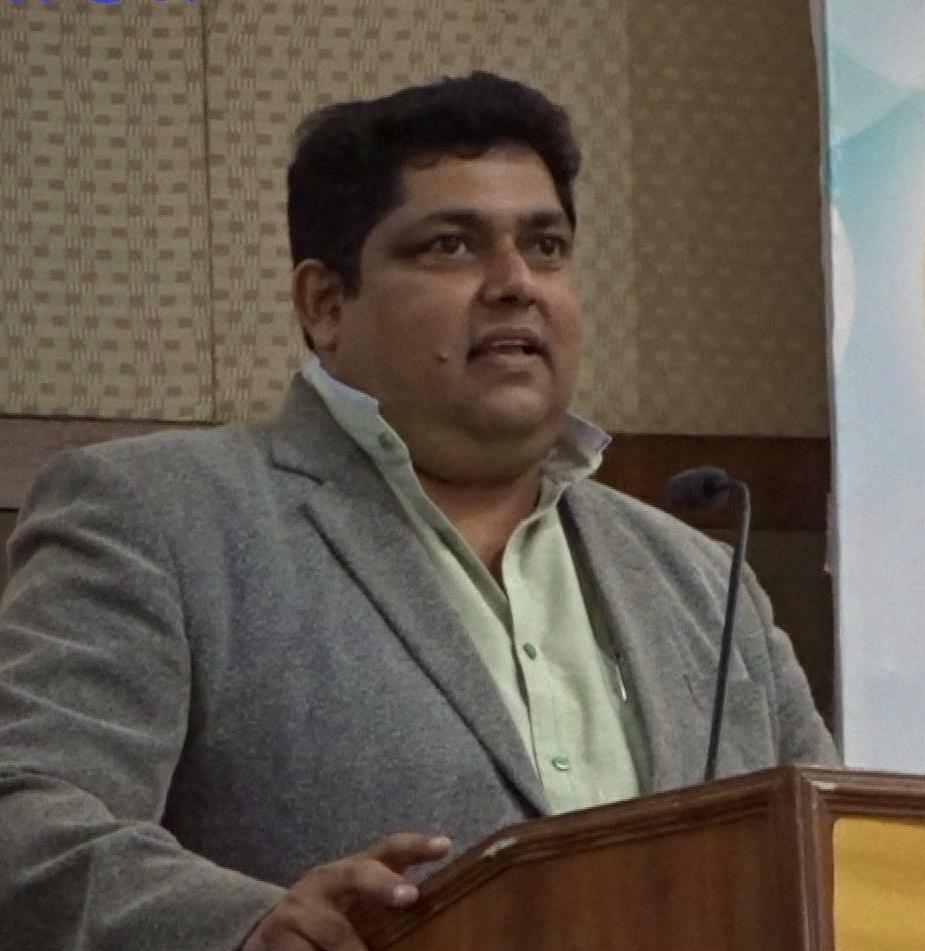
- Reginaldo in October 2018

Member of the Goa Legislative Assembly
- Incumbent
- Assumed office 2007
- Constituency: Curtorim

Personal details
- Born: Aleixo Reginaldo Lourenco Goa, India
- Other political affiliations: Save Goa Front (2007–2012); Indian National Congress (2012–2021)
- Occupation: Politician
- Profession: Farmer; social worker

Aleixo Reginaldo Lourenco, also known as Reginaldo, is an Indian politician who is a four term member of the Goa Legislative Assembly for Curtorim. He has been Chairman of the Goa Industrial Development Corporation since 2022.

In 2022, he lent his support as an independent to the Bharatiya Janata Party to form the Government in Goa.

== Committees in the Goa Legislative Assembly ==
He was member of the following committees in the house till 2021

- Seventh Legislative Assembly 2017
- Sixth Legislative Assembly 2012
- Member, Estimates Committee
- Member, Committee On Petitions
- Member, Select Committee on The Goa Succession, Special Notaries and Inventory
- Fifth Legislative Assembly 2007-2012
- Member, Committee On Delegated Legislation
- Member, Estimates Committee
- Member, Committee On Public Undertakings
- Member, Select Committee On The Goa Agricultural Tenancy (Amendment)
- Member, Select Committee On The Goa Land Use (Regulation, Amendment)
- Member, Select Committee On the Goa, Daman and Diu Mundkar (Protection from Eviction) Act, 1975
- Member, Select Committee On The Goa Public Service Guarantee

== Lok Sabha ==
He contested the 2014 Lok Sabha election from south Goa, losing to the Bharatiya Janata Party candidate.

== Electoral history ==
=== 2022 result ===
Goa Legislative Assembly Election, 2022: Curtorim
Party	Candidate	Votes	%	±%
AAP	Domnic Gaonkar	2793	12.51	
AITC	Anthony Alberto Pexito	353	1.58	
BJP	Anthony Barbosa	2385	10.68	
INC	Moreno Rebelo	3905	17.49	
Independent	Aleixo Lourenco	8960	40.12	

=== 2017 ===
Goa Legislative Assembly Election, 2017: Curtorim
Party	Candidate	Votes	%	±%
INC	Aleixo Lourenco	12,841	60.28	
BJP	Arthur D'silva	5144	24.14	
AAP	Edwin Dominic Vaz	2711	12.72	
Maharashtrawadi Gomantak	Concericao Dias	240	1.13	
Independent	Jose Paulo Fernandes	118	0.55	
NOTA	None of the Above	249	1.69	
Majority		7697	36.14	
Turnout				
INC hold		Swing		

=== 2014 ===
2014 Indian general elections: South Goa
Party	Candidate	Votes	%	±%
BJP	Narendra Keshav Sawaikar	1,98,776	48.44	+6.16
INC	Aleixo Lourenco	1,66,446	40.56	−6.32
AITC	Churchill Alemao	11,932	2.91	
AAP	Swati S Kerkar	11,246	2.74	
IND	Govind Gaude	7,152	1.74	
Majority		32,330	7.88	
Turnout		4,10,369	75.27	
BJP gain from INC		Swing	+6.24	

=== 2012 result ===
2012 Goa Legislative Assembly election: Curtorim
Party	Candidate	Votes	%	±%
INC	Alexio Lourenco	11221	57	
Independent	Dominic Goankar	7,152	36	
Majority		4069	21	
Turnout				
INC hold		Swing		

=== 2007 result ===
2007 Goa Legislative Assembly election: Curtorim
Party	Candidate	Votes	%	±%
Save Goa Front	Alexio Lourenco	9,320	54	
INC	Sardinha Cosme Francisco Caitano	7493	43	
Majority		1827	11	
Turnout				
Save Goa Front gain from INC		Swing		
