= Eduardo Faleiro =

Indian politician and advocate (born 1940)

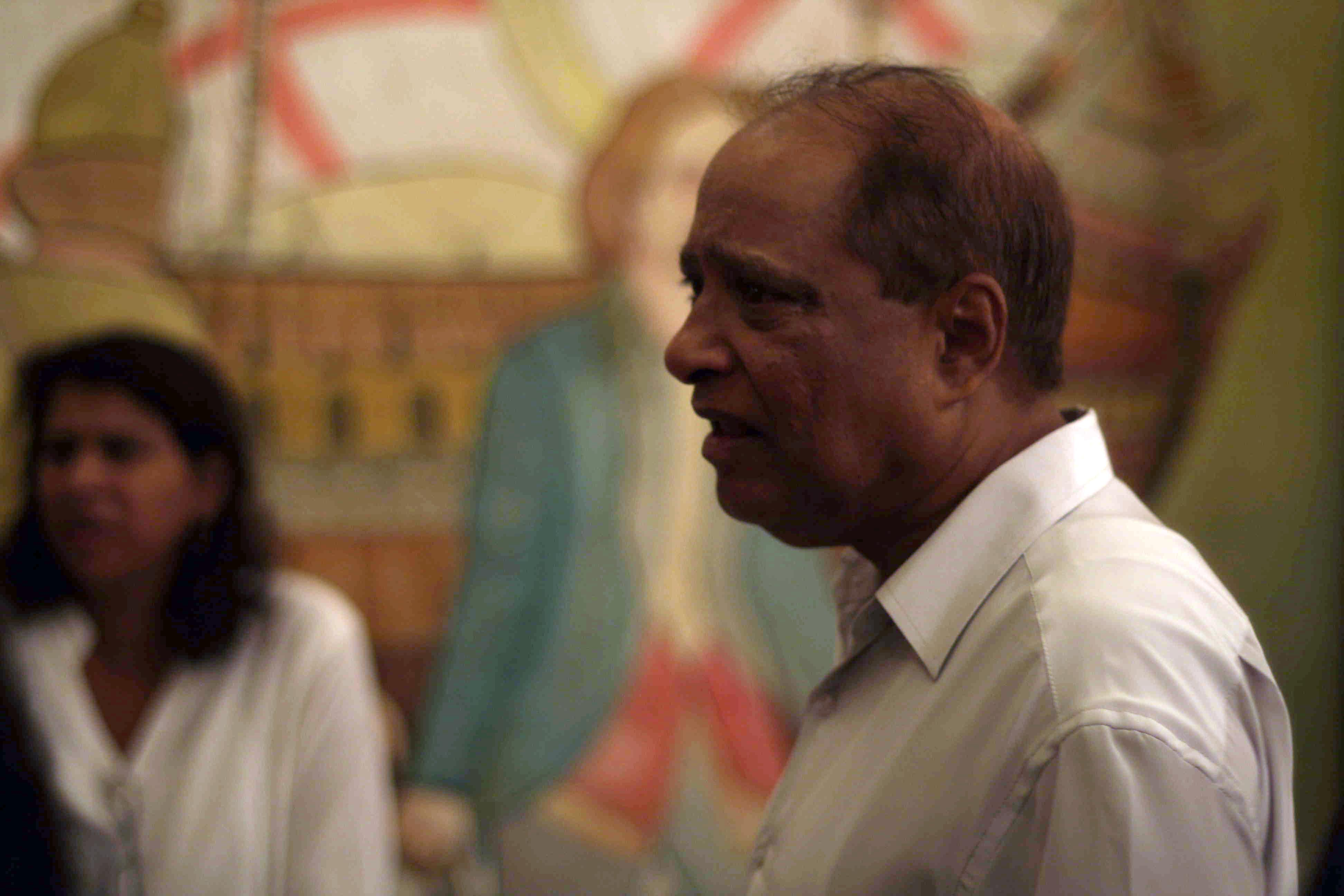
- Faleiro in 2000

Member of Parliament, Rajya Sabha
- In office 29 July 1999 – 28 July 2005
- Preceded by: John Fernandes
- Succeeded by: Shantaram Naik
- Constituency: Goa

Member of Parliament, Lok Sabha
- In office 26 March 1977 – 16 May 1996
- Preceded by: Erasmo de Sequeira
- Succeeded by: Churchill Alemao
- Constituency: South Goa

Personal details
- Born: 30 August 1940 (age 85) Lisbon, Portugal
- Party: Indian National Congress
- Spouse: Muriel de Mascarenhas (m. 1971)
- Children: 3, including Sonia
- Education: Master of Laws
- Occupation: Politician; advocate

Eduardo Faleiro (born 30 August 1940) is an Indian politician, former advocate of Supreme Court of India, and former federal minister. In September 2006, he served as the commissioner for non-resident Indian affairs for the Congress Government of Goa.

== Early life ==
Eduardo Faleiro was born on 30 August 1940 in Lisbon, Portugal, to Martinho Faleiro.

== Political career ==
Faleiro was a Union Cabinet minister at the Indian federal government in New Delhi from 1986 to 1996. Earlier, he was a member of the legislative assembly of Goa for a short while, before shifting to national-level politics. When the Indian National Congress, a party he has associated with for most of his political career, was out of power, Faleiro was a member of the Rajya Sabha too, the upper house of the Indian parliament.

== Personal life ==
Faleiro married Muriel de Mascarenhas on 30 December 1971. He has three daughters: Sonia, a writer based in London, UK; Shaila; and Nirmala, who are both IT professionals.

== Honours ==
Faleiro was knighted by the Prime Minister of Portugal António Costa with the 'Grande-Oficial da Ordem do Infante D. Henrique' in January 2017.

== Positions held ==
- 1971-1976: Member, Goa Legislative Assembly
- 1974-1976: Deputy Leader, CLP (I), Goa Legislative Assembly
- 1977: Elected to the Sixth Lok Sabha
- 1980: Re-elected to the Seventh Lok Sabha
- 1982-1986: Chairman, Economic Development Corporation
- 1984: Elected to the Eighth Lok Sabha for the third consecutive time
- 1985-1986: Chairman, House Committee
- May 1986 to February 1988: Union Minister of State, External Affairs February 1988 to December 1989: Union Minister of State, Economic Affairs (Finance)
- 1989-1990: Elected to the Ninth Lok Sabha for the fourth time
- 1990: Member, Committee of Privileges; Member, Consultative Committee; Ministry of Planning and Program Implementation
- 1991: Elected to the Tenth Lok Sabha for the fifth time
- 1992: Leader of the Indian Delegation to the United Nations
- 23 June 1991 to January 1993: Union Minister of State, External Affairs
- 18 January 1993 to April 1996 – Union Minister of State, Chemicals & Fertilizers, Ocean Development, Electronics, Parliamentary Affairs
- 1995: Vice Chairperson of Independent World Commission on Oceans
- 26 July 1999: Elected Member of Rajya Sabha (Council of States)

In March 2006, Mr Faleiro was appointed commissioner for Non-resident Indian Affairs by the Government of Goa, with the rank of a cabinet minister.

2007: Chairman of Universal Peace Federation of India (non-governmental organization in consultative status in the Social and Economic Council of the United Nations)
