= Anil Salgaocar =

Indian businessman and politician (1940–2016)

Member of Goa Legislative Assembly
- In office 2007–2012
- Preceded by: Vinay Dinu Tendulkar
- Succeeded by: Ganesh Gaonkar
- Constituency: Sanvordem

Personal details
- Born: Anil Vasudev Salgaocar; 26 December 1940
- Died: 1 January 2016 (aged 75) Singapore
- Party: Independent
- Spouse: Lakshmi Salgaocar
- Children: 4
- Parent: Vasudev Salgaocar
- Occupation: Businessman; politician

Anil Vasudev Salgaocar (26 December 1940 – 1 January 2016) was an Indian mining businessman and politician who served as a member of the Goa Legislative Assembly, representing the Sanvordem Assembly constituency from 2007 to 2012. He was the owner of Salgaocar Mining Industries Private Limited.

== Early life ==
Anil Salgaocar was born on 26 December 1940, to Vasudev Salgaocar. He has two brothers, Shivanand and Dattaraj Salgaocar.

== Personal life ==
Salgaocar was married to Lakshmi and they had four children; daughters Chandana and Purnima, and sons Sameer and Arjun, who are also active in politics.

== Death ==
Salgaocar died in Singapore on 1 January 2016.

== Controversies ==
Salgaocar was named in the Panama Papers.
