= V. M. Salgaocar =

Indian businessman (1916–1984)

Vasudev Salgaocar
- Born: Vasudev Mahadeva Salgaocar; 1916
- Died: 1984 (aged 67–68)
- Citizenship: Indian
- Occupation: Businessman
- Known for: Founder of V. M. Salgaocar Group
- Children: 7, including Anil Salgaocar

Vasudev Mahadeva Salgaocar (1916–1984) was an Indian businessman and the founder and chairman of the V. M. Salgaocar Group of Companies. The group was primarily involved in iron ore mining, but also engaged in coal mining and wind energy.

== Career ==
Salgaocar also founded the Salgaocar Football Club in 1956, a professional football club which has played in the I-League, based in Vasco, Goa. Since his death, the company was led by his two sons, Shivanand and Dattaraj Salgaocar, as joint managing directors until the split.

== Personal life ==
His third son was businessman and politician Anil Salgaocar who died in 2016, at the age of 75, in Singapore.
