= Ramakant Angle =

Indian Politician from the state of Goa

Member of Parliament Lok Sabha
- In office 6 October 1999 – 16 May 2004
- Preceded by: Francisco Sardinha
- Succeeded by: Churchill Alemao
- Constituency: South Goa

Personal details
- Born: 9 January 1950 (age 76) Goa, India

Ramakant Angle is an Indian Politician from the state of Goa. He was a member of the 13th Lok Sabha. He represented the South Goa Lok Sabha constituency between 1999-2004. He was member of Bharatiya Janata Party but later he joined the Indian National Congress.
