= Shyam Satardekar =

Indian politician

Shyam Satardekar (born 3 March 1966 in Curchorem, Goa) is an Indian politician and member of the Goa Suraksha Manch. Satardekar was a member of the Goa Legislative Assembly from the Curchorem constituency in South Goa.
