= Francisco Sardinha =

Indian politician (born 1946)

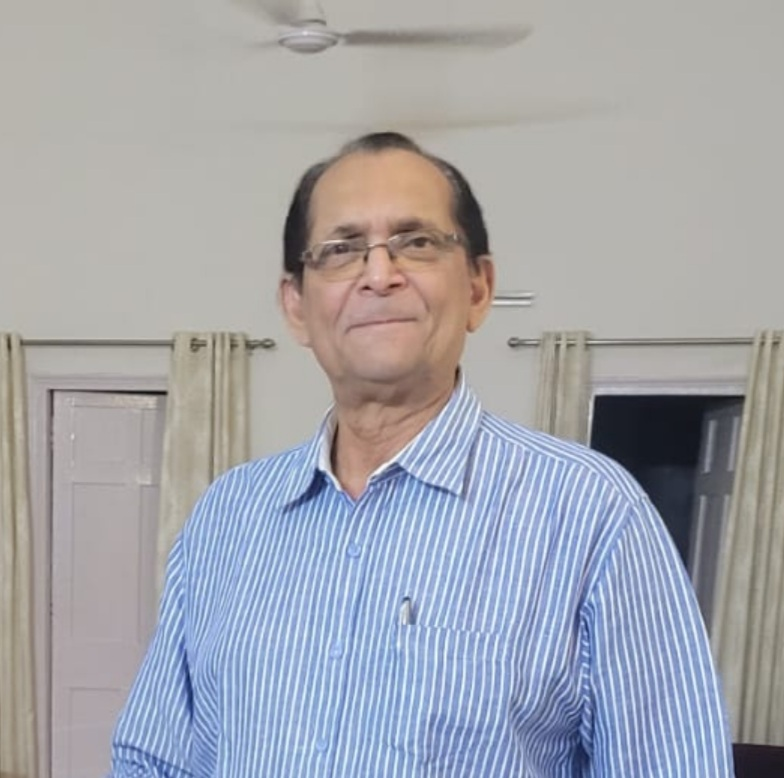
- Sardinha in 2022

Member of Parliament, Lok Sabha
- In office 23 May 2019 – 4 June 2024
- Preceded by: Narendra Keshav Sawaikar
- Succeeded by: Viriato Fernandes
- Constituency: South Goa
- In office 2007–2014
- Preceded by: Churchill Alemao
- Succeeded by: Narendra Keshav Sawaikar
- Constituency: South Goa
- In office 10 March 1998 – 26 April 1999
- Preceded by: Churchill Alemao
- Succeeded by: Ramakant Angle
- Constituency: South Goa

7th Chief Minister of Goa
- In office 24 November 1999 – 23 October 2000
- Preceded by: Luizinho Faleiro
- Succeeded by: Manohar Parrikar

MLA of Curtorim (Goa)
- In office 1999–2007
- Preceded by: Gaonkar Antonio Damiao
- Succeeded by: Aleixo Lourenco
- In office 1977–1994
- Preceded by: Eduardo Faleiro
- Succeeded by: Gaonkar Antonio Damiao

Speaker of the Goa Legislative Assembly
- In office 28 February 2005 – 11 June 2007
- Deputy: Victoria Fernandes
- Preceded by: Vishwas Satarkar
- Succeeded by: Pratapsingh Rane

Personal details
- Born: 15 April 1946 (age 80) Curtorim, Goa, Portuguese India
- Party: Indian National Congress
- Spouse: Maria Columba Sardinha (m. 1976)
- Children: 3
- Education: Parvatibai Chowgule College; Nirmala Institute of Education

Francisco Cosme Sardinha (born 15 April 1946) is an Indian politician who served as the seventh Chief Minister of Goa from 1999 to 2000. He also served as the Member of Parliament (MP), representing South Goa Lok Sabha constituency. Sardinha was the Speaker of the Goa Legislative Assembly from February 2005 to June 2007. He is a senior leader of the Indian National Congress party, having won 6 times as MLA from Curtorim assembly and 4 times as Lok Sabha MP from South Goa constituency.

== Personal life ==
Francisco Sardinha was born on 15 April 1946 in Curtorim, South Goa district to Caetano Sardinha and Rosa Maria Sardinha. He is married to Maria Columba Sardinha since 23 May 1976. The couple have three sons.

== Political career ==
Sardinha was a member of the Goa Legislative Assembly from 1977–1994. He held many portfolios in the Government of Goa under the Chief Ministership of Pratapsing Rane. He was elected to the 12th Lok Sabha in 1998 from Mormugao constituency in Goa.

He again became a member of the Goa Legislative Assembly in 1999 and remained in office till 2007.

In 1999, he broke away from the Indian National Congress and formed a new political party, the Goa People's Congress, and became Chief minister of a coalition government in the state. He remained in office till 2000.

Later, Sardinha's GPC merged with Indian National Congress on 5 April 2001. He became Speaker of Goa Legislative Assembly in 2005.

He was elected to the 14th Lok Sabha in a by-election in November, 2007 from Mormugao. He was re-elected to the 15th Lok Sabha in 2009 from South Goa constituency.

Sardinha is credited with many pioneering contributions in Goa's development especially in education, agriculture, and sports. In his term as Member of Parliament (2009–2014), he was appointed Chairman of the Estimates Committee, the most prestigious committee of Lok Sabha. He was the 25th Chairman of the Committee since 1950 and one of the five longest-serving Chairmen.

== Positions held ==
#	From	To	Position
1.	1977	1980	MLA (1st term) from Curtorim
2.	1980	1984	MLA (2nd term) from Curtorim
3.	1984	1989	MLA (3rd term) from Curtorim
4.	1989	1994	MLA (4th term) from Curtorim
5.	1998	1999	MP (1st term) in 12th Lok Sabha from South Goa
6.	1999	2002	MLA (5th term) from Curtorim; Chief Minister of Goa (Nov 1999-Oct 2000)
7.	2002	2007	MLA (6th term) from Curtorim; Speaker of Goa Assembly (Feb 2005-Jun 2007)
8.	2007	2009	MP (2nd term) in 14th Lok Sabha from South Goa (by-poll)
9.	2009	2014	MP (3rd term) in 15th Lok Sabha from South Goa
10.	2019	2024	MP (4th term) in 17th Lok Sabha from South Goa
