= Ganesh Gaonkar =

Indian politician

Speaker of Goa Legislative Assembly
- Incumbent
- Assumed office 25 September 2025
- Preceded by: Ramesh Tawadkar

Member of Goa Legislative Assembly
- Incumbent
- Assumed office 2022
- Preceded by: Deepak Pauskar
- Constituency: Sanvordem
- In office 2012–2017
- Preceded by: Anil Salgaocar
- Succeeded by: Deepak Pauskar
- Constituency: Sanvordem

Personal details
- Born: Ganesh Gaonkar; 9 December 1958 (age 67) Sanguem, Goa
- Party: Bharatiya Janata Party
- Spouse: Sadischya Gaonkar
- Education: Bachelor of Arts
- Alma mater: University of Mysore
- Profession: Dealer in Iron Ore & Transport Contractor

Ganesh Chandru Gaonkar is an Indian politician who was elected to the Goa Legislative Assembly from Sanvordem in the 2022 Goa Legislative Assembly election as a member of the Bharatiya Janata Party. He is also elected as Pro-Tem Speaker of 8th Goa Legislative Assembly.
