= Curtorim =

- Town
- Location in Goa, India Curtorim (India)
- Coordinates: 15.28°N 74.03°E
- Country: India
- State: Goa
- District: South Goa
- Sub-district: Salcete

Government
  - Body: Panchayat
  - MLA: Aleixo Reginaldo Lourenco
- Elevation: 33 m (108 ft)

Languages
  - Official: Konkani
- Time zone: UTC+5:30 (IST)
- Vehicle registration: GA-08
- Website: goa.gov.in

Curtorim is a town in the Salcette taluka of South Goa district in Goa, India. It comes under Margao metropolitan region. Curtorim, a verdant agrarian village, known as the "granary of Salcete", is said to have got its name from either kuddtari or kuddtoddi since the agricultural village had kudds (rooms) built on the river bank (toddir) to store kharif and rabi crops.

== Geography ==
Curtorim is located at 15.28°N 74.03°E. It has an average elevation of 33 m (108 ft).

== History ==
A copper-plate inscription was issued by King Viramarmadeva of the Kadamba dynasty in 1049 CE concerning a grant of a piece of land called "Tudukapura" in "Kudtarika agrahara" of "Chhat sathi desha". This inscription suggests that "Kudatari" or modern Curtorim was known as "Kudatarika" then. "Chhat sathi" refers to modern Salcete, known as Sashti in the local Konkani language. It had an 'Agrahara', which means an education centre or a university in the modern sense, and was started most probably by the said monarch Viramarmadeva or by Sasthadeva II or Guhalladeva II of Goa Kadamba dynasty.

== Religion ==
St. Alex Church, the principal parish church.

Curtorim has a predominantly Catholic population. The Church of St. Alex is the main feature of the village. It is one of the oldest churches in Goa. It was built in 1597 midst a scenic natural backdrop of a lake Angoddi Tollem across the woods on the site of an ancient Hindu temple dedicated to the deity Ravalnath (a form of Lord Shiva). The remains of the ancient temple of Ravalnath are still visible today. The church of St Alex was first a chapel; in 1808 it was converted to a parish church. This location once housed the "Kudtari/Kundodari" Mahamaya temple deities, now currently located at Ghudo Avadem. Although the feast of the patron Saint Alex is celebrated with great fervour on 17 July, it is the feast of Our Lady of Guadalupe on 18 December that is extremely popular amongst the villagers as the "Feast of O" or "kelleam fest" (feast of bananas).

Minorities include Hindus. The Shanta Durga Chamundeshwari Temple is one among the few temples in the village and is located in the same vicinity as the Church of St. Alex.

== Politics ==
The first MLA of Curtorim (Goa Assembly constituency) was Mr Enio Pimenta who also was a prominent freedom fighter. As of July 2018, the MLA is Aleixo Reginaldo Lourenco. Curtorim is also part of South Goa (Lok Sabha constituency).

Distinguished people from this village include Gen. Sunith Francis Rodrigues, who was the ex-chief of the Indian Army Staff and Governor of Punjab from 2004 to 2010 and former South Goa MP Francisco Sardinha.
