= South Goa Lok Sabha constituency =

Lok Sabha constituency in Goa

Coordinates: 15.00°N 74.05°E

South Goa GA-2
- Lok Sabha constituency
- Interactive Map Outlining South Goa Lok Sabha constituency

Constituency details
- Country: India
- Region: Western India
- State: Goa
- Assembly constituencies: 20: Ponda, Siroda, Marcaim, Mormugao, Vasco Da Gama, Dabolim, Cortalim, Nuvem, Curtorim, Fatorda, Margao, Benaulim, Navelim, Cuncolim, Velim, Quepem, Curchorem, Sanvordem, Sanguem and Canacona
- Established: 1962
- Total electors: 5,98,767
- Reservation: None

Member of Parliament
- 18th Lok Sabha
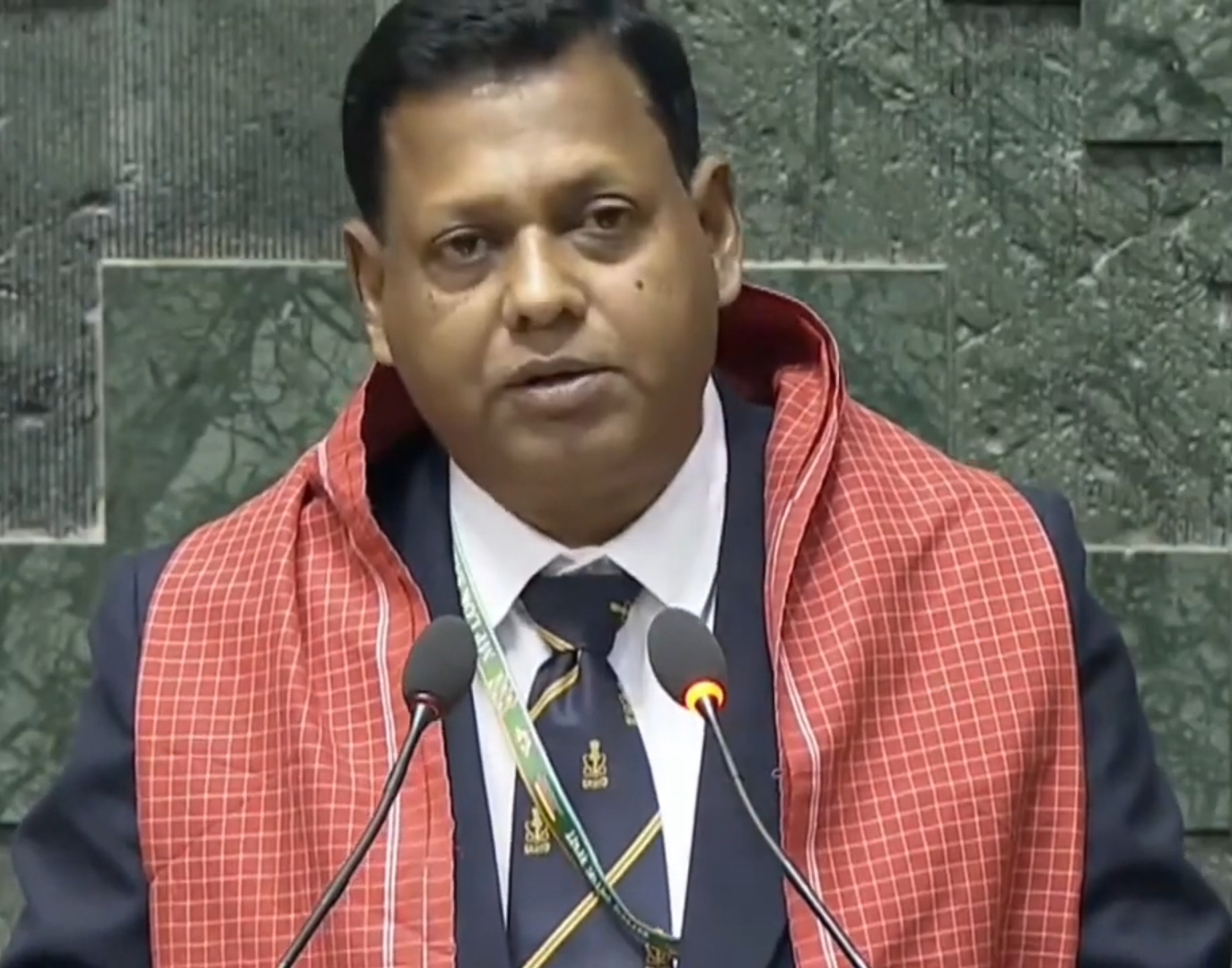
- Incumbent Viriato Fernandes
- Party: Indian National Congress
- Elected year: 2024

South Goa Lok Sabha constituency (Mormugao prior to 2008) is one of two Lok Sabha (parliamentary) constituencies in Goa in western India along with North Goa.

Most successful parties from South Goa lok sabha
1. INC(10 times) (58.8%)
2. BJP(2 times) (11.8%)
3. UGP(2 time) (11.8%)
4. MGP(1 time) (5.88%)
5. INC(U)(1 time) (5.88%)
6. UGDP(1 time) (5.88%)

== Assembly segments ==
Presently, South Goa Lok Sabha constituency comprises 20 Vidhan Sabha (legislative assembly) segments. These are:

No	Name	District	Member	Party	Leading (in 2024)
21	Ponda	North Goa	Ravi Naik	BJP	BJP
22	Siroda	North Goa	Subhash Shirodkar	BJP	BJP
23	Marcaim	North Goa	Sudin Dhavalikar	MGP	BJP
24	Mormugao	South Goa	Sankalp Amonkar	BJP	BJP
25	Vasco Da Gama	South Goa	Krishna Salkar	BJP	BJP
26	Dabolim	South Goa	Mauvin Godinho	BJP	BJP
27	Cortalim	South Goa	Antonio Vas	IND	INC
28	Nuvem	South Goa	Aleixo Sequeira	BJP	INC
29	Curtorim	South Goa	Aleixo Lourenco	IND	INC
30	Fatorda	South Goa	Vijai Sardesai	GFP	INC
31	Margao	South Goa	Digambar Kamat	BJP	BJP
32	Benaulim	South Goa	Venzy Viegas	AAP	INC
33	Navelim	South Goa	Ulhas Tuenkar	BJP	INC
34	Cuncolim	South Goa	Yuri Alemao	INC	INC
35	Velim	South Goa	Cruz Silva	AAP	INC
36	Quepem	South Goa	Altone D'Costa	INC	INC
37	Curchorem	South Goa	Nilesh Cabral	BJP	BJP
38	Sanvordem	South Goa	Ganesh Gaonkar	BJP	BJP
39	Sanguem	South Goa	Subhash Phal Desai	BJP	BJP
40	Canacona	South Goa	Ramesh Tawadkar	BJP	BJP

== Members of Parliament ==
Year	Member	Party
1962	Antonio Colaço^^	Goa Provincial Congress
1962	Mukund Shinkre^^^	Maharashtrawadi Gomantak Party
1967	Erasmo de Sequeira	United Goans Party
1971	Erasmo de Sequeira	United Goans Party
1977	Eduardo Faleiro	Indian National Congress
1980	Eduardo Faleiro	Indian National Congress (U)
1984	Eduardo Faleiro	Indian National Congress
1989	Eduardo Faleiro	Indian National Congress
1991	Eduardo Faleiro	Indian National Congress
1996	Churchill Alemao	United Goans Democratic Party
1998	Francisco Sardinha	Indian National Congress
1999	Ramakant Angle	Bharatiya Janata Party
2004	Churchill Alemao	Indian National Congress
2007^	Francisco Sardinha	Indian National Congress
2009	Francisco Sardinha	Indian National Congress
2014	Narendra Sawaikar	Bharatiya Janata Party
2019	Francisco Sardinha	Indian National Congress
2024	Viriato Fernandes	Indian National Congress

^ by poll
^^ Nominated in August 1962 and served till the first elections
^^^Elected in December 1963

== Election results ==
=== 2024 ===
2024 Indian general election: South Goa
Party	Candidate	Votes	%	±%
INC	Viriato Fernandes	217,836	48.35	▲0.88
BJP	Pallavi Shrinivas Dempo	2,04,301	45.35	▲0.17
RGP	Rubert Pereira	18,885	4.19	New
NOTA	NOTA	4,837	1.07	▼0.21
Majority		13,535	3.00	▲0.70
Turnout		4,50,956	75.29	▲1.98
INC hold		Swing	▲0.88	

=== 2019 ===
2019 Indian general elections: South Goa
Party	Candidate	Votes	%	±%
INC	Francisco Sardinha	201,561	47.47	+6.91
BJP	Narendra Keshav Sawaikar	1,91,806	45.18	−3.26
AAP	Elvis Gomes	20,891	4.92	+2.18
NOTA	None of the Above	5,436	1.28	
SS	Rakhi Prabhudesai Naik	1,763	0.42	+0.42
IND.	Dmayur Kanchonkar	1,705	0.40	+0.40
IND.	Kalidas Prakash Vaingankar	1,413	0.33	+0.33
Majority		9,755	2.30	−5.58
Turnout		4,24,718	73.31	−1.96
INC gain from BJP		Swing		

=== 2014 ===
2014 Indian general elections: South Goa
Party	Candidate	Votes	%	±%
BJP	Narendra Keshav Sawaikar	1,98,776	48.44	+6.16
INC	Aleixo Lourenco	1,66,446	40.56	−6.32
AITC	Churchill Alemao	11,932	2.91	
AAP	Swati S Kerkar	11,246	2.74	
IND	Govind Gaude	7,152	1.74	
Majority		32,330	7.88	
Turnout		4,10,369	75.27	
BJP gain from INC		Swing	+6.24	

=== 2009 ===
2009 Indian general elections: South Goa
Party	Candidate	Votes	%	±%
INC	Francisco Sardinha	1,27,494	46.87	
BJP	Narendra Keshav Sawaikar	1,14,978	42.27	
UGDP	Matanhy Saldanha	16,727	6.15	
CPI	Adv Raju Mangeshkar	4,563	1.68	
Majority		12,516	4.60	
Turnout		2,71,960	50.95	
INC win (new seat)				

== See also ==
- South Goa district
- List of constituencies of the Lok Sabha
