= Vinay Dinu Tendulkar =

Indian politician (born 1961)

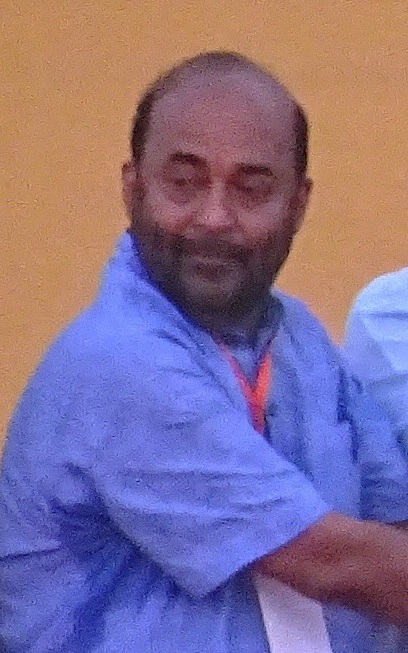
- Tendulkar in 2017

Member of Parliament Rajya Sabha
- In office 31 July 2017 – 28 July 2023
- Preceded by: Shantaram Naik
- Succeeded by: Sadanand Tanavade
- Constituency: Goa

President of Bharatiya Janata Party, Goa
- In office 2012–2020
- Preceded by: Laxmikant Parsekar
- Succeeded by: Sadanand Tanavade

Member of Goa Legislative Assembly
- In office 1999–2007
- Preceded by: Vishnu Prabhu
- Succeeded by: Anil Salgaocar
- Constituency: Sanvordem

Personal details
- Born: 25 September 1961 (age 65) Khandepar, Goa, Portuguese India
- Party: Bharatiya Janata Party
- Spouse: Vibha V. Tendulkar
- Children: 1
- Education: Mysore University, Karnataka

Vinay Dinu Tendulkar (born 25 September 1961) is an Indian politician who served as the Member of Parliament, Rajya Sabha from Goa from 2017 to 2023. He is a senior leader of Bharatiya Janata Party and has been the President of Bharatiya Janata Party, Goa from 2012 to 2020, for two consecutive terms.

Currently, he is a member of the Rubber Board committee and the Consultative Committee for the Ministry of Agriculture and Farmers Welfare. He is a member of the Transport, Tourism and Culture committee, prior to which he made substantial contribution towards forest development and protection in 2002 when he was the Forest Minister of Goa, as a part of Manohar Parrikar's Cabinet, the then Chief Minister of Goa. He was also a member of the Goa Legislative Assembly from March 1999 to June 2007. He was the vice chairman of the Goa State Infrastructure Development Corporation from 2000 to 2004.

== Early life and education ==
Born on 25 September 1961 in Khandepar, Distt. South Goa (Goa), to parents Shri Dinu A. Tendulkar and Shrimati Nilabai D. Tendulkar. Tendulkar, from his early life was a part of RSS and joined BJP in 1980. He was constantly involved in serving the weaker section of society to improve the quality of their life. Tendulkar has a Diploma in mechanical engineering from Mysore University, Karnataka. He quit his job in a mining company in 1994 to pursue politics full-time and was the president of Goa Youth BJP from 1994 to 1999. He later went on winning the Sanvordem seat twice- in 1999 and 2002.

== Political career ==
Currently, serving as the Member of Parliament, Rajya Sabha from Goa, Tendulkar has made commendable contributions to the Goa government in over two decades. Tendulkar's tenure as Goa party unit chief saw the BJP winning both the Lok Sabha seats in the state in 2014, a rare achievement for the party, and returning to power early in 2017 despite not being the single largest party in the Assembly.

In July 2017, he took an oath as a Rajya Sabha MP from Goa. Tendulkar's parliamentary statistics are a testimony to his exceptional work in the parliament. He has raised 68 starred and unstarred questions in the parliament, furthermore, he has participated in 87 debates in his tenure.

In his term as an MP, Tendulkar has provided various works to be carried out in his constituency from his MPLADs fund. He provided financial assurance to the Muslim community for the repair of Margao kabrastan, to reconstruct the damaged protection wall, and also to repair the shed.

=== Contribution in Covid 19 ===
Tendulkar sanctioned Rs. One Crore from the MPLADS Fund for the relief during the COVID-19 pandemic. He also gave his one month's salary to the Chief Minister's Relief Fund - Goa to support the state in the health emergency caused by COVID-19. Tendulkar also administered assistance to four rural hospitals in Goa and provided medical oxygen free of cost to patients in need. He provided dry ration to the migrant workers and the poor. He equally made efforts to generously help states like Madhya Pradesh, Karnataka, and Maharashtra in the procurement of ration for the migrant workers and travel assistance to ensure the safe return of the migrant workers.

== Positions held ==
- 1994 to 1999 President, Goa Youth BJP
- 1999 to 2007 Member, Goa Legislative Assembly
- 1999 to 2005 Chairman, Planning and Development Authority of Goa
- 2000 to 2004 Vice Chairman, Goa State Infrastructure Development Cooperation
- 2005 to 2012 Vice President, Goa State BJP
- 2012 to January 2020 President, Goa State BJP
- Chairman of Sahyadridudhsagar Education Society since 2015
- Elected to Rajya Sabha in July 2017
- September 2017 to May 2019 Member, Committee on Transport, Tourism and Culture
- September 2019 onwards, Member, Committee on Transport, Tourism and Culture
- 2018 - 2020 Member, Rehabilitation Council of India

Member of Consultative Committee for the Ministry of Agriculture and Farmers Welfare Member of Rubber board

== Career in social work ==
Tendulkar has been associated with movements related to mining from the very beginning of his political career and has efficiently managed to highlight their issues at various platforms. He has also worked towards providing employment opportunities to the poor. He formed a corporate society consisting of villagers from local mining jobs and provided job opportunities to them in the transport sector.

He has always been a hard-working party worker and worked towards the welfare of people. When he was the Forest minister in 2002, Tendulkar provided job opportunities and even arranged vehicles for villagers from rural areas to Dudhsagar and provided employment to them.

He always aimed at primary education for children from economically weaker sections. He was the Chairman of the Educational Society at Atal Bihari Vajpayee Higher Secondary School in 2002 and Sahyadridudhsagar Education Society since 2015.

== Cultural activities ==
Tendulkar is also fond of acting and has appeared in over 150 Marathi and Konkani plays. He was the president of Goa Chess Association from 2012 to 2017. In 2018, Sanjeev Verekar wrote a remarkable book Dabhal to Dili, on Tendulkar's life.

== Personal life ==
Tendulkar is married to Vibha V. Tendulkar and resides in Khadpabandh, Goa. They have a son.
