= Narendra Sawaikar =

Indian politician

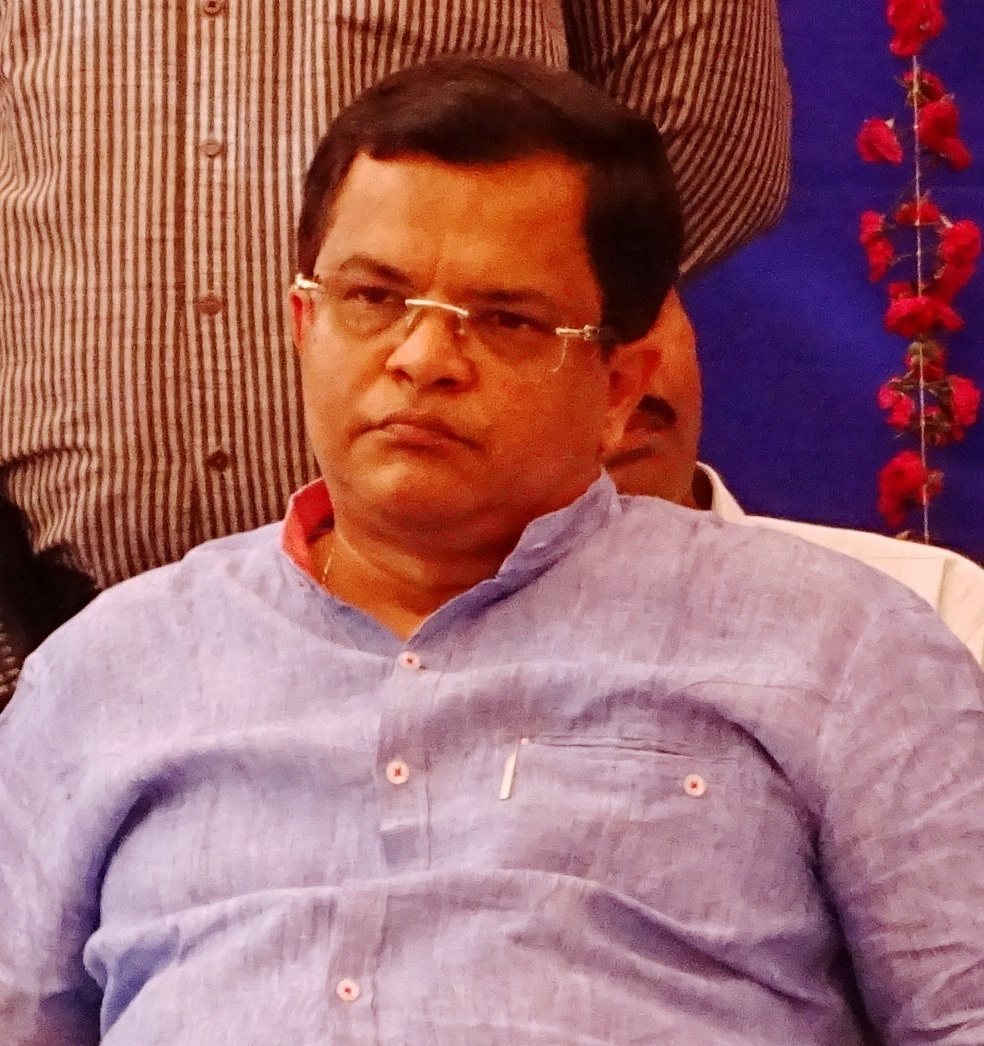
- Sawaikar in 2015

Member of Parliament, Lok Sabha
- In office 16 May 2014 – 23 May 2019
- Prime Minister: Narendra Modi
- Preceded by: Francisco Sardinha
- Succeeded by: Francisco Sardinha
- Constituency: South Goa

Personal details
- Born: Narendra Keshav Sawaikar; 29 December 1966 (age 59)
- Party: Bharatiya Janata Party
- Children: 1
- Profession: Advocate, Agriculturist

Narendra Keshav Sawaikar is an Indian advocate and politician who has served as Commissioner for NRI Affairs in the Government of Goa since July 2019. He previously served as a Member of Parliament, representing South Goa from 2014 to 2019.

== Personal life ==
He was born on 29 December. He completed his SSCE from M.I.B.K. High School, Khandepar, Ponda. After completing his HSSCE from the Dhempe Higher Secondary School in Panaji, he pursued B.A. from the Bombay University

Sawaikar achieved a degree in law (LL.B) from the Goa University. His wife is a teacher by profession.

== Political and legal career ==
During college days Shri. Sawaikar was actively associated with Students Movement of Goa and had successfully led many agitations. Mr. Sawaikar also served as the Chairman of the Students' Council of Goa University.

He began his legal profession as a junior under Justice Ferdino Rebello, the former Chief Justice of Allahabad High Court. He has also served as the Standing Counsel for Union of India and represented Govt. Of Goa in the High court of Bombay at Goa.

He began his political career as Panchayat incharge and for 9 years worked as the General secretary of BJP South Goa, District. Later he was appointed as state secretary of BJP's Goa unit and State General Secretary of BJP Goa Pradesh.

He also served as the Chairman of the Goa State Law Commission. He is actively associated with the Goa's cooperative movement and is with the Goa Bagayatdar Sahakari Kharedi Vikri Sanstha Maryadit- the state's largest cooperative society and is presently the Chairman of the said society. since 2006, also he served as the society's Chairman.

He unsuccessfully contested the 2009 Lok Sabha elections from South Goa seat. He contested 2014 Lok Sabha elections from the South Goa seat as BJP candidate. From 2014 to 2019 he was the member of the 16th Lok Sabha. On 5 June 2014, he took oath as member of the 16th Lok Sabha in Konkani language.

== Election results ==
General Election, 2014: South Goa
Party	Candidate	Votes	%	±%
BJP	Narendra Keshav Sawaikar	1,98,776	48.44	+6.16
INC	Aleixo Reginaldo Lourenco	1,66,446	40.56	−6.32
AITC	Churchill Alemao	11,932	2.91	
Majority		32,330	7.88	
Turnout		410,369		
BJP gain from INC		Swing	+6.24	
