= Shripad Naik =

Indian politician (born 1952)

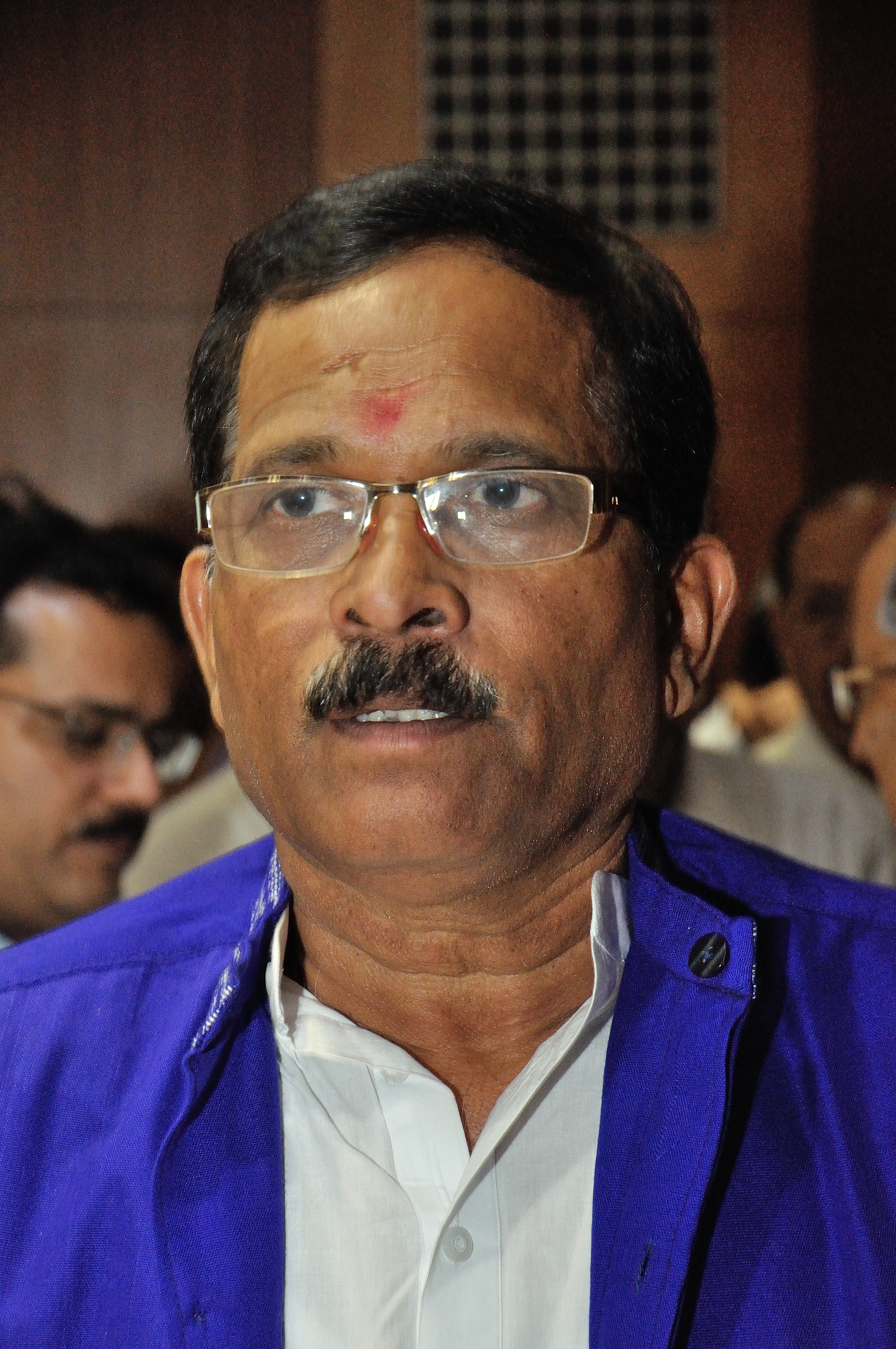
- Naik in 2014

Union Minister of State for Power and New & Renewable Energy
- Incumbent
- Assumed office 10 June 2024
- Minister: Manohar Lal Khattar (Minister of Power); Pralhad Joshi (Minister of New and Renewable Energy)
- Preceded by: Krishan Pal Gurjar (Power); Bhagwanth Khuba (New and Renewable Energy)

Union Minister of State for Tourism
- In office 7 July 2021 – 9 June 2024
- Minister: G. Kishan Reddy
- Preceded by: Prahlad Singh Patel
- Succeeded by: Suresh Gopi

Union Minister of State for Ports, Shipping and Waterways
- Incumbent
- Assumed office 7 July 2021
- Minister: Sarbananda Sonowal
- Preceded by: Mansukh L. Mandaviya

Union Minister of State (Independent Charge) for AYUSH
- In office 9 November 2014 – 7 July 2021
- Prime Minister: Narendra Modi
- Preceded by: Office established
- Succeeded by: Sarbananda Sonowal (as Minister of AYUSH)

Union Minister of State for Defence
- In office 30 May 2019 – 7 July 2021
- Minister: Rajnath Singh
- Preceded by: Subhash Ramrao Bhamre
- Succeeded by: Ajay Bhatt

Union Minister of State (Independent Charge) for Culture and Tourism
- In office 26 May 2014 – 9 November 2014
- Prime Minister: Narendra Modi
- Preceded by: Chiranjeevi
- Succeeded by: Mahesh Sharma

Member of Parliament, Lok Sabha
- Incumbent
- Assumed office 6 October 1999
- Preceded by: Ravi Naik
- Constituency: North Goa, Goa

Member of Goa Legislative Assembly
- In office 1994 – 1999
- Preceded by: Ravi Naik
- Succeeded by: Sudin Dhavalikar
- Constituency: Marcaim

Personal details
- Born: 4 October 1952 (age 74) Adpai, Goa, Portuguese India
- Party: Bharatiya Janata Party
- Spouse: Vijaya Naik (m. 1984; died 2021)
- Children: 3
- Occupation: Politician

Shripad Yesso Naik (born 4 October 1952) is an Indian politician who has served as a member of parliament from North Goa, representing the Bharatiya Janata Party since 1999. He is currently Minister of State for New and Renewable Energy, and previously held a number of other ministerial positions.

He was named Minister of State (Independent Charge) of the Ministry of AYUSH in 2014. He was appointed Minister of State for Defence in 2019. He was also the union minister of state for Health and Family Welfare and the minister of state for Tourism and Ports, Shipping and Waterways of India, (in Second Modi ministry).

== Early life ==
Shripad Yesso Naik was born on 4 October 1952 in Adpai, Portuguese Goa.

== Political career ==
=== Parliament ===
In 1999, Naik was elected to the 13th Lok Sabha from North Goa constituency. He has held his seat in this constituency consistently, winning in 2004, 2009, 2014 and 2019 elections. In the 2014 Lok Sabha election, he won with a margin of 105,000 votes.

In 2024, he was also a Bharatiya Janata Party candidate from North Goa for the sixth time in a row.

=== Minister roles ===
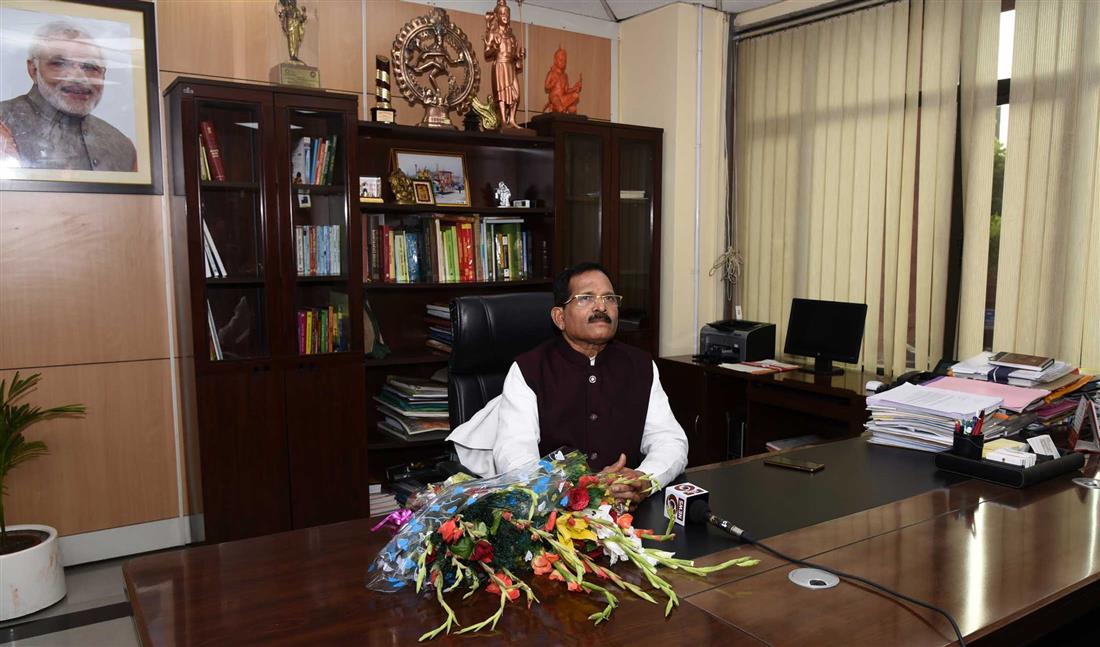
Shri Shripad Yesso Naik taking charge as the Minister of State for AYUSH (Independent Charge), in New Delhi on 31 May 2019.

Further, as advised by the Prime Minister Narendra Modi, the President appointed Naik as Minister for Culture and Tourism (Independent Charge) in the 16th Lok Sabha. He was one of probable candidates for Goa CM while Manohar Parrikar made as Union/Central minister.

Naik was appointed Minister of State (Independent Charge) of the Ministry of AYUSH, Government of India, on 9 November 2014. On 25 March 2016, Naik publicly stated he had access to research which proved that diseases such as cancer could be cured by yoga. He further stated that his Ministry was a year away from granting an endorsement to such techniques and research. The statement was challenged by medical researchers, scholars and doctors, who advocated caution in claiming a cure to cancer on the basis of unproven and unpublished research with no scientific evidence.

Naik continued as Minister of State (Independent Charge) for AYUSH and was appointed Minister of State for Defence on 31 May 2019.

In July 2021, he was named Union Minister of State for Tourism and Ports, Shipping and Waterways, which he was until June 5, 2024.

In June 2024, he was appointed Union Minister of State for New and Renewable Energy. At the FICCI Green Hydrogen Summit in 2025, he stated India aimed to capture close to 10% of global green hydrogen demand.

== Awards ==
Naik received the Samaraj Ratna Award on 18 August 2016.

== 2021 car accident ==
Naik was in an accident on the evening of 11 January 2021 in Ankola, Karnataka. His car driver was traveling en route from Yellapur to Gokarna when they were reported to have lost control at the wheel on the ghat section, causing the car to go turtle into a ditch. Due to the accident, Naik's wife and his personal secretary suffered grievous injuries, and died while undergoing treatment in the hospital. Naik was severely injured.

Lok Sabha
Preceded by Ravi Naik	Member of Parliament for North Goa; 1999 – Present	Incumbent
Political offices
Preceded by Chiranjeevi	Minister of Culture; 24 May 2014 – 9 November 2014; Minister of State with Independent charge	Succeeded by Mahesh Sharma
Preceded by Chiranjeevi	Minister of Tourism; 24 May 2014 – 9 November 2014; Minister of State with Independent charge	Succeeded by Mahesh Sharma
Preceded by N/A; Ministry Created	Minister of AYUSH; 9 November 2014 – 7 July 2021; Minister of State with Independent charge	Succeeded by Sarbananda Sonowal
