= Maestro Josinho =

Indian saxophonist (1941–2017)

- D'Souza in an undated photo released by Tiatr Academy of Goa in 2012
- Born: Josinho Souza; 15 July 1941; Velim, Goa, Portuguese India
- Died: 8 May 2017 (aged 75); Velim, Goa, India
- Other names: Juzinho; Josinho de Velim
- Citizenship: India (from 1961)
- Occupations: Saxophonist; playwright
- Years active: 1965–c. 2010
- Awards: All India Radio "Star of the Month" (2005); TAG's "Lifetime Contribution to Tiatr Award" (2011)
- Musical career
- Origin: Velim, South Goa
- Instruments: Saxophone; clarinet; trumpet
- Member of: AVC Pops

Josinho D'Souza (Goan Konkani: Juzinho; né Souza; 15 July 1941 – 8 May 2017), known professionally as Maestro Josinho, was an Indian saxophonist and playwright who worked on the Konkani stage. Described by The Navhind Times as a leading saxophonist in tiatrs, D'Souza is regarded as one of the stalwarts of the Konkani stage. Throughout his career spanning over five decades, his music has been featured in approximately 3000 tiatrs and 250 audio cassettes.

== Early life ==
Josinho D'Souza, originally named Josinho Souza, was born on 15 July 1941, in Velim, Goa, which was then part of Portuguese India under the Portuguese Empire. His parents were Caetano Piedade Souza, a musician, and Luizinha Filomena Luis. Growing up in Zaino-Velim, D'Souza developed a deep passion for music from an early age.

D'Souza held the position of choirmaster at the St Roque Church in Tollecanto. During the golden phase of tiatr (1961–1970s), he played a pivotal role in establishing the AVC Pops, a prominent big band. The band's repertoire prominently featured the trumpet and saxophone.

The St Roque Church, in its earlier form, featured an architectural ensemble that included a portico and a baptistry that also served as a reconciliation chapel. This space was utilized as an educational institution, offering instruction in various disciplines such as language, music, and entrepreneurship. The administration of this educational endeavor was entrusted to D'Souza along with Father Teles, from the Handmaids of Christ, as well as instructors named Nicholau, and Abraham.

== Career ==
D'Souza embarked on his musical journey at the age of 13 by learning to play the clarinet. In the year 1965, he established his own band called AVC Pops. Subsequently, from 1966 to 1970, D'Souza dedicated himself in teaching music at St. Rock's High School in Tollecanto. Throughout his career, D'Souza's musical prowess extended to approximately 3000 tiatrs, which were performed across various regions in India, as well as in Gulf countries and London.

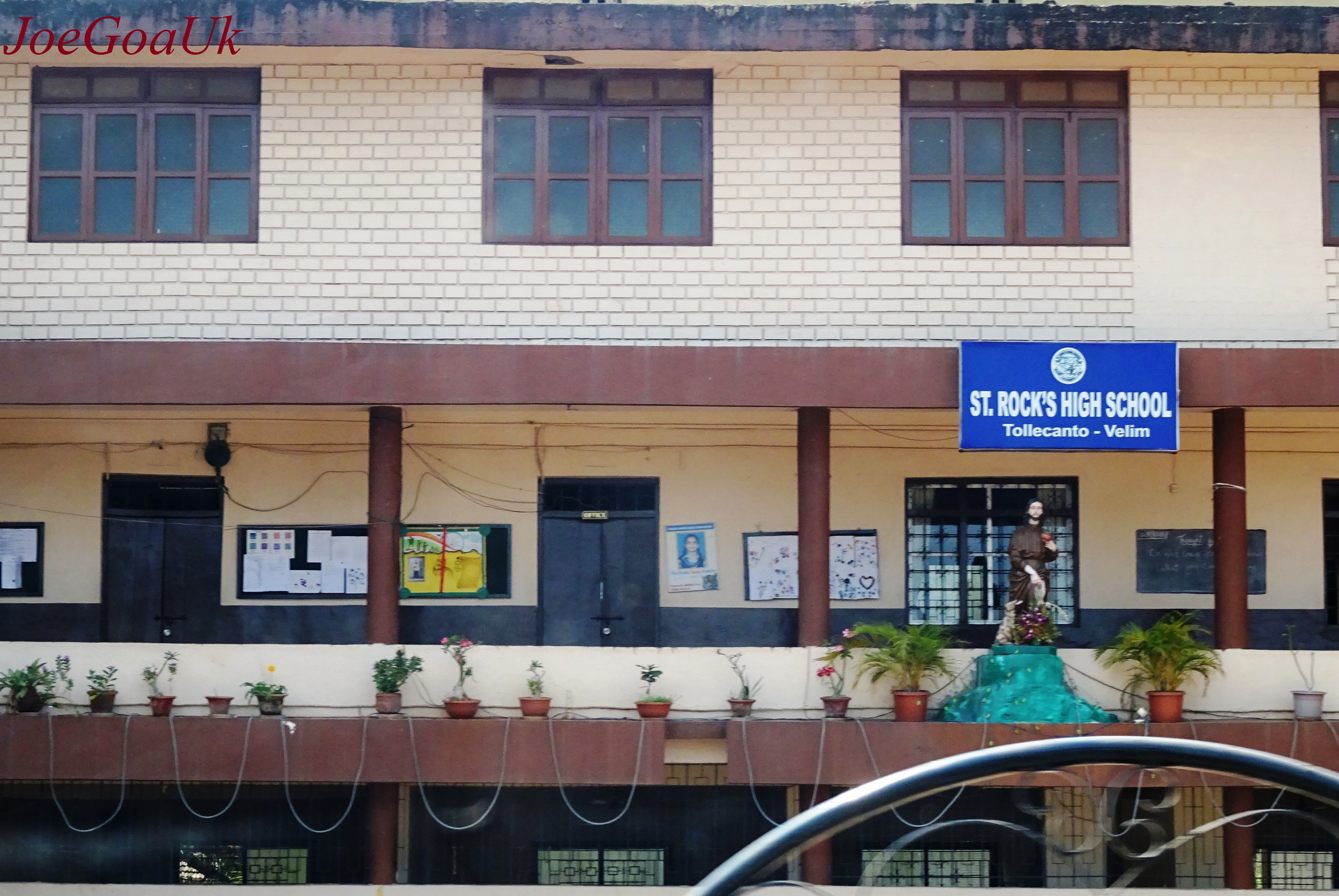
St. Rock's High School, 2016

D'Souza's involvement in the tiatr industry extended beyond live musical performances. He also made contributions in the design and operation of background music for various tiatrs. Some of the tiatrs in which he showcased his musical talents include "Patok" (Sin), "Ghatki Bhoinn" (Traitor Sister), "Sucorina", "Duddu ani Ginean" (Money and Sense), "Sonvsarant Astana Diat", and "Ostori" (Woman). Furthermore, he lent his musical expertise to approximately 230 audio cassettes. Beyond his work as a musician, D'Souza also made contributions as a playwright, having written three tiatrs: "Mai Paiche Dekhik Lagon", "Angovnnecho Put", and "Toddoki Pai".

D'Souza released his album titled "Mhozo Anvddo". The album consisted of a collection of six instrumental tracks and six Konkani songs. Within the instrumental tracks, Goan music was prominently featured, particularly in the final piece, which incorporated a medley of dekhnni and other Goan folk songs. The titular song, performed by D'Souza himself, expressed his yearning for Goan youth to embrace music education, with a specific emphasis on wind instruments. During that era, there were only a limited number of young musicians proficient in wind instruments. Additionally, D'Souza contributed his musical talents to the albums "Ek Uzvadd Tum" and "Tum Ani Hanv Mellonk".

D'Souza, during an interview in Bombay (now Mumbai), crossed paths with Domingos Santano Rodrigues, professionally known as Dominic de Arambol, when he made his journey back to Goa from Bombay in 1989 after the passing of his father. The interview brought together approximately 72 musicians from various parts of India for an audition. Out of this group, only 13 individuals, including Rodrigues, were chosen for further opportunities.

In subsequent years, D'Souza and Rodrigues collaborated on numerous musical performances, making contributions to the field of music. Their combined efforts resulted in the creation of nearly 250 audio cassettes. However, the duo eventually decided to go their separate ways. Rodrigues then joined Menino de Bandar's troupe, where he performed for a decade. Subsequently, he became a member of Prince Jacob's troupe, where he showcased his talent for 10 years and 4 months.

== Awards ==
In 2005, D'Souza was honored as the Star of the Month by All India Radio. Throughout his career, D'Souza received numerous accolades which include the Gulab Award in 1996, the Culture Overseas Best Music Award in 2002 in Kuwait, and the first prize for music in the tiatr "Rater" in 2003. In further recognition of his achievements, D'Souza was bestowed with the Goa State Cultural Award in 2008, the Dr Jack Sequeira Award in 2009, and the TAG's Lifetime Contribution to Tiatr Award in 2011.

== Death ==
On 8 May 2017, D'Souza died at his residence in Zaino-Velim, at the age of 75. The Tiatr Academy of Goa (TAG), representing the community of tiatr artists and enthusiasts, expressed its condolences and heartfelt sympathies to the family.

== Selected stage works ==
Year	Title	Role	Notes	Ref
1982	Ostori	Musician		
1984	Sucorina	Musician		
2003	Rater	Musician		
2004	Almanchea Disa	Musician		
2007	Goodbye London	Musician		
2008	Hi Maim Konnachi	Musician		
2008	Hevui Chukik Bhogsonnem Nam	Musician		
	Hevui Chukik Bhogsonnem Assa – Part II	Musician		
	Ghatki Bhoinn	Musician		
	Duddu ani Ginean	Musician		
	Sonvsarant Astana Diat	Musician		
	Mai Paiche Dekhik Lagon	Writer, director & musician		
	Angovnnecho Put	Writer, director & musician		
	Toddoki Pai	Writer, director & musician		
2010	Patok	Musician		

== Select discography ==
=== Albums ===
- Classic Goa: Hits of the Millennium (1999)
- Aguad Jeilik Burak (2001)
- Ek Uzvadd Tum (2006)
- Mhozo Anvddo (2007)
- Tum Ani Hanv Mellonk (2011)
- Pelo
- Ophelia
- Dennem

=== Audio cassettes ===
- Goinchi Girestkai (2004)
- Ponvotti (2013)
- Diana

=== VCDs ===
- Khorem Bhangar (2004)
- Thank You Kuwait (2011)
- Duets of C. Alvares (posthumously; 2019)
