= Baradi, Goa =

Neighborhood in Goa, India

Baradi Barade
- Neighborhood
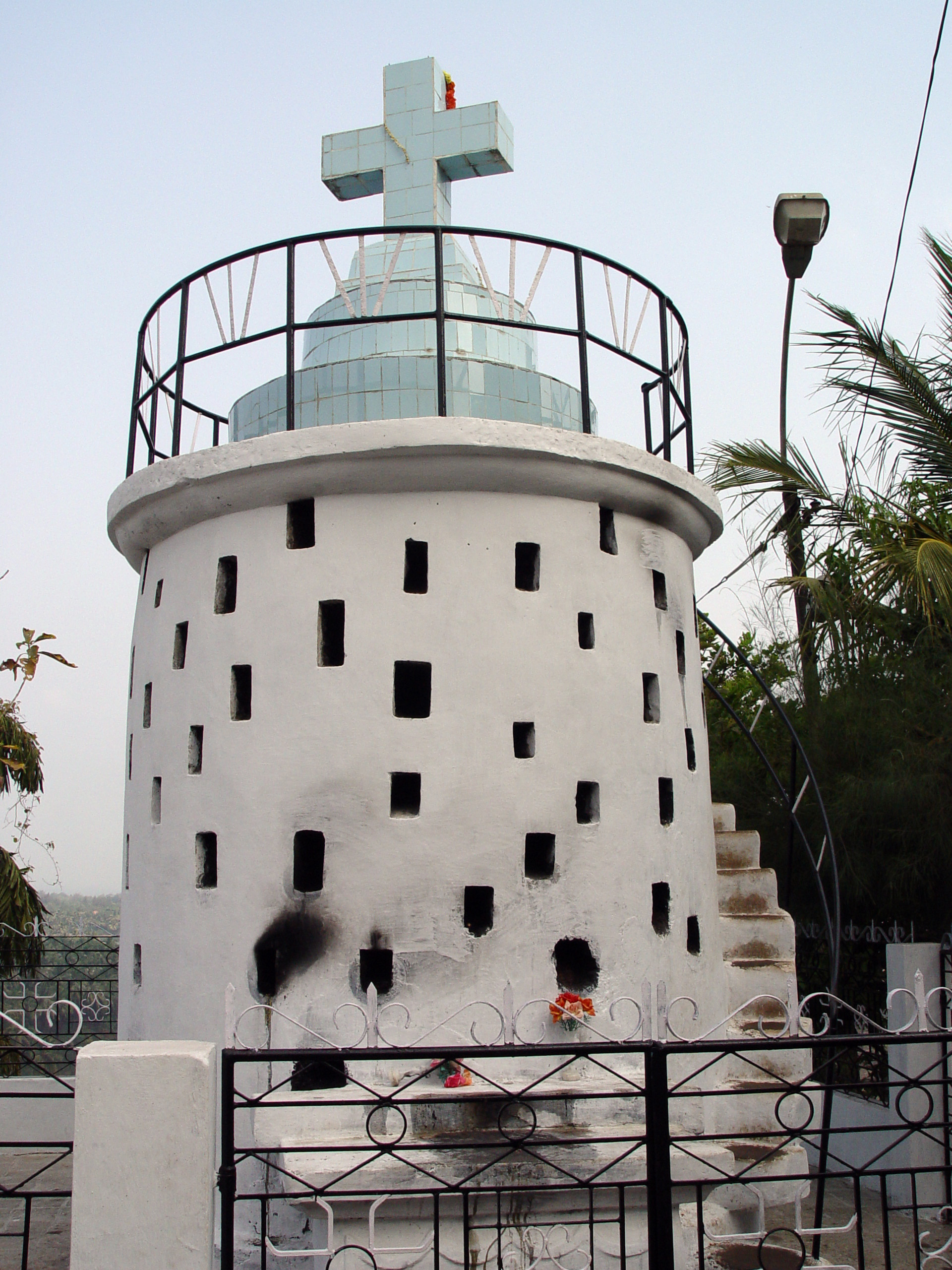
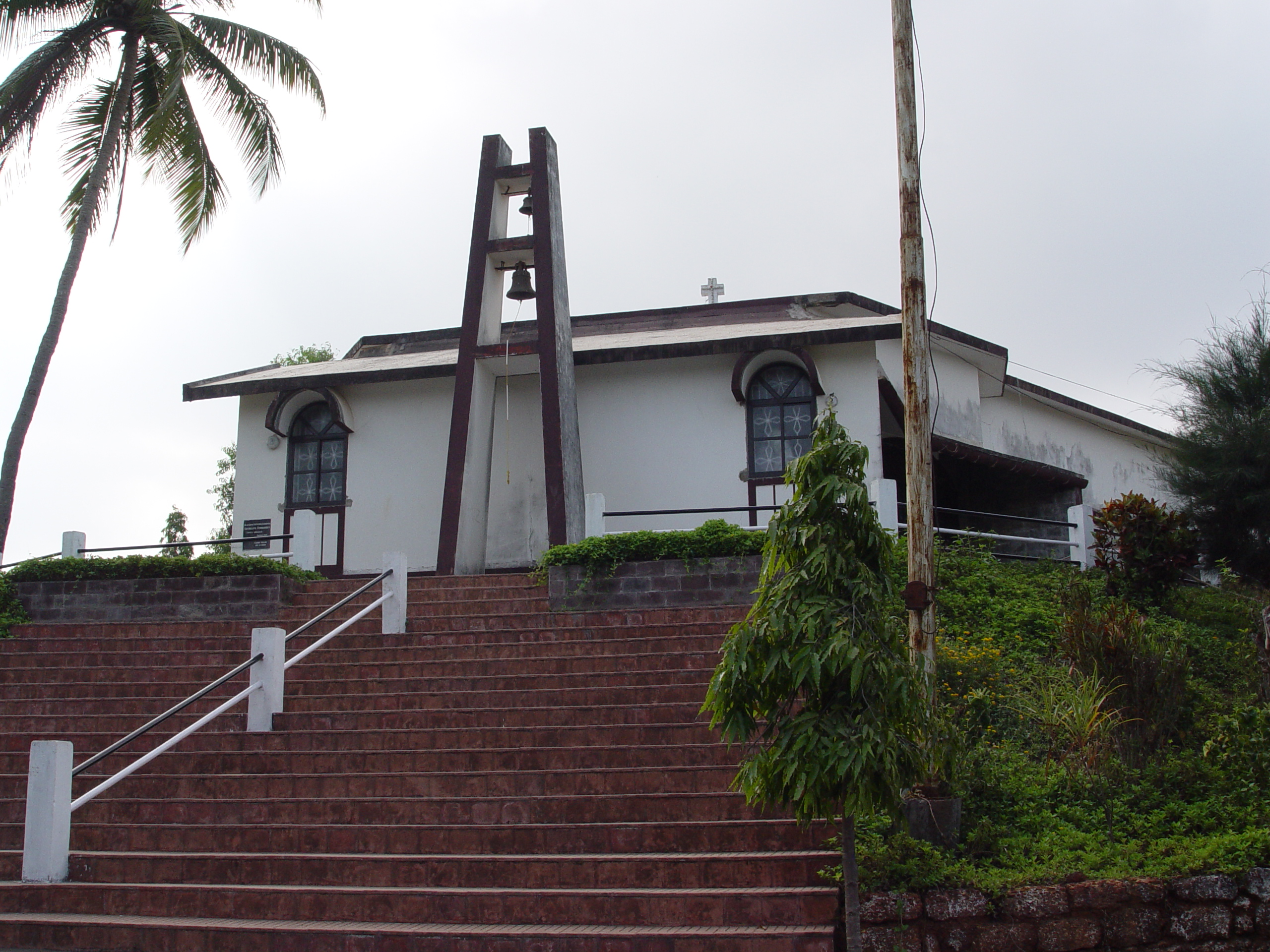
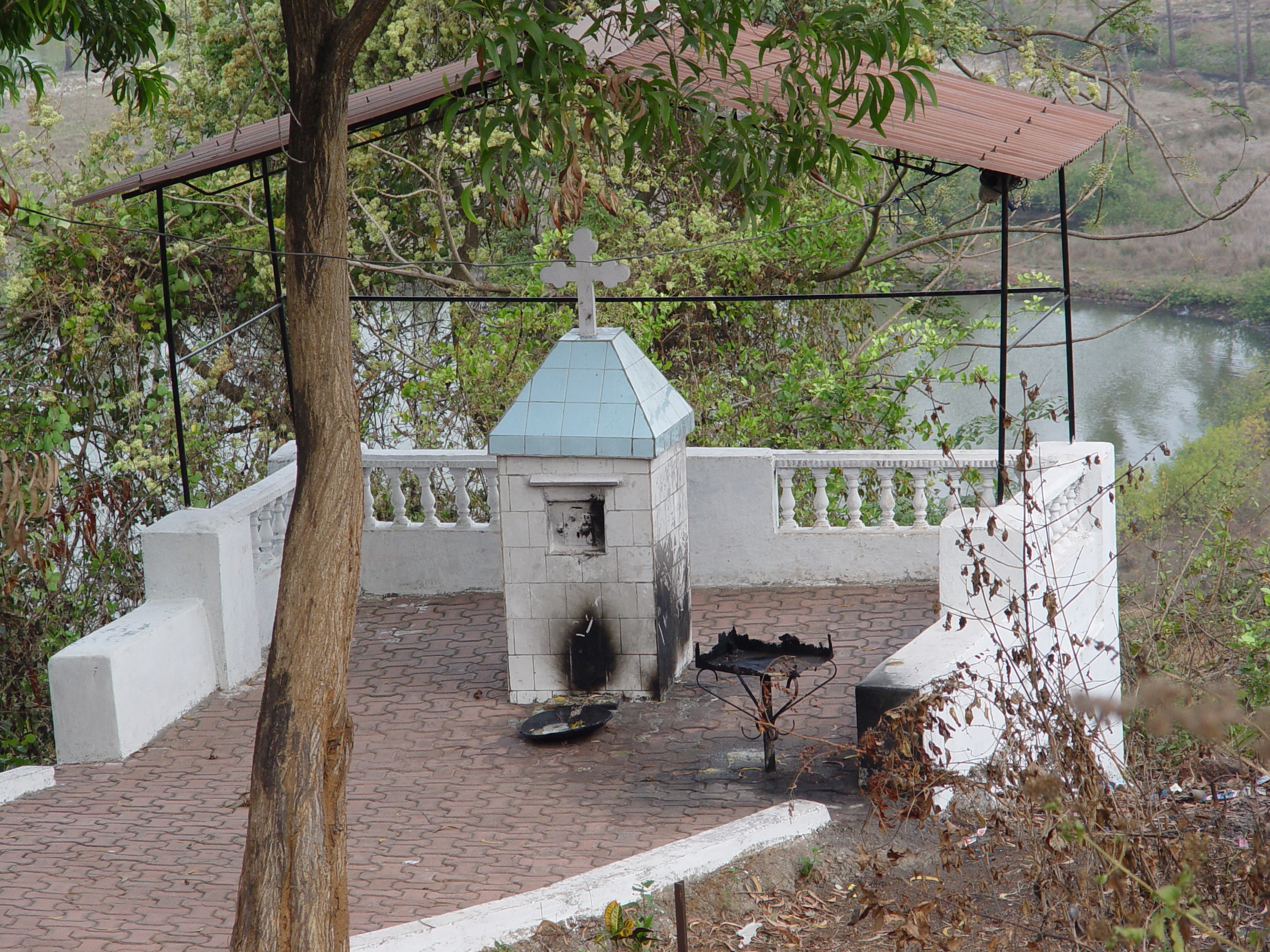
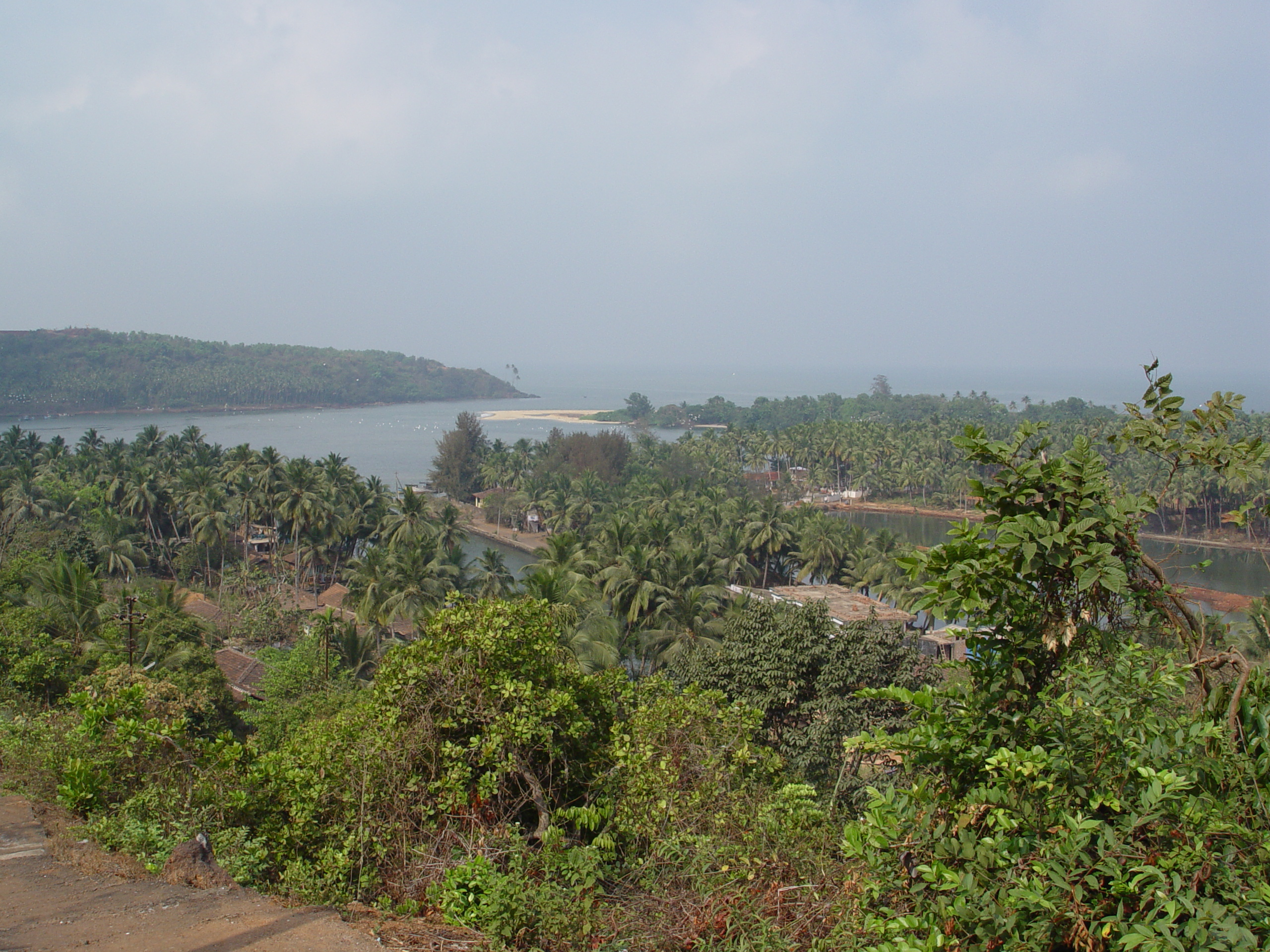
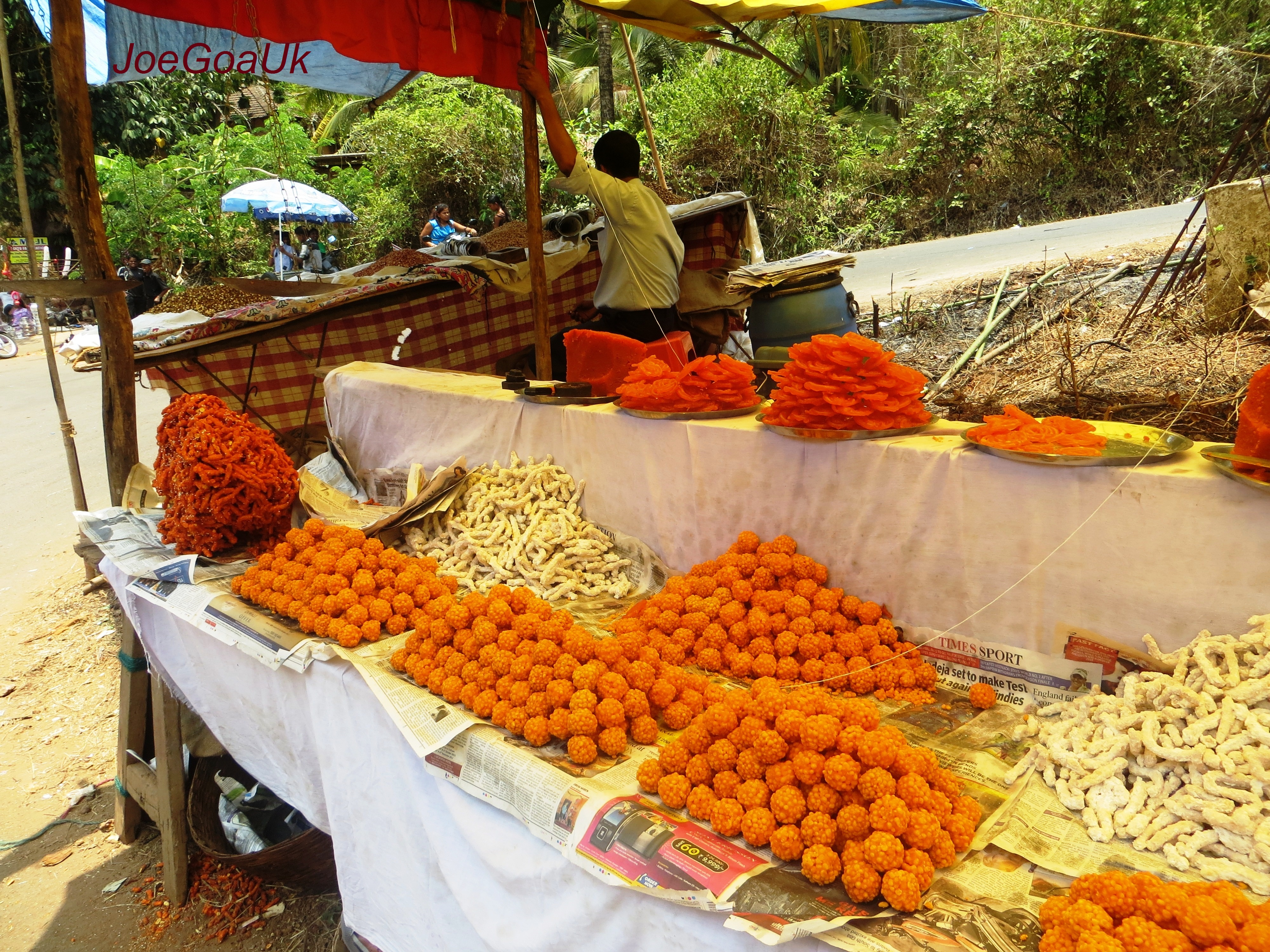
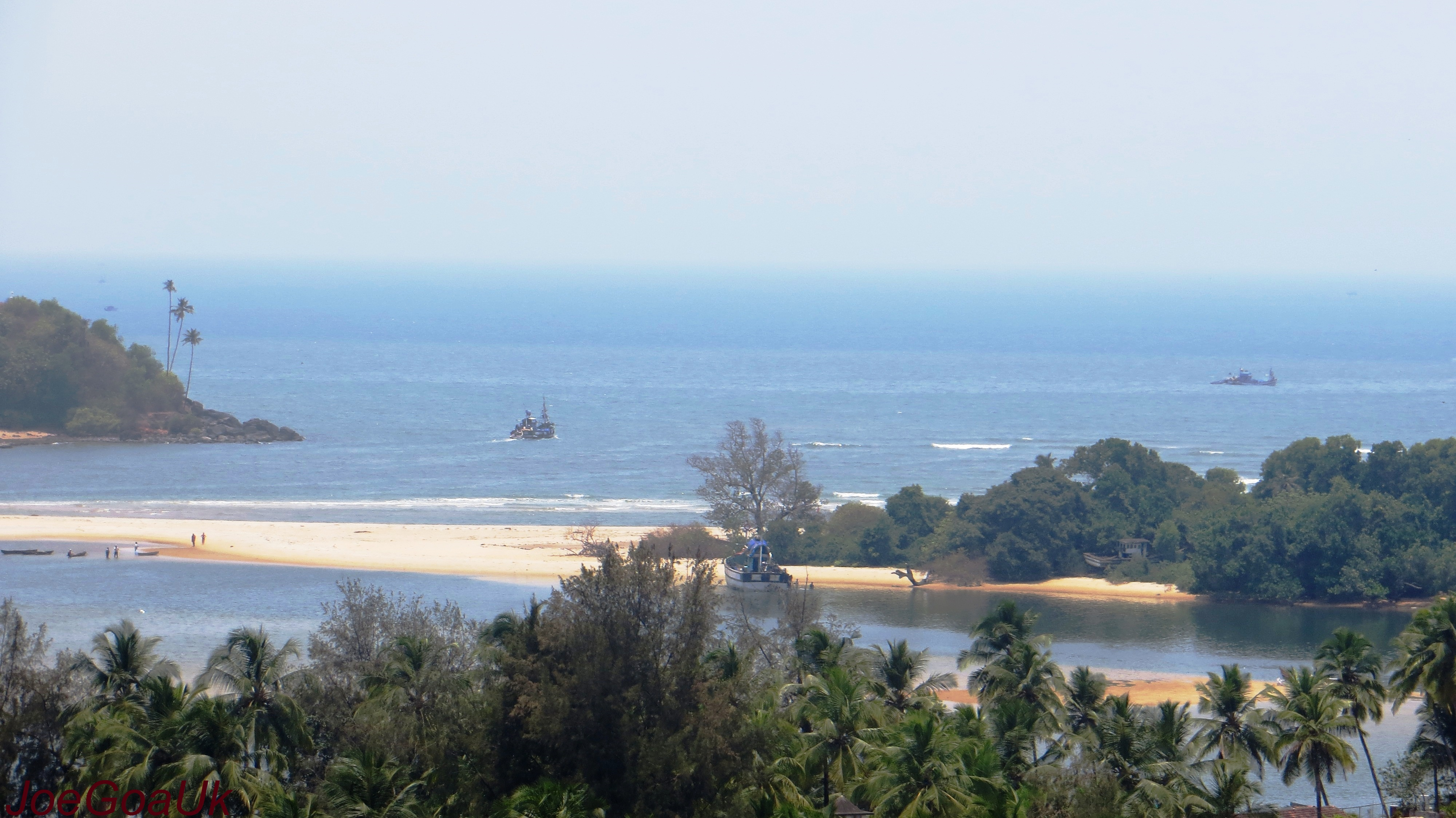
- From top, left to right: 1. Miraculous cross 2. Holy Cross Chapel; 3. Small cross located atop the hill 4. Panoramic view from the hill 5. Sweets displayed on 3 May feast 6. Panoramic view of the Betul Beach

- Location within Goa Location within India
- Coordinates: 15°8′50.34″N 73°57′27.68″E
- Country: India
- State: Goa
- District: South Goa
- Sub-district: Salcete

Government
  - Member of the Goa Legislative Assembly: Cruz Silva

Languages
  - Official: Konkani; English
  - Additional/Cultural: Romi Konkani; Portuguese
- Time zone: UTC+5:30 (IST)
- PIN: 403723
- Telephone code: 0832
- Vehicle registration: GA

Baradi (Konkani: Barade) is a scenic neighborhood located within the village of Velim, Goa, neighbouring Tollecanto and Betul. It is situated in the Salcete taluka and falls under the South Goa district, in the Indian coastal state of Goa. It is about 18 km (11 mi) away from the Margao city and is also a part of the Velim Assembly constituency. It is famous for the Miraculous Cross located atop the hill known as the Baradi Holy Cross, the feast of the cross is celebrated on 3 May, every year.

== Miraculous Cross ==
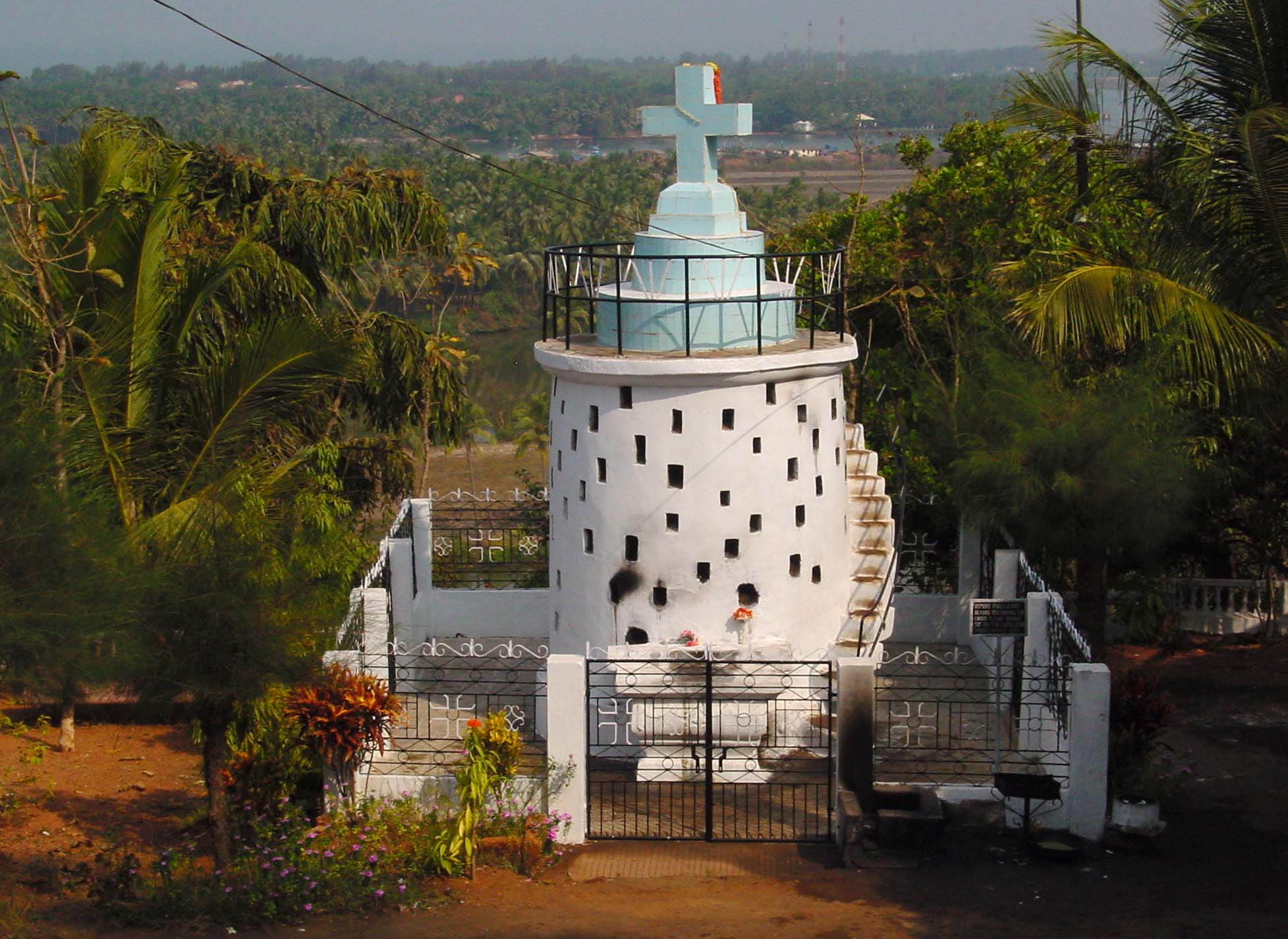
Facade of the Miraculous cross

The Baradi Holy Cross (Konkani: Baradicho Khuris), also known as the Miraculous cross, is a huge cross located on a white base atop the Baradi hill in ward VII, Velim. It provides a scenic view of the Velim, Betul, Sal river and the Arabian Sea. It is one of the two Miraculous crosses in Goa, one of which is in North Goa at Vanxim island. The cross has a staircase surrounding it which allows devotees to reach at the top, near the cross. Many are seen from across the state, irrespective of their faiths offering flower garlands, kissing the cross and lighting candles.

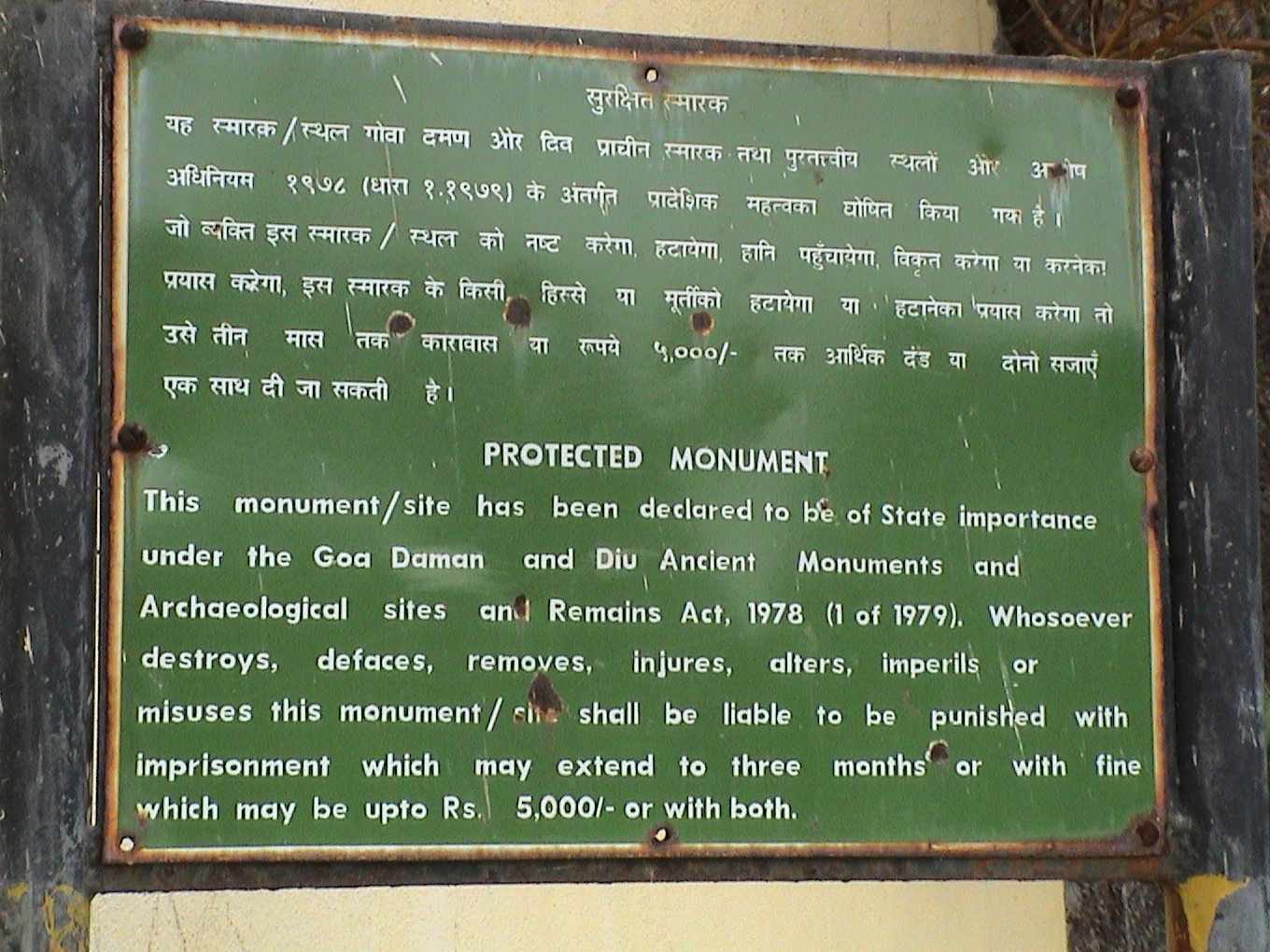
Protected monument notice

However, due to its location, there's no canopy over it, although many previous attempts had been made. According to the tradition, the devotees offer their prayer by circling around the cross thrice. As per the widespread beliefs, the nearby locals were accompanied by a brass band, in prayer and singing hymns and would take a trip to the cross by foot during the lent season. It also plays an important role in the mell procession and is also considered as a revered spot for the tourists.

=== History ===
According to the local folklore, soon after the Cuncolim massacre involving the Ganvkars at Assolna and Cuncolim in 1583, the then Portuguese government confiscated all of these villages land up to Betul. These properties were then given to Don Pedro de Crasto, he then handed out to the Paulist Fathers. In 1585, the locals of the Velim and Betul villages were converted into Christians, as a mark of their victory, the Paulists then constructed a cross, however it was later abandoned when the religious orders were suppressed in Goa.

Around the early 20th century, Fr. Simphriano Caetano Dias, the vicar of Velim parish, visioned the cross in his dream that had its pedestal wrinkled with holes and steps leading to the cross. He later made an inquiry about the same in the village. Thereafter, a Kunbi from Baradi met the priest and told him about an abandoned cross on the hill which was in ruins, since nobody visited it. The priest then took the task to cut his way up the hill where he found the cross lying under the thick cover of trees. He later cleansed the place and built a small chapel next to it, now known as the Holy Cross Chapel, Baradi.

== Holy Cross Chapel ==
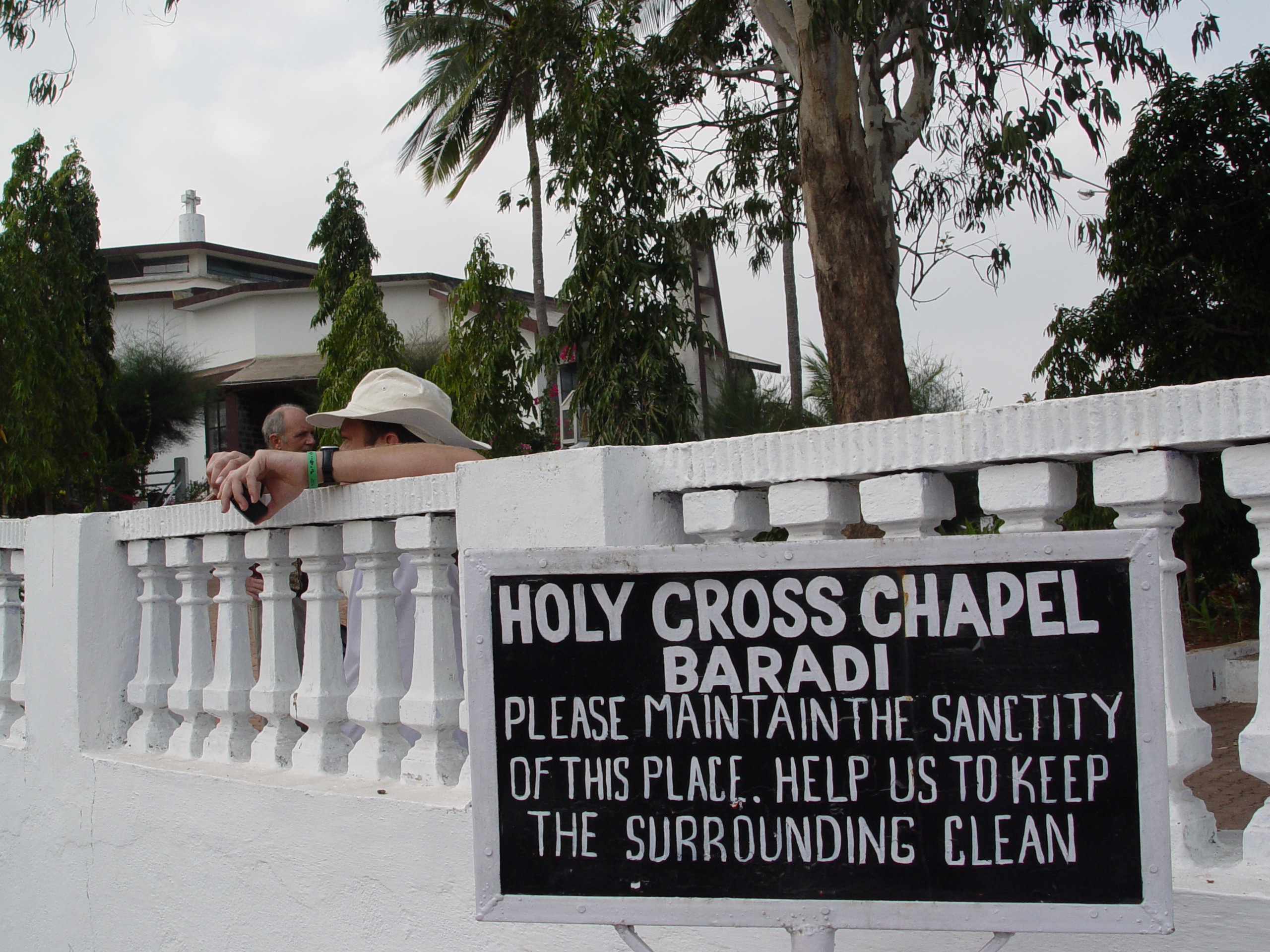
Entrance of the Holy Cross Chapel

The Holy Cross Chapel, Baradi is a small chapel located atop the hill besides the Miraculous cross. Every year on 3 May, a feast mass is celebrated.
