= St. Xavier's High School, Velim =

Co-educational school in Goa, India

St. Xavier's High School
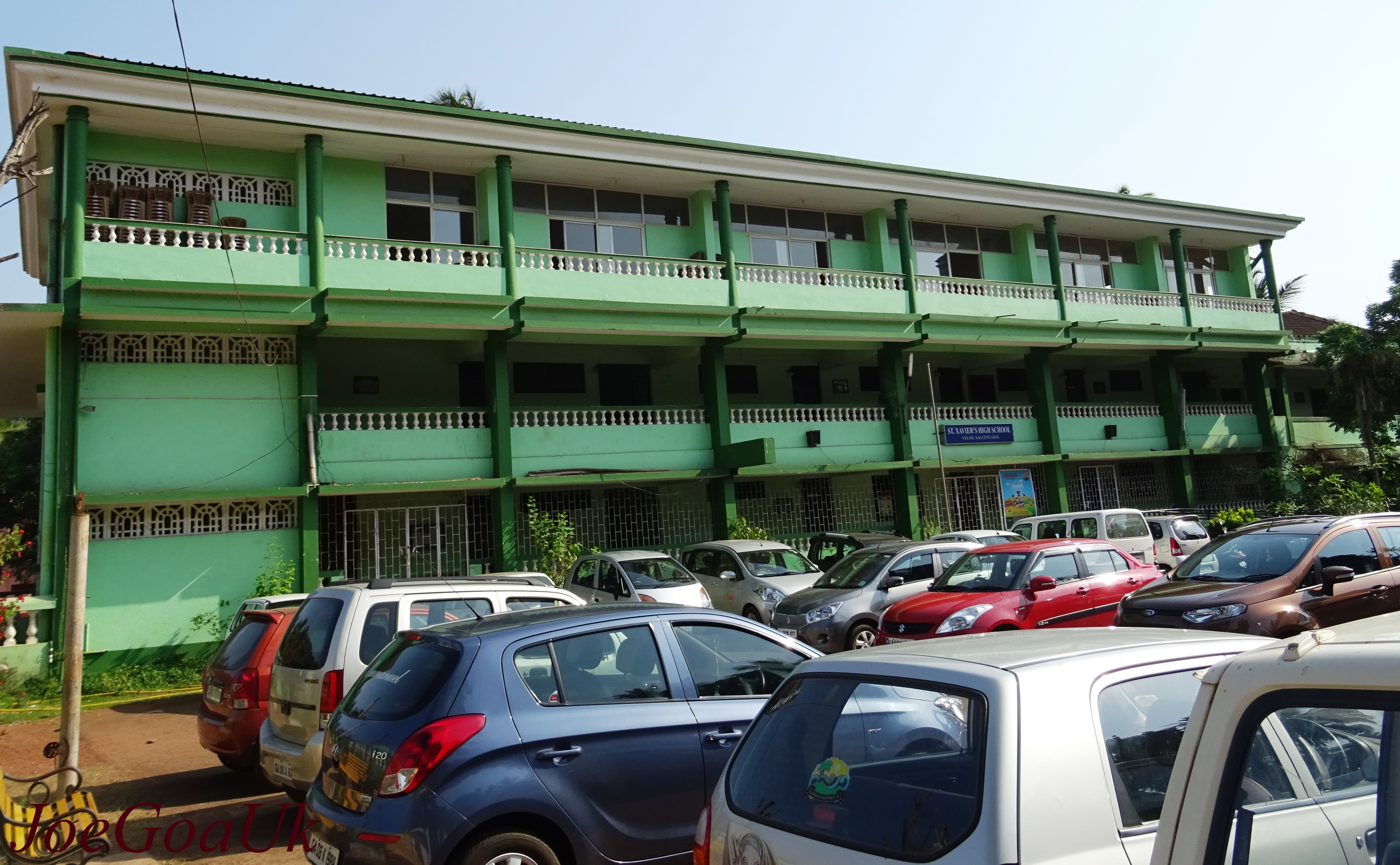
- Façade of the school, 2017

Location
- Velim, Goa, India; 403723
- Coordinates: 15.165518°N 73.974424°E

Information
- Type: Private aided (Note: may be government aided school as per) primary and secondary school
- Religious affiliation: Catholicism
- Denomination: Jesuits
- Patron saint: Francis Xavier
- Established: 1962; 64 years ago
- School board: Goa Board of Secondary and Higher Secondary Education
- School code: 30020105904 (Note: Unified District Information System for Education (UDISE) code.)
- Manager: Fr. Santo Antonio Pereira
- Headmistress: Mable Da Costa
- Gender: Co-educational
- Age range: 3–16
- Language: English
- Hours in school day: 5
- Classrooms: 10
- Campus type: Rural
- Sports: Football
- Nickname: S.X.H.S
- Affiliations: Goa Board of Secondary and Higher Secondary Education
- Last updated: 23 December 2022

St. Xavier's High School is a private aided co-educational school located in Velim village in Salcete taluka in the Indian coastal state of Goa. The school was established in 1962 and is affiliated to Goa Board of Secondary and Higher Secondary Education.

== History ==
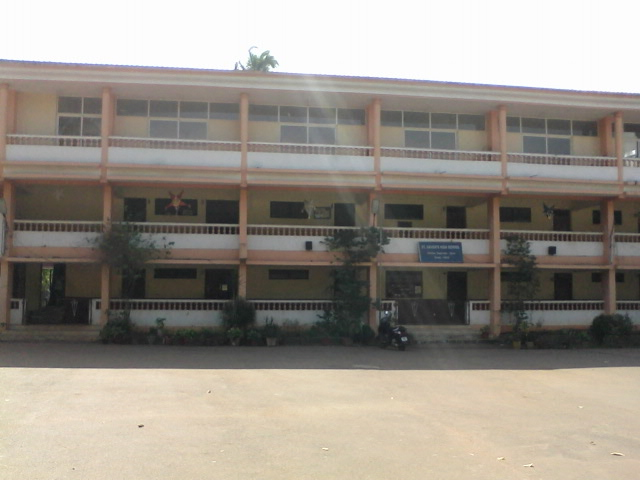
St. Xavier's High School in 2013

On 4 August 2013, the school's playground also known as Velim Fabrica ground managed to get the attention of the Government of Goa to have it renovated by the Directorate of Sports and Youth Affairs (DSYA) at an estimated cost of ₹18 lakh (equivalent to ₹31 lakh or US$32,000 in 2023). The ground is said to have been home to many footballers in the past, also being hosts of many soccer matches. The foundation stone for the development of the playground was blessed by then parish priest Fr. Jorge Pazzi Fernandes in the presence of then Velim MLA Benjamin Silva (a former footballer), then Velim sarpanch Melvyn Sanches, school's headmistress, Mabel Da Costa, members of the school playground committee and the villagers.

== Key people ==
=== Managers ===
Ordinal	Officeholder	Term start	Term end	Time in office
1	Fr. Piedade Francisco Rodrigues	1962	1964	1–2 years
2	Fr. Jose Santimano	1964	1973	8–9 years
3	Fr. Jose Maria Raimundo Pereira	1973	1979	5–6 years
4	Fr. Francisco Xavier Bossuet Sta Rita de Menezes	1979	1981	1–2 years
5	Fr. Luis Francisco do R Fernandes dos Santos	1981	1982	0–1 year
6	Fr. Nazario Antonio Santana Martins	1982	1987	4–5 years
7	Fr. Rosario Caetano Francisco Carmo de Menezes	1987	1995	7–8 years
8	Fr. Miguel Arcanjo Camilo Santana Rosario Godinho	1995	1998	2–3 years
9	Fr. Santana Carvalho	1998	2004	5–6 years
10	Fr. Geraldo Aleixo Antonio da Costa	2004	2005	0–1 year
11	Fr. Romano Jeronimo Belem Gonsalves	2005	2012	6–7 years
12	Fr. Jorge Pazzi Fernandes	2012	9 May 2021	8–9 years
13	Fr. Santo Antonio Pereira	9 May 2021	incumbent	2 years and counting

=== Headmaster/Headmistress ===
Ordinal	Officeholder	Term start	Term end	Time in office
1	Jose Vaz	? (Note: most likely joined in 1980s.)	??	??
2	Nelson Lopes	??	??	??
3	Mable Da Costa	? (Note: joined prior to 2013.)	incumbent	??

== Sports ==
The school competes at inter-school and taluka and state-level football competitions. On 17 December 2015, St. Xavier's High School lost to Rosary High School, Navelim by a 2–1 defeat in the All Goa Inter-School Under 17 Invitational Football Tournament at Chinchinim Church ground. The tournament was held in remembrance and honour of St. Joseph Vaz and was organised by Mount Mary's School and Higher Secondary School.

On 27 December 2015, St. Xavier's High School was among the 16 schools, including St. Britto High School that were adopted in the FC Goa outreach programme. The programme was designed to create a safe space so that the club would reach out to as many young kids and introduce them to football in a friendly playing environment where they were encouraged to develop their inherent talent while also enjoying the sport.

On 28 June 2017, St. Xavier's High School beat Our Lady of Carmel High School, Curtorim by a 3–1 victory to qualify along with three other schools including Loyola High School in the U-14 inter-school Salcete taluka boys football tournament organized by Directorate of Sports and Youth Affairs (DSYA) at Fatorda. On 29 June 2017, they defeated St Jude’s High School, Betalbatim at Manora ground, Raia by a 2–0 victory to qualify in the next round of the tournament along with four other schools from Goa.

On 15 November 2017, St. Xavier's High School managed to qualify in the semi-finals of Fr Peter SVD Memorial football tournament, they were beaten by Marina English High School, Verna in a 5–0 defeat at SVD Seminary, Raia ground.

On 22 February 2018, St. Xavier's High School qualified in the playoffs of 1st teacher Dolorosa memorial U-17 girls football tournament and were teamed up against Perpetual Succour Convent High School, Navelim, they were then beaten by a 4–3 defeat via a tie-breaker at Chandor ground.

On 25 July 2018, St. Xavier's High School were beaten by Rosary High School, Navelim in a 5–0 defeat of the U-17 Subroto Mukherjee Salcete Taluka girls football tournament which was organised by the DSYA, at Pandit Jawaharlal Nehru Stadium.

On 27 August 2018, St. Xavier's High School beat Infant Jesus High School, Colva by a 3–2 victory via a tie-breaker to be crowned as the champions in the third edition of All Goa OLHESA inter-school football tournament which was organised by Our Lady of Health Ex Students Association, at Cuncolim School ground, Cuncolim.

On 16 July 2022, St. Francis Xavier High School were among the five schools, including Regina Martyrum High School to qualify in U-14 Subroto Mukherjee Inter-School Salcete Taluka football tournament organised by DSYA at village school ground, Dramapur. Their win came after they defeated Our Lady of Succour High School by four goals.

On 27 July 2022, St. Xavier's High School was among the three schools in Goa to be qualified in the U-17 Salcete taluka inter-school Subroto Mukherjee football tournament held at Cuncolim School ground, at Cuncolim.

== COVID vaccination drive ==
On 27 May 2021, a two-day COVID-19 vaccination drive was held at the school for people aged 45 and above by the Government of Goa for their initiative of the Tika Utsav. In total, 205 individuals received their first jab with 95 of them being vaccinated on the first day and 110 individuals the next day.

== Civic and consumer forum ==
On 21 April 2013, the Velim Civic and Consumer Forum (VCCF) held its monthly meeting of consumers at the school, wherein several issues were discussed upon such as World Health Day, Earth Day, price rise, notice of directorate of transport and bus fare hike, Right to education (RTE), taxation of wells, Liquefied petroleum gas and its transparency, violence against women, and the special Gram Sabha. Public utilities like Goa Dairy, postal services, Public Works Department water, banking and BSNL were also taken into consideration.

On 10 August 2014, the VCCF held its general monthly meeting of consumers at the school. The issues that were discussed were gram sabha proposals, vector-borne diseases awareness, screening of migrants at Cutbona, breast feeding and nutrition campaign, HIV/AIDS, garbage management etc.

== Notable alumni ==
- Nevel Gracias, Indian diocesan priest and actor

== See also ==
- List of schools in Goa
- Education in Goa
