= St. Francis Xavier Church, Velim =

Roman Catholic church in Goa, India

St. Francis Xavier Church
- Velim Church
- Portuguese: Sao Francisco Igreja
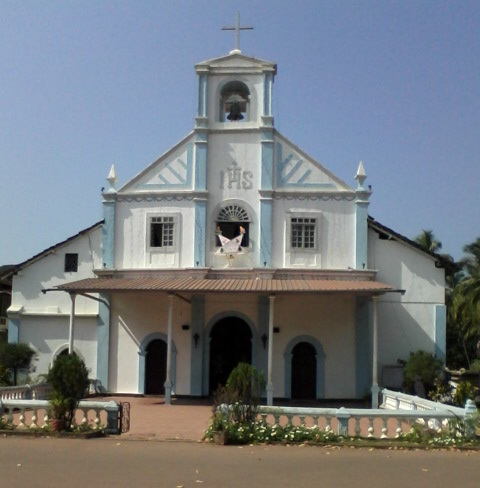
- Façade of the church, 2013
- St. Francis Xavier Church
- 15°9′56.6″N 73°58′26.8″E
- Location: Velim, Goa, India
- Denomination: Catholic
- Sui iuris church: Latin Church
- Tradition: Roman Rite

History
- Status: Parish church
- Founded: 29 September 1805; 220 years ago
- Dedicated: St. Francis Xavier

Architecture
- Functional status: Active
- Style: Mannerist, Neo-Roman

Administration
- Archdiocese: Roman Catholic Archdiocese of Goa and Daman

Clergy
- Priest: Fr. Leonardo Morais; Fr. Warren Pereira

The St Francis Xavier Church (Portuguese: Sao Francisco Igreja), also known as Velim Church, is a Roman Catholic church in Velim, Goa, India.

== History ==
Before 1771, a chapel stood at the site and functioned under the jurisdiction of the Our Lady of Queen of Martyrs Church in Assolna. It remained subordinate to that parish until 29 September 1805, when it was granted independent church status.

A local tradition associates the area with the missionary activities of St. Francis Xavier in the sixteenth century. According to these accounts, Xavier arrived at Cabo de Rama by sea and later travelled to Velim, situated about 14 km (8.7 mi) inland. While he is said to have succeeded in converting some inhabitants to Catholicism, members of the village's blacksmith community reportedly opposed his efforts and compelled him to depart. As a result, he came to be venerated as the patron saint of Velim.

Another local tradition attributes the church's name and patronage to members of the Barros and Colaco families who are believed to have migrated to Velim from Old Goa and Carambolim following an outbreak of plague in those areas. According to this account, the settlers placed the church under the patronage of St. Francis Xavier.

The church marked the bicentenary of its elevation to parish status in 2005. In 2012, restoration work was undertaken on the main altar, which included the reinstatement of a statue of St. Francis Xavier at its centre.

== Parish ==
The church is led by parish priest Fr. Leonardo Morais and assistant parish priest Fr. Warren Pereira.

=== Timings ===
The church is open every day, but the office is closed on Sundays. Mass is celebrated in Konkani every day at 6:45 AM and 7:30 AM. On Saturdays, Mass is held at 5:30 PM. On Sundays, Mass timings are 6:30 AM, 8:00 AM, and 9:15 AM, with the 9:15 AM Mass being a catechumenal children's Mass.

== Feast ==
Among Goan churches, it is one of the few that commemorates the feast day of its patron saint on 3 December each year.

== 2012 Velim church attack ==
In February 2012, the church was raided by members of the Election Flying Squad and officials from the Income Tax Department after allegations that cash intended for voter inducement in the forthcoming 2012 Goa Legislative Assembly election was being kept on the premises. The investigation included questioning the parish priest at the time, Fr. Romano Gonsalves. The search did not uncover any substantial evidence.

Several weeks later, officers from the Goa Police, including three personnel from the Criminal Investigation Department (CID), visited the church to question the parish priest in connection with the matter. During the visit, a crowd of about 1,500 parishioners gathered at the site, and five police officers, including the three CID personnel, were reportedly assaulted. Subsequently, 22 individuals were named as accused in the case. Among those charged were Fr. Romano Gonsalves and Fr. Lucio Dias, who was then the parish priest of Our Lady of Queen of Martyrs Church, Assolna, and the Episcopal Vicar for South Goa.

In October 2025, the Judicial Magistrate First Class (JMFC) court in Margao acquitted all the accused in the case, citing a lack of evidence to support the charges.

== Present day ==
In 2012, parish priest Jorge Fernandes reported that the parish had approximately 8,000 registered members, although regular local participation was limited. He attributed this to outward migration, noting that many houses remained unoccupied for much of the year and that parishioners returned primarily during holidays, weekends, and for family or religious occasions such as weddings and funerals.
