= Antonio Piedade da Cruz =

Indian painter and sculptor (1895–1982)

Antonio Piedade da Cruz (22 August 1895 – 1982) was an Indian painter and sculptor.

== Early life ==
Antonio Piedade da Cruz was born on 22 August 1895 in the village of Velim in then Portuguese India and joined Bombay's Sir Jamsetjee Jeejebhoy School of Art in 1916. Cruz studied under Gladstone Salomon, M. V. Dhurandhar and Agoskar, and graduated in 1920. He went on to study in Europe, applied to the Berlin University of the Arts and won a scholarship and the status of "Master Student" (Meisterschüler). He studied there from 1922 under Arthur Kampf, Ferdinand Spiegel and Paul Plontke.

== Career ==
Cruzo caught the attention of the Portuguese Ambassador in Berlin when he, after a German newspaper described him as "Portuguese from India", asked the paper to rectify, insisting that he was "pure Indian". With the support of the Ambassador, Cruzo held his first solo exhibition in Lisbon in October 1925. He returned to India following a request by the Maharaja of Travancore.

Cruzo settled in Bombay and became well known as a sculptor and portrait painter both among Indian royalty and the expatriate elite. Among the people who sat for his portraits were Philip Chetwode, Louis Mountbatton, Lallubhai Samaldas and Purshottamdas Thakurdas.

His "Cruzo Studio" in Brabourne Stadium became an important meeting place, including for members of the Goa liberation movement. Despite Cruzo's entries with the rich and famous, his main work focused on poverty and social injustice as well as hard-working farmers and fishermen. He also painted colourful allegories and nudes.

A meeting with Mahatma Gandhi gave Cruzo fresh inspiration and from then onwards, political themes dominated his work, first the struggle for independence, partition and later the Bangladesh Liberation War and the Vietnam War. Cruzo died in 1982 but remains one of Goa's most notable artists.

After years of oblivion, Cruzo's work is being rediscovered. In 2016, Ranjit Hoskote curated an exhibition of 16 oil paintings by Cruzo at the Sunaparanta, Goa Centre for the Arts and a website was set up to gather existing media and information about the artist.
