= Nevel Gracias =

Indian Catholic priest and playwright (1964–2022)

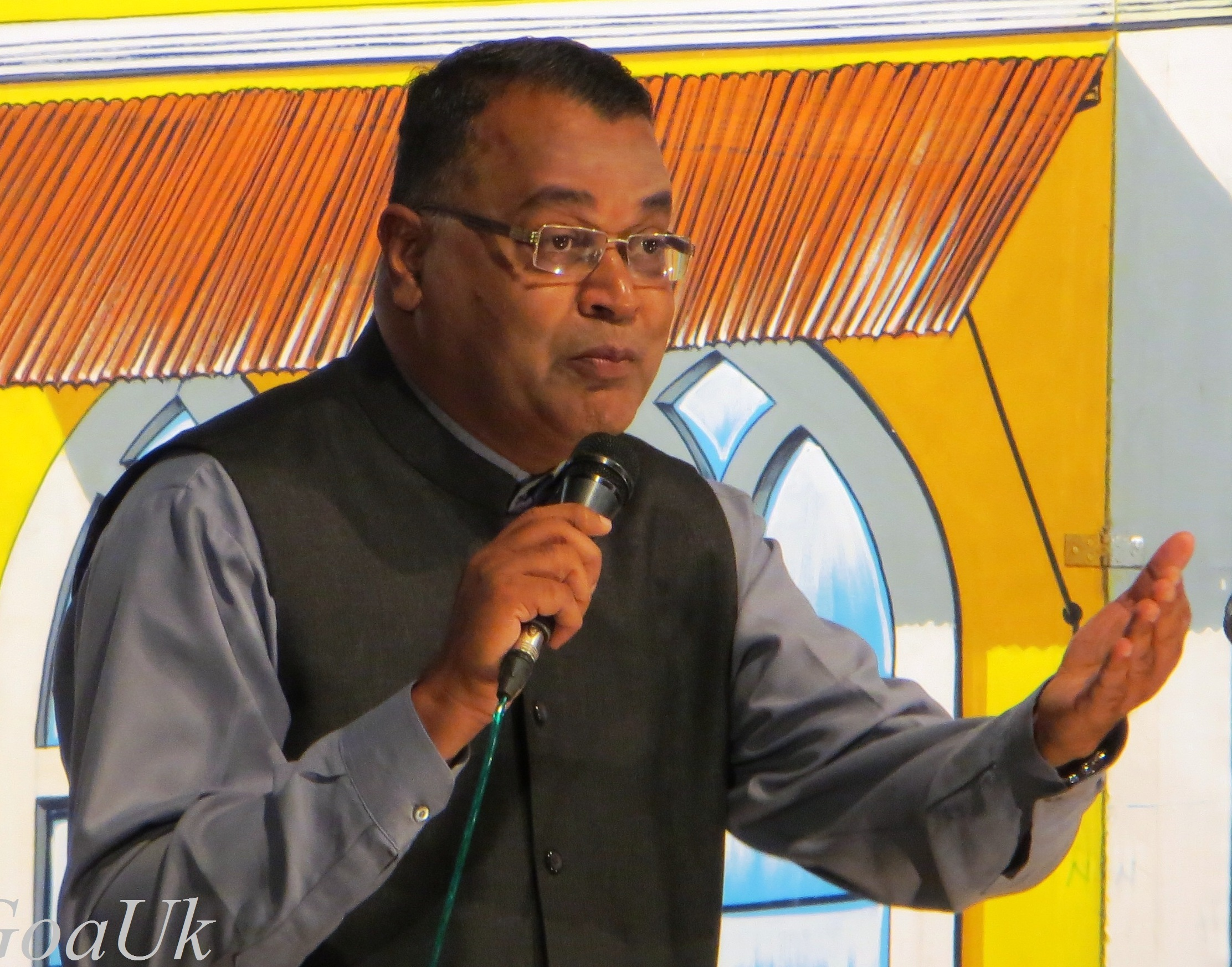
- Gracias during a tiatr production, 2013
- Born: Nevel Lourdes Sacramento Gracias; 11 February 1964; Velim, Goa, India
- Died: 13 May 2022 (aged 58); Porvorim, Goa, India
- Burial place: St. Francis Xavier Church cemetery, Velim, Goa, India
- Other name: Fr. Nevel Gracias
- Education: St. Xavier's High School (S.S.C.); Rachol Seminary
- Occupations: Actor; singer; composer; director; playwright; editor; catholic priest
- Years active: 1976–2022
- Church: Roman Catholic Church
- Other posts: Spiritual director of the Legion of Mary of Loutolim Curia; Parochial administrator of the Parish of Chaudi, Canacona (1999–2000); Spiritual director of the Legion of Mary of Canacona Curia; Dean of Canacona deanery (2004–2006); Assistant director of Lar de Santa Terezinha (2007–2009); Assistant director of the Diocesan Catechetical Center; Director of Lay apostolate

Orders
- Ordination: 30 April 1991 by Raul Nicolau Gonçalves
- Rank: Diocesan priest

Nevel Lourdes Sacramento Gracias (11 February 1964 – 13 May 2022) was an Indian Catholic priest, playwright, actor, singer, composer, director, and literary editor who primarily worked on the Konkani stage, best known for his lenten tiatrs. He was regarded as a one-man show and served in the general council of the Tiatr Academy of Goa.

== Career ==
=== Priesthood ===
Gracias was described as a diligent altar server who aspired to be a priest. He joined at Rachol Seminary in June 1984. Through his years at the seminary his love for tiatrs and volleyball persisted. He was ordained as a priest on 30 April 1991 at St Francis Xavier's Church in Velim by then, Archbishop Emeritus Raul Nicolau Gonçalves. He served as an assistant to parish priest at the parishes of Taleigao and Piedade in Divar.

In 1996, he was appointed as an assistant parish priest of Loutolim and later went on to be the Spiritual director of the Legion of Mary of Loutolim Curia. Gracias was assigned as the Parochial administrator of the Parish of Chaudi in Canacona in 1999. He was then made the Spiritual director of the Legion of Mary of Canacona Curia, within a year of his service he was appointed as the parish priest. In 2004 he was assigned as the Dean of Canacona deanery.

In 2006, Gracias was appointed as the parish priest of Our Lady of Lourdes Church, Utorda but within a year, he was summoned back due to his health issues. In 2007, he was promoted to Assistant director of Lar de Santa Terezinha, two years later in 2009 he was appointed as an Assistant director of the Diocesan Catechetical Center and then later as a Director of Lay apostolate, where he was an editor for religious bi-monthly booklets, Jivitacho Prokas and Daily Flash, that included daily reflections on the word of God. Gracias also served in the parishes of Tivim, Panjim and Caranzalem.

In 2014, Gracias was then assigned to St. Diogo Parish in Guirim-Sangolda, but due to his declining health he was summoned back in 2018. He was then sent to a clergy home (Portuguese: Lar Dos Sacerdotes), at Casa Urbina in Porvorim and resided there till his death.

=== Tiatrs ===
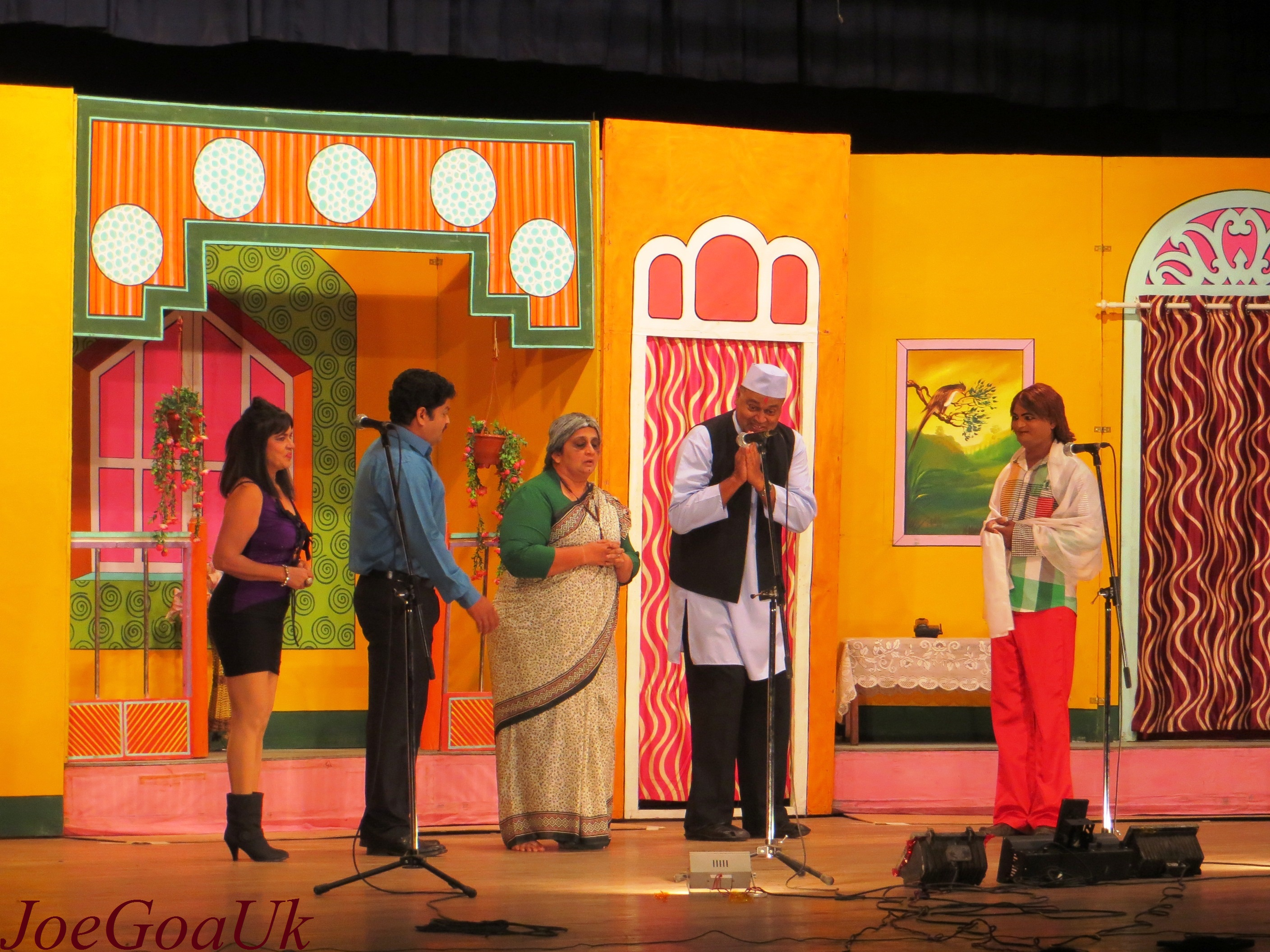
From left; Felcy, Tari, Chitra, Gracias and Comedian Michael performing at Maim Tuka Khoim Sodum? tiatr in September 2013

Gracias had a keen interest for tiatrs since the young age of 9. He didn't have a smooth start at his initial career on the Konkani stage but would keep up a positive zeal. He wrote the script for his first tiatr, "Ek rukachim tin follam" at the age of 12 in 1976, it didn't help him succeed as he had to face many hardships but it didn't let his love for tiatrs die down. He took part at a local seniors auditions that were selecting casts and singers for a village tiatr. He went on to perform many traditional songs.

Unfortunately young Gracias couldn't secure a spot for himself at the auditions and was never told why he was rejected. This didn't let him down, on the contrary he continued with his work, showcasing tiatrs in a distinguished and unique perspective. Gracias initially chose the Konkani stage as a medium to spread the word of God. He didn't intend to start out his tiatrs based on lenten or having religious concepts, instead his initial tiatrs storylines were based on family values, women's liberation, patriotism, and social life.

Since 1997 Gracias started with his lenten plays that drew mass attention mainly at the village church squares during the 43 days lenten season. He presented all of these tiatrs under the "Vell’lekar Nirmiti" banner and shared little of his profits to charity. Prior to his death, he told Times of India that "the tiatr medium is more impactful than preaching", as it helps convey a strong message to mass audiences since it's a visual form of art, it's more effective.

In a career span of more than 45 years as a dramatist, Gracias has written and staged about 47 tiatrs and 24 lenten plays. His last show, "Tim Dogaim Ek Zatolim" was staged just before the COVID-19 pandemic, two years later in 2022, the same production was rescheduled in villages and completed 25 shows. "Mhaka Nitoll Kor", his silver jubilee show was scheduled in the next lent season in 2023 which included noted tiatrist, Prince Jacob in a stiff role.

On 6 January 2009, Gracias was nominated as the council member of Tiatr Academy of Goa. He was a script judge at the Kala Academy's 42nd tiatr ‘A’ group competition. He was also a regular contributor in writing for articles, Vauraddeancho Ixtt, Dor Mhoineachi Rotti, Gulab and Renovacao. Until his death in 2022, Gracias has composed over 300 songs that were featured in his lenten plays. He has also published a book, Goychem Kantar (Konknni Kantaram), which includes 354 songs of various categories, lyrics were written by Gracias and music done by Nolvert Cota.

== Personal life ==
Nevel Lourdes Sacramento Gracias was born on 11 February 1964 in the ward of Naik-Caiero in the village of Velim, Goa. He completed his primary and high school education at St. Francis Xavier High School, Velim. He later graduated from Damodar College of Commerce, Margao. Gracias had one of his leg below the knee amputated due to diabetes in 2006 and was bedridden at Goa Medical College in Bambolim, however ensured that his lenten tiatrs saw the light of the day.

== Awards ==
In July 2013, Gracias was awarded the "Gulab Award" as the Best director for his work in "Taka Khursar Mar" in the tiatr category. The same year he was the recipient of "Maria Afonso Konknni Puroskar" for his contributions in the Romi Konkani language.

In 2020, Gracias was awarded the "Gulab Award" as the Gulab writer of the year.

In 2021, he was awarded the "Dalgado Konkani Academy Award" for the year 2020 in the cultural category.

== Death ==
Gracias ailing to his health died in his sleep from an apparent heart attack at the clergy home, Casa Urbina in Porvorim, aged 58.

=== Reactions ===
Mario Menezes, a tiatr director expressed his condolences via a social media post and wrote that he was sad and shocked to hear the news of Gracias's sudden demise and further stated that he was a great priest, actor, singer, composer, writer and director, a great friend and advisor. Rupesh Jogle, who played the role as an acting director while Gracias was bedridden said that one of Gracias's special traits was that he would work with a small troupe of 8 artists and get them do everything from biblical scenes, songs and regular roles. He also states that Gracias managed the tiatr so well that none of his cast felt any burden while working with him.

== Selected stage works ==
Year	Title	Role	Ref
1976	Ek Rukachim Tin Follam	Writer	
2011	Mhojea Somia Ani Mhojea Deva	Director & Actor	
2013	Taka Khursar Mar	Writer, Director & Actor	
2014	Dhorm Porgottnnar Za	Writer & Director	
2015	Devachem Tem Devak Diyat	Director	
	Amche Ghorabe Kosbeleat?		
	Dev Kallzant Asa		
	Futtleli Boxi		
	Hanv Taka Vollkhoch Nam		
	Hi Porza Onttanim Vakhanntta		
	Hi Tuji Avoi		
	Hi vatt khursachi		
	Ho Amcho Bhavart		
	Khursachem Zoit		
	Koxtt Ani Sontos		
	Maim Tuka Khoim Sodum?		
	Mhaka Tan Laglea		
	Mhojea Mogant Ravat		
	Mon’xa, Tum Dhull		
	Oniticheo Sanklleo Moddat		
	Padri Mogan Poddla…		
	Patki Bhagevont		
	Tallnent Poddunk Dium Naka		
	Tim Dogaim Ek Zatolim		
	To Amche Pasot Mela		
	Tuji Khuxi Zaum	Director	
	Tuji Xokti Dhi		
	Tumche Khatir Roddat		
	Voch… Anik Patok Korum Naka		
