= Velim, Goa =

Velim Vellem
- Village
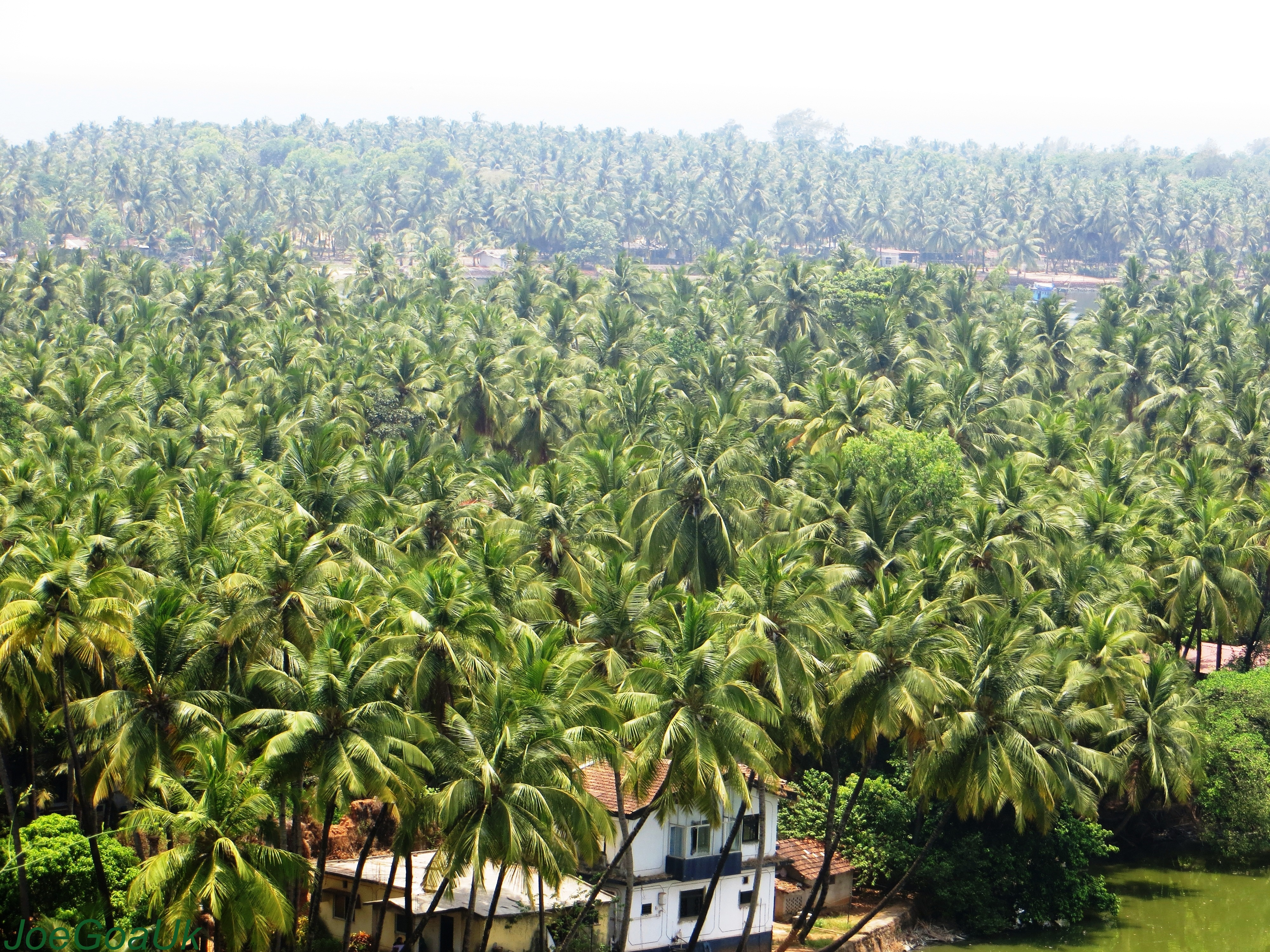
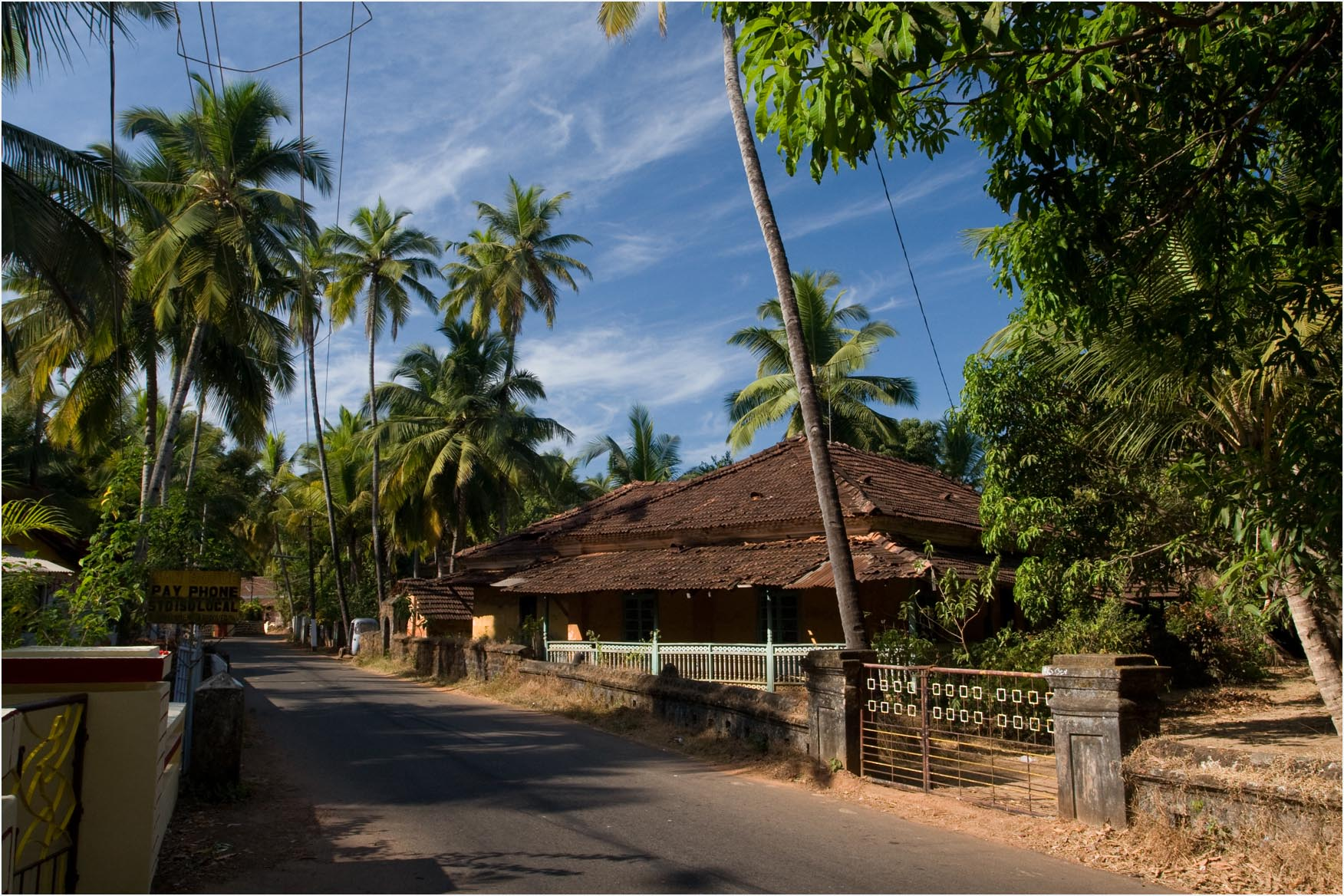
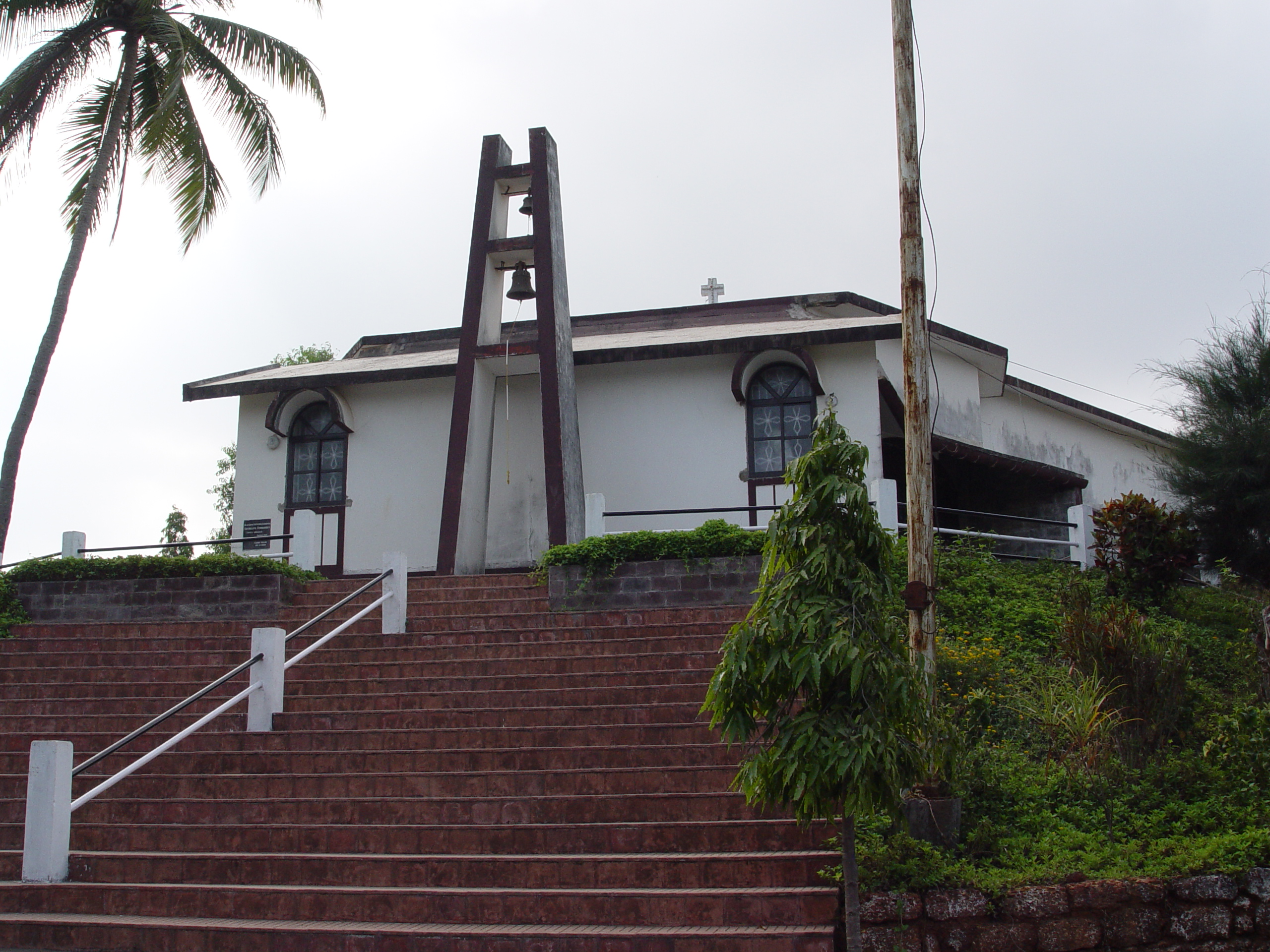
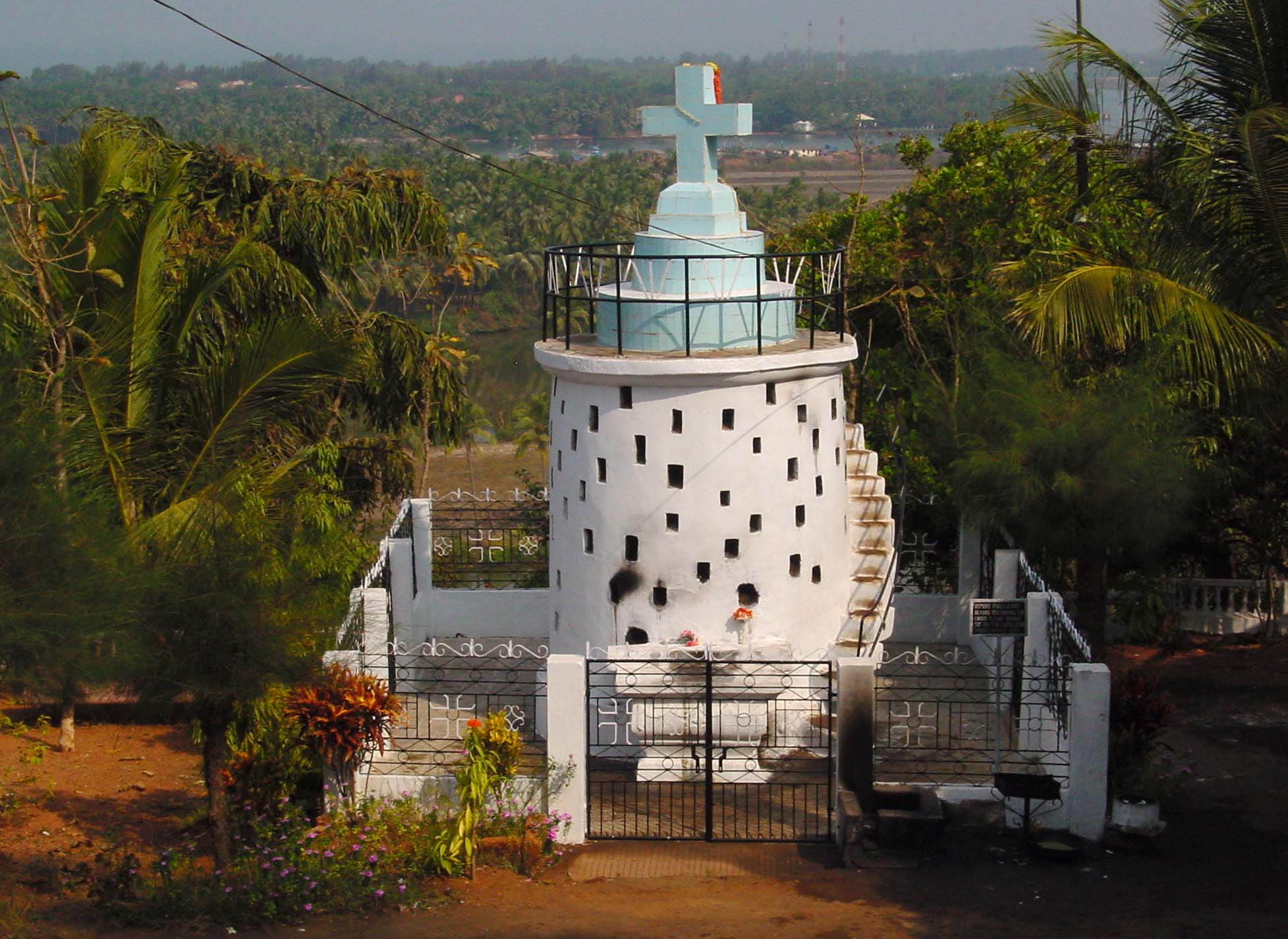
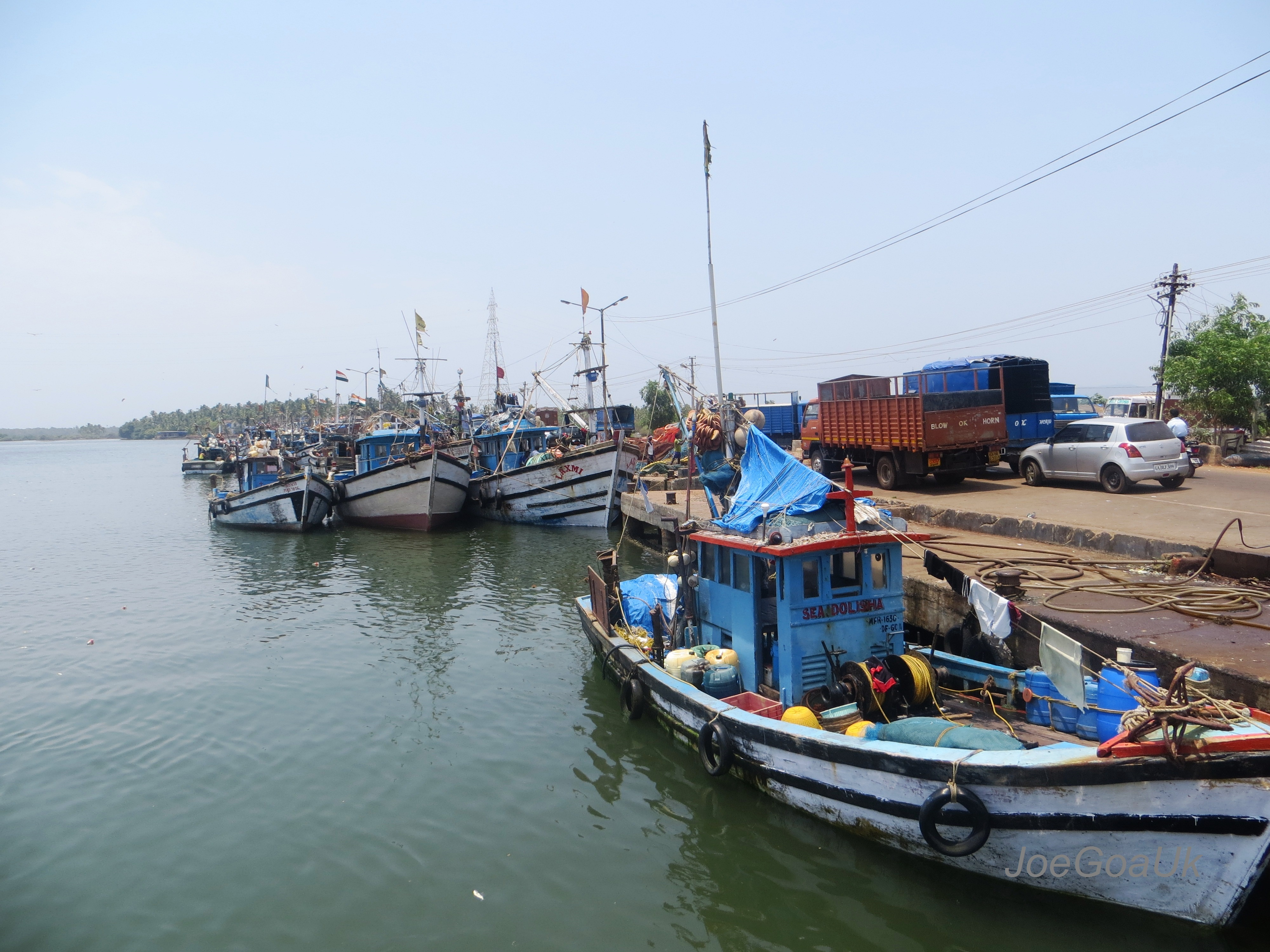
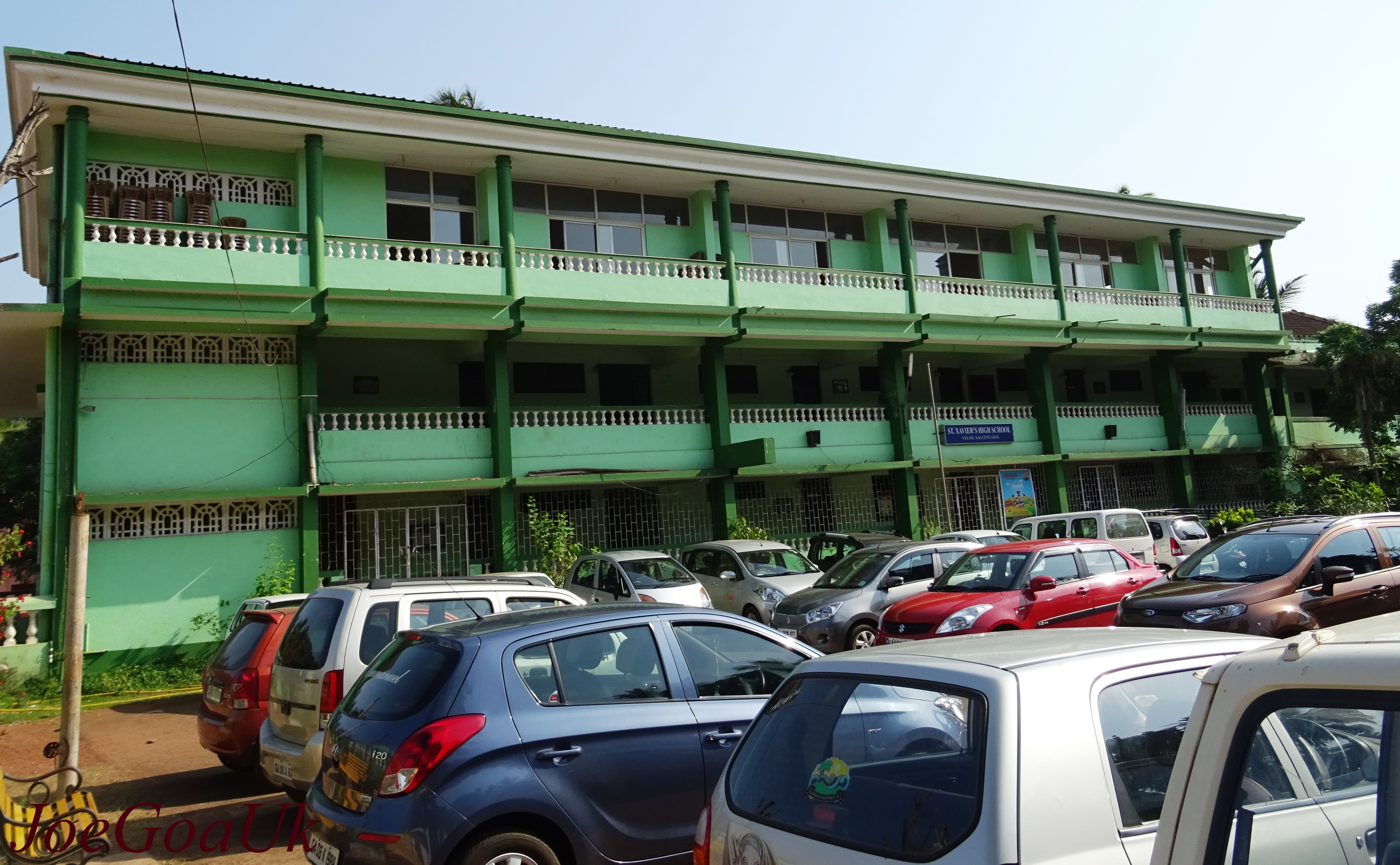
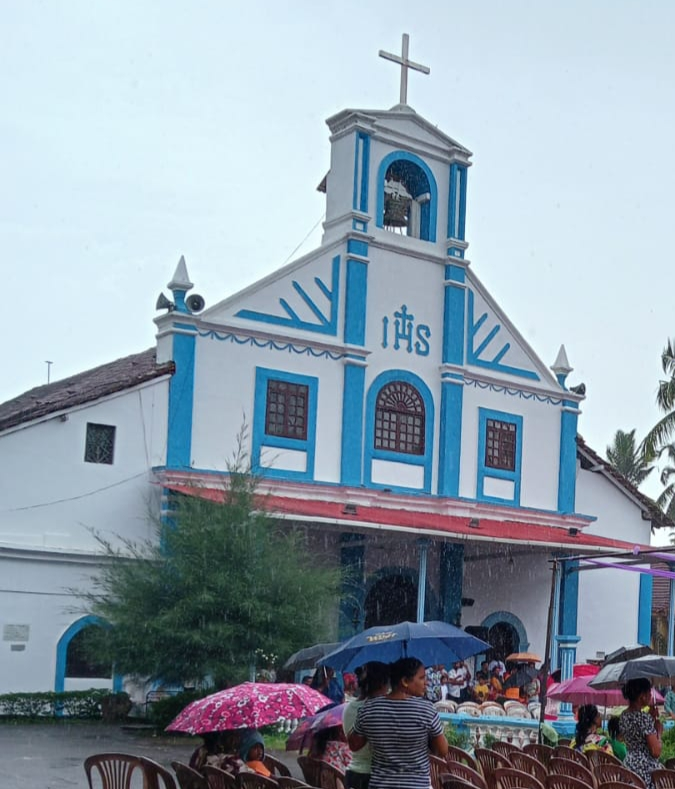
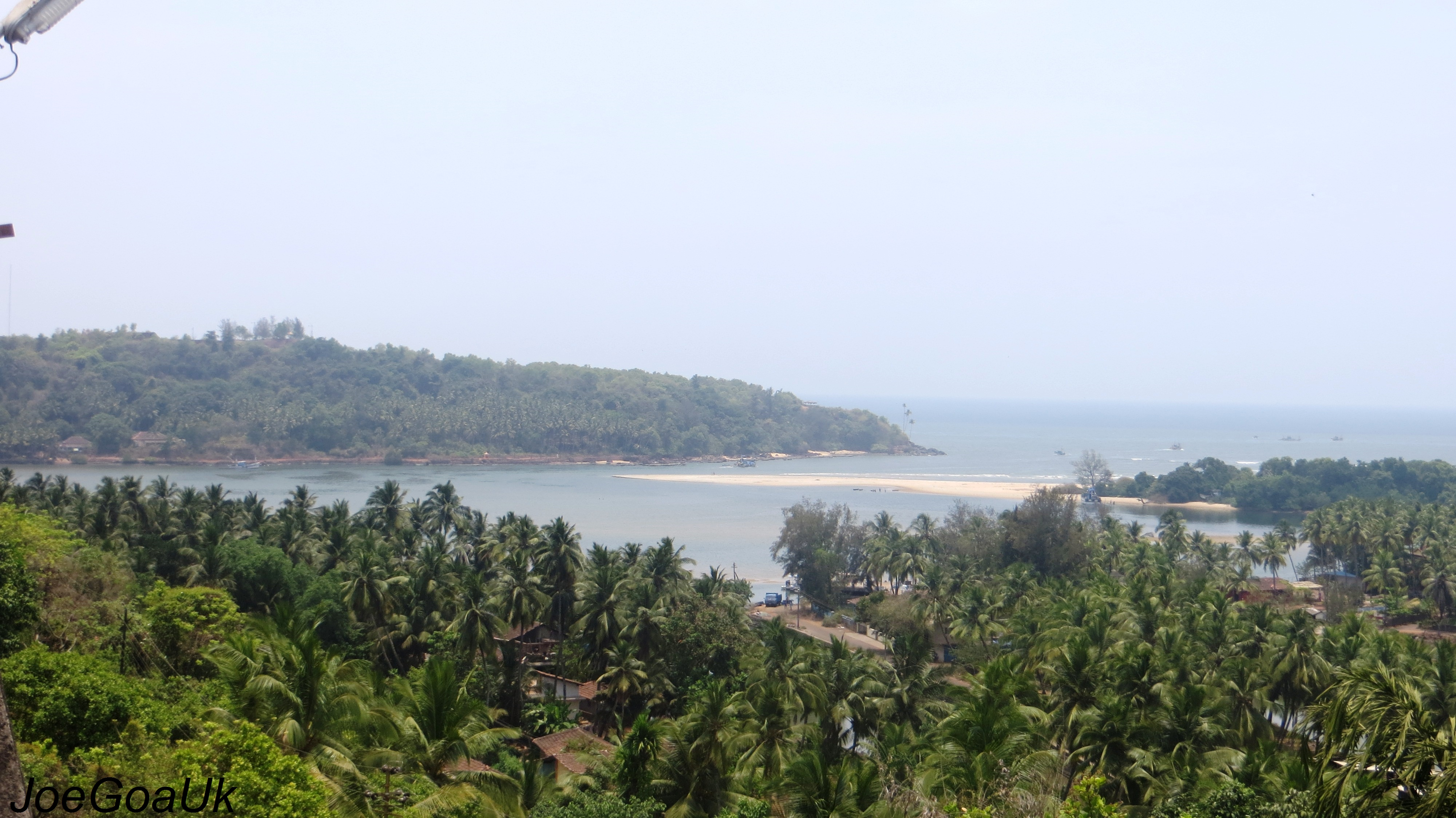
- From top, left to right: 1. Aerial view from Baradi chapel, Velim; 2. Photograph of residential houses 3. Holy Cross Chapel, Baradi; 4. Miraculous Cross, Baradi; 5. Cutbona Jetty; 6. St. Xavier's High School; 7. St. Francis Xavier Church; 8. Betul-Mobor beach view
- Nickname: Sleepy fishing village
- Location in Goa Location in India
- Coordinates: 15.1644°N 73.9759°E
- Country: India
- State: Goa
- District: South Goa
- Sub-district: Salcete

Government
  - Type: Zilla Panchayat; Gram panchayat
  - Body: Zilla Parishad; Village Panchayat
  - Member of the Goa Legislative Assembly: Cruz Silva (AAP)
  - Member of the Zilla Panchayat: Julio Fernandes (INC)
  - Sarpanch: Veena Cardozo (INC)
  - Deputy Sarpanch: Anthony Rebello

Area
  - Total: 8.14 km^{2} (3.14 sq mi)
- Elevation: 18 m (59 ft)

Population (2020)
  - Total: 8,600
  - Density: 1,100/km^{2} (2,700/sq mi)
- Demonym: Velicar/Velimcar

Languages
  - Official: Konkani; English
  - Additional/Cultural: Romi Konkani; Portuguese
- Time zone: UTC+5:30 (IST)
- PIN: 403723
- Telephone code: 0832
- Vehicle registration: GA
- Website: vpvelim.in

Velim (English: /veɪliːm/; formerly known as Velliapura – the official name until 1310 CE) is a large village situated in Salcete, neighbouring Quepem taluka, and falls under South Goa district, in the coastal state of Goa. It has access to the Arabian Sea via the Sal river that flows through it and shares its borders with neighbouring villages and towns of Assolna, Ambelim, Betul, and Cuncolim. The village consists of 22 hamlets or subdivisions which have been organized into 9 wards. As of 2020, the village has a total population of about 8,600 residents residing in 2,568 households. It is a part of the Velim Assembly constituency.

== Etymology ==
The word "Velim" derives from two words, "Vell" which translates to "shore" and "halli" which means "village", put together to form Velim, also known as village with a seashore.

== History ==
=== Early history ===
Historian George M. Moraes wrote about the Velliapura (present-day Velim) family, in his book "Kadamba Kula, A History of Ancient and Mediaeval Karnataka". Jayakesi, the son of Shashtha-Deva, was a very powerful ruler mentioned in a stone inscription of Kadamba King Jayakesi I, dated 1054 CE as Panajnakhani (present-day Panaji), giving him the epithet of Padavalendra which is Kannada for lord of the western ocean.

Twelfth century copper carvings reveal that princes and lords from neighbouring kingdoms traveled to Chandrapura (present-day Chandor), to pay homage to Kadamba Jayakesi, who was the sovereign of Konkan. "Velliapura Viragal " at 'Xavierian Research Centre tell that Jayakesi himself was in a battle with his rival to retain this place Velliapura won a decisive victory, which was his southern capital.

According to their resource after the 1266/1345, 16 October massacre the surviving Queen, Vinomaih devi, moved away from the furious Mohammedans in Chandrapura, and was taken into hiding in the Velliapura royal compound by the foothills of Velim. The inscription stones in Kannada found at Velim site tell that Suriya-Deva 1345CE slain-ed sovereign of Chandrapura, his Queen Vinomaih-devi died and was cremated in Velliapura by her nephew Jayeshi, son of ShankaraDeva, grandson of Purandara Deva.

=== Portuguese period ===
The Catholic missionary St. Francis Xavier is documented to have made landfall at the Port of Cabo de Rama at some point during the 16th century. From this coastal entry point, Xavier is believed to have traveled the approximately 14 km (8.7 mi) distance to the inland village of Velim, likely using pedestrian means of transportation common to the era. During his time in Velim, the historical record indicates that Xavier engaged in efforts to convert local residents to the Catholic faith. However, the blacksmith community in Velim was unreceptive to Xavier's evangelical activities and ultimately compelled him to depart the village. As a result of this episode, St. Francis Xavier has since been designated and venerated as the patron saint of Velim.

== Geography ==
Velim is located at 15°9′52″N 73°58′33″E. It has an average elevation of 18 m (59 ft).

== Demographics ==
The village had a population of 5,955 residents of which 2,805 were males and 3,150 are females, making up to 1,536 families as per the 2011 census of India. The population is predominantly Roman Catholics, with a small number of Hindus and Muslims. The people of Velim often refer to themselves as Vellikar or Velimcar.

== Village subdivisions/wards ==
The village wards include, Naik-Caiero, Silvas, Ubdando, Mascarenhas/Goleaband, Cumbeabhat/Paxel, Gorcomorod/Gorka-Moroda, Caroi, Sibrete, Tollecanto, Baradi/Bapsoro, Muxer, Pocklivoll/Khoroit, Rangalim/Zuem, Carxeta, Cutbona, Zaino/Olli-Zaino/Fondop.

=== Ward I ===
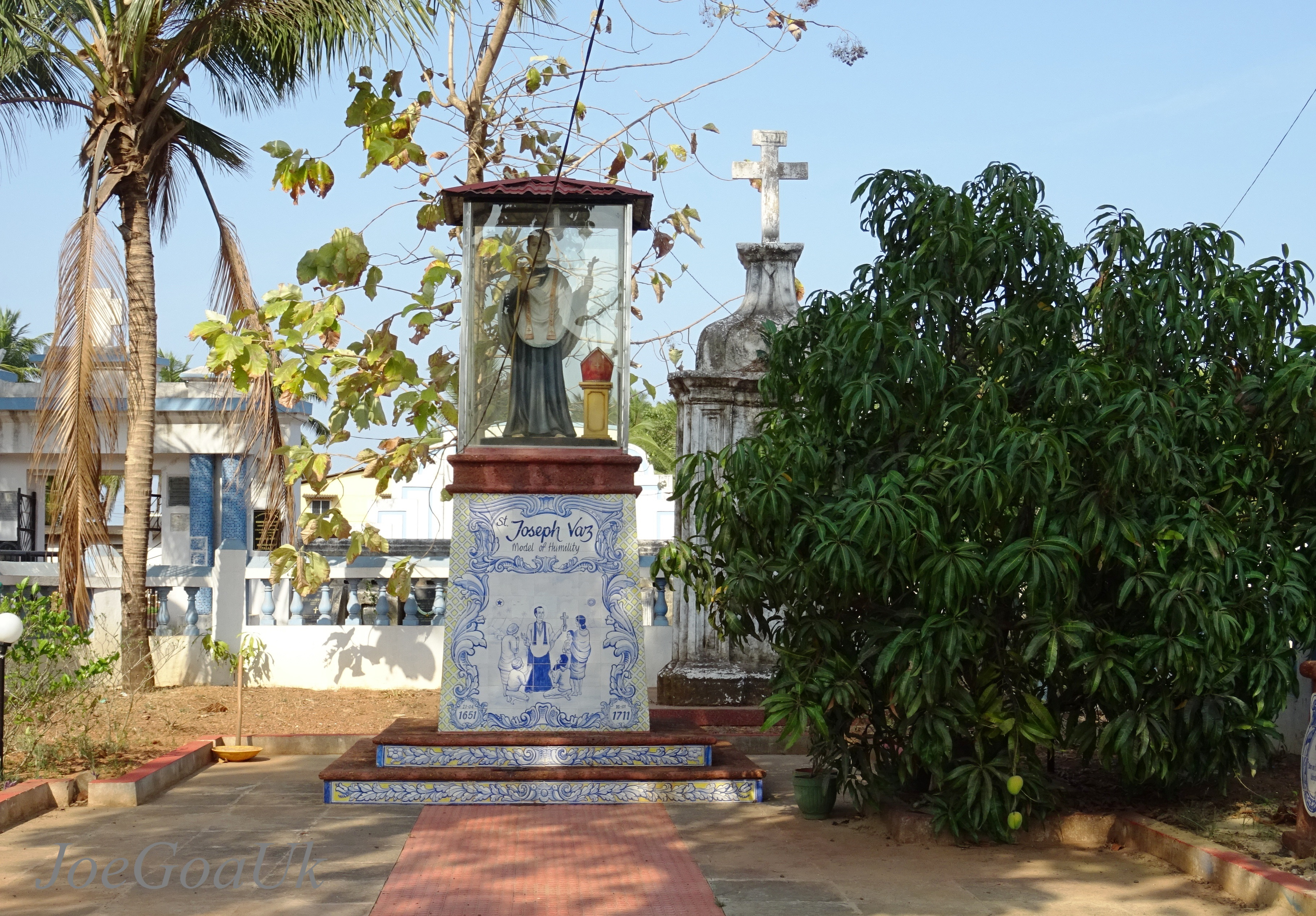
St. Joseph Vaz sculpture at Ubdando, Velim

Ward I is a well developed ward, containing the village subdivisions, Naik-Caiero, Silvas and Ubdando; it shares its borders with neighbouring subdivisions, Cumbeabhat (part), Mascarenhas/Goleaband and Cumbeabhat/Paxel. It is part of the Velim Assembly constituency and is about 15 km (9.3 mi) away from the Margao city. It has an urban appearance and is home to the Velim village panchayat. Apart from residential areas, it includes a small housing complex, general market, stores, and a fish market, on a small scale.

The manufacturing and telecommunications hallmark in the ward can also be seen in the steel cupboard fabricating factory and the BSNL tower that's located at Naik-Caiero. One of the two catholic churches of the village, the St. Francis Xavier Church is located in the vicinity of the velim panchayat. It is also close to the diocesan affiliated high school bearing the same name and caters to students from first to tenth grade. The interspersed in the architectural framework of this ward are a significant number of coconut palms.

=== Ward II ===
Ward II is a hilly area, including village subdivisions Mascarenhas/Goleaband, Cumbeabhat (part), Cumbeabhat/Paxel; the ward consists of large forest cover and paddy fields that are interspersed with a number of houses. A consequential proportion of the tribal community of the Velim village are located in this ward. Cashew, mango, and coconut are the prominent large vegetation species to be found here. The appearance of wild seasonal mushrooms is also considerable.

Domesticated animals are kept as livestock and also used as dairy farming. Some of the freshwater fish that can be found here are thigur, chikole, and valaye. A large variety of wild fauna are found here, including various types of snakes, leopards, rabbits, foxes, and monkeys, as well as birds such as bulbuls, parrots, karate, cuckoos, etc.

=== Ward III ===
Ward III has a very noteworthy proportion of the tribal community of the village, which comprises 80% of the total population in the ward. The ward includes hilly areas with forest cover, as well as cultivated agricultural fields that are interspersed with houses. The agricultural fields are used for the cultivation of paddy and vegetables. A notable number of coconut and banana plants can be spotted, and cashew is the most commonly occurring species within the forest cover. There are two freshwater springs that can be found in this ward.

The occurrence of wild mushrooms and a variety of medicinal plants are substantial. The fresh water fish includes tigur and goromb. Wild fauna like leopards, rabbits, foxes, monkeys; snakes such as cobra, python, rattle snake, russel's viper, and mandulpeshe; and birds like bulbul, parrot, karate, cuckoo, and peafowl are found here. There's also a canal that runs through this ward, which was constructed for the supply of water for irrigation purposes from the Salaulim Dam.

== Government and politics ==
Velim is part of Velim Assembly constituency and South Goa Lok Sabha constituency.

== Sports ==
The village has a playground located opposite to the St. Francis Xavier Church. It also has a sports complex, constructed by then Velim constituency MLA, Benjamin Silva, situated in Tollecanto, known as the Velim sports complex that shut its construction since 2017.

On 26 March 2022, The Director of Sports Authority of Goa, Vandana Rao assured to take appropriate actions on the ambitious project. The initiative was led by the current MLA of Velim constituency, Cruz Silva who sent letters to the SAG director and other sports officials to direct the examination of the project, further ensuring that the infrastructure is put to use for the benefit of the local youth. He also suggested a possibility of having the sports complex host the FIFA U-17 Girls World cup.

The inspection revealed that the infrastructure was ready in all aspects with only the football ground pitches that were left incomplete. The director promised to place the proposal of the sports complex as a venue to host the 2022 FIFA U-17 Women's World Cup. Fr. Allan Tavares, the priest in charge of St. Rock Church, Tollecanto, stated that the complex should also become a community centre.

== Notable residents ==
- Antonio Piedade da Cruz (1895–1982), Indian painter and sculptor
- Ben Antao, Canadian writer and journalist
- Comedian Selvy (1974–2022), Indian comedian and actor
- Sebastiao Mazarelo, Indian politician and first MLA of Cuncolim Assembly constituency and medical practitioner
- Jose Vaz, Indian politician and former headmaster of St. Xavier's High School
- Nevel Gracias (1964 – 2022), Indian playwright known for lenten tiatrs
- Roque Santana Fernandes, Indian freedom fighter and former MLA of Cuncolim Assembly constituency
- Jr. Selvy, Indian comedian and actor
- Savio Rodrigues, Indian investigative journalist and politician
- Vece Paes, Indian retired field hockey player

== See also ==
- List of constituencies of the Goa Legislative Assembly
