= Cutbona =

Neighborhood in Goa, India

Cutbona Kutbonn
- Neighborhood
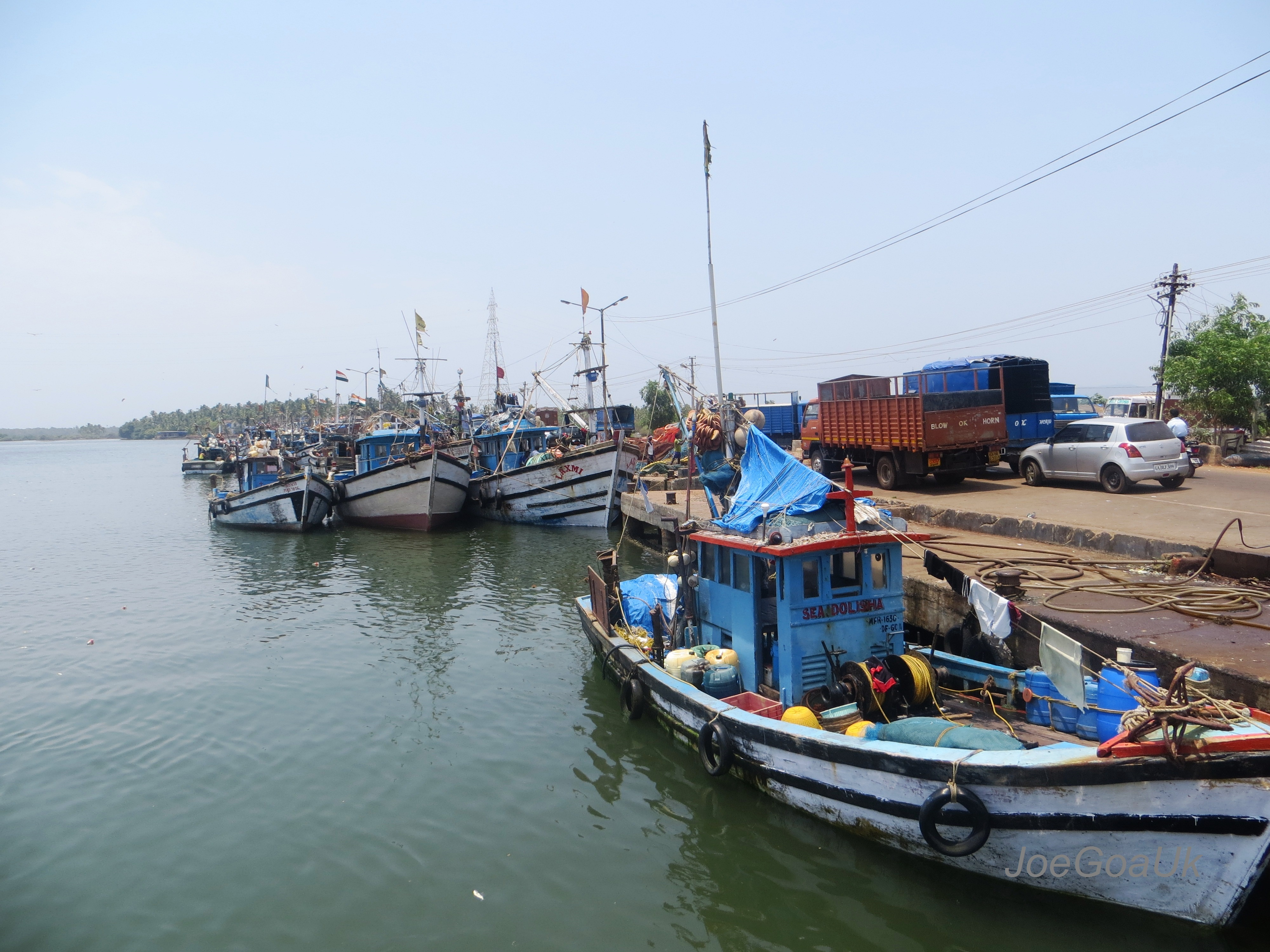
- Fishing trawlers parked in Sal river, 2013

- Location within Goa Location within India
- Coordinates: 15°9′32.5″N 73°57′14.93″E
- Country: India
- State: Goa
- District: South Goa
- Sub-district: Salcete

Government
  - Member of the Goa Legislative Assembly: Cruz Silva

Population (2022)
  - Total: 5,000
- Demonym: Migrant workers

Languages
  - Official: Konkani; English
  - Additional/Cultural: Romi Konkani; Portuguese
- Time zone: UTC+5:30 (IST)
- PIN: 403723
- Telephone code: 0832
- Vehicle registration: GA

Cutbona (Konkani: Kutbonn) is a neighborhood located within the Velim village, neighbouring Betul. It is situated in the Salcete taluka and falls under the South Goa district, in the Indian coastal state of Goa. It is about 17 km (11 mi) away from the Margao city. It is famous for its fishing jetty known as the Cutbona fishing jetty, which is South Goa's largest fishing hub, where over 300 trawlers operate. It is also a part of the Velim Assembly constituency.

== Local issues ==
Over five years from 2017, the traditional fishing communities of Cutbona and Betul faced issues of the breakwater facility at the mouth of the Sal river. Many protests were held over the delay of the construction of the facility by the Fisheries department of the state government. As of 19 September 2022, The Chief Minister of Goa, Pramod Sawant had given his assurance that the work will commence soon.
