= Ben Antao =

Canadian writer (born 1935)

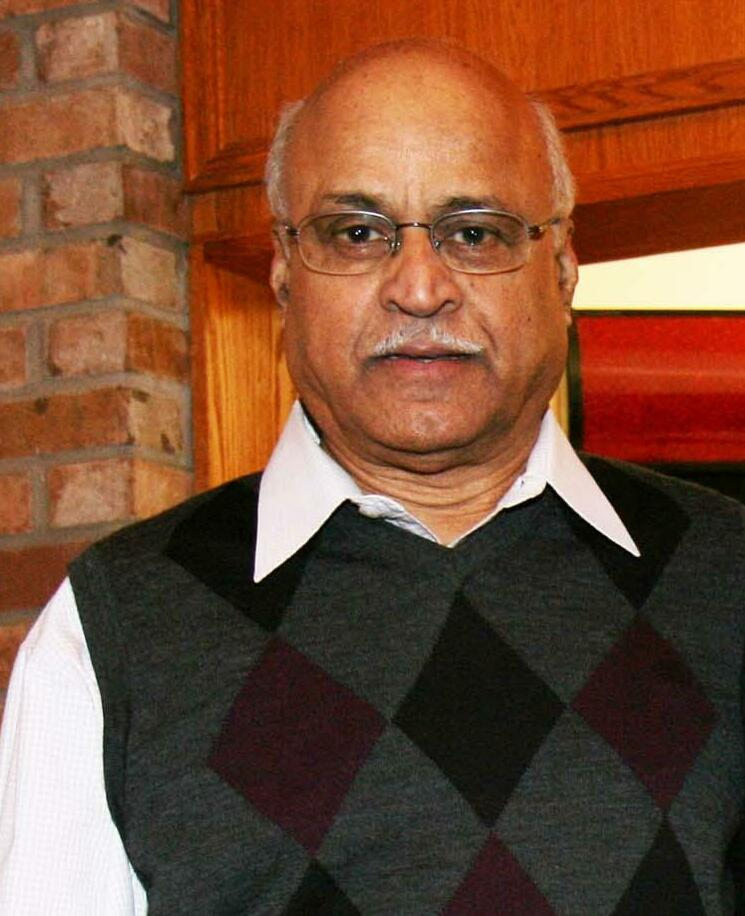
- Antao in 2010
- Born: August 12, 1935 (age 91); Velim, Goa, Portuguese India
- Education: University of Toronto (B.Ed); University of Bombay (M.A.)
- Occupations: Journalist; teacher; writer; financial planner
- Writing career
- Period: 1990–present

Ben Antao (born August 12, 1935), is a Canadian writer, journalist, former teacher, and certified financial planner. He is currently based in Toronto, Canada.

== Early life and education ==
Ben Antao was born in Velim, Goa, Portuguese India during the Portuguese Empire (now in India). He graduated from the University of Bombay (M.A. in English).

== Career ==
=== Journalism (1963–1967) ===
Antao first worked as a reporter for The Navhind Times in Panjim, Goa (1963–64) and later joined The Indian Express (1965–66) in Bombay as a reporter. In 1966, he was awarded a journalism fellowship by the World Press Institute based at Macalester College, Saint Paul, Minnesota, for a year of study and travel in the United States. While in the US, he worked for ten weeks as a writer and editor for The Denver Post, CO. After immigrating to Canada in 1967, he worked for The Catholic Register weekly and The Globe and Mail, both of Toronto.

=== Teaching (1976–1998) ===
In 1976, he graduated from the University of Toronto (B.Ed) and switched to a teaching career. He retired from teaching English in high school in 1998.

=== Writing (1990–present) ===
In 1990, he published Images of Goa, a memoir of his early life and experiences in his native land. In 2004, he published Goa, A Rediscovery, a travelogue of his visit to Goa. He has written five novels, over two dozen short stories, a play and a movie script based on his novel The Tailor's Daughter. His other novels are Blood & Nemesis, Penance, Living on the Market, The Priest and His Karma, and Money and Politics. His non-fiction includes two memoirs: Images of Goa (2011, 2ed) and Images of the USA (2009), and two travelogues: Goa, A Rediscovery (2004) and The Lands of Sicily (2008).

Antao is a former president of the Canadian Authors Association (Toronto branch).
