= Colaco =

Colaco or Colaço is a Portuguese surname. Notable people with the surname include:

- Armando Colaco (born 1953), Indian football manager
- Bruno Colaço (born 1991), Indian footballer
- Edwin Colaço (1937–2025), Indian Roman Catholic prelate and bishop
- Jorge Colaço (1868–1942), Portuguese painter
- Joseph Colaco, Indian structural engineer
- Liston Colaco (born 1998), Indian footballer
- Maria Rosa Colaço (1935–2004), Portuguese children's writer and journalist
- Nicolau Colaco (born 1984), Indian footballer
- Nicole Colaco (born 1970), Canadian field hockey player
