= Tollecanto =

Neighborhood in Goa, India

- Neighborhood
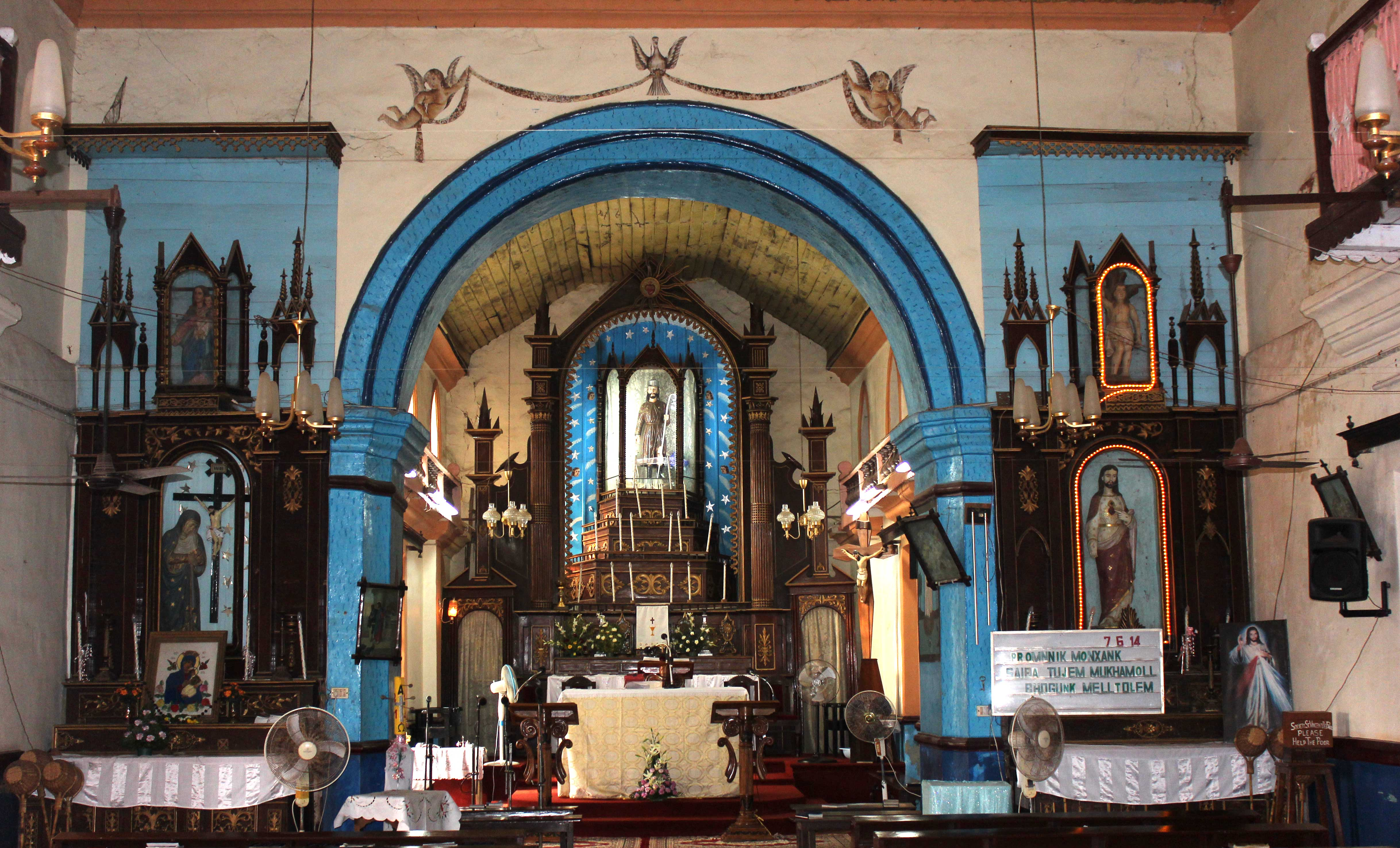
- Interior of St. Rock's Church, Tollecanto

- Location within Goa Location within India
- Coordinates: 15°9′27.99″N 73°57′54.12″E
- Country: India
- State: Goa
- District: South Goa
- Sub-district: Salcete

Government
  - Member of the Goa Legislative Assembly: Cruz Silva

Population
  - Total: 3,200
- Demonym: Catholics

Languages
  - Official: Konkani; English
  - Additional/Cultural: Romi Konkani; Portuguese
- Time zone: UTC+5:30 (IST)
- PIN: 403723
- Telephone code: 0832
- Vehicle registration: GA

Tollecanto is a neighborhood located within the village of Velim, situated in the Salcete taluka and falls under the South Goa district, in the Indian coastal state of Goa. It is about 17 km (11 mi) away from the Margao city and is also a part of the Velim Assembly constituency.

== St. Rock Church ==
=== Incident in 2020 ===
In October 2020, the frontal facade of the church collapsed due to water seepage. It was originally built as a chapel in the Portuguese era around the 19th century, believed to be around 139 years old and was elevated to a church nearly 67 years ago.

Fr. Allan Travasso, the priest incharge, stated that the church was underway a renovation which was applied for permission to the Town and Country Planning Department and also with the panchayat for the construction of the new facade. He also further stated that it was because of the water seepage, the walls turned weak due to the moisture. The permissions were then delayed due to the COVID-19 pandemic, taking note of this matter, the religious services had to be halted until the church was restored.

=== About ===
The St. Rock Church, Tollecanto, Goa,(Portuguese: Sao Roque Igreja em Tollecanto, Goa), popularly known as the Tollecanto Church was originally built as a chapel in 1883. It was associated to the Velim Parish Church and later detached into a separate parish in 1955. Currently the religious order present within the St. Rock parish are The Good Shepherd Sisters (RGS) which are based at Good Shepherd Convent in Carxeta, Velim. They also run a social service centre known as The Good Shepherd Social Service Centre.

== Education ==
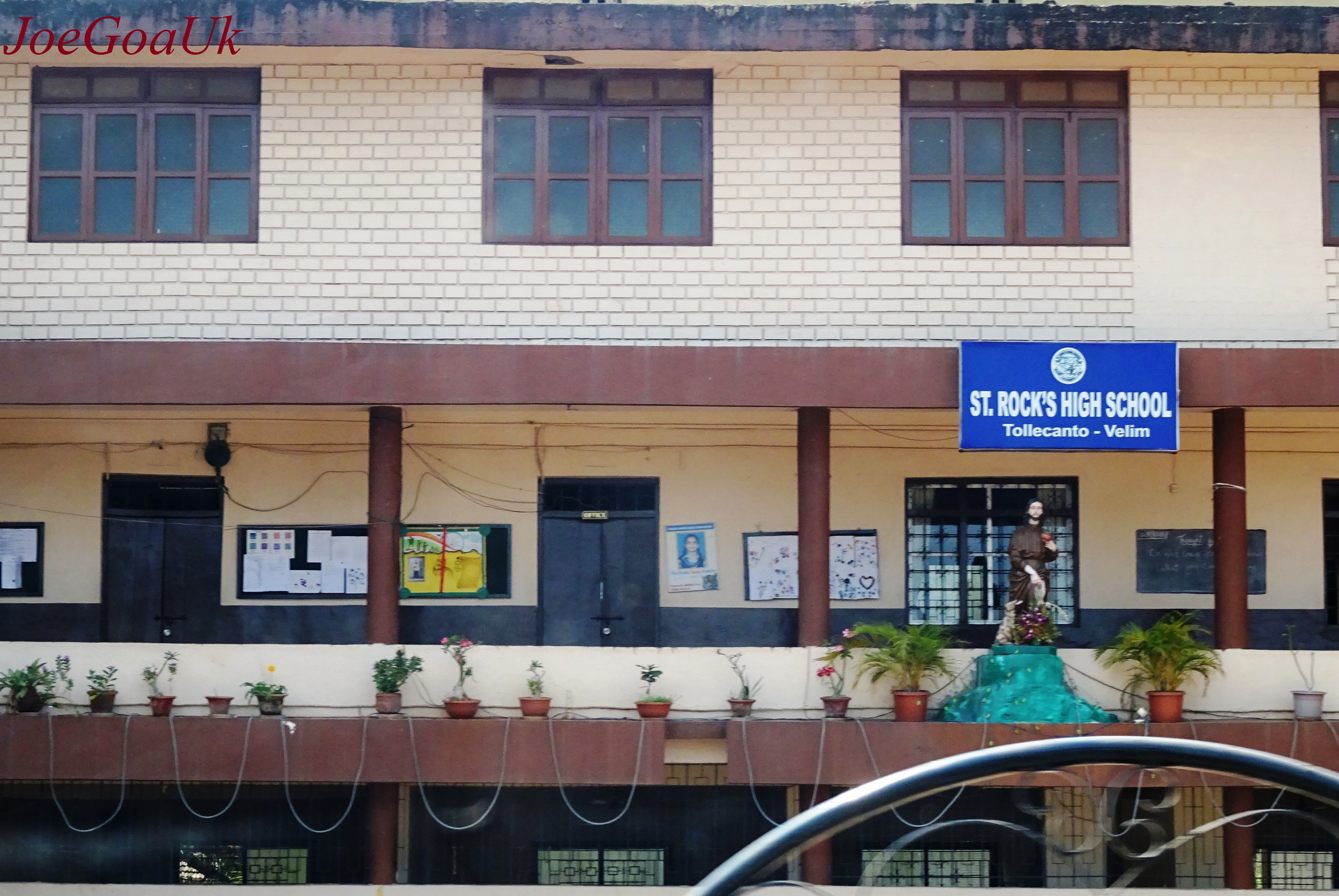
St. Rock's High School, Tollecanto

The two educational institutions that are located within the Tollecanto parish are, St. Rock's High School and The Good Shepherd Kid’s Play School which is run by Good Shepherd Sisters.

== See also ==
- List of parishes of the Roman Catholic Archdiocese of Goa and Daman
