= Betul, Goa =

Betul
- Village
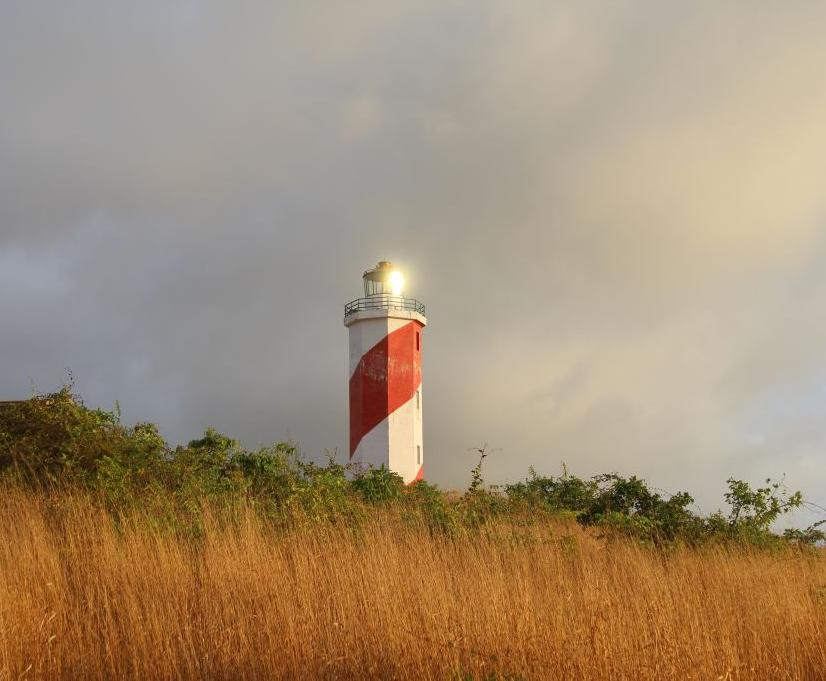
- Betul Lighthouse in 2015
- Interactive map of Betul
- Coordinates: 15.144837°N 73.958244°E
- Country: India
- State: Goa
- District: South Goa
- Sub-district: Quepem
- Elevation: 10 m (33 ft)

Languages
  - Official: Konkani
- Time zone: UTC+5:30 (IST)
- Vehicle registration: GA-08
- Website: goa.gov.in

Betul is a coastal village located in the Quepem taluka, South Goa district, Goa, India. It is the southernmost village of Quepem and is well-known for its beach, lighthouse, and fort. It is lies about an hour south from Margao. The Sal river drains into the Arabian sea near Betul.

As of November 2025, the Betul village panchayat opposed the construction of a satellite port at Betul, proposed by the Mormugao Port Authority. Opponents say that the port would threaten local fish breeding and the livelihood of local fishing communities.
