= Jackniband =

Settlement in Goa, India

Jackniband Jakni Bandh
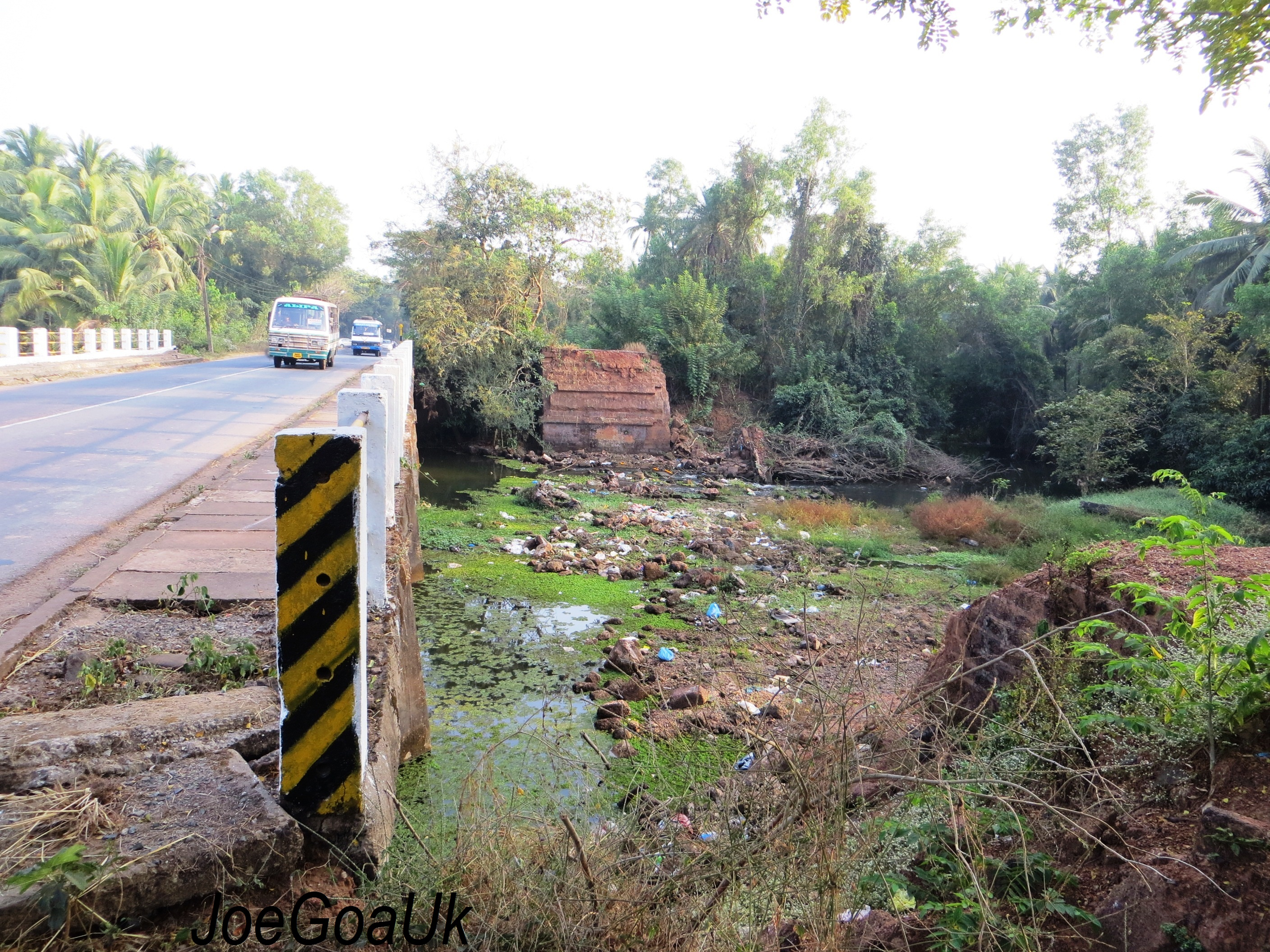
- The Jakni Bandh bridge, 2014

- Location within Goa Location within India
- Coordinates: 15°14′27.63″N 73°58′31.94″E

Jackniband (alternatively spelt as Jakni Bandh or Jaknibandh) is a settlement that lies between the village of Dramapur and the census town of Navelim.

== Pollution ==
In February 2014, the Sirlim-Dramapur panchayat expressed their apprehension to the deputy collector regarding the contamination of the Sal River caused by metal waste from scrapyards located at Jackniband. They requested appropriate measures to address the issue. A member of the panchayat, Dominic Noronha, later revealed that the deputy collector had acknowledged the concern and instructed the Salcete mamlatdar to take necessary action. However, no action had been taken to resolve the matter.

In April 2015, an investigation was carried out on water samples obtained from Jackniband. The analysis revealed elevated concentrations of fecal coliform, with readings reaching as high as 13,000 MPN (most probable number) per 100 ml, and a total coliform count of 54,000 MPN per 100 ml. Additionally, traces of oil, grease, and suspended solids were detected in the water samples.

The river-dependent local population had reported instances of skin rashes upon contact with the river water, unaware of its polluted state. Subsequent investigations later revealed a situation whereby numerous households situated along the riverbanks had been discharging untreated sewage directly into the river. Furthermore, the practice of open defecation by migrants along the riverbanks had compounded the pollution issue.

The Goa State Pollution Control Board (GSPCB) conducted an investigation prompted by complaints from the Dramapur-Sirlim village panchayat regarding potential water pollution originating from two scrapyards operating near the river. As part of their inquiry, the GSPCB collected water samples in order to assess the situation and gather objective evidence.

== Scrapyards issue ==
In March 2015, an endeavor by the Dramapur-Sirlim panchayat to eradicate two scrap yards situated along the banks of the River Sal at Jackniband encountered an obstacle. The final notice issued by the panchayat to dismantle the scrap yard was nullified and disregarded by the Additional Director of Panchayats, Gopal A Parsekar. The basis for this decision was the assertion that a village Sarpanch lacks the jurisdiction to issue a conclusive demolition notice. Citing a precedent from the High Court, which held that a Sarpanch does not possess the authority to issue such a notice, the matter was referred back to the village panchayat.

Undeterred by this setback, the Dramapur Secretary issued fresh directives to the owners of the two scrap yards, instructing them to remove the unauthorized scrap and restore the land to its original condition within a seven-day timeframe. Panchayat Secretary Sanjeev Naik cautioned that if the owners failed to comply with the instructions, the panchayat would undertake further necessary measures to eliminate the illicit scrap yards. Sarpanch Domnick Noronha expressed to the panchayat to have the two scrap yards eradicated from the banks of the River Sal. He also raised inquiries regarding the failure of the Mamlatdar authorities to provide commentary on the legal status of the scrap yards in the inquiry report submitted to the Sub-divisional magistrate in Margao.

== Accident-proneness ==
On 16 October 2015, an inspection was conducted on a road section between Jackniband Junction and Navelim junction, which had a history of frequent accidents. The inspection team consisted of officials including the Collector, Public Works Department (PWD), DySP traffic, Navelim MLA Avertano Furtado, and panchayat representatives. Spanning approximately 1.2 kilometres (0.75 mi), the total cost of the necessary works, including land acquisition, was estimated at ₹20.5 crore (equivalent to ₹31 crore or US$3.2 million in 2023). The local community and residents had expressed their concerns and demanded repairs to mitigate the high accident rate on this road segment.

== 2014 burglary rise ==
In July 2014, Schubert Furtado, sibling of Navelim MLA Avertano Furtado, put forth a proposal to the district magistrate and local law enforcement authorities. The proposal entailed a strategic enhancement of patrols at the Mandopa and Jackniband junctions, aimed at vigilantly monitoring the movements of individuals involved in illicit activities. This proactive measure was prompted by a surge in burglaries within the Salcete region, with the primary objective of preemptively deterring and apprehending burglars and robbers.

== Proposed works ==
In February 2014, Agustinho D'Costa, serving as the sarpanch of the Sirlim-Dramapur panchayat, made public statements regarding proposed initiatives aimed at enhancing the visual appeal of the river bank situated at Jackniband. The plans involved the potential construction of a pedestrian walkway along the existing bridge and the installation of a water tank in the vicinity.

=== 2013–2014 bypass road ===
In January 2013, Avertano Furtado, the elected representative for Navelim in the Goa Legislative Assembly, presented a formal proposition for the construction of a bypass road. The proposed road aimed to establish a connection between the pre-existing eastern bypass located at Rawanfond and Jackniband situated at Dramapur. The primary objective of implementing this bypass road was to mitigate the prevalent issue of traffic congestion within the village of Navelim. More specifically, the existing traffic flow from the Eastern bypass, which entered Navelim near the Church, had been a major contributing factor to the significant traffic problems experienced in the area.

In February 2014, Manohar Parrikar, the Chief Minister of Goa, announced his proposal for a road bypass that would connect the Eastern bypass at Rawanfond to the NH-17 at Jackniband. Parrikar expressed his intention to initiate the project promptly by initiating the land acquisition process through government channels.

In October 2014, an article published by Guilherme Almeida in O Heraldo drew attention to the fact that the proposed solution to address the issue of land acquisition had not resulted in any tangible changes to the current situation. As the process of acquiring land proved to be time-consuming, local Members of the Legislative Assembly (MLAs) had put forth an alternative plan. This plan involved widening the existing highway between Navelim Church and Jakni Bandh bridge, with the exception of two houses whose owners had not granted their consent for the widening project.

Furtado had devised both short-term and long-term measures to alleviate the traffic problems faced by Navelim. One of the long-term measures entails the construction of a bypass road connecting Jackniband to Rawanfond. However, the implementation of this measure is subject to the acquisition of land, which is a complex process that requires additional time. In the meantime, as a temporary solution to mitigate traffic congestion, particularly near the church junction, Furtado had proposed widening the existing road between Jackniband and Navelim Church. Additionally, the installation of a traffic circle at the junction had been considered to regulate the flow of traffic following the road widening.

=== 2015–2016 road widening ===
On 18 January 2015, the Navelim Civic and Consumer Forum (NCCF) convened its monthly general meeting of consumers at Rosary High School in Navelim. One of the key topics discussed during the meeting was the proposed expansion of the road connecting Navelim and Jackniband.

In November 2015, Avertano Furtado, the elected representative of the Navelim constituency, announced a plan that aimed to enhance the road connecting Navelim junction to Jackniband by widening its span and implementing LED lighting throughout the entire stretch. The proposed expansion involved increasing the width of the 1.5 kilometres (0.93 mi) road segment by 3 meters on both sides and incorporating a divider. The estimated cost of this undertaking was approximately ₹25 crore (equivalent to ₹38 crore or US$3.9 million in 2023), with ₹17 crore (equivalent to ₹26 crore or US$2.7 million in 2023) assigned for land acquisition and ₹5 crore (equivalent to ₹7.5 crore or US$780,000 in 2023) designated for the construction of footpaths and gutters.

In May 2016, Winston, an NRI and senior citizen, expressed his discontent with the local authorities responsible for the widening of the NH17 Navelim-Jackniband road. He took action by writing a letter to the President Pranab Mukherjee and Prime Minister of India, Narendra Modi, outlining his objections to the project's implementation. Winston alleged that the widening work conducted on NH-17 deviated from the guidelines set forth in the Land Acquisition, Rehabilitation, and Resettlement (LARR) Act of 2013.

According to Winston, the project commenced without adhering to the provisions of the LARR Act, which require the acquisition of land before undertaking any construction activities. He raised concerns about the lack of land acquisition and compensation practices, noting that the prevailing compensation rate of ₹2,822 (equivalent to ₹4,100 or US$42 in 2023) per square meter was significantly lower than the market rate of ₹20,000 (equivalent to ₹29,000 or US$300 in 2023) per square meter in the area.

=== 2015 4G mobile tower ===
In September 2015, an incident occurred in Dramapur-Sirlim when three panchas lodged official complaints with the relevant authorities, including the local police, regarding the installation of a mobile tower adjacent to Jackniband bus stop along the National Highway. The primary concern raised by the complainants, namely Dominic Noronha, Bernand Rebello, and Netty Ferrao, was the absence of necessary approvals from the local panchayat for the tower's installation. The purpose of erecting this tower was to facilitate the provision of 4G broadband services.

The complainants alleged that the Chief Engineer of the Public Works Department (PWD) had granted permission for the mobile tower's installation under the condition that the responsible company would organize an awareness campaign to educate the public about the potential impacts of the tower. However, they claimed that no such campaign had been conducted. Additionally, they asserted that the tower had been erected clandestinely during nighttime in order to avoid potential opposition from the local villagers.

As a result of these concerns, the complainants called for a thorough investigation into the tower's compliance with relevant legal regulations. It is worth noting that Noronha clarified his position, stating that his objection was not against technological advancements per se, but rather focused on the location of the tower within the setback area of the national highway.
