= Jakni Bandh bridge =

Bridge in Goa, India

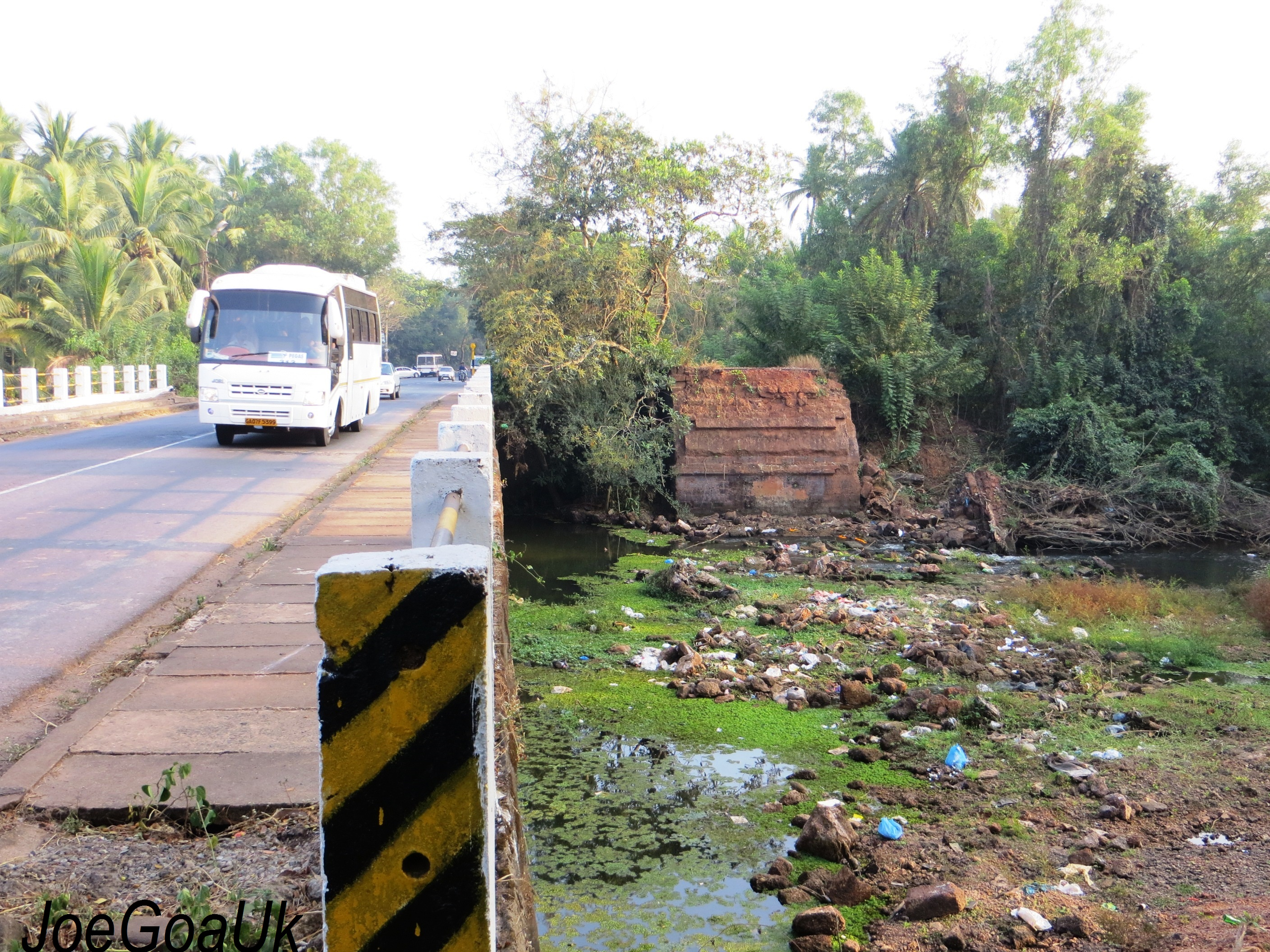
- The Jakni Bandh bridge, 2014
- Coordinates: 15°14′29.61″N 73°58′29.61″E
- Crosses: Sal River
- Locale: Jackniband, Goa, India
- Maintained by: Goa State Infrastructure Development Corporation Limited

Characteristics
- Design: Arch bridge

History
- Opened: Prior to 1979

Location
- Interactive map of Jakni Bandh bridge

The Jakni Bandh bridge is a temporary bridge or culvert connecting the village of Dramapur and the census town of Navelim.

== 1979 school bus incident ==
In 1979, an incident took place involving a school bus that lost control and plunged from the temporary bridge, leading to the deaths of all occupants. The majority of the victims were schoolchildren, some of whom were of tender age. This occurrence subsequently gave rise to a local legend associated with Jakni Bandh, which suggests that after sunset, one may allegedly perceive haunting auditory phenomena resembling the anguished cries and lamentations of the deceased children.

Sunil M1 of Vijaya Karnataka writes, the school concluded at approximately 1 pm, prompting a considerable number of students to gather in the vicinity of the Margao bus stand. While many students congregated there, a subset of individuals opted to utilize mini-buses as an alternative mode of transportation due to the sluggish pace of the private buses operating along the same route. As the mini-bus drivers were known for their swift driving, the vehicles swiftly reached maximum capacity. It is worth noting that this accelerated pace has been associated with multiple accidents in the area. Despite being cognizant of this fact, passengers, including both young children and adults, continued to choose mini-buses for their expedient travel.

While traversing the Janki Bandh bridge, the mini-bus lost control and descended beneath the structure. The local residents responded to the scene, to rescue those involved. Some individuals managed to evacuate children to higher ground. However, according to eyewitness testimonies, no survivors emerged from the incident. The accident's cause has been attributed to driver negligence. The community expressed grief over the loss of lives, and this event remains a subject of discussion when accidents occur in the area.

== Ghostlore ==
Following the incident, reports of paranormal activity emerged, leading to accounts of ghostly encounters among visitors to the location. Witnesses have described witnessing apparitions resembling children running in the area. According to local residents, these eerie sounds are only audible on specific days throughout the year. Some individuals assert that the ghostly presence extends beyond children, suggesting the existence of a wandering female spirit in the vicinity. It is worth noting that the road, previously characterized by its narrowness, has undergone significant development.

== Analysis ==
Sunil M1 from Vijaya Karnataka, acknowledges the uncertainty surrounding the existence of ghosts. This topic remains open for debate and is largely influenced by personal beliefs. The primary objective of their article is not to instill fear or promote the notion of ghosts. Instead, they aim to document and examine local beliefs and customs. It is common for accidents to occur during nighttime travel, and certain locations where accidents have transpired may give rise to stories and legends involving ghosts. Janki Bandh, in particular, has witnessed numerous accidents, and the subsequent dissemination of these incidents may have contributed to the development of a belief in ghosts. Regarding the presence of child spirits in the area, it remains an unanswered question, fueling ongoing discussions and curiosity.

== In popular culture ==
In November 2023, Jakni Bandh was featured in the book, "Enigmas Revealed: Decoding The Secrets Of Mystery, Myths And Superstitions" by Chaitanya S Agarwal.

== See also ==
- List of reportedly haunted locations in India
