= Alvaro de Loyola Furtado =

Indian politician and medical practitioner (1914–1981)

Captain Alvaro de Loyola Furtado BS WM

Member of Goa, Daman and Diu Legislative Assembly
- In office 1963–1967
- Preceded by: constituency established
- Succeeded by: Leo Velho Mauricio
- Constituency: Navelim

Personal details
- Born: 23 May 1914 Chinchinim, Goa, Portuguese India
- Died: 23 August 1981 (aged 67) Goa, India
- Relatives: Mario de Loyola Furtado (brother); José Inácio Candido de Loyola (uncle)
- Education: Rachol Seminary; St. Aloysius College; Madras Medical College (1941)
- Occupation: Politician; social worker; historian; journalist; medical practitioner
- Nickname: Dr. Alu

Military service
- Allegiance: British India
- Branch/service: British Indian Army
- Rank: Captain
- Unit: Indian Medical Services
- Commands: South East Asia Command
- Battles/wars: World War II

Captain Alvaro de Loyola Furtado BS WM OM (23 May 1914 – 23 August 1981) was an Indian politician and medical practitioner who was a former member of the Goa, Daman and Diu Legislative Assembly and one of the founding members of the United Goans Party. He was also a social worker, historian, journalist, medical practitioner and humanitarian. Described as a leader among men, a man of great integrity and honour.

== Early life and education ==
Alvaro de Loyola Furtado was born in the village of Chinchinim in Portuguese Goa. He was born into one of the prominent families of Goa, the Loyolas of Orlim. His maternal uncle, José Inácio de Loyola was a fierce patriot, much before the mainstream Goa freedom struggle and the founder of Partido Indiano.

His father, Dr. Miguel de Loyola Furtado, was an eminent doctor. Furtado was also an activist who edited the A India Portuguesa. His elder brother, Mario de Loyola Furtado, published Goa's oldest publication, the A India Portuguesa, and was a prominent Goan lawyer in the Portuguese era.

After completing his primary schooling, Furtado admitted in Rachol Seminary. He moved to Bangalore for further studies and then passed Inter-Science with distinction from St. Aloysius College. He obtained his medical degree from Madras Medical College in 1941.

== Military career ==
Furtado served in the Indian Medical Service under the South East Asia Command during World War II. He was a Captain for four years in Nira and Chittagong, Bengal. He was awarded the Burma campaign medal, Long Service Medal and War Medal for his meritorious service.

== Post-military ==
After World War II, Furtado returned to his native village and started his medical practice. He served the poor and the rich without distinction, often waking up at unearthly hours. He was actively involved in the Tuberculosis Control Programme and was awarded the title, "Chief of 'Ordem dos Médicos da Índia Portuguesa". Furtado was concerned about the decline of the Comunidades and in 1961 he wrote a paper advocating its continuance. As a member of the Goa legislature he moved various resolutions that covered Goan rural life.

== Literary career ==
At the Instituto Vasco da Gama, he wrote articles that led the Governor General Vassalo e Silva to reinstate to the comunidades full ownership rights and abolish rents (foro). Later, he resigned from the Instituto in protest against the Governor's interference in cultural institutions. The Portuguese administration had marked him as a member of the Margao Group of Autonomists and anti-Salazarists.

== Personal life ==
Loyola Furtado spoke fluent English, Portuguese, Konkani and Latin. He wrote various papers, mostly in Portuguese. Os Primordios de Inprensa e do Jornalismo em Goa e no Resto da índia was an essay on the history of printing and journalism in India. O Diréito de Propriedade Rústica nas Comunidades Aldeanas was a treatise on the Communidades (Ganvkaar) system in Goa and an advocacy of its continuance.

== Role in Goa's liberation movement ==
Furtado was a patriot for Goa. He advocated autonomy for the Portuguese colonies in India. When India's independence was declared, the movement for Goa's freedom gained momentum. In July 1946, he took part in a public meeting that openly petitioned the Salazar administration to grant autonomy to the Estado da India. The meeting was presided by his grandfather, José Inácio de Loyola. Laxmikant Bhembre proposed a committee to pursue autonomy. Loyola Furtado was one of the members of this committee. However their efforts did not move Salazar.

== Political career ==
=== Mayor of Salsette ===
During Portuguese rule, Furtado was the mayor of Salcete Municipality for two years where he worked pro-bono. He resigned as he felt that the Portuguese administration hurt nationalist feelings.

=== Entry into legislative assembly ===
Furtado was a founding member of the United Goans Party headed by Jack de Sequeira. He successfully brought about the merger of four political parties that formed the UGP. He was also a member of the "Congresso Provincial de Goa" and also a member of the delegation that met Prime Minister Jawaharlal Nehru, to apprise him of the aspirations of Goans, for a separate political identity.

In the first Goa, Daman and Diu Assembly elections, Loyola Furtado contested from Navelim Assembly constituency on the United Goans Party ticket and won. He led a revolt against the party president, Dr. Jack de Sequeira in 1967 on the issue of the Goa Opinion Poll and formed a splinter group that came to be known after him as United Goans Party (Furtado Group). The remaining members came to be known as United Goans Party (Sequiera Group).

The assembly had been dissolved prior to the Opinion Poll to ensure a free and fair referendum. In the following election, the Furtado Group contested in six constituencies. They lost all seats.

== Death ==
Furtado died on 23 August 1981. His funeral at Chinchinim was attended by thousands of villagers, patients, medical professionals and politicians.

== Legacy ==
In recognition of his contribution, the locals of Chinchinim have named the main road from St. Sebastian's Chapel, Chinchinim, to the Assolna bridge in his honour.

Portuguese historian Teotonio de Souza published a work "A Scholar's Discovery of Goa", Alvaro de Loyola Furtado: A Tribute from his Fellow Citizens in 1982 as a tribute to Loyola Furtado.
