= Sal River (India) =

River in India

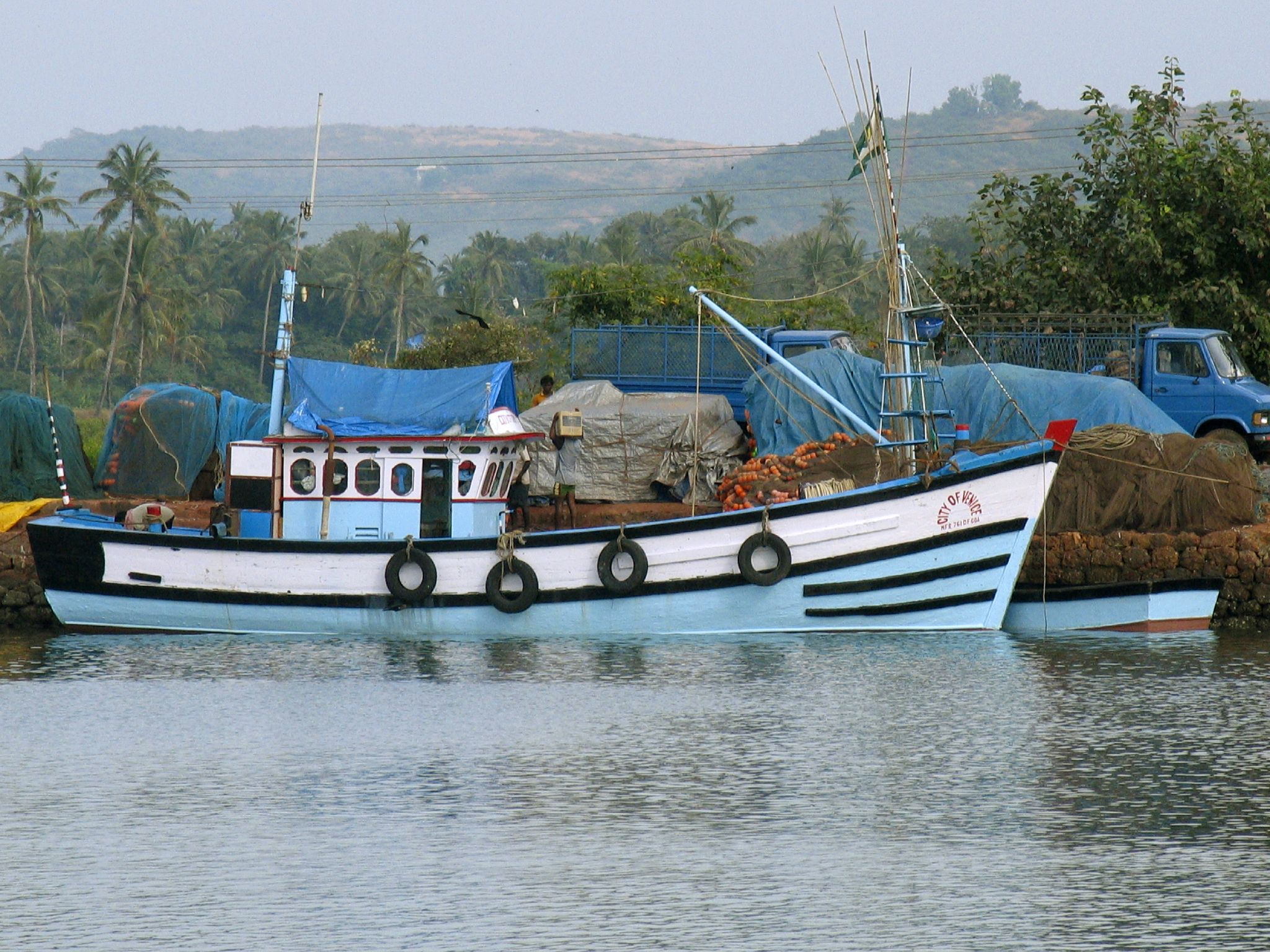
Fishing boats sailing on Sal River

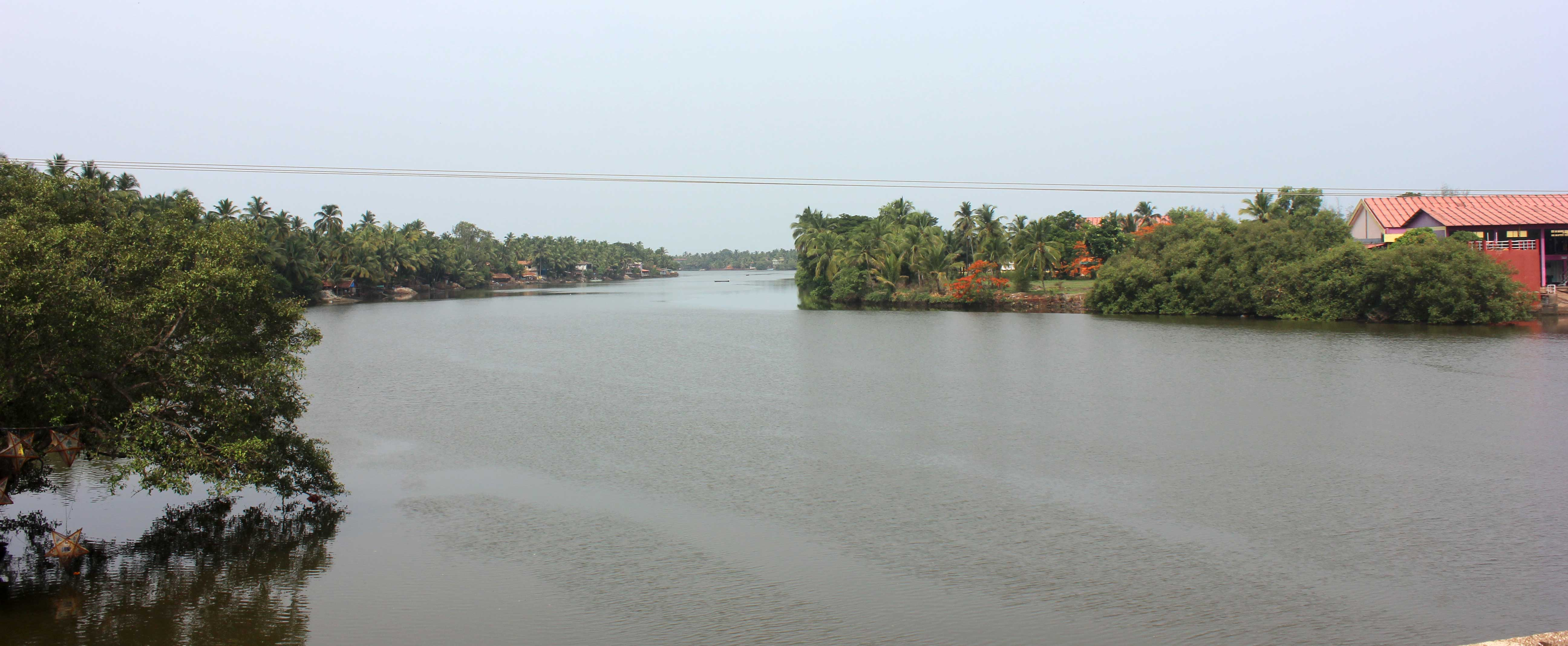
Sal river in Goa, India.

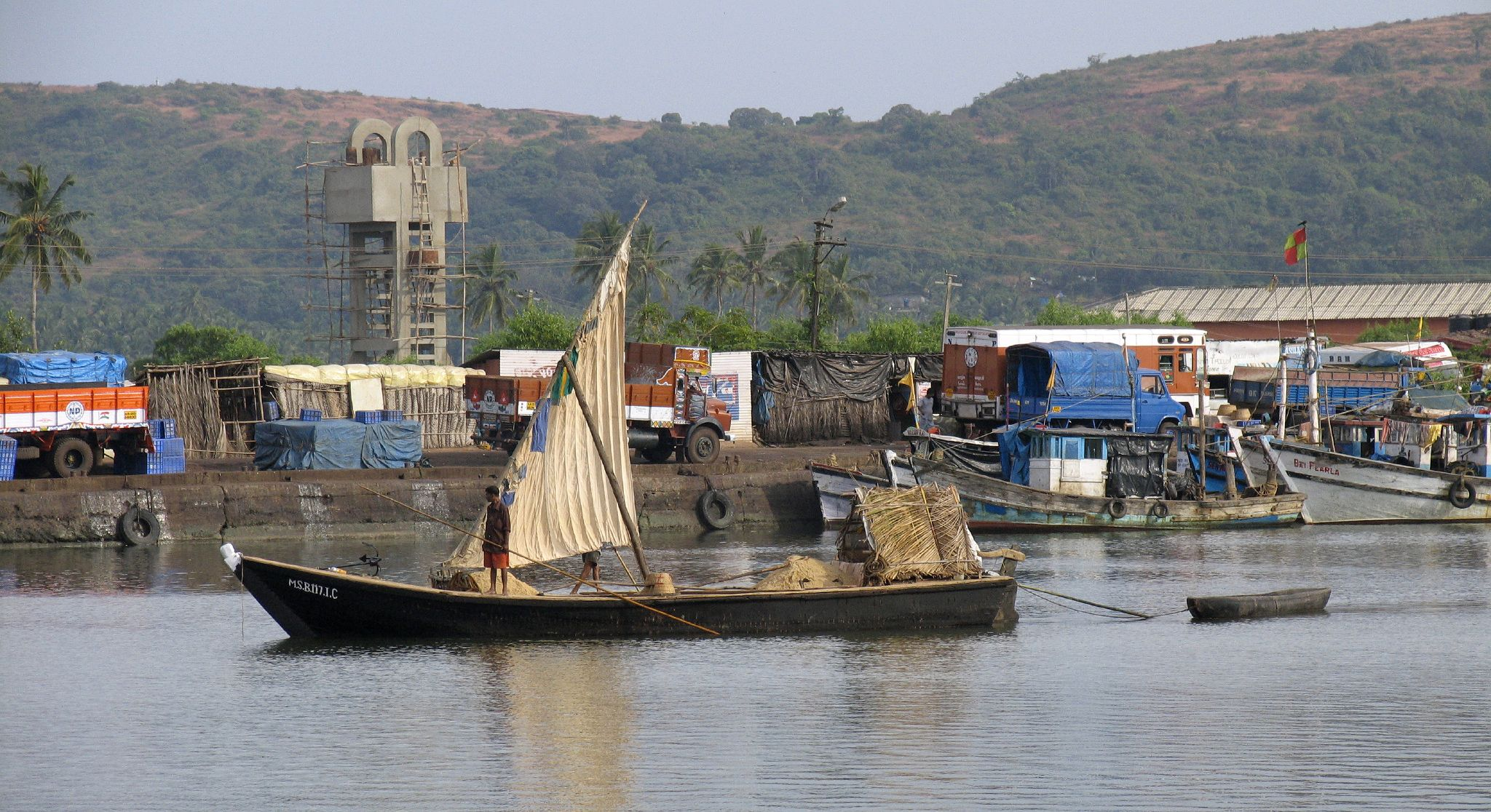
Boats at Sal river

The Sal River is a river in Salcete, in the Indian state of Goa.

== Flow ==
The river opens near Verna and flows in south-western direction for 16 kilometers passing through the villages of Nuvem, Mongul, Seraulim, Colva, Margao, Benaulim, Navelim, Varca, Orlim, Carmona, Dramapur, Chinchinim, Assolna, Cavelossim, and Mobor, and drains itself into the Arabian Sea at Betul. Sal river boating is also a tourist attraction.

== Activities ==
Fishing was common occupation of the local residents in the olden days which boosted the economy of the Goa but has declined due to the pollution of the river banks. In past few years rapid Urbanization, encroachment, deforestation and wastage dumping led to severe pollution and loss of marine ecology. Local residents of Benaulim have been complaining to the Government since 2008 about pollution and the dumping of garbage into the river and residents of Carmona have raised a Greenpeace petition to stop a "mega-housing project" which it is feared will add to the pollution. On 4 February 2018, the Central Government of India sanctioned a project worth Rs. 61.74 crore for controlling the pollution on the river Sal.
