= Sarzora =

- village
- Location in Goa, India Sarzora (India)
- Coordinates: 15°13′11″N 73°59′40″E
- Country: India
- State: Goa
- District: South Goa

Population (2001)
  - Total: 1,911

Languages
  - Official: Konkani
- Time zone: UTC+5:30 (IST)
- PIN: 403 715
- Telephone code: 0832
- Vehicle registration: GA 02, GA 08
- Sex ratio: 0.80 ♂/♀
- Website: goa.gov.in

Sarzora is a village in the Salcete taluka (or sub-district) in the South Goa District of the Indian state of Goa. It is known for its village lake, sylvan settings, and is surrounded by hillocks.

== Population ==
Sarzora Lake

Its population was 1,911 in 488 households. As of 2001

== Lake ==
A village nestled amidst hillocks, it is known for its natural freshwater and rain-fed lake, which has been described as green and peaceful, and particularly suited for evening visits.

== Location, vicinity ==
Sarzora is in the vicinity of Chinchinim, Deussa, Dramapur and other villages or hamlets of Salcete. Of late, as in other parts of Goa, Sarzora too has become a venue for real estate deals.

== Institutions ==
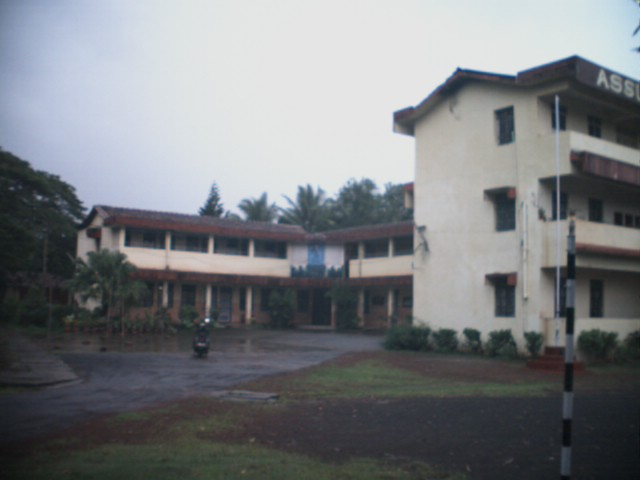
Assumpta Convent.

The village church is dedicated to Our Lady of the Assumption, and was set up in 1973. The village is home to the Assumpta Convent and High School, which is run by the FSMA Catholic nuns. This congregation of the Franciscan Sisters Of St. Mary Of The Angels was founded in 1871 in France.

== Distance, constituencies ==
Sarzora is located about 12 km away from the district headquarters town of Margao. As of 2019, it is part of the Velim assembly constituency and the South Goa parliamentary constituency. It lies near the highway that connects Margao with Canacona and Karwar in the south.

== Gallery ==
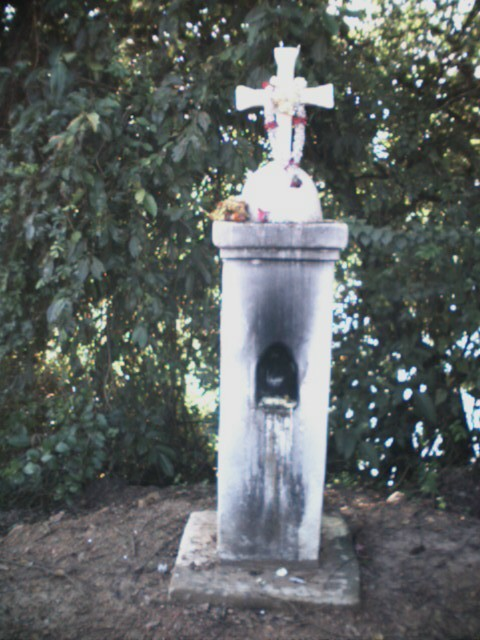
The cross next to the culvert at Olliazote

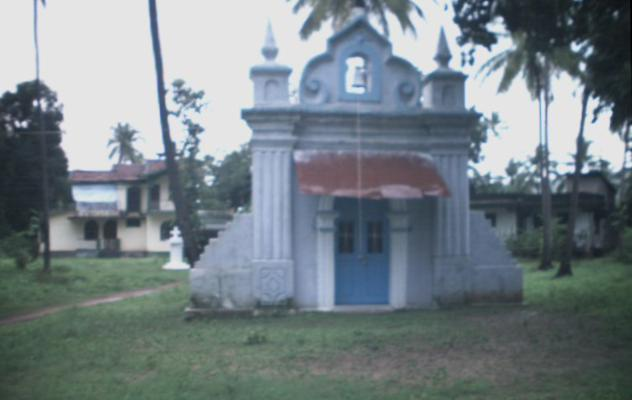
The St. Sebastian Chapel at Olliazote

Chapel of Our Lady of Fatima

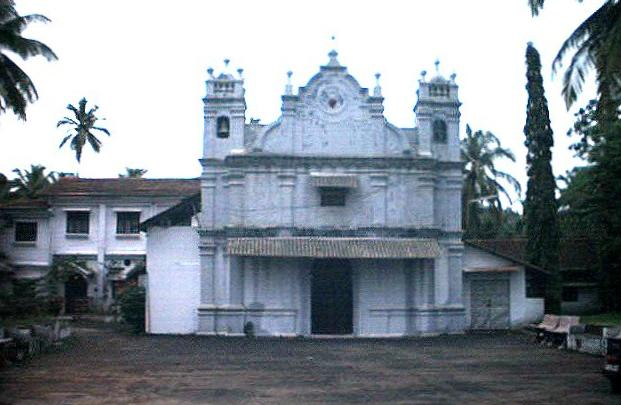
Our Lady Of Assumption Church Sarzora

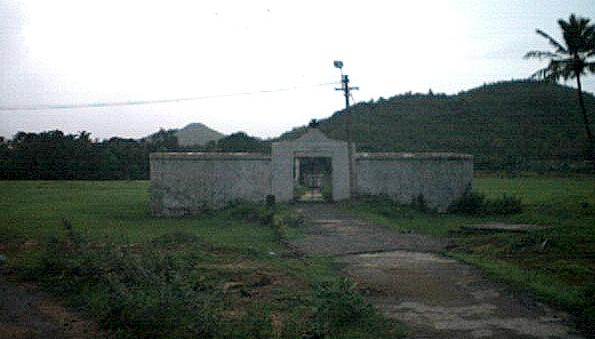
Village cemetery

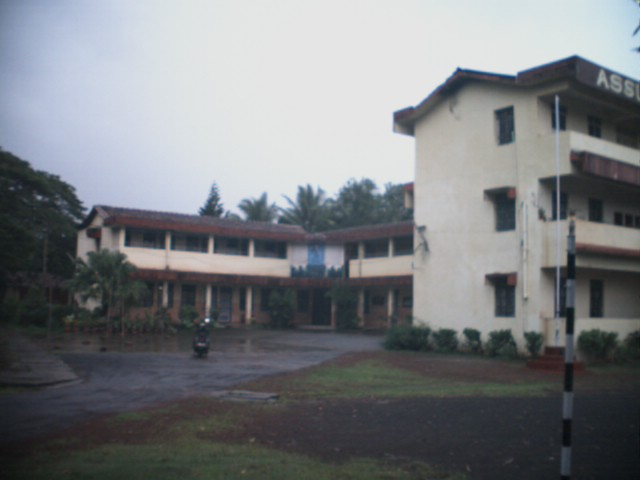
Assumpta Convent School

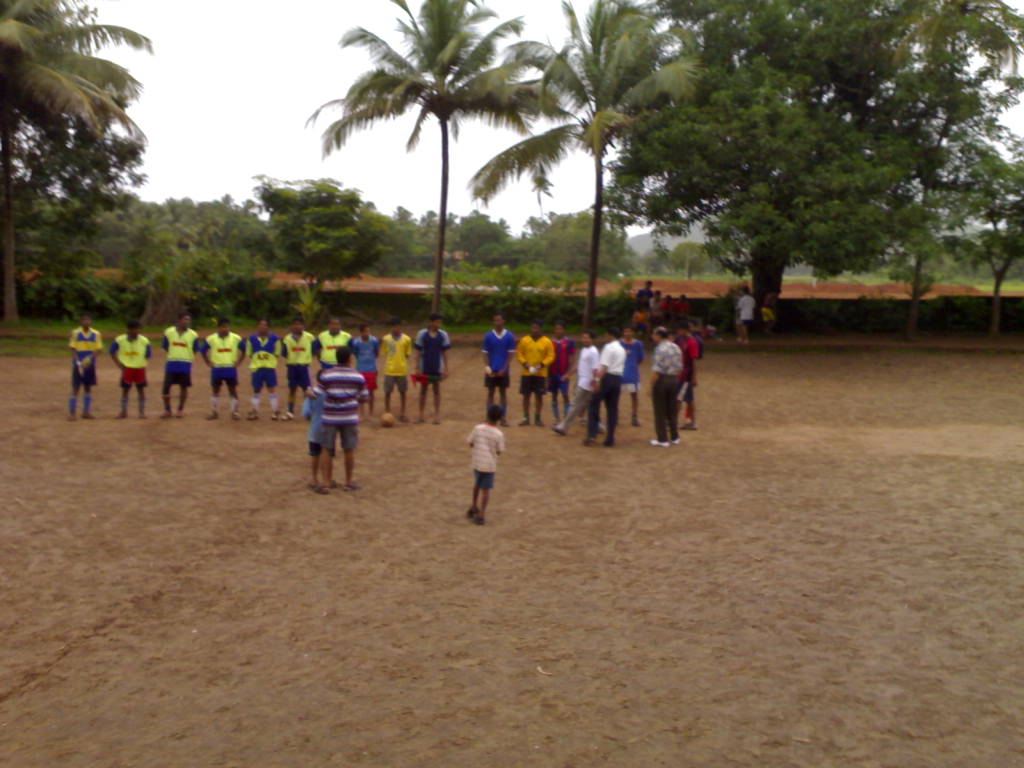
Football tournament

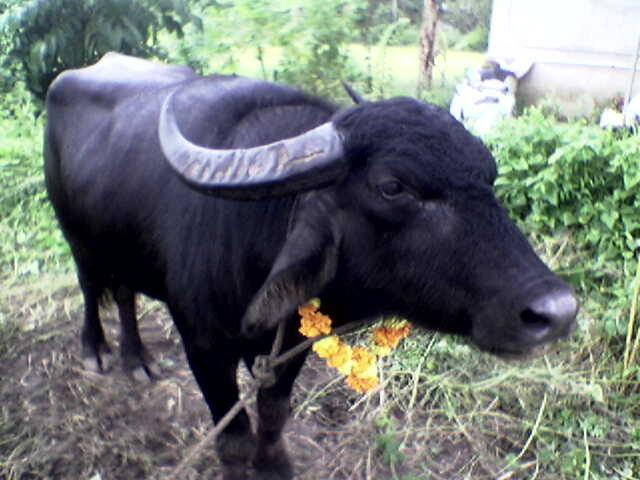
The fighter-bull, Mangal Pandey
