= Cavelossim =

- village
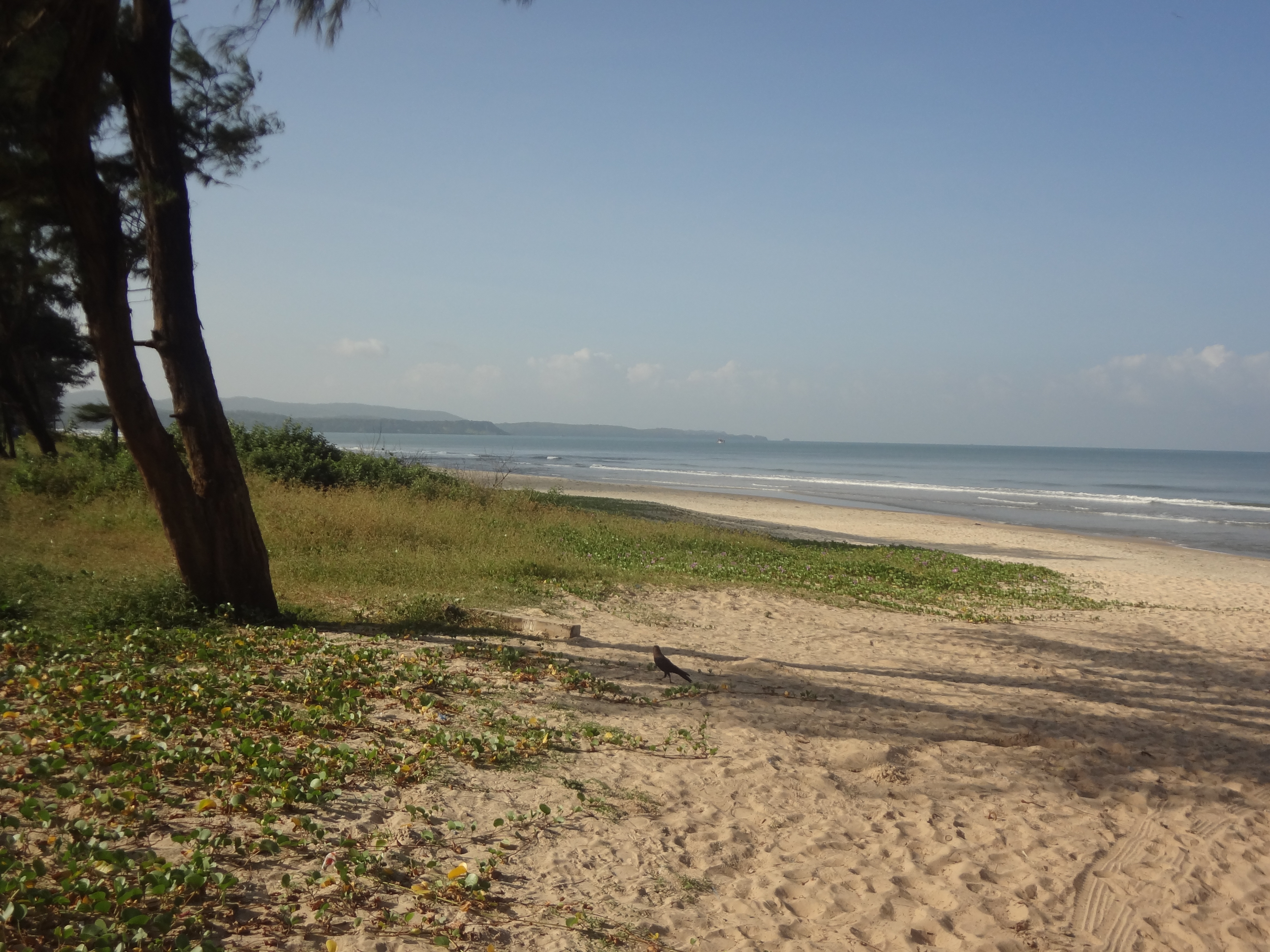
- Cavelossim beach in 2012

- Location in Goa, India Cavelossim (India)
- Coordinates: 15.174°N 73.945°E
- Country: India
- State: Goa
- District: South Goa
- Elevation: 3 m (9.8 ft)

Population (2011)
  - Total: 1,955

Languages
  - Official: Konkani
- Time zone: UTC+5:30 (IST)
- PIN: 403731
- Vehicle registration: GA
- Website: goa.gov.in

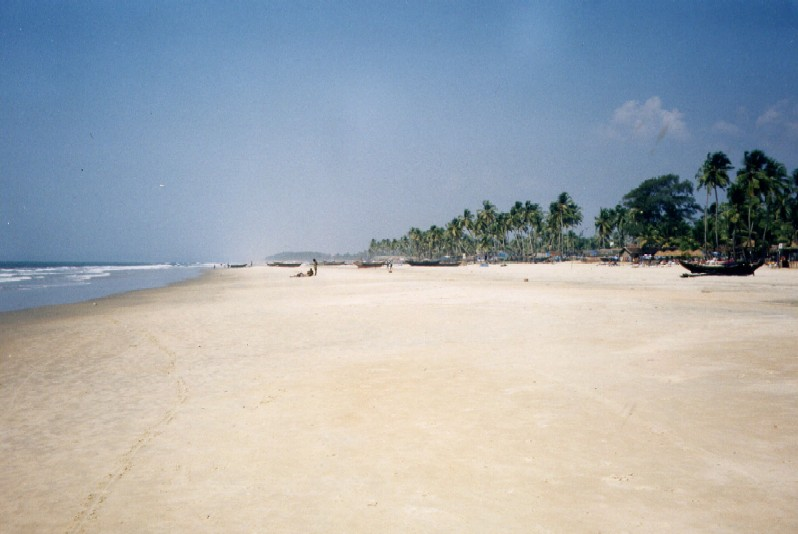

Cavelossim is a village in South Goa district in the state of Goa, India.

The village hosts a well-known beach at the southernmost tip of the Salcete beach stretch that starts from Majorda in the north to Cavelossim in the south. The Sal River flows into the Arabian Sea at the south of this village.

== History ==
The only attraction was a small temple which housed the idol of the Hindu goddess Shantadurga, believed to be located around 100 metres (330 ft) behind the current location of the church of Santa Cruz. (This temple is not to be confused with the much larger temple to the same deity in Deoolbhat, Quelossim, a similarly named village located between Mormugao and Salcete.)

=== Tradition ===
It is said that a usurped Raja, Prince Rama, a scion of the Nayaka dynasties, wandering aimlessly after his defeat, was finally granted asylum in the village of Cavelossim, as there were very few of prominence residing there to oppose. Some suggest he belonged to Nayakas of Keladi and relocated as late as the 1500s with his remaining loyal soldiers and officers. Hence several families in Cavelossim trace their lineage to Nayaka and Vijayanagara officers and had the different vaddos (wards or parishes) renamed in their honour. Though it is claimed that the exiled ruler married into the temple family, it seems unlikely as it would have been an inter-caste marriage.

It is instead believed that the Raja and his followers rather became patrons of the temple, helping it quickly became one of the largest in the region, with the manor house of descendants of the prince's followers– who are often called Rampotas or Rajpotas ('sons of King Rama') –in the temple premises. The gold coins and medallions housed by the family and church are yet to be dated and estimated.

=== Transition to Portuguese Goa ===
After the Portuguese conquest of Goa, the majority of the villagers accepted the Christian faith and the temple fell out of use, reducing it nearly to the status of a mere outbuilding of the temple family's house. This family went on to take the name of Rodrigues.

During the Spanish Inquisition which spilled over to Goa as the Goa Inquisition, New Christians were forced to rid themselves of idols of other religions to prevent Crypto-Hinduism. In the 17th century, the family requested officials to let the main idol be transported beyond the borders of that time to the village of Kavale in Ponda. Here it remains even today, near the larger main idol from Quelossim in the temple built by Shahu Bhosale I in 1720. As an act of faith, in 1763 the family constructed a chapel dedicated to the holy cross, Igreja de Santa Cruz, which came under the jurisdiction of the parish of Carmona.

Being fed by the Sal River, Cavelossim boasted lush fields and multiple fisheries which granted its communidade a hefty zonn or jono (dividend), with which the villagers were able to make sizeable donations to build a cemetery and expand the chapel to its current size. It was recognized as a separate parish church in 1948. The main side gate of the church was accompanied by three pairs of pillars: the first of the church itself; the ones behind leading to the Rodrigues manor were testimony to its first patrons, who still share the back walls of the church; and the third, opposite the church, bearing lions to the erstwhile influential Gomes family, whose founder was one of the early presidente da camara de salcete following Portuguese acceptance of self-governance amongst Goans.

== People and culture ==
=== Demographics ===
As of the 2011 India census, Cavelossim had a population of 1,955. Males constituted 51% of the population and females 49%. Cavelossim had an average literacy rate of 90.35%, higher than the national average of 74.04%: male literacy was 93.12%; and female literacy 87.56%. The population under 6 years of age was 9.87% of the total.

=== Sports ===
As in many other Goan villages, Cavelossim's most popular sport is football. Santa Cruz Club of Cavelossim, a football club based in Cavelossim, represents them in Goa's top-tier league, the Goa Professional League. They play home matches at the Cavelossim Football Ground.

== Geography and features ==
=== Cavelossim Beach ===
Cavelossim Beach is located 15 kilometres (9.3 mi) south of Margao, the district headquarters of South Goa, and lies between the River Sal to the east and the Arabian Sea to its west. It is known for its contrasting black lava rocks and white sand. Considered a peaceful beach, it attracts many tourists. Besides relaxing or swimming at the beach, dolphin-sighting boat trips out to sea are offered from Cavelossim. It was ranked fourth best beach in Asia by Tripadvisor in 2022. Other neighbouring beaches include Carmona Beach to the north and Mobor Beach to the south.
