= Savia Viegas =

Indian artist and writer (born 1957)

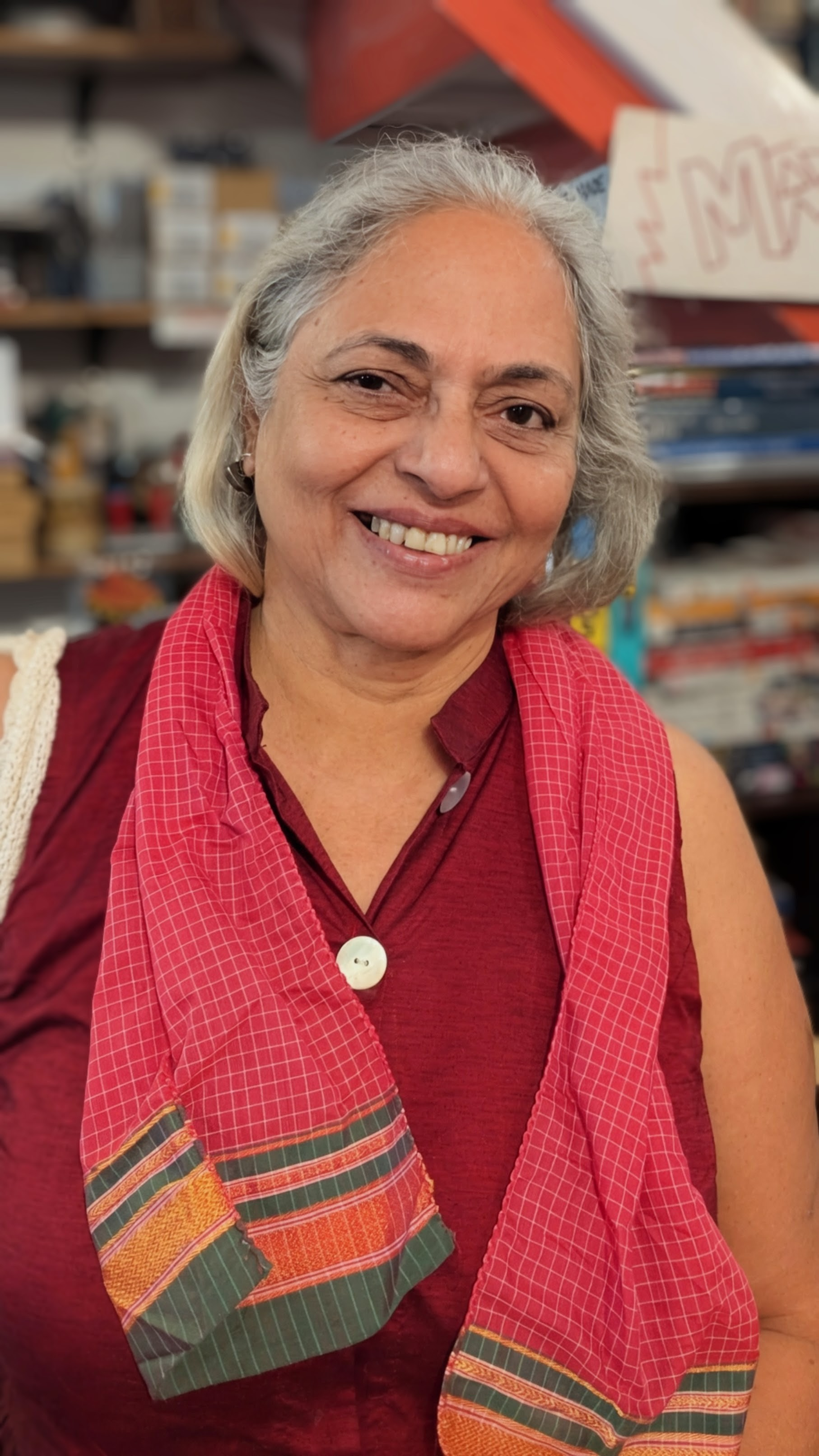
- Viegas in 2025
- Born: Maria Savia Viegas; 30 October 1957 (age 68); Carmona, Goa, India
- Education: Parvatibai Chowgule College; Elphinstone College; University of Mumbai
- Occupations: Writer, artist
- Notable work: Let me tell you about Quinta
- Spouse: Anoop Bablani (m. 1979)
- Website: saviaviegas.in

Maria Savia Viegas (born 30 October 1957) is an Indian artist, writer, curator and academic from the village of Carmona in South Goa. She is best known for her mixed-media works that are a combination of community oral histories, up-cycled textiles and embroidery to explore Goan identity, memory and women's narratives.

== Early and personal life ==
Maria Savia Viegas was born on 30 October 1957 in the village of Xetmalem, Carmona, Goa. Her mother, Berta Elisa Viegas, taught embroidery locally and this influenced Savia's later art.

Viegas completed her schooling at St Pius X Convent, Orlim, followed by college at Parvatibai Chowgule College and Elphinstone College in Mumbai. She later earned a doctorate in Ancient Indian Art from the University of Mumbai and was awarded the Fulbright Program to USA, where she worked with the Smithsonian Institution.

Viegas married Anoop Bablani in 1979. They love cycling together and this inspired them to a write a book together, Bicycle Diaries, about the history of bicycles.

== Career ==
Viegas worked in Mumbai for the Times of India Group. She then worked as a researcher with the Research Centre for Women's Studies, SNDT Women's University, Mumbai. She briefly worked at the Xavier Institute of Communications before joining a University of Mumbai college, teaching Indian Art History till 2005.

After working in Mumbai, Viegas returned to her ancestral home in Carmona in 2005, where she founded a pre-primary school, Saxtti Kids, and focused her energies on writing, painting and curatorial work. Viegas is a journalist, scriptwriter, writer, art historian and museum curator.

== Artistic work ==
One of Viegas's major works is Carmona's Talking Quilt, created in collaboration with her mother. It uses up-cycled denim from out-grown jeans, embroidered motifs, photographs and mixed-media panels to surface hidden stories of village life, memory and women's experience.

In a feature by The Hindu, she is described as using denim quilts, embroidery and archival photographs to unpack Goan village histories, gendered craft practices and processes of memory.

== Other professional roles ==
Besides her art practice, Viegas is active as a curator and educator, facilitating creative writing workshops and exhibiting works that engage local communities, women's craft traditions and sustainable reuse of materials.

== Themes and approach ==
Viegas's work often engages with the material traces of daily life—old jeans, embroideries, family stories—and re-configures them into visual narratives about identity, heritage and transformation. She emphasises the value of craft traditionally seen as women's work, and uses it to articulate cultural memory and belonging.

== Exhibitions ==
Her exhibition Carmona's Talking Quilt was held at the Museum of Goa (MOG) in Pilerne, Goa, where viewers could engage with textile works, photographic montages and embroidery panels that decode village-level narratives of the Goan hinterland.

== Reception and impact ==
Critics and commentators note that Viegas's quilts and multimedia works offer an alternative archive of Goan rural life and women's culture, tapping into oral storytelling, craft and material reuse to challenge dominant historical narratives.

== Works ==
- The Bicycle Diaries, co-authored with her husband Anoop Bablani
- Tales from the Attic
- In the Hour of Eclipse
- Let me tell you about Quinta
- Eddi and Didi
- Abha Nama
