= Carmona, Goa =

Village in Goa, India

Coordinates: 15°12′N 73°57′E

Carmona is a village in the state of Goa, India. Located in the Salcette taluka of the South Goa district. It shares a border with Orlim village in the North, Cavelossim village in the South whilst the river Sal runs along its Eastern edge from North to South and the Arabian Sea to its West.

The village of Carmona is sub-divided into wards (Vaddos) which includes Xiro, Fondo, Ratmadem, Kirbhat, Olavado, Choqui, Tamdeg, Batti, Batti Viegas, Xhetmalem, Jorge, Ankur Luis, Igreja, DeMello, Gavona, Alemao and Zalor.

== Religion ==
=== Ancient Temples ===
- Mahadeva
- Ague-Betall
- Purusha
- Uddio

=== Churches & Chapels ===
- Our Lady of Succour Church, Carmona - Built in 1607, originally part of the Jesuit Novitiate House which is now the Parochial residence. Renovation of Our Lady of Succour Church, Carmona commenced in 2004.
- Our Lady of Piety Chapel, Zalor constructed in 1881
- St. Sebastian Chapel, Xiro

== School ==
Sacred Heart of Jesus High School

== Comunidade ==
It consists of ten Vangors of the Chardo class. The old Gaunkars used the surnames 'Naik', 'Garo' (Gadd) and 'Porto'.

== Notable people ==
- Menino Figueiredo, Goa's 1st International Football Player
- Savia Viegas, Academic and Writer
- Evágrio Jorge, Freedom Fighter
- Fr. Antonio Cruz da Piedade Viegas, Priest
- Fr. Maurice Figueiredo, Diocesan Director of Catechetics in the Diocese of Pune, Director of Salesian Catechetical Centre, Pune, Director of Don Bosco Youth Centre, Benaulim, Goa, and Member of the Diocesan Priest Council, of the Arch-diocese of Goa
- Venzy Viegas, Member of Legislative Assembly (Benaulim Constituency), Aam Aadmi Party
