= Chinchinim =

Town in Goa, India

Chinchinim Chinchonnem
- Town
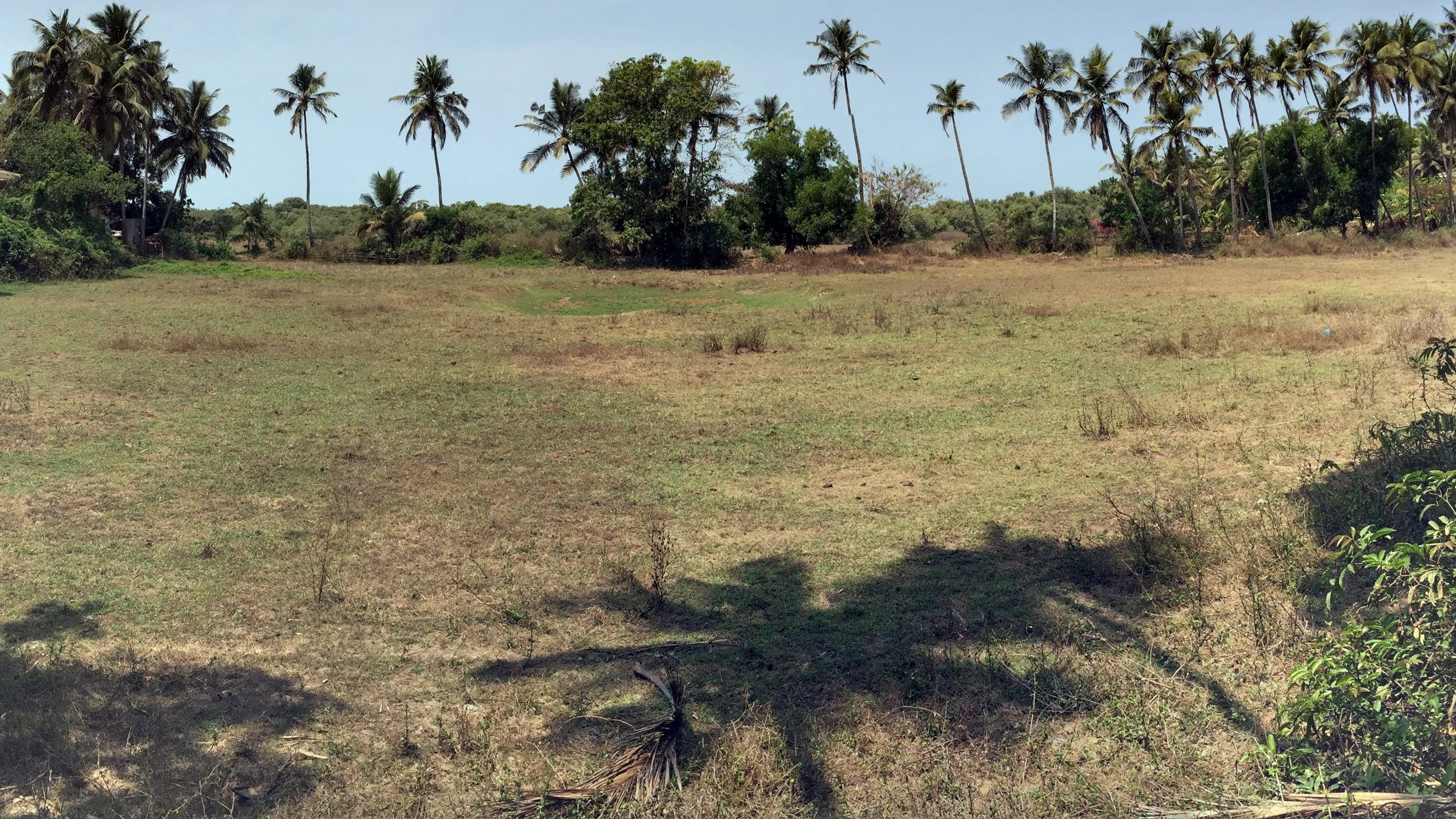
- Rural landscape of Chinchinim, 2019

- Location of Chinchinim in Goa Chinchinim (India)
- Coordinates: 15°12′45″N 73°58′38″E
- Country: India
- State: Goa
- District: South Goa
- Subdistrict: Salcete
- Elevation: 16 m (52 ft)

Population (2011)
  - Total: 6,908
- Time zone: UTC+5:30 (IST)
- PIN: 403 715

Chinchinim is a census town in located in the Indian coastal of Goa. It is situated in the Salcete taluka of South Goa district.

== Geography ==
Chinchinim is located at 15.2145°N 73.9755°E. It has an elevation of 16 m (52 ft). It lies on the banks of the River Sal.

== History ==
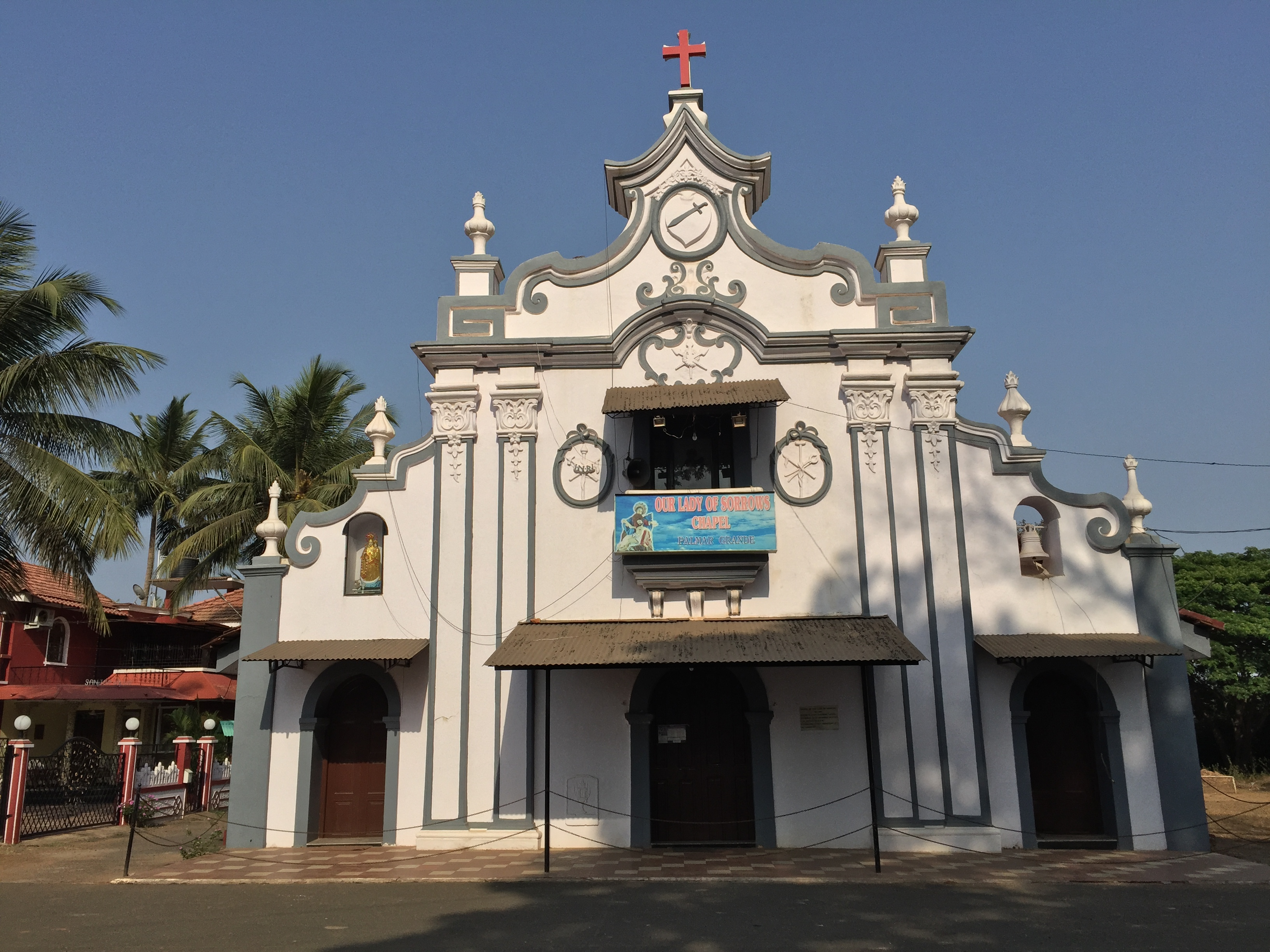
Chapel of Our Lady of Sorrows in Palmar Grande, Chinchinim

The name 'Chinchinim' is derived from 'Chinchinath', the local deity, from one of the four temples present in Chinchinim. These temples are said to be destroyed by the Portuguese in AD 1567. The other view is that the temples simply disappeared as the devotees converted to Christianity. Another possible etymology of Chinchinim comes from 'Chinch' the Konkani word for "Tamarind" since in the olden days tamarind trees were abundant in the village.

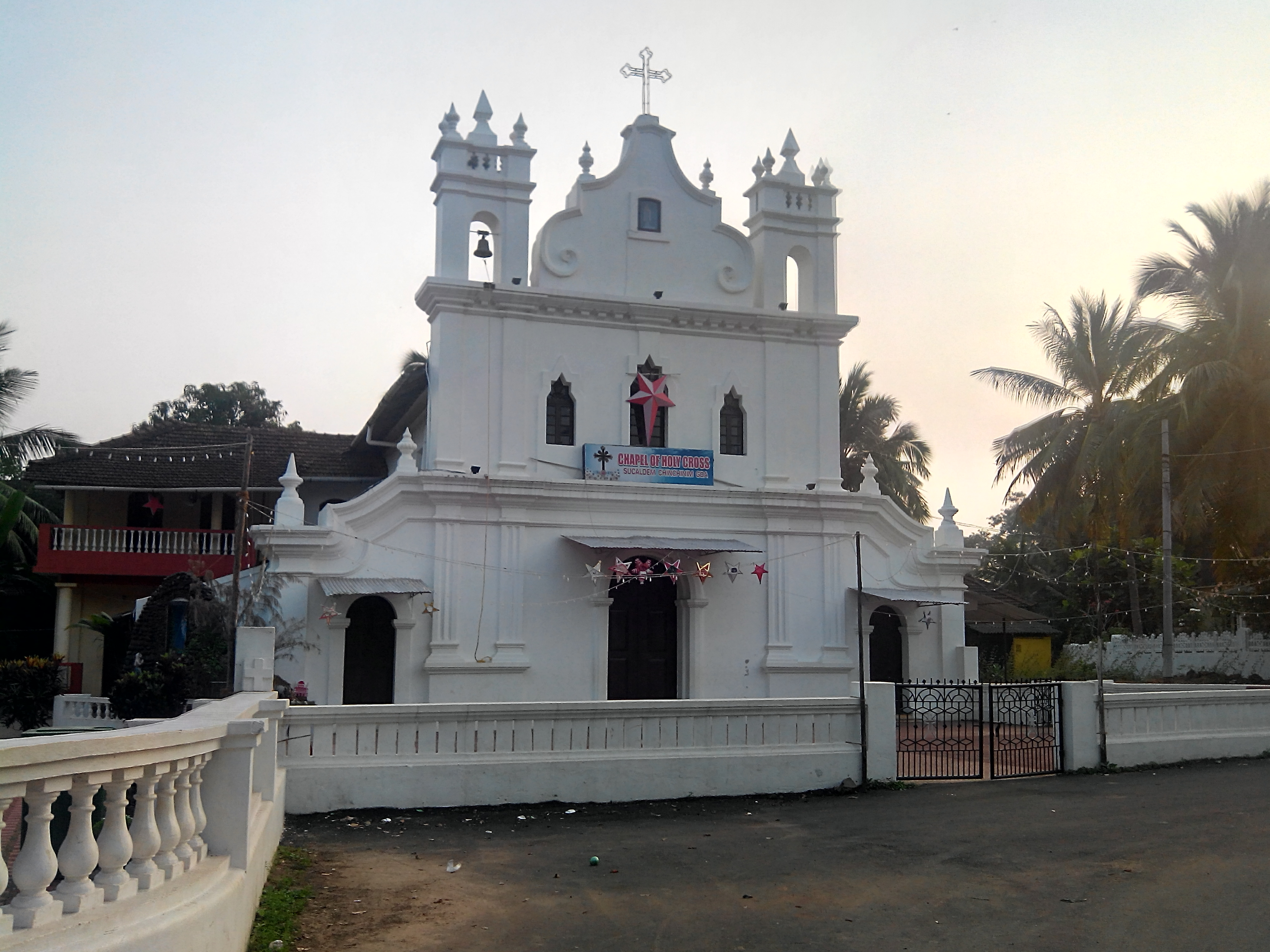
Chapel of Holy Cross in Sucaldem, Chinchinim

A church dedicated to St Anne was built in AD 1590 by the Jesuits. It was built by contributions from the Communidade of the village and the neighbouring villages. The church was burnt during the Muslim invasions, and the present Our Lady of Hope church was built in AD 1627, which was also burnt during the Maratha invasion in AD 1739. The repairs were done in the following years. Chinchinim also houses the Chapel of St Sebastian, frequented by people of all religions for the last century.

Our Lady of Hope Church in 2026

At the beginning of the twentieth century, there was a great plague in Goa, killing many in Chinchinim. A local doctor named Dr Miguel de Loyola Furtado or simply Doctor Minglu worked tirelessly to save as many lives as he could, but then, the flu hit the village, and his works seemed to be all in vain. At that time, he along with the Vicar of the church, got the Lumanaria started in homage to St Sebastian, where on each day, one group of Chinchinim residents would take the image of St Sebastian to their homes and accompany it back to the church square with great pomp and reverence.

The flu cleared out, and many people were saved, while Doctor Minglu died in the epidemic, ironically, while he was the leader fighting it.

After his death, the Lumanirias continued, however, of the days kept for each group of Chinchinim residents, now segregated by wards, one day was reserved for the family and relatives of Doctor Minglu.

Doctor Minglu is also known for his daughter and oldest son, who were Goa's fearless writers, who haunted both the Portuguese rulers and the anti-Portuguese. Their works related to Goa and how Goa laid at the centre of the Portuguese Empire.

His son Mario de Loiola Furtado carried a newspaper column Manual de Rua which means 'Street guide' which awoke and enlightened many a Goan. He made Goans realise that they were not ruled by the Portuguese, but they ruled Portugal. Their votes counted in deciding who ruled Portugal and in Portugal's and the colonies' destiny.

His daughter Leonor, or Lulita as she was known, took journalism to new levels as far as Goans and women are concerned, with the family publication, India Purtuguesa.

His second son Dr Alvaro de Loiola Furtado, as the last president of the Partido Indiano and as the brains behind Dr Jack de Sequeira in the United Goans Party, was instrumental in assuring Goa's identity, at a time when a few Goans tried to get Goa merged into neighbouring Maharashtra. It is also the birthplace of Lord Querobino Rodrigues.

In the game of football, Chinchinim has produced some of India's greatest sons.

== Demographics ==
It has a predominant Goan Catholic population and is dotted with typical Goan mansions and small cottages which are colourful and incorporate all the typical features of a Goan village life.

Chinchinim had a population of 6,908 of which 3,263 are males while 3645 are females as per the 2011 India census.

== Notable people ==
- Mario de Loyola Furtado (1913–1946) — Portuguese journalist and lawyer
- Alvaro de Loyola Furtado (1914–1981) — former member of the Goa, Daman and Diu Legislative Assembly
- Roy de Chinchinim, Indian playwright and theatre director
