= Partido Indiano =

Former Political party in Portuguese Goa

Indian Party Portuguese: Partido Indiano
- Abbreviation: UFG
- Leader: José Inácio de Loyola (first); Alvaro de Loiola Furtado (last)
- Founded: 1865
- Dissolved: 1963
- Merged into: United Goans Party (UGP)
- Headquarters: Margão
- Ideology: Anti-colonialism; Regionalism
- Political position: Centre Left
- Colors: Red

The Partido Indiano (Indian Party) was one of the oldest political parties of Goa.

== History ==
=== Foundation ===
As per a decree passed in Lisbon in 1865, natives of Portuguese colonies were now allowed to form their own political parties. Taking advantage of this, a small section of the Goan Chardo elite from Orlim, seeking political and civil rights and founded the Partido Indiano. It enjoyed mass support particularly from the Catholic majority. The party was a response to the pro-establishment Partido Ultramarino (Overseas Party).

=== Post annexation of Goa ===
Sensing the erasure of Goan identity, post the invasion of Goa by the Indian army, the Partido Indiano merged with 3 other native parties to form the United Goans Party, in 1963.

== See also ==
- United Front of Goans
- Margão Revolt (1890)
