= Alexandre Moniz Barbosa =

Indian journalist and writer

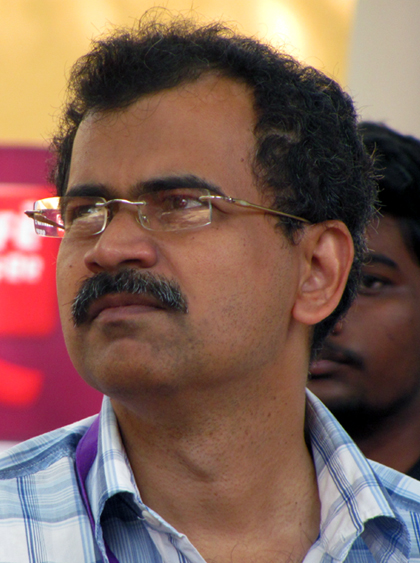
- Barbosa in 2010
- Occupations: Journalist; writer
- Website: x.com/Monizbarbosa

Alexandre Moniz Barbosa is an Indian journalist and writer. He is the winner of the 2013 biennial Goan Short Story competition.

== Journalism ==
Barbosa has written, among other things, for The Times of India. After a spell as assistant editor at Goa Today, he became assistant resident editor for The Times of India, Goa edition. He was editor of O Heraldo from 2018 to 2022.

== Literary writing ==
Barbosa wrote the novel Touched By The Toe (2004), set in sixteenth-century Goa, and taking its name an incident in which a Portuguese noblewoman bit off a toe from the relics of St Francis Xavier. He translated from Portuguese to English essays by José Inácio Candido de Loyola, as Passionate and Unrestrained (2008).

In 2011, Barbosa published the book Goa Rewound, a socio-political commentary on Goa.

In 2016 he published the novel Raw Earth, set in contemporary Goa with mining as a backdrop to the plot. Kaddio Boddio, a collection of short stories, was published in 2022. He has also written scholarly articles and short stories.
