= José Inácio Cândido de Loyola =

Goan journalist and activist (1891–1973)

- Born: 11 March 1891; Salcete, Goa, Portuguese India
- Died: 1973 (aged 81–82); Portugal
- Other name: Fanchu Loyola
- Occupations: Journalist; political activist
- Years active: 1910s–1940s
- Spouse: Amy Amelia D'Souza (m. 1917)
- Children: 4
- Relatives: Alvaro de Loyola Furtado (nephew); Mario de Loyola Furtado (nephew)

José Inácio Cândido de "Fanchu" Loyola (11 March 1891 – 1973) was a Goan journalist and political activist, who was, in the words of Goan writer Charles Borges, was "Goa's foremost nationalist". He is noted for his journalism and political activism in support of human rights and democracy, humanism, anti-colonialism, and Goan independence.

== Early life ==
Born in the home of his maternal grandparents, de Loyola was the son of Avertano Loyola and Maria Angelica Conceicão Gomes, who were prominent in the Partido Indiano, a political party associated with the Chardó caste. His uncle José Inácio de Loyola was a lawyer, owner of A Índia Portuguesa (itself the paper of the Partido Indiano), and a fierce critic of Portuguese colonialism in India. At the time of de Loyola's birth both his father and uncle were in exile in British India, not returning to Portuguese Goa until September 1891.

== Career ==
De Loyola edited and founded various newspapers, among them the Jornal da India, though these tended to be suppressed by the government. When the Jornal da India, for example, was suspended in 1913 by then Governor-General of Portuguese India, Francisco Manuel Couceiro da Costa, de Loyola published an open letter to the Governor-General criticising the inhibition of his freedom of speech entitled Cara Politíca and proceeded to found the new Rebate.

In 1926, de Loyola was the strategist behind the election of Prazeres da Costa to the Superior Council of Colonies. Among his writings and speeches, he became particularly noted for his speech "Basta" ("enough is enough"), a pro-democracy and anti-colonial speech given on 25 November 1932. In the 1930s, de Loyola moved to Bombay, British India, where he edited Portugal e Colonias. While inspector of village communities, in 1927, he undertook agricultural experiments in Carambolim, and wrote extensively on the possibilities for Goa's economic development.

In May 1946, he and Loutolim's Vicente João de Figueiredo co-founded the daily publication, A Vóz da India. It was later sold to a Goan group consisting of 10 Catholics and 10 Hindus.

On 11 October 1946, he was arrested, sentenced to four years' imprisonment and the removal of his political rights for fifteen years, and deported to Peniche Fortress until his early and conditional release on 12 January 1947.

While at Peniche jail, he and the other freedom fighters, Rama Hegde, Purushottam Kakodkar, T. B. Cunha and Laxmikant Bhembre, hosted the newlywed Pundalik Gaitonde and Edila Gaitonde for their honeymoon. These prisoners organised a celebration in honour of Pundalik and Edila. They hosted a meal for the newly-weds.

De Loyola remained in Portugal until 1958, but after Goa's annexation by India returned to Portugal: "Disillusioned and too old to take up the fight, he returned to Lisbon to live in isolation and mourn the loss of his beloved Goa". He died in Portugal in 1973.

== Personal life ==
In 1917, de Loyola married Amy Amelia D'Souza, daughter of Thomas D'Souza and herself highly educated; they had three girls and a boy.

== Bibliography ==
Many of Loyola's writings are available in English translation:

- Goa’s Foremost Nationalist José Inácio Candido de Loyola: The Man and his Writings, ed. by Charles Borges, trans. by Lino Leitão (New Delhi: Concept Publishing, 2000)
- José Inácio Candido de Loyola, Passionate and Unrestrained, trans. by Alexandre Moniz Barbosa (Panjim: Broadway Book Centre, 2008)
