= Mario de Loyola Furtado =

Portuguese lawyer and journalist (1913–1946)

- Born: 26 April 1913; Fatrade, Goa, Portuguese India
- Died: 30 October 1946 (aged 33); Goa, Portuguese India
- Monuments: Adv. Mario de Loyola Furtado Memorial, Chinchinim, Goa, India
- Occupations: Lawyer; journalist
- Known for: Role in Goan civil rights
- Notable work: A India Purtuguesa
- Children: 3
- Relatives: Alvaro de Loyola Furtado (brother)

Mario de Loyola Furtado (26 April 1913 – 30 October 1946) was a Portuguese lawyer and one of Goa's premier journalists. His family ran a newspaper titled the A India Purtuguesa, which was an avenue for Goans troubled by the Portuguese rule.

== Goans civil rights ==
Though, neither the newspaper nor his columns can be classified as anti-Portuguese, Loyola Furtado brought about a new chapter where Goans could criticize and lash out at the Portuguese regime and bring its lapses to the fore. He hails from the Loyola-Furtado family, who were instrumental in assuring civil rights to Goans, equal to the rights enjoyed by people in Portugal, Loyola Furtado worked hard in ensuring that Goans were treated in equilibrium with the (Konkani: Pakle) or, the white people.

While Jose Inacio de Loyola and Francisco Luis Gomes ensured that legislations were passed to ensure civil rights, Loyola Furtado ensured that Goans were aware of such legislations and enough Goans worked to uphold them. His stature normally arose to greater cultural heights at carnival times, with "Khell Tiatrs" staged all over the place, specially from the balcao of his ancestral home at Chinchinim.

== Death ==
Furtado died in 1946 at a young age of 33, he was remembered by his surviving contemporaries as a legal luminary. He left behind his wife and three sons.

== Aftermath ==
Furtado's eldest son, Miguel also known as Mick, was South Goa's cultural hero, leading many carnival parades, making sure that Goa's "antique" culture stayed alive. With many paintings, public shows and amusement, he did all he could to keep Goa's and Chinchinim's cultural presence alive. He was known for his carnival "out of the box" performances and vignettes. He died in 1998.

His second son, Rajendra, a lawyer, took a different route, when he en route to establishing a good legal practice, accepted the post as the Court Receiver of the Sociedade Agricola dos Gauncares de Cuncolim, also known as the Cuncolim Condade (County of Cuncolim), In this capacity, he took it upon himself to ensure that the age old system of the Sociedade Agricola dos Gauncares de Cuncolim stayed alive, in times when there was a danger of the same disappearing as an evacuee property.

Rajendra is remembered by some residents of Cuncolim, particularly older residents, for his efforts to preserve the town's traditions and way of life. He died unexpectedly on 30 November 11.

Loyola Furtado's third son, Guido, took the modern route and became a civil engineer and a real estate builder. Guido is known as one amongst Goa's top entrepreneurs. As of October 2021, Guido is the only surviving heir of the family.

== Legacy ==
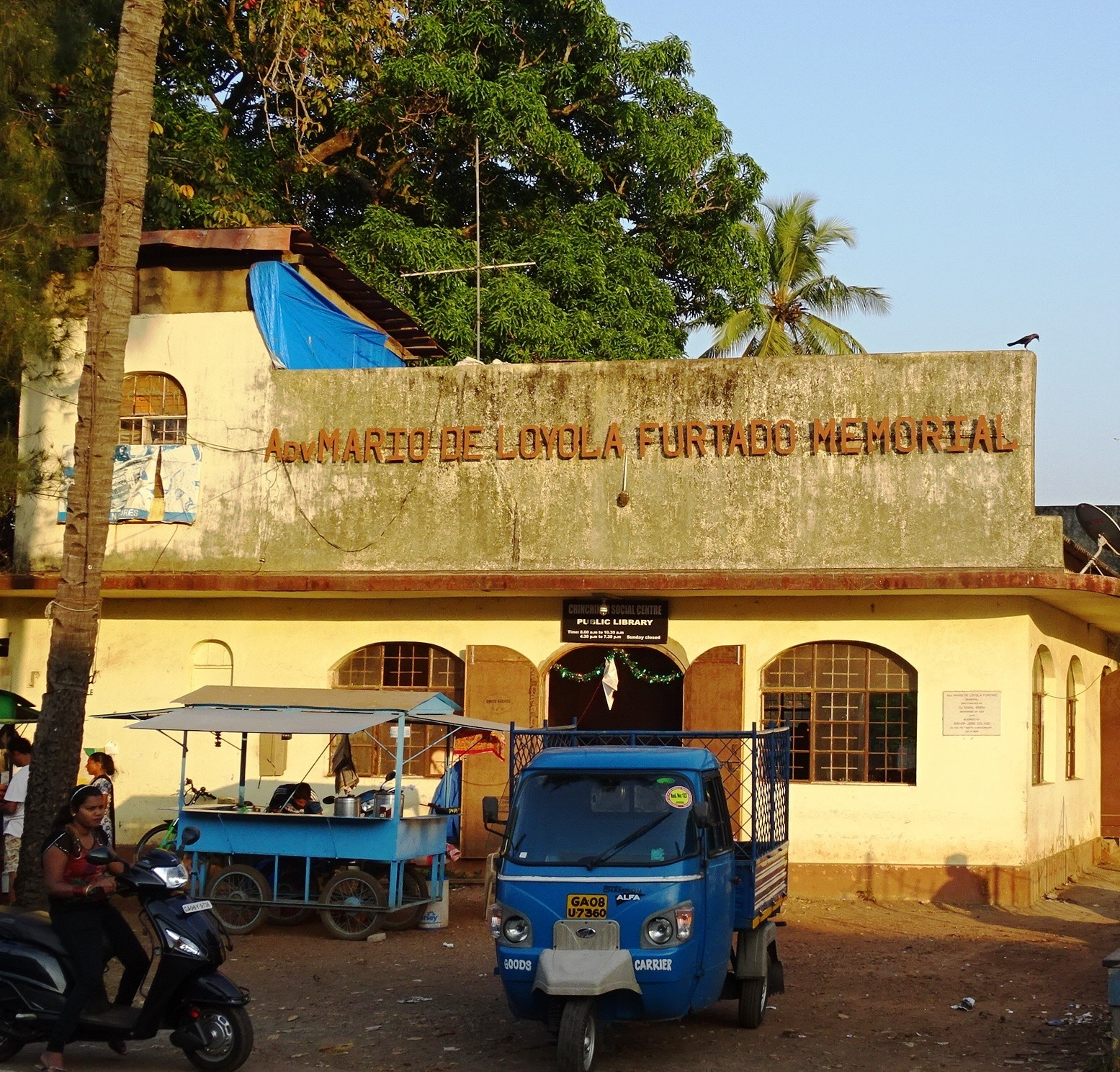
Frontal view of Adv. Mario de Loyola Furtado Memorial

Loyola Furtado's children affiliated with a foundation called "The Chinchinim Social Service" which consisted of all distinguished citizens of Chinchinim. A remarkable hall called "Adv. Mario de Loyola Furtado Memorial" was constructed at a prime centrally place in front of their palatial house.

The hall consisted a public library and space for social gatherings. It was inaugurated on 25 April 1988 with the presence of then Goa Governor, Dr. Gopal Singh, blessed by Bishop Dom José Colaço and the bust unveiled by honourable Law minister, Adv. Sheikh Hassan Haroon.
