= Orlim =

Village in Goa, India

Coordinates: 15°13′14″N 73°57′02″E

Orlim is a village situated in Goa, India. It is part of the Salcete taluka sub-district and is surrounded by the villages of Varca and Carmona. It is located about 10 km from the town of Margao and about 45 km from the capital city of Panjim.

It was a village of Chardos. Those belonging to the village were the first ones in Salcete, among their caste, to be converted. It consisted of five Vangors (Clans) of the Chard class. There were old Gaunkars with the surname Naik.

== Religion ==
=== Ancient Temples ===
- Gotimosor (Gauthameshwar?)
- Purush Kucumba
- Vancadeva
- Maissasor (Mhaishasur?)
- Narayna

=== Current Temples ===
- Vitthal Rakhumai Temple

=== Churches & Chapels ===
- St. Michael the Archangel (São Miguel, Arcanjo) - Built 1568, rebuilt 1590.
- Santa Cruz Chapel
- Our Lady of Rosary Chapel

== Schools ==
- St. Pius X Convent High School, (PBVM), Orlim, Goa

== Places of Interest ==
- St. Michael Community Bridge
- Village Panchayat Orlim

== Notable people ==
- Cardinal Oswald Gracias
- Jose Inacio de Loyola, Politician, Journalist, Activist
- Clara Dias, Actress & Singer

== Gallery ==
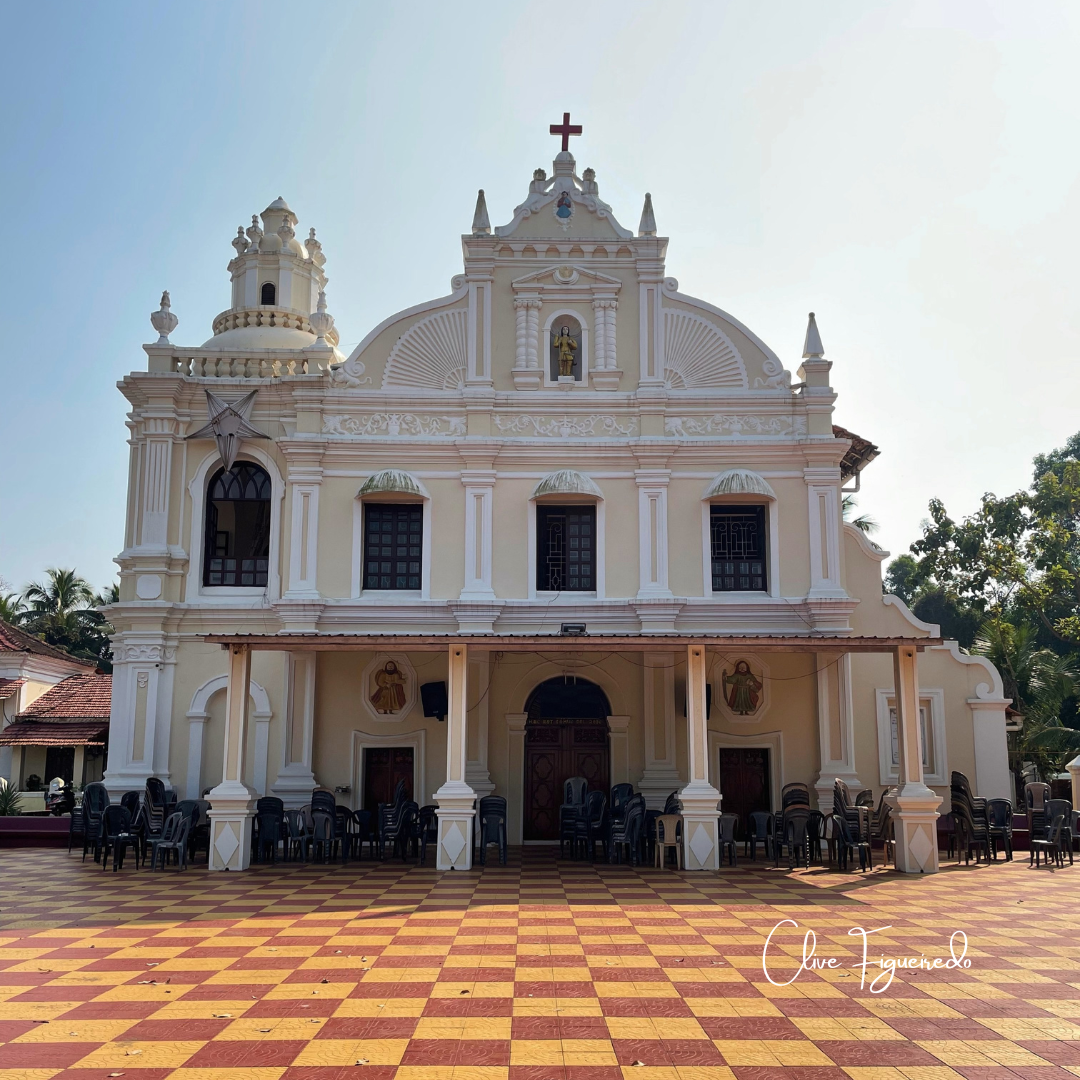
Saint Michael the Archangel Church

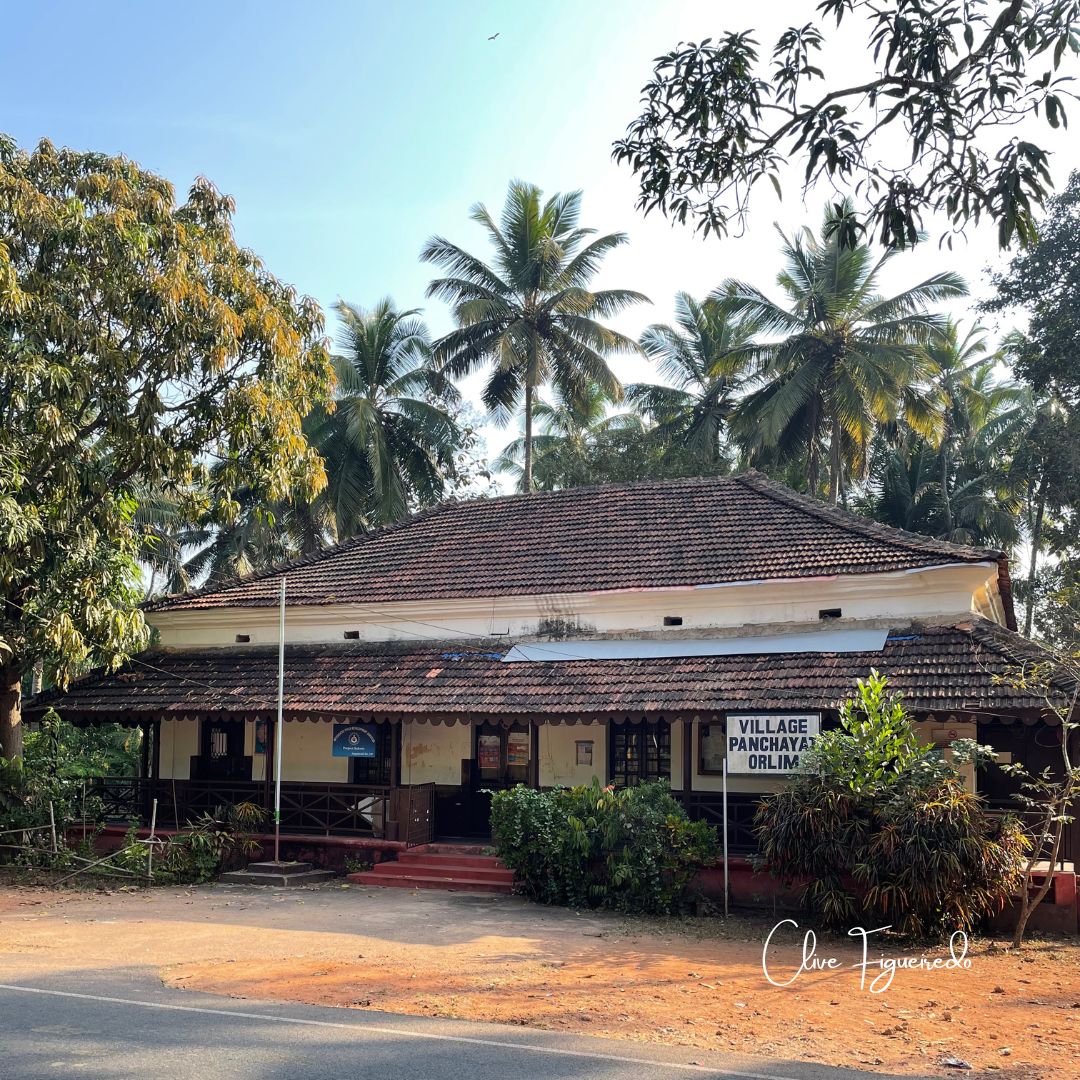
Orlim Panchayat
