= Salcete taluka =

Taluka in South Goa, India

Salcete Konkani: Saxtt Portuguese: Salcete
- Taluka
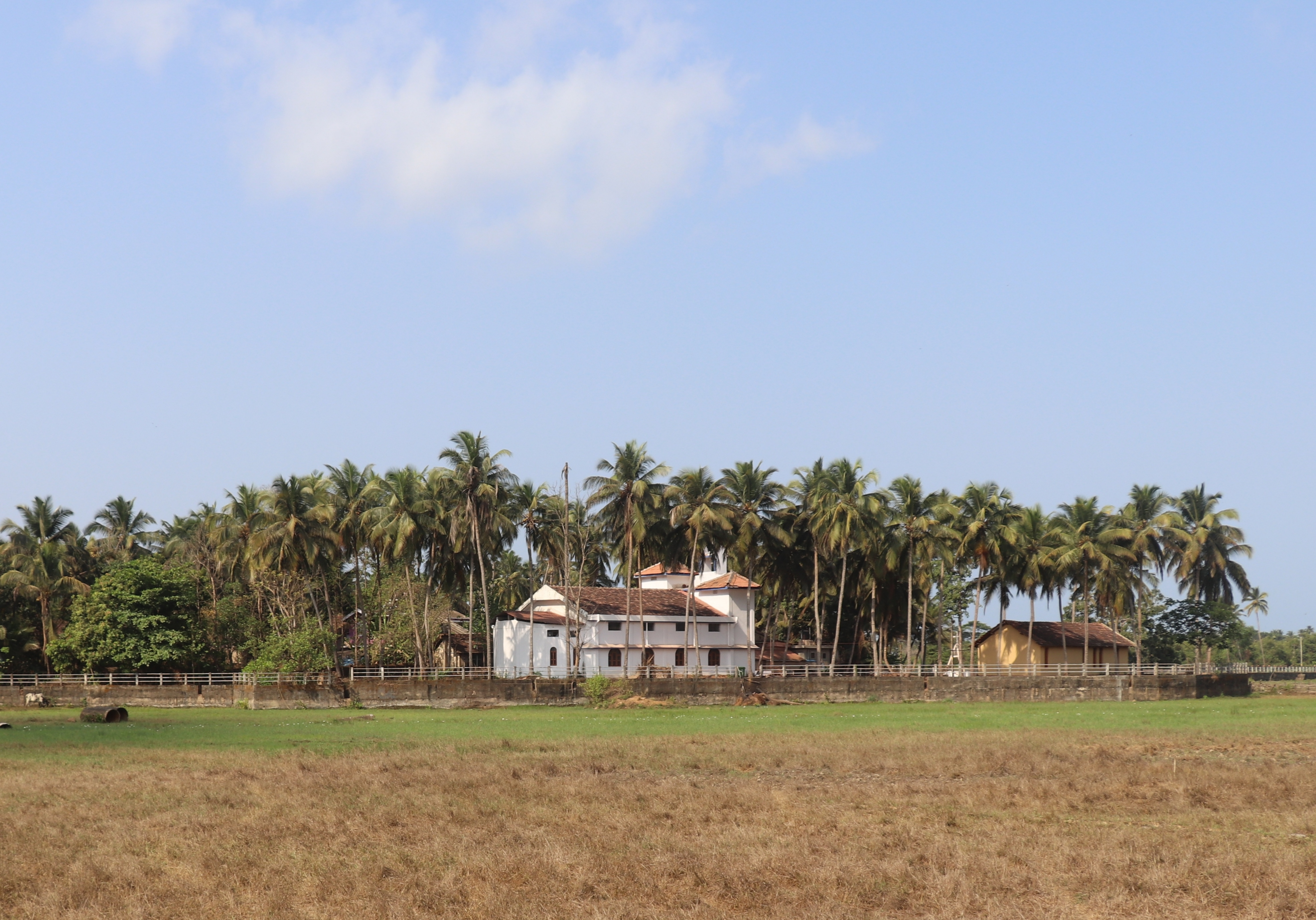
- Salcete countryside

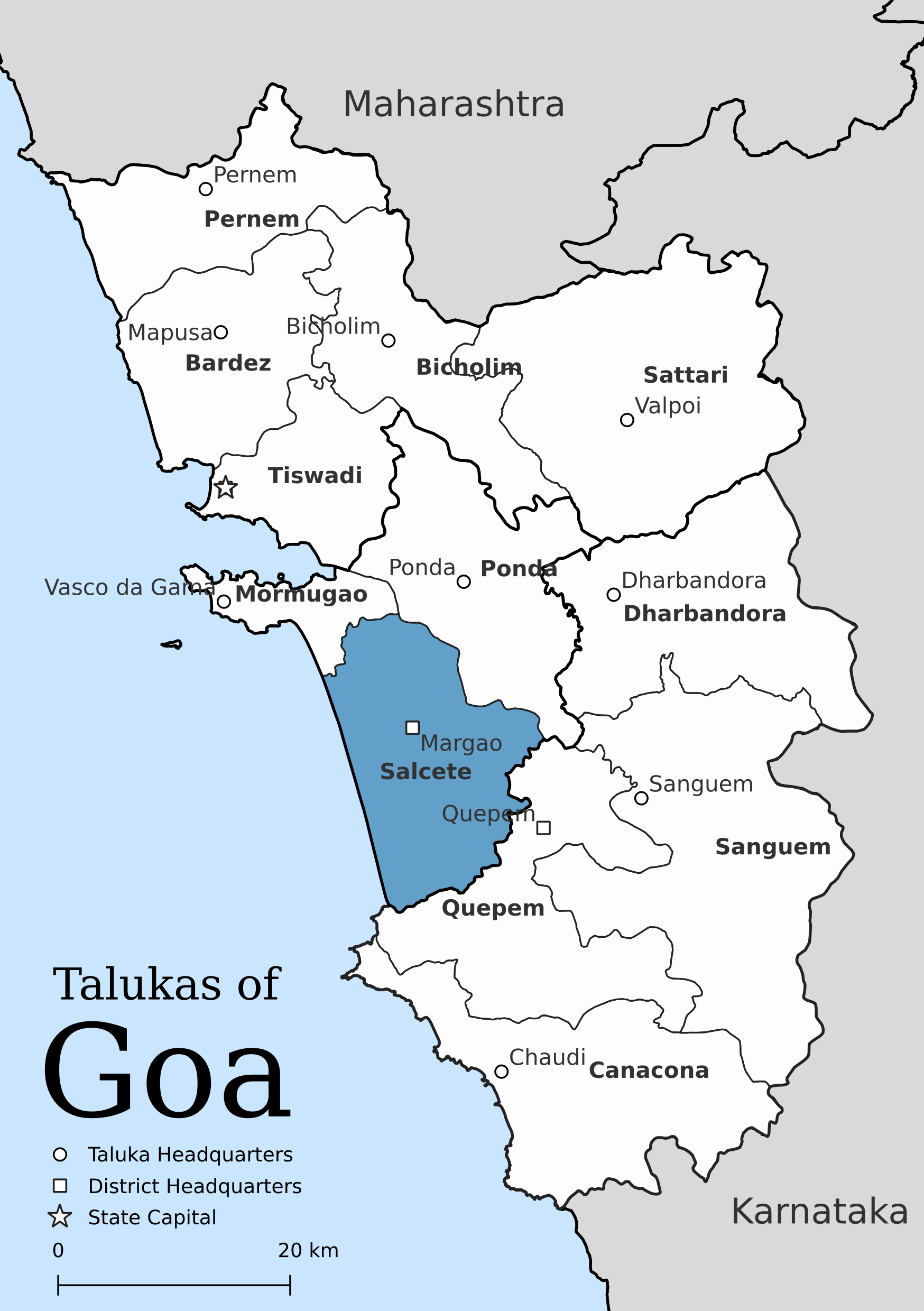
- Location of Salcete in South Goa district in Goa
- Coordinates: 15.212450°N 74.07323°E
- Country: India
- State: Goa
- District: South Goa
- Headquarters: Margao
- Settlements (as of 2011): 2 cities 11 towns 35 villages

Government
  - Deputy Collector: Jyoti Kumari, IAS
  - Talukadar: Prataprao Gaunkar

Population (2011)
  - Total: 294,504
- Demonym: Saxtticar/Xaxtticar
- PIN: 4036XX, 4037XX
- Vehicle registration: GA-08

Salcete is a subdivision of the district of South Goa in the state of Goa, situated by the west coast of India. The Sal River and its backwaters dominate the landscape of Salcete. Historically, the sixty-six settlements south of the Zuari River formed the original Salcette territory. Salcete forms a part of the bigger Konkan region that stretches along the western shoreline of peninsular India.

In erstwhile Portuguese Goa, the Salcette concelho (county), located in the Velhas Conquistas (Old Conquests), was co-terminous with the undivided Salcette territory (Mormugao and Salcete talukas). In 1917, the concelho was bifurcated into the present-day talukas of Mormugao and Salcete. The contemporary Salcete taluka has been classified as a rurban area. Margao serves as the administrative headquarters of both Salcete taluka and the South Goa district.

== Etymology ==
"Salcete" is the modern Portuguese spelling of the toponym, "Salcette" being now considered archaic in Portuguese, but still enjoying use in English. This word, "Salcette", has been derived from Goan Konkani: सासष्टी, romanized: Sāsaṣṭī—a corruption of the Sanskrit: षट्षष्टि, romanized: Ṣaṭṣaṣṭi, lit. 'Sixty-six' (Note: Founded as they seem to be by immigrant Brahmins somewhere between the 4th and the 12th centuries of the present era ... Salcete is the Portuguese corruption of Sāsaṣṭi, the sixty-six settlements which can also be traced in modern times. — Kosambi 1962, p. 169). According to the Hindu mythology of the Konkan, the original sixty-six settlements of the Salcette territory were established by sixty-six Saraswat Brahmin clans who had emigrated here from North India. In Goan Konkani, the natives are referred to as Saxtticar or Xaxtticar; साष्टीकार/षाष्टीकार; Sāṣṭīkār/Ṣāṣṭīkār. The Salcete Konkani dialect of southern Goa known as "Saxtti" is notably different from the "Antruzi" (Ponda) and "Bardescari" (Bardez) dialects of northern Goa.

== History ==
King Viramarmadeva of the Kadamba dynasty issued a copper-plate inscription in 1049 CE concerning a grant of a piece of land called Tudukapura in Kudtarika agrahara of Chhat sathi desha. This inscription suggests that Chhat sathi refers to modern Salcete, known as "Sāṣṭī" in the local language.

== Salcette territory ==
=== Historical Salcette ===
The original sixty-six settlements of Salcette are as follows:

1. Sernabatim
2. Vanelim
3. Colva
4. Seraulim
5. Gandaulim
6. Duncolim
7. Betalbatim
8. Nuvem
9. Calata
10. Gonsua
11. Majorda
12. Utorda
13. Nagoa
14. Verna
15. Loutulim
16. Camurlim
17. Ambora
18. Raia
19. Rachol
20. Curtorim
21. Nesai
22. Macasana
23. Guirdolim
24. Chandor
25. Cavorim
26. Paroda
27. Mulem
28. Sarzora
29. Talvorda
30. Veroda
31. Cuncolim
32. Betul
33. Velim
34. Ambelim
35. Assolna
36. Cavelossim
37. Chinchinim
38. Deussua
39. Carmona
40. Orlim
41. Varca
42. Sirlim
43. Dramapur
44. Dicarpale
45. Davorlim
46. Aquem
47. Telaulim
48. Navelim
49. Margao
50. Benaulim
51. Adsuli
52. Cana
53. Mormugao
54. Vadem
55. Chicalim
56. Dabolim
57. Sancoale
58. Cortalim
59. Quelossim
60. Cuelim
61. Arossim
62. Cansaulim
63. Velsao
64. Pale
65. Issorcim
66. Chilcona

=== Contemporary Salcete ===
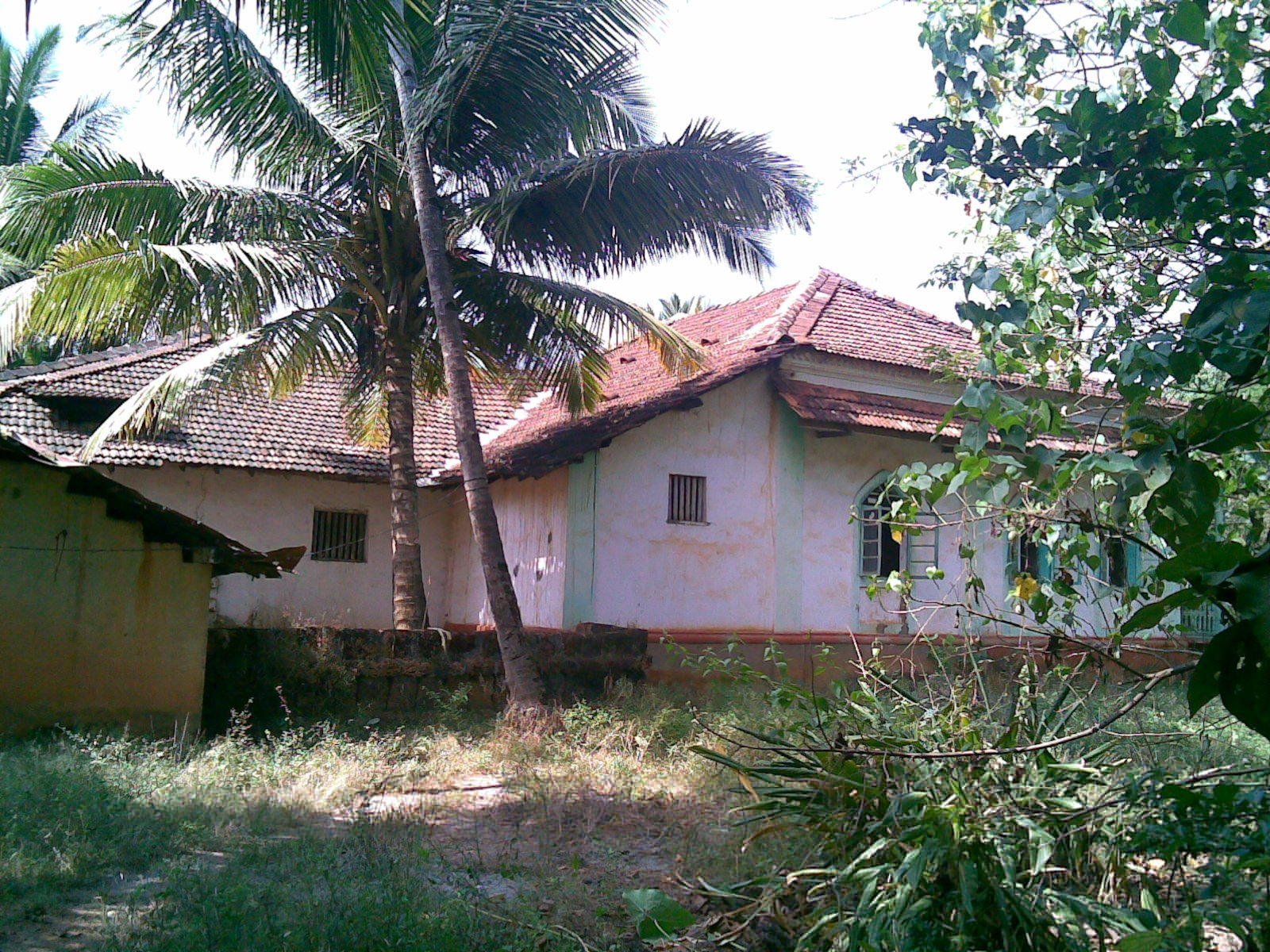
Environs typical of houses in rural Salcete

Salcete taluka comprises nine comunidades: Benaulim, Betalbatim, Colva, Curtorim, Loutolim, Margao, Nuvem, Raia, and Verna.

The sub-district consists of two cities, eleven towns, and thirty-five villages as per the 2011 Census of India.

Salcete Taluka (Census 2011)
#	Settlements	Population
Municipal Councils
1.	Margao	87,650
2.	Cuncolim	16,623
Census Towns
1.	Davorlim	15,350
2.	Curtorim	12,886
3.	Navelim	12,323
4.	Benaulim	11,919
5.	Raia	10,706
6.	São José de Areal	10,229
7.	Nuvem	9,288
8.	Chinchinim	6,908
9.	Verna	6,632
10.	Aquem	6,511
11.	Varca	5,439
Villages
1.	Adsulim	214
2.	Ambelim	2,853
3.	Assolna	3,410
4.	Betalbatim	3,551
5.	Calata	1,739
6.	Camurlim	2,247
7.	Cana	494
8.	Carmona	3,864
9.	Cavelossim	1,955
10.	Cavorim	2,228
11	Chandor	707
12.	Colva	3,141
13.	Deussua	1,479
14.	Dicarpale	3,057
15.	Dramapur	3,441
16.	Duncolim	748
17.	Gandaulim	438
18.	Gonsua	222
19.	Guirdolim	3,622
20.	Loutolim	6,121
21.	Macasana	1,972
22.	Majorda	2,813
23.	Mulem	2,799
24.	Nagoa	3,873
25.	Orlim	2,049
26.	Paroda	620
27.	Rachol	1,686
28.	Sarzora	2,270
29.	Seraulim	3,250
30.	Sernabatim	1,548
31.	Sirlim	845
32.	Talaulim	2,911
33.	Utorda	2,018
34.	Vanelim	1,860
35.	Velim	5,955
Total		2,94,504

== Demographics ==
At the time of the 2011 Census of India, Salcete had a population of 294,464 with sex ratio of 1025 females to 1000 males. Salcete Taluka has an average literacy rate of 89.34%, higher than the national average of 74.04%: male literacy is 92.63% and female literacy is 86.15%. Scheduled Castes and Scheduled Tribes make up 1.17% and 11.06% of the population respectively. 72.15% of the population lives in urban areas.

=== Religion ===
Religion in Salcete Taluka (2011)
Religion	Percent
Christianity	53.57%
Hinduism	34.61%
Islam	11.38%
Other or not stated	0.44%

Christianity is followed by the majority of population of Salcete Taluka, and forms over 75% of the population in rural areas. Hindus form a significant minority. At the time of the 2011 Census of India 53.57% of the population of the Taluka followed Christianity, 34.61% Hinduism, 11.38% Islam and 0.19% of the population followed other religions or did not state religion.

=== Languages ===
Konkani is the most spoken language in Salcete taluka.

Languages of Salcete Taluka (2011)
1. Konkani (71.7%)
2. Hindi (10.5%)
3. Marathi (4.65%)
4. Kannada (3.82%)
5. Urdu (3.20%)
6. Others (incl. Portuguese) (6.08%)

At the time of 2011 Census of India, 71.73% of the population of Salcete Taluka spoke Konkani, 10.52% Hindi, 4.65% Marathi, 3.82% Kannada and 3.20% Urdu as their first language.

== Citations ==
=== References ===
- Kadamb, S. G. (2013). Sources of History of the Kadambas of Goa: Inscriptions (First ed.). Broadway Publishing House. pp. 1–14. ISBN 9789380837314.
- Kosambi, Damodar Dharmanand (1962). Myth and Reality: Studies in the Formation of Indian Culture (reprint ed.). Popular Prakashan. ISBN 9788171548705.
- Rodrigues, L. A. (1990). "The Peninsula of Salcete". In Kusuman, K. K. (ed.). A Panorama of Indian Culture: Professor A. Sreedhara Menon Felicitation Volume. Mittal Publications. pp. 231–246. ISBN 9788170992141.

=== External links ===
- South Goa District : Census 2011 data
