= Mobor =

- town
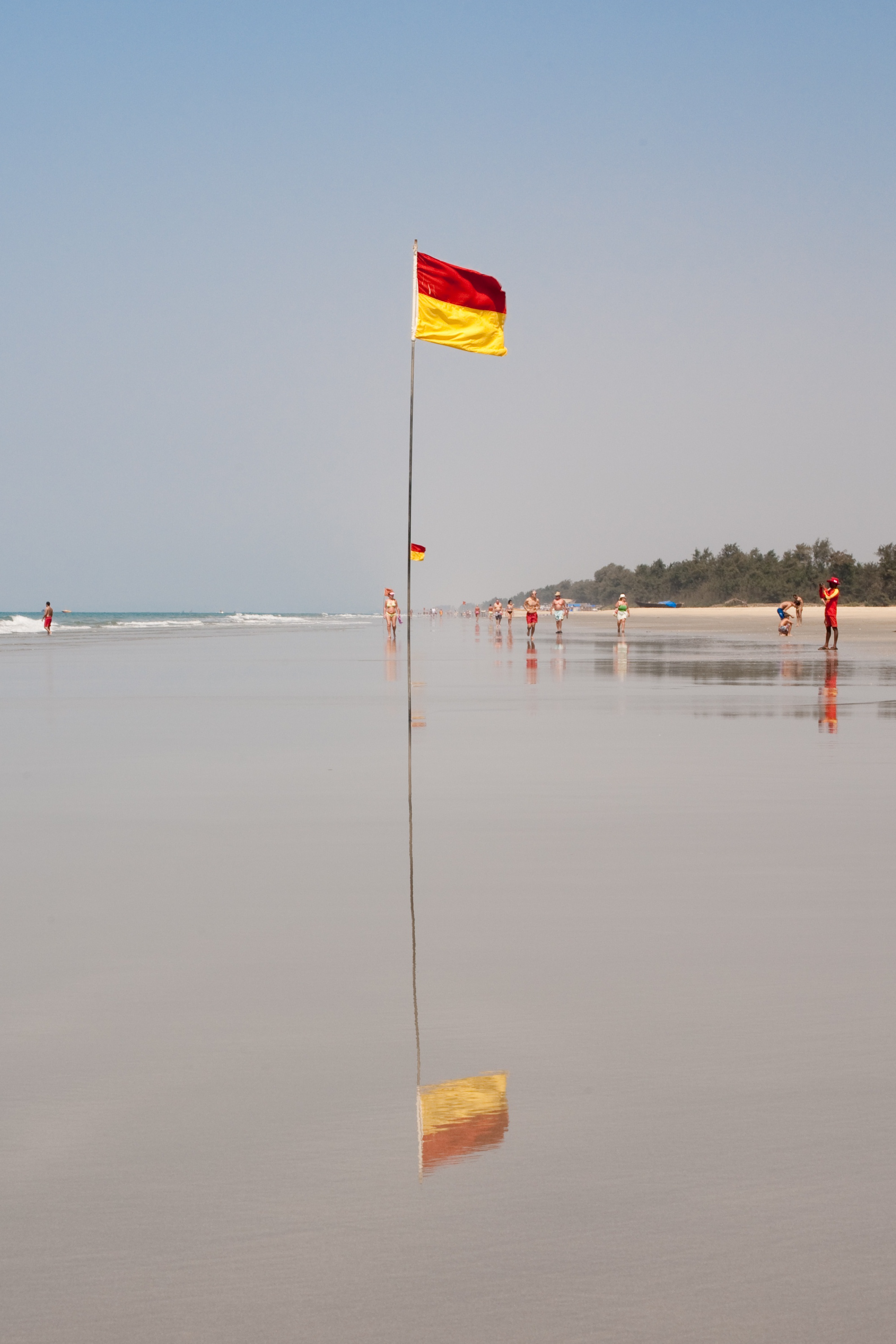

- Location in Goa, India Mobor (India)
- Coordinates: 15.1573°N 73.9463°E
- Country: India
- State: Goa
- District: South Goa
- Elevation: 10 m (33 ft)

Languages
  - Official: Konkani
- Time zone: UTC+5:30 (IST)
- Vehicle registration: GA
- Website: goa.gov.in

Mobor is a town in South Goa in the state of Goa, India.

== Description ==
The town is known for its Mobor Beach.

== See also ==
- South Goa District
