= Varca =

- census town
- Location in Goa, India Varca (India)
- Coordinates: 15.22°N 73.92°E
- Country: India
- State: Goa
- District: South Goa
- Elevation: 0 m (0 ft)

Population (2001)
  - Total: 4,859

Languages
  - Official: Konkani
- Time zone: UTC+5:30 (IST)
- Vehicle registration: GA
- Website: goa.gov.in

Varca is a census town in South Goa district in the Indian state of Goa.

== Geography ==
Varca is located at 15.22°N 73.92°E. It has an average elevation of 0 metres (0 feet).

== Beaches ==
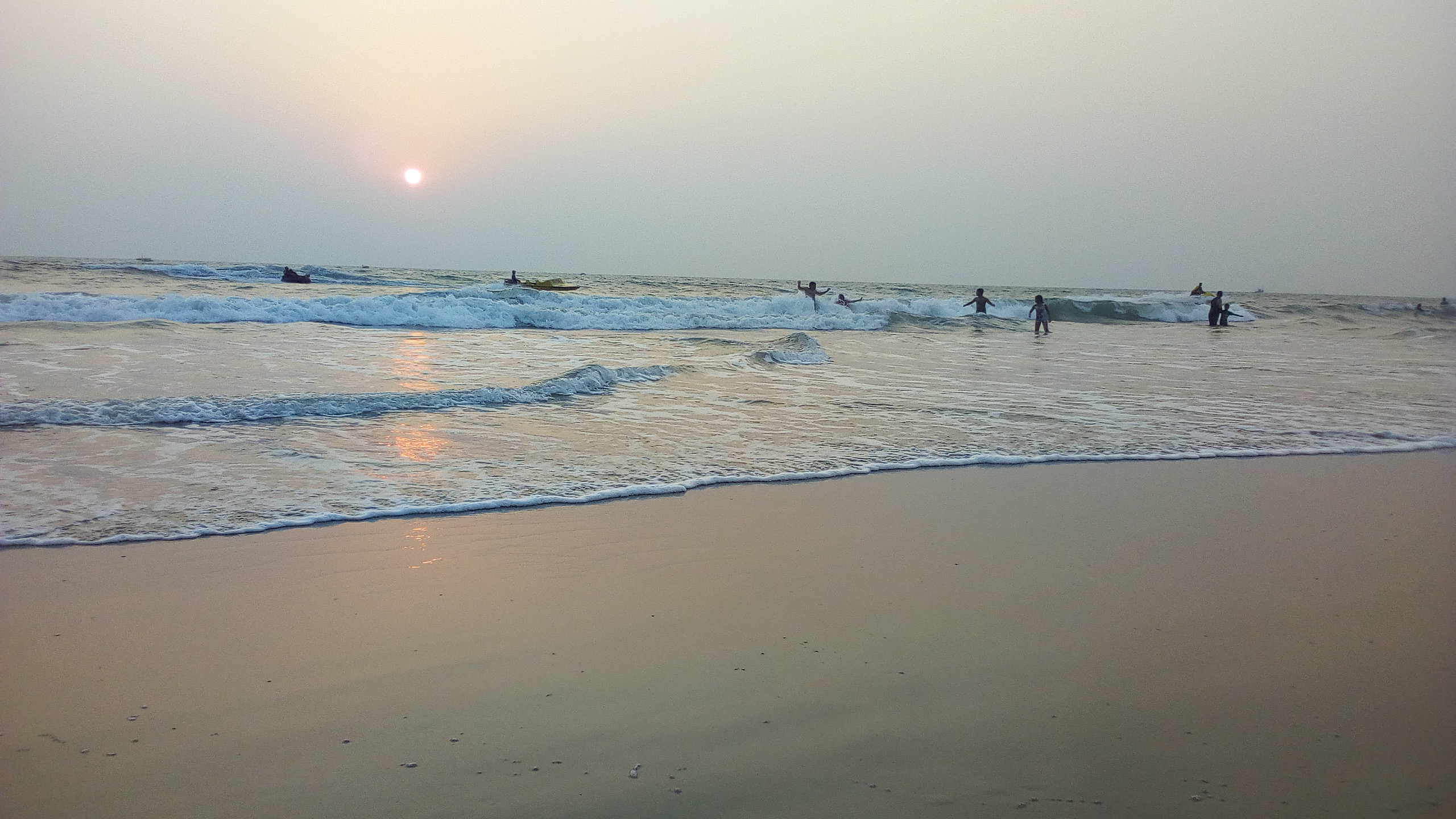
Varca beach

Varca is known for its beaches. The row of wooden fishing boats seen on the beach belongs to the Christian fishing community.

== Demographics ==
As of the 2001 India census, Varca had a population of 4859. Males constitute 47% of the population and females 53%. Varca has an average literacy rate of 77%, higher than the national average of 59.5%: male literacy is 80%, and female literacy is 75%. In Varca, 10% of the population is under 6 years of age. As of today, the population is about 25,000. Most of the males in Varca, take up jobs as seafarers or as NRI (Non Resident Indians) in the Middle East, especially the Gulf States, including Kuwait, UAE and Bahrain. The town mostly comprises Catholics and Hindus.

== Monuments ==
The Our Lady of Gloria church is considered one of the oldest buildings in Varca. It is still operational with locals and tourists attending its services. Beside the church is St Mary's High School, which is managed and run by the church.
