= Dramapur =

- village
- Location in Goa, India Dramapur (India)
- Coordinates: 15.22°N 73.97°E
- Country: India
- State: Goa
- District: South Goa
- Taluka: Salcete
- Elevation: 9 m (30 ft)

Languages
  - Official: Konkani
- Time zone: UTC+5:30 (IST)
- PIN: 403725
- Vehicle registration: GA
- Website: goa.gov.in

Dramapur is a village in the district of South Goa in the Indian coastal state of Goa.

== Geography ==
Dramapur is located at 15.22°N 73.97°E. It has an average elevation of 9 m (30 ft).
