= Roque Santana Fernandes =

Indian politician and activist (1927–2007)

- Portrait of Fernandes

Member of Goa, Daman and Diu Legislative Assembly
- In office 1967 – 5 January 1977
- Preceded by: Sebastiao Mazarelo
- Succeeded by: Ferdino Rebello
- Constituency: Cuncolim
- Majority: 3,774 (43.62%) (Note: for the year 1967–1972; followed by the next term.); 5,337 (58.44%)

Personal details
- Born: Roque Santana Joao Fernandes; 15 March 1927 Velim, Goa, Portuguese India
- Died: 12 January 2007 (aged 79) Brookdale Hospital, Brooklyn, U.S
- Party: Independent (1989–2007)
- Other political affiliations: Goa Pradesh Congress Committee; United Goans (Sequiera Group) (1967–1977); Congress (I); Indian National Congress (1977–1989)
- Spouse: Emerita Barreto
- Children: 4
- Education: St. Anthony's High School
- Occupation: Politician; independence activist
- Known for: Introduction of Goan democracy
- Committees: Freedom Fighter's Rehabilitation Board; Government Assurances; Privileges; Estimates

Roque Santana Joao Fernandes (15 March 1927 – 12 January 2007) was an Indian politician and independence activist who served as a member of the Goa, Daman and Diu Legislative Assembly from 1967 to 1977, representing the Cuncolim Assembly constituency. He is known as the "Father of Goan Democracy" and was responsible for the introduction of democracy by objecting to the Lt. Governor's nomination through his satyagraha. He was one of the prominent people that contributed to Goa liberation movement.

== Early and personal life ==
Roque Santana Fernandes was born on 15 March 1927 in Velim, Goa, which was part of Portuguese India, during the Portuguese Empire (now in India). His father was Avelino Fernandes. He belonged to the Velliapura royal family. He completed his schooling at St. Anthony's High School. Soon after his mother's death at a young age, Fernandes moved to Bombay (present-day Mumbai) and resided in a community apartment known as Koud.

Fernandes was married to Emerita Barreto and had four children, Sanjay, Sahaji, Suhashini and Dr. Sanjit. He and his father were also involved in pilgrimage work and escorted people that came from ghats, to show their affection and respect to the pilgrims in Velim.

== Role in Goa's freedom struggle (1949–1961) ==
=== Early years ===
Fernandes was influenced by his elder cousin, Amarante D'costa, and motivational speeches of Mahatma Gandhi to take part in liberating Goa from the colonial rule. He also held secret meetings along with his father for his plan of action in contributing to Goa's freedom struggle.

Young Fernandes was also responsible along with his associates, one identified as Dattaram Ganesh Kolvenkar, during Portuguese regime to disappear from their watch and cross the borders of Goa-Karnataka to spend time with the pilgrim families and used the same foreign borderline villages as launching grounds for his attacks on the Portuguese.

The year 1949, marked Fernandes's first contribution to Goa's freedom struggle. It was during the Christmas holidays wherein Fernandes was held responsible for the conspiracy to sabotage the reception which was organized for the Portuguese Governor General, Fernando de Quintanilha e Mendonça Dias, at the Indo-Portuguese institute in Dhobitalao, Bombay.

Fernandes and his associates were also caught destroying a large-size photograph of then Prime minister of Portugal, Dr. António de Oliveira Salazar. The Portuguese consul later filed a criminal case against them at the Bombay Metropolitan Magistrate court.

=== Injury ===
Around the 1950s, after serving his sentence, Fernandes and other freedom fighters of the Azad Gomantak Dal were headed in a vehicle to one of the Portuguese police outposts (Note: claimed police outposts based on various sources were either in Betim or Chandrapura (present-day Chandor).) with loaded ammunition to initiate an attack for an attempt to free Salsette Island. The plan was however unsuccessful as the information was leaked to the police personnel by Pro-Portuguese Goans.

As a result of this, Fernandes and his accomplices came under direct crossfire by the Portuguese police. Only two police personnel out of the five survived and were later aided by Dr. Antonio Correia de Lima. Fernandes was shot in his thigh and was critically injured. He was presumably considered dead, the locals also recall of how Fernandes's father, Avelino spat about his family's historical bad luck. However he refused to hold the last rites for his son and had hopes he'd survive.

=== Imprisonment ===
In 1950, Fernandes was arrested for underground pro-liberation activities while having lunch with his associates at Hotel Salcette in Margao. He was then taken to Portuguese military court and was incarcerated for 20 months in Aguada Central Jail.

After his recovery from the injury, Fernandes was sentenced to 18 years in solitary confinement at Aguada Central Jail. He was later released along with other freedom fighters on 19 December 1961, the day Goa liberated from Portuguese reign which was later called as Goa Liberation Day.

=== Intervention of Nehru ===
Soon after the incident at the police outpost, Jawaharlal Nehru intervened and issued a warning to the Portuguese government, which was later carried by newspapers in Goa and Bombay, following this Fernandes survived and was saved by medical treatment. Many local Goans were also attacked by the Portuguese, which lead Jawaharlal Nehru to take action and commence Operation Vijay.

=== Liberation of Goa ===
The liberation from the Portuguese was a "personal victory" to the father-son duo, Avelino and Fernandes. The latter was also welcomed home by his well wishers and family with waving palm leaves. In an interview with the Portuguese national TV in 1987, Fernandes also stated that he had forgiven the Portuguese colonial rulers and proclaimed his reconciliation with the people of Portugal. Post-liberation, Fernandes also worked against Goa's poor equality status, caste system, and corruption.

== Role in Goan democracy (1962–1963) ==
On 17 June 1962, Fernandes made a public announcement at Veliapura (present-day Velim) compound in presence of Gopala Handoo, representative of India Prime Minister Jawaharlal Nehru and his father, Avelino, that he aims to provide democracy to his people.

Fernandes was believed by many locals as a democratic warrior that was recognised as a "one man power" in Goa. He went on a fast until death, demanding that the members of the Goa Parliament be elected by the people and not appointed directly by any other government representative. Soon after his demands were met, Fernandes terminated his hunger strike and engaged in a meeting with Nehru to hold the first Goa, Daman, and Diu elections. He is known as the "Father of Goan Democracy" due to such significant contributions.

Fernandes was an eminent satyagrahi. He was successful in introducing democracy for Goans by objecting then Lt. governor, Kunhiraman Palat Candeth's nomination of 29 members consultative council for the administration of Goa, Daman, and Diu territory, during his three days satyagraha by indefinite hunger strike in Margao. Fernandes coerced Prime Minister of India, Jawaharlal Nehru, to hold the first Goa, Daman and Diu Legislative Assembly elections, which came into existence on 9 December 1963 followed by the convening of the first Goa Legislative Assembly on 9 January 1964.

== Political career ==
After his announcement about democracy to Goans, the locals of Ambelim village approached Fernandes to contest as their representative in the Goa, Daman, and Diu election. He was also the secretary of Goa Pradesh Congress Committee and a significant individual responsible for the formation of the first Congress (I) government in Goa. Fernandes also took part along with other political leaders in the debate about "Goa's merger into neighbouring states, Maharashtra and Mysore or to remain as a separate territory".

Fernandes first contested in the 1967 Goa, Daman and Diu Legislative Assembly election from the Cuncolim Assembly constituency on the United Goans (Sequiera Group) (UGS) ticket and emerged victorious by defeating Maharashtrawadi Gomantak Party (MGP) candidate, K. M. Jaiwant by a margin of 2,054 votes. He then contested in the 1972 Goa, Daman and Diu Legislative Assembly election from the same constituency on the UGS ticket and emerged victorious by defeating MGP candidate, A. J. Guilman Fernandes by a margin of 2,204 votes.

Fernandes next unsuccessfully contested in the 1977 Goa, Daman and Diu Legislative Assembly election from the Cuncolim Assembly constituency on the Indian National Congress (INC) ticket and lost to Janata Party candidate, Ferdino Rebello by a margin of 40 votes. He next contested in the 1989 Goa Legislative Assembly election from the Velim Assembly constituency as an independent candidate and lost to INC candidate, Farrel Furtado by a margin of 8,859 votes.

== Death ==
On 12 January 2007, Fernandes suffered a sudden cardiac arrest at his estate in New York City, after an ice skating trip with his grandson in Manhattan. He was rushed immediately to Brookdale Hospital in Brooklyn, where he was later announced dead by the doctors.

An Indian armed forces gun salute along with a state funeral was initially planned at his native village in Velim, which was later cancelled. His body was cremated at Canarsie in Brooklyn and his mortal remains were flown back to India and laid to rest along with the memorabilia of his royal ancestors at Veliapura royal compound by then Chief Minister of Goa, Digambar Kamat.

=== Mourning ===
On 15 Jan 2007, all 40 legislature of the Goa Legislative Assembly met at a session to observe a state mourning through a motion that was introduced on the floor of the house by then Cabinet Minister, Filipe Nery Rodrigues.

== Awards and felicitation ==
Fernandes was awarded the "Tambra Patra" national award by then Prime Minister of India, Indira Gandhi. In January 2021, he was posthumously felicitated for his contributions towards Goa's freedom struggle along with 9 other freedom fighters at Ravindra Bhavan, Margao by water resources minister, Filipe Nery Rodrigues.

== Aftermath ==
A memorial foundation was founded in his name, and the first recipient of the prestigious crystal "Roque Santana-Father of Goan Democracy award" was presented posthumously to the former Leader of Opposition of Goa and prominent freedom fighter, Jack de Sequeira in 2009, for his contributions in Goa Opinion Poll.

=== 2007 ancient antiques theft ===
In December 2007, a competing group of Haliyal hereditary workers made a visit to the "Velliapura site" in Velim, Goa, which is associated with Fernandes. During their visit, they forcibly dismantled the marble tabernacle and urns, taking away all the items within. The group was identified as pilgrim groups which originally were affiliated to the four groups of Uttarkhand that were Gonds, Halakis, Havyak and Siddis and had no fear of law enforcement. This was brought to the notice of Emerita, who furiously ordered the group to leave the urns alone and take away the rest. Ancient foot-long, Kannada stone inscriptions and other antiques which were part of the worship places were stolen by the group. The following month, they were caught and charged for the theft and robbery of ancient antiques that went missing.

== Legacy ==
In December 2010, a memorial children's park, which included a bust of Fernandes, was initially planned by the family to be set up in the Ambelim village which was later denied permission by the Ambelim gram sabha due to "conflicting views" among the members during the meeting.

In July 2011, the panchayat unanimously accepted the proposal of the family members to construct the memorial park but without the bust. The construction costs were paid by the family and the land and maintenance were provided by the panchayat. The construction was planned to begin in September and completed by December.

== Positions held ==
- Member of the Physical Education Board
- Committee member of the Freedom Fighter's Rehabilitation Board 1962–64
- Member of the Committee on Government Assurances 1967–68 (resigned in September 1967) and 1971–72
- Member of the Committee on Petitions 1970–71
- Member of the Committee on Privileges 1970–71
- Member of Estimates Committee 1971–72
