= Clafasio Dias =

Indian politician

Member of Goa Legislative Assembly
- In office 2017–2022
- Preceded by: Subhash Rajan Naik
- Succeeded by: Yuri Alemao
- Constituency: Cuncolim

Personal details
- Party: Bhartiya Janta party (2019–2022)
- Other political affiliations: Indian National Congress (2017–2019)

Clafasio Dias is an Indian politician and former member of the Goa Legislative Assembly. He represented the Cuncolim Assembly constituency. Dias won by defeating sitting MLA Subhash Rajan Naik of the Bharatiya Janata party and former Independent MLA Joaquim Alemao. He was also a zilla panchayat member, sarpanch and Chairperson of South Goa Zilla Panchayat.

He was one of the ten members of Indian National Congress who joined Bharatiya Janata Party in July 2019.
