= Subhash Rajan Naik =

Indian politician

Member of Goa Legislative Assembly
- In office 2012–2017
- Preceded by: Joaquim Alemao
- Succeeded by: Clafasio Dias
- Constituency: Cuncolim

Personal details
- Born: Cuncolim, Goa, India
- Political party: Bharatiya Janata Party
- Occupation: Politician; businessman

Subhash alias Rajan Kashinath Naik is an Indian politician and businessman. He is a former member of the Goa Legislative Assembly. Naik is also a former football player, excelling as a defender for his village team. Prior to his successful stint as the MLA of the Cuncolim Assembly constituency, he served as a two-time Cuncolim Municipal councilor.

Naik's family has been ardent football fans and has been actively supporting football in Cuncolim. During his term as a legislator, Naik made serious efforts to identify and help the government acquire the land for the NIT-Goa. He is credited with his dedicated efforts towards making the NIT-Goa campus a reality in Cuncolim.

== Committees in the Goa Legislative Assembly ==
Naik was a member of the following committees in the house in the Sixth Legislative Assembly 2012.

- Member Committee on Public Undertakings
- Member Committee on Delegated Legislation
- Member Committee on Government Assurances
- Member Select Committee on The Goa School Education
