= Ferdino Rebello =

Indian politician and lawyer (born 1949)

Member of the Goa, Daman and Diu Legislative Assembly
- In office 1977–1980
- Preceded by: Roque Santana Fernandes
- Succeeded by: Jose Mario Vaz
- Constituency: Cuncolim

Personal details
- Born: 31 August 1949 (age 77) Cuncolim, Goa, Portuguese India
- Party: Janata Dal (1989)
- Other political affiliations: Janata Party (1977–1989)
- Education: Government Law College, Mumbai (LL.B)

Ferdino Inacio Rebello (born 31 August 1949) is a retired Indian jurist, social activist, and former politician who served as the Chief Justice of the Allahabad High Court from 26 June 2010 to 30 July 2011. Previously he served as a judge of the Bombay High Court from 1996 to 2010. Rebello is a former member of the Goa, Daman and Diu Legislative Assembly, representing the Cuncolim constituency from 1977 to 1980.

== Early life ==
Ferdino Inacio Rebello was born on 31 August 1949 in Cuncolim, Portuguese Goa.

Rebello completed his LL.B. from the Government Law College, Mumbai and thereafter practiced in the High Court of Bombay at Goa. He also was a lecturer in law at the Mahadevrao Salgaocar College of Law from 1975 to 1977.

== Career ==
Rebello was the president of Goa High Court Bar Association from 1984 to 1996 and was designated a Senior Advocate in 1995. He was elected to the Legislative Assembly of Goa in 1977 on a Janata Party ticket. In 1989, he unsuccessfully contested and lost parliamentary elections on a Janata Dal ticket to Eduardo Falerio and has been inactive in politics ever since.

In 2026, Rebello led a citizen's movement called "Enough is Enough", hosting large public meetings and protests across Goa over issues like land conversion.
