= GPCC =

GPCC can refer to:

- Goa Pradesh Congress Committee, of the Indian National Congress
- Gujarat Pradesh Congress Committee, of the Indian National Congress
- Global Precipitation Climatology Centre, a global meteorological data centre hosted at Deutscher Wetterdienst
