= Manu Fernandes =

Indian politician and businessman (born 1944)

Member of Goa Legislative Assembly
- In office 1984–1994
- Preceded by: Jose Vaz
- Succeeded by: Arecio D'Souza
- Constituency: Cuncolim
- Majority: 5,535 (43.94%) (Note: for the year 1984–1989; followed by the next term.); 4,243 (33.10%)
- In office 1994–1999
- Preceded by: Farrel Furtado
- Succeeded by: Filipe Nery Rodrigues
- Constituency: Velim
- Majority: 5,409 (46.66%)

Personal details
- Born: Manuel Gregorio Fernandes; 11 September 1944 (age 82) Betul, Goa, Portuguese India
- Spouse: Alcina Fernandes
- Education: Segundo Año do Liceu
- Occupation: Politician; businessman

Manuel Gregorio "Manu" Fernandes (born 11 September 1944) is an Indian former politician and businessman who served as a member of the Goa Legislative Assembly, representing the Cuncolim Assembly constituency from 1984 to 1994 and Velim Assembly constituency from 1994 to 1999.

== Early and personal life ==
Fernandes was born in Betul, Goa, which was part of Portuguese India. He completed his (Portuguese: Segundo Ano do Liceu or 10th grade). He is married to Alcina Fernandes and resides at Margao, Goa.

== Positions held ==
- Former Chairman of Goa Industrial Development Corporation (G.I.D.C)
- Executive Committee Member of Goa Pradesh Congress Committee (G.P.C.C.)
- Committee Member on Petitions 1990-91
- Estimates Committee Member 1991-92, 1992–93, 1993–94
- Petitions Committee Chairman 1992-93
- Library Committee Member 1991-92
- Public Accounts Committee Member 1991-92, 1992–93, 1993–94
- Government Assurances Committee Member 1992-93, 1993–94
- Committee Member on Public Undertakings 1992-93
- Committee Chairman on Petitions 1993-94
- Estimates Committee Chairman 1995-96
- Presently, Chairman of Khadi and Village Industries Board
