= Savio Rodrigues =

Indian journalist and politician (born 1976)

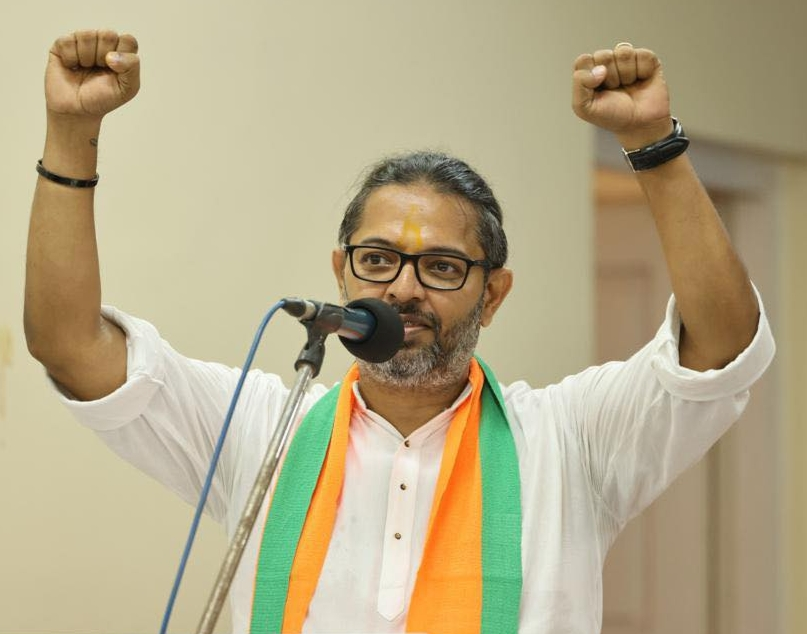
- Rodrigues in 2024
- Born: Savio Oliver Ignatius Rodrigues; 31 July 1976 (age 50); Bombay, Maharashtra, India
- Education: Government Law College (BA LL.B)
- Occupations: Journalist; writer; entrepreneur; politician
- Years active: 1996–present
- Title: Founder and editor-in-chief of Goa Chronicle and Incubees; Founder, MD and CEO of Kaydence Media Ventures and Kianna Media Ventures
- Political party: Bhartiya Janata Party (since 2022)
- Other political affiliations: Goa Su-Raj Party (2014–2014); Independent (2014–2016); Indian National Congress (2016–2017); Independent (2017–2021)
- Spouse: Myrtle Rodrigues (m. 2004)
- Children: 2
- Writing career
- Language: English
- Period: 2015–present
- Subjects: Narendra Modi; Jesus Christ
- Website: saviorodrigues.com

Savio Oliver Ignatius Rodrigues (born 31 July 1976) is an Indian investigative journalist, writer, entrepreneur, and politician based in Velim, Goa. He is the founder and editor-in-chief of Goa Chronicle, a news portal. Rodrigues is a leader of the Bharatiya Janata Party and a former spokesperson for the party.

== Early life ==
Savio Oliver Ignatius Rodrigues was born on 31 July 1976 in Bombay, India, to Ignatius Rosario Rodrigues. He completed the first year of a Bachelor of Arts Bachelor of Laws (B.A LL.B) at the Government Law College, Mumbai, in 2000. He spent most of his younger years studying and living in Dubai, UAE.

== Career ==
Rodrigues began his career at the age of 20 in the fields of journalism, communications and entrepreneurship. During his early years he built his career in media, environmental sciences and technology in India. His business ventures include Goa Chronicle, Kaydence Media Ventures, Incubees, and Kianna Media Ventures. During its early years, Goa Chronicle, now owned by Kaydence Media Ventures and a part of ITV Network Group found itself struggling in the state of Goa. Rodrigues was also a television host of the TV show, The Goa Chronicle Show (2021) which aired on NewsX. He was also a columnist for The Indian Express and a panelist on television and web shows hosted in India and globally.

=== Politics (2014–present) ===
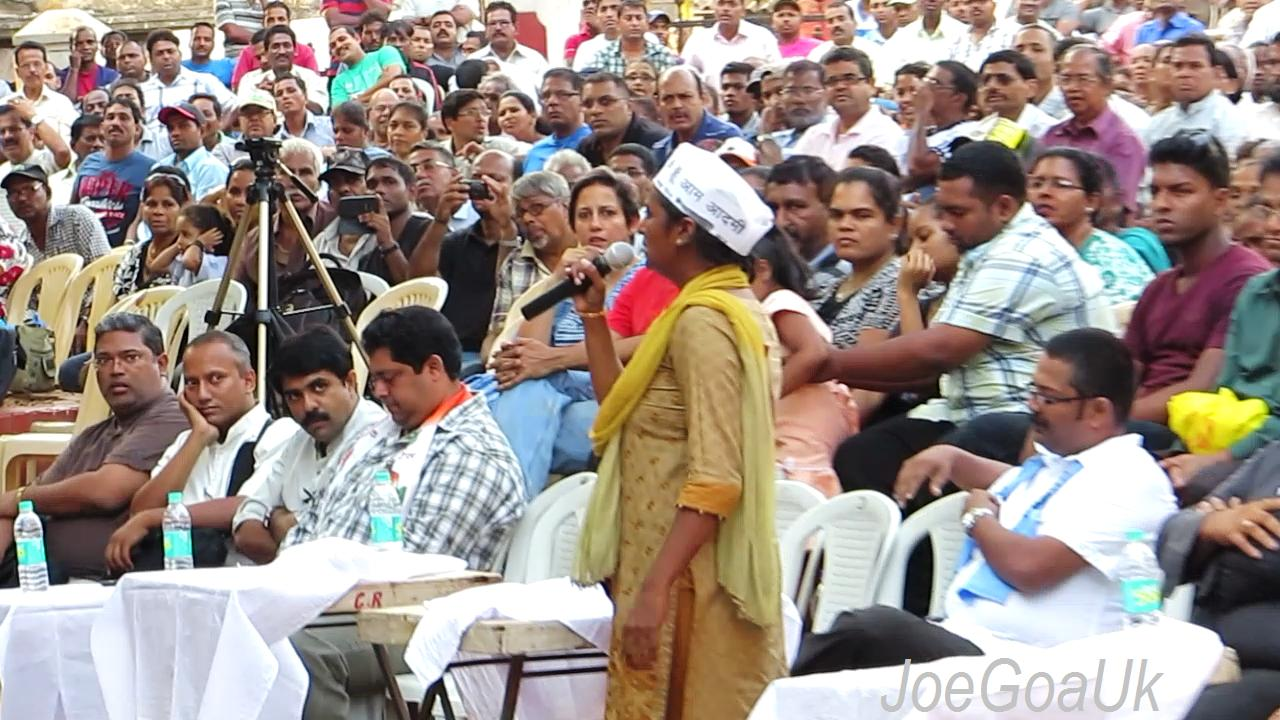
Rodrigues (extreme right) at a public meeting held at Margao in 2014.

Rodrigues joined Goa Su-Raj Party and was appointed as a party secretary and the youth affairs president. He then unsuccessfully contested the 2014 Indian general election from the South Goa constituency, securing ninth place with 783 votes. Rodrigues later joined the Indian National Congress around 2016, where he served as a senior leader and vice-chairman of the Goa Congress minority cell. He resigned from the party on 17 March 2017.

On 4 January 2022, Rodrigues joined the Bhartiya Janata Party in the presence of Goa unit president, Sadanand Tanavade. He then unsuccessfully contested in the 2022 Goa Legislative Assembly election from the Velim Assembly constituency and lost to AAP candidate, Cruz Silva with a margin of 4,059 votes, securing the sixth place.

== Personal life ==
Rodrigues is married to Myrtle. The couple has two daughters, Kaydence and Kianna. He currently resides at Baga, Velim. Rodrigues practices Christian faith but claims to have "Hindu roots."

== Legal issues ==
On 14 April 2011, Rodrigues filed a petition in the Bombay High Court at Panjim, seeking a ban on the release of the 2011 Hindi-language movie, Dum Maaro Dum, claiming that it showed the state of Goa in bad light. He also objected to the constitution of a seven member committee to examine the movie before its released in theatres. On 19 April, the court dismissed Rodrigues's petition, allowing the film to be released.

A 2024 article by The Washington Post alleged that Rodrigues was a part of an Indian operation to overthrow Mohamed Muizzu, the President of Maldives.

== Bibliography ==
- Rodrigues, Savio (21 July 2015). Karmic Ishq. Margao, Goa, India: Cinnamon Teal Print And Publishing Services. ISBN 9789385523038.
- Bagaria, Amit; Rodrigues, Savio (4 June 2021). Modi Stole My Mask: The Truth about India's COVID Crisis. Gurgaon, Haryana, India: Garuda Prakashan Private Limited. ISBN 9781942426554.
- Rodrigues, Savio (10 May 2024). The Path to Peace: Conflict Avoidance the Jesus Way. Velim, Goa, India: Kianna Publishers. ASIN B0D3XZ3BHB.
