= Arecio D'Souza =

Indian politician and businessman (born 1949)

Member of Goa Legislative Assembly
- In office 1994–2002
- Preceded by: Manu Fernandes
- Succeeded by: Joaquim Alemao
- Constituency: Cuncolim
- Majority: 5,294 (39.71%)

Personal details
- Born: Arecio Agapito D'Souza; 7 September 1949 (age 77) Cuncolim, Goa, Portuguese India, Portuguese Empire
- Party: Indian National Congress (1998–2002)
- Other political affiliations: United Goans Democratic Party (1994–1998)
- Spouse: Sunita D'Souza
- Occupation: Politician; businessman

Arecio Agapito D'Souza (born 7 September 1949) is an Indian politician and businessman who is a former member of the Goa Legislative Assembly, representing the Cuncolim Assembly constituency from 1994 to 2002.

== Early and personal life ==
Arecio Agapito D'Souza was born on 7 September 1949 in Cuncolim, Goa, Portuguese India during the Portuguese Empire (now in India). He completed his M.A.B and is married to Sunita Dsouza. He currently resides at Cuncolim.

== Career ==
In July 1998, D'Souza left United Goans Democratic Party to join Indian National Congress.

== Positions held ==
- Former chairman of the board of Goa State Pollution Control Board (1999–2002)
