= Ambelim =

Ambelim Ambelle
- Village
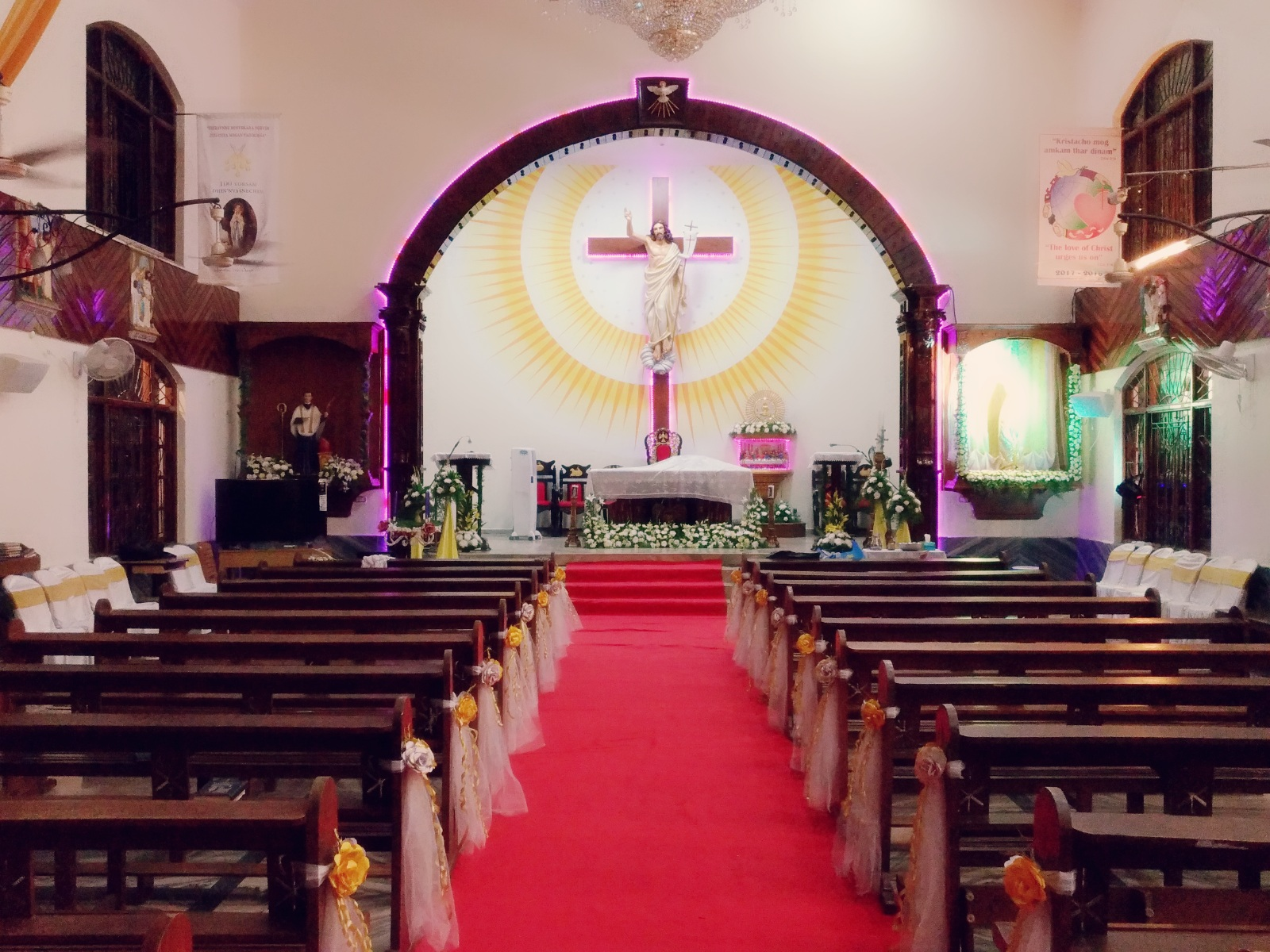
- Interior of Our Lady Of Lourdes Chapel, Ambelim

- Location in Goa, India Ambelim (India)
- Coordinates: 15°10′17.9″N 73°58′06.9″E
- Country: India
- State: Goa
- District: South Goa
- Sub-district: Salcete

Government
  - Type: Gram Panchayat
  - Body: Village Panchayat
  - Member of the Goa Legislative Assembly: Cruz Silva (AAP)
  - Sarpanch: Celia Torcato
  - Deputy Sarpanch: Valency Carvalho

Area
  - Total: 3.89 km^{2} (1.50 sq mi)

Population (2013)
  - Total: 3,500
  - Density: 900/km^{2} (2,300/sq mi)
- Demonym: Ambelkar

Languages
  - Official: Konkani; English
  - Additional/Cultural: Romi Konkani; Portuguese
- Time zone: UTC+5:30 (IST)
- PIN: 403723
- Area code: 0832
- Vehicle registration: GA
- Website: www.vpambelim.in

Ambelim (Konkani: Ambelle) is a large village that's located within the Salcete taluka and falls under the South Goa district. It shares its border with Velim and Assolna villages. The village has a predominant population from the fishing and scheduled tribe communities and has a population of about 3500 residents in seven wards.

== Government and politics ==
Ambelim comes under the Velim Assembly constituency and is home to the Velim MLA, Cruz Silva.

== Notable people ==
- Benjamin Silva (former MLA of Velim Assembly constituency)
- Cruz Silva (current MLA of Velim Assembly constituency)

== See also ==
- Salcete territory
