= Jose Vaz =

Indian politician and freedom fighter (1938–2002)

Member of Goa Legislative Assembly
- In office 1980–1984
- Preceded by: Ferdino Rebello
- Succeeded by: Manu Fernandes
- Constituency: Cuncolim
- Majority: 7,328 (67.54%)

Personal details
- Born: Jose Mario Emerciane Vaz; 19 March 1938 Cuncolim, Goa, Portuguese India
- Died: 31 July 2002 (aged 64) Goa, India
- Party: Congress (I) (1980–1984)
- Spouse: Pulcheria Vaz
- Education: St. Stanislaus High School (S.S.C); St. Xavier’s College, Bombay (B.A.); Dhempe College, Panaji (D.Ed)
- Occupation: Politician; freedom fighter
- Profession: Headmaster
- Committees: Library; Headmasters Association

Mario Vaz (19 March 1938 – 31 July 2002) was an Indian politician and freedom fighter who was a former member of the Goa Legislative Assembly, representing the Cuncolim Assembly constituency from 1980 to 1984. Vaz also contributed in the Goa Liberation Movement.

== Early and personal life ==
Jose Mario Emerciane Vaz was born on 19 March 1938 in Cuncolim, Goa, which was part of Portuguese India during the Portuguese Empire (now located in India). He completed his Secondary School Certificate from St. Stanislaus High School. He later did his graduation in Bachelor of Arts from St. Xavier's College, Bombay (now Mumbai). Vaz was also an alumnus of Dhempe College, Panaji. Vaz was married to Pulcheria Vaz and resided at Nanguillo, Cuncolim until his death in 2002.

== Career ==
=== Politics ===
He contested against his own cousin brother stalwart of maharastrawadi gomantak party (MGP) afronio Vaz(afrank).Prior to winning the seat in the Goa Legislative Assembly, Vaz was a Sarpanch of Cuncolim Village panchayat from 1968 to 1972. He contested in the Goa, Daman and Diu Legislative Assembly election on the Congress ticket and emerged victorious.

=== Teaching ===
Vaz was also a headmaster of Our Lady of Health High School, Cuncolim from 1964 to 1979 and St. Xavier's High School.

== Role in Goa's freedom struggle ==
Vaz was a member of the Azad Gomantak Dal. He was also a joint secretary of the "Goan Students Association Bombay". In 1956, under his leadership, Vaz held an assembly at Bombay for the immediate withdrawal of the Portuguese colonial rulers in Goa. Following this event, the Portuguese government blacklisted Vaz and was banned entry in Goa till Goa Liberation Day.

== Positions held ==
- Member of Library Committee 1980–81
- Member of the committee to solve the dispute between Ramponcars and Mechanized Boat Operators
- Member of the Select Committee on Bill No. 27 of The Goa, Daman and Diu Education Bill 1980
- Ex-President of Cuncolim Union, Goa
- Executive Committee member of the Headmasters Association.
