= Girish Chodankar =

Indian politician and teacher

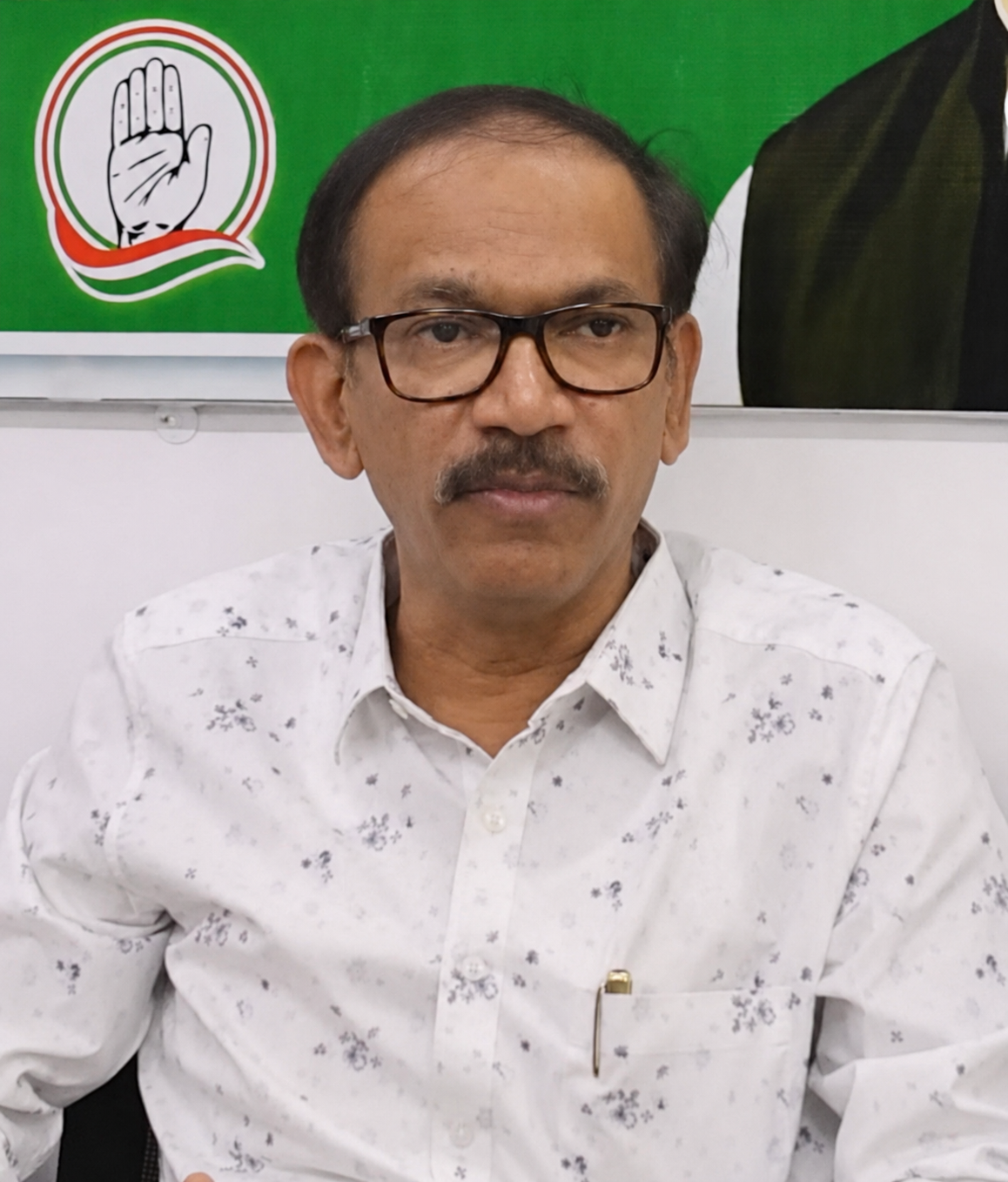
- Chodankar at PPCC headquarters, 2026

AICC in-charge of Tamil Nadu CC and Puducherry PCC
- In office 14 February 2025 – 8 July 2026
- Preceded by: Ajoy Kumar
- Succeeded by: Ghulam Ahmad Mir

AICC in-charge of Tripura PCC, Sikkim PCC, Manipur PCC, and Nagaland PCC
- In office 23 December 2023 – 14 February 2025
- Preceded by: Ajoy Kumar
- Succeeded by: Saptagiri Sankar Ulaka

President of Goa Pradesh Congress Committee
- Incumbent
- Assumed office 29 May 2026
- Preceded by: Amit Patkar
- In office 26 April 2018 – 15 March 2022
- Preceded by: Shantaram Naik
- Succeeded by: Amit Patkar

Personal details
- Born: Girish Raya Chodankar; 25 July 1966 or 1967 (age 59–60)
- Party: Indian National Congress (since 1989)
- Spouse: Sunita Chodankar (m. 1998)
- Education: Annamalai University (B.Ed); Goa University (M.Com)
- Occupation: Politician; teacher
- Website: facebook.com/GirishChodankarGoa
- Girish Chodankar's voice Chodankar in response to three MLA's joining the Indian National Congress party. Recorded 8 November 2021

Girish Raya Chodankar (born 25 July 1966 or 1967) is an Indian politician and former teacher who has served as president of the Goa Pradesh Congress Committee (GPCC) since July 2026. He previously served as the All India Congress Committee (AICC) in-charge of the Tamil Nadu CC and the Puducherry PCC from 2025 to 2026. A former AICC secretary, Chodankar was appointed a permanent invitee to the Congress Working Committee (CWC) in 2023.

== Early life ==
Girish Raya Chodankar was born on either 25 July 1966 or 1967 to Raya Chodankar, into a Bhandari family. He obtained his Master of Commerce (M.Com.) degree with a specialization in Business Management from Goa University in 1990. Subsequently, in 1993, he completed his Bachelor of Education (B.Ed.) degree with a focus on Commerce I & ii from Annamalai University in Tamil Nadu.

== Political career ==
Chodankar began his political career with the Indian National Congress (INC) in 1989, later assuming the role of booth president for the Comba, Goa booth in Fatorda. He subsequently rose through the ranks of the party, holding positions such as general secretary and president of the Fatorda Block Youth Congress Committee. In 2018, Chodankar's contributions were recognized when he was appointed as the president of the Goa Pradesh Congress Committee (GPCC). In 1995, he successfully contested the Margao Municipal Council election and secured a seat representing the Comba ward. In 1998, he assumed the position of general secretary of the Goa Pradesh Youth Congress Committee (GPYCC).

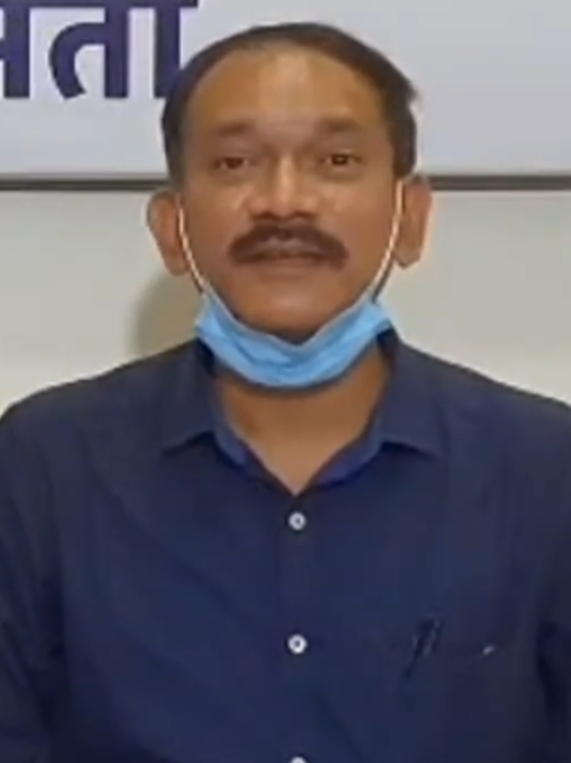
Chodankar at GPCC headquarters, 2021

Chodankar served as the president of the Goa Pradesh Youth Congress Committee from 2000 to 2008, further solidifying his involvement to the party's youth wing. Before being appointed to the highest decision-making body of the Congress party, Chodankar held the position of a secretary in the All India Congress Committee (AICC). He assumed this role in June 2013 and worked closely with the office of Rahul Gandhi, a prominent leader within the party. Prior to his tenure as AICC secretary, Chodankar was stationed at the AICC secretariat in New Delhi from 2011 onwards. Chodankar's responsibilities extended to his position as the AICC in-charge of the National Students' Union of India (NSUI). During his tenure, he played a pivotal role in establishing and strengthening student bases in various states, notably achieving success in student council elections at Delhi University.

In May 2017, Chodankar was selected to be a part of the AICC committee established by Rahul Gandhi. The committee's purpose was to choose the president of NSUI using an open application process.

Chodankar served as the chief of the Goa Pradesh Youth Congress Committee (GPYCC), where he played a pivotal role in mobilizing the support of young individuals to strengthen the party's foundation at the grassroots level and facilitate the reconstruction of the party organization. Throughout the period of the Bharatiya Janata Party's (BJP) governance in Goa from 2000 to 2005, Chodankar actively engaged with the government on various matters, even in instances where senior party leaders refrained from confronting the then Chief Minister of Goa, Manohar Parrikar.

Chodankar has participated in multiple elections as a candidate representing the Indian National Congress. In the 2002 Goa Legislative Assembly election, Chodankar contested from the Margao Assembly constituency; however, he was unsuccessful in securing victory, as he was defeated by the BJP candidate, Digambar Kamat, with a margin of 4,744 votes, consequently placing second. Similarly, during the 2017 by-election for the Panaji Assembly constituency, Chodankar faced defeat against the BJP candidate, Manohar Parrikar, with a margin of 4,803 votes, thereby finishing in the second position. Furthermore, Chodankar also participated in the 2019 Indian general election in Goa, vying for the North Goa Lok Sabha constituency. In this election, he faced defeat against the BJP candidate, Shripad Naik, with a substantial margin of 80,247 votes, ultimately securing the second position.

Following his defeat in the 2017 by-election against Manohar Parrikar, the Chief Minister of Goa at the time, Chodankar characterized the outcome as a dignified conclusion to a formidable struggle. He expressed pride in being selected as a candidate by his party and embracing the challenge of competing against a serving chief minister, as well as contending with the resources and support of the government and the Bharatiya Janata Party (BJP). Chodankar considered his fight to be honorable due to the Congress party's commitment to democratic values by actively engaging in the electoral process.

As of April 2018, Chodankar was employed as a teacher at a higher secondary school in Curchorem. In preparation for his election campaign in 2019, Chodankar announced his intention to highlight the deficiencies of Shripad Naik, a four-time Member of Parliament and the Union Minister of Ayurveda, Yoga & Naturopathy, Unani, Siddha, and Homoeopathy (AYUSH). During his campaign, he initiated a bicycle journey through different districts in North Goa as part of his strategic efforts to connect with voters in the region.

Chodanker was re-appointed as Goa Congress chief on 29 May 2026.

== Personal life ==
On 15 November 1998, Chodankar married Sunita, a private insurance agent. As of December 2023, he resides in the Gogol suburb of Margao.

On 10 February 2021, Chodankar's father, Raya, aged 82, died to COVID-19 at the Goa Medical College in Bambolim.
