= James Mazarelo =

English field hockey player (born 2001)

Personal information
- Born: 4 February 2001 (age 25) Manchester, England

Sport
- Sport: Field hockey
- Position: Goalkeeper
Senior career
| Years | Team | Caps | Goals |
| 2016–2019 | Bowdon | - | - |
| 2019–2022 | Loughborough Students | - | - |
| 2024–2025 | UP Rudras | - | - |
| 2022–2025 | Surbiton | - | - |
| 2025–2026 | Old Georgians | - | - |
National team
| Years | Team | Caps | Goals |
| 2018–2019 | England & GB U21 | 10 | - |
| 2022-present | England | 7 | - |
| 2022-present | GB | 13 | - |
Medal record
Men's field hockey
Representing England
EuroHockey Championship
| Silver medal – second place | 2023 Mönchengladbach |
Commonwealth Games
| Bronze medal – third place | 2022 Birmingham | Team |
EuroHockey Junior Championship
| Silver medal – second place | 2019 Valencia |

James Mazarelo (born 4 February 2001) is an English field hockey player who plays as a goalkeeper for Old Georgians Hockey Club in the Men's England Hockey League.

== Early life ==
Mazarelo was born on 4 February 2001 in Manchester, England and is of Goan descent. His great-uncle, Sebastião Mazarelo, served as one of the first members in the Goa, Daman and Diu Legislative Assembly. He was educated at Altrincham Grammar School for Boys, where he was head boy.

== Career ==
Mazarelo started playing for Bowdon and represented England U-16s, U-18s and U-21s and GB U-21s. He then played club hockey in the Men's England Hockey League for Loughborough Students for three years before moving on to Surbiton in 2022. Mazarelo won a bronze medal with England in the Men's tournament at the 2022 Commonwealth Games in Birmingham and won a silver medal with England at the 2023 Men's EuroHockey Championship in Mönchengladbach.

Mazarelo was part of the Surbiton team that won the league title during the 2024–25 Men's England Hockey League season. He joined Old Georgians for the 2025–26 season and won the Premier League title with them.
