= Sebastião Mazarelo =

Indian politician and medical practitioner

- Official portrait in 1963

Member of Goa, Daman and Diu Legislative Assembly
- In office 1963–1967
- Preceded by: Constituency established
- Succeeded by: Roque Santana Fernandes
- Constituency: Cuncolim

Personal details
- Born: Velim, Goa, Portuguese India
- Died: Unknown
- Party: United Goans Party (1963–1967)
- Children: 1 (deceased)
- Relatives: James Mazarelo (great-nephew)
- Education: Bachelor of Medicine, Bachelor of Surgery
- Occupation: Politician
- Profession: Medical practitioner

Sebastião Mazarelo was an Indian politician and medical practitioner. He was the first member of the Goa, Daman and Diu Legislative Assembly from the Cuncolim Assembly constituency. He served for five years, from 1963 to 1967. He was also one of the notable individuals that played a pivotal role in the Goa Opinion Poll.

== Early and personal life ==
Sebastiao Mazarelo was born at Goreamorod, Velim in Portuguese Goa. He had a son, Wilson Benigno Duarte Mazarello, a former footballer and medical practitioner, who played for Associacao Academica de Goa.
