= Farrel Furtado =

Indian politician and teacher (born 1961)

Member of Goa Legislative Assembly
- In office 1989–1994
- Preceded by: Constituency established
- Succeeded by: Manu Fernandes
- Constituency: Velim
- Majority: 8,962 (78.54%)

Personal details
- Born: Farrel Benito Furtado; 1 November 1961 (age 65) East Africa
- Party: Trinamool Congress (2021–present)
- Other political affiliations: Indian National Congress (1989–1994); Goa Forward Party (2017–2021)
- Spouse: Elvis Gracias
- Children: 1
- Occupation: Politician
- Profession: Teacher
- Awards: International Youth Award (1980)

Farrel Benito Furtado E Gracias (née Furtado; born 1 November 1961) is an Indian teacher and former politician who served as a member of the Goa Legislative Assembly, representing the Velim Assembly constituency from 1989 to 1994. She is the first and only woman legislator to be elected from the Velim constituency.

== Early and personal life ==
Farrel Benito Furtado was born in East Africa, she completed her studies in Bachelor of Arts, Bachelor of Education, Master of Arts and Bachelor of Laws. She is married to Elvis Gracias and has a son. She resides at Cuncolim, Goa.

== Career ==
=== Politics ===
Furtado was elected for the term 1989 to 1994. She had contested the 1989 Goa Legislative Assembly election on the Indian National Congress ticket and won against Janata Dal candidate, Minguel Gabriel Rodrigues by a margin of 6706 votes.

In November 2017, Furtado along with Victor Gonsalves joined Goa Forward Party. In 2021, she joined All India Trinamool Congress.

=== Sports ===
Furtado is a former national level field hockey player and captained the Goa hockey team at the nationals. She played an integral role in resuscitating the state women's hockey association and currently serves as the senior vice president at the Goans Hockey Association. She is also a former chairman of the Sarva Shiksha Abhiyan. Furtado was also awarded the International Youth award at Tokyo in the year 1980.

=== Teaching ===
Furtado currently is a senior teacher at Maria Bambina Convent High School, Cuncolim.

== Accolades ==
On 9 January 2014 at the golden jubilee of the Goa State Assembly, Furtado was felicitated along with eight other Goan women legislators.
