= Cruz Silva =

Indian politician (born 1969)

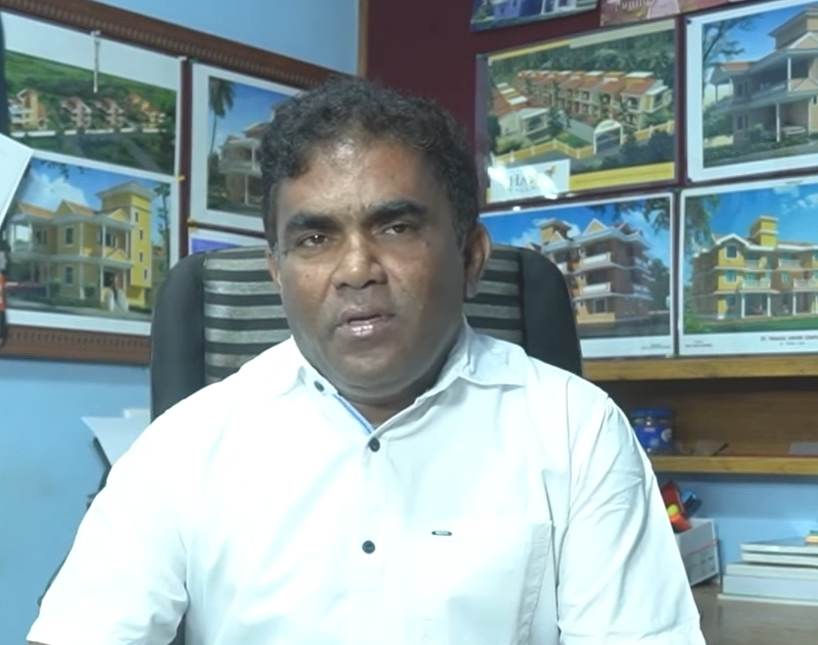
- Silva at his office in 2022

Member of the Goa Legislative Assembly
- Incumbent
- Assumed office 10 March 2022
- Preceded by: Filipe Nery Rodrigues
- Constituency: Velim

AAP Working President
- Incumbent
- Assumed office 24 May 2022

Personal details
- Born: 28 December 1969 (age 56) Goa, India
- Party: Aam Aadmi Party (2017—present)
- Education: Goa Engineering College (BE)
- Occupation: Politician
- Profession: Civil engineer

Cruz Silva (born 28 December 1969) is an Indian civil engineer and politician who serves as a member of the Goa Legislative Assembly, representing the Velim Assembly constituency since 2022. He is a member of the Aam Aadmi Party (AAP). Silva was elected as an MLA in the 2022 Goa Legislative Assembly election.

== Education ==
Silva graduated as an engineer from the Goa Engineering College, Farmagudi in 1992.

== Electoral history ==
=== 2022 assembly election, Velim ===
2022 Goa Legislative Assembly election : Velim
| Party | Candidate | Votes | % | ±% |
|---|---|---|---|---|
| AAP | Cruz Silva | 5,390 | 23.04% | ▲8.49 |
| INC | Savio D'Silva | 5,221 | 22.32% | ▼21.96 |
| AITC | Benjamin Silva | 4,134 | 17.67% | New |
| RGP | Dagley Fernandes | 3,653 | 15.62% | New |
| NCP | Filipe Nery Rodrigues | 3,420 | 14.62% | New |
| BJP | Savio Rodrigues | 1,331 | 5.69% | ▼1.81 |
| NOTA | None of the Above | 241 | 1.03% | ▼0.07 |
| Margin of victory | | 169 | 0.72% | ▼21.61 |
| Turnout | | 23,390 | 74.18% | ▼1.28 |
| Registered electors | | 31,533 | | ▲1.14 |
| AAP gain from INC | | Swing | ▼21.23 | |

== Political career ==
Silva criticized the Government of Goa in July 2026, following the collapse of a temporary floating jetty built by ONGC on the River Sal. He urged the government to prioritize a long pending training wall at the river's mouth to protect local fisherman from strong currents.

In September 2026, Silva criticized the Goa Police for filing weak charges regarding an alleged attack on local leader Gerson Gomes.

State Legislative Assembly
| Preceded by Filipe Nery Rodrigues | Member of the Goa Legislative Assembly from Velim Assembly constituency 2022 – present | Incumbent |
