= Yuri Alemao =

Indian politician and businessman (born 1985)

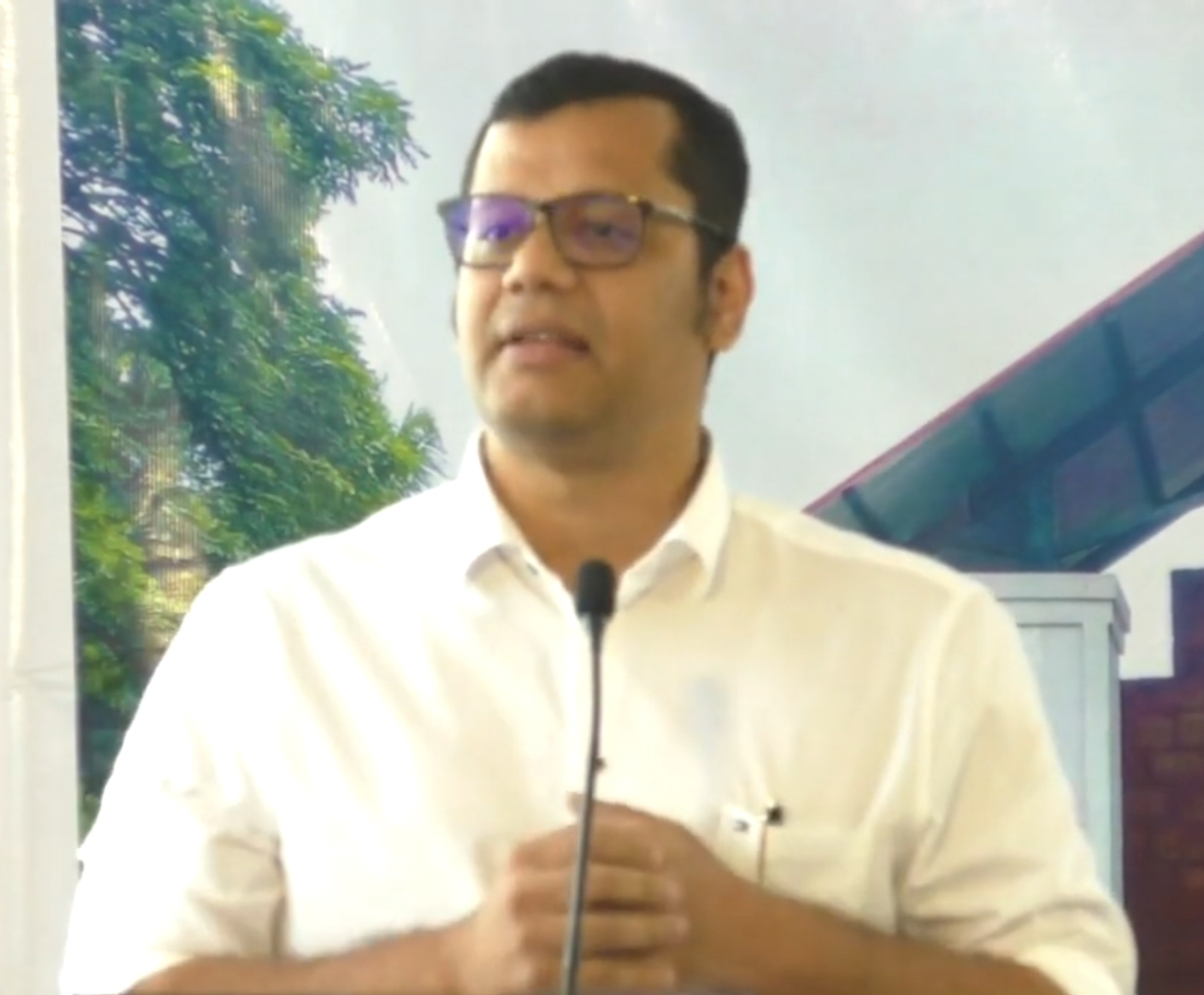
- Alemao in 2022

Leader of the Opposition of Goa Legislative Assembly
- Incumbent
- Assumed office 30 September 2022
- Governor: P. S. Sreedharan Pillai; Ashok Gajapathi Raju
- Preceded by: Michael Lobo

Member of Goa Legislative Assembly
- Incumbent
- Assumed office 10 March 2022
- Preceded by: Clafasio Dias
- Constituency: Cuncolim

Leader of the Congress Legislature Party, Goa
- In office 20 September 2022
- Preceded by: Michael Lobo

Personal details
- Born: Yuri Lenon Elias Alemao; 16 November 1984 (age 41) Margao, Goa, India
- Party: Indian National Congress (since 2020)
- Other political affiliations: Nationalist Congress Party (2012–2018); Goa Forward Party (2018–2020)
- Spouse: Veolla Melisa Dias
- Children: 2
- Relatives: Joaquim Alemao (father); Churchill Alemao (uncle)
- Occupation: Politician; businessman

Yuri Lenon Elias Alemao (Note: alternately spelt as Yuri Alemão.) (born 16 November 1984) is an Indian politician, businessman, and former aircraft pilot who has served as Leader of the Opposition in the Goa Legislative Assembly and Leader of the Congress Legislature Party in Goa since September 2022. He is a member of the Goa Legislative Assembly, representing the Cuncolim Assembly constituency since 2022.

== Early life ==
Yuri Lenon Elias Alemao was born on 16 November 1984 in Margao, Goa, to Debbie and Joaquim Alemao, a former urban development minister and MLA from the Cuncolim Assembly constituency. He has three siblings. His paternal uncle is Churchill Alemao, the former chief minister of Goa.

Alemao completed his Secondary School Certificate from Goa and has a commercial pilot licence from Basair Aviation College, New South Wales, Sydney, Australia from 2006.

== Political career ==
In February 2012, Alemao began his political career as a member of the Nationalist Congress Party (NCP). He unsuccessfully contested the 2012 Goa Legislative Assembly election from the Sanguem Assembly constituency. He lost to Bharatiya Janata Party (BJP) candidate Subhash Phal Desai by 483 votes, finishing in second place. Alemao subsequently served as the president of the NCP's youth wing in Goa.

Alemao left the NCP in August 2018 after the 2017 Goa Legislative Assembly election. He then joined the Goa Forward Party (GFP) and remained there until his resignation in November 2020. Alemao joined the Indian National Congress (INC) later that same month.

Alemao won via the Indian National Congress ticket in the 2022 Goa Legislative Assembly election from the Cuncolim Assembly constituency. He defeated Clafasio Dias of the Bharatiya Janata Party by a margin of 6,632 votes.

Alemao is credited for advocating the inclusion of the Cuncolim Revolt in the educational curricula of schools and colleges in Goa. He also raised the longstanding issue of hazardous waste disposal at the Cuncolim Industrial Estate.

== Personal life ==
Alemao is married to Viola Dias. The couple have a son and daughter together. He maintains residences at Kegdicotto, Cuncolim, and Chadwaddo, Varca.

Alemao is a practicing Catholic and an advocate of secularism.
