= Velim Assembly constituency =

Legislative Assembly constituency in Goa State, India

Coordinates: 15.16°N 73.96°E

Velim
- Constituency No. 35 for the Goa Legislative Assembly

Constituency details
- Country: India
- Region: Western India
- State: Goa
- District: South Goa
- Lok Sabha constituency: South Goa
- Established: 1989
- Total electors: 31,534
- Reservation: None

Member of Legislative Assembly
- 8th Goa Legislative Assembly
- Incumbent Cruz Silva
- Party: AAP
- Elected year: 2022

Velim Assembly constituency is one of the 40 Goa Legislative Assembly constituencies of the state of Goa in southern India. Itlso one of the 20 constituencies falling under South Goa Lok Sabha constituency and includes villages and towns like Velim, Assolna, Ambelim, Chinchinim and Sao Jose de Areal.

It has traditionally been regarded as a longstanding stronghold of the Congress party.

== Members of the Goa Legislative Assembly ==
Year	Member	Party
1989	Farrel Furtado	Indian National Congress
1994	Manu Fernandes	Independent
1999	Filipe Nery Rodrigues	Indian National Congress
2002	Filipe Nery Rodrigues	Independent
2007	Filipe Nery Rodrigues	Indian National Congress
2012	Benjamin Silva	Independent
2017	Filipe Nery Rodrigues	Indian National Congress
2022	Cruz Silva	Aam Aadmi Party

== Election results ==
=== 2027 Assembly election ===
2027 Goa Legislative Assembly election: Velim
Party	Candidate	Votes	%	±%
INC				
NDA				
NOTA	None of the above			
Majority				
Turnout				
gain from		Swing		

=== Assembly Election 2022 ===
2022 Goa Legislative Assembly election : Velim
Party	Candidate	Votes	%	±%
AAP	Cruz Silva	5,390	23.04%	▲8.49
INC	Savio D'Silva	5,221	22.32%	▼21.96
AITC	Benjamin Silva	4,134	17.67%	New
RGP	Dagley Fernandes	3,653	15.62%	New
NCP	Filipe Nery Rodrigues	3,420	14.62%	New
BJP	Savio Rodrigues	1,331	5.69%	▼1.81
NOTA	None of the Above	241	1.03%	▼0.07
Margin of victory		169	0.72%	▼21.61
Turnout		23,390	74.18%	▼1.28
Registered electors		31,533		▲1.14
AAP gain from INC		Swing	▼21.23	

=== Assembly Election 2017 ===
2017 Goa Legislative Assembly election : Velim
Party	Candidate	Votes	%	±%
INC	Filipe Nery Rodrigues	10,417	44.28%	▲7.07
Independent	Benjamin Silva	5,164	21.95%	New
AAP	Cruz Silva	3,423	14.55%	New
BJP	Vinay Tari	1,765	7.50%	New
GFP	Anthony Rodrigues (Babush)	1,460	6.21%	New
Independent	Edrich Correia	335	1.42%	New
NOTA	None of the Above	260	1.11%	New
Independent	Jose Fernandes (Champy)	236	1.00%	New
Margin of victory		5,253	22.33%	▲0.08
Turnout		23,527	75.46%	▼0.02
Registered electors		31,178		▲6.28
INC gain from Independent		Swing	▼15.18	

=== Assembly Election 2012 ===
2012 Goa Legislative Assembly election : Velim
Party	Candidate	Votes	%	±%
Independent	Benjamin Silva	13,164	59.45%	New
INC	Filipe Nery Rodrigues	8,238	37.21%	▼23.21
Independent	Cliffton Desouza	386	1.74%	New
AITC	Michael Beny Da Costa	340	1.54%	New
Margin of victory		4,926	22.25%	▲1.36
Turnout		22,142	75.43%	▲10.87
Registered electors		29,336		▲43.77
Independent gain from INC		Swing	▼0.97	

=== Assembly Election 2007 ===
2007 Goa Legislative Assembly election : Velim
Party	Candidate	Votes	%	±%
INC	Filipe Nery Rodrigues	7,965	60.42%	▲35.95
Save Goa Front	Silva Benjamin	5,211	39.53%	New
Margin of victory		2,754	20.89%	▼21.99
Turnout		13,183	64.57%	▲0.58
Registered electors		20,405		▲1.55
INC gain from Independent		Swing		

=== Assembly Election 2002 ===
2002 Goa Legislative Assembly election : Velim
Party	Candidate	Votes	%	±%
Independent	Filipe Nery Rodrigues	8,664	67.35%	New
INC	D'Silva Marcus Sebastiano	3,148	24.47%	▼41.33
UGDP	Viegas Anacleto Luis	1,053	8.18%	▼0.81
Margin of victory		5,516	42.88%	▼1.43
Turnout		12,865	64.02%	▲4.69
Registered electors		20,094		▲0.21
Independent gain from INC		Swing		

=== Assembly Election 1999 ===
1999 Goa Legislative Assembly election : Velim
Party	Candidate	Votes	%	±%
INC	Filipe Nery Rodrigues	7,829	65.80%	New
Goa Rajiv Congress Party	Manu Fernandes	2,557	21.49%	New
UGDP	Anacleto Luis Viegas	1,070	8.99%	New
BJP	Desai Vishal Shabu	436	3.66%	New
Margin of victory		5,272	44.31%	▲23.25
Turnout		11,898	59.31%	▼5.46
Registered electors		20,052		▲10.47
INC gain from Independent		Swing	▲19.81	

=== Assembly Election 1994 ===
1994 Goa Legislative Assembly election : Velim
Party	Candidate	Votes	%	±%
Independent	Manu Fernandes	5,409	45.99%	New
INC	Gracias Farrel Elvis	2,932	24.93%	
UGDP	Rodrigues Filip Cruz	2,164	18.40%	New
Independent	Cairo Savio Lourdes	459	3.90%	New
Independent	Letao Cirio Caitano	230	1.96%	New
JD	Coutinho Ciriaco Antonio	184	1.56%	New
MGP	Maximiano G. Furtado	171	1.45%	New
Margin of victory		2,477	21.06%	▼36.73
Turnout		11,762	63.87%	▼0.96
Registered electors		18,152		▲2.87
Independent gain from INC		Swing	▼31.24	

=== Assembly Election 1989 ===
1989 Goa Legislative Assembly election : Velim
Party	Candidate	Votes	%	±%
INC	Farrel Furtado	8,962	77.23%	New
JD	Rodrigues Gabriel Minguel	2,256	19.44%	New
Independent	Fernandes Roqge S. Avelino	103	0.89%	New
Margin of victory		6,706	57.79%	
Turnout		11,604	64.67%	
Registered electors		17,646		
INC win (new seat)				

== See also ==
- List of constituencies of the Goa Legislative Assembly
- South Goa district
