= Filipe Nery Rodrigues =

Indian politician and businessman (born 1962)

Filipe Rodrigues
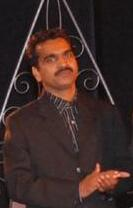
- Rodrigues in 2009

5th Deputy Chief Minister of Goa
- In office 3 February 2005 – 4 March 2005
- Preceded by: Ravi Naik
- Succeeded by: Wilfred de Souza

Member of Goa Legislative Assembly
- In office 1999–2012
- Preceded by: Manu Fernandes
- Succeeded by: Benjamin Silva
- Constituency: Velim
- In office 2017–2022
- Preceded by: Benjamin Silva
- Succeeded by: Cruz Silva

Personal details
- Born: Filipe Nery Rodrigues; 19 October 1962 (age 64) Salcete, Goa, India
- Party: Nationalist Congress Party
- Other political affiliations: Indian National Congress; Bharatiya Janata Party
- Education: Diploma in Civil Engineering
- Alma mater: Government Polytechnic, Panaji
- Profession: Civil Engineer; businessman

Filipe Nery Rodrigues (born 19 October 1962) is an Indian politician, businessman and civil engineer who served as the fifth Deputy Chief Minister of Goa from February to March 2005. He is a former member of the Goa Legislative Assembly, representing the Velim Assembly constituency in the 1999, 2002, 2007, and 2017 elections as a member of the Indian National Congress (INC). In July 2019, he was one of ten INC members who defected to the Bharatiya Janata Party.

== Early life and education ==
Rodrigues was born on 19 October 1962 in Salcete, Goa, the son of Cruz Rodrigues. He completed his diploma in civil engineering at Government Polytechnic, Panaji in 1984.
