= Joaquim Alemao =

Indian politician (born 1957)

Urban development Minister, Government of Goa
- In office 2007–2012

Member of the Goa Legislative Assembly
- In office 2002–2012
- Preceded by: Arecio D'Souza
- Succeeded by: Subhash Rajan Naik
- Constituency: Cuncolim

Personal details
- Born: 8 November 1957 (age 68)
- Party: Indian National Congress
- Children: Yuri Alemao (son)
- Relatives: Churchill Alemao (brother)
- Occupation: Politician
- Website: joaquimalemao.in

Joaquim Alemao (born 8 November 1957) is an Indian politician who served as the Urban development minister in the Government of Goa and a two-term member of the Goa Legislative Assembly.

== Personal life ==
Alemao is from a political family; his brother Churchill Alemao is a former Member of Parliament of the 14th Lok Sabha of India.

== Football club ==
Alemao and his family own a football team called Churchill Brothers.
