= Benjamin Silva =

Indian politician

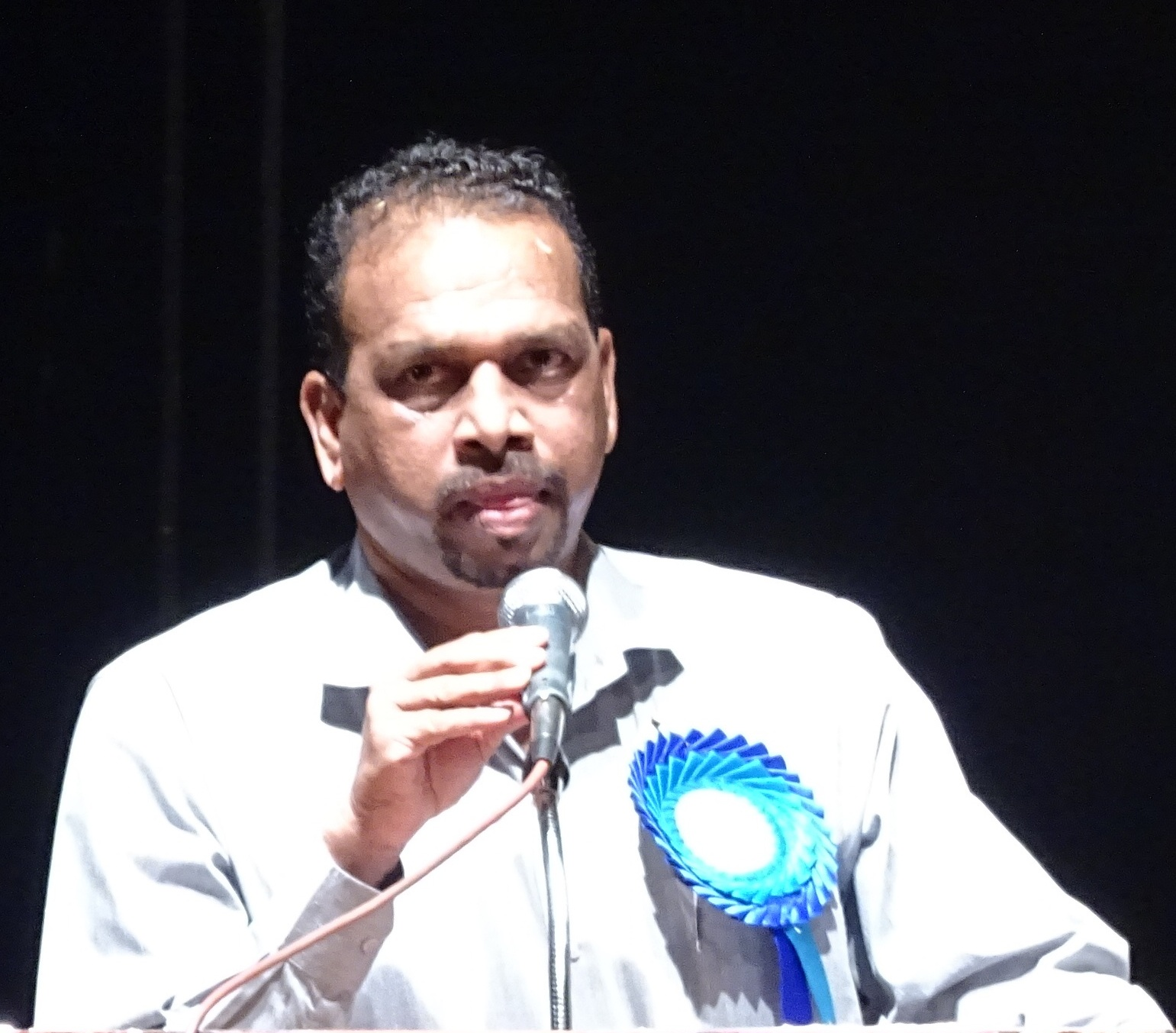
- Silva in 2016

Member of Goa Legislative Assembly
- In office 2012–2017
- Preceded by: Filipe Nery Rodrigues
- Succeeded by: Filipe Nery Rodrigues
- Constituency: Velim

Personal details
- Born: Goa, India
- Party: All India Trinamool Congress
- Other political affiliations: Independent
- Education: 10th Pass
- Profession: Fishing Business

Benjamin Silva is an Indian politician. He was elected to the Goa Legislative Assembly from Velim in the 2012 Goa Legislative Assembly election as an Independent member.
