= Cuncolim Assembly constituency =

Legislative Assembly constituency in Goa State, India

Coordinates: 15.184°N 74.003°E

Cuncolim
- Constituency No. 34 for the Goa Legislative Assembly

Constituency details
- Country: India
- Region: Western India
- State: Goa
- District: South Goa
- Lok Sabha constituency: South Goa
- Established: 1963
- Total electors: 29,526
- Reservation: None

Member of Legislative Assembly
- 8th Goa Legislative Assembly
- Incumbent Yuri Alemao
- Party: Indian National Congress

Cuncolim Assembly constituency is one of the 40 Goa Legislative Assembly constituencies of the state of Goa in southern India. Cuncolim is also one of the 20 constituencies falling under South Goa Lok Sabha constituency.

== Members of Goa Legislative Assembly ==
Year	Member	Party
1963	Sebastiao Mazarelo	United Goans Party
1967	Roque Santana Fernandes	United Goans Party
1972	Roque Santana Fernandes	United Goans Party
1977	Ferdino Rebello	Janata Party
1980	Jose Mario Vaz	Indian National Congress
1984	Manuel Gregorio Fernandes	Indian National Congress
1989	Manuel Gregorio Fernandes	Indian National Congress
1994	Arecio D'Souza	United Goans Democratic Party
1999	Arecio D'Souza	United Goans Democratic Party
2002	Joaquim Alemao	Indian National Congress
2007	Joaquim Alemao	Indian National Congress
2012	Subhash Rajan Naik	Bharatiya Janata Party
2017	Clafasio Dias	Indian National Congress
2022	Yuri Alemao	Indian National Congress

== Election results ==
=== 2027 Assembly election ===
2027 Goa Legislative Assembly election: Cuncolim
Party	Candidate	Votes	%	±%
INC				
NDA				
NOTA	None of the above			
Majority				
Turnout				
gain from		Swing		

=== Assembly Election 2022 ===
2022 Goa Legislative Assembly election : Cuncolim
Party	Candidate	Votes	%	±%
INC	Yuri Alemao	9,866	42.49%	▲13.90
BJP	Clafasio Dias	6,632	28.56%	▲6.07
RGP	Wilson Peter Cardozo	2,430	10.47%	New
Independent	Santosh S. Fal Dessai	1,326	5.71%	New
AITC	Jorson Piedade Fernandes	1,282	5.52%	New
AAP	Prashant Naik	906	3.90%	▼11.41
Independent	Sudesh Vinayak Bhise	312	1.34%	New
NOTA	None of the Above	186	0.80%	▼0.30
Margin of victory		3,234	13.93%	▲13.78
Turnout		23,219	77.62%	▲1.44
Registered electors		29,526		▲1.58
INC hold		Swing	▲13.90	

=== Assembly Election 2017 ===
2017 Goa Legislative Assembly election : Cuncolim
Party	Candidate	Votes	%	±%
INC	Clafasio Dias	6,415	28.59%	▼2.38
Independent	Joaquim Alemao	6,382	28.44%	New
BJP	Subhash Alias Rajan K. Naik	5,047	22.49%	▼14.80
AAP	Elvis Gomes	3,437	15.32%	New
Goa Vikas Party	John Inacio Monteiro	488	2.17%	New
SS	Devendra Dessai	313	1.39%	New
NOTA	None of the Above	247	1.10%	New
Margin of victory		33	0.15%	▼6.18
Turnout		22,440	77.20%	▼0.33
Registered electors		29,067		▲8.60
INC gain from BJP		Swing	▼8.70	

=== Assembly Election 2012 ===
2012 Goa Legislative Assembly election : Cuncolim
Party	Candidate	Votes	%	±%
BJP	Subhash Rajan Naik	7,738	37.29%	▲25.26
INC	Joaquim Alemao	6,425	30.96%	▼27.54
Independent	John Inacio Monteiro	4,830	23.28%	New
Independent	Milagres Gonsalves	603	2.91%	New
UGDP	Jose Alias Brany Fernandes	543	2.62%	▼19.76
Independent	Rony Rodrigues	191	0.92%	New
Margin of victory		1,313	6.33%	▼29.79
Turnout		20,751	77.49%	▲14.47
Registered electors		26,764		▲10.82
BJP gain from INC		Swing	▼21.21	

=== Assembly Election 2007 ===
2007 Goa Legislative Assembly election : Cuncolim
Party	Candidate	Votes	%	±%
INC	Joaquim Alemao	8,909	58.50%	▲14.03
UGDP	Fernandes Jorson Piedade	3,408	22.38%	▲20.88
BJP	Gonsalves Milagres Methew	1,832	12.03%	▼7.91
Independent	Rodrigues John J.	758	4.98%	New
Independent	Jerry Fernandes	292	1.92%	New
Margin of victory		5,501	36.12%	▲19.60
Turnout		15,229	62.94%	▲0.60
Registered electors		24,150		▲4.38
INC hold		Swing	▲14.03	

=== Assembly Election 2002 ===
2002 Goa Legislative Assembly election : Cuncolim
Party	Candidate	Votes	%	±%
INC	Joaquim Alemao	6,426	44.47%	▲0.57
NCP	Arecio D'Souza	4,038	27.94%	New
BJP	Julio D'Silva	2,881	19.94%	▼6.23
Independent	Naik Laxman Ganesh	703	4.87%	New
UGDP	Cardozo Filipinho Bill	217	1.50%	▼5.49
Independent	Judas Fernandes	181	1.25%	New
Margin of victory		2,388	16.53%	▼1.21
Turnout		14,450	62.44%	▲5.76
Registered electors		23,136		▲5.06
INC hold		Swing	▲0.57	

=== Assembly Election 1999 ===
1999 Goa Legislative Assembly election : Cuncolim
Party	Candidate	Votes	%	±%
INC	Arecio D'Souza	5,481	43.90%	New
BJP	D Silva Julio Teodomiro	3,267	26.17%	New
Goa Rajiv Congress Party	Coutinho Ronulfo Lawrence Soude Alias Coutinho Ranulfo	1,398	11.20%	New
UGDP	Ramesh Uttam Desai	873	6.99%	▼32.25
Independent	Cardozo Fillipinho Bill John	842	6.74%	New
MGP	Desai Ulhas Bhiku	615	4.93%	New
Margin of victory		2,214	17.73%	▲0.05
Turnout		12,486	56.65%	▼10.65
Registered electors		22,022		▲9.93
INC gain from UGDP		Swing	▲4.66	

=== Assembly Election 1994 ===
1994 Goa Legislative Assembly election : Cuncolim
Party	Candidate	Votes	%	±%
UGDP	Arecio D'Souza	5,294	39.24%	New
INC	Shantaram Laxman Naik	2,909	21.56%	
Independent	Mascarenhas Joseph Miguel	2,362	17.51%	New
BJP	Dessai Shabu Babani	1,620	12.01%	New
Independent	Bill Cardozo	911	6.75%	New
BSP	Cavarlho Santano Francisco	88	0.65%	New
Margin of victory		2,385	17.68%	▲9.60
Turnout		13,492	66.55%	▼0.80
Registered electors		20,032		▲4.94
UGDP gain from INC		Swing	▲6.62	

=== Assembly Election 1989 ===
1989 Goa Legislative Assembly election : Cuncolim
Party	Candidate	Votes	%	±%
INC	Manu Fernandes	4,243	32.62%	▼10.13
MGP	Dessai Shebu Babali	3,192	24.54%	New
Independent	Mascarenhas Joseph Mingui	2,398	18.43%	New
Independent	D'Souza Arecio Agapito	2,338	17.97%	New
Independent	Velvatkar Prakash Ramnath	550	4.23%	New
Margin of victory		1,051	8.08%	▼12.33
Turnout		13,009	67.15%	▲3.94
Registered electors		19,089		▼5.34
INC hold		Swing	▼10.13	

=== Assembly Election 1984 ===
1984 Goa, Daman and Diu Legislative Assembly election : Cuncolim
Party	Candidate	Votes	%	±%
INC	Manu Fernandes	5,535	42.75%	New
Independent	Naique Dessai Motilal Rogunata	2,893	22.34%	New
JP	Ferdino Rebello	2,057	15.89%	New
Independent	Silva Marcus Sebastiao	1,176	9.04%	New
MGP	Dessai Dattaram Dev	792	6.09%	New
Independent	Dessa Satish	145	1.11%	New
Margin of victory		2,642	20.40%	▼22.47
Turnout		12,948	62.47%	▲6.22
Registered electors		20,165		▲5.03
INC gain from INC(U)		Swing	▼23.07	

=== Assembly Election 1980 ===
1980 Goa, Daman and Diu Legislative Assembly election : Cuncolim
Party	Candidate	Votes	%	±%
INC(U)	Jose Vaz	7,328	65.82%	New
MGP	Afronio Francisco gregorio vaz(Afranco)	2,555	22.95%	New
JP	Ferdino Rebello	482	4.33%	
Independent	Dessai Sada Shambu	209	1.88%	New
Independent	Paes Emiterio Nazazeno	119	1.07%	New
Independent	Cruz Furtado	84	0.75%	New
Independent	Damodar Dattaram Delvi	73	0.66%	New
Margin of victory		4,773	42.87%	▲42.49
Turnout		11,133	56.51%	▲1.13
Registered electors		19,199		▲3.19
INC(U) gain from JP		Swing	▲34.43	

=== Assembly Election 1977 ===
1977 Goa, Daman and Diu Legislative Assembly election : Cuncolim
Party	Candidate	Votes	%	±%
JP	Ferdino Rebello	3,321	31.40%	New
INC	Roque Santana Fernandes	3,281	31.02%	New
MGP	Dessai Shabu Babani	2,643	24.99%	New
Independent	Sanvardekar Upendra Narencinva	500	4.73%	New
Independent	Dessai Soda Shambu	378	3.57%	New
Independent	Fernandes Hilario Roque	300	2.84%	New
Margin of victory		40	0.38%	▼23.34
Turnout		10,578	56.12%	▼8.54
Registered electors		18,605		▲30.95
JP gain from UGP		Swing	▼26.05	

=== Assembly Election 1972 ===
1972 Goa, Daman and Diu Legislative Assembly election : Cuncolim
Party	Candidate	Votes	%	±%
UGP	Roque Santana Fernandes	5,337	57.44%	▲15.28
MGP	Fernandes A. J. Guilman	3,133	33.72%	New
SSP	Anasiasio Almedia	600	6.46%	New
Margin of victory		2,204	23.72%	▲0.77
Turnout		9,291	64.27%	▲1.24
Registered electors		14,208		▲1.83
UGP hold		Swing	▲15.28	

=== Assembly Election 1967 ===
1967 Goa, Daman and Diu Legislative Assembly election : Cuncolim
Party	Candidate	Votes	%	±%
UGP	Roque Santana Fernandes	3,774	42.17%	New
MGP	K. M. Jaiwant	1,720	19.22%	New
United Goans Party (Furtado Group)	A. Almeida	1,162	12.98%	New
Independent	J. J. Furtado	1,020	11.40%	New
Independent	L. P. Timotio	837	9.35%	New
Independent	F. G. Rodolfo	101	1.13%	New
Margin of victory		2,054	22.95%	
Turnout		8,950	62.01%	
Registered electors		13,952		
UGP win (new seat)				

== See also ==
- List of constituencies of the Goa Legislative Assembly
- South Goa district
