= Goa Pradesh Congress Committee =

Goa affiliate of the Indian National Congress

- President: Girish Chodankar
- Chairman: Yuri Alemao
- Headquarters: D.B. Bandodkar Marg, Panaji-403001, Goa
- Youth wing: Goa Youth Congress
- Women's wing: Goa Pradesh Mahila Congress Committee
- Ideology: Populism; Social liberalism; Democratic socialism; Social democracy; Secularism
- ECI status: A State Unit of Indian National Congress
- Alliance: Indian National Developmental Inclusive Alliance
- Seats in Rajya Sabha: 0 / 1
- Seats in Lok Sabha: 1 / 2
- Seats in Goa Legislative Assembly: 3 / 40

Election symbol

Goa Pradesh Congress Committee or (GPCC) is the state unit of Indian National Congress for the State of Goa. It is responsible for organizing and coordinating the party's activities and campaigns within the state, as well as selecting candidates for local, state, and national elections. Its headquarters are located at the Dayanand Bandodkar Road. in Panaji, Goa. The incumbent President of the Goa Pradesh Congress Committee is Amit Patkar.

== Structure and composition ==
S.no	Name	Designation
1.	Manikrao Thakre	AICC Incharge
2.	Amit Patkar	President; Goa Pradesh Congress Committee
3.	Yuri Alemao	Working President & CLP Leader; Goa Pradesh Congress Committee
4.	Beena Shantaram Naik	President; Goa Pradesh Mahila Congress
5.	Joel Andrade	President; Goa Pradesh Youth Congress
6.	Naushad Chowdhari	President; Goa Pradesh NSUI

== List of presidents ==
S.no	President	Portrait	Term	
1.	Luizinho Faleiro		1999	2004
2.	Francisco Sardinha		2004	September 2008
3.	Subhash Shirodkar		September 2008	July 2013
4.	John Fernandes		July 2013	7 October 2014
(1).	Luizinho Faleiro		7 October 2014	8 July 2017
5.	Shantaram Naik		8 July 2017	9 June 2018
6.	Girish Chodankar		9 June 2018	31 March 2023
7.	Amit Patkar		31 March 2023	29 May 2026
(6).	Girish Chodankar		29 May 2026	incumbent

== Goa Legislative Assembly election ==
Year	Party leader	Seats won	Change in seats	Outcome
1963	Kalidas Patel	1 / 30	New	Opposition
1967		0 / 30	▼1	Opposition
1972	H. Vallabhabhai Tendel	1 / 30	▲1	Opposition
1977	Pratapsingh Rane	10 / 30	▲9	Opposition
1980	Pratapsingh Rane	20 / 30	▲10	Government
1984	Pratapsingh Rane	18 / 30	▼2	Government
1989	Pratapsingh Rane	20 / 40	▲2	Government
1994	Pratapsingh Rane	18 / 40	▼2	Government
1999	Luizinho Faleiro	21 / 40	▲3	Government
2002	Pratapsingh Rane	16 / 40	▼5	Opposition
2007	Digambar Kamat	16 / 40	Steady	Government
2012	Digambar Kamat	9 / 40	▼7	Opposition
2017	Pratapsingh Rane	17 / 40	▲8	Opposition
2022	Digambar Kamat	11 / 40	▼6	Opposition

== Performance in Lok Sabha Elections ==
Lok Sabha Elections
Year	Lok Sabha	Seats contested	Seats won	(+/-) in seats	% of votes	Vote swing	Popular vote	Outcome
Goa, Daman And Diu
1967	4th	1	0 / 2	New entry	5.47%	New entry	15,205	Government
1971	5th	1	1 / 2	▲1	24.43%	▲18.96	57,627	Government
1977	6th	1	1 / 2	Steady	39.98%	▲15.55	1,17,150	Opposition
1980	7th	1	0 / 2	▼1	12.19%	▼27.79	43,030	Government
1984	8th	2	2 / 2	▲2	46.21%	▲34.02	1,88,779	Government
Goa
1989	9th	2	1 / 2	▼1	47.43%	▲1.22	1,98,100	Opposition
1991	10th	2	2 / 2	▲1	57.66%	▲10.23	1,81,434	Government
1996	11th	2	0 / 2	▼2	34.37%	▼23.29	1,65,857	Opposition
1998	12th	2	2 / 2	▲2	31.59%	▼2.78	1,68,314	Opposition
1999	13th	2	0 / 2	▼2	39.01%	▲7.42	1,59,844	Opposition
2004	14th	1	1 / 2	▲1	29.76%	▼9.25	1,64,432	Government
2009	15th	1	1 / 2	Steady	22.60%	▼7.16	1,27,494	Government
2014	16th	2	0 / 2	▼1	36.57%	▲13.97	2,98,750	Opposition
2019	17th	2	1 / 2	▲1	42.92%	▲6.35	3,66,158	Opposition
2024	18th	2	1 / 2	Steady	39.71%	▼3.21	3,56,213	Opposition

== MPs and MLAs from Goa ==
S.No.	Name	Constituency
Member of Parliament
1	Viriato Fernandes	South Goa
Member of Legislative Assembly
1	Carlos Alvares Ferreira	Aldona
2	Altone D'Costa	Quepem
3	Yuri Alemao	Cuncolim

== Factions ==
Goa Congress was a former regional political party in Goa. It was a splinter faction of Indian National Congress and was led by Wilfred de Souza. Later it merged with the Congress Party.

== See also ==
- Indian National Congress
- Congress Working Committee
- All India Congress Committee
- Pradesh Congress Committee
- All India Mahila Congress
- Indian Youth Congress
- National Students Union of India
