= Cuncolim =

- City
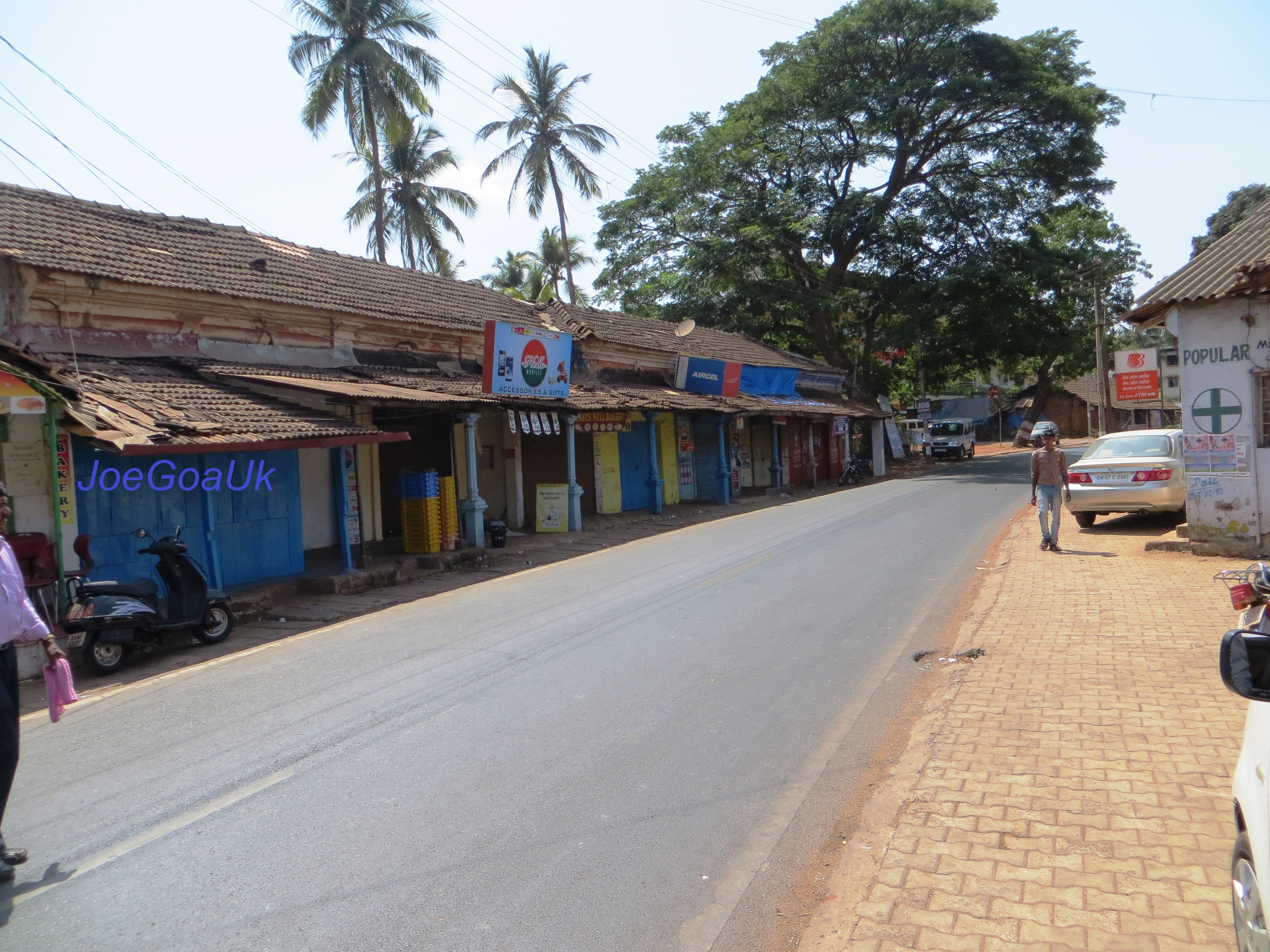
- Cuncolim market in 2013

- Location in Goa, India Cuncolim (India)
- Coordinates: 15°10′12″N 73°58′48″E
- Country: India
- State: Goa
- District: South Goa
- Sub-district: Salcete
- Established: Before 1583
- Named for: kumkumahalli

Government
  - Type: municipal corporation
  - MLA: Yuri Alemao
  - Chairperson: Laxman Naik
- Elevation: 13 m (43 ft)

Population (2011)
  - Total: 16,623
- Demonym: kunkolkar

Languages
  - Official: Konkani
- Time zone: UTC+5:30 (IST)
- PIN: 403703
- Vehicle registration: GA-08

Cuncolim (formerly Kumkumahalli) is a city in South Goa district in the state of Goa, India.

== Geography ==
Cuncolim is located at 15.17°N 73.98°E. It has an average elevation of 13 m (43 ft).

== History ==
It is a former village, now with a municipal council of its own, in the south Goa sub-district (taluka) of Salcette, India. It is part of the AVC (Assolna-Velim-Cuncolim) network of villages.

There are twelve chardo (kshtriya) Vangodds (clans) of Ganvkars (landlords) in the city. Their names, in order of precedence, are as follows: Mhal, Shetcar, Naik, Mangro, Shet, Tombddo, Porob, Sidakalo, Lokakalo, Bandekar, Rounom and Becklo.

Cuncolim was the site of the Cuncolim revolt in 1583. Those killed on the Christian side on July 15, 1583, included four converts and five Jesuit missionaries: Frs Rodolfo Aquaviva, Afonso Pacheco, Antonio Francisco, Pero Berno and Br Francisco Aranha, later beatified as the "Martyrs of Cuncolim".

Cuncolim was the original site of the famous temple of Shantadurga before almost all the villagers converted to Christianity and the temple was demolished. The few remaining Hindu families took the idol of Shree Shantadurga to Fatorpa where the new temple of Shantadurga Cuncolikarin stands today.

== Demographics ==
Cuncolim has population of 16,623 (7,924 males, 8,699 females) with 50.42% being Hindu, 37.58% Christian, and 11.82% Muslim as per reports released by India’s Population Census 2011. Other religious minorities are present in trace numbers.

The village’s native Christian community consists of Goan Catholics originating from Kshatriya noblemen, known as Chardo, presently numbering 3000.

Cuncolim also houses a Scheduled Tribe community of 738 and a Scheduled Caste population of 157 individuals as per Population Census 2011.

== Education ==
Cuncolim is home to National Institute of Technology Goa, an autonomous institution in western India of national importance. It is one of the 31 N.I.T.s in the country.

Cuncolim has 5 high schools; Our Lady of Health, Cuncolim United, Infant Jesus, Maria Bambina Convent and St. Anthony High School. Higher secondary needs are catered to by Maria Bambina and United Higher secondary, former has Arts and Commerce stream whereas latter has both the streams in addition to Science.

Cuncolim United College is the only college in Cuncolim which mostly has students from areas surrounding Cuncolim and also there is Graduation College namely Cuncolim Education Society of Arts and Commerce which provides Degree Course of B. A and B. COM for students of Cuncolim and surrounding areas.

== Culture ==
Cuncolim has a unique traditional village irrigation, involving 12 bunds (water-gathering centres). It has also 12 residential clans (or "vangodds"). Cuncolim Union is one of the social organisations formed by people of this area.

== Government and politics ==
Cuncolim is part of Cuncolim (Goa Assembly constituency) and South Goa (Lok Sabha constituency).

== Places of interest ==
Cuncolim is home to the Molanguinim Cave, small waterfalls and the Nayaband Lake.

== See also ==
- Cuncolim Revolt
