= Romeo Fernandes =

Indian footballer

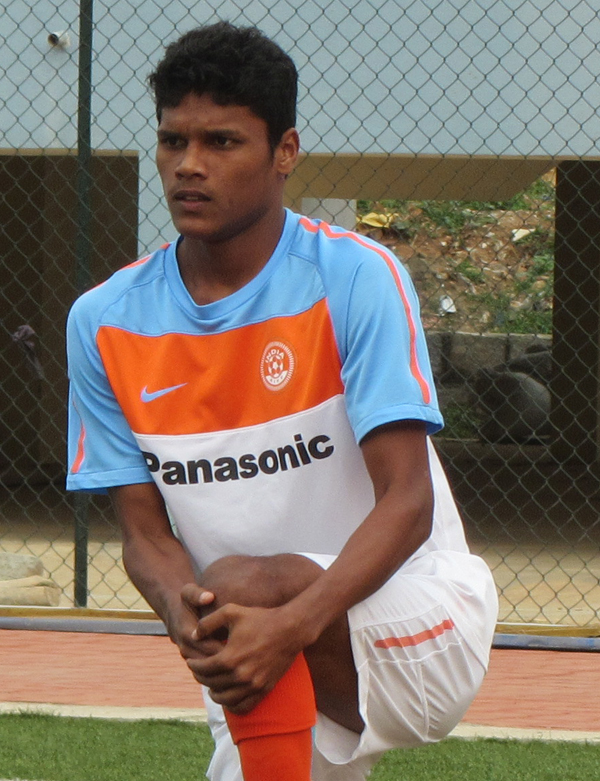
- Fernandes in training with India U23 in 2012

Personal information
- Full name: Romeo Fernandes
- Date of birth: 6 July 1992 (age 34)
- Place of birth: Assolna, Goa, India
- Height: 1.68 m (5 ft 6 in)
- Position: Winger

Youth career
- 2010–2011: Dempo
- 2010–2011: Margao

Senior career*
| Years | Team | Apps | (Gls) |
| 2011–2016 | Dempo | 36 | (1) |
| 2014 | → Goa (loan) | 11 | (3) |
| 2015 | → Atlético Paranaense (loan) | 1 | (0) |
| 2015 | → Goa (loan) | 14 | (3) |
| 2016–2017 | Goa | 12 | (1) |
| 2017 | → East Bengal (loan) | 8 | (0) |
| 2017–2019 | Delhi Dynamos | 23 | (1) |
| 2019–2020 | Odisha | 3 | (0) |
| 2021 | Goa | 0 | (0) |
| 2021–2022 | East Bengal | 0 | (0) |

International career
| 2012–2016 | India U23 | 4 | (3) |
| 2015–2019 | India | 1 | (0) |
- * Club domestic league appearances and goals as of 2 September 2021

Romeo Fernandes (born 6 July 1992) is an Indian former professional footballer who last played as a winger for East Bengal in the Indian Super League.

== Early life and education ==
Romeo Fernandes was born on 6 July 1992 in Assolna, Goa. He did his schooling at Regina Martyrum High School.

== Club career ==
=== Dempo ===
Romeo was scouted by Dempo youth team scout Joaquim Crasto in 2010, joining the club's youth team the same year. He was a key player for the Dempo's youth teams at U18, U19 and U20 levels. Dempo loaned out Romeo to Margao SC in the Goa Second Division where he helped Margao to promotion to the Goa Professional League in 2011. Back at Dempo for the 2011–12 I-League, he made his professional senior team debut the same season while he would also make 8 appearances, scoring 7 times during the 2012 I-League U20 Romeo registered his first I-League assist for Dempo on 28 November 2012 against Mohun Bagan, assisting Joaquim Abranches in the 40th minute for the first goal of the match in a 3–0 win.

=== FC Goa (loan) ===
Romeo joined FC Goa on loan for the 2014 Indian Super League. On 22 November, Romeo scored his first goal for the club in a 2–0 win over Pune City, starting in place of the injured Robert Pires and opening the scoring in the fifth minute with a glancing header. On 1 December 2014, he again found the net, in the 33rd minute, opening the scoring in a 3–0 against NorthEast United which also happened to be the 100th goal of the 2014 season. He scored his third goal for his team in a 3–1 win away at Chennaiyin, the latter's first home defeat of the season. Fernandes' impressive performances led to high praise from FC Goa coach and Brazilian legend Zico as well as interest from Brazilian club Atlético Paranaense.

=== Return to Dempo ===
On 29 December Fernandes scored on his return to Dempo in the group stage of the 2014–15 Federation Cup, heading in the only goal of the game from Tolgay Özbey's cross in the 40th minute. Romeo scored his second goal of the cup against Sporting Goa during a 4–1 win. He had a fantastic Federation Cup, scoring 4 goals in 6 matches. Romeo started Dempo's first game of the 2014–15 season but was injured early on in the game and replaced.

=== Atlético Paranaense (loan) ===
Romeo joined Atlético Paranaense on 15 February 2015 on loan from parent club Dempo until the end of June 2015, initially joining the U-23 team that competes in the state of Parana. Atletico had the option to renew the contract until December 2015 and also had the option to make the loan permanent after extending the loan. Romeo was promoted to the senior team by the new coach of Atletico, Enderson Moreira after impressing in training. He made his debut for Atletico Paranaenese on 3 May in the Campeonato Paranaense against Nacional PR in the local state competition, coming on for Rafinha in the 67th minute of a 5–0 victory, and thus becoming the first Indian to play in South America professionally at a senior level.

=== Return to Goa ===
On 25 May 2015, it was announced that Atlético Paranaense had released Romeo and that he would re-join FC Goa for the 2015 Indian Super League. On 6 December 2015, Fernandes scored twice against Delhi Dynamos as FC Goa came from 2–0 down to win 3–2.

He joined Goa for the 2016 Indian Super League. On 11 November 2016, he assisted and scored a goal in the 94th–minute to give Goa a 2–1 victory over NorthEast United and also their first home win of the season.

=== East Bengal (loan) ===
On 1 January 2017, Romeo joined East Bengal on loan for the remaining 2016–17 I-League season.

=== Delhi Dynamos ===
Delhy Dynamos signed Romeo in the 2017–18 Indian Super League player draft for domestic players. On 27 March 2018, he signed a two-year contract extension with club.

=== AFC Champions League with Goa ===
On 7 April 2021, after trials with the club, Romeo was named in FC Goa's 28-man squad for 2021 AFC Champions League He featured in Goa's second group stage game against Al-Rayyan.

=== East Bengal ===
On 31 August 2021, Romeo joined East Bengal on a one-year deal ahead of the 2021–22 Indian Super League.

== International career ==
After good performances in the 2012 I-League U20 season, Romeo was called up to the India U23 team for the 2013 AFC U22 Qualifiers in Oman. He made his debut for the under-23 team on 28 June 2012 against the United Arab Emirates U22, coming on as a 49th-minute substitute for Shaiju Mon and would score the equalizer in the 87th minute as India U23 went on to draw the match 1–1. Romeo scored his 2nd goal of the tournament against Turkmenistan U22 in a 4–1 win.

Romeo became the 500th player to debut for the senior Indian team against Guam in a Group D 2018 FIFA World Cup qualifier on 12 November 2015, in their 1–0 win.

== Career statistics ==
=== Club ===
As of 30 August 2021

| Club | Season | League | | | Cup | | Other | | Continental | | Total | |
| Club | Season | Division | Apps | Goals | Apps | Goals | Apps | Goals | Apps | Goals | Apps | Goals |
|---|---|---|---|---|---|---|---|---|---|---|---|---|
| Dempo | 2011–12 | I-League | 3 | 0 | 0 | 0 | 0 | 0 | — | — | 3 | 0 |
| Dempo | 2012–13 | I-League | 13 | 0 | 2 | 0 | 0 | 0 | — | — | 15 | 0 |
| Dempo | 2013–14 | I-League | 9 | 1 | 3 | 0 | 0 | 0 | — | — | 12 | 1 |
| Dempo | 2014–15 | I-League | 1 | 0 | 6 | 4 | 0 | 0 | — | — | 7 | 4 |
| Dempo | 2015–16 | I-League 2nd Div | 10 | 0 | — | — | — | — | — | — | 10 | 0 |
| Dempo | Dempo total | | 36 | 1 | 11 | 4 | 0 | 0 | — | — | 47 | 5 |
| FC Goa (loan) | 2014 | Indian Super League | 11 | 3 | — | — | — | — | — | — | 11 | 3 |
| Atlético Paranaense (loan) | 2015 | Série A | 0 | 0 | 0 | 0 | 1 | 0 | — | — | 1 | 0 |
| FC Goa (loan) | 2015 | Indian Super League | 14 | 2 | — | — | — | — | — | — | 14 | 2 |
| FC Goa (loan) | 2016 | Indian Super League | 12 | 1 | — | — | — | — | — | — | 12 | 1 |
| East Bengal (loan) | 2016–17 | I-League | 8 | 0 | — | — | — | — | — | — | 8 | 0 |
| Delhi Dynamos | 2017—18 | Indian Super League | 12 | 0 | — | — | — | — | — | — | 12 | 0 |
| Delhi Dynamos | 2018—19 | Indian Super League | 11 | 1 | — | — | — | — | — | — | 11 | 1 |
| Delhi Dynamos | Delhi total | | 23 | 1 | — | — | — | — | — | — | 23 | 1 |
| Odisha | 2019—20 | Indian Super League | 3 | 0 | — | — | — | — | — | — | 3 | 0 |
| Goa | 2020—21 | Indian Super League | 0 | 0 | — | — | — | — | 1 | 0 | 1 | 0 |
| Career total | | | 107 | 8 | 11 | 4 | 1 | 0 | 1 | 0 | 120 | 12 |

== Honours ==
Dempo

- I-League: 2011–12
- I-League 2nd Division: 2015–16

== See also ==
- List of Indian football players in foreign leagues
- List of foreign Campeonato Brasileiro Série A players
