= Regina Martyrum High School =

Co-educational school in Goa, India

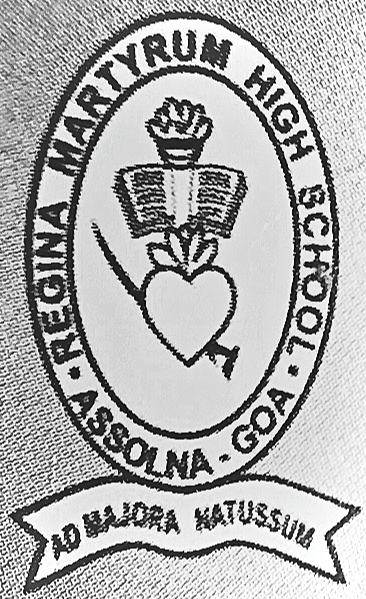

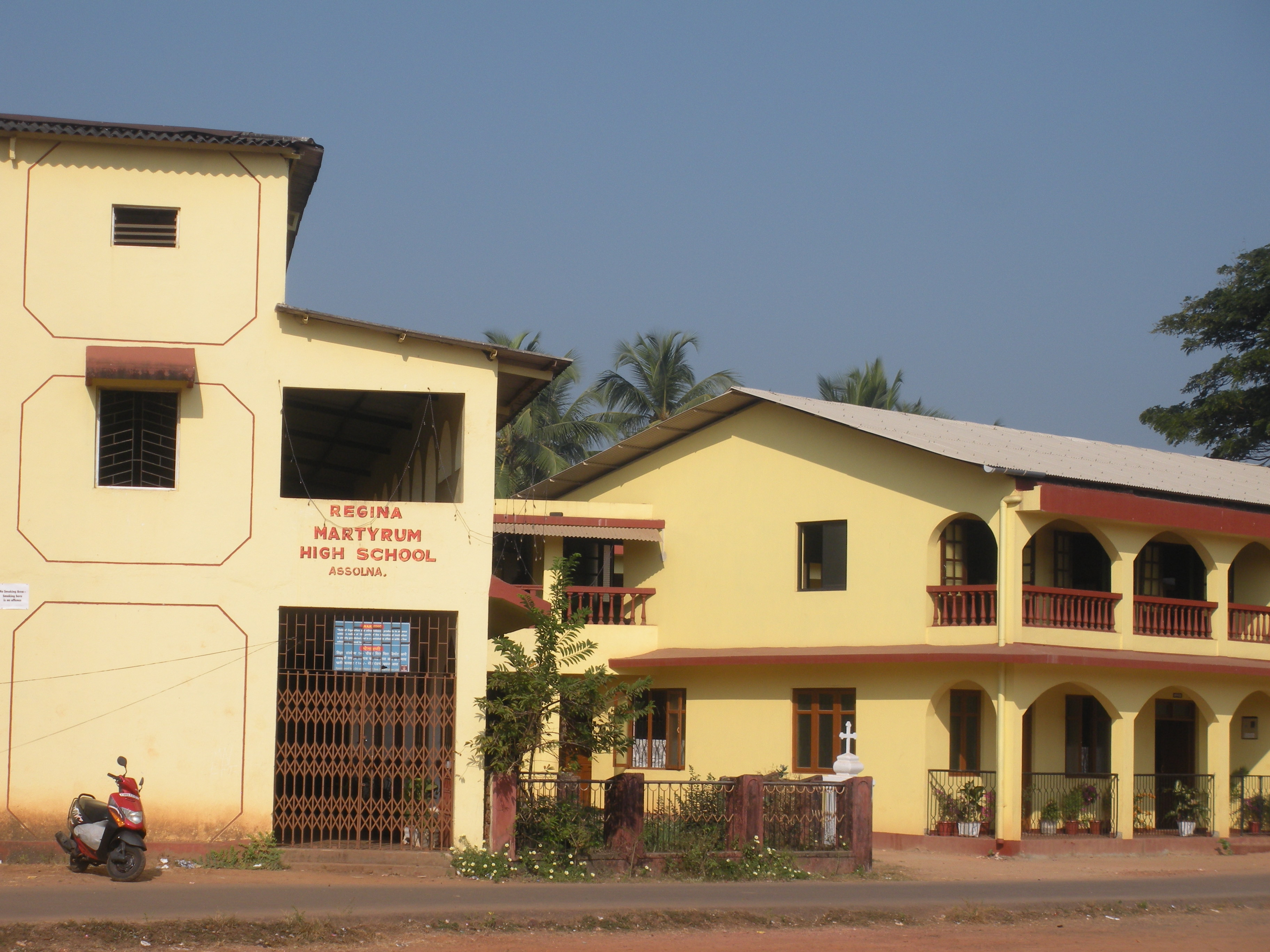
- Façade of Regina Martyrum High School

Location
- Assolna, Goa, India; 403701
- Coordinates: 15.182411°N 73.970060°E

Information
- Type: Private aided primary and secondary school
- Motto: Latin: Ad majora natussum (Born for Greater Values)
- Religious affiliation: Catholicism
- Patron saint: Queen of Martyrs
- Established: 29 August 1962; 63 years ago
- Founder: Fr. Jose Martinho Rodrigues de Silva
- School board: Goa Board of Secondary and Higher Secondary Education, Porvorim
- Authority: Diocesan Society of Education, Panjim
- School number: SAL08.41 (Note: this represents the school's index number.)
- Secondary Manager: Fr. Romeu Godinho
- Headmistress: Miriam Afonso
- Primary Manager: Fr. Mansueto Fernandes
- Staff: 25 (Note: including one vacant post of Bus driver)
- Teaching staff: 15
- Grades: Nursery to 10th grade
- Gender: Co-educational
- Age range: 3 to 16
- Enrollment: 293
- Student to teacher ratio: 42
- Language: English
- Hours in school day: 3–6 (Note: The hours for the secondary section are from 7:55 am to 1:40 pm, for the primary section from 7:55 am to 1:25 pm, and for nursery and kindergarten from 8:00 am to 11:30 am.)
- Classrooms: 8
- Campus type: Rural
- Houses: Red; Green; Blue; Yellow
- Song: "God's Glory is our Mother's ambition..." (Note: first line of the school's anthem.)
- Sports: Football
- Football team: R.M.H.S
- Annual tuition: ₹8,300 (US$87) (Note: admission fees: ₹500 (US$5.20); monthly fees: ₹600 (US$6.30) and each term: ₹300 (US$3.10) as of 2022.)
- Revenue: ₹2,431,900 (US$25,000) (Note: calculation based on 293 students.)
- Graduates: 47 (2023)
- Affiliations: Goa Board of Secondary and Higher Secondary Education; Directorate of Education, Goa
- Last updated: 27 July 2023

Regina Martyrum High School is a private aided co-educational school located within the Assolna village in Salcete taluka of Goa. It is administered by the Diocesan Society of Education, Panjim. The school is associated with the Goa Board of Secondary and Higher Secondary Education and the Directorate of Education, Goa. It prepares students for Std. X (S.S.C) examination. The first batch of S.S.C students had appeared in March 1974.

== History ==
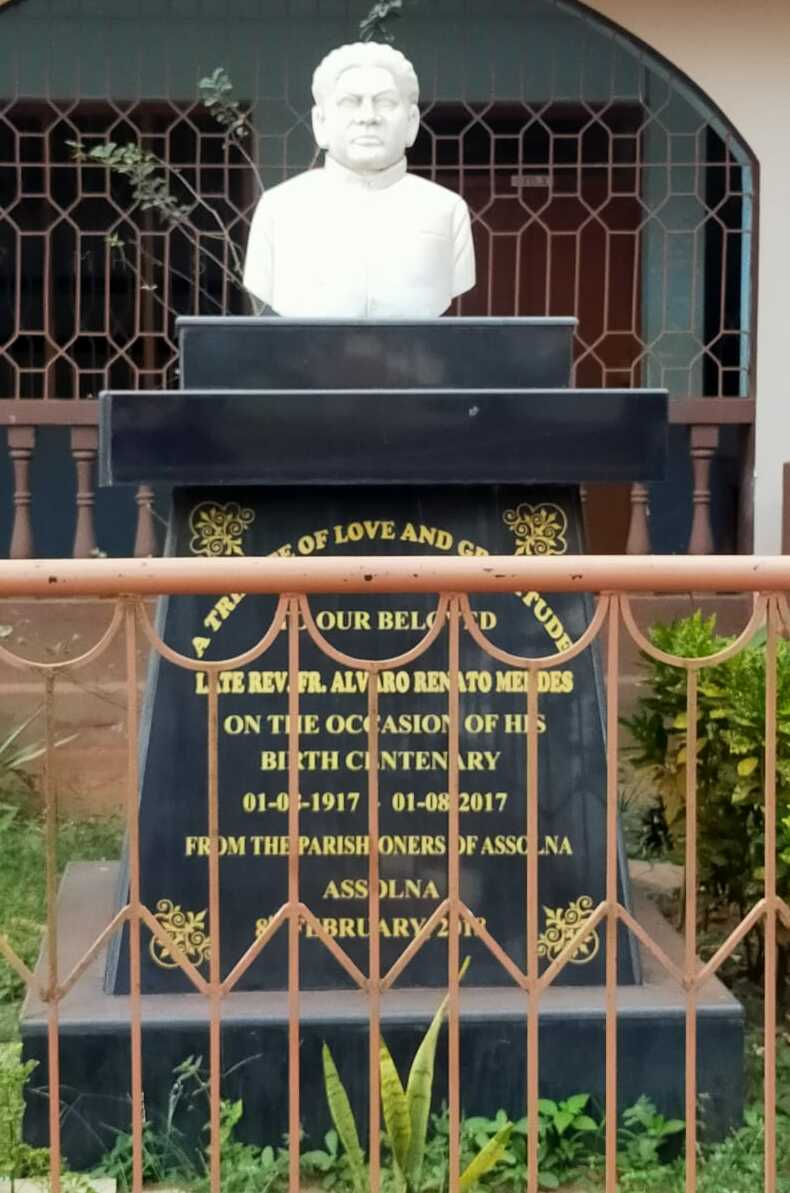
Fr. Alvaro Renato Mendes Memorial (former manager and parish priest) built by the parishioners of Assolna.

The school was founded in 1961 by the late Fr. Jose Martinho Rodrigues de Silva (the former vicar & manager) in an old building next to Our Lady of Martyrs Church, Assolna. (Note: also known as Regina Martyrum Church.) It is administered by the Diocesan Society of Education, Panjim, the society is a religious based minority institution registered under societies registration order on 29 August 1962 in the office of sub-registrar, Panjim under registration no. 107 and under the Societies Registration Act, 1860 under registration no. 466. It was later in 1989, the school shifted into a new school building with a community hall that was constructed by late Rev. Fr. Alvaro Renato Mendes.

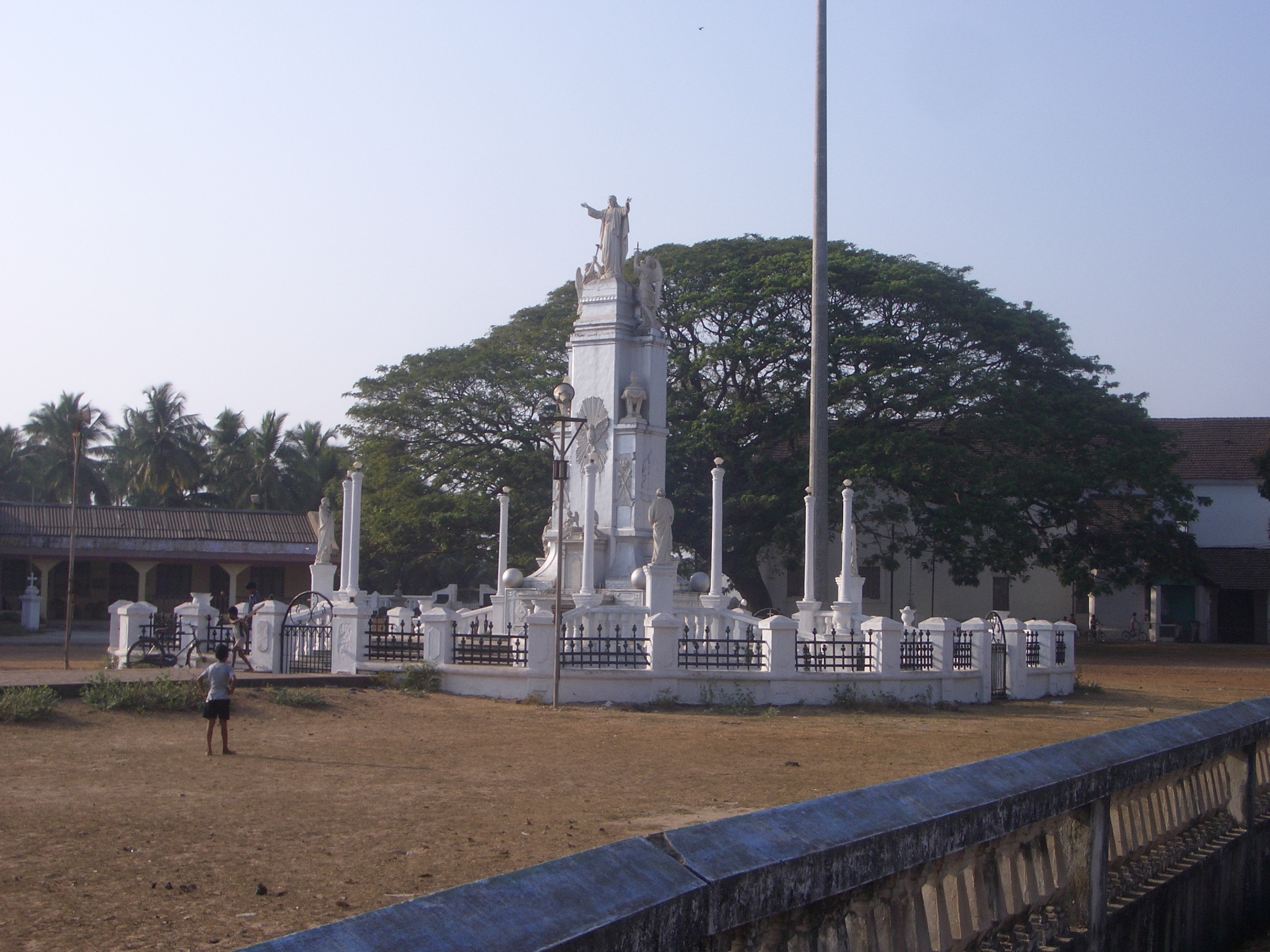
Christ the King monument located within the school premises (2006).

Later a library, sports room, pre-primary, computer lab, science lab and primary classrooms were constructed and inaugurated at the presence of Rev. Fr. Jose Agnelo Francisco dos Miliagres de Melo (former parish priest & manager) in 2007. Subsequently, an office, headmaster's room, manager's room and staff room were reconstructed along with the buffet hall that was attached to the existing school complex by Rev Fr. Lucio Alexander Dias (former parish priest & manager) in 2013. To reduce the burden of studies on pre-primary students, a park was constructed with slides, seesaws etc. by Fr. Lucio Dias in 2015.

== Key people ==
=== Managers ===
Ordinal	Officeholder	Term start	Term end	Time in office
1	Fr. Jose Martinho Rodrigues de Silva	29 August 1962	1 January 1973	10 years, 125 days (Note: also longest serving vicar of the Assolna church from 1949 to 1973; 23–24 years.)
2	Fr. Roberto Segismundo da Piedade Barreto	1 January 1973	1 January 1974	1 year (Note: Fr. Barretto was also the only manager to serve possibly less than or a year as the manager of the school.)
3	Fr. Julio Francisco Diogo Santana Fermino Fernandes	1 January 1974	1 January 1985	11 years (Note: also longest serving manager of the school.)
4	Fr. Alvaro Renato Mendes	1 January 1985	1 January 1993	8 years
5	Fr. Saude Taumaturgo Monteiro Pereira	1 January 1993	1 January 2000	7 years
6	Fr. Jose Agnelo Francisco dos Miliagres de Melo	1 January 2000	1 January 2008	8 years
7	Fr. Lucio Alexander Dias	1 June 2008	14 May 2015	6 years, 347 days
8	Fr. Micheal Fernandes	14 May 2015	5 May 2019	3 years, 356 days
9	Fr. Mansueto Fernandes (Note: Fr. Fernandes was the manager of the school until the arrival of Fr. Godinho, which resulted in his demotion.)	5 May 2019	11 May 2023	4 years, 6 days
	As primary manager	5 June 2023	incumbent	3 years, 6 days
10	Fr. Romeu Godinho	5 June 2023	incumbent	3 years, 6 days

=== Headmasters/Headmistress ===
Ordinal	Officeholder	Term start	Term end	Time in office
1	Sr. Maria Augusta (Note: Sr. Augusta was the only religious sister that served as the headmistress of the school.)	1962	1965	2–3 years
2	Alvaro Vieira	1965	1966	0–1 year
3	Lia Coelho	1966	1967	0–1 year
4	Luis Saldanha (Note: also the longest serving headmaster of the school.)	1967	1979	11–12 years
5	A. E. P Lourence	1979	1981	1–2 years
6	M. J. Joseph	1981	1982	0–1 year
7	Wilfred Lawrence	1982	1983	0–1 year
8	Rudolph M. D'Mello	1983	1985	1–2 years
9	Adelpo V. Afonso	1985	1988	2–3 years
10	Plotino Fernandes	1988	1994	5–6 years
11	Edward Coutinho	1994	1996	1–2 years
12	A. N Kamat (Note: Kamat was the only hindu headmaster that served in the school.)	1996	1998	1–2 years
13	Celina Monteiro	1998	2002	3–4 years
14	Bona D'Silva	2002	2011	8–9 years
15	Philomena Pires	2011	2015	3–4 years
16	Francisco Goes	2015	4 June 2022	6–7 years
17	Miriam Afonso	4 June 2022	incumbent	4 years, 7 days

== Sports ==
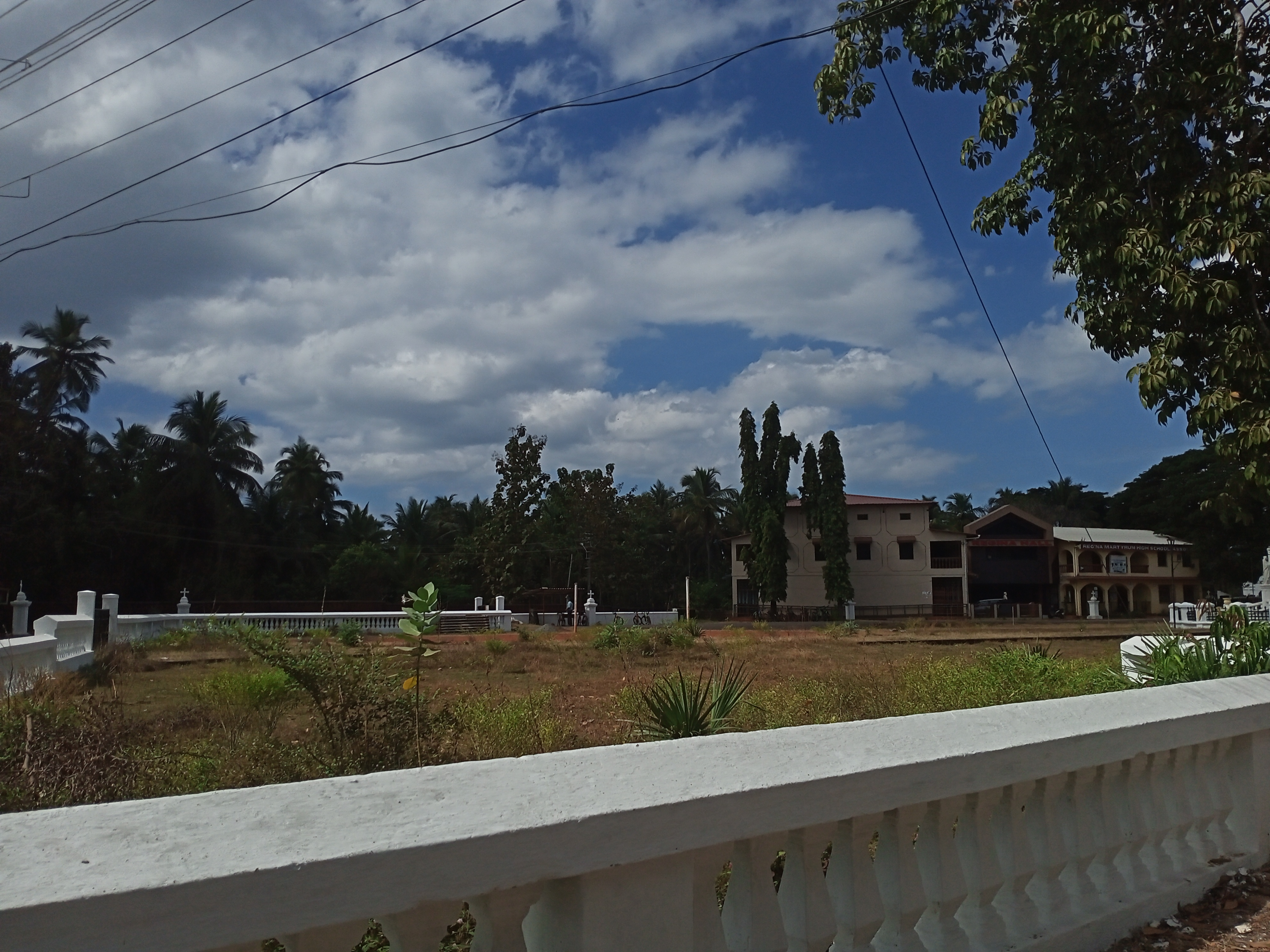
Playground view of the school from Assolna-Chinchinim road in 2020.

The school competes at inter-school, village clubs, taluka, state and national level football competitions. It was during the tenure of headmaster, Francisco Goes, the school has shown tremendous success on the field, under the guidance of Phys. ed. teacher, Angelo Silva. On 28 July 2016, Regina Martyrum High School defeated Auxilium High School by a 5–4 victory via a tiebreaker to qualify for the semi-finals of the U-14 Suborto Mukerjee Cup (Salcete Zone) football tournament, at artificial turf, Fatorda.

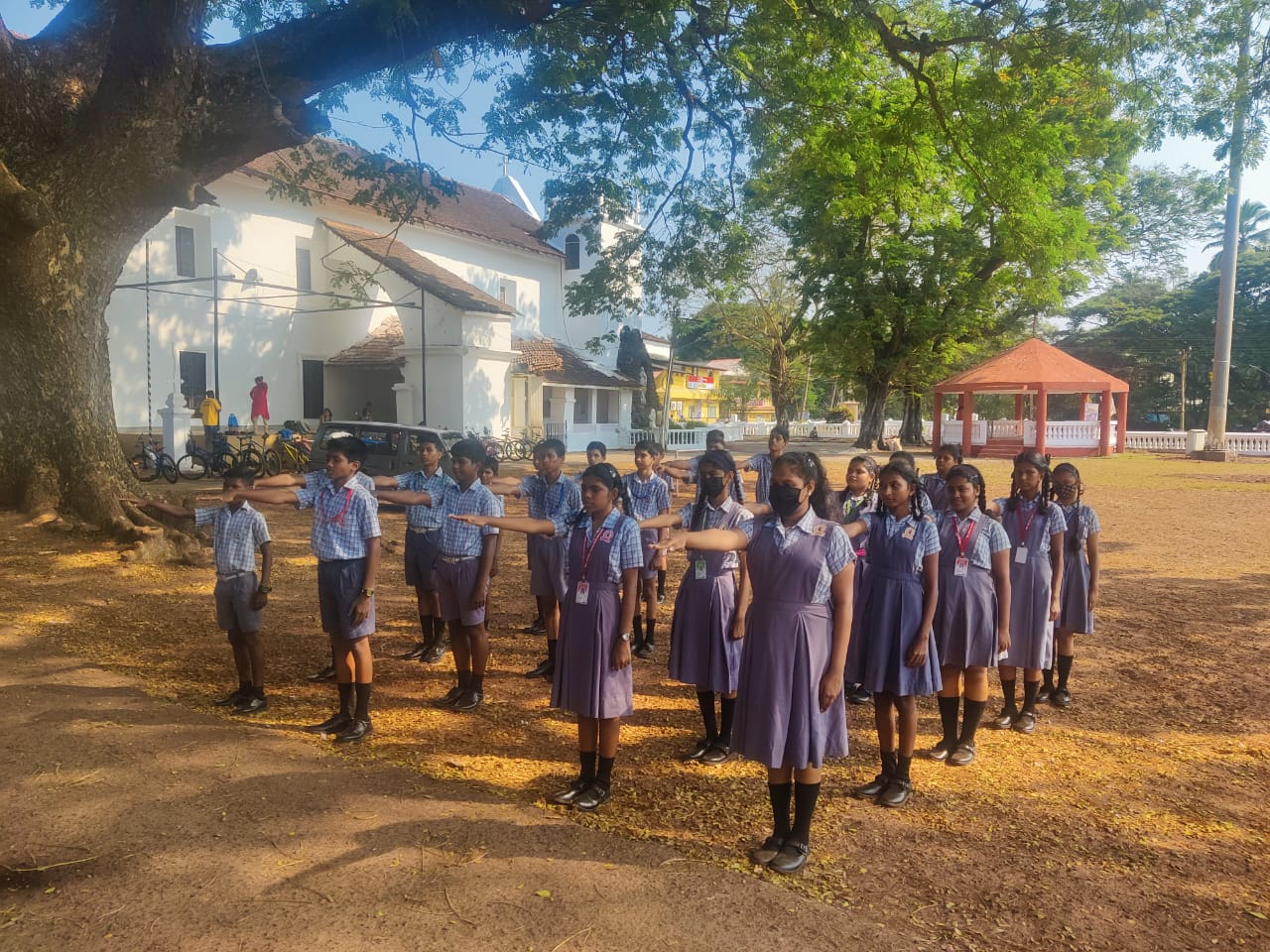
Std. IX students assembled after the cycling activity in October 2022

On 21 January 2017, Regina Martyrum High School U-14 football team made history by defeating Green Rosary High School, Dona Paula by a 4–2 victory to be declared as the state champions for the first time.

On 6 January 2018, Regina Martyrum High School defeated St. Thomas High School, Cansaulim by a 2–1 victory to qualify in the quarter-finals of the St. Joseph Vaz Soccer Cup which was organised by Mount Mary's High School, Chinchinim at Our Lady of Hope Church ground, Chinchinim.

On 26 January 2018, Regina Martyrum High School beat Rosary High School, Navelim by a 3–1 victory via the tie-breaker to win the 1st Teacher Dolorosa Memorial U-17 Girls football tournament which was organised by Chandor Club, held at Chandor ground.

On 5 July 2018, Regina Martyrum High School, Assolna knocked out St Mary's High School, Varca by a 2–1 victory to qualify in the next round of the U-17 Suborto Mukherjee Salcete Taluka football tournament organised by DSYA, at Astro Turf ground, Fatorda.

On 26 July 2018, Regina Martyrum High School, Assolna knocked out Fatima Convent High School, Margao by a 6–1 victory to move into the semi-finals of the U-17 Subroto Mukherjee Salcete Taluka girls football tournament which was organised by DSYA, at Pandit Jawaharlal Nehru Stadium, Fatorda. On 29 July 2018, Regina Martyrum High School defeated Rosary Higher Secondary School, Navelim by a 2–0 victory to win the U-17 girls Salcete taluka Subroto Mukherjee football tournament which was organised by DSYA at Pandit Jawaharlal Nehru Stadium.

On 25 June 2019, Regina Martyrum High School beat Our Lady of Rosary High School, Fatorda by a 5–4 victory via the tie-breaker to win the UCV Inter-School Cup organized by the Union of Chinchinim Villagers, at Church ground, Chinchinim.

On 25 July 2019, Regina Martyrum High School defeated Bethany Convent High School, Sao Jose de Areal by a 5–4 victory via the tie-breaker to move into the quarter-finals of the 2nd Ramnath D. Volvotkar memorial inter-school football tournament which was organised by “Insight” The Society for Sports, Culture, Youth Affairs & Charity of Gudi Paroda, at the Gudi–Paroda ground. On 20 August 2019, Regina Martyrum High School defeated Our Lady Mother of Poor High School, Tilamol to qualify in the semi-finals of the late Ramnath D. Volvotkar Memorial 2nd All Goa inter-school U-17 boys football tournament which was organised by “Insight” the Society for Sports, Culture, Youth Affairs & Charity, at Gudi-Paroda ground.

On 23 August 2019, Regina Martyrum High School were qualified to play the finals with Our Lady of Succour High School, Nagoa-Verna of the late Ramnath D. Volvotkar Memorial 2nd all Goa inter-school U-17 boys football tournament, which was organised by "Insight" the Society for Sports, Culture, Youth Affairs & Charity of Gudi at Paroda ground, the finals were held on 24 August 2019. In the first semi-finals of the tournament, Regina Martyrum High School beat Rosary High School, Navelim 4-3 via the tie-breaker.

On 7 January 2020, Regina Martyrum High School defeated Bethany Convent High School, Sao Jose de Areal by a 3–1 victory to move ahead in the quarter-finals of the St. Joseph Vaz Soccer Cup which was organised by Mount Mary's Educational Complex, Chinchinim at Our Lady of Hope Church ground, Chinchinim.

On 16 July 2022, Regina Martyrum High School along with four other schools including Loyola High School qualified to move ahead in the U-14 Subroto Mukherjee inter-school salcete taluka football tournament which was organised by DSYA at village school ground, Dramapur. The school's qualification came after a 3–0 win against Our Lady of Rosary High School, Fatorda.

== Cultural activities ==
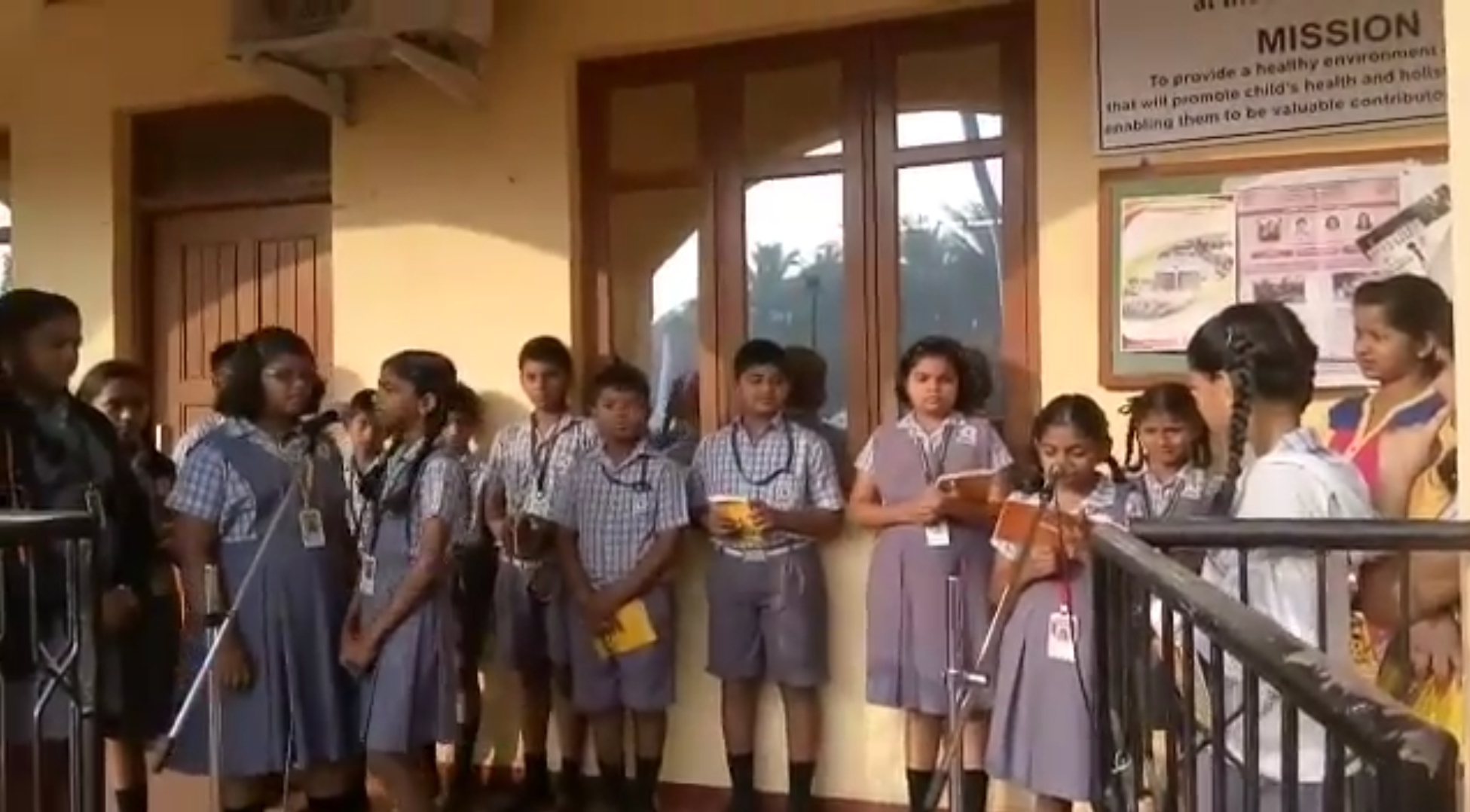
Std. V students showcasing Sanskrit language and its meanings in 2018

On 1 July 2022, the school celebrated the São Jão festival. The festival began with a prayer service, followed by a skit titled, A Journey with John the Baptist. Next a flower crown (Konkani: kopel) making contest was organised for the primary and secondary students. The pre-primary teachers along with the students organised a game showcasing local fruits for São Jão. Further, the Parent-Teacher Association executive members prepared and served traditional a Goan sweet (Konkani: attol) on a banana. Later a traditional sweet dish making contest was organised for the parents. The judges for the contest were Neeraj Aguiar, Alvaro Velose and Sanzilan Aguiar from the Nusi Maritime Academy, Assolna. The competition was participated by around 49 parents.

== Waste management ==
The school has also showcased their initiative in waste management during the tenure of headmaster, Francisco Goes, by the participation of the school's Parent-teacher association (PTA), teachers and students. On 20 July 2016, the teachers and students of Regina Martyrum High School along with six other schools demonstrated their enterprise in waste management through powerpoint presentations in the presence of then Minister of Environment, Rajendra Arlekar. They highlighted new suggestions which could be implemented by the younger generation to solve the waste management issue.

On 7 April 2018, a waste management workshop was held at Regina Martyrum High School to highlight the issues of the rise in air pollution caused by the indiscriminate burning of plastic waste and increased contamination and depletion of natural water resources due to waste dumping. The workshop was jointly organised by the school's (PTA) and the Assolna village panchayat. It also included live demonstration of an organic waste converter (OWC) as well as solar cookers that were used to bake sweet potatoes.

The organisers deliberated upon various safe garbage disposal methods to be undertaken by the locals, they also requested support from the Government of Goa to avow plastic into fuel through the process of pyrolysis. The students of Regina Martyrum High School from Std. V to Std. VII were also given an audio-visual presentation on the proper method of disposing garbage.

On 10 January 2020, the teachers and students of Regina Martyrum High school were among the 15 schools including St. Xavier's High School that attended the first edition of Olive Ridley Festival Creative organised by SaxttiKids School, Carmona which was conceptualised and created to emphasize the philosophy of SaxttiKids, to be "environment-friendly". The festival concentrated on recycling materials like carton cardboards, used wrapping paper, CDs, waste cloth, pebbles, coconut shoots and ice-creams tubs to craft Christmas decorations. Various niche crafting modules were devised to bring in the festive vibe of Christmas as well as brush up children’s learning and creative skills.

== Robotics ==
On 8 December 2015, Regina Martyrum High School was among the 11 schools in the state selected to have a robotics lab installed within their premises. The Science and Technology Department was responsible for adding the robotics labs, which functioned on a pilot basis. Under this scheme for the promotion of information technology and science, the schools received an annual fund of ₹50,000 (equivalent to ₹75,000 or US$790 in 2023) towards infrastructure, training, projects, and contests.

== 2023 theft ==
In October 2023, an incident occurred where unidentified individuals vandalized the locks on the gate and doors located at the rear side of the school. During the incident, a sum of Rs ₹2.95 lakh (US$3,100) in cash, intended for student uniforms, was stolen, along with two DVRs valued at approximately ₹40,000 (US$420). The local authorities, upon investigation, confirmed the total value of the stolen items to be ₹3.35 lakh (US$3,500).

In response to the incident, a formal complaint was filed by Miriam Afonso, the headmistress of the school, with the Cuncolim police. The complaint stated that unidentified individuals gained unauthorized access to the school premises between 2:45 pm on October 10 and 6:45 am on October 11. The officer in charge of the Cuncolim police station, PI Diego Gracias, confirmed that a First Information Report (FIR) had been filed against the unknown perpetrators under Sections 454, 457, and 380 of the Indian Penal Code (IPC).

On 11 October 2023, in response to the theft incident at the school prompted the residents of Assolna, along with the local Member of the Legislative Assembly (MLA) Cruz Silva, advocated for the establishment of a dedicated police station in the area. They expressed dissatisfaction with the existing police outpost, which they believed was unable to effectively meet the needs of the local community. To their surprise and dismay, both the residents and the MLA discovered that the Cuncolim police, responsible for a large jurisdiction, possessed only one vehicle. This limited mobility and hindered the prompt response of personnel in emergency scenarios.

Silva expressed concerns about the inadequate staffing levels at the Cuncolim police station. He emphasized that the station required a minimum of 20 additional police personnel. Silva had previously raised this issue after being elected as the Velim MLA, but little progress had been made since then. He further highlighted the need for a separate police station in Assolna, suggesting that the existing police outpost in Velim is ineffective due to insufficient manpower and logistical support. Silva called for the division of the Cuncolim police station into separate entities, namely Cuncolim and Assolna, with the Assolna police outpost being upgraded to a full-fledged police station.

== Faculty awards ==
On 17 February 2017, Francisco Goes, along with six other teachers from other Catholic schools, was felicitated by the Archbishop of Goa and Daman, Filipe Neri Ferrão, for over 30 years of service at the All Goa Catholic Educational Institutions Day, which was celebrated at Kala Academy.

On 30 October 2018, the Canon Antimo Gomes annual award (Note: the winners were also given ₹5,000 (equivalent to ₹6,700 or US$70 in 2023) each.) for Diocesan Society of Education was presented to Angelo Silva, the physical education teacher of Regina Martyrum High School along with three other teachers from different schools.

== Notable alumni ==
- Romeo Fernandes, Indian association football player

== See also ==
- List of schools in Goa
- Education in Goa
