= Assolna =

Assolna Osollnnem
- Village
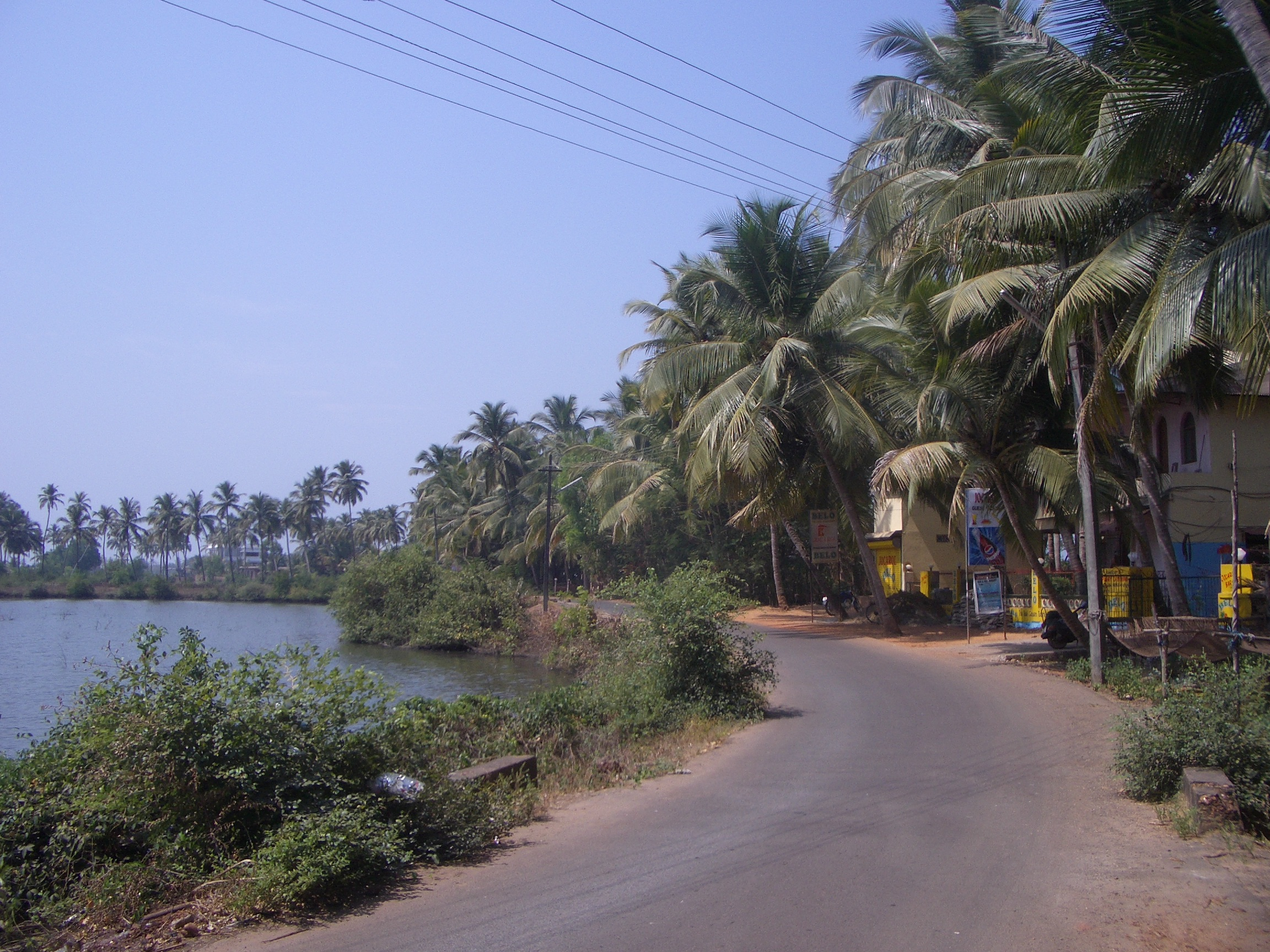
- Rural landscape of Assolna, 2006

- Location in Goa, India Assolna (India)
- Coordinates: 15.18°N 73.97°E
- Country: India
- State: Goa
- District: South Goa
- Sub-district: Salcete
- Elevation: 10 m (33 ft)

Population (2011)
  - Total: 3 410

Languages
  - Official: Konkani
- Time zone: UTC+5:30 (IST)
- PIN: 403701

Assolna (Osollnnem) is a village in the Salcete taluka of South Goa district, in the state of Goa, India. It is known for restaurants, the small traditional market, and local institutions. The Sal river flows through this village.

== Geography ==
Assolna is located at 15.18°N 73.97°E. It has an average elevation of 10 m (33 ft).

Assolna is 11 km from Margao, the main South Goa district headquarters town. It is 13.9 km away from Quepem and Curtorim village is 22.1 km away.

In its environs are Chinchinim (4.6 km away), Velim (3 km), Ambelim (3 km), Cuncolim (2.4 km), and Cavelossim. Assolna nestles between these villages. It is locally administered by a village panchayat, whose building was inaugurated in October 1984.

== Population ==
As per the 2011 Census, it had a population of 3410 persons, in 891 homes. There were 1669 men and 1741 women. Its literate population was 2923 persons.

== Etymology ==
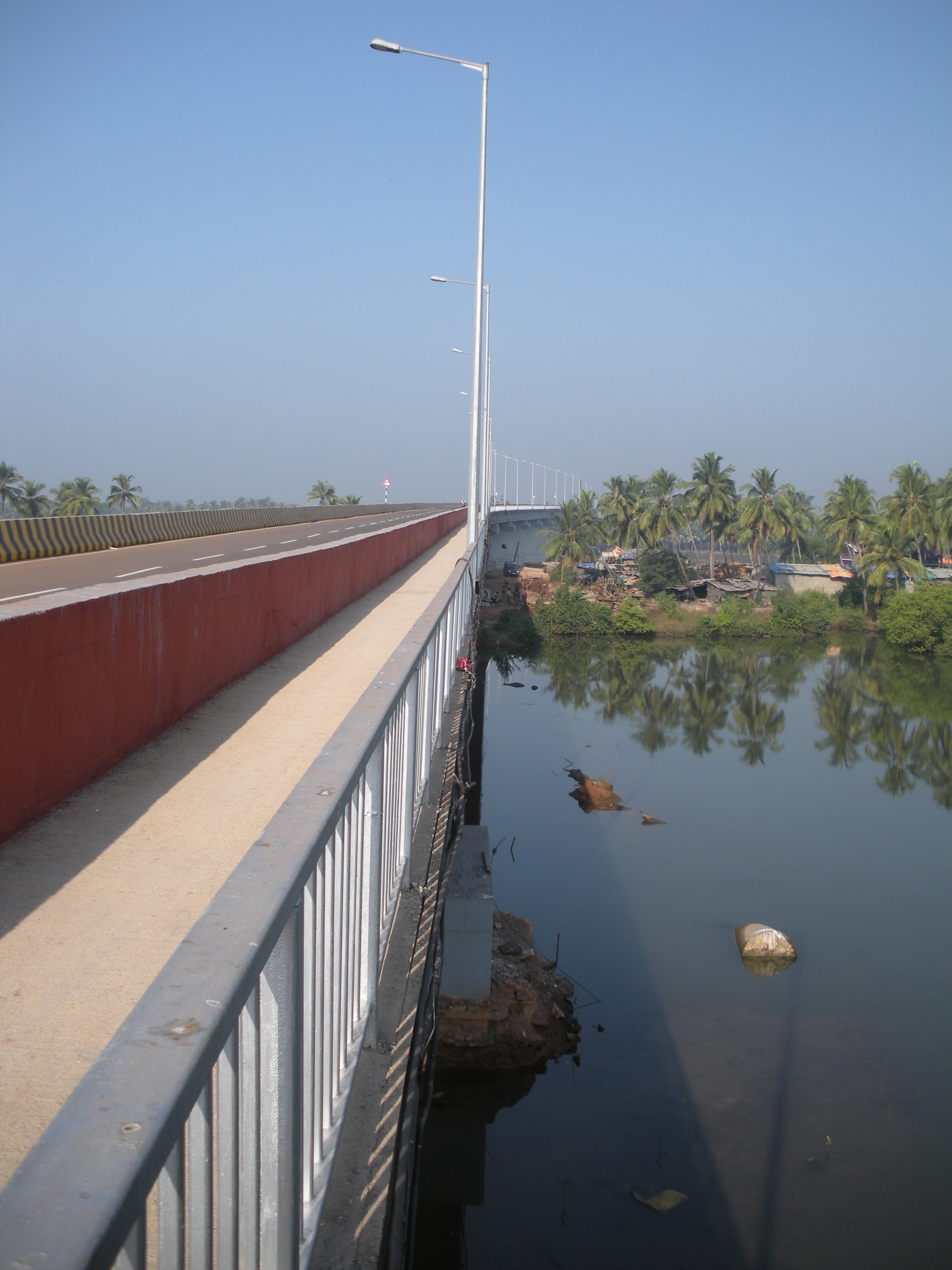
Assolna bridge

Folklore traces the other name of the village of Assolna, as “Oslem-na”, according to Bennett Paes. That in vernacular Konkani translates as “There’s nothing like it”. Be it fantasy or fact, what substantiates the significance of that sobriquet are the following events of the past.

== On the banks of the River Sal ==
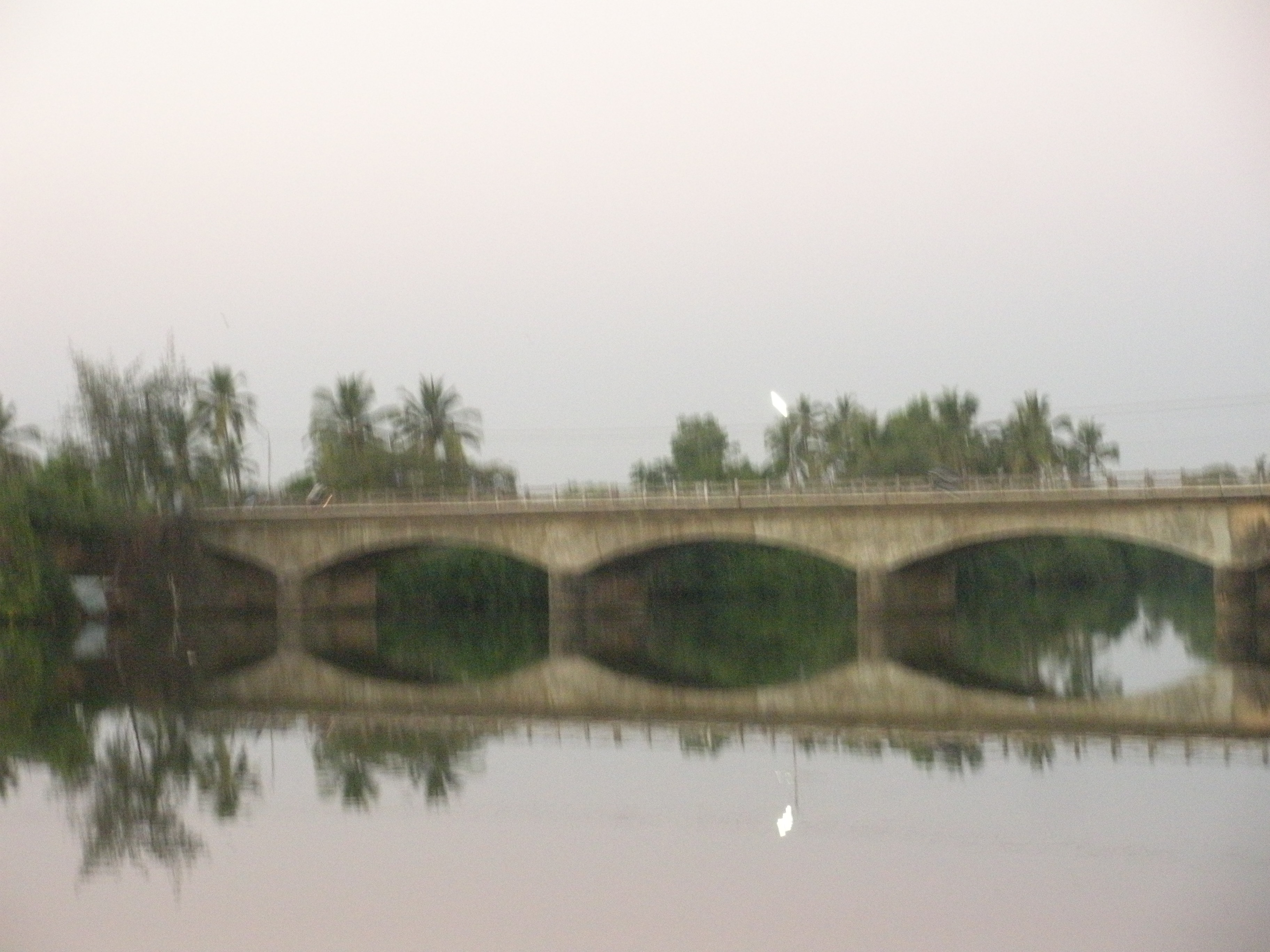
Sal river, Assolna

Here is a translated portion from Portuguese, of what the Portuguese Administrator, residing in Assolna in the 1890s wrote:

Besides the capital city of Nova Goa and a few other administrative places, there is no other town in Portuguese India of greater importance than Assolna. It is a seat of Civic Administration. The main reason is that, being situated on the bank of river Sal, it serves as a commercial centre and a docking point for domestic ships carrying on coastal trade as far as Bombay to the north.

== Market area ==
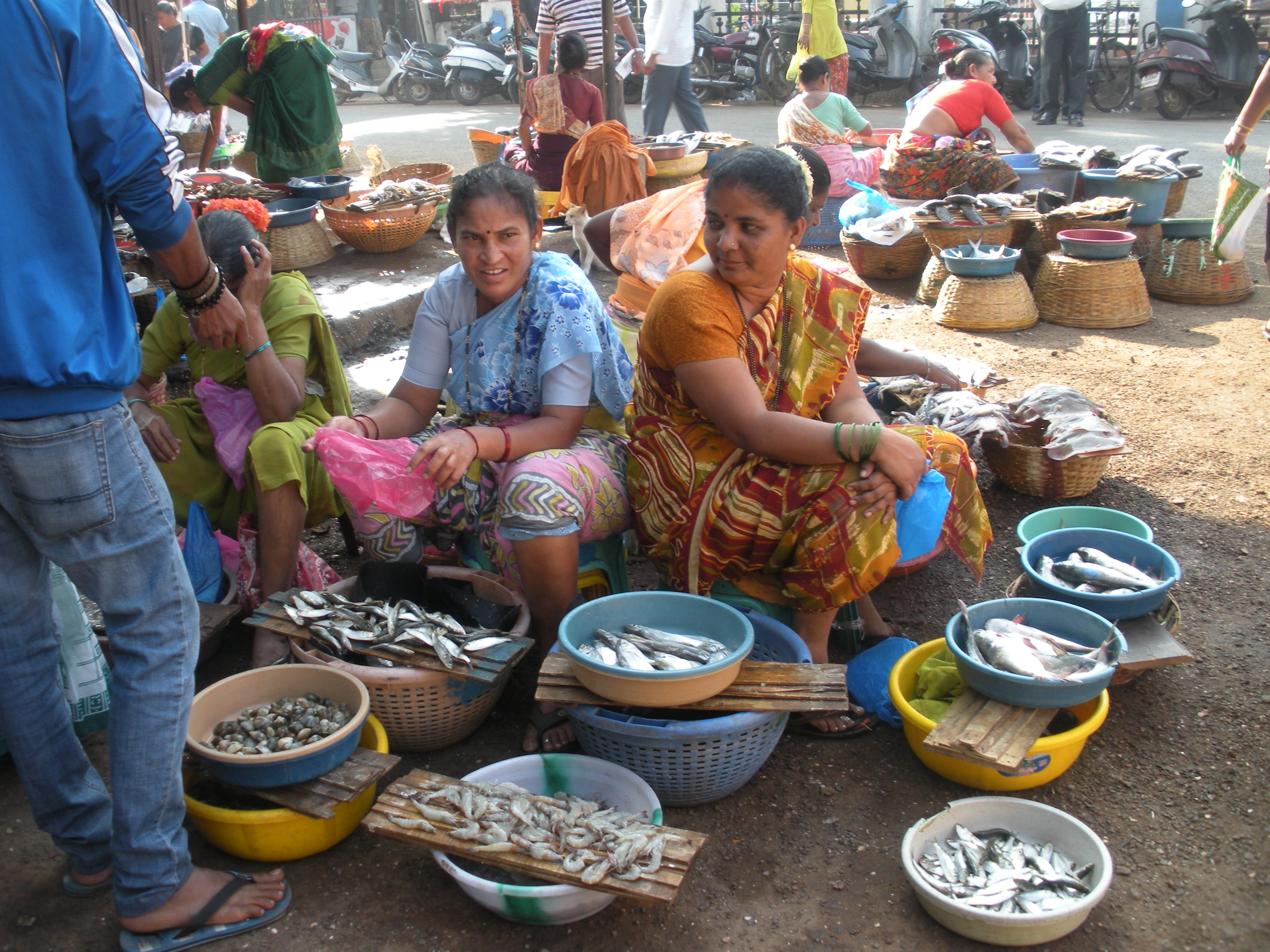
Assolna bazar (tinto), including the fish-market.

The commercial aspect of the village is well manifested in the shape of its market area, specifically designed in the shape of a square with shopping and service outlets on all sides, and a main road in between, leading over the bridge to the capital, Panjim, in the north, to Cabo de Rama fort in the south; and branching out to the interiors of south Goa in the east and finally, over another bridge to the sea side in the west.

== Neighbouring conflict ==
The captain-major in charge of the Portuguese Army garrison at the (now extinct) Assolna Fort was determined to punish the culprits responsible for the deaths of the victims of the Cuncolim Massacre. Hence the Portuguese army raided and destroyed orchards and fields surrounding the village.

The Hindu Kshatriya chieftains of Cuncolim, who had led the massacre, were then summoned to the Assolna fort situated on the banks of the River Sal. (The Church of Regina Martyrum, built in memory of the martyred Christians, now stands at this location.) Charged with treason, sixteen of them were sentenced to death by the Portuguese authorities. One escaped execution by jumping into the Assolna River through a toilet hole and fleeing to distant Karwar.

Following the execution of their leaders, the Hindu landlords of neighbouring villages (including Assolna) refused to pay taxes on the produce generated from their fields and orchards to the Portuguese government. As a result, their lands were confiscated and entrusted to the Condado of the Marquis of Fronteira. The majority of the ordinary villagers also converted to Christianity in the years following the massacre.

== Village church ==
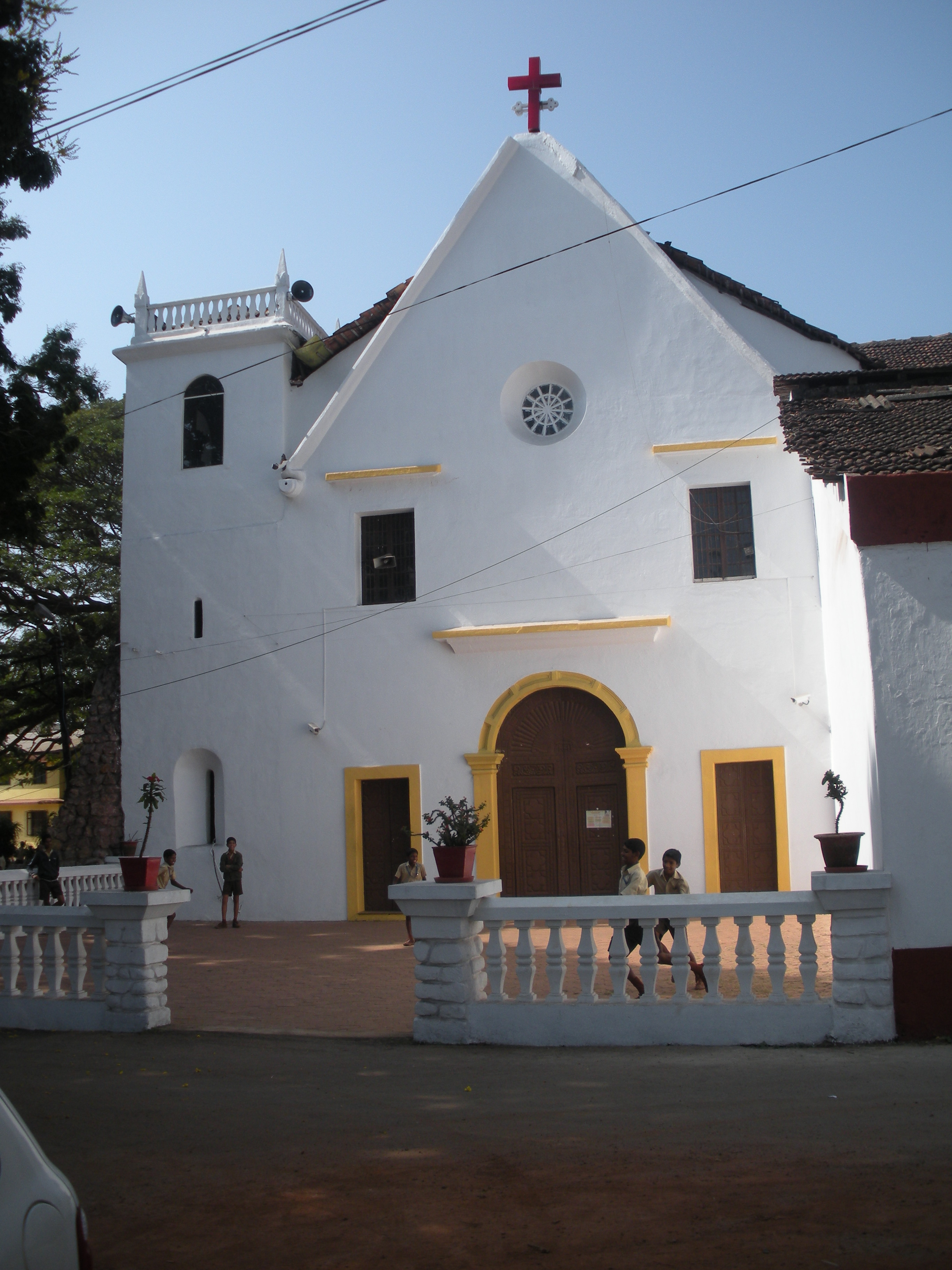
Regina Martyrum Church

The Regina Martyrum Church of Assolna, which celebrated its 400th anniversary in 2016, is the only Catholic church in Goa that was built on the remains of a military fort.

Its main church feast is celebrated in November. There are other smaller feasts too. The zagor is celebrated by the Christian fishing community. A sangodd festival to honour Saint Peter is also celebrated.

== Cristo Rei monument ==
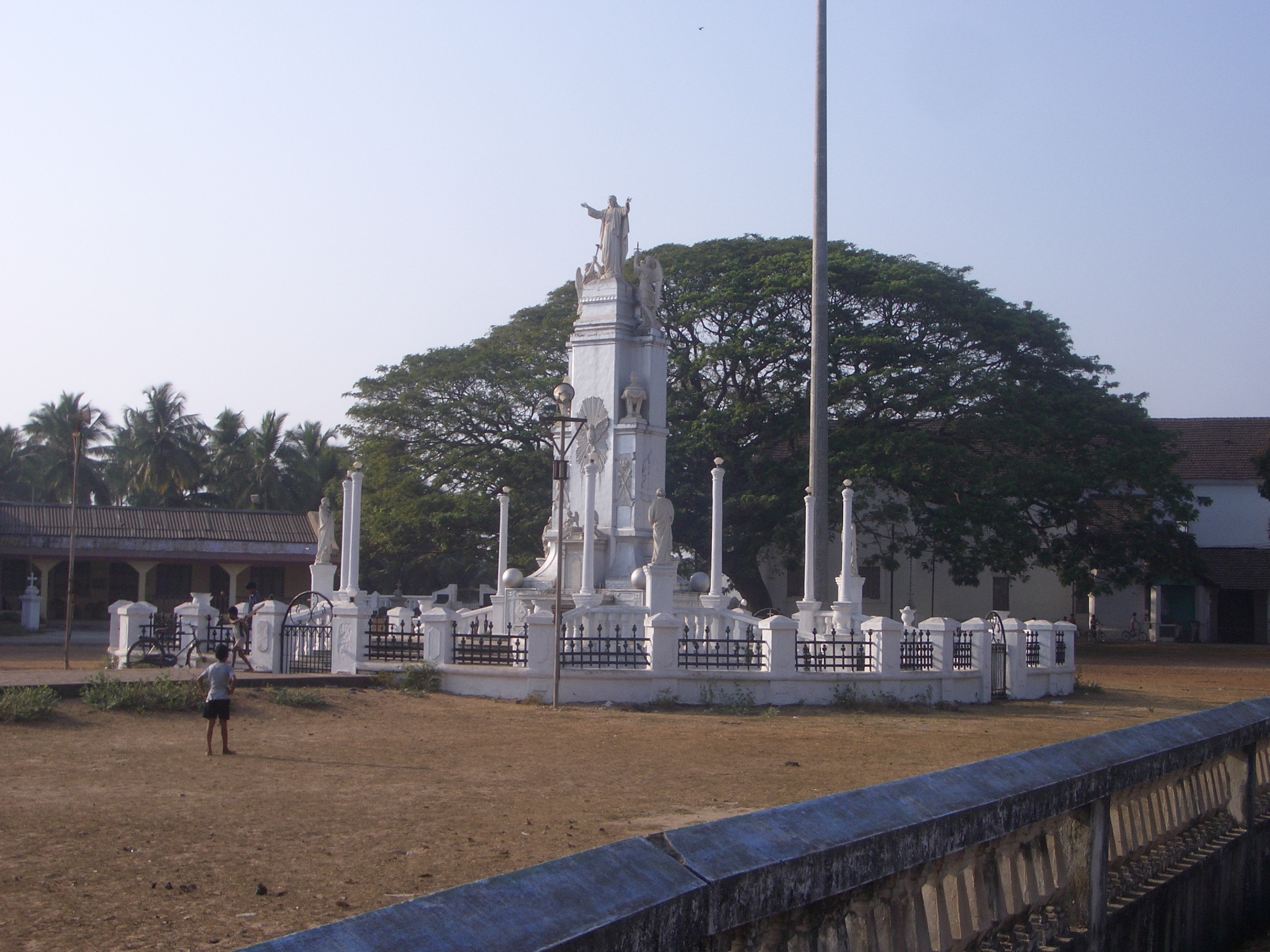
Cristo Rei monument

This monument to Christ was built and blessed in the year 1934. It depicts a Biblical theme, with the statue of Christ rising tall in the company of angels and four of his apostles.

== Other landmarks and notable spots ==
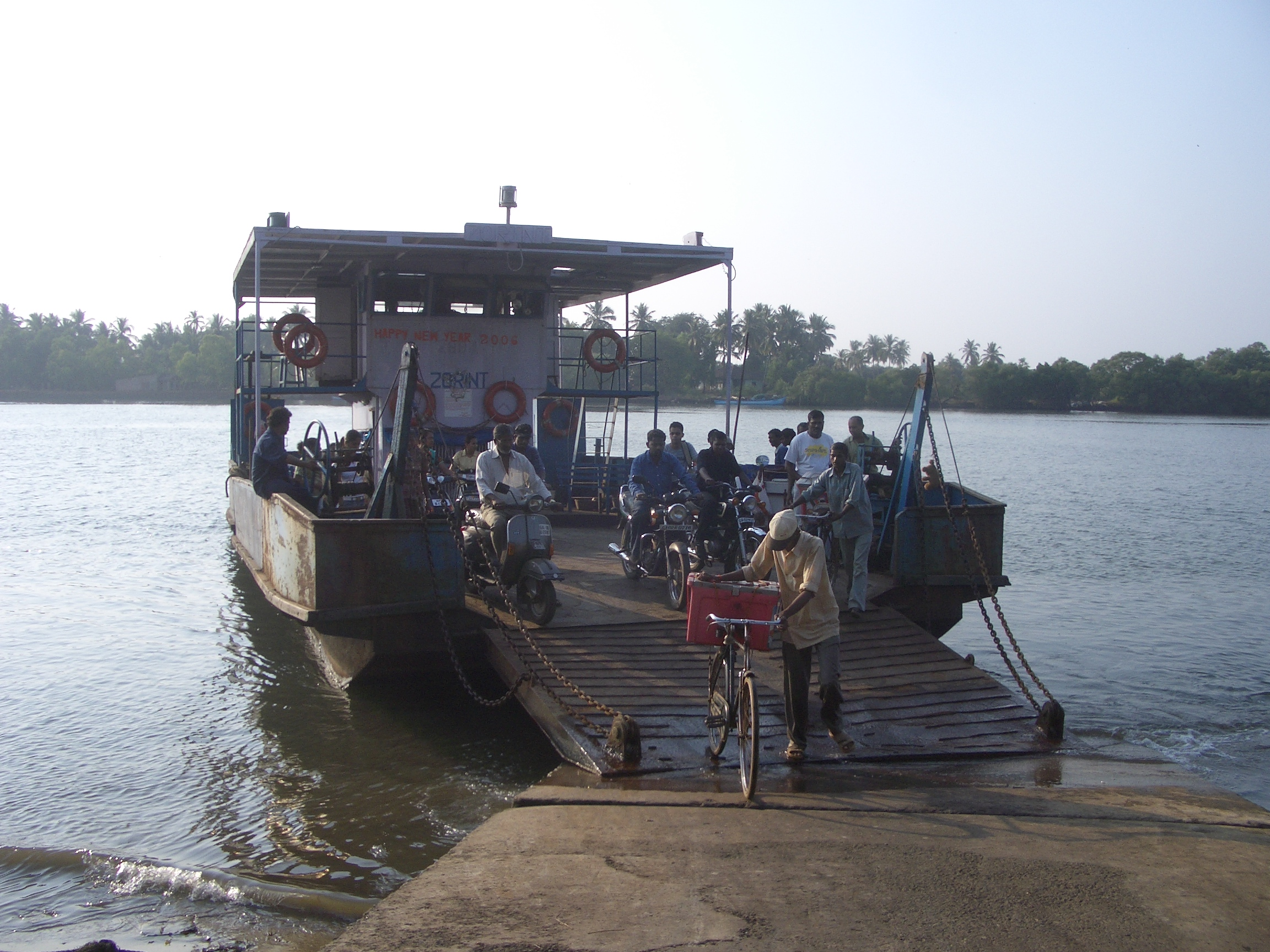
Cavelossim-Assolna ferry

There is a sports ground at the Bainaku vaddo. A children's park has been set up in 2013.

Among the palatial homes are the Solar dos Monteiros and the Menezes Mansion.

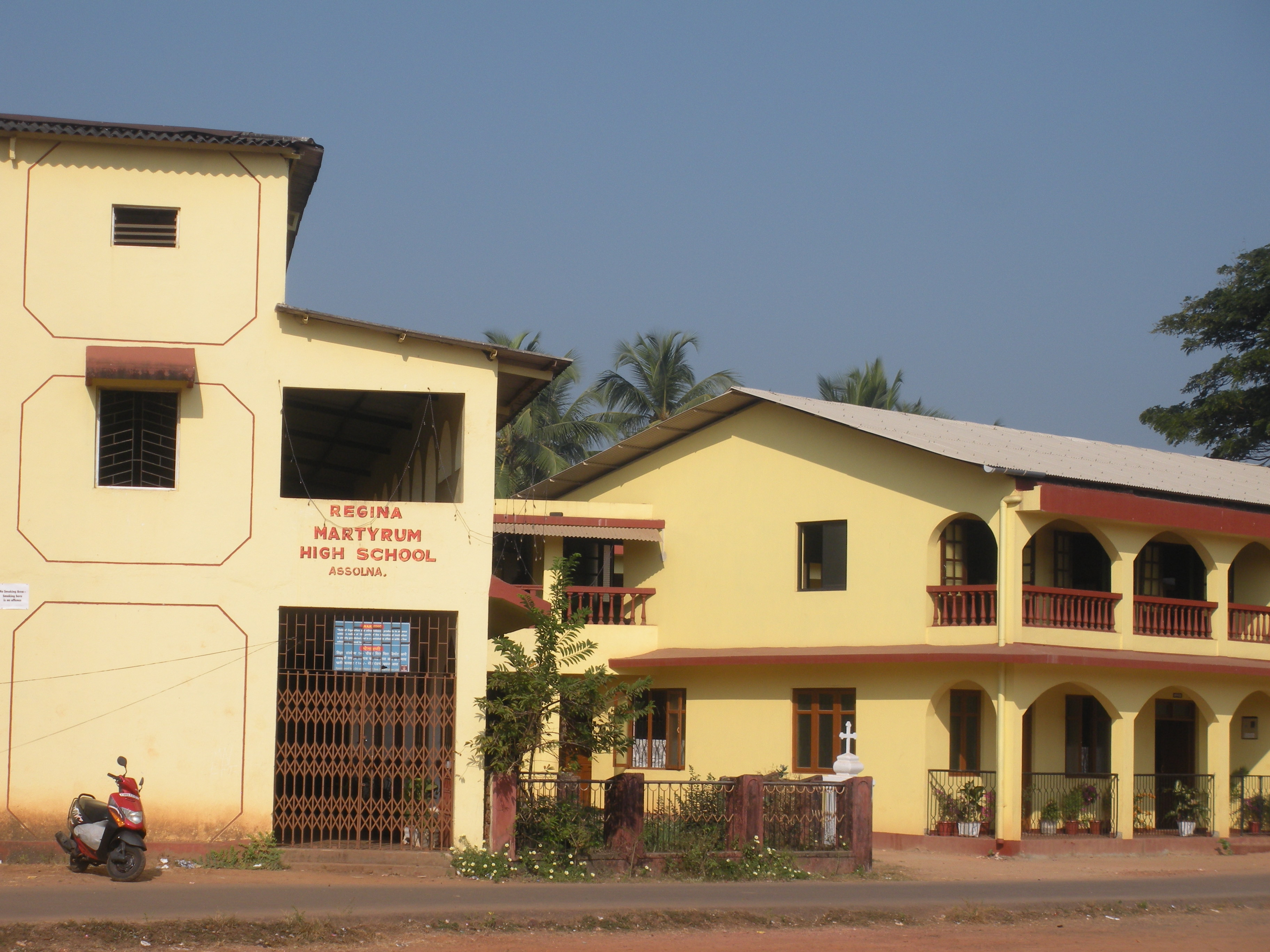
Regina Martyrum high school, Assolna

Schools in the village include Regina Martyrum High School, St Anthony's High School (closed in 2003), an English medium school, and a Marathi primary too.

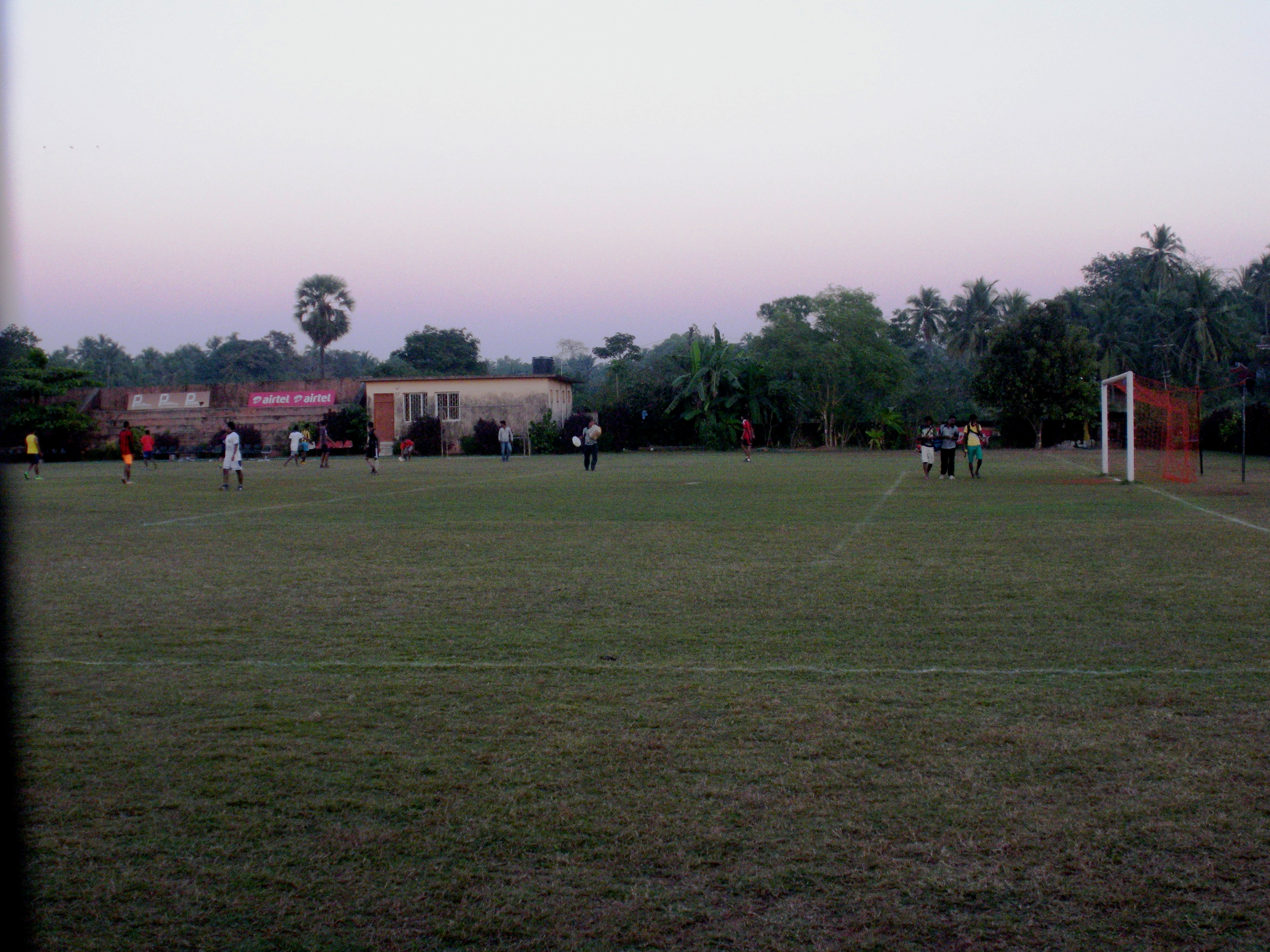
Playgroupd at Bainaku vaddo.

Among Assolna's famous sons was the freedom fighter Dr Juliao Menezes (1909). Its ferry has been a prominent and scenic route for locals and visitors (including tourists) alike.

Like other villages in Goa, Assolna too has its village administration looked after by a panchayat. The panchayat has an online presence at http://vpassolna.com/ This institution issues some certificates, licences and permissions, and no-objection certificates, according to its website.

== Book on Assolna ==
Prof. Jose Juliao S Almeida wrote Aldeia de Assolna, a book in Portuguese about Assolna in the 19th century and further back in time. The village features in the fictional work Liberation -- A Novel by Jorge Ataide-Lobo, published in the early 1970s and printed at Casa J.D. Fernandes (Panjim).
