= Antonette Mendes =

Indian singer and actress (1944–2024)

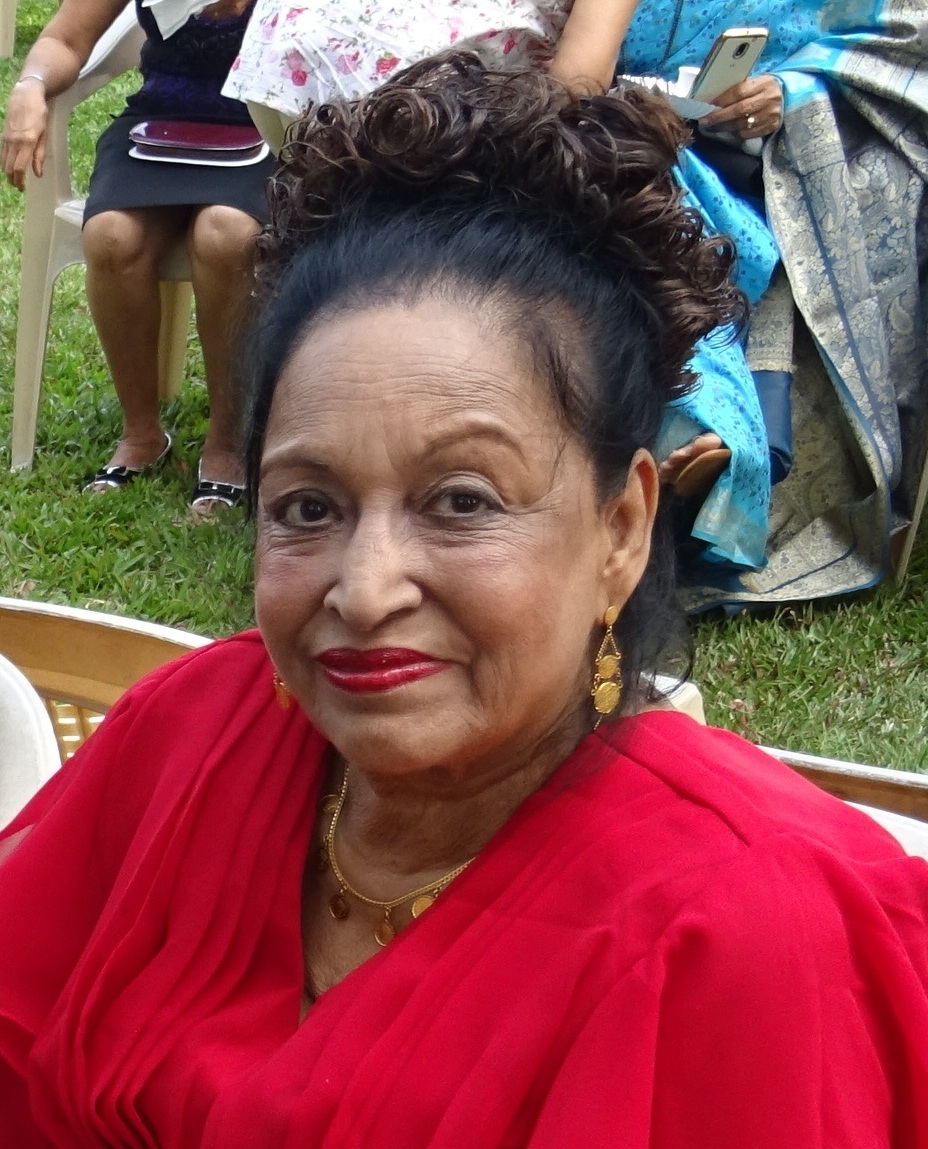
- Mendes at the Kala Academy, 2017
- Born: Maria Antonia D'Souza; 10 May 1944; Bombay, British India
- Died: 7 April 2024 (aged 79); Bandra, Mumbai, Maharashtra, India
- Occupations: Singer; actress; playwright; director
- Years active: 1960–2010s
- Notable work: Amchem Noxib; Nirmon; Mohabbat Zindagi Hai
- Spouse: Romeo Mendes (m. 1966; died 1999)
- Children: 3
- Father: A. K. D'Souza
- Relatives: Fatima D'Souza (sister); Anil Kumar (brother-in-law); Jose Rod (son-in-law)
- Awards: TAG's "Lifetime Contribution to Tiatr Award" (2009)
- Website: facebook.com/antonette.mendes.7

Antonette Mendes (born Maria Antonia D'Souza; 10 May 1944 – 7 April 2024) was an Indian singer, actress, playwright, and theatre director known for her work in Konkani films and tiatr productions. Referred to as the "Melody Queen", she was known as the "queen of the Konkani stage", prior to Lorna Cordeiro's emergence in the Konkani music scene.

== Early life ==
Antonette Mendes, originally named Maria Antonia D'Souza, was born on 10 May 1944, in Princess Street, Chira Bazaar, Bombay, which was part of the Bombay Presidency during British India (now Mumbai, Maharashtra). Her father, A. K. D'Souza, was a sailor, as well as a known figure in the theatrical realm, as an actor, director, and writer. Her mother, Innocencia D'Souza, fulfilled the role of a homemaker within the family.

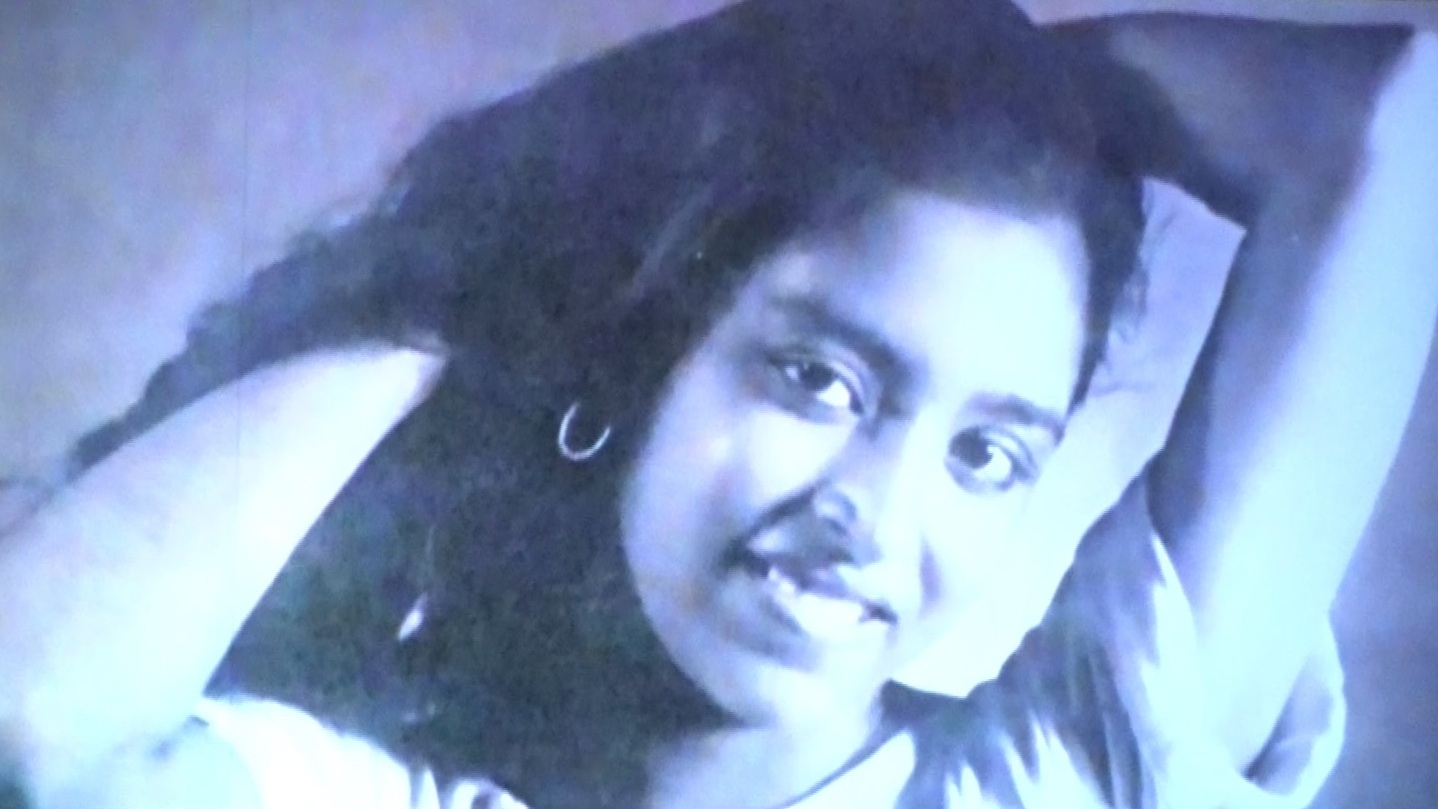
Mendes during her youth, 1960s

As the eldest child, Mendes displayed a deep love for music and actively engaged in a variety of co-curricular pursuits during her schooling years. She had a brother Joaquim, and a sister named Fatima, who has made a name for herself as a Konkani actress. Their father enjoyed a close professional relationship with prominent figures in the dramatic arts, such as Minguel Rod and the trio Kid-Young-Rod (Kid Boxer, Young Menezes, and Minguel Rod).

== Career ==
=== Hanv To Tarvotti and directorial debut (1960–1970s) ===
Mendes commenced her stage career as a vocalist at the age of 15, making her debut in her father's tiatr production titled Hanv To Tarvotti (It's me, the Seaman) at the Princess Theatre in Bhangwadi. Her father, A. K. D'Souza, a modest writer and director of Konkani tiatrs during that era, regularly orchestrated the production of these theatrical works. This early exposure led Mendes to partake in the tiatr Fuddar (Future), helmed by the Konkani playwright Kid Boxer, which was performed in Bombay and Goa. This significant opportunity served as a turning point in D'Souza's career, subsequently affording her the prospect of embarking on a journey to East Africa, where she showcased her talents in three tiatrs: Kid Boxer's Bancruttam Bancrutt, as well as Fuddar (Future) and Alfred Rose's Dotor Advogad (Doctor Advocate).

Shortly thereafter, Mendes ventured into the realm of directing, marking her directorial debut with her father's tiatr Dilolo Jurament. She continued to expand her creative horizons by writing and directing her own tiatrs, including productions such as Obgath, Tum Saiba Konn, and Don Ghoram (Two Houses). Her abilities paved the way for her participation in Chris Perry's seminal musical show in Bahrain in 1978, as well as her involvement in Rico Rod's tiatr Bailek Lagon in Kuwait. Additionally, Mendes embarked on extensive tours alongside various tiatr troupes, across East Africa, Canada, Germany, United Kingdom, United Arab Emirates, Oman, and Qatar. Initially acclaimed for her vocal prowess, Mendes subsequently garnered admiration for her portrayal of compelling character roles as an actress. Her memorable contributions encompassed not only her acclaimed songs released by His Master's Voice but also her appearances in M. Boyer's tiatrs. Wilson Mazarello writes, "Mendes' performances drew numerous tiatr aficionados, who were enticed by the mellifluous quality of her voice and the heartfelt manner in which she delivered her renditions." Over the course of her career, Mendes had the privilege of collaborating with directors, including J. P. Souzalin, Kid Boxer, Master Vaz, C. Alvares, Prem Kumar, Alfred Rose, M. Boyer, Remmie Colaço, Joe Rose, Jacinto Vaz, Bab Peter, Rosario Rodrigues, Mendes Brothers, Anil Kumar, Titta Pretto, H. Britton, Paul Romy, and various others. These performances garnered her recognition and acclaim.

=== Association with M. Boyer and Konkani cinema ===
Mendes holds the distinction of being one of the longest-serving cast under M. Boyer's tutelage. Her association with Boyer commenced with the tiatr production titled Besanv (Blessing), marking the beginning of a long and fruitful collaboration. Known for his exacting standards, Mendes fondly recalled Boyer's commitment to perfection in both singing and acting. Throughout her career, Mendes delivered memorable performances, but it is her portrayal in Mauli (Gardener), a non-stop tiatr written and directed by her son-in-law, Jose Rod, that stands out as her most unforgettable achievement. In the past, she had several major successful tiatrs such as Sounsar Sudhorlo, Adim Tem, Atam Hem, Mog Kazar Divorce (Love, Marriage, Divorce), Angvonn, Darunn Voddil, and Gharachem Sukh. Mendes's artistic endeavors extended beyond the realm of tiatr, leading her to make contributions to the Konkani film industry. Her talent and professionalism on stage earned her roles in three Konkani films. Pio Esteves of O Heraldo writes, in the film Amchem Noxib (1963), directed by A. Salaam, Mendes's chemistry and lively performance alongside the comedian Anthony Mendes remain etched in the memories of audiences. Notably, her spirited rendition of "Tum Nasloi Punn Tuka Sweater Kori" showcased her versatility and garnered widespread acclaim.

Another significant film in Mendes's filmography is Nirmon (1966), also directed by A. Salaam, where her melodious interpretation of "Claudia" resonated deeply with audiences. Interestingly, it was during the production of Nirmon that Mendes encountered her life-partner, Romeo Mendes, who portrayed her on-screen brother. This serendipitous meeting added a personal dimension to the film's significance in her life. In addition to her contributions to Konkani cinema, Mendes showcased her talent in Al Jerry Braganza's Sukhachem Sopon, a film that further exemplified her range as an actress. Her presence extended beyond the Konkani film industry, as she also appeared in Bonifacio Pereira's Zababdari and portrayed a comedic role in Jagdish Narulia's Hindi film Mohabbat Zindagi Hai (1966). Furthermore, Mendes displayed her artistic versatility by playing a significant role in Cyrus Mistry's English play titled The Legacy of Rage.

=== Introduction to Konkani music and audio albums (1980s–1990s) ===
Pio Esteves of O Heraldo writes, in the realm of Konkani music, Mendes made a significant impact and stands out as a pioneering female singer. Prior to the rise of Lorna, Mendes held the position of being the unrivalled "queen of the Konkani stage". Mendes's entry into the music world was facilitated by Alfred Rose, who provided her with opportunities to showcase her talent through LPs for His Master's Voice. Her popular solo performances include "Nursichem Fugasaum" and "Cheddum Xetcamteachem." Collaborating with Alfred Rose, Mendes delivered memorable duets such as "Kazari Bhoinnik Lagon," "Fottoilem Deva," and "Ago Mojea Sundorea." Her songs garnered popularity and were frequently requested on All India Radio.

In addition to her musical achievements, Mendes also ventured into writing and directing tiatrs, having created three productions as of 1995: Abghat, Tum Saiba Konn, and Khuimchem Mojem Ghor (Which one's my house?). One of her collaborations was with the Konkani musician Chris Perry, resulting in the creation of the masterpiece "Piti Piti Mog". Mendes boasts an extensive discography, with her vocals featured in over 500 audio cassettes, CDs, and LPs by various artists, including her son-in-law Jose Rod and Anil-Fatima. During the 1980s, Mendes and her husband Romeo created a collection of audio cassettes, starting with Jivit Ek Sopon, which was successful. The series was introduced by Bollywood actor Amitabh Bachchan, who gave an opening speech in Konkani. They went on to release albums like Rosacho Dis, Padr Agnel, and more, ultimately producing a total of 15 audio albums together. Mendes not only produced numerous audio cassettes featuring her own songs but also recorded for His Master's Voice. As a tiatrist, she travelled extensively to foreign countries, including Africa, England, and the Gulf countries. As of 1995, despite the passage of time, Mendes remained an active singer and actress, regularly appearing in tiatrs directed by popular directors.

== Personal life ==
=== Marriage and children ===
Mendes entered into matrimony with Romeo Mendes, a theatre contractor and producer, in the year 1966. The couple together had three daughters named Judy, June, and Lara. Notably, their eldest daughter, Judy, subsequently married Jose Rod, a Konkani singer. Prior to her marriage to Romeo, Mendes showcased her acting skills in one of his theatrical productions at Gowalia Tank, Bombay, specifically at Tejpal Hall. Romeo played a pivotal role in introducing Prince Jacob to the Mumbai theatre scene.

=== Residence and health ===
As of the year 1995, Mendes resided in Goa Velha, Goa, and shared her abode with her family in Bandra, Bombay. Her husband Romeo died on 10 September 1999, at the age of 59 in Mumbai. According to the 2012 Directory of Tiatr Artistes, Mendes resided near Ambedkar Road, Mumbai. During the COVID-19 pandemic, Mendes contracted COVID-19 but managed to recover, though she required supplemental oxygen support during her recuperation. She had a love for reading, and among all authors, Sidney Sheldon stood out as her favorite, with If Tomorrow Comes holding a special place as her top choice.

== Style and reception ==
In relation to her craft as an actress and singer, Mendes underscored the significance of effectively portraying characters through appropriate costuming and emotive performances, thereby garnering the appreciation of the audience. With respect to singing, she emphasized the creation of enduring songs that stand the test of time, as such compositions leave a lasting impact while critiques tend to diminish over time. Vocal modulation and suitable attire also played vital roles in her artistic presentations. Despite encountering various obstacles, Mendes considered herself fortunate to have achieved substantial success in her stage career. As of 2017, she remained resolute in her commitment to continue contributing to the Konkani stage until her last breath.

== Death ==
On 7 April 2024, Mendes died in Bandra, Mumbai at the age of 79 following an extended period of illness. The news of her demise was met with condolences from various tiatr personalities and enthusiasts, including her sister Fatima D'Souza, Alexin de Morjim, Peter D'Souza, Ophelia "Ophy" Fernandes, Tomazinho Cardozo, Cyriaco Dias, Kenny Zuzarte, and Caraciol D'Souza.

== Selected stage works ==
Year	Title	Role	Notes	Ref
1960	Hanv To Tarvotti		Professional debut	
1950s/1960s	Fuddar			
1950s/1960s	Bancruttam Bancrutt			
1950s/1960s	Dotor Advogad			
1950s/1960s	Dilolo Jurament	Director	Debut as director	
	Obgath	Writer/director		
	Tum Saiba Konn	Writer/director		
	Don Ghoram	Writer/director		
	Bailek Lagon			
	Besanv			
1990s	Mauli			
	Sounsar Sudhorlo			
1997	Adim Tem, Atam Hem			
1970s	Mog Kazar Divorce			
1961	Angvonn			
	Darunn Voddil			
2014	Gharachem Sukh			
	Khuimchem Mojem Ghor	Writer/director		
