= Young Chico =

Indian singer (1952–2019)

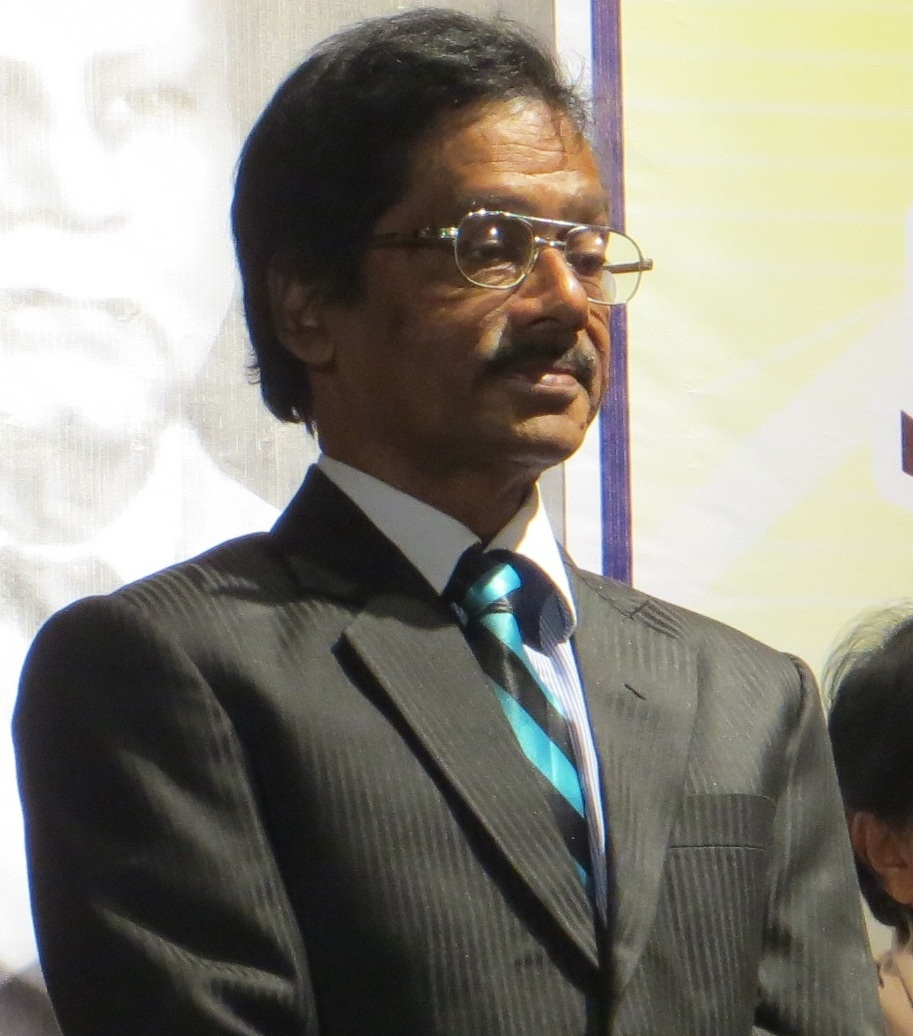
- Bringel at Ravindra Bhavan, Margao in 2013
- Born: Francisco Xavier Paulino Dias dos Milagres Bringel; 26 January 1952; Mapuçá, Goa, Portuguese India
- Died: 2 January 2019 (aged 66); Goa Medical College, Bambolim, Goa, India
- Burial place: St. Diogo Church cemetery, Guirim, Goa
- Occupation: Singer
- Years active: 1976–2010s
- Spouse: Connie Bringel
- Children: 2

Francisco Xavier Paulino Dias dos Milagres Bringel (Note: Bringel's birth certificate in Portuguese, when translated into English, states his name as Francisco Xavier Paulino Dios Dos Milagues Bringel, which appears to contain two typos.) (26 January 1952 – 2 January 2019), known professionally as Young Chico, was an Indian singer known for his work in Konkani films and tiatr productions.

Team Café of O Heraldo writes, Bringel, known as the "Man with Golden Voice," was a devoted admirer of tiatr from an early age. He gained fame for his singing talent and was particularly known for his melodious renditions of Konkani songs, notably his acclaimed piece titled "Nouro". Throughout his career, Bringel collaborated with esteemed figures in the tiatr industry, including directors C. Alvares, M. Boyer, Remmie Colaco, Prem Kumar, Alfred Rose, Bab Peter, Tony Martin, Chris Perry, and Kid Boxer, among others.

Besides his vocal contributions, Bringel also ventured into music production, releasing numerous audio cassettes. He showcased his own compositions as well. The Goan Everyday writes, with Bringel's distinctive bass voice and timeless tracks such as "Milenna", "Christalina", and "Nouro", his commitment to professionalism and selfless dedication elevated tiatr performances, making them both meaningful and brilliant.

== Early life ==
Francisco Xavier Paulino Dias dos Milagres Bringel was born on 26 January 1952, in Mapuça, Goa, which was then a part of Portuguese India during the era of the Portuguese Empire (now in India). He belonged to a Goan Catholic family and was the son of Emerico Luis Bringel (later known as Emerico Luis Carlos Sebastiao Bringel), a proprietor, and Ida Carolina Dias Bringel, a homemaker. His lineage included his poet grandfather, Paulino Dias.

From an early age, Bringel demonstrated musical talent. During his school years, he participated in concerts, attracting audiences with his singing. His performances were met with applause, as his voice captivated listeners until the final note. This foundation led to his early involvement in a band that performed at weddings and other celebratory occasions.

At the age of 13, he made his debut on the Konkani stage, participating in village tiatrs and delivering renditions primarily composed by Alfred Rose. Bringel admired Rose, who was recognized as the "Melody King of Goa" and had achieved success in the tiatr domain. Bringel's vocal tone was similar to that of his idol, Alfred Rose.

== Career ==
Bringel's journey in the world of music began when he joined the English beat group Imaginations hailing from his own village. After performing with the group for a number of years, Bringel made a significant decision to devote himself entirely to the tiatr stage. It was in 1976 that he made his professional tiatr debut with the play Seza Pai, written and directed by Vincent de Curtorim, widely recognized as Star of Curtorim. During this tiatr production, Bringel assumed the stage name "Young Chico" and showcased his vocal prowess through two solos. The play Seza Pai achieved great success, with Bringel's solos contributing significantly to its acclaim. The audience, astounded by Bringel's performance, warmly embraced him and bestowed upon him the endearing title of "Junior Alfred Rose".

Bringel's singing abilities soon caught the attention of tiatr writers and directors, who eagerly sought his contribution to their productions. He swiftly garnered a reputation as the most sought-after singer of his time. Initially relying on others to compose songs for him, Bringel eventually expanded his creative horizons. His collaborations with prominent directors such as Jacint Vaz, M. Boyer, Remmie Colaco, Fr Freddy J da Costa, Prem Kumar, C. Alvares, Patrick Dourado, Anil Pednekar, Anthony Sylvester, Alfred Rose, Inacio de Canacona, Anthony San, and others provided ample opportunities for him to showcase his singing skills and captivate the hearts of the audience. Furthermore, his collaborations with performers such as Shalini and Ophelia elevated the standards of the Konkani kantar genre, leaving a lasting impact on the musical landscape.

Bringel extended his musical prowess beyond live performances by lending his voice to numerous audio cassettes and CDs produced by various artists. Demonstrating his versatility, he garnered attention from multiple producers involved in the production of Konkani audio albums. His performances transcended geographical boundaries, as he graced musical shows not only in Goa but also in prominent cities such as Delhi, Pune, Kolkata, Mumbai, Kuwait, Dubai, Abu Dhabi, and Doha. During a performance in Dubai, Bringel's profound songs left a lasting impression on the audience, leading them to bestow upon him the honorary title of the "Man with a Golden Voice." His contributions to the theatrical realm were recognized by the esteemed Kala Academy, which honored him on Tiatr Day for his invaluable services to the tiatr stage. Furthermore, Bringel showcased his vocal talents in the Konkani film Adeus Moga, directed by his daughter Bushka, and lent his voice to the film Girestkai.

During a performance in the tiatr production titled Sounsar Sudhorlo by M. Boyer in Delhi, Bringel had an encounter with Connie, who would later become his spouse. Connie, known for her affiliation with renowned jazz singers Joe and Babush who had established themselves as figures in the national music scene. Bringel's compositions, such as "Milena" written by Tomazinho Cardozo and "Novro", have continued to captivate audiences through the airwaves of FM radio stations. In the 1980s, his creations received recognition on All India Radio's program 'Manajogtim Gitam, where his songs "Milena," "Hanv Poddiam Mogan," "Maim," and "Novro" garnered popularity. These tunes also garnered a listenership on the acclaimed Radio Ceylon.

== Personal life ==
Bringel encountered his future spouse, Connie, during a theatrical tour in Delhi. Connie is the sister of jazz singers Joe and Babush. The couple went on to have two children: a son named Anthony, professionally known as Junior Chico, who plays percussion for The Syndicates, and a daughter named Bushka, who has carved out her own successful career as a singer.

== Awards ==
Hailing from the census town of Guirim, Bringel has received numerous awards for his singing abilities. His achievements include the "Kala Gaurav Puraskar" from the Directorate of Art and Culture, bestowed upon him by the Government of Goa. The Tiatr Academy of Goa recognized his enduring contributions with the "TAG's Lifetime Contribution to Tiatr award". Additionally, Bringel was honored by the Kala Academy Goa and the 125th Anniversary of Tiatr Celebration Committee for his significant impact on Goan tiatr. He also received the esteemed "Golden Voice Award" from Abu Dhabi.

== Death ==
On 2 January 2019, Bringel died at the Goa Medical College while undergoing treatment for a hip replacement. The cause of death was reported as a cardiac arrest. (Note: According to reports from Team Café of O Heraldo, Bringel's death was attributed to a short-term illness.The Goan Everyday stated that, based on information from family sources, he had been homebound for the past few years.) Following his demise, a funeral service was held two days later at St. Diogo Church in Guirim.

=== Reactions ===
Anthony San, a fellow performer who frequently shared the tiatr stage with Bringel, recalled their professional collaboration dating back to 1975. In various productions, both artists would often commence the performances with an opening song. Notably, in the tiatr titled Ekuch Ghor (One House), the trio of Alfred Rose, Bringel, and Anthony San would take center stage.

Anthony San revealed the shared aspiration he and Bringel harbored for recording their voices together. This aspiration was ultimately realized in 1979, when they seized the opportunity to record for the Konkani film Girestkai (Weath), produced by Das. The recording session took place at Mumbai's renowned Navrang studio, featuring lyrics penned by Rosario Rodrigues and music composed by Emiliano D'Cruz. Despite Anthony San's own accolades in the realm of singing, he consistently held an appreciation for Bringel's melodious vocal abilities. Furthermore, Anthony San acknowledged Bringel's talent in singing across multiple languages, including English, Konkani, and Portuguese. He further added, while Bringel's absence on the tiatr stage will undoubtedly leave a void, his enduring legacy of musical contributions ensures his continued presence in our collective memory.

Joe Rose who was closely associated with the singer, acknowledged the significant impact of Bringel's performances on his first audio cassette, titled "Top Konkani Hits." In particular, Bringel's rendition of Joe Rose's compositions "Nouro" and "Maim" greatly contributed to the immense success of the album. Their professional collaboration extended beyond the recording studio, as they embarked on several tiatr tours across various cities including Goa, Mumbai, Delhi, Calcutta, and the Gulf countries. During these tours, they shared moments of light-hearted camaraderie with the rest of the troupe, engaging in jovial pranks that fostered a vibrant atmosphere.

Hortencio Pereira, another artist of the Konkani stage, expressed his profound shock upon learning of Bringel's passing. Notably, Pereira had the privilege of collaborating with Bringel on multiple occasions, where they performed duets together in various dramas. Bringel's vocal contributions played a pivotal role in four of Hortencio Pereira's cassettes and CDs, earning him great respect as a singer, akin to the renowned Alfred Rose. Pereira offered his prayers for Bringel's soul and extends his wishes for strength to the grieving family.

The passing of Bringel is a significant loss for the Konkani tiatr stage, as expressed by Wilson Mazarello, who described him as a highly talented tiatrist and an exceptional singer. Another tiatrist, Fatima D'Souza, shared her personal connection with Bringel and reminisced about the memorable experiences they had together, including their travels, shared jokes, and time spent on stage.

The Tiatr Academy of Goa (TAG), representing the tiatr community and enthusiasts, extended its sincere condolences to the grieving family of Bringel. They mourned his death and expressed their heartfelt sympathies on behalf of the entire tiatr fraternity.
