= Mike Mehta =

Indian criminal lawyer and actor (1947–2025)

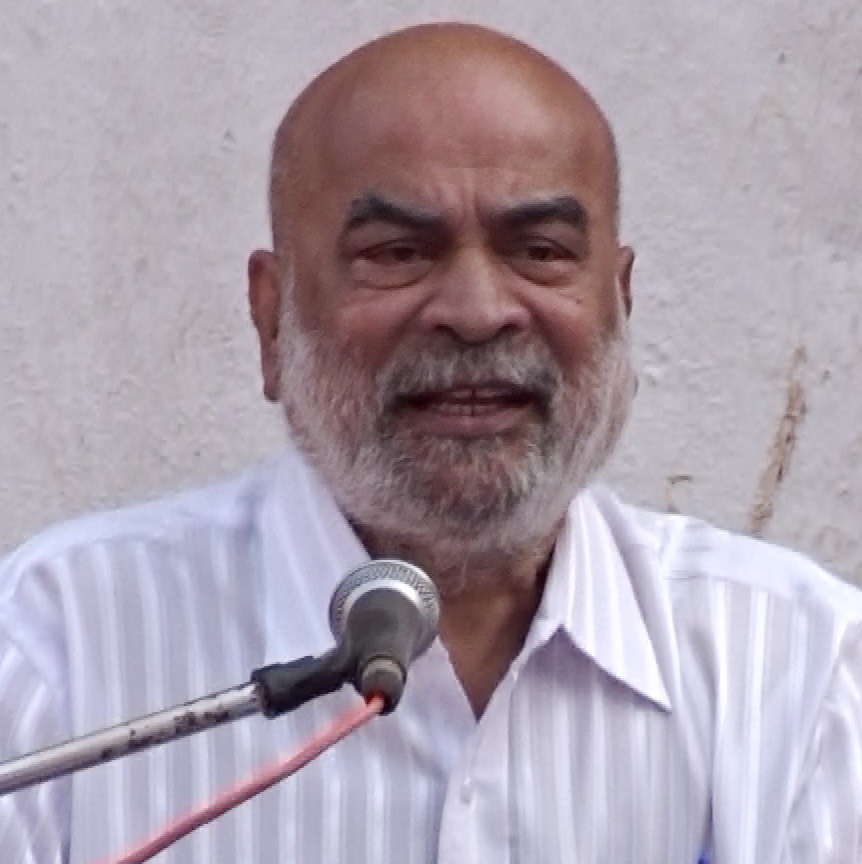
- Mehta in 2015
- Born: Miguel Transfiguraçaõ de Cristo Rodrigues; 6 August 1947; Borim, Goa, Portuguese India
- Died: 1 November 2025 (aged 78); Goa Medical College, Bambolim, Goa, India
- Other names: Michael Rodrigues; Transfiguração de Jesu Cristo Rodrigues
- Education: Parvatibai Chowgule College; Kirti M. Doongursee College; University of Bombay (B.A., LL.B)
- Occupations: Advocate; criminal lawyer; actor; playwright; director
- Years active: 1979–2014
- Notable work: Doli Saja Ke Rakhna
- Spouse: Elsie Rodrigues
- Children: 1
- Relatives: Jose Rod (first cousin once removed)

Miguel Transfiguraçaõ de Cristo "Michael" Rodrigues (6 August 1947 – 1 November 2025), known professionally as Mike Mehta, was an Indian senior advocate, criminal lawyer, actor, playwright and theatre director known for his work in Hindi, Konkani films, television, and tiatr productions. He provided legal counsel to two Goan politicians, Francisco Monte Cruz and Churchill Alemao, who served as ministers and represented the Benaulim Assembly constituency in the state of Goa.

== Early life ==
Miguel Transfiguraçaõ de Cristo Rodrigues was born on 6 August 1947, in Borim, Goa, which was a part of Portuguese India during the era of the Portuguese Empire. He was born into a Goan Catholic family, with his father being José Pascoal Rodrigues and his mother being Cristalina Dias, a homemaker, also known as Cristalina Luis.

Rodrigues showcased his talents during his school years by actively participating in English-language concerts and theatrical productions. His proficiency in English and his strong, powerful voice propelled him towards a career as a professional compere, showcasing his talents in hosting events and engaging audiences. Rodrigues gained recognition for his role as a host for various events including weddings, social gatherings, public assemblies, and musical performances. Despite his achievements in this field, Rodrigues experienced a sense of discontentment and yearned for greater fulfillment in his work. In his quest for artistic satisfaction, he immersed himself in the local tiatr scene, regularly attending performances and closely observing the skills and techniques employed by accomplished tiatrists.

Rodrigues achieved recognition performing under the pseudonym Mike Mehta during his participation in English concert showcases. He received his formal education at notable institutions, including St. Michael's High School in Mahim, Bombay, followed by St. Aloysius High School in Bandra and Guardian Angel High School in Sanvordem, Goa. Continuing his academic pursuits, Rodrigues pursued higher education at Parvatibai Chowgule College in Goa and Kirti M. Doongursee College in Dadar. His educational endeavors culminated in the attainment of a Bachelor of Arts degree in English Literature and a Bachelor of Laws from the University of Bombay. During his educational journey from school to college, Rodrigues actively engaged in a variety of English concerts, occasionally expanding his repertoire to include performances in Hindi as well. Despite his proficiency in the Konkani language, he did not have the opportunity to showcase his talents in Konkani concerts, even during his tenure at Guardian Angel High School and Chowgule College in Goa.

== Theatrical career ==
Rodrigues was a playwright and performer whose socio-political plays, such as Grant Road, Goenkaranchem Rogot (Goans' Blood), and Goem Viklem Ghanttar, hold a significant place in Konkani theatrical history. In his later years, Rodrigues's affection for the Konkani language inspired him to engage in the creation, direction, and acting in tiatrs, which are traditional Konkani musical dramas. Throughout his career, Rodrigues pondered the question of why Bengali literary figure Rabindranath Tagore was awarded the Nobel Prize in Literature for his Bengali work Gitanjali, while Konkani writers had not received similar recognition. This contemplation became a driving force behind Rodrigues's decision to explore complex and challenging subjects in his Konkani tiatrs, believing that dedication and sincerity could lead to comparable achievements. However, despite his commitment, Rodrigues has yet to receive any awards for his work, resulting in his relative anonymity as a tiatrist, as noted by writer Fausto V. Da Costa. Rodrigues has made a significant impact on the heritage of Konkani tiatr. Over a period of 35 years, he engaged in more than 550 theater performances, demonstrating his proficiency and experience. Furthermore, Rodrigues holds educational achievements in theater and screenplay composition, enhancing his standing in the field. It was Rosario Dias who first introduced Rodrigues to the tiatr stage, casting him in the production Vivasghat (Betrayal).

In 1980, Rodrigues gained acclaim for his role in the successful Konkani play titled Purtugez Kolvont (Portuguese Artist), written by Konkani playwright John Claro. This play achieved a significant milestone by staging over 200 performances in locations such as Goa, Bombay, and Poona. Subsequently, Rodrigues was cast in another play by Claro called Inglez Madam (English Madam). Throughout his career, Rodrigues collaborated with popular Konkani directors in the tiatr stage, including M. Boyer, C. Alvares, Jacinto Vaz, Remmie Colaço, Kamat de Assolna, Premanand Sangodkar, Anil Kumar, Fr. Planton Faria, and others. Rodrigues, known for his adherence to the acting principles of "Konstantin Stanislavski's" school of acting, showcased his versatility as a writer, director, and producer, contributing to the creation of eleven tiatrs. His significant contributions to Goan theatre primarily revolve around socio-political themes. Examples of his theatrical works include Politik (which delves into the depiction of the Indian Emergency), O Papagaiyo, Canta E Beira (exploring the concept of Goan identity), Goenkaranchem Rogot (advocating for the official recognition of the Konkani language and its placement within the Eighth Schedule to the Constitution of India.), Goem Viklem Ghanttar (highlighting the issue of political defections), and Goem Tum Roddo Naka (emphasizing the importance of preserving tenanted lands and discouraging their conversion for building constructions).

Rodrigues has created several successful tiatrs, including Grant Road, Pavl Mhojem Chuklem, Sunita, and Rostadak Ostad. An acclaimed piece of his repertoire is Pavl Mhojem Chuklem, crafted in 1980 and later transformed into a published work by Om Connie Publication in 2003. Grant Road, staged in 1982, was a production that tackled an unconventional topic within the tiatr sphere. The performance featured the musical abilities of a band led by Konkani musician Chris Perry and included standout performances by Anil Kumar, Betty Ferns, Fatima D'Souza, Kamat de Assolna, Rodrigues in a leading role, and Jacinto Vaz in a comedic character. In addition to his contributions to tiatr, Rodrigues has ventured into other creative endeavors. He has contributed to the production of two Konkani films, written four teleplays, and has showcased his acting talent in both Konkani and Hindi cinema. He played a crucial part in the Konkani movie Girestkai, directed by Konkani filmmaker M. S. Das. Rodrigues has also been featured in Bollywood, such as in the film Doli Saja Ke Rakhna, alongside Akshaye Khanna, under co-producer Rajkumar Santoshi. Rodrigues has consistently pushed the boundaries of the tiatr genre, always striving for innovation and progress. He firmly believed that a tiatr's popularity did not necessarily indicate its progressive nature, advocating for the pursuit of experimentation as the true path to advancement. In his role as a director, he undertook various innovative endeavors in script development, direction, and presentation within the realm of tiatr performances. His contributions to the evolution of tiatr have left a lasting impact, introducing new trends and shaping the future of this theatrical form.

Rodrigues held a strong affinity for the Konkani stage, although he often juxtaposed it with theatrical productions in other regional languages and English theater. In his discerning evaluation, he ascertained that the Konkani stage significantly trailed behind its counterparts in terms of artistic prowess and overall theatrical caliber. Prior to finding his breakthrough, Rodrigues nurtured a strong determination to effect positive change within the realm of Konkani theater. However, he was faced with the predicament of lacking personal acquaintance with any professional tiatrists, which posed a formidable challenge to the realization of his ambitions. During his formative years, a propitious opportunity presented itself when Rodrigues crossed paths with John Claro, a seasoned and educated playwright in the tiatr field. Claro, engrossed in the composition of his tiatr titled Purtugez Kolvont, proffered sagacious counsel to Rodrigues, guiding him to prioritize building a strong stage presence and creating a lasting impression before venturing into initiatives aimed at advancing the tiatr art form. Fortuitously, Claro extended an invitation to Rodrigues to assume a minor role in Purtugez Kolvont, a performance in which Rodrigues delivered a memorable portrayal, garnering acclaim from audiences who were captivated by his talent. To Rodrigues' good fortune, Purtugez Kolvont enjoyed success, amassing almost 200 sold-out performances across various venues. This unprecedented triumph not only amplified Rodrigues' visibility but also conferred upon him the stature of a rising star. Consequently, several directors sought Rodrigues' acting abilities, offering him enticing opportunities to collaborate. As Rodrigues' reputation burgeoned, he steadily ascended fame, carving a prominent niche for himself within the realm of Konkani theater.

Author Wilson Mazarello writes, "tiatr performances featuring Rodrigues showcased his meticulous approach, characterized by thorough role study and a commitment to delivering memorable portrayals. As his stage presence grew stronger, Rodrigues undertook the task of composing original tiatrs, each showcasing distinctive and inventive features. He employed stage settings and lighting arrangements to enhance his work. With comprehensive storytelling and engaging dialogue, combined with his adept direction, Rodrigues breathed new life into the Konkani stage", writes Mazarello. Popular among Rodrigues's repertoire were acclaimed tiatrs such as O Papagaiyo, Canta E Beira, Hello Daddy, Pavl Mhojem Chuklem, Grant Road, and Dolle Dampchea Adim (Before you close your eyes), all of which garnered audience appreciation. Grant Road enjoyed the distinction of playing to packed houses in Bombay and even attracted consideration for adaptation into a feature film during the mid-1990s. Rodrigues also explored the realm of video filmmaking, producing adaptations of some of his scripts. During the 1990s, he harbored aspirations for the progression of the Konkani stage. In addition to his accomplishments as an actor and playwright, Rodrigues took on character roles for Konkani directors such as M. Boyer, Remmie Colaço, Aristides Dias, and John Claro. His multifaceted contributions further enriched the theatrical landscape.

== Personal life ==
Rodrigues was a legal professional specializing in advocacy and criminal law, practicing in Margao, Goa. Despite his legal background, he actively embraced the title of "tiatrist" and took pride in his association with the Konkani language and the Konkani stage. In 1995, Rodrigues resided with his family in Maddel, Margao. Despite his significant contributions to the Konkani theatre scene, he did not receive any formal recognition or awards for his work, leading to speculation about his standing within the tiatr fraternity. This speculation was further explored in an article titled "Has the Tiatr Fraternity Disowned Mike Mehta?" written by fellow Goan writer Fausto V. Da Costa and published in The Goan Review in September 2023.

Rodrigues distinguished himself as the only legal practitioner hailing from the village of Borim, where he excelled in his senior role as a criminal lawyer. After suffering a minor heart attack in 2014, he made the decision to retire from both his legal profession and his engagement in tiatrs. As of 2023, he resided in Pedda, Margao. Rodrigues shared a familial connection with Jose Rod, a Konkani singer and actor, as they are first cousins once removed through Rodrigues' father's brother. Rodrigues was married to Elsie Rodrigues, and their only son, Stanley, has followed in his footsteps and currently practices law at the High Court of Bombay in Goa.

=== 2018 physical assault ===
In June 2018, Rodrigues and his wife, Elsie, were assaulted by a man who resided in the same housing complex in Margao. According to reports, Fernandes allegedly threatened Elsie and later entered the couple’s apartment without authorization. This led to the filing of a criminal case at the Fatorda Police Station.

== Death ==
Rodrigues died on 1 November 2025, at the age of 78 at Goa Medical College in Bambolim, Goa. Two days later, he was buried at the Holy Spirit Church cemetery in Margao after a funeral service.
