= Jose Rod =

Indian singer and composer (1963–2026)

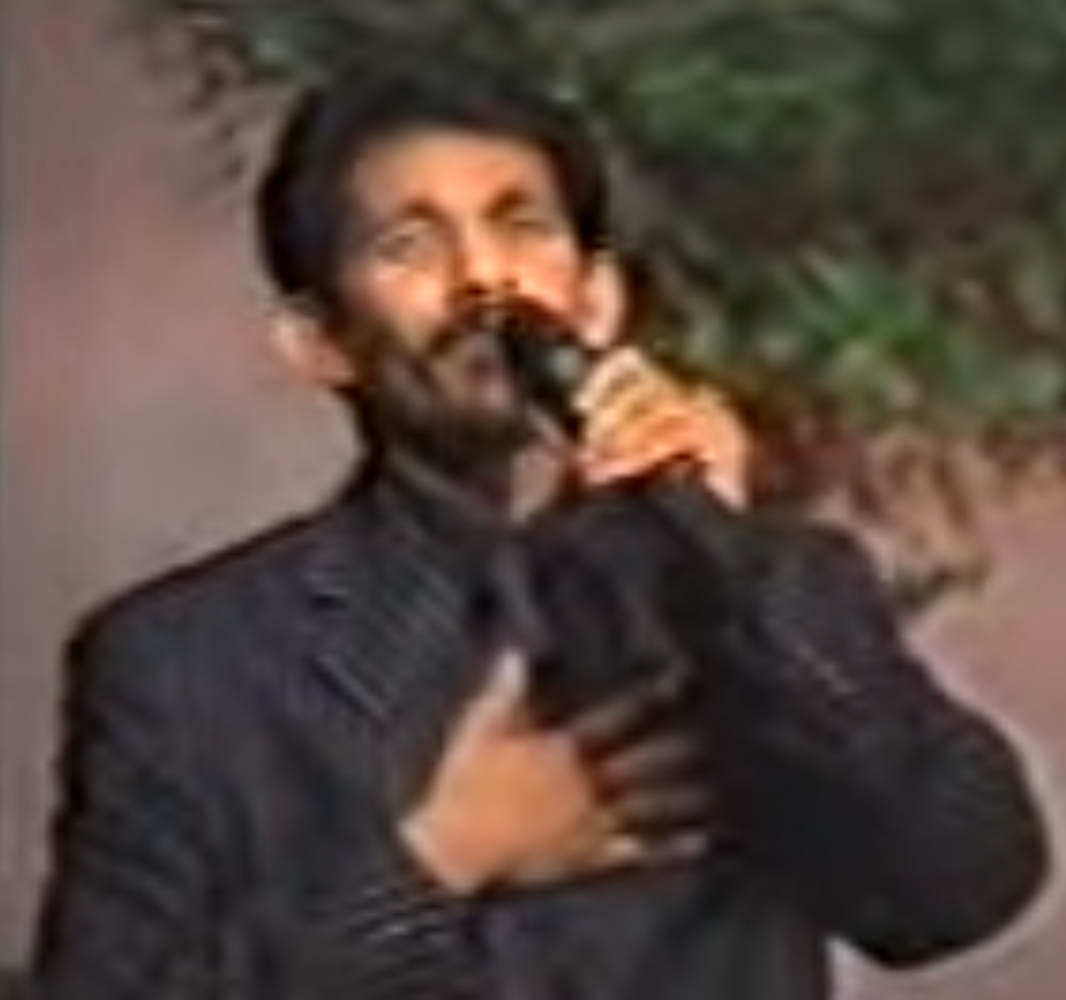
- Rodrigues in 2000
- Born: Joseph Constancio Rodrigues; 18 January 1963; Curchorem, Goa, India
- Died: 25 August 2026 (aged 63)
- Other name: José Remedios Rodrigues
- Education: Parvatibai Chowgule College; Bombay University
- Occupations: Singer; composer; theatre actor; theatre director; playwright
- Years active: c. 1968–2013
- Spouse: Judy Mendes (m. 1993)
- Children: 2
- Relatives: Antonette Mendes (mother-in-law); Romeo Mendes (father-in-law); Fatima D'Souza (aunt-in-law); Anil Kumar (uncle-in-law); Mike Mehta (first cousin once removed)

Joseph Constancio Rodrigues (18 January 1963 – 25 August 2026), known professionally as Jose Rod, was an Indian singer, composer, actor, director, playwright and footballer known for his work in tiatr productions.

== Early life ==
Joseph Constancio Rodrigues was born in Curchorem, Goa on 18 January 1963, to Constancio Anselmo Rodrigues, who was from Queula, and Maria Santana Rodrigues. He was the second child among four siblings, with an elder sister and two younger sisters. He grew up in the village of Sanvordem. Rodrigues completed his Secondary School Certificate (SSC) from Guardian Angel High School in Sanvordem. He pursued his undergraduate studies at Parvatibai Chowgule College in Gogol, Goa, and later obtained a postgraduate degree in Banking from Bombay University. After completing his higher education, he immigrated to Kuwait.

== Career ==
Rodrigues made his debut in tiatr productions at the age of 5, under the tutelage of his father's cousin Mike Mehta. His initial debut occurred in the theatrical production Nitik Sampoddlo, staged by Albert Carvalho from Sanvordem. This production featured professional cast, including performers M. Boyer, Remmie Colaço, and Jacinto Vaz. It was performed across various venues in Goa. In that period, non-stop shows were a popular entertainment format in Goa. These shows typically featured sets of 10-12 songs, each structured with a verse and chorus. The songs were woven into the narrative of the play. Besides acting, Rodrigues was also a singer in these shows. Mehta cast him in productions such as Papagai Canta e Bera (Parrot sings and bellows), Sunita, and Rogot Goykaranchem (Goan Blood). Rodrigues caught the attention of Anthony San, another figure in the tiatr industry. He was given the opportunity to participate in the show Darvontto, where he played as an actor and a singer. Rodrigues composed songs for this production.

Konkani director Prince Jacob, offered Rodrigues a role in his show Pinzrem (Cage). At the age of 20, he portrayed the character of a villainous 70-year-old man. He continued to play in villainous roles in subsequent non-stop shows directed by Jacob, including Kagot (Paper) and Painnem. Following his collaborations with Jacob, Rodrigues was approached by Roseferns to participate in three of his productions: Dovo Kavllo (White Crow), Girann, and Jem Tujem Tem Mhojem (What's yours, so is mine). Rodrigues then worked alongside Anthony San. Together, they co-wrote and produced two tiatrs; Bhiradd and Punn Kiteak? (But Why?).

Following his experience in tiatrs, Rodrigues embarked on a solo career as a writer and director. His theatrical production Mauli (Spider) concluded with 2,018 performances in Goa, establishing a new record for the fastest century of non-stop shows in history. Rodrigues later ventured into the music industry with the release of his debut album, Noman, in 2005. The album featured a collection of twelve solo songs, all performed by himself. Rodrigues then released additional audio cassettes and CDs. When writing his songs, Rodrigues would elements such as familial narratives and love songs. As a tiatrist, he encountered various challenges throughout his career. During a particular occasion, on his way to the first showing of his stage play Bhiradd in Panjim at 6:30 pm, Rodrigues was informed that his main actor, Mike Mehta, had been in an accident and was being treated in the intensive care unit. Mehta portrayed a wealthy character in Bhiradd, while Rodrigues himself was slated to depict a beggar. Within the same tiatr production, Rodrigues was tasked with delivering comedic performances, while the absence of Comedian Philip at the Mapusa show presented a challenge. Communication with fellow artists during that era, when mobile phones were not yet ubiquitous, proved to be a complex endeavor. Rodrigues then assumed the roles of comedian, villain, and hero, in the same production.

During his youth, Rodrigues represented Goa (U-19) in football and played for the senior division of the Goa football team. But he declined a job offer from a football club, opting to pursue his theatrical career instead. In 2020, Rodrigues recorded a new album, the details of which he preferred to keep under wraps.

When it comes to songwriting, Rodrigues moved towards themes connected to family, including heartfelt love songs. In 2020, he had planned on returning to the stage with a theatrical production. Rodrigues can be heard in several songs, and had released a total of nine Konkani audio albums. Among his works are Menin Jezu, Angounn, Tarvotti, Adeus, Suskar, Sopnam, Govai, Teag, and Noman. In Noman, the songs were composed and performed solely by him.

== Personal life and death ==
Rodrigues had a professional certification as a specialist in documentary credits. Rodrigues had established a production company named Reka Productions. On 5 May 1993, Rodrigues married Judy Philomena Mendes in Quepem, she came from Bombay and was the daughter of Konkani singers Antonette Mendes and Romeo Mendes. Their wedding ceremony took place on 6 June of the same year at Guardian Angel Church in Sanvordem. The couple has a son named Jrosky, who currently works as an investment banker in Kuwait, and a daughter named Juricle, who has obtained certification from the Association of Chartered Certified Accountants (ACCA) and is employed by Amazon, based in Bangalore.

In 1994, Rodrigues immigrated to Kuwait, where he embarked on a career in banking at Burgan Bank. On 12 March 2012, Rodrigues's father died at the age of 69 in his residence located in Curchorem, Goa. In 2009, Rodrigues underwent a surgical procedure to address a brain tumor that had been diagnosed. Rodrigues is known for his devout Catholic faith. From 2022, he resided in Goa,

On 25 August 2026, Rodrigues died at age of 63.
