= Anil Kumar (actor) =

Indian actor and producer (1951–2015)

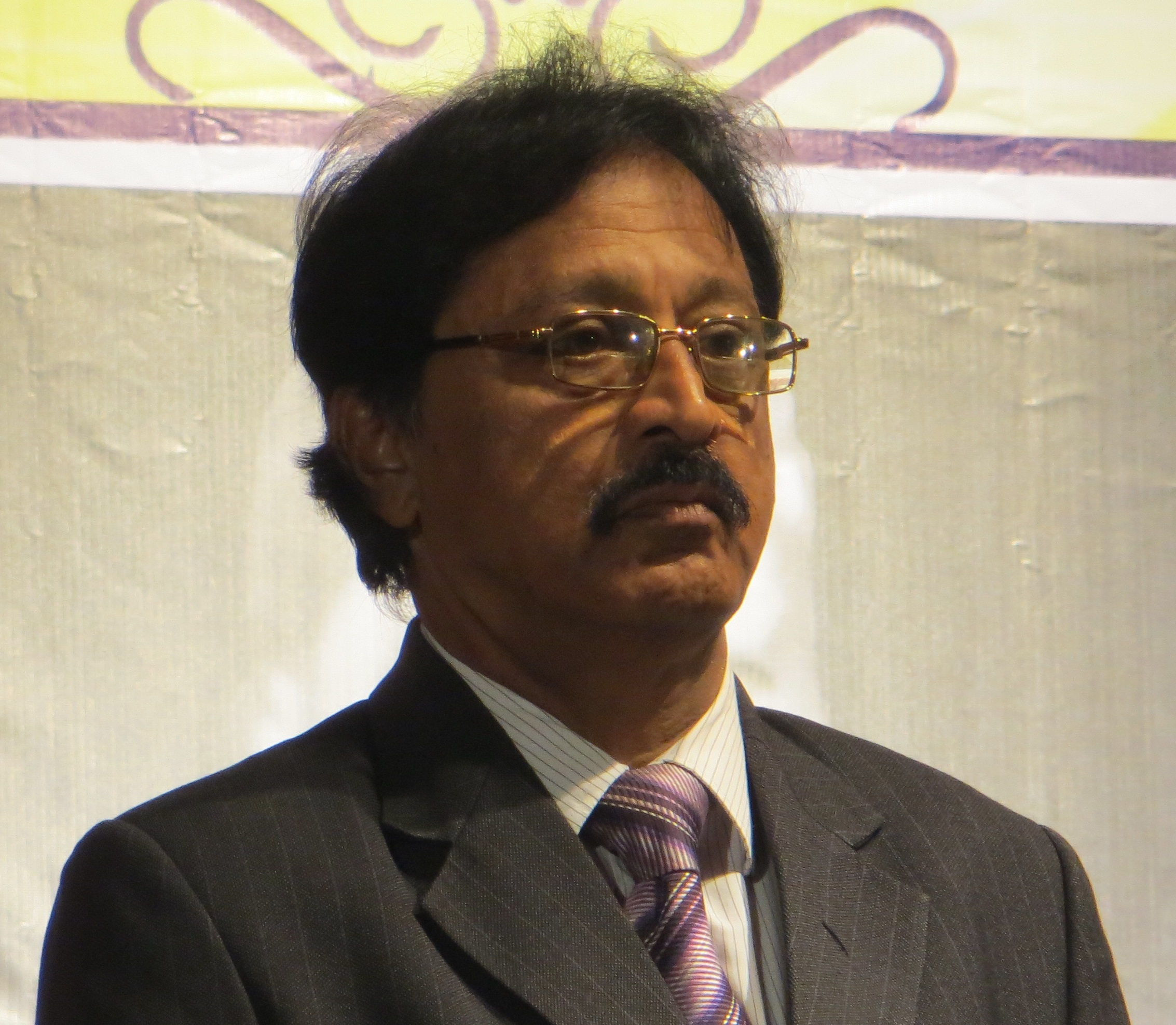
- Devulkar at Ravindra Bhavan, Margao in 2013
- Born: Anil Chandrakant Devulkar; 12 March 1951; Chandor, Goa, Portuguese India
- Died: 6 February 2015 (aged 63); Goa Medical College, Bambolim, Goa, India
- Resting place: Mathagramast Hindu Sabha Crematorium, Margao, Goa, India
- Education: Parle Tilak Vidyalaya Association
- Occupations: Actor; producer; director; playwright
- Years active: c. 1968–2014
- Notable work: Lakshmanrekha
- Television: Circus (1989)
- Spouse: Fatima D'Souza (m. 1982)
- Children: 1
- Relatives: A. K. D'Souza (father-in-law); Antonette Mendes (sister-in-law); Romeo Mendes (brother-in-law); Jose Rod (nephew-in-law)

Anil Chandrakant Devulkar (12 March 1951 – 6 February 2015), known professionally as Anil Kumar, was an Indian actor, producer, theatre director, and playwright known for his work in Hindi, Konkani films, television, khell tiatrs, and tiatr productions.

== Early life ==
Anil Chandrakant Devulkar was born on 12 March 1951 in Chandor, Goa, which was a part of Portuguese India under the Portuguese Empire and is now located in India to Chandrakant Devulkar and Hirabhai Devulkar. Devulkar's early exposure to theater occurred during his formative years as a child artist on the Marathi natak stage. He pursued his education at Lokmanya Tilak Vidyalaya in Vile Parle, Bombay, where he resided with his maternal uncle. Coming from a family with a lineage of writers and actors in Marathi theater, Devulkar developed a deep affection for Konkani drama. It was during his later adolescence, upon returning to Goa, that Devulkar embarked on his journey in the Konkani theater. He made his debut in the theatrical production Zolmachi Khomptti by Antonio Moraes, which featured a non-stop performance format.

== Career ==
Devulkar initially embarked on his acting career by participating in Marathi nataks (dramas) staged during local festivals. During his stay with his uncle in Bombay (now Mumbai), he also gained experience as a child artist in various Marathi nataks. At the age of 17, Devulkar transitioned to acting in Konkani tiatrs, where he had the opportunity to showcase his talent and develop his skills on the tiatr stage. He performed in khell tiatrs and tiatrs written by playwrights such as M. Boyer, C. Alvares, Jacinto Vaz, John Claro, Kamat de Assolna, and others.

Devulkar's contributions extended beyond acting, as he also ventured into directing tiatrs such as Bhirant (The Fear), Dev Podvekar (God, the Almighty), Saulli, Divea Pondak (Under the Lamp) and Mai, What is This? (Mother, What is This?). His portrayal of various character roles garnered appreciation from the tiatr audience. Additionally, Devulkar made appearances in Konkani feature films including Girestkai, To Dis Udelo, and Bhitorlea Monacho Monis. He even ventured into Hindi cinema with the film Lakshmanrekha (1991) and made an appearance in the Hindi TV serial Circus (1989).

Throughout his career, Devulkar demonstrated a deep passion for tiatr and the tiatr stage, which served as a driving force behind his achievements and recognition. His involvement in khell tiatrs provided him with the opportunity to collaborate and learn from producers, writers, and directors such as Patrick Dourado, Rosario Rodrigues, A. M. Pacheco, Menino De Bandar, Vitorino Pereira, Ligorio Fernandes, C. D'Silva, John D'Silva, Prince Jacob, Pascoal Rodrigues, and others. Devulkar's artistic contributions significantly contributed to the development and elevation of the standards and quality of khell tiatrs in Goa.

In 1980, Devulkar entered the professional tiatr stage for the first time, performing in the production Ordhi Bhakri, which was created by Prem Kumar, who also wrote, produced, and directed the theatrical production. Throughout his career, he collaborated with tiatr personalities such as M. Boyer, C. Alvares, Chris Perry, Remmie Colaço, Jacinto Vaz, Nelson Afonso, Kamat de Assolna, Shalini Mardolkar, John Claro, Alfred Rose, Mike Mehta, Joe Rose, Paul Romy, Rodhill, Seby D'Souza, Fr Freddy, and Fr Planton Faria.

The Navhind Times writes, Devulkar was an artist and writer known for his dedication and meticulous approach to his craft. With an ability to delve into the depths of his roles, he consistently delivered performances of depth and perfection. His talents extended beyond acting, as he was also known for his skill as a writer, particularly in the realm of tiatrs, which are theatrical productions in the Konkani language. Devulkar's tiatrs were characterized by their rich content, which effectively shed light on various social issues. His writing style demonstrated an understanding of the human condition, enabling him to effectively highlight and address these concerns.

Some of his tiatrs include Otmo (The Soul), Bhirant (The Fear), Saulli, Divea Pondak (Under the Lamp), Dev Podvedar (God, the Almighty), Dennem Devachem (Blessings of God), Noxib (Luck), Axechi Bhuk (Greedy Hunger)," Mai, What is This?, Raveena Hanga Nit Nam (Raveen, there's no justice here), and many others. These productions were not only acclaimed for their content but also for their direction, as Devulkar took on the role of director for all his tiatrs. His directorial contributions were applauded by audiences.

Devulkar's impact on the tiatr stage extended beyond his own works. He was entrusted with directing tiatrs written by playwrights such as M Boyer, including the popular productions Ekuch Rosto (The Only Way) and Soumsar Sudhorlo. Additionally, he directed the play Ordhi Bhakri, written by Prem Kumar. Devulkar's directorial skills were also showcased in revivals of classic tiatrs written by Souza Ferrao and Pai Tiatrist, two known figures in the history of tiatr. Notably, he directed productions of Souza Ferrao's Ghovyo Put and Pai Tiatrist's Tandilamchem Kestaum. Devulkar's artistic contributions were not limited to the tiatr genre alone. He made appearances in Konkani films, including M. Das's Girestkai and Pundalik Naik's Doulot (Wealth).

Furthermore, Devulkar ventured into the realm of video films, showcasing his acting prowess in productions such as Zababdari and Ordhem Cheador. Devulkar also took on the role of producer for video films like Moneak Zap Suttli and Bhavart Bhorvonso, which were well received by audiences. Devulkar's legacy includes his published works, such as the book of tiatrs titled Dev Podvedar (God, the Almighty) and Divea Pondak (Under the Lamp). He led theater training sessions for schools and colleges, covering acting, scriptwriting, and songwriting, at the request of the Tiatr Academy of Goa (TAG). Devulkar's final tiatr Atankvadi Goeant Naka (Goa doesn't need terrorists), was directed by Tousif de Navelim.

== Select filmography ==
=== Films ===
Year	Title	Role	Notes	Ref
1980	Girestkai			
1991	Lakshmanrekha	Police officer	Hindi film	
2004	Zababdari			
2005	Ordem Chador			
2006	Moneak Zap Suttli	Producer		
2006	Bhavart Bhorvonso	Producer		
2007	Bhitorlea Monacho Monis			
	To Dis Udelo	Manager	Also screenwriter	
	Doulot			

=== Television ===
Year	Title	Role	Notes	Ref
1989	Circus	Unnamed role	Hindi television series	
