= A. K. D'Souza =

Indian playwright and actor (1925–1978)

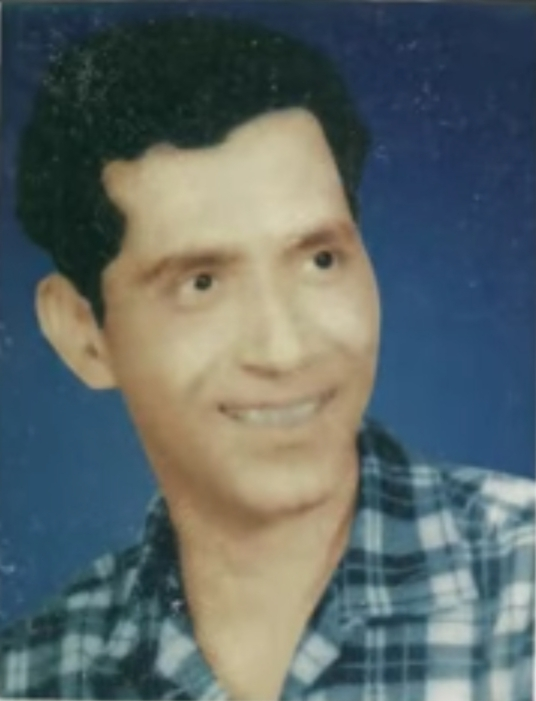
- D'Souza in an undated photo released by Tiatr Academy of Goa in 2012
- Born: Andre Antonio D'Souza; 13 June 1925; Goa Velha, Goa, Portuguese India
- Died: 25 May 1978 (aged 52); Bombay, Maharashtra (now Mumbai), India
- Other name: Anthony D'Souza
- Occupations: Playwright; director; actor; composer; singer; sailor
- Employer: P&O
- Spouse: Innocencia Alves D'Souza
- Children: Antonette; Fatima
- Relatives: Anil Kumar (son-in-law); Romeo Mendes (son-in-law)

Andre Antonio D'Souza (13 June 1925 – 25 May 1978), known professionally as A. K. D'Souza, was an Indian playwright, director, actor, composer, singer, and sailor known for his work in tiatr productions in the 1950s.

== Career ==
During the 1950s, D'Souza directed tiatrs, a form of Goan musical theater, and organized a series of performances in Bombay (now Mumbai) and London. Among his popular creations were Dilolo Jurament (The Given Promise) and Hanv To Tarvotti (It's me, the Seaman). His rehearsals for the tiatrs in Bombay were conducted at his residence. D'Souza shared a close affiliation with Minguel Rod, a Goan singer and composer, as well as the trio of tiatr performers called Kid Young Rod, which was formed in 1947 and consisted of Kid Boxer, Young Menezes, and Minguel Rod. Described by the Tiatr Academy of Goa as a distinguished individual with a fine personality, D'Souza was known as a gentleman who maintained a polished appearance. Wilson Mazarello, a Konkani singer and historian, describes him as a relatively modest writer and director of Konkani tiatrs during the early days, but who consistently produced tiatrs at regular intervals.

D'Souza played a pivotal role in shaping the career of his elder daughter, Antonette, on the Konkani stage. It was through one of his popular tiatrs, Hanv To Tarvotti, staged at the Princess Street Theatre in Bombay, that Antonette made her debut at the age of 15. D'Souza himself had a maritime background and, with the support of fellow seamen from the P&O Company, had the honor of presenting his tiatr Hanv to Tarvotti in 1957 at Southampton. The performance featured the Konkani tiatrist and Bollywood artist, Miss Mohana. It was during this production that Antonette made her directorial debut under the guidance of D'Souza, who served as the writer.

== Personal life ==
Information regarding the personal life of D'Souza remains limited, and few details are available. He was born on 13 June 1925 and hailed from the town of Goa Velha in Goa, which was a part of Portuguese India during the Portuguese Empire and is presently located in India. D'Souza entered into matrimony with Innocencia, a homemaker and singer. Eventually, he departed from Goa and settled in Bombay, where he and his wife established their residence. Both of their daughters, Fatima and Maria (later known as Antonette), were born in Bombay and subsequently gained recognition as singers and actresses in the Konkani theatrical domain. Antonette, in due course, married Romeo Mendes, a fellow Konkani actor and singer originally from Assonora but based in Bombay, and the couple had three children. Fatima, on the other hand, wedded Anil Kumar, a Konkani actor and producer hailing from Chandor, Goa, and they had one son together.

== Legacy ==
On multiple occasions, D'Souza has been commemorated as part of the "Somplolea Tiatristancho Ugddas" program organized by the Tiatr Academy of Goa (TAG). This initiative strives to pay tribute to the contributions and dedication of deceased tiatrists. These events took place in June of various years, including 2012, 2013, 2014, 2017, and 2019. The program featured other artists such as A. R. Souza Ferrão, Tony Fernandes, Jephsis Hitler, Reginald Fernandes, C. P. Dias, Ulhas Buyao, Romeo Mendes, Anthony Gonsalves, Chico D'Costa, C. A. Gomes, and Eddison Fernandes. The commemorative events were held at TAG's Conference Hall in Campal Trade Centre, Campal, Panjim, and were attended by D'Souza's daughter, Fatima, who delivered an address highlighting the lives and legacies of several late tiatr artistes.

== Selected stage works ==
Year	Title	Role	Notes	Ref
1957	Hanv to Tarvotti	Writer		
	Dilolo Jurament	Writer		
