= Pio Esteves =

Indian writer and journalist (born 1968)

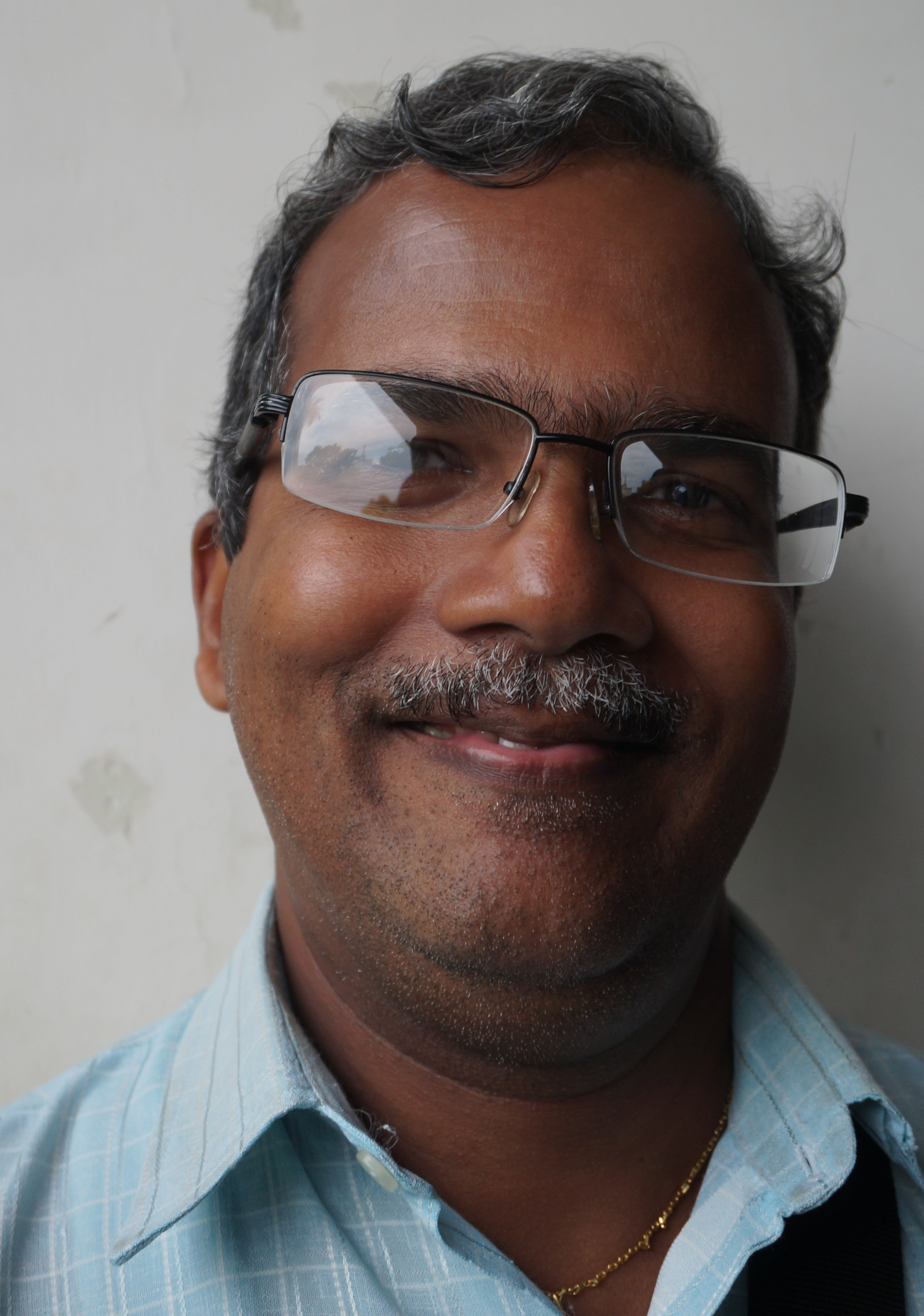
- Esteves in 2015
- Born: Pio Antonio Jose Caetano Judas Esteves; 16 May 1968 (age 58); Panjim, Goa, India
- Education: St. Xavier's College; MES College
- Occupations: Writer; journalist; cartoonist; poet; playwright; director
- Years active: 1990s–present
- Spouse: Cristina Estibeiro (m. 2002)
- Writing career
- Language: Romi Konkani
- Years active: 2005–2020; 2022
- Website: facebook.com/pio.esteves

Pio Antonio Jose Caetano Judas Esteves (born 16 May 1968) is an Indian writer, journalist, cartoonist, poet, playwright, and theatre director. As a journalist, he works for the local daily English newspaper O Heraldo. In the Konkani theatre scene, he is known for his work in children's tiatr productions.

== Early life ==
Pio Antonio Jose Caetano Judas Esteves was born on 16 May 1968, in Panaji, Goa. His parents are Agostinho do Rodrigo Esteves and Victoria C. Caldeira dos Milagres Martins do Rego. Esteves received the sacrament of baptism at the Se Cathedral in Old Goa. His educational journey involved attending Don Bosco High School in Panaji for his primary education, followed by earning a bachelor's degree from St. Xavier's College in Mapusa, Goa. He pursued further studies at MES College in Vasco da Gama, Goa where he completed his higher education. Esteves embarked on a career in education after obtaining his postgraduate degree. He dedicated five years to teaching at St. Xavier's High School in Bathinda, Punjab, and later served as a teacher at Christ School in Poonch, Jammu and Kashmir, for an additional two years. Esteves exhibited an affinity for the Konkani language from an early age, and his passion for it continued to grow as he matured.

== Career ==
On 24 April 2015, the Dalgado Konknni Akademi (DKA) marked Konkani Cinema Day by launching a new edition of their in-house magazine. The magazine, curated and edited by Vincy Quadros, the secretary of DKA, and a team of editors including Esteves, Menino Almeida, and Walter Menezes, was unveiled by Francis D'Souza, the then-Deputy Chief Minister of Goa. Esteves contributed a literary piece titled "How to Write Essays/Articles?" (Goan Konkani: Nibond/Lekh Koxe Borounche?) to this edition.

On 5 July 2015, the Dalgado Konknni Akademi (DKA) organized a "Poetry Presentation Workshop" at the Reginald Fernandes Conference Hall with the aim of providing guidance to poets writing Konkani in the Roman script and enhancing their presentation skills. Esteves was one of the poets who attended this workshop.

In April 2016, the Dalgado Konknni Akademi (DKA) hosted an award ceremony at the Reginald Fernandes Conference Hall. The event was graced by Brazinho Soares as the guest of honor, Natividade de Sa as a special invitee, and the presence of Premanand A. Lotlikar, the president of DKA, and Vincy Quadros, the secretary. Esteves was among the writers present at the function.

In May 2016, the Tiatr Academy of Goa (TAG), in partnership with St. Mary's School in Ponda, Goa, conducted a six-day acting workshop focused on tiatrs for students. Esteves, as the chief guest during the closing event, commended the fifteen participants and the school administration for their enthusiastic engagement with tiatr. He awarded certificates to the participants, along with Sr. Leena Cotta, in the presence of Jose Alexandre Rodrigues, the member secretary, and Jess Luz, a JCA of TAG.

In June 2016, the opening ceremony of the writers' conference was led by Fr. Simão Diniz, the principal of Rosary College of Commerce & Arts in Navelim. Hosted by the Dalgado Konkani Akademi (DKA), the conference aimed to encourage the development of Konkani literature in the Roman script. Willy Goes delivered a paper during the event, and the panel of speakers featured Alvaro Gomes, Brenda Menezes, and Esteves.

On 9 October 2016, Dalgado Konknni Akademi (DKA) hosted two competitions and awareness programs. An evening event, consisting of a competition and an awareness program, was conducted at the Colva venue. This event was hosted at the Lions Club of Colva Hall, in collaboration with the Lions Club and JCI, Colva. Esteves, alongside other individuals, was in attendance.

On 30 May 2017, DKA organized the Göy Mogacho Kovita Utsov (poetry convention) in Panaji to commemorate Goa Statehood Day. Esteves was among the featured poets who presented their poetic works. During discussions, the poets offered their insights on the advancements made by Goa in the 30 years since attaining statehood. Esteves engaged the audience through musical renditions, using a guitar and mouth organ for accompaniment.

On 22 October 2017, Dalgado Konknni Akademi arranged a "Workshop on Critical Evaluation" at the Reginald Fernandes Conference Hall. Esteves participated in the workshop, alongside writers Sonia Gomes, Anselm Femandes, JP Pereira, Irene Cardozo, Fausto V. Da Costa, Vassalo Carvalho, Alvaro Gomes, and Anthony Correia Pienkar.

In April 2019, DKA arranged a two-day workshop focused on the art of novel writing at the St Joseph Vaz Spiritual Renewal Centre in Old Goa. Esteves was among the attending writers who benefited from the workshop. During the event, the DKA secretary, Vincy Quadros, shared insights on novel writing based on the guidelines by American writer Jerry Jenkins.

In January 2020, Esteves showcased his talents at the 10th Children's Tiatr Competition, jointly organized by the Tiatr Academy of Goa and Ravindra Bhavan, Margao. He presented his self-written and directed tiatr, titled Opangull (Handicap). Esteves earned accolades for his lyrics, while his cast members also received recognition in various categories, including Best Comedian (Female), Best Background Music, merit prizes for Best Solo (Male), Best Solo (Female), The Best Duet award, and a merit prize for Best Duo in singing.

== Personal life ==
On 25 May 2002, he entered into matrimony with Cristina S. G. Estibeiro, a homemaker hailing from Macasana in Salcete, Goa. The nuptial ceremony was held at St. Lawrence Martyr Church in Agaçaim, where they exchanged their vows, following their civil marriage registration in Panaji two days prior. Currently, he resides in Agaçaim with his spouse and children. He is actively engaged in his local parish church, St. Lawrence Martyr Church, serving as a mistri, while also pursuing a career as a journalist. His professional endeavors as a journalist sparked his interest in photography, particularly capturing moments during cultural and religious events. He attributes his appreciation for the Konkani language to the influence and inspiration of Fr. Freddy J. da Costa, a Catholic priest and Konkani writer. Esteves is known for his strong devotion to the Catholic faith. On 12 May 2021, his mother Victoria died. In honor of her first death anniversary in 2022, Esteves published a biographical work entitled Niz Göykarn (transl. Native Goan) in the Konkani language. This publication marked Esteves's final literary contribution, as he subsequently decided to retire from writing books.

== Bibliography ==
- Esteves, Pio (2005). Kupam (in Konkani). Agaçaim, Goa: Esteves Prakaxon.
- Esteves, Pio (2006). Pakham (in Konkani). Agaçaim, Goa: Esteves Prakaxon.
- Esteves, Pio (2007). Ambot Tik (in Konkani). Agaçaim, Goa: Esteves Prakaxon.
- Esteves, Pio (2008). Sallkam (in Konkani). Agaçaim, Goa: Esteves Prakaxon.
- Esteves, Pio (11 November 2009). Kaddyo Boddyo (in Konkani). Agaçaim, Goa: Esteves Prakaxon.
- Esteves, Pio (2010). Lharam (in Konkani). Agaçaim, Goa: Esteves Prakaxon.
- Esteves, Pio (13 October 2011). Jinneche Panvdde (in Konkani). Pilar, Goa: Pilar Industrial Institute.
- Esteves, Pio (31 October 2012). Jinnechim Panvlam (in Konkani). Pilar, Goa: Pilar Industrial Institute.
- Esteves, Pio (October 2013). Ale Bele (in Konkani). Pilar, Goa: Pilar Industrial Training Institute.
- Esteves, Pio (18 November 2014). Jinnecheo Paklleo (in Konkani). Pilar, Goa: Pilar Industrial Institute.
- Esteves, Pio (2015). San'nam Vodde (in Konkani). Agaçaim, Goa: Esteves Prakaxon.
- Esteves, Pio (2016). Sorpotel (in Konkani). Agaçaim, Goa: Esteves Prakaxon.
- Esteves, Pio (2017). Katkutleo (in Konkani). Agaçaim, Goa: Esteves Prakaxon.
- Esteves, Pio (2018). Paim Vatt (in Konkani). Agaçaim, Goa: Esteves Prakaxon.
- Esteves, Pio (2018). Off the Mark. Agaçaim, Goa: Esteves Publications.
- Esteves, Pio (2 January 2019). Kanknnam (in Konkani). Goa, India: Generic. ASIN B084ZYP3YZ.
- Esteves, Pio (2020). Patram (in Konkani). Agaçaim, Goa: Esteves Prakaxon.
- Esteves, Pio (12 May 2022). Niz Gõykarn (in Konkani). Agaçaim, Goa: Esteves Publications.
