= Romeo Mendes =

Indian actor and singer (1940–1999)

- Mendes in the late-1980s
- Born: Remet Piedade Mendes; 4 June 1940; Bombay, British India
- Died: 10 September 1999 (aged 59); Mumbai, Maharashtra, India
- Other name: Star of Assnora
- Occupations: Actor; singer; composer
- Years active: 1960s–1980s
- Notable work: Nirmon (1966)
- Spouse: Antonette Mendes (m. 1966)
- Children: 3
- Relatives: A. K. D'Souza (father-in-law); Anil Kumar (brother-in-law); Fatima D'Souza (sister-in-law); Jose Rod (son-in-law)

Remet Piedade "Romeo" Mendes (Note: In the beginning of his career, Mendes was professionally known as Star of Assnora. However, he abandoned this moniker when he reemerged in the industry in the Konkani film Nirmon (1966), opting to be credited by his legal name instead.) (4 June 1940 – 10 September 1999) was an Indian actor, singer, and composer known for his work in Konkani films, television, and tiatr productions. He initially debuted on the Konkani stage as a singer with the stage name Star of Assnora. Following a period of success, he temporarily quit the industry due to professional commitments. He made a comeback in the Konkani film Nirmon (1966).

== Career ==
Wilson Mazarello, a Konkani singer and historian, documented the career of Mendes who made his initial foray into the entertainment industry at a young age as "Star of Assnora", where he showcased his vocal abilities. Following years of success as a singer, Mendes temporarily stepped away from the stage due to professional commitments. However, he made a comeback with a prominent role in the Konkani film Nirmon, where he not only acted but also composed the popular song "Claudia." This performance catapulted him to fame and attracted the attention of several tiatr directors, who eagerly sought his participation in their productions.

During the filming of Nirmon, Mendes had the opportunity to meet Antonette Mendes, a Konkani actress who portrayed his sister in the movie. Instantly captivated by her, Mendes soon proposed to Antonette after seeking her father's approval. Despite his passion for the stage, Mendes found it challenging to pursue a full-fledged professional career due to extensive business commitments. Nonetheless, he remained connected to his audience through the release of audio cassettes featuring his performances. Before their marriage in 1966, Mendes cast Antonette in one of his tiatrs at Gowalia Tank in Bombay's Tejpal Hall, showcasing her talent as an actress. Mendes also made contributions to the industry as a theater contractor and producer, notably introducing Konkani actor Prince Jacob to the Bombay (now Mumbai) scene.

Mendes left a mark on the Konkani music landscape by producing numerous successful audio cassettes featuring his songs. Notably, he was a pioneer in bringing Hindi film actors and actresses, including Amitabh Bachchan, Hema Malini, Anil Kapoor, and Vijayta Pandit, to lend their voices to Konkani audio recordings. Mendes also ventured into television production, creating his own TV serials for Doordarshan, featuring Konkani comedian Paul Romy. Furthermore, he showcased his vocal prowess through over 30 performances on Doordarshan, Bombay. In the 1980s, Mendes and his wife Antonette collaborated on a series of audio cassettes, with their debut album, Jivit Ek Sopon, garnering popularity. The launch of this album was graced by a special introductory speech in Konkani by Bollywood actor Amitabh Bachchan. This was followed by other releases such as Rosacho Dis and Padr Agnel. As a couple, they released a total of 15–17 audio albums and collaborated on numerous duets.

== Personal life ==
Remet Piedade Mendes was born on 4 June 1940 in Bombay, which was part of Bombay Presidency during British India. His family originally hailed from Assonora, Goa, which was then part of Portuguese India during the Portuguese Empire. Mendes must have spend some time in his parents' hometown before finally moving back to Bombay (now Mumbai) and making it his permanent residence. In 1966, Mendes married Antonette Mendes, a Konkani singer and actress, when he was around 26 and she was 22. Together, they had three daughters named Judy, June, and Lara. Judy, the eldest daughter, later married Jose Rod, a Konkani singer residing in Kuwait. According to the book titled 100 Years of Konkani Tiatro, Mendes and his family resided in Bandra, Bombay.

On 10 September 1999, Mendes died at the age of 59 in Mumbai, Maharashtra, India.

== Filmography ==
Year	Title	Role	Notes	Ref
1966	Nirmon	Ricard	Also singer & composer	

== Selected stage works ==
Year	Title	Role	Notes	Ref
Prior 1966	Untitled tiatr	Possibly contractor/producer		

== Select discography ==
- Claudia (1966)

=== Audio cassettes ===
- Jivit Ek Sopon (1980s)
- Rosacho Dis
- Padr Agnel
