= Mohabbat Zindagi Hai (1966 film) =

1966 film directed by Jagdish Nirula

- Poster
- Directed by: Jagdish Nirula
- Produced by: K C Gulati
- Starring: Dharmendra; Rajshree; Mehmood
- Cinematography: V. Ratra
- Edited by: V. K. Singh
- Music by: O. P. Nayyar
- Release date: 1966
- Country: India
- Language: Hindi

Mohabbat Zindagi Hai (transl. Love is life) is a 1966 Hindi film produced by K. C Gulati for Roop Chaya, and directed by Jagdish Nirula. The film stars Dharmendra, Rajshree, Mehmood and Deven Verma. The music was composed by O. P. Nayyar with lyrics by S. H. Bihari.

== Cast ==
- Dharmendra as Amar
- Rajshree as Neeta (Amar’s wife)
- Mehmood as Manglu
- Mehmood Junior as child artist
- Chand Usmani as Laajo
- Deven Verma as Advocate Vikram Sinha "Vicky"
- Nazir Hussain as Mr. Sinha
- Badri Prasad as Mr. Mehta
- Antonette Mendes as comedian

== Music ==
Song	Singer
"Yeh Purnoor Chehra"	Mohammed Rafi
"Tumhari Mulaqat Se"	Mohammed Rafi
"Na Jane Kyun Hamare Dil"	Mohammed Rafi
"Nazar Nazar Se Milao"	Asha Bhosle
"Raaton Ko Chori Chori"	Asha Bhosle
"Mehfil Mein Dilwalon Ki Aata Hai Jo Aane Do"	Asha Bhosle, Mahendra Kapoor
"Tum Sabse Haseen Ho Aur Sabse Jawan Ho"	Asha Bhosle, Mahendra Kapoor
"Bijli Ho Ya Ghata Ho"	Mahendra Kapoor
