= Premanand Sangodkar =

Indian theatre actor (born 1941)

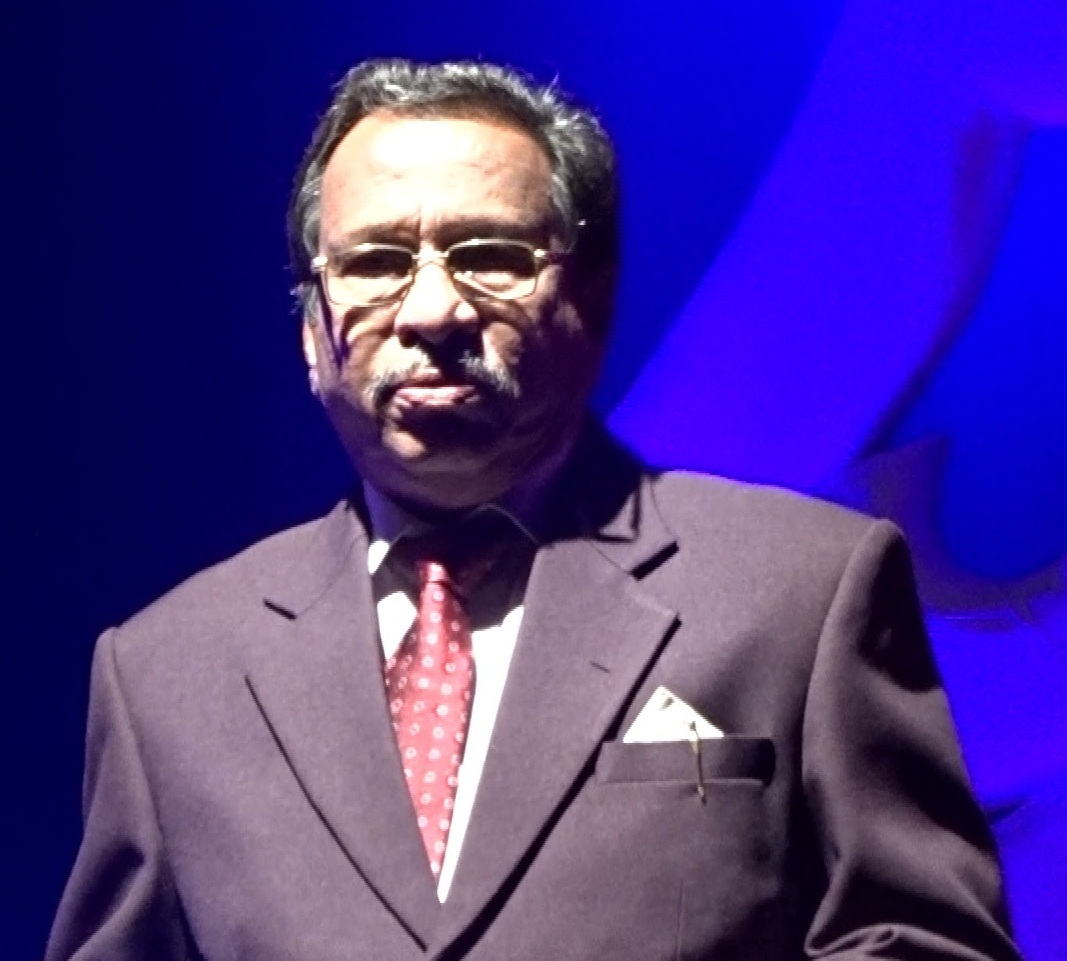
- Sangodkar at Ravindra Bhavan, Margao in 2014
- Born: Premananda Madco Sangoldacar; 16 April 1941 (age 84); Sangolda, Goa, Portuguese India, Portuguese Empire (now in India)
- Occupations: Theatre actor; director; playwright; AIR artiste
- Years active: 1980–2015
- Employer: All India Radio
- Organisation: Tiatr Academy of Goa
- Website: facebook.com/premanand.sangodkar.9

Premanand M. Sangodkar (born Premananda Madco Sangoldacar; 16 April 1941) is an Indian former actor, director, playwright, and All India Radio artiste known for his work on the Konkani stage. He started his career by acting in Marathi nataks and later made his debut in the tiatr production Ekuch Rosto (Only One Way) by M. Boyer in 1980, as a tiatrist.

== Early life ==
He originally came from the village of Sangolda in Bardez, and has resided in the city of Margao since 1947.

== Career ==
Sangodkar's artistic career took shape through his active involvement in numerous Marathi nattaks, theatrical performances organized by Natekar in the village of Marcel. These nattaks served as a platform for emerging talents, with the most talented groups earning the opportunity to compete in nattak competitions held at the nearby Kala Academy, situated in close proximity to the EDC building.

In 1980, M. Boyer undertook the staging of a tiatr titled Ekuch Rosto (Only One Way), which showcased the dynamics between two households-one Catholic and one Hindu. While Boyer was confident in finding suitable performers for the Catholic household, he faced challenges in sourcing artists who could effectively portray characters from the Hindu household. Ultimately, Boyer enlisted Tatoba and Alka Velingkar, a couple, for the lead roles, alongside Uday Bhembre and Ulhas Buyao, who were also cast members representing the Hindu family.

However, a mere three days prior to the final performance, the couple withdrew from their roles due to prior commitments, leaving Boyer in a state of apprehension. The situation was further compounded by the fact that the first show was scheduled to take place in Bombay (now Mumbai), where all available tickets had already been sold. Seeking a solution, Boyer turned to Buyao and Bhembre for assistance, who suggested Sangodkar as a potential replacement for the vacant roles.

Boyer, a discerning director, made a deliberate choice to observe the rehearsals of a Konkani play presented by the Konknni Bhasha Mandal at Damodar Vidya Bhavan in Margao. Following his assessment of the rehearsals, Boyer approached Sangodkar and provided him with a comprehensive briefing on the assigned role. Shalini Mardolkar was selected to portray the counterpart to Sangodkar, and after a three-day preparation period, the inaugural performance was scheduled to be held at St. Mary's Hall in Mazgaon.

Initially, Sangodkar, who was unfamiliar with his fellow tiatr artists, expressed hesitancy due to his lack of mental readiness. However, the encouragement and support from Buyao and Bhembre boosted his confidence. Owing to pre-existing business obligations, Sangodkar was unable to travel alongside the Goan artists, prompting Boyer to make special arrangements for a private cab. As some of the artists hailed from Goa while others resided in Bombay, rehearsals took place at Dhobitalao. Sangodkar was entrusted with the lead role of a bhatkar (landlord), but the coordination among the Hindu artists, who were all newcomers, displayed noticeable deficiencies. There were discussions among the other artists regarding the potential replacement of the lead actor, yet Boyer remained resolute in his decision and unwavering in his belief in Sangodkar's capability. In the meantime, Mardolkar, possessing confidence in both nattak and tiatr, provided Sangodkar with the necessary encouragement and support.

In order to confront stage fright and overcome various challenges, Sangodkar devised a strategy based on Mardolkar's suggestion. According to this approach, when one artist posed a question, they should respond with four queries. However, despite implementing this technique, Sangodkar encountered a negative reception from the audience during his performance, leaving the director and fellow artists disheartened. Subsequently, Mardolkar's spouse, A. Salam, a member of the film industry, extended an invitation to Sangodkar to visit his residence in Bandra. During their meeting, Salam offered Sangodkar the opportunity to observe a film shoot taking place in Juhu. It was during this visit that Sangodkar had the privilege of being introduced to the Bollywood actor Amjad Khan, known for his transition from stage to screen. Khan emphasized the challenges of live theatrical presentations compared to the advantages of multiple takes in film. This conversation served as a source of inspiration for Sangodkar, and they bid farewell.

During Boyer's subsequent performance at Dhobitalao, Sangodkar began receiving applause from the audience after delivering each dialogue. At this juncture, he realized that adhering strictly to the tiatr script was not obligatory. Instead, an artist's personal contributions played a vital role in elevating the quality of the tiatr. As Sangodkar initiated the practice of incorporating his own input into the tiatr, Boyer instructed his prompter to take note of the additional material integrated into the original dialogues. With Sangodkar's performances, the tiatr production swiftly gained popularity. Sangodkar made his debut on the tiatr stage in 1980, featuring in M. Boyer's production titled Ekuch Rosto. He continued to grace the same stage until 2015, when his final appearance was in Mario Menezes's tiatr, He Kaide Kosle?.

Sangodkar has had the privilege of working alongside notable figures in the field of tiatr, such as Jacinto Vaz, Prem Kumar, Remmie Colaco, John Claro, Mike Mehta, Wilmix-Sharon, Anthony Sylvester, Patrick Dourado, C. D'Silva, as well as emerging directors like Michael Gracias, Lawry Travasso, Bonaventure D'Pietro, and Anil Kumar. He has demonstrated his acting prowess by portraying commanding characters including landlords, judges, advocates, doctors, and priests. Noteworthy performances include his roles in Boyer's tiatrs Ekuch Rosto and Ghor Dukhi Ganv Sukhi (House Sad, Village Happy), Prem Kumar's tiatr Vauraddi (Worker), and Mike Mehta's tiatrs Papagay Canta E Bera and Grant Road.

== Personal life ==
Reflecting on the evolution of tiatrs, Sangodkar points out that the older productions had a more natural quality, characterized by memorable cantos written by C. Alvares and M. Boyer. However, he observes that modern tiatrs often prioritize disconnected jokes over cohesive storytelling, and lack the same attention to authentic character portrayal in terms of dress code. Despite this, Sangodkar acknowledges the progress made in contemporary tiatrs (1961–present), particularly in areas such as stage design, background music, lighting effects, and dialogue memorization. He highlights the dedication and education of today's tiatrists, who prioritize time management and punctuality.

== Selected stage works ==
Year	Title	Role	Notes	Ref
1980	Ekuch Rosto	Hindu landlord	Debut tiatr	
2000	Ghor Dukhi, Ganv Sukhi			
	Vauraddi			
	Papagay Canta E Bera			
1980s–2000s	Grant Road			
2015	He Kaide Kosle?		Last production	
