= Reginald Fernandes =

Indian writer and musician (1914–1994)

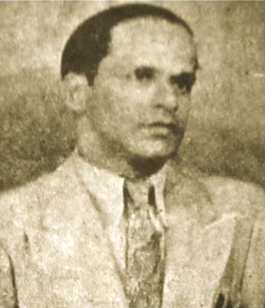
- Fernandes during his youth
- Born: Reginaldo Fernandes; 14 June 1914; Siolim, Goa, Portuguese India
- Died: 13 November 1994 (aged 80)
- Occupations: Writer; musician
- Years active: 1930s–1994

Reginaldo "Reginald" Fernandes (14 June 1914 – 13 November 1994) was an Indian writer, musician and cultural figure active in Goan Konkani music. He was known for having written a vast number of Konkani romans novels, over a hundred in number. He has been called the "King of Konkani Fiction".

== Career ==
Fernandes was active for many decades in the world of the Konkani romans, his career spanning over six decades. His first novel was published in 1932, and the last one, called Perdida, made it to the stands in 1994. His first novel was Lindorf.

He sold up to 5000 copies of his books, according to news reports, and some were reprinted; yet "the pundits of the Konkani language did not find any merit in his literature, probably because it was written in the Roman script."

Fernandes wrote fiction and romance, with an "imaginative approach" toe "effective descriptions of the situation". "Many readers would anxiously wait until his next book would be out in the market. There were many instances where he books became the best-sellers," says an article in The Navhind Times.

He was a writer, and a versatile musician trained in the trumpet and violin. Reginald led his own bad, and would perform at weddings, parties, hotels, feasts and tiatr (Konkani theatre performances). He has also performed out of India, and was an artiste at the All India Radio.

His band was called Reggie and his Melodians.Before that, he also was a key performer in bands such as Nellie's Dance Band, Vincente Carmine and his Orchestra, Mikey and Johnie's Orchestra, and Alfred Rose's Rose Buds, besides others. Fernandes is also known to have contributed to the music of the Bollywood film industry.

== Personal life ==
Fernandes was born on 14 June 1914, in the village of Siolim, and studied at the parochial school at Siolim village. He later moved to Bombay. He began writing in 1932, while he was employed at the band of a Maharaja's palace in what today is Gujarat. He also played at the palace of the palace of the Maharaja of Mysore.

His full name was Reginaldo Basil Fernandes, and his parents were the clarinet player Antonio Caridade Fernandes and Carmelina. He lived at Siolim's Aframento Vaddi, a local believed to have been immortalised in the Goa traditional mando song-form as Siole dongra sokolu... (Beneath the hills of Siolim), according to the writer Domnic Fernandes, writing in 2009.

Fernandes had to become the breadwinner of the family at an early age, after his father died of a paralytic stroke. He left for Bombay by the coastal steam-ship, and began writing in 1932, to overcome homesickness, according to Domnic Fernandes.

Fernandes died in 1994.

== Claim on large body of work ==
There is some disagreement on how many novels and novellas Fernandes actually wrote, the number ranging from more than a hundred to 190. During his 101st birth centenary celebrations in June 2015, it was noted that he had written some 190 Konkani novels, besides being an accomplished musician, lyricist and playwright.

== Impact and response ==
According to The Times of India though he "wrote extensively in Romi Konkani [but]...is virtually unknown to the younger generation as little effort was made to recognise him and his works". The Kuwait Goan Association honoured him for his contribution to the Konkani language, while shortly before his death he was bestowed with the Goa State Cultural Award for 1992–93.

Dale Luis Menezes has argued:

Reginald Fernandes’ writing career spans almost 40 years. This period that stretched around 1955-1992, Fernandes wrote more than 120 novels or what in Concanim came to be known as romans or romaxeo (pl.). The Concanim ‘romans’ is not adequately studied, neither in the history of Konknni literature nor in the history of Goan literature. Fernandes’ writings give the impression of pulp on first glance: they were printed on cheap paper, the books were pocket-sized, the plots were formulaic and revolved around love stories, crimes, and magic realism, and the language used had a touch of the dramatic in it. Perhaps this is the reason why dominant canons of Konkani and Goan literature never seriously considered the writings of Fernandes – or indeed other writers in the genre of ‘romans’ – as legitimately constituting literature.

== Tributes ==
Venita Gomes, writing in The Navhind Times Buzz has stated:

One of Goa’s finest and prolific Roman Konkani writers, popularly known as Romanxincho Patxai (King of Fiction), Reginald Fernandes, has written over 200 novels creating a lasting impression on the minds of innumerable readers.

== Related trivia ==
- Reginald Fernandes hailed from the village of Siolim in Goa, where his work and life is often remembered in recent times, especially during his anniversaries.
- He is known for his violin, and owned a trumpet autographed by the noted Jazz musician Louis Armstrong.
- During recent commemorative events of his life, a little table where he wrote most of his many romanses was also sometimes displayed.
- Reginald is credited with playing his "golden trumpet" for the band Rose Buds run by the noted Konkani singer and composer Alfred Rose.
- Siolim and its environs has a group called The Friends of Reginald.
- Many books authored by Goans are lost to time and poor protection. But Brazinho Soares, a collector of Konkani books published from many of the past decades, has at least 96 out-of-print potboilers and other memorabilia connected with Reginald, as of June 2015.
- Reginald would write novels with their titles named in subsequent alphabetical order, from A-to-Z, according to former president of the Dalgado Konknni Akademi, Tomazinho Cardozo.
- As a lyricist, Fernandes contributed to some memorable Konkani songs, both aired on the Emissora de Goa Portuguese-run radio station, as well as the All India Radio, which has operated in Goa after 1961. His songs were sung by Allen Costa, Ansu Rodrigues, Georgina Jacques and Johny Sylvester, who were permanent artistes of the Emissora de Goa radio station.
- He is known to have composed solos, duets, trios, mandos and dulpods, the last two being traditional Goan songs. His most popular is the farewell Konkani evergreen hit Adeus Korchea Vellar (Now is the Time to Say Goodbye).
- Reginal Fernandes is credited with having penned some 100 songs set them to music. He wrote and presented many great tiatrs' (traditional Konkani songs) with the greats of the Konkani stage.
