= Queula =

- Census town
- Location in Goa, India Queula (India)
- Coordinates: 15.38°N 73.97°E
- Country: India
- State: Goa
- District: North Goa
- Elevation: 86 m (282 ft)

Population (2001)
  - Total: 5,452

Languages
  - Official: Konkani
- Time zone: UTC+5:30 (IST)
- Vehicle registration: GA
- Website: goa.gov.in

Queula is a census town in North Goa district in the Indian state of Goa.

== Geography ==
Queula is located at . It has an average elevation of 86 metres (282 feet).

== Demographics ==
As of 2001 India census, Queula had a population of 5452. Males constitute 52% of the population and females 48%. Queula has an average literacy rate of 80%, higher than the national average of 59.5%: male literacy is 85%, and female literacy is 74%. In Queula, 9% of the population is under 6 years of age.
