= Aquem =

- Census town
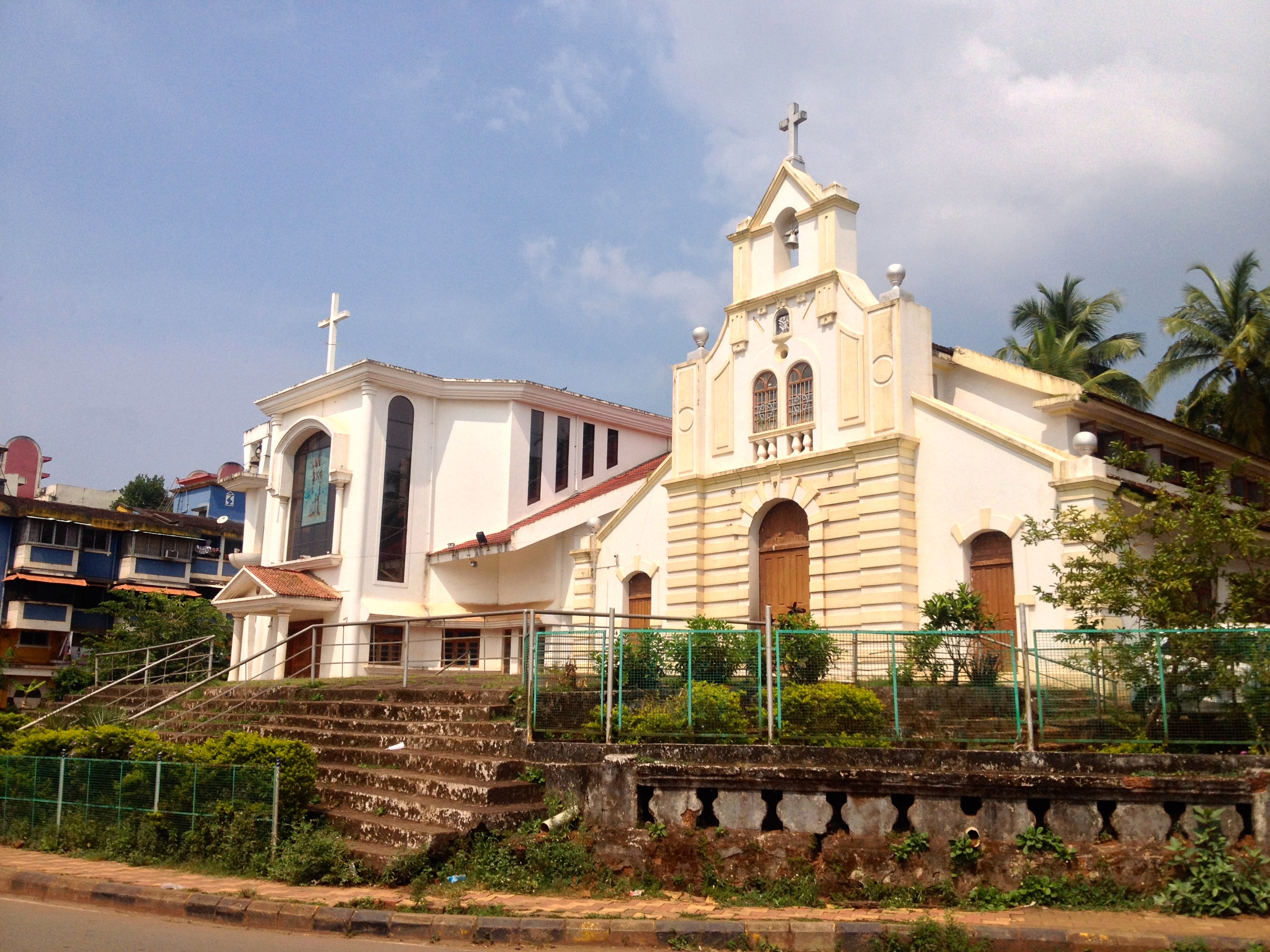
- St. Sebastian Church in Aquem
- Interactive map of Aquem
- Coordinates: 15.2601°N 73.982°E
- Country: India
- State: Goa
- District: South Goa

Population (2001)
  - Total: 4,985

Languages
  - Official: Konkani
- Time zone: UTC+5:30 (IST)
- Vehicle registration: GA
- Website: goa.gov.in

Aquem is a census town and a suburb of city of Margao in South Goa district in the state of Goa, India. It is home to the 6th Century Pandava caves which are likely Buddhist in origin.

== Demographics ==
As of 2001 India census, Aquem had a population of 4985. Males constitute 51% of the population and females 49%. Aquem has an average literacy rate of 70%, higher than the national average of 59.5%; with 55% of the males and 45% of females literate. 13% of the population is under 6 years of age.
