= Remmie Colaço =

Indian singer and actor (1925–2012)

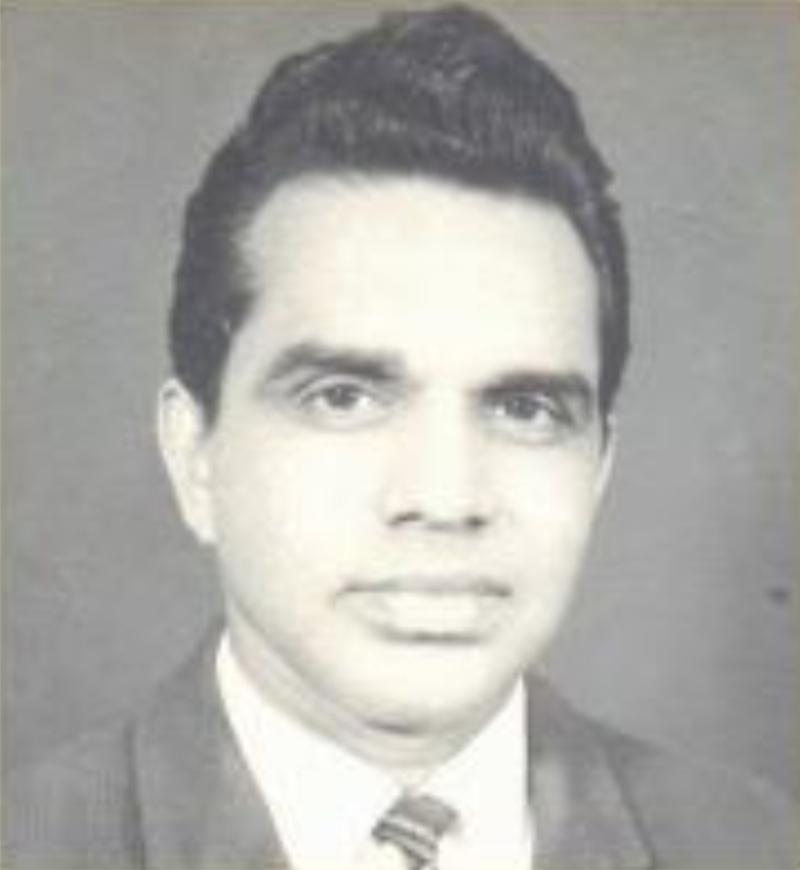
- Portrait of Colaço during his youth
- Born: Remédios Januário Colaço; 19 September 1925; Curchorem, Goa, Portuguese India, Portuguese Empire (now in India)
- Died: 22 March 2012 (aged 86); Aquem, Goa, India
- Education: St. Joseph English School, Wadala
- Occupations: Singer; composer; actor; playwright; theatre director
- Years active: c. 1940–2000s
- Notable work: Amchem Noxib (1963)
- Spouse: Maria Fernandes (m. 1960)
- Children: 3

Remédios Januário "Remmie" Colaço (19 September 1925 – 22 March 2012) was an Indian singer, composer, actor, playwright, and theatre director known for his work in Konkani films and tiatr productions.

== Early life ==
Remédios Januário Colaço was born on 19 September 1925, in Curchorem, Goa, which was then part of Portuguese India under the Portuguese Empire. His parents, João Sebastião Colaço and Carmelina Pinto, raised him in Curchorem, where he received primary education in Konkani and English at a local school in Khamamol, Curchorem. Colaço's affinity for music blossomed during his time in Sanvordem, Goa, where he later resided with his wife and children. Under the tutelage of Diogo Mestri at the parochial school in Sanvordem, he honed his musical skills, acquiring proficiency in reading and writing music as well as playing the violin. Demonstrating a keen interest in musical notations, Colaço actively participated in violin performances at the parish school.

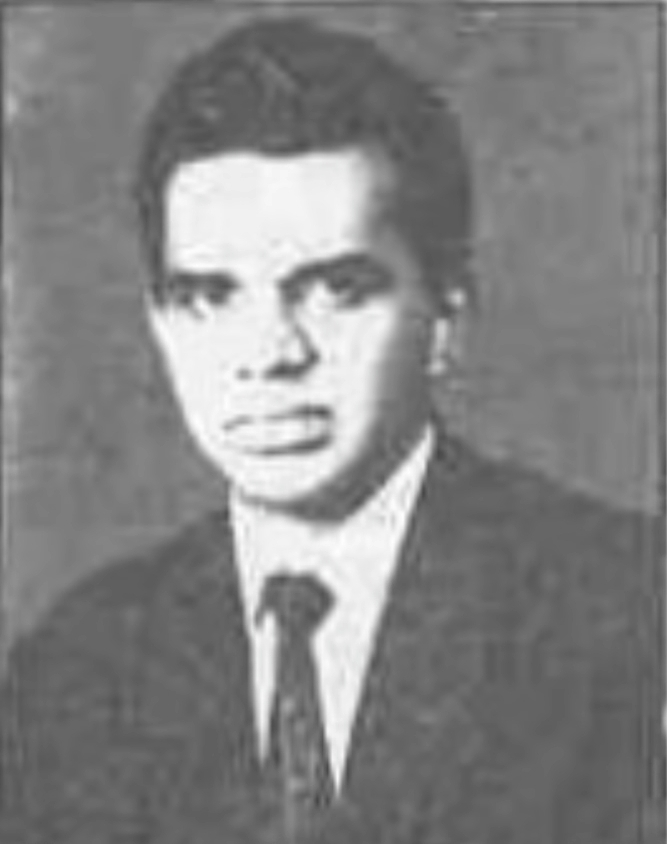
Colaço around the 1950s

At the age of 15, Colaço embarked on a journey to Bombay (now Mumbai) to pursue further studies, accompanied by his father. Initially residing in Sewri and later relocating to Dhobitalao, he enrolled as a student at St. Joseph English School in Wadala, Bombay. During his tenure, Colaço participated in singing competitions organized by the school, showcasing his musical talents. Furthermore, he exhibited his prowess in football, playing as a forward for several clubs in Bombay. While studying at St. Joseph's English School in Wadala, Colaço made his debut on the Konkani stage. Engaging in school concerts alongside his close compatriot, the Bollywood actor Shammi Kapoor, he began to establish himself as a performer.

== Career ==
Colaço resided in the neighborhood of Sewri, where a cultural group called the Jolly Boys of Sewree was active during that time. One of their endeavors was the staging of a theatrical performance known as a tiatr, specifically Bhagintlem Ful (The Garden Flower), which took place at Damodar Hall in Parel. Colaço, admired for his attractive appearance, was chosen by the director to assume the role of the leading lady in the tiatr. During this period, it was customary for men to portray female characters in tiatrs due to prevailing social taboos surrounding female actors. With the consent of Colaço's father, he was entrusted with the responsibility of portraying the heroine in the tiatr. His acting prowess resulted in acclaim, as evidenced by an article in the weekly publication Goa Times that praised Colaço's performance. Continuing their artistic endeavors, the Jolly Boys of Sewree organized another tiatr production called Sotachem Zoit (Truth Prevails), which was showcased at the St. Xavier's School Hall in Dhobitalao. This particular tiatr enlisted the participation of professional tiatrists such as Souza Ferrão, Dioginho D'Mello, Anthony Vaz, Kid Boxer, and Edward Almeida. Recognizing Colaço's talent, the group requested him to render two songs during the performance: a duet and a trio. The manner in which Colaço delivered these songs garnered admiration from the seasoned tiatrists in attendance, who extended their congratulations for his musical contributions.

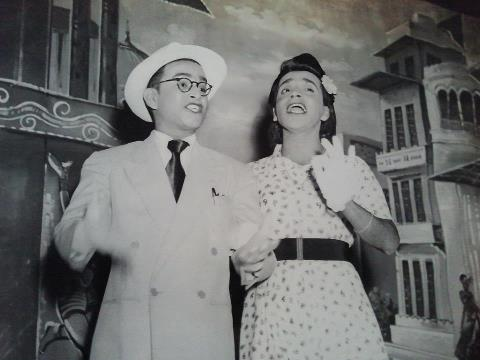
Alfred Rose (left) and Colaço (right) as a female character singing in a tiatr

Upon completing his studies in Sewri, Colaço relocated to Dhobitalao, where he formed a close friendship with Edward Almeida, an established professional tiatrist at the time. Almeida extended an opportunity to Colaço to take on a minor role in his own professional tiatr production titled Maim (Mother). Colaço was assigned a female character in this tiatr as well. Despite the role's limited significance, Colaço's portrayal captivated the audience. Additionally, he showcased his vocal prowess by delivering two duets, one alongside A. M. B. Rose and another with Edward Almeida himself. Both songs achieved popularity and acclaim. This marked a pivotal moment in Colaço's career, as it solidified his reputation as an actor adept at portraying female roles. Following his duet performances on stage, Colaço garnered the attention of C. Alvares, who expressed an interest in collaborating with him. Approximately one to two months later, Colaço secured a role in C. Alvares' tiatr production titled Tor ho Tiatrist?. The premiere of this production took place in 1944 at the Princess Theatre in Bhangwadi, Bombay. This particular opportunity represented a critical test for Colaço, as the grandeur and prestige associated with the theater presented a considerable challenge for newcomers Colaço made his debut on the Bhangwadi stage through this tiatr. Subsequently, he became a regular collaborator with C. Alvares, lending his voice to perform duets and continuing to portray female characters in C. Alvares' tiatrs. Colaço's talents also earned him roles in productions by other popular directors within the tiatr industry.

Colaço carved a distinct place for himself in the realm of Konkani songs and music. His unique style involved performing opening solos in English, which were then translated into Konkani. By the turn of the millennium, Colaço had participated in over 1000 tiatrs and delivered more than 600 of his own compositions. In addition to his vocal prowess, he showcased his talent as a composer, creating a repertoire of over 500 songs. Among his hits, "Ankwar Moriechem Dukh" remains a timeless classic in Konkani music and is frequently aired on All India Radio. Colaço's artistic journey extended beyond live performances. He recorded numerous tracks for Gramophone Company India, and his songs were released on audio cassettes as well. Some of his popular solo recordings included "Adlea Tempar," "Suberbai," "Tondd Dolle Kan," "Xirap," and "Mog Jezucho," while his collaborations with Mohana Cabral, Lourdes Lobo, and Philomena Braz on duets such as "Mhojea Gharant Naka," "Futtleli Boxi," and "Jivitacho Rukh" garnered acclaim. Drawing inspiration from Latin American, Austrian, and German music, Colaço's compositions reflected his diverse musical influences. He possessed the ability to compose melodies for his own songs, showcasing his proficiency in musical composition.

Colaço's impact extended beyond the realm of music. During the Goa Opinion Poll, he utilized his songs as a means to raise awareness among the Goan population. His performances alongside M. Boyer were cherished, often receiving encores. In addition to his musical contributions, Colaço wrote and directed numerous tiatrs, regularly unveiling new productions. Popular works in his repertoire included Satvo Sacrament (The Seventh Sacrament), Bhauponnancho Kaido (Rule of Brotherhood), Chouto Mandament, Sukh Tarvotteachem (Seafarer's Happiness), Zolmancho Gaum (Birth Village), Ghorachem Sukh (Part I & Part II), Don Kallzam (Two Hearts), Atancho Teomp (Present Generation), Mhuzo Kunhead, Atam Konn Sukhi (Who now is Happy?), and Ostorecho Mog (Woman's Love). Satvo Sacrament, his debut tiatr, received considerable acclaim when it premiered at Princess Theatre in Bombay on 15 April 1955. Colaço's artistic endeavors took him beyond India's borders. He had the opportunity to join a troupe that toured Nairobi, Mombasa, and Dar-es-Salaam in Africa, performing in shows such as Cunhead Ani Mana and New Fashion by Jacinto Vaz in 1957. In addition to Goa and Bombay, Colaço staged performances in Delhi, Karnataka, Gujarat, and embarked on tours to various countries, including Nairobi, Moshi, Dar-Es-Salaam, Tanga, Nakuru, Mombasa, as well as Bahrain, Kuwait, Dubai, Qatar, Muscat, and Abu Dhabi in the Persian Gulf. A fervent supporter of Goan music and culture, Colaço established a talent contest in Sanvordem, which became an annual event aimed at discovering and nurturing young talents. Through this initiative, several aspiring artists found their way to professional stages, owing their success to Colaço's efforts.

== Personal life ==
On the 6 May 1960, Colaço entered into matrimony with Maria Julieta Ligorina Fernandes, a homemaker originally from Mangalore but resided in Curchorem, Goa. The nuptials took place at the Sanvordem Church. The union resulted in the birth of three daughters: Maria (b. 1961), Sandra, and Vallerie.

== Death ==
On 22 March 2012, Colaço died at the Royal Hospital in Aquem, Margao, due to complications related to Alzheimer's disease. He had been admitted to the hospital two days prior for treatment. His funeral was held on 26 March, where he was mourned by a diverse assembly of people paying their final respects. The funeral mass was led by Fr. James Silva, the parish priest of Curchorem, with Fr. Trinco Menezes, the assistant parish priest, delivering the homily. Figures such as Tomazinho Cardozo, the then-president of the Tiatr Academy of Goa, tiatrist and advocate Mike Mehta, and former Curchorem MLA Domnick Fernandes were in attendance and offered their thoughts on the occasion. During the ceremony, a significant moment was the playing of Colaço's popular Konkani song, "Ankvar Moriechem Dukh."

=== Reactions ===
Colaço was remembered as a warm and genial individual, described by his close friend Pachao Pereira as a true gentleman. He was highly regarded by prominent figures in the world of tiatr and often called upon to mediate disputes among well-known tiatrists. Elvis Sequeira, writing in O Heraldo, lamented Colaço's passing as a profound loss for the tiatr community. As one of the few surviving tiatrists from the pre-liberation era, Colaço entertained audiences with his thought-provoking songs and performances. He also played a significant role in filling the void left by female artists who were reluctant to act in tiatrs. Colaço's legacy includes his morally uplifting songs, such as "Ankvar Moriechem Dukh" and "Mog Jezucho," and his successful tiatrs, including Ghorachem Sukh and Atancho Teomp, which continue to be cherished by tiatr enthusiasts, writes Sequeira.

== Legacy ==
In 2018, a street adjacent to the old Prashant theatre was dedicated in honor of Colaço as part of a series of initiatives commemorating 125 years of tiatr. The unveiling of the commemorative plaque was officiated by Curchorem MLA Nilesh Cabral. However, by October 2020, members of the tiatr community and enthusiasts had expressed dismay over the poor condition of the name plaque on Remmie Colaco Road in Curchorem, which had fallen off and was discovered in the nearby bushes. Tomazinho Cardozo, the head of the celebration committee, acknowledged the incident and assured The Times of India that the damaged plaque would be promptly restored. He attributed the damage to inclement weather and pledged to have the plaque repaired and reinstalled within the next two to three days.
