= Fatima D'Souza =

Indian actress and singer (born 1954)

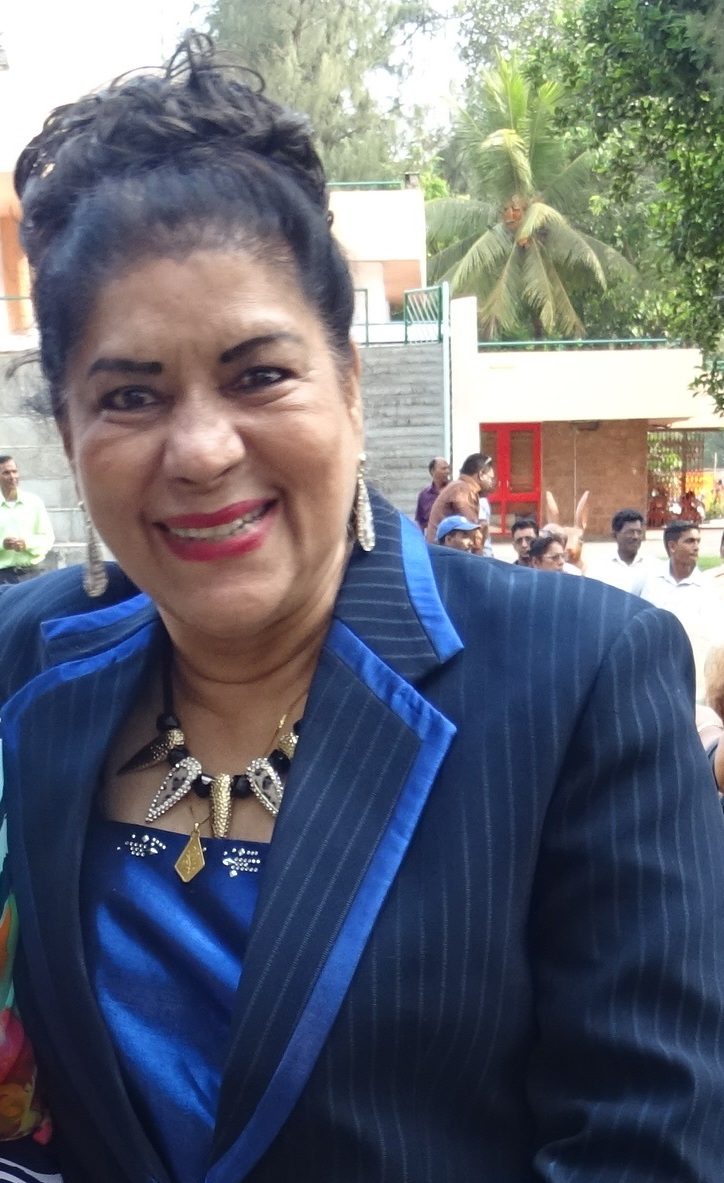
- D'Souza at the Kala Academy, 2017
- Born: Fatima Apolonia Claudina D'Souza; 15 November 1954 (age 71); Bombay, Bombay State, India
- Other names: English Madam; Fatima A.C.; Fatima D'Souza Devulkar
- Occupations: Actress; singer
- Years active: 1968–present
- Spouse: Anil Kumar (m. 1982; died 2015)
- Children: 1
- Father: A. K. D'Souza
- Relatives: Antonette Mendes (sister); Romeo Mendes (brother-in-law); Jose Rod (nephew-in-law)
- Website: facebook.com/fatima.dsouza.7792

Fatima Apolonia Claudina D'Souza (born 15 November 1954) is an Indian actress and singer known for her work in Konkani films and tiatr productions. Referred to as the "English Madam" by Konkani playwright John Claro, she made her debut on the Konkani stage as child Jesus in J. P. Souzalin's religious tiatr Saibinnicheo Sat Dukhi.

== Early life ==
Fatima Apolonia Claudina D'Souza, born on 15 November 1954, in Bombay (formerly part of Bombay State in India), belonged to a family deeply involved in the world of tiatr, a popular form of theater in the Konkan region and Goa. Her father, A. K. D'Souza, was a tiatr writer and director, organizing performances in Bombay and London during the 1950s. Her mother, Innocencia Alves, was a singer, while her sister, Antonette Mendes, made her mark as an artiste in tiatr and Konkani films. Growing up, D'Souza had the privilege of witnessing tiatr rehearsals taking place in her own home, surrounded by the art form that would later shape her career. D'Souza's introduction to acting came at the age of 6 or 7 when she took on the role of the child Jesus in J. P. Souzalin's tiatr production, with Shalini Mardolkar portraying the character of Mother Mary. She pursued her education at Barretto High School in Cavel, followed by enrollment at Davar's College and Eden Commercial College in Bombay.

A milestone in D'Souza's early career was her involvement in J. P. Souzalin's popular tiatr production titled Sat Dukhi, which graced the stage of the Princess Theatre in Bhangwadi, Bombay. In this production, D'Souza portrayed Jesus at the age of 12, during the scene where he goes missing in the temple. Shalini Mardolkar, in the role of Mother Mary, guided Jesus onto the stage. D'Souza lived in close proximity to the Princess Theatre in Marine Lines, and she frequently accompanied her sister to various shows. It was during one such occasion that J. P. Souzalin noticed her backstage and recognized her suitability to assume the role of the 12-year-old Jesus.

D'Souza's father, who was also a seaman, possessed a talent for writing tiatrs and composing songs, which greatly influenced his daughter. In the neighborhood of Chira Bazaar, Bombay, an annual celebration of St. Anthony's feast took place within their building. When D'Souza was 11 years old and attending school, she was entrusted with the responsibility of organizing a tiatr in her building known as Lisboa House in Chira Bazaar. To fulfill this task, she translated the English play Snow White and the Seven Dwarfs into her native language. Due to a limited number of participants, only five dwarfs were cast instead of the intended seven. D'Souza herself assumed the role of the Princess. Although the young actors portraying the dwarfs made errors, their efforts were well received by the audience, primarily consisting of patrons of the liquor vendors within the building. Generous contributions were collected after the performance, resulting in a substantial sum of money. The following day, a grand celebration was held to honor the participants' achievements.

Subsequently, D'Souza began showcasing her vocal abilities by singing songs at her school. Balthazar, a resident of the building, recognized her talent and took her along to sing at various club feasts. During this time, compensation came in the form of chocolates and gifts, rather than monetary remuneration. D'Souza's schoolmates at the municipal school in Chandanwadi included the Mendes brothers. They collaborated on a school production of the English play Goldilocks and the Three Bears. Additionally, D'Souza's sister Antonete was already established in the realm of tiatrs, and D'Souza often accompanied her to these performances, assisting with hairstyling and other tasks. As fate would have it, D'Souza began substituting for Antonete in her roles whenever she fell ill or was absent. This opportunity led to her receiving her first official role from the Mendes brothers in their tiatr production titled Irmanvancho Cheddo Mhozo Put. D'Souza showcased her talents in Bombay and also embarked on a visit to Goa in 1975.

== Career ==
The Goan clubs in Bombay organized tiatrs, a form of theater. D'Souza's sister Antonette Mendes, a highly sought-after actress, regularly performed on stage. During one of the shows by Remmie Colaço, D'Souza took over her sister's role. It was during this performance that she caught the attention of the Mendes Brothers. Impressed by her talent, they invited her to become their main actress in the production called Irmaumcho Cheddo Mhozo Put (My Brother's Son is my Son). D'Souza had to resign from her recently joined job to join the troupe, which was heading to Goa for performances. Working with the Mendes Brothers was a great experience, and the tiatr became a success, propelling D'Souza's on-stage career to new heights. She went on to collaborate with several Konkani directors, including M. Boyer, Prem Kumar, Remmie Colaço, Jacinto Vaz, and Robin Vaz. Some of the productions she acted in were Mog Kazar Divorce (Love, Marriage, Divorce), Bhurgim ani Bhangar (Children and Gold), Ordhi Bakhri (Half Bakri), Vauraddi (The Labourer), Atancho teomp, Don Kallzam (Two Hearts), Kunead ani Mana, Nitidar, Dev Bap (God the Father), Fatima Saibinnn (Our Lady of Fatima), Ekuch Rosto (The Only Way), Inglez Madam (English Madam), and Mhozo Khuris (My Cross).

One of her notable roles was in the tiatr titled Inglez Madam, written by playwright John Claro. D'Souza portrayed the lead character, a European lady who marries a Goan boy and moves to Goa. The play explored the cultural and social divide she encountered in her new surroundings. D'Souza's fluency in spoken English allowed her to convincingly portray the role of the English lady, which resonated with the audience. Her fair complexion also contributed to her appeal, drawing many visitors to the green room to catch a glimpse of the "English Lady." John Claro bestowed upon her the title of "English Madam" for her performance, a name that has remained associated with her throughout her career. D'Souza recalled a memorable incident during a comedic scene with Jacinto Vaz and M. Boyer. Due to her youthful nature, she accidentally referred to one of them as "uncle" instead of using his name in one of the dialogues. The audience burst into laughter, and Boyer added a humorous remark, stating that she had to call him "uncle" in the presence of a younger person.

In 1983, D'Souza had the opportunity to showcase her acting skills in M. Boyer's tiatr production titled Ekuch Rosto. During one of the performances, Prince Jacob attended the show and expressed his admiration for her talent. Following the tiatr, he approached D'Souza and invited her to act in his non-stop tiatr production. Initially hesitant due to concerns about the perceived status of the role, she eventually reconsidered, recognizing the opportunity to test her abilities and gain valuable experience. D'Souza accepted Jacob's offer and became part of his non-stop show called Panvdde (The Staircase), which consisted of a 103 performances. This successful collaboration paved the way for her involvement in other productions, including Rosario Rodrigues' Uzvadd Paloulo, which achieved a run of 100 shows. Subsequently, she worked with directors such as C. D'Silva, Jack Ferry, Mini Mario, Menin de Bandar, Ligorio Fernandes, Roseferns, Pascoal Rodrigues, John D'Silva, A. M. Pacheco, and others.

Konkani historian and singer Wilson Mazarello writes, D'Souza is known for her versatility as an actress, delivering performances across a wide range of roles. Her dedication to her craft is evident in her meticulous approach to studying and understanding each character she portrays. Audiences have consistently praised her acting abilities, and she is highly sought after by Konkani directors like M. Boyer, Prem Kumar, and Robin Vaz. In addition to her acting prowess, D'Souza is also a singer, often collaborating with artists such as Robin Vaz and Joe Rose to create duets and trios. Her vocal talents have been showcased on numerous audio cassettes, and she has even released two cassettes of her own. D'Souza's acting career extends beyond the tiatr stage. She has been cast in productions by directors such as Wilmix-Sharon, Mike Mehta, Joe Rose, Antonette Mendes, and H. Britton. Rosario Rodrigues, in particular, selected her for prominent roles in productions like Uzvadd Paloilo and Kudd, while Prince Jacob featured her in Paundde and Pangllo. D'Souza's talent has also been showcased on television, All India Radio (AIR), and in Konkani VCDs, including works such as Don Utram (Two Words), Friends, and the award-winning Ordem Chaddor (The Half Bedsheet), among others.

Initially, D'Souza's grasp of the Konkani language was anglicized. However, with the guidance of George de Agassaim, she put in the effort to learn to read and sing in Konkani. Additionally, her acting skills were honed under the mentorship of Prem Kumar, who imparted knowledge on acting techniques, effective communication, and self-presentation. Interestingly, it was during the rehearsals of Prem's production Ordhi Bhakri that D'Souza crossed paths with her future husband, Anil Kumar, and their romance blossomed. She went on to act in several of Anil's productions, including the pioneering horror tiatr Bhirantt (The Fear), as well as Saulli and Dubav Ek Uzo (Doubt is a Fire). Furthermore, D'Souza played a pivotal role in the revival of Ordhi Bhakri and Ekuch Rosto. Throughout her career, D'Souza has amassed a number of performances in various locations, including Goa, Mumbai, other parts of India, the UK, and the Gulf countries.

== Personal life ==
D'Souza entered into marriage with Anil Kumar, an actor and producer in the Konkani tiatr industry, on 3 December 1982. The couple had a son named Kenneth, who is currently based in Dubai. D'Souza acknowledges the presence of talented young individuals on the theatrical stage, recognizing them as the future of tiatr. She appreciates their dedication to honing their skills through workshops and emphasizes the importance of authentic costuming, citing the influence of figures such as Prem Kumar and M. Boyer.

On 6 February 2015, Anil died at the age of 63 due to complications stemming from diabetes. He had been receiving medical treatment at Goa Medical College in Bambolim, Goa since 26 January 2015, and had to undergo the amputation of his leg as a result of kidney complications. His funeral took place the following day at the Mathagramast Hindu Sabha Crematorium in Margao, Goa.

Born and raised in Bombay, D'Souza naturally developed fluency in English, and she finds it more comfortable to communicate in this language rather than Konkani, despite being a known figure in the Konkani theater community. According to the 2000 publication 100 Years of Konkani Tiatro, D'Souza originates from Goa Velha. As of the 2012 Directory of Tiatr Artistes, she currently resides in Fatorda, Goa.

== Selected stage works ==
Year	Title	Role	Notes	Ref
1960/1961	Sat Dukhi	Child Jesus	Debut as child artiste	
1965	Untitled tiatr	Princess Snow White	Translated work of Snow White and the Seven Dwarfs	
1960s/1970s	Goldilocks and the Three Bears			
1970s	Irmanvancho Cheddo Mhozo Put	Lead role		
1970s	Mog Kazar Divorce			
1974	Bhurgim ani Bhangar			
	Ordhi Bakhri			
	Vauraddi			
1975	Don Kallzam			
1986	Atancho teomp			
	Kunead ani Mana			
	Nitidar			
	Dev Bap			
	Fatima Saibinnn			
1983	Ekuch Rosto			
	Inglez Madam	European lady		
	Mhozo Khuris			
1980s	Panvdde		Non-stop tiatr	
	Uzvadd Paloulo	Main role		
	Kudd	Main role		
	Pangllo			
	Bhirantt			
	Saulli			
	Dubav Ek Uzo			
