= Tomazinho Cardozo =

Indian politician and writer (born 1946)

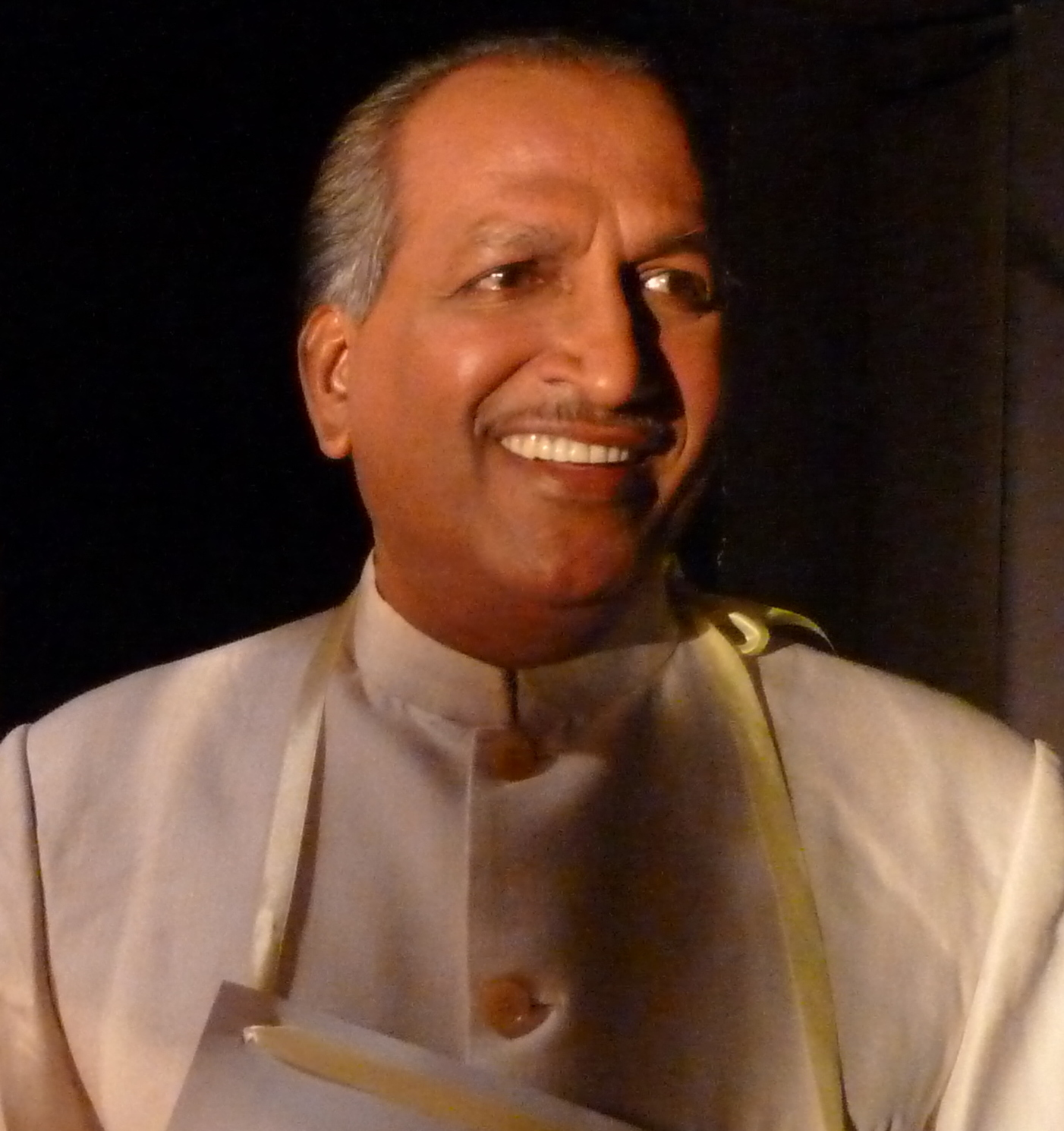
- Cardozo in 2011

Speaker of Goa Legislative Assembly
- In office 16 January 1995 – 14 June 1999
- Preceded by: Hassan Shaikh
- Succeeded by: Pratapsingh Rane

Member of the Goa Legislative Assembly
- In office 1994–1999
- Preceded by: Suresh Parulekar
- Succeeded by: Suresh Parulekar
- Constituency: Calangute

1st President of Tiatr Academy of Goa
- In office 6 January 2009 – 15 March 2012
- Preceded by: Office established
- Succeeded by: Prince Jacob

President of Dalgado Konknni Akademi
- In office 2004–2005
- Preceded by: Antimo Gomes
- Succeeded by: Wilson Mazarello
- In office 2007–2008
- Preceded by: Wilson Mazarello
- Succeeded by: Premanand Lotlikar
- In office 2017–2020
- Preceded by: Premanand Lotlikar
- Succeeded by: Vincy Quadros

Personal details
- Born: Lamberto Tomás Cardoso; 14 April 1946 (age 80) Pomburpa, Goa, Portuguese India
- Party: Indian National Congress
- Spouse: Irene Cardozo
- Occupation: Politician
- Profession: Politician; playwright; writer; teacher

Tomazinho Cardozo (born Lamberto Tomás Cardoso; 14 April 1946), is an Indian politician, playwright, writer (in Konkani and English), and teacher who served as a Speaker of the Goa Legislative Assembly from January 1995 to June 1999. He is known for his achievements in literature and tiatr in Goa.

== Career ==
=== Teaching and politics ===
Cardozo was in teaching for much of his life, having taught maths and science at the school level. He was the sarpanch of Candolim village panchayat for 22 years from 1977. In 1995 he was elected to the Goa Legislative Assembly from the Calangute constituency, which he served for five years. He made his debut on the Konkani tiatr stage in 1957, and wrote a play practically every year for the tiatr performance of the church feast.

=== Konkani plays ===
Among his popular Konkani plays are Kanttech Kantte (1980, whose title could be translated to Thorns, And Yet More Thorns). He founded the tiatr group Tiatr Mogi (Lovers of Tiatr), has been part of the formation of Kala Mogi (Lovers of Art) is also one of the founders of Kandolechim Kirnam, a prominent folk troupe which participated and won numerous awards including the prestigious mando festival award 11 times in the All Goa Mando festivals organized by Goa Cultural and Social Centre from 1974.

=== TAG mentor ===
He is considered to be a mentor of writers in Roman-script Konkani and has been active in groups like the Dalgado Konknni Akademi and the Tiatr Academy of Goa (TAG). Cardozo was appointed president of the Tiatr Academy of Goa in February 2011. He has won awards as the best sarpanch (1983), for teaching (2003), and literature (2009).

== Legacy ==
A road in Candolim is named after him.
