= Tiatr Academy of Goa =

State cultural body in Goa, India

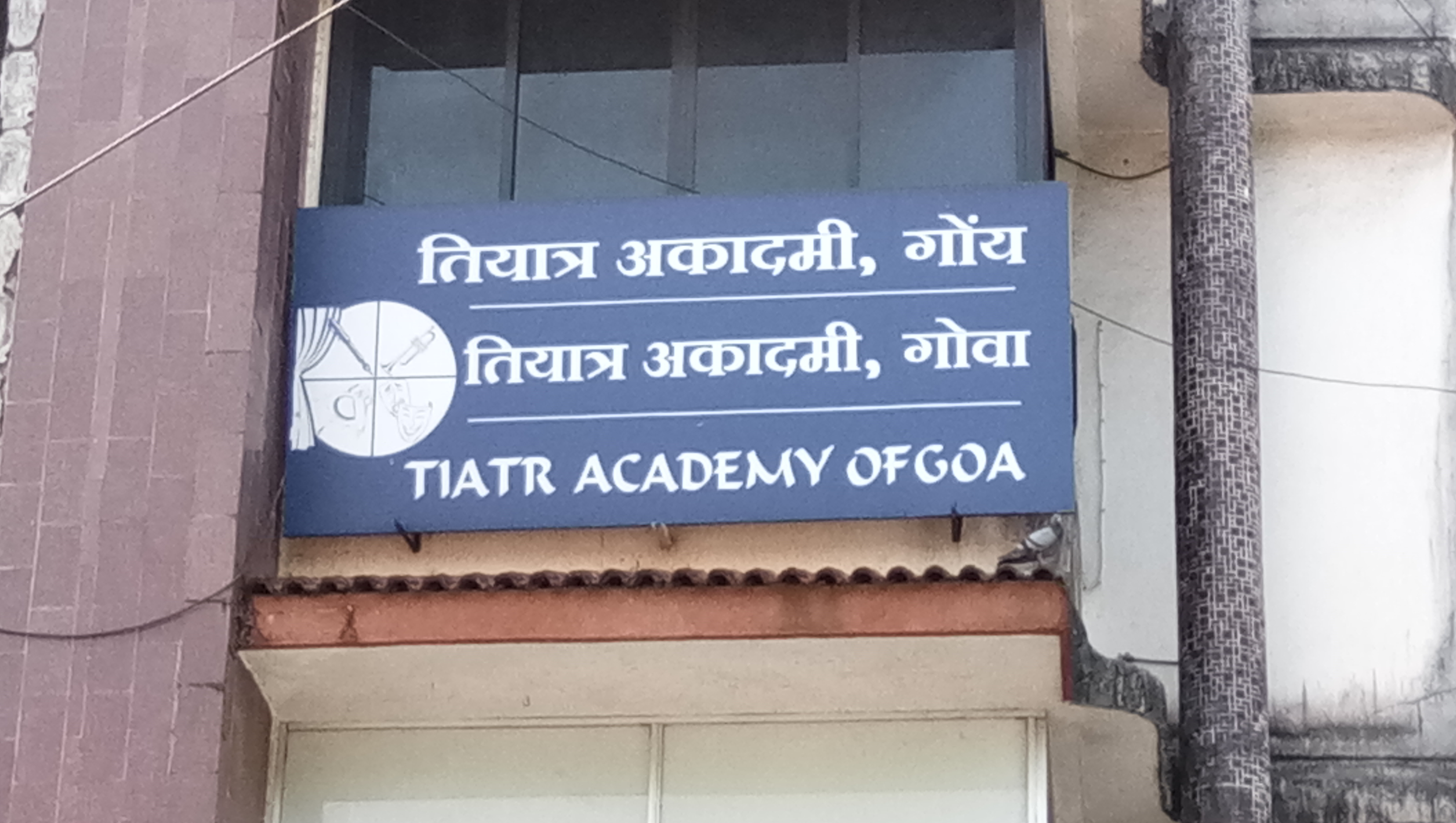
- Tiatr Academy of Goa office at St. Inez, Panaji.
- Abbreviation: TAG
- Formation: January 16, 2009; 17 years ago
- Type: Governmental organization
- Purpose: Foster and develop Tiatr and its dances, music, songs and literature; especially the Konkani Literature in Roman script as well as through them the cultural unity of Goa as well as India.
- Headquarters: Campal, Goa, India
- Location: Panaji, Goa, India
- Official language: Konkani
- President: Anthony Barbosa (since 2024)
- Main organ: General Council
- Parent organisation: Directorate of Art & Culture, Government of Goa
- Website: Official website

The Tiatr Academy of Goa (TAG) is a government body established by the Government of Goa in 2009 during the tenure of Digambar Kamat as the Chief Minister of Goa. The academy was inaugurated on 16 January 2009 in Margao at the hands of Konkani singer Master Vaz The academy's aim is to foster and develop tiatr and its associated dances, music, songs and literature; especially the Konkani literature in Roman script as well as focus on the cultural unity of Goa as well as India.

== History ==
The tiatr has a rich history of over 125 years and is an important form of theatre in the Konkani language. The first tiatr Italian Bhurgo was performed in 1892 in Bombay.

There had been a demand from lovers of tiatr and the artists that the Government of Goa take steps to protect and promote the theatre form. During the tenure of Digambar Kamat as the Chief Minister of Goa, a committee was established under Chief Minister Kamat's chairmanship for the purpose of drafting a constitution for the proposed 'Tiatr Academy'. The committee included Tomazinho Cardozo, Premanand Sangodkar, Fatima D'Souza, Wilson Mazarello, Prince Jacob and Prasad Lolayekar (Director, Directorate of Art & Culture of the Government of Goa) as members.

The committee drafted the constitution and the Academy was registered under the Societies Registration Act, 1860 under No. 85/Goa/2009 on 2 February 2009. The Government of Goa appointed Tomazinho Cardozo as the first President of the Academy and the Academy was inaugurated on 16 January 2009.

== Administration ==
The general council and the president of the Tiatr Academy of Goa are appointed by the Government of Goa for a term of three years. In addition to ex officio members like the Secretary and the Directror of Art & Culture, Government of Goa; the Council also other members and organisations who work in the field of tiatr. The term of the General Council shall be three years.

== Activities ==
The Academy organises various programmes and events for the promotion and conservation of tiatr. The Academy organises competitions and festivals such as the Children's Tiatr Festival and the Popular Tiatr Festival. The Academy also organises jubilees of various tiatr actors. The Tiatr Academy of Goa organises workshops on tiatr in educational institutions across Goa to promote awareness about tiatr among the students.

The Academy also has various schemes such as oral documentation of tiatr, documentation of tiatr through research, etc. The Academy organise special programmes every month called Somplolea Tiatristancho Ugddas to remember the tiatr artists of yesteryears. The Academy also organises a monthly programme where tiatr artists of repute are invited to interact with tiatr lovers.

The Tiatr Academy of Goa has published several books regarding tiatr. The Academy confers Lifetime Contribution Awards and Khell Tiatr Awards.

== List of presidents ==
List of presidents of the Tiatr Academy of Goa
S.No.	Name	From	To
1	Tomazinho Cardozo	January 6, 2009	March 15, 2012
2	Prince Jacob	July 30, 2012	September 3, 2015
3	Comedian Agostinho	September 4, 2015	unknown
