= M. Boyer =

Indian singer and composer (1930–2009)

- Aguiar in his later years
- Born: Manuel Santana Aguiar; 11 October 1930; Marcaim, Goa, Portuguese India
- Died: 30 May 2009 (aged 78); Raia, Goa, India
- Citizenship: India (from 1961)
- Occupations: Singer; composer; playwright; director
- Years active: c. 1948–2000s
- Awards: Sangeet Natak Akademi Award (1994); Padma Shri (2005)

Manuel Santana Aguiar (11 October 1930 – 30 May 2009), known professionally as M. Boyer, was an Indian singer, composer, playwright, and theatre director known for his work in Konkani films and tiatr (musical theatre) productions. He wrote, directed, and produced more than 35 plays, participated in over 5,000 performances, and composed and sang more than 1,000 songs. Aguiar also performed in major Indian cities, as well as in London, East Africa, and the Middle East.

Aguiar made a significant contribution to the Konkani stage, thereby enriching it and leaving his special mark on it. He has also been a source of inspiration for many other artists. He often left the stage to thundering applause from his audiences and pleas for an encore performance.

== Career ==
Aguiar believed that drama should not be just mere entertainment but should be an instrument to educate and inspire people to a better life. He mentioned about always emphasizing the message of morality, peace and harmony in his plays, some of which include Chintnam Zalim Sopnam, Sounsar Sudorlo, Bhurgim Ani Bhangar Adim Tem Atam Hem, Ghor Dukhi Gaum Sukhi, Mog, Kazar, Divorce, Kazari Put Xezari. One tiatr which was notable was Ekuch Rosto, based on communal harmony shared between the two major religions of Goa. Apart from his contributions to tiatrs, Aguiar lobbied for the preservation of Goan identity. He believed that Konkani alone could strengthen the foundations of Goan identity.

== Personal life ==
Aguiar was originally from Marcaim in Pondá, and later moved to Raia. His parents were Sebastiao Floriano Aguiar and Mariquinha Luis. He was a talented actor from an early age, and he wrote and presented his first play Rinkari (Debtor) at the age of 18. As a young boy, his parents and school principal tried to discourage him from pursuing his passion but despite all their attempts, he never gave up his love for the stage.

== Awards and honours ==
Aguiar was honoured for his distinguished services at the hands of Zail Singh, then-President of India on the occasion of the Silver Jubilee Celebration of Goa's Liberation in 1986. In the year 1984–85, Aguiar was conferred with the State Cultural Award by the erstwhile Government of Goa, Daman and Diu.

Aguiar was the recipient of the 1994–95 Sangeet Natak Akademi Award at the hands of the then President of India, Shankar Dayal Sharma. He was the first Konkani stage artiste to receive this award. He was then awarded the Padma Shri, fourth-highest civilian award in 2005 at the hand of former President of India, A. P. J. Abdul Kalam.
