= Simon C. Fernandes =

Indian medical practitioner and politician (1909–1983)

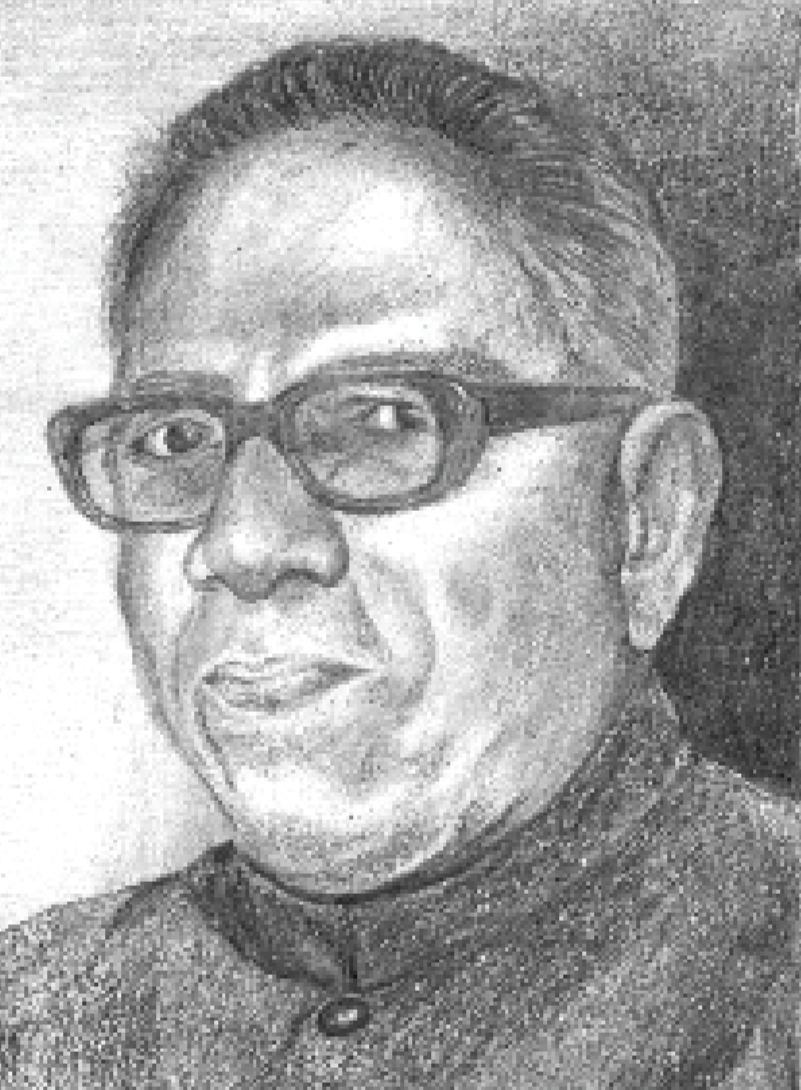
- Portrait of Fernandes during his later years

Mayor of Bombay
- In office 4 April 1957 – 13 May 1957
- Preceded by: Abdul Kader Salebhoy
- Succeeded by: M. V. Donde

Municipal councillor for Bombay Municipal Corporation
- In office 1948–1973
- Constituency: Dhobi Talao

Personal details
- Born: Simon Cypriano Fernandes; 10 October 1909 Calangute, Goa, Portuguese India, Portuguese Empire
- Died: 27 August 1983 (aged 73) Bombay, Maharashtra (now Mumbai), India
- Citizenship: Indian
- Party: United Goans Party
- Spouse: Helena Fernandes
- Children: 2
- Education: Bachelor of Medicine, Bachelor of Surgery
- Occupation: Medical practitioner; journalist; playwright; director; theatre critic; politician
- Known for: Role in Goa liberation movement and Goa Opinion Poll
- Committees: Chairman of Improvements Committee; Constitutory and special committee of Bombay Municipal Corporation
- Nickname: Simon Cipriano Fernandes

Simon Cypriano Fernandes (10 October 1909 – 27 August 1983), popularly known as Dr. Simon C. Fernandes, was an Indian medical practitioner, journalist, playwright, theatre director, theatre critic, freedom fighter, pianist, orator, and politician who served as the mayor of Bombay from April to May 1957 in Bombay State. A long-time councilman, he served as a councillor of the Dhobi Talao constituency for over two decades, having been first elected in 1948 till 1973. Apart from his political career, Fernandes was known for his contributions as a journalist in post-independence India and as a playwright of Konkani tiatrs staged in Bombay, British India and Portuguese Goa.

== Early life ==
Simon Cypriano Fernandes was born on 10 October 1909 in the town of Calangute, Goa which at the time was located within the Portuguese colonial territory of Portuguese India, part of Portuguese Empire (now located in India). Fernandes spent the first approximately 25 years of his life residing in the Goa region. In 1934, Fernandes and his family relocated to the city of Bombay, which was then part of the Bombay Presidency under British colonial rule (now Mumbai, Maharashtra, India). The family settled in the Cooper Building in the Dhobi Talao neighborhood of Bombay. Prior to 1958, Fernandes completed his medical training and earned the Bachelor of Medicine, Bachelor of Surgery (MBBS) degree, though the precise year of this achievement is unclear from the available information.

== Career ==
Fernandes was a 20th-century medical practitioner and journalist based in Bombay, British India. In addition to his work as a doctor, Fernandes held editorial roles at two Bombay-based publications - The Goan Tribune, an English-language newspaper, and The Goa Times, a Konkani-language newspaper. Fernandes made significant contributions to the development of Konkani theater, known as tiatr. He was responsible for creating and overseeing several tiatr shows, which involved adapting works from English playwright William Shakespeare into the Konkani language. The shows took place in Bombay and Portuguese Goa, highlighting the skills of popular tiatr performers. Fernandes Konkani translations included works such as Venice Xaracho Vepari (The Merchant of Venice), Zoit Khorkhos Ostorechem (The Taming of the Shrew), Romeo and Juliet, among others.

Fernandes was known for his contributions to Konkani literature through the creation of a variety of religious plays, including works like Pontius Pilate and Bernadette of Lourdes, among others. Additionally, he authored original Konkani tiatrs, with his play Poskem (Adopted) becoming a classic in the genre. Beyond his creative output, Fernandes made significant contributions to the advancement of Konkani theater by actively engaging in critical analysis and commentary on tiatr productions in his newspaper writings. Through his efforts, he aimed to foster growth and refinement within the art form. Fernandes administered a medical facility in the Chandanwadi sector of Bombay while living in the Sonapur region near Princess Street in Dhobitalao, Bombay.

Fernandes was a Goan doctor who had a passion for theatre and the performing arts. He drew inspiration from the literary works of William Shakespeare and went on to create the "Goan Dramatic Amateur Group", which featured popular Konkani artists such as Valente Mascarenhas, C. Alvares, Ophelia Cabral, Cyriaco Dias, Diogo Mascarenhas, Anthony De Sa, Vincent de Saligão, Joe Louis and Joe Rose. Fernandes also authored several tiatrs, which are traditional Konkani plays, focusing on religious themes. Some of his best-known works include Judas Iscariot, Sant Sebastiaum, Fatima Saibinn, and Santa Philomena, all of which were very popular with audiences. In addition to his theatrical writings, Fernandes was an author who produced written works in both the Konkani and English languages. Fernandes significantly impacted the evolution and enrichment of the Konkani language and the tiatr theatrical tradition in Goa through his critical analysis and commentary.

Fernandes was considered a respected and influential figure in those aforementioned cultural spheres. He was also actively involved in the Goan independence movement. During the Goa Opinion Poll, he founded a chapter of the United Goans Party (UGP) in Bombay and journeyed to various cities like Poona, Ahmedabad, Delhi, and Calcutta to educate and garner backing from the Goan community dispersed across these areas against the potential amalgamation of Goa with Maharashtra. Beyond his literary and political pursuits, Fernandes was a pianist and a proficient orator in both Konkani and English. He was a popular choice as a toastmaster at Goan weddings, showcasing his skills in music and public speaking on various occasions.

Fernandes was a popular journalist and political figure active in Bombay (now Mumbai), India during the mid-20th century. From 1956 to 1965, he worked as an editor for two weekly publications based in Bombay - The Goan Tribune and Goa Times Press. He would operate from his office situated at 1st Marine Street in Bombay for The Goan Tribune. His journalistic work focused on reporting general-news and covering current affairs. In addition to his career in media, Fernandes was involved in local politics in Bombay. In 1948, he secured his initial election to the Bombay Municipal Corporation, representing the Dhobi Talao constituency. Fernandes would go on to serve continuously as a municipal councilor for the next 25 years, until 1973. During his tenure, he held several leadership positions, including serving as the mayor of Bombay for a period of 39 days from 4 April to 13 May 1957. Fernandes also chaired the Improvements Committee and participated in several statutory and special committees of the municipal corporation during his tenure.

Beyond his work in journalism and politics, Fernandes was a supporter of the Konkani language and Goan cultural heritage. In 1982, he had the honor of welcoming and introducing the chief guest at an event reviewing the progress of a Konkani-language institute. The institute's president, A. J. Souza-Roy, noted the widespread migration of Goans to cities and regions across the world during this period. Fernandes himself was recognized as being among the select few playwrights who carried on the legacy of the popular Konkani theater artist J. P. Souzalin. Fernandes contributed significantly to the diverse realms of Goan artistic innovation within the artistic community of Bombay. Throughout his multifaceted career, Fernandes made contributions to the public life and cultural fabric of Bombay, leaving an impact on the city's Goan community and beyond.

== Personal life ==
Fernandes was a Catholic by faith and a philanthropist who was known for his religious devotion and contributions to religious infrastructure in the city of Bombay (now Mumbai). Fernandes was recognized for his amiable and religious character, displaying a strong commitment to Mother Mary and the Holy Cross located at the Cross Maidan in Bombay. His significant contributions included obtaining consent from the Bombay Municipal Corporation for the erection of a canopy around the Holy Cross and designing the architectural plans for this structure. In 1968, Fernandes published an advertisement in the India News and Features Alliance (INFA) publication, where he expressed his editorial policy as an independent nationalist. Fernandes was married to Helena, and together they had two sons late Joseph, a medical practitioner, and Ivor, a retired individual. After Helena Fernandes' death in 2008, a property she had owned in Penha de Franca, Goa prior to 1976 was distributed among Ivor, his spouse, and Joseph' children.

"Voilo Wado" was the property that was owned by Helena, the wife of Fernandes. In September 2022, plans were announced for a new building project called Arc Supremous to be constructed on this property. The Voilo Wado property was previously sold in August 2021 for ₹99 lakh (equivalent to ₹1.1 crore or US$120,000 in 2023). The sale proceeds were divided among Ivor and his children. The property was purchased by Arc Builders, a partnership firm based in Porvorim, Goa and owned by Shabbir Shaikh and Dolcy. Fernandes held a career as a medical practitioner in addition to other professional pursuits. He and his family resided at the Cooper Building in the Dhobi Talao area of Bombay. Fernandes was also involved in theater and politics, and was known for his charitable work. Fernandes died on 27 August 1983, aged 73 in Bombay.
