= Dennis Simoes =

Portuguese theatre actor and female impersonator

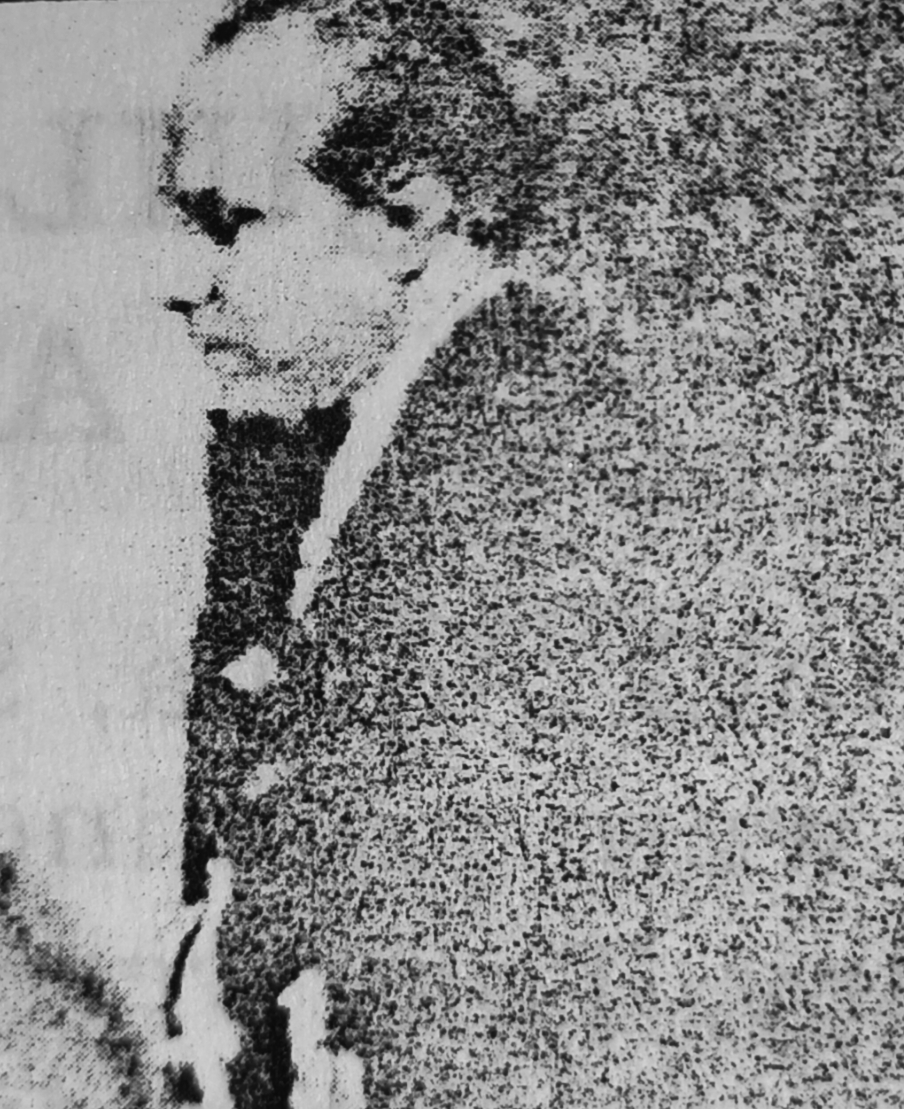
- Simoes performing in the tiatr Gorb
- Born: c. 1901; Candolim, Goa, Portuguese India
- Died: c.1957 (aged 55–56); Bombay, Bombay State, India
- Other names: D. Simoes
- Occupations: Theatre actor; female impersonator
- Years active: 1930s–c. 1957
- Spouse: Carlota Simoes

Dennis Simoes (c. 1901 – c. 1957) was a Portuguese theatre actor and female impersonator known for his work in tiatr productions.

== Career ==
Simoes was introduced to the realm of commercial tiatr, a distinctive form of Goan musical theater, by playwright Aleixinho De Candolim during one of his productions. This encounter marked the beginning of Simoes' involvement in several tiatrs led by the Konkani singer Minguel Rod. It was through his collaborations with Minguel Rod that Simoes gained prominence as an actor, captivating audiences in Goa and leaving an impression on the tiatr community. Minguel Rod, recognizing Simoes' abilities, astutely crafted roles that perfectly complemented his skills within the framework of his tiatrs. Simoes garnered acclaim for his portrayal of a bhattkar (landlord) in Minguel Rod's Intruz vo Carnaval (Intruz or Carnival), a role that elevated his status and continues to be revered to this day. Throughout his career, Simoes assumed a diverse range of characters, including bhattkars (landlords), fathers, and gouio (simpleton). One notable performance included his portrayal of a simpleton bridegroom in Farikponn (Amends), a tiatr by the Konkani actor Anthony De Sa. Simoes also exhibited versatility by embodying female characters, demonstrating his finesse as a female impersonator. His portrayal of a simpleton bride in the Konkani film actor C. Alvares' Conn To Mali? (Who is that gardener?) further solidified his popularity and recognition. Moreover, Simoes had the opportunity to collaborate with a host of popular artists in the tiatr Gorb (Pride), a production scripted and directed by the Goan theater actor and singer P. Nazareth (Peter Anthony Nazareth). The ensemble cast featured figures such as the Konkani comedian Jacinto Vaz, singer Remmie Colaço, and the film actor Shaikh.

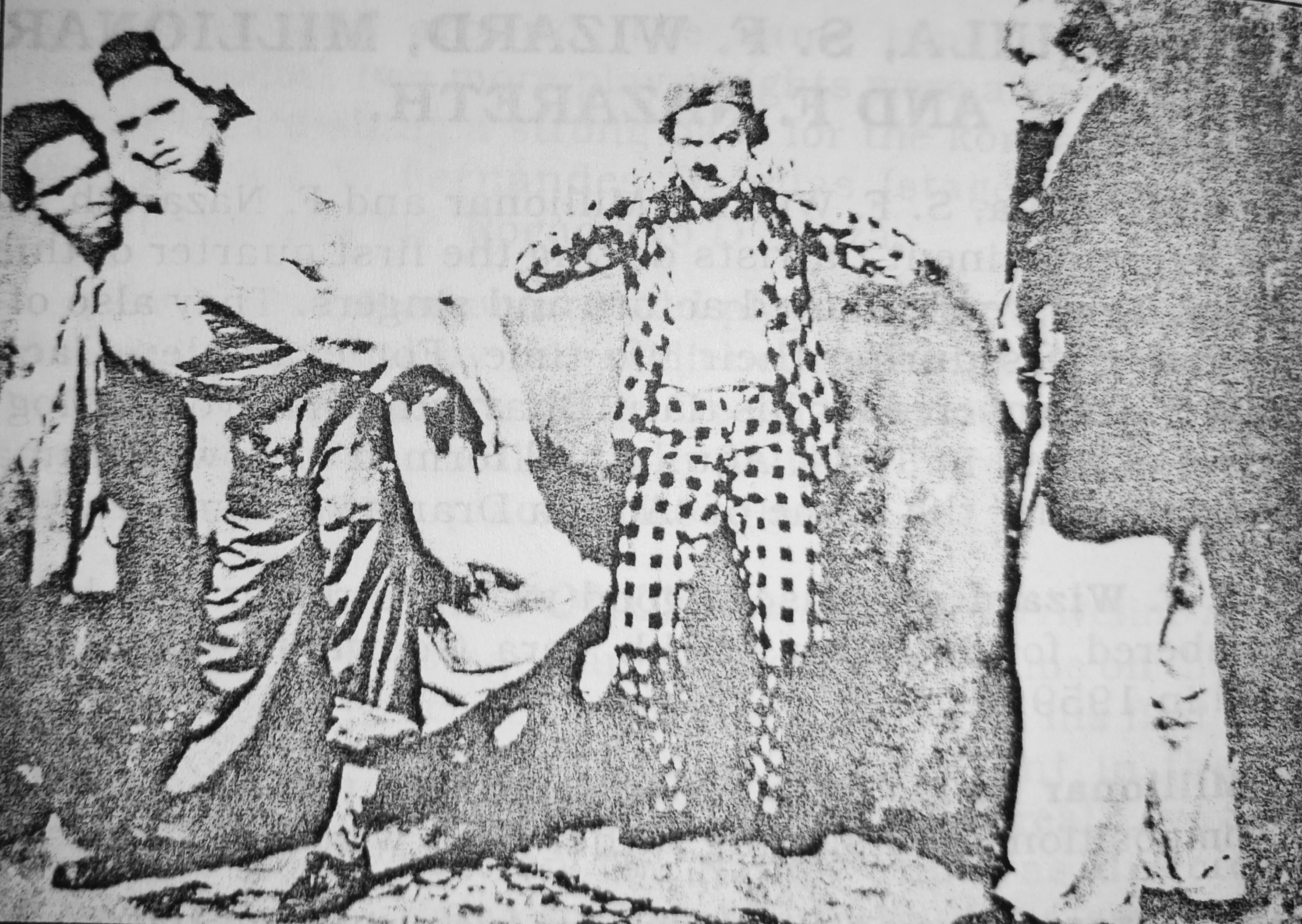
From left to right: Jacinto Vaz, Remmie Colaço, Shaikh, and Simoes during a performance in Gorb tiatr.

Simoes was among the early Goan Konkani tiatrists who played a pivotal role in advancing the Konkani tiatr tradition throughout the first half of the 20th century. During this period, various tiatrists had varying degrees of longevity and made significant contributions as playwrights and song composers. Simoes was a member of the trio known as Kid-Young-Rod, known for their trio songs that drew large crowds to the theaters. Any tiatr production presented under the banner of Kid (Kid Boxer)-Young (Young Menezes)-Rod (Minguel Rod) guaranteed a sold-out performance. Simoes collaborated with fellow members of this group, including Master Vaz, Edward Almeida, Miss Marekin, C. Pereira, Miss Julie, Miss Estrela, and Cruz Jazzwala. Over time, some members departed, and their positions were filled by Valente Mascarenhas, Joao Inas, P. Nazareth, and Andrew Ferns. Simoes actively participated in the early phase of tiatr from 1892 to the 1930s, a period recognized as the pioneering era by professor André Raphael Fernandes of Goa University, an author on the subject. During this period, playwrights were the trailblazers and the first to reap the rewards. Konkani writer and historian Wilson Mazarello, in an article for The Times of India, acknowledges Simoes as one of the early Konkani tiatrists who captivated audiences in both Bombay (now Mumbai) and Goa with his theatrical performances.

== Personal life ==
Dennis Simoes, born in 1901 in the town of Candolim in Bardez taluka, Goa, had a relatively obscure early and personal life, with limited accessible information through online and print sources. During that period, Goa was under Portuguese rule as part of Portuguese India during the Portuguese Empire (now located in India). Later in life, Simoes relocated to Bombay, which was part of Bombay Presidency in British India and is presently recognized as Mumbai, Maharashtra, India. In Bombay, he entered into a marriage with Carlota Simoes, a well-known dixtticarn (exorcist or individual specializing in expelling evil spirits) from the Byculla locality in South Bombay, now referred to as South Mumbai, India. Simoes spent the remainder of his life in Bombay until his death in 1957.

== Selected stage works ==
Year	Title	Role	Notes	Ref
Possibly 1930s	Untitled tiatr	Unnamed role	Professional debut	
Before 1947	Intruz vo Carnaval	Bhattkar (landlord)		
	Farikponn	Simpleton bridegroom		
1945	Conn To Mali?	Female role; simpleton bride		
1940s/1950s	Gorb	Unnamed role		
