= Caiti =

Indian make-up artist (1941–2017)

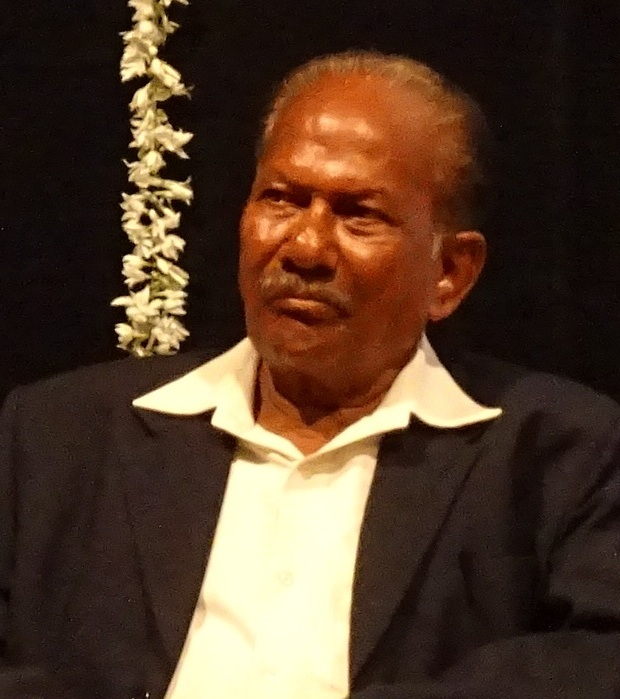
- Pinto at Kala Academy, 2015
- Born: Caetano Francisco Pinto; 29 January 1941; Vanxim, Goa, Portuguese India, Portuguese Empire (now in India)
- Died: 5 November 2017 (aged 76); Mumbai, Maharashtra, India
- Occupation: Make-up artist
- Years active: 1961–2010s
- Awards: TAG's "Lifetime Contribution Award" (2009)

Cajetan Francis Pinto (born Caetano Francisco Pinto; 29 January 1941 – 5 November 2017), known mononymously as Caiti, was an Indian make-up artist who worked on the Konkani stage.

== Early life ==
Caetano Francisco Pinto was born on 29 January 1941 in the island of Vanxim, Goa in a Goan Catholic family. Vanxim was part of Portuguese India during the time of the Portuguese Empire. Pinto's father, Manoel Vicente Pinto, hailed from the island of Chorão and served as an employee of a company. His mother, Maria Angelina de Souza, originated from Aldonã and fulfilled the role of a homemaker. As the third child in a family of four siblings, Pinto grew up alongside his elder brothers Ricardo (born in 1936 in Bombay) and Luis (born in 1934). An additional sibling, who remains unnamed, was born in 1939. Following the completion of his education in Goa, Pinto ventured to Bombay, where he pursued specialized training in typewriter mechanics. Since his early years, Pinto fostered an affection for tiatr, a distinctive form of Goan musical theater.

During his time in Bombay, he made a concerted effort to attend tiatr performances, seizing every available opportunity to immerse himself in this cultural tradition. Eager to explore the intricacies of the art form, he frequently visited the green room, where he keenly observed the meticulous application of makeup on the actors. Pinto honed his skills as a tiatr make-up artist. His expertise allowed him to enhance the appearances of several tiatrists, ensuring that their physical portrayals aligned with their respective characters on the theatrical stage.

== Career ==
During the year 1961, Pinto commenced his collaboration with Valente Mascarenhas (1925–1999), a make-up artist who later transitioned into becoming a Konkani actor. Their partnership primarily revolved around providing makeup assistance to tiatrists (performers in a distinctive Goan musical theater form) based in Bombay (now known as Mumbai). A turn of events occurred when Valente was unable to fulfill his obligations for a tiatr performance, leading Konkani comedian Anthony Mendes to request Pinto's support as a replacement. This marked the emergence of Pinto as a make-up artist in his own right. Over the course of his career, Pinto extended his makeup services to a wide array of Konkani tiatrists from earlier generations. Known figures within the Konkani tiatr realm, including C. Alvares, M. Boyer, Remmie Colaço, Prem Kumar, Alfred Rose, Bab Peter, Chris Perry, Kid Boxer, and Robin Vaz, consistently sought Pinto's expertise in various locations such as Goa, Bombay, and beyond. Pinto's makeup artistry left a mark on several popular tiatrs, including Duddvanchem Sukh (Happiness of Money), Kednam Udetolo Tho Dis (When Will That Day Come?), and Vavraddi (Labourer).

On 8 February 2014, Pinto assumed the role of makeup artist for a Goan tiatr organized by the Vasai Konkani Welfare Association (VKWA). The theatrical production, written and directed by Tony Martins, took place at the YMCA Hall in Manickpur, Vasai, Maharashtra. Pinto's expertise extended beyond makeup application, as he also performed hairstyling for the tiatr artists. His contributions to the field of tiatr were further acknowledged when he shared his insights and experiences in Dr. Kyoko Matsukawa's scholarly article titled "Tiatr's Bombay Days," which was published on Sahapedia in 2016. Pinto stood alongside professionals such as Valente Mascarenhas, Camilo Pinto of Aldona, Xavier Mascarenhas of Vasco da Gama, Goa, Premanand Pole, Zeferin Silveira from Calangute, Jocky de Curtorim, Mary Vaz, and C. D'Silva as one of the select few make-up artists on the Konkani stage during the 20th century.

== Personal life ==
After finishing his training as a typewriter mechanic, Pinto settled in Dhobitalao, Bombay. The 2012 Directory of Tiatr Artistes mentioned that he lived at the Grand Club of Vanxim in Dhobitalao. Pinto worked as a typewriter mechanic by trade but found his true passion in being a tiatr make-up artist. Pinto received a monthly financial grant of ₹2,500 (equivalent to ₹5,600 or US$66 in 2023) from the Government of Goa under the Kala Samman Scheme in recognition of his contributions to the field of art and culture. The scheme aimed to support senior artists facing financial difficulties. Pinto was one of the artists chosen for this honor in the period of 2010–11, starting from September 2010. On 5 November 2017, Pinto died in Mumbai, Maharashtra, at the age of 76.

== Awards ==
Pinto received several awards recognizing his contributions to the art form. In 2009, the Tiatr Academy of Goa honored him with the "Lifetime Contribution Award". Furthermore, on 17 November 2016, he was celebrated by the 125th Anniversary of Tiatr Celebrations Committee in Mumbai for his dedication to tiatr. Pinto was also acknowledged with the Kala Gaurav Puraskar for the year 2016–2017 specifically for his work in tiatr make-up.
