= Joe Rose (Konkani actor) =

Indian actor and singer (born 1946)

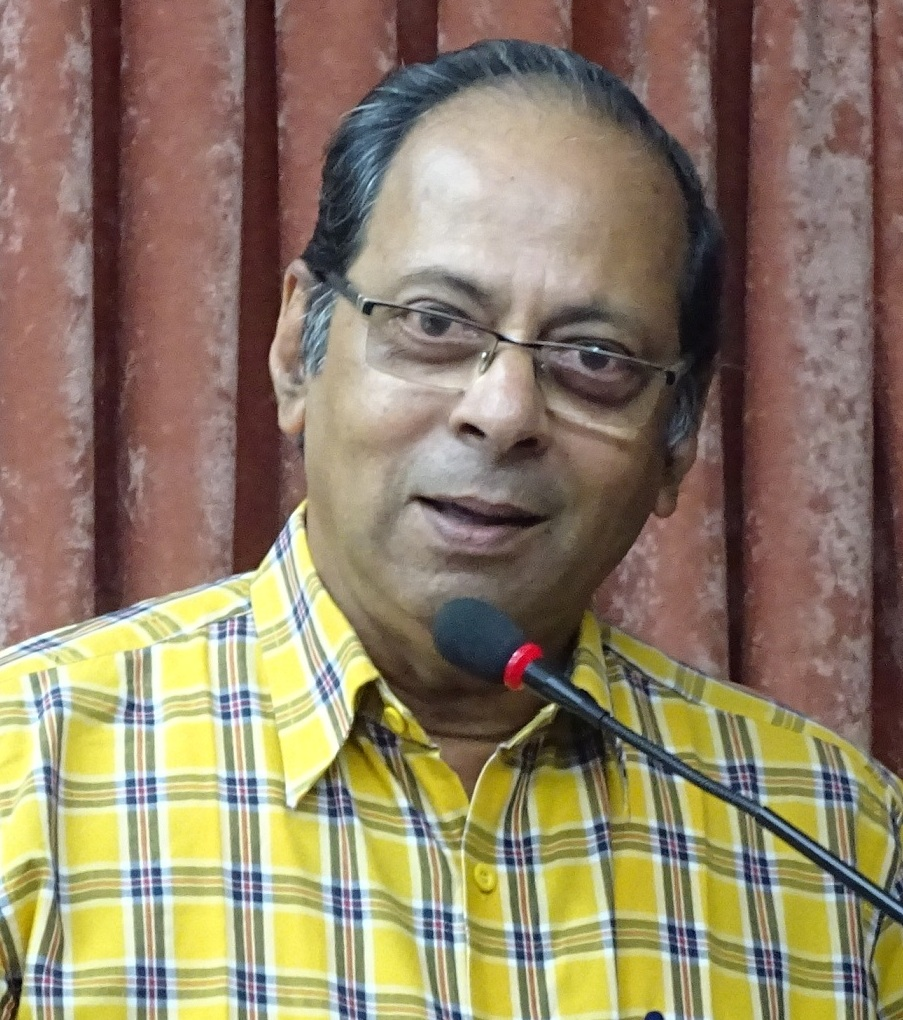
- D'Souza at TAG Conference hall, Panaji in 2015
- Born: Jose Maria Mathias Thomas Ignatius D'Souza; 31 July 1946 (age 80); Bombay, Bombay Presidency, British India
- Other name: Master Joe
- Occupations: Actor; singer; composer; playwright; theatre director
- Years active: 1953–present
- Spouse: Margaret D'Souza
- Children: 3
- Relatives: Carmen Rose (sister)

2nd Vice President of Tiatr Academy of Goa
- In office 27 August 2012 – 3 September 2015
- Preceded by: Roseferns
- Succeeded by: William Fernandes

Jose Maria Mathias Thomas Ignatius D'Souza (born 31 July 1946), known professionally as Joe Rose, is an Indian actor, singer, composer, playwright, and theatre director known for his work in Konkani films and tiatr productions.

== Early life ==
Jose Maria Mathias Thomas Ignatius D'Souza was born on 31 July 1946 in Bombay, Bombay Presidency during the British colonial era in India. He was born to Jose Luis and Anna Rita D'Souza, and had a sister named Carmen. His father was a business owner in Bombay, where he managed a hotel named Tossa & Co. This hotel was a central meeting place for several tiatr artists, who became closely acquainted with the D'Souza family. From a young age, D'Souza was exposed to and developed a strong interest in tiatr through his father's involvement in the local theatre scene. D'Souza's connections within the tiatr community deepened over time. The popular Konkani tiatr actor C. Alvares was a frequent visitor to the D'Souza household, where he would compose new works, with D'Souza eagerly learning the songs.

Other popular tiatr artists, such as Ophelia Cabral and Mohana Cabral, were also regular guests in the D'Souza home. During his educational pursuits, D'Souza engaged in minor acting roles within school theatrical presentations. During the family's time in Goa, at the Olaulim, D'Souza organized his own concerts featuring himself and his sisters, which drew attendance from the local neighborhood. D'Souza also had close ties to fellow tiatr artist J. P. Souzalin, who lived near the D'Souza family in Bombay. D'Souza would frequently attend Souzalin's rehearsals and performances. At the age of 7, D'Souza graced the stage in a Konkani drama named Bernadette of Lourdes and later showcased his talent as a child performer in Simon C. Fernandes' tiatr adaptation of Shakespeare's The Taming of the Shrew, where he portrayed the role of a humorous violin tutor opposite Cecilia Machado.

In the Goan theater tradition of tiatr, D'Souza was given the opportunity to play the role of Jesus Christ in the production of Pontius Pilate by Fernandes, after the sudden death of the previous actor Anthony De Sa. While on stage, D'Souza made a request to perform a duet, to which Fernandes graciously consented, resulting in a collaborative musical performance. D'Souza was paired with fellow performer Jessie Dias for the duet. However, D'Souza initially struggled to properly position himself in front of the microphone, leading to the audience having difficulty hearing the first verse of the duet. Before the start of the second verse, Dias issued a warning to D'Souza, leading to adjustments in his stage positioning. This modification contributed to the favorable reception of the performance by the audience.

Despite this success, some other artists in the tiatr community discouraged D'Souza from singing again. Rather than be dissuaded, viewing it as a challenge, D'Souza responded by creating his own original tiatr named Guneanv Konnacho. The production was directed by his sister Carmen Rose, with D'Souza taking on the role of the writer. The solitary presentation of this particular work at St. Xavier's College in Bombay on Easter Sunday was met with success and positive reception from the audience. D'Souza received acclaim for his solo song "Francis Luis Gomes" and his comedic performances with Paul Romy which was a duo song "Modko". This experience bolstered D'Souza's confidence in his abilities as a performer. Before achieving this milestone, he used the stage moniker "Master Joe," but after "Guneanv Konnacho," he embraced the name Joe Rose for his performances.

== Career ==
D'Souza kickstarted his career in Konkani entertainment at a young age, captivating audiences as "Master Joe" in a theatrical performance known as a tiatr, crafted and overseen by Konkani Playwright Simon C. Fernandes. The tiatr was an interpretation of Shakespeare's play The Merchant of Venice, which was translated and presented in the Konkani language with the title Venice Xaracho Vepari. Despite his youth, D'Souza's performances in Fernandes' productions were well-received, leading him to become a regular cast member in the playwright's tiatrs. During that era, he gained experience by performing alongside seasoned and well-known tiatrists like Anthony De Sa, M. Boyer, and Jacinto Vaz, among other figures in the industry. This early experience allowed D'Souza to develop his skills as a versatile character actor, capable of portraying both heroic and villainous roles with equal facility. As D'Souza matured, he began to take on a wider range of roles, including comedic parts in addition to his dramatic work. His talent and adaptability enabled him to inhabit a diverse array of characters on the Konkani stage. In later stages of his career, D'Souza also emerged as a songwriter and performer, composing songs for tiatrs that were praised for their "thoughtful and meaningful lyrics". Among his most well-known compositions include "Kaxintio Paim" and "Pixem".

Over the course of his lengthy career, D'Souza has written and directed several acclaimed tiatrs. Some of his popular works include the tiatrs Ekuch Rogot (One Blood), Sukh ani Dukh (Happiness and Sadness), Arbi Des Ancho Bhes (Arab Country, Our Attire), and Sun nhuim Sunnem (Not Daughter-in-law but a Dog). In addition to his work as a playwright and director, D'Souza has also appeared as an actor, with roles in two Konkani films - Boglantt (1975) and Girestcai (1983) - as well as the Konkani video film Mogachi Faxi directed by C. Alvares. D'Souza's performing arts career began at the young age of 7 in the city of Bombay (now Mumbai). Over the years, he gained renown as a widely traveled tiatrist, having taken his productions to audiences in the Gulf countries and the United Kingdom.

In early 2020, just prior to the onset of the COVID-19 pandemic, D'Souza directed and staged a Lenten tiatr titled Saiba Bogos. This production, which was adapted from an English play, ran for 7 performances and was staged in support of Auxilium Convent School in Carona neighborhood at Aldona, Goa. However, the seventh and final show of Saiba Bogos coincided with the implementation of pandemic lockdown measures, marking the end of D'Souza's active involvement in the Konkani theatrical scene. As of late 2022, D'Souza has refrained from participating in any new tiatr productions. He has cited a variety of factors for his hiatus, including COVID-19 concerns, his advanced age, inconvenient scheduling, and the demands of extensive travel. Instead, D'Souza has focused his efforts on maintaining his personal health and fitness, though he has not indicated any plans for a return to the Konkani stage.

In the latter part of his career, D'Souza has been able to consistently land heroic roles in several tiatr plays, even as he reached his late 50s. He has often been cast opposite former Konkani actresses such as Antonette Mendes, Fatima D'Souza, Sharon Mazarello, and Rita Rose, collaborating with these performers in several productions. Some of the popular tiatrs, D'Souza has been involved in include Fr. Savio by F. Cardozo and Padre Juze Vaz, the latter of which was directed by Prince Jacob. D'Souza has expressed appreciation for the opportunity to be part of these tiatr productions. In addition to leading roles, D'Souza has also demonstrated his versatility as a character actor, being cast in a wide range of parts in tiatrs directed by popular Konkani figures like Prem Kumar, M. Boyer, C. Alvares, and Remmie Colaço. This has allowed him to showcase his acting talent in a variety of contexts.

While D'Souza has taken a break from the Konkani stage since 2020, he has maintained an active presence on the YouTube platform. This has included appearances in short Konkani films such as Azadi - Give Me Freedom (2019), directed by Cezar D'Mello. During an appearance on the Candid with Candida Show, D'Souza expressed his intention to share his Konkani songs on YouTube. He had already uploaded some of his songs on the platform and intended to upload a short play as well. D'Souza is described as a versatile performer on the Konkani stage, known for his acting abilities in both comedic and serious roles. In addition to his acting talents, he is also skilled in singing, capable of performing in duets, trios, quartets, and quintets. His versatility often led to him being selected by fellow Konkani directors for their productions. D'Souza showcased versatility in his performances by taking on diverse roles that went beyond acting. He occasionally portrayed older characters, like a father figure to more experienced actors. An instance of this was seen in a production where he portrayed the father of Prem Kumar, who played his son on stage, despite being older than him in real life. During his younger years, D'Souza also portrayed roles as a bhatkar (landlord) or an elderly person.

These roles were particularly well received by audiences, who continued to remember D'Souza's performances even years later. One of his memorable roles as a landlord was in Prem Kumar's tiatr, Ordhi Bhakri (Half Bhakri). D'Souza's versatility extended to his ability to take on dual roles within a single production. In one of Prince Jacob's tiatr productions, he played two different characters in two separate stories that were part of the overall theatrical performance. In one of these stories, he portrayed a father figure. The audience's appreciation for D'Souza's performances was evident when, during a show in Mapusa, an audience member offered him ₹500 (US$5.20) for his portrayal of the dual roles, which included wearing a wig to differentiate the characters.

== Personal life ==
Upon medical advice to refrain from excessive involvement on the Konkani stage due to disrupted sleep patterns caused by late show timings and subsequent late meals, D'Souza, was cautioned by his doctor. Cezar D'mello, a longtime colleague in the Konkani stage productions, shared the stage with D'Souza after they first met during D'Souza's participation in tiatr shows in Bombay. They initially crossed paths during a production of John Claro's tiatr Portuguez Kolvont in Bombay in the 1980s. When asked about D'Souza's ability to assume roles quickly, D'Souza mentioned that he was as swift as putting on a shirt. He revealed that the death of his parents, particularly his father while he was studying law at the Government Law College in Bombay, had a significant impact on him. This loss led him to discontinue his legal studies. Reflecting in a November 2022 interview, D'Souza expressed that had he not left his studies, he might have excelled as a lawyer rather than an actor.

When discussing his youthful appearance despite his advancing age, D'Souza emphasizes that he avoids acknowledging his age, believing that one's mindset plays a crucial role. According to D'Souza, once an individual perceives themselves as old, they have already surrendered. He asserts that he never used wigs while portraying lead roles as a hero, even when his hair turned grey. D'Souza points out that English actors with limited hair are still cast in heroic roles, supporting his choice. The only instances D'Souza wore wigs were when a character necessitated it, particularly in dual roles. Additionally, he expressed an interest in becoming a teacher if he had not achieved success as a tiatrist. D'Souza also finds joy in being classified as a senior citizen after turning 60, citing government benefits and programs as contributing factors.

D'Souza obtained a Bachelor of Arts and a Bachelor of Education degrees after completing his studies primarily in Bombay during his early years. He attended St. Xavier's School in Bombay where he had classmates such as Jalal Agha, Arup Ganguly (son of Ashok Kumar), and Vijay Sippy, brother of Ramesh Sippy (known for Sholay), who recognized his talents in dramatics, elocution, and debates. His sister Carmen is a former Konkani singer and actress. D'Souza is married to Margaret, a homemaker, and they have three children together: two sons named Luis and Clint, and a daughter named Jennifer. As of 2018, he resides in Olaulim village, his ancestral home. D'Souza also served as the godfather to Clarence, son of Konkani actor C. Alvares.
