= Vincent de Saligão =

Indian actor (1924–1997)

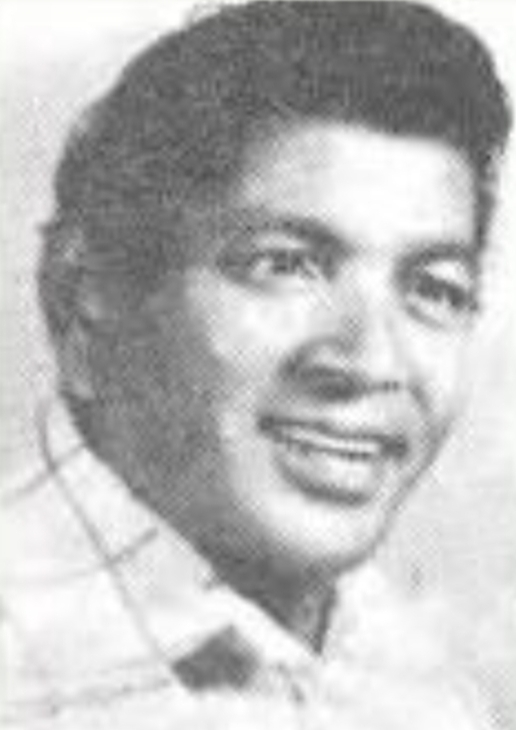
- Portrait of Vaz during his youth
- Born: Vicente Conceição Vás; 15 December 1924; Saligão, Goa, Portuguese India, Portuguese Empire
- Died: 27 April 1997 (aged 72); Saligao, Goa, India
- Other names: Vincy Vaz; Vincent Conception Vas
- Occupations: Female impersonator; actor; playwright; composer; singer
- Years active: 1942–1980s
- Spouse: Marelia Alvares (m. 1948)

Vincent Conceição Vaz (born Vicente Conceição Vás; 15 December 1924 – 27 April 1997), known professionally as Vincent de Saligão, was an Indian female impersonator, actor, playwright, composer, singer, and journalist who worked in Tiatr.

== Early life ==
Vaz was born as Vicente Conceição Vás on 15 December 1924 in Saligão, Goa, which was part of Portuguese India during the Portuguese Empire. Vaz was raised in a Goan Catholic family, the son of Julio Sebastião Vás, an employee, and Luizinha de Souza, a homemaker from Anjuna, Goa. He had one younger brother, José, (born 1930). While studying at Mater Dei School in Saligão, Vaz engaged in a range of performances, including concerts and theatrical productions, that were organized by the village boys in Saligão. This involvement was a common experience for those with aspirations to become tiatrists in Goa.

After attending a performance by an established tiatrist, Vaz was inspired to pursue a career in tiatr, the traditional Konkani theater form. At a young age, he wrote and staged his first original tiatr, titled Kustorba, in his hometown, which was well received by local audiences. Vaz's stage productions in Parra, Goa drew the interest of Anton Francis Rod, a well-known tiatr performer of that era. Impressed by Vaz's talent, Rod extended an offer for Vaz to participate in one of his shows, noting the young Vaz's presence and skills. This production also featured the dramatic troupe of Aleixinho de Candolim, providing Vaz with his first major opportunity to showcase his talents as both a singer and actor on the Konkani stage, marking a significant milestone in his career.

== Career ==
Vaz was known for his versatility as an actor, particularly in portraying female roles. During the early years of his career, he affiliated with Aleixinho de Candolim's dramatic troupe. This association granted him the chance to participate in tiatrs, a style of Goan theater, at multiple venues throughout the Goa region. This exposure helped Vaz gain recognition and acclaim for his acting abilities. He took on roles in a variety of tiatrs staged by Aleixinho, showcasing his acting talent and contributing to the cultural landscape of Goan theater. He garnered acclaim for his performances wherever he appeared, gradually gaining popularity among audiences. In 1942, a theatrical group from Bombay, known as tiatrists, embarked on a tour of Goa where they were showcasing a play called Ducoulelem Calliz by Anthony Vaz. One of the actors, Vincent Rod, playing the role of an ayah, suddenly fell ill after a performance. This led to a requirement for a replacement actor, especially for a female character. The Bombay troupes, known for their high standards, struggled to find a suitable replacement who could meet their expectations, particularly for a female role.

After carrying out auditions for multiple artists, the lead actor of the play Miss Julie, who was a female impersonator and held considerable authority in casting decisions, did not find any suitable candidates initially. However, he eventually relented and allowed Vaz to take on the role. Before this particular chance, Vaz had never played a female role. However, his physical appearance and skill in portraying a woman convincingly through attire and mannerisms impressed the Bombay troupes, ultimately resulting in his selection for the role. Vaz's performance in the Bombay tiatr production further solidified his reputation as a versatile actor, particularly in the realm of female roles. His association with Aleixinho de Candolim's troupe and the success of the Bombay tour cemented his standing in the Goan theater scene.

Initially hesitant about his ability to effectively portray female roles, Vaz, a newcomer to the world of female impersonation in Bombay, eventually showcased his talents and met the high standards of performance established by other tiatr artists in the region during that period. His performance as the character of an "ayah" (also known as a female attendant or nurse) was praised and appreciated by audiences. The contractor tasked with managing the printing and promotion of Vaz's inaugural performance inadvertently substituted the name "Vincent de Saligão" on the show's handbills after failing to recollect Vaz's surname. This stage name then became associated with Vaz going forward. After this initial success, the Konkani playwright J. P. Souzalin began regularly incorporating Vaz into the lead roles of his tiatr productions. Vaz became a specially featured artist in Souzalin's work, with the playwright leveraging Vaz's talents to help elevate the tiatr tradition as a whole.

In a similar manner, Souzalin ensured that Vaz had a dedicated space to pursue his Konkani tiatr stage career. Some of the popular tiatrs that featured Vaz in leading roles under Souzalin's direction included Osnoddcho Kistulo, Poilea Cheddeacho Baltim (First Son's Baptism), Tiklem Cheddum, Dadlo Vhodd vo Ostori (Is Man Great or Woman?), etc. In addition to his collaborations with Souzalin, Vaz also performed in productions directed by other leading Konkani theatre figures of the era, such as Saib Rocha, C. Alvares, A. M. B. Rose, Ernest Rebello, Jacinto Vaz, Minguel Rod, and Anthony De Sa. Across these varied associations, Vaz continued to be cast primarily in female character roles.

Vaz earned the reputation as the "Prince of Female Roles", which many directors bestowed the title upon him, due to his ability to convincingly embody and depict women on stage. He achieved renown for his contributions to tiatrs, excelling in the portrayal of female roles and became a known figure among tiatr enthusiasts for his performances in female roles across several productions. Playwrights J. P. Souzalin and A. M. B. Rose tailored specific roles for Vaz that highlighted his talent for portraying feminine characters, which enhanced the entertainment value of the tiatrs. Vaz's transformations into women were so complete and authentic that it was challenging for audiences to discern that he was a male actor, as his movements, voice, and overall presentation all exuded a convincingly feminine quality. Vaz's most acclaimed performances were in the tiatrs Atancheo Sunon (The Present Daughter-in-laws) by C. Alvares and Paichi Chuk vo Mainchi? (Father's mistake or Mother's?) by J. P. Souzalin.

In addition to his acting endeavors, Vaz was involved in the creation and production of several tiatr performances that he wrote and staged himself, including Visvaxi Ghorcarn (Trustful Housewife), Anv Matari (Me, the Old lady), Devak Dennem (God's Gift), Mhaka Dhor (Catch Me), Khoxe Bhair Kazar (Marriage out of Happiness), Hoklechi Khoxi (Bride's Wish), Atam Konn Kazar Zait? (Now, who might Marry?), and Boyfriend. Vaz also acted in the tiatr Don Ghoranchi Dusmankai (The Adversary of Two Houses), written by Dioguinho D'Mello and directed by Antonio Francisco Rod, with Dioguinho expressing admiration for Vaz's thespian skills. During this period, Vaz performed under the stage name of Vincy Vaz. Vaz demonstrated his multifaceted talents through directing the tiatr production Auntychea Roomant (In Aunty's Room), in addition to this, he was known for composing various songs, and showcasing his singing abilities. His musical compositions were recorded by Gramophone Company India, featuring well-known tracks like "Cheddvank Ollkonk" and "Kazar Zain Dista". Furthermore, he played a role as a journalist for Konkani magazines, including the weekly publications The Goa Times and The Goa Mail, both based in Bombay.

== Personal life ==
Vaz was a resident of the census town of Saligao in Goa as of 1995, wherein he lived with his family. On 14 November 1948, at the age of 23, he married Marelia Alvares, who was 21 years old and also based in Saligao. The marriage ceremony took place at the Church of Our Lady of Dolours in Sonapur, Bhandup, in Bombay. At the time of his marriage, Vaz was living in Sonapur and employed as a fitter. His marriage certificate was later transcribed on 30 April 1987, by civil registrar officials in the Bardez taluka of Goa. During his childhood, Vaz developed an interest in the work of Konkani playwright Aleixinho de Candolim and Konkani singer Dioguinho D'Mello. Though passionate about Konkani theater, he was not a full-time performer on the Konkani stage.

As noted by Konkani writer Tomazinho Cardozo, he highlighted the difficulty artists faced in supporting their families solely through performances in tiatr during that era. As a result, Vaz sought employment in the Gulf countries for an extended period, working abroad to support his family. Vaz's health eventually declined, necessitating his return to Goa. He was subsequently diagnosed with paralysis. During this period, Cardozo frequently visited Vaz at his home to show his respect, but was struck by Vaz's continued devotion to the Konkani tiatr stage, despite his debilitating condition. Even though Vaz could no longer actively participate in productions, he remained engaged with the art form, discussing tiatrs through his thoughts and insights until his death. On 27 April 1997, Vaz, aged 71, died in Saligao, Goa.
