= Valente Mascarenhas =

Indian actor and singer (1925–1999)

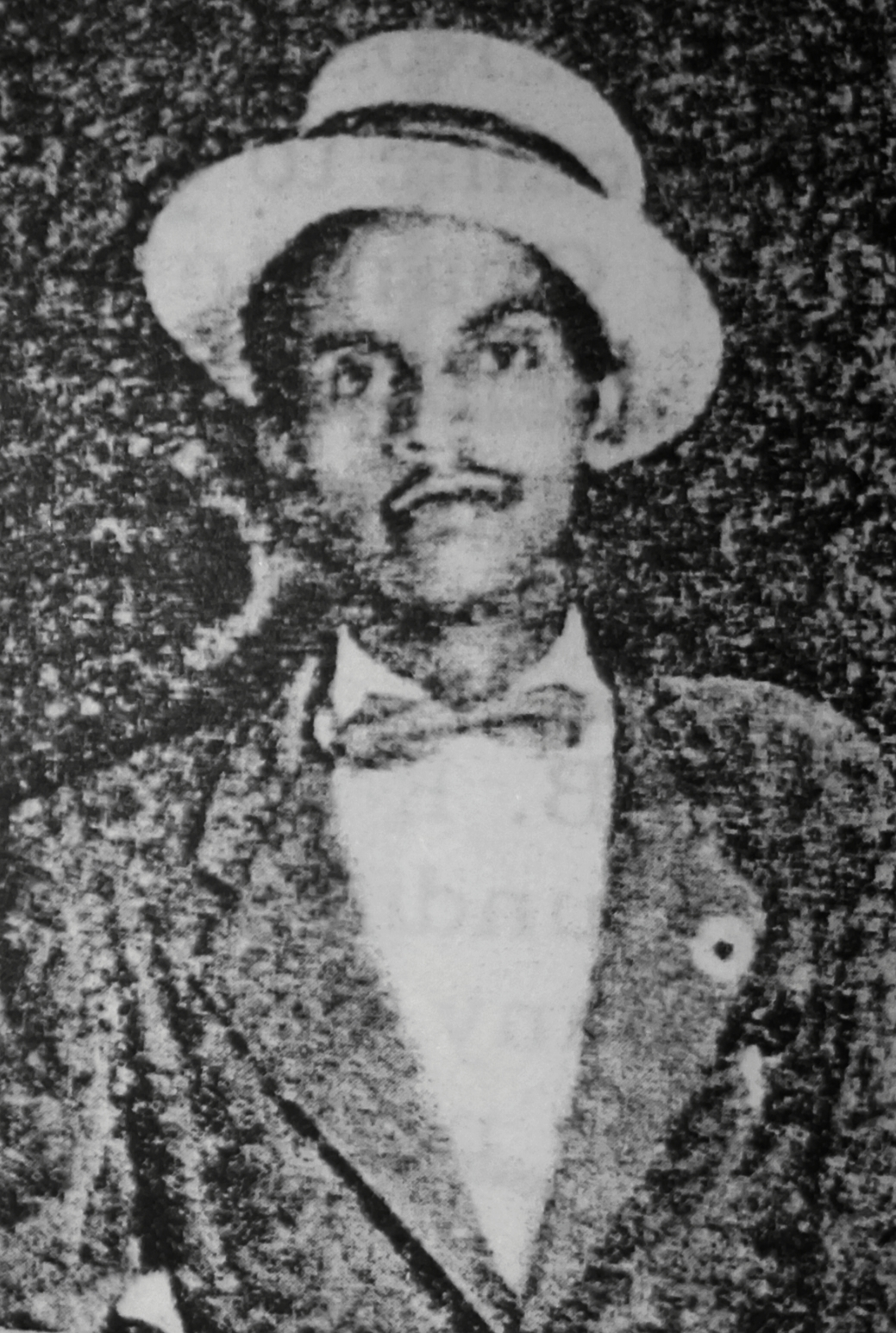
- Mascarenhas featured in a promotional image for his tiatr Guneaukari (Culpable).
- Born: Carmo Valeriano Mascarenhas; 16 November 1925; Guirim, Goa, Portuguese India, Portuguese Empire
- Died: 23 August 1999 (aged 73); Goa Medical College, Bambolim, Goa, India
- Occupations: Actor; singer; composer; playwright; theatre director
- Years active: 1938–1998
- Notable work: Amchem Noxib (1963); Nirmon (1966); Muqabla (1979)
- Spouse: Rita de Souza (m. 1950)
- Children: 5

Carmo Valeriano "Valente" Mascarenhas (16 November 1925 – 23 August 1999) was an Indian actor, singer, composer, playwright, theatre director, and former make-up artist known for his work in Hindi, Konkani films, television, tiatr productions, and folk plays.

== Early life ==
Carmo Valeriano Mascarenhas was born on 16 November 1925 in Guirim, Goa, which was part of Portuguese India during the Portuguese Empire, into a Goan Catholic family. He was the youngest of four children. He had three brothers: Rofino (born 1921), Leonardo (born 1917), and Jermeno (born 1915). They were born to Lourenco Caetano Mascarenhas, a landlord from Sangolda, Goa, and Maria Aninha Pascoala Mascarenhas, a homemaker.

During his childhood, Mascarenhas made the transition to Bombay (present-day Mumbai) at the age of 12. His educational journey led him to Barretto High School in Cavel, followed by enrollment at Propriety High School. Throughout his time in school, Mascarenhas exhibited a flair for painting, producing several portraits. However, his predominant interest laid in the realm of the Konkani stage. Based on insights from ex-politician and Konkani playwright Tomazinho Cardozo, Mascarenhas displayed early indications of his future success in the Konkani tiatr (theater) domain during his youth.

== Career ==
Mascarenhas was a performer known for his involvement in the Konkani theatrical tradition of tiatr. Though he possessed a talent for singing, he initially faced challenges in securing prominent opportunities to showcase this ability. During this time, Mascarenhas regularly sang in the choir at St. Francis Xavier Church in Dabul, Bombay. In addition to his vocal skills, Mascarenhas also demonstrated aptitude as a painter, particularly in portraiture, as a school student. He leveraged this artistic talent to gain proximity to the tiatrists - the practitioners of the tiatr form. Mascarenhas undertook portrait painting commissions for tiatrists, which then led to opportunities for him to work as a makeup artist for these performers. This insider access allowed Mascarenhas to immerse himself in the Konkani theatrical milieu.

Mascarenhas proved to be a versatile actor on the tiatr stage, capable of delivering portrayals across a range of roles. In 1938, he was granted the chance to sing five songs in a tiatr production of Kombekar, staged by Miss Ida at the Indra Bhavan in Dhobitalao. A. M. B. Rose and Alfred Rose also contributed their vocal talents to the cast of the same tiatr performance. However, although possessing strong vocal skills, Mascarenhas failed to leave a significant impact on the audience during his debut performance. He then subsequently joined the tiatr troupe of Simon C. Fernandes, appearing in one of the group's productions titled Kunvori Hermegildachi. This marked a turning point in Mascarenhas' career, as he went on to establish himself as an actor within the Konkani theatrical tradition.

Mascarenhas's early career also included a singing role in the 1942 Goan tiatr (theatrical production) Amel Ponjecarn by C. Brazil. During this tiatr performance, Mascarenhas made his debut as a singer at the P. T. Bhangwadi stage in Bombay. In this same production, Mascarenhas had the opportunity to perform two songs, one solo and one duet with Rosario de Aldona. However, his singing during this performance did not impress the audience. After this initial foray into singing, Mascarenhas appeared to have recognized that his true talents laid more in the realm of acting rather than music. He was subsequently given the chance to play the role of the Pope in Simon C. Fernandes's tiatr Santa Philomena, substituting for another actor who was absent. Mascarenhas took advantage of this opportunity and delivered a well-received performance as the Pope, which led to further acting roles being offered to him. He then went on to portray the character of Friar Lawrence in a production of Shakespeare's Romeo and Juliet. However, it was his lead role in the play Judas Iscariot that is said to have firmly established him as a versatile actor capable of inhabiting a wide range of characters. While Mascarenhas's initial efforts at singing did not meet with success, he was able to transition his talents towards acting, where he found acclaim and success in his career.

Mascarenhas found success in the tiatr theater genre during the mid-20th century. He received acclaim from personalities like Saib Rocha, leading to an invitation to take part in Rocha's theatrical performance titled Mog Ani Krim (Love and Crime). At first, Mascarenhas encountered enthusiasm but also encountered opposition from his elder brother, who mandated that he exclusively take part in productions under the direction of Simon C. Fernandes. Anthony De Sa was able to intervene and convince the brother to allow Mascarenhas to accept Rocha's offer. Mascarenhas went on to appear in Rocha's 1948 tiatr Son of Jerusalem, where he portrayed the character of Julius. This theatrical production took place at P. T. Bhangwadi on 11 January 1948.

Mascarenhas had previously performed in Rocha's production Mog Ani Krim (Love and Crime) earlier. Mascarenhas also acted in the tiatr Dubavi Ghorkarn (Doubtful Housewife). His versatility and talent led to him being sought after by several tiatr directors. He demonstrated an ability to portray a wide range of characters, including elderly roles, despite his own youth. Konkani director and singer Kid Boxer wrote specific parts for Mascarenhas in many of his productions. Mascarenhas also acted in tiatrs directed by German Pinto, Minguel Rod, Pai Tiatrist, Young Menezes, M. Boyer, Jacinto Vaz, and J. P. Souzalin. His performance in Pinto's Lojechem Boglantt was particularly acclaimed by the audience. Through his acclaimed work in these various tiatr productions, Mascarenhas gained acclaim within the Goan theater scene of the era.

Following his stint in tiatrs in Bombay (now Mumbai), Mascarenhas returned to Goa and immersed himself in acting roles within the realm of khell productions. These performances were crafted and overseen by playwrights including Ligorio Fernandes, Pascoal Rodrigues, and Lino Fernandes, among others. Mascarenhas's performances on the tiatr stage earned him acclaim and recognition. In addition to his acting work, he made contributions as a playwright. Over the span of his six-decade career, he was involved in the creation, direction, and production of approximately 25 tiatrs, showcasing his talents in the theatrical realm across both Goa and Bombay. Some of his popular plays included Guneaukari (Culpable), Vhoddponn (Proudness), Tarvotteacho Put (Seaman's Son), Bim Toxem Bhat (As the Seed, so the Land), Kirmidoracho Xevott (Fate of a Criminal), Kednaim Punn Etolo (Someday he'll come), Toch Amkam Zai (He is what we need), Asli vo Nakli (Real or Fake), Khunni Sampoddio, Inam Rogtacho (Reward of Blood), Kudd'ddo Bhikari (Blind Beggar), Niropradeak Bondkonn, and Sonxit to Bhagivont, etc.

Mascarenhas was also known for his skills as a singer and would often perform songs as part of his tiatr productions. In his vocal repertoire, he participated in a duet titled "Parmila" alongside Cecilia Machado, as well as a solo rendition of "I have 100 Acers in the valley," which gained popularity during his era. In addition to his work in tiatr, Mascarenhas composed several gospel songs. Beyond his achievements in tiatr, Mascarenhas also had a presence in the film industry. He acted in the Konkani films Amchem Noxib and Nirmon, as well as the Hindi film Muqabla, where he played a significant role. Mascarenhas also took on minor roles in other Hindi cinema productions. Moreover, he was involved in the production of traditional folk plays for All India Radio, Goa, and curated programs for Goa Doordarshan. Over the course of his career, Mascarenhas is estimated to have acted in approximately 3,500 tiatr productions, cementing his status as an influential figure within the Goan tiatr tradition. While his acting prowess was celebrated, his contributions as a playwright and composer also played a significant role in shaping the evolution of this form of Konkani theater.

== Personal life ==
Mascarenhas and his family lived in the Bela Vista neighborhood in Sangolda, Goa. As a youth, he relocated to the city of Bombay (now Mumbai), where he settled in the Sonapur area of the Bhandup suburb. On 15 April 1950, at the age of 24, Mascarenhas married Rita de Souza, a 20-year-old woman from the Dhobitalao neighborhood of Bombay. The couple wed at the Church of Our Lady of Dolours in Sonapur and went on to have five children together-three sons Loandro (born 1956), Xavier, and Micky, and two daughters Maria and Dorothy "Dolla" (born 1971) . At the time of his marriage, Mascarenhas was employed as a clerk in Bombay. After returning to Goa, he took a position at the Mormugao Port Trust (MPT) in Vasco da Gama, Goa. Mascarenhas's wife Rita also had a role in the 1963 Konkani film Amchem Noxib, in which she appeared alongside her husband.

Mascarenhas's three children Dola, Xavier, and Micky are involved on the Konkani stage as theatre actors. Mascarenhas not only engaged in performing but also made contributions to the tiatr tradition through his artistry by designing stage panels for directors in the genre. In the early 1990s, Mascarenhas was reported to be in good health, but his condition later deteriorated, leading him to cease his Konkani stage appearances around 1998. Even as his health declined and he entered retirement, Mascarenhas remained knowledgeable about tiatr songs and music, as noted by Konkani playwright Tomazinho Cardozo. Mascarenhas died on 23 August 1999, at the age of 73, at the Goa Medical College in Bambolim, Goa.
