= Multilingual writing =

Multilingual writing is a concept derived from multilingualism used to describe a person's ability to be able to write in more than one language. Multilingual writing allows for the development of rhetorical awareness and attunement through multilingual writers' experiences across languages and cultures that have helped in shaping how they communicate in academic and social contexts. Multilingual writing researchers have begun associating the concept as the translingual approach in which it sees difference within language not as a barrier to overcome, but as production of meaning within writing, speaking, reading, and listening. Multilingual writing uses approaches such as translingualism to allow for full usage of the writer's linguistics.

== History ==
Multilingual writing, being a concept traced from multilingualism, is said to have originated earliest during the Sumerian and Ancient Egypt period when multilingual written clay tablets were discovered showcasing the skills of people who were taught to speak and write in Sumerian and Akkadian during this period. Similarly, there were findings during The Roman Empire, The Middle Ages, Renaissance, and Enlightenment periods. Multilingualism was found in forms of literary texts, letters, and a means of communication amongst people, slaves, and trade.

== Benefits ==
Multilingual writing helps writers become linguistically flexible, developing rhetorical attunement, and building a better cultural understanding. Being a multilingual writer comes in handy when you are determined to learn all these different languages. It has been shown that knowing more than one language changes how you use and understand each language, making a bilingual or multilingual brain and vocabulary inherently different from a monolingual brain. This is a benefit because it creates more opportunities, for example, some college campuses have established multilingual centers that hire multilingual people to tutor other students who want to learn about the multilingual culture and want to have an open mindset in foreign places, and this only benefits these students when doing things like studying abroad.

=== Linguistic flexibility ===
Multilingual writing contributes to writers becoming more linguistically flexible, which is when they're able to adapt, switch, and modify language based on the context or audience. Multilingual writers combine different languages dynamically to use them effectively. Different written languages have many similarities, in grammar, rhetoric, and features. These similarities help form a more integrated system in developing multilingual writing skills. The translingual approach to become linguically flexible, it helps build recognition towards differences in language as the resource for producing writing, speaking, reading, and listening. Using this approach, writers are able to expand their abilities with how they decide to choose words, expressions, structures, and communication within their writing, allowing them to become linguistically flexible with their work.

Additionally, there has been ongoing research into how multilingual writers manage the burden of carrying multiple languages with them. There was a case study done on a multilingual exchange student who writes in three languages. Multilingualism didn't come easily to the student who struggled for about 8 months to develop the writing and maintain all three languages. The study overall showed that the student and others used the same writing strategies when writing in English and their other languages.

=== Rhetorical attunement ===
Multilingual writing has also helped writers develop a rhetorical attunement, the ability to notice differences in audience, culture, power, and context in order to adjust language accordingly. Through their experiences as multilingual writers, the development of rhetorical attunement allows them to notice the distinction within languages and see its differences, history, and complications.

=== Cultural understanding ===
Building of linguistic flexibility and rhetorical attunement helps multilingual writers acquire better cultural understanding. Writers actively engaging with the translingual approach are developing transcultural dispositions, which helps them see how culture influences writing. This shapes their cultural understanding of different perspectives, audience, and writing styles. Similarly, rhetorical attunement shapes their cultural understanding by helping the writers understand and notice the differences within languages, cultural perspectives and communications. Through developing cultural understanding, writers are able to build a sense of comfort using and sharing languages as they've come to familiarize themselves with the cultural differences lying underneath languages.

It is also important to expand this cultural understanding to college campuses. The multilingual writers research project includes an immense amount of research projects in several research programs. The purpose of this project was to better understand multilingual students. This research project used interviews as their final method, and this ultimately reminded the school that no student already enters college with a linguistic context. At the end of the MLWRP, people at Northeastern were reminded that they need to avoid being broad towards multilingual student writers and instead be more tentative and aware of languages, diversity, cultures, etc. Overall, this project made a change on the Northeastern campus, so now they are more tentative and aware of what multilingualism is.

Multiple colleges like the University of San Francisco have implied having multilingual writing centers on campus. They conduct tutoring in English, French, Japanese, and Spanish. USF and the University of Chicago have collaborative multilingual writing and research centers that employs a variety of foreign language writing tutors. These multilingual writing centers exposes students to multiple languages and adds them to their skillset Multilingual students experience less culture shock and assimilate better in comparison their monolingual peers in foreign environments. Overall, it is to be said that many more colleges should begin to expand and create these multilingual cultural centers due to its benefits on making students aware of the multilingualism culture.

== Writing studies perspectives ==
=== Translingual approaches ===
Standard language ideology indicates that there's only one correct form of a language that should be used in academic writing. However, this view of language can disadvantage multilingual writers because the language differences are often positioned as errors. A translingual view of writing presents language differences as a resource for producing meaning. According to this view, language practices are "heterogeneous, fluid, and negotiable," which emphasizes a dynamic interaction of language differences.

=== Biliteracy ===
Biliteracy stands for the ability to read and write in more than one language (generally in two languages) Multilingual writers develop language proficiency across multiple languages rather than a single language system. In this biliteracy perspective, it shows that the languages are interconnected closely. The awareness of knowledge and genre acquired in one language could also apply and support other languages in multilingual literacy practices.

== Multilingual writing in education ==
Educational institutions have developed programs for assisting multilingual students with writing in academic settings. Multilingual students usually face more challenges beyond grammar and vocabulary, specifically academic conventions, assignment expectations and also classwork and practices.

The effective support for multilingual writers should focus on three areas: knowledge, attitude, and practice. Knowledge works with understanding students' linguistic experiences. Attitude emphasizes openness to the language differences. Practice refers to applying inclusive tutoring strategies in general writing centers. Multilingual students also benefit from writing instruction that emphasizes meaning-making rather than simple language corrections. Students develop writing abilities by engaging with academic tasks that encourage them to understand and negotiate meaning across texts.

== Challenges ==
Although multilingual writing contains some benefits like the ability to be flexible and having an ability to have an enhanced brain, there are a lot of struggles that multilingual writers face, especially those who are mandated to know multiple languages. The No Child Left Behind Act, passed in 2002, was meant to create a standard that all students should be taught the same. Not only that, but this is then reflected in the annual testing that K-12 schools do. Although the concept of this act that was passed has good intentions, it didn't exactly do that. Many of the students needed help understanding the prompt, structure, etc. One was a beginner at the ESL level. She approached her teacher for help, and he gave her feedback, but when helping, he struggled and ultimately just gave up on trying to help the student understand and just broke down the prompt for her. While the NCLB was created for equity in the educational system, its implementation at district and school site levels generally focuses on the standardized outcome of having good test scores, so that schools have a good reputation instead of the students 'needs, which ultimately causes a gap in learning between these students.

It doesn't end here. Upon entering college, a lot of multilingual students are mandated to take a placement writing exam to see what level of writing they are placed in. There was a study done on a specific subgroup of students who were multilingual and had to take the placement test; half were given the chance to choose whether or not they stayed in the placement class they were assigned, and the other half wasn't given the option. The study overall showed that those who had a say in their placement stated that their course level was just right compared to those who didn't have a choice. One of the survey questions asked who should be in control of the placement process, and those who did have an option said that students should be able to determine their placement, while the comparison group stated that staff/teachers should decide. The study found that the students who did have a choice did not appear to abuse the chance to be able to self-place themselves, and they took choosing a course for themselves seriously, which also shows that students can be trusted with this decision. In addition, those who did have the option performed better due to them knowing that they were given a chance to self-place.

Furthermore, institutions may overlook the complexity of students' linguistic backgrounds by treating different languages and dialects as interchangeable, resulting in linguistic confusion. For example, a student who grew up speaking mainly English and Shanghainese was placed in a Mandarin-Language class, despite not speaking Mandarin daily.

Multilingual students may also experience difficulties in preserving meanings across languages. Specific idioms, rhetoric, or cultural expressions may lack a direct equivalent in other languages. As a result, intended tones and cultural connotations may be lost in translation. Direct translations may also sound unclear or unnatural, requiring students to revise and edit repeatedly to balance accuracy with fluidity.

While being able to switch writing style in their native language, multilingual students may experience struggles adapting to specific expectations in their non-native language, such as writing with conciseness or formality. In one study, writers showed more hesitations in an academic setting in comparison to a social setting, this is likely a result of rigid expectations and fear of negative evaluation.

These challenges are not limited to students. Studies on different groups of multilingual teachers observed that participants often expressed feelings of linguistic inadequacy. However, as these teachers continued to practice multilingual and reflective writing, they started viewing being multilingual as an asset, positively affecting their confidence as writers.

== Multilingual writing support ==
Multilingual writing has begun to see support from writing professionals and educators after studies have recommended encouraging them to recognize language differences instead of shutting them down and sticking to conventional English writing, monolingual writing.

== Multilingual writing in education ==
Multilingual Writing is an education literacy system that allows multilingual speakers to connect the different languages they speak.

=== Current teaching methods ===
Dynamic Written Corrective Feedback is an education method for English learners that uses multilingual writing as a medium to self-improve editing ability and grammatical accuracy. This has been shown to be more effective in improving students' performance in writing than traditional teaching methods.

=== Current assessment methods ===
In multilingual writing, writing skills consist of multiple dimensions, such as structure, vocabulary, and productivity. Researchers have proposed a longitudinal perspective of multilingual development, which examines how writing abilities develop over time across different languages. This allows educators to assess multilingual writers's growth more comprehensively.

=== Future development and improvement ===
Most theory, teaching methods, and assessments of multilingual writing provide a basic level analysis. Due to education system pressure, lack of data, minimal society attention, and less multilingual educators, multilingual writing education is facing some difficulty in teaching. In the multilingual writing community are advocating for the installation of multilingual writing institutions, whether it be creating writing centers or integrating support within schools. These institutions allow for a better support system for multilingual writers by enabling them to receive tutoring services, help in seeing the competence with using another language besides English, and the further development of their multilingualism skills.
