= Metro INOX Cinemas =

Cinema in Mumbai, India

Coordinates: 18°56′34.6″N 72°49′43.67″E

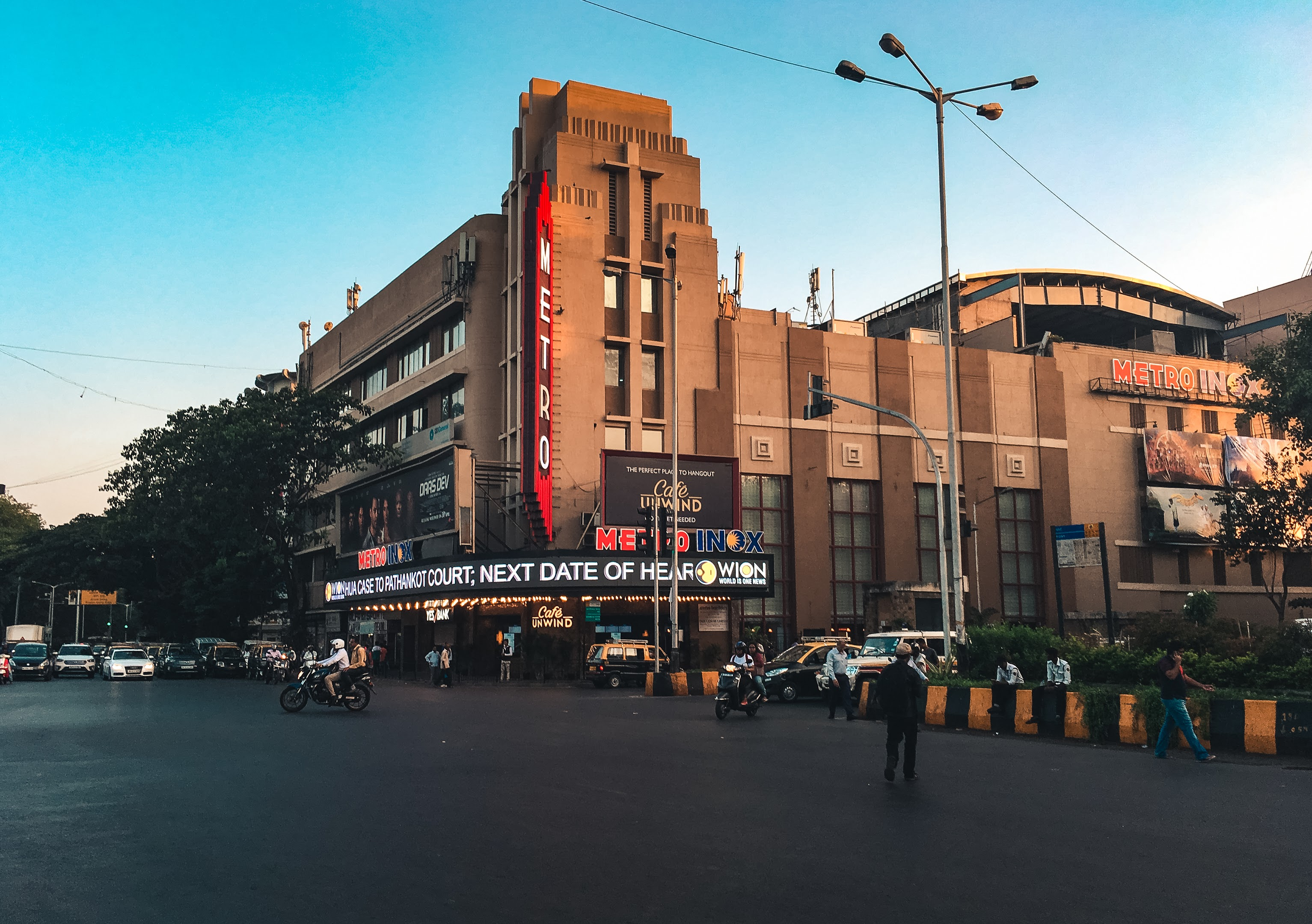
- North side of the main entrance of Metro INOX Cinemas in May 2018
- Interactive map of Metro INOX Cinemas
- Former names: • Metro Cinema (1938–2006) • Metro Adlabs (2006–2008) • Metro Big Cinemas (2008–2016)
- Location: Mahatma Gandhi Rd, Dhobitalao, Marine Lines, Mumbai, India
- Operator: INOX Leisure Limited
- Type: Cinema Hall
- Public transit: Marine Lines

Construction
- Opened: 5 June 1938; 88 years ago
- Renovated: 2006; 20 years ago
- Architect: Thomas W. Lamb

Metro INOX Cinemas (formerly Metro Big Cinema (2008–2016), Metro Adlabs (2006–2008) and Metro Cinema (1938–2006)) is an Art Deco Heritage grade IIA multiplex Movie theater in Mumbai, India built in 1938. It was built and originally run by Metro-Goldwyn-Mayer (MGM). The main architect of the cinema was Thomas W. Lamb of New York City, and D. W. Ditchburn (Senior partner of the architectural firm Ditchburn Mistry and Bhedwar) of Mumbai was the associate architect. It was one of the main sites targeted in the 2008 Mumbai attacks by Lashkar-e-Taiba.

== History ==
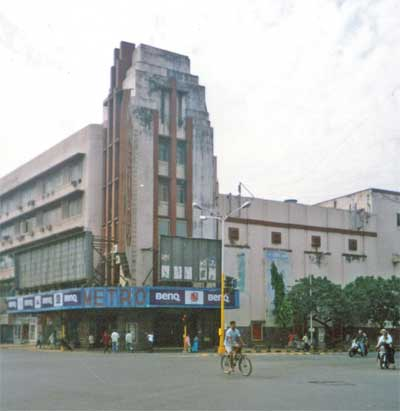
Metro Cinema c.2005

Metro is located in the Dhobitalao area of Mumbai. The Art Deco cinema opened on 5 June 1938, and initially exhibited movies made by MGM. The interior, floors, walls, ceilings as well as the furniture, was in shades of red and pink. Patrons were serviced by liveried ushers in the marble foyer and staircases, which led up to murals by students of the Sir J. J. School of Art, under Charles Gerard. In 1955 Metro was the venue for the first Filmfare Awards night.

== Transformation into multiplex ==
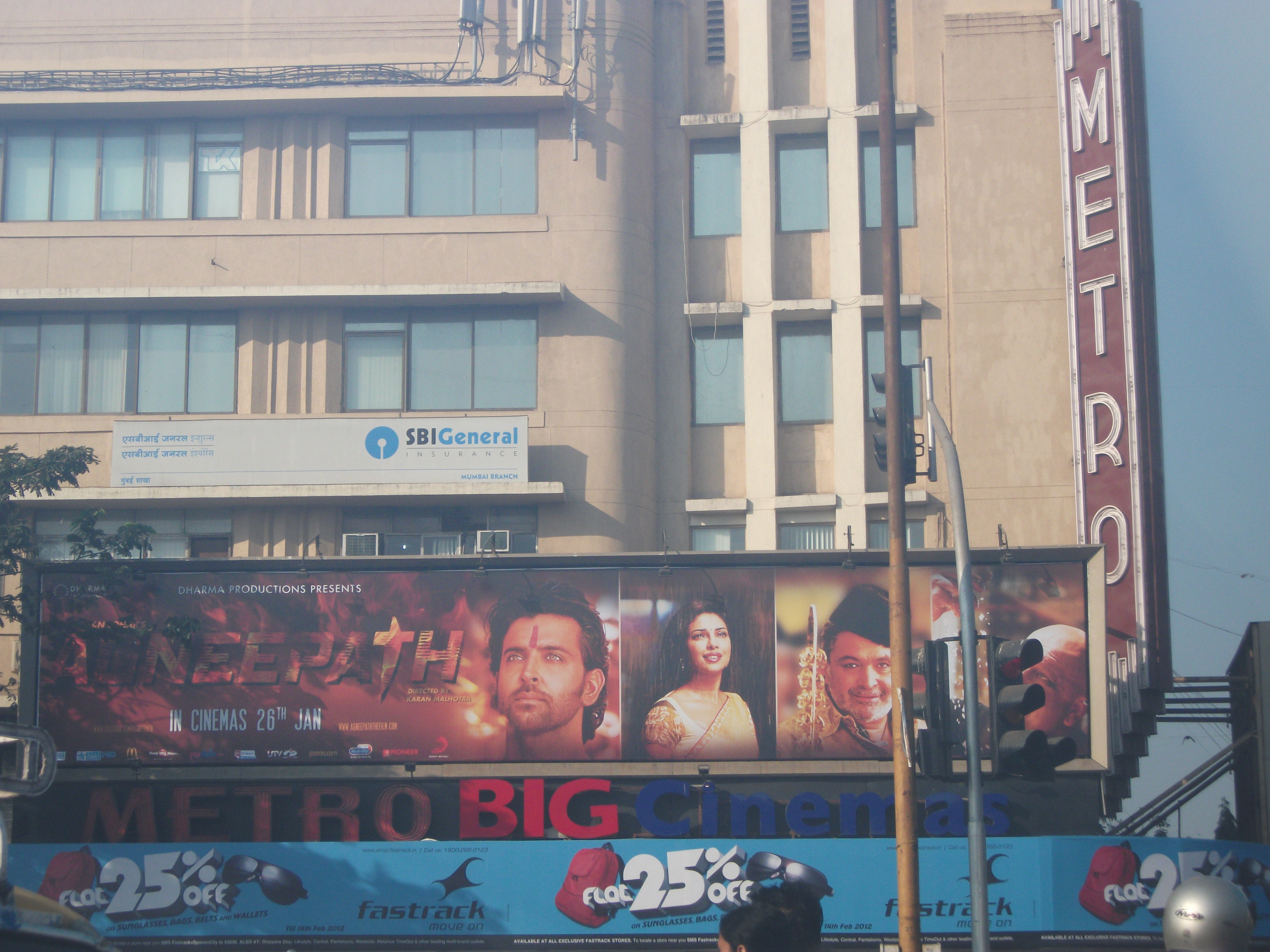
Metro, c. 2012

Despite such achievements, Metro could not stand up to the multiplex invasion, it was becoming difficult to fill up the 1,491 seats. The promoters decided to transform the old cinema into a multiplex, while also restoring its original art-deco interiors. The cinema was acquired by Big Cinemas and in the start of 2005, the cinema closed down.

The cinema re-opened after renovation in August 2006, screening the Karan Johar film “Kabhi Alvida Naa Kehna”. The cinema now has six screens, which are among the largest multiplex screens in Mumbai.

In 2016, INOX had purchased the building originally for Metro Big Cinemas, after that the building was covered in scaffolding nets for renovation into the multiplex. On November 29, 2017, Amitabh Bacchan, founder of Kaun Banega Crorepati, along with Devendra Fadnavis had inaugurated Metro INOX Cinemas, showing the transformation into a luxury multiplex from 1930s Single Screen. In 2021, Metro Inox got approval to build a 5th floor, and was still operational.
