= Guirim =

- Village
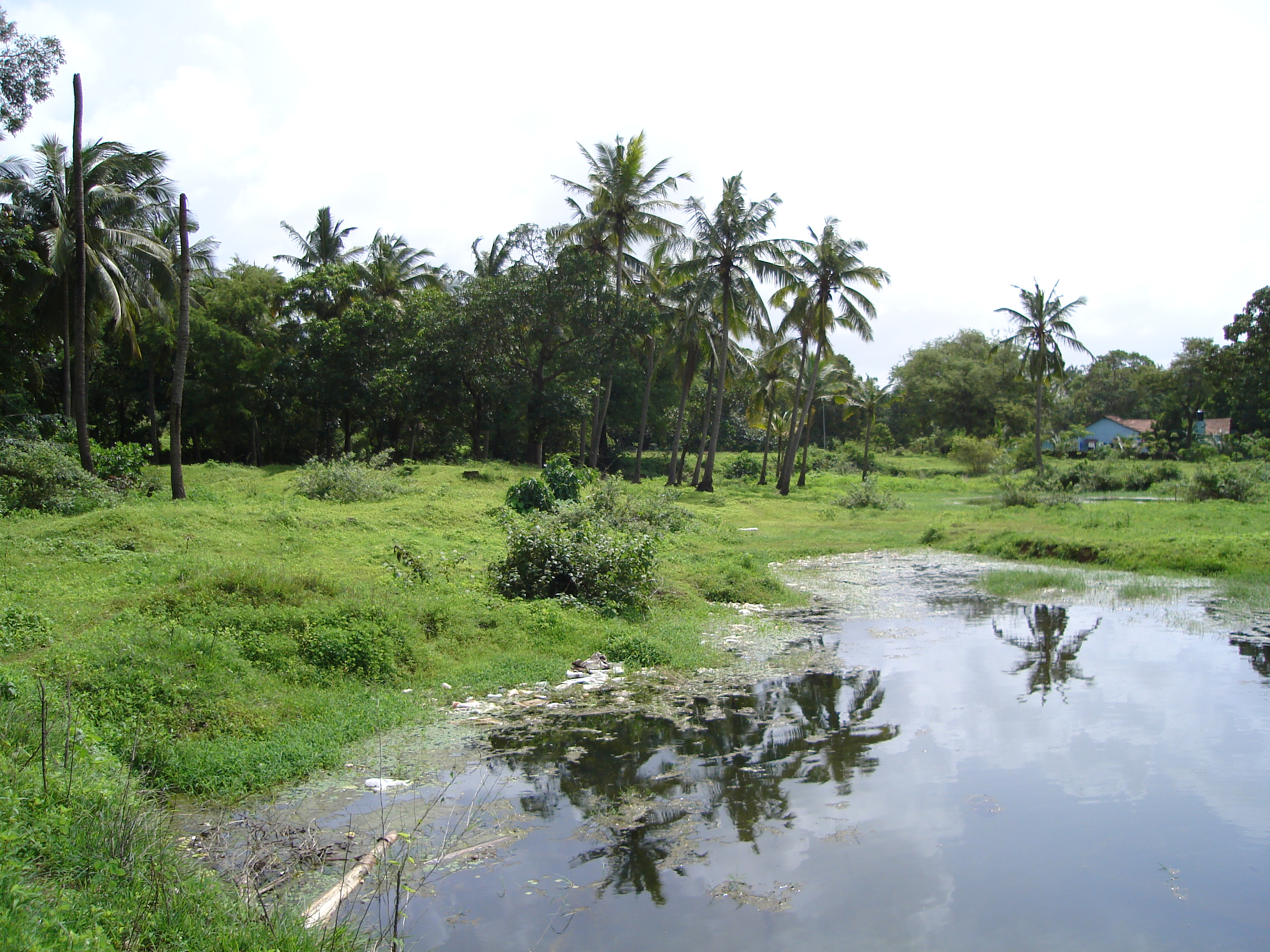
- Interactive map of Guirim
- Location in Goa, India Guirim (India)
- Coordinates: 15.58°N 73.80°E
- Country: India
- State: Goa
- District: North Goa
- Elevation: 7 m (23 ft)

Population (2001)
  - Total: 6,371

Languages
  - Official: Konkani
- Time zone: UTC+5:30 (IST)
- Vehicle registration: GA
- Website: villagepanchayatguirim.com

Guirim is a census town in North Goa in the Indian state of Goa. For administrative purposes, however, it is considered to be a village, and has a village panchayat, which is the local administration of a village in parts of India. Guirim is located on the outskirts of the North Goa main commercial city of Mapusa (also spelt as Mapsa or Mapuca). It is the last village along the Panjim-Mapusa highway that one encounters prior to reaching Mapusa.

== Area and population ==
Guirim has an area of 4.03 square kilometres, and a total of 1,178 households. Its population totals 5.036 (according to the 2011 official Census) which comprises 2,502 males and 2,534 females. Its under-six population in 2011 was a total of 493 children, comprising 258 boys and 235 girls.

== About the village ==
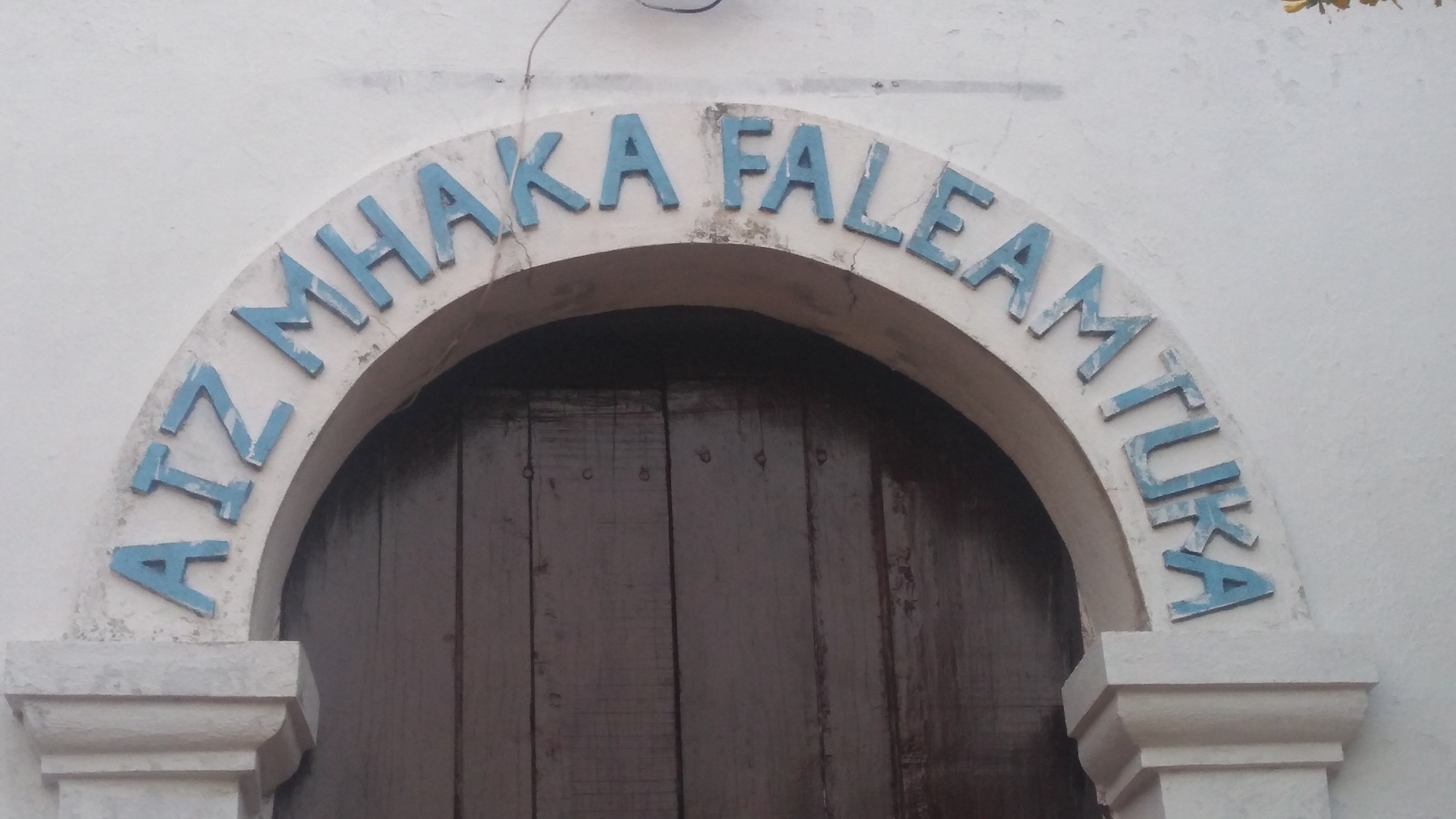
Guirim-Sangolda cemetery 2019.

The village is also known as Girvoddea in the local Konkani language. Gurim has been home to the prominent St. Anthony's High School, run by the Goa Capuchin Friars and is located on a hillock that overlooks the agrarian village whose geography is dominated by paddy fields.

The village cemetery has, prominently written on its entrance, the text in Konkani which is meant to be a reminder of our own limited nature, Aiz Mhaka, Falea Tuka, which means, "Today it's my turn. Tomorrow yours."

== School ==
St Anthony's at Guirum, the prominent local school, is run in the English-medium. It was earlier a boys-only school though now is a mixed school catering to both boys and girls.

The school was conceived by the Capuchins in 1936 and became a reality in 1941. This Catholic religious order was planning to build their residence at Peddem, on the other side of Mapusa, when Fr. Hippolito da Luna (1909-1942), director of the Collegio de Santo Antonio boarding school offered to hand over to them the school, boarding, Chapel and adjoining property on the hill to the Capuchins.

The Capuchins took over the school in May 1942. It was set up with the aim of offering the youth of Goa sound and quality and all-round education through literary, moral, religious, emotional and physical education. This school is open to all. Its motto in Latin is Ad Ardua (towards higher, greater achievements). Every year 45 students get scholarships and 90 freeships are given for hardworking students.

This has been one of the prominent schools in Bardez, with a particularly strong reputation for its prowess in sports, particularly football and hockey around the second half of the 20th century.

== Geography ==
Guirim is located at 15°33′48″N 73°48′55″E . It has an average elevation of 7 metres (23 feet).

== Demographics ==
As of 2001 India census, Guirim had a population of 6371. Males constitute 51% of the population and females 49%. Guirim has an average literacy rate of 70%, higher than the national average of 59.5%: male literacy is 75%, and female literacy is 65%. In Guirim, 12% of the population is under 6 years of age.

== Notable people ==
- Valente Mascarenhas (1925–1999), Goan actor, singer, composer, playwright and theatre director known for his contributions to Konkani theatre and Indian cinema. He was born in Guirim.
- Anil Chawan, Indian professional footballer who has played as a defender for clubs including ATK, East Bengal, Rajasthan United and Inter Kashi. He previously played for SESA Football Academy in Goa.
- Tanisha Pawar, Goan filmmaker, writer and researcher known for her documentary work on traditional Goan folk culture. She directed Hovyo: Echoes of the Past, a documentary exploring Goa's traditional folk-singing heritage.

== Recent developments ==
During the heavy monsoons of June 2020, some fields of Guirim were reported flooded. A flyover on the road highway cutting through Guirim was inaugurated in July 2020. Citizens, green campaigners, youth and local farmers sought to resuscitate coconut trees near the Guirim underpass in 2020. In February 2020, an issue broke out over the illegal mud-filling of Guirim lands and fields.

== Gallery ==
Life in Guirim

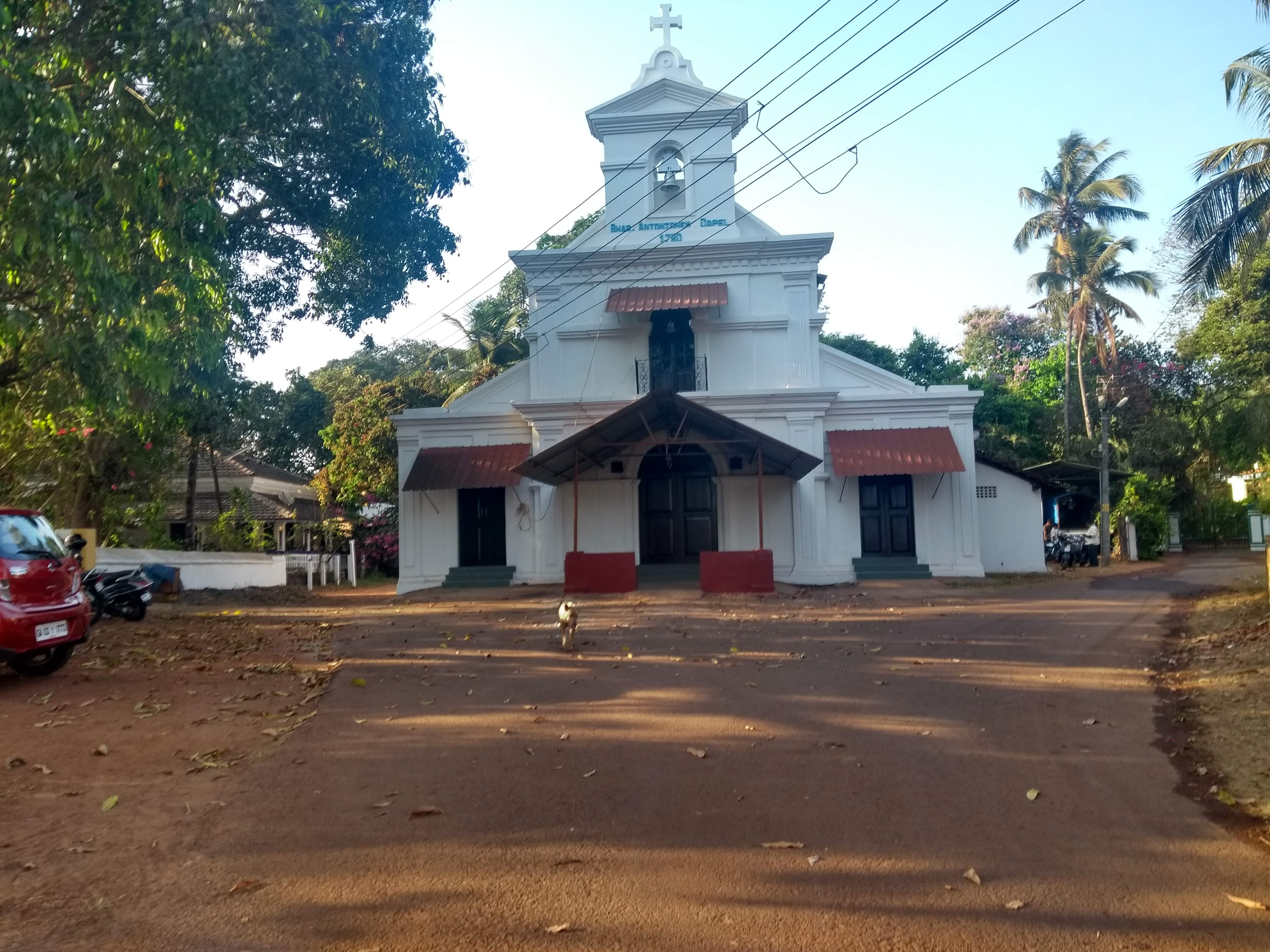
St Antonio Chapel

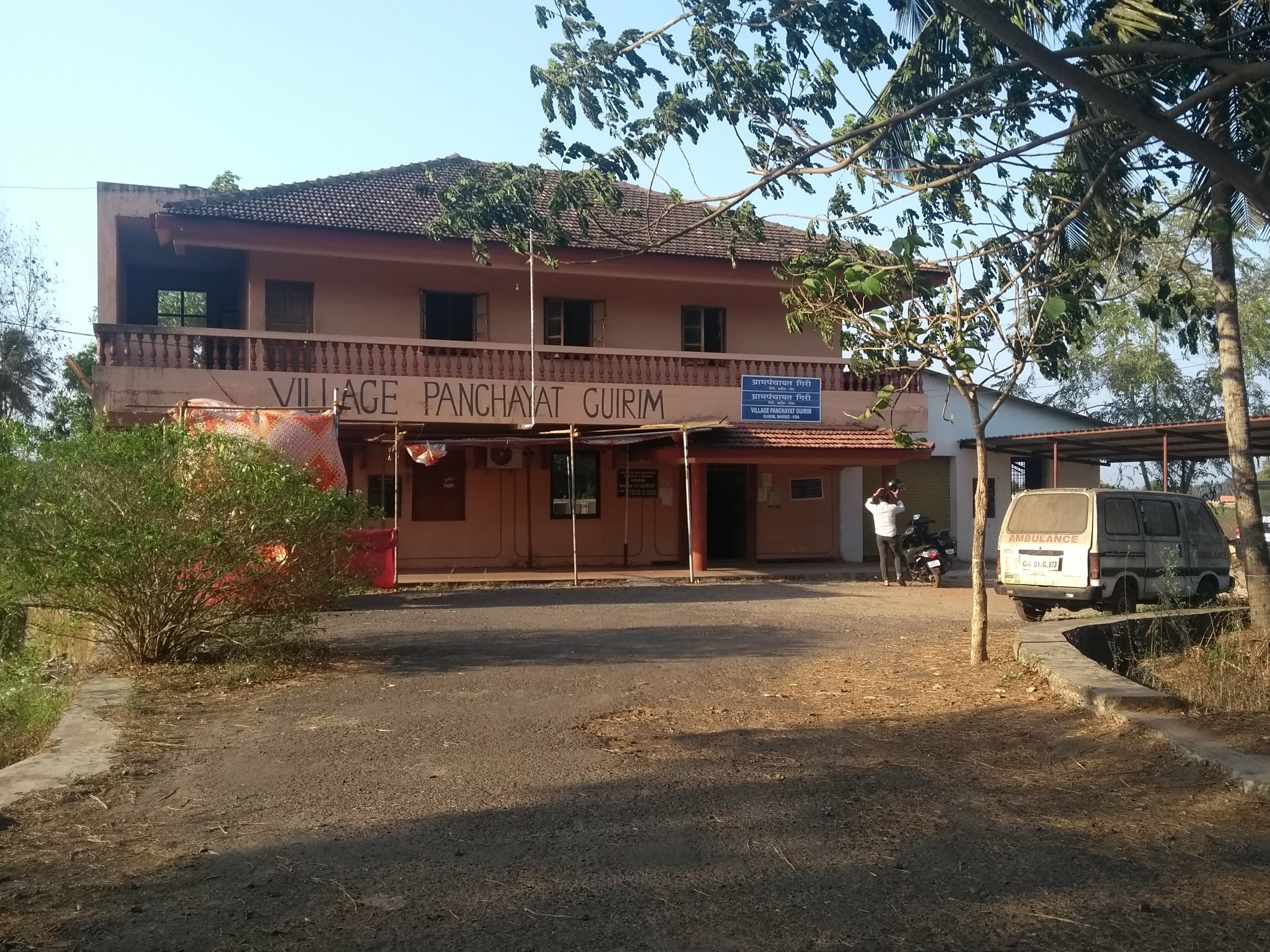
Village Panchayat

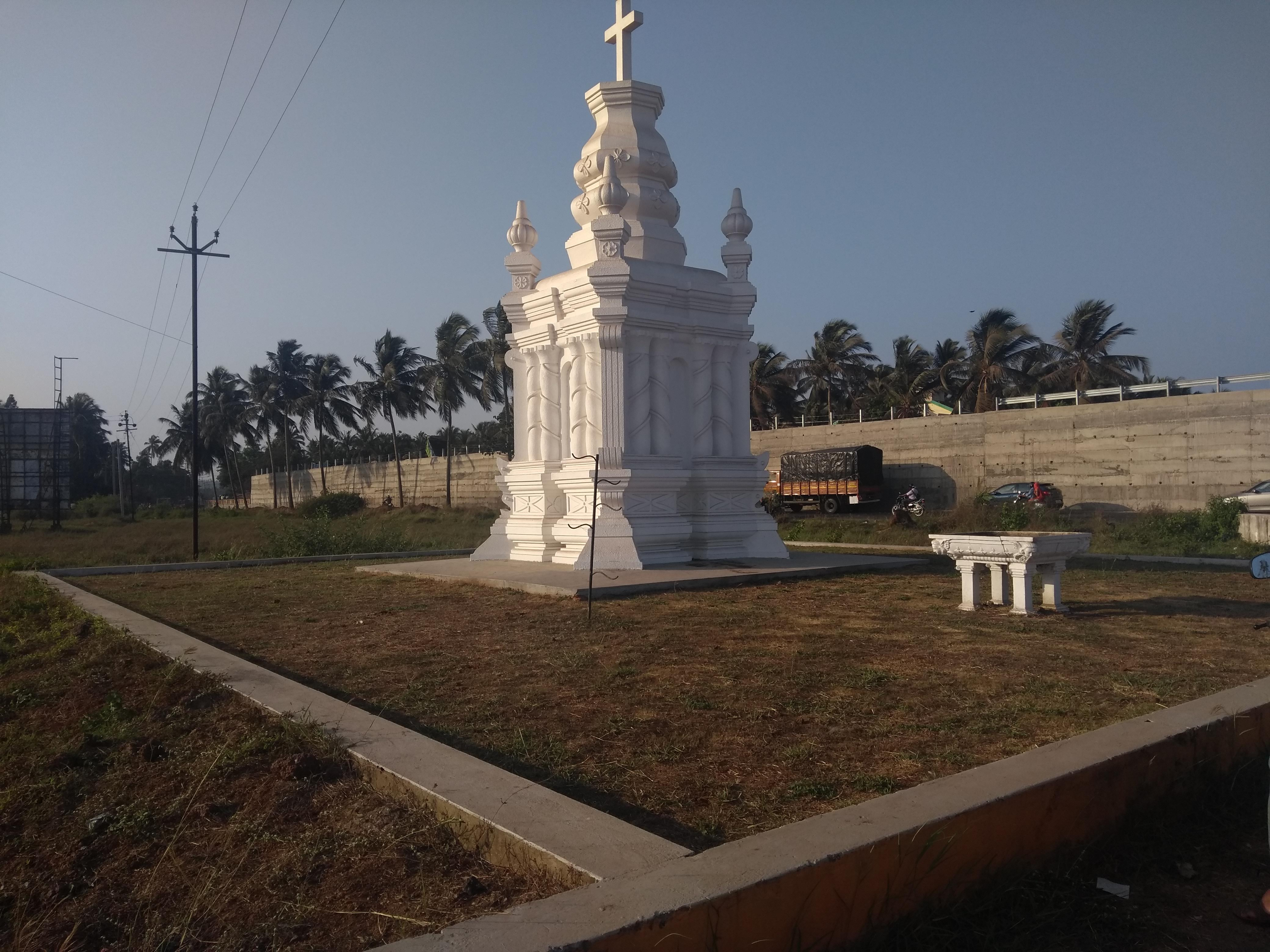
Guirim Cross

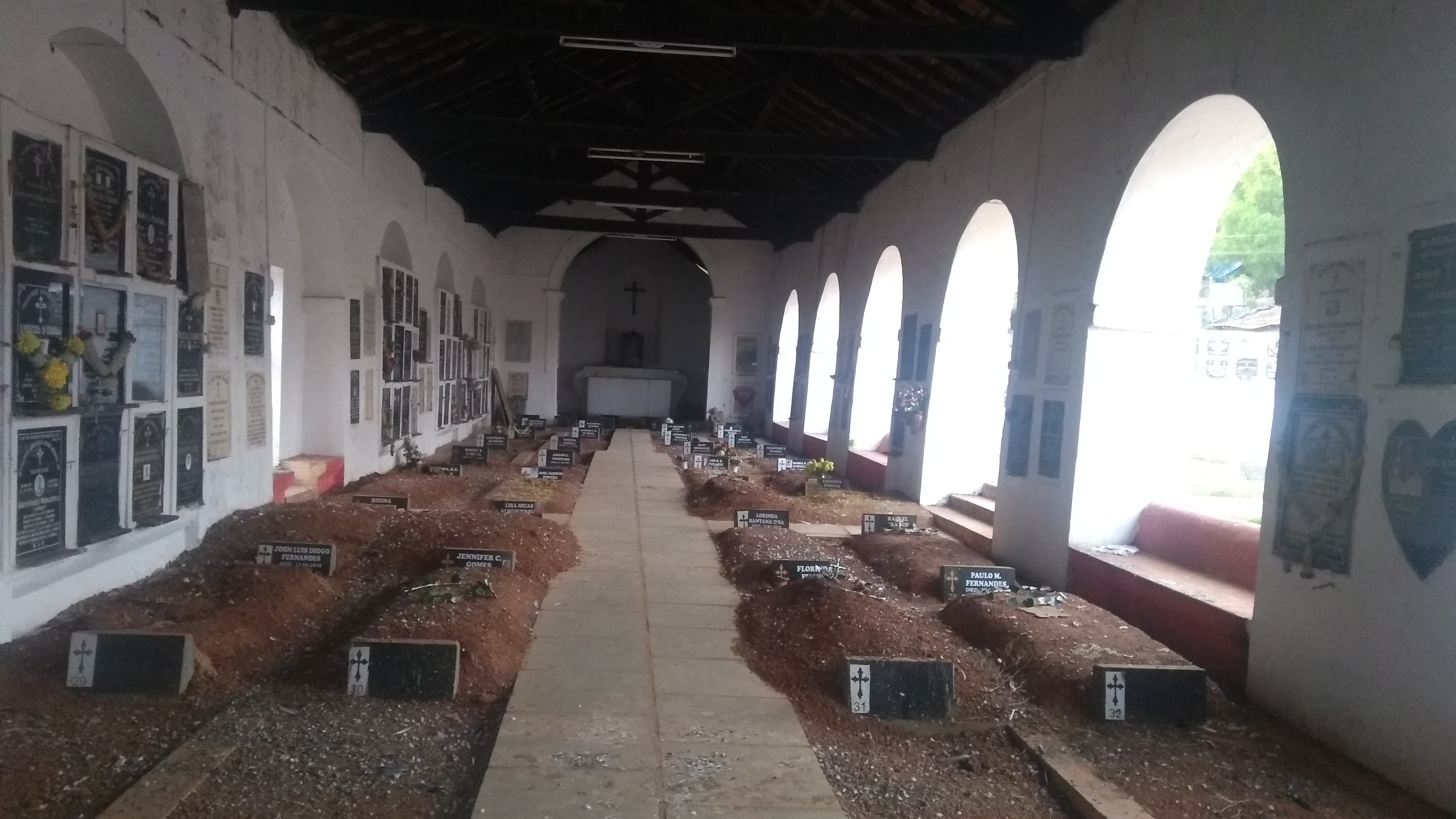
Village Cemetery
