= Aleixinho de Candolim =

Indian playwright and singer (1913–1963)

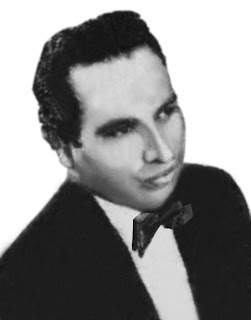
- Portrait of Fernandes during his youth
- Born: João Baptista Aleixinho Fernandes; 9 July 1913; Candolim, Goa, Portuguese India, Portuguese Empire (now in India)
- Died: 16 July 1963 (aged 50); Candolim, Goa, India
- Occupations: Playwright; director; singer; composer
- Years active: 1935–1962

João Baptista Aleixinho Fernandes (9 July 1913 – 16 July 1963), known professionally as Aleixinho de Candolim, was an Indian playwright, theatre director, singer, and composer who worked on the Konkani stage.

== Career ==
During the same era when J. P. Souzalin graced the Konkani stage in Bombay, another aspiring young man from Camotin-waddo, Candolim, emerged with a fervent desire to make his mark in Goa's theater scene. This individual was Fernandes, a 22-year-old who would later establish himself as a leading writer and director of Konkani stage plays, earning popular acclaim under the name "Aleixinho de Candolim." Fernandes was regarded as the pioneer who kick-started the tiatr movement on Goan soil. At the age of 22, Fernandes began crafting tiatrs and successfully staged his maiden play, Putanchi Duddvanchi Ass ani Avoichem Disgras, on 15 August 1935, coinciding with the feast day of the patroness Assumption of Blessed Virgin Mary at Candolim's Church of Our Lady of Hope (transl. Nossa Senhora de Esperança). This inaugural tiatr, featuring local artists and showcasing Fernandes' own compositions, struck a chord with the audience. Subsequently, Fernandes authored a multitude of tiatrs, collaborating with both local and commercial actors, and presenting his creations not only in Candolim but also in neighboring villages.

Fernandes swiftly gained prominence as a tiatr writer, composer, and singer. His popularity soared, with each of his compositions becoming a success. His reputation as a composer and vocalist earned him invitations to perform in tiatrs across the entire state of Goa. Fernandes soon became a household name, cherished and celebrated by the Goan populace. In 1939, Fernandes ventured to Bombay in search of employment, a path trodden by numerous Goan youth of that time. As fate would have it, German Pinto staged a tiatr at the Institute Luso Indiano on 11 November 1939, in Bombay during Fernandes' stay. Upon hearing of Fernandes' arrival, Pinto swiftly secured his services as a singer for his production. Fernandes mesmerized the Goan community in Bombay with his three renditions in the tiatr. This triumph led to an invitation to participate in another tiatr, directed by Cruz Jazzwala, held at the same venue on 6 January 1940. Once again, Fernandes captivated the audience with his performances. Writer Irene Cardozo writes, his talents and abilities established him as a cherished artist, commanding the respect and admiration of both tiatr directors and theatergoers in Bombay.

Fernandes soon became a highly sought-after talent, attracting the attention of popular writers and directors in Bombay's Konkani theater scene. Each aspired to enlist Fernandes for their own tiatrs. J. P. Souzalin, a leading director, was among the first to secure Fernandes' services, casting him in Bhott Ailolo Pomburpechea Festak (Hindu priest's arrival at Pomburpa's feast). This play, staged on 5 February 1940, at the Princess Theatre in Bhangwadi, Bombay, drew a full house. Fernandes contributed two new songs to this tiatr, titled "Ostori" and "Goenchea Alfani aile Bab," both of which became instant hits. Souzalin discerned Fernandes' prodigious talent and consistently included him in subsequent tiatrs. However, circumstances dictated that Fernandes could not secure his desired employment in Bombay, thus compelling his return to Goa. Nonetheless, Souzalin once again invited Fernandes to participate in his production, Pai Tujeach Tonddan Magon Ghetlen, bringing him back to Bombay specifically for this tiatr. As a result, Fernandes graced the stage in numerous performances, both in his own productions and those of others.

In the region of Goa, Fernandes embarked on a career as a playwright, crafting tiatrs that garnered substantial support from the local Goan population in both Goa itself and the city of Bombay. Despite being rooted in Goa, Fernandes regularly undertook biannual tours to Bombay, where he consistently entertained the Goan community with his theatrical group. During these visits, Fernandes incorporated several artists from Bombay into his ensemble, including Dioginho D'Mello and Baldin Araujo. One of Fernandes's contributions to the realm of tiatrs in Bombay was his role in expanding the geographical scope of performances. Prior to his ventures, Konkani tiatrs were primarily confined to the Dhobitalão area, whereas Fernandes was the first to bring tiatrs to locations such as Dadar, Mahim, Parel, and Poona. Consequently, Fernandes's initiatives paved the way for subsequent directors to stage their own tiatrs in these centers. Fernandes authored 27 tiatrs, including works such as Matarponn (Old Age), Goencho Posorkar (Goan Shopkeeper), Munddari, Bhasailolo Nouro, Mottorkar Ponk, Kuroikar, Aga Kumpar, Sezari (The Neighbour), St. Cecilia, Bhirankull Xevott (The Scary Ending), Vid Tiatristanchem, Eu Khuim vo Pescadores, Te Dogui Luche, Kallo Bazar Vo Black Market, Amcho Pordhes, Bebdeacho Estad, Miss 1951, Festache Ferientlem Ful, Cheddvankar, Mhuzo Ghov Basurkar, Millionar (Millionaire), Bhurgeankar, Omtea Kollxear Udok, and Amchea Xetachi Pavnni (The Auction of Our Field). Moreover, he actively composed and performed numerous songs within the tiatrs, some of which continue to be broadcast on radio platforms today. Some examples of his popular compositions include "Fatima Saibinn," "Cazari Bhoinni," "Bailek Bhieta," and "Dadlea."

Three tiatrs that deserve special recognition are To Bavtto Dhormancho, Ram Ram Bhaoji, and Sounsarant Konn Konnancho?. These productions achieved success, drawing substantial audiences at each performance. Amchea Xetachi Pavnni marked Fernandes's final tiatr showcased in Bombay. Known for his aptitude as an actor, Fernandes meticulously studied each role prior to commencing rehearsals, and he expected a similar commitment from the actors in his tiatrs. Like J. P. Souzalin, Fernandes strove for excellence in his productions and actively fostered emerging talent, thereby making a significant contribution to the growth of Konkani theater. He is known for his songs that continue to be aired on All India Radio in Bombay and Panaji. His vocal recordings are preserved by All India Radio on Gramophone Company India and tapes, ensuring that future generations of tiatr enthusiasts can enjoy his music. Fernandes occupied a pivotal position in preserving the tradition of Konkani tiatr during a critical juncture, as aptly noted by Konkani historian Wilson Mazarello.

== Personal life ==
João Baptista Aleixinho Fernandes was born on 9 July 1913, in Camotim-waddo, Candolim, Goa, which was then part of Portuguese India during the Portuguese Empire. Fernandes exhibited a fervent passion for music and acting from an early age. His talent for singing was honed while attending the local parochial school, where he had the opportunity to perform hymns. At the age of 16, Fernandes began showcasing his vocal prowess by singing Konkani songs in village concerts. These concerts, a customary part of the village church feasts, provided a platform for local boys and girls to exhibit their talents. It was during one such concert that Fernandes made his debut on stage. His composition and performance of a song received admiration from the audience, serving as a significant catalyst for his career.

Rapidly gaining fame, Fernandes became widely known for his singing abilities and his gift for songwriting. His compositions were characterized by vivid imagery, showcasing his imaginative and visionary nature. Moreover, Fernandes had a unique singing style. His contributions extended beyond music, as he held a deep affection for his native village, adopting the stage name Aleixinho de Candolim to honor his roots. On 16 July 1963, Fernandes died in his hometown of Candolim, Goa, aged 50.

== Analysis ==
Fernandes tiatrs garnered lasting acclaim, transcending more than five decades since his demise. Popular among his repertoire are works such as Mhatarponn, Amcho Pordes, Gõycho Posorkar, To Bavtto Dhormacho, Mhozo Ghov Basurkar, Ram Ram Baoji, Bhasailolo Nouro, Sonvsarant Konn Konnacho?, Omtea Kollxear Udok, and Amchea Xetachi Pavnni. A careful analysis of Fernandes's tiatrs reveals his astute awareness of prevailing social issues, with a dual aim of entertainment and education. His plays predominantly grapple with social themes, striving to uphold moral values and propose resolutions. Fernandes's tiatr Amchea Xetachi Pavnni aligns with the tradition of protest theater, bearing resemblance to the pioneering work of Brazilian director Augusto Boal's Theatre of the Oppressed.

In Mhatarponn, Fernandes portrays the mistreatment of elderly parents by their own children, delivering a cautionary message about the potential repercussions when these sons themselves age and face similar neglect. Gõycho Posorkar delves into the realm of shopkeepers in the Portuguese era in Goa, distinguishing between those who aided impoverished customers and those who exploited them through exorbitant pricing. By advocating for strict action against errant shopkeepers and recognition for the virtuous ones, Fernandes voices his concerns through this tiatr. The migration of Goans seeking livelihoods in the Gulf countries has been a prevalent phenomenon, paralleling Fernandes's era when many individuals sought prosperity in Basura. Mhozo Ghov Basurkar encapsulates this dynamic, urging parents of prospective brides to prioritize qualities over monetary considerations when selecting suitors. To Bavtto Dhormacho explores various facets of social life, with Fernandes emphasizing the significance of the revered Holy Cross among Goans.

Amchea Xetachi Pavnni, staged for the first time by Fernandes in Candolim on Easter Sunday in April 1962, sheds light on the plight of tenants (munddkars) during the Portuguese regime in Goa. These tenants toiled on lands owned by landlords (bhattkars), who disproportionately reaped the profits. The landlords wielded considerable power, instilling fear that inhibited tenants from expressing their grievances. Following Goa's liberation, Fernandes exposed the tyranny and exploitation faced by tenants, advocating fervently for their rights and justice. Staging a tiatr critical of landlords during the Portuguese era was a formidable task, yet Fernandes persevered, championing the cause of the marginalized and amplifying their voices through his play.

== Selected stage works ==
| Year | Title | Role | Notes | Ref |
|---|---|---|---|---|
| 1935 | Putanchi Duddvanchi Ass ani Avoichem Disgras | Writer/director | Professional debut | |
| 1939 | Untitled tiatr | Singer | | |
| 1940 | Untitled tiatr | Singer | | |
| 1940 | Bhott Ailolo Pomburpechea Festak | Singer | | |
| 1940s | Pai Tujeach Tonddan Magon Ghetlen | Singer | | |
| | Matarponn | Writer/director | | |
| | Goencho Posorkar | Writer/director | | |
| | Munddari | Writer/director | | |
| | Bhasailolo Nouro | Writer/director | | |
| | Mottorkar Ponk | Writer/director | | |
| | Kuroikar | Writer/director | | |
| | Aga Kumpar | Writer/director | | |
| | Sezari | Writer/director | | |
| | St. Cecilia | Writer/director | | |
| | Bhirankull Xevott | Writer/director | | |
| | Vid Tiatristanchem | Writer/director | | |
| | Eu Khuim vo Pescadores | Writer/director | | |
| | Te Dogui Luche | Writer/director | | |
| | Kallo Bazar Vo Black Market | Writer/director | | |
| | Amcho Pordhes | Writer/director | | |
| | Bebdeacho Estad | Writer/director | | |
| | Miss 1951 | Writer/director | | |
| | Festache Ferientlem Ful | Writer/director | | |
| | Cheddvankar | Writer/director | | |
| | Mhuzo Ghov Basurkar | Writer/director | | |
| | Millionar | Writer/director | | |
| | Bhurgeankar | Writer/director | | |
| | Omtea Kollxear Udok | Writer/director | | |
| 1961/1962 | Amchea Xetachi Pavnni | Writer/director | Final production | |
