= Municipal councillor (India) =

Elected representative local government

Municipal Councillor(India) or ward councillor is an elected representative through municipal elections for a City's Municipal Corporation. The Constitution (SEVENTY-FOURTH AMENDMENT) ACT, 1992 lays down the provision for election of Municipal Councillors. They play an important role in selection of Mayor and representing their wards for many infrastructure and other development activities in their ward. They are helpful in the development of country by participating through local political bodies. They are also the closest link between Government and people.

== Election ==
Municipal Councillors election for municipal corporation had been specified in The Indian Constitution (Seventy-Fourth Amendment) Act, 1992. Municipal Councillors are members of local municipal corporation and representatives of citizens in a given place. They are elected during local body elections held in each state every five years. They represent the local political party. or fight as Independents not representing any political organisation. They play an important role in facilitation of Government schemes reaching to local people. Municipal Councillors play a major role in election of Mayor for city.

== Eligibility ==
Following are the eligibility to contest as Municipal Councillors:

- Any gender
- 21 years old
- Name appears in Official Voters list
- No formal education is needed
- No maximum age limit

== Roles and responsibilities ==
Following are their roles and responsibilities:

- Participating in development and evaluation of programmes conducted by municipality.
- Working for the welfare and interests of the people in municipal corporation they are elected to represent.
- Participate in election of town Mayor.
- Take care of civic related issues such as road laying, development of infrastructure, issues related to town planning, disposal of waste management.
- Activities relating to promotion of education, guidelines on public health, community welfare, public safety and other local development issues.
- Promote programmes on development and cultural and other aesthetic related ones.
- Approval of local development plans.
- Listen to issues faced by people locally and address them.

== See also ==
- List of municipal corporations in India
