= Multilingual writer =

Person who writes in more than one language

A multilingual writer is a person who has the ability to write in two or more languages, or in more than one dialect of a language. Depending on the situation and the environment, these writers are often identified with many labels, such as second-language writers, non-native speakers, language learners, and many others. In Life as a Bilingual by François Grosjean, it is mentioned that approximately 50% to 70% of the world’s population is bilingual.

Multilingual writers have the ability to be more aware of many aspects of their writing process and their final product. In addition, the domain of two or more languages and dialects allows these writers to have unique rhetorical perspectives and a remarkable ability to perform the skills at hand. Multilingual writers are often discouraged because they are held to native-speaker or monolingual standards, and most educational systems end up discouraging multilingual literacy.

== Writer identity for multilingual writers ==
For Multilingual Writers, developing a writer's identity requires time and an adequate environment to develop. Being in a learning environment that fosters one’s writing identity can be impactful for multilingual students.

An academic study done by Barbara Bird, Dough Downs, Moriah McCraken, and Jan Reiman from “Next Steps: New Directions for/ in Writing about Writing” looks into the study of how the Writing Studies 101 course and “Bridging program” classes help positively impact students' search for their voice and expand their writing knowledge.

The study the scholars carried out was a “case-based reflection” on students who are English language learners trying to find their writing identity in “Writing Studies 101: Exploring Writing, a first-year, contract- and portfolio-graded workshop course at the University of Alberta”. They studied students' reflections and referenced them in their articles as evidence.

The scholars found that these classes aid multilingual students in rediscovering their voices and learning to incorporate their mother language into their brainstorming and writing. They also discovered that for students who liberate their speaking voice, their writing voices would come after and this is seen with students sharing their ideas through talking and writing. Through reading a diverse variety of literature, students in the class could also gain inspiration in shaping their identity by trying to apply other people's writing styles to their works. This process would then allow students to find their style of writing over time.

Another realization for the scholars is incorporating different writing activities for students to allow them to further their writing identity: They specifically mentioned that “low-stakes generative writing” which includes freewriting, copious writing, etc., can improve fluency, and the focus and understanding of difficult texts.

The “WRS 101” class’ use of generative writing and integrating feedback strategies helps multilingual students discover newly founded identities that do not exclude their other identities. This class helps guide students out of linguistic deprivation and instead allows them to be more engaged in learning their writing journey and express their own writing styles. It also improves self-efficacy.

== Translingualism in multilingual writing ==
Translingualism is an intellectual movement that contributes to the pedagogy and philosophy of writing. This applies to multilingual writers who utilize various linguistic features in speaking and writing. There is a relationship with the process of code-meshing in writing, leading to the development of unique writing identities for many multilingual individuals.

Teachers can be open to understanding the different linguistic variations that their students may use and how they can be applied to different scenarios in writing when applicable. As there are different modes of linguistic variation in communication, different levels of usage are involved.

== Pedagogy in multilingual writing ==
Teachers are looking into the student writer's identity regarding academic writing and different academic expectations. They discovered that there is a demand for more care and attention to the use of language in teaching. Writing is not simply about building the “basics” of academic writing taught in middle and high school.

A study done by George Mason University showed that multilingual students felt a great change in their writing identities when they changed their languages to English. Students desire more guidance in the learning process of writing academically and developing academic writing proficiency.

Students who write in their native language connect to their culture which provides them with a more “rich” and descriptive writing experience than when they wrote in English. This finding entailed that students felt limited in their writing in the English language.

As a result, students would like to learn how to use their native language’s voice more in writing in English. Teachers can support this desire by being open to student suggestions and learning their writing styles, ideas, and categories to understand the diverse language and writing methods students need to succeed in writing in English.

=== Multilingual teachers in writing ===
It isn’t only students who go through the exploration of writing and shaping their writer's identity; teachers do too. Some teachers are also multilingual and are searching for their writing identity as well.

Research by Dorthy Worden Chambers and Analeigh E. Horton found that there is an increasing diversity in the population of current and future teachers of writing. This is beneficial for students but it is also necessary to put in time and care to develop the teacher's identity. A literacy narrative project is an assignment for teachers to develop their identity, to learn and improve their language and literacy skills to know the discussions of “standard” language ideologies. Teachers create new identities and foster new teaching strategies through their learning process and use them to cater to their students’ identities in multi-literacy, “multilingual, and multi-competent identities.”

The main takeaway from this research is that there are limitations to teachers relying on “traditional” teaching ideas. The limitations are more prominent in participant Lee’s findings where teachers deal with constraints trying to develop their desired identities in their workplace. It is important to allow teachers more time to explore and learn about language and literacy and ideologies that create language “stereotypes” to discover their own identities. They then create a teaching style that values their students’ multicultural and linguistic identities in writing.

== Challenges multilingual writers' experience in writing ==
Some challenges that student face when switching their first language (L1) to their second language (L2) happen during their transition from first language (L1) written classes to second language (L2) written classes and any challenges that arise within this scope. Alvares, Wan, and Lee highlight the mental strain of self-censorship, noting that students often feel force to clean up their natural voices to meet academic expectations.Likewise, AJ Outlar describes this as divided experience. This experience where the pressure to conform to a traditional audience can result in a refined style of writing that ultimately feels detached from the writer's voice and lacks their opinion.

In the Journal of Second Language Writing by Diane Belcher and Alan Hirvela, they looked into the various identities of multilingual writers transitioning from L1 writing class to L2 classes and realized that there is often not enough attention put into understanding students' experiences in transitioning their writing “voices” from the “L1” to “L2” writing classes.

Research from Diane Belcher and Alan Hirvela illustrates that the definition of a writer's voice comes with challenges with a lack of research on how voice may be taught to the students. More effort needs to be put into understanding the writers' identities and their conception of what writing is through their voices. Kristin DeMin Baily, An Ha, and AJ Outlar suggest that these challenges are exacerbated by writing scars, which are traumas from past instances where students were ashamed or harshly criticized for their natural linguistic expression. These experiences can lead to long term writing difficulties, such as frequent doubt about grammar, word choices, or sentence structure, which may prevent writers from expressing their ideas clearly.

Three case studies were implemented on three Latin American graduate writing students with the focus on voice as an “analytical” tool to learn about the struggles of the students transitioning from one writing class “L1” to another “L2”. Essentially, the experience of multilingual writers is affected by the breakdown use of “voice”; a usual marker that relates to identity and self-characterization.

Scholars discovered that there is not enough attention put into understanding the students’ experiences in the “L1” writing class and their transition goals into developing a “voice” in the “L2” class.

Institutional expectations and language ideologies often link racial identity to assumptions about linguistic ability. This racialization of language often results in a double standard where the bilingualism of high status individuals is praised as an asset while the multilingualism of international or immigrant students is viewed as a problem to be fixed. A case study by Hugo Virrueta and Dr. Rachel Herzl-Betz identifies this as a rhetorical negotiation, where students decide if using their native language is a genuine expression of identity to meet the committee's expectations. Rather than viewing a student's home language as a loss, the translingual framework highlights how students use their entire linguistic background as a resource for completing school assignments. Nelson Flores explains this through the concept of white listening, which is when schools judge the writing of students of color strictly by standard English rules. Constant self-correction makes it harder for students to find their own voice when they have to change their writing just to fit into school standards.

Flores uses the metaphor of language architecture to describe how students develop their writing. In this model, writing is compared to building a structure where students’ home language is seen as a valuable building material rather than a problem. This perspective treats a student’s past experiences and native languages as useful tools that support their growth as academic writers. When students navigate these expectations successfully, they experience guilt, doubt and shame for not taking the academic risk of using their linguistic identity. Student self-doubt in academic writing is often caused by people judging them, rather than a lack of writing skills. Scholar An Ha describes this gap in expectations as linguistic privilege, where success depends on how closely a student's home language matches the vocabulary used in wealthy schools.

Research is important and necessary to face the definition of the voice of a writer which comes with challenges to gain a greater understanding of the voices and identities of multilingual writers that already exist. More research is needed to look into how voice may be taught to the students and put more effort into understanding the identities of the writers and their conception of what writing is through their voice.

== Multilingual writers in college ==
Multilingual writers in college often face unique challenges in academic writing contexts, where monolingual norms are generalized. In this context, multilingual students frequently need assistance and support from additional campus resources, one of the main sources being the university writing center. The research underscores the necessity of providing tailored support to these students from writing centers while highlighting the lack of adjustment and teaching awareness for multilingual college writers. Institutional responses to multilingual students are often influenced by tensions between increasing linguistic diversity and English language ideologies. Although international students and domestic multilingual learners are becoming more visible in postsecondary education, they are often viewed as temporary members of the academic community rather than as a lasting part of campus life. Scholars note that institutions frequently place greater emphasis on how these students should adapt to existing academic expectations than on reconsidering the language standards used to evaluate their writing. Effective tutoring for multilingual students requires a focus on understanding linguistic experiences, maintaining open attitudes, and employing inclusive practices. Collaboration between multilingual writers and tutors-in-training is also beneficial, where both groups enhance their skills and develop a greater appreciation for linguistic diversity.

Besides finding assistance from writing centers, self-directed study is also an essential process for multilingual students to learn college-level writing. Self-directed language development, while beneficial, is most effective when paired with structured, classroom-based language instruction to address the diverse needs of first-year multilingual writers. Linguistically responsive writing programs advocate for instruction that adapts to students’ backgrounds to boost writing confidence and self-efficacy. The CCCC's 2018 statement on second language writing also calls for equitable practices that recognize the assets multilingual writers bring to academic discourse.

== Multilingual literacy programs ==
Around the world, educational institutions are creating programs to encourage multilingual literacy and give tools and support to multilingual writers. For example, in the United States, The Norman E. Eberly Multilingual Writing Center at Dickinson College is an ongoing program that benefits multilingual students by giving them a space where their abilities are appreciated and they are given tools that help their learning process as well as the knowledge they put out to the world.

== List of multilingual writers ==
- Samuel Beckett, Irish born writer who wrote in French and English
- Pierre Cormon, Swiss French author who wrote books in French, English and Brazilian Portuguese
- Guillermo del Toro. Mexican filmmaker and author.
- W. E. B. Du Bois American-Ghanaian sociologist and activist.
- Junot Díaz Dominican-American writer, academic, and editor.
- Kahlil Gibran Lebanese American artist, poet, and writer.
- Ariel Dorfman. Argentine-Chilean writer and human rights activist.
- Xiaolu Guo. Chinese-British novelist and film director.
- Eva Hoffman. Polish-American writer and academic.
- Kazuo Ishiguro. Japanese-British novelist.
- Jack Kerouac. American writer.
- Milan Kundera, Czech and French novelist who wrote books in Czech and French
- Jhumpa Lahiri. American author.
- Vladimir Nabokov Russian-American novelist.
- Albert Sánchez Piñol, Catalan author who writes in Catalan and Spanish.
- Yōko Tawada, Japanese writer writing in Japanese and German
- Ngũgĩ wa Thiong'o, Kenyan author who wrote in English and then switched to Kikuyu
