= Sonapur, Bhandup =

Sonapur
- Urban
- Sonapur, Bhandup West
- Location in Maharashtra, India Sonapur (India) Sonapur (Asia)
- Coordinates: 19.16°N 72.93°E
- Country: India
- State: Maharashtra
- District: Mumbai Suburban
- Division: Konkan
- Postal Index Number: 400078
- Vehicle registration: MH- 03 (Eastern Suburbs)

Sonapur is an urban area in Bhandup, Mumbai, Maharashtra state of India.
