= Anthony De Sa (actor) =

Indian actor and singer (1915–1969)

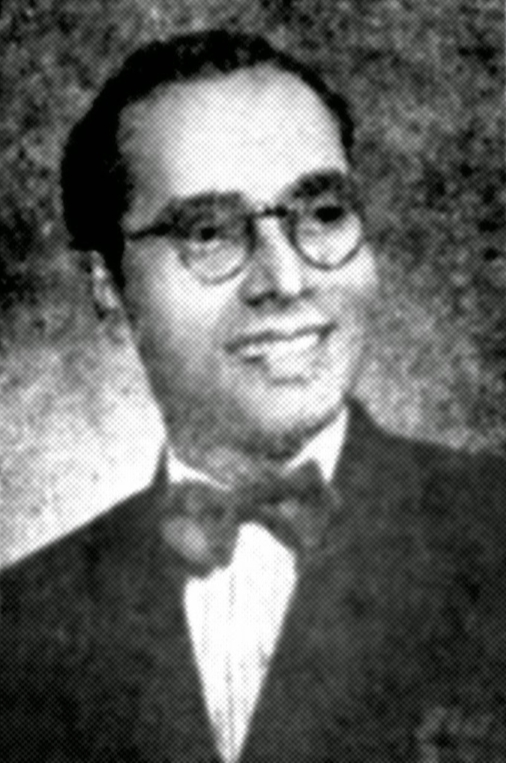
- Portrait of De Sa during his youth
- Born: 1 March 1915; Cuncolim, Goa, Portuguese India
- Died: 10 July 1969 (aged 54); Dhobitalao, Bombay, Maharashtra, India
- Other names: Anthony D'Sa
- Occupations: Actor; playwright; theatre director; singer; composer
- Years active: 1933–1969
- Notable work: Amchem Noxib (1963); Nirmon (1966)

Anthony De Sa (1 March 1915 – 10 July 1969) was an Indian actor, playwright, theatre director, singer, and composer known for his work in Konkani films and tiatr productions.

== Career ==
De Sa commenced his acting career at the age of 18 in 1933, in Bombay (now Mumbai). His passion for the stage led him to write his first tiatr, a form of Konkani theater, at that age. Despite his early enthusiasm for acting and singing, De Sa faced familial resistance as his family disdained tiatrs and tiatrists. His family, belonging to an aristocratic background, viewed performing on a Konkani stage as beneath their social standing. Consequently, De Sa was compelled to conceal his love for the Konkani stage for the time being. However, his affection for singing and acting drove him to take action. An opportunity arose when De Sa traveled to Bombay for his studies and resided in a village club. The club members collectively decided to stage a tiatr and, recognizing De Sa's superior education and intellectual capabilities, approached him to write the script.

Despite being a mere 18-year-old student, De Sa readily accepted the challenge, driven by his deep-seated passion for singing and acting. Thus, he composed his debut tiatr script titled Zhuz Mogachem (Battle for Love). However, numerous obstacles hindered the staging of this tiatr at the Princess Theatre in Bhangwadi, Bombay. Initially, the Hindu-Muslim riots erupted, resulting in a citywide curfew that prohibited the staging of dramas. Consequently, the performance had to be postponed. Additionally, De Sa encountered difficulties in obtaining permission from the City Police Commissioner due to concerns about potential disturbances. Undeterred, De Sa confronted these challenges and successfully convinced the City Police Commissioner to grant special permission. Finally, the tiatr was staged and received favorable reception from the audience. Konkani tiatr directors Saib Rocha and J.P. Souzalin were among the spectators, appreciating De Sa's talents.

Impressed by De Sa's singing abilities, J.P. Souzalin promptly recruited him to perform the opening song in his next tiatr. De Sa, a singer with a distinctive style, appeared before the director in his finest attire, complete with gloves and a hat reminiscent of English actors. Despite feeling initially overwhelmed by the director's approach, De Sa accepted the offer. However, he had no predetermined idea about the type of song he would perform for the director. Consequently, he composed an English song with a translated Konkani version for the opening act. This innovative style secured De Sa a regular place as the opening song performer in subsequent tiatrs. Previously, the prerogative of singing the opening song had belonged to established singers such as Patrick Fireman, Luis Borges, Emidio Sailor, Anthony Vaz, Souza Ferrão, and Dioginho de Mello. However, De Sa's debut in J.P. Souzalin's tiatr disrupted this tradition. From then on, he became the exclusive performer of the opening song in every tiatr. De Sa's higher level of education distinguished him from his fellow singers on stage, enabling him to effortlessly compose and perform English and Konkani songs for the opening act.

De Sa's musical compositions were known for their quality, surpassing those of his contemporaries. Author Sharon Mazarello writes, his compositions resonated with the audience, eliciting applause and showcasing his depth as a composer. With a pleasant and powerful voice, De Sa's performances on stage captivated listeners. He held the position of the opening singer in tiatrs for many years. As his career progressed, De Sa also ventured into acting, starting with smaller roles and gradually honing his skills. Konkani historian Wilson Mazarello writes, with time, he emerged as an accomplished actor, taking on more significant and challenging roles. His meticulous approach involved studying each character in detail and bringing them to life on stage. De Sa earned the admiration of J.P. Souzalin, who frequently entrusted him with main roles in his tiatrs. De Sa's portrayal of Jesus Christ in religious tiatrs was highly favored by Souzalin. One of his most memorable performances was as Jesus in J.P. Souzalin's Sat Dukhi (Seven Sorrows), which left an impression on the audience.

After establishing himself as an actor, De Sa delved into the realm of playwriting, penning a total of 17 original tiatrs. Additionally, he undertook the task of revising and directing 24 tiatrs written by various playwrights. Some of his works include Rogtachi Bhett (The Blood Sacrifice), Ghatkem Kumsar, Vingans, Maim ti Maim (Mother is Mother), Soddtam Devache Nitik, Farikponn (Debt), Dotor Fottas, Nirbhag Axechem, Nores Fonddpi, Patok Dubavachem (The Sin of Doubt), Inam Zolmancho, Goemkarancheo Sonvoleom, Nisontton Fuddarachem, Inam Patkacho, Ayah and Lojechem Boglantt (Shameful Calumny). De Sa's talents extended beyond the stage. He has had several of his songs recorded by HMV Records, including "Ankvar Dovortolem", "Irene Mhaka Rabta", and "Kai Borem Tem Mannkulem". He has also appeared in two Konkani films, Amchem Noxib and Nirmon, where his portrayal of a villain in the latter film received particular acclaim. De Sa has been a regular artist in plays organized by All India Radio (Bombay), with some of his recorded songs broadcast by All India Radio (Bombay) and Panaji.

Wilson Mazarello further writes, De Sa initially began his career as a singer in J. P. Souzalin's tiatr, but he ultimately made a significant impact, earning similar levels of popularity, respect, and dedication to the Konkani stage as his director. While not reaching the same level of acclaim as a writer as J. P. Souzalin, De Sa played a pivotal role in upholding the honor and prestige of the Konkani tiatr during the first half of the 20th century. His contributions were instrumental in bringing respect and dignity to the Konkani stage, as noted by Mazarello. De Sa has been involved in over 300 tiatr performances, both in his own productions and in collaborations with others. He has also recorded music for numerous HMV Records and has toured various locations including Bombay, Poona, Goa, and East Africa. His final self-produced work, Ghatkem Kumsar, was staged at Tejpal Hall in Bombay on 12 February 1969. Sharon Mazarello further writes, known for his meticulous approach to direction and his pursuit of excellence from his performers, De Sa earned the respect of his peers and collaborators. His last appearance was in M. Boyer's Atam Konn Ghatki? at Damodar Hall in Parel, Bombay on 28 February 1969. Despite starting his career as a singer, De Sa's impact as an actor and director has been widely recognized, as noted by Mazarello.

== Personal life ==
Anthony De Sa was born on 1 March 1915, in Dandora ward in the town of Cuncolim, Goa, which was part of Portuguese India during the Portuguese Empire. He was the son of Marcus Antonio Benedicto de Sa and Agatha Ernestina Gracias. De Sa had a brother who was a priest and known for his oratory skills. On July 10, 1969, De Sa died in Dhobitalao, Bombay, at the age of 54.

== Legacy ==
In February 2015, the Indian Postal Service announced its plans to commemorate the birth centenary of De Sa. As part of the celebration, they planned to release a special postal cover with a unique cancellation mark. The honor of applying the cancellation mark was bestowed upon Charles Lobo, the Post Master General of Goa. The unveiling ceremony and cancellation mark application were scheduled to take place on 1 March at the Municipal hall in Cuncolim. In addition to the postal cover release, a tribute was planned for De Sa in his hometown. The road leading to De Sa's residence in Dandora, Cuncolim, was to be officially named "Anthony De Sa Rosto," signifying its association with the individual. The event was jointly organized by the Tiatr Academy of Goa (TAG) and the Cuncolim Municipal Council (CMC).

On 1 March 2015, the Department of India Post fulfilled its commitment by officially launching the special postal cover in Cuncolim. Charles Lobo, along with several dignitaries, presided over the ceremony. These dignitaries included Landry Mascarenhas, the Chairperson of the Cuncolim Municipal Council, Prince Jacob, the President of TAG, and Fr Manuel Fernandes from the Our Lady of Health Church in Cuncolim. During the event, Fr Manuel shared his personal connection with De Sa's brother, who was well known for his sermons. Landry expressed his pride in having the road named after Anthony De Sa, particularly since he himself hailed from the same ward in Dandora, Cuncolim. Joe Rose, the Vice President of TAG, delivered a vote of thanks and reminisced about his early encounters with De Sa when they both embarked on their tiatr journeys as young individuals.

== Selected stage works ==
Year	Title	Role	Notes	Ref
1933	Zhuz Mogachem	Writer	Professional debut	
1960s	Saibinnicheo Sat Dukhi	Jesus Christ		
1969	Ghatkem Kumsar	Writer/producer		
1969	Atam Konn Ghatki	Actor/performer	Final production	
