= Dhobitalao =

- neighbourhood
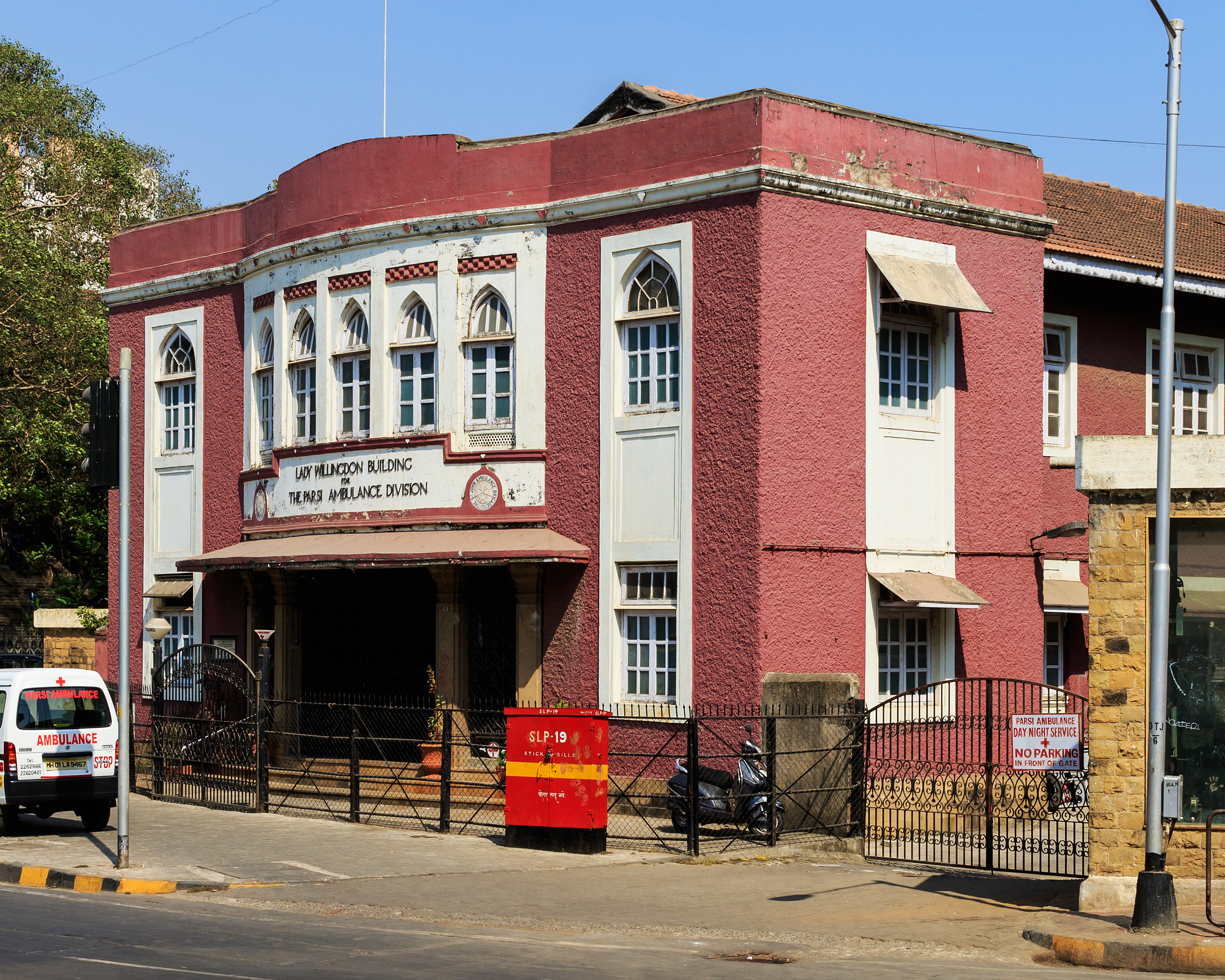
- Parsi Hospital at Dhobitalao

- Location within Mumbai
- Coordinates: 18.9433°N 72.8286°E
- Country: India
- State: Maharashtra
- District: Mumbai City
- Metro: Mumbai
- Zone: 1
- Ward: A and C

Government
  - Body: MCGM
- Elevation: 11 m (36 ft)

Languages
  - Official: Marathi
- Time zone: UTC+5:30 (IST)
- PIN: 400 002
- Lok Sabha constituency: Mumbai South
- Vidhan Sabha constituency: Colaba
- Civic agency: MCGM

Dhobitalao ("Washerman's Lake") is a neighborhood in the city of Mumbai (formerly Bombay), in India. Located in the South Mumbai area at an elevation of 11 m (31 ft), it used to be a location where linen was washed. In British times, dhobis used to wash the British soldiers clothes here. It was filled up in the mid-17th century, as the city began to expand. The lake used to be fed by a number of underground freshwater springs, which were recently uncovered while constructing the subway in the locality.

A public library stands over the land that was the lake. Just off the current site, is the famous Metro Adlabs (formerly Metro Cinema).

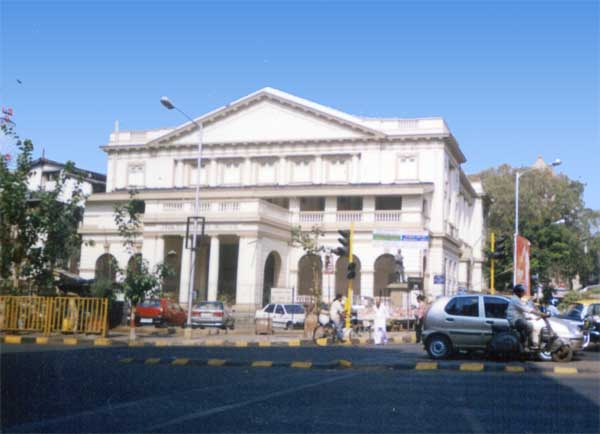
The Framjee Cowasjee hall is built over the Framjee Cowasjee tank

The north-eastern part of Dhobitalao is called Cavel, from the Koli name Kolwar. The Kolis of this village were converted to Christianity by the Portuguese in the 16th century. Cavel became a Christian enclave, and later immigrants of this religion, from Goa, Daman, Bassein, and Salsette settled here. Other Christian enclaves in Dhobitalao are Sonapur and Dabul.

Dhobitalao is home to the highest number of kudds, Goan clubs that house migrants from Goan villages seeks opportunities and employment in Mumbai.

== Institutions ==
- Metro Adlabs
- St Xavier's College
- St. Xavier's High School, Fort
- GT Hospital
- ESIS Hospital
