= Carmen Rose =

Indian singer and actress

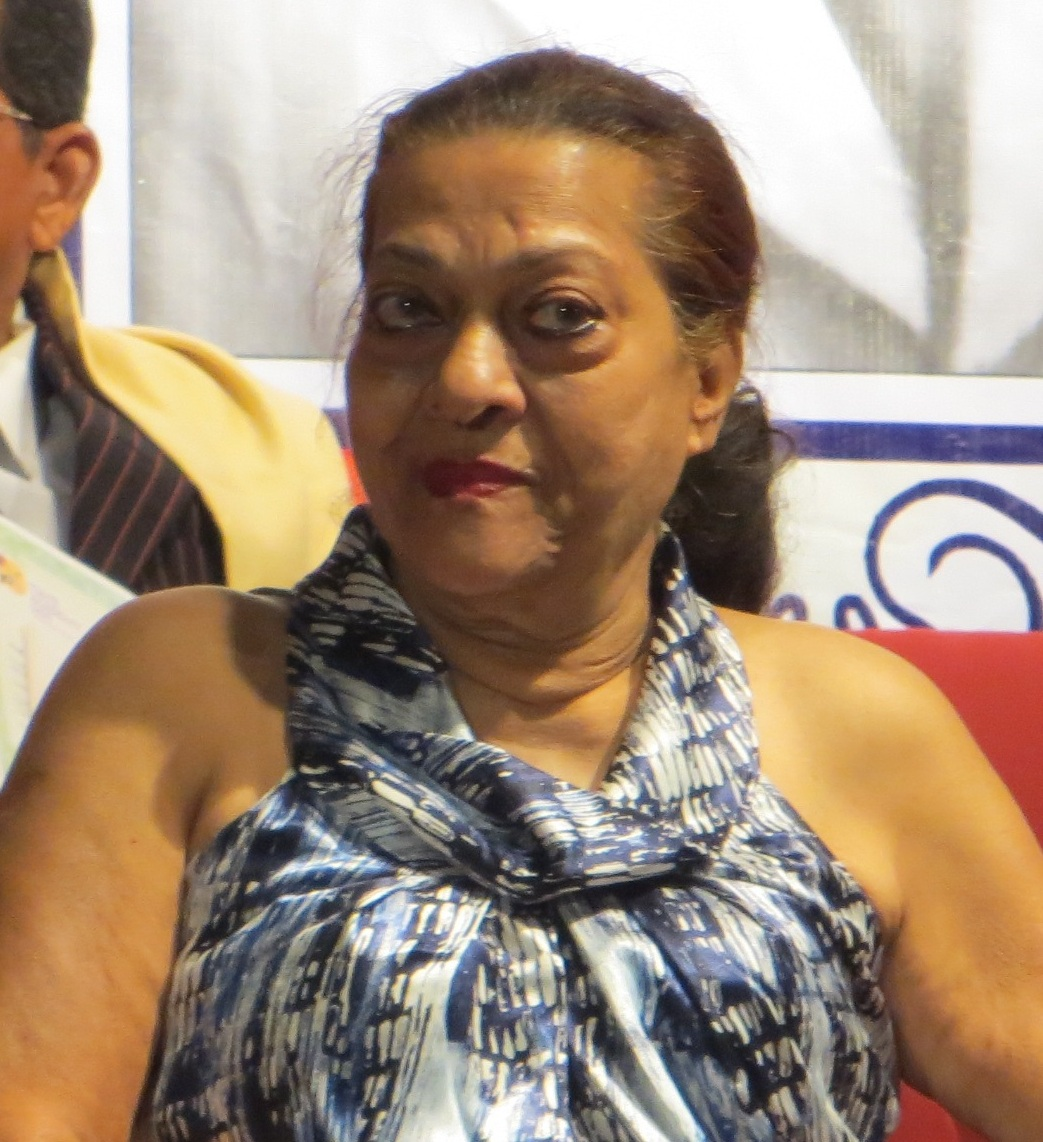
- Lobo at Ravindra Bhavan, Margao in 2013
- Born: Aldona, Goa, Portuguese India
- Died: 14 September 2024; Mumbai, Maharashtra, India
- Other name: Miss Carmen Rose
- Occupations: Singer; actress
- Years active: 1963–1978
- Relatives: Joe Rose (brother)
- Awards: TAG's "Lifetime Contribution to Tiatr Award" (2013)

Carmen Rose Lobo (née D'Souza; unknown – 14 September 2026) was an Indian singer and theatre actress known for her work in tiatr productions from 1963 to 1978.

== Career ==
Lobo's introduction to the Konkani stage came during the golden phase of tiatr, courtesy of C. Alvares. This period also witnessed the emergence of female artists, including Mohana Cabral, Shalini Mardolkar, Philomena Braz, Cecilia Machado, Antonette Mendes, Ophelia, Jessie Dias, and Betty Ferns. Lobo embarked on her theatrical journey in Bombay (now Mumbai) in 1963, debuting in a significant role in one of C. Alvares' tiatr productions. Her striking appearance and melodic voice left an impression on the audience. Subsequently, she caught the attention of Alfred Rose, who invited her to join his tiatr ensemble, adopting the stage name Carmen Rose.

Lobo's talents found expression in various tiatrs by playwrights such as J. P. Souzalin, Jacinto Vaz, M. Boyer, Prem Kumar, Remmie Colaço, and Robin Vaz. She portrayed the character of Mafaldina in Kid Boxer's tiatr Somzonnent Chuk Zali, a role later reprised by Selza Lopes in the 2017 production of the same name, recreated by Tomazinho Cardozo. In addition to acting, Lobo showcased her musical abilities by collaborating with different singers for duets, both on stage and through recordings on His Master's Voice. Her duet "Dotor Dotor Gunvoll leta" with Alfred Rose remains a beloved piece among radio listeners on All India Radio. Lobo also contributed her own compositions to All India Radio's programs. She then ventured into writing and producing her own tiatr, titled Maum vo Kumpar? However, after 15 years of service to the Konkani stage, she made the decision to retire. Family commitments and professional obligations compelled her to bid farewell to her stage career.

== Personal life ==
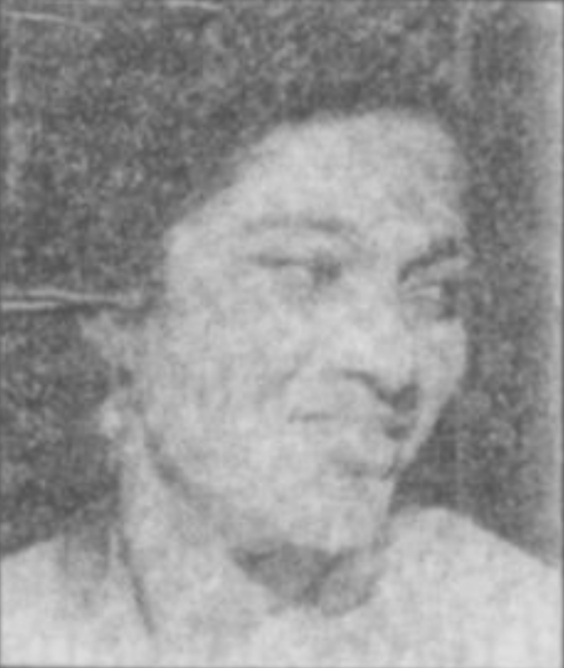
Lobo during her youth years

Lobo, originally named Carmen Rose D'Souza, hailed from Aldona, Bardez in Goa which was part of Portuguese India. As of 2000, she was reported to reside in Parel, Mumbai, along with her family. She entered into matrimony with a member of the Lobo family and subsequently adopted the Lobo surname, relinquishing her previous surname of D'Souza. Her brother Joe Rose, is also a Konkani actor and singer.

== Death ==
Lobo died on 14 September 2024 in Mumbai, Maharashtra.

== Awards ==
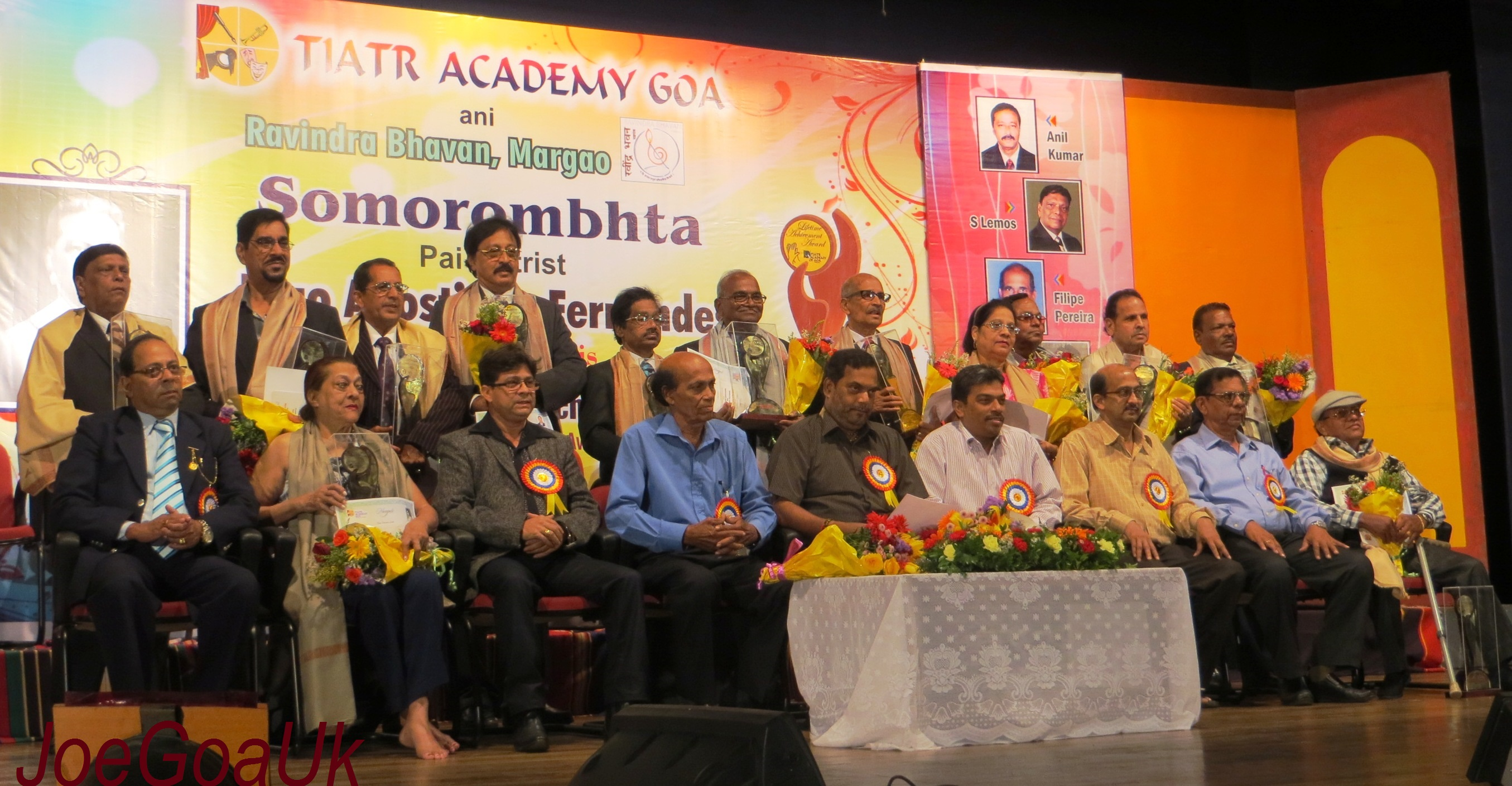
Lobo along with fellow tiatrists at the Ravindra Bhavan, Margao in 2013

In December 2013, Lobo received the "Lifetime Contribution to Tiatr Award" for her dedication to the promotion and growth of tiatr (Goan musical theatre), including its songs and music. This award was presented by the Tiatr Academy of Goa (TAG) in partnership with Ravindra Bhavan, Margao.

== Selected stage works ==
Year	Title	Role	Notes	Ref
1963	Untitled tiatr	Main role	Professional debut	
c. 1967	Somzonnent Chuk Zali	Mafaldina		
	Maum vo Kumpar?	Writer/producer		

== Select discography ==
- Dotor Dotor Gunvoll leta (feat. Alfred Rose)
