= Betty Ferns =

Indian actress and singer (born 1946)

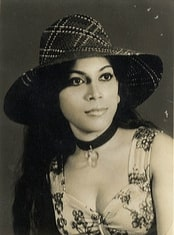
- Portrait of Fernandes during her youth
- Born: Maria Vital Fernandes; 4 November 1946 (age 79); Bombay, British India
- Citizenship: British subject (until 1947); India (from 1947)
- Occupations: Actress; singer
- Years active: 1968–2005
- Notable work: Bhuierantlo Munis
- Relatives: C. Alvares (brother-in-law); Prem Kumar (brother-in-law)

Maria Vital Fernandes (born 4 November 1946), known professionally as Betty Ferns, is an Indian actress and singer known for her work in Konkani films and tiatr productions.

== Early life ==
Maria Vital Fernandes, born on 4 November 1946, in Bombay, British India, was a resident of Morod, Sangolda in Bardez. Growing up in Bombay, Fernandes aimed to pursue a career in the film industry since childhood. She was affectionately known as Betty Ferns, christened by her godmother and maternal aunt, Beatrice D'Souza. Living in close proximity to a building on Claire Road, Fernandes encountered Anglo-Indian individuals who were involved in the Bollywood film industry. One day, while Fernandes was on her verandah, directors noticed her beauty and expressed their interest in her potential as an actress. However, her brother, Alfred, an artist, dissuaded the directors, fearing the potential challenges that could arise from his sister's pursuit of an acting career.

Fernandes has three sisters. The eldest, Antonette, married Tommy, the brother of Konkani actor and singer C. Alvares, and settled in Sangolda. The second sister, Ramona, married Konkani actor Prem Kumar and established her home in Bombay Central. Presently, Fernandes's third sister, Maxie, resides in Wadala. During a visit to Goa following Antonette's wedding, Fernandes discovered an opportunity to showcase her talents in a tiatr production titled Noxib Strikevaleachem. The tiatr, presented by prompter Anthony Fernandes, was performed in the village, providing Fernandes with a platform to display her acting abilities.

== Career ==
In his book, Konkani historian and singer Wilson Mazarello discusses the career of Fernandes, throughout her acting career, Fernandes has embodied a diverse array of characters. From portraying elderly women to embodying seductive vamps, heroic figures, devoted sisters, and dutiful daughters-in-law. However, it is her portrayal of female villains that stands out. Mazarello further writes, she has displayed skill and mastery in these negative roles, establishing them as her specialty. She has collaborated with playwrights such as C. Alvares, Prem Kumar, M. Boyer, Remmie Colaco, and Robin Vaz, showcasing her acting prowess in numerous productions. Not confined to national boundaries, Fernandes has also showcased her talent on international stages, including performances in Africa. In addition to her acting achievements, Fernandes is a singer, lending her voice to duets alongside artists like C. Alvares. Her musical collaborations have been recorded on platforms such as HMV Records. Beyond her performances, Fernandes has also demonstrated her creative prowess as a writer and director. She has penned and helmed a tiatr production that received acclaim, and was staged throughout Bombay (now Mumbai).

Upon her return to Bombay, Fernandes's godmother played a pivotal role in persuading her to embark on a career in tiatr. Initially dissuaded by her affectionate brother from pursuing acting in films and tiatrs, Fernandes ultimately found herself treading the boards. It was during the Bombay staging of C. Alvares's tiatr Bhorvanso (Hope) that Fernandes was recruited, subsequently becoming a part of numerous productions by Alvares, including the all-women show Khoincho Sakrament (Which Sacrament?). Her repertoire expanded to encompass other tiatrs such as Honrad Goenkar, Goencho Mog (The Love for Goa), Jurament (The Oath), Axea (The Greed), Mhozo Put Padri (My Son is a Priest), Hatantlim Kanknam (The Hand Bangles), Duddvankar Zatoloi (You'll become a Milkman), Sonvsar Sudhorlo Punn Munis Sudhronk Na, and many more. Fernandes made her debut on the Konkani stage in 1968, appearing in Anthony Fernandes's tiatr Noxib Strike Valeanchem. Over the next three decades, she graced the works of Konkani playwrights. Her final recorded stage appearance, as of January 2013, occurred in Samuel Carvalho's all-female production Bhogsonnem (The Forgiveness) in 2005.

In addition to her stage work, Fernandes also secured a supporting part in Chris Perry's Konkani film Bhuierantlo Munis and participated in the tiatr Novro Mhozo Devchar (My Devil Boyfriend). She frequently collaborated with playwright Prem Kumar, who crafted substantial roles for her in tiatrs such as Jivit Ek Sopon (Life's a Dream), which featured a distinctive character, and Rinn (The Debt), known for its revolving stage. Fernandes also showcased her comedic talents alongside M. Boyer in Kumar's tiatr Tum Modhem Poddonaka (You don't intervene). Her contributions extended to other productions including Tuje Dis Bhorle, No Time, Govai (The Witness), Dubhav (The Doubt), Vauraddi (The Worker), Dukh, Piso (Crazy), Hanv Kitem Korum? (What should I do?), Maria Magdalen (Mary Magdalene), and Abdul N D'Souza, among others.

In January 2014, during an interview with The Goan Everyday, Fernandes discussed her continued interest in acting in tiatrs, a form of Goan musical theatre. However, she mentioned the limited opportunities available in Mumbai and the lack of contact from playwrights, both in Mumbai and Goa. Despite these challenges, Fernandes expressed her eagerness to make a comeback to the tiatr stage if offered a role. Fernandes has had a notable association with M. Boyer, featuring in several of his tiatrs. She particularly praised her role in Mog, Kazar, Divors (Love, Marriage, Divorce) as one of the best experiences she had in Boyer's productions. Other tiatrs she participated in with Boyer include Bhurgem ani Bhangar (Child and Gold), Adim Tem Atam Hem, and Sounsar Sudhorlo, among others. Additionally, Fernandes had significant roles in tiatrs by Remmie Colaco, including Ghorachem Sukh Part I & II, and Mendes Brothers' production Bomboicho Dada (The Father of Bombay), where she portrayed a pickpocket. She also showcased her comedic talent alongside the Mendes Brothers in tiatrs such as Dharunn Vhoddil and Ghuttachi Battli (The Bottle of Secret). Fernandes had the opportunity to act in tiatrs staged by various directors, including Robin Vaz, Star of Arossim, Kid Boxer, Anthony Colaco, Jacint Vaz, Samuel Carvalho, Dominic Fernandes, Menino de Bandar, Rosario Rodrigues, and Rosario Dias.

In 1978, Fernandes wrote her own tiatr titled Maim Konnank Zai (Who needs a Mother?), which achieved success when it gained recognition after being performed at three separate locations in Bombay. The production received overwhelming response, surprising contractor Michael Correia. Fernandes also holds the distinction of being the first artist from Bombay to act in Rosario Rodrigues's khell tiatr, Ekech Ratri Ami Fator. Furthermore, she appeared in Bab Peter's tiatrs, including Maink Zai Punn Paik Naka (The Mother wants, but the Father doesn't) and Mijeas, as well as Rico Rod's tiatr, Zogzogta Tem Bhangar Nhoi, among others. Fernandes's involvement in the entertainment industry extended beyond tiatrs. She featured in the Konkani film Girestkai, produced by Ambika Films, and acted in Chris/Meena's tiatr, Anvddo (The Craving). As of July 2017, her most recent known appearance was in Dominic Fernandes's tiatr, Amchem Khoim Chukta, Sodhun Kadd. Although Fernandes expressed a greater inclination towards acting rather than singing, she has collaborated with various artists to render duets, including C. Alvares, Bab Peter, Prem Kumar, Young Mendes, H. Britton, Robin Vaz, Francis de Parra, and Joe Rose. She has also acted in Joe Rose's tiatrs, such as Ekuch Rogot (One Blood), Sun Nhoim Sunnem (Not Daughter-in-law, but a Dog), and Dev Konnacho, among others.

Fernandes is also known for her charismatic style and fashion coordination. Her stage presence allowed her to excel in various roles, often leaving her peers envious. Fernandes's theatrical journey began when C. Alvares' wife discovered her during a performance of the tiatr Strike Valeanchem Noxib. Impressed by her talent, Fernandes was recommended for a role in C. Alvares' subsequent production, Borvanso. This opportunity ignited a newfound sense of optimism within the young Fernandes. Upon witnessing her acting prowess in Borvanso, Alvares recognized her potential and pledged to support her. Advising her to embrace every opportunity, Alvares encouraged Fernandes to accept any role that came her way. Consequently, she went on to portray numerous characters in Alvares' productions as well as those by other prominent playwrights, often delivering duets alongside Alvares himself. Reflecting on her involvement in Mike Mehta's Grant Road, Fernandes recalls having only two scenes in the tiatr. However, her compelling performance garnered such conviction that audiences would visit her in the green room to congratulate her, occasionally causing unease among the main heroines.

As of July 2017, Fernandes remained actively engaged in stage performances, expressing her desire to continue showcasing her acting skills as the need arose. While participating in one of Jacinto Vaz's tiatrs, Fernandes faced harsh criticism from the audience for a role she portrayed, resulting in jeers and tears. However, the backstage encouragement of M. Boyer, Jacint Vaz, and Remmie Colaco provided reassurance to Fernandes, assuring her of the role's merit and dispelling her emotional distress. When members of the same audience later extended compliments in the green room, it served as a significant boost to Fernandes's confidence.

== Personal life ==
In the year 2000, Fernandes was not often appearing on stage because of her work obligations. She lives with her family in Byculla, Mumbai. As per the 2012 Directory of Tiatr Artistes, she is reported to reside in Nagpada, Mumbai.

== Filmography ==
Year	Title	Role	Notes	Ref
1977	Bhuierantlo Munis	Supporting role		
1980	Girestkai			

== Selected stage works ==
Year	Title	Role	Notes	Ref
1968	Noxib Strikevaleachem		Professional debut	
	Bhorvanso			
	Khoincho Sakrament		All-female show	
	Honrad Goenkar			
	Goencho Mog			
	Jurament			
	Axea			
	Mhozo Put Padri			
	Hatantlim Kanknam			
	Duddvankar Zatoloi			
	Sonvsar Sudhorlo Punn Munis Sudhronk Na			
1970s	Novro Mhozo Devchar			
1973	Jivit Ek Sopon	Male character		
	Rinn			
1990s	Tum Modhem Poddonaka	Comedian		
2005	Bhogsonnem		All-female show	
