= Robin Vaz =

Indian playwright and singer (1932–2002)

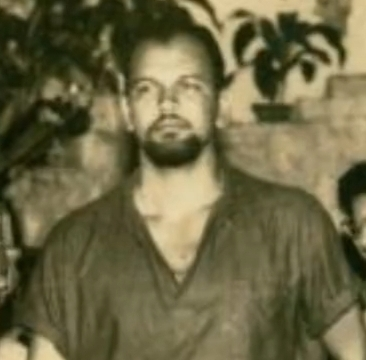
- Vaz during his youth
- Born: 20 October 1932; Cuncolim, Goa, Portuguese India, Portuguese Empire
- Died: 16 November 2002 (aged 70); Margao, Goa, India
- Occupations: Playwright; actor; singer; dancer
- Years active: 1941–1990s
- Organisation: Azad Gomantak Dal
- Notable work: Nirmon; Bhuierantlo Munis
- Movement: Goa liberation

Robin Vaz (20 October 1932 – 16 November 2002) was an Indian playwright, actor, singer, and dancer known for his work in Konkani films, tiatr productions, and Goan folk music.

== Career ==
Vaz made his debut on stage in João Agostinho Fernandes's tiatr (a form of theater in Goa) titled Kunbi Jakki. At the age of 11, Vaz seized an opportunity to act in a tiatr organized by his village peers, which showcased his early talent as a child artist. His performance left an impression on the audience, prompting many to recognize his potential as a tiatrist. Vaz's burgeoning reputation earned him invitations to act in tiatrs produced by established tiatrists such as Jephsis Hitler, Kamat de Assolna, and Saluzinho D'Costa. His involvement with these accomplished theatre practitioners further honed his skills and expanded his exposure within the Konkani theater community. At the age of 15, Vaz took the bold step of writing his own tiatr, titled Put Konnancho?, which he staged in Cuncolim. This production featured a mix of professional tiatrists and amateur actors and received a favorable response from audiences. Unfortunately, Vaz's aspirations were temporarily interrupted when he had to leave for Bombay (now Mumbai) in search of employment opportunities. During his time in Bombay, Vaz pursued avenues to establish himself professionally on the Konkani stage. He began showcasing his musical talents by singing songs on All India Radio, where his performances were regularly broadcast by All India Radio, Bombay. Meanwhile, Vaz actively participated in the movement for Goa's Liberation, collaborating with freedom fighters in their efforts to free Goa from Portuguese rule. Vaz's pro-nationalist stance led him to join the Azad Gomantak Dal (AGD), a political organization, where he worked closely with Mussolini Menezes, the secretary of AGD.

Menezes, who also wrote and staged tiatrs, played a significant role in Vaz's theatrical journey. Vaz had the opportunity to act and sing in several of Menezes's plays, including productions like Ravji Ranno, Padrichem Bondd, and Martyrs of Cuncolim. Through these collaborations, Vaz's talent and versatility were recognized by other directors in the Konkani theater scene, leading to a surge in offers for roles in tiatrs by popular directors such as J. P. Souzalin, Kid Boxer, Anthony D'Sa, Saib Rocha, A. R. Souza Ferrão, Alfred Rose, C. Alvares, and Jacinto Vaz, J. P. Souzalin, in particular, entrusted Vaz with significant roles in his religious plays, where Vaz demonstrated his ability to convincingly portray various Roman characters. This resulted in acclaim from audiences. As Vaz solidified his position on the stage, he began exploring his creative potential as a writer. He authored a total of 27 tiatrs throughout his career, with works including Ajente Monteiro, Shantichem Login (Peaceful Marriage), Opinion Poll, Dada, Barabas, Ghatki Salome, Biatin, Sam Juanv Batist, Saddam Hussain, and Put Konnancho. Among Vaz's repertoire, religious plays such as Adanv Ani Eva, Barabas, Dominic Savio, Don Bosco, Fatima Saibinn, Sam Juanv Baptist, and Ghatki Salomen stood out. These plays showcased Vaz's ability to engage and connect with audiences through thought-provoking narratives. His final tiatr was Miss Isabel.

One of Vaz's significant accomplishments was his self-penned tiatr titled Ajente Monteiro, which he wrote, directed, and staged shortly after Goa's liberation. In this production, Vaz portrayed the character of Agente Monteiro, a Portuguese officer known for his oppressive tactics, particularly against freedom fighters. Vaz's portrayal of this role was acclaimed for its skill and authenticity. Vaz also showcased his talent in a selection of Konkani films. His contributions include acting in Konkani movies such as Nirmon, Sukhachem Sopon, Kortubancho Sounsar, Mhoji Ghorkarn, and Bhuierantlo Munis. Vaz's versatility as an actor extended beyond regional cinema, as he had also made appearances in Hindi films, including Aap ki Izzat Aap Bachao and Asit Sinha, earning recognition for his performances on the silver screen. In addition to his achievements in film, Vaz made significant contributions to the traditional Goan musical theater form known as tiatr. He had an extensive repertoire of over 1000 performances, both in his own productions and collaborations with other tiatr artists. Vaz's musical talents are evident in his compositions and his performances as a singer. Among his most beloved songs are "Sitaram Gaddiwala," "Kunbi Vauraddi," "Backbay-chem Varem," "Pipirmitt," "Va-Re-Va," and "Darling Lucy." Vaz's influence extended to the realm of folk songs and dances, where he had made contributions. With his folklore troupe, Vaz has traveled extensively, introducing Goan folk songs to the tiatr stage. This endeavor not only expanded the repertoire of Konkani folk music but also garnered popularity among the local Goan population. Even today, Vaz's folk songs, including "Vavra Voitai," "Zatrek Vetam," and "Madly of Folk Songs," continue to resonate with audiences.

Furthermore, Vaz demonstrated a skill in creating Konkani songs specifically intended for stage performances. His compositions, including "Pipirmitt" and "Konkani Bhas", remain appreciated and are available through Gramophone Company India. His passion for folklore led him to host popular programs on folk songs at All India Radio in Bombay. To this day, his folk songs remain popular on All India Radio, reaching audiences in Goa and Mumbai. Vaz's talent as a folk singer and dancer became known, as he composed songs inspired by various Goan traditions, such as Kunbi, Kharvi, Xetkamti, Deknni, and Fugdi. Vaz's contributions to the arts have been recognized with many awards, spanning his tiatrs, songs, and folk dances. He had also released several audio cassettes, including Goa with Love and Unforgettable Hits. Throughout his career, Vaz had the opportunity to perform at prestigious events and functions across India. Despite dedicating over four decades to the Konkani stage, Vaz managed a successful career in a firm in Bombay. In the 1990s, he retired from his job to focus on completing unfinished projects. Alongside his professional endeavors, Vaz produced three of his own audio cassettes and featured in ten others. He has toured various cities, including Bombay, Goa, and Poona.

== Personal life ==
Robin Vaz was born on 20 October 1932, in Cuncolim, Goa, which was a part of Portuguese India during the time of the Portuguese Empire. His parents were Pedro Vaz and Valentina. Growing up in Cuncolim, Vaz was exposed to the vibrant songs and festivities of the Kunbi laborers who lived near his home. It was his mother, Valentina, who nurtured his passion for tiatr by taking him to local performances, including one by João Agostinho Fernandes, featuring A. R. Souza Ferrão, which left a lasting impression on young Vaz. Inspired by what he witnessed, Vaz began organizing his own mini concerts and children's tiatrs at home, using makeshift curtains made from bedsheets. His friends from the village joined him, assuming the roles of popular tiatrists of the time, such as J. P. Souzalin, A. R. Souza Ferrão, Anthony D'Sa, and Miss Julie. This early involvement in tiatr fueled Vaz's love for the art form, which continued to grow as he matured. Vaz went on to establish himself as a known figure in the world of Konkani tiatr, making contributions to its development. By 1995, he had settled with his family in Kalina, Santacruz, Bombay. On 16 November 2002, Vaz died in Margao, at the age of 70.

== Character assessment ==
Wilson Mazarello, a historian and singer specializing in Konkani culture, describes Vaz as an individual deeply connected to the world of music. Mazarello highlights how even the faintest sound of music would set Vaz's substantial frame in motion, as if his being resonated with the rhythms. This affinity with music was a defining characteristic of Vaz throughout his life, from his early years to his later stages. While the precise measurement of his height remains unknown, Vaz is widely acknowledged as the tallest and most imposing figure in the history of tiatr, a form of Goan musical theater. Moreover, Vaz possessed a unique charisma that captivated audiences, and his presence on stage, combined with his rhythmic dancing, infused the atmosphere with vibrant energy. Due to his physical stature, Vaz acquired the moniker "giant of the Konkani stage." Additionally, his comedic talents and humorous songs led some to compare him to the iconic comedy duo, "Laurel and Hardy." Wilson Mazarello characterizes Vaz as a highly amiable individual, a figure who left a lasting impression on those who knew him.

== Selected stage works ==
Year	Title	Role	Notes	Ref
1941	Kunbi Jakki	Unnamed role		
c. 1943	Untitled tiatr	Child artist		
c. 1947	Put Konnancho?	Writer		
	Ravji Ranno	Actor/singer		
	Padrichem Bondd	Actor/singer		
	Martyrs of Cuncolim	Actor/singer		
1960s	Ajente Monteiro	Writer		
	Shantichem Login	Writer		
1960s	Opinion Poll	Writer		

== Select discography ==
=== Singles ===
- Kunbi Vauraddi (1965)
- Sitaram Gaddiwalla (1966)
- Darling Lucy (1977)
- Pipirmitt (1981)
- Vare-Va (1981)
- Backbaychem Varem (1981)
