= Shalini Mardolkar =

Indian actress and singer (1939–2013)

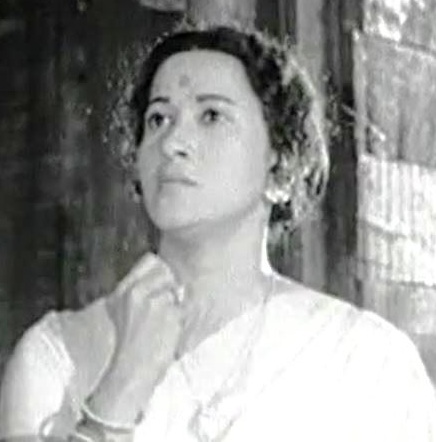
- Mardolkar as Sharda in Taqdeer (1967)
- Born: 15 August 1939; Mardol, Goa, Portuguese India
- Died: 7 January 2013 (aged 73); Vasai, Vasai-Virar, Maharashtra, India
- Occupations: Actress; singer; playwright; director
- Years active: 1949–1990s
- Known for: Nirmon (1966)
- Spouse: A. Salaam
- Awards: TAG's "Lifetime Contribution to Tiatr Award" (2009)

Shalini Mardolkar (15 August 1939 – 7 January 2013) was an Indian actress, singer, playwright, and director known for her work in Hindi, Konkani films, and tiatr productions. In the Konkani theatre scene, she is best known for her portrayal of Mother Mary in J. P. Souzalin's tiatr Saibinnicheo Sat Dukhi.

== Early life ==
Shalini Mardolkar was born on 15 August 1939 in Mardol, Goa which was part of Portuguese India during the Portuguese Empire (now in India). From a young age, she showed a strong inclination towards acting.

== Career ==
Mardolkar began her artistic journey through Marathi and Gujarati dramas during her formative years. Through her participation in these productions, directed by seasoned artists, she cultivated an understanding of the art of acting. At a young age, Mardolkar established the Shalini Songit Mandal group and showcased her talents as a child artist. Her initial foray into Marathi drama at the age of 5 was followed by endeavors in the Gujarati theater scene. As Mardolkar matured, her acting prowess reached new heights, and she gained acclaim in the realm of Marathi dramas in Bombay. Her skills extended to the Gujarati theater, where she made contributions. It was in 1949, at the age of approximately 10, that she made her debut on the Konkani stage in Anthony Franklin Coelho's tiatr titled Bhau-Bhoinn (Brother-Sister). Despite her youth, Mardolkar demonstrated talent, holding her own alongside seasoned professionals. In this production, she portrayed a lead role opposite C. Alvares, who was around 29 years old at the time. Mardolkar's performance was further enriched by her duet with Anthony Mendes. Her maiden appearance left an impression on tiatr enthusiasts, thereby securing her a position in the tiatr field. It was C. Alvares who reintroduced Mardolkar to Konkani tiatrs through his own production, Vojem (Burden). This marked the beginning of her popularity among tiatr audiences, who eagerly anticipated her performances. Consequently, Mardolkar became a regular presence in tiatrs directed by tiatrists such as J. P. Souzalin, Jacinto Vaz, Anthony D'Sa, Robin Vaz, Prem Kumar, M. Boyer, Alfred Rose, and others. Her versatility as an actress, coupled with her ability to portray diverse roles across a range of tiatrs, solidified her as one of the popular tiatr artists of her time.

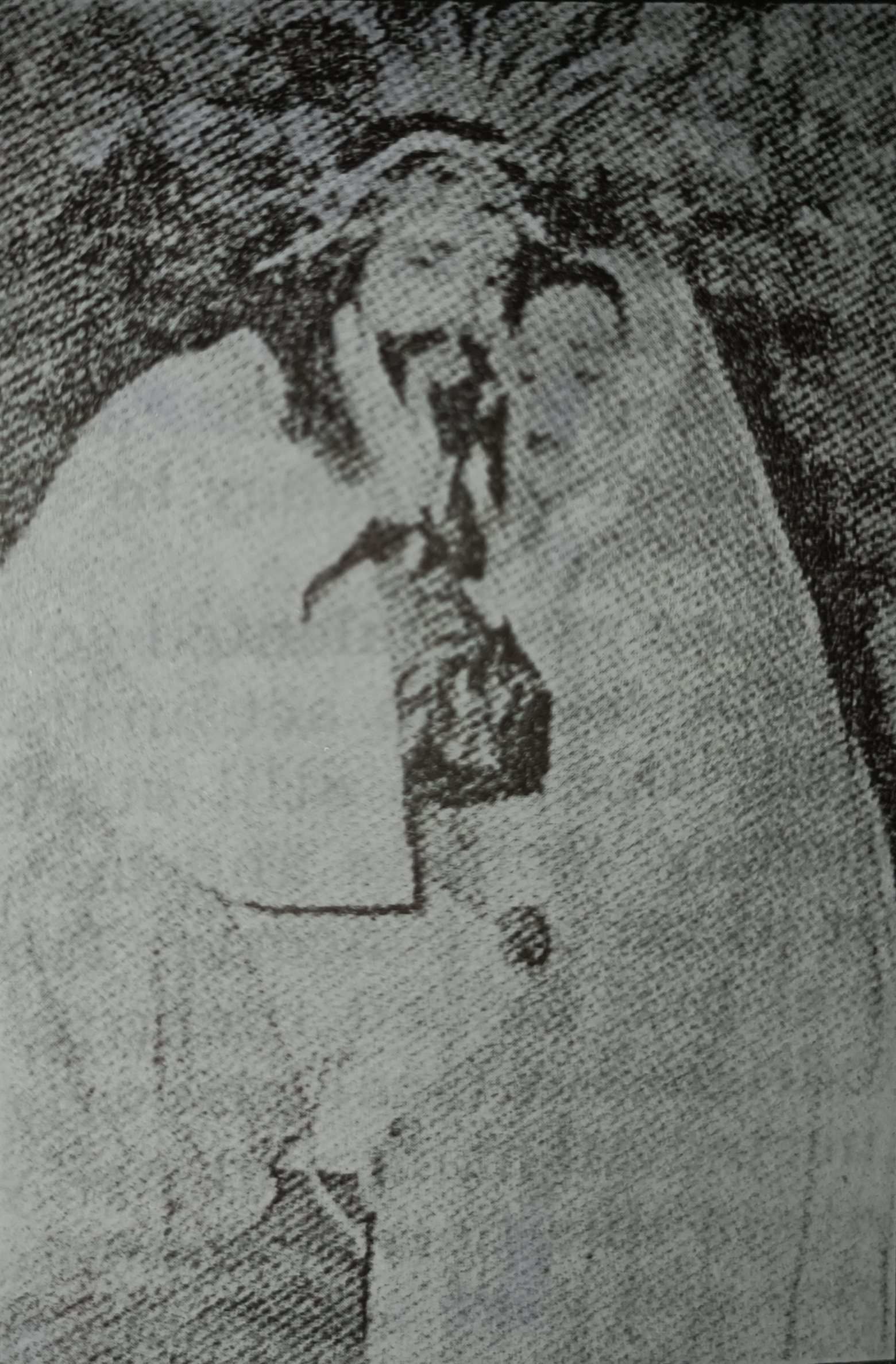
Mardolkar as Mother Mary (right) in J. P. Souzalin's Saibinnicheo Sat Dukhi

Mardolkar's artistic contributions extended beyond the confines of her religious convictions. During the Lenten season, religious dramas were traditionally staged in both Goa and Bombay. A highlight in her career was her portrayal of Mother Mary in J. P. Souzalin's religious tiatr (theater performance) titled Saibinnicheo Sat Dukhi (Our Lady's Seven Dolours), which took place in Mapuçá, Goa in 1963. Mardolkar's depiction of Mother Mary garnered critical acclaim and earned her recognition within the tiatr community. Her performance resonated with the audience, particularly during the crucifixion scene, evoking an emotional response as spectators were moved to tears. The impact of her acting was so significant that after the conclusion of the tiatr, people eagerly sought Mardolkar's blessings, regarding her as a representation of Mother Mary. The audience bestowed the title "Dukhant Bhorloli Saibinn Maim" (The Grieving Mother Mary) upon her in recognition of her performance in the tiatr. Her portrayal in Saibinnicheo Sat Dukhi was regarded as the most memorable role of her career, as she herself expressed in previous interviews. In addition to her acting prowess, Mardolkar possessed a singing talent. She frequently collaborated with artists such as Anthony Mendes, M. Boyer, Master Vaz, Jacinto Vaz, C. Alvares, and Robin Vaz, delivering duets, trios, and quartets. As her career progressed, Mardolkar had the privilege of working with directors including Jacinto Vaz, Robin Vaz, Prem Kumar, M. Boyer, Anthony D'Sa, and Alfred Rose. She showcased her comedic abilities in various tiatrs, often sharing the stage with Anthony Mendes. Mardolkar's voice left a mark on Goan culture, resonating in households across the region. Her rendition of the popular lullaby/song "Dhol Mojea Bai" (Rock my baby) in Frank Fernand's film Nirmon (1966) solidified her status as a singer and actress. The song, specifically composed for Mardolkar, continues to be played on HMV Records and audio tapes.

Mardolkar's filmography includes performances in several Konkani films. Among her popular works are the films Nirmon and Mhoji Ghorkarn (1969), both directed by her husband, Hindi film director A. Salaam. Mardolkar's portrayal of lead characters in these films, opposite actors such as C. Alvares and Jacinto Vaz, captivated audiences and received recognition from film authorities for their quality. Mardolkar's acting credits also include a role in the film Amchem Noxib (1963). The movie Nirmon was subsequently remade in Hindi as Taqdeer (1967), with Mardolkar reprising the main role once more. Her artistic journey also encompasses the realm of video films, where she lent her talents to Mogachi Faxi, a Konkani production produced and directed by C. Alvares. Beyond her on-screen appearances, she ventured into the realms of writing and directing, creating two tiatrs (Konkani theater productions) titled Sounsaracho Gaddo (The bullock cart of the world) and Korta To Bhogta (One who acts has to pay). The former gained popularity with performances staged throughout Goa during the mid-1990s. As of 1995, remaining an active participant in the Konkani stage, Mardolkar's presence was frequently seen at tiatrs by playwrights in Goa. In addition to her acting and directing endeavors, Mardolkar has performed vocals for over 50 musical compositions. She also had over 500 tiatr performances to her credit, both in her own productions and collaborations with others.

== Personal life ==
Mardolkar married Hindi film director A. Salaam, who lived in Bombay. In 1995, Mardolkar was living with her family in Khar, Bombay. According to an anecdote from 1980 by Konkani actor Premanand Sangodkar, Mardolkar and her husband had a bungalow in Bandra, Bombay at that time.

== Awards ==
Mardolkar was honored with the "best actress award" for her performance in the Konkani film Nirmon (1966) by the Prime Minister of India, Indira Gandhi, at the State Awards for Films. Additionally, she was recognized with the "Lifetime Contribution to Tiatr Award" by the Tiatr Academy of Goa (TAG) in 2009. Mardolkar's contributions to Konkani tiatr were also acknowledged during the centenary celebrations of the art form in 1992 by the Kala Academy Goa.

== Death ==
Mardolkar's declining health, attributed to her advanced age, culminated in her death on 7 January 2013, at her home in Vasai, Maharashtra, India, at the age of 73.

=== Reactions ===
Tiatr critic and journalist Daniel F De Souza expressed deep regret at the death of Mardolkar, highlighting her significant influence on the stage from the 1950s to the 1980s. Despite her absence from the stage for a period, her impact, particularly as a role model for future generations, cannot be overlooked, writes De Souza. Noting her performance in M. Boyer's tiatr Ekuch Rosto (Only One Way), De Souza emphasizes Mardolkar's portrayal of a traditional Hindu woman as her most memorable stage achievement. Tomazinho Cardozo, the president of Kala Mogi, Candolim, expressed his condolences, emphasizing the loss suffered by the tiatr community and the Konkani language due to Mardolkar's death. Her talent made a significant impact on the development of Konkani tiatr, writes Cardozo.

On 9 January 2013, the chairman of Kala Academy, Vishnu Wagh, mourned the death of Mardolkar, expressing sorrow over the loss. He praised Mardolkar as a versatile actress whose impact on the Konkani tiatr stage will be cherished by enthusiasts of the arts for a long time. Wagh emphasized that her absence has left a void in the Goan Konkani tiatr stage, highlighting that Mardolkar's contributions will always be held in high regard by the art community in Goa. The Tiatr Academy of Goa (TAG) released a statement highlighting Mardolkar's versatility as an actress and her ability to captivate audiences with her performances. Recognizing her contributions to the tiatr stage, Mardolkar received the "Tiatr Academy's Lifetime Contribution to Tiatr Award" in 2009. TAG, on behalf of the tiatr fraternity and enthusiasts, expressed condolences to her grieving family.
