= Ophelia Cabral =

Indian actress and singer (1938–2016)

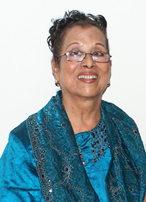
- Cabral at Institute Menezes Braganza, 2013
- Born: Clara Merciana Ophelia Cabral; 8 November 1938; Socorro, Goa, Portuguese India
- Died: 19 February 2016 (aged 77); Mumbai, Maharashtra, India
- Burial place: Church Of Our Lady Of Victories cemetery, Mahim, Mumbai, Maharashtra, India
- Other names: Miss Ophelia; Ophelia Cabral D'Souza
- Occupations: Actress; singer; playwright; director
- Years active: 1954–1998
- Notable work: Amchem Noxib; Nirmon; Bhuierantlo Munis
- Spouse: Bab Peter (m. 1976; died 2005)
- Children: 1
- Relatives: Mohana Cabral (sister)
- Awards: TAG's "Lifetime Contribution to Tiatr Award" (2009); TSKK's "Antonio Pereira Konknni Puroskar" (2011)
- Website: babpeterophelia.com Archived 2021-07-29 at the Wayback Machine

Ophelia Cabral e D'Souza (born Clara Merciana Ophelia Cabral; 8 November 1938 – 19 February 2016), popularly known as Ophelia Cabral, was an Indian actress, singer, playwright, and director known for her work in Konkani films and tiatr productions. One of the multifaceted performers of her time, she is referred to as the "Tragedy Queen of the Konkani stage" and was known for her roles in Konkani films such as Amchem Noxib, Nirmon, Boglantt, Bhuierantlo Munis, and Faxi Mogachi.

== Early life ==
Ophelia Cabral e D'Souza was born as Clara Merciana Ophelia Cabral on 8 November 1938, in the village of Socorro, Goa, which was part of Portuguese India during the Portuguese Empire (now in India). She was the daughter of Gaulbert and Leena Cabral, and had three siblings: Eddie, Tony, and an elder sister Mohana, known professionally as Miss Mohana, who gained prominence as a Konkani actress and singer. Cabral spent a significant portion of her life and pursued her career in Bombay (now Mumbai).

== Career ==
Cabral made her acting debut in 1954 in the tiatr production titled Opurbayechi Sun, which was produced by A. F. Rod. Her portrayal of a daughter-in-law with negative traits garnered favorable reception from both the audience and her peers in the tiatr community. She further gained recognition as an actress for her performance in the tiatr production Avoicho Xirap (Mother's Curse), written and directed by C. Alvares. From then on, Cabral delivered performances in numerous tiatrs, that showcased her versatility and maturity in portraying various roles.

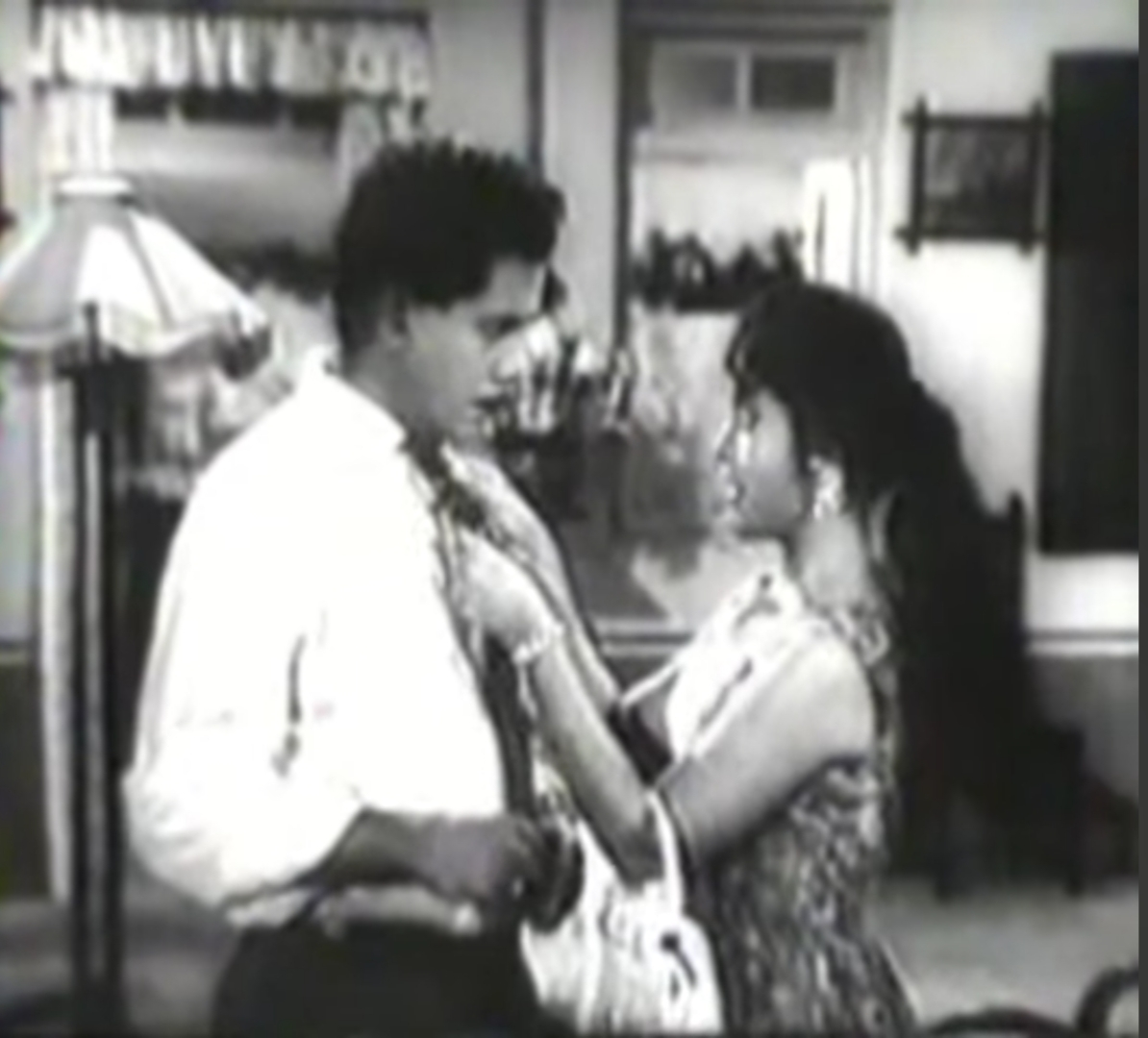
A still from the Konkani film Amchem Noxib, ft. C. Alvares and Cabral.

Throughout her career, Cabral had the opportunity to collaborate with tiatr industry figures, including Master Vaz, Dr. Simon C. Fernandes, C. Alvares, J. P. Souzalin, and M. Boyer. In addition to her acting accomplishments, Cabral ventured into writing and directing her own tiatrs, including productions such as Mhojim Bhurgim (My Children) and Bailanchi Sobai (Woman's Beauty). She also partnered with her husband to produce and direct eight tiatrs, which received acclaim from the general public.

Beyond acting, Cabral was known for her singing abilities. Her artistic contributions were not limited to the regions of Goa and Bombay (now Mumbai), as she also performed in international venues in Bahrain, Muscat, Dubai, and Beirut. Cabral had a presence in the Konkani theater for a span of 44 years, beginning her career at the age of 16 under the guidance of A. F. Rod. She was known for her portrayal of tragic roles. Alongside tiatr performers like C. Alvares, M. Boyer, Prem Kumar, and her own spouse, Cabral also showcased her singing abilities, lending her voice to several audio cassettes.

Cabral had been actively involved in the production of various Konkani video films. She also played a role in the creation of the first Konkani video film, Faxi Mogachi, under the production of C. Alvares. Furthermore, she has contributed to the development of other video films such as Tuka Kitem Podlam and Natalancho Kusvar. She has also written and directed her own theatrical productions, including Mhoji Bhurgim and Bailanchi Sobai. Apart from her independent projects, she has also supported her husband, Bab Peter, in directing a total of 18 tiatrs.

== Personal life ==
Cabral married Peter D'Souza, known professionally as Bab Peter, a noted Konkani actor and singer who was 13 years her junior, on 22 May 1976. The couple had one daughter, Tatum D'Souza (b. 1977), known professionally as Babli, and is a singer. She is married to Sameer Ganapathy and they have one daughter, Nia. According to the 2012 Directory of Tiatr Artistes, Cabral resided in Mahim, Mumbai. On 19 February 2005, Cabral's husband died after suffering a heart attack at the Bahrain Defence Force Hospital in Bahrain.

== Awards ==
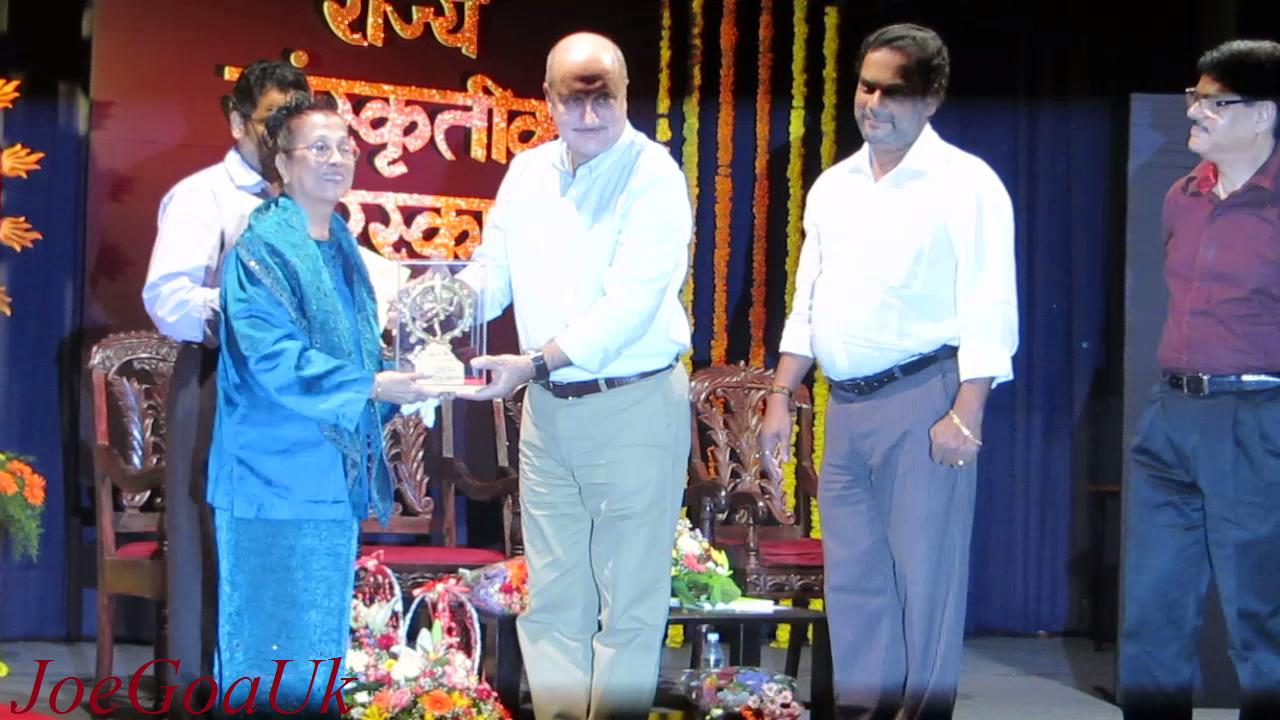
Cabral receives the Goa State Cultural Award from Bollywood actor and director Anupam Kher in 2013.

In 2009, Cabral was honored with the "Lifetime Contribution to Tiatr Award" by the Tiatr Academy of Goa. Recognizing her contributions to literature, she also received the "Goa State Cultural Award" for the years 2010–11. In January 2011, Cabral was bestowed with the "Antonio Pereira Konknni Puroskar" (APKP) by the Thomas Stephens Konknni Kendr (TSKK) for her extensive contributions to Konkani tiatr and films.

== Death ==
On 19 February 2016, Cabral died in Mumbai, Maharashtra, India. Her death occurred on the 11th death anniversary of her husband Bab Peter. The funeral service took place the following day at Victoria Church in Mahim, Mumbai. The Tiatr Academy of Goa (TAG), representing the tiatr community and enthusiasts, expressed their condolences to the mourning family of Cabral.

== Select filmography ==
Year	Title	Role	Notes	Ref
1963	Amchem Noxib	Emma		
1966	Nirmon	Fiona		
1975	Boglantt			
1977	Bhuierantlo Munis	Receptionist		

=== Video films ===
Year	Title	Role	Notes	Ref
1990	Faxi Mogachi			
1995	Tuka Kiteak Podlam			
	Natalancho Kusvar			

== Selected stage works ==
Year	Title	Role	Notes	Ref
1954	Opurbayechi Sun	Wicked daughter-in-law	Debut tiatr	
	Avoicho Xirap	Unnamed		
	Mhojim Bhurgim	Writer/director		
	Bailanchi Sobai	Writer/director		
