= Wilson Mazarello =

Indian singer and writer (born 1946)

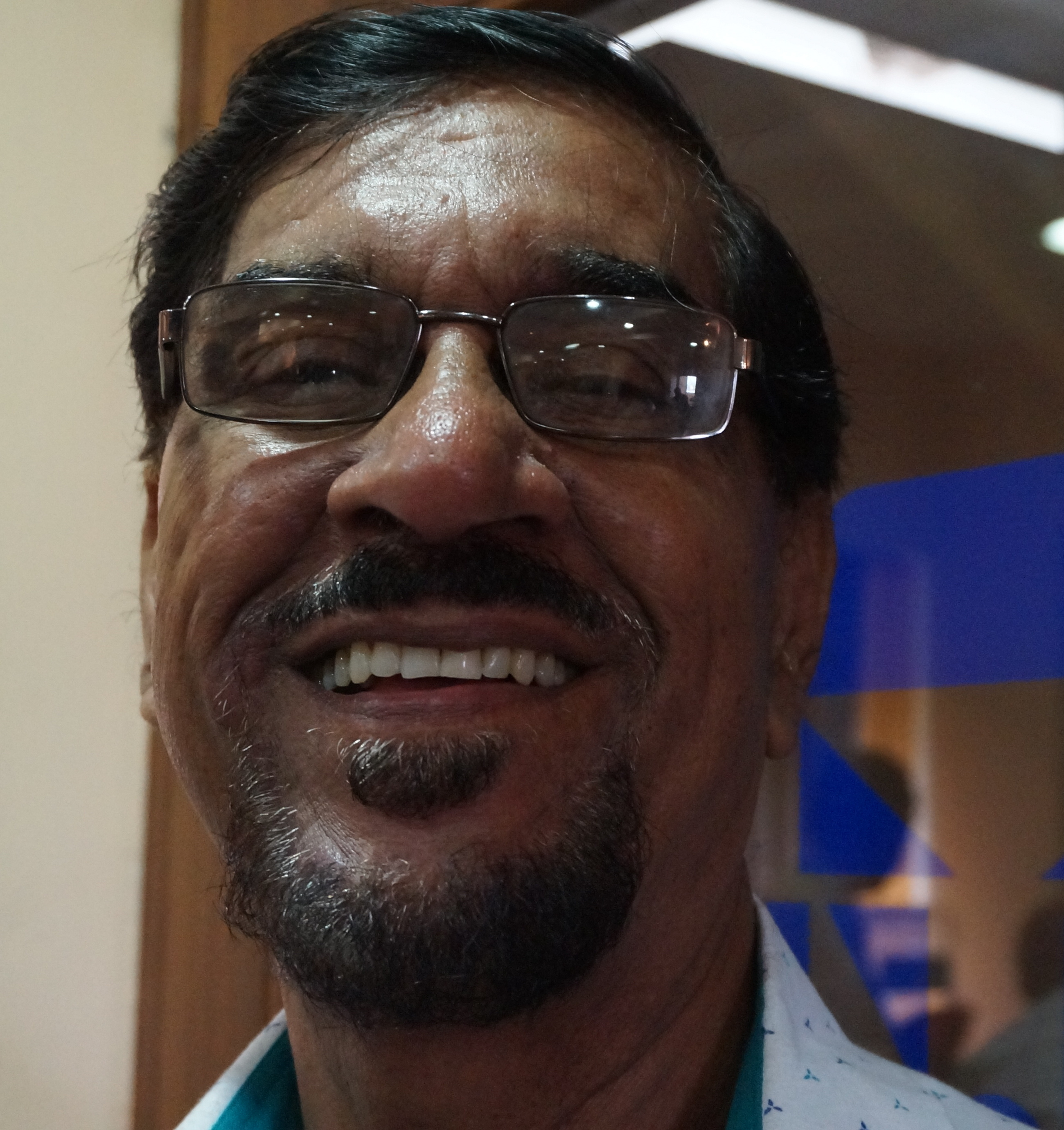
- Mazarello in 2016
- Born: Wilson Constantino Vicente Mazarelo; 19 July 1946 (age 80); Velim, Goa, Portuguese India, Portuguese Empire (now in India)
- Other name: Wilmix
- Education: St. Xavier's College
- Occupations: Singer; writer; playwright; politician; historian; producer
- Years active: 1970–present
- Political party: Independent (since 2017)
- Other political affiliations: Goa Su-Raj Party (till 2017)
- Spouse: Sharon Mazarello
- Website: www.fromgoawithlove.com

Wilson Vincent Mazarello (born Wilson Constantino Vicente Mazarelo; 19 July 1946), also known as Wilmix, is an Indian singer, writer, playwright, and politician known for his work in Konkani films, and tiatr productions.

== Early life ==
Mazarello received his early education in Portuguese (Pimeiro - Gravo) at Velim before moving to Bombay to continue his studies in English. From an early age, Mazarello displayed a keen interest in singing. He would save his money to attend tiatr performances, a popular form of theatre in Goa. Although his parents also participated in local shows, they were determined for their son to receive a good education and pursue a successful career.

Despite their wishes, Mazarello continued to nurture his passion for tiatr by contributing through songwriting, but he did not actively pursue acting in these productions. After completing a bachelor's degree in science from Bombay University, he embarked on a career in Bombay. Mazarello furthered his education by studying Business Management & International Marketing, eventually rising through the ranks to become an export manager in a pharmaceutical company. This position afforded him the opportunity to travel extensively to various countries in Europe, Africa, and Asia for business purposes. During his time at St. Xavier's College, Mazarello served as the president of the Konkani Mandal for two years. One of his achievements during his tenure was the establishment of a library dedicated to Konkani literature at the college. Mazarello held great admiration for the Konkani actor A. R. Souza Ferrao, and it was during his family's relocation to Bombay that he had the chance to closely observe and appreciate the intricacies of the Konkani stage.

== Career ==
Mazarello is the owner of Rhythm House music shop in Margao, Mazarello has fostered connections with tiatrists such as M. Boyer, Chris Perry, Alfred Rose, and C. Alvares, commemorating their presence through life-size cut-outs displayed at his establishment. Marcus Mergulhao, from The Times of India, hails Mazarello as a distinctive and atypical tiatrist with a unique command over words.

Mazarello is known for his significant contribution to the preservation of Konkani tiatr by publishing a comprehensive book titled 100 Years of the Konkani Tiatro in 2000. This meticulously crafted 406-page volume serves as a definitive resource, chronicling the rich history of Goan tiatr. It contains printed versions of tiatr handbills dating back to the 1800s, complemented by photographs of renowned tiatrists, important historical dates, significant landmarks, and valuable information about the pioneers and contributors who have shaped tiatr culture. Mazarello's accomplishments extend beyond the literary realm. Alongside his wife Sharon Mazarello, he achieved international recognition by securing a place in The Guinness Book of World Records. Their feat involved participating in the longest non-stop singing marathon of choral groups, known as Konkani Nirontari, held at the prestigious Kala Angan in Mangalore. Their performance lasted an astounding 49 hours, surpassing a previous record held by a Brazilian group. The authenticity of their achievement was duly verified by Guinness officials.

Not only has Mazarello made contributions to the literary and performance aspects of tiatr, but he has also ventured into the realm of children's literature. He published a book of Konkani stories designed for young readers, evoking a sense of nostalgia akin to the tales passed down by grandparents. Additionally, as of 2013, Mazarello was engaged in writing his autobiography, a project that, if had completed within 2014, would have had mark a pioneering endeavor as the first tiatrist to chronicle his own life story. Mazarello's artistic prowess extends to the stage, where he has excelled as a performer. He is widely known as Wilmix, the founder of the popular Wilmix trio. During the 1980s, this trio played a pivotal role in reviving the trio-culture.

=== WILMIX trio (1980s–1990) ===
Mazarello and his wife Sharon have established themselves as highly sought-after duet performers in the Konkani music industry. Mazarello's journey as a performer began after completing his college education, when he developed a strong aspiration to showcase his singing abilities on stage. Recognizing his talent, Mazarello sought a platform to launch his career but encountered challenges due to his limited industry connections. During this time, Mazarello's primary contact was Fr Avertano Nazareth, a priest associated with Dabul church, who had connections with Frank Fernand, a Konkani music composer known for his work in movies such as Amchem Noxib and Nirmonn. Mazarello, due to professional obligations and personal commitments, was unable to actively participate in stage performances. Nonetheless, he maintained a keen interest in dramas and diligently followed the Konkani weeklies, which served as a platform for advertisements and news related to tiatr, a popular form of Goan musical theater. It was during this time that Mazarello encountered an advertisement for a musical show called Bekar Patrao, composed by Frank Fernand.

Intrigued by the opportunity, Mazarello sought out Rico Rod, the individual responsible for overseeing the artists and skits involved in the production. With the guidance of Fr. Avertano Nazareth, Mazarello, who was also studying solfeggio, was introduced to Aniceto Fernandes, the publisher of a prominent Konkani weekly. Through these connections, Mazarello managed to establish contact with Rico Rod, who agreed to include him in a trio performance, provided that Mazarello arranged his own singers. Despite the challenges involved, Mazarello persevered and successfully enlisted two of his friends as fellow vocalists. The trio's performance garnered resounding applause, prompting one influential musician to express the sentiment that the Konkani stage would benefit from the addition of more such talented individuals. The show itself was presented in seven different locations, further extending their reach.

Despite his lack of personal acquaintances in the singing community, Mazarello persisted in his search and successfully formed a trio comprising Xavier and Michael. All three members were talented but relatively inexperienced amateurs. Before they could perform on stage, they underwent auditions where they had to impress the director with their skills. The trio rehearsed at local venues called the Kudds (Goan clubs), utilizing trunks as a makeshift stage and utilizing fellow members as an audience. Through consistent practice, their confidence steadily grew. During the audition, the trio delivered a memorable performance. Despite their amateur status, their voices, synchronized movements, and compelling body language left an impression on the senior tiatrists who were present. Frank Fernandes, overseeing the auditions, was particularly enthused by their talent. When the trio finally made their stage debut, they received an overwhelmingly positive response from the audience, resulting in three additional encores. Mazarello's talent and dedication caught the attention of C. Alvares, a Konkani actor and singer in the tiatr industry. Interestingly, Mazarello's introduction to Alvares was facilitated by his not-so-friendly neighbor in Pali Hill, Bandra. Alvares recognized Mazarello's potential and became his mentor, providing invaluable guidance and insights into the art of acting.

Subsequently, Mazarello's path crossed with that of Prem Kumar, a showman who happened to be searching for a trio to feature in the tiatr production titled Upkar Naslolo. Seizing the opportunity, the trio rendered two songs in the show. Regrettably, due to their work commitments, they were unable to participate in the subsequent Goa tour. However, four years later, they seized the chance to perform in Goa and captivated the audience with their trio performances on social issues, incorporating both serious and humorous elements. This marked a turning point in their careers, propelling them to collaborate with other esteemed directors such as C. Alvares, Robin Vaz, Alfred Rose, and A. R. Souza Ferrao. Notably, when Mazarello unveiled his own drama, Tiatrist, Souza Ferrao had the distinct honor of acting in the production-an experience he described as a tremendous privilege.

=== Trio disbandment; further growth ===
Mazarello embarked on a new artistic endeavor after the dissolution of the successful Wilmix trio. Teaming up with his wife, Sharon, whose talent he had recognized and admired, Mazarello expanded his creative horizons both on and off the stage. With an extensive body of work, he produced 27 audio albums, authored over 40 plays, and composed a myriad of songs for tiatr performances, collaborating with established and emerging tiatrists alike. Mazarello's musical compositions garnered acclaim, with several of his songs reaching the top of the Akashwani Radio charts in Goa and Mumbai. Pieces such as 'CID Maim, 'Sousarant Dev Aila, 'Absent Minded Professor,' 'Chint Munxya, 'Moddgonvam Prasar' (in collaboration with Sharon), and 'Pavsacho Dis' have endured the test of time. Mazarello's musical influence extended beyond local boundaries, as his songs resonated with audiences in Brazil through Radio Brazil broadcasts, while Radio Ceylon also aired his compositions. Over the course of his four-decade-long career, Mazarello amassed a record of approximately 3,500 theater performances.

In September 2013, Mazarello joined the cast of Sao Gonsalo Dramatic Troupe's production Tuka Kitem Meulem' (What did you get?) and Tomazinho Cardozo's Hello Uncle. The following month, he participated in Anil Pednekar's tiatr Xik'ko. Additionally, Mazarello gained recognition for his thought-provoking self-penned tiatrs, including Sukthi- Bhorti (The ebb and the tide) and Durig (Wall). Despite the disbandment of Wilmix in 1990, the group's legacy endured, with Mazarello, as the leader, being affectionately referred to as Wilmix by Konkani stage enthusiasts. Out of respect for the group's enduring popularity and the deep connection to the name, Mazarello opted to retain the name, feeling a sense of responsibility to uphold its legacy and ensure its continued recognition.

== Selected stage works ==
Year	Title	Role	Notes	Ref
1980s	Upkar Naslolo	Singer	As WILMIX trio	
	Tiatrist	Director		
2013	Tuka Kitem Meulem	Mr. Ferrao		
2013	Hello Uncle	Singer		
2013	Xik'ko	Singer & actor		

== Bibliography ==
- Mazarello, Wilmix Wilson (1993). Sukti-Bhorti. Volvoi, Goa, India: Apurbai Prakashan.
- Mazarello, Wilmix Wilson (2000). Durig. Navelim, Goa, India: Shri Hari Prakashana.
- Mazarello, Wilmix Wilson (2000). 100 Years of Konkani Tiatro. Panaji, Goa, India: Directorate of Art & Culture, Government of Goa. OCLC 71174491.
- Mazarello, Wilmix Wilson (2018). Edward D'Lima (ed.). Konkani Khell Tiatr. Panaji, Goa, India: Dalgado Konknni Akademi.
