= Mohana Cabral =

Indian actress and singer (1929–1990)

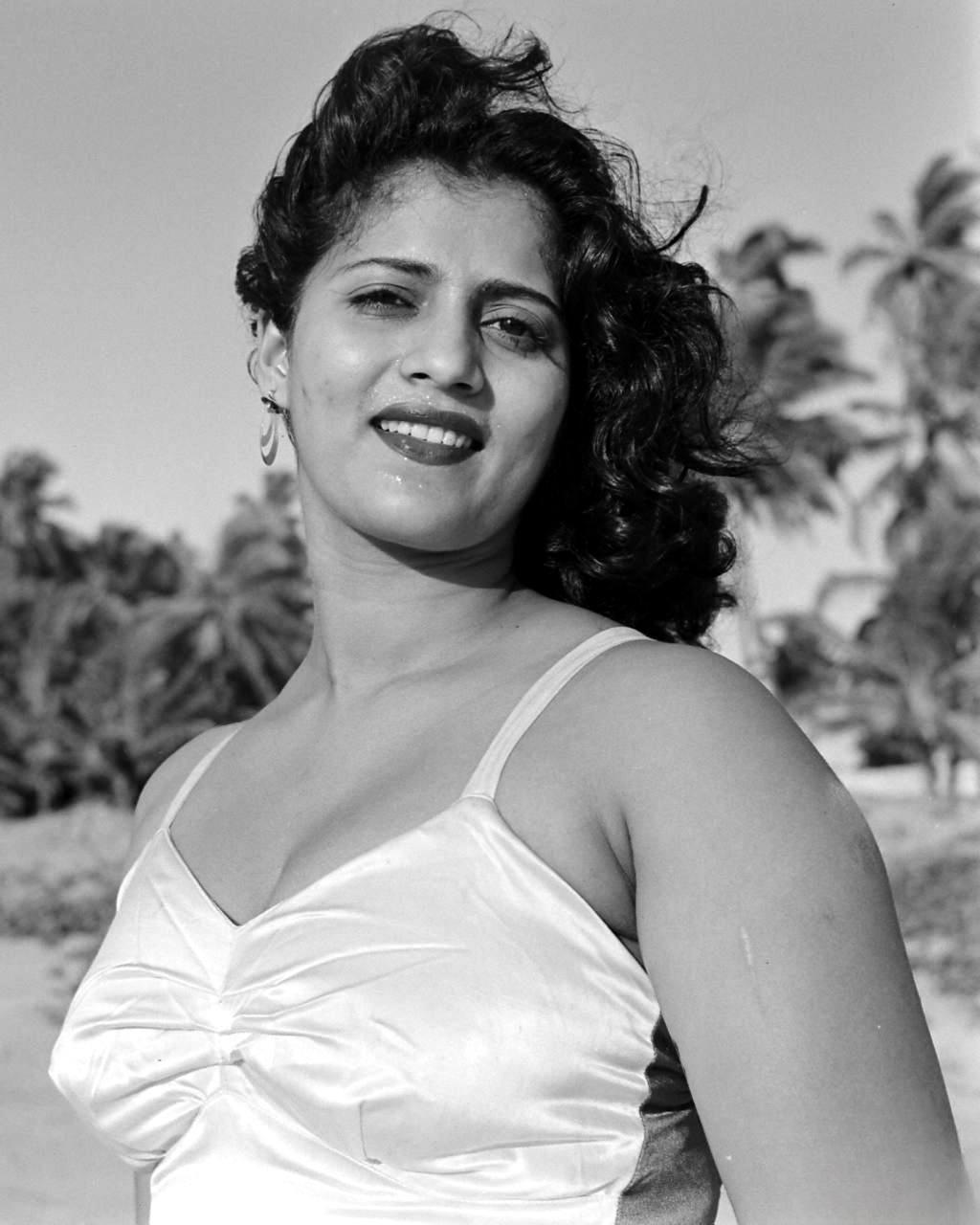
- Cabral posing for Life magazine, 1951
- Born: Mona Blasia Cabral; 3 February 1929; Socorro, Goa, Portuguese India
- Died: 11 September 1990 (aged 61); La Coucourde, France
- Other name: Miss Mohana
- Occupations: Actress; singer; producer; dancer
- Years active: 1948–1983
- Television: To Tell the Truth
- Spouse: Edward Dawning (m. 1951; died 1953) John Defrates (after 1953)
- Children: 2
- Relatives: Ophelia Cabral (sister)

Mona Blasia "Mohana" Cabral (3 February 1929 – 11 September 1990), also known as Miss Mohana, was an Indian actress, singer, television producer, and dancer based in France. She was known for her work in Hindi films, television, and tiatr productions.

== Early life ==
Mona Blasia Cabral was born on 3 February 1929, in the village of Socorro, Goa, which was then a part of Portuguese India. Coming from a Christian family, she was the eldest among her two sisters and three brothers. Cabral's father had previously worked in British Ceylon (now Sri Lanka) but returned to Goa in the late 1930s, securing a position as a cashier at Hindustan Construction Company in Bombay, British India. As a result, the family relocated to Bombay, with Cabral completing her primary education at a local school in Porvorim, Goa, and later continuing her studies at Victoria School in Mahim.

Afterward, Cabral attended Convent of Jesus and Mary, a boarding school in Poona, where she completed her academic pursuits. It was during this time that she found employment as a telephone operator at Lever Brothers in Bombay. This particular occupation proved to be pivotal in shaping her future career in the Hindi film industry. As a telephone operator, Cabral frequently interacted with popular personalities of the era, including figures from the film industry. It is worth noting that during that period, telephone services did not offer direct connections, and operators played a crucial role in facilitating communication between individuals.

Cabral was known for her passion for acting and singing since childhood. Writer Wilson Mazarello, in his literary work, acknowledged Cabral's beauty alongside her artistic abilities. During her education at Victoria School in Mahim, Cabral, together with her sister, actively participated in school concerts and annual gatherings, thereby cultivating their performance skills and fostering self-assurance. Cabral's breakthrough opportunity arrived when the emerging local playwright, A. F. Rodrigues, staged his tiatr production titled Opurbaechi Sun in Mahim. Recognizing their potential, Rodrigues personally invited Cabral and her sister Ophelia to participate, marking their official debut on the tiatr stage. The display of their abilities caught the attention of C. Alvares, a popular director within the Konkani theater scene.

== Career ==
Cabral was the first female artist who played a significant role in breaking barriers for women in the field of Konkani theater. Prior to Cabral, there had been other female performers in Konkani theater, but their presence was fleeting. The tradition of male actors assuming female roles had persisted due to the lack of consistent female performers. However, Cabral's arrival marked a turning point in this practice. She introduced a new era of professionalism among female tiatrists, inspiring an increasing number of women to pursue careers in the field. As a result, the reliance on male actors to portray female characters gradually diminished over time. In the present day, the need for male actors to assume such roles has completely vanished due to the abundance of female tiatrists. Cabral's breakthrough came in 1952 when director C. Alvares recognized her talent, offering her a role in his new tiatr production, Kortub Avoichem (Mother's Actions). In this production, Cabral was the sole female artist among a cast composed entirely of men. The scarcity of female performers during that era led to male actors such as Vincent de Saligão, Andrew Ferns, Master Vaz, and Remmie Colaço assuming female roles. However, Cabral's performance in Kortub Avoichem earned her a standing ovation from the audience, establishing her reputation as an actress. Additionally, director C. Alvares introduced Cabral during the opening chorus to the audience. This marked the beginning of a career for Cabral, as she went on to become the leading lady in subsequent tiatrs produced by C. Alvares. She appeared in popular productions such as Avoicho Xirap (Mother's Curse), Bail de Tarvotti (Seafarer's Wife)," Bhorvanso (Hope), and Ankvar Kazari (Bachelor Married), among others.

Cabral was a versatile artist known for her contributions to the Konkani stage. Throughout her career, she had the privilege of sharing the stage with actors including Anthony Mendes, A. R. Souza Ferrão, Effie Fernandes, Alfred Rose, Master Vaz, Andrew Ferns, and Remmie Colaço, among others. Her performances garnered attention, attracting audiences from various parts of Bombay and revitalizing the popularity of tiatr, a form of Goan musical theater. Cabral's talent extended beyond acting, as she also collaborated with directors apart from C. Alvares. Cabral brought a distinct charm and appeal to the Konkani stage, with her beauty serving as a catalyst for the growth of tiatr. Spectators from all corners of Bombay eagerly flocked to witness Cabral's appearances in tiatrs. In addition to her acting prowess, Cabral possessed a singing voice, which she showcased through duets with C. Alvares and other singers. Even today, her duets recorded on HMV Records continue to be broadcast by All India Radio in Panaji, preserving her musical legacy. Cabral has produced a number of musical recordings in collaboration with artists such as C. Alvares, Remmie Colaço, Chris Perry, Star of Arossim, and Anthony Mendes for HMV Records. Some of the popular songs include "Devachi Soirik," "Chokletti Dilear," "Tambddem Bonder," and "Axirvad Di Aaii." Prior to her involvement in the Konkani stage, Cabral had a modest presence in Hindi films, where she portrayed supporting roles. Her photogenic qualities and talent led to her inclusion in over 20 Hindi films, alongside Bollywood actors. Popular among her film credits are Insaniyat, Nagina, Saqi, Shart, Sansar, Patanga, Nadaan, Sawan Aya Re, Ashiana, Ashima, and Aag, among others. Cabral's contributions to the film industry were recognized internationally when she was invited as a guest of honor at the Cannes Film Festival in 1954.

Cabral took a hiatus from her involvement in tiatrs to embark on a professional journey to Beirut. After an extensive tenure on the Konkani stage, Cabral received a lucrative contract from television program producers based in Beirut, Lebanon. Collaborating with her sister Ophelia, she also participated in several television programs. During her time in Beirut, Cabral gained prominence as a producer of dance programs. Subsequently, she ventured to France, where she entered into matrimony with her longtime fiancé. Nonetheless, Cabral's love for Konkani and the Konkani stage persisted. Whenever opportunities arose, particularly in European countries, featuring Konkani programs or tiatrs, Cabral eagerly embraced the chance to partake, consistently positioning herself as a frontrunner in such productions. In 1983, while on holiday in India, Cabral made a memorable appearance in Aiz Nam Faleam (If not today, then tomorrow), a new tiatr staged by her brother-in-law Bab Peter and sister Ophelia, which garnered acclaim during its performances in Bombay and Goa. This marked the final occasion for tiatr audiences to witness Cabral's stage presence. Throughout her career, Cabral actively participated in over 200 tiatr performances and delivered approximately 40 songs, rekindling memories of her earlier days when she held a prominent position among female artists in the Konkani theater sphere.

== Personal life ==
Cabral was married twice. Her first marriage, in 1951, was marked by a series of events. Engaged in rehearsals for a song featured in the Hindi film Sansar (1951), Cabral found herself in the rehearsal room of Bombay's Ambassador Hotel. A young English man occupied a room directly opposite the rehearsal space. Perturbed by the incessant commotion generated by the rehearsals, his patience gradually wore thin over a span of three to four days. Finally reaching a breaking point, he succumbed to a fit of anger and promptly confronted the rehearsal room. However, upon catching sight of Cabral, his ire dissipated instantaneously, leading him to offer a sincere apology before promptly retreating to his own quarters. This man was Edward Dawning, a pilot serving in the Royal Indian Air Force. A bond formed between Cabral and Edward, culminating in love that ultimately led to their marriage. The couple had a son named Mark. However, their marriage was cut short when Edward met his death in an aviation accident at Calcutta airport a mere eighteen months after their nuptials.

In the 1950s, Cabral entered into her second marriage with a British man John Defrates CBE, who held the position of general manager at Hindustan Lever Limited. John was the son of Captain H F "Harry" Defrates, a paddle steamer captain from Weymouth, England. Their union was considered unconventional within their respective communities, which led Cabral and her husband to make the decision to sacrifice their professional careers. In response to objections from John's employer regarding his marriage to an Indian woman, he chose to resign from his position and pursue a diplomatic career with the United Nations. During the latter half of the 1950s, John was assigned to serve in Beirut, Lebanon, and Cabral accompanied him to this new posting. It was during their time in Beirut that Cabral and John welcomed their daughter, Clare, into the world. After spending nearly 25 years in Beirut, John's diplomatic duties led to a transfer to Vienna, Austria. Following John's retirement in 1986, he, along with Cabral and their daughter, relocated to France. In 1984, Cabral's father-in-law died in London at the age of 89. Cabral's son, Mark "Marik" Defrates (1950–2016), from her previous marriage, pursued a career as a chaos magician and jeweller based in Key West, Florida. Mark also established an online association called Z (Cluster) in the 1990s, which served as a platform for individuals interested in chaos magic. Cabral's daughter, Clare Defrates-Penelon, is married and currently resides with her children in La Coucourde, France.

== Death ==
Following a heart attack, Cabral died on 11 September 1990 in La Coucourde, France at age 61.

== Select filmography ==
Year	Film	Role	Notes
1948	Aag	Stage actress	First appearance, appeared as the female performer of the song "Raat Ko Ji Chamke Taare...".
1949	Sawan Aya Re		
1949	Char Din		
1949	Jagriti		
1949	Kamal		
1949	Patanga	Jwala	
1949	Rimjhim		
1951	Adaa		
1951	Nadan	Shashi	
1951	Nagina	Lilly	
1951	Sagai	Laundry lady	
1951	Sansar	Jamuna	
1952	Ashiana	Reeta Darjeeling	
1952	Chham Chhama Chham		
1952	Najaria		
1952	Saloni		
1952	Saqi	Jalwa	
1953	Shole : A Tale Of Burning Tears		
1954	Danka		
1954	Dost		
1954	Shart	Manisha	
1955	Insaniyat	Chameli	
1955	Marine Drive	Dolly	
1955	Sau Ka Note		
1955	Teerandaz		
1956	Taksaal		
1958	Baghi Sipahi		
1958	Suvarna Sundari		
