= Chic Chocolate =

Indian composer and musician (1916–1967)

- Chic Chocolate playing the trumpet

Background information
- Born: Antonio Xavier Vaz; 1916; Aldona, Goa, Portuguese India
- Died: May 1967 (aged 50–51) Bombay
- Genres: Jazz
- Instrument: Trumpet

Antonio Xavier Vaz (1916 – May 1967), known professionally as Chic Chocolate, was an Indian trumpeter who led a Jazz band at the Taj Mahal Hotel in Bombay and was one of Bombay's best known jazz musicians. He was also a Hindi film music composer and played trumpet in various soundtracks.

== Early life and influences ==
Chic was born Antonio Xavier Vaz in Aldona, Portuguese Goa, in 1916. He learned music at his local parochial school and, despite the wishes of his mother who wanted him to earn a "respectable" living as a mechanic, he followed his dreams of a life playing music.

Influenced by American jazz trumpeter Louis Armstrong, Chic styled himself after his great jazz hero—Chocolate's trumpet playing and "scatting" technique were a tribute to Armstrong. His stage presence has been recognized as dramatic, with accounts reporting that the musician would fall on one knee, while raising his instrument to the stars, during the band's crescendo. Chocolate earned the sobriquet, the "Louis Armstrong of India", as he not only played jazz like an African American, but also possessed a similarly dark complexion.

== Career ==
By the mid-40s, after had played in Rangoon and Mussourie, Chic had established himself as a popular Bombay jazz musician. He started out with a group called the Spotlights and by 1945 had formed his own outfit, Chic and the Music Makers, beating out 12 other bands to win a contract at Green's Hotel, which was owned by the Taj Mahal Hotel. A newspaper article from the time described Chic Chocolate's band as "Bombay's topflight band". Chic Chocolate occasionally led a two-trumpet barrage at the Green's Hotel with Chris Perry.

Like many Goan musicians of the time, Chic Chocolate played jazz live at the night but his days were spent in the film studios, recording and arranging sound tracks for movies. He had a flourishing career as a music composer in Bollywood movies. In 1951, he began his career as a music director with the movie Nadaan. Nadaan had a popular track list, including songs like Talat Mahmood's Aa Teri Tasvir Bana Lu and Lata Mangeshkar’s Sari Duniya Ko Piichhe Chodkar.

Chic Chocolate was an integral part of composer C. Ramchandra's team. Ramachandra is popularly credited with introducing swing into Bollywood with tunes such as Gore Gore O Banke Chore from Samadhi and Shola Jo Bhadke from Albela. However the credit for these songs is due to Chic Chocolate. Their collaboration in the 1952 film Rangili included the song Koi Dard Hamara Kya Samjhe, sung by Lata Mangeshkar. He is remembered for his work with Naasir in the 1956 film Kar Bhala, and he also collaborated with Madan Mohan.

Chic's lives as jazz man and film musician sometimes merged. He had a cameo appearance in the film Albela, along with his band in a song sequence dressing them in frilly Latinesque costumes. Chic capitalised on the film's success by dressing his band in those costumes in future live performances.

== Death ==
Chic died in May 1967 in Mumbai, aged 51. Shortly after, Chetan Anand’s Aakhri Khat was released. The bluesy song Rut Jawan Jawan featured several close-ups of Chic Chocolate playing his trumpet solos from the bandstand. Chic had lived with his wife, Martha and his children in an apartment in Colaba. He also had an illegitimate son by a girlfriend named Catherine before his marriage to Martha.
