= Nadan (1951 film) =

1951 film by Hira Singh

- Film poster
- Directed by: Hira Singh
- Written by: Shri Ram Chopra 'Saaz' (dialogues)
- Screenplay by: Hira Singh
- Based on: It Happened One Night (a 1934 American film)
- Produced by: S. R. Bhattacharya
- Starring: Dev Anand; Madhubala
- Cinematography: L. N. Verma
- Edited by: Vithal Bankar
- Music by: Chic Chocolate
- Production companies: M. & T. Studios Ltd.
- Release date: 1951
- Country: India
- Language: Hindi

Nadan is a 1951 Indian romantic-comedy film directed by Hira Singh and starring Dev Anand, Madhubala. It is based on the 1934 American film It Happened One Night. The film received mixed reviews from critics, but was popular with audience.

== Cast ==
- Dev Anand as Ranjan alias Shekhar
- Madhubala as Usha
- Madan Puri as Pukhraj
- Mehmood as Mahesh Pariyar (uncredited)
- Manmohan Krishna as Deen Dayal
- Chaman Puri
- Mohana Cabral

== Soundtrack ==
The music direction was of Chic Chocolate in his independent debut as a music director under, under the music supervision of his mentor C. Ramchandra whom he used to assist in the later's films as an assistant. The lyrics are written by Pyare Lal Santoshi.

Song	Singer(s)	Included in the film or only album record ?
"Aa Teri Tasveer Bana Loon"-1	Talat Mahmood	Both
"Aa Teri Tasveer Bana Loon"-2	Talat Mahmood	Both
"Door Se Hi Humse Karo"	Lata Mangeshkar	Both
"Sari Duniya Ko Peeche"	Lata Mangeshkar	Both
"Ulfat Ka Rasta Hai"	Lata Mangeshkar	Both
"Aisa Kya Kasoor Kiya, Dil Jo Choor Choor Kiya" (Film version)	Lata Mangeshkar, Mohammed Rafi	Both
"Kahin Bhag Na Jaye, Na Jaye Machharia"	Lata Mangeshkar, C. Ramchandra	Both
"Chalti Hui Gadi Jo Ho Jaye Phat Re, Peeche Na Hat Re"	Lata Mangeshkar, C. Ramchandra	Both
"Aisa Kya Kasoor Kiya, Dil Jo Choor Choor Kiya" (album version)	Lata Mangeshkar, C. Ramchandra	Album record
"Dilon Ke Melon Ka Naam Picnic, Nazar Ke Khelon Ka Naam Picnic"	C. Ramchandra, Geeta Dutt	Album record

The film was the sixteenth highest-grossing Hindi film of the year.

On 30 November, Meena Sastri of the journal Thought wrote that the poorly-made film was saved by Madhubala's work: "The incidents connecting the insipid plot are incredibly weak. [...] The main redeeming feature is the heroine's [Madhubala's] appealing beauty and considerable acting talent. This combination helps to carry her through a feeble role." In contrast, Baburao Patel observed that the actress looks ill and her beauty is "destroyed" by pimples. He, however, liked the film.
