= Cine Musicians Association =

Association of Indian musicians

- Abbreviation: CMA
- Formation: 1952
- Type: non profit Association
- Purpose: To Safeguard the Rights of CMA members
- Location: Mumbai, India
- Hon Gen Secretary: Kapil Gupta
- Affiliations: Federation of Western India Cine Employees
- Volunteers: 1000
- Website: http://www.cinemusiciansassociation.com/

The Cine Musicians Association (CMA) is an association of Indian musicians based in Mumbai. It has strength of some 1000 members, many of whom work in the film industry. Many of its members are music teachers who impart the knowledge of music to aspiring musicians. It was founded in 1952.
