= Chris Perry (musician) =

Indian musician and composer (1928–2002)

- Pereira in his later years
- Born: Xavier Pereira; 25 November 1928; Margão, Goa, Portuguese India
- Died: 25 January 2002 (aged 73); Margao, Goa, India
- Other names: Christopher Pereira; Bab Pinto
- Occupations: Musician; songwriter
- Years active: 1950s–1970s
- Spouse: Maria Costa (m. 1958)
- Partner: Lorna Cordeiro (c. 1961–1973)
- Children: 3
- Musical career
- Genres: Jazz; Konkani music; Indian classical music; World music
- Instruments: Trumpet; saxophone; flute; piano; guitar

Chris Perry (born Xavier Pereira; 25 November 1928 − 25 January 2002) was an Indian musician, composer, songwriter, and film producer who combined jazz with Konkani music. He is known in India as the "King of Cha Cha Cha" and the "Man with the Golden Trumpet", and was the composer of the signature song of All India Radio.

== Early life and career ==
Perry was born as Xavier Pereira in the neighborhood of Modsai in Margão, Goa, which was part of Portuguese India during the Portuguese Empire, to Agostinho Pereira, a local musician, and Maria Conceição Fernandes, a homemaker, in a Goan Catholic family. He grew up with seven siblings.

Perry's family was musical and, at a young age, he entered the Tiatr (musical theater) scene, under the name 'Bab Pinto'. He began staging his own tiatrs; he is remembered locally for the plays Noxibantlo Nhovro, Padricho Lob, and Vid Mog Kornaranchem. He became a proficient musician, particularly on the trumpet and saxophone, known for having perfect pitch (Absolute pitch), and for his ability to switch from trumpet to saxophone mid-song. He was also a prolific songwriter, writing many of the hits of his time. Perry took the traditional Goan style of music and blended it with jazz.

Through the late '50s, Perry moved back and forth between Bombay and Calcutta (now Kolkata), and had his own band, the Chris Perry Band. Even after becoming well-established, Perry had to take part in the accepted practice of finding gigs. Every morning, Goan musicians gathered at the Calcutta restaurant Alfred's. The major bandleaders—Perry, Tony Cyril, Dennis Vaz, Johnny Rodriges, Johnny Baptista, Mike Machado, had their own tables. Anyone who was having an event that evening would come in and "order" musicians, e.g. 'one trumpet and one piano'. Each musician was paid 15 rupees; 18 if they wore white jackets with black trousers. Perry also occasionally played in a two-trumpet act at the Taj Mahal Palace Hotel with the jazz star of the day, Chic Chocolate.

In the late 1950s, Bombay was an extremely cosmopolitan city, and people from all over the world had settled there. Western influences were flooding in and everything was becoming westernized—especially fashion and music. The best restaurants served Western food, and offered dance floors and jazz bands. At the pinnacle of these restaurants was La Bella, in Bombay's Fort District. Anyone who was anyone was there, the place was packed every night and, because alcohol was still strictly prohibited, the doors were closed to reporters. It is known, however, that the Chris Perry band got their foot in the Bombay door at La Bella (and, because Goa was still under Portuguese rule, they had to have special visas to work there).

By 1960, Perry and his band had a regular gig at Venice, the sophisticated nightclub in Bombay's Astoria Hotel. The Astoria is on Churchgate Street, the city's music and entertainment hub, and Venice was known as the 'jazz man's jazz club', a rendezvous for musicians from around India. Dave Brubeck played there in 1958, Duke Ellington in 1963.

== Personal life ==
In 1960, at the Bandra Fair in Bombay, Perry saw a 16 year-old singer, Lorna Cordeiro, perform the song "Underneath the Mango Tree". She was so good, and the audience reception so great, that he offered her a place with his band. Cordeiro, who was also from Goa and who had been brought to Bombay by the musician Raymond Albuquerque after she won a Connie Francis sound-a-like contest, was still in school. But she accepted and Perry became her mentor.

Cordeiro, who was compared to Shirley Bassey and Bessie Smith, had a powerful Contralto and a natural feel for jazz. Perry rehearsed with her for six months before introducing her to audiences, and taught her how to dress, move on stage and use the microphone. She made her debut at the Lido Room in the elegant Firpo's Restaurant, Calcutta, singing Ella Fitzgerald's version of "Cry Me a River." The band then began touring—to Delhi, Mussoorie, Shimla, and Ooty, before settling in Bombay.

Perry was known as a genius, a perfectionist, and an obsessive. (According to his son, he slept with his trumpet and, every morning, before doing anything else, had a cigarette and blew the trumpet. His drummer, Diogo DeSouza, said: "Whoever joined his band ended up refining his craft. He could tell from a distance even if one small note went wrong on any instrument. He would meticulously write down the notes for each musician and he expected them to play it just the way he wanted." According to De Souza, Perry once gave a band member a black eye for playing a note incorrectly. It was a show night. He brought the musician an ice pack, and gave all band members dark glasses. It became their look for the evening. Perry was also a gambler, known for losing the band's wages at the racetrack.

Perry wrote and recorded several Konkani language albums with Cordeiro. He was signed to His Master's Voice, which initially refused to let Cordeiro record in the Konkani language. Perry fought on her behalf and His Master's Voice relented. Once the music was released, Cardeiro's career was on its way. From then on, she was known simply as 'Lorna', and was a household name throughout India. Perry's songs were catchy, toe-tapping or romantic; all were a blend of Goan folk music and jazz elements. These songs became instant hits and garnered significant radio play; their popularity was helped by the love story between the two.

Audiences were drawn to Lorna, and to the obvious chemistry between her and Perry. Despite the fact that Perry was a married man with three sons, and their large age difference, the two began a very public extramarital affair while she was still a minor. Off-stage, Perry was jealous to the point where he would punch any man who spoke to Lorna. The relationship ended in 1973, when Perry returned to his wife Maria Costa, who he married in 1958, and family. However, he forced Cordeiro to sign a contract agreeing to not perform with anyone else for twenty years. Perry enforced this contract, often with violence. Despite the fact that she was a mega-star throughout India, and was known as the 'Nightingale of Goa', Cordeiro had to leave the music world completely. She never married, and became a recluse and alcoholic. In 1995, when Perry was no longer a threat to her, she made a successful comeback.

Perry encouraged the careers of other musicians and his songs were performed by Mohammed Rafi, Asha Bhonsle, Usha Uthup, Adolf Fernandes, Seby Fernandes, Hema Sardesai, Lulu Fortes, C. Alvares, Ophelia, Mohana, M. Boyer and H. Britton.

== Later career ==
By the mid-1970s, Bombay's jazz scene was dying. The government had raised the entertainment tax to 40%, making the business unviable for smaller establishments. Many musicians left the country or switched to film work. Perry went into film. He worked as an assistant to film composer Mohammed Zahur Khayyam, conducted Khayyam's orchestra for the film Trishul and Kabhi Kabhi. He also worked for the composers Laxmikant–Pyarelal, R. D. Burman and Kalyanji–Anandji. In 1977, he co-founded a film production company which produced Bhuierantlo Munis (Cave Man or Man From the Caves), the first colour film in the Konkani language. The movie was based on Alexandre Dumas's novel The Count of Monte Cristo, which features a prominent character named Abbé Faria, which in turn was based on the Goan Catholic monk, Abbé Faria. Perry wrote the music and songs, including the hit Dulpod "Undrea Mhojea Mama", and the popular songs "Bhuierantlo Munis", "Nokre", "Chup Chup" and "Adeus".

On 25 January 2002, Perry died of Parkinson's disease at Holy Spirit Nursing Home in Margao, Goa. Two of his sons, Glenn and Miles Perry, who recorded the hit song "Moje Maim" when they were children, are successful musicians. In 2019, a road in Margao was re-named 'Chris Perry Street'.

In 2015, Goan director Bardroy Barretto released the award-winning film Nachom-ia Kumpasar (Let's Dance to the Rhythm). It is a musical drama, in Konkani, which tells the story of the romance between Perry and Lorna, who are played by Vijay Maurya and Palomi Ghosh. The story is told through 17 popular Konkani songs from the 1960s and 1970s that were re-recorded for this film. Most of the songs were written by Perry, and the list includes those that were originally recorded by Perry and Lorna. These include "Abghat Kelo", "Aik Re Khobrankara", "Tuzo Mog", and the song that launched Lorna's career, "Nachoiea Kumpasar".

== Awards ==
- Best Composer, Sound of Surprise, Bombay Musicians' Association (Cine Musicians Association) 1964

== Discography ==
Albums

- Concanim Hit Parade With Chris Perry And A Galaxy Of Top Artistes (1969), His Master's Voice
- Concanim Hits (1971), His Master's Voice
- Maze Le Lo (1976, with Mahesh Kumar, Naresh Kumar, Shakila Bano Bhopali), His Master's Voice
- Frank Fernand And Chris Perry Vol 2 (1976)
- Hit Music From Goa (1977), EMI
- Concanim Hits: Chris Perry And A Host Of Stars (1979)
- Chris Perry's Golden Hits (1979, Lorna Cordeiro, Usha Mangeshkar, Ambar Kumar, Miles Perry, Giles Perry, H. Britton, Bab Peter, Tony Carr, M. Boyer, Antonet, Adolf. Re-released 2006)
- Lorna-Unforgettable Hits (2007, Lorna Cordeiro, as writer and arranger), Sinaris

EPs

- Bebdo (1969, Lorna), His Master's Voice
- Chris Perry's Hit Songs (1970, Mohammed Rafi & Lorna Cordeiro), His Master's Voice
- Chris Perry's Hit Songs (Concanim) (1973, Mohammed Rafi & Lorna Cordeiro), His Master's Voice
- From Usha With Love (1976), EMI
- Super Pops III (1979), Philips Records

Singles

- "Figaro Adlam" / "Tabdem Caoado" (1958), Columbia Records
- "Maim Sun" / "Chockri Chor" (1958), Columbia
- "Bombay Baion" / "Valentina's Escape" (1966), His Master's Voice
- "Piso" (1969) Lorna Cordeiro
- "Bebdo" (1969) Lorna Cordeiro
- "Saudichem Gantar" (1969) Lorna Cordeiro
- "Sopon" (1969) Lorna Cordeiro
- "Caliz Boong Bang Zata" (1969), Tony Carr & Delphine
- "Noxibac Roddtam" (1970), Lorna Cordeiro and Mohammed Rafi
- "Maria" (1970), Lorna Cordeiro and Mohammed Rafi
- "Bom Jesuchea Conventan" (1970), Lorna Cordeiro and Mohammed Rafi
- "Combea Sadari" (1970), Lorna Cordeiro and Mohammed Rafi
- "Tuzo Mog" (1971), Lorna Cordeiro
- "Nachoea La-Bam-Ba" (1971), Lorna Cordeiro
- "Abghat Kelo"(1971), Lorna Cordeiro
- "Aik Re Khobrankara" (1971), Lorna Cordeiro
- "Amerikak Pauxi"
- "Lisboa"
- "Sorga Rajeant"
- "Fottkiro Mog"
- "Red Rose" Lorna Cordeiro
- "I'll Always Love You"
- "Moje Put" (1969), M. Boyer
- "Cu Cu Ru Cu Cu" (1973), Tony Carr
- "Mog Boom Boom Boom" (1973), Bab Peter
- "Moje Maim" (1973), Giles Perry, Miles Perry
- "Beautiful" (1974), Usha Uthup
- "Marialina" (1976), H. Britton
- "Bus Conductor" (1976), H. Britton
- "Kazarachem Utor" (1976), H. Britton
- "Nokre" (1976), Adolf Fernandes
- "Aik Re Khobrankara"
- "Nachoiea Kumpasar"
- "Piti Piti Mog", Antonet

== Film credits (music) ==
- Kabhi Kabhie (1976)
- Trishul (1978, uncredited-music department)
- Nachom-ia Kumpasar (2015)
