= Frank Fernand =

Indian filmmaker (1919–2007)

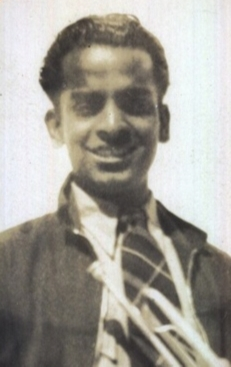
- Fernandes at the Taj Mahal Hotel, 1939
- Born: Franklin Fernandes; 3 May 1919; Curchorem, Goa, Portuguese India
- Died: 1 April 2007 (aged 87); Mumbai, Maharashtra, India
- Occupations: Film maker; musician

Franklin Fernandes (3 May 1919 – 1 April 2007), better known as Frank Fernand, was an Indian filmmaker and musician who is known for some of the earliest films in Konkani cinema, such as Amchem Noxib (1963) and Nirmon (1966).

== Early life ==
Franklin Fernandes was born in Curchorem, Goa and had his initial training in music from Diego Rodrigues and mastered violin and trumpet. In 1936, he moved to Bombay. He began playing music under well-known band-leader George Theodore at Green's Hotel and Taj Mahal Hotel.

== Career ==
=== Early musical career ===
In 1942, he left Mumbai for Mussoorie to play with Rudy Cotton's band and blossomed into a fine jazz musician. He lived and played in Delhi for a while the same year. In the 1940s, when he was playing at a resort in Mussoorie, Mahatma Gandhi happened to be passing through. Frank Fernand listened to one of his lectures, and it brought about a big change in him. He began trying to find a way to play jazz in an Indian way.

=== Indian jazz ===
India's first prime minister Jawaharlal Nehru's biography The Discovery of India is also said to have influenced him deeply, and resulted in his complete change of outlook. With a sense of patriotism, he later considered 15 August (India's independence day) every year as the greatest event of the year. He was already back in Mumbai in 1946, playing with Micky Correa and his band, among others. A turning point in his career and life came in 1948 when he joined the celebrated Hindi music director-duo Shankar Jaikishan. Raj Kapoor's Barsat was his major assignment under the duo's baton. Later he worked under top-level music directors and had close association with Anil Biswas, Kishore Kumar, Roshan, C. Ramchandra and others.

Fernand was music conductor for many films including Don, Hera Pheri, Zanjeer and Victoria No. 203. He was music assistant for a few films including Johny Mera Naam.

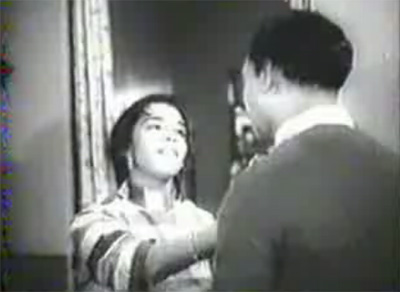
A still from Frank Fernandes' monochrome 1963 Konkani film Amchem Noxib.

His last assignment in the Hindi film industry was as the first assistant of Kalyanji Anandji, another popular music director duo. His deep love for his mother-tongue Konkani motivated him to produce Amchem Noxib under his banner Frank Films with C. Alvares and Anthony Mendes in main roles. He came out with his second film Nirmon (Destiny), This film had a powerful story with C. Alvares, Shalini Mardolkar, Anthony D'Sa and Jacinto Vaz in the main cast and won the Certificate of Merit for regional films, the first of its kind for Konkani, at the hands of the then Prime Minister, Indira Gandhi.

Frank also provided the musical score for the Konkani movie Mhoji Ghorkarn directed by A Salam. Encouraged by the success of two Konkani films, he made a Hindi film Priya in 1965. It had Sanjeev Kumar and Tanuja in the lead, with some catchy songs composed by Kalyanji-Anandji. But it bombed at the box office. Not losing heart, Frank again attempted to produce another Hindi film Ahat inspired by the popular English film Wait Until Dark. The film was never released.

Frank Fernand has set to music some memorable lyrics by noted poets, most remembered of them all being "Fulam Zai" and "Sobit Amchem Goem" by Dr Manohar Sardesai, for which he won the Bombay Journal Award.

He had also staged a tiatr entitled Bekar Patrao in the 1980s with a ten-piece orchestra introduced for the first time. He pioneered as a classical jazz player and in trumpet concerto by Handel under music maestro Victor Paranjoti. In 1958, he organized a concert wherein he played the Evolution of Music, Jazz, starting with Negro Spirituals, Dixie Land Jazz, followed by New Orleans Jazz, Sound of America commercial music, Symphony Jazz and Ravi Shankar's Caravan.

== Personal life ==
He has two daughters from his first marriage to Maxi Perera, named Elphin and Doris. From his second marriage to Madalena Velho, he has one son and one daughter, named Max and Larissa. Frank Fernand died of Parkinson's disease on 1 April 2007 at Mumbai.

== Legacy ==
A book by Naresh Fernandes called The Taj Mahal Foxtrot accurately notes down his early beginnings and also the beginnings of jazz in India in which Frank Fernand played a vital part.

== Filmography ==
=== Producer ===
- Amchem Noxib (1963) (Konkani)
- Nirmonn (1966) (Konkani)
- Priya (1965) (Hindi)
- Ahat (Hindi) (unreleased)

=== Music conductor ===
- Victoria No. 203 (1972)
- Zanjeer (1973)
- Haath Ki Safai (1975)
- Hera Pheri (1976)
- Don (1978)

=== Music assistant ===
- Johny Mera Naam (1970)

Waqt(1965)

=== Musical score ===
- Mhoji Ghorkarn (1969) (Konkani)
