= Prem Kumar (Konkani actor) =

Indian actor and director (1929–2007)

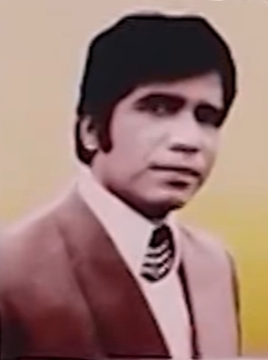
- D'Costa in a undated photo released by Tiatr Academy of Goa
- Born: Pedro Xavier da Costa; 8 September 1929; Chandor, Goa, Portuguese India
- Died: 12 October 2007 (aged 78); Grant Road, Mumbai, Maharashtra, India
- Occupations: Actor; playwright; theatre director; lyricist; composer
- Years active: 1945–c. 2007
- Spouse: Ramona D'Costa
- Relatives: C. Alvares (brother-in-law); Betty Ferns (sister-in-law)

Pedro Xavier D'Costa (né da Costa; 8 September 1929 – 12 October 2007), known professionally as Prem Kumar, was an Indian actor, playwright, theatre director, lyricist and composer known for his work in Hindi, Konkani films, and tiatr productions. Known as a transformative figure in the tiatr stage, he elevated the quality of Konkani tiatr to a level comparable to dramas in other regional languages. In addition to his writing and staging of 55 tiatrs, he also showcased his talent by performing in over 500 tiatrs.

== Early life ==
Pedro Xavier D'Costa, born as Pedro Xavier da Costa on 8 September 1929, in Chandor, Goa. which was a part of Portuguese India under the Portuguese Empire (now in India). His parents were Xavier da Costa and Damiana Josefa Fichardo. D'Costa received his primary education in Bombay. From a young age, he demonstrated his passion for tiatr, a form of musical theater unique to the Goan community. His journey in tiatr began during his teenage years when he showcased his talents in school concerts, leaving an impression on his mentors. Displaying a level of ambition and creativity, he ventured into writing his first tiatr at the age of 13. However, breaking into the professional Konkani stage proved to be a formidable challenge for a young performer like D'Costa. The competition was intense, and gaining recognition often required influential support.

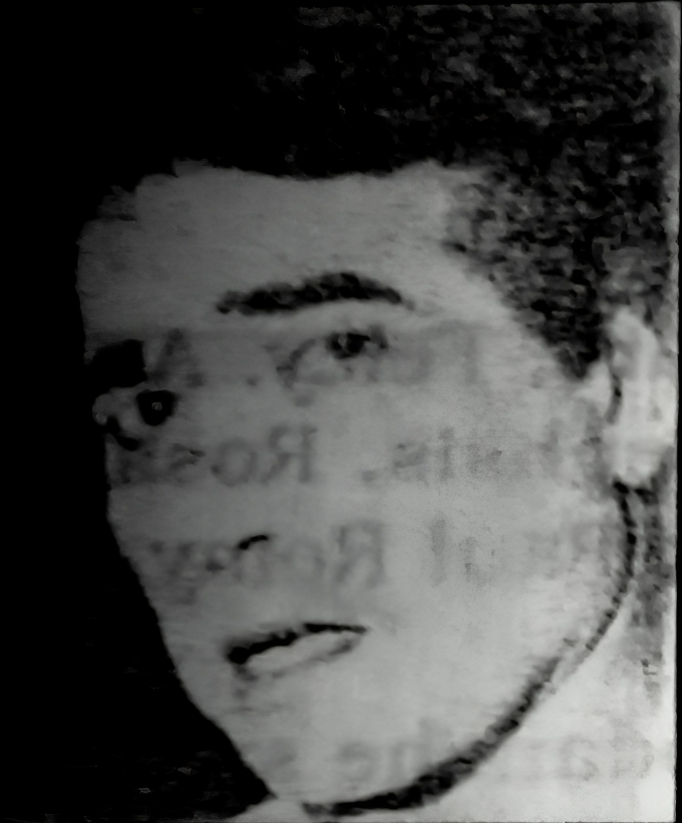
D'Costa during his youth

Undeterred by these obstacles, D'Costa sought guidance from Anthony D'Sa, a figure known for nurturing emerging talents in the Konkani theater scene. D'Sa, known for his mentorship of aspiring artists, generously extended his advice and assistance to D'Costa. With D'Sa's support, D'Costa successfully premiered his inaugural tiatr, titled Mhozo Put (My Son), in 1945 at the Princess Theatre Bhangwadi, Bombay. Demonstrating his multifaceted talents, he not only wrote but also directed the production. In pursuit of further artistic growth, D'Costa subsequently joined the Junior Artists Association in Bombay. However, his experiences within the association were not entirely harmonious, as his colleagues did not provide the expected level of cooperation.

== Career ==
D'Costa, embarked on a career in the Hindi film industry with the aspiration of showcasing his acting talent. As a member of the Cine Artistes' Association, a film organization in Bombay, D'Costa approached producer-director Dhirubhai Desai, hoping for an opportunity. Impressed by D'Costa's abilities, Desai cast him in a minor role as a blind man in the film Unchi Haweli. Despite the challenges faced by middle-aged actors in securing substantial roles, D'Costa's performance caught the attention of Desai's production manager, Pralhad, who recognized his potential and assigned him the role. To adhere to the prevailing norms of Hindi film circles, D'Costa adopted the name Prem Kumar, shedding his Christian name. Following his debut, D'Costa took on various minor roles in Hindi movies such as Mera Salam (1957), Bandish (1955), Shaukeen, Hum Bhi Insan Hai, Sakhi, Bahadur (1953), and Hamara Hak before eventually returning to the Konkani theatrical tradition known as tiatr. His performances caught the attention of K. N. Singh, a character actor in Hindi films, who praised him for his acting skills. D'Costa's portrayal of a Muslim molvi (priest) in the film Hamara Hak garnered acclaim for his authentic delivery of Arabic dialogues, defying expectations as a Goan Catholic. Despite a promise from veteran director S. M. Esmael for a significant role in an upcoming Hindi film, fate intervened when Esmael died, leaving the promise unfulfilled.

However, D'Costa's true passion lay in the Konkani stage. Proficient in the Konkani language and finding greater expressiveness in his native tongue, D'Costa abandoned Hindi films and dedicated himself to the development and growth of tiatr. During a visit to Princess Theatre Bhangwadi, D'Costa accompanied Vasant Joglekar, a known figure in Marathi theatre, to watch a Konkani tiatr by a prominent writer-director. D'Costa was humbled by the scene depicting a landlord's house against a jungle backdrop, which inspired his determination to elevate the tiatr stage. He bid farewell to Hindi films and embarked on a journey to write and stage new tiatrs, eagerly awaiting opportunities to showcase his work. In the 1950s, D'Costa introduced innovative concepts to the tiatr stage, employing projectors and slides to enhance visual experiences. Writer Fausto V. da Costa states, D'Costa's tiatrs incorporated spectacular scenes reminiscent of movies, captivating audiences from all walks of life. Combining engaging storylines, rich dialogues, and high literary standards, he addressed diverse themes of family, society, and religion in his productions. His unique comedic style and emotionally resonant cantos further contributed to the appeal of his tiatrs.

Fausto V. da Costa further writes, D'Costa's contributions extended beyond performance aspects, revolutionizing the Konkani stage with visually striking sets, dialogue depth, and mesmerizing light effects. He introduced novel stage designs, including the jackknife stage, revolving stage, and half-sliding stage, setting him apart from his contemporaries. Drawing from his experiences in Hindi films, D'Costa incorporated scenes depicting rice fields, ploughing, railways, airplanes, waterfalls, and more, enriching the tiatr experience. With technical brilliance in stage setting and lighting, D'Costa aimed to elevate the standards of Konkani tiatrs, infusing them with a touch of cinematic grandeur. D'Costa wrote and produced a total of 55 plays. Despite their elaborate sets, several of his popular productions, such as Dukh (Pain), Kakut (Mercy), Peleache Vostuchi Axea Korum Naie, and Ordhi Bakri (Half Bakri), surpassed 100 performances. Dukh was performed a total of 126 times, Kakut had over 100 showings, and Peleachi Vostuchi Axea Korum Naie achieved 135 performances. One of D'Costa's acclaimed productions is Jivit Ek Sopon (Life is a dream), featuring the talent of Betty Ferns. In this play, Ferns portrayed a character disguised as a male, delivering a memorable performance.

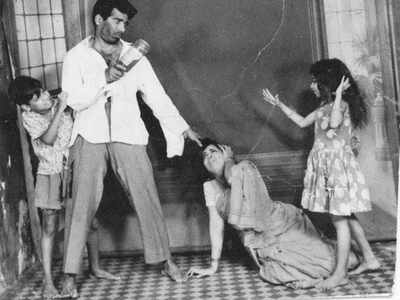
From left to right: Bab Peter, D'Costa, Ophelia, and Bai Catherine, a shot taken from D'Costa's tiatr Dukh

D'Costa set a record by organizing 25 performances of Jivit Ek Sopon, within a span of 12 days in Goa. D'Costa's plays often tackled important social issues. Works like Abdul Narayan D'Souza and Fulam Ani Kantte (Flowers and Thorns) addressed the theme of communal harmony, while Vavraddi (Labourer), in which D'Costa himself took part, provided an authentic depiction of rural life. Notably, D'Costa's tiatr Piso (Madman) stands out as the sole monologue performance in the tiatr genre to date. In Maria Magdalena (Mary Magdalene), D'Costa received praise from Valerian Cardinal Gracias for his portrayal of a religious narrative. The play featured a scene in which water miraculously sprang from a rock upon Jesus' instruction, garnering applause from the audience. D'Costa's popular tiatrs include Vauraddi, Rinn (Debt), Dukh, Kakut, Jivit ek Sopon, Konnank Mhunnon Maim (Whom should I call mother?), Abdul Narayan D'Souza, Jawan (Soldier), Peleache Vostuchi Axea Korum Naie, Fulam ani Kantte, Upkar Naslolo, Ordhi Bhakri, Govai (Witness), Kaido (Rule), Koidi, Rogtac Tanello (Blood Thirsty), Khoto Poiso (Fake Money), Rekad (Regards), Tufan (Storm), Angounn (Solemn vow), Fottkiro (Liar), No Vacancy, Ghatki Voni (Traitor Sister-in-law), Ixttaghot (Friendship), Vantte (Division), Maria Magdalena, Gorib (Poor), Mortikar (Killer), Vadiu, Amchi Bhas (Our Language), Ugddas (Remembrance), Dhorji (Tailor), Noxib (Luck), Abru (Respect), among others. Y. B. Chavan, the Chief Minister of Maharashtra at the time, was impressed to realize that he was presenting an award to the actor D'Costa, who had delivered a memorable performance as a disabled character in Angounn.

D'Costa's notable work included Rinn, a production that involved an innovative use of a sliding stage. In this tiatr, he depicted a courtroom drama by transitioning the stage between the courtroom setting and flashbacks of the events. His tiatr Jawan expressed a patriotism for one's country. Whereas the theatrical production Mortikar depicted the escape of a killer using a visual display of a road scene, portraying the criminal running away. D'Costa's directing style emphasized the significance of costumes and voice modulation to enhance each character's performance. He performed not only in Goa and Bombay but also in various cities across India, including Poona, Ahmedabad, Delhi, Calcutta, and Mangalore. Additionally, he staged tiatrs in Gulf countries. D'Costa produced his own audio cassette titled Lojen Baulolem Ful and aired many of his plays on All India Radio and television. He also made contributions to the Konkani film industry, producing and writing lyrics for the film Boglantt, in which he played the lead role alongside actress Rita Rose. D'Costa has provided commentary and dialogues on numerous cassette recordings. Beyond his theatrical pursuits, D'Costa was a composer of songs. He crafted numerous compositions for tiatrs, as well as standalone pieces for sideshows. Writer André Raphael Fernandes writes, while D'Costa's focus primarily lay in acting, his musical contributions showcased his mastery of the Konkani language.

Historian Wilson Mazarello writes, D'Costa not only took on the main roles but also excelled in portraying character roles. He meticulously prepared for his roles, paying close attention to details such as costumes and makeup to enhance the portrayal of the characters. Additionally, D'Costa was known to produce his own tiatrs at regular intervals, typically every two years. Throughout his career, D'Costa displayed his versatility as an actor, portraying a diverse range of characters, including fathers, landlords, farmers, lunatics, and beggars. His plays often conveyed important messages, underscoring the intrinsic connection between farmers and the land in works like Vauraddi. D'Costa emphasized the dignity of manual labor and encouraged the educated to consider agriculture as a meaningful occupation. Mazarello further writes, D'Costa's impact on the tiatr community is extensive, with over 500 tiatr performances to his credit, encompassing both his own productions and collaborations with fellow artists.

== Awards ==
D'Costa's contributions to the realms of writing, acting, and stagecraft have earned him numerous awards. During the commemoration of the Konkani tiatrs centenary, the Kala Academy of Goa bestowed a special honor upon him. Among his accolades are the Konkani Sahitya Samiti Award, the Maharashtra Prohibition Award, and the Cine Times Awards. Furthermore, the then Chief Minister of Goa, Daman and Diu, Dayanand Bandodkar, presented D'Costa with an award for his tiatr production titled Vauraddi (Labourer). D'Costa's has amassed over sixty trophies. This includes the trophy presented to him by Bandodkar, as well as a gold medal recognizing his talents in acting, directing, and presenting tiatrs. Among his other honors are the IGP Arun Bhagat Shield, The Goan Review's Best Director Award in 1997, and the Sonskruti Puroskar from the Dalgado Konknni Akademi.

== Legacy ==
Following D'Costa's death, the Tiatr Academy of Goa (TAG) posthumously published three of his popular tiatrs, namely Mortikar (Killer), Abdul Naryan D'Souza, and Jivit Ek Sopon (Life is a dream). Moreover, the Goa Konkani Akademi published two of his tiatrs, Jawan (Soldier) and Fulam Ani Kantte (Flowers and Thorns), in book format, ensuring their preservation for future generations.
