= Bhuierantlo Munis =

- Produced by: Tony Coutinho; Chris Perry
- Starring: C. Alvares; Ophelia; Rico Rod; Cyriaco Dias; Robin Vaz; Souza Ferrao; Betty Fernandes; Paul Romy
- Release date: 1977
- Country: India
- Language: Konkani

Bhuierantlo Munis (English: Cave Man) is a 1977 Indian Konkani-language drama film. The first colour film in Konkani, it was produced under the banner of Chripton Motion Pictures by Tony Coutinho and Chris Perry and released in 1977. The film was shot in Goa, and also has footage shot in Paris, America and an ice-skating competition in Russia.

== Plot ==
The movie's story is based on Alexandre Dumas's novel The Count of Monte Cristo, which in turn was based on a Goan, Abbe Faria.

== Cast ==
The film has Ivo Almeida Coutinho and Helen Pereira in the main lead and a star cast consisting of C. Alvares, Ophelia, Rico Rod, Cyriaco Dias, Robin Vaz, Souza Ferrao, Betty Fernandes, comedian Paul Romy and in a guest role, model Radha Bartake.

== Music ==
The music for the film was provided by the producer Chris Perry, who had earlier composed music for Bollywood films. Chris Perry wrote lyrics for and composed all the songs, except for the traditional dulpods.

Asha Bhosle sang the title song of the movie Bhuierantlo Munis. Another immortal number from the movie was Nokre sung by Adolf. There were medley of dulpods including the popular Undrea Mhojea Mama, Moddgonvam Toviaguere, Combea Sadari, Chup Chup sung by Adolf and Mabel, Adeus sung by Adolf were other memorable numbers.

In versions apart from the movie, Combea Sadari was sung by Mohammad Rafi, and Nokre and Adeus were sung by Lorna.

== See also ==
- Konkani cinema
- Nirmon
