= Nirmon =

1966 Indian film directed by A. Salam

- Directed by: A. Salam
- Based on: Enoch Arden
- Produced by: Frank Fernand
- Starring: C. Alvares; Shalini; Anthony D’Sa; Ophelia; Souza Ferrao; Antonette; Jacinto Vaz
- Edited by: R. V. Shirkhande
- Music by: Frank Fernand
- Release date: 1966
- Country: India
- Language: Konkani

Nirmon is a 1966 Indian Konkani-language film. It was directed by A. Salam and produced by Frank Fernand. The film features C. Alvares, Shalini Mardolkar, Anthony De Sa, Ophelia Cabral, A. R. Souza Ferrão, Antonette Mendes, and Jacinto Vaz.

== Cast and crew ==
Nirmon was Frank Fernand's second production. It had story and direction from A. Salam, music by Fernand, dialogue by C. Alvares, and screenplay and editing by R. V. Shirkhande. The film stars Shalini Mardolkar, C. Alvares, Titta Pretto, Anthony D'Sa, Jacinto Vaz, Antonette Mendes, Ophelia, Jack Souza Ferrão and J. P. Souzalin.

== Inspiration ==
Nirmonn is based on Lord Tennyson's character from the 1864 poem Enoch Arden.

== Remake ==
In 1967, it was remade into the Bollywood movie Taqdeer, in which Shalini Mardolkar took the lead role as in the original film. Taqdeer, produced by Rajshri Productions was dubbed into seven other languages. The Hindi film was also directed by A. Salam. In 2015, a Konkani remake of the film was released with the title Nirmon the Destiny.

== Awards ==
The film won two National Awards at the hands of India’s then Prime Minister Indira Gandhi. C. Alvares earned best actor for his lead role. The film won the Certificate of Merit for regional films at the 13th National Film Awards, the first of its kind for Konkani.

== Music ==
The songs of Nirmon have become standards. The music was released on Angel Records under EMI of The Gramophone Company of India, manufactured and distributed by The Gramophone Company.

Song	Singer	Picturised on	Composer	Lyricist	Video
"Korat Upkar" (Kazar Zaunk Asa)	Jacinto Vaz	Jacinto Vaz	?	C. Alvares	Video on YouTube
"Dol Mhojea Bai"	Shalini Mardolkar	Shalini Mardolkar	?	C. Alvares	Video on YouTube
"Claudia" (male version)	?	C. Alvares, Shalini Mardolkar	Romeo Mendes	?	Video on YouTube
"Claudia" (female version)	Romeo Mendes, Antonette Mendes, Martha	Shalini, Antonette, Romeo Mendes, Ophelia	Romeo Mendes	?	Video on YouTube
"Nach Atamchem"	Carmo Rod	Souza Ferrao, Tony Gomes	?	C. Alvares	Video on YouTube
"Vavraddi Kunbi"	Robin Vaz	Souza Ferrao, Tony Gomes	?	Souza Ferrao	
