= C. Alvares =

Indian actor and singer (1920–1999)

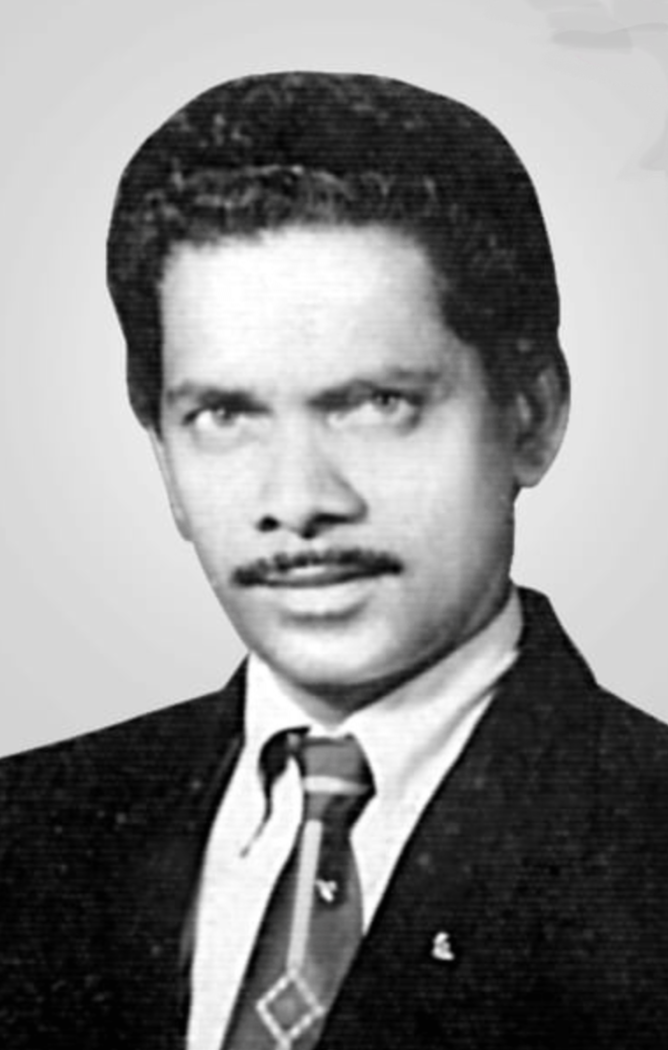
- Portrait of Alvares during his youth
- Born: Celestino Santana Francisco Alvares; 1 August 1920; Saligão, Goa, Portuguese India
- Died: 27 February 1999 (aged 78); Mumbai, Maharashtra, India
- Occupations: Actor; singer; playwright; director
- Notable work: Amchem Noxib; Nirmon; Bhuierantlo Munis
- Children: 4
- Relatives: Betty Ferns (sister-in-law); Prem Kumar (brother-in-law)

Celestino Santana Francisco Alvares (1 August 1920 – 27 February 1999), known professionally as C. Alvares, was an Indian actor, singer, playwright, and director known for his work in Konkani films and tiatr (musical theatre) productions. One of the greatest Konkani theatre performers, he was dubbed the "King of Duets." Alvares is also credited with introducing several women to the Konkani stage. He is a recipient of the Best Actor Award for his lead role in Nirmon.

== Early life ==
Celestino Santana Francisco Alvares was born on 21 August 1920 in Saligao, Bardez. His father, Caetan Alvares, was also a dedicated tiatrist. He received his primary education in Portuguese up to the Primeiro Grau (First Grade) at a government school in Saligao. Later, he studied up to the fourth standard at a local high school. In 1927, at the age of seven (in 1927), he participated in his tiatr, Mhoji Ghorkann (My Wife), which was written by his father. Inspired by his father, he later began writing his own tiatrs.

== Career ==
Alvares specialised in composing and singing poignant duets on various social issues, so he was called the "King of Duets". He acted in two of the most memorable Konkani films, including Amchem Noxib (1963), Nirmon (1966), Mhoji Ghorkarn, Bhuierantlo Munis (1977), and Uddta to Buddta. He received the award for Best Actor for Nirmon, while the film won a National Award.

Alvares is credited with renewing the trend of female participation on the Konkani stage. He encouraged the maximum number of young women who succeeded in earning a reputation for themselves as actresses. Some of whom he introduced on the Konkani stage were Shalini Mardolkar, Philomena Braz, Carmen Rose, Cecilia Machado, Antonette Mendes, Mohana Cabral, Ophelia, Jessie Dias, and Betty Ferns.

Alvares has written 107 tiatrs besides acting in thousands of tiatrs during the span of 60 years that he served the tiatr stage. Because of his lifelong work, he has been called the greatest contributor to the Konkani stage. He also produced the Konkani film Faxi Mogachi.

== Awards and accolades ==
- He won the first prize for "Best Acting" for four consecutive years in competitions organized by Mumbai’s Cine Times.
- In 1966, he received an award for "Best Acting" at a national-level competition organized by the Government of India, presented by then Prime Minister Indira Gandhi.
