= J. P. Souzalin =

Indian playwright and actor (1904–1976)

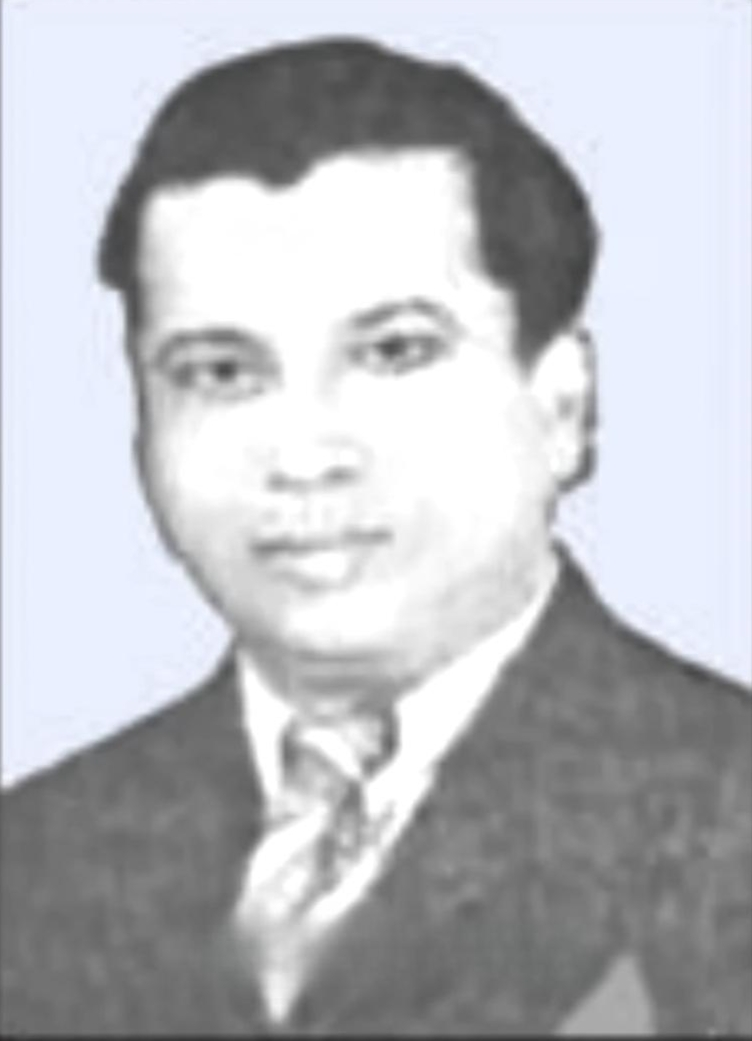
- Portrait of Fernandes during his youth
- Born: José Pascoal Fernandes; 22 March 1904; Calvim, Goa, Portuguese India, Portuguese Empire (now in India)
- Died: 18 July 1976 (aged 72); Bombay, Maharashtra (now Mumbai), India
- Occupations: Playwright; theatre director; producer; actor; singer
- Years active: 1935–1976
- Notable work: Nirmon (1966)

José Pascoal Fernandes (22 March 1904 – 18 July 1976), known professionally as J. P. Souzalin, was an Indian playwright, theatre director, theatrical producer, actor, and singer known for his work in Konkani films and tiatr productions. Referred to as the "Cecil B. DeMille of the Konkani stage," Fernandes was known for his religious dramas, having written and directed 40 tiatrs. He was a senior tiatrist during the golden phase of tiatr from the 1930s to the 1970s. During a time when Saib Rocha, a Konkani playwright, was unable to continue due to health issues, Fernandes and Aleixinho De Candolim took on much of the responsibility for producing Konkani plays.

== Career ==
In the city of Bombay, Fernandes became a valued member of Saib Rocha's Union Jack Dramatic Company. Initially known for his acting abilities, Fernandes delivered a memorable portrayal of Romeo in Saib Rocha's tiatr production of Romeo & Juliet, earning praise from audiences. Subsequently, he captivated viewers once again with his performance in another tiatr, assuming the role of a character named "Souzalin." Such was his brilliance in this role that he became affectionately known by that name. Within Saib Rocha's company, Fernandes began to explore his talents as a playwright, penning his own tiatrs and translating English plays into Konkani. Driven by his enthusiasm and pursuit of perfection, Fernandes soon emerged as a popular writer, producer, and director in the theatrical realm. Any tiatr bearing his name was guaranteed to draw a capacity crowd, with audiences flocking to witness Fernandes's productions. With each new tiatr, Fernandes continually pushed the boundaries and delighted spectators with his innovative direction and stagecraft. Some likened him to American filmmaker Cecil B. DeMille of the Konkani stage, acknowledging his immense contribution and influence.

Fernandes's career boasts several achievements. He holds the distinction of being the first producer and director to stage three performances of the same tiatr on a single day, each show witnessing a sold-out audience. This feat was accomplished with his acclaimed tiatr Sam Francis Xavier (Saint Francis Xavier) which graced the stage of the Princess Theatre, Bhangwadi in Bombay on 25 November 1969. This accomplishment not only established a record within the Konkani tiatr community but also garnered attention throughout the broader theatrical landscape of Bombay and its surrounding areas. Throughout his career, Fernandes authored a repertoire of 40 tiatrs, including works such as Dream of Lisbon, Hem Assa Tem, Dadlo Vhodd Vo Ostori? (Is Man great or Woman?), Saibinnicheo Sat Dukhi (Seven Sorrows of Mary), Pai, Tujeach Tonddan Magon Ghetiem, Sad Aimorecho, Nimanneo Chear Vostu (The Last Four Things), Paichi Chuk vo Maichi? (Father's mistake or Mother's?), Patkanchem Dar (The Door of Sin), Dev Bapachi Dhu, Oxench Kelear Sudrot Goem, Sezarnik Ho Go Dodlacho, Rasna ani Jacob (Rasna and Jacob), Khotti Songot (Bad Company), Aum to Mapxenkar (It's me, hailing from Mapuça), Filomenanchem Sopon (Filomena's Dream), Xeutteak Polloun Justis, Deko Xett, Uska Aurot (Look Shett, his Woman), Conde de Monte Cruzo (Count of Monte Cruzo), Jesus ani Judas (Jesus and Judas), Pe. Agnel (Padre Agnel), Panch Mister Horkache (Five Glorious Mysteries), Bhag Juzechi Khorvont, Sam Francis Xavier, Sant Anton (Saint Anthony), Tiklem Cheddum (The girl born after three consecutive boys), and Assnoracho Kistulo?.

Fernandes gained recognition for his tiatr (a form of Goan musical theatre) titled Hem Asa Tem. This particular production achieved a milestone by being staged a total of 27 times at the Princess Theatre in Bombay. Fernandes holds the distinction of being the sole director to have accomplished such a feat with this tiatr at that specific venue. Fernandes's artistic endeavors primarily centered around religious themes, which resonated well with audiences. His tiatrs received widespread acceptance and popularity. One of the reasons behind their success was Fernandes's meticulous attention to detail in terms of casting and direction. He ensured that his productions featured the most popular actors and actresses on the Konkani stage, and he dedicated substantial time and effort to rehearsals and overall artistic direction. Initially, Fernandes limited his performances to Bombay. However, in January 1965, he embarked on a significant milestone by presenting his tiatr Saibinnicheo Sat Dukhi in Goa for the first time. This marked the beginning of Fernandes's growing influence and popularity in Goa. Later that same year, he staged Hem Asa Tem in Goa, further cementing his status as a highly sought-after director in the region. Saibinnicheo Sat Dukhi, featured in the Tiatrancho Jhelo, stands out as one of Fernandes's notable works. This religious drama explores the sufferings of the Virgin Mary and is known for its lyrical, mystical, and metaphorical language. The tiatr weaves together elements from biblical accounts, historical events, and fictional narratives, captivating audiences and providing them with a compelling and immersive dramatic experience, writes Goa University professor André Raphael Fernandes.

Fernandes's contributions extended beyond directing. He was known as an accomplished set designer, widely recognized for his skills in this area. In his quest for artistic growth, Fernandes attended performances of diverse theatrical traditions, including Marathi, Gujarati, and Parsi plays. This exposure allowed him to enhance his own stagecraft and incorporate new ideas into his productions. Another aspect of Fernandes's work was his specialization in singing female parts in songs. He possessed a talent for flawlessly mimicking female voices during duets. Many of Fernandes's songs were recorded and released by Gramophone Company India, with "Goeant Kitem Xizta, Tem Mapxeam, Ponnje Ravon Dista" emerging as a popular hit aired on All India Radio. Fernandes's influence extended beyond the stage. During his visits to Goa, he received support from the local community, resulting in sold-out shows wherever he performed. He played a pivotal role in introducing numerous actors and actresses to the Konkani stage, contributing to the growth and enrichment of the theatrical landscape. Fernandes played a significant part in launching the career of Alfred Rose, a singer-actor. In addition to his work in theatre, Fernandes showcased his acting skills in the Konkani film Nirmon (1966). He also embarked on tours with his troupe, performing in both Bombay and Goa.

== Personal life ==
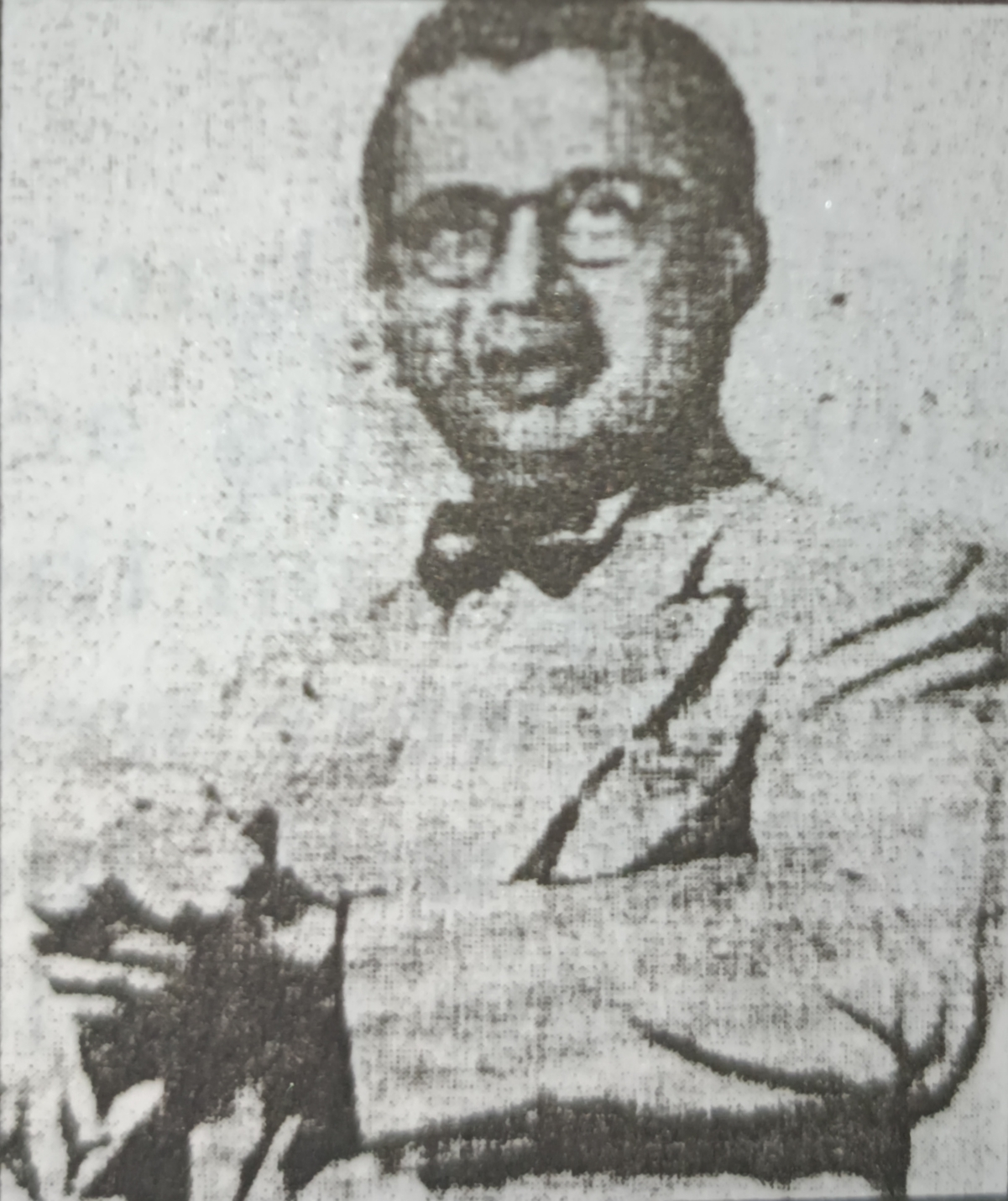
Fernandes during his youth

José Pascoal Fernandes was born on 22 March 1904, Calvim, Aldona, Goa, was then part of Portuguese India during the Portuguese Empire. He received his primary education in Portuguese at a local school and exhibited a keen interest in drama from a young age, organizing plays involving children. Fernandes experienced the early loss of his father, and his mother faced significant hardships while raising him. In pursuit of further education, Fernandes traveled to Karachi before eventually returning to Bombay. During his youth, he demonstrated resourcefulness by constructing makeshift stages using wooden benches and utilizing bed sheets as curtains for the performances he orchestrated. It was in Bombay that he seized an opportunity to showcase his talent as a tiatrist, a performer in the Konkani-language dramatic tradition, with Saib Rocha's Union Jack Dramatic Company.

On 18 July 1976, Fernandes died in Bombay, India. At the time of his death, he was in the midst of creating a new script entitled Misachi Bhett (Holy Mass).

== Legacy ==
The Municipal Corporation of Greater Mumbai have recognized Fernandes' contributions by dedicating a lane in Marine Lines as 'J. P. Souzalin Marg'. Furthermore, a road that leads to his hometown, Calvim in Aldona, Goa, has been named in his honor. Fernandes' well-received tiatr, Saibinnicheo Sat Dukhi, has been included in the publication Tiatrancho Jhelo Vol. 2 by the Goa Konkani Akademi.

== Filmography ==
Year	Title	Role	Notes	Ref
1966	Nirmon			

== Selected stage works ==
Year	Title	Role	Notes	Ref
1935	Romeo & Juliet	Romeo	Professional debut	
1930s/1940s	Untitled tiatr	Souzalin		
1965	Saibinnicheo Sat Dukhi	Writer/director		
1965	Hem Assa Tem	Writer/director		
1969	Sam Francis Xavier	Writer/producer/director		
	Dream of Lisbon	Writer/director		
	Dadlo Vhodd Vo Ostori?	Writer/director		
	Pai, Tujeach Tonddan Magon Ghetiem	Writer/director		
	Sad Aimorecho	Writer/director		
	Nimanneo Chear Vostu	Writer/director		
	Paichi Chuk vo Maichi?	Writer/director		
	Patkanchem Dar	Writer/director		
	Dev Bapachi Dhu	Writer/director		
	Oxench Kelear Sudrot Goem	Writer/director		
	Sezarnik Ho Go Dodlacho	Writer/director		
	Rasna ani Jacob	Writer/director		
	Khotti Songot	Writer/director		
	Aum to Mapxenkar	Writer/director		
	Filomenanchem Sopon	Writer/director		
	Xeutteak Polloun Justis	Writer/director		
	Deko Xett, Uska Aurot	Writer/director		
	Conde de Monte Cruzo	Writer/director		
	Jesus ani Judas	Writer/director		
	Pe. Agnel	Writer/director		
	Panch Mister Horkache	Writer/director		
	Bhag Juzechi Khorvont	Writer/director		
	Sant Anton	Writer/director		
	Tiklem Cheddum	Writer/director		
	Assnoracho Kistulo	Writer/director		
	Misachi Bhett	Writer	Final production; not completed	

== Select discography ==
- Goeant Kitem Xizta, Tem Mapxeam, Ponnje Ravon Dista
