= B. F. Cabral =

Pakistani writer and playwright (1885–1953)

- Born: Bernardo Francisco Cabral; 7 March 1885; Chimbel, Goa, Portuguese India
- Died: c.1953 (aged 67–68); Karachi, Dominion of Pakistan (possibly)
- Occupations: Writer; playwright; politician
- Years active: 1907–1938
- Known for: Editor of first Konkani newspaper; Founder of Catholic Sovostcai; Promotion of Konkani literature and Konkani tiatrs in British India
- Office: Mayor of Karachi (former)

Bernardo Francisco Cabral (7 March 1885 – c. 1953), known professionally as B. F. Cabral, was a Pakistani writer, playwright, and politician who served as the mayor of Karachi during British India. In the Konkani literary scene in Bombay, British India, as an emigrant, he served as the editor-in-chief of Sanjechem Noketr (1907), the first Konkani newspaper. He then went on to found his own publication, Catholic Sovostcai (1908), which had its short-term success before eventually turning to writing tiatrs staged during British India.

== Early life ==
Bernardo Francisco Cabral was born on 7 March 1885, in the island of Chimbel, Goa which was located in the Ilhas (now Tiswadi) region of the then Portuguese India during Portuguese Empire (now part of India). After completing his initial education at a parish school in his hometown, Cabral was sent at the age of nine to Bombay (now Mumbai), British India, where he finished his secondary education. As a young teenager and student, at the age of 14, Cabral commenced his literary endeavors by submitting written pieces to Konkani-language periodicals that encountered distribution challenges in Bombay during that era.

There is some scholarly debate around Cabral's exact place of origin, with a few sources identifying his hometown as the nearby town of Ribandar rather than Chimbel. However, the consensus among historians and literary researchers such as Wilson Mazarello and Michael Jude Gracias is that Cabral was born and raised in Chimbel, which maintained close ties to Ribandar. Cabral's early writings and journalism represented some of the first significant Konkani-language literary and media contributions from the Goan region during the late 19th and early 20th centuries. Beyond these details about his origins and early career, little is conclusively known about his later life.

== Career ==
Cabral was a leading Konkani writer and playwright who was most active during the period from 1910 to 1938. He was known for his versatility as an author, producing works that displayed a distinct, humorous style characterized by vivid, native imagery. It led to a significant increase in his standing and instilled an admiration for Konkani within the community. Cabral's writings were praised and appreciated by the reading public, helping to elevate the status of the Konkani language, which had previously been looked down upon by many. It was perceived that the language ought to be employed by those belonging to the lower socioeconomic strata. In 1907, Cabral was appointed as the editor of Sanjechem Noketr, the pioneering newspaper that was exclusively dedicated to publishing content in the Konkani language. According to accounts from his contemporaries, Cabral's literary output had a broad appeal, attracting the interest of Goan emigrants living in cities and regions beyond Portuguese Goa itself, including Bombay, Poona (both part of British India), Africa (then ruled by Western Europe), and the Persian Gulf countries (then part of Ottoman Empire).

Seeking to further expand the reach of Konkani literature, Cabral founded his own magazine, Catholic Sovostcai, in January 1908. A publication that was originally released on a monthly basis eventually transitioned to being published every two weeks. The magazine, published by Roldão Noronha, was especially popular among the wives of Goan emigrants, who eagerly anticipated each new issue. The same magazines were in high demand and quickly sold out as soon as they were made available for purchase. However, Cabral was forced to discontinue the magazine when he relocated to Delhi, British India, at which point he devoted more of his attention to writing tiatrs, a form of Konkani drama. Cabral later relocated to Karachi, British India, where he served in a professional capacity for the municipal council of the city. Throughout his career, he remained an influential figure in the Konkani literary landscape, contributing to the growing mainstream acceptance and appreciation of the Konkani language and culture.

Cabral was also a Konkani playwright and tiatrist who was active in the early 20th century. According to scholars Wilson Mazarello and Michael Jude Gracias, Cabral served as the Mayor of Karachi during British India, around the 1920s. He was a writer, producing several plays and dramas in the Konkani language during this period in Karachi, British India. Some of his most well-known works include: Gabruchi Sasumaim (1921): A 156-page comedy with 24 songs, Sat Pordheanim (1923): A comedic play consisting of 135 pages featuring 23 musical numbers throughout its duration, Senhor Gabriel (1923), Luvena (1925), and Inosent Hermione. In addition to these dramatic works, Cabral also composed two operas in verse: Jesus, Maria Anim Juze vo Jezu Christachem Gupit Jivit (Jesus, Mary and Joseph, a Secret Life of Jesus Christ), the theatrical performance took place in both Karachi and Goa, showcasing its artistry to audiences in different regions, Adanv Anim Eva vo Sorg (Adam and Eve, a Heaven), Sounsar Anim Deuchar (World and Devil), also performed in Karachi. Cabral's musical drama A Conquista de Goa vo Amchea Purvozancho Bavarth (The Conquest of Goa, Our Ancestors Faith) featured 43 songs and explored the Portuguese conquest of Goa and the spread of Christianity, though the date of publication for this work is unknown. Another of Cabral's plays, Minglu Balcheanv Ani Tachi Bail Picasany (Minguel Balchão and His Wife Picasany), this comedic publication, consisting of 106 pages, was authored by Bascora Suria Raut Dessai and was released in Pangim, Goa in 1938. Overall, Cabral made significant contributions to Konkani theater and literature during the early 20th century through his diverse body of dramatic and musical works.

The Konkani tiatr theatrical tradition flourished in British India, featuring popular performers and playwrights. Among the figures in this scene was Ambrose Carlisto Piedade Fernandes, known by his stage name A. M. B. Rose, a Goan actor and singer. Fernandes first encountered Cabral during the early stages of his own theater career in Karachi. At this time, Fernandes had made his debut as a theatre practitioner, writing, directing, and starring in his original production Comedy of Errors vo Gondoll Zoulleam Bhavancho, the theatrical production was showcased at the venue known as the Goa Portuguese Association Hall situated in the city of Karachi, British India. Cabral, recognizing Fernandes' skills, later asked him to supervise the direction of three tiatr plays authored by Cabral himself: Gabriel Balchao Ani Tachi Sasumaim, A Conquista de Goa, and Inosent Hermione. Fernandes acclaimed performances in these productions earned him recognition throughout Karachi. Cabral's theatrical productions were performed at The Palace Theater in Karachi, a venue known for hosting mainly European theater groups during that period. In addition to his dramatic work, Cabral had also published a Konkani-language periodical called Sanjechem Noketr (1907) from the city of Mumbai, then known as Bombay, which covered news and events from the region.

== Personal life ==
Cabral's details about his life and career are limited. Historical records indicate that an individual with a similar name to Cabral was married in 1928 in Goa. Specifically, marriage archives show that a person named Cabral wed Piedade Feliciana Alphonso, who was from Goa Velha. The civil marriage took place in Pangim, while the religious service was held in a church in Goa Velha. At the time of the marriage, this Cabral was employed, though it remains unclear if this individual was the same playwright. The sole substantial biographical information about Cabral appears in a 1953 book titled Tiatr 125th Comemeroative Volume, written by Fausto V. Da Costa. According to available sources, Cabral died either in Karachi or Bombay that same year. However, this represents the only known account of Cabral's death, and there is a lack of corroborating evidence from secondary sources to verify these details. Additionally, birth records mention a person with a similar name who died on 1 January 1937 in Goa Velha, but it is uncertain whether this refers to the same Cabral. Overall, concrete biographical information about Cabral remains limited due to the scarcity of available historical documentation.

=== Views on the Konkani language ===
Historical accounts indicate that Cabral openly shared his views on the Konkani language and its publishing environment during his active professional period. According to the 2016 book The History of the Book in South Asia by Italian scholar Francesca Orsini, Cabral discussed the financial difficulties encountered by authors and publishers of Konkani literature, stating that producing such works often led to financial deficits. He pointed out that the low demand for Konkani books was a key factor, as many readers preferred to borrow rather than buy these publications, contributing to the financial challenges faced by creators.
