= Thomas Coogan =

Indian composer and actor (1907–1957)

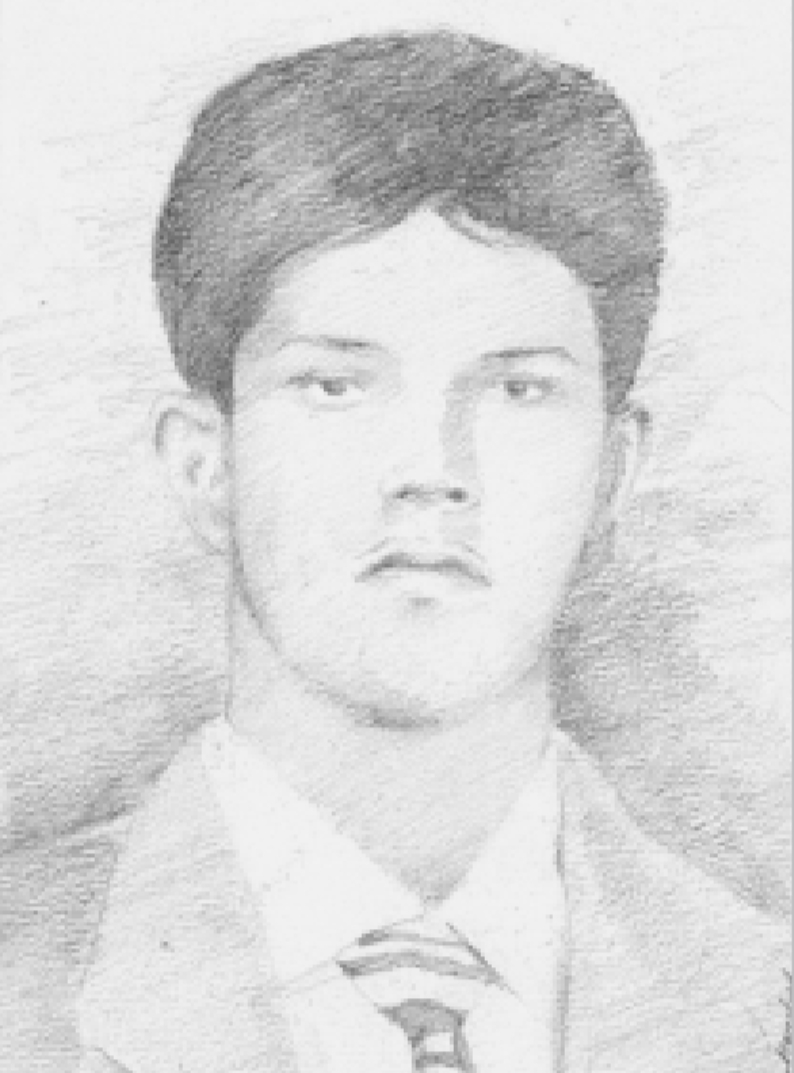
- Portrait of Fernandes during his youth
- Born: João Thomas Fernandes; 25 April 1907; Karachi, Bombay Presidency, British India (now Karachi, Sindh, Pakistan)
- Died: 1957 (aged 50); Bombay, Bombay State (now Mumbai, Maharashtra), India
- Occupations: Composer; singer; theatre actor; theatre director; playwright
- Years active: 1940s–1950s

João Thomas Fernandes (25 April 1907 – c. 1957), known professionally as Thomas Coogan, was an Indian composer, singer, theatre actor, theatre director, and playwright known for his work in tiatr productions from the 1940s to 1950.

== Career ==
Fernandes was a versatile performer in the domain of Goan entertainment, showcasing his talent as both a singer and an actor. His repertoire included a wide range of songs, encompassing both comic and serious compositions. In addition, he demonstrated his acting prowess by transitioning between decent and comic roles. Fernandes gained acclaim for his portrayal of a villainous character, a wicked negro in J. P. Souzalin's production of Conde de Monte Cruzo (Count of Monte Cruzo), a role that resonated with audiences and left a lasting impression. One significant event in Fernandes's career occurred during an exposition of the holy relics of St. Francis Xavier in Goa. A concert was organized at the Princess Theatre Bhangwadi in Bombay, where Fernandes's performance of his own composition, the song "Sant Francis Xavier", made an impact on the audience. This display of talent caught the attention of commercial directors at the time, further elevating Fernandes's reputation as a musician.

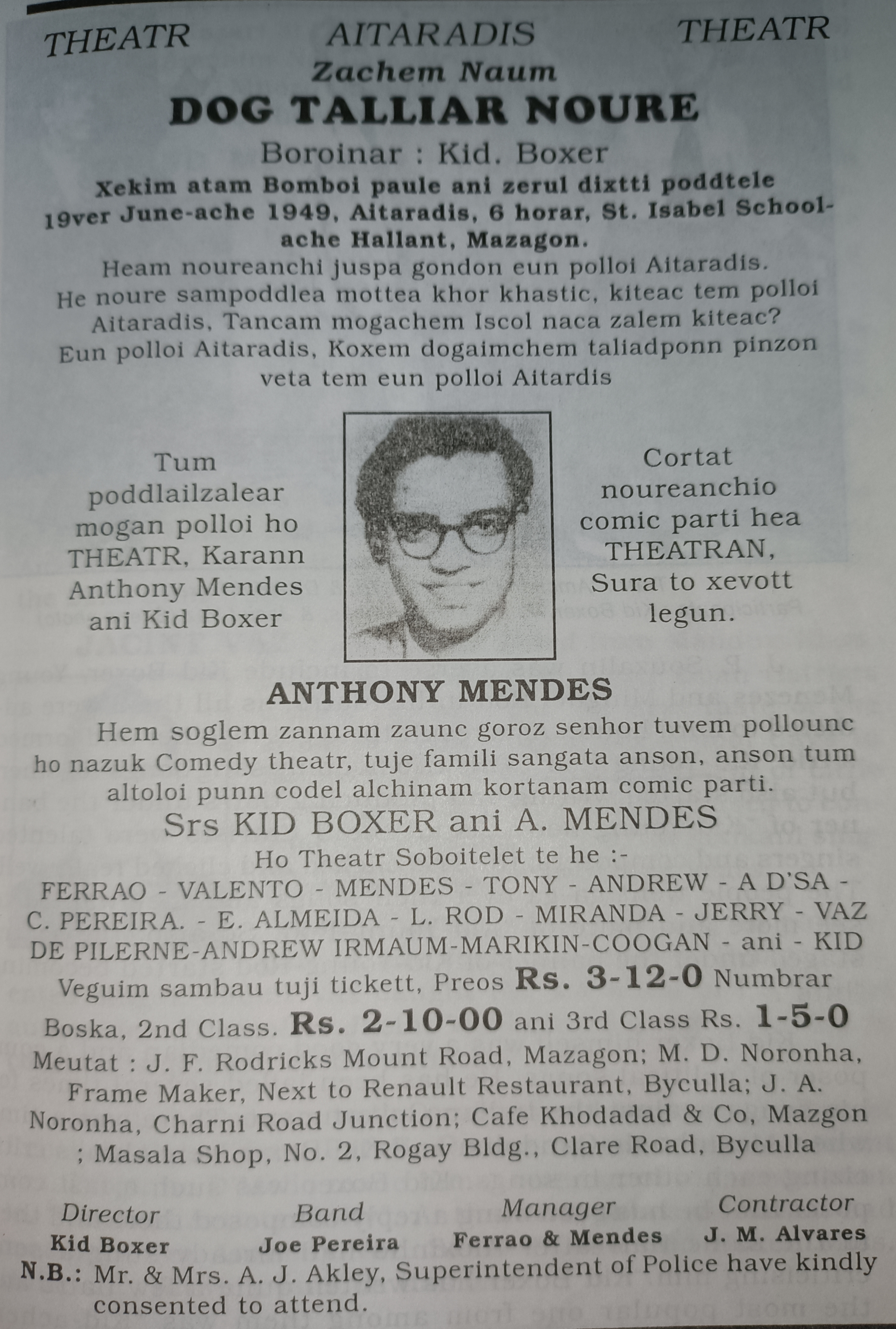
A handbill for Dog Talliar Noure, a tiatr written by the Konkani singer Kid Boxer, featuring Fernandes in the cast

Fernandes's creative contributions extended beyond his performances. As a composer, he crafted an extensive catalogue of songs and even ventured into writing and producing his own tiatrs. His ability to compose music relieved the burden on tiatr writers, as he often took on the responsibility of creating the majority, if not all, of the songs. Over the course of his lifetime, Fernandes composed numerous memorable pieces. Collaborating with his fellow villager, Jose Mendes, who was commonly known as Miss Ida on the tiatr stage, Fernandes formed a duo. Their performances together in approximately 20–25 tiatrs garnered widespread attention. These duets were recorded with Gramophone Company India and broadcast on All India Radio. Writer Michael Gracias writes, Fernandes's versatility as an actor was evident in his ability to portray a wide array of characters. From initially playing cameo roles, he gradually rose to become one of the leading and most versatile actors in the industry. Directors were eager to cast him in any role, be it as a romantic lead, a comedian, a hero, or even a villain. Fernandes also showcased his versatility through his portrayal of characters from various backgrounds, including Hindus and even wicked vampires.

Gracias further writes, during the golden era of tiatr, Fernandes's talent shone brightly. In those days, tiatr scripts were concise, often incorporating up to 25 songs. Fernandes lightened the load on writers by composing the majority, if not all, of the songs. Moreover, he directed and presented tiatrs that conveyed meaningful messages to audiences. During the inaugural performance of the tiatr Kombekar (Poultryman) by Jose Mendes, Fernandes collaborated with Selvyn and Konkani singer Alfred Rose. This marked Rose's debut in tiatr. Their rendition of the popular cantar (song) “Kiteak Jiv Khatai" was well-received by the audience. Fernandes's influence extended beyond his own career. He generously provided songs to Konkani singer and playwright Master Vaz, contributing to the latter's early success. As one of the prominent figures in Konkani tiatr during the first half of the 20th century, Fernandes played a pivotal role in upholding the rich tradition of Goan theater. His performances captivated audiences in both Bombay (now Mumbai) and Goa, leaving a mark on the history of tiatr.

== Personal life ==
João Thomas Fernandes, originally hailed from Calvim, Aldona, Goa, he was born on 25 April 1907 in Karachi, then a part of the Bombay Presidency in British India (now located in Sindh, Pakistan). During his early years, Fernandes had the opportunity to witness the silent films of Charlie Chaplin, featuring the American actor Jackie Coogan. Fernandes held a deep admiration for Coogan, leading him to adopt the stage name Thomas Coogan. Writer Michael Gracias attests that Fernandes exhibited talent early in his life. He excelled in the composition of songs, a skill he diligently refined with each passing day. Whether it was for festive occasions such as Christmas, New Year, Easter, or local celebrations, Fernandes consistently took part in concerts, captivating audiences with his repertoire of songs, encompassing both comedic and serious themes.

Fernandes composed the majority of these songs and generously shared his musical expertise with his fellow villagers. As he reached adulthood, he, like many others, left his hometown and journeyed to Bombay in search of better prospects. Gracias further writes, while engaged in various occupations to sustain himself, Fernandes remained unwavering in his commitment to the artistic passion that had been nurtured since his childhood. He died in 1957 at the age of 50, at his residence in Wadala, Bombay.

== Selected stage works ==
Year	Title	Role	Notes	Ref
1949	Dog Talliar Noure			
	Conde de Monte Cruzo	Wicked negro		
