= Miss Ida =

Goan theatre actor and singer

- Born: José Mendes; Calvim, Goa, Portuguese India, Portuguese Empire (now in India)
- Other name: Joseph Mendes
- Occupations: Actor; singer; playwright; female impersonator
- Known for: Kombekar (1938)

José Mendes, known professionally as Miss Ida, was an early 20th-century Goan theatre actor, singer, playwright, and female impersonator known for his work in tiatr productions during the early phase of tiatr. Described as a "celebrated female impersonator on the tiatr stage" by writer Fausto V. Da Costa, Mendes was among the pioneering cross-gender actors who was instrumental in preserving the vitality of the Konkani tiatr (theatre) during a time when there was a shortage of female performers.

Originating from the village of Calvim in Goa Mendes began his career in the Konkani "tiatr" stage where he started performed female roles. He later moved into singing duets with other Konkani artists and went on to collaborate with Thomas Coogan, forming a popular musical duo. Their work was featured in about 20–25 tiatrs. The duets they recorded were aired on All India Radio after being recorded on Gramophone Company India. Mendes also ventured into playwriting, with his tiatr Kombekar (Poultryman) gaining significant attention after its staging at Indra Bhavan, Dhobitalao in Bombay (now Mumbai) in 1938.

This production was known for providing opportunities to emerging Konkani tiatrists, including Carmo Valeriano Mascarenhas known professionally as Valente Mascarenhas and Alfred Rose (Rosario Alfred Fernandes), who made their debuts and showcased their talents. The trio of Selvyn, Thomas Coogan, and Alfred Rose delivered a popular performance of the song "Kiteak Jiv Khatai?" during the same tiatr, earning acclaim from the audience.

== Career ==
During the early years of the Konkani tiatr stage, women were absent from the performances, and the availability of female artists was limited. Consequently, male actors took on the roles of female characters. Mendes, among the male artists, demonstrated skill in portraying female roles and became known as a female impersonator on the tiatr stage. Mendes's performances were characterized by his ability to convincingly portray female characters, to the point where it was challenging to discern his true gender. Writer Irene Cardozo acknowledges Mendes and other male artists for their contribution to the tiatr tradition. Not only did they sustain the art form in the absence of female artists, but they also injected elegance and vitality into the performances, states Cardozo.

In addition to acting as female characters, Mendes engaged in singing duets with male co-artists. Writer Fausto V. da Costa commends Mendes as an early pioneer who adeptly assumed feminine roles. Tiatr enthusiasts bestowed applause and praise upon Mendes for his performances. He undertook female roles and vocalized songs in the persona of a female character. Mendes frequently collaborated with Thomas Coogan, a fellow Konkani composer and singer hailing from the village of Calvim, Aldona. Their partnership in approximately 20–25 tiatrs left an impression on audiences and formed an unforgettable combination, states da Costa. Several of their duets and duos have been captured by Gramophone Company India and aired on All India Radio (known as Akashvani).

Mendes's contributions to the tiatr extended beyond acting and singing. He penned several tiatrs, with their work Kombekar (Poultryman) generating a significant impact in Bombay during the British India era. The tiatr Kombekar was staged at Indra Bhavan in Dhobitalao, Bombay in 1938. It was within this production that Mendes provided a platform for the emerging Konkani actor and singer Valente Mascarenhas (Carmo Valerian Mascarenhas), who showcased his talent through five songs. Accompanying Mascarenhas were vocalists A. M. B. Rose, Alfred Rose, Thomas Coogan, and Selvyn. It was during the same tiatr that young Alfred Rose made his debut on the Konkani stage. The audience embraced the popular cantar "Kiteak Jiv Khatai?" performed by the trio of Selvyn, Thomas Coogan, and Alfred Rose.

== Personal life ==
Information about Mendes's personal life is scarce. He was born in the island village of Calvim, located in Aldona, Bardez, Goa, which was a territory of Portuguese India during the era of the Portuguese Empire (now part of India). He had a nephew named Joaquim Mendes, who was professionally known as Young Mendes and was also involved in the Konkani theater industry as an actor and playwright. It was Mendes himself who played a pivotal role in introducing Joaquim to the tiatr stage at a young age, and Joaquim's debut performance in tiatr turned out to be a success.

== Selected stage works ==
Year	Title	Role	Notes	Ref
	Kombekar	Writer		
