= A. M. B. Rose =

Indian actor and singer (1899–1982)

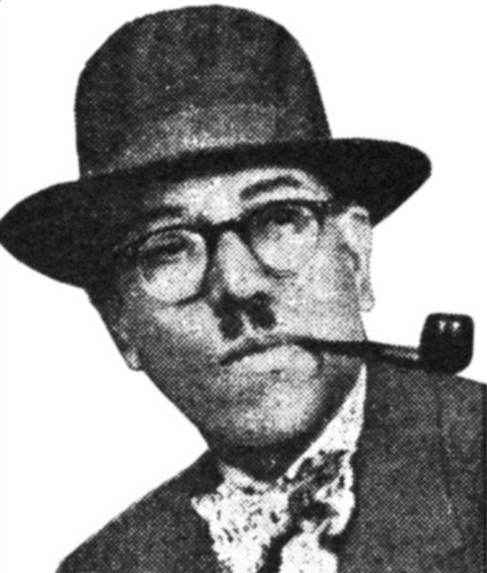
- Portrait of Fernandes during his youth
- Born: Ambrosio Calisto Piedade Fernandes; 31 July 1899; Calvim, Goa, Portuguese India, Portuguese Empire
- Died: 6 April 1982 (aged 82); Goa, India
- Other names: Daddy; Kantorist Rose
- Education: St. Patrick's High School, Karachi
- Occupations: Theatre actor; singer; director; playwright
- Years active: 1920s–c. 1954
- Title: Founder of Group of Goan Amateurs
- Spouse: Maria Fernandes (before 1927)
- Children: 3, including Alfred Rose
- Relatives: Rita Rose (daughter-in-law)

Ambrose Carlisto Piedade Fernandes (born Ambrosio Calisto Piedade Fernandes; 31 July 1899 – 6 April 1982) known professionally as A. M. B. Rose, was an Indian theatre actor, singer, theatre director, and playwright who worked on the Konkani stage. One of the early character actors of the Konkani tiatr stage, he gained fame during the golden phase of tiatr from the 1930s to 1970s. The patriarch of the 'Rose family', his son Alfred Rose followed in his footsteps to become a Konkani singer. Fernandes's family talents extended to his daughter-in-law Rita Rose, who made similar contributions to the Konkani stage like her husband Alfred, which inturn helped their children to become Konkani singers.

== Early life ==
Ambrosio Calisto Piedade Fernandes was born on 31 July 1899 in the island of Calvim, Goa, which was part of Portuguese India during the Portuguese Empire (now part of India) to Caetano Salvador Fernandes and Victoria Isabel Fernandes. He inherited his family's rich tradition of performance arts, particularly in acting and music, with his father Caetano being a respected figure in these realms. Born into a lineage of Konkani singers and writers, he hailed from a family with a musical background. His grandfather was celebrated for his proficiency in composing and arranging zagors in the Konkani language. During that period, Fernandes' father too played a significant role in the Konkani artistic community, gaining recognition for his work as a stage performer, composer, and coordinator of Konkani zagors. During his early years, Fernandes and his mother, Victoria, made a move to Karachi, British India, where his father was engaged in employment, further nurturing his exposure to diverse cultural influences.

Fernandes, also known as Kantorist Rose (transl. Singer Rose) during his formative years, was also a musician and vocalist and received his early education at St. Patrick's High School in Karachi, British India. This educational institution, administered by the Jesuit order, provided Fernandes with a comprehensive foundation in music, encompassing reading, writing, and vocal training, with an emphasis on solfeggio. Additionally, he had the privilege of studying the violin under the tutelage of popular violinists, attaining a mastery of the instrument. He had the unique opportunity to undergo musical training under the tutelage of distinguished musicians in Karachi during that period. Fernandes' musical talent did not go unnoticed by the Jesuit priests at St. Patrick's High School, who were impressed by his abilities. Recognizing his potential, they offered him a singular opportunity to showcase his vocal prowess in a school concert. Fernandes delivered a memorable performance that exceeded all expectations, demonstrating his musical abilities. He demonstrated a commitment to the trust and confidence bestowed upon him by his Jesuit superiors. As a result, his fellow students bestowed upon him the moniker "Kantorist Rose", acknowledging his talent as a singer. During this period, the Jesuit priests granted Fernandes a stage name that would accompany him throughout his career: A. M. B. Rose. Derived from his first name, the initials A. M. B. represented his individuality as a performer. Fernandes embraced this stage name with great reverence, and it became his professional identity, forever associated with his musical achievements.

== Career ==
In 1919, during the theatrical tour of Karachi, British India by Saib Rocha's Union Jack Dramatic Company, a Konkani tiatr titled Noketr Italia Xarachem (A Star from the city of Italy) captivated young Fernandes. This experience ignited Fernandes' desire to contribute to the tiatr tradition, leading him to embark on the creation of his own script, eventually resulting in the production of Comedy of Errors vo Gondoll Zunvlleam Bhavancho. With dedication, Fernandes crafted the script until its completion. The inaugural staging of Comedy of Errors vo Gondoll Zunvlleam Bhavancho took place at the Goa Portuguese Association Hall in Karachi. During his time as the Mayor of Karachi, B. F. Cabral, who originated from Chimbel-Ribandar in Goa (then part of Portuguese India during Portuguese Empire), attended a tiatr performance by Fernandes. Cabral was impressed by Fernandes' talents in acting, singing, and directing, leading him to invite Fernandes to direct three of his own tiatrs: Gabriel Balcheanv Ani Tachi Sasumaim (Gabriel Balcheao and his Mother-in-law), A Conquista de Goa (The Conquest of Goa), and Inocent Hermione.

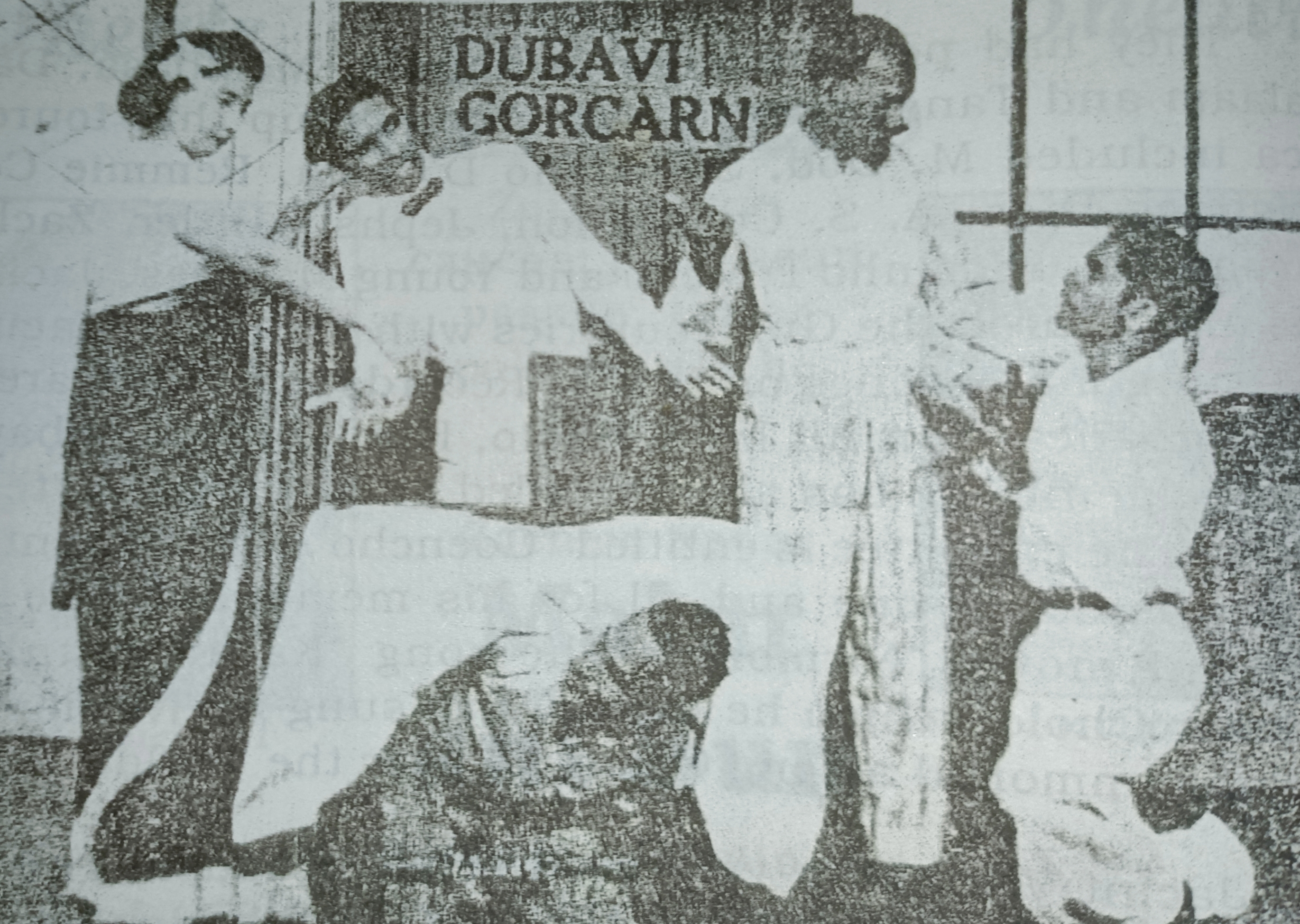
From left to right: Miss Carlota, Jacinto Vaz, Bartlu, Fernandes (extreme right), and C. Alvares, performing in the tiatr Dubavi Gorcarn

Fernandes' artistic prowess shone through in each of those tiatrs, earning him acclaim and establishing his reputation throughout Karachi. Fernandes made history by being the inaugural Goan artist to perform at The Palace Theatre in Karachi, a venue traditionally restricted to European theater troupes. Building upon his success, Fernandes continued to present a series of captivating tiatrs at the Zoroastrian Hall in Karachi. Fernandes' artistic accomplishments left an impact on the Goan community residing in Karachi, inspiring many individuals to pursue acting and singing. In order to foster this burgeoning interest, Fernandes founded the Group of Goan Amateurs, a collective of young Goan tiatrists, providing them with a platform to showcase their talents and contribute to the tiatr culture.

Fernandes served as a catalyst for the promotion and active participation of Goans in Karachi, British India in the realm of Konkani tiatrs. He played a pivotal role in fostering a deep affection for the Konkani language and Konkani tiatr performances among the community. As a founder of the Group of Goan Amateurs, Fernandes orchestrated and showcased several theatrical performances known as tiatrs under his banner. His final production, Cuslolo Visvo Xekddo, was staged in Karachi in 1929. In 1930, Fernandes left Karachi and returned to Aldona, Goa, his hometown. After a four-year stay in Goa, he relocated to Bombay, British India in 1934 to explore career opportunities. He initially worked at Shah & C. before securing a position at Nestlé, a Swiss company, where he remained until retiring. In 1937, it was in Bombay that Fernandes seized a significant opportunity to make his mark in the professional Konkani theater scene, debuting in J. P. Souzalin's tiatr production, Conde de Monte Cruz (The Count of Monte Cristo), which took place at the Princess Theatre in Bhangwadi, Bombay-widely regarded as the 'Mecca of tiatr' at that time. Fernandes's performance in Conde de Monte Cruz propelled him into the limelight, opening doors for him to collaborate with directors in the Konkani tiatr industry, including Aleixinho De Candolim, Saib Rocha, and other luminaries.

Fernandes was an influential figure in the realm of tiatr, a popular form of theatrical entertainment in Konkani-speaking regions. Known for his performances, Fernandes not only showcased his own skills but also generously shared his expertise, assisting other artists in refining their acting abilities. Acting in the tiatrs produced by Saib Rocha was a long-cherished aspiration that Fernandes fulfilled. In the tiatr Aga Kumpar by Alexinho De Candolim, Fernandes portrayed a daring character with precision, leaving an impression on the audience. J. P. Souzalin, recognizing Fernandes's talent and dedication, entrusted him with the role of a beggar in the tiatr Padr Agnel (Father Agnel). Impressed by his abilities, Souzalin later cast Fernandes as a heartbroken father in the production Hem Asa Tem (This is what is), which garnered significant fame and acclaim.

Fernandes was praised and recognized by both fans of tiatr (a type of musical theatre in Goa) and the media for his accomplishments. His contributions were not limited to performing; he also made achievements as a playwright. His tiatrs, namely Ghatkeponnacho Inam (Reward of Betrayal) and Jadu (Magic), were particularly memorable and well-regarded. As a character actor, Fernandes displayed meticulous attention to detail in his portrayals. His acute attention to detail in costume selection, makeup application, and voice modulation allowed him to authentically embody each character he depicted. Fernandes was part of a group of early tiatrists who actively participated in the theatrical productions of Pai Tiatrist, widely recognized as the pioneer of Konkani tiatr. During the golden era of tiatr from the 1930s to the 1970s, Fernandes stood out as one of the prominent and esteemed Konkani tiatrists of his time.

== Personal life ==
Fernandes entered into matrimony with Maria Anunciação Bernardina Fernandes, a homemaker originating from Colvale, Goa. While additional children may have been bom to the couple, certain birth records pertaining to their children may have been lost. According to the extant documentation, they had three children: two daughters named Alexandrina (born in 1929) and Emilia (born in 1926), as well as a son named Rosario Alfredo Fernandes, later recognized as Rosario Alfred Fernandes. In a continuation of the family's artistic legacy, Rosario followed in his father's footsteps as a popular Konkani singer, professionally known as Alfred Rose.

Rosario subsequently entered into wedlock with Rita Rose, a fellow Konkani singer and actress hailing from Bombay, British India. Fernandes' son Rosario's progeny, namely Schubert, Engelbert, and Alria, have each embraced musical careers within the Konkani domain. Revered by his peers in the tiatr community, Fernandes was endearingly referred to as "Daddy." Due to deteriorating health, he decided to permanently step away from performing on the Konkani tiatr stage, and retired to his ancestral residence in Aldona, Goa, at the age of 55. During his stay in Goa, he resided in his native village of Aldona. On 6 April 1982, Fernandes died in Goa at the age of 82.
