= Love in Goa =

1983 Indian Hindi film

- Directed by: Harsh Kohli
- Written by: V. P. Sathe
- Screenplay by: Harsh Kohli
- Produced by: Harsh Kohli
- Edited by: Rajeev Gupta
- Music by: Bappi Lahiri
- Release date: 22 April 1983
- Country: India
- Language: Hindi

Love in Goa is a 1983 Indian Hindi film, directed by Harsh Kohli. The film stars Ashok Kumar, Om Prakash, Mayur Verma and Anuradha Patel. The musical score of the film was done by Bappi Lahiri.

== Plot ==
The film revolves around the teenage love story of a Catholic girl from Goa and a Hindu boy.

== Cast ==
- Ashok Kumar as Baburao
- Om Prakash as Vinayak Rao
- Mayur Verma as Raja "Raju"
- Jagdeep as Pankaj (Raju's Fan)
- Anuradha Patel as Marina D'Souza
- Om Shivpuri as Jack D'Souza
- Mohan Sherry as Marshall Lobo
- Gajanan Jagirdar as Mr. D'Souza
- Ashalata Wabgaonkar as Mary D'Souza
- Raju Shrestha as Tiktik D'Souza
- Titta Pretto as Comedian

== Soundtrack ==
The lyrics were penned by Anjaan and the songs were composed by Bappi Lahiri and Alfred Rose. The song "Come On Sing" was lyrics and music by Alfred Rose.

Song	Singer
"Love In Goa"	Bappi Lahiri
"Fever, It's A Love Fever"	Bappi Lahiri, Usha Uthup
"Sab Kehte Hain Mujhko Deewana"	Amit Kumar
"Ek Ladka, Ek Ladki Se Jab Milta Hai Bandh Kamre Mein"	Amit Kumar, Asha Bhosle
"Na Jane Tune Kya Kaha, Na Jane Maine Kya Suna" (Happy)	Amit Kumar, Asha Bhosle
"Na Jane Tune Kya Kaha, Na Jane Maine Kya Suna" (Sad)	Amit Kumar, Asha Bhosle
"Come On Sing"	Alfred Rose
