= Rita Rose =

Indian singer and actress (born 1947)

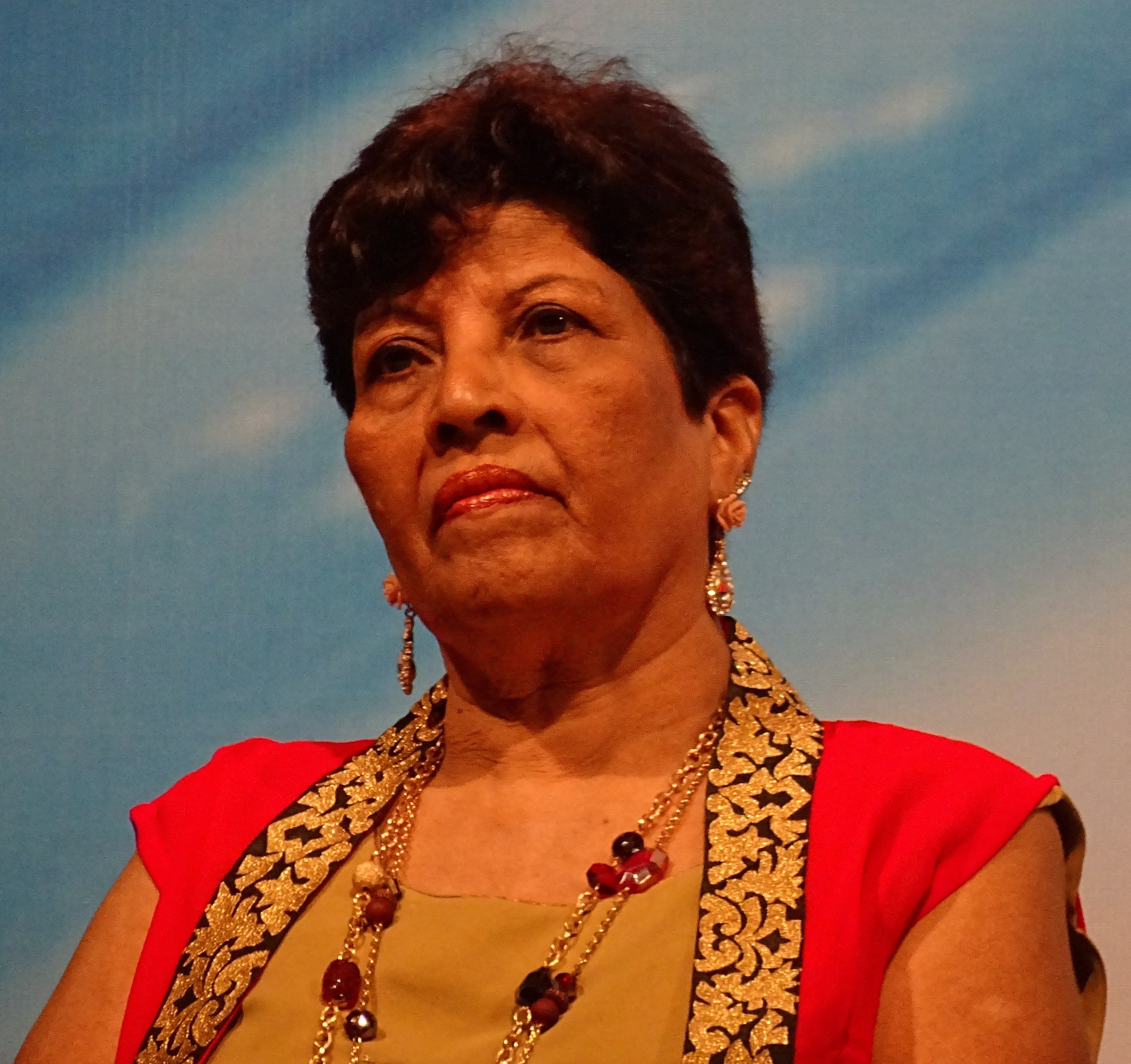
- Rose at the Kala Academy, 2015
- Born: Maria Rita Pais; 7 September 1947 (age 78); Bombay, Bombay Presidency, Dominion of India
- Occupations: Singer; actress
- Years active: 1962–present
- Spouse: Alfred Rose (m. 1965; died 2003)
- Children: 3
- Relatives: A. M. B. Rose (father-in-law)
- Website: ritarose.in

Maria Rita Fernandes (née Pais; born 7 September 1947), known professionally as Rita Rose, is an Indian singer and actress known for her work in Konkani films and tiatr productions. A solo and duet singer, she first gained prominence during the mid-1960s performing in her husband Alfred Rose's tiatrs. She is also best known for her leading role in the Konkani film Boglantt (1975).

== Early life ==
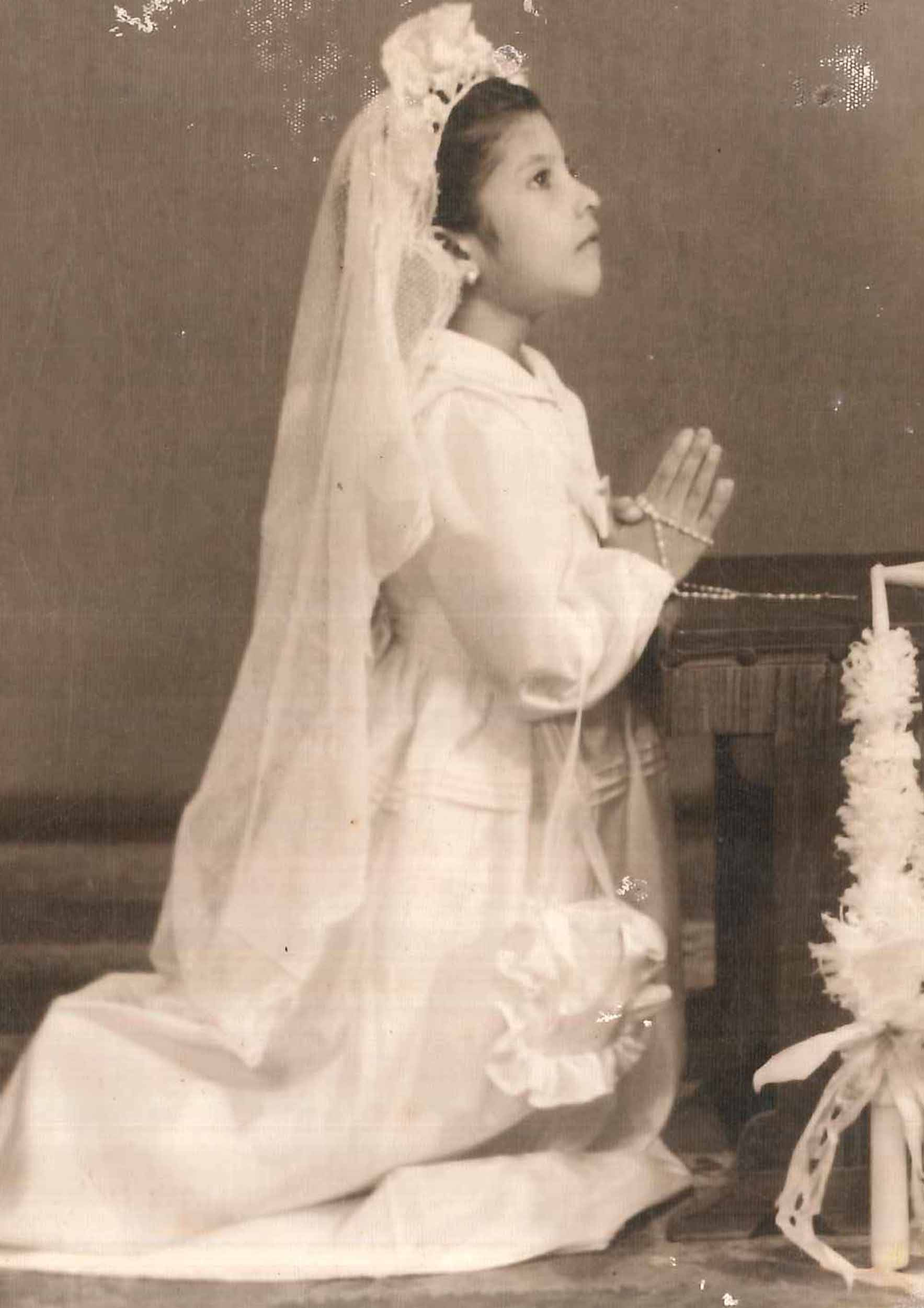
Rose during her First Communion in c. 1955

Her father was also an artist, a Konkani playwright, and a theatre director who wrote two famous tiatrs, Sosnnikai and Gharachi Chavi (House Key).

== Career ==
Rose began participating in tiatr productions through her involvement in Munis Ou Devchar (Human or Demon?), a theatrical production created by her husband, Alfred Rose. Initially, there was a shortage of performers, prompting Alfred Rose to request her father for her participation. At the time, Rita was an unmarried school student. Consequently, she joined Jessie Dias and Alfred Rose himself as part of a trio performance. Throughout her career, she has considered her most memorable role to be in M. Boyer's tiatr, Ekuch Rosto (Only One Way), which was specifically tailored to suit her talents. However, when Boyer sought to record the tiatr production, Rose was unable to participate due to her commitment to a show in London. Another actor assumed her role in Ekuch Rosto during her absence. Boyer opted not to record the production, as he believed Rose, the original cast member, was the most fitting actor for the role.

One of the popular songs performed by Rose and her husband was "Bomboichi Birmoti." Additionally, she lent her vocal talents to various audio cassettes for artists such as H. Britton, Titta Pretto, and Hortencio Pereira. Following her marriage to Alfred Rose, she featured in all of his tiatr productions. However, prior to their union, she was unable to participate due to her commitment to schooling. During that time, actors like Jessie Dias and Antonette Mendes took on roles in her husband's productions. As of 2012, Rose had acted in several popular tiatrs, including Lakpoti Novro (Millionaire Boyfriend), Director Saib (Director Sir), and Ekuch Rosto (Only One Way). Alongside her acting career, Rose also showcased her singing abilities in tiatrs such as Angounnechi Vokol, Somestancho Kumpar, and Dharun Vhoddil.

Author Wilson Mazarello writes, "Fernandes has a very pleasant voice and can sing solos as well as duets with equal ease". Her vocal talents received recognition for their quality, enabling her to perform both solo and duet pieces. Collaborating with her husband, Alfred Rose, she gained international fame, particularly among the Goan diaspora. Her contributions to the world of Konkani theater, working alongside directors like M. Boyer, Prem Kumar, C. Alvares, and her husband Rose, have showcased her versatility as an actress. In addition to her theater performances, she has achieved acclaim as the leading actress in the Konkani film Boglantt (1975), which resonated with the Goan community. Her talent has taken her on several tours, across the United Kingdom, Canada, the Middle East, and other locations. She has also established a presence in the realm of broadcast media. Since 1995, she has been a regular singer on All India Radio and Doordarshan. Recognizing her contributions to the cultural heritage of Goa, Rose granted permission to Isidore Dantas, the former Assistant General Manager of the State Bank of India, to write a book about her husband, Alfred Rose. Displaying her meticulous nature, Rose systematically documented her experiences, including handbills, photographs, and cassette tapes, which she donated to the Goa Central Library in Panjim. In the 2019 book Alfred Rose: The King of Melody by Dantas, she authored a section spanning four pages following an extensive period of over two years dedicated to research and compilation for the publication.

In May 2016, Rose and her son Englebert delivered a live tribute to Alfred Rose during the Goa Food and Music Festival organized by the Herald Group. The festival, held over three days at the Campal Parade Ground in Panjim, showcased a diverse range of performances by artists such as Anselm Fernandes, Frazier, Aleta Gonsalves, Pearl, True Blue, Media Waves, Divya Naik, Vito, A-Unit, and Ciloni Da Costa.

On 17 April 2017, Rose actively participated in a commemorative event held at the DMK auditorium in the Kala Academy, Panjim, celebrating the 125th anniversary of tiatr, a form of Konkani theater. Konkani tiatrists, including Antonette Mendes, Betty Naz, Titta Pretto, Joe Rose, Ben Evangelisto, Roseferns, Prince Jacob, Comedian Agostinho, Comedian Selvy, Comedian Domnic, Luis Bachchan, Mario Menezes, Alfy de Divar, and others, also contributed to the presentation.

On 15 August 2020, Rose, accompanied by her children Alria and Engelbert, captivated audiences with an online concert hosted by Rockin' Marmalade. The concert named Goan Global 2 was first showcased on their official Facebook page, marking a significant moment as Rose and her children reunited on stage after a decade. Their performance highlighted the songs of Alfred Rose. During the concert, Tatum D'Souza, the daughter of Bab Peter and Ophelia Cabral, also made an appearance and captivated the audience with performances of their well-known songs.

In August 2022, Rose received recognition for her and her husband's contributions to the realms of music and literature during a literary program. The event coincided with the release of the book The Rose Blooms, written by Glenis Mendonça, a lecturer at Carmel College, Nuvem. Rose, together with her daughter Alria and son Engelbert, entertained the audience with their performance. The program also commemorated the 90th birth anniversary of the Konkani singer Alfred Rose.

== Personal life ==
Rita had an encounter with Alfred Rose, her future husband, during her involvement in her father's tiatr production titled Gharachi Chavi (House Key). A teen aged Rita found herself sharing the stage with Alfred, who played opposite her. During this time, she had the opportunity to handle Rose's wand and his Panama hat, an accessory he utilized during his singing performances. Amidst the preparations for their show, she unintentionally crumpled Rose's imported Panama hat from London when she sat on it, marking their initial introduction. This incident caused consternation for her mother, who was deeply concerned about her daughter's behavior.

In an attempt to make amends, she offered to compensate Rose for the damaged hat. However, Rose responded with equanimity, smiling and accepting the situation without complaint. On the occasion of her 18th birthday, she and Alfred Rose, who was 32 years old at the time, tied the knot on 7 September 1965, at the Holy Name Cathedral in Colaba, Bombay. The union resulted in the birth of three children: two sons named Schubert and Engelbert, and a daughter named Alria. All three children actively participate in the Konkani stage, carrying on their parents' artistic legacy.

Following her marriage, Rose acknowledges that her husband held a strong affection for the Konkani language and even took the initiative to teach it to their family members. However, Rose primarily conversed with her children in English to ensure their familiarity with both languages. In regards to Glenis Mendonça, the author of The Rose Blooms, Rose regards her as a "prolific writer". Collaboratively, Mendonça and Rose authored a book centered around the life and accomplishments of Alfred Rose. Rose further emphasizes that her husband did not receive recognition during his lifetime, emphasizing the importance of appreciating individuals while they are still alive. On 21 October 2003, Rose's husband died in Mahim, Mumbai at the age of 71. As of 2012, Rose and her family continue to reside in Mahim.

=== The lost suitcase incident ===
In 1987, a musical event took place at Shanmukhananda Hall in Sion, Bombay. The show featured popular English and Konkani bands, including Rose's band. Rose and her husband, Alfred Rose, had intended to attend the show with their car, carrying a suitcase containing their belongings. Meanwhile, their friends and younger son, Schubert, were en route to the venue in a taxi with another suitcase belonging to her. However, upon their arrival at the hall, they realized that they had inadvertently left the second suitcase in the taxi. Realizing the predicament, Alfred instructed their photographer to take her back home in a taxi, where she could retrieve new clothes, wigs, and other necessary items. She promptly took the taxi and managed to make it to the venue. However, the lost suitcase contained only musical notes, specifically solfas, which were crucial for their performance. Without these notes, it would have been impossible for them to participate in the musical show.

Not wanting to disappoint the audience, Alfred made an announcement, explaining the situation to the crowd. Despite being already 30 minutes late, the audience remained patient and understanding. In the meantime, Rose contacted Babush, who had written all the songs as per Alfred's instructions. With Babush's assistance, they managed to salvage the show, and it turned out to be a success. Following the performance, Rose, her family, husband, and friends celebrated at their residence. To their surprise, the taxi driver arrived at their home with the lost suitcase. In gratitude for his honesty, Rose and her family wished to reward the driver with some money. However, the taxi driver declined their offer, displaying his integrity and refusing any form of compensation.
