= Titta Pretto =

Indian comedian and singer (1933–2026)

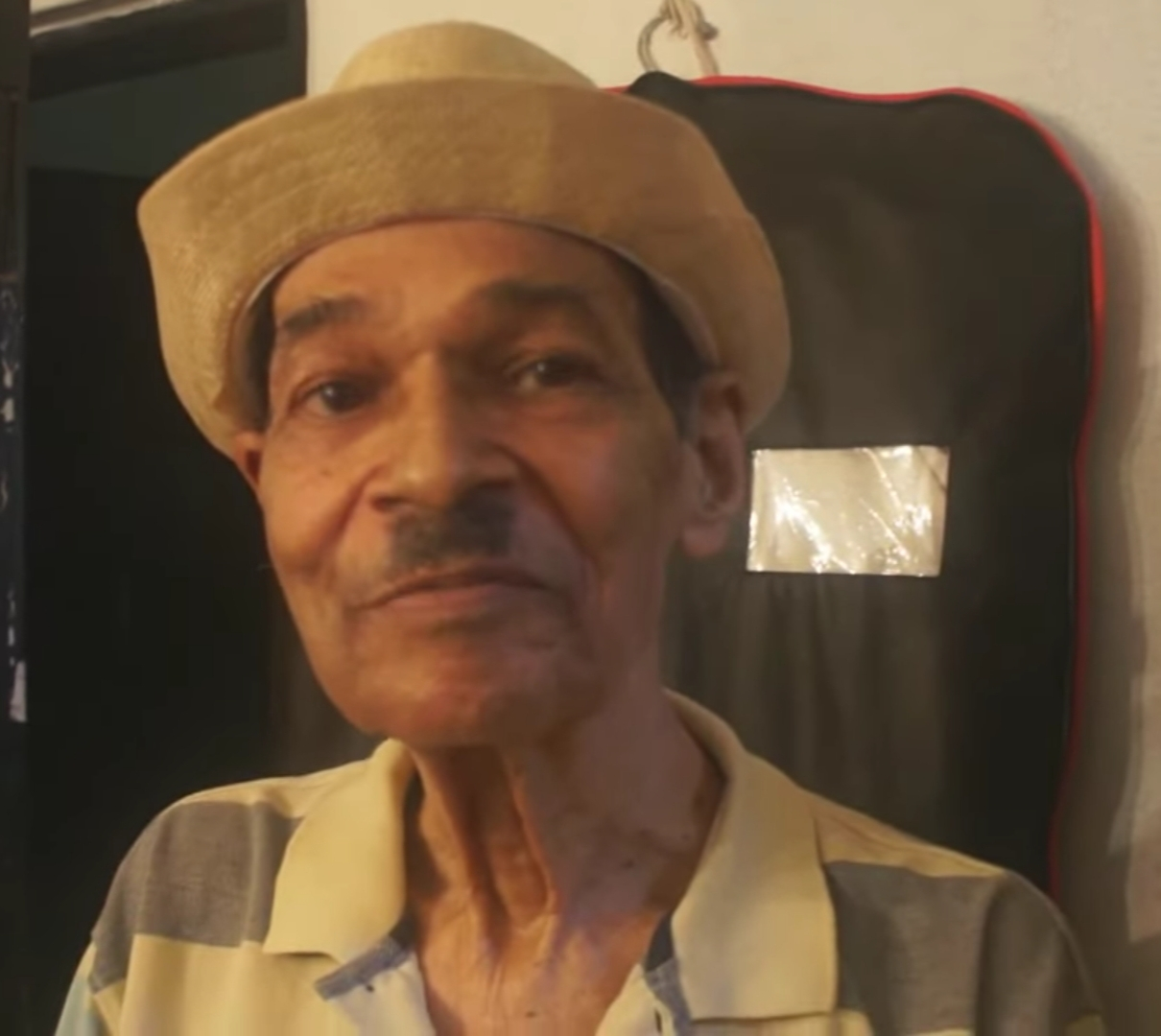
- Preto in 2023
- Born: Tito Matias Estefânio Preto; 4 January 1933; Aldona, Goa, Portuguese India
- Died: 9 June 2026 (aged 93)
- Occupations: Comedian; singer; composer; playwright
- Years active: c. 1949–2020s
- Notable work: Amchem Noxib (1963); Nirmon (1966); Love in Goa (1983)

Tito Matias Estefânio Preto (4 January 1933 – 9 June 2026), known professionally as Titta Pretto, was an Indian comedian, singer, composer and playwright known for his work in Konkani films and tiatr productions.

== Early life ==
During his formative years, Preto developed a deep appreciation for tiatrs, a traditional form of Goan musical theater. Among the tiatrists, he admired the Konkani tiatrist Minguel Rod for his singing prowess and skill in composing tiatrs. Inspired by his idol, Preto often imitated Minguel Rod's style, nurturing his ambition to become a tiatrist of similar stature. Gradually, Preto began crafting his own compositions, predominantly in the realm of comedic tiatrs.

At the age of 16, Preto relocated to Bombay (now Mumbai) and established permanent residence there. His father served in the Goa Police and later assumed the role of a Rejidor (now referred to as Sarpanch) in Goa. Preto also fostered a close association with J. P. Souzalin, a prominent tiatrist. In Bombay, Preto undertook various employments, including positions at establishments like the Royal Bombay Yacht Club and Ritz Hotel. Accumulating savings from his endeavors, he resolved to pursue his lifelong passion for tiatrs and aspire to become a distinguished tiatrist in his own right.

== Career ==
Preto embarked in the realm of Konkani theatre with his debut performance in 1949. His inaugural appearance took place in the tiatr production Chikott Pakott by A. M. Bengalu, where he portrayed the role of a comedian. This marked the beginning of a career that spanned over seven decades. Throughout his extensive tenure, Preto's commitment and artistic pursuits propelled him forward. His stage presence extended beyond conventional boundaries, as he embraced diverse roles, including those of female characters. Additionally, he demonstrated his musical prowess by composing and performing Konkani songs, earning acclaim for his solo works such as "Mogan Poddon," "Santak Korta Rozar," "Don't Worry Be Happy," and "Goa Amcho Ganv." His duets, including "Ragdda Pettis" and "Passport," further underscored his versatility as an artist.

Preto's contributions to the Konkani theater scene extended beyond his individual performances. He played a pivotal role in staging khell tiatrs, a traditional form of folk theater, in Bombay. Together with his troupe, he traversed various regions, showcasing their tiatrs in cities such as Belgaum, Sawantwadi, Calcutta, Poona, Bombay, Nashik, and Ahmedabad. Preto's artistic endeavors were not confined solely to the stage. He ventured into the realm of cinema, leaving a mark with his appearances in Konkani films like Amchem Noxib, Nirmonn, Boglantt, Kortubancho Sonvsar, and Girestkai. Furthermore, he made a foray into the Hindi film industry, featuring in the film Love in Goa in 1983. Additionally, Preto showcased his entrepreneurial spirit by producing three audio cassettes: Retired Tarvotti, Don't Worry Be Happy, and Goa Amcho Ganv. Moreover, he released a Konkani video CD titled Toxench Guneanvkari Konn?, which garnered attention in the market. Preto's contributions to the Konkani stage were duly recognized. Konkani playwright John Claro bestowed upon him the honorary title of the "Vasco da Gama of the Konkani stage." This accolade acknowledged Preto's extensive national presence and his ability to stage tiatrs in diverse locations throughout the country.

Wilson Mazarello, a historian and singer in the Konkani community, has provided insights into the early career of Preto. According to Mazarello's scholarly work, Preto initially made his mark on the Konkani stage during a tiatr performance by Frank de Santacruz. It was during this tiatr that Preto was given the opportunity to showcase his singing talent, as his physical resemblance to the Konkani comedian, Anthony Mendes, led to him being dressed as Mendes. The striking resemblance between the two made it challenging to differentiate between them. Preto, during his leisure time, engaged in writing tiatrs, but he hesitated to share them with others. However, he eventually mustered the courage to stage his own tiatr, Disgrass, at Cama Hall, Bombay. To ensure the success of his production, Preto enlisted the participation of accomplished actors from Goa, including Minguel Rod, Kid-Young-Rod (Kid Boxer, Young Menezes and Minguel Rod), Diago Cardozo, and Andrew Fernandes. Minguel Rod was entrusted with the responsibility of directing the tiatr. Disgrass was performed at multiple venues, including Cama Hall, Warden Road, Kalyan Railway Hall, and Juhu Koliwada. The positive response to these shows encouraged Preto to pursue acting opportunities in tiatrs directed by others.

In 1952, Preto achieved a significant milestone in his career when he acted in his own written and Minguel Rod-directed tiatr, Disgrass, which was staged thirteen times. This production catapulted Preto into the ranks of professional tiatrists. Subsequently, he became a sought-after actor for Konkani directors such as J. P. Souzalin, Jacinto Vaz, Saib Rocha, C. Alvares, Prem Kumar, Remmie Colaço, M. Boyer, Alfred Rose, Kid Boxer, Minguel Rod, Rico Rod, Ophelia, and Bab Peter. Preto's contributions extended beyond acting, as he showcased his vocal abilities by performing solo as well as duet songs in numerous tiatrs.

In January 1961, Preto made history by organizing the first-ever tiatr called Mogak Lagon (Because of Love) in Delhi. He further expanded his organizing skills by staging another tiatr, Bomboikarachi Bail (The Woman from Bombay), in Belgaum. This experience propelled Preto into becoming a contractor for other directors, independently as well as in collaboration with groups like the Syndicate. He played a pivotal role in contracting a substantial number of khell tiatrs and non-stop shows in Bombay, which were produced by writers and directors from Goa. Preto's comedic prowess endeared him to audiences, leading to a multitude of comedy roles being offered to him by directors. However, he also demonstrated his versatility by portraying character roles in numerous tiatrs. Preto's creative talents extended beyond acting and singing, as he also wrote and directed his own tiatrs. Some examples of his work include Soitanachi Tainni (The Temptation of Truth), Mogak Lagon, Xevott Kirmidoracho (The End of Criminals), Disgrass, and Atanchim Kazaram (The Marriages of Today).

== Personal life ==
Preto was a nearby resident of Alfred Rose and, as documented in the book 100 Years of Konkani Tiatro published in 2000, he and his family made their home in Mahim, Mumbai.

=== Abu Dhabi incident ===
During his career, Preto encountered several incidents while participating in tiatr performances. One such incident took place in Abu Dhabi during C. Alvares' tiatr production titled Honrad Goenkar. As the show was about to commence, Preto received an urgent call and rushed towards the source, inadvertently entering a concealed hole on the darkened stage. Falling a considerable distance, he found himself trapped below the stage, unable to be heard by the audience above. Despite Preto's pleas for help, the spectators grew impatient and urged the performers to proceed with the show. Unbeknownst to them, another individual, drawn by the sound of Preto's clapping, also fell into the same hole while attempting to locate him. A third person who joined the search suffered a similar fate. Eventually, all three were rescued from the depths of the hole, but not without sustaining physical injuries and damaging their wristwatches during the fall. The incident prompted the organizers to cancel the tiatr performance and conduct a thorough inspection. As a gesture of goodwill, new watches were presented to all the tiatr artists involved.

=== Petromax lamp incident ===
In another incident, Alfred Rose staged his tiatr production called Dotor Advogad (Doctor Advocate) in the village of Raia, Goa, near the Church. This particular performance stood out as it marked the transition from a traditional wooden stage to a modern metal stage. Given the absence of electricity during those early years, the tiatr relied on petromax lamps for stage lighting. However, an incident occurred during the show when one of the petromax lamps exploded. Swift reflexes allowed Preto to avoid the flames by quickly evading them. However, his fellow troupe member, Rico Rod, was not as fortunate and suffered burns, prompting him to vigorously attempt to extinguish the fire on his person. Aristides Dias, a Konkani playwright, displayed bravery and resourcefulness by swiftly intervening and smothering the flames with his own shirt, effectively preventing further harm.

=== Death ===
On 9 June 2026, Preto died at the age of 93.

== Selected stage works ==
Year	Title	Role	Notes	Ref
	Untitled tiatr	Singer		
1949	Chikott Pakott	Comedian	Professional debut	
1950	Atanchim Kazaram	Director	Debut as director	
1952	Disgrass	Actor/writer	Debut as writer	
1961	Mogak Lagon	Director		
	Bomboikarachi Bail	Director		
1950s	Soitanachi Tainnim	Director		
1950s	Kirmidoracho Xevott	Director		
