= Ponte Conde de Linhares =

Count of Linhares Bridge Ponte Conde de Linhares
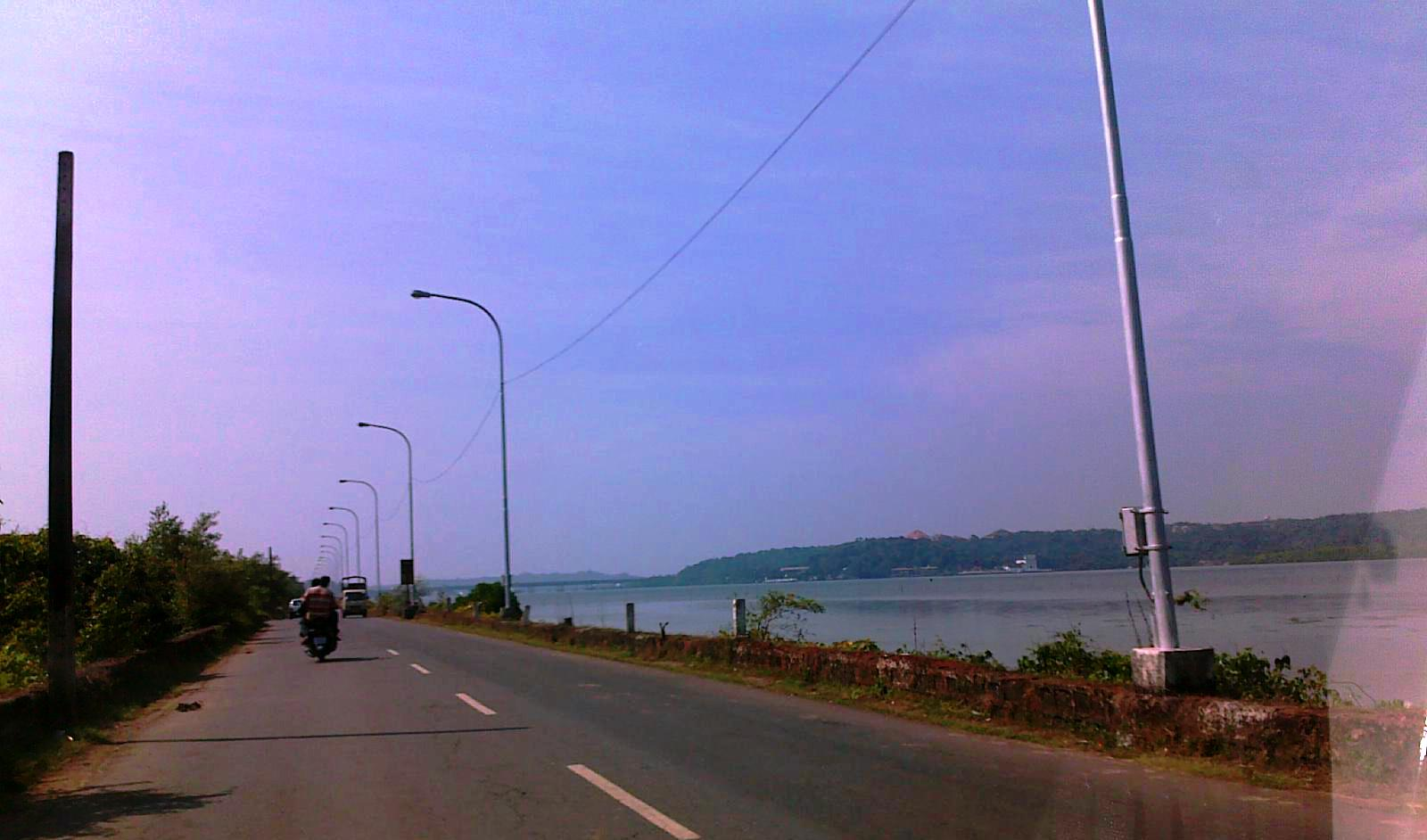
- Ribandar Causeway
- Coordinates: 15°30′5″N 73°50′54″E
- Carries: Motor vehicles
- Locale: Ilhas, Goa, India
- Other name(s): Ponte de Linhares; Ribandar causeway Patto causeway
- Maintained by: Goa Public Works Department

Characteristics
- Total length: 3.2 km (2 mi)

History
- Construction start: c. 1633
- Construction end: c. 1634

Location
- Interactive map of Count of Linhares Bridge

The Ponte Conde de Linhares (English: Count of Linhares Bridge), often shortened to Ponte de Linhares is a 3.2 km (2.0 mi) long causeway connecting Ribandar to the main city of Panjim (now Panaji) in Goa, India. It runs along the flood plains of the Mandovi River and is surrounded by various salt pans. There are ducts which act as tide controls. The Ponte Conde de Linhares was built in 1633–34 under the direction of the then Viceroy of Portuguese India, Miguel de Noronha, 4th Count of Linhares, after whom it is named. The bridge is often said to have been the longest in the world at 3.2 km (2.0 mi) when it was completed in 1634.

The 2014 edition of the Panaji Carnival started at Ribandar-Merces Junction on the causeway.

== Construction ==
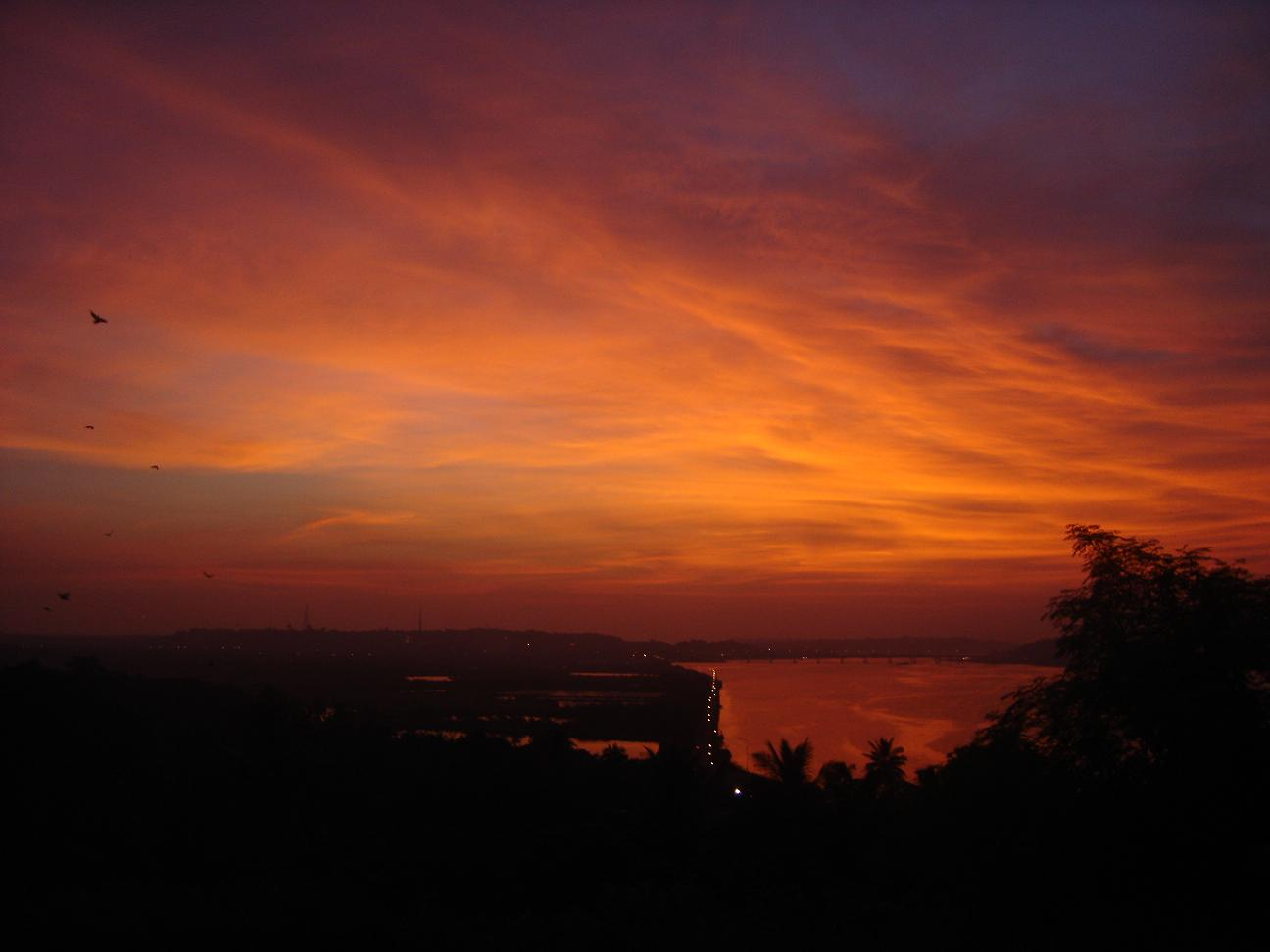
View of Ponte Conde de Linhares along the Mandovi River at dusk

The original structure of the bridge was designed and built by the Jesuits of the College of St. Paul in Old Goa. It was built on alluvial soil and stabilised with the trunk of the iliadola briformis, a tree called Benth, locally known as Zambo. Laterite stone was used in the construction of the bridge superstructure. It was built to handle the load of horse drawn carriages of its time but has handled the load of heavy motor vehicles since then.

The causeway is supported by three arches on the eastern side, while thirty-eight arches support it on the western side. It was built at a cost of £3,333. A local tradition states that the bridge was built by the Jesuits in a single night using the light of a single lamp. On 22 June 1634, the bridge, as well as the surrounding land was handed over to the municipal chamber of the city for its maintenance and upkeep.

== Damage ==
In 1980s, planting of Mangrove trees on the southern bank of the river was undertaken by the forestry department to prevent erosion of the bridge.

The bridge had been damaged due to continuous tidal motion in 2011 and 2014. To prevent it from further damage, construction of a protective wall was initiated by the Goa Public Works Department.

In order to prevent further damage, the Public Works Department diverted the movement of heavy vehicles from Panaji to Old Goa. Speed restrictions were imposed to slow down vehicles, with plans to further enforce them with the installation of traffic cameras.

== Tourism ==
In 2014, the Government of Goa proposed to build a parallel bridge for traffic and add attractions such as food stalls and toy trains for tourists on the existing structure. The state government sought funds from the Government of India to beautify the causeway as well as put up a proposal for a bridge parallel to the causeway which could be used as a marina.
