= Ribandar =

- Town
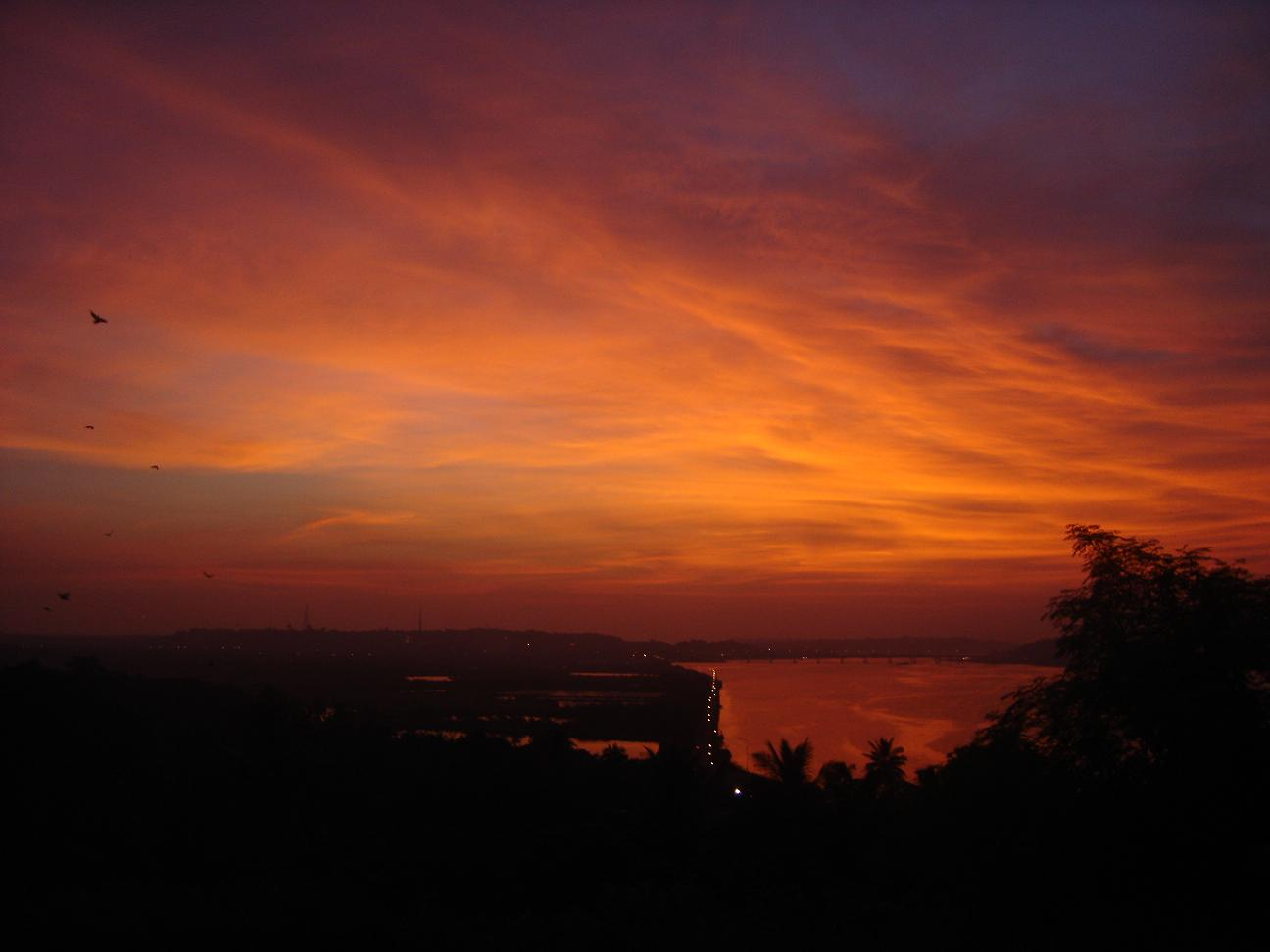
- Ponte Conde de Linhares on the Mandovi River at dusk

- Location of Ribandar in Goa Ribandar (India)
- Coordinates: 15°30′10″N 73°51′55″E
- Country: India
- State: Goa
- District: North Goa
- Sub-district: Ilhas
- Elevation: 3 m (9.8 ft)
- Time zone: UTC+5:30 (IST)
- Postcode: 403006

Ribandar is a town in Tiswadi, Goa, located between the cities of Panjim (Nova Goa) and Old Goa (Velha Goa).

== Etymology ==
The name Ribandar originates from "Rayachem Bandar" in Konkani meaning the wharves, docks or portage of the Rayas or Kings. It is unclear which kings are meant here. The Rayas of Sangama Dynasty of Vijayanagar are believed to have built this port to facilitate the import of horses from Arabia.

== Geography ==
Ribandar is located at 15°30′10″N 73°51′55″E and has an average elevation of 3 metres (9.8 ft).

It is separated from Panjim by the Rio de Ourém (River of Gold), whose junction with the Mandovi River here forms a large, wide, and marshy estuary. This estuary in traversed by an old causeway built in 1633 under the auspices of one of the viceroys of Portuguese India, the Count of Linhares, after whom it is named the Ponte Conde de Linhares. A new road to the south of Ponte Conde de Linhares provides one more link to Ribandar, Chimbel and Old Goa from Panjim.

The islands of Chorão and Divar lie to the north and north-east of Ribandar respectively. The ferry wharf at Ribandar is one of the major means of transportation to these two islands.

== Landmarks ==
The former local Santa Casa da Misericórdia or Holy House of Charity, also called the Royal Portuguese Hospital, houses a management school, the Ribandar campus of the Goa Institute of Management.

== Notable people ==
Antonio Francisco Xavier Alvares (1836–1923), a Syrian Orthodox priest, is buried in St. Mary's Orthodox Syrian Church in Ribandar.

Gurunath V. Shetye (1923-2018) was the founding principal of Bal Bharati Vidyamandir, the first school in Ribandar and nearby villages, established after the liberation of Goa. He donated 2250 sq. mt. of inherited land in Ribandar for the current school buildings.

== Gallery ==
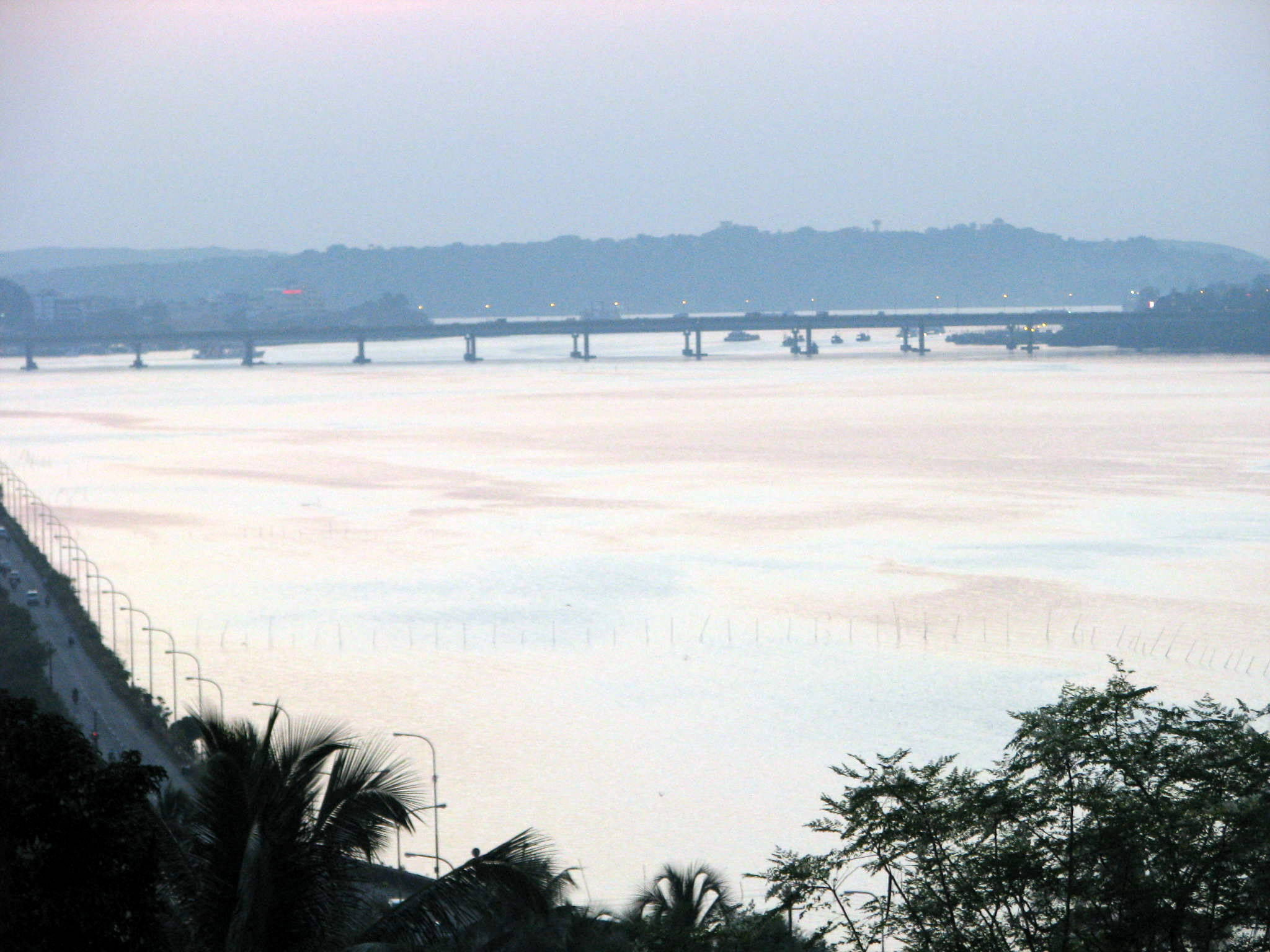
Old Mandovi Bridge in 2008

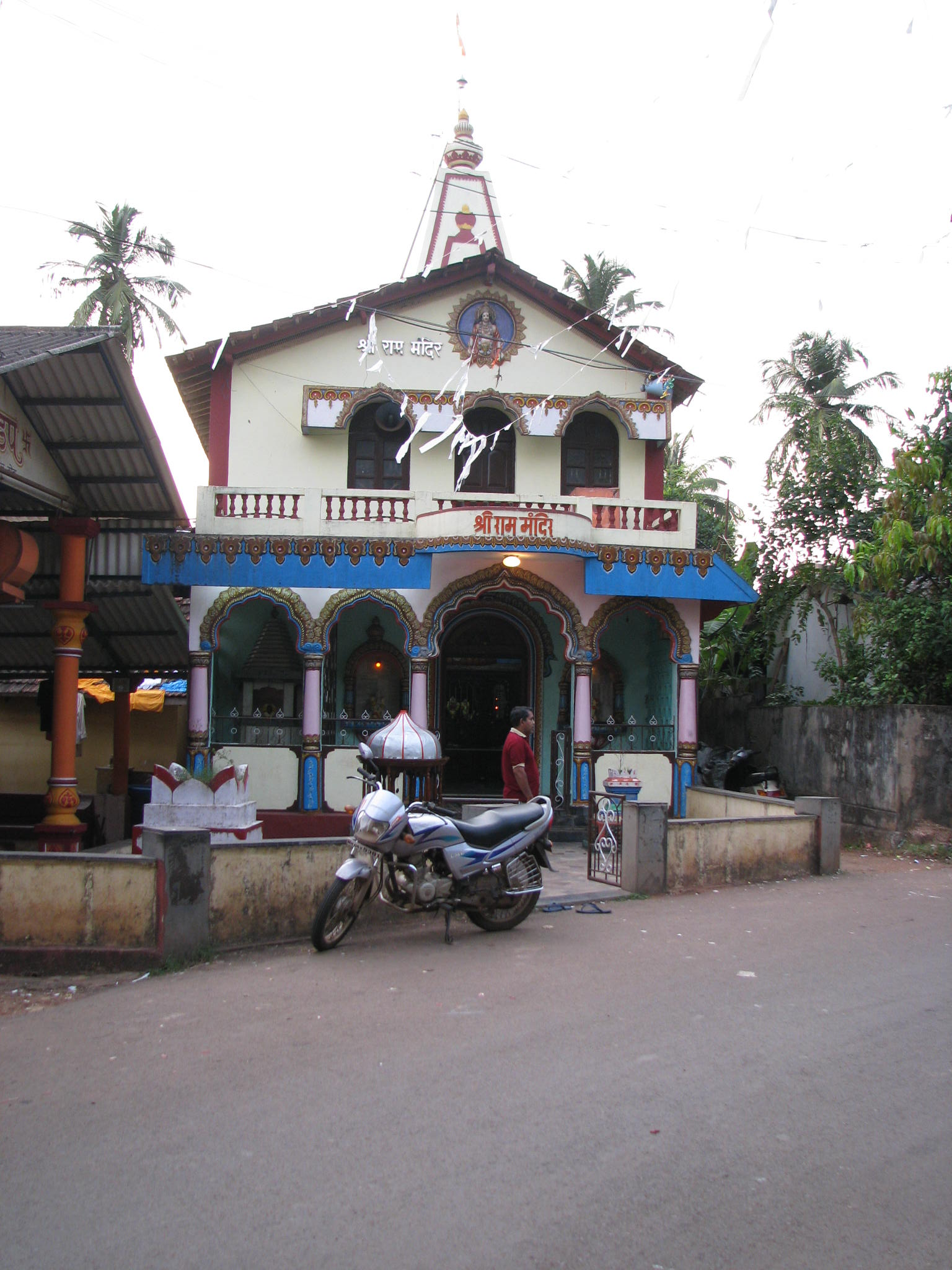
Ram Temple at Ribandar

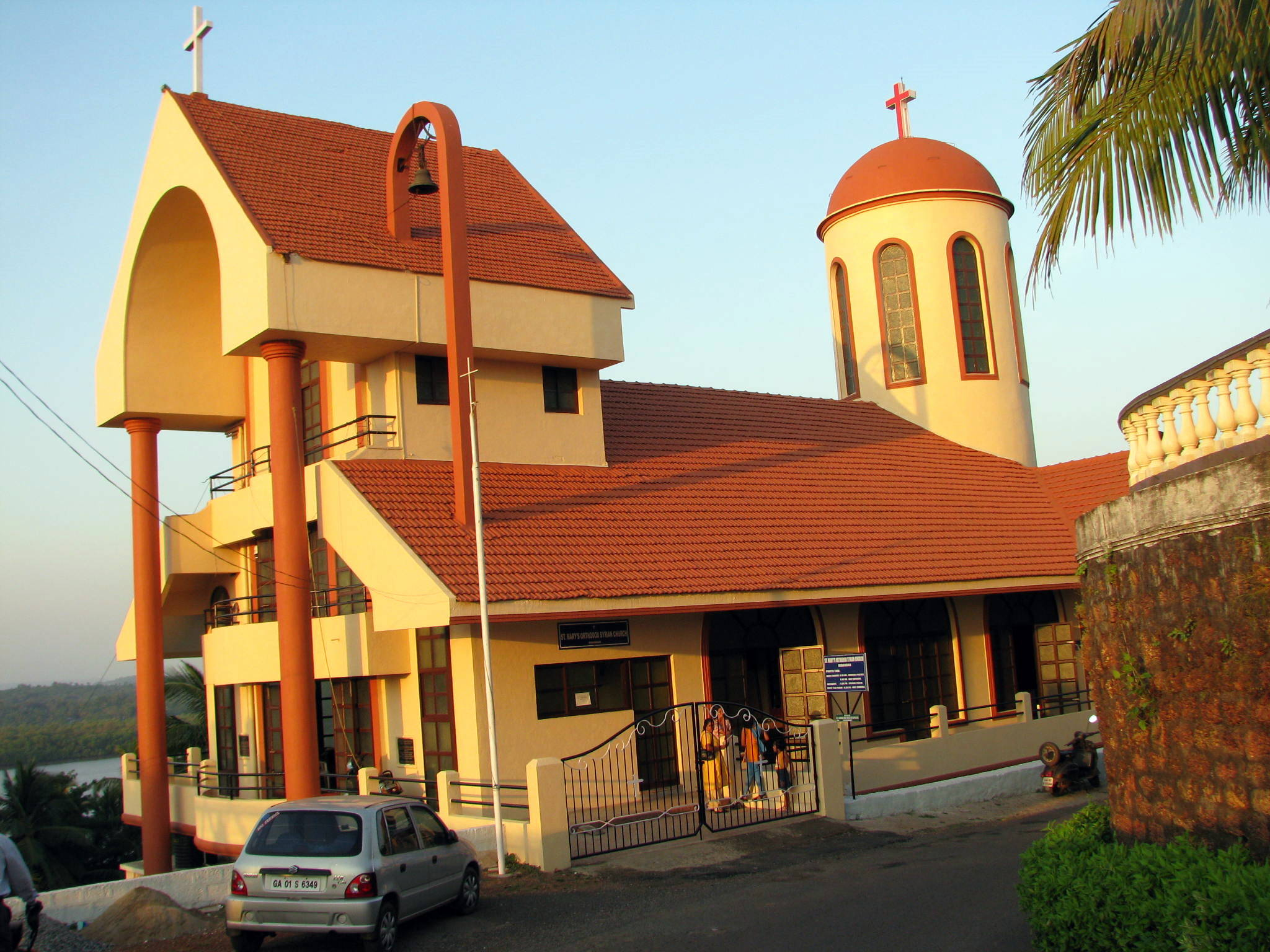
Syrian Orthodox Church

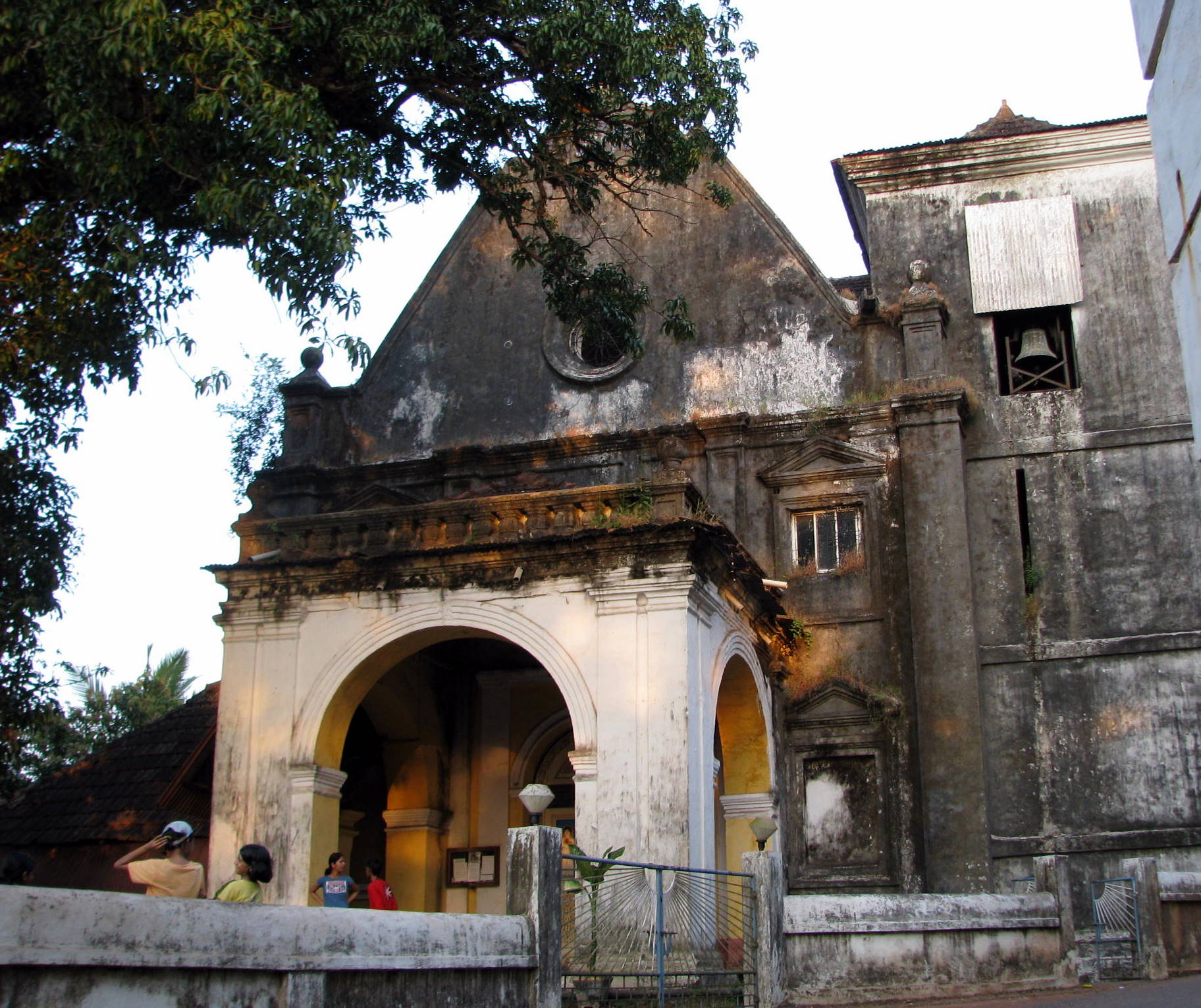
Ribandar Church at Pato

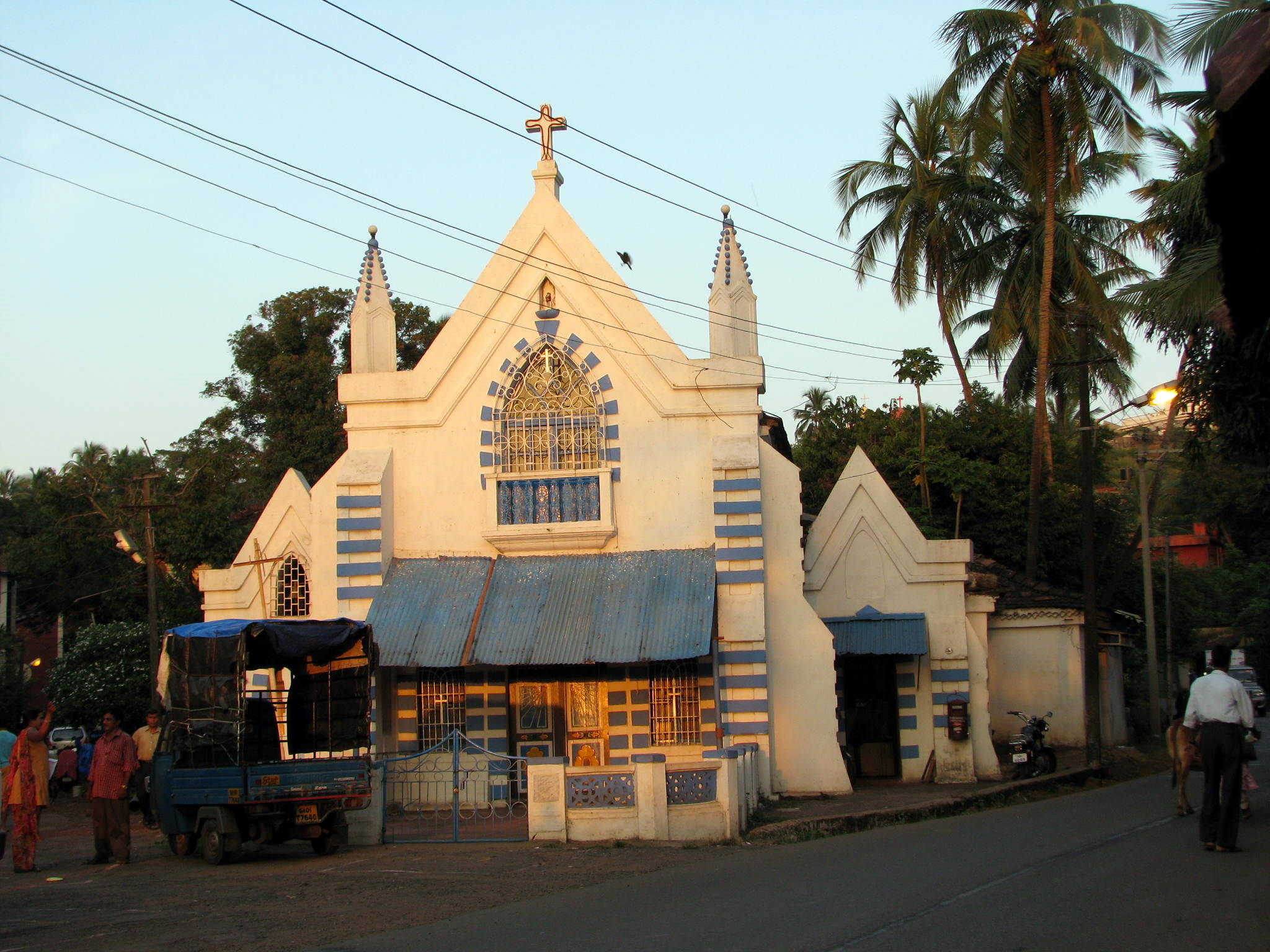
Ribandar Church near Pato

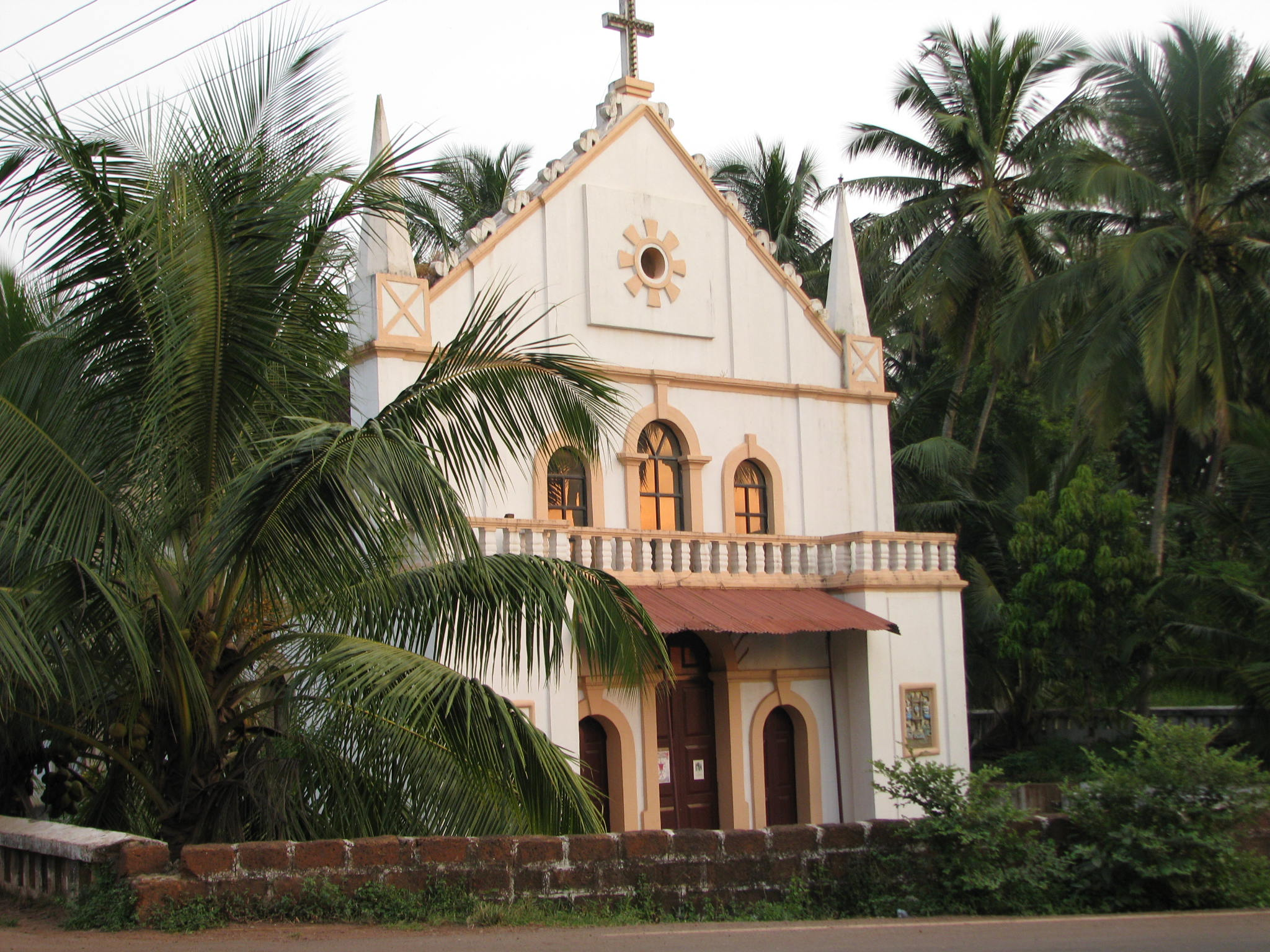
Church at Ribandar foothill
