= Chimbel =

Town in Goa, India

- Town
- Interactive map of Chimbel
- Location within Goa Location within India
- Coordinates: 15.495283°N 73.876955°E
- Country: India
- State: Goa
- District: North Goa
- Sub District: Ilhas

Government
  - Type: Panchayat
  - Sarpanch: Shobhan Arjun Borkar

Area
  - Total: 4.20 km^{2} (1.62 sq mi)
- Elevation: 7 m (23 ft)

Population (2011)
  - Total: 15,289
  - Density: 3,640/km^{2} (9,430/sq mi)

Languages
  - Official: Konkani
  - Also Spoken (understood): English
  - Historical: Portuguese

Religions
  - Dominant: Hinduism
  - Minor: Christianity, Islam
  - Historical: Roman Catholicism
- Time zone: UTC+5:30 (IST)
- Postcode: 403006
- Telephone Code: 0832

Chimbel is a census town in North Goa district in the state of Goa, India.

== Demographics ==
As of 2001 India census, Chimbel had a population of 11,983. Males constitute 51% of the population and females 49%. Chimbel has an average literacy rate of 61%, higher than the national average of 59.5%; with male literacy of 67% and female literacy of 54%. 14% of the population is under 6 years of age.
