= Alfred Rose (singer) =

Indian singer and actor (1932–2003)

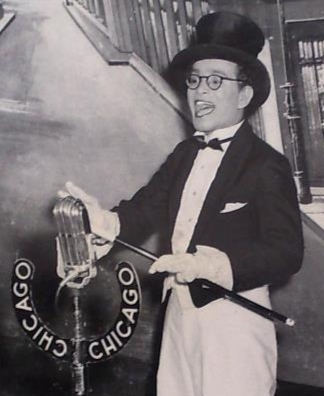
- Fernandes in 1958
- Born: Rosario Alfred Fernandes; 5 August 1932; Calvim, Goa, Portuguese India, Portuguese Empire (now in India)
- Died: 21 October 2003 (aged 71); Mahim, Mumbai, Maharashtra, India
- Other name: Junior Rose
- Occupations: Singer; composer; actor
- Years active: 1943–1999
- Notable work: Amchem Noxib
- Spouse: Rita Rose
- Father: A. M. B. Rose
- Website: alfredrose.com

Rosario Alfred Fernandes (5 August 1932 − 21 October 2003), known professionally as Alfred Rose, was an Indian Konkani singer, composer, and actor. He was one of the most popular singers and composers of Konkani songs in the cantaram category, and his music is regularly broadcast on the Panaji or Panjim station of All India Radio (Akashvani). It is believed that he sang, composed, or both, around 5000 Konkani songs during his career.

== Early life ==
Alfred Rose was born in Calvim, Goa, to tiatrist A. M. B. Rose (Ambrose Fernandes) and Dolarosa Fernandes. He was initially given the nickname "Junior Rose" by tiatrist C. Alvares, being the youngest among the actors at the time. Rose did his tiatr debut in 1943, He took the name "Alfred Rose" in 1950.

== Career ==
=== Melody King ===
He remained one of the most popular tiatrists even after his death, with websites dedicated to him. Alfred Rose was known as The Melody King of Goa. Alfred Rose was also called The Man with the Golden Voice by the His Master's Voice recording company, and gifted other sobriquets like Konkani's Ambassador, International Superstar, and the Living Legend of Konkani Music. He has six decades of musical popularity to his credit, and was christened Junior Rose by versatile Konkani tiatrist C Alvares, as he was the youngest among the actors during his tiatr (a form of Konkani theatre) debut way back in 1943.

=== Firsts ===
Alfred Rose brought out the first Konkani audio cassette. He has the distinction of publishing fourteen song books containing lyrics of the numerous songs he has cut. His novel Vingans Monte Cristochem, based on the famous novel The Count of Monte Cristo of Alexandre Dumas, based on the father of hypnotism - Abbe Faria. His novels include Munis vo Devchar, which is based on his drama by the same title. He introduced the concept of non-stop drama in Konkani with his presentation of Director Saib in 1961.

=== Film ===
Rose acted in Konkani films including Amchem Noxib and Sukhachem Sopon. He provided the musical score, sang, wrote the lyrics for and acted in the Konkani film Bogllant starring Prem Kumar with Rose's wife, Rita Rose - herself a notable singer. He produced and directed his first tiatr Hench Tem Karan in 1956. Some of his hit tiatrs were Rogtak Tannelelo, Lakhpoti Nouro, Dotor Advogad, Bhangaracho Voti, Angounnechi Okol, Munis vo Deuchar, Pessaumcar, Nirmon vo Formonn and Natalanchi Bhett. Alfred Rose also composed music for Bollywood films. The Hindi film Love in Goa has music composed by him. He owned a band called Rosebuds Swing Band along with his brothers Marshall and Albert. He performed in various parts of India and in London, Paris, Frankfurt and the Middle East. Wearing a Panama hat on his head and a magic wand in his hand delivering the opening song for tiatrs became his most identifiable image.

== Discography ==
This is an incomplete list

Year	Song	Film/Album	Composer(s)	Writer(s)	Co-artist(s)
1966	"Goemchi Feni"		Alfred Rose	Alfred Rose	
