= Calvim =

- island/village
- Location in Goa, India Calvim (India)
- Coordinates: 15°29′48.3972″N 73°49′40.1772″E
- Country: India
- State: Goa
- District: North Goa

Languages
  - Official: Konkani
- Time zone: UTC+5:30 (IST)
- Telephone code: 00-91-832
- Vehicle registration: GA
- Nearest city: Mapusa
- Website: vpaldona.goa.gov.in/about-us/

Calvim is an island village situated in the Bardez sub-district or taluka of Goa. It is in the vicinity of the prominent Aldona village.

== Location ==
Calvim comes under the Aldona village panchayat, and is one of the two islands—Corjuem and Calvim-Ponolem—in this jurisdiction. In the vicinity but outside the island are a primary health centre, sub-health centre, Electricity Department and police outpost and a fish market. Calvim is one of the four areas with a bridge in the area, besides three at Corjuem,

== Church ==
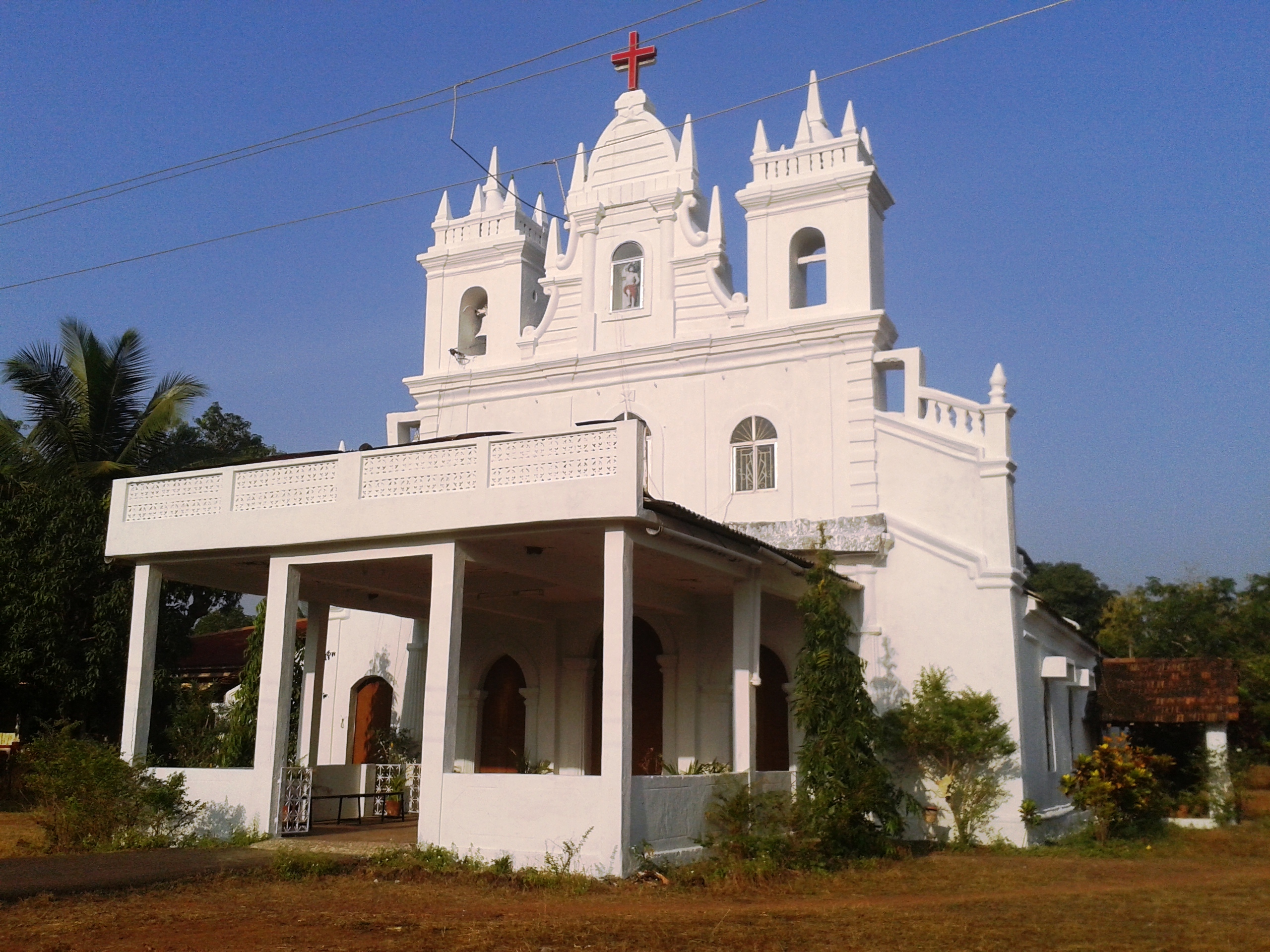
Calvim church.

There is a church at Calvim. According to José Lourenço, the church of St Sebastian (São Sebastião) was elevated as a church in 1980, and has its feast on 15 May. It was originally a chapel built by Calvim islanders and erected on 2 December 1864. Later, it was rebuilt in 1934 and blessed on 24 January 1936. The chapel was filial to the Parish of Aldona, from where it was delinked in 1980, when it was converted into a new parish. The architectural style is Neo-Roman, of medium size with three bays and three stories. Banding on facade apex and pilasters. It has two bell turrets, and finials of spindle and spear type. It has a large concrete porch with cement grille railing on the roof.

== Part of Aldona comunidade ==
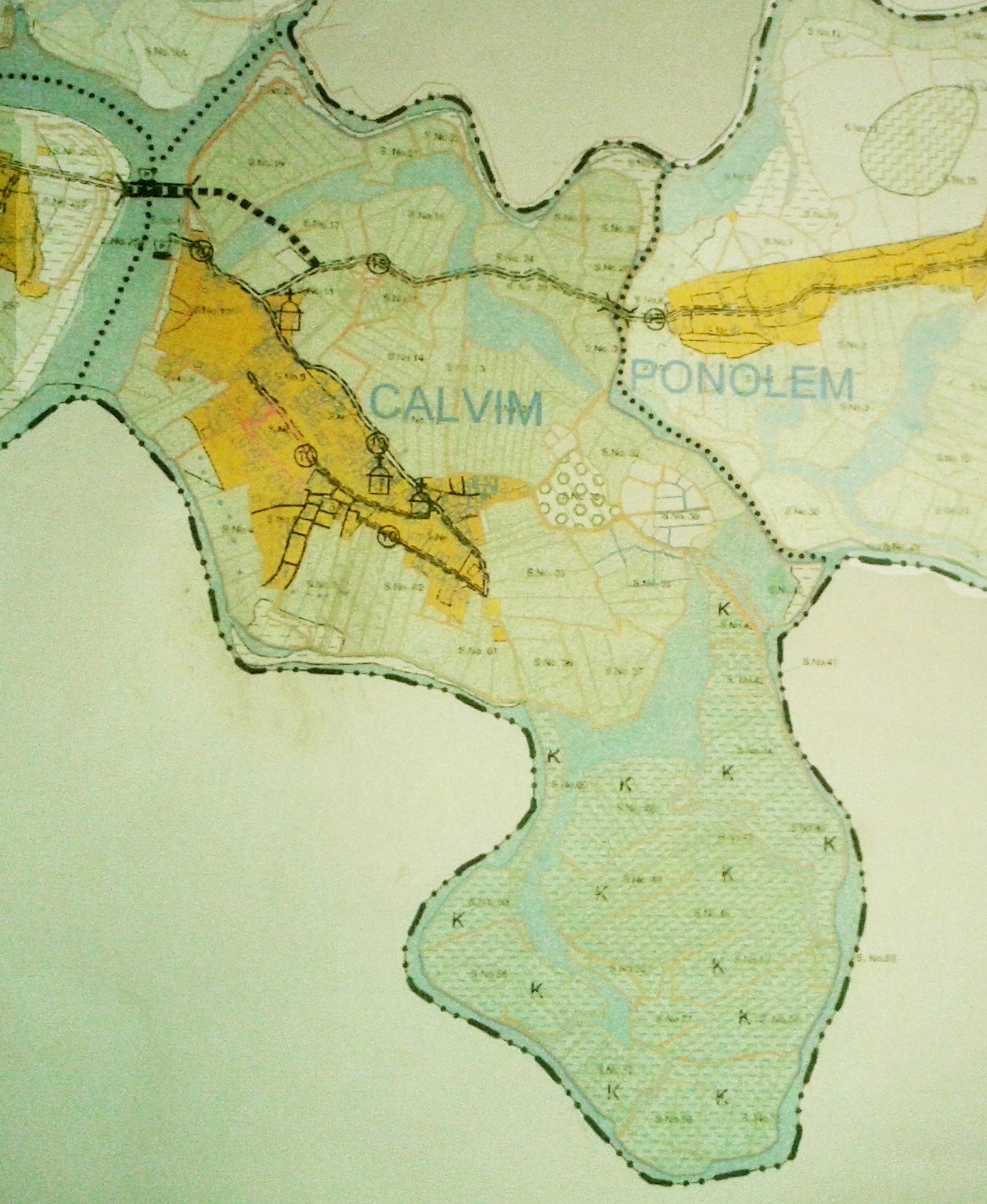
Map of Calvim.

The island of Calvim is one of the fourteen wards or sub-divisions within the Aldona Comunidade. It is accessible by bridge. Other wards of the Aldona comunidade are Quitula, Ranoi, Coimavaddo, Gutcoi, Udoi, Cottarbhat, Santerxette, Panarim, Naikavaddo, Castelvaddo, Carona, Lankdem and Panth.

== Area, population, literacy ==
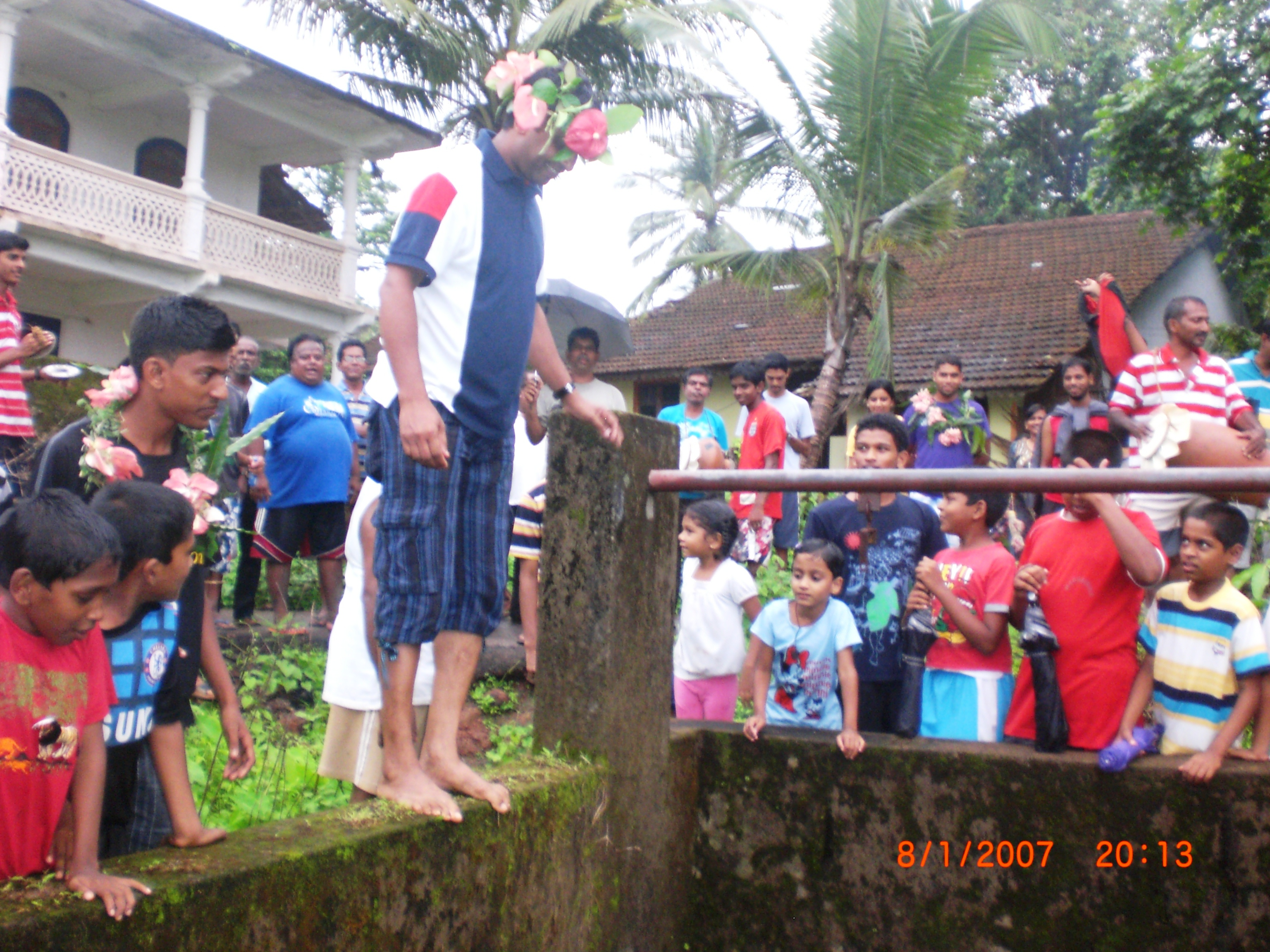
São João, the festival of St John the Baptist, celebrated in Goa by jumping into wells. Villages at Calvim.

Calvim has an area of 135.01 hectares, a total of 113 households, and a population of 403 persons, of whom 180 are males and 223 are females. The higher population of females probably indicates the out-migration from the area, as is the case with many coastal Goan regions. The village has a population of 23 in the zero-to-six years age group, of whom 13 were boys and 10 girls, as of the 2011 Census. Out of its population 309 were literate (146 males and 163 females).

== 2012 tragedy ==
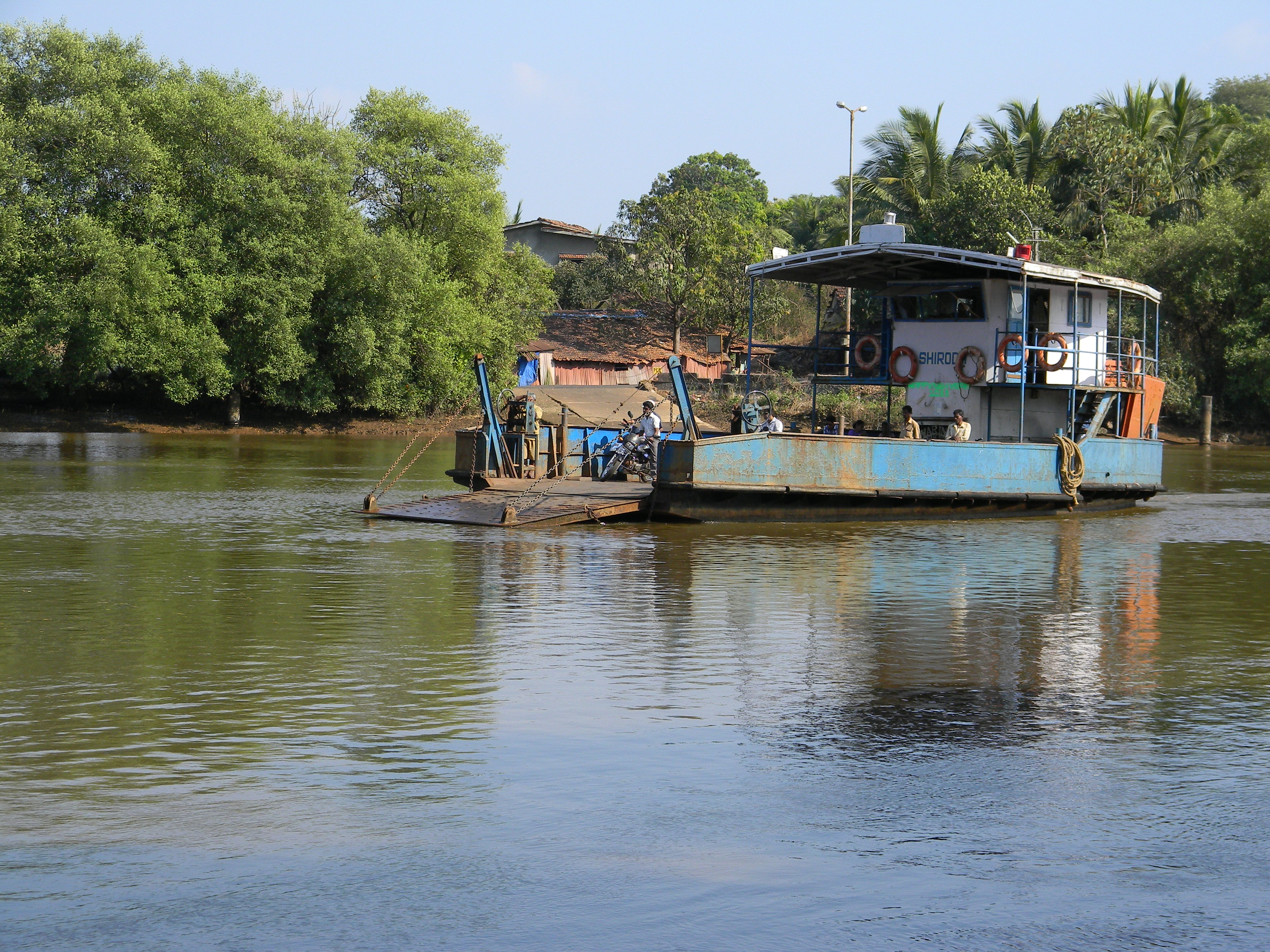
Ferry of pre-2013 times, at Calvim.

Calvim made it to the news following a ghastly 2012 bus tragedy, in which a minibus plunged into the Calvim river, and seven persons were killed, four among them being school students.

At the time of the bus tragedy, there was some speculation that the bus could have been driven by a 17-year-old higher secondary school student.

The minibus lost control and got submerged into the Calvim river. Four students of the St Thomas Girls' High School at Aldona—cousins Diana (8) and Elvina (11) Dias, Priyal Salgaonkar (10) and Nagel Gracias—were killed, with two women and a man. Driver Rajesh Naik and conductor managed to swim out of the bus and fled the scene. Since the Fire Brigade could not drag the bus out of the river, Navy, Air Force and Coast Guard joined the rescue.

The mishap happened when the bus was turning on the small circle at the jetty, and accidentally fell into the river. The bus was submerged deep into the water. Following the tragic accident, the Goa government cancelled its carnival parade.

Tragic images from the scene were shown on the video and TV networks.

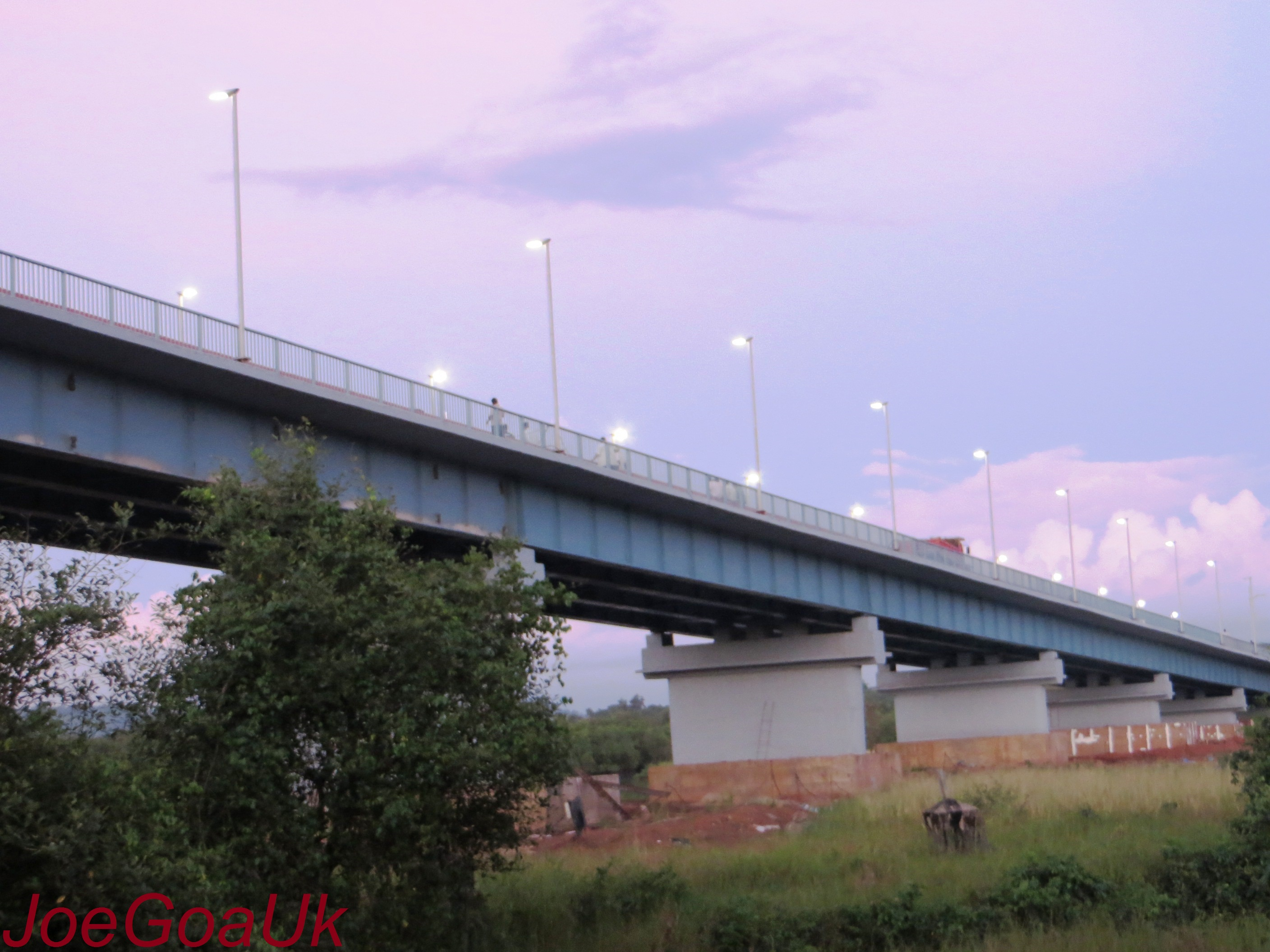
Calvim Bridge, October 2013.

Following the Calvim drowning tragedy of February 2012, Calvim island got the second bridge in Aldona, connecting it with the mainland. The bridge was built at a cost of Rs 61.30 crore, has a length of 494 metres, and a navigational span of 120 metres. The two-lane bridge with footpaths on either sides was started in November 2012 and completed in October 2013.

The accident shook the locality, and has been marked and commemorated in later years.
