= Justiniano Fernandes =

Indian actor and playwright (born 1959)

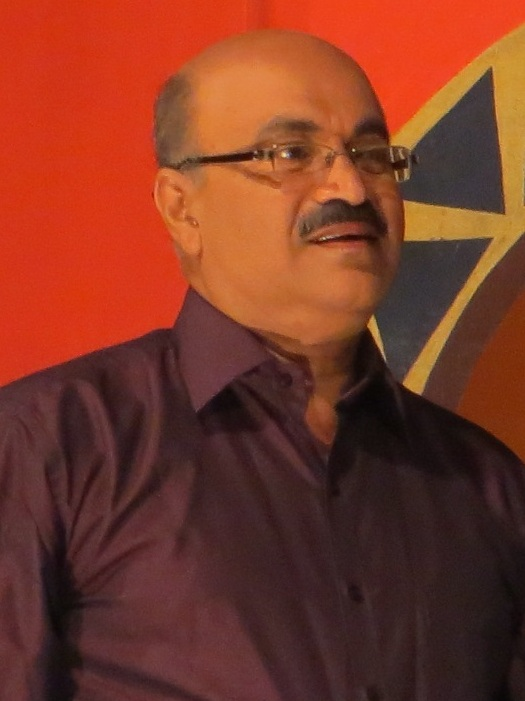
- Fernandes during a performance in Sammy Tavares' tiatr Tim Thikam Sanddlelim, 2014
- Born: 8 March 1959 (age 67); Sanguem, Goa, Portuguese India, Portuguese Empire
- Education: Secondary School Certificate (SSC)
- Occupations: Actor; playwright
- Years active: 1989–present
- Notable work: Padri (2005)
- Spouse: Cicilia Rodrigues (m. 1989)
- Children: 2
- Awards: TAG's "Lifetime Contribution to Tiatr Award" (2022)

Justiniano Fernandes (born 8 March 1959) is an Indian actor and playwright known for his work in Konkani films and tiatr productions.

== Early life ==
Justiniano Fernandes was born on 8 March 1959, in Sanguem, Goa. His birth coincided with a period when Goa was under Portuguese colonial rule. Fernandes, a member of a Goan Catholic family, was the eldest of three children. His father, Francisco Xavier Silvestre Fernandes, was a tailor and musician, known for his skills playing the banjo, while his mother, Emilia Fernandes, was a homemaker. His younger siblings were Caetano (born 1969), and sister Salvação, (born 1961). Fernandes's early life was marked by exposure to music and performance. His father's musical talents and his uncle Cajie's musical inclinations fostered a love for the arts. Then at the age of eight, Fernandes performed a comedic song at a cultural program at his school, Milagres High School in Sanguem. His performance received commendation from the parish priest in attendance.

Fernandes' early theatrical career was marked by a foundation in his school years. He received encouragement from Fr Philomena D'Costa, the principal of his school, who played a pivotal role in fostering his artistic development. His first play, Ghorabeacho Ekvott, debuted during his tenth grade, earning him recognition and a cash prize from the principal. Following his secondary education, Fernandes pursued his interests in theater by collaborating with his colleagues to write and direct one-act plays. His play Piso achieved success at an inter-ward drama competition in Sanguem, securing first place. Subsequently, he created another one-act play intended for a competition in Chandor, which received top honors from judges Felicio Cardoso and Uday Bhembre.

== Career ==
Fernandes's theatrical journey began with his participation in regional theatrical contests organized by the village's holiday committee. His talent for writing and directing tiatrs, a traditional Goan musical theatre form, was quickly recognized, leading to several awards. He made his debut as a playwright with the tiatr Bhoinnik Lagon and was later complemented by the staging of one-act plays in multiple venues throughout Goa. His performances caught the attention of Premanand Lotlikar. In 1989, Lotlikar offered him a role in his production Rup vo Rupnnem, marking Fernandes's entry into professional theatre. He went on to appear in several other tiatrs by Lotlikar, including Zindabad, Ho Mhozo Oprad, and Kednanch Borem Zai Naka. Fernandes's talent was further recognized by tiatr director Jose Rod, who cast him as a substitute in his production Mauli. The play garnered acclaim, achieving a total of 50 performances and extending its reach through a tour in the Gulf region. Fernandes continued to build his career with roles in tiatrs such as Nison.

Fernandes's career in Goan tiatr was marked by his collaborations with a wide range of popular figures in the genre. He appeared in productions by playwrights and directors, including Ben Evangelisto, Prince Jacob, Mini Mario, Mario Menezes, Kenny Ferns, Anthony San, Prem Kumar, and Antush D'Silva. The plays include Pirai by Kenny, Mhaka Tuji Goroz by Anthony, Vauraddi by Kumar, Ho Mhozo Kaido by D'Silva, Ben's tiatr Chondrim, Jacob's Posko, Papi, Pai, Pirachit, and Passport, this involved a pair of tours to the Gulf region. Fernandes took part in the tiatr Koso Asa directed by Mini Mario, which included Lorna among its performers. Menezes further cast him in two additional productions: Tiatr Somplo, Cholat Ghara and Sonvsarant Konn Nhoim Konnacho. Fernandes spent six years with Comedian Ambe's troupe, during which he delivered a diverse range of performances. These collaborations provided Fernandes with experience and exposure, contributing to his development as a performer. In the mid-2010s, he established himself as a frequent participant to the productions of Jr. Reagan, appearing in several of his tiatrs, including Teddy Bear, Teacher, Ticket, and Tiatr, culminating in his participation in the 2015 tiatr Taj Mahal.

Fernandes's theatrical career was marked by a breakthrough in 2012. He received the Late Dr Jack Sequeira Best Actor Award for his performance in Sammy Tavares's tiatr Aplea Bhurgeam Sangata (With Their Children), presented by the Taleigao Cultural Group. This performance, which depicted a father's life journey from marriage to old age, was considered by Fernandes to be a pivotal role in his career. In 2014, his involvement in Tavares's Tim Thikam Sanddlelim led to international tours, including performances in the Gulf, London, and the United States. This production featured a unique familial element, as Fernandes's two younger brothers, Cajy and Jose, joined the troupe. Cajy's drumming and Jose's solo performances added an unexpected dimension to the production.

Fernandes's career spanned between public service, film, and theatre. He began his professional life in the Water Resources Department, but his artistic talents led him to a career in entertainment. He has made appearances in more than 30 VCDs, three feature films, and several stage productions. His film credits include Padri and Roddonaka directed by Prince Jacob, and Bonifacio Dias's Moriad. He has also starred in the VCDs Challis Dis by Mouzinho Travasso and Pirai by Joywin, often alongside his wife Cicilia and daughters Eglise and Elina. Fernandes is particularly known for his contributions to Goan theatre. The tiatr Fuddar, created by him, received accolades at the Kala Academy's annual tiatr competition in 1990, securing the third position. In 2013, the work was subsequently released as a book by the Dalgado Konknni Akademi. He has also promoted Goan culture through various broadcasts on All India Radio (AIR) and by creating a folk play named Uxir Zalo. In January 2015, Fernandes performed his play Bezababdar in Saudi Arabia, with the production sponsored by the United Goans of Saudi Arabia.

== Personal life ==
On 13 May 1989, Fernandes, aged 30, married Cicilia Lowrecine Rodrigues, aged 26, at the Sanguem church. They had their civil marriage registration completed a day earlier at Sanguem. Fernandes's wife, Cicilia, is a homemaker who was born in Bombay, India, and resided in Curtorim, Goa. The couple has two daughters, Eglise and Elina. As of 2018, Fernandes resides in his ancestral neighborhood of Bamonsai, Sanguem. He is not a full-time tiatrist but worked in the Water Resource Department of the Government of Goa. He has expressed his concerns regarding alcohol consumption and other detrimental behaviors among emerging tiatrists, emphasizing the importance of preserving the integrity of the Konkani stage.
