= Afonso (surname) =

Afonso is a surname which may refer to:

- Andrey Nazário Afonso, known as Andrey (footballer, born 1983), Brazilian footballer
- Ana Afonso (1976–2024), Portuguese model and actress
- Diogo Afonso, 15th century Portuguese explorer
- Eddie Afonso (born 1994), Angolan footballer
- Guilherme Afonso (born 1985), Angolan footballer
- João Afonso (disambiguation)
- Jorge Afonso (c. 1470–1540), Portuguese Renaissance painter
- José Afonso (1929–1987), Portuguese folk singer-songwriter
- Kiki Afonso (born 1994), Portuguese footballer
- Leo Afonso (born 2001), Brazilian footballer
- Leoncio Afonso (1916–2017), Spanish professor of geography
- Manuel Afonso (1917–2000), Portuguese football manager
- Martim Afonso, baptismal name of Arariboia (c. 1520–1589), leader of the Temiminó tribe in Brazil, founder of the city of Niterói
- Martim Afonso, baptismal name of Tibiriçá (died 1562), Brazilian Amerindian leader
- Mor Afonso, baptismal name of Madragana (c. 1230–?), mistress of Afonso III of Portugal
- Nadir Afonso (1920–2013), Portuguese painter
- Nelson Afonso (1934–1982), Indian singer, composer, playwright and theatre director
- Nuno Afonso (born 1974), Portuguese footballer
- Osório Citora Afonso (1972–2026), Mozambican Catholic bishop
- Pedro Afonso (sprinter) (born 2007), Portuguese sprinter
- Ronaldo Afonso (born 2000), Santomean footballer
- Salomé Afonso (born 1997), Portuguese middle-distance runner
- Tommy Afonso (born 1960), Portuguese singer, theatre actor, composer and playwright
- Víctor Afonso (born 1971), Spanish football manager and former player
- Yves Afonso (1944–2018), French actor of Portuguese descent
