= Ben Evangelisto =

Indian comedian and actor (born 1966)

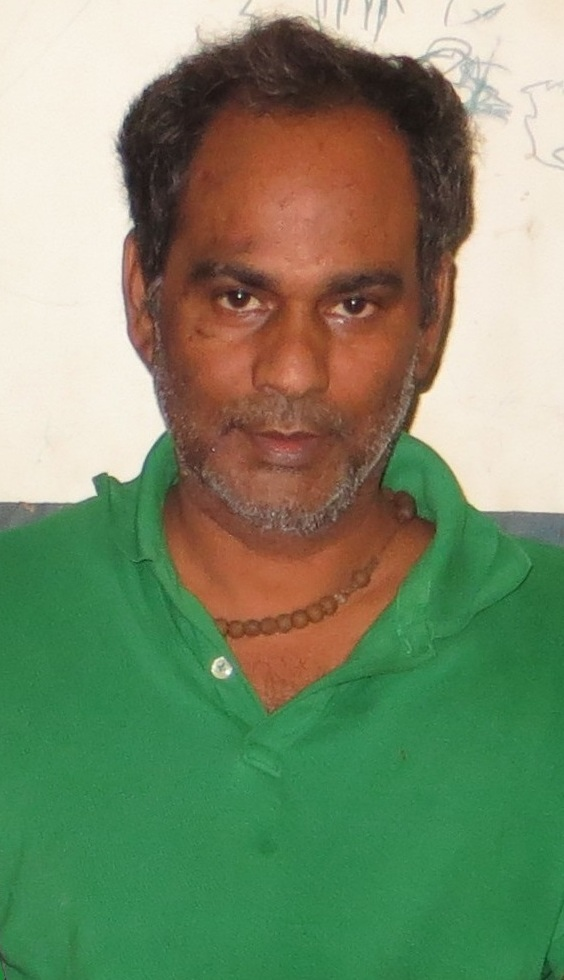
- Fernandes in 2013
- Born: Evangelisto Diogo Agnelo Fernandes; 10 September 1966 (age 60); Margao, Goa, India
- Other name: Big Ben
- Occupations: Comedian; actor; singer; playwright
- Years active: 1980–2012; 2017–present
- Spouse: Sibila Rodrigues (m. 2008)
- Children: 2
- Website: facebook.com/benevangelisto.fernandes

Evangelisto Diogo Agnelo Fernandes (born 10 September 1966), known professionally as Ben Evangelisto, is an Indian comedian, actor, singer, and playwright known for his work in Konkani films and tiatr (theatre) productions.

== Early life ==
Evangelisto Diogo Agnelo Fernandes was born on 10 September 1966 in Margao, Goa, India. He was the son of Caetano Fernandes, a seafarer, and Maria Purificaçaò Goes, a homemaker. Fernandes's paternal uncle was a performer of moderate acclaim, known for his contribution in a minor capacity to the Konkani film Jivit Amchem Oxem. From a young age, Fernandes demonstrated an interest in Goan Konkani theater, known locally as tiatrs. During his childhood at the age of 9, he was a frequent spectator at the non stop dramas presented by Rosario Rodrigues, a popular figure in the Goan khell tiatr tradition. Fernandes was also influenced by the similar works of young tiatr artists from Colva, such as Rosary Ferns. Following the viewing of these performances, he would go back to his uncle's residence in Sernabatim and replicate the cants or songs from the tiatrs, with a focus on those created by Rodrigues.

At the age of 12, Fernandes matriculated at St. Anthony's boarding school located in Duler, Mapusa. During this period, he commenced composing his own unique tiatrs, marking the start of his career as a Konkani playwright. During his tenure as a young boarding student at St. Anthony's, Fernandes exhibited an aptitude for acting, which was initially identified by the Franciscans brothers. While studying at the institution, he crafted brief dramatic pieces in Konkani and English, with the assistance of the brothers in bringing these theatrical works to life on stage. Fernandes also received additional training in music and singing from mestre Anthony Velho. Among Fernandes's early dramatic writings was an English-language play titled Goa Today that addressed the emerging issue of drug addiction in the Goa region.

== Career ==
Fernandes rose to prominence in the Konkani theater scene in the late 20th century. In 1980, his foray into acting commenced with the creation of the play Goa Today for an English theatrical production, ultimately winning in an inter-house competition by clinching the first prize. Over the following years, he continued to participate in and win fancy dress competitions in his local community. He then transitioned to acting in small Konkani tiatrs directed by local figures such as Cyril Fernandes and the Affonso Brothers. Fernandes' big break came when he was cast in a children's tiatr directed by Mini Mario, titled Adim Tum, Atam Hanv (Before You, Now I Am). After this production, he achieved his goal of performing in tiatrs directed by the popular director Rosario Rodrigues. He was cast in Rodrigues' play Hanv Kallokant Sandlim (I've Lost in Darkness) as well as several other shows directed by Rodrigues. He later began collaborating with another well-known director, Roseferns, appearing in his tiatr Beiman Tum (You Faithless One). This production ran for 60-70 shows, with Fernandes playing a comedic role as a "spring priest" that drew both praise and criticism from audiences. Following his work with Roseferns, he continued to act in multiple additional tiatrs directed by him over the subsequent years.

Fernandes' career has spanned multiple roles, including both acting and producing. Early in his career, he was cast by Roseferns to portray the role of a grandmother in the tiatr Xinxe (Glass). He went on to perform in a series of tiatrs directed by other popular playwrights, including three productions by Jose Rod, as well as works by C. D'Silva, John D' Silva, Rosario Rodrigues, Prem Kumar, Pascoal Rodrigues, and Mario Menezes. Fernandes has also expanded his reach beyond Goa, traveling abroad to perform tiatrs in the Gulf region, the United Kingdom, France, Portugal, and Canada. In addition to his acting work, he has penned several non-stop tiatrs, including Chondrim (Moon), Kidd (Worm), Pez (Congee), Devak Zai Zalear (If God Wills), among others. After collaborating with John D' Silva, he joined the troupe of Mario Menezes, appearing in acclaimed plays such as Mhoji Maim, Mhoji Dusman (My Mother, My Enemy) and Sangat Ami Bhurgim Konanchi? (Say, Whose Children Are We?). Fernandes has also directed and staged his own productions, including the play Kidd which was performed in London. His play Chondrim was particularly well-received, set against the backdrop of a waterfall.

Fernandes is known for his dynamic and convincing performances in a range of roles. One of his acclaimed portrayals was in the production of To Amkam Visorlo (He Forgot Us), penned by playwright Jacinto Vaz, imitating as Vaz himself. His talents were further showcased when he took on the same role in a revival of the classic work Sounsar Sudorlo by M. Boyer, directed by Anil Kumar. He convincingly embodied Vaz's character, creating a performance that left audiences believing they were witnessing the return of Vaz himself to the stage. In addition to his own acting accomplishments, Fernandes played a role in reviving the careers of other popular Konkani artists. He played a role in persuading the Konkani singer Lorna Cordeiro to make a comeback to live performances. Subsequently, he collaborated with her in producing musical shows that were presented in key European cities including London, Paris, and Lisbon. Fernandes also introduced the singer Nephie Rod to his own tiatr productions. After completing a successful two-year performance run in London, he decided to return to his hometown of Goa and became a member of Menino De Bandar's theater ensemble. However, in December 2012, while participating in a comedic skit during an afternoon performance, he suffered a mild stroke while playing the tuba, temporarily halting his involvement in Konkani theatre.

Fernandes has had a varied career in Konkani theater. In 2017, he returned to the stage with the production Goy, Goykar, Goykarponn, authored by Mariano. He later wrote and produced his own 2020 play titled Utt Ani Chol (Get Up and Walk), which drew inspiration from his personal life experiences, health challenges, and religious faith. For Utt Ani Chol, Fernandes cast C. D'Silva, an actor who had previously portrayed elderly female characters in one of Fernandes' play Kidd. Fernandes' wife, Sibila, who is also a tiatrist, provided the voiceover for this production. Fernandes is known for his versatility as a comedic performer. He is particularly acclaimed for his ability to impersonate a range of famous personalities, including Jacinto Vaz, Remo Fernandes, Michael Jackson, and Bob Marley, among others. His performance mimicking Michael Jackson's signature dance moves and rendition of Michael Jackson's song "Black or White" in Konkani garnered praise from audiences. In September 2021, Fernandes expanded his repertoire by appearing as a singer, alongside his daughter Ben Cecilia, in a musical homage dedicated to. This production was created by Maestro Shahu Almeida and was showcased on the platform YouTube.

== Personal life ==
Fernandes and his future wife Sibila Rodrigues met while the latter was a college student. In her third year of study, she finalized a project focusing on the theme "Amcho Goyncho Tiatr" (Our Goa's Tiatr). As part of this project, Rodrigues conducted an interview with Fernandes. Following the interview, they developed a romantic relationship.

Sibila, the daughter of Batu Rodrigues, a tiatrist known for his work in Ribandar, is also actively involved in the Konkani stage as a singer. Fernandes resides in Vaswaddo in Benaulim, his father's hometown. His daughter, Cecilia, also known as Ben Cecilia, is a Konkani singer like her parents. Fernandes is a devout Christian.

=== 2012 health setback ===
In December 2012, Fernandes encountered a mild stroke while engaged in a tuba performance within a tiatr production at Ravindra Bhavan, Margao. He was transported to a nearby private medical facility and promptly admitted to the intensive care unit (ICU) to receive immediate medical attention. Tests carried out on Fernandes detected a blood clot, which was successfully treated and resolved within the subsequent three days. He remained hospitalized under close monitoring for several additional days before being discharged after a total of five days. Fernandes later made a return to performing tiatrs in August 2017 with the production Goem, Goenkar, Goenkarponn (Goa, Goans, Goaness) directed by Mario Fernandes. However, the stroke had left Fernandes with lasting partial paralysis.
