= Mini Mario (singer) =

Singer-songwriter and actor (born 1967)

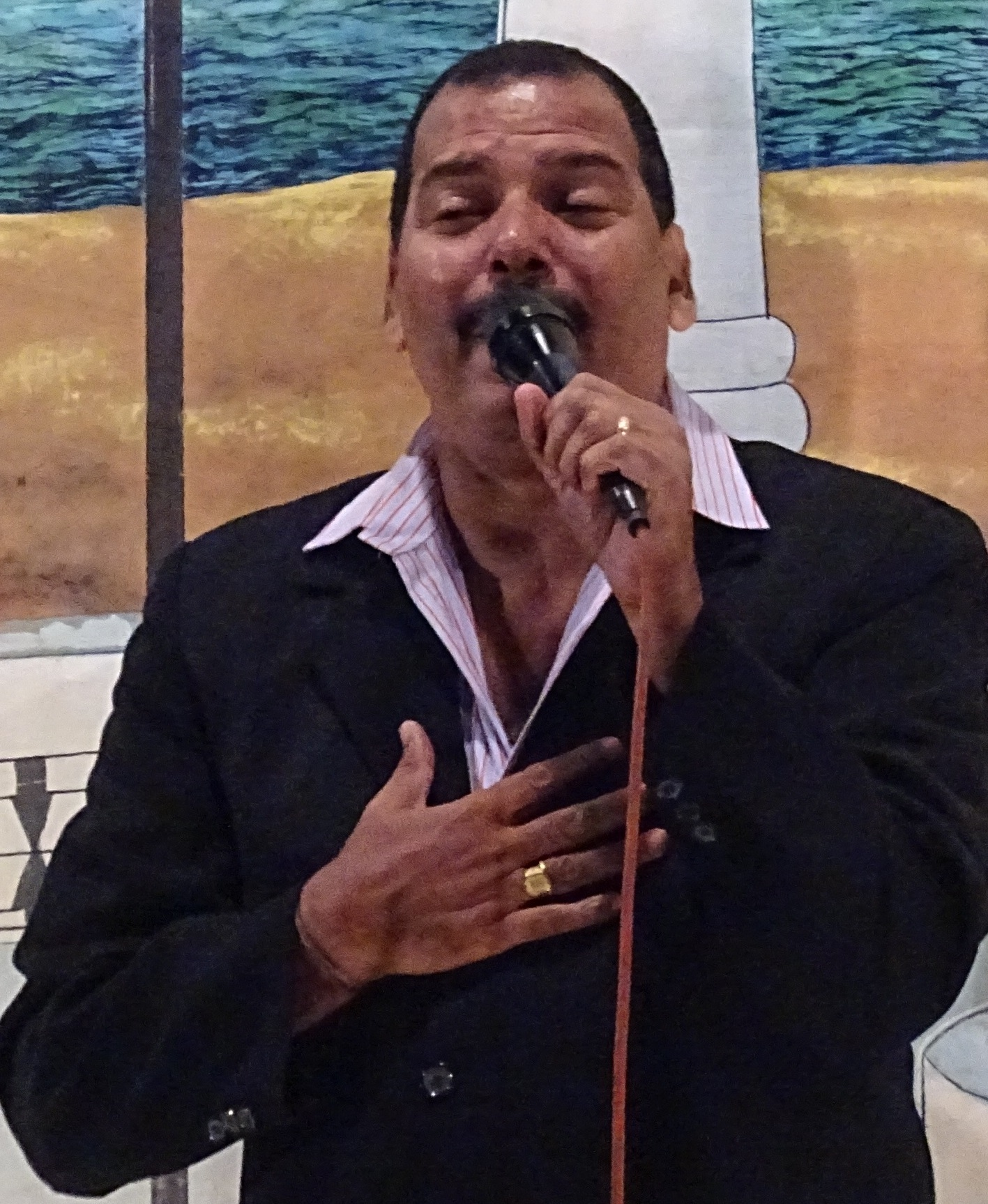
- D'Silva during a performance in the tiatr Hantrunn Polleun Payem Sodd, 2015
- Born: Evaristo Menino Mariano da Silva; 26 October 1967 (age 58); Margao, Goa, India
- Other names: Menino Mario
- Occupations: Singer-songwriter; actor; playwright; director
- Years active: c. 1977–present
- Spouse: Leticia Barreto (m. 1995)
- Children: 2

Evaristo Menino Mariano D'Silva (né da Silva; born 26 October 1967), known professionally Mini Mario, is a singer-songwriter, actor, playwright, and director based in London, United Kingdom. He is known for his work in Konkani films and tiatr (theatre) productions.

== Early life ==
He was born into a family with a history in the tiatr theatrical tradition of Goa. His father was actively involved in khell performances, particularly in those associated with Magnier Rod. His uncle Merciano was known as a popular figure in the field of khell tiatr, during this time period. From a young age, D'Silva was exposed to the tiatr art form. He regularly engaged in singing alongside his father, often enjoying the experience of listening to him perform and gradually learning the techniques and skills of tiatr performance. He often witnessed the practice sessions for khell tiatrs held in his home, directed by his father and uncle. Through these early experiences immersed in the tiatr tradition.

D'Silva, at 8 years old, participated in cooperative endeavors with other children in his village to construct makeshift stages for tiatr theatrical performances. Using bed sheets and curtains, they would set up these stages. Rosary Ferns, an experienced tiatrist, would organize and mentor the young performers for a period of roughly three months. This preparation culminated in the children presenting the tiatr productions before the entire community during the celebrations of the Feast of the Cross, which occurred annually in the month of May.

For these performances, D'Silva and his friends utilized coconut shells as rudimentary microphones. D'Silva also demonstrated an early aptitude for the performing arts within his school setting. He was involved in the creation of musical pieces and participated in performances at academic events and social assemblies. However, he was required to discontinue his formal education in order to devote himself full-time to his acting and singing career, as his family was unable to provide the necessary financial support for his education.

== Career ==
D'Silva made his initial foray into the realm of tiatr during his early childhood, stepping onto the stage for the first time at the age of nine. He appeared in the village tiatr production Ghat Apleak Sontos Peleak, which was directed by Rosary Ferns. Subsequently, at the age of 10, he was ushered into the realm of professional tiatr by his villager compatriot, A. M. Pacheco. Pacheco featured him in his tiatr work Dhag. D'Silva's singing and acting talents soon caught the attention of other popular tiatr directors, who began incorporating him into their own productions. Premanand Lotlikar included him in the cast of his tiatr production Loz Ani Dukh, while Menino De Bandar then selected him to perform in the tiatr Vizmit. D'Silva then became a fixture in Roseferns' theatrical group, debuting in his play Thapott and eventually featuring in around 23 tiatrs directed by him during his career. His long-standing involvement with Roseferns' tiatr company culminated in his appearance in the production Jem Tujem Tem Mhojem.

D'Silva has collaborated with a range of professional directors over the course of his career. These directors include figures such as Rosario Rodrigues, Mariano Fernandes, Prince Jacob, Mario Menezes, John D'Silva, Jack Ferry, and Pascoal Rodrigues. With proficiency in vocal performance and acting, D'Silva transitioned his focus to writing and directing original theatrical productions, drawing upon his experience. His first self-directed work, a tiatr (a form of Goan theatre) titled Nit, was presented in several villages to a favorable response from the viewers. Encouraged by the positive outcome of this initial production, he took the step of founding a theater company centered around his play Adim Tum Atam Hanv. As of March 2015, he had written and directed approximately 36 tiatrs, with a particular focus on exploring themes and narratives centered around family dynamics and relationships.

D'Silva is known for his versatility on stage. In addition to acting in a variety of dramatic roles, as a singer, he is particularly known for his solo vocal performances. He communicates profound messages and themes through the original songs he composes and performs. Following his departure from the Roseferns theatrical troupe, D'Silva joined the tiatr productions directed by Patrick Dourado. During this time, he closely observed and studied Dourado's popular tiatr performances. On one occasion, D'Silva shared one of his own original songs with Dourado, who then provided him guidance and mentorship on developing effective rhythmic elements in his musical compositions. He credits Dourado as a significant influence and teacher when it comes to his musical work. In his own tiatr productions, D'Silva demonstrates a preference for writing scripts that are thematically relevant to contemporary audiences. He often chooses to feature up-and-coming, inexperienced actors instead of exclusively employing seasoned tiatr performers.

D'Silva draws inspiration from religious and literary sources for his songwriting. According to him, studying the Bible provides him with a diverse range of themes to explore in his musical work. In addition to other sources of inspiration, he incorporates ideas from newspapers and wisdom literature into his compositions. As of March 2015, he had released 12 audio albums. his latest publication was the album named Mhozo Award Tumi. In addition to his musical output, D'Silva demonstrates versatility by taking on a diverse range of roles, encompassing lead roles, antagonistic characters, comedic portrayals, and various other character types. His proficiency in both singing and acting provides directors with a strategic advantage, enabling them to optimize resources by leveraging a single artist for a range of creative responsibilities, thereby enhancing cost-effectiveness and efficiency in theatrical productions. D'Silva expresses a preference for performances that integrate both his singing and acting abilities, rather than limiting himself solely to singing. He believes this allows him to provide entertainment value to audiences.

== Personal life ==
He has two children: a son, Bladwin, and a daughter, Ashbel. His son, Bladwin, is a fellow Konkani comedian who goes by the stage name Master Win. As of 2018, D'Silva resided in Ninvaddo, Colva. He later relocated and settled in London, UK.

D'Silva is a full-time tiatrist. He expresses that his experience as a school dropout led to difficulties in his life. While he possessed a comprehensive understanding of tiatr, this specialization did not facilitate the acquisition of other skills or knowledge that would be beneficial for his future opportunities. He contemplates on his incomplete formal education with a sense of regret, noting that it troubles him consistently. He reflects on the idea that, if he had not become a tiatrist, he would have been interested in pursuing careers as a tailor or a mechanic. His father, on the other hand, opposed his pursuit of these interests, insisting that he continue in the family business.
