= Diana Fernandes =

Indian actress and singer (born 1942)

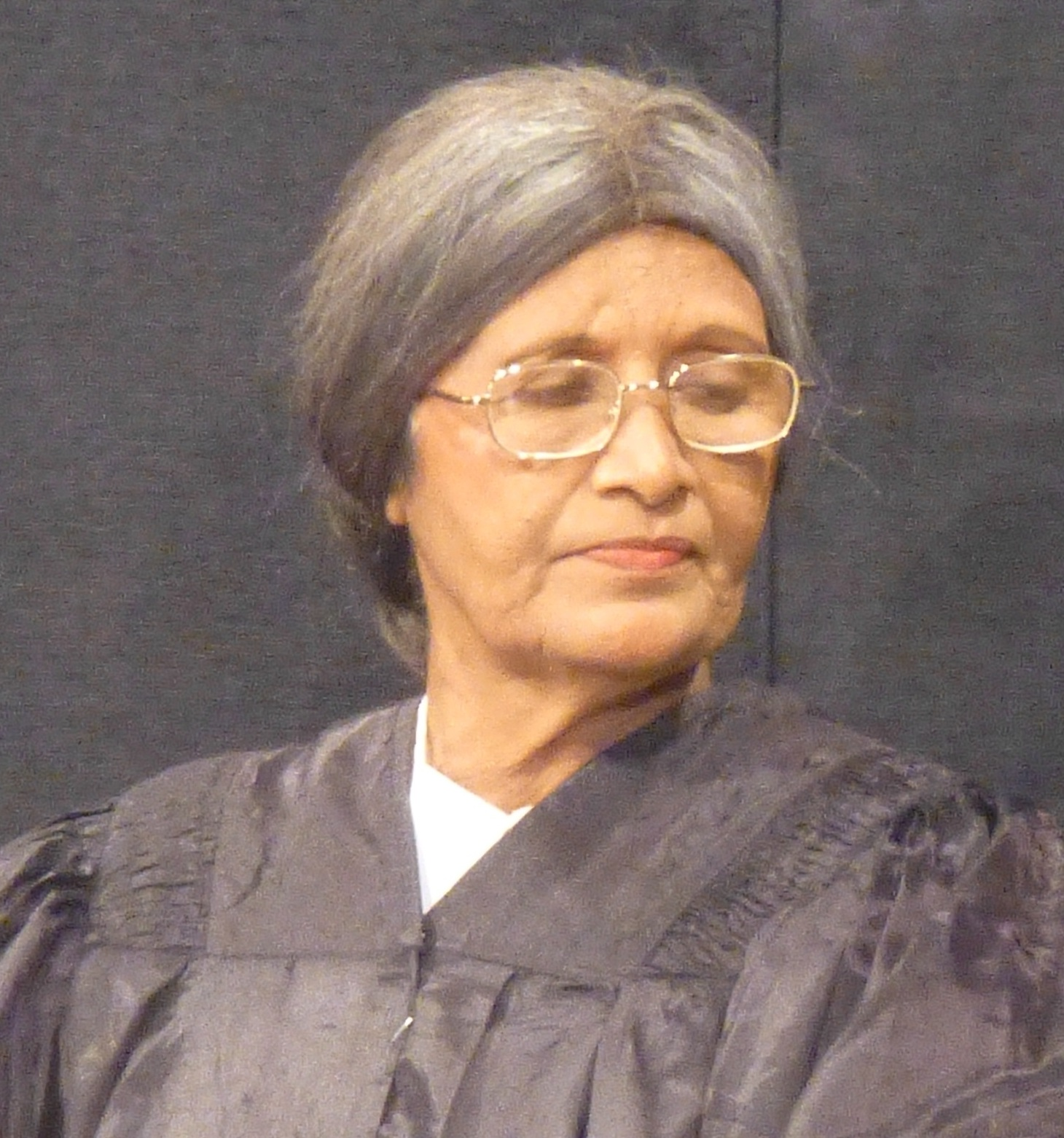
- Fernandes as a judge in the tiatr Pap Tujem Prachit Mhojem by Prince Jacob, 2013
- Born: Ubaldina Batista; 17 May 1942 (age 84); Navelim, Goa, Portuguese India, Portuguese Empire
- Occupations: Actress; singer
- Years active: 1949–2019
- Notable work: Padri (2005)

Ubaldina "Diana" Fernandes (née Batista; born 17 May 1942), also known mononymously as Diana, is an Indian actress and singer known for her work in Konkani films and tiatr (Goan musical theatre) productions.

== Career ==
Fernandes began her career in the Konkani stage in 1949, appearing in Minguel Rod's production of Open to Close. She has exhibited a diverse acting repertoire, adeptly portraying characters across a spectrum of genres that encompass both serious and comedic roles, highlighting her versatility as an actress. She was particularly active on the Konkani stage in the mid-1990s. Over the years, Fernandes has acted in several tiatrs, maintaining a long-standing collaboration with Prince Jacob's troupe since 1985. She has additionally shared the stage with veteran Konkani artists such as Anthony de Telaulim, a fellow performer, collaborating in local-level tiatrs within their community. In June 2017, Fernandes was cast in a Konkani film, Jacinto Cruz's DVD production titled Chori (Theft). In this film, she portrayed the role of a wicked mother, with a theater critic commended her acting, noting her portrayal of the villainous character with subtlety. Later that year in August, she was cast in Prince Jacob's tiatr Aao Jao Goa Tumhara (Come Go, Goa is Yours), playing the role of a Hindu wife named Sridevi. A theater critic commended her performance in the play, observing that she and her fellow actor harmonized convincingly as a married couple, showcasing their individual talents effectively on stage.

Fernandes has appeared in several Konkani-language theater productions known as tiatrs. In 2015, she was secured a role in the video film Hem Mhojem Ghor (This is My House), a production penned and directed by S. Caitan and distributed by Cat Video. Her portrayal in the film involved embodying the character of a local informant known for spreading rumors and news within the community. In March 2018, Fernandes was cast by director Michael Gracias in a revival of the tiatr Ghorabo (Family), which was originally written and staged by Nelson Afonso in the 1960s. In this production, Fernandes portrayed a spinster. The following month, in April 2018, Fernandes appeared in the tiatr Kazar.com by Prince Jacob. In her performance, she depicted an elderly and diligent character named Dolorosa who, alongside her spouse, operated a matrimonial agency named "Kazar.com". Later that year, in November 2018, Fernandes was again cast by Prince Jacob, this time in his tiatr Sun Hi-Fi, Sasumaim Wi-Fi (Daughter-in-law Hi-Fi, Mother-in-law Wi-Fi). In this production, she portrayed a comedian named Maggie, alongside actress Reema. A theater critic commented on the comedic talents of Reema and Diana in their respective roles as Macarena and Maggie, highlighting the abundance of laughter they brought to the performance.

In November 2014, Fernandes was cast in the tiatr Sukhant Toxem Dukhant by Prince Jacob, playing two roles - a teacher and a matron. The following year, in May 2015, she was again cast in Jacob's tiatr Kaxanvkar (Coffin Maker), this time as a comedian alongside fellow actor Cajetan de Curtorim. A theater critic named J. P. Pereira from The Navhind Times highlighted the comedic chemistry of the duo, portraying them as a pair that created several humorous scenarios during their acts. In August 2016, Fernandes embodied the character of a mature unmarried woman seeking a life partner in Jacob's tiatr Padri (Priest). This tiatr was initially staged as a non-stop show and later adapted into a feature film. Two years later, in August 2018, Fernandes reprised the role of Sridevi in the tiatr Amkam Kiteak Poddlam! (Why should we Bother?), which was a sequel to Prince Jacob's earlier work Aao, Jao, Goa Tumhara (2017). In a review by J. P. Pereira from The Navhind Times, Fernandes's portrayal as Sridevi was commended for entertaining the audience with a blend of wit and insightful observations.

In May 2011, Fernandes was cast in the tiatr Teg Bhav Deva Pav (Three Brothers, God Help Us) by Prince Jacob. In her performance, she assumed the character of Marialina, a comedic mother figure, responsible for the upbringing of Jaku (Prince Jacob) and Paku (Comedian Humbert). In December 2013, she was cast in another Jacob's tiatr Pap Tujem Prachit Mhojem (Your Sin, My Suffering), portraying the character of Laxmi, a swimming assistant coach with comic elements. Additionally in the same tiatr she played the role of a doctor and a judge. Fernandes continued to take on mother roles in subsequent tiatrs, appearing as a mother character in Maim Konnak Zai? (Who Wants a Mother?) by Prince Jacob in May 2016. In 2019, Fernandes was cast in two tiatrs. In the February lenten tiatr Tannem Mhaka Obixek Kela written by Valency D'Souza and directed by Michael Gracias, she played a friendly neighbor who had a compassionate personality but enjoyed engaging in gossip. Later that year in May, she appeared in Jacob's Ek Ghor Don Chulli (One House Two Stoves), she depicted a nosy neighbor who often interfered in others' affairs. In December 2021, Fernandes joined fellow veteran tiatrists Cyriaco Dias and Platilda Dias to inaugurate the 2nd International Tiatr Sammelan in Margao, Goa.

== Personal life ==
As of 2012, Fernandes resides at Saipem neighborhood in Candolim, Goa. In the aftermath of the COVID-19 pandemic, her engagement in Konkani theater has primarily revolved around attending public events associated with tiatrs. A recent occurrence took place in January 2023, when she was recognized, alongside seven other veteran tiatrists, by Dr. Austin D'Souza Prabhu, editor of Veez, a Konkani publication, at the commencement of the 3rd International Tiatr Convention organized by Kala Niketan Goa in Panaji, in acknowledgement for their contributions to the tiatr genre.
