= Padri (film) =

- Directed by: N. Rajesh Fernandis
- Written by: Prince Jacob
- Produced by: Raymond Quadros
- Starring: Newton D'Souza; Arona
- Cinematography: Yelukote Chandru
- Edited by: Bala Nayak
- Music by: Wilfy Rebimbus
- Distributed by: Prince Jacob Productions
- Release date: 30 September 2005
- Country: India
- Language: Konkani

Padri (translation: Priest) is a 2005 Konkani language film directed by Rajesh Fernandes and produced by Raymond Quadros. It stars Newton D'Souza and Arona Fernandes in the lead roles as protagonists and Kiran Kerkar, Thapan Acharya, and Annie Quadros in the supporting roles. Sundeep Malani plays a guest role in the film. The soundtrack and background score were composed by Wilfy Rebimbus. The film is based on a Goan play of the same title Padri, which was directed by Prince Jacob.

== Plot ==
Savio, Julies and Regan are three brothers growing up under the tutelage of their sister in law, Anushka. Savio intends to become a Padri (Priest), Julius ekes out a living in a business company, and Regan is an engineer. Anushka grew up in an aristocratic family and rules the house. Her uncle, Roldhawa, on a short visit, schemes and destroys the family's peace. Anushka is an unwitting pawn in her uncle's intrigues.

== Production ==
The film's idea came up when Rajesh Fernandes along with Raymond Quadros, during one of their visits to Goa, watched the play Padri by Prince Jacob. Soon, the idea of turning the play into a movie was born. The movie is unique in that all the actors and actresses acted on camera for the first time, but they are all professional stage artists. The whole movie was filmed in 2005 without a single indoor shot in 26 days. In all, "it is a package to be viewed by the entire family with model clippings and modern anecdotes", according to director Fernandes. The censor board has given ‘U’ certificate without a single cut, he added. He said that the language used in the movie is a mixture of Mangalorean Konkani and Goan Konkani.

== Cast ==
- Newton D'Souza
- Arona Fernandes
- Kiran Kerkar
- Tapan Acharya
- Annie Quadros as Anushka, the sister-in-law
- Prince Jacob
- John D' Silva
- Humbert
- Frank Coelho
- Diana Fernandes as old spinster
- Jacinth
- Justiniano Fernandes
- Roseferns
- Sundeep Malani (cameo appearance)

== Soundtrack ==
Lyrics and tunes were written by Wilfy Rebimbus.
