= Annie Quadros =

Actress and singer (born 1956)

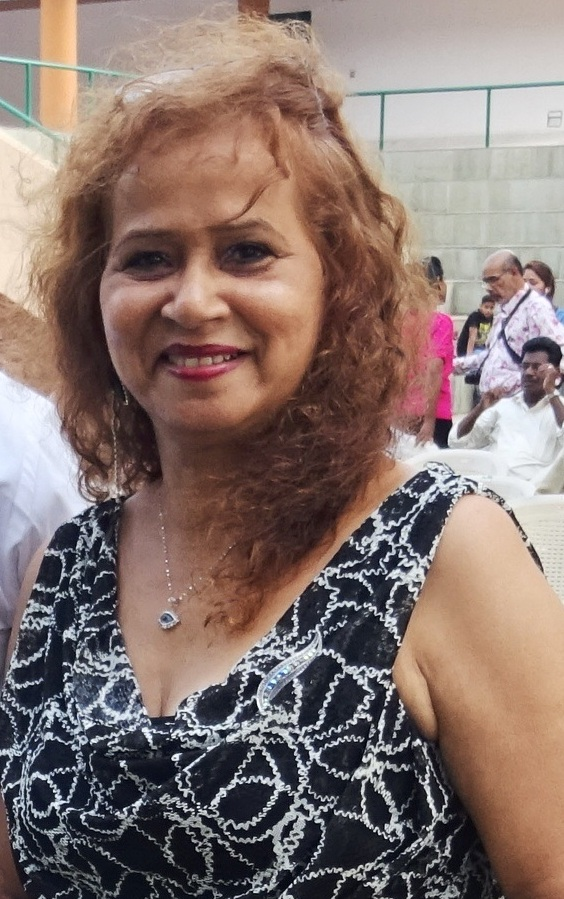
- Quadros at the Kala Academy, 2017
- Born: Any Piedade Josefa da Costa; 28 April 1956 (age 69); Calata, Goa, Portuguese India
- Other names: Pearl Annie
- Education: Secondary School Certificate (1975)
- Occupations: Actress; singer
- Years active: 1975–present
- Notable work: Padri (2005)
- Spouse: João Quadros (m. 1985)
- Children: 1
- Website: facebook.com/pearlannie.quadros

Any Piedade Josefa "Annie" Quadros (née da Costa; born 28 April 1956) is an actress and singer based in London, UK. She is known for her work in Konkani films and tiatr (theatre) productions. Referred to as the "Pearl of the Konkani stage", she made her debut in 1975 in R. Moraes' khell tiatrs playing lead roles in two productions. A versatile actress, she is known for her role in the Konkani film Padri (2005).

== Early life ==
Quadros was born as Any Piedade Josefa da Costa on 28 April 1956 in Calata, Goa, which was part of Portuguese India. She started her performing arts career in 1975, shortly after completing her Secondary School Certificate (SSC). During her time as a student, she had actively participated in various school plays, developing a passion for the stage. It was through a personal connection that she was introduced to the traditional Goan theatrical form known as tiatr.

On the 15 August 1975, Quadros marked her debut by assuming lead roles in two distinct tiatr productions, delivering them consecutively. During that era, the theatrical productions were commonly denoted as khell tiatrs and typically had a duration of approximately ninety minutes. In the play Darun Ostori, she portrayed a "vamp" character, while in the production Doth (Dowry), she depicted a character entangled in the issue of dowry, effectively conveying a range of emotions including sadness and anguish while on stage. Both plays, under the direction of R. Moraes, garnered critical acclaim and became popular among the audience. After her successful role in the acclaimed non-stop tiatr Doiall Kallzacho (Kind Hearted), under the direction of Patrick Dourado and with an all-female cast, she joined Rosario Rodrigues' theater troupe in 1978-79. Her performances in plays like Tum Aslo and Miss Aruna earned her acclaim and recognition during this period.

== Career ==
Quadros is a veteran performer on the Konkani stage, with a career spanning nearly four decades since the mid-1970s. Over the course of her career, she has embodied a diverse array of characters, encompassing roles like a widow, a troubled daughter-in-law, a champion of social causes, a nun, a legal representative, and a woman of wealth and privilege. Despite her versatility, she is known for her portrayal of the character Priti Mendonca in the tiatr (Konkani theater production) Amchea Gharant Tiatr (In Our House Tiatr), written by Prince Jacob in 2012. For more than twenty years, she has been a part of Jacob's ensemble, having become a member in the year 1987. Critics lauded her portrayal of Priti Mendonca, a character depicted as semi-literate, assertive wife, stringent mother, and excessively enthusiastic mother-in-law. Theater critic and writer Daniel F. de Souza lauded Quadros' interpretation of the character. Quadros' commitment to the role went beyond her performance, as she also contributed to designing the character's wardrobe to enhance the overall portrayal.

Quadros is known for her acting and singing contributions. In 2011, she was cast in the tiatr Teg Bhav Deva Pav (Three Brothers, God Help Us) by Prince Jacob, portraying the character of Asuntin. The Times of India's Pio Esteves praised her portrayal of a mother in this production. She continued her tiatr work in 2013, appearing in two productions. In March of that year, she was cast in Simon Gonsalves' lenten tiatr Government of God, playing the role of the guardian character Sandra. She also sang as part of this performance. Later in December 2013, Quadros was featured in Prince Jacob's tiatr Pap Tujem Prachit Mhojem (Your Sin, My Suffering), where she took on the part of Goretti and contributed vocals. Quadros' tiatr acting resume expanded further in 2015 when she was cast in Simon Gonsalves' lenten production Jezuchem Povitr Rogot (Jesus's Holy Blood). For this work, she portrayed the role of Nacia, which The Times of India's Marcus Mergulhao described as an "egoistic and unforgiving" performance that delighted audiences.

Quadros has appeared in several Konkani theater (tiatr) productions over the years. In August 2015, she was cast in the tiatr Mhojem Kalliz Roddtta (My Heart Cries) by George Dias, portraying the role of a mother. The following year, in April 2016, she was selected to play the role of a widow named Veronica in Prince Jacob's tiatr Kaxanvkar (Coffin Maker). Additionally, she contributed a song performance to the production. The writer and critic Michael Gracias praised Quadros' work in this tiatr. She continued her acting career in the tiatr medium, and in April 2017 she was cast in Jacob's tiatr Padri (Priest), where she played one of the lead roles of a widow named Angela. She also sang a song as part of this production. Most recently, in July 2018, Quadros was featured in the tiatr Tujem Bhangar, Tujeach Angar (Your Gold on Your Body), portraying the role of an egoistic mother named Rebecca. For this performance, she collaborated with the actor Michael, singing a duet together.

In 2018, Quadros appeared in several performances. In January 2018, she had a role in the Konkani language film Planning Devachen (Planning of God). The direction of the film was attributed to Rajesh Fernandes, while the production was managed by Severino Fernandes. The following month, in February 2018, she was cast in the tiatr (Konkani theatrical performance) Fight For Right, directed by Comedian Agostinho. In the film, the character played by her was of Dr. Ruth Mendonsa, a medical professional who is suspected of participating in unethical behavior at the hospital where she works. Quadros also participated in a trio musical performance during the opening of the tiatr, singing alongside Benny de Aldona and Comedienne Janet. A theatre critic reviewing the production praised Quadros's portrayal of the corrupt medical practitioner. Later in 2018, in March, Quadros appeared in another tiatr, Happy Easter, directed by Jr Reagan. In this work, she played the role of Home Minister Dilaila, described as a wicked government minister. Quadros's performance in this part was also well received by theatre critics.

== Personal life ==
Quadros is married. Together they have one daughter, Keisha. Quadros has shared her perspectives on several issues, including the theater scene in Goa. She observed that many youths demonstrated a keen interest in participating in tiatrs, a culturally significant form of theatrical expression native to Goa. She advised for these budding actors to actively engage with the diverse training opportunities and resources at their disposal to enhance their skills and proficiency in this traditional art form.

According to Quadros, workshops focused on skills such as acting technique, costume and make-up design, vocal training, stage presence, and delivery of dialogue can be beneficial for those interested in pursuing tiatr performance. She has noted that access to such specialized training was more limited during her own early career in the performing arts.

As of 2012, Quadros resides in the neighborhood of Dongor Waddo in the suburb of Fatorda, Goa. As of February 2023, she is based in London, UK.

Throughout her career, Quadros has taken on lead roles in tiatr productions that have made an impact on audiences. One such example is her starring role in the tiatr Rodonaka (Don't Cry), directed by Prince Jacob. In the context of this production, her portrayal of a character linked to a non-governmental organization resonated with the audience, resulting in individuals reaching out to her directly to confide in her about their own dilemmas and anxieties. Her work as a tiatrist has taken her on extensive travels, both within India and internationally. Over the years, she has performed tiatr in a number of countries outside of India, including Bahrain, Muscat, Dubai, Kuwait, Qatar, and London.
