= Mario Menezes =

Indian director and actor (1960–2022)

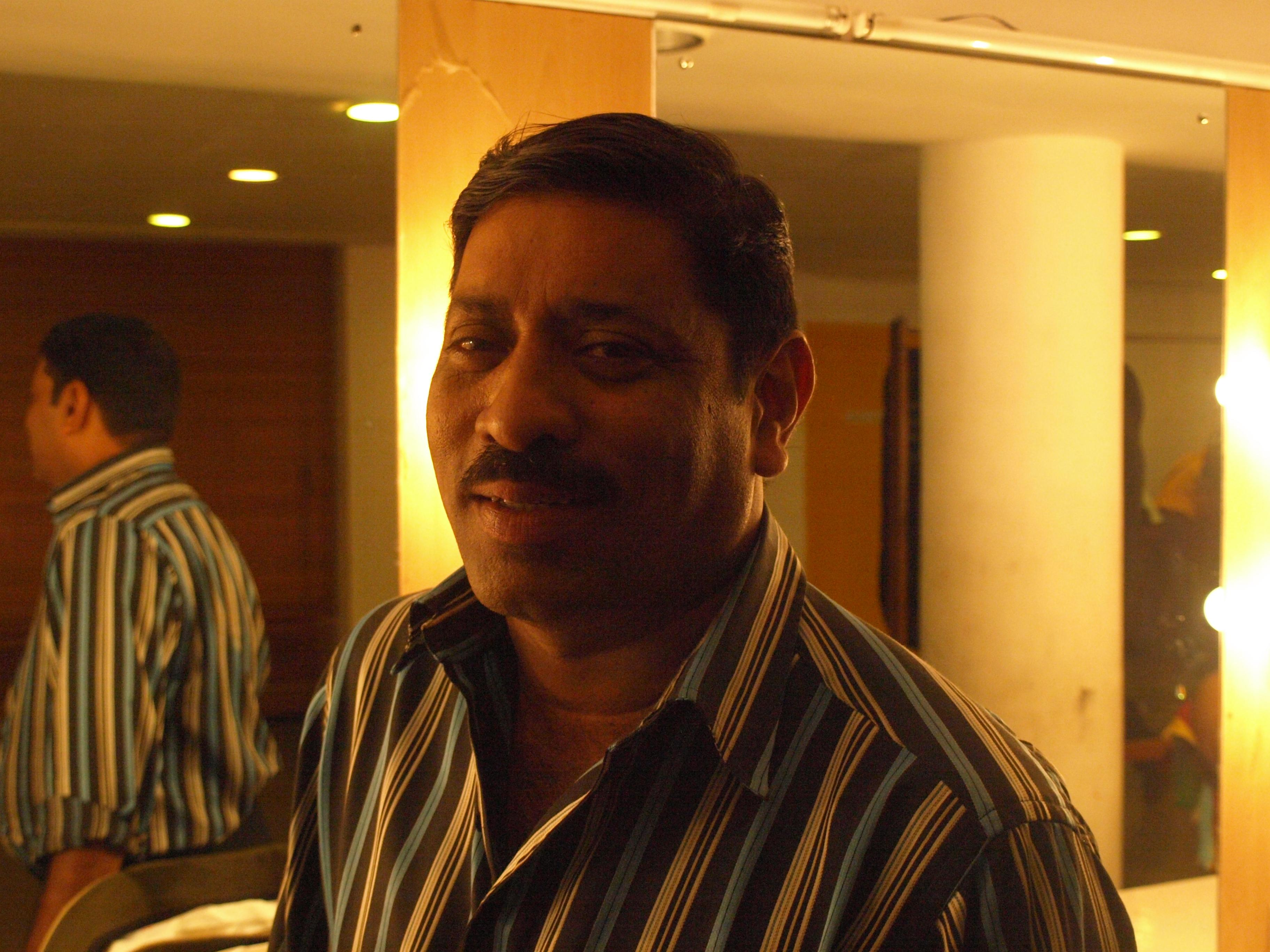
- Menezes in 2010
- Born: Mario Piedade Menezes; 29 May 1960; Chinchinim, Goa, Portuguese India, Portuguese Empire (now in India)
- Died: 25 June 2022 (aged 62); Chiplun, Maharashtra, India
- Burial place: Our Lady of Hope Church cemetery, Chinchinim, Goa, India
- Other name: Tragedy King
- Occupations: Actor; theatre director; writer
- Years active: 1982–2022
- Spouse: Epiphania Menezes
- Children: 2

Mario Piedade Menezes (29 May 1960 – 25 June 2022), popularly known by his sobriquet Tragedy King, was an Indian theatre director, playwright, and actor who primarily worked on the Konkani stage. He was the vice president of the Tiatr Academy Goa.

== Career ==
Menezes made his debut as a professional tiatrist in 1982. He was part of Rosario Rodrigues' troupe and was a long time member of Prince Jacob's troupe before starting out as an independent director and forming his own troupe "Menezes Theatre" in 2001. Menezes has also acted in tiatrs by directors like Roseferns, Comedian Agostinho, Jose Rod, Pascoal Rodrigues, Patrick Dourado, Ligorio Fernandes and Menino De Bandar. Menezes staged tiatrs in India as well as in other countries including the United Kingdom and Gulf nations like Kuwait. In 2018, he produced a tiatr with 25 children cast of leading tiatrists in Goa acting in it. Menezes prior to his death had directed nearly 50 tiatrs and performed in about 10,000 shows during his career.

== Personal life ==
Mario Piedade Menezes was born on 29 May 1960 in Chinchinim, Goa, which was then part of Portuguese India during the Portuguese Empire (now in India), to Leopoldino and Esmeralda Menezes. He was married to Epiphania Menezes.Together, they had two daughters, Rioma and Riosha.

== Awards and honours ==
Menezes won the 2014 Dalgado Konknni Akademi Annual Dalgado Cultural Award for his contribution to the development of Konkani in the Roman script. He has also been honoured as the Best Actor (1981), Best Director and Best Performance (1992), "Goa Bandh" and Best Duo with Lawry Travasso in 2002 at Kala Academy Tiatr Festival.

In 1985, Menezes was awarded the Gulab Best Actor for "Amchem Ghor", Best Director for "He Chukik Bogsonem asa?" in 2001, for "Tiatr Somplo Cholat Ghara" in 2003, for "Tanchem Chintat Tevui Munxeam" in 2005 and Best Writer for "Sangat Ami Burguim Khonachim" in 2004 and for "Tanchem Chintat Tevui Munxean" in 2005. Menezes is also the recipient of the Dr Jack Sequeira Award for Best Director for "Kal Aiz Ani Falleam in 2009, for Beiman Kir" in 2010, for "Hatachin Panch Bottam" in 2011 and Best Tiatr for "Maim Tuka Khoim Soddum" in 2012 Best Actor for "Beiman Kir" in 2010.

He was amongst the first three in all editions of the Tiatr Academy of Goa Popular Tiatr Festival. In the first year, he won First Place for Best Actor and Best Director and second place for Script and Performance for "Beiman Kir". In the second year, he won awards for 'Futtleli Boxi" and in the third year he won the first place for negative role in "Xirlo".

In the fourth Year of Tiatr Academy Popular Tiatr Festival, he won the first place for Writer, Director and Performance for "Hi Vatt Khoim Veta" and the following year he won the second place for Director, Script and Performance for "Kollxear Udok". In the sixth year of the awards, he won the second place for performance and third place for director for "Eke Fottik Xembhor Fotti". The Goa Konkani Akademi also awarded him for Best Script for Tanchem Chintat Tivui Munxeam.

== Death ==
Menezes died as a result of massive heart attack at Chiplun, Maharashtra, while he was en route to Mumbai. He was on his way by train along with Menino de Bandar's troupe for a tiatr performance. His funeral was attended by hundreds of fans and dignitaries.

== Selected stage works ==
Year	Title	Role	Ref
2022	Thank You		
2018	Bhurgem Tem Bhurgem		
2016	Toh Porot Yetolo		
2015	Suknneachem Ghor Ghontter Nhoi		
2015	Amkam Kiteak Poddla		
2011	Rogtacho Rong Tambdo		
2020	Ho Uzo Palounk Zata	Writer & director	
2017	Ghor Nhoi Ghorabo	Actor, writer & director	
	Moronk Pasun Suseg Nam	Actor, producer, writer & director	
	Goem Konn Samballtolo		
	Sorry		
	Renver Bandlelem Ghor		
	Don Roste		
	Hi Vatt Khoim Veta?		
	Bendol		
	Xirlo		
	Apurbaiechim Fulam		
	Aslelim Dukhi Naslelim Sukhi		
	Beiman Kir		
	Bhurgem Tem Bhurgem		
	College Life		
	Dev Konn? Hindu, Kristanv Vo Musolman		
	Dogui Bodmas		
	Don Roste		
	Duddu Anik Ginean		
	Eke Fottik Xembhor Fotti		
	Fattim Pavlem		
	Fattlean Poi		
	Floriano Vaz – Poilo Martyr		
	Futtleli Boxi		
	Ghor Nhoi Ghorabo		
	Ghorabeache Vantte		
	Grandpa		
	Hatachim Panch Bottam		
	He Roste Chukiche		
	Hevui Chukik Bhogsonnem Assa		
	Hevui Chukik Bhogsonnem Nam		
	Hevui Chukik Bhogsonnem Assa – Part II		
	Hi Kudd Matiek Laitam		
	Hi Maim Konnachi		
	Ho Uzo Palounk Zata		
	Kaide Konnak Keleat?		
	Kal Aiz Ani Faleam		
	Kazari Put Konnacho?maicho Vo Bailecho?		
	Love Story 2009		
	Naginn		
	Nhoim Mogache Pun Rogtache		
	Omtea Kollxear Udok		
	Osleo Suno		
	Padri		
	Padri Mogan Poddla...		
	Pai		
	Pangllo		
	Papi		
	Parvo		
	Passport		
	Patkam		
	Peddo		
	Pergaum		
	Pidda		
	Piso		
	Pisuddlelim Fulam		
	Podvi		
	Poixe Poixe		
	Poltodd		
	Pontti		
	Pordexi		
	Posko		
	Prachit		
	Put		
	Rag		
	Randdponn		
	Raza-rani		
	Rogot		
	Rogtacho Rong Tambddo		
	Rosto		
	Rupia		
	Somaz Osso Cholta		
	Sonvsarant Konn Nhoim Konnacho		
	Suicide		
	Sukhachi Zalim Dukham		
	Sukhnneachem Ghor Ghontter Nhoi		
	Tem Tuka Naka		
	Tempa Pormonnem		
	Tiatr Somplo Cholat Ghara		
	To Porot Yetolo		
	Tum Tujea Jivitacho Boroinnar		
	Tumi Tumche Dolle Ugddat		
