= Premanand Lotlikar =

Indian businessman and actor (born 1954)

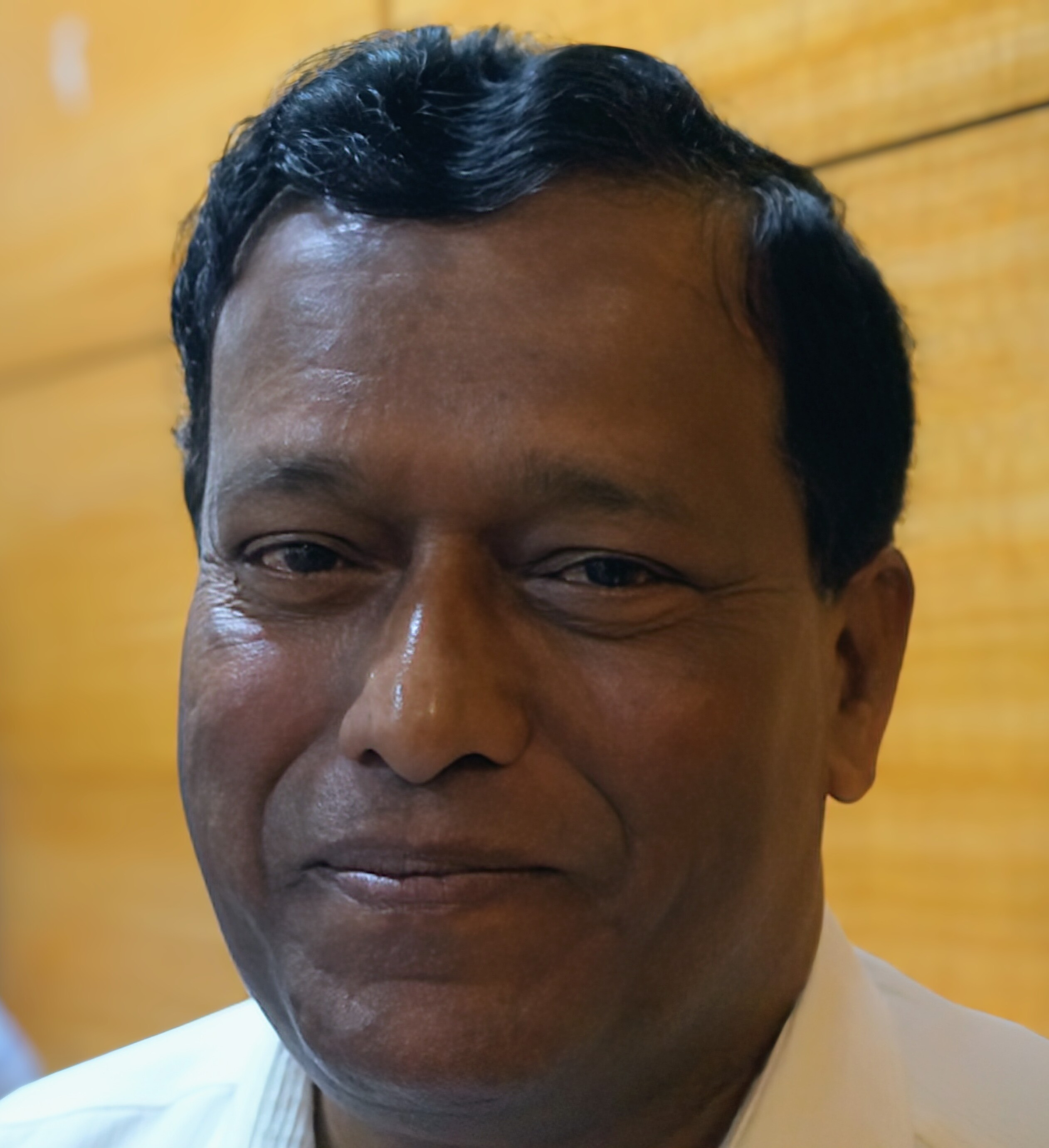
- Lotlikar in 2015
- Born: 14 July 1954 (age 72); Margão, Goa, Portuguese India
- Citizenship: India (from 1961)
- Education: Parvatibai Chowgule College (B.A.)
- Occupations: Businessman; actor; director; playwright
- Years active: 1976–1997
- Employer: Life Insurance Corporation of India
- Organisation: Dalgado Konknni Akademi
- Spouse: Priti Lotlikar (m. 1983)
- Children: 1
- Awards: Man of the Year (1987)

President of Dalgado Konknni Akademi
- In office 18 December 2008 – January 2017
- Preceded by: Tomazinho Cardozo
- Succeeded by: Tomazinho Cardozo
- Website: premanandlotlikar.com

Premanand Anand Lotlikar (born 14 July 1954) is an Indian former actor, theatre director, playwright, insurance agent, and businessman known for his work in tiatr (theatre) productions.

== Early life ==
Premanand Anand Lotlikar was born on 14 July 1954 in Margão, Goa, then part of Portuguese India, to Anand Lotlikar, a small-scale goldsmith from Macasana, and Premabai Anand Lotlikar, a homemaker. He was the second of four children in the family. Lotlikar was educated in Marathi during his primary schooling at Holy Trinity High School in Benaulim. During his time at school, he noticed that certain classmates, like Roseferns and Christopher Leitao, were engaged in cultural endeavors. During his school years, Lotlikar performed in one-act plays at cultural events and annual day celebrations held by the educational institution. After completing his primary education, he went on to earn a Bachelor of Arts degree from Parvatibai Chowgule College in Margao.

Throughout his time in school, Lotlikar was involved in Marathi theatrical activities in Goa, taking part in various productions at venues such as the Lakshmi Mandir in Benaulim and Margao. Through this association, he encountered N. Shivdas, a writer, known for his role as a teacher at a state-run primary school situated in Benaulim. Shivdas was both a playwright and director for two Konkani theatrical productions, The Prince, and Pisantt, in which both Lotlikar and Roseferns took on acting roles. These plays were later part of a drama competition held by the Kala Academy.

Lotlikar's early theatrical experience and connections within the local drama community got him interested in Goan performance arts. However, financial constraints initially prevented him from pursuing a career as a professional tiatrist. It was only later, when he began assisting his father Anand in his new roles as a candle seller and a vendor of moong konn (a Goan sweet he sold during tiatrs), that he developed a familiarity with and appreciation for Goa's tiatr tradition.

== Career ==
During the early stages of his career, Lotlikar's contemporaries Roseferns and Christopher Leitao were enlisted into the theatrical ensemble under the leadership of Ligorio Fernandes. Roseferns wrote and produced a Konkani theater performance (tiatr) called Nimnni Chitt (Last Letter), which was showcased at the Dandear Ground in Colva. Lotlikar played a villainous part in this theatrical production. Roseferns then wrote another tiatr named Avaz (Voice). This theatrical piece was showcased at Maria Hall located in Benaulim, with Lotlikar portraying a paraplegic character. Ligorio, an observer of the production, identified Lotlikar's acting abilities during the performance. At the time, Ligorio's own tiatr, Judas, was touring across Goa. Following 24 presentations, the lead performer chose to leave the production to pursue career opportunities in the Gulf region. Ligorio then approached Lotlikar to step in as a substitute performer. Lotlikar, who was then a singer known for his performances in Marathi theatre, acknowledged his lack of prior experience in singing "kantaram," a distinctive style of Konkani theater songs, on the Konkani stage.

Lotlikar is known for his performances across a range of leading and supporting roles. His career as a tiatrist, or tiatr performer, spanned several decades and saw him collaborate with many of the directors and producers in the medium. His breakthrough performance came in Ligorio's theatrical presentation Judas, at the play's 25th anniversary, that was performed at the Gomant Vidya Niketan in Margao, Goa. His lead role in this production helped establish him as a tiatrist within the Goan arts community. The Judas tiatr led to a wider touring schedule, with Lotlikar reprising his role in productions across the cities of Bombay, Pune, and various regions of Karnataka. Over the course of this tour, he is reported to have completed approximately 40 additional performances of the play.

Lotlikar's repertoire grew alongside director Ligorio's tiatr troupe. He appeared in several of Ligorio's productions, including Papi (Sinner), Jesudas, Julius Caesar, and Jesmina, various performances were held across Goa, Bombay, and Pune. Lotlikar was subsequently cast in two of director A. M. Pacheco's productions, Lolo (Simpleton) and Fator (Stone). Over the course of his career, Lotlikar collaborated with a wide range of tiatr directors and performers, including Patrick Dourado, M. Boyer, Premanand Sangodkar, Jacinto Vaz, and Rosario Rodrigues.

Lotlikar, after gaining some experience, chose to produce and present his own tiatr shows. In 1987, he inaugurated his self-directed tiatr production named Loz ani Dukh. This was followed by two more productions in 1988, Dovi Fott ani Kallem Sot and Povitr Papi. The following year, 1989, saw the debut of two additional Lotlikar-directed tiatrs, Rup vo Rupnnem and Zindabad. He continued this pace, offering Ho Mhozo Oprad in 1990 and concluding his self-directed tiatrs with Borem Zainaka in 1991. Despite his popularity in the tiatr domain, he found that his own productions did not translate into financial gains or a reliable livelihood. This realization led him to cease directing his own tiatrs. However, in 1993, he returned to the stage, accepting a role in Rosario Rodrigues' tiatr Tuzo Hath Di. In this production, Lotlikar by portraying a triple role, encompassing comedy, negative characters, and tragedy. Following this, the veteran tiatr director A. M. Pacheco revived his production Fator, once again featuring Lotlikar in the lead role.

Lotlikar pursued a career in the private sector, as a life insurance agent. In 1997, he launched his own agency for the Life Insurance Corporation of India (LIC) in Margao. Lotlikar remained active in this profession for over two decades. Prior to starting his insurance agency, he established contact with Nolasco de Gama, a former LIC manager in Mumbai. De Gama then referred Lotlikar to a person named Cardozo from Verna, Goa, who proceeded to offer guidance to Lotlikar as he transitioned into the life insurance industry. Beyond his primary vocation, Lotlikar participated in various community organizations and initiatives. He has been a member of the Dalgado Konknni Akademi (DKA) since its founding in 1988. He was first elected president of the DKA on 16 December 2008, and held this position on three separate occasions until January 2017. Additionally, he was involved with the Motorcycle Action Group and various community social service organizations.

== Personal life ==
Lotlikar married Maria Blaudina Arcadia Rodrigues, a fellow tiatrist and Goan Catholic from Colva, Goa. After their marriage, Maria converted to Hinduism and changed her name to Priti Premanand Lotlikar. Lotlikar and Priti have been close friends since childhood. They have a daughter, Pritam, who is an advocate.

As of 2018, Lotlikar, along with his family, resides in the neighborhood of Chinchmorod, Vanelim in Colva, where he spent most of his childhood. He has been a long-time advocate for Romi Konkani.
