= Tommy Afonso =

Portuguese singer and actor (born 1960)

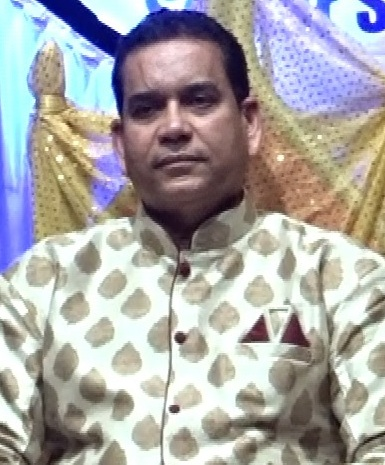
- Afonso in 2017
- Born: Tomás António Afonso; 20 March 1960 (age 66); Vasco da Gama, Goa, Portuguese India
- Other name: Jr. Nelson
- Occupations: Singer; actor; composer; playwright
- Years active: 1980s–present
- Spouse: Chitra Afonso (m. 1990)
- Father: Nelson Afonso

Tomás António Afonso (born 20 March 1960), also known as Jr. Nelson, is a Portuguese singer, theatre actor, composer, and playwright based in Southall, England. He is known for his work in tiatr productions, having initially earned fame as a member of the Trio Kings, a musical trio. The son of singer Nelson Afonso, he is involved in promoting amateur tiatrists in the UK.

== Early life ==
Tomás António Afonso was born on 20 March 1960 in Vasco da Gama, Goa, which was part of Portuguese India during the Portuguese Empire (now in India), to Nelson Afonso, a Konkani singer and playwright. His paternal grandmother, Evelina Cardoso e Afonso, was not only a homemaker but also possessed vocal abilities. According to historian and writer Wilson Mazarello, Evelina was recognized as a "good singer", a talent that was passed down to her son Nelson.

== Career ==
Historian Wilson Mazarello has observed that Afonso's musical creations and individual vocal presentations have garnered acclaim from audiences involved in the tiatr scene. In addition to his solo career, Afonso was a former member of the popular musical trio, the Trio Kings, known for their acclaimed trio performances that captivated audiences throughout the area. As per Mazarello, Afonso is known for his stage presence and ability to embody heroic roles effectively due to his "commanding physical demeanor". Throughout the 1990s, Afonso was frequently cast in leading acting parts in tiatrs directed by several popular Goan directors, including Prem Kumar and C. Alvares, among others.

Beyond his stage work, Afonso has also maintained an active recording career, having released several popular audio recordings. He has contributed his singing talents to various audio cassette recordings as well. Afonso's solo audio cassette released in the mid-1990s gained popularity among audiences. He has also garnered attention for his extensive touring as a tiatrist, having traveled widely both within India and abroad to perform. In February 2018, he composed a special opening song that marked the 125th anniversary of the tiatr tradition and paid tribute to his father, the late tiatr playwright and singer Nelson Afonso. This commemorative composition was featured in a revival production of Nelson Afonso's classic tiatr Ghorabo (Family)" originally staged in the 1960s, directed by Michael Gracias.

Afonso has appeared in several Konkani tiatrs, a form of Goan theatre. In January 2012, he was cast in the tiatr Puro Tumi Hansleat Tim (Enough of Your Laugh), directed by Comedian Agostinho. Afonso portrayed the role of Diniz, an elderly father, in this production. He also performed a trio with Jaju Fernandes and Filipe Almeida titled "Amche Montri" and a solo song called "Nelson Afonso" about his father. The theatrical performance examined the challenges encountered by elderly individuals at the hands of their offspring, often exacerbated by the actions of their daughters-in-law. In November 2018, the High Commission of India, London held a Konkani program for the first time, as a contribution to the communal harmony and national integration week organized by Goan expatriates based in the United Kingdom. Afonso wrote and delivered a musical composition focusing on the ideals of fostering unity among different communities and promoting national integration during the event. In March 2020, Afonso was cast in a supporting role in the Lenten-themed tiatr Kal Aiz Sodankal (Today Tomorrow and Forever), directed by Willy Silveira. For this production, Afonso sang his own solo songs "Parrikarachi Samadhi" and "Aiz Mhozo Ho Bhes". The tiatr delved into subjects such as unfaithfulness, illicit relationships, pride, allure, and absolution within the context of a family environment.

Afonso claims that he is the first professional tiatrist who moved to London, UK, in 2004, as a Portuguese citizen and settled there. Tiatrs in the UK have since then been staged a lot and grown exponentially, as per his claim. During the early 2000s, Konkani Dramatic Association (KDA) and GCS (now a defunct organization) would organize the tiatrs in the UK. KDA would focus on bringing tiatrs from Goa to London, UK, whereas GCS did not follow a similar pursuit but worked for the promotion of tiatrs and Goa. As of August 2023, Afonso also does compering during intervals in tiatr productions, with his most recent work being with director Comedian Richard who staged his production in Southall, England. Afonso also claims that tiatrs are staged more in London than in his home state of Goa. As a singer, Afonso avoids singing criticism about anyone, and if he has written any, he does not hold any personal grudge against that person. Afonso also claims that he never visited any Goan politicians regarding donations or any support for his tiatr productions that he penned on his own, although as a playwright, he was not very successful.

Afonso, as a singer, was part of a trio called the Trio Kings, which had several fellow co-singers over the years. When Afonso and his fellow singers performed on the Konkani stage, they would repeat their performance only once and would not perform more than one repeat performance in a particular tiatr. Afonso also does not prefer to ask about the critics of his performance or whether he played his part well. He has also been quite open with his criticism of Goan politicians but has not named any specific individuals, incorporating his views into his songs by sometimes singing political songs. Afonso claims that many tiatrists have recently moved to London, UK, with a goal to create controversies involving politics in their tiatr productions. On the other hand, Afonso prefers not to indulge in "dirty politics" and has been working on creating a Tiatr Academy in London, similar to the Tiatr Academy of Goa, with Fr. Lucas Rodrigues, the parish priest of St. Peter and Paul Parish in Mitcham. Afonso claims that the Government of the United Kingdom can help a lot in creating a Tiatr Academy if one knows how to properly implement the funds and tap into the benefits of the government, even though the initial setup may be difficult.

Afonso is also involved in promoting Goan youth tiatrists, bringing their tiatrs from Goa to Swindon, England. As a singer, he has a very short-term memory and usually relies on prompting from Bab Andrew, a fellow tiatrist based in the UK. During his youth as a singer of the Trio Kings fame, when Afonso left the trio, he would collaborate with popular Konkani performers like C. Alvares. Among Afonso's popular solos is one he mentioned called "Tandoori chicken," which many Goans during the late 20th century did not know the meaning of. His other popular solos include "Madd" (meaning Coconut tree). During that era, many songs were not written about topics like coconut trees, so his songs were an inspiration to other Konkani singers, some of whom copied his song format, while others wrote songs on similar topics to Afonso. Speaking more about his song compositions, Afonso explains that his songs are based on facts and not stories, usually conveying a message to the audience, often discussing God in his songs.

== Personal life ==
As of 1995, Afonso resided with his family in Vasco da Gama, Goa. He later moved to Southall, England, in 2004 after obtaining his Portuguese citizenship.

His wife, Chitra, after her marriage to Afonso, ventured into tiatrs, following similar pursuits as her husband by becoming a singer and actor. One of her memorable roles was in Prem Kumar's tiatr Vauraddi (The Labourer). Afonso maintains a friendship with his fellow Konkani stage artiste, Bab Andrew, who is based in the UK.
