= Jaju Fernandes =

Indian actor and singer (1960–2023)

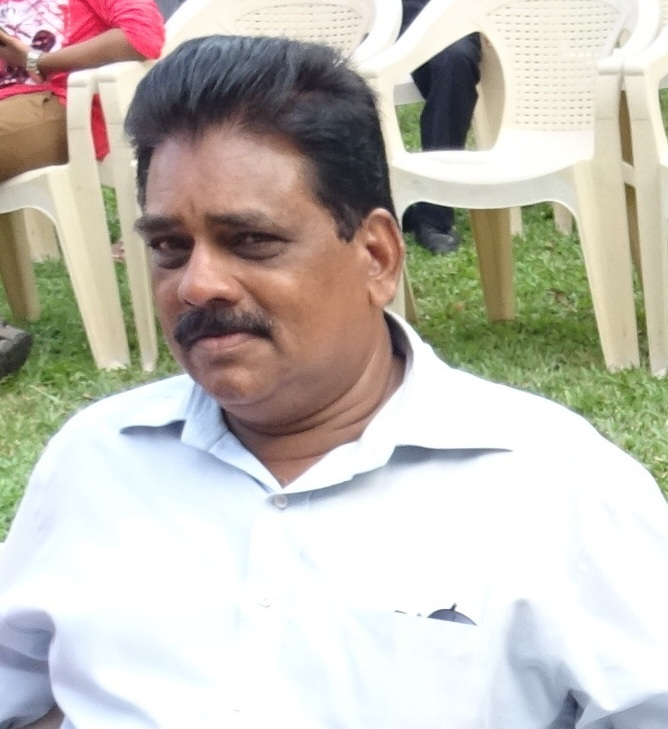
- Fernandes at the Kala Academy, 2017
- Born: Joaquim João Fernandes; 29 September 1960; Benaulim, Goa, Portuguese India
- Died: 11 April 2023 (aged 62); Benaulim, Goa, India
- Burial place: Holy Trinity Church cemetery, Benaulim, Goa, India
- Other names: Joaquim J Fernandes; Dada
- Occupations: Actor; singer
- Years active: 1980–2023
- Organisation: Goa Football Association
- Spouse: Antonieta Goes (m. 1982)
- Children: 4, including Brandon
- Relatives: Roseferns (brother)
- Website: facebook.com/jaju.fernandes

Joaquim João "Jaju" Fernandes (29 September 1960 – 11 April 2023), also mononymously known as Jaju or Dada (transl. Father), was an Indian actor and singer known for his work in Konkani films and tiatr (theatre) productions. He made his professional debut in the 1980 tiatr Thapott (Slap) by his elder brother, Roseferns. Following this, he became known for playing both serious and comedic main characters, traditionally those of a father, antagonist, or police officer. In his later years, he took on the role of a football agent during his son Brandon Fernandes's early football career.

== Early life ==
Joaquim João Fernandes was born on 29 September 1960 in the village of Benaulim, Goa, which was part of Portuguese India during the Portuguese Empire, to carpenter Joaquim Mariano Fernandes and homemaker Maria Remediana Edoenca Fernandes, who hailed from Colva, into a Goan Catholic family. Fernandes originated from a village known for its tradition of tiatrists.

== Career ==
In 1980, Fernandes commenced his career in the Konkani theatrical domain by participating in the non-stop tiatr production titled Thapott (Slap), orchestrated by his brother Roseferns. This marked the inception of his association with the Roseferns Dramatic Troupe. Thapott achieved success, entertaining audiences for more than a century with its performances. Throughout his career, Fernandes left a mark with his memorable portrayals, garnering acclaim not only for his villainous roles but also for his adeptness in comedic characters. He donned multiple hats, embodying diverse roles, be it that of a father figure, antagonist, or law enforcement officer. In 2010, Fernandes joined forces with fellow tiatrist Comedian Agostinho's troupe for the theatrical production of Advogad (Advocate), which led to a series of popular tiatrs including Interview, Police, Public, and Fight for Right. Fernandes subsequently rejoined his brother Roseferns' troupe, lending his talent to their 98th production, Atam Yeyat (Now Come), followed by the 99th production, Jevnnant Fator (Stone in food), the 100th production, Amche Modem Jiyeta (Dwelling within us), and finally, the 101st production, Ek Nam Ek Dis (One day or the other). Consequently, Fernandes made a firm commitment to further assist his brother in their future projects in the tiatr production industry.

Fernandes was a multifaceted artist known for his contributions as both an actor and a singer. He showcased his vocal prowess in several audio albums produced by Konkani artists such as Roseferns, Pascoal, Saby de Divar, and others. Within the realm of acting, Fernandes made an impact by starring in a variety of Konkani films, including works like Ek Vat Mennachi, Vankddo Tinkddo Mog, Old Age Home, and Public, among others. Furthermore, Fernandes ventured into the realm of production, releasing the Konkani CD Xim, where he demonstrated his skills in different venues in India, including Goa, Mumbai, and Pune, as well as internationally in Kuwait, Bahrain, Muscat, Qatar, Dubai, and the United Kingdom. Known for his versatility, Fernandes embraced a diverse range of roles, portraying characters that spanned the spectrum from negative to positive, with a particular flair for paternal figures and comedic portrayals. His performances were characterized by a distinctive style and dynamic presence, infusing the stage with an infectious energy. Throughout his career, Fernandes actively collaborated with a multitude of directors and showcased his talents in theatrical productions spanning the Gulf region, London, and Europe. He was regarded for his constructive suggestions to fellow actors and his warm, inviting demeanor.

On 10 April 2023, Fernandes participated in the 102nd production by Roseferns titled Hem Oxench Choltolem? (Will this work?) at Arambol, marking his final performance. In this production, Fernandes demonstrated his versatility by playing two different characters – a driver and the chairman of the Educational Board. Meena Goes, a member of the troupe, praised Fernandes for his strong presence on stage during the entire show. Following the conclusion of the performance, the troupe headed back home at approximately 1:30 am. Fernandes's contributions extended beyond his role as a tiatrist. He held positions as an executive member and former assistant secretary of the Goa Football Association (GFA) and was a founding member of the Konkani Non-Stop Tiatristanchi Sonstha (KNTS). Fernandes had a lengthy tenure as a member of the GFA, having initially been elected to the organization in 1993. He actively participated in the organization's operations, particularly in managing leagues and tournaments catering to different age groups. Fernandes's artistic journey encompassed a body of work, including more than 125 tiatrs/khell-tiatrs. He collaborated with Konkani directors such as Roseferns, Comedian Agostinho, and Tony Dias.

Fernandes gained acclaim for his performances in tiatrs, a form of traditional Goan theater, including productions such as Dhovo Kanvllo (White Crow), Ghantt (Ghat), Government of God, Police, and Mahanand. Recognizing his son's talent ahead of others, Fernandes played a pivotal role in shaping Brandon's career, ultimately establishing him as one of India national football team's midfielders. In a period where options for international training were limited, Fernandes chose to send Brandon to the ASD Football Academy in South Africa. This decision gave Brandon a special opportunity to demonstrate his abilities to Premier League clubs like Leicester City, Reading F.C., and Sunderland A.F.C. during trial sessions. In addition to his contributions to his son's career, Fernandes served as the chairman of the GFA (Goa Football Association) futsal committee, further demonstrating his commitment to the sport. His knowledge and negotiation skills even led him to assume the role of a football agent, overseeing the contractual affairs of Brandon during the early stages of his professional journey.

== Personal life ==
Fernandes's elder brother, Roseferns, is also active on the Konkani stage as a theatre director and actor. On 15 September 1982, Fernandes had a civil marriage registration with homemaker Antoneta Goes (later Antonieta Goes) in Margao. They have four children: three boys – Brandon, an association football player who plays for Mumbai City FC; Beckham (born 2002); and Sydney (born 1984), who is based in the UK – and a daughter, Anisia. Aside from his involvement in tiatrs, Fernandes demonstrated a keen interest in football and actively contributed to the advancement of the sport in Goa.

== Death ==
At 7:30 pm of 10 April, Fernandes, after his participation in a theatrical production called Hem Oxench Choltolem?, returned home around 1:30 am along with his brother and their troupe. An eyewitness from the troupe, Meena, observed that Fernandes appeared to be in good health. Later during the night, Fernandes made a phone call to his son Sydney, who resides in the United Kingdom. In the early hours of 11 April, Fernandes' brother, Roseferns, was informed that Fernandes was having trouble breathing and had a sleepless night. He was immediately taken to South Goa District Hospital in Margao but unfortunately suffered a fatal heart attack on the way and died at around 8:00 am.

Charles D'Souza, a writer for The Goan Everyday, stated that Fernandes was admitted to the hospital for breathing issues, which ultimately resulted in his death. However, Fernandes' death certificate indicates that he died at his residence in Vasvaddo, Benaulim. His funeral took place two days later, on 13 April, at the Holy Trinity Church in Benaulim. The ceremony was attended by a number of individuals, including members of the Konkani tiatr community, politicians, sports personalities, friends, and well-wishers.
