= Vincy Quadros =

Indian writer, editor, author (born 1964)

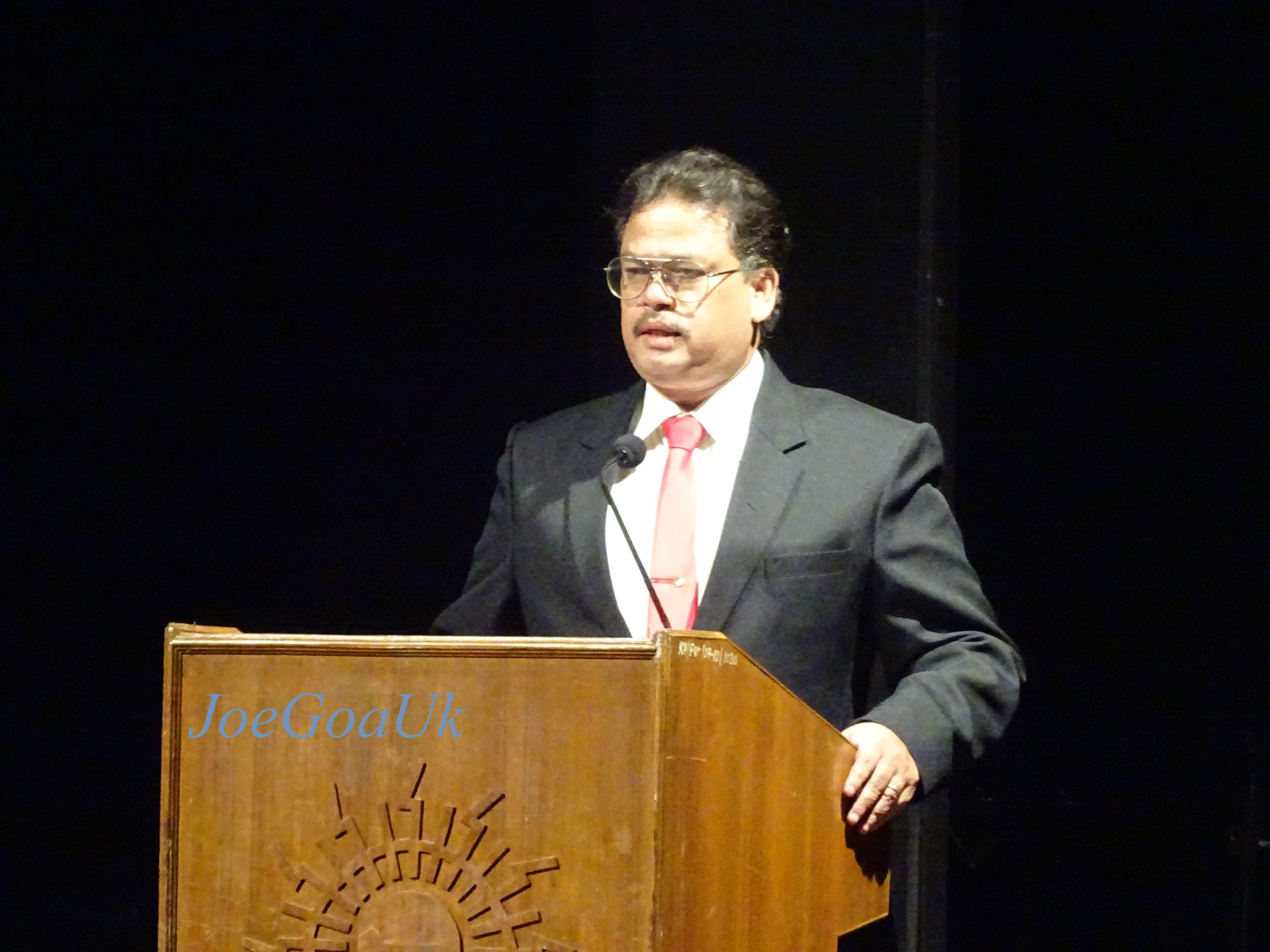
- Born: 1964 (age 61–62)
- Writing career
- Notable work: Jaduchem Pettul
- Notable awards: Bal Sahitya Puraskar in Konkani (2017)

Vincy Quadros (born 1964) is an Indian writer. He was awarded the Bal Sahitya Puraskar in Konkani language in 2017 for his children's novel Jaduchem Pettul.

== Career ==
Vincy Quadros started writing at the age of 12. His first work was a tiatr titled, Chintunk Naslem. He later wrote stories, poems, essays skits and plays for various publications and even All India Radio, all in Konkani.

His first book, Fuldani, was written in Devanagari Konkani in 1989. He has written about 15 tiatr. Besides 6 transliterations, he has also written around 18 books: Fuldani (1990), Kurponno (2007), Sukh ani Dukh (2007), Ghons (2008), Turo (2010), Mollo 2011, Avaz-Dhon (2011), Konnsam (2011), Otmik Vicheardhara (transl. Spiritual Thoughts) (2010), Suryoday (2012), and Romi Lipi Borovpiank ani Vachpiank Sangati (2010), an orthography written in Roman Konkani.

Quadros's work for children includes short stories in PORSUM (2010), the novels Jaduchem Pettul (2011), Jaduchem Pettul (2012), Khell zalo Vell (2014), and short stories Morpakham (2016) and Mannkam Motiam (2016).
