= N. Shivdas =

Indian writer (born 1949)

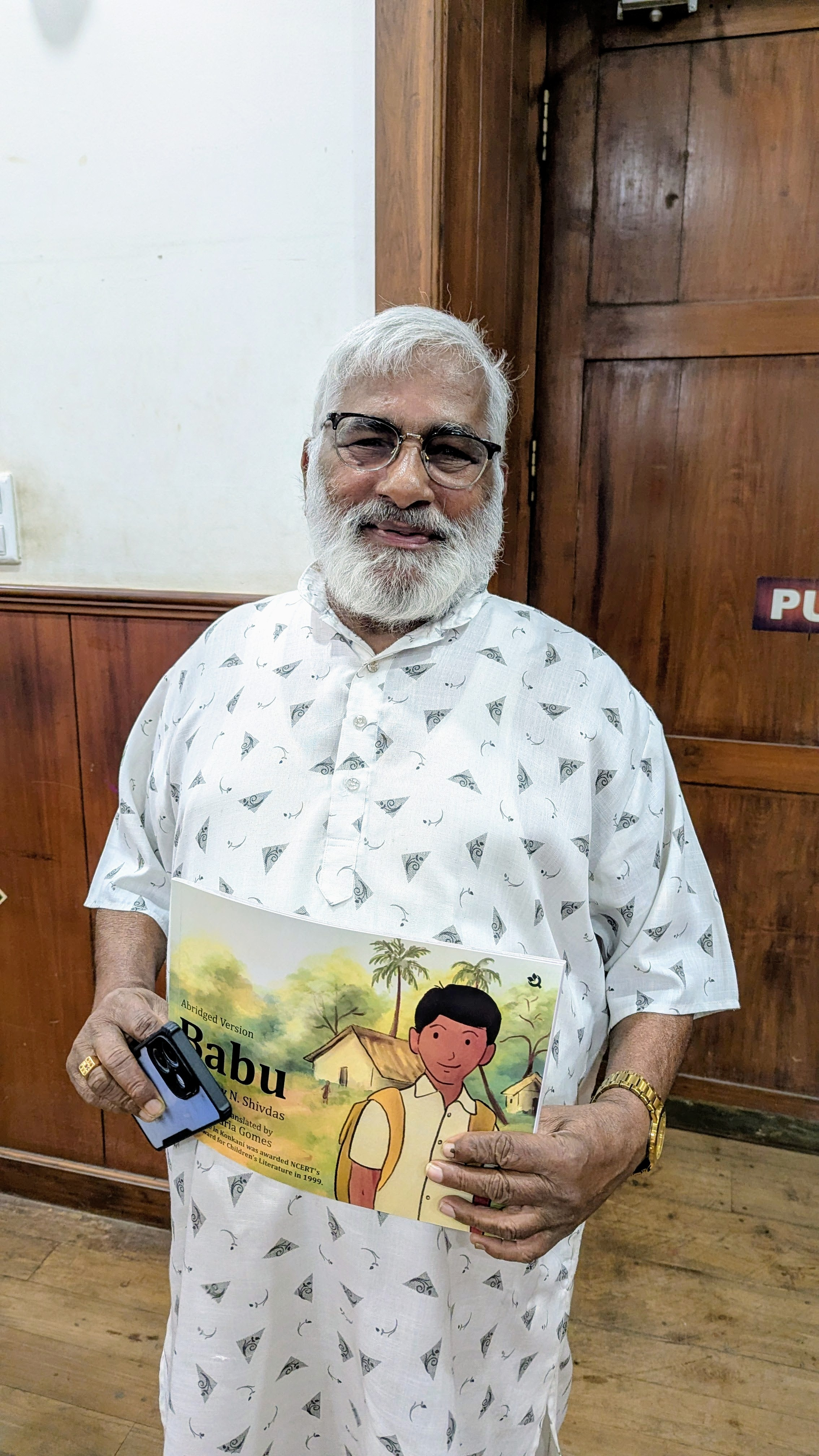
- N. Shivdas with his book, Babu, in 2025
- Born: Shivdas Sonu Naik; 17 March 1949 (age 77); Nageshi Bandoda, Ponda, Goa, India
- Occupations: Writer, social activist, educator
- Spouse: Rajani Salkar (m. 1980)
- Children: 2
- Writing career
- Language: Konkani, Marathi
- Notable work: Bhangarsall; Gallsari; Oh Babush
- Notable awards: Sahitya Akademi Award (2005); Kala Academy Literary Award; NCERT Children's Literature Award (1999)

Shivdas Sonu Naik (born 17 March 1949), known by the pen name N. Shivdas, is an Indian writer and social activist from Goa. He is a prominent figure in Konkani literature, known for his short stories, novels, and plays that often address social inequality and the caste hierarchy. He was awarded the Sahitya Akademi Award in 2005 for his short story collection Bhangarsall.

== Early life and education ==
Shivdas was born in Nageshi Bandoda, Ponda, to Sonu Subha Naik and Shantabai Naik. His father died when he was young, and he was raised by his mother, a farmer. He attended Almeida High School in Ponda, completing his matriculation under the Pune Board in 1970. Due to financial constraints, he began working as a government primary teacher in 1971 while pursuing higher education. He eventually graduated in English Literature from Bombay University.

== Literary career ==
Shivdas began writing as a schoolboy, initially in Marathi and Portuguese before finding his primary creative voice in his mother tongue, Konkani. His first short story was published in the Pormol Diwali issue, followed by "Ant Eke Zinnecho" in Novem Goyem. He gained further recognition through story writing competitions held by the daily Rashtramat.

His literary work is noted for its "fresh narrative techniques" and use of local idioms. His short story collections Gallsari (1983) and Maharukh (1999) won several regional awards. In 2005, his third collection, Bhangarsall, received the national Sahitya Akademi Award.

Shivdas also wrote for children; his novelette Babu was selected as the best Konkani book for children by NCERT in 1999. His novels include Oh Babush (2014), which deals with environmental destruction and local power politics, and Mhazan (2015), which explores themes of legitimacy and temple traditions during the Portuguese era.

== Activism ==
In addition to his writing, Shivdas is a dedicated social activist. During the Goa Opinion Poll of 1967, he actively campaigned against the merger of Goa into Maharashtra. He was a member of the cultural troupe Jai Gomantak Kalapathak and later joined the Konkani Porjecho Avaz (KPA) to advocate for Konkani's status as Goa's official language.

He pioneered the Devlle Khuil Kara movement, which sought to open Goan Hindu temples to all caste groups, challenging the bans imposed by certain temple managements on non-Brahmin Hindus. He also led a movement of farmers against the government and another of bus commuters.

== Political career ==
As of 2012, as a member of the Indian National Congress, he was the Vice-President of Goa Pradesh Congress Committee (GPCC).

== Positions and honours ==
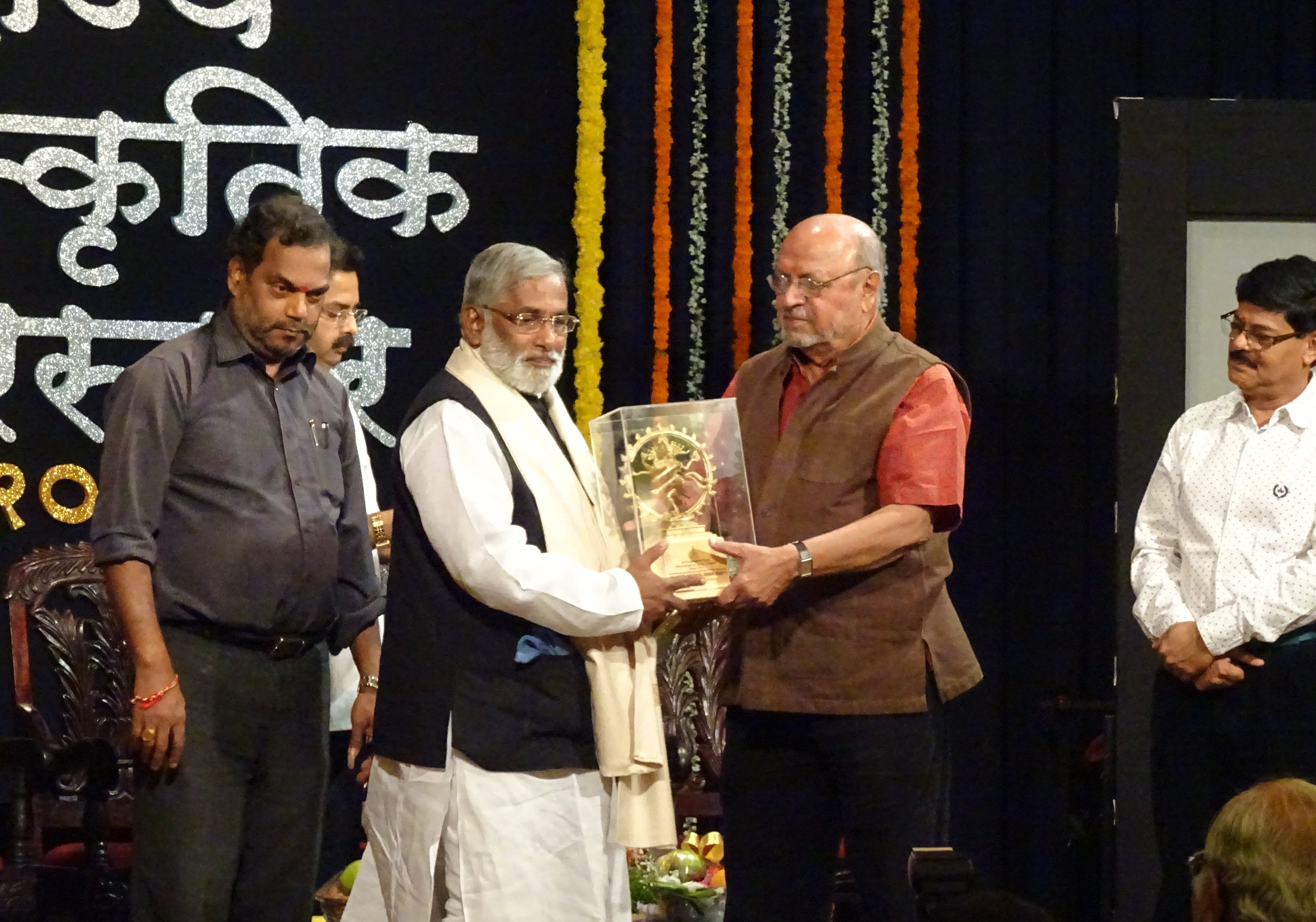
N. Shivdas receiving the Goa State Cultural Award from Shyam Benegal

Shivdas has held several leadership roles in literary organizations:

- President of the Goa Konkani Akademi (appointed by the Goa Government).
- Founder President of the Konkani Lekhak Sangh (re-elected for a third term in 2015).
- President of the 23rd session of the All India Konkani Sahitya Sammelan held in New Delhi (2017).
- Member of the Sahitya Akademi's Konkani Advisory Board (2003).
- Vice-President of Goa Pradesh Congress Committee (GPCC)

== Reception ==
In 2012, a poem of his written in c. 1987 titled Chedi (transl. Prostitute) was criticised by women's rights organisations in Goa. The poem compared life with a commercial sex worker.

== Selected bibliography ==
=== Short story collections ===
- Gallsari (1981)
- Naklami (1995)
- Maharukh (1999)
- Bhangarsall (2003)
- Shivkatha (2015)

=== Novels ===
- Oh Babush (2014)
- Mhazan (2015)
- Hindu...? Mahajan (Konkani and Marathi)

=== Plays ===
- Pissatt (1979)
- Foreign Zavoi (1983)
- Bundd (1985)

=== Children's literature ===
- Babu (1983)
- Zhoro Zalo Mahasagar (1995)
- Hanv Panchavi Pass (2007)

=== Translations ===
- Bhavyatra (2017) – Konkani translation of Gujarati poems by Narendra Modi.
- Mantra aani Her Katha (2014) – Konkani translation of short stories by Premchand.
