= João Afonso =

João Afonso may refer to

- João Afonso (singer) (born 1965, pt:João Afonso), Mozambican-born Portuguese singer
- João Afonso (footballer, born 1982), Portuguese footballer for Belenenses
- João Afonso (footballer, born 1990), Portuguese footballer for Córdoba CF
- João Afonso (footballer, born 1995), Brazilian footballer for Gil Vicente
- João Afonso (footballer, born 2007), Portuguese goalkeeper for FC Porto
