= Dalgado Konknni Akademi =

Organization based in Goa, India

- Logo of the Dalgado Konknni Akademi
- Formation: 1988; 38 years ago
- President: Celso Fernandes
- Secretary: Myron Jeson Barreto
- Key people: Freddy J da Costa, Tomazinho Cardozo, Prabhakar Tendulkar, Premanand Lotlikar, Vincy Quadros
- Website: dalgadoacademy.com

The Dalgado Konknni Akademi (DKA) is an organisation located in Panjim, Goa that works for the development and promotion of Konkani in the Roman script.

== History ==
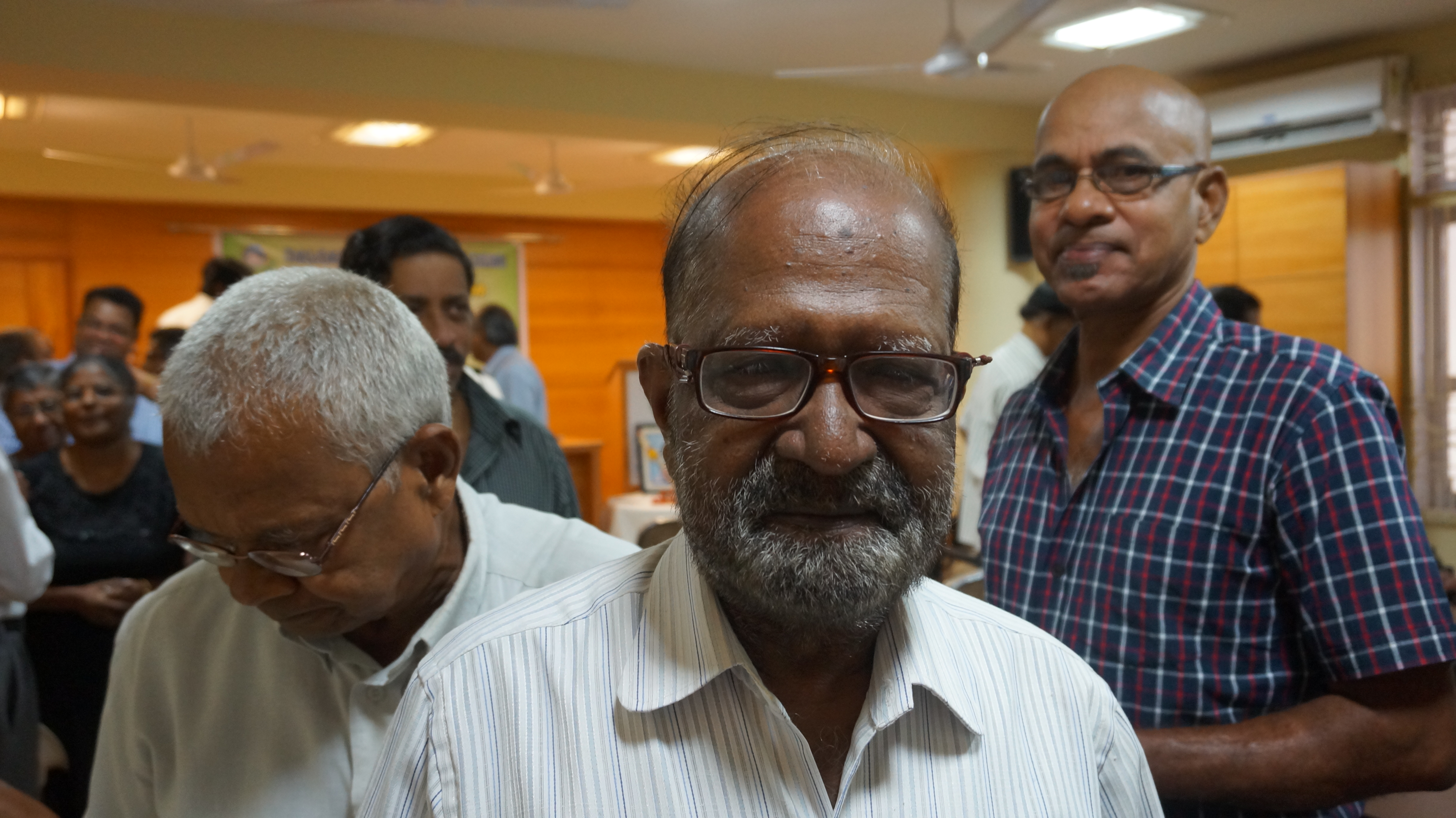
Bonaventura d'Pietro, a prominent Konkani writer, in 2015. An award has been instituted in his name after his death.

The academy was established in 1988 and named after Goan Catholic priest Sebastião Rodolfo Dalgado. During the period 1988-1992, the DKA was very active. Fr. Freddy J. da Costa was the president, playwright Tomazinho Cardozo was the secretary and Prabhakar Tendulkar the treasurer. During this period, DKA published Konkani Orthography in Roman Script, a publication intended for writers to understand the principles and rules of writing Konkani in Roman script.

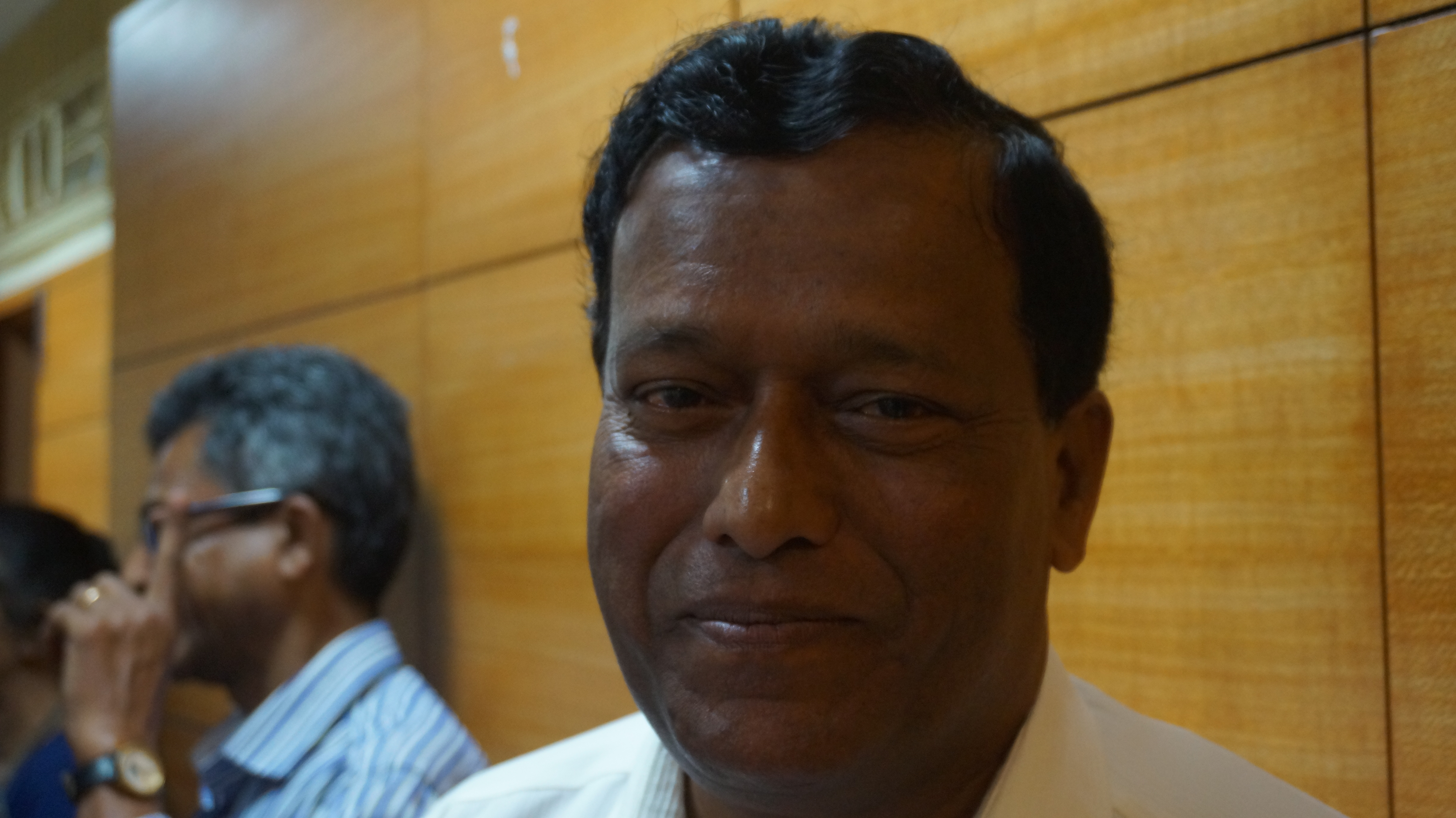
Premanand Lotlikar in September 2015

Cardozo was the second president and Jose Salvador Fernandes and Prabhakar Tendulkar were the secretary and treasurer respectively. Konkani actor Premanand Lotlikar was the president of for three consecutive terms of 3 years each (2008 to 2017) while Vincy Quadros has been the secretary from the year 2014. There have been calls for the Government of Goa to stop discriminating against Romi Konkani and officially recognise the DKA.

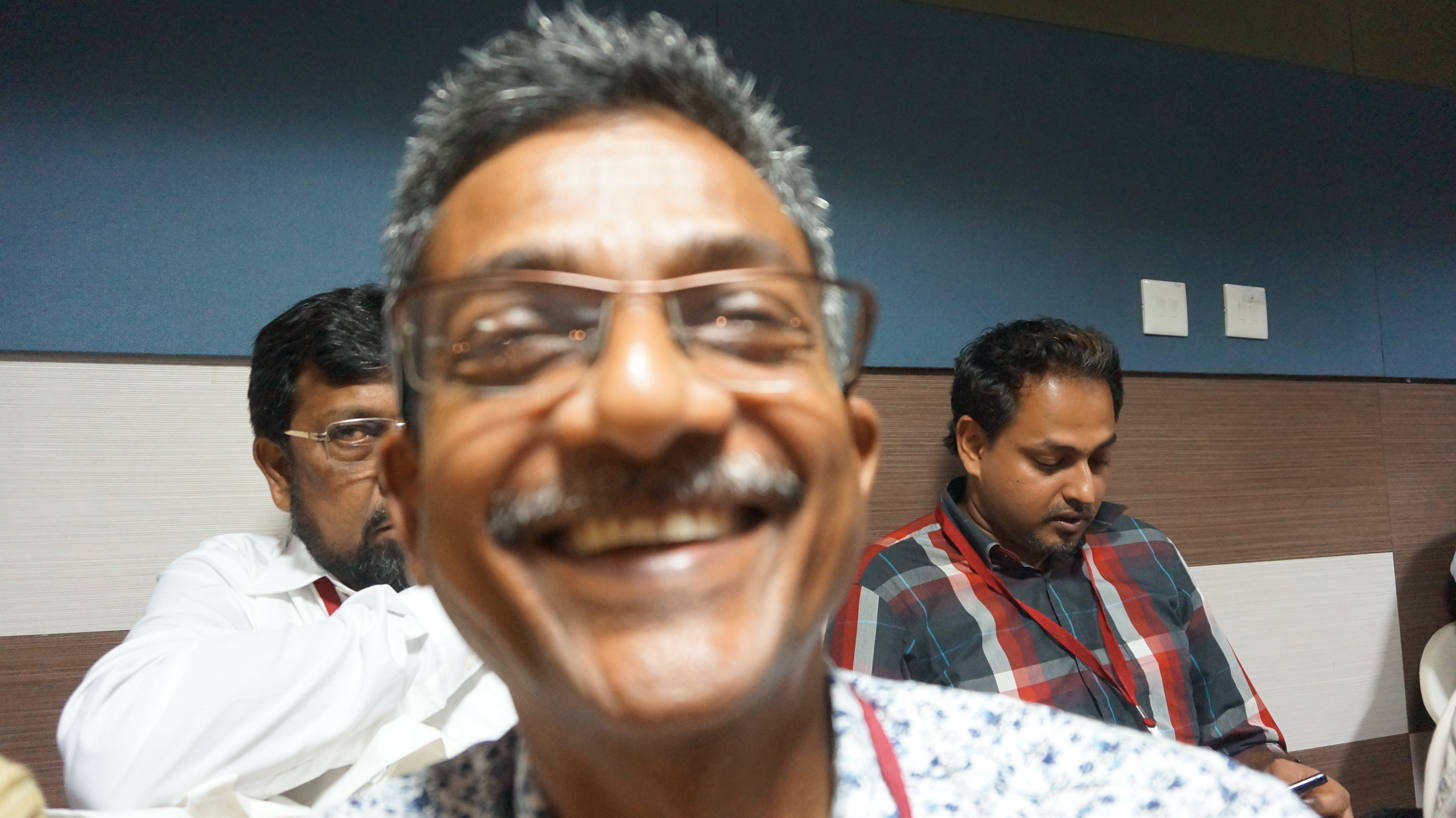
Walter Menezes, Konkani and English writer

The organisation aims to promote the study and development of the Konkani language in Roman script; recognize schools that promote the Konkani language; and hold cultural activities for the Konkani language, its literature, and the culture of its writers and speakers.

== Activities ==
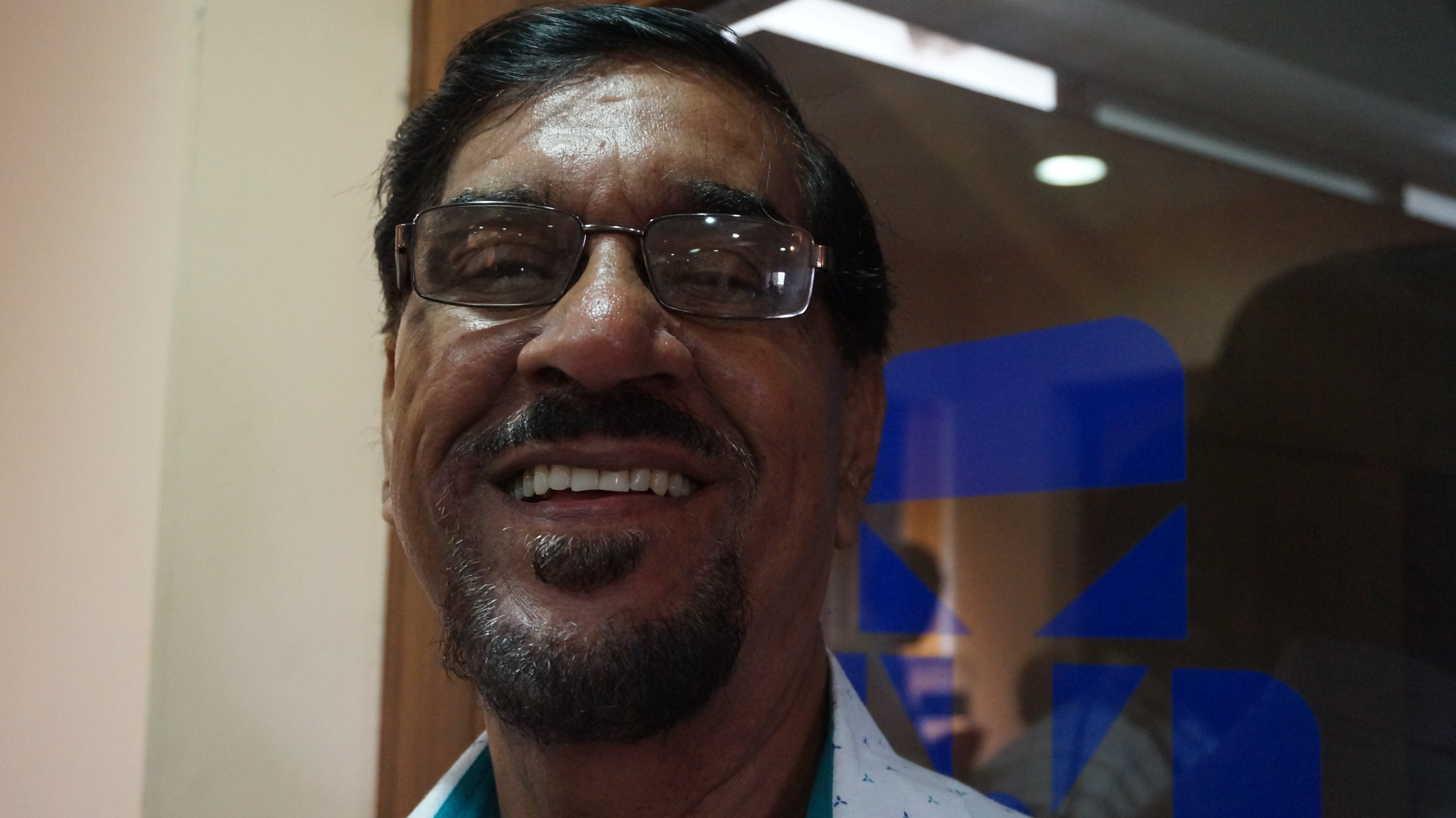
Wilson Mazarello, also known as WilMix, Konkani tiatrist

The main events organised by the Dalgado Konknni Akademi are:

Celebration of the following days:

- Opinion Poll Day - Jan. 16;
- Konkani Journalism Day- Feb 02;
- Konkani Cinema Day - Apr. 24;
- Dalgado Memorial Day - May 8;
- Prabhakar Tendulkar Memorial Day - June 4;
- Reginald Fernandes Memorial Day - June 14;
- Fr. Freddy J. Da Costa Memorial Day July 20;
- DKA Foundation Day Aug. 28.

Annual Awards:

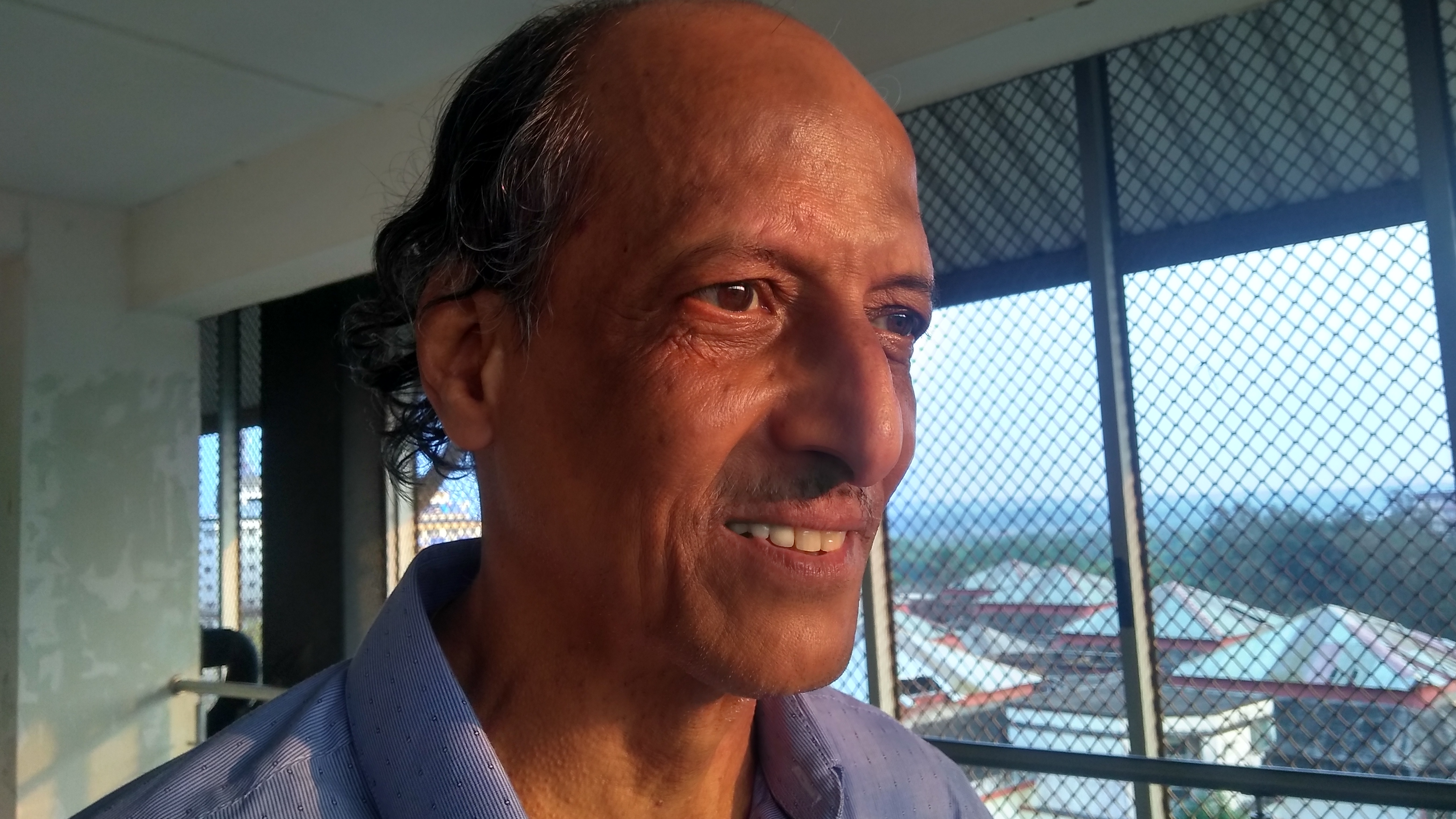
Isidore Dantas, Konkani writer, translator, lexicographer, one of the writers honoured by the DKA.

- Dalgado Sahityik Puraskar (Dalgado Literature Award);
- Dalado Sonskrutik Puraskar (Dalgado Cultural Award);
- Dalgado Romi Konknni Seva Puraskar (Dalgado Roman Konkani Service Award);
- Fr. Freddy J. Da Costa Potrkarita Puraskar (Fr Freddy J Da Costa Journalism Award);
- Prabhakar Tendulkar Romi Konknni Sonstha Puraskar (Prabhakar Tendulkar Roman Konkani Association Award);
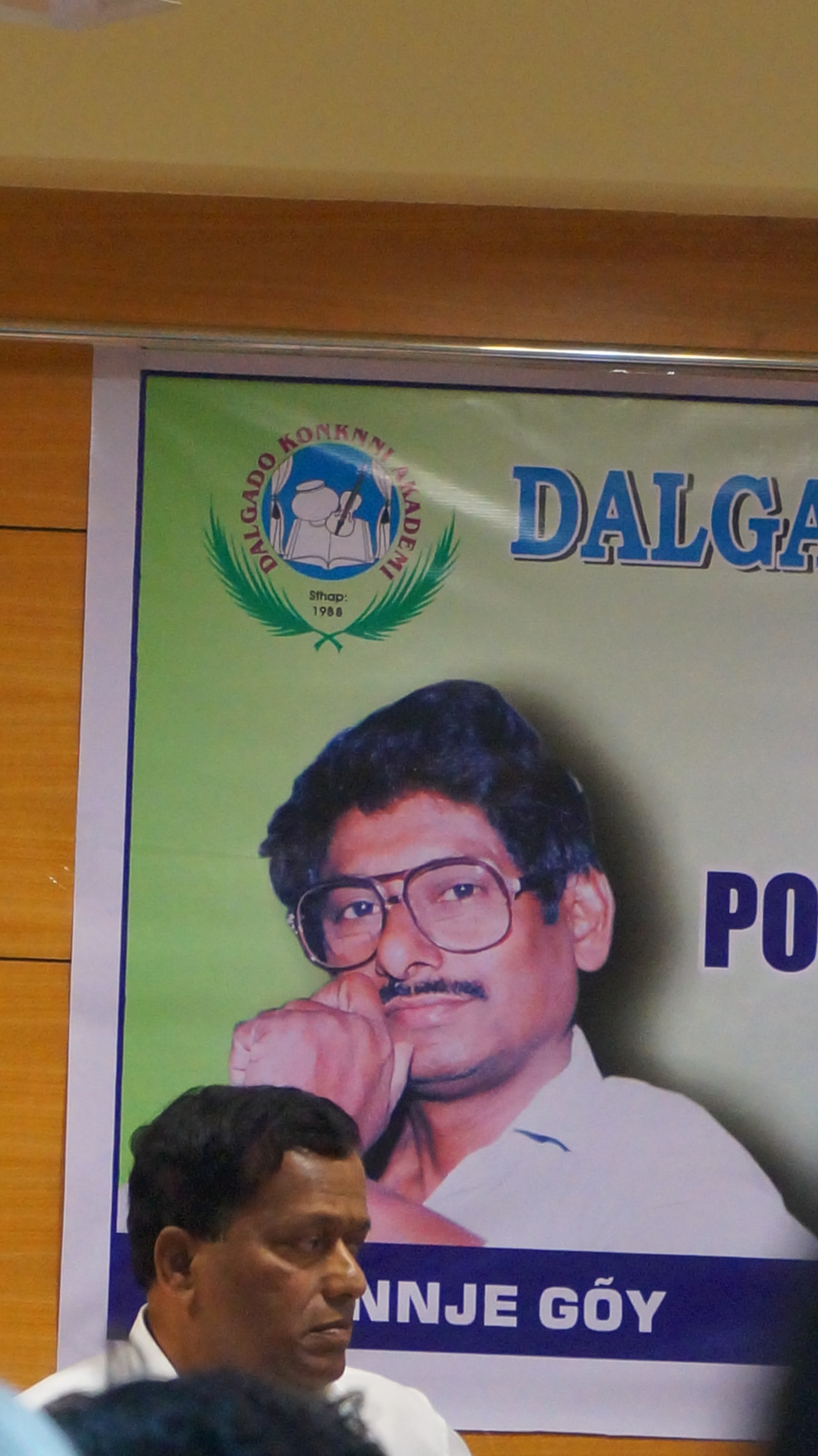
- An award has been instituted as a tribute to the late journalist Joel D'Souza, represented in the background; in foreground, Premanand Lotlikar
  Joel D'Souza Daiz Puraskar (Joel D'Souza Heritage Award);
- Dalgado Tornatto Puraskar (Dalgado Youth Award);
- Berta Menezes Ostori Puraskar (Bertha Menezes Women's Award);
- Bonaventure D'Pietro Vorsachem Pustok Puroskar (Bonaventure D'Pietro Year of the Book Award);

These awards are instituted to give recognition for the work done by the writers and others in the field of Romi Konkani literature, cultural activists, heritage activist, young talent, best Romi Konkani institution and journalism.

The Akademi has also initiated the Konknni (Romi Lipi) Sahitya ani Sonvskrutik Sammelan (Konkani Literary and Cultural Conference) which has been held since the year 2008. Vincy Quadros was the President of First Sommelan. Akademi also organises Writers Conference every year for the benefit of Romi Konkani Writers.

Apart from this, the academy holds literary competitions on short story, poetry, essays, once act plays and novels. and organises poets' meets. The DKA also publishes a large number of Konkani books. The academy also organises contests such as novel writing and story reading in order to increase the readership and simultaneously to inculcate the habit of reading Konknni in Roman Script. The year 2015 made a way for State level Konkani Reading Competition. Those secured first three places are selected for Final Round at Akademi's Panjim office. Cash prizes and certificates are awarded at all levels. The DKA has ties with the Thomas Stephens Konknni Kendr and coordinates several activities with it.

== Location ==
The Akademi is located in the old Education Department Building's second floor, near the Goa Pharmacy College on the second floor of the building based in the Goa state capital of Panjim or Panaji.
