= Nelson Afonso =

Indian singer and composer (1934–1982)

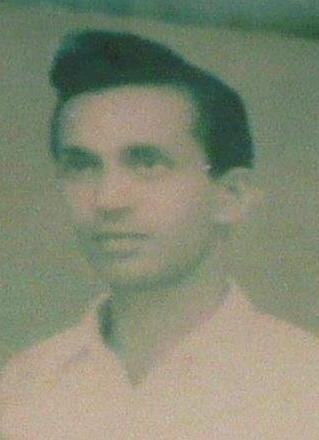
- Afonso during his youth
- Born: Nelson João Sulpicio Afonso; 20 April 1934; Vasco da Gama, Goa, Portuguese India
- Died: 18 June 1982 (aged 48); Vasco da Gama, Goa, India
- Occupations: Singer; composer; playwright; director
- Years active: c. 1951–1982
- Spouse: Maria Dias (m. 1958)
- Children: Jr. Nelson (son)

Nelson João Sulpicio Afonso (20 April 1934 – 18 June 1982) was an Indian singer, composer, playwright, and theatre director who worked on the Konkani stage.

== Early life ==
Nelson João Sulpicio Afonso was born on 20 April 1934, in Vasco da Gama, Goa, which was a part of Portuguese India. He was born into a Goan Catholic family, with his father, Manoel Adolfo Alfonso, originating from Aldona, and his mother, Evelina Idinha Cardoso e Afonso, being a homemaker. Afonso's mother possessed vocal abilities, which he inherited, and it became evident at a young age that he had a natural talent for singing. Encouraged by his neighbors, Afonso began showcasing his vocal prowess in village concerts and tiatrs, a popular form of Konkani musical theater. One of his neighbors, Baptista Lobo, provided him with the opportunity to perform in these events. Although originally from Aldona, Goa, Afonso eventually settled in Vasco da Gama, Goa.

== Career ==
Afonso embarked on his professional journey in the Konkani theater at the age of 17, marking his debut on the stage. Known for his vocal prowess, he swiftly gained popularity within local villages. It was during this time that A. S. Conception, a tiatrist residing in Afonso's neighborhood, discerned his abilities while witnessing one of his performances in a village drama. Recognizing Afonso's potential, Conception took it upon himself to introduce the budding talent to the established tiatrists of that era. Conception's efforts culminated in Afonso securing a breakthrough opportunity on the commercial tiatr stage, which facilitated his acceptance and artistic growth. Conception also took a personal interest in nurturing Afonso's development. Afonso's talents soon captured the attention of senior tiatrists, who promptly cast him in their productions. Initially, he primarily portrayed female characters, exhibiting an ability to convincingly embody their essence through his attire, actions, and comedic timing. Gradually, Afonso's passion for music composition began to emerge, leading him to create a repertoire of songs. His multifaceted abilities as an actor and singer left a mark on the tiatr stage. As his career blossomed, Afonso ventured into the realm of playwriting. Crafting his own tiatrs, he showcased proficiency in constructing compelling narratives. Afonso's scripts were appreciated for their thematic depth and meaningful messages.

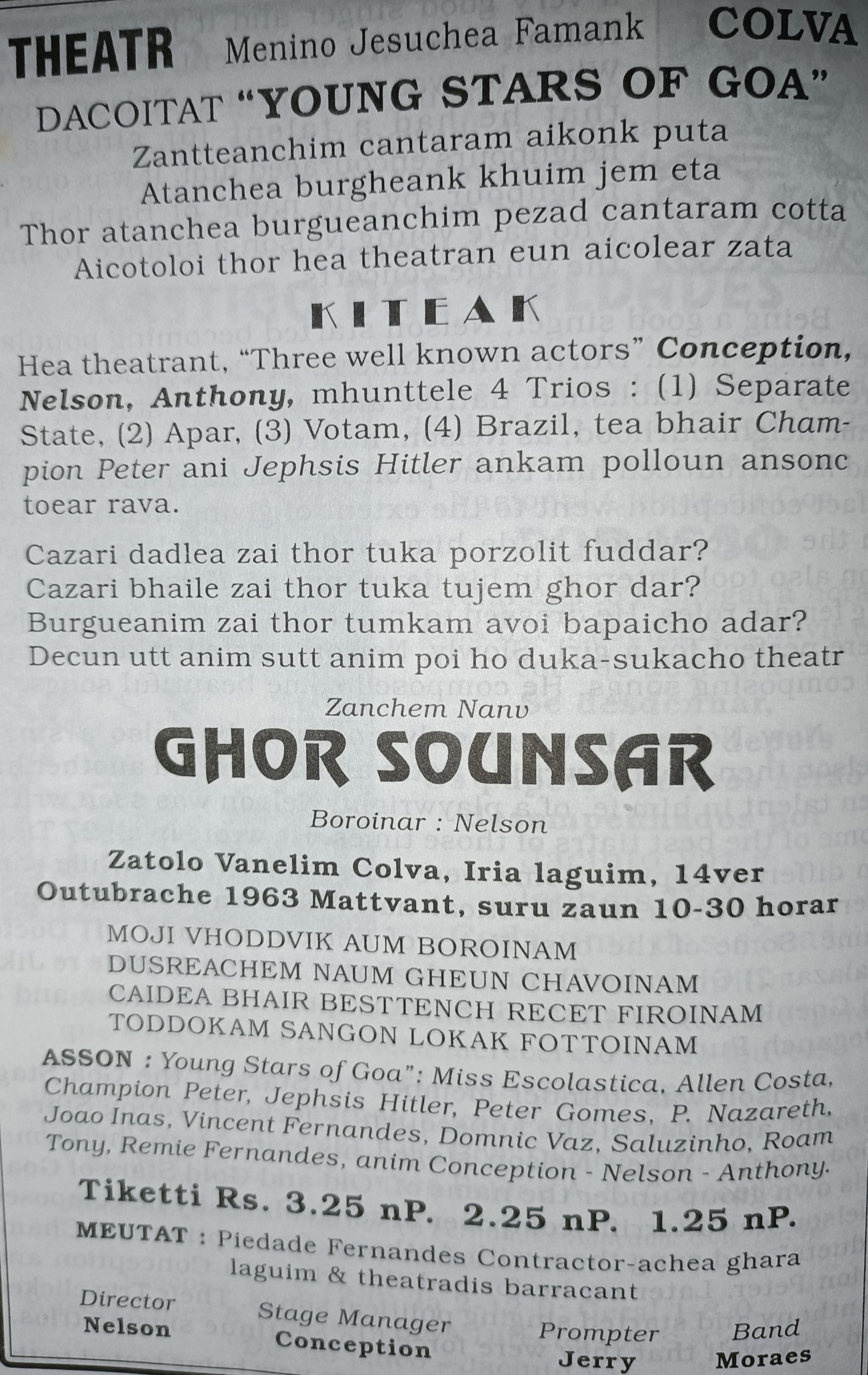
Handbill of the tiatr Ghor Sounsar by Afonso in the Konkani language, 1963

Afonso emerged as a known figure in the world of tiatrs, crafting a collection of theatrical works during his era. With a total of 27 tiatrs under his belt, Afonso covered a wide range of topics, including social issues and politics. His political tiatr titled Nationalist propelled him to fame and resonated with the Goan audience. Among Afonso's popular tiatrs are Doctor Salazar, Ghorabo (Family), Almas do Outro Mundo (Souls from the Other World), Jikle re Jikle (We won, We won), Goenkar Te Goenkar (Goans are Goans), Suttka Uprant (Post Freedom), Dolorosa, and Doganch Puro (Two is enough). Afonso's contributions extended beyond writing, as he played a pivotal role in shaping the tiatr landscape. Afonso established the troupe Stars of the Goa Stage, consisting primarily of young and aspiring tiatrists. The troupe's name was eventually changed to Young Stars of Goa. Furthermore, during the staging of his tiatr Asro, Afonso formed his own group, known as the Old and Gold Stars of Goa. This group comprised both seasoned and emerging tiatrists. Afonso had a particular focus on composing songs. Initially, he composed duets and performed alongside artists such as Anthony, Conception, and Champion Peter. Subsequently, Afonso formed a trio with Conception and Anthony, specializing in politically charged songs. These compositions gained popularity for their outspoken commentary on issues like corruption. While the songs exhibited a satirical and critical tone, they maintained a respectful approach, avoiding any defamatory content.

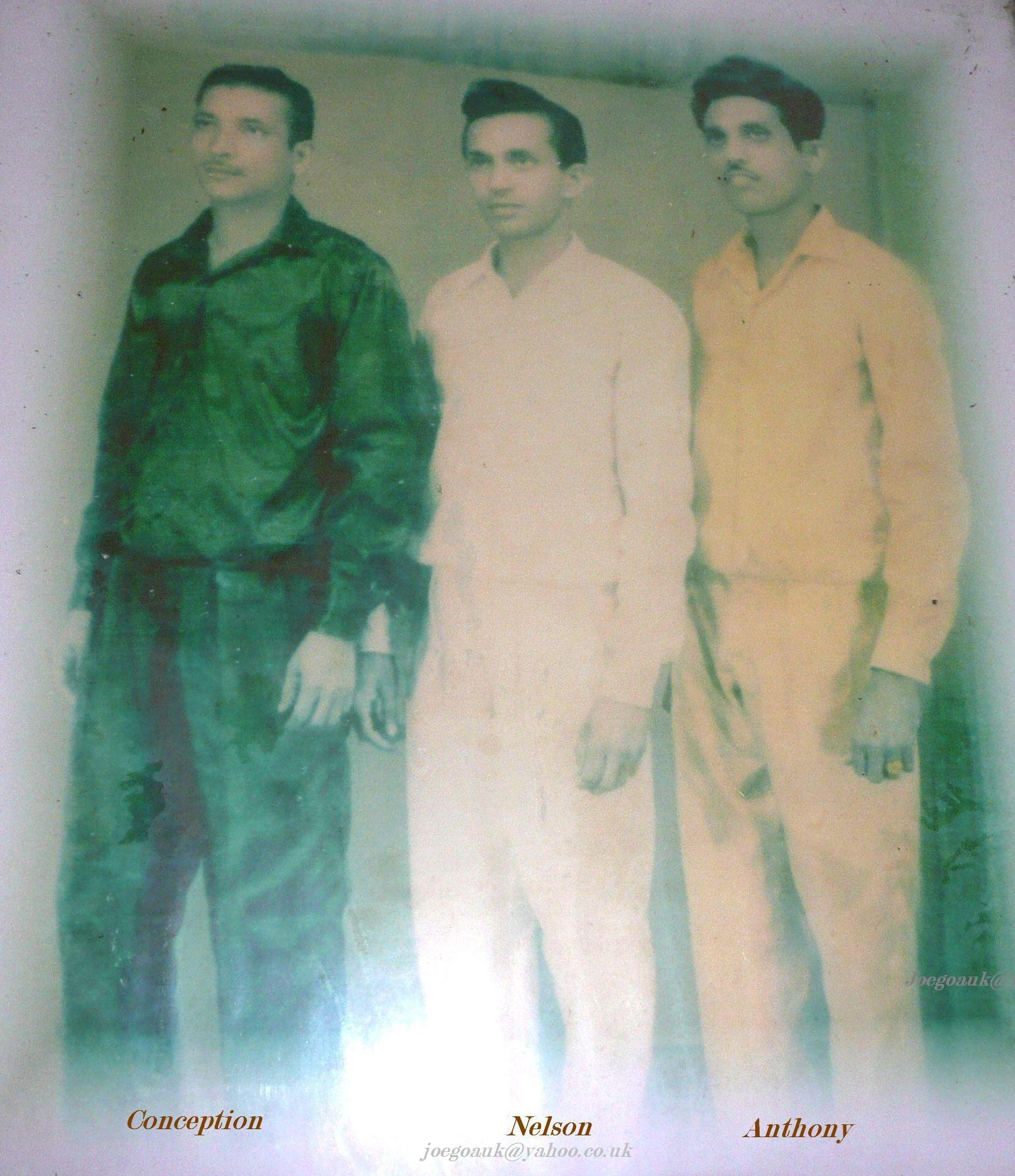
The Conception-Nelson-Anthony trio

The trio's success propelled them to continue performing together, placing Afonso in the forefront as the primary composer. As the demand for government criticism grew, Afonso's songwriting abilities were put to the test, as he met the audience's expectations by delivering thought-provoking compositions. Afonso's creative innovation extended to the realm of stage design. In 1968, he made history by introducing the first single revolving stage in Konkani tiatr with his popular production, Dolorosa. This stage design, named the "ring and roll", featured a kitchen hall on one side and a road scene on the other. The stage's unique fabrication by Afonso allowed for seamless transitions between sets, eliminating the need for frequent set changes. By situating the two sets opposite each other, Afonso enabled a swift rotation of the stage, presenting the second set to the audience after the completion of the first. Over the course of his career, Afonso composed and performed over 100 songs. Songs like "Nak Chepta," "Knockout," and "Gaddo" gained popularity. Additionally, he participated in more than 500 tiatr performances, spanning across his own productions and collaborative endeavors. Afonso's talent led him to tour various regions, including Bombay, Goa, and East Africa.

== Personal life ==
On 24 May 1958, Afonso married the homemaker Maria do Rosario Dias (later known as Maria Rosada Dias) at Mormugão Church. Their son, Tomas "Tommy" Afonso, known professionally as Jr. Nelson, is a singer on the Konkani stage. On 18 June 1982, Afonso died at MPT Hospital in Vasco da Gama, Goa, at the age of 48.

== Selected stage works ==
Year	Title	Role	Notes	Ref
c. 1951	Untitled tiatr		Professional debut	
1960s	Nationalist	Writer/director		
1960s	Doctor Salazar	Writer director		
1960s	Almas do Outro Mundo	Writer/director		
1963	Ghor Sounsar	Writer/director	Also singer	
1968	Dolorosa	Writer/director		
1969	Ghorabo	Writer/director		
	Jikle re Jikle	Writer/director		
	Goenkar Te Goenkar	Writer/director		
	Suttka Uprant	Writer/director		
1977	Doganch Puro	Writer/director		

== Select discography ==
- Nak Chepta
- Knockout
- Gaddo

=== Trios (with Conception & Anthony) ===
- Separate State
- Apar
- Votam
- Brazil
