= Roseferns =

Indian playwright and director (born 1954)

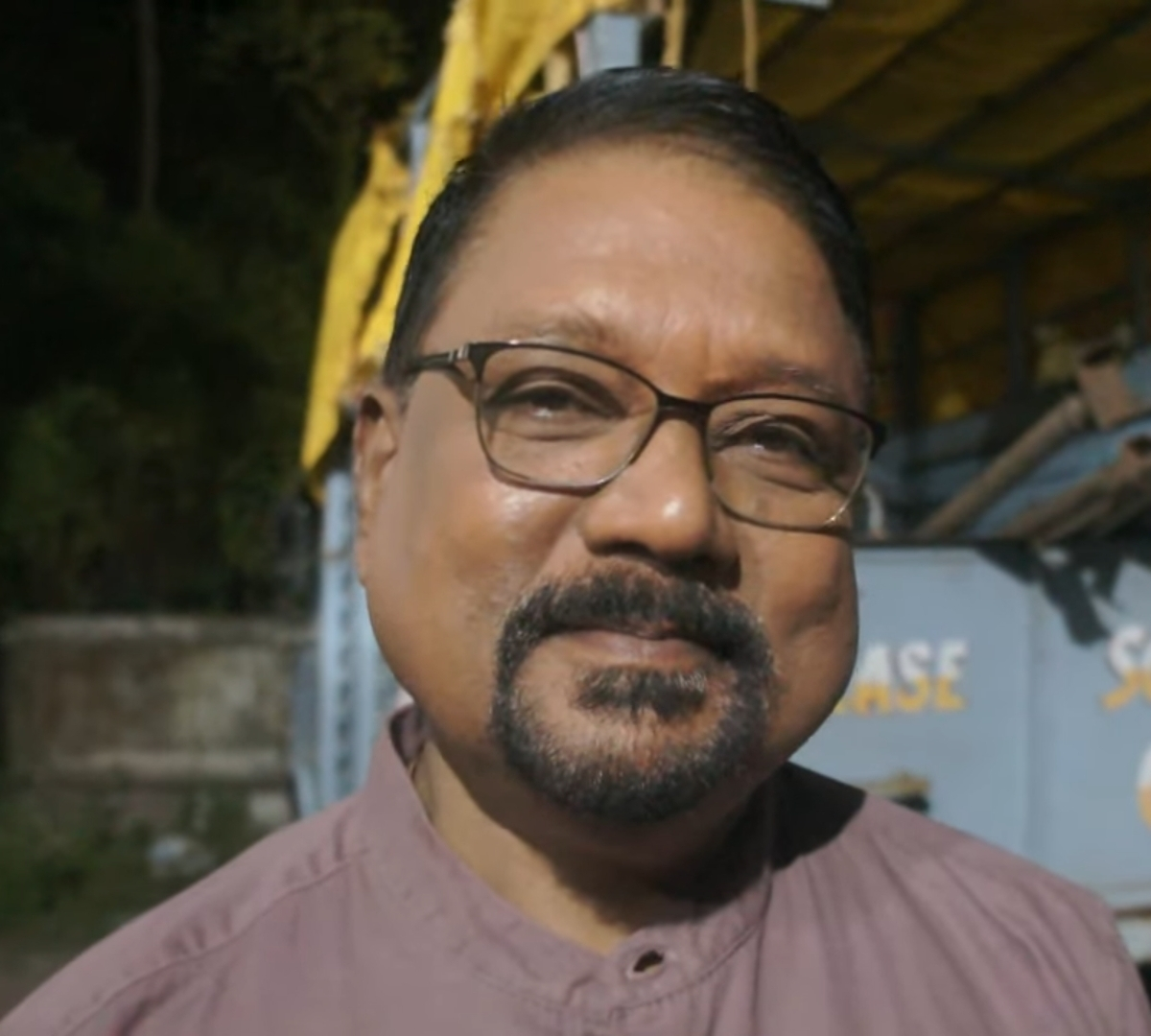
- Fernandes in 2023
- Born: Antonio Rosario Fernandes; 21 September 1954 (age 71); Benaulim, Goa, Portuguese India
- Occupations: Playwright; theatre director; actor
- Years active: 1972–present
- Notable work: Padri (2005)
- Spouse: Socorrina Fernandes
- Relatives: Jaju Fernandes (brother); Brandon Fernandes (nephew)

1st Vice President of Tiatr Academy of Goa
- In office 21 January 2009 – 15 March 2012
- Preceded by: Office established
- Succeeded by: Joe Rose
- Website: roseferns.com Archived 2014-01-06 at the Wayback Machine

Antonio Rosario Fernandes (born 21 September 1954), known professionally as Roseferns, is an Indian playwright, theatre director, and actor known for his work in Konkani films and tiatr productions. He popularly goes under the sobriquet "King of centuries". Fernandes wrote his first tiatr Bolidan (Sacrifice) in 1972, while still a student for a school function. As of April 2013, Fernandes' tiatr Thapott (Slap) is his best production with 230 shows.
