= Prince Jacob =

Indian actor and singer (born 1960)

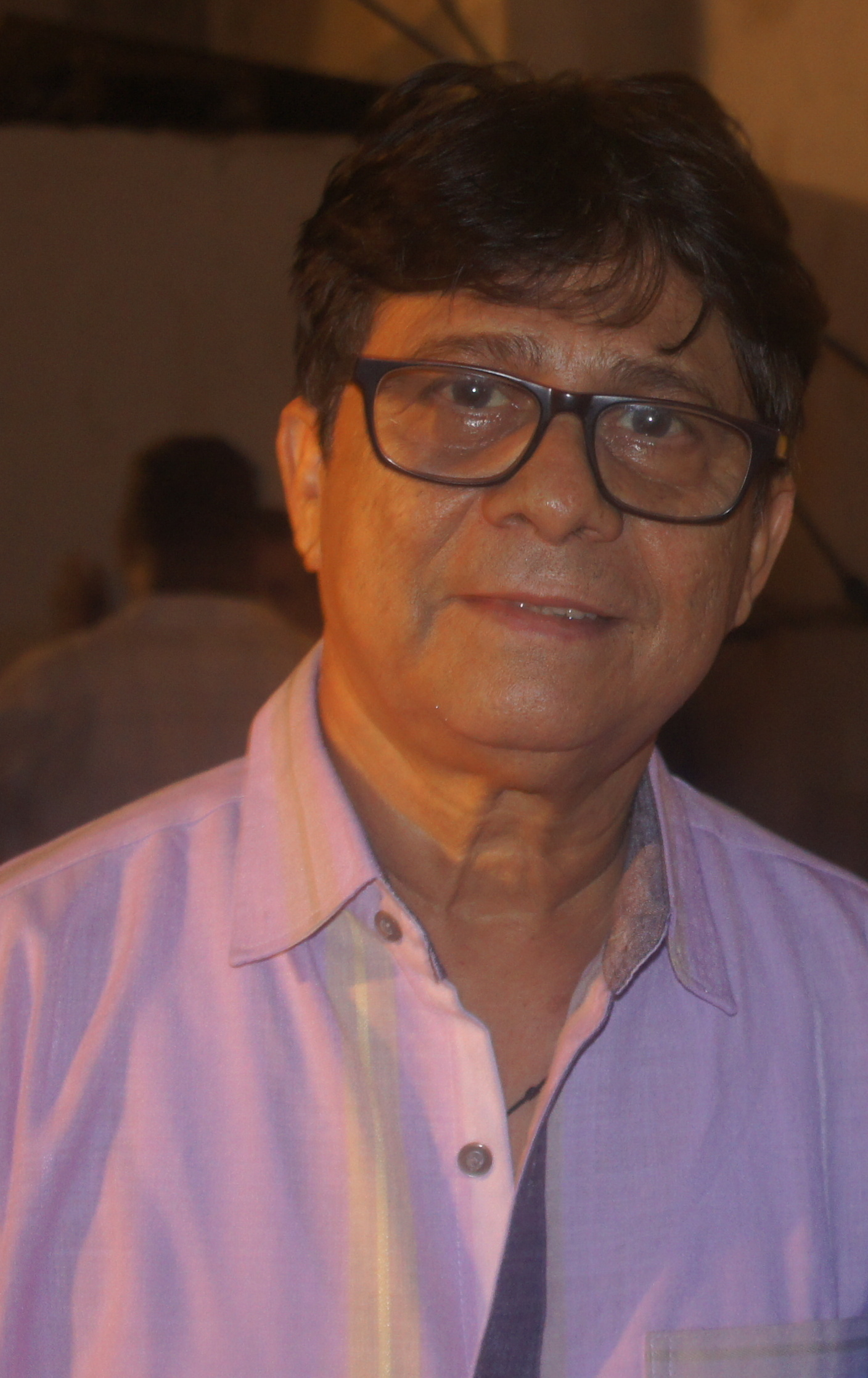
- Fernandes at Dis Ani Rat titar in Mapusa, 2023
- Born: Miguel Jacob Carmo Luis Fernandes; 16 July 1960 (age 65); Fatorda, Goa, Portuguese India
- Occupations: Actor; singer; comedian; playwright; director; producer; radio jockey
- Years active: 1973–present
- Spouse: Cynthia Fernandes
- Children: 3

2nd President of Tiatr Academy of Goa
- In office 30 July 2012 – 3 September 2015
- Preceded by: Tomazinho Cardozo
- Succeeded by: Comedian Agostinho

Miguel Jacob Carmo Luis Fernandes (born 16 July 1960), known professionally as Prince Jacob, is an Indian actor, singer, comedian, playwright, director, producer, and radio personality known for his work in Marathi, Konkani films, and tiatr productions. He is a former president of Tiatr Academy of Goa.
