= Xempea Minguel =

Indian stage actor and comedian (1922–1990)

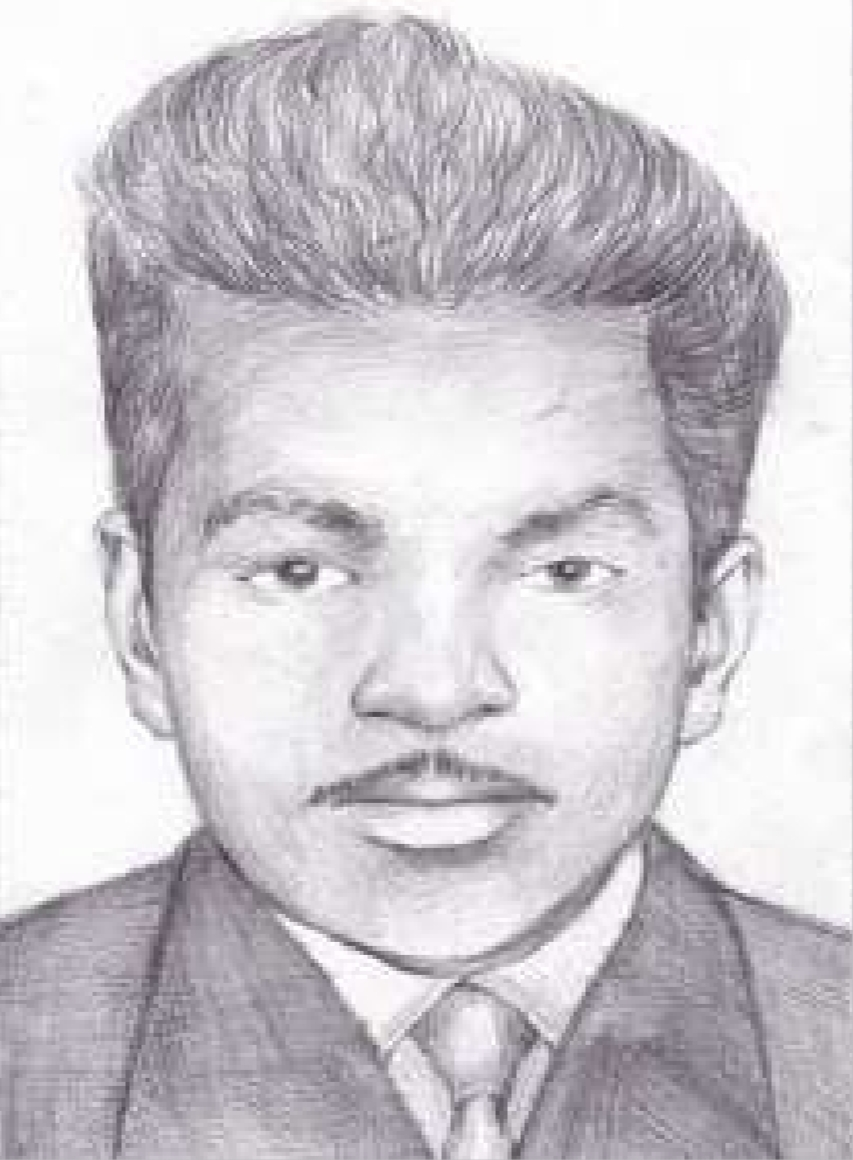
- Portrait of Morais during his youth
- Born: Miguel Morais; 7 February 1922; Assolda, Goa, Portuguese India
- Died: 24 March 1990 (aged 68); Benaulim, Goa, India
- Occupations: Actor; comedian; director; teacher
- Years active: ~1960s
- Spouse: Lourdes Pereira
- Children: 3
- Relatives: Antonio Moraes (brother)

Miguel Morais (7 February 1922 – 24 March 1990), known professionally as Xempea Minguel, (Note: literally meaning "Minguel with a tail".) was an early 20th-century Indian stage actor, comedian, director, and drama teacher known for his work in fells or khells (traditional Goan street plays).

== Early life ==
Miguel Morais was born on 7 February 1922 in the village of Assolda, which was located in the region of Goa during the period of Portuguese colonial rule. At the time, Goa was part of the Portuguese Empire, though it is now situated within the modern nation of India. Morais was born into a Goan Catholic family, the third of four sons: Tiburcio (born 1918), Zpeferino (born 1916), and Antonio (born 1924). They were born to day laborers Paulo Morais and Conceiçaō Maria Fernandes, who hailed from Xeldem, Goa.

As Morais matured, his family made the decision to move to the village of Benaulim around the year 1934. When Morais' younger brother Antonio was still a child, their father Paulo died. During their childhood, as all four brothers were still young, their mother Conceição found it challenging to support the family alone. Consequently, as Morais and his siblings grew older, their mother arranged for them to work in other households to contribute to the family's income.

== Career ==
Biographical details about the Goan theater performer Morais are scarce. There is limited publicly available information regarding his career, with most known facts coming from published literary sources. According to the 2019 book Tiatr 125th Commemorative Volume, Fausto V. Da Costa, a fellow writer states that, Morais was known as a popular khellgoddo - a term used to describe a stage actor in traditional Goan street theater productions. The text indicates that Morais exclusively performed in fells - a type of 19th century Goan street play - that were staged by his younger sibling, Antonio Moraes, who was considered a pioneering figure in the development of the modernized Goan theatrical form known as khell tiatr. While Antonio was regarded as the mestri (teacher) of these khells (an alternate name for fells, a term known in the Salcete region), the specific dramatic works in which Morais appeared were referred to as "Xempea Minglilo Fell". Beyond these limited biographical details documented in the commemorative volume, little additional information about Morais's theatrical career and wider contributions can be conclusively stated based on available sources.

In the Konkani theater sphere, Morais was a known figure among a group of popular performers referred to as khellam mistri or mestri, who were recognized for their involvement in instructing and showcasing a traditional performance style known as zomnivhele khell, as documented by journalists Gary Azavedo and Pio Esteves in The Times of India. Other popular artists in this group included Khadda Minguel, Anton Marie, Santiago Pereira, Shalibai, Don Toclo, Piedade Fernandes, and Rosario Rodrigues. As per the accounts of Bombay-based archivist Edward "Eddie" Verdes, it is stated that, Morais and his contemporary khell artist Buk Buko, originating from the town of Chinchinim, were celebrated for their humorous acting performances that brought joy and laughter to audiences. Morais primarily appeared in khell productions that were staged around his home village of Benaulim. Konkani singer Osvi Viegas, a figure within the Konkani theater community, has provided additional insights about Morais and his contemporaries. In writings published in the Gulab magazine, Viegas identified Morais as one of the prominent khell artists of the 1960s, alongside figures like Anton Marie, Santiago Pereira, Menino Afonso, Marian Silva, Diniz Sequeira, A. Moraes, Patrick Dourado, Khell Jose, Buk Buko, Don Toclo, Shalibai, Khadda Minguel, Socorro Piedade Fernandes, and Magnier Rod. Viegas observed that the theatrical productions created by this ensemble of performers were popular for their enlightening content, especially receiving acclaim for the engaging and quality of their opening and featured songs.

Morais was a well-known Goan performer associated with the khell tiatr tradition, a form of Konkani folk theater. Khell tiatrs were also interchangeably referred to as "folk plays" in the region. Morais was regarded as a role model and influential figure for the new generation of khell tiatr artists and folk play performers in Goa. According to a postgraduate study on English published material, the millennial and second-generation khell artist Malita Fernandes identified Morais as one of her favorite writers and directors of Konkani folk plays. In the 2018 book Konkani Khell Tiatr by historian Wilson Mazarello, Konkani playwright Tomazinho Cardozo characterized Morais as being among the popular khellam mestris or Goan street play teachers of the past. Mazarello's work further stated that Morais was included in the list of prominent actors in khells, who were known as khellgodde in the local Konkani language. Morais occupied a significant position and wielded an influence within the traditional Konkani folk theater tradition of khell tiatrs in Goa.

== Personal life ==
Morais's brother Antonio was a known figure in the khell tiatr tradition, a form of Konkani street theater. Antonio was credited as one of three key individuals who helped bring zomnivhele khells (street plays) to the professional stage, drawing inspiration from the Konkani tiatr format. Tiburcio, the elder brother of Morais, started his professional career as a toddy tapper before taking up a job of a seafarer. Morais and Antonio shared a close bond, as Morais exclusively participated in his brother's fells or khells. Antonio as the playwright, ensured that whenever Morais appeared in his theatrical productions, it was promoted under Morais's name.

Morais was married to Lourdes (later known as Lurdinha) Pereira, a homemaker from Sanguem. Together they had three children - two sons, Joaquim (born 1959) and Inácio (born 1958), as well as a daughter named Crucifina (born 1962). Morais' extended family, including his nephews, were also actively involved in the Konkani theater scene. Playwright R. Moraes and former playwright and theatre actor Teles Moraes, along with trumpeter Seby Moraes, are nephews of Morais through his brothers Tiburcio and Antonio, respectively. Although Morais was born in Assolda, he listed Paroda, Quepem as his birthplace on his children's birth certificates. He died at his residence in Pulvaddo, Benaulim on 24 March 1990.
