= Shalibai =

Indian actor and singer (1940–1980)

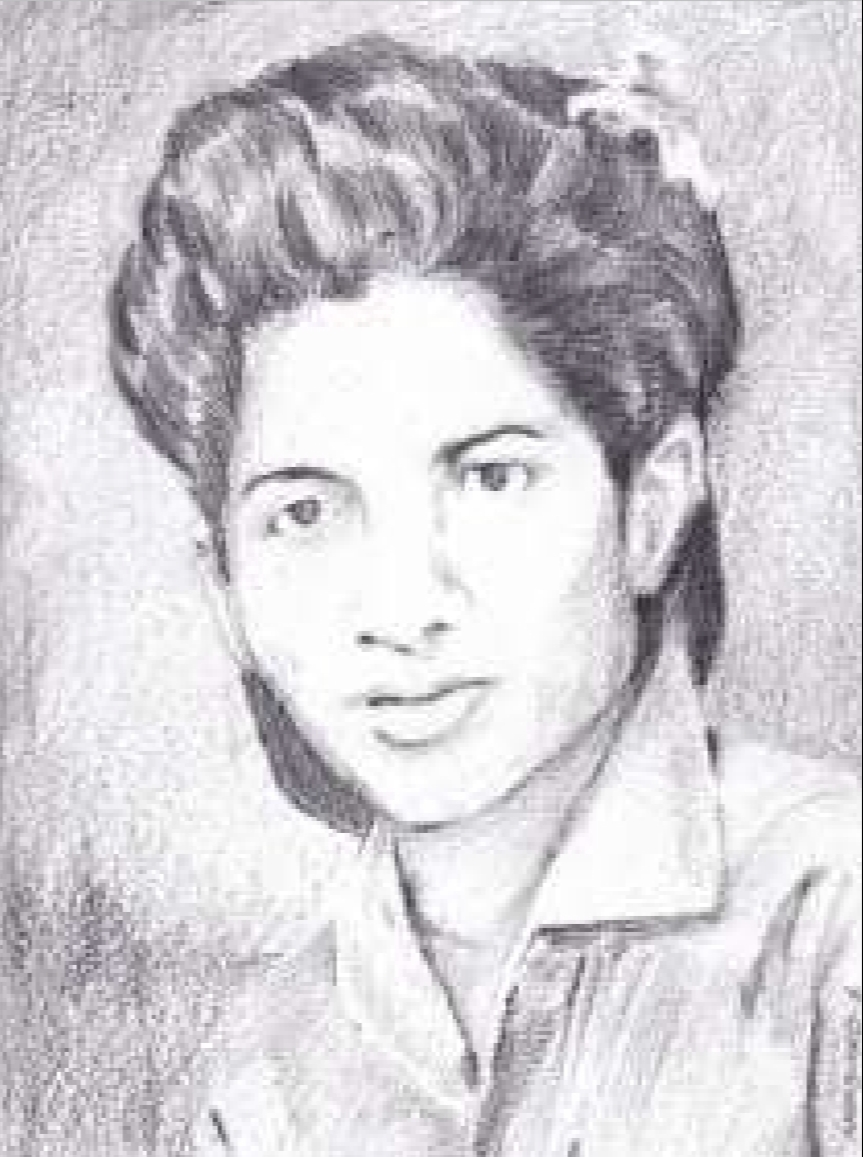
- Portrait of Fernandes during his youth
- Born: Francisco Fernandes; 12 January 1940; Paroda, Goa, Portuguese India
- Died: 9 February 1980 (aged 40); Aquem, Goa, India
- Other names: Francis de Paroda; Xalibai
- Occupations: Actor; singer; composer
- Years active: 1960s–1980

Francisco Fernandes (12 January 1940 – 9 February 1980), known professionally as Francis de Paroda or Shalibai, was an Indian actor, singer, and composer known for his work in khell and tiatr (theatre) productions.

== Early life ==
Francisco Fernandes was born on 12 January 1940 in the village of Paroda, Goa, which was part of Portuguese India during the Portuguese Empire (now located in India) to Peter Fernandes. The Fernandes family established their residence in the village of Benaulim, Goa, attracted by the favorable conditions available for expanding their toddy tapping enterprise in the region.

== Career ==
Fernandes was a versatile artist known for his proficiency as a composer, singer, and character actor. His talent extended beyond his musical contributions, as he made an impact in the realm of traditional Goan street plays known as khell. While initially gaining recognition in tiatrs, a distinctive form of Goan musical theater, Fernandes garnered acclaim for his portrayal of female characters through his adeptness as a female impersonator. Fernandes became a popular figure in the world of khell performances, particularly in the fell or khells crafted by Konkani khell playwright A. Moraes in the Salcete taluka region. His portrayal of a Hindu female character named "Xalibai" or Shalibai was so memorable that he earned the moniker "Shalibai" from his audiences. Fernandes later ventured into creating his own khell productions, solidifying his position as a teacher and mentor in the realm of folk plays. Among Fernandes's khell works are Kaido Kumparponnacho (Rule of an Affair), Bodmas (Wicked), Noxib (Luck), Dothichem Kestaum (Quarrel of Dhoti), and Corit To Bhogit (You reap what you sow). The mere announcement of "Xalibayelo fell yeta" (Shalibai's fell is coming) would generate eager anticipation and enthusiasm within the community, regardless of whether Fernandes was the creator of the production or partaking in the presentations of other khell mestris (khell teachers). Fernandes's contributions solidified his status as one of the popular khell mestris, alongside figures like Niclau Marian from Vhodlem Bhatt, Benaulim, Don Toclo from Colva, F. Coloi, and Bhataghotto. Additionally, he gained recognition and popularity as a khellgoddo (khell actor).

Fernandes was also described as a figure among the early khell performers, alongside artists such as Anton Marie, Santiago Pereira, Menino Afonso, Marian Silva, Diniz Sequeira, Antonio Moraes, Patrick Dourado, Khell Jose, Buk Buko, Don Toclo, Xempea Minguel, Khadda Minguel, Socorro Piedade Fernandes, and Magnier Rod. Active during the 1960s, they made significant contributions to the traditional Goan street plays also known as zom'nivoilea khell. Even today, Fernandes and his fellow artists are remembered for their cantos (songs). Their plays were regarded as enlightening, with the opening and featured songs being particularly praised for their delightful nature. In addition, the music of Fernandes and other artists was quite regarded in the past, but today in the contemporary tiatr era, there are a multitude of musicians contributing to the scene. The lyrics of their play songs often took the form of riddles or proverbs. One distinguishing aspect of Fernandes' music and that of his contemporaries was its roots in the teachings of khell mestris (teachers). In the zomnivoilea khell tradition, singers would frequently perform long, intricate songs. Fernandes himself was a khellam mestri or khell xikoupi (khell teacher) of the era, actively engaged in teaching and staging khell performances.

Xallibai, also known as Shalibai, was a prominent character in khell folklore, immortalized alongside other figures like Battagotto (boiled rice grain) and Coli (tin). Xallibai was portrayed by Fernandes, who was among the deferential actors of the time, some of whom lacked formal education. The scripts used in the past khell performances of Fernandes's and artistes alike, were regarded for their richness and distinctiveness compared to contemporary tiatr productions. Theater director Roseferns observed that the emergence of commercial tiatr productions has been a key factor in the waning influence and viewership of khell tiatr performances within the theatrical landscape. The introduction of John de Parra (Antonio Jose Trindade) as a prompter in Carnival khells, typically staged during the Carnival season in Goa, was a contribution made by Fernandes. John, an actor and painter in the Indian Navy, not only provided prompt cues but also displayed his talent as a performer. Another significant member of Fernandes's cast was Peter de Benaulim, who made his professional debut on the Konkani stage in Fernandes's production titled Modkeak Lagon (Because of Matka). Peter, the son of Francis Tembo, went on to establish himself as an actor, singer, and playwright. Fernandes, along with individuals such as Don Toclo, Niclau Marian, Santiago Pereira from Cotombi-Quepem, Menino Afonso, Magnier Rod, Socorro Piedade, Anton Moraes, Vitorino Pereira, Patrick Dourado, and Ligorio Fernandes, made unique contributions to the traditional khell performances. Their collective efforts helped shape and preserve the cultural heritage of khell in the region.

== Personal life ==
Not much is known about Fernandes's early or personal life, and very little information about him is available both online and offline. Apart from his involvement in the Konkani stage, he was a toddy tapper by profession. On 9 February 1980, Fernandes died at Aquem Alto in the city of Margao, Goa at the age of 40.
