= Comedienne Joana =

Comedian and actress (born 1966)

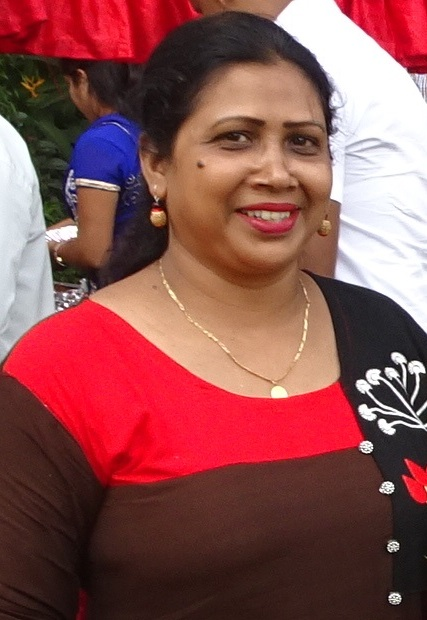
- Pereira at the Kala Academy, 2018
- Born: Joaquina Joana Fernandes; 10 March 1966 (age 59); Benaulim, Goa, India
- Other names: Comedian Joana; Joana Pereira
- Occupations: Comedian; actress; singer; playwright; director
- Years active: c. 1976–present
- Spouse: Manuel Pereira (m. 1990)
- Children: 2
- Father: Francis Tembo

Joaquina Joana Pereira (née Fernandes; born 10 March 1966), known professionally as Comedienne Joana, is a comedian, actress, singer, playwright, and director based in London, UK. She is known for her work in Konkani cinema and tiatr productions.

== Early life ==
Joaquina Joana Pereira was born on 10 March 1966 in Benaulim, Goa, India, to Francisco Boavida Fernandes and Severina Piedade Fernandes. She was born into a Goan Catholic family, with a homemaker mother. Joaquina grew up with five siblings: Mariano "Peter" (born 1961), Maria (born 1963), Margarita "Maggie" (born 1969), Lonita, and Convy. Pereira's family background included involvement in traditional theatrical practices in her community. Her father, Francisco balanced his occupation as a carpenter with a side involvement in local khell theater as an actor (khellgoddo), as well as street theater productions known as zomnivoile khells. During the preparation for these theatrical productions, rehearsals and practices frequently occurred within the family residence, allowing Pereira and her siblings to absorb the songs and dramatic elements by listening in.

Francisco often brought his children to witness the khell performances, where he later initiated Pereira, then 5 years old, into the art of acting, allowing her to take on roles as a child artist. Pereira and her siblings were known in their school community for their singing abilities, and they would take part in tiatrs, or local theatrical productions, as singers, being referred to as "Tembo's children". Pereira's involvement in the arts extended to the religious life of her community as well. During the Lenten season, she would sing the hymn "Veronica" at her local church as part of the "passion" observances.

Pereira began her career in the traditional Goan theater form known as khell tiatrs at a young age. At the age of 10, Lampião Agustin invited her to perform a solo singing role on stage in a khell tiatr production. When she performed, the song she sang had originated from a khell show that her father had previously produced. Pereira later became involved with two khell tiatr companies led by Patrick Dourado. She was initially part of Dourado's B group, performing in their production Tin Vantte (Three Divisions), while Dourado's A group was enacting the play Deu Borem Korum (May God do good). During this time, Pereira embarked on her maiden journey to the city of Bombay, now known as Mumbai, to engage in the Tin Vantte performances, choosing to travel via a steamboat for the expedition.

At one point, in Dourado's theatrical ensemble, the principal actress Lalita had to withdraw from the performance. Consequently, he made the decision to promote Pereira from the B group to the A group, entrusting her with the role vacated by Lalita in Deu Borem Korum. Pereira continued with the A group for the second round of Deu Borem Korum shows in Bombay. Prior to her work with Dourado, Pereira had also participated in tiatr productions at the village level. After her time with Dourado's companies, Pereira collaborated with a number of other popular Goan theatre practitioners, including Rosario Rodrigues, Milagres de Chandor, Pascoal Rodrigues, Premanand Lotlikar, Prince Jacob, Mario Menezes, Mariano Fernandes, and Tony Dias, among others.

== Career ==
In July 2015, Pereira was cast in the tiatr Modhli Vatt (Middle Way), which was directed by Sandeep Kalangutkar. She portrayed a comedic character in the production, performing alongside a quartet of other actors including John D' Silva, Brian, and Aston. Pereira also sang a solo number during the tiatr which was met with an encore from the audience. Several months later, in August 2015, she was again cast in a tiatr, this time in Bailek Dukh, Kumarik Sukh (Wife's Pain, Mistress's Happiness) directed by Conception de Tuem. Similar to her previous role, she took on a comedic part, performing alongside fellow comedic actors Jane, Humbert, and Luis Bachan.

Pereira was involved in several artistic projects in 2015. In May of that year, she was cast in the Konkani tiatr (theatrical production) Amkam Kiteak Poddlam (Why Should We Bother?), directed by Mario Menezes. She portrayed one-half of a comedy duo in the production, performing alongside Comedian Sally. Later in 2015, in August, Pereira unveiled her sixth Konkani VCD (video compact disc) film titled Tukai Nam Makai Nam (Not You, Nor Me). The film was brought to life through the production efforts of J M Movies production company, and she was cast in the lead role of Bula, a character with a speech impediment. As part of the film, she also performed a duet alongside fellow Konkani artist Tony de Ribandar, focusing on themes relevant to society.

In August 2015, Pereira was cast in the tiatr production Osleo Suno (Such Daughter-in-Laws), which was directed by Tony de Ribandar. She portrayed a comic character named Avchit, appearing in a quartet alongside fellow performers Comedian Sally, Luis Bachan, and Dorothy. Her performance was well-received, with her being given an encore for a solo song she sang. Prior to this 2015 role, Pereira had acted in tiatrs produced by her husband Manuel in the late 1980s, taking on substantial parts. Following that period, she has maintained a presence in tiatrs overseen by diverse popular figures within the Konkani theatrical landscape. Pereira is noted for frequently taking on comedic roles in her tiatr work.

In July 2014, Pereira directed a tiatr titled Novo Dis Udetanam (When the New Day Dawned), which was written by her husband, Manuel. The production had a total of 17 performances. Manuel has acknowledged that his tiatrs have struggled to gain widespread popularity, citing luck as a contributing factor. Since marrying Manuel, during her professional endeavors, Pereira has included in her repertoire all the Konkani songs crafted by her husband. Additionally, she has assumed the role of director for the tiatrs written by Manuel.

== Personal life ==
Her husband, Manuel, is a fellow Konkani playwright, ghostwriter, and lyricist who hailed from the neighborhood of Vaddem in Vasco da Gama. Pereira's siblings also chose to follow professional paths in the fields of tiatr and khell tiatr, traditional forms of drama and entertainment popular in Goa. As of 2018, she resides in Vaddem, Vasco da Gama.
