= Antonio Moraes =

Indian playwright and director (1924–2012)

- Moraes in his later years
- Born: Antonio Morais; 13 July 1924; Assolda, Goa, Portuguese India
- Died: 14 January 2012 (aged 87); Benaulim, Goa, India
- Other name: A. Moraes
- Occupations: Playwright; theatre director; trumpeter; bandleader; composer
- Years active: 1944–2000s
- Spouse: Antonieta Fernandes (m. 1961)
- Relatives: Xempea Minguel (brother)

Antonio Moraes (né Morais; 13 July 1924 – 14 January 2012), known professionally as A. Moraes, was an Indian playwright, theatre director, trumpeter, bandleader, and composer known for his work in khell (street play), folk plays, and tiatr (theatre) productions.

== Early life ==
Antonio Morais on 13 July 1924 in the village of Assolda in Portuguese Goa, into a Goan Catholic family as the fourth son of day laborers Paulo Morais and Conceiçaō Maria Fernandes, his mother being a native of Xeldem, Goa. His three older brothers were Tiburcio (born 1918), Zpeferino (born 1916), and Miguel (born 1922). At the age of 10, his family moved to the same town where he commenced his education at the local parochial school in Benaulim. When Moraes was 15 years old, he was admitted to this same parochial school by his older brother Tiburcio, who worked as a seafarer.

During his time as a student, Moraes received instruction in several musical disciplines. He learned to play the rebec, studied the theory of solfeggio, and gained skills in musical composition. Moraes was instructed in violin by a teacher named Roque mestri, mastering a wide range of disciplines over a period of about 1 to 2 years. At a young age, Moraes' father, Paulo, died. His older brother Tiburcio, who had previously worked as a toddy tapper before becoming a seafarer, took on the responsibility of caring for him and his other siblings. As Moraes and his siblings were still minors, their mother Conceição struggled to support the family on her own. To supplement the household income, Conceição arranged for her children to take on work in other local homes as they grew older. After completing his schooling, Moraes finished his primeiro grau (first grade) in Portuguese education.

Moraes' musical talent was recognized by his brother Tiburcio, who brought him a trumpet after returning from a sea voyage, within a year or two of completing schooling. Moraes quickly mastered the instrument. He was subsequently recruited by brass band leaders in his vicinity and nearby areas to showcase his trumpet skills during various cultural events like "alvorada" (a musical tradition performed by residents of Goa during early morning hours on days of religious or cultural celebrations), village festivals, and funeral ceremonies. This musical work provided Moraes with a source of income. Moraes' trumpet playing caught the attention of John Rodrigues of Sanvordem, the brother of another local musician named Abdon Rodrigues. John formally invited Moraes to join his musical ensemble. Moraes later transitioned his focus from a music career spanning 1944 to 1949 towards engaging in street plays known as zomnivhele khells.

== Career ==
Moraes played a pivotal role in the mid-20th century khell culture of Goa. His initially was involved participating in performances at carnival khells and tiatrs. Moraes began his career by creating music and content for carnival-themed khell productions. Santiago Pereira, a khellam-mestri (street play instructor), introduced him to this theatrical tradition. Moraes then became known as a writer, crafting several original carnival plays over the course of two years. His carnival plays, which featured musical elements, gained popularity among Goan audiences. Some of his known works included Munddkar Nores (Tenant Nores), Utor (Word), Xalli, Amjele Put Inspekttor, Sorg (Heaven), Mhojim Bhurgim (Our Children), Amje Put Dotor, and Zolmachi Khomptti, among others. The plays Xalli and Zolmachi Khomptti were particularly beloved by carnival attendees. In addition to his playwriting, Moraes also made innovations in the realm of costume design for carnival khell productions. Dissatisfied with the traditional use of pajama cloth costumes, Moraes began creating more character-appropriate attire for the performers in his plays. Moraes' work helped shape the cultural landscape of the region during the mid-20th century.

Moraes introduced significant changes to traditional khell performances. Khell productions had historically utilized the instruments "dhol" and "kax" (percussion). He replaced these with a drum set and incorporated the banjo as well. He also broadened the instrumental palette of khell by adding trumpet, clarinet, and saxophone. Similar khellam-mestris similarly emulated this behavior. Another contribution by Moraes was his engagement of the first female artist, Anita de Chinchinim, to perform in a khell production in 1959, he also introduced another female cast, Milagrin from Colva in the same production. This marked a departure from the previously all-male casts of khell performances. In February 1959, Moraes introduced the first performance of a khell play during carnival season, which was presented on a custom-built stage by Domingo Pidade "Dumpidad" Sequeira at Sirvoddem in Navelim. This innovation in staging helped elevate the khell theatrical form. Moraes is credited as the first individual to produce a "khell tiatr" - a distinct type of khell performance. For this, he is regarded as the founder of the khell tiatr genre. The khell tiatr productions initiated by Moraes expanded to the city of Bombay in 1962. His khell-tiatrs were performed at various venues in the city, including P. T. Bhangwadi, St. Mary's Hall Mazagaon, and locations in Parel, Santa Cruz, and Bandra, among others. During their time in Bombay, Goan tiatrists M. Boyer and Jephsis Hitler were affiliated with Moraes' theatrical ensemble. Moraes' innovations and adaptations played a pivotal role in the growth and popularization of the khell theatrical form.

Moraes founded a wedding musical ensemble bearing his name, "A. Moraes,". However, his primary artistic focus was on his work as a trumpet player for tiatr productions. He served as the musical director and bandleader for several tiatr dramatists, including Aleixinho de Candolim, Nelson Afonso, M. Dod de Verna, M. Boyer, and C. Alvares. He frequently worked as a performer in the annual tiatr competitions conducted by the Kala Academy. Beyond his tiatr work, Moraes also created musical content for Goan folk theater productions broadcast on All India Radio, and produced his own original folk plays. Moraes was also known as a lyricist, often crafting new songs upon request. He launched three albums featuring his original musical creations, for which he also orchestrated the arrangements. The album titles were Devacho Ghutt, Pormollit Fulam, and Ami Tiatrist. According to tiatr scholar Michael Jude Gracias, Moraes made "significant strides in transforming the traditional carnival fell or khell performance into a more refined stage production, pioneering the term "khell tiatr". This innovative staging format was subsequently continued by other tiatr artists like A. M. Pacheco, Ligorio Rodrigues, Patrick Dourado, Epa de Paroda, Vitorino Pereira etc., until Rosario Rodrigues subsequently pioneered the development of the non-stop drama style. By the end of his career, Moraes had written and directed more than 50 khell tiatr productions.

According to writer Wilson Mazarello, the khell had already been incorporated into stage productions, Moraes was who worked himself to systematically improving the quality and presentation of the khell. Mazarello notes that Moraes was singularly focused to enhance the standards of khell performances. He aimed to elevate the khell tradition, pushing it towards higher levels of refinement. One of Moraes' innovations was the replacement of the traditional "modd" a march-like drumbeat with a melodic musical introduction to the opening song. Furthermore, he incorporated musical intervals between song verses. Furthermore, Mazarello's account highlights Moraes' modernization of the khell's musical structure. Moraes assembled a full orchestra, incorporating instruments such as trumpet, saxophone, rhythm guitar, bass guitar, and a complete drum set-mirroring the musical accompaniment commonly used in Konkani tiatrs. This evolution was made possible by Moraes' proficiency in music, as he was a musician with the ability to read, write, and create musical compositions, having studied under the tutelage of mestri Santiago Pereira of Paroda, Quepem.

Moraes made several contributions to the evolution of the khell and khell tiatr productions in the mid-20th century. Prior to his interventions, khell productions utilized a whistle or other auditory signal to cue the musicians to begin playing the introductory music. Moraes moved away from this practice, instead providing the musicians with verbal prompts or keyword indications within the dialogue to trigger the start of the musical introduction. Another longstanding convention in khell theater was the uniform dress code, whereby each performer in the troupe wore corresponding cotton garments styled as pajamas. Moraes diverged from this customary practice by designing each actor's costume to suit the specific character they were depicting during their performance.

The performance of female roles by male actors was also a well-established practice in khell, as women were often reluctant to participate in these productions. Moraes made efforts to involve female performers, and cast Anita Pereira (later known as Anita de Chinchinim or Anita de Goa) in the lead role of his 1959 production Munddkar Nores, marking the first time a woman had appeared on the khell stage. Recognizing the necessity to unify the khell and tiatr theatrical styles, Moraes started labeling his works as khell tiatr to symbolize this fusion. This new terminology was subsequently adopted by other Goan theater groups and "khell tiatr" as the accepted name for this evolving performance style. Moraes' innovations are credited with elevating the overall quality and professionalism of khell productions, setting a new standard that was emulated by other theater companies in Goa.

Moraes's works had a significant impact on the broader theatrical landscape of the time. Other mestris (playwrights or directors) working within the Konkani theater tradition were inspired to emulate the production qualities and innovations pioneered by Moraes. This led to the adoption of a new format for Konkani stage productions. Whereas previously such works had simply been referred to as "khells" (street plays), playwrights like Patrick Dourado, Succur Piedade Fernandes, and Vitorino Pereira began branding their productions as khell-tiatrs. The fundamental framework of the khell-tiatr format comprised two distinct plays (don parteo), each lasting around 90 minutes. One play would be staged before the intermission, and the other after it, leading to a combined duration of slightly over 3 hours.

The concept of staging two plays in the khell-tiatr model, following Moraes' lead, was adopted by the succeeding generation of mestris. These included Rosario Rodrigues, Minino de Bandar, Ligorio Fernandes, R. Moraes, A.M. Pacheco, Rosario Dias, Roseferns, Christopher Leitão, and Pascoal Rodrigues. For over a decade, this format remained the dominant paradigm in Konkani theater, contributing to the commercial success of these playwrights and their respective theater troupes. However, the mestris of this era still strove to elevate the Konkani theatrical tradition to the standards set by the original tiatr works. Ongoing efforts towards refinement and improvement were required to fully realize that level of quality.

== Personal life ==
Moraes resided in the ward of Pulwado in Benaulim, Goa. His elder brother, Miguel Morais, was also actively involved in the production of khell tiatrs. The two brothers shared a close bond, with Miguel exclusively participating in Moraes' theatrical productions. Moraes ensured that each time Miguel participated in his theatrical productions, they were advertised under the name of his brother, known as "Xempea Minglilo Fell". On 25 March 1990, Miguel died at his residence in Pulwado, Benaulim, at the age of 68. Moraes married Antonieta Fernandes, a homemaker from Chinchinim, Goa, on 9 May 1961. Together, they had at least five children; three sons, Mario (born 1967), Carlito (born 1962), and Pedro (born 1964), as well as two daughters, Sanita (born 1969) and Kuanita (born 1972).

Moraes's wife Antonieta, frequently took part in his theatrical works. One of the khell tiatrs in which Antonieta featured was the production titled Axek Lobdolo (Engulfed in Greed). In addition to his work in the performing arts, Moraes engaged in several other occupations, including as a tailor, toddy tapper, and carpenter. He had two sons who followed in his footsteps in the Konkani stage. His son Mario, better known as Seby, worked as a trumpeter on the Konkani stage. Moraes' other son, Carlito, a drummer by contributing to his tiatrs. Carlito later pursued his musical career by joining the band V4U. Towards the later stage of his life, Moraes eventually withdrew from active involvement in the Konkani theater scene. In a personal account he penned around 2007, Moraes noted that his old age had rendered him unable to play musical instruments, and that he had grown increasingly dependent on his personal physician, Dr. Telaulikar, to whom he entrusted some of his unpublished biographical information.

Moraes died on 14 January 2012, aged 87, at his residence in Pulwado, Benaulim.
