= Osvi Viegas =

Indian singer and composer (born 1949)

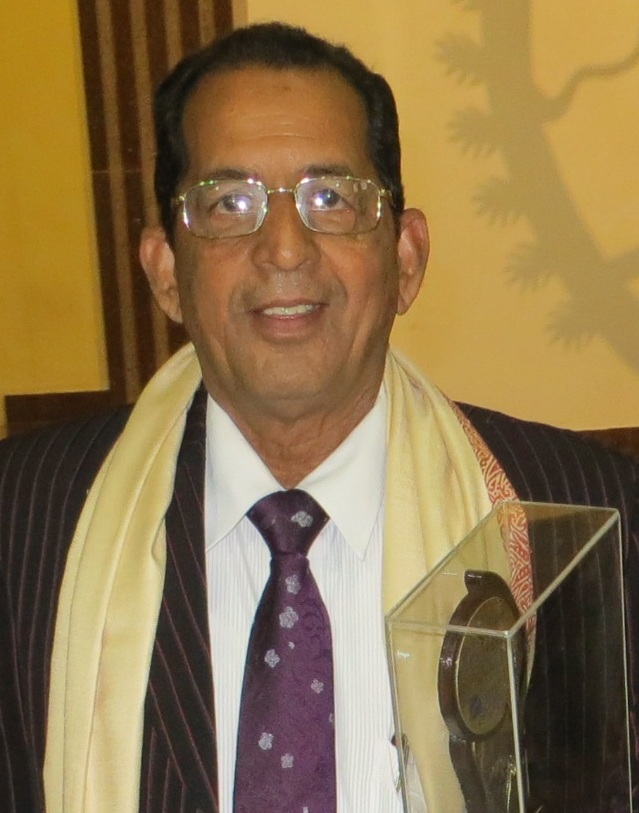
- Viegas at Ravindra Bhavan, Margao in 2013
- Born: Osvi Sebastião Cruz Lourdes Viegas; 11 February 1949 (age 77); Margão, Goa, Portuguese India, Portuguese Empire
- Other names: Master Osvi Viegas; Osvy Viegas
- Occupations: Singer; composer; actor; playwright; theatre director
- Years active: 1958–present
- Spouse: Maria Fernandes (m. 1981)
- Children: 4

Osvi Sebastião Cruz Lourdes Viegas (11 February 1949) is an Indian singer, composer, theatre actor, playwright, and theatre director who works on the Konkani stage.

== Early life ==
Osvi Sebastião Cruz Lourdes Viegas was born on 11 February 1949 in Margão, Goa, which was part of Portuguese India during the Portuguese Empire. He was born to Antonio Francisco Xavier Viegas, a police corporal of Polícia de Segurança Pública during the Portuguese regime, who hailed from Cuncolim, Goa, and Luzia Raimunda Figueiredo, a homemaker who hailed from Carmonã, Goa, into a Goan Catholic family. Both of his parents were based in Margão. Viegas had a younger brother, Olavo (born 1952). His paternal grandparents had Goan Hindu ancestry from the Naique and Dessai clans. Viegas completed his Segundo Grau (transl. First Grade) in Portuguese and later his Secondary School Certificate after the liberation of Goa.

== Career ==
Viegas is a tiatr artist initially known for his work as a child performer and later as a singer. On 8 December 1958, at the age of 9, he embarked on his professional stage career as a child artist in the theatrical production Tuka Lagon (Because of You), under the direction and writing of Mog Joaquim. The subsequent year, in 1959, Viegas took on an acting role in another tiatr named Gharachi Durdoxea, which was also crafted and directed by Joaquim. In 1960, Viegas participated in a theatrical production organized by Isdorio Cruz who hailed from Varca, Goa. The following year, 1961, Viegas faced a personal loss when his father was fatally shot, prompting his family to move to Bombay. Despite this upheaval, Viegas pursued his education in Bombay. During his time in Bombay, Viegas caught the attention of a family friend named Carlos when he was singing Konkani songs from Goan tiatrs. Carlos then connected Viegas with the well-known tiatrist C. Alvares. Impressed by Viegas' solo vocal abilities Alvares said to him "You are perfect match to sing on professional stage", and cast him in two of his own productions in 1962- Bhattam Anim Bessam penned by Kid Boxer and helmed by Alvares. and Patki Nhoim Ghatki (Not a Sinner, a Traitor). By 1963, Viegas had gained recognition on the Konkani tiatr stage under the moniker Master Osvi Viegas. During that year, Anthony Mendes, then a leading tiatrist, formally invited Alvares to cast Viegas in a role for his theatrical performance named Goemkar Te Goemkar (Goans are Goans).

The tiatr production Goemkar te Goemkar was a significant milestone in the career of Viegas. This tiatr garnered attention and featured three separate performances over the course of three consecutive days. Throughout the shows, Viegas exhibited his musical range by presenting three unique songs. One of Viegas's musical offerings, a piece rooted in the regional Kunbi style, was particularly well received by the audience. The response from the crowd led Viegas to encore the song, performing it a second time in response to the audience's demands. The positive reception of Viegas's performance did not go unnoticed. The popular vocalist Luciano Dias expressed admiration for Viegas's abilities and authored commendatory critiques of the tiatr in the Konkani language periodicals Cine Times and Goa Times, both then-leading publications in circulation within Goa. This coverage ultimately reached Viegas's mother, who resided in the region. Concerned about her son's involvement in the Bombay (now Mumbai) theater scene, Viegas's mother took action, requiring him to retum to Goa. In order to cultivate discipline, she decided to enroll him in a boarding school located in Pilar, Goa. However, Viegas's passion for the performing arts could not be extinguished, and he continued his involvement in school-based singing and drama activities with the guidance of school authorities, including the principal, Fr. P. Nazareth, Bro. Peter Cardozo, and Alex D'Souza, who later pursued careers in priesthood and music, respectively.

Viegas had a diverse career spanning both tiatr and khell tiatr productions. In the period of his academic break, he was chosen by a popular director to star in a tiatr production called Konn Zait ti Ostori (Who is that Woman?), which was presented in multiple venues across the region of Goa. This engagement marked the start of Viegas' extensive involvement in Goan theater. Following this initial tiatr role, Viegas went on to collaborate with several popular khell tiatr directors, including Menino Afonso, Mariano Silva, Jess Fernandes, Socorro Piedade Fernandes, Shalibai, Antonio Moraes, Ligorio Fernandes, Felly Lucas, and Diniz Sequeira, among others. The directors engaged Viegas for his unique "secondary vocal quality", which he adeptly utilized to present the kantos (songs) during their stage performances. Viegas acknowledged the influence of Patrick Dourado, his mentor in the art of composing songs. Prior to developing his own songwriting skills, Viegas benefited from Dourado's guidance and assistance in crafting musical pieces. In addition to his work in khell tiatr, Viegas mainly had a career as a tiatrist, performing alongside a wide range of well-known artists, such as C. Alvares, Anthony Mendes, A. R. Souza Ferrão, Remmie Colaço, Alfred Rose, Jacinto Vaz, Robin Vaz, J. P. Souzalin, Ophelia Cabral, Philomena Braz, Antonette Mendes, Anil Kumar, Joe Rose, Mike Mehta, F. Cardozo, Menino de Bandar, Comedian Ambe, Comedian Agostinho, Mario Menezes, and Chris-Meena, among others.

Viegas was active in the performing arts during the mid 20th and early 21st centuries. In the year 1975, he visited Dubai, United Arab Emirates, to engage in a stage production. This show was crafted by Alberto and his brother, under the direction of Joe Frank, Eddy, and Viegas himself. Chris Perry portrayed the role of the bandmaster in this production. After fulfilling his agreed-upon duties in Dubai, Viegas went back to his native region of Goa, India. There, he started participating in traditional Konkani stage plays called tiatrs.

As of 2019, over the course of his career, Viegas is estimated to have performed between 600 and 800 songs across a variety of media, including cassettes, audio recordings, videos, CDs, and live stage performances. His repertoire spanned multiple genres, such as solo, duet, and trio pieces, and involved collaborations with several directors and producers. Viegas also made appearances on All India Radio and Goa Doordarshan, the state-run television network. In addition to his work as a performer, Viegas was also a composer, creating over 400 songs, some of which were featured on national and regional broadcast outlets. He also produced his own commercial recordings, including cassettes and CDs.

Viegas was actively involved in the creative processes behind several popular tiatrs. He was the mastermind behind the acclaimed theatrical work Jimmy and the creative force responsible for the tiatr Guneanvkari Unni. Additionally, he directed more than 15 tiatrs by the year 2012. Some of Viegas' most well-known acting and singing roles were in the tiatrs Meera, Dha Lakh, and Police-I. Throughout his career, Viegas also toured extensively, performing Konkani tiatrs in various Gulf countries and European nations.

== Personal life ==
As of 2012, Viegas resides in Igrejaward, Carmona, Goa, his mother's hometown. Viegas's father, a police corporal of Portuguese India, was shot to death at around 39 years old.

=== 2013 physical assault ===
On 27 April 2013, Viegas, aged 64, submitted a report to the Margao police, accusing two up-and-coming Konkani stage actors of assaulting him. According to the complaint, the incident occurred on 23 April, at 7 pm, while anticipating the appearance of his theatrical ensemble at the KTC bus stand in Margao, Viegas was present. The complaint stated that Comedienne Anita (Anita Fernandes), aged 24, came up to Viegas and challenged him regarding a song he had sung that portrayed her in a negative light. Viegas made accusations of being subjected to verbal abuse and physical assault, including a slap from Fernandes and singer Francis de Tuem. Viegas also alleged that threats were made against him and that his gold chain went missing during the incident. In response, the Margao police registered a non-cognizable case against Fernandes and de Tuem under various sections of the Indian Penal Code, including 323 (voluntarily causing hurt), 504 (intentional insult with intent to provoke breach of the peace), 427 (mischief causing damage), and 506 (criminal intimidation). Francis was specifically charged for the alleged slapping incident.

The same day on 27 April, in an interview with The Times of India, Viegas insisted that the pair should face consequences for their behavior. Accompanied by a significant group of supporters showing solidarity, he was taken to the police station. As per Viegas' account to the authorities, the altercation started with Anita slapping him, alleging that he had composed a song about her, accusations which Viegas refuted. He affirmed his adherence to non-violence by opting to refrain from physical retaliation, citing his principles as the basis for his choice to avoid resorting to physical aggression, despite having the capacity to do so. Viegas then made an accusation that Francis, upon his arrival, proceeded to forcefully push him to the ground, resulting in a physical altercation. He stated that he suffered physical harm to his body and presented a medical report to law enforcement documenting his injuries. Viegas' colleagues at the police station commended his role as a mentor within the younger generation and his prominence in the Konkani tiatr industry, while also expressing disapproval of the alleged assault.
