= Irene Vaz =

Former actress and singer (born 1966)

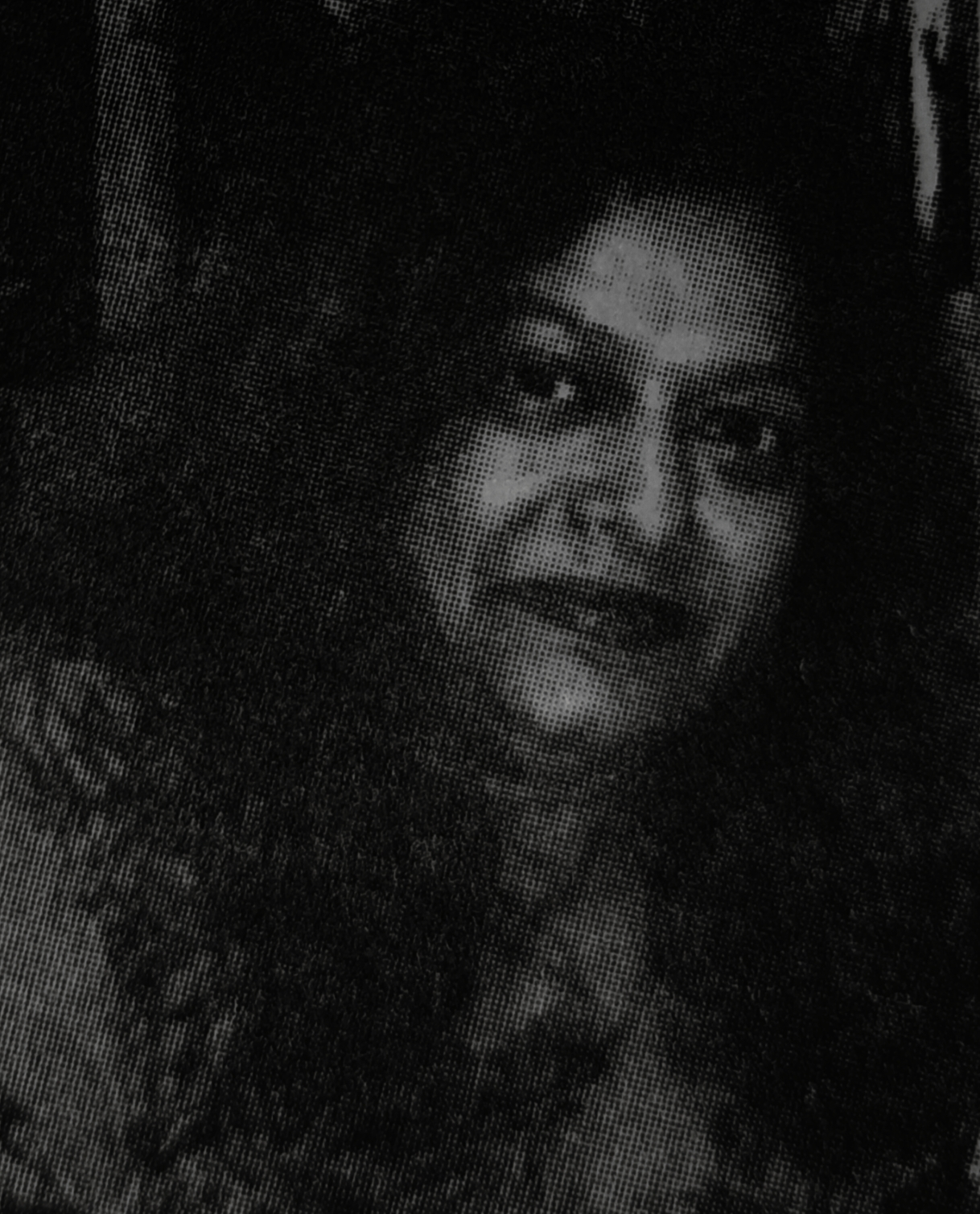
- Vaz in 2018
- Born: Irene Cardozo; 3 July 1966 (age 59); Chinchinim, Goa, India
- Education: Master of Arts (MA) in Philosophy
- Alma mater: St. Anthony's High School (S.S.C)
- Occupations: Actress; singer; amateur footballer
- Years active: c. 1981–2019 (theatre)
- Movement: Catholic Charismatic Renewal (CCR)
- Spouse: Sylvester Vaz (m. 1995)
- Children: 1
- Awards: KA's "Best Singer Award"
- Website: facebook.com/irenecardozoevaz

Irene Cardozo e Vaz (née Cardozo; born 3 July 1966) is a former actress, singer, and amateur footballer based in London, United Kingdom. She is known for her work in Konkani films and tiatr (theatre) productions.

== Early life ==
Vaz was born as Irene Cardozo on 3 July 1966 in Chinchinim, Goa, India, to Piedade Cardozo and Constanciana Cieza Luis, a homemaker. Vaz's family background is rooted in the tailoring industry, with her father specializing in men's suits. While demonstrating an aptitude for acting and singing during her formative years as a school student, she prioritised academic pursuits.

Vaz completed her Secondary School Certificate (SSC) at St. Anthony's High School, Assolna, graduating around 1981. Following this, she pursued higher education, earning a Master of Arts degree in philosophy. Vaz's early professional career included a period as a teacher at Perpetual Succour Convent High School, Navelim, prior to her move to Kuwait in 2005. Her parents' encouragement played a significant role in her acting career, which began in her youth. In her youth in Goa, Vaz was involved in competitions featuring one-act plays, which provided her with opportunities to cultivate and express her theatrical talents.

== Career ==
=== Early years ===
Vaz began acting professionally in Konkani theatre at the age of 15, following her secondary education. Her fellow villager, Mario Menezes, an actor from the town of Chinchinim, got her in contact with Rosario Rodrigues, a Konkani theatre director. Rodrigues was known for his scriptwriting and multiple theatrical productions. Vaz and Rodrigues subsequently collaborated on several tiatr plays, including Fulam ani Kolle, Dolle Ugddun Poi (Open your eyes and see), Fudlea Vorsa (The Upcoming Year), Ho Uzo Kedna Paloutolo (When will this fire be extinguished?), Ashram, and Hanv Kallokant Sandlim (I've lost in darkness).

=== Breakthrough role and subsequent collaborations ===
Vaz became famous in 1985 with a major role in Rodrigues' play Sopna (Dreams). She subsequently collaborated with Patrick Dourado in two productions, Tin Foggoteanche Marann and Nomoskar (Namaste). She also participated in productions by Konkani theatre professionals, such as M. Boyer and Prem Kumar. Her theatrical career continued with collaborations with directors such as Jose Rod, Prince Jacob, Fr. Planton Faria, Fr. Nevel Gracias, Pascoal Rodrigues, Tony Dias, and Mini Mario.

=== Move to Kuwait (2005–2015) ===
In 2005, Vaz moved to Kuwait to seek employment prospects. Despite this relocation, she maintained her involvement in tiatr, participating in various productions directed by local Goan directors in Kuwait.

=== Comeback in Goa and later recognition (2015–2019) ===
Returning to Goa around 2015, Vaz resumed her acting career. Shestinguished herself as a character actor. Her repertoire spanned a wide range of roles, but she demonstrated a particular affinity for dramatic characters. She had a meticulous approach to role preparation. In preparation for general rehearsals, she engaged in self-practice by reciting her lines and performance techniques while observing herself in a mirror at home. Her interest in acting was sparked by the teachings of the Parable of the Talents (Matthew 25:14–30). Vaz's work in theatre was further fueled by her faith.

As a longtime participant in the Catholic Charismatic Renewal movement, Vaz's spiritual beliefs played a role in shaping her life and career. Her husband, Sylvester Vaz, also played a role in her artistic pursuits by encouraging her to engage in acting. Vaz's foray into the world of theater commenced with khell tiatrs, a specific form of theatre. Following her marriage, she transitioned to the world of tiatrs, where she partnered with her husband to perform together as a duo, active as both, an actress and a singer. Vaz earned recognition for her dramatic performances, often referred to as the "Tragedy Queen" and the "Lighthouse of the Konkani Stage." Her theatrical career has taken her across the Middle East Gulf region.

== Personal life ==
Vaz was also an athlete in her younger days. In 1987, during her senior year of high school, she played for the Goa women's football team. During this period, she took part in various football tournaments hosted in Rajasthan and Delhi. She later worked in Kuwait for the Industrial Electrical Projects Company. Vaz has also spent her time in religious activities, serving as a catechist at the Holy Family Cathedral, Kuwait. She was a participating member of the St Joaquim & Anne Choir, performing alongside her husband, Sylvester, and son, Jeremiah, who played the keyboard.

Vaz encountered Sylvester, a Konkani actor who is two years younger than she is, while performing in Mario de Vasco's tiatr titled Dhump. Both were part of the cast in this production. She later went on to marry him. The couple has a son, Jeremiah (born 1998). He has pursued a career as a singer and keyboard player and has also performed on the Konkani stage, following his parents.

Vaz is a devout Catholic. After her marriage, she initially lived in her husband's ancestral hometown of Madel Grande, Margao. In 2015, following her return from Kuwait, she continued residing there. Eventually, she and her family relocated to London, UK, where they currently reside.
