= Comedian Sally =

Indian comedian and actor (born 1962)

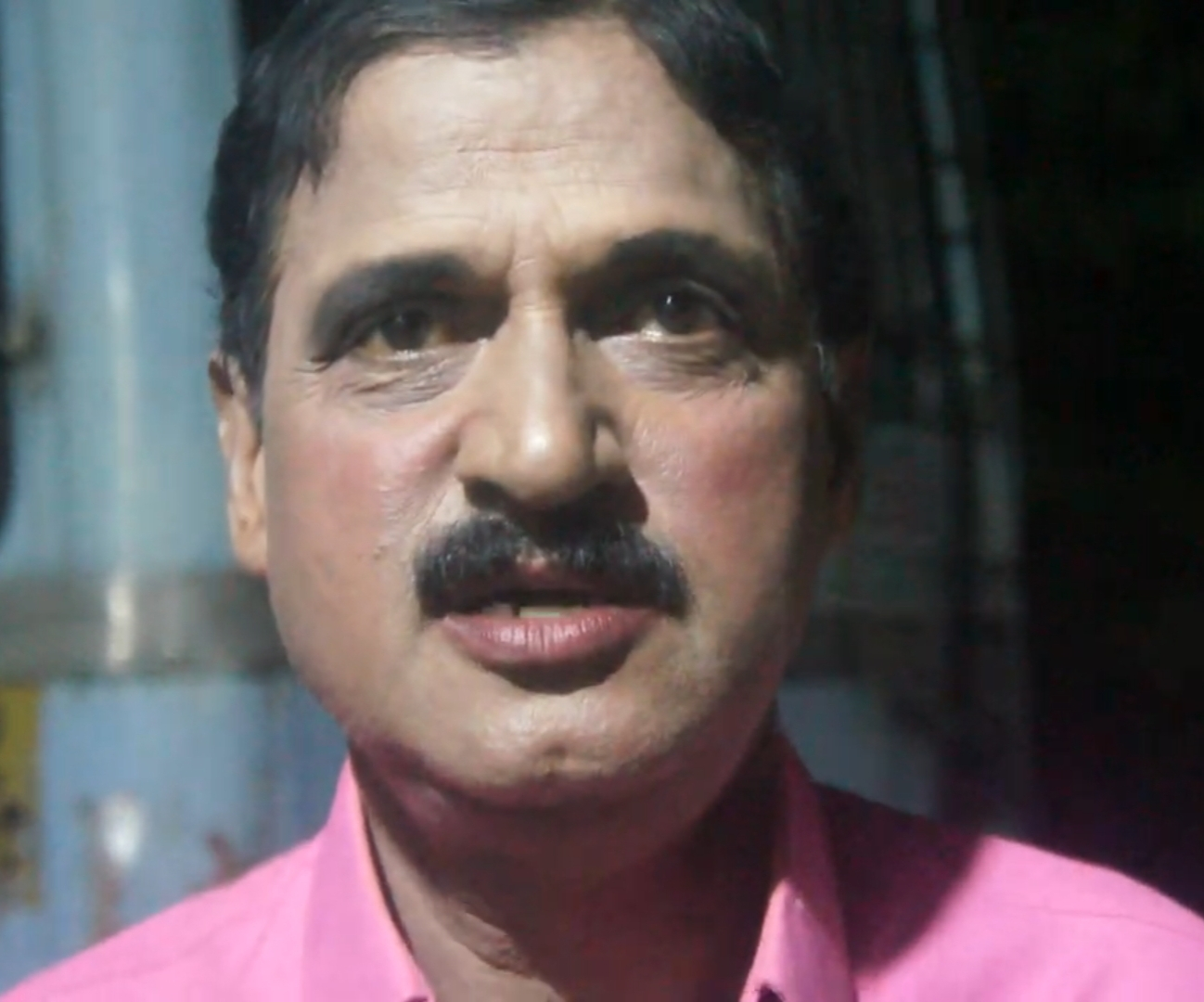
- Mascarenhas in 2023
- Born: Salvador Mascarenhas; 15 January 1962 (age 64); São José de Areal, Goa, India
- Occupations: Comedian; actor; playwright; director
- Years active: 1983–present
- Notable work: Kantaar (2019)
- Spouse: Micas Miranda (m. 1994)
- Children: 3
- Website: facebook.com/comedian.sally

Salvador Mascarenhas (born 15 January 1962), known professionally as Comedian Sally, is an Indian comedian, actor, playwright, and director known for his work in Konkani films and tiatr (theatre) productions. He made his debut as a child actor in a khell tiatr by Marceline Fernandes at the age of 8. Over a career spanning more than four decades, Mascarenhas has acted in over 450 tiatrs.

== Early life ==
Salvador Mascarenhas was born on 15 January 1962 in São José de Areal, Goa, India. His parents, Piedade Mascarenhas and Dioguinha Dias, were farmworkers. As a child, Mascarenhas participated in local theatrical activities in his village. At the age of 8, Marceline Fernandes, a seafarer and tiatrist (theatrical artist) hailing from São José de Areal, curated dramatic productions called khells that featured the participation of village boys. Marceline enlisted the young Mascarenhas to assume the role of a female character in these khell presentations, and his performance was well received.

Marceline would return from his maritime journeys annually to educate the young residents about the art of staging khell performances. Mascarenhas actively participated in Fernandes' annual khell productions for consecutive years following his introduction to the theatrical tradition. Then, when Mascarenhas reached the age of 13, during a village festival, Eulogio Fernandes curated a tiatr, which is a form of theatrical performance, to enhance the festivities. In this tiatr, titled Disgrasponn, Eulogio cast Mascarenhas in a comedic role, which was also acclaimed. From this point onward, Mascarenhas transitioned into a career as a professional comedian.

== Career ==
Mascarenhas and Lino Fernandes frequently collaborated on comedy skits that were integrated into tiatr productions. They preserved a collection of about six thoroughly practiced comedic performances that they would perform together as part of these theatrical works. In addition to his work as a performer, Fernandes later transitioned into becoming a tiatr playwright. He wrote and produced his own original tiatr plays. Mascarenhas continued to feature in comedic roles within Fernandes' self-authored productions. A tiatr by Fernandes, titled Dhorm (Religion), which cast Mascarenhas, garnered acclaim in the Goa region and was even presented to Goan communities residing in the Gulf states. The 1984 Gulf production of Dhorm featured additional artistic collaborators, including Konkani singer Alfred Rose and playwright-director Rosario Dias.

Following a certain point in time, Lino initiated employment within the maritime industry. Following this event, Succur Miranda, a playwright from São José de Areal, composed a theater piece titled Roma and included 22 year-old Mascarenhas in a significant role, leading to the play's popularity. Mascarenhas then joined the tiatr (a type of Konkani theatrical performance) production Jivit ek Nattok (Life Is a Play) by Ligorio Fernandes in 1985, where he performed a comedic role alongside other popular cast members. The production had an extensive run, with 50 shows performed. By this point, Mascarenhas had already established a career in tiatrs. Later, in the 1990s, he became affiliated with the Roseferns troupe and worked with them continuously for over 25 years. During his time with Roseferns, Mascarenhas also acted in tiatrs produced by ChrisMeena, including Gulfantli Girestkai (Riches of the Gulf), Aunddo (Craving), and Rinn (Debt), as well as a Roseferns production titled Dhovo Kavlo (White Crow).

Mascarenhas has been an established professional actor since 1983. Over the course of his career spanning almost four decades, he has appeared in approximately 450 dramatic productions directed by several popular figures in the field, including Rosario Rodrigues, Patrick Dourado, Mario Menezes, John D' Silva, Roseferns, Tony Dias, among others. In addition to his work on the domestic stage, Mascarenhas has also toured internationally, bringing his talents to audiences in countries such as Germany, the United Kingdom, France, Canada, Australia, the United States, and various other locations. His international touring has allowed him to participate in dramatic performances in cities like Sydney, Melbourne, Perth, New York City, Los Angeles, San Francisco, and Houston, among others.

Mascarenhas's contributions extend beyond his acting work, as he has authored and overseen the creation of his theatrical works. Some of his self-authored and directed works include Soglle Roste Ugte (All the Roads Open), Tujim Paulam (Your Footsteps), Maink Lagon (Because of Mother), Daddy Hi Tuji Sun (Dad, this is your Daughter-in-law), Atanchim Bhurgim (Children Nowadays), Grandpa, Xezari Put (Neighbour Son), Mai Paichem Besanv (Parents' Blessings), among others. His 2024 production, Kazaracho Chuddo (Marriage Bangles), is set to make its debut performance in the United Kingdom.

Mascarenhas has maintained an output of theatrical productions over the course of his career. In December 2016, he staged his eighth tiatr, titled Maim Paichem Besanv. This work explored the critical role that parental blessings play in shaping the lives of children, examining the notion that while parents may commit errors, the significance of their blessings should not be underestimated in light of these mistakes. Early in his directorial career, Mascarenhas would typically produce one tiatr per year. However, he has since expanded his annual output, and now stages two tiatr productions - one during the winter season and another during the Easter season. To support this increased production schedule, he has assembled a troupe of artists who collaborate with him in his performances throughout the year. This allows him to maintain a stable ensemble of actors and crew for his tiatr presentations.

== Personal life ==
Mascarenhas is married, and he has three children: two daughters and a son. His daughter Semica is also a fellow Konkani comedian and a former teacher who taught for three years, from 2018 to 2020, at Cambridge School in Goa.

As of 2018, Mascarenhas resides in the neighborhood of Batti, São José de Areal, his father's hometown. Mascarenhas affirms that he is a full-time tiatrist, sustaining himself and his family entirely by producing and performing in tiatrs. He has encountered some criticism regarding the use of vulgar language in his comedic performances.
