= Sylvester Vaz =

Worship singer and actor (born 1968)

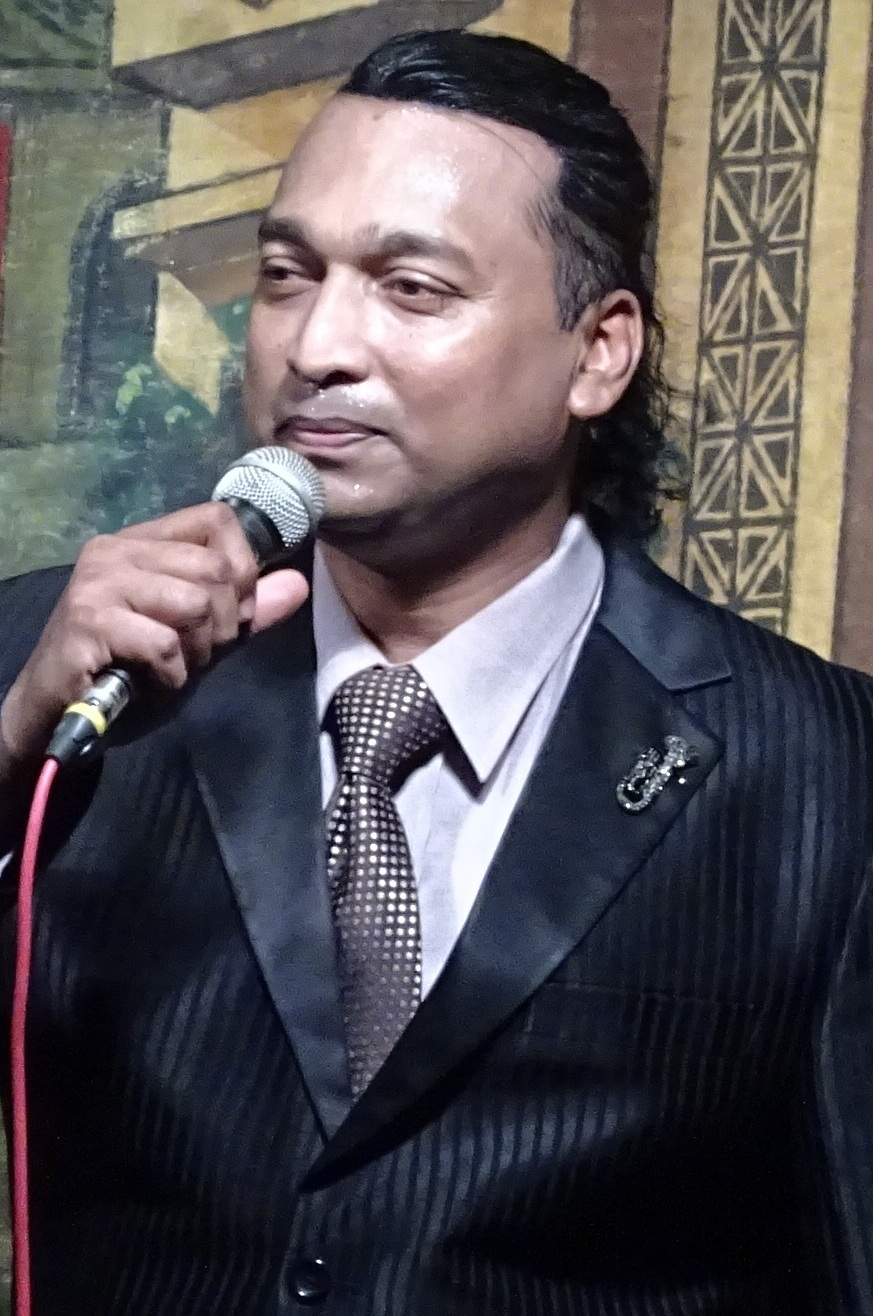
- Vaz in the tiatr Question Mark, 2016
- Born: Sylvester Inacio Vaz; 1 February 1968 (age 58); Margao, Goa, India
- Education: Bachelor of Laws
- Occupations: Worship singer; actor; composer; director
- Years active: 1990s–2019 (theatre)
- Movement: Catholic Charismatic Renewal (CCR)
- Spouse: Irene Vaz (m. 1995)
- Awards: KA's "Best Actor Award and Best Singer Award"
- Website: facebook.com/sylvester.vaz.3

Sylvester Inacio Vaz (born 1 February 1968) is a contemporary worship music singer, former actor, composer, director, and emcee based in London, UK. He is known for his work in Konkani films and tiatr productions.

== Early life ==
Vaz's father, a figure in the local music scene, acted as the choirmaster (mistri) at Our Lady of Grace Church, Margao and served as a music teacher at Music Circle located in Margao. This familial environment fostered Vaz's early interest in the arts, leading him to actively participate in theatrical productions and variety programs at Holy Spirit Church, Margao. He was a regular member of the church choir, often assuming a leadership role. Vaz's musical abilities extended beyond vocal performance, as he was also skilled in playing the guitar and keyboard.

Vaz's early life demonstrated an interest in both academic pursuits and artistic expression. In the inaugural year of his legal studies (LL.B), he was recognized with an award for his active engagement in cultural activities at Goa University. His admiration for the Indian actor Amitabh Bachchan, stemming from his childhood, was rooted in Bachchan's acting abilities. This passion for cinema led Vaz to prioritize attending a film shoot for Bachchan's 1989 Hindi film Main Azaad Hoon in Margao, even foregoing his studies on the eve of his Higher Secondary Certificate (HSSC) exams.

== Career ==
Vaz's foray into the world of tiatr began with performances in church programs. His abilities were acknowledged by Alex Rangel, who extended an invitation for him to take part in the theatrical production titled Koslo Faido (What's The Benefit?). Vaz's involvement in this production encompassed acting, songwriting, and script revisions. His performance in Koslo Faido drew the attention of Michael Gracias, a figure in the Kala Academy tiatr competitions and a member of the Kala Niketan group, Utorda. Vaz's debut at the Kala Academy competition resulted in a merit certificate, this designated him as a frequent contributor to the events hosted by Kala Niketan. His repertoire with the group included tiatrs such as Vallti, Vaddol (Storm), Shanti Melltoli (You'll Attain Peace), Onupkarponnachem Vojem (Burden of Ungratefulness), Bodmas Zalem, and Moronn (Death).

Vaz's professional theatrical career commenced with his role in Mario de Vasco's tiatr Dhump. De Vasco, recognizing Vaz's talent from his performances at Kala Academy competitions, offered him the part. This production marked a significant turning point in Vaz's life, as it not only introduced him to the professional stage but also brought him into contact with Irene Cardozo, whom he would later marry. Following his debut, Vaz collaborated with several popular figures in the Konkani tiatr scene, including Fr. Nevel Gracias, Fr. Planton Faria, Rosario Rodrigues, Tony Dias, among others. His artistic range extended beyond tiatr, encompassing roles in Konkani films. He further demonstrated his versatility through the direction of theatrical and musical performances, in addition to coordinating several cultural initiatives in Goa that featured presentations in both Konkani and English languages. Vaz's contributions to the performing arts also included serving as a compere for a variety of events, including gala shows, weddings, parties, and dances.

Vaz's theatrical career spanned a wide geographic range, encompassing performances across India and the Middle East. He has staged productions in Goa, Mumbai, Mangalore, Bangalore, Ratnagiri, Malwan, Udupi, Karwar, Ahmedabad, Delhi, among other, and internationally in Dubai, Abu Dhabi, Muscat, Qatar, Bahrain, and Kuwait. During his time in Kuwait, Vaz played an influential role in the Catholic Charismatic Renewal (CCR), a movement within Christianity that emphasizes personal experiences of faith and the work of the Holy Spirit. He was also a member of the Holy Family Co-Cathedral choir, contributing his vocal talents during the 8:00 am mass every Friday. Beyond his theatrical work, Vaz has also demonstrated musical talents. In 2000, he showcased his talents at the Konkani Film Festival and was involved in Annie, a professional English musical production, by Fr. Valmiki Dias. This production toured throughout Goa and Mumbai, showcasing Vaz alongside Konkani stage artists including M. Boyer, Ophelia Cabral, Robin Vaz, Rita Rose, Rosario Rodrigues, among others.

Vaz's theatrical career spanned several decades, marked by his participation in a diverse array of productions. He gained experience through collaborations with various theatre companies, including Vell'lekar Nirmiti (Velim Productions), where he performed in several plays under the direction of Fr. Nevel Gracias. These productions encompassed a range of themes and styles, including Amche Ghorabhe Kosbeleat?, Nach Gho Sundorea!, Amcho Bharat Mahaan!, Mhaka Tan Laglea, Tuji Xokti Dhi, Dev Kalizant Asa, Mhojea Mogant Ravat, and Khursachem Zoit, among others." Vaz's repertoire further expanded to include performances in plays directed by Fr. Planton Faria, such as Goycho Saib and Kantteamcho Mukhutt, among others. He also contributed to the Konkani theatre scene through collaborations with figures like Rosario Rodrigues, participating in productions like Hanv Kaliokhant Sandllim and Soglech Kantte Nhuim, etc. Vaz's involvement in the tiatr genre extended to performances in Comedian Domnic's Tum Pasun. In Suseg and Sorg by Comedian Agostinho, the latter Vaz served as a co-director. He performed in several other works, among them: Mog Korat by Ali, Tujem Nanv Vhodd Zaum directed by Jose Rod, Kelear Chuk Kabar Sukh by M. Boyer, Thi Mhoji Maim (Part I) and Thi Mhoji Maim (Part II) directed by Tony Dias. He also graced the stage in Jr. Nelson's Ghorkar and other tiatrs.

== Personal life ==
Vaz married Irene Cardozo. At the time of his marriage, Vaz had established himself as a businessman, and his wife was also involved in business. Irene hailed from Chinchinim. She was a fellow Konkani actress and singer. Together, the couple has a son, Jeremiah (born 1998), who was previously involved in the Konkani stage as a singer and is now active in contemporary worship music. Vaz is a devout Catholic.

In 2002, Vaz moved to Kuwait to participate in a tiatr, a form of musical theater, specifically in Simon Gonsalves' production titled Tujea Kallzak Vinchar. Following this engagement, he was offered a job in Kuwait, allowing him to extend his stay. Throughout his time there, he actively engaged in performing in various tiatrs. Additionally, he became a catechist at the Holy Family Cathedral, Kuwait in 2006. Vaz was actively involved in choral music, holding the position of choirmaster at the cathedral where he oversaw three distinct choirs. He provided education to young children, instructing them in music as well as catechism. His family contributed to his musical endeavors, with his wife participating in the choir and their son, Jeremiah, accompanying the performances on the keyboard. Vaz moved back to his hometown in Margao, Goa, in the early 2010s, before settling in London, UK, in the late 2010s.
