= Santiago Pereira =

Goan playwright and stage director (1912–1960)

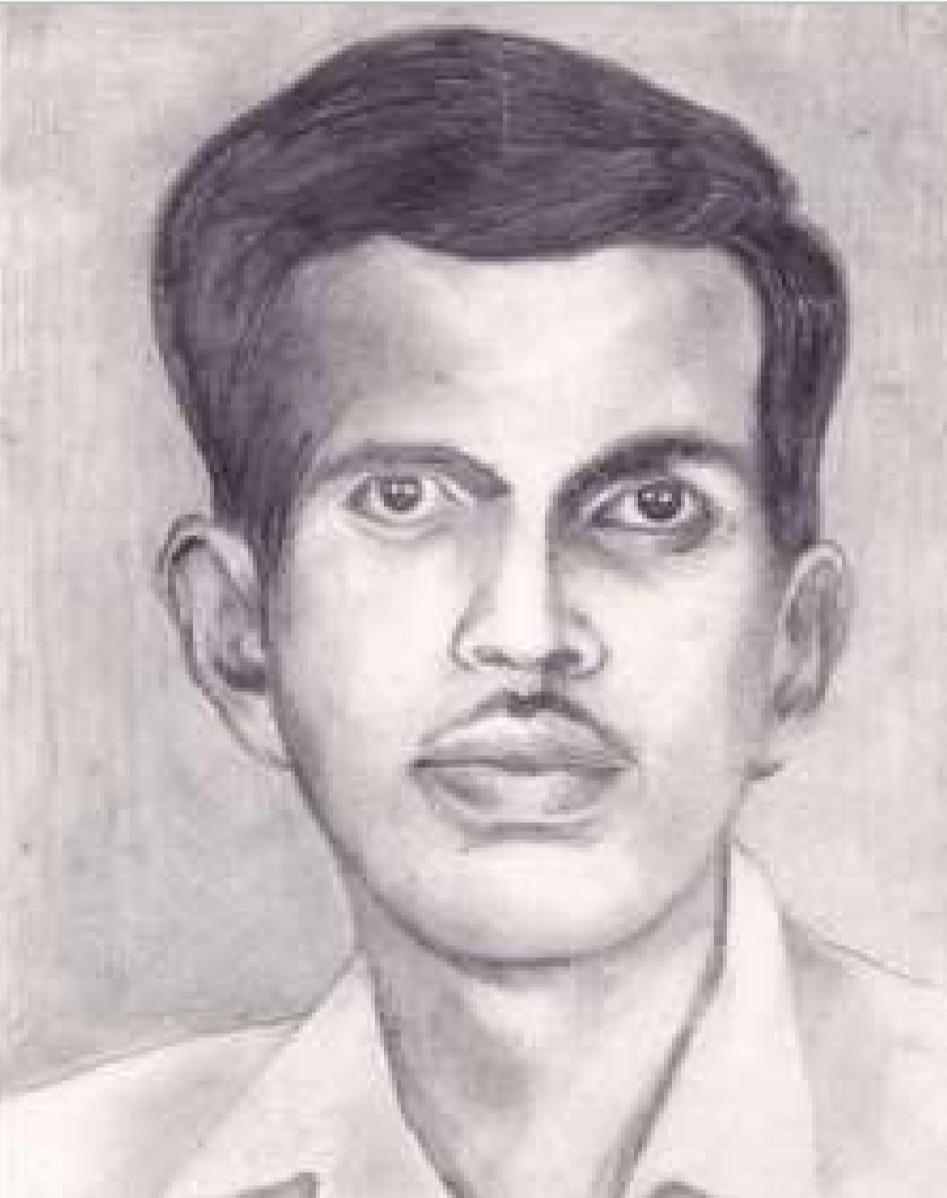
- Portrait of Pereira during his youth
- Born: 22 May 1912; Cotombi, Goa, Portuguese India
- Died: 2 February 1960 (aged 47); Escola Médica Cirúrgica de Goa, Portuguese India
- Occupations: Playwright; director; lyricist; drama teacher; musician
- Years active: 1929–1960
- Spouse: Antonia Moraes
- Children: 2
- Relatives: Antonette de Calangute (daughter-in-law)

Santiago Pereira (22 May 1912 – 2 February 1960) was a Goan playwright, stage director, lyricist, drama teacher, and musician known for his work in khell (street play) productions.

== Early life ==
Santiago Pereira was born on 22 May 1912 in the village of Cotombi, Goa which was part of the Portuguese colonial territory of Portuguese India at the time during Portuguese Empire (now in India). Pereira's father, Vitorino Pereira, worked as a toddy tapper, while his mother was Fortuliana Nogueira. Pereira received his early education at the Paroda government school, where he completed the primeiro grau (first grade) curriculum taught in the Portuguese language.

Pereira later transferred to the Chandor parochial school, where he received training in Western classical music through participation in the church choir. He demonstrated talent and versatility, becoming proficient in playing the violin, saxophone, clarinet, double bass, and trumpet. Initially, Pereira focused his musical efforts on mastering the saxophone and joined the then-popular band led by mestri Domingo. Concurrently, Pereira continued the family tradition of toddy tapping. Upon the death of his father, Pereira undertook the role of financially supporting his mother and two sisters.

== Career ==
The khell, or street play, was a popular traditional performing art form in the then-Portuguese colony of Goa during the early-to-mid 20th century. One of the known figures in this tradition was Pereira, who rose to prominence as a khellam-mestri, or street play teacher, between 1929 and 1960. Pereira's involvement in the khell tradition was shaped by his admiration for the performances of Khadda Minguel, another practitioner of the art form. In 1929, when he was just 17 years old, Pereira formed a group of street play actors known as khellgodde. He gathered performers from his hometown of Cottombi and the neighboring village of Assolda to join his troupe. Following this, Pereira showcased his inaugural khell performance, comprising three playlets known as partio, to the residents of his village. His premiere khell presentation garnered positive feedback, particularly applauding his adeptness in creating the ambiance, narrative, musical compositions, and accompanying music.

Pereira's initial success opened doors for him to present his khell performances in several villages across the region, including Assolda, Cuppamoddi (Curchorem), Chandor, Curtorim, Davorlim, Cuncolim, Macazana, Shiroda, Goa, and Panchawadi, among several others. What distinguished Pereira as a khellam-mestri was his mastery of storytelling, dialogue, and music. His khell productions gained renown for their engaging plots, clever dialogues, satirical verses, and emotive musical components. He had an edge over his peers in khell performances due to his capability to compose original partio (playlets) and his proficiency in notating the musical scores of cantos or verses using the solfeggio system, acquired through formal training in music notation. Through his innovative approach and performances, Pereira left a mark on the khell tradition.

The khell tradition has long been an integral part of Carnaval celebrations in the coastal state of Goa. In the early 20th century, Pereira played a significant role in cultivating and disseminating these khell performances. Influenced by the artistic style of Khadda Minguel, a figure in khell performance, the young Pereira embarked on teaching boys from his village the khell tradition during the Carnival festivities, when he was 17 years old. His direction and compositions for these khell productions were acclaimed by the community, leading to increasing demand for his involvement across the region, including his home village. Over the course of his career, Pereira was invited to form and lead khell troupes in several Goan villages, including Curtorim, Panchawadi, Verna, Goa, Chinchinim, Benaulim, and Utorda. As the "mestri" or director of these khell groups, he oversaw all aspects of the productions, from scriptwriting and musical composition to the training of the khellghodde performers.

Pereira was compensated at a rate of ₹20 (equivalent to ₹4,500 or US$46 in 2023) to ₹25 (equivalent to ₹5,600 or US$58 in 2023) for every three-part (partio) performance he conducted in his role as a khell mestri. In addition to his own troupe leadership, Pereira also encouraged and mentored other aspiring khellgodde to participate in the zomnivoile khell (street play) tradition. Khell troupes, in an era characterized by limited transportation, would journey on foot from one village to another, signaling their forthcoming performances through the beats of dhol-tassa drums and resonant cornets. Local audiences would often join the procession, eagerly anticipating the upcoming khell show. Through his leadership, Pereira played a pivotal role in sustaining and propagating the khell performance tradition as an integral part of Goan Carnaval celebrations in the early 20th century. Pereira frequently engaged in khella-parti (khell acts), where he would combine playing the saxophone with acting in parti (playlets). On occasions when he solely concentrated on the playlet, a lone musician, typically a trumpeter, would accompany him.

Pereira was regarded as a versatile figure known for his diverse talents and contributions to the khell tiatr domain. During the historical period of Portuguese Goa, there were restrictions placed on the content of public performances, with censorship prohibiting the depiction of anything deemed vulgar or the inclusion of criticism directed towards the Portuguese government. During a show in the town of Chandor, Pereira and his troupe faced legal repercussions leading to their arrest and subsequent imprisonment due to the content of their introductory song. The song contained phrases such as "Gõycho Patranv Saib Sant Francis Xavier" and "Gõy Amchem Indiechem Ek Sobhit Thik", which translated to praising St. Francis Xavier as Goa's patron saint and portraying the colony of Goa, as a gem of India. Pereira was a playwright, authoring several khells (theatrical plays). Some of his popular works included Seinicher Petrol, Ek Hokol Chear Noure (One Bride, Four Grooms), Salorechen Pil, Afrikar, Pettientlo Bhattkar, and Kunvrichem Moronn, among others. Pereira made history as the pioneer khellam-mestri (street play teacher) to have his khell production, titled Swami (Ascetic), broadcast on the Emissora de Goa radio station in 1957.

== Personal life ==
Pereira was known for his nonconformist nature, expressing his personal beliefs through his theatrical works known as khell productions. He faced imprisonment by the Portuguese government for showcasing his admiration for St. Francis Xavier and his strong devotion to his state. Pereira was married to Antonia Moraes, and his sons, Benicio (born 1943) and Bonifacio "Bonny" (born 1954), continued his legacy in the Konkani tiatr scene. Bonny's wife, Antonette de Calangute, also contributed to the Konkani stage as a theatre actress and singer.

== Illness and death ==
In 1959, Pereira's health began to decline, leading to illness that necessitated a bladder operation at the Tata Memorial Hospital in Bombay. This medical intervention subsequently rendered him unable to carry on with his previous occupation of toddy tapping. As a result, he transitioned to playing the bass for the band led by João Francisco Pacheco. Pereira's medical issues persisted, and in January 1960 his condition worsened significantly. He was transferred to the Escola Médica Cirúrgica de Goa in Pangim, where he died on 2 February 1960, aged 47. Following his wishes, Pereira was laid to rest in his hometown of Cotombi. During that period, the area did not have bridges linking Chandor-Cottombi to Paroda-Cotombi, necessitating the use of a "tar" (small boat) to traverse the river. Despite these logistical challenges, a large crowd assembled to honor Pereira and offer their final tributes.
