= Francis Tembo =

Indian stage actor and composer (1933–2003)

- Fernandes in his later years
- Born: Francisco Boavida Fernandes; 1 February 1933; Benaulim, Goa, Portuguese India
- Died: 1 May 2003 (aged 70); Benaulim, Goa, India
- Other names: Francis Thembe; Thembo
- Occupations: Actor; composer
- Spouse: Severina Fernandes (m. 1961)
- Children: 6, including Comedienne Joana

Francisco Boavida Fernandes (1 February 1933 – 1 May 2003), known professionally as Francis Tembo, was an Indian stage actor and composer known for his work in zomnivoilo fell (folk drama) and khell tiatr productions.

== Early life ==
Francisco Boavida Fernandes was born on 1 February 1933 in Benaulim, Goa, which was under Portuguese rule at the time during the Portuguese Empire. He was born into a Goan Catholic family. His father, Mariano Piedade Fernandes, worked as a piano and violin repairman and carpenter, while his mother, Maria Acençaõ Serolina Rodrigues (later known as Serolina Rodrigues), was a homemaker.

== Career ==
Tembo, a stage-name adopted by Fernandes, became well known for his prowess in the traditional game known as "thembiamni" or Cup-and-ball. Thembiamni involved the use of a wooden stick resembling a hockey stick and a wooden ball. Fernandes displayed skill in both crafting the ball and stick himself, reflecting his talent as a carpenter specializing in the creation of elaborate wooden artifacts and footwear. Fernandes garnered recognition and popularity within the zomnivoilo fell (folk drama) and khell-tiatr communities. Known for his versatility, he assumed diverse roles ranging from a bhattkar (landlord) and a Hindu man to a drunkard and a comedic character. He collaborated regularly with Konkani khell tiatr figures such as A. Moraes, a mestri (teacher), as well as Konkani playwright and theater director Patrick Dourado, Xallibai, Menino Alfonso, and later playwright Menino de Bandar. Beyond his accomplishments as a stage actor, Fernandes took on the responsibility of instructing aspiring performers in the art of fells (term used for khells in Salcete) from villages and towns such as Curtorim, Chandor, Cuncolim, and Chinchinim. Moreover, he showcased his musical talent by composing songs for his children to perform on stage and at various events. Fernandes earned distinction as a popular specialist in khell tiatr.

Fernandes gained acclaim as a stage performer and songwriter, leaving an impact on the Konkani theatrical scene. His artistic prowess extended to composing several songs that were used by his son, Peter de Benaulim. Beyond his musical contributions, Fernandes played a pivotal role in guiding his son through the challenges of stage fright, instilling confidence and dispelling fear. Acting as both mentor and teacher, Fernandes imparted his knowledge exclusively to his son, who made his debut at the age of four when a fellow child artist failed to appear. Known for his exacting standards and demanding nature, Fernandes granted his son the opportunity to debut in Xallibai's Modkeak Lagon (Because of Matka), a play staged in Benaulim. The success of Peter's inaugural performance left both Fernandes and onlookers astonished. Demonstrating his commitment to nurturing talent within his family, Fernandes also introduced his daughter, Comedienne Joana, to the Konkani stage between the ages of five and seven in his one his zomnivhele khell tiatr production. Fernandes was as a member of the khellghodde (khell actors) group, known for their substantial impact on fell and khell tiatrs. He was noted for his regular participation in khells.

== Personal life ==
Fernandes was a carpenter by profession, he was known for his craftsmanship in creating elaborate wooden artifacts and footwear. In addition to his professional pursuits, he possessed a passion for a traditional game known as thembiamni, akin to Cup-and-ball, in which he achieved a level of expertise. His gaming skills earned him the moniker "Thembo" or "Tembo," eventually incorporated into his stage name. Fernandes's residence served as a venue for khell practices, during which his children received instruction in the chants and verses associated with the performances. Through these sessions, he actively contributed to the preservation and transmission of cultural heritage to the younger generation.

On 24 July 1961, Fernandes married Severina Piedade Fernandes, a homemaker, in a ceremony held at the Benaulim church. Prior to the church wedding, the couple underwent a civil marriage registration in Margão. Together they had six children: Peter de Benaulim, Maria, Comedienne Joana, Maggie, Lonita, and Convy, all of whom pursued careers as tiatr and khell-tiatr artists. Fernandes and his five daughters performed together in Menino de Bandar's productions, including Laitanam Dhorlo, Uban Dilem, and Eka Disa. This artistic legacy continued through the involvement of his grandchildren, Comedian Bryan and Benzer.

On 1 May 2003, Fernandes died at the age of 70, within the confines of his residence in Mazilvaddo, Benaulim, Goa.

== Legacy ==
In June 2023, Fernandes received a tribute from Konkani singer Maythan in an opening song performed by Maythan and composed by Fernandes's son Peter de Benaulim during the tiatr production of Fernandes's grandson, Comedian Bryan's Mhoji Khori Maim (My Real Mother).
