= Khadda Minguel =

Indian playwright and composer (1889–1964)

- Born: Minguel Fernandes; 29 September 1889; Chinchinim, Goa, Portuguese India
- Died: c.1964 (aged 74–75); Chinchinim, Goa, India
- Other name: Kudd'ddo Minguel
- Occupations: Playwright; mestri; composer; singer
- Works: Estrella

Minguel Fernandes (29 September 1889 – c. 1964), known professionally as Khadda Minguel (transl. Bearded Minguel), was an Indian playwright, composer, and singer known for his work in khell productions.

== Career ==
Fernandes, also known as Kudd'ddo Minguel (Blind Mingel), was a figure in the realm of khells, a form of street theater, and held the title of "Khellancho Raza" (King of Khells). Known as a mestri, Fernandes showcased prowess as a playwright, composer, and singer. His compositions, encompassing both lyrics and melodies, were hailed for their artistic merit.

Among his achievements was the creation of the fell (or khell) production titled Estrella, featuring cantos (songs). Fernandes exhibited skill in crafting the lyrics and melodies that graced these cantos, exemplifying his creative abilities. Despite his limited formal education and absence of professional music training, he displayed a talent for self-taught mastery of the violin and clarinet. While earning a livelihood as a toddy tapper, Fernandes composed songs during his ascents and descents of coconut trees. His original compositions, characterized by their ingenuity, were memorized and imparted to his khellgodde (khell actors). His contributions played a pivotal role in proliferating the reach and influence of khells, traditional folk dramas, throughout the state of Goa. Fernandes was recognized as a devout proponent and practitioner of the art form of khells. In the 2018 publication Konkani Khell Tiatr, writer and historian Wilson Mazarello commends Fernandes as one of the popular khell xikoupis (khell teachers) or mestris.

Fernandes served as a khellam mestri for a span of 30 years. Throughout his career, Fernandes crafted several zomnivoile fell or partio (Acts), with a particular emphasis on addressing pertinent social issues of the time. Often found engrossed in his creative process, he would pen these plays while seated in his bolcao (porch). Fernandes's influence extended beyond the realm of writing, as he dedicated himself to training aspiring youth from various localities, including Velim, Durga (Chinchinim), Benaulim, Varca, Carmona, Cuncolim, Assolna, Mobor, and Goa Velha.

Leaving the comfort of his home in Durga, Chinchinim, he embarked on arduous journeys, spanning several weeks, to impart his knowledge and showcase zomnivoile khells through such performances. In return for his work, Fernandes received hospitality, as his fervent admirers and well-wishers delighted in treating him to meals and ensuring his relaxation. The impact of Fernandes's work resonated within the Goan theater community, inspiring a young playwright named Santiago Pereira from Cottombi, Quepem. Pereira, at the age of 17, heeded the call to train village boys in khells for the Carnival in Goa, spurred by the creative spirit kindled by Fernandes.

In the twilight years of his life, Fernandes faced the loss of his eyesight. Nevertheless, this setback failed to deter his attachment for performance. Despite his condition, he continued to entertain audiences with his own khells and actively participated in the productions of fellow mestris. During this period, he came to be known as Kudd'ddo Minguel. Acknowledging his significant contributions, the 2018 publication Konkani Khell Tiatr by writer and historian Wilson Mazarello, featured a comprehensive list of popular khellam mestri of bygone eras. Among the mentioned names, Fernandes secured a place. The term "khellam mestri" denoted the artists involved in teaching and staging khells.

== Legacy ==
In observance of the accomplishments and legacies of deceased tiatr artistes who were born in September, the Tiatr Academy of Goa has consistently organized special programs to honor their contributions to the development of tiatr, encompassing its music, songs, and overall artistic landscape. Events were held on 27 September 2012, at Ravindra Bhavan in Margao, 5 September 2013, at the Black Box of Ravindra Bhavan in Margao, 24 September 2018, at the Conference Hall of Tiatr Academy in Panaji, and 30 September 2019, at the Black Box of Ravindra Bhavan in Margao. During these commemorative occasions, the Tiatr Academy of Goa paid tribute to a select group of individuals among whom Fernandes consistently featured.

Alongside Fernandes, other artists such as Prem Kumar, Philomena Braz, Remmie Colaço, Seby Coutinho, Peter D'Costa, Rosalia Rodrigues, Star of Arossim, Inacio Rosario Luis (Jal), and Arnaldo Da Costa were also remembered for their significant contributions to tiatr. The events provided a platform to acknowledge and highlight the artistic achievements of these individuals, thereby preserving their artistic legacy within the tiatr community and beyond. By organizing these special programs, the Tiatr Academy of Goa not only paid homage to the artistes but also ensured that their contributions and artistic endeavors continued to be recognized and appreciated by the tiatr community and the wider public.

== Selected stage works ==
| Year | Title | Role | Notes | Ref |
|---|---|---|---|---|
| | Estrella | Writer/composer | | |
