= São José de Areal =

- Town
- Location of São José de Areal in Goa São José de Areal (India)
- Coordinates: 15°15′12″N 74°00′49″E
- Country: India
- State: Goa
- District: South Goa
- Sub-district: Salcete

Population (2001)
  - Total: 8,352
- Time zone: UTC+5:30 (IST)
- Postcode: 403709
- Area code: 0832

São José de Areal is a census town in Salcete, Goa. It is located to the south-east of Margão and falls under Margao metropolitan region in South Goa district.

== Demographics ==
As of the 2001 India census, São José de Areal had a population of 8,352. Males constituted 51% of the population and females 49%. São José de Areal has an average literacy rate of 63%, higher than the national average of 59.5%: male literacy was 68%, and female literacy was 58%. In São José de Areal, 13% of the population was under 6 years of age.
