= Panchawadi =

Coordinates: 15.284°N 74.081°E

Panchawadi is a village in the Ponda taluka (sub-district) of Goa. It is located between Five (Panch) Water Stream Valleys (Wadi) housing Five Hamlets (Wade). The Five Wadis are at 1) Vazangal-Ximer, 2) Miraxiwado-Amblai, 3) Posrebhat-Muxer, 4) Maliatoli-Vizor, 5) Badegal-Mapa. It is bordered between Shiroda in the west, Sanvordem-Curchorem in the east, River Zuari in the South and hills in the north. It is famous for the Moisal Dam.

== Area, population ==
According to the official 2011 Census, Ponchavadi has an area of 1,588.22 hectares (3,924.6 acres), a total of 931 households, a population of 4,295 (comprising 2,140 males and 2,155 females) with an under-six years population of 407 (comprising 232 boys and 175 girls).

It is part of the Siroda Assembly constituency and is located at the extreme southern end of the Ponda taluka.
