= Rosario Rodrigues =

Indian playwright and director (1944–2003)

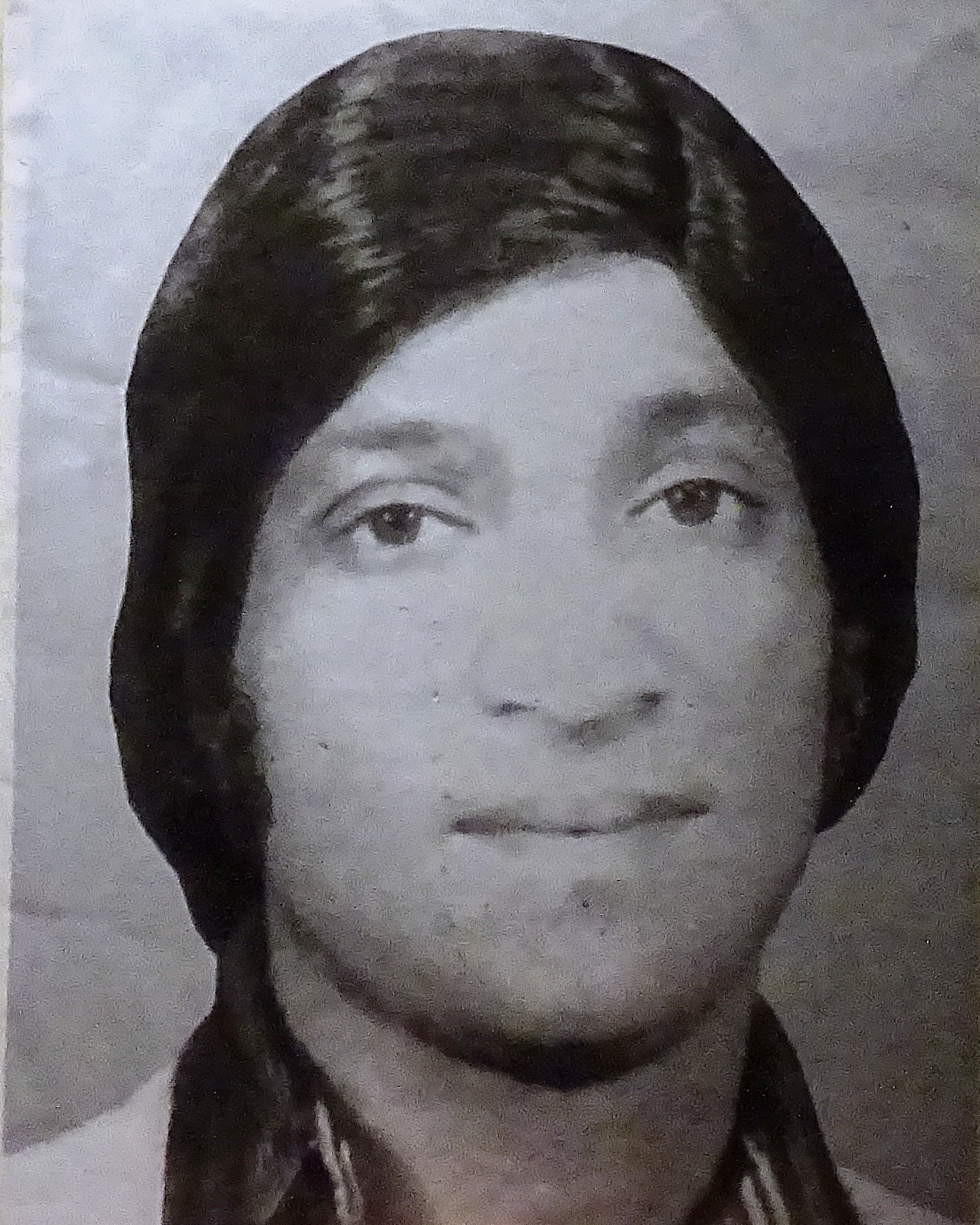
- Rodrigues during his youth
- Born: Rosario Lourenço Santana Rodrigues; 24 October 1944; Benaulim, Goa, Portuguese India, Portuguese Empire
- Died: 5 August 2003 (aged 58); Benaulim, Goa, India
- Other name: Dr. Rosario Rodrigues
- Occupations: Playwright; director; comedian; composer
- Years active: 1970s–1990s
- Known for: Founder of non-stop drama or show format
- Spouse: Carmina Fernandes (m. 1979)
- Children: 1

Rosario Lourenço Santana Rodrigues (24 October 1944 – 5 August 2003) was an Indian playwright, theatre director, comedian, and composer known for his work in khell tiatr productions and non-stop dramas. Referred to as the "Goan Shakespeare" and "Father of khell tiatr", he founded the "non-stop drama" format, alike to one-act play of three hours duration in the 1970s, from the traditional two act plays of khell tiatr. His drama format had its peak period between 1970 and 2000.

== Early life ==
Rosario Lourenço Santana Rodrigues was born on 25 October 1944 in Benaulim, Goa, which was part of Portuguese India during the Portuguese Empire. He was born into a Goan Catholic family, the eldest of four siblings. His parents were Rosario Filipinho Rodrigues, a musician, and Natalia Tereza Furtado, a homemaker. Rodrigues had three sisters - Maria (born 1951), Martinho (born 1954), and Aninha (born 1957) - as well as a younger brother, David (born 1945). During his schooling at Holy Trinity High School in Benaulim, Rodrigues was described as an academically gifted student who demonstrated a strong interest in dramatics. Benaulim was known for its literate and illiterate khell tiatrists, a local cultural tradition. Rodrigues first pursued his education in the Portuguese language before advancing his studies in English. He served as an accountancy instructor at the Carvalho Institute in Margão for an extended period.

In his youth, Rodrigues would stage informal tiatr productions in the chicken coop behind his home after school had ended for the day. For these makeshift performances, he enlisted the assistance of his neighbor Seby Carvalho, a Konkani singer and actor, as well as other local residents. Their roles included tasks such as raising and lowering bed sheets that served as improvised curtains. As Rodrigues' involvement in tiatr deepened, he began teaching a form of street theater known as zomnivhele khell to the youth of Benaulim. These sessions took place at the Holy Trinity chapel in the village.

During the annual chapel feast, Rodrigues would compose original tiatr plays, with the local youth-including future popular tiatrists like Nelson Afonso and A. S. Conception-joining the performance troupe. Rodrigues also played a role in providing performance opportunities and cultivating new talent. When some actors failed to show up for rehearsals, Rodrigues would call upon Seby to step in and learn the lines quickly, allowing him to gain acting experience through these tiatr productions. In this manner, Rodrigues helped lay the groundwork for the tiatr theater tradition that would take root and flourish in Benaulim and across the broader Goan region.

== Career ==
Rodrigues initiated his journey in the performing arts field by creating music and showcasing his performances at community gatherings in nearby villages. He also engaged in scriptwriting for individuals requiring assistance in developing their theatrical works. Over time, he transitioned to composing scripts for street plays known as khells, which were then performed by other individuals. Around 1962, he transitioned to writing and producing a type of short theatrical performance also known as khells. Rodrigues encountered opposition from his father, mestre Filipino Rodrigues, a popular bandleader and clarinet player, due to his engagement in this particular style of theatrical endeavor. Despite this lack of parental support, Rodrigues continued to write and sell individual acts or "one partes" of these khell productions for around ₹10 (equivalent to ₹850 or US$8.90 in 2023) each, making his first sale in 1962. In 1971, he established his own group of performers and staged his inaugural full-length khell theatre performance named Meenakxi Surya. This two-part theatrical work had a total runtime of three hours. Rodrigues also participated in competitive showings of khell tiatr, a related dramatic form. During these contests, two directors would present their khell productions, and the audience would vote by a show of hands to decide the victor. Throughout his career, Rodrigues engaged in competition with popular khell tiatr directors like Antonio Moraes, Vitorino Pereira, Menino Alfonso, and Soccoro de Verna.

In the early 1970s, Goan theater underwent a significant transformation with the emergence of a new dramatic format pioneered by Rodrigues. Dubbed "khell-tiatr," these productions differed from the traditional tiatr by featuring a shorter runtime of approximately 90 minutes. Rodrigues himself was at the forefront of this innovation, writing and directing several popular khell tiatr productions, including Ekech Rati (In One Night) and Ami Fator (We are Stones), in 1972. The success of Rodrigues' khell tiatrs inspired other directors to adopt a similar approach, leading to the proliferation of this format across the Goan theater landscape. Beyond his work in the khell tiatr genre, Rodrigues went on to script and produce a diverse range of 90-minute productions. These included works such as 12 Vorsanni (12 Years), Patang (Kite), Patkin (Sinner), Tem (She), Chedde Cheddvam (Boys and Girls), Ekleanuch Poila (Witnessed by Oneself), Hindustani Cheddvam (Hindustani Girls), and Frank Sinatra, among others, which have become recognized as some of his acclaimed creations. In the year 1976, Rodrigues revolutionized khell tiatr by introducing an element called the non-stop drama. Departing from the conventional tiatr structure of two separate plays, Rodrigues presented a single, full-length production titled Fattim Paulo (I've reached Back) that ran for three hours. This production featured a revolving stage set, special effects, and lighting, marking a significant stylistic departure from the traditional format. Rodrigues' success with the "non-stop drama" inspired other directors to follow suit, contributing to the increasing popularity and recognition of this new theatrical approach. Historically, tiatrs had been primarily enjoyed by the educated elite, while khell tiatrs appealed more to the masses. However, Rodrigues' pioneering work in elevating the status and production values of the non-stop drama helped to bridge this divide, making the format accessible and appealing to a wider range of audiences across different socioeconomic groups in Goa.

Rodrigues frequently collaborated with fellow actor Vithal Fernandes, performing comedy sketches in the production of Fattim Paulo. In this collaborative agreement, Rodrigues and Fernandes agreed to shave their heads. As a result, Rodrigues decided to wear a wig for the duration of his professional career. As a theatre practitioner, Rodrigues introduced several technical innovations to the commercial stage. He substituted the conventional whistle typically employed to indicate the commencement and conclusion of curtain movements with a torchlight. Furthermore, Rodrigues employed an electric bulb to signal musicians to perform the "cantos" (songs). His productions incorporated various stage effects, such as trick scenes, a revolving stage, a folding stage, and disco lighting. Rodrigues was a playwright who authored several well-received non-stop dramas. Some of his acclaimed works include Fattim Paulo, Uzvadd Paloilo (Lights Out), Mhoje Voniecho To, Aum Vatt Chuklom (I've forgotten the way), Anga To Ietolo (Here He'll Come), Bhuk (Hunger), Mhozo Uzvadd (My Light), Mhaka Jieunk Diat (Let Me Eat), Fulam Ani Kolle, Hanvuch To (It Is Me), and Yeunk Nam (Didn't Come), among others. He frequently incorporated popular tiatr artists, such as Betty Naz, Jessie Dias, Antonette Mendes, Fatima D'Souza, Ophelia Cabral, and Bab Peter, into his productions. Rodrigues played a pivotal role in the dissemination of the khell tiatrs and non-stop dramas across Goa and other parts of India, contributing to the popularity and evolution of the tiatr genre.

Rodrigues played a crucial role in elevating the status and popularity of khell tiatrs to be on par with the more established tiatr format. He introduced several innovations to the khell tiatr genre. He was a writer and director, authoring and directing over 75 dramatic works. He staged performances not only throughout the state of Goa, but also in other parts of India such as Bombay, Poona, and the border regions of Karnataka and Maharashtra. Rodrigues even took khell tiatrs to the Gulf countries, expanding the reach of this theatrical form. Rodrigues implemented a unique method by personally transporting his stage settings between various venues to streamline the production of his theatrical works. According to the Konkani historian Wilson Mazarello, "Rodrigues was a reasonably well-educated and intelligent writer" who introduced an innovative concept to the khell tiatr tradition. He observed that the conventional format of two separate plays within a single program placed an unnecessary cognitive burden on the audience, who had to remember two distinct narratives. He proposed a novel solution - the non-stop drama format, which featured a single, continuous narrative. This innovation was a significant contribution that distinguished Rodrigues' work and approach within the khell tiatr tradition.

According to accounts by Mazarello, Rodrigues crafted a khell tiatr named Meenaxi with a distinctive format of a single 3-hour play (parti) with an interval, departing from the conventional style of multiple shorter plays. Rodrigues chose to exclude unrelated songs (kantaram) within the performance, apart from an opening song. The play featured 14-15 cantos (musical sequences) that were integral to the performance. Rodrigues integrated the traditional tiatr elements and advancements attributed to Antonio Moraes into the khell tiatr format, a novel approach that garnered acclaim from audiences, especially in South Goa. Building on this success, he further expanded his repertoire with the play Fattim Paulo, showcasing a cohesive storyline presented in a single 3-hour performance encompassing approximately 15 cantos. However, he chose to rebrand the performance, shifting from the term "khell tiatr" to "non-stop drama." This new designation proved equally appealing to audiences, who flocked to the shows in ever-increasing numbers. Rodrigues received acclaim for his talent in engaging audiences with storytelling techniques, dialogues, and the incorporation of "cantos" that enriched the theatrical experience. Both the Meenaxi and Fattim Paulo productions were hailed as unprecedented successes in the evolution of the Goan theatrical landscape.

The "non-stop drama" format emerged as a prominent trend within the Goan theatrical tradition of khell tiatr in the early 21st century. Traditionally, khell tiatr productions had consisted of two separate plays performed in a single performance. However, a shift occurred where many khell tiatr playwrights began to focus on writing continuous, single- play productions that ran for approximately three hours, divided into 14 to 15 distinct acts or "cantos". This new format was pioneered by Rodrigues and soon adopted by a number of other popular Goan khell tiatr writers. These included figures such as Antonio Moraes, Patrick Dourado, Succur Piedae Fernandes, and Vitorino Pereira, as well as emerging playwrights like Ligorio Fernandes, Minino de Bandar, R. Moraes, A. M. Pacheco, Rosario Dias, Christopher Leitao, and Pascoal Rodrigues. These writers came to view the non-stop drama format as the future direction for the khell tiatr genre. Rodrigues himself became particularly prolific in crafting these extended, single-play productions, which were often praised for their high-quality scripts. Several of Rodrigues' non-stop dramas, including titles such as Meenaxi, Fattim Paulo, Uzvadd Paloulo, Ekech Ratri, Hanga tho Etolo, Mhaka Jieunk Dieat, Patkin, Ghara Ea, Mhojem Kitem Kortat and Thank you Doctor, proved to be popular successes with Goan theater audiences.

== Personal life ==
Details about Rodrigues's personal life outside of his professional activities are limited. However, records indicate that on 29 May 1979, he married Carmina Fernandes at the Igreja de São João Baptist church, now known as St. John the Baptist Church, in the Goan town of Benaulim. Their civil marriage had been registered six days earlier in Margão, also in Goa. At the time of his marriage, Rodrigues was not only involved in Konkani theatre productions, but also worked as a businessman. Together, Rodrigues and his wife Carmina had one child, a son named Floyd (born 1980). Carmina herself was a stage actor and composer who had been active in the early 1970s. She had made her debut in two khell tiatr productions directed by Rodrigues - Ekech Ratri and Ami Fator. It is likely that the couple met through their shared involvement in Goa's theatrical scene during this period. After marrying Rodrigues, Carmina largely withdrew from her performance career, though she occasionally continued to participate in productions.

Rodrigues exerted influence over his contemporaries and amateur artists involved in this dramatic tradition. One of his most prominent protégés was the Konkani singer Antonio Vital Furtado. Furtado was regarded as a devoted follower and long-standing collaborator of Rodrigues, having participated in 57 of the latter's tiatr productions since the 1970s. Another Konkani comedian, known by the stage name "Comedian Jesus" (Jose Antao), also identified Rodrigues as his preferred tiatr playwright. Insights into Rodrigues's scriptwriting process have been provided by J. P. Pereira of The Navhind Times. Pereira reported that Rodrigues would routinely consult with fellow writer Tertuliano "Tedol" Fernandes to develop the narratives and plots for his khell tiatr works. On 5 August 2003, Rodrigues, aged 58, died at his residence in Mazilvaddo, Benaulim.
