= Quepem taluka =

Quepem Konkani: Kepe Portuguese: Quepém
- Taluka
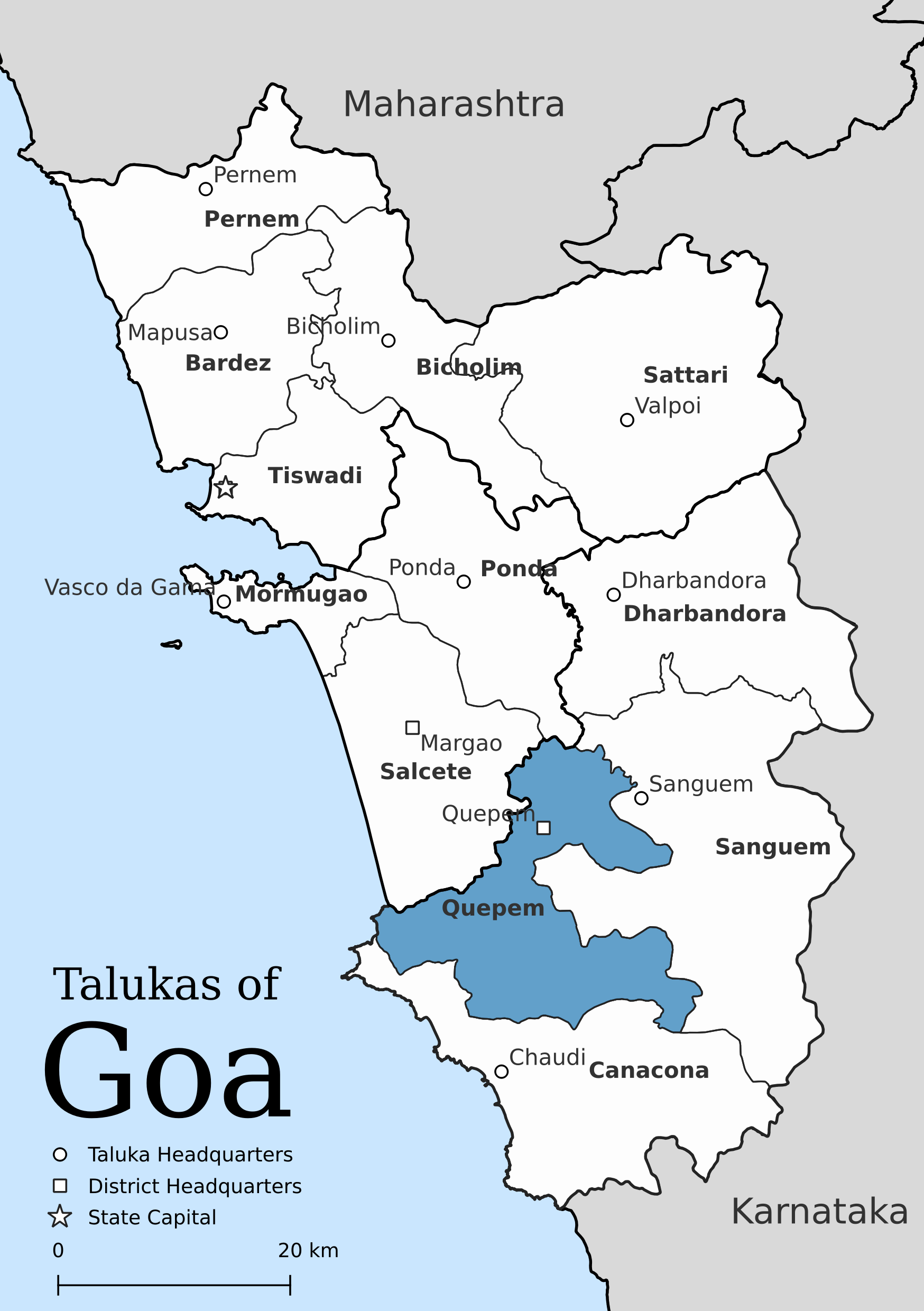
- Location of Quepem in Kushavati district in Goa
- Coordinates: 15.212450°N 74.07323°E
- Country: India
- State: Goa
- District: Kushavati district
- Named after: Kushavati river
- Headquarters: Quepem
- Settlements (as of 2011): 2 Cities; 1 Town; 35 Villages

Government
  - Tehsildar: Rohit Kadam
  - Lok Sabha constituency: na
  - Assembly constituency: na
  - MLA: na

Population (2011)
  - Taluka: 81,193
  - Urban: 55.37%

Demographics
  - Literacy rate: na
  - Sex ratio: na
- PIN: 4037XX
- Vehicle registration: GA-09
- Rain: na

Quepem is a taluka of Kushavati district in the state of Goa, India. It lies in close proximity to Margao Metropolitan area.

== Demographics ==
At the time of the 2011 Census of India, Quepem had a population of 81,193 with sex ratio of 994 females to 1,000 males. Quepem taluka has an average literacy rate of 82.93%, higher than the national average of 74.04%: male literacy is 87.5% and female literacy is 78.35%. Scheduled Castes and Scheduled Tribes make up 1.15% and 31.15% of the population, respectively. 55.37% of the population lives in urban areas.

=== Religion ===
Religion in Quepem Taluka (2011)
Religion	Percent
Hinduism	63.78%
Christianity	29.45%
Islam	6.53%
Other or not stated	0.24%

Hinduism is followed by the majority of population of Quepem taluka. Christians form a significant minority. At the time of the 2011 Census of India 63.78% of the population of the taluka followed Hinduism, 29.45% Christianity, 6.53% Islam and 0.24% of the population followed other religions or did not state their religious affiliation.

=== Languages ===
Konkani is the most commonly spoken language in Quepem taluka.

Languages of Quepem Taluka (2011)
1. Konkani (75.6%)
2. Marathi (8.25%)
3. Hindi (6.06%)
4. Kannada (4.13%)
5. Urdu (2.00%)
6. Others (3.93%)

At the time of 2011 Census of India, 75.63% of the population of Quepem taluka spoke Konkani, 8.25% Marathi, 6.06% Hindi, 4.13% Kannada and 2.00% Urdu as their first language.

== Settlements ==
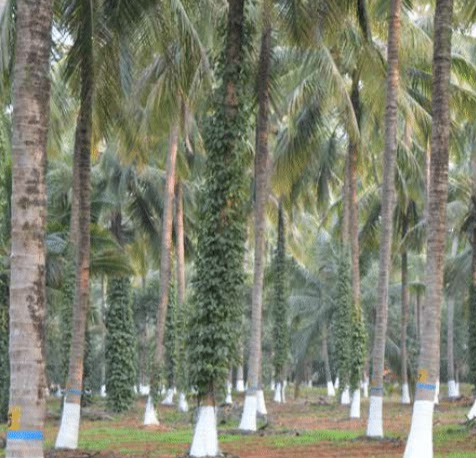
‘Bhattlem’ (Coconut-palm grovet), a common sight throughout the taluka

=== Cities ===
Quepem has 2 cities: Curchorem, Quepem

=== Towns ===
Quepem has 1 town: Xeldem

=== Villages ===
Quepem has 35 villages: Adnem, Ambaulim, Assolda, Avedem, Bali, Barcem, Bendordem, Cavorem, Cazur, Chaifi, Cordem, Corla, Cotombi, Fatorpa, Gocoldem, Maina, Mangal, Molcarnem, Molcopona, Morpila, Nagvem, Naquerim, Odar, Padi, Pirla, Quedem, Quisconda, Quitol, Sirvoi, Sulcorna, Tiloi, Undorna, Xelvona, Xic-Xelvona, Zanodem

== See also ==
- Goa
- Konkani people
- History of Goa
- Salcette
- Bardez
