= Carnival in Goa =

Festival in Goa, India

Goan Carnaval
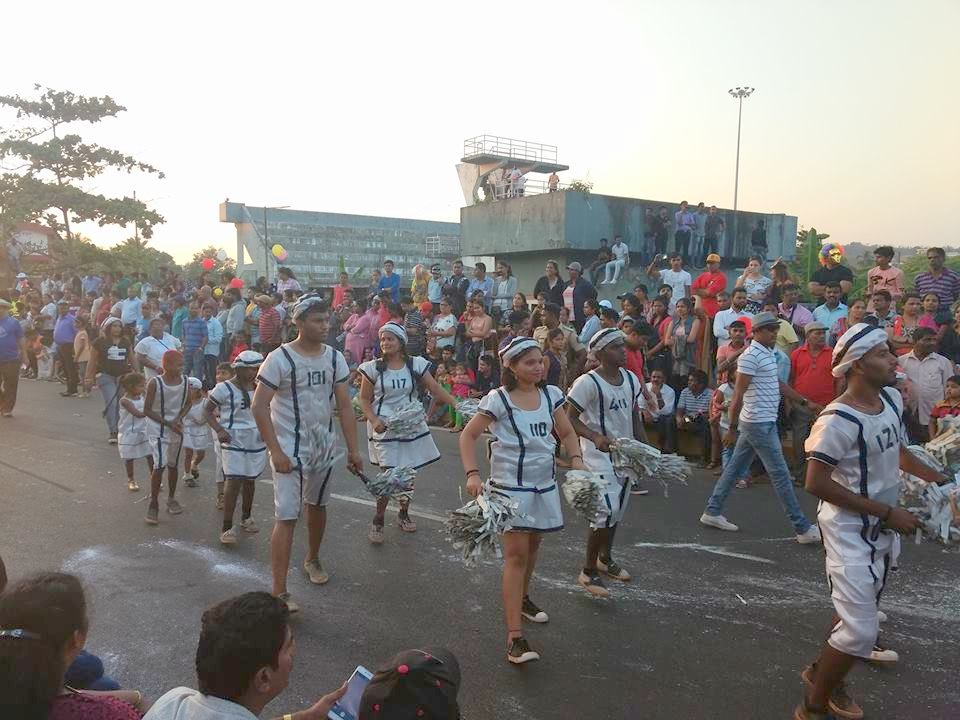
- From Top left to right: City decorated for Carnaval, People dancing on streets, Floats during Carnaval
- Also called: Carnaval, Carnival
- Observed by: Goans, Goan diaspora
- Type: Cultural
- Significance: Celebration prior to fasting season of Lent
- Begins: February
- 2025 date: Afternoon, March 1 – midday, March 4
- 2026 date: Afternoon, February 14 – midday, February 17
- 2027 date: Afternoon, February 6 – midday, February 9
- 2028 date: Afternoon, February 26 – midday, February 29
- Duration: 3 days
- Frequency: Annual

Carnival in Goa, also called Carnaval, Intruz, Entrado, or (colloquially) Viva Carnival refers to the festival of carnival, in state of Goa, India. Though significantly smaller than the well-known Rio Carnival or the Portuguese Carnival of Madeira, the Goa Carnival is the largest in India and one of the few traditional celebrations of the Western Christian holiday in Asia. The current version of the Goa Carnival was modelled after the Rio Carnival by a local Goan musician named Timoteo Fernandes and imposed in 1965 to attract tourists. It has since turned into a major tourist attraction for the small state.

== Origin ==
While the roots of the Carnival in Goa date back to the introduction of Roman Catholic traditions during the Portuguese conquest of Goa, being celebrated since the eighteenth century, the festival itself fell into obscurity during the later days of colonialism, as Portugal's authoritarian regime known and is celebrated on the same day as Portugal Estado Novo limited freedom of assembly and press.

After the end of Portuguese rule, the Brazilian version of the festival was imposed by Timoteo Fernandes in 1965, a Goan musician who modeled it after the famed Rio Carnival. This was done to attract more tourism. Today, the urban parade includes floats from local villages, commercial entities, and cultural groups. It is still organised in a very traditional manner, including by the staging of streetside local plays called Khell tiatrs, in various villages, especially in the taluka of Salcete. Live bands play traditional Konkani, Latin, and EDM music throughout the festivities. Streets become open dance floors, where locals and visitors groove to the beat of lively tunes. The traditional mask dances and performances by local artists also add to the celebration. Beyond the parades, street performances, including acrobatics and fire-breathing shows are also held. According to the Government of Goa's Department of Tourism, the carnival is "Goa's most famous festival and has been celebrated since the 18th century."

The Carnival usually starts off on Fat Saturday (known as Sabado Gordo) and concludes on Fat Tuesday (known as Shrove Tuesday), just before Ash Wednesday and the first day of the Western Christian season of Lent, observed by Christians of the Roman Catholic, Lutheran and Anglican denominations, among others. In Panjim, the capital of Goa, the festival is complemented by Grape Escapade, a local wine festival, and a dance at Samba Square in the centrally located Garden of Garcia da Orta.

According to local tradition, during Carnival Goa is taken over by King Momo, usually a local resident who presides over the festival during the four-day span. King Momo traditionally proclaims the Konkani message (English: "Eat, drink and make merry"). In 2021, the King Momo for the Goa Carnival was Sixtus Eric Dias from Candolim.

== Parade ==
The parade usually begins on Fat Saturday evening with a procession headed by King Momo. Balloons, horse-drawn carriages, decorated bullock carts and elaborate floats are the highlights of the parade. The festivities during Goa Carnival include dancing troupes, revelers wearing masks and costumes, live music, sports competitions, floats and parades, and food and drinking.

=== Dates and location ===
In 2024, the festival was celebrated from 10 February – 13 February. In the urban areas, individual float parades were held in the Goan cities and towns of Panjim, Margao, Vasco and Mapusa. In 2026, the carnival was held from 13 February - 17 February across Goa in Porvorim, Panjim, Margao, Vasco and Mapusa.

== See also ==
- Culture of Goa
- Portuguese Goa
