= Patrick Dourado =

Indian playwright (1939–2026)

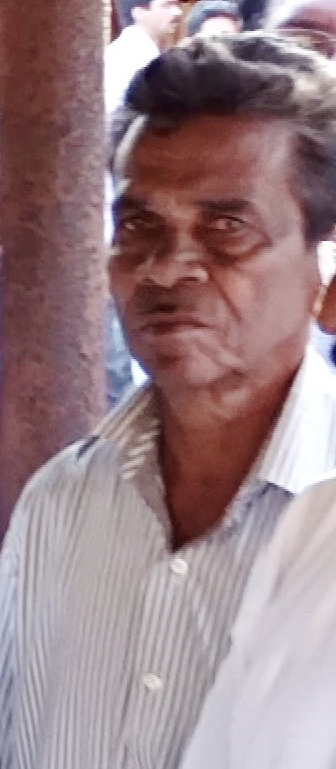
- Dourado in 2015
- Born: Patrocicio Dourado; 23 June 1939; Curchorem, Goa, Portuguese India
- Died: 8 May 2026 (aged 86)
- Other name: Patrocinio Dourado
- Occupations: Playwright; director; singer; composer; ghostwriter
- Years active: 1957–2026

Patrocicio "Patrick" Dourado (23 June 1939 – 8 May 2026) was an Indian playwright, theatre director, singer, composer and ghostwriter known for his work in Konkani films and tiatr (theatre) productions. In a career span of more than six decades, he had written scripts for more than 100 tiatrs, starting in 1957 at the age of 18.

== Early life ==
Dourado, being the eldest of his three siblings, hailed from a financially disadvantaged background.

Following the loss of her husband, Dourado's widowed mother took on the role of a domestic worker, earning 12 annas or 75 paise (equivalent to ₹93 or 97¢ US in 2023) in her efforts to provide for and raise their three children.

== Career ==
Dourado embarked on his journey in Konkani theatre at the age of approximately 18, when he successfully produced his inaugural play, Nagounnechi Girestkai. With the support of his local acquaintances, the play was staged during the chapel feast at Pedda-Benaulim on 12 October 1957. The cast members included Xavie (Bhatagoto), Jack Mendes, Santan Fernandes, and Francis Koloi. While Dourado had completed the script for the play, he encountered challenges in composing the accompanying cantos or songs due to his limited knowledge in musical composition. In search of guidance, Dourado approached a fellow villager named Caetano Piedade Fernandes, who possessed a wealth of experience in songwriting. Fernandes agreed to assist Dourado but not before imparting a lengthy lecture to him.

He made his debut in the realm of tiatrs, receiving commendation from the audience for his maiden production. This initial success served as a catalyst for his subsequent endeavors in tiatr writing. Demonstrating his creative prowess, Dourado authored an additional series of six tiatrs, namely Vodilunchem Utor (Elder's Word), Zolmachem Ghor (Birth House), Caitan Amcho Xezari (Caitan, Our Neighbour), Lembddo Bhatkar, and Aplam ani Chaplam. As of 2011, his prolific contributions to the genre encompassed a catalog of over 100 khell-tiatrs, including works such as Ghatki Bhoinn (Traitor Sister), Ostori (Woman), and Mira. Dourado's artistic explorations extended beyond conventional norms, as evidenced by his ventures into experimental terrain on the tiatr stage. Notably, he undertook the scripting and direction of two productions exclusively featuring female performers-namely, Doyall Kallzacho (Kind Hearted) and Oxem Ghoddtta.

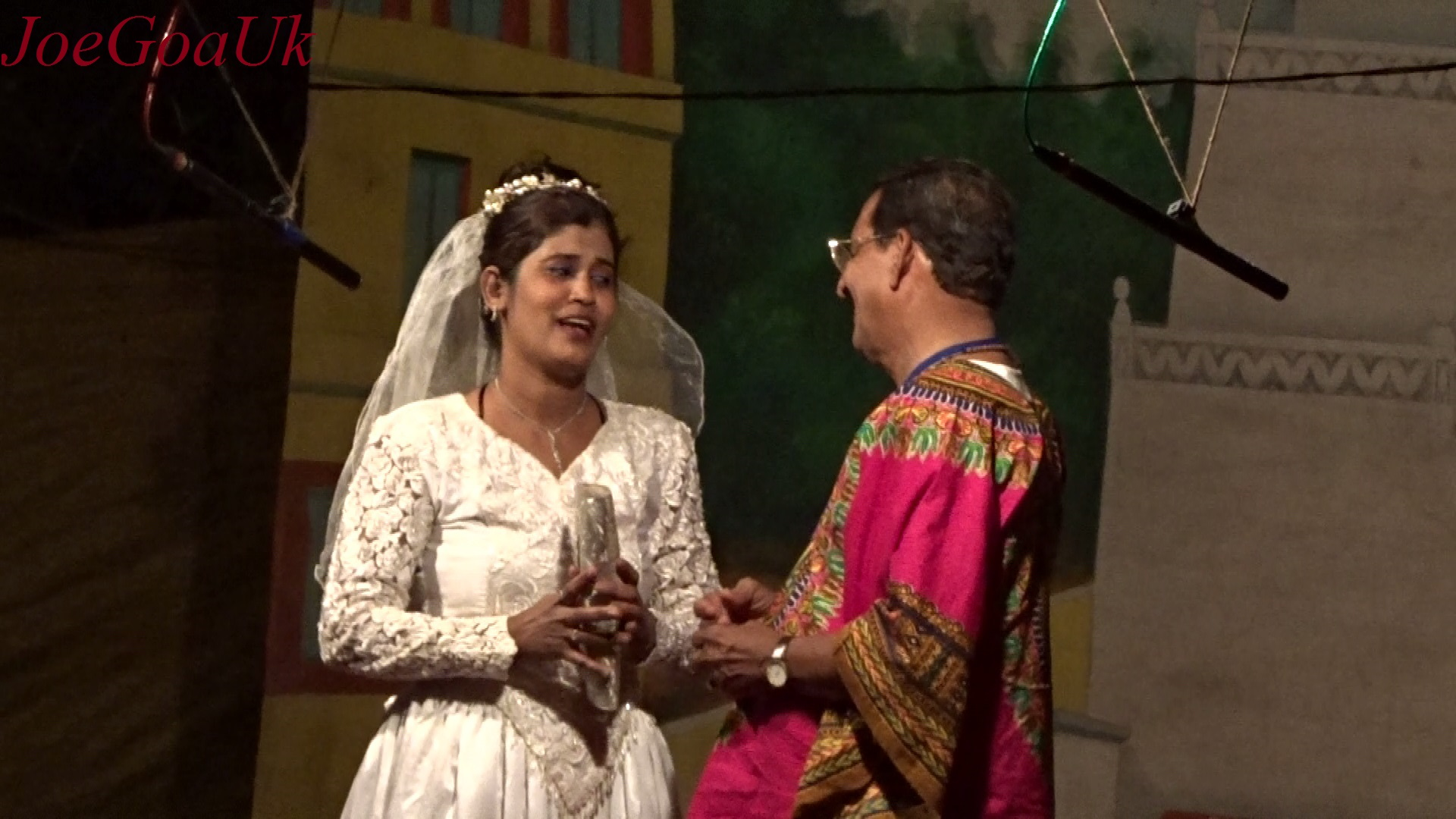
Carnival khell by Dourado staged at Cortalim Thana-Sancoale Junction

In the earlier years of Konkani play scripting, the storylines were often transcribed in 32-page notebooks, eventually transitioning to larger registers in subsequent times. Notably, there was no formalized script for dialogue during this period; rather, emphasis was placed solely on composing songs that narrated the unfolding narrative. Dourado received valuable tutelage on song composition from his maternal uncle, Antonio Colaco of Bansi ward, who directed zomnivhele khells (Goan folk plays) in Cacora-Sanvordem. Building upon his initial play, Dourado composed additional songs and sought a final evaluation from Francis Koloi, whose satisfaction with the composition affirmed Dourado's abilities and encouraged him to forge ahead without hesitation. In a June 2016 interview with The Times of India, Dourado acknowledged the assistance rendered by C P Bebo in his songwriting endeavors.

Dourado gained recognition in the field of scripting folk plays and continuous dramas. His skills as a composer on the Konkani stage, particularly in creating heartfelt songs and captivating cantos, have earned him reputation. In addition, he has served as a ghost composer for numerous audio albums, composing lyrics for hundreds of songs and collaborating with various singers. Dourado's talents extend beyond music composition, as he has written numerous tiatrs (theatrical plays) and has also worked as a ghostwriter for well-known directors.

Due to the nature of his shows being staged on a contractual basis by professional contractors, Dourado has faced financial constraints and has not been able to derive significant financial benefits. Consequently, he has relied on collaborations with producers and contractors, as he lacked the means to book halls and stage his shows in towns. Dourado himself acknowledges that organizing shows on a contractual basis does not yield substantial financial returns. Known for his storytelling abilities, as described by Daniel F de Souza of The Goan Everyday, Dourado emphasizes the importance of patience in writing tiatrs. He draws inspiration from accomplished playwrights of the past, such as M. Boyer, Prem Kumar, and C. Alvares, who would release their tiatrs once every two years, resulting in shows of quality in all aspects.

== Death ==
On 8 May 2026, Dourado died at the age of 86.

== Awards ==
As of 2011, Dourado's contributions have garnered recognition from multiple esteemed cultural and literary associations, including the Government of Goa. In the year 2000, he received a commendation from the Kala Academy Goa. In 2004, he was bestowed with an honor by Kuwait Goans, while in 2008, he was felicitated by the Dalgado Konknni Akademi. Dourado's prowess in the realm of tiatr was acknowledged by the Goa Government in 2008 when he was granted the esteemed State Cultural Award.

== Selected stage works ==
Year	Title	Role	Notes	Ref
1957	Nagounnechi Girestkai	Writer/singer	Debut tiatr	
1980s	Ostori	Director/writer		
2015	Mhozo Sangati Tho	Director		
2019	Hi Tuji Jivitachi Kanni	Director		
