= Benaulim =

- Village
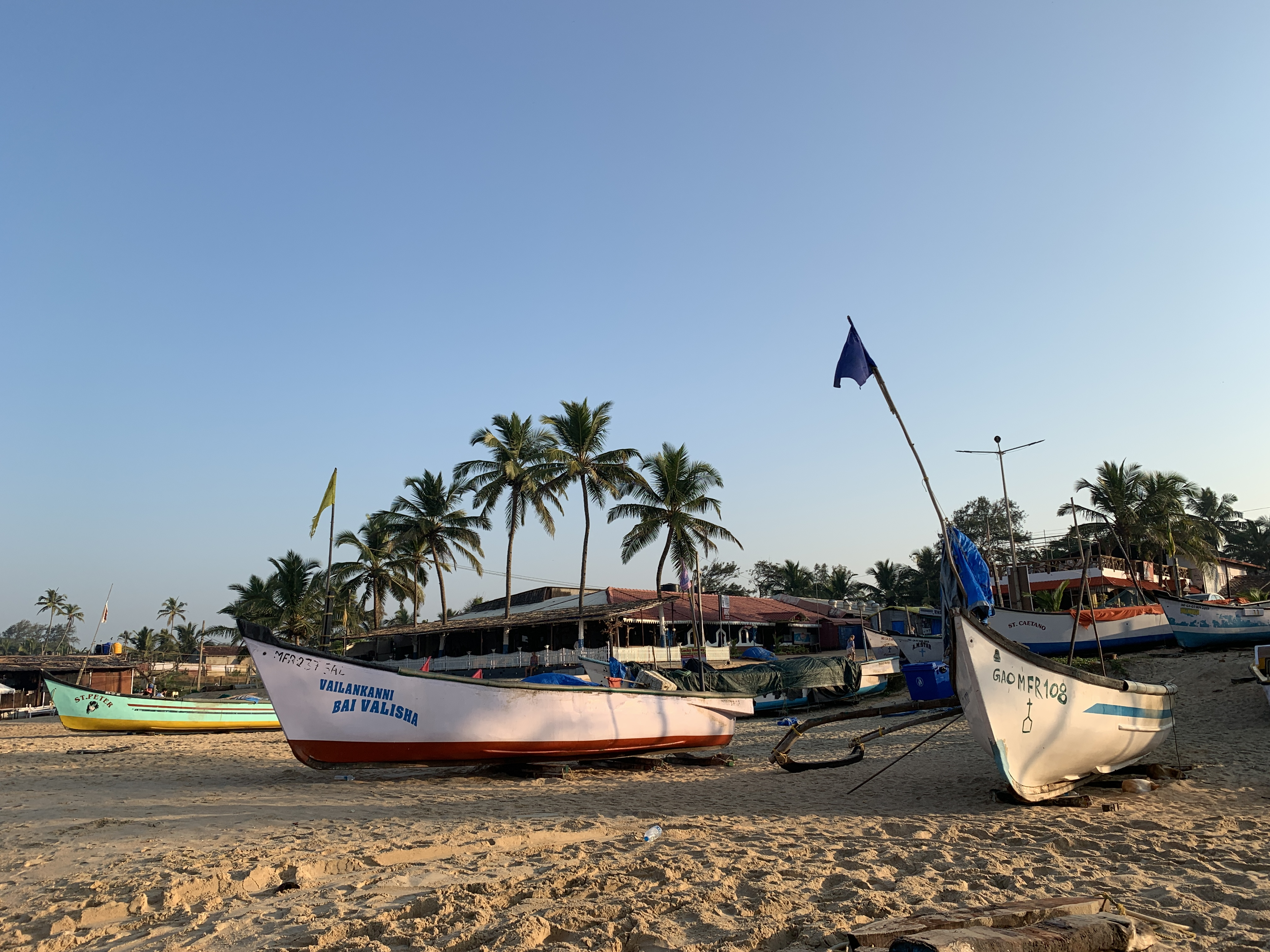
- Benaulim beach
- Etymology: Village of the arrow
- Location within Goa Location within India
- Coordinates: 15.25°N 73.92°E
- Country: India
- State: Goa
- District: South Goa
- Sub-district: Salcete
- Elevation: 1 m (3.3 ft)

Population (2011)
  - Total: 11,919
- Demonym: Bannalemcar

Languages
  - Official: Konkani
- Time zone: UTC+5:30 (IST)
- PIN: 403 716
- Vehicle registration: GA-08

Benaulim (Bannalem) is a village in the state of Goa, India. Located in Salcete taluka of South Goa district, it neighbours Colva village to the north, Margao in the northeast, and Varca village to the south. During Portuguese rule, it was one of the nine communidades in Salcete. Benaulim is the birthplace of St. Joseph Vaz, who was a priest and missionary in Ceylon. Benaulim is home to several traditional carpenters, and has long been known as Goa's 'village of carpenters'.

There are two churches in Benaulim. The Holy Trinity Church in Mazilvaddo is a modern church built over the centuries-old chapel of the Loiola Pereira family. The St John the Baptist Church in the Povacao area, closer to Colva, is where St. Joseph Vaz was baptised. In 2016, Benaulim hosted the 8th BRICS Summit.

== Etymology ==
The village was known as Banahalli or Banawali (the village of the arrow) before the advent of the Portuguese. Ban is the Sanskrit word for 'arrow' and Halli the Kannada word for 'village'. According to the Sahyadrikhanda of the Skanda Purana, Parashurama shot his arrow into the sea and commanded the sea god Varuna recede up to the point where his arrow landed. The arrow is said to have landed at Banahalli. The area was then settled by Goud Saraswat Brahmins from northern India.

== History ==
The tall type coconut cultivar, 'Banawali Green Round', the landrace of Benaulim, was selected and released as 'Pratap' in 1987 for cultivation in coastal Maharashtra by the Konkan Krishi Vidyapeeth, Dapoli owing to its superior morphological and fruiting characteristics and high yielding nature.

== Geography ==
Benaulim is located at 15°16′12″N 73°56′5″E. It has an average elevation of 1 metre (3.3 feet).

== Demographics ==
Religion in Benaulim (2011)
1. Christianity (82.7%)
2. Hinduism (13.1%)
3. Islam (3.90%)
4. Others (0.37%)

Benaulim has population of 11,919 of which 5,818 are males and 6,101 are females, as per Census of India 2011. Child population within the age group of 0-6 is 1,235 which is 10.36% of total population. Female sex ratio is 1,049 against the Goa state average of 973. Moreover, the child sex ratio is around 992 compared to the state average of 942.

Literacy is 89.25% higher than the state average of 88.70%. Male literacy is around 92.15% while female literacy rate is 86.51%. Out of the total population, 4,316 were engaged in work or business activity. Of this 3,087 were males while 1,229 were females.

Benaulim has a predominantly Christian population (82.68%), followed by Hinduism (13.05%) and Islam (3.90%). Schedule Caste (SC) constitutes 0.99% while Schedule Tribe (ST) were 0.26% of total population.

== Tourist attractions ==
Benaulim beach
- Beach
- Interactive map of Benaulim beach

Benaulim has three beaches: The main Benaulim beach is neighboured by Trinity beach to the south and Sernabatim beach to the north. Benaulim beach is popular among the locals and tourists. Apart from sunbathing and swimming, there are also options of parasailing, jet skiing, boat riding and wind surfing. Benaulim beaches are pristine, as they are relatively undeveloped. Due to reduced human movement during the coronavirus lockdown, five adult Olive Ridley turtles washed up on Benaulim beach after decades, in June 2020. The turtles were trapped in fishing nets on the beach and were rescued by Benaulim fisherman Pele and his friends.

Benaulim's main market is located near Maria Hall (which serves as an event hall), a community centre, where most accommodation, restaurants, grocers and chemists are concentrated.

There is one luxury hotel in Benaulim, Taj Exotica Resort & Spa, Goa. There is a hidden side of Benaulim beach entrance behind the resort.

== Government and politics ==
Benaulim is part of Benaulim (Goa Assembly constituency) and South Goa (Lok Sabha constituency).

== Notable people ==
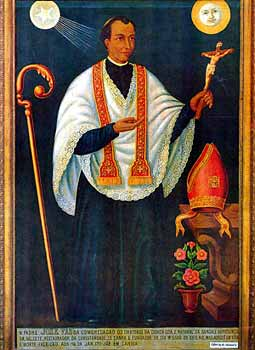
St Joseph Vaz (1651–1711): missionary Catholic priest who worked in Ceylon (modern day Sri Lanka) and Canara (coastal Karnataka).
Prof. Froilano de Mello, MD (1887–1955): Luso-Indian microbiologist, medical scientist, academic, author and an independent MP in the Portuguese Parliament.

== Gallery ==
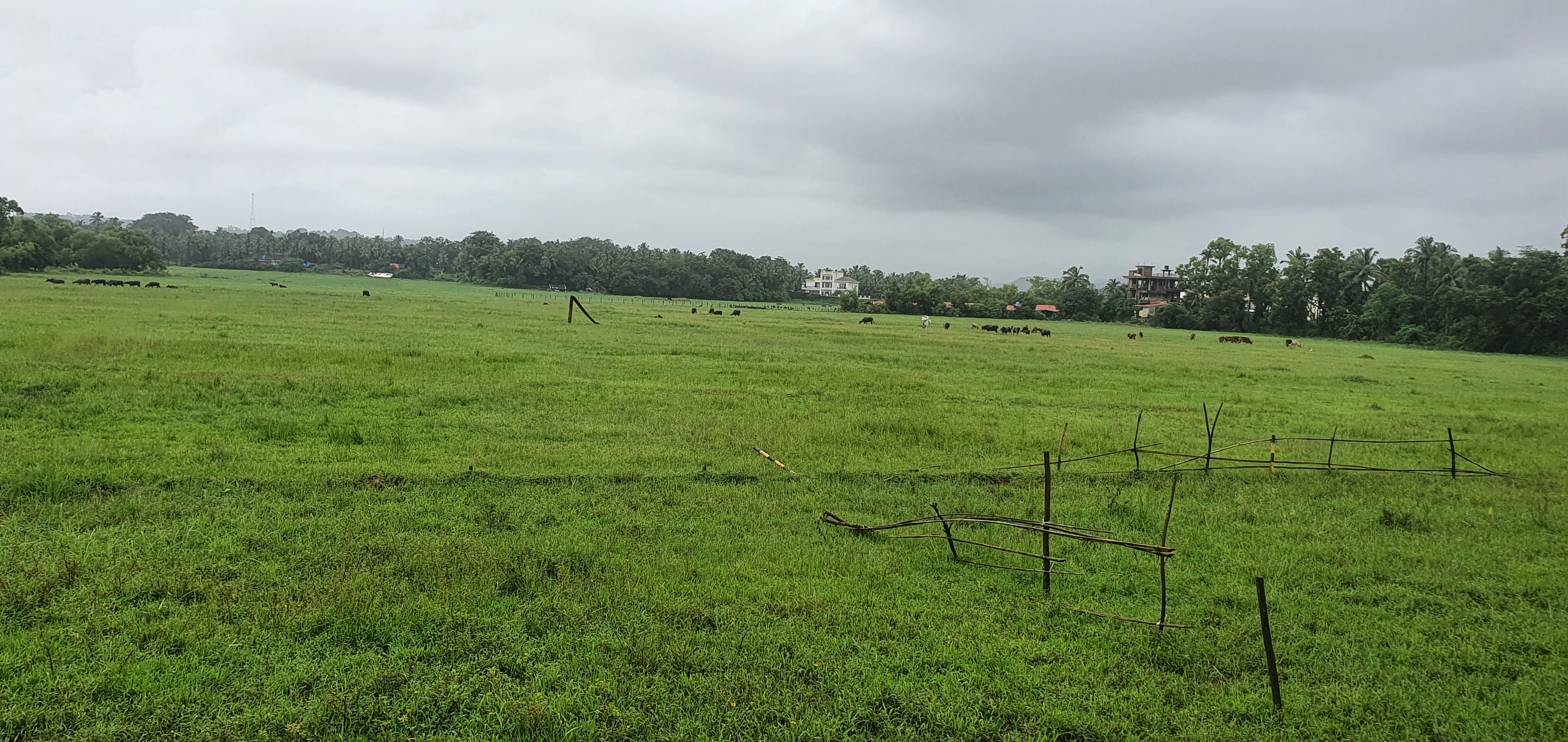
Fields of Benaulim after St. John the Baptist Church East towards Margao

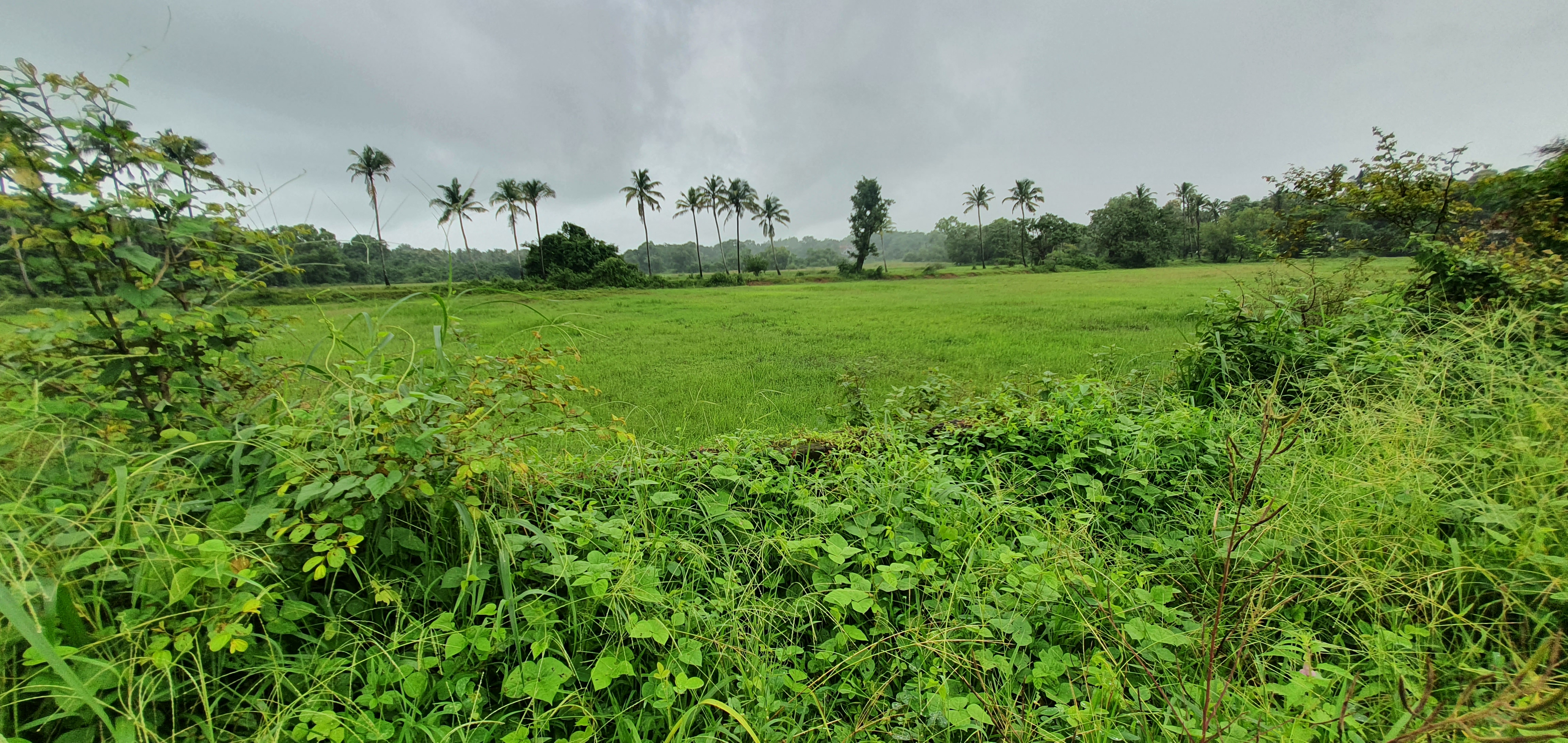
Fields of Benaulim after St. John the Baptist Church West towards the Beach
Images from Benaulim, Goa, India
