= Jack Rebello =

Indian drummer (born 1967)

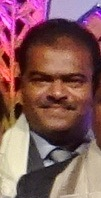
- Rebello in 2017
- Born: Joaquim Lourenço Rebelo; 24 February 1967 (age 59); Benaulim, Goa, India
- Other name: Dotor
- Occupation: Drummer
- Years active: 1983–present
- Father: Mastor
- Relatives: Luis Rebello (brother)
- Musical career
- Origin: Benaulim, South Goa
- Genres: Goan music; indie pop; Indian pop
- Instruments: Drums
- Member of: Eka (as of 2017)
- Formerly of: Luis and his Melodians; Seby and the Wings; Black Slades; Bliss; India
- Website: facebook.com/jack.rebello.94

Joaquim Lourenço "Jack" Rebello (né Rebelo; born 24 February 1967) is an Indian drummer who works on the Konkani stage. The son of musician and pioneer of khell tiatr, Mastor, he began his career around the same time as his younger brother Luis. A leading drummer of Goa, Rebello spent two decades initially playing for Goan cover bands in Delhi.

== Early life ==
Rebello's musical lineage extended further, with his two uncles, Luis Henrique and João Caetano, also being musicians referred to as "mestris." His father's third sibling was employed at the Firestone Tire and Rubber Company in Bombay, rather than pursuing a career in music like the rest of the family. João Rebelo, Rebello's father, was engaged in agriculture and additionally facilitated the setup of tents and parking arrangements for attendees of drama performances. Furthermore, he was involved in musical performances with the band Luis and his Melodians.

Rebello's musical talent was passed down to him by his paternal uncle, Luis Henrique. His upbringing in Benaulim, a hub of musical talent and tiatr artists, influenced his musical journey. From the age of 9, he displayed an interest in music and actively participated in various musical extravaganzas. At the age of 14, while still in the ninth grade, Rebello commenced his drumming career by collaborating with his uncle, Luis. Although initially offered the opportunity to play drums professionally in a tiatr production by M. Boyer in 1982, Rebello chose to prioritize his studies for the S.S.C examination and declined the offer. Nevertheless, he continued to accompany his father and uncle to village performances, where his drumming skills were showcased. As Rebello's career advanced, he became a sought-after drummer for tiatrs, collaborating with directors like the Mendes Brothers and Bab Peter, among others.

== Career ==
Rebello's musical journey commenced as a drummer under the tutelage of his uncle, Luis Henrique. His early experiences included performances with brass bands, village feasts, and village tiatrs. Luis Henrique was recognized for his mastery of the double bass as a member of the popular orchestra, Luis and his Melodians. In 1983, Rebello received an invitation to join Luis and his Melodians, marking a significant milestone in his career. For a duration of five years, he showcased his drumming skills alongside the orchestra. In 1986, Rebello's aspirations led him to venture to Delhi, where he embarked on a new chapter as a member of the popular band, Seby and the Wings, and remained associated with them until the year 1995. Rebello's musical trajectory saw a transformative period unfold when Seby and the Wings commenced their performances at Isfahan, the coffee shop situated within The Taj Palace, New Delhi. This professional engagement at the coffee shop not only provided a platform for Rebello to refine his craft but also played a pivotal role in shaping his future musical endeavors. Throughout the week, the band captivated audiences with their performances, reserving Mondays as their designated day off.

On Mondays, they catered to private functions hosted by influential business magnates, further establishing their reputation. Occasionally, affluent business owners would hire them on Sundays, securing special authorizations from the hotel to engage the band's services. Evidently, Seby and the Wings held considerable popularity during the 1980s. The band, led by the band leader Seby Fernandes as the lead vocalist, boasted a lineup consisting of Mario Sequeira on bass and Peter Alfonso on keyboards. Rebello, despite being a newcomer at the time, swiftly earned a prominent position within the ensemble, showcasing his instrumental prowess. Following a successful eight-year tenure with Seby and the Wings, Rebello sought new musical opportunities and transitioned to the Black Slades, another prominent Goan band captivating audiences in Delhi. Rebello's musical journey exhibited consistency as he continued to grace the Taj Palace coffee shop for two decades, leaving a mark with his drumming prowess and contributing to the band's success.

Upon his return to Goa, Rebello established his own musical ensemble called Bliss, which remained operational for a span of five years before ceasing its activities. He also garnered recognition as a member of several popular Indian bands in Goa's music scene. In 2005, during his residency in Goa, Rebello joined the band India for two seasons, dedicating a year of his tenure to their musical endeavors while concurrently engaging in the tiatrs (traditional Konkani musical theatre) produced by his close associate, Comedian Agostinho. Rebello initially immersed himself in the tiatr milieu in 1983, collaborating with Menino de Bandar and contributing his drumming prowess to the productions of tiatrs such as Deudita (God Gives), the non-stop tiatr Succorina, and Indiechi Maim (Mother India). In 2008, Rebello embarked on a collaboration with Comedian Agostinho, participating in the theatrical productions of Sir, Police - Part I, Police -Part II, Advogad (Advocate), Godfather, and Public. It is worth highlighting that Rebello achieved a distinction by partaking in two tiatrs that successfully completed 200 consecutive shows: Menino de Bandar's Succorina and Comedian Agostinho's Police - Part I. He performed in all 400 shows of these productions, cementing his position as the sole drummer within the tiatr realm to be associated with both these double-centuries. Throughout his career, Rebello has contributed his drumming expertise to over 40 albums, collaborating with tiatrists such as Wilmix-Sharon, Lawry Travasso, Pascoal Rodrigues, Menino de Bandar, Hortencio Pereira, and Justin de Santacruz. Additionally, he has had the privilege of collaborating with music directors including Maestro Josinho, Joaquim D'Souza, Baltazar Fernandes, Agostinho D'Cruz, and Babush Fernandes.

Rebello's return to Goa was prompted by the death of his brother, Luis, in 2015. Since 2017, Rebello has been actively engaged in the music scene, lending his talents to Comedian Agostinho and the Indian Indie pop band known as Eka, based in Delhi. Eka specializes in Hindi pop music and is prominently recognized for their performances at various social gatherings, including weddings and parties in Hyderabad, Ludhiana, Sri Lanka, Dubai, Singapore, and other locations. Their musical repertoire has extended to a broad range of events, such as the four-day conference organized by The South Asia Doctors, which hosted a gathering of 1000 delegates in Singapore. Rebello's musical journey has encompassed collaborations beyond his involvement with Eka. He has had the privilege of sharing the stage with artists like Norman Cardozo during live shows featuring the Goan singer, Lorna Cordeiro. Furthermore, Rebello has made significant contributions to the Konkani music scene by providing instrumental support for various audio albums alongside musicians such as Maestro Josinho, Agnelo Dias, and Joaquim D'Souza.

Within the realm of tiatr, Rebello has established himself as a regular and versatile musician. He has lent his skills to several directors, including M. Boyer, who endearingly referred to him as "Dotor" (transl. Doctor), as well as C. Alvares, Bab Peter, H. Britton, and the Mendes Brothers. His musical abilities have garnered popularity, leading to several engagements and performances. Rebello's proficiency ranges from being a top-tier drummer in dance bands to actively participating in tiatr productions, even taking on the responsibility of managing the ticket counter at Margao's Ravindra Bhavan. During a critical juncture in his career, Rebello confronted a pivotal choice between the realms of popular entertainment and tiatr. Ultimately, he elected to prioritize his involvement in tiatr, recognizing that live performances have become the predominant avenue for musicians to generate income, given the increasing prevalence of drum machines replacing live drummers in studio recordings.

== Personal life ==
Rebello hails from a large family, consisting of eight siblings. Among his brothers are Luis, Eduardo, Flavino, Antonio, Agnelo, and Pascoal, while his sister is named Jesuina. Within the realm of Konkani music, both Luis and Agnelo have gained recognition as musicians. As of 2018, Rebello has established his residence in the Pequeno, Pulvaddo ward in Benaulim, Goa. He remains unmarried as of 2020. On 10 May 2015, Rebello's brother Luis, died at the age of 44, due to cardiac arrest in Raia, Goa. An affiliation exists between Rebello and Comedian Agostinho, a tiatrist, as they have collaborated in more than 200 performances. During his formative years, Rebello found inspiration in Rocky Gomes from Navelim, then-a leading drummer in Goa.

Rebello has expressed his views on singers who critique musicians openly. He admires Lawry Travasso for his skill in smoothly masking errors during performances. Rebello believes that victors of singing contests should engage in the Konkani music community, helping to enrich the "kantaram" performances crucial to the tiatr heritage. Rebello has raised concerns regarding the lack of recognition and respect accorded to musicians in tiatr productions, despite their extended performances lasting three hours in tight spaces. Beyond his musical interests, Rebello also demonstrates a passion for football.
