= Shirsat =

Shirsat is an Indian surname. Notable people with the surname include:

- Sanjay Shirsat, Indian politician
- Sonia Shirsat (born 1980), Indian Fado singer
- Yuvraj Shirsat, Indian Civil Engineer, Maharashtra
