= Luis Rebello =

Indian drummer (1970–2015)

- Rebello in an undated photo released by Tiatr Academy of Goa in 2015
- Born: Luis Henrique Carmo Rebelo; 16 July 1970; Benaulim, Goa, India
- Died: 10 May 2015 (aged 44); Raia, Goa, India
- Occupation: Drummer
- Years active: c. 1984–2015
- Father: Mastor
- Relatives: Jack Rebello (brother)

Luis Henrique Carmo Rebello (né Rebelo; 16 July 1970 – 10 May 2015) was an Indian drummer known for his work in tiatr (theatre) productions. The son of musician and khell tiatr pioneer Mastor, he got his big break at the age of 14 in Konkani playwright Menino de Bandar's tiatr Succorina staged in the 1980s.

== Early life ==
Luis Henrique Carmo Rebello (né Rebelo) was born on 16 July 1970, in the ward of Pequeno, Pulvaddo in Benaulim, Goa. He comes from a family with a musical background, as his father João Santana Rebelo, also known as Mastor (transl. Master), was involved in the khell tiatr circles as a musician, agriculturist, and farmer. Rebello learned drumming at an early age, receiving guidance from his father, who was proficient in drums, as well as double bass and trumpet. He grew up in a large family, having six brothers named Joaquim, Eduardo, Flavino, Antonio, Agnelo, and Pascoal, and a sister named Jesuina. His mother, Faustina Florina Rodrigues, was a homemaker from Orlim, Goa.

== Career ==
Rebello embarked on his professional journey as a drummer, initiating his career through a collaborative effort with his uncle in a brass band. At a young age of 14, he received his first significant opportunity in the realm of music when he stepped in as a substitute drummer for his brother, Jack, who had relocated to Delhi. This debut occurred in the Konkani playwright Menino de Bandar's theatrical production titled Succorina. Rebello's talent quickly captured the attention of various Konkani directors, including Patrick Dourado, Ben Evangelisto, and Prince Jacob, among others, leading to several collaborations. Seeking new horizons, Rebello later ventured to Delhi, where he embarked on a seven-year tenure as a percussionist for the acclaimed band Seby And The Wings. His drumming skills also found expression in his contributions to Indian bands such as Black Slades and Tantriks. However, his heart eventually led him back to his hometown of Goa in 2007, where he dedicated himself to the world of tiatrs, a distinctive form of Goan musical theatre.

Upon returning to Goa, Rebello joined forces with the Konkani actor Prince Jacob's theatrical troupe, making contributions for approximately five years. His drumming prowess resonated not only in live performances but also in the realm of audio cassette recordings, as well as during solemn occasions such as feasts and funerals throughout Goa. In 2011, Rebello further enriched his artistic journey by becoming a member of Comedian Agostinho's theatrical troupe, where his drumming skills embellished their performances until 2015. Known for his commitment, Rebello proved himself as an indispensable troupe member, having served for a six-year tenure. The culmination of Rebello's career took place during his final performance in Comedian Agostinho's tiatr production titled Picnic, held at Bacbhatt, Raia, Goa, on 9 May 2015. Furthermore, Rebello made contributions to the theatrical productions by assisting with ticket sales at the ticket counter in Ravindra Bhavan, Margao, during tiatr shows.

== Personal life ==
Jack and Agnelo Rebello, who are also musicians in the Konkani industry, are siblings of Rebello. On 2 December 2011, their father Mastor died at his residence in Pulvaddo, Benaulim, Goa, at the age of 83. Rebello himself lived in Maddar, Benaulim. He died without having made any formal provisions, such as drafting a will, gifting assets, or expressing any specific last wishes. Subsequently, on 10 August 2020, it was officially recorded that Rebello's mother, Faustina, became the sole beneficiary of his estate, as no other individuals or legal heirs were identified under the prevailing succession laws of the state of Goa.

== Death ==
Rebello, during his association with Comedian Agostinho's dramatic troupe, had concluded his performance at Bacbhatt in Raia, Goa. After the theatrical presentation, he packed his drums and handed them over to the stage manager before leaving the venue for the drama at around 11:15 pm on 9 May. On the morning of 10 May 2015, at around 7 am, Rebello's lifeless body was found next to the roadside in Colleandongor, Raia. Nearby, his scooter, the mode of transport he used, was located a short distance from where he was found. Upon notification, the Maina, Curtorim police promptly arrived at the scene and conducted an inquest panchanama to document witness testimonies. It was during this procedure that the contents of Rebello's purse were meticulously examined, leading to the subsequent identification.

Rebello had encountered two minor strokes earlier, but an extensive examination conducted by law enforcement officials established that his death was primarily due to a significant cardiac arrest that occurred subsequent to his performance at Bacbhatt, Raia. However, the conclusive findings of the postmortem report were still pending at the time of these events. As per official police reports, Rebello's relatives visited the nearby police precinct to provide details about his previous heart ailment. The police ascertained that Rebello's body lay by the roadside, with his scooter positioned nearby. No indications of foul play were observed, thereby dispelling any initial suspicions.

=== Reactions ===
Prince Jacob, the then-president of the Tiatr Academy of Goa, paid tribute to Rebello, acknowledging his contributions to the tiatrist fraternity. In Jacob's view, Rebello's death represented a profound loss, not only as a drummer but also as a humble and dedicated team player. Jr. Nelson, in his appraisal of Rebello, highlighted his musical abilities coupled with a grounded and disciplined demeanor. Nelson noted that Rebello was known for his reserved nature, rarely speaking unless necessary. Ivo Furtado, a drummer from Raia, Goa characterized Rebello as a soft-spoken figure who exuded a brotherly presence. Furtado emphasized Rebello's extensive knowledge and expertise in the field of drumming. Comedian Agostinho fondly remembered Rebello as a man who never voiced complaints or prioritised personal gain. According to Agostinho, Rebello's selflessness was evident in his focus on the collective rather than individual interests.

== Legacy ==
In September 2016, a musical event was organized by the family of Rebello in honor of his birthday. Singers and musicians from the Konkani stage graced the occasion, captivating a substantial audience. Antonette de Maina and Tony de Ribandar presented a birthday song in honor of Rebello, whereas Osvy Viegas and Jr. Reagan paid homage through a musical duet performance. The lineup of performers included Rioma Menezes, Rosy Alvares, Alika Cardozo, Lawry Travasso, Seby Fernandes (known for his work in "Mira Mira"), Marcus Vaz, Xavier Gomes, Comedian Selvy, Osvi Viegas, Jr. Reagan, and Peter-Roshan, who delivered musical renditions. The audience was treated to comedic acts by Janet, Agostinho, Selvy, Bryan, Luis Bachchan, and Ambe. The musical arrangements were provided by an ensemble comprising Joaquim D'Souza, Roy Menezes (saxophone), Theo Alvares, Anthony de Velim (trumpet), James Vaz, Rohan Denis (keyboard), Wilbur Rebello (bass), John Fernandes, and Jack (drums; brother of Rebello). Konkani director Mario Menezes fulfilled the role of hosting duties on the program, and figures such as Damu Naik (Chairperson of Ravindra Bhavan), Maria Rebello (Zilla Parishad member), and Fr. Benjamin (vicar of Seraulim Church) were among the notable attendees.
