= Sadasivan =

Sadasivan is a surname and a given name. Notable people with the name include:

Given name:

- Sadasivan KM Nambisan, aka Sadu, Indi-pop singer, composer, lyricist and producer
- Sadasivan Radhakrishnan PVSM, AVSM, retired officer in the Indian Air Force

Surname:

- Ayiroor Sadasivan (1939–2015), Indian playback singer mainly in Malayalam cinema
- Balaji Sadasivan (1955–2010), Singaporean politician and neurosurgeon
- C. K. Sadasivan (born 1953), Indian politician, former member of the Kerala Legislative Assembly
- Rahul Sadasivan, Indian filmmaker and screenwriter in Malayalam cinema
- S. N. Sadasivan (1926–2006), Indian author
- Toppur Seethapathy Sadasivan (1913–2001), Indian plant pathologist in the University of Madras
- Viswa Sadasivan (born 1959), Nominated Member of Parliament in the Parliament of Singapore
