= Shibani Vaishali Rajapurkar =

Indian artist (born 1959)

Shibani Vaishali Rajapurkar (born 3 November 1959, in Mumbai) is an Indian painter, best known for her watercolour paintings. A graduate of Delhi University, her work has been exhibited at the Darpan Art Gallery, the Tilak Smarak Ranga Mandir, the Bal Gandharva Ranga Mandir and the Nehru Centre, London.
