= Raghuveer Bharam =

Indian painter

Raghuveer Bharam is an Indian painter of oil paintings of portraits, mythological themes, and figurative art. His best known portrait of Vasantrao Deshpande was painted in 1980 from a prior photograph, and subsequently hung at the Vasantrao Deshpande Memorial Hall in Nagpur from 1990, before needing critical restoration from Bharam in 2013. A student of the Gurukul painting method under Gopal Deuskar, his works have been adapted into book covers and exhibited at the Darpan Art Gallery.
