= Sachin Naik =

Indian painter (1978–2018)

Sachin Naik (1978 – 6 December 2018) was an Indian painter and printmaker, best remembered for his watercolour paintings, most notably those of Pune and historic Goa.

== Early life ==
A graduate of the University of Hyderabad and Goa University, his works have been exhibited at the Kala Academy, the Institute Menezes Braganza, the Jehangir Art Gallery, and the Lalit Kala Akademi. He briefly taught watercolor painting at the Savitribai Phule Pune University before his death. A posthumous exhibition of his work was exhibited at the Darpan Art Gallery in 2019. He received the Yuva Srujan Puraskar for fine art in 2017.
