= Devji Shrimali =

Indian painter and mixed media artist

Devji A. Shrimali is an Indian painter and mixed media artist, best known for his water colour and oil paintings, digital art, and pyrography. A graduate of the Maharaja Sayajirao University of Baroda, his works have been exhibited at the Nehru Centre and the Darpan Art Gallery.
