= Paresh Narendra Kamat =

Indian Konkani poet (born 1968)

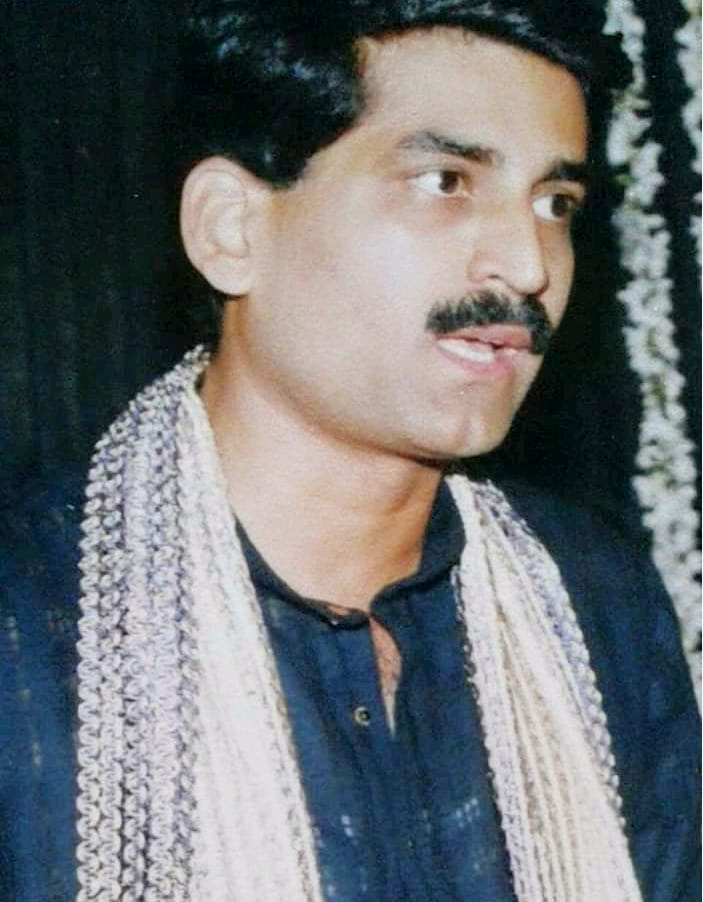
- Kamat in 2004
- Born: 28 March 1968 (age 57) Goa, India
- Language: Konkani
- Period: 2000–present
- Subject: Poem; translation
- Notable awards: Yuva Srujan Puraskar (2011); Sahitya Akademi Award (2018)
- Spouse: Sonali

Paresh Narendra Kamat (born 28 March 1968) is an Indian Konkani poet.

Kamat was born on 28 March 1968. He is a pharmacist and has been writing modern Konkani poetry for thirty years. His sensuous poetry is considered pioneering. He has published five poetry collections including Alang (2000), Garbhakol (2004), Shubhankar (2009), Chitralipi (2013) and Rangboli (2018). His poetry has also been translated in Hindi, Sindhi, Marathi, Gujarati, Punjabi and English languages.

He was awarded the Sahitya Akademi Award in Konkani for Chitralipi in 2018. 'Chitralipi' has been translated into Hindi by Aditya Sinai Bhangui, Assistant Professor, Goa University. It is published by Sahitya Akademi, New Delhi in 2023.

He has also received State Kala Academy’s Sahitya Puraskar (2009) and the Government of Goa's Yuva Srujan Puraskar (2011–12).
