= Darpan Art Gallery =

Art gallery in Pune, India

The Darpan Art Gallery is an art gallery located in Pune, India. Established in 2008 by the Kalachhaya Cultural Centre, it is known for exhibiting art, sculpture, photography, visual arts, and mixed media arts from local artists. It is considered the premiere art gallery for the city of Pune. Artists such as Milind Mulick, Sachin Naik, Raghuveer Bharam, Maniilal Sabarimala, Shibani Vaishali Rajapurkar, and Devji Shrimali have exhibited there.
