= Aarti Nayak =

Indian singer

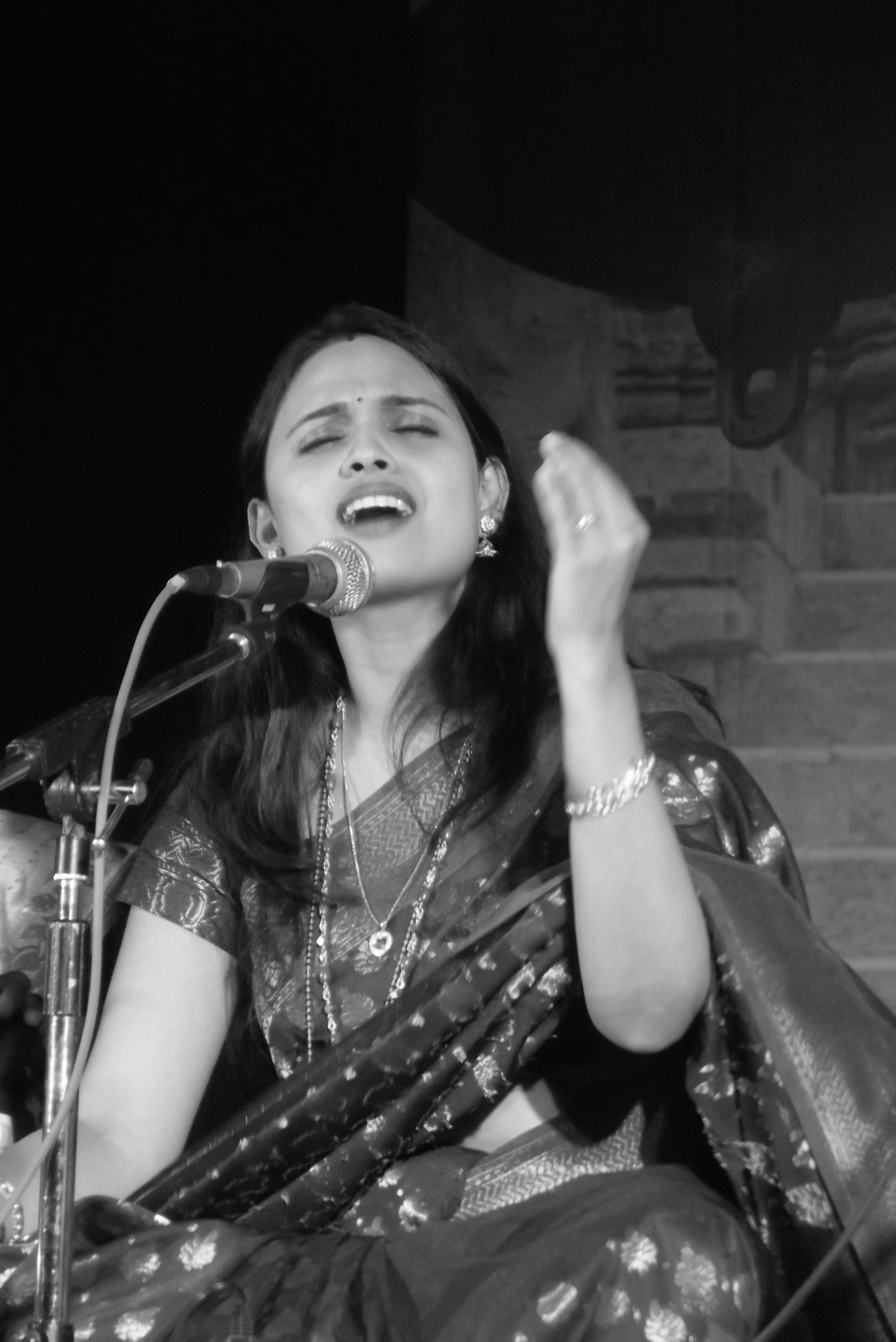
- Nayak in 2012
- Occupation: Vocalist
- Years active: 1993–present
- Spouse: Sudheendra Kamath
- Awards: Yuva Srujan Puraskar (2013)
- Musical career
- Genres: Indian classical, Hindustani Classical (Raag Sangeet Khyal), Natyageeta, Bhajan, Thumri, Tappa

Aarti Nayak-Kamath is an Indian Hindustani classical music vocalist working in the Gwalior gharana tradition. She has also performed in Sangeet Natak musical drama.

== Early life ==
Nayak hails from a musical family. Her father was Ramrao Nayak, a noted vocalist of the Kirana-Gwalior Gharana. Her paternal grandmother was Mukta Nayak, a devotional singer, while her maternal grandfather Hanumanth Kamath was a theatre actor.

At the age of 4, Nayak began her initial training in music under the guidance of her mother Pratima Nayak. At 6, her advance training in music began under the guidance of her father, a disciple of Bhaskarbua Ghodge (Gwalior Gharana). The girl's musical talents were noted by her father and by A. K. Abhyankar – Kirana Gharana (Disciple of Firoz Dastur) and V.R. Athavale (Gwalior Gharana), and they began developing her skills. At the age of 9, she began playing Tabla and Harmonium with no training. She has also learnt Sitar and Bharatnatyam.

Nayak is a Sangeet Alankar and Sangeet Visharad of Akhil Bharatiya Gandharva Mahavidyalaya Mandal, Mumbai and is a Rank holder. She has also obtained M.A (Music) from the SNDT University, Mumbai and holds a post graduate degree in commerce.

== Performing career ==
She has been giving successful concerts of Hindustani classical music and semi-classical music including Natyageeta, Bhajan, Thumri, and Tappa under the auspices of many musical organisations across India. Venues at which she has performed include:

- Soorya Festival, Thiruvananthapuram
- Youth Festival by Sangeet Natak Academy
- Kashi Sangeet Samaj – Varanasi, Uttar Pradesh
- Sangeet Nritya Academy Sammelan, Bengaluru
- Pt. Vishnu Digambar Paluskar Samaroha, Hyderabad
- Shani Jayanti Music Festival, Indore
- Temple Music Festival, Bengaluru
- Surashree Kesarbai Kerkar Smriti Sangeet Samaroha, Goa
- Nehru Centre, Worli Mumbai
- Platinum Jubilee Celebration at Gandharve Mahavidyalaya, Vashi, Mumbai

She has also featured in Marathi Sangeet Natak musical drama, playing lead roles in various Sangeet Nataks such as Sangeet Saubhadra, Sangeet Saushay Kallol, Sangeet Yayati ani Devayani, and Sangeet Manaapman.

She has given playback for the national award-winning Marathi film Savalee (2007), which is based on Indian classical music.

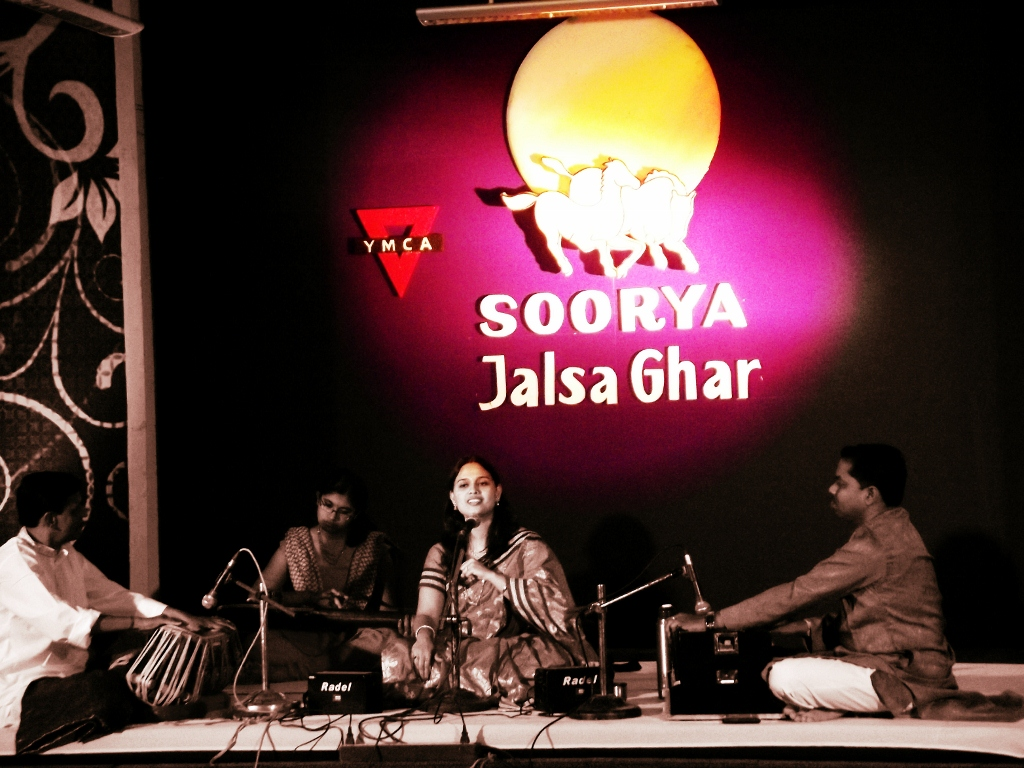
Aarti Nayak performing in Soorya Festival, Trivandrum.

== Personal life ==
Nayak is married to Sudheendra Kamath, an engineer by profession, and they live in Margao, Goa.

== Awards and recognitions ==
- Pt Basavraj Rajguru National youth award
- Yuva Srujan Award (Navasarjan Chetana Puraskar – Music) by Art & Culture dept, Goa Government for the year 2013-14
- Sangeet Ratna by Kashi Sangeet Samaj, Varanasi.
- Yashadamini Award by Goa Government for achievements in Music
- Giants International Award in recognition for achieving highest standard of work in the field of music.
- SurMani by the Sur Singar Samsad, Mumbai.
- Saraswat Yuva Puraskar, by Kodial Khabar Mangalore, for excellence achieved in the field of music.
- Won the All India Radio competition for Semi Classical Category (1999–2000) & for Light Music Category (2001–2002)
- Vamandaji Puraskar, organized by Vasantrao Achrekar Sanskrutik Pratishthan, Kanakawli, Maharashtra.
- Awarded as Best Singer in the Hindustani Classical Vocal Category in the National Youth Festival, Trivendram, Kerala.
- Awarded as 'Best Actress' in Marathi Sangeet Natak by Maharashtra Natya Mandal, Sangli, Maharashtra.
