= Maniilal Sabarimala =

Indian painter

Maniilal Sabarimala is an Indian painter and curator, best known for his acrylic paintings of Lord Ganesha. A graduate of the University of Mysore, the University of Hyderabad, the University of Kerala, the University of Bangalore, and the University of California, his works have been displayed at the Lalit Kala Akademi, the Darpan Art Gallery, and the Salar Jung Museum.

== Selected works ==
- Sabrimala, Maniilal (30 April 2018). Absolute: Painters and Paintings. Notion Press. ISBN 978-1-64249-445-7.
