= Frederika Menezes =

Indian author, poet and artist

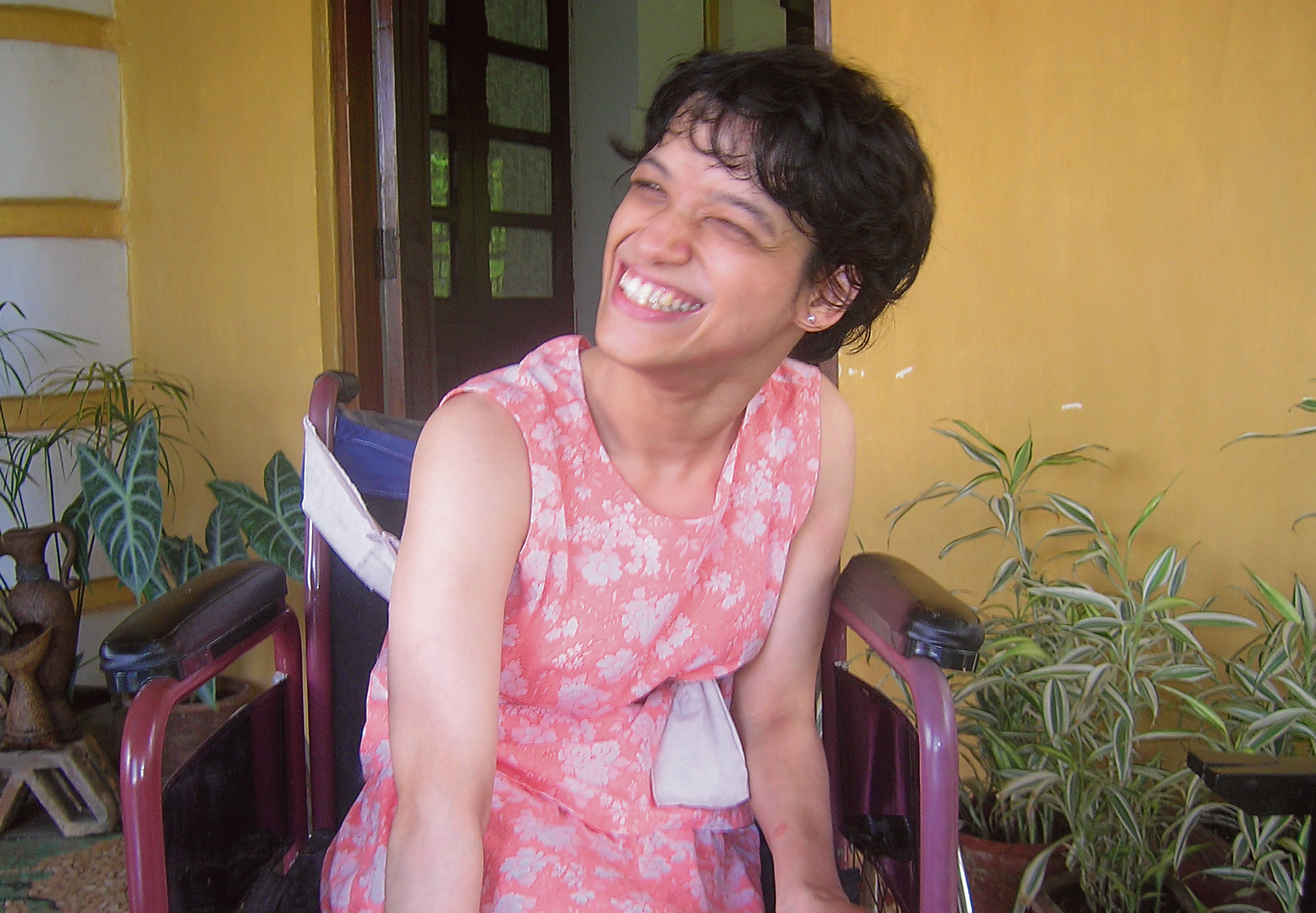
- Menezes in 2018
- Born: 1979 or 1980 (age 46–47); Panjim, Goa, India
- Occupations: Author; poet; artist
- Writing career
- Language: English
- Years active: 1996–present
- Notable work: Unforgotten (2014)
- Notable awards: Yuva Srujan Puraskar (2016)

Frederika Menezes (born 1979 or 1980) is an Indian author, poet, and artist best known for her book Unforgotten, a love story for young adults published in 2014. Her poem "The Different Normals" has yet to be included in the English textbook of the Goa Board of Secondary and Higher Secondary Education (GBSHSE).

== Early life and education ==
Frederika Menezes was born in either 1979 or 1980, to physicians, Jose Menezes and Angela Fonseca e Menezes and grew up in Altinho, Panjim. She was diagnosed with cerebral palsy when she was one year old. She is a supporter of disability rights. Menezes completed her schooling at People's High School, Panjim in 1996.

== Career ==
Menezes began writing poetry when she was encouraged by her teacher to do a class project, and it was at that point that she discovered her passion for writing poems.

Menezes's other literary works include The Portrait (a collection of poems, published in 1998), The Pepperns and Wars of the Mind (a fantasy novel, published in 2003) and Stories in Rhyme (which was a book of verse for children, released in 2014). She is also a budding artist. She does her paintings digitally (on a tablet, smartphone or PC), using only one finger. Some of her paintings include The Grieving Madonna, Tourada, Mother Sea and First Kiss.

== Awards and recognition ==
Menezes was awarded the Yuva Srujan Puraskar Award in Literature in 2016. Her first book received praise from the late Dr. Abdul Kalam, the then President of India. She was also given the opportunity to recite from her book of poems in the Goa Legislative Assembly, in front of him. In 2019, Samraat Club, Panjim, felicitated her at her home on the occasion of International Women's Day.

Also in 2019, Menezes was invited as a Chief Guest for an art exhibition of the Mouth and Foot Painting Artists Association (MFPA), was chosen by the Election Commission of India to be the "disability voting icon" for North Goa district during the 2019 Indian general election and spoke at TEDxPanaji on optimism, positivity and determination.
