= Sammy Tavares =

Indian playwright and theatre director (born 1962)

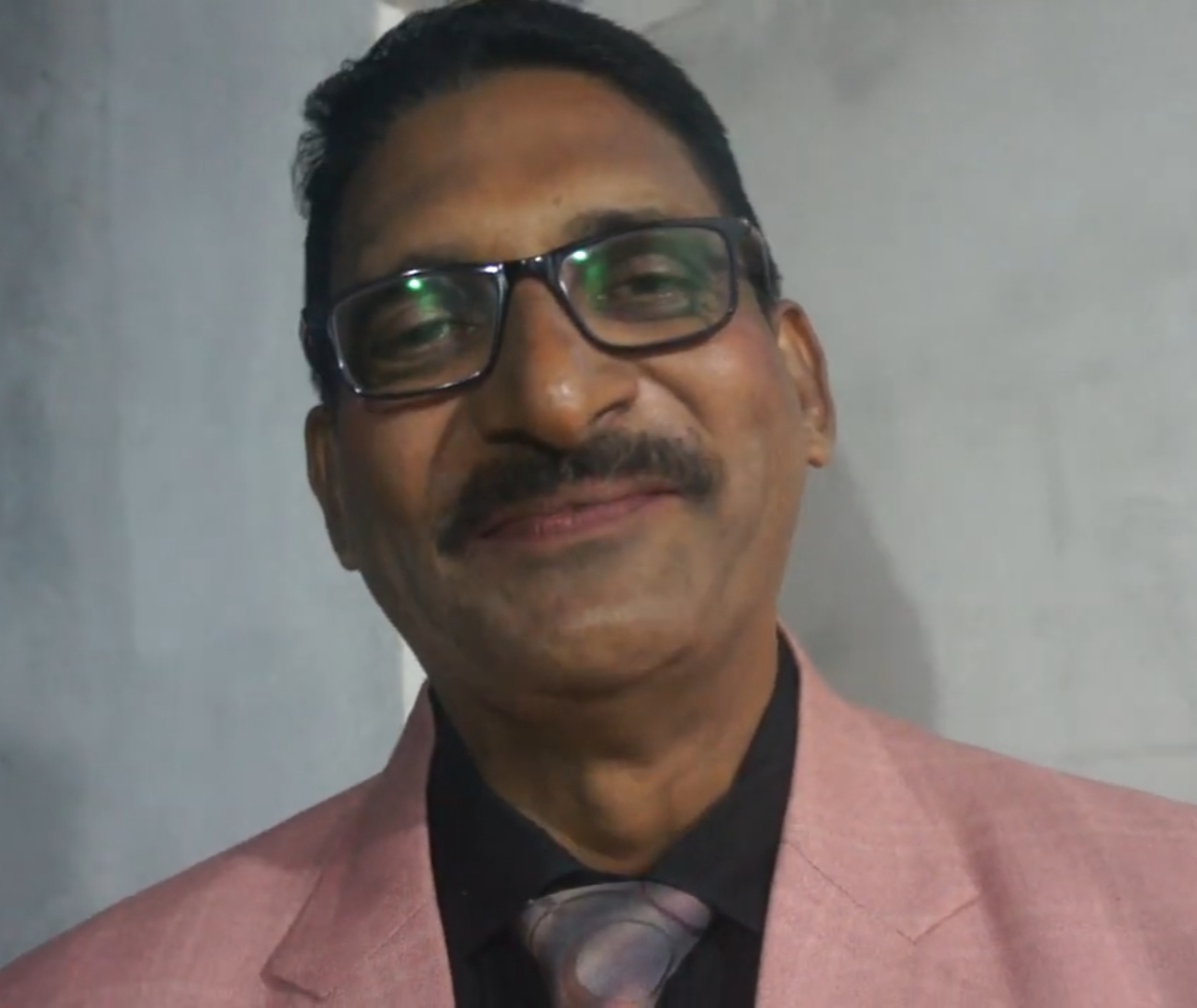
- Tavares in 2023
- Born: 1 November 1962 (age 63); Cuncolim, Goa, India
- Occupations: Playwright; theatre director; singer
- Years active: 1970s–present
- Spouse: Aluxia Fernandes (m. 1991)
- Children: 1
- Awards: President's Police Medal (2022)
- Website: facebook.com/sammy.tavares.56

Sammy Caraciolo Tavares (born 1 November 1962) is an Indian playwright, theatre director, singer, and former police officer of the Goa Police Service (GPS), who served as the Superintendent of Police at the Konkan Railway Police Station in Margao. He is known for his work in tiatr (theatre) productions.

== Early life ==
Sammy Caraciolo Tavares was born on 1 November 1962 in Cuncolim, Goa, India, to Teodosio Tavares. He had two brothers. His elder brother, Max (1961–1997), was based in Bahrain. Tavares's familial background has connections to both the Goan liberation movement and the tradition of tiatr. His father, Teodosio, a freedom fighter during Portuguese rule in Goa, utilized the platform of tiatr to voice his dissent through his song against the colonial regime. His performances, particularly in the region of Cuncolim, resonated with the local populace and contributed to the growing anti-colonial sentiment.

This act of defiance, however, led to Teodosio's imprisonment for eight months in the Aguada Jail. His song was later documented in the Marathi historical book Svotontr Laddeacho Itihas (Vol II) by Manohar Rai Sardesai. The family's engagement with tiatr extended beyond his father's activism. Tavares's relatives, including his uncles Theotoliano and Michael, as well as his brother Max, played a role in the tiatr genre as both writers and performers in Cuncolim. Tavares's own introduction to tiatr occurred during his school years in the late 1970s.

== Theatrical career ==
Tavares's introduction to the stage was characterized by a degree of trepidation. He made his full theatrical debut in the late 1970s, participating in his brother Max's penned tiatr, Vingas. Prior to this, Tavares's stage appearances were confined to guest roles in the performances directed by his father and brother, which took place at the yearly village festival. The trio, comprising Tavares, Astromir, and Milton, opted for a comedic song, which was met with approval from the audience. The group's performance was met with praise, resulting in several requests for them to reprise their act on stage.

Tavares's entry into the professional music scene occurred later in his life, following a performance at the Summer Tiatr Festival. The festival, coordinated by the Rising Club Sanvorcotto, an organization situated in Cuncolim, provided a platform for his song "Porot Ghara Vor" (Take me back home). The song, focusing on the struggles of senior citizens in care facilities, received recognition from members of the tiatr community. Comedian Agostinho and Xavier Gomes, impressed by the song's emotional impact and Tavares's songwriting talent, encouraged him to pursue a more active role in the industry. Motivated by this recognition, Tavares began composing, resulting in a collection of nine songs. These compositions were later recorded and released in his debut album, Police Porjek, in 2010. The album featured popular tiatr singers such as Lawry Travasso, Xavier Gomes, and Aniceto. Tavares continued to release music, with subsequent albums Dessak Bhettoi and Mhaka Mog Goykarancho (2013).

Tavares's career trajectory encompassed both public service and artistic expression. During the period of 1981–1982, he participated in the development of one-act plays and took the initiative to host competitions dedicated to one-act performances in the town of Cuncolim. In 1987, he transitioned into a career in law enforcement, enlisting in the Goa Police as a Sub-inspector. Despite the demands of his new role, Tavares remained actively involved in the Konkani theatre, balancing his police duties with his artistic pursuits. This simultaneous engagement was enabled by the support of his commanding officers, who granted the necessary permissions without any impediments. Nehanda, his daughter and a fellow police officer, noted that her father managed to fulfill both his police obligations and his passion for the Konkani stage without idling away his free time. Whenever he had time off from his law enforcement duties. Tavares actively participated in theatrical performances, noting his willingness to work late nights.

Tavares's work in the Goa Police Service (GPS) significantly influenced his involvement in tiatr, a popular Konkani theatrical tradition. His early roles as Station House Officer demanded extensive time commitment, limiting his opportunities to participate in tiatr. Upon promotion to Deputy Superintendent of Police (DySP), his responsibilities shifted to a supervisory role, affording him more time to pursue his artistic interests. Tavares's tiatr career enabled him to have international reach. In 2014, he temporarily stepped away from the Konkani theatrical scene, later reemerging in 2017 with a new play titled Police Officer. He achieved the distinction of being the inaugural tiatr director to perform in North America, with the debut of his second tiatr, Tim Thikam Sanddlolim, taking place in 2014. This production subsequently toured the UK, Dubai, and Kuwait. His debut play, known as Aplea Bhurgeam Sangata, premiered in 2012 and was showcased in multiple international venues, such as Paris, the United Kingdom, Dubai, Kuwait, and Muscat. The play Police Officer, his third production further expanded his international presence, performing in the US, Canada, UK, Dubai, Kuwait, Muscat, and Bahrain.

== Personal life ==
Tavares is married. He has a daughter, Nehanda, who is a fellow police officer. Max, brother of Tavares, was instrumental in the promotion of tiatrs among the Goan community in Bahrain. He organized performances featuring popular artists, including Roseferns, John D' Silva, Rosario Rodrigues, William de Curtorim, and the duo Wilmix-Sharon. His sister-in-law Espy, Max’s wife, along with her son, Gladston, are also tiatr promoters formerly based in Bahrain and later in the UK.

Max died in 1997, around the age of 36. Tavares identifies as a Catholic and is recognized for his deep religious convictions. He also holds a strong reverence for St. Anthony of Padua and the Hindu goddess Shantadurga Kunkalikarin. Despite lacking formal training in singing, his musical development was impacted by the artistic contributions of his uncles, Theotoliano and Michael, during his formative years.

Tavares is actively involved in supporting marginalized communities. In response to the COVID-19 pandemic, he wrote a song highlighting the threats posed by the virus. He engaged in street performances to disseminate important information and alert the public about the health risks associated with the pandemic.
