= Prabha Marathe =

Indian dancer and choreographer (born 1936)

Prabha Marathe (born 8 October 1936, in Pune) is an Indian dancer, choreographer, and teacher, best known for founding the Kalachhaya Cultural Centre in 1965. A student of the Kathak dance under Pandit Birju Maharaj, she trained at the Shriram Bharatiya Kala Kendra in New Delhi, and has been credited with popularising and documenting the techniques of Kathak in Maharashtra in the 1980s.
