= Soorya Festival =

Annual arts festival in Kerala, India

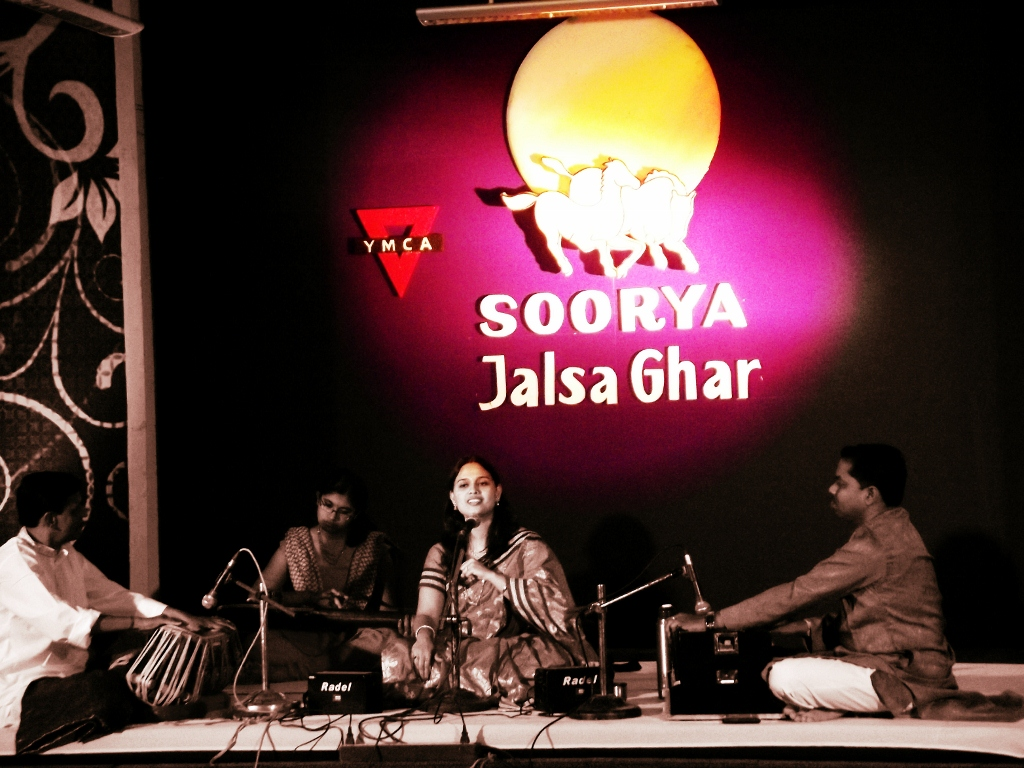
- Aarti Nayak performing in Jalsa Ghar
- Genre: Arts festival
- Dates: 21 September 2017 – 10 January 2018 (exact dates vary each year)
- Location: Thiruvananthapuram
- Country: India
- Years active: 1977–present
- Founded: 1977; 49 years ago

The Soorya Festival is one of the world's largest arts festivals, which in 2017 lasted 111 days and featured 2,000 artists from across India. It is the biggest art and cultural event in Kerala. The Soorya Festival features various art forms and events, including film festivals, theater festivals, dance, music, painting and photography exhibitions. Established in 1977, it takes place annually in Thiruvananthapuram city in the Indian state of Kerala, in the months of September to January.
