= Gopal Deuskar =

Indian painter (1911–1994)

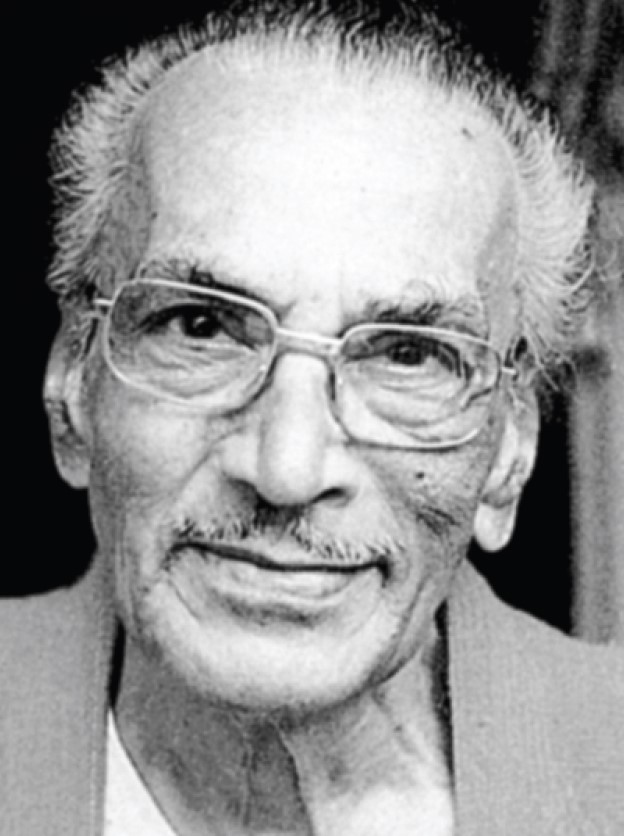
- Born: Gopal Damodar Deuskar; 11 September 1911; Ahmednagar, Maharashtra, India
- Died: 8 February 1994 (aged 77); Pune, India
- Education: Sir J. J. School of Art, Mumbai
- Known for: Painting
- Style: Realism
- Spouse(s): Kamalini, Juilee, Madhavi
- Father: Damodar
- Relatives: Shanta (elder sister)

Gopal Damodar Deuskar (11 September 1911, in Ahmednagar – 8 February 1994, in Pune) was an Indian painter, best remembered for his portraits and murals of notable Indian royalty, politicians, and diplomats. A graduate of the Sir J. J. School of Art and the Royal Academy of London, his murals are displayed at the Bal Gandharva Ranga Mandir and the Tilak Smarak Ranga Mandir. His portraits have been displayed at the New Parliament House, New Delhi, the Rashtrapati Bhavan, the Victoria Memorial, Kolkata, Bombay High Court, the Supreme Court of India, India House, London, and the Nehru Centre Art Gallery. A proponent of the Gurukul painting method, Raghuveer Bharam was his student.

== Early life ==
Originally from the region of Dewas in Madhya Pradesh, the Deuskar family later settled in Ahmednagar. Gopal Damodar Deuskar was born on 11 September 1911 in a family which had a background in art. While his father was an art teacher in the Mission High School in Ahmednagar, his grandfather Vamana was a sculptor of religious idols. Similarly, his uncle Ramkrishna Waman Deuskar was a renowned painter who worked at the Nizam's Durbar in the Princely State of Hyderabad and played a key role in the establishment of the famous Salar Jung Museum there in 1951, subsequently becoming its first curator. When Deuskar was two years old, he lost his parents to the flu and was looked after by his relatives in Ahmednagar. He later moved to Hyderabad to live with his uncle due to his growing inclination towards art.

== Education ==
Deuskar completed his schooling in Ahemdnagar and moved to Hyderabad to stay with his uncle, where he did his matriculation. After this, he enrolled in the JJ School of Art and moved to Mumbai in 1927. In Mumbai, he stayed with his brother-in-law, Bapurao Pendharkar, and his theatre troupe called the Lalitkaladarsha Natak Mandali. Living in the company's quarters, he listened to their music rigorously, even coming in contact of the famous Bal Gandharava Natak Mandali. His association with the theatre and its actors made a lasting impact on the painter, inspiring him to make their sketches. In 1931, Deusakar graduated from the school with a first rank and also won a gold medal.

The Nizam of Hyderabad later granted him a five-year scholarship for pursuing his higher studies in Europe. Consequently, he went to study at the Royal Academy of Arts in London. Deuskar gained immense popularity due to the consistent exhibition of his works in the international summer exhibitions held by the academy, becoming the only Indian to do so. His works were also selected by the Royal Academy for the British Empire Exhibitions which were to be held in the British colonies. This increasing fame, resulted in an extension of his scholarship by five years.

== Early career ==
Deuskar's career started right from his years at the JJ School of Art, as his artworks were selected by Principal Gladstone Solomon for an exhibition in London, where they were admired and appreciated. Subsequently, he also won a gold medal at the Bombay Art Society and the Indian Railyway's First Prize. At the Shimla exhibition, he also won the Viceroy's Medal. Influenced by the western traditions, Deuskar went on to create paintings like the 'Picnic' and 'A Bull's Holiday', which reflect his incination towards the modern art movements that were materializing in Europe. His paintings Shakuntala and The Bull's Holiday were also exhibited in the academy exhibitions, winning him immense admiration. However, when these paintings were printed on the cover of the Marathi magazine Sahyadri, Deuskar faced opposition from conservatives who had taken offence to the bold depiction of half-naked women in subjects related to Indian rituals and mythologies.

In 1938, Deuskar returned to India, and in 1939 he was appointed as the deputy director of the JJ School of Art. In the Times of India Annual issue of 1939, Gladstone Solomon wrote about Deuskar, appreciating his skill in both the Indian and Western art traditions, concluding that the painter will go on to create his own individualised free Indian style. However, Deuskar made his mark on the art of modern India as a professional portraitist. His inclination towards academic realism created a rift between him and the director of the JJ School of Art, Charles Gerard, who was an advocate of modernism.

After this, the Maharaja of the Baroda state, Pratapsinhrao Gaekwad, invited Deuskar to work as his court painter. Resigning from his post at the school, he went to Baroda in 1941. Here, Deuskar went on create numerous of his masterpieces. One of his monumental works includes the painting of the coronation ceremony of the Maharaja, which can still be seen on display in the Durbar Hall of the Laxmi Vilas Palace in Baroda. This massive painting which is seventeen feet tall, depicts the Maharaja striding on his horse accepting the salute of his army which is positioned behind him. Another one of his remarkable works is his life-size portraits of the Nizam Sir Hyder of the Princely state of Hyderabad, which he painted in 1939 and hence is one of his early works. After this, Deuskar went on to paint the portraits of various royals like Fatehsinhrao Gaekwad, Maharanis Shantadevi and Sitadevi, etc. His command and expertise in the art of portraiture quickly spread to the other princely states like Jaipur, Cooch Behar, Porbundar and Junagadh where he was commissioned to paint portraits.

== Post-Independence ==
Even after independence when the Princely states were no longer in existence, Deuskar's popularity and fame continued to grow as he was appointed as the official national portraitist by all-party committee of the Indian Parliament. He was repeatedly called to decorate the walls of various buildings of national importance like the Rashtrapati Bhavan, Delhi Municipal Corporation, Victoria Memorial Museum in Kolkata, the Supreme Court of India and the Bombay High Court. He was also called to paint at the India House in London, where he drew portraits of eminent personalities like Raja Ram Mohan Roy and Lokmanya Bal Gangadhar Tilak.

Deuskar is also known for his portraits of notable individuals like J.R.D. Tata, M.C. Setalvad, the Attorney General of India, Vishnushastri Chiplunkar and Acharya Atre, the Governors of the Reserve Bank of India and of various senior officials of the Indian Air Force and Army. Deuskar was also the representative of India at the International Symposium on Visual Art which was held in Vienna in 1960. Among his later works, one of his most ambitious projects was a seven feet by fifty feet large mural titled as 'Karmayoga', in which he depicted the life of Lokmanya Bal Gangadhar Tilak, painted at the Tilak Smarak Mandir, Pune in 1971. While he was accustomed to painting commissioned portraits, he started painting and donating portraits of the founders of the Fergusson College, Pune. These include portraits of leaders like Bal Gangadhar Tilak, Gopal Ganesh Agarkar, N.M. Joshi, Wrangler Paranjape, Wrangler Mahajan, Dr. Shriram Lagoo and P.L. Deshpande, all of which can still be seen in the collection of the Fergusson College. The Directorate of Art, Maharashtra State also felicitated him on the occasion of the Silver Jubilee Celebration of the State Art Exhibition.
