= List of bands from Goa =

This is a list of musical bands from the region of Goa, which is a prominent musical center in South Asia. In music, a musical ensemble or band is a group of musicians that works together to perform music.

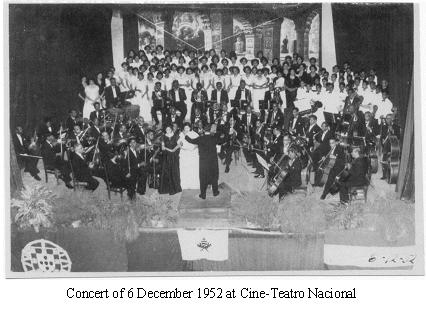
Orquestra Sinfonica de Goa. Founded in 1952.

Goa, which sits on the Arabian Sea in southwest India and is the nation's smallest state, was a territory of Portugal from 1510 to 1961. While its official language is the Konkani language, until 1961, most Goans were educated in Portuguese. Today, many Goans are Catholic, speak Portuguese and have Portuguese names. Between the Portuguese colonization and the 19th century influx of the British and other westerners, Goa was the most westernized area of India. It is where western music took root and most of India's jazz musicians came from Goa.

Aparupa Mazumder has written that, in 1934, "Goan musicians formed the Bombay Symphony and in 1947, they formed the Bombay Madrigal Singers Organization". She also notes that Goa has "given birth to famous artists" like Chris Perry, Chic Chocolate and Lorna "though many got their break in Mumbai".

Brass bands have also been popular in the region but are now dying out.

Following is a list of bands, compiled from various sources, some print and also online, such as the WhatsApp-based Bands in Goa groups which as of September 2020 link around 200+ musicians connected to Goa

== Brass band ==
- Don Bosco's, Panjim, had school brass band from 1968 onwards, from memory, trained and conducted by Mestre Santana Cota of Mercês. Among the players, Darryl Figueiredo played the trumpet and Ian Figueiredo (then a student) played the saxophone.
- Ultra Brass Sound (Rui Lobo)
- The Rubber Band, headed by A D Deniz, active around 2011.
- Manovikas High School Brass Band

== Christian band ==
- Band of Priests
- Faith, Margao-based band
- Olavo Rodrigues, Konkani Gospel
- Shepherd's Voice

== Choir ==
- All For Jesus
- Celebration, Since 1991
- Rhythm Divine (https://www.instagram.com/rhythm.divine_?utm_source=qr)
- Divind Harmony Choral Ensemble
- Goa University Choir, founded in August 2013, no longer extant
- Goencho Nad directed by Fr. Camilo Xavier.
- Harmonics-Chandorchim Motiam
- Harmonizers, led by Alvaro Pereira (Utorda)
- Heavenly Voices Choir
- Fr Peter Cardoz's choir
- Holy Spirit Choir
- Our Lady of Lourdes Choir
- Sanctus
- Santa Cecilia Choir
- Santa Cruz parish choir. Led by José Santana Cota. Feasts, weddings, funerals
- Seraphic Voices
- Stuti Choral Ensemble
- St Elizabeth Choir Ucassaim
- God's Love In Harmony, Porvorim

== Cover band ==
- A26
- Alcatrazz
- Amazers Band (Margao-Goa)
- Aqua Strings (Panjim)
- Aquatech
- Archies Band (Verna)
- Artwork
- Audacity (Margao)
- Aztecs
- Band Ambassadors

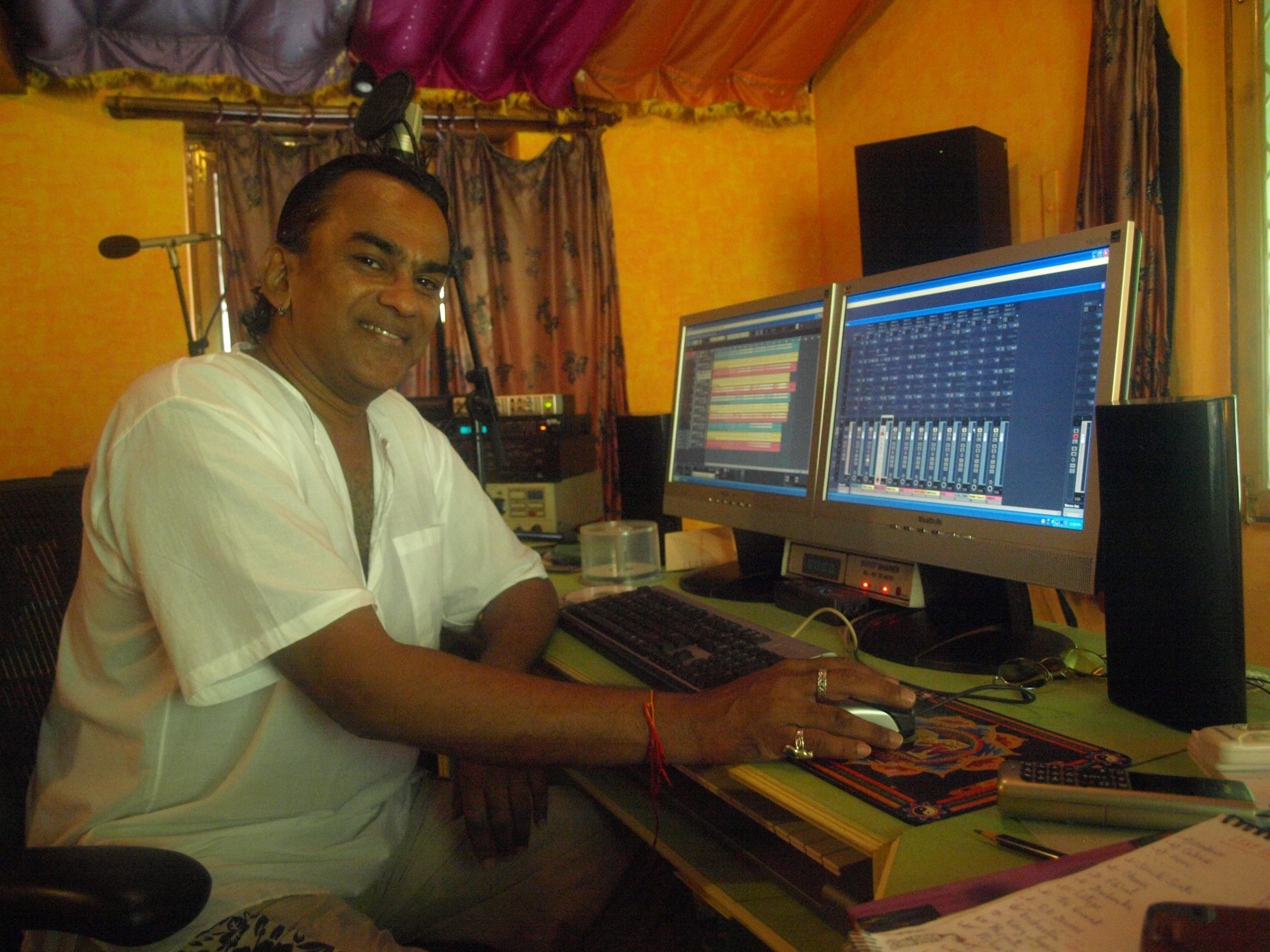
Pop star Remo Fernandes, at his recording studio in Siolim

* Beat 4 (1960s and 1970s) Beat 4 was led by Remo Fdes, composed of late Alexandre do Rosario, late Caetano Abreau, tony Godinho/Steve Sequeira. Their rivals were Beethovens and later on Brood of Vipers, Scorpions of Africa, etc. for the annual Simla Beat Contest qualifiers.

- Beatovens from South Goa. Dr. Roy Sales Andrade from Margao (now in Brazil) led the band. Among others were late Nobby Noronha from Seraulim and Chris Dias from Navelim.
- Bees
- Big Country Band (Panjim)
- Billy Rangers
- Billy n De Kids
- Black IN White
- Black Slade
- Bliss
- Blue Note Trio (with George Fernandes, pianist)
- Blue Orange
- Blue Turtle
- Blue Waves
- Boyfriends
- Brood of Vipers
- Brothers in Arms (Taleigao)
- Cascades (Caranzalem)
- Chocolate Highway
- Civilians
- Clayjars
- Climax
- Cloudburst
- Cream
- Crusaders
- Crimson Tide (Panjim)
- Crossroads. 1991 to 2001. Margao. Winners of the Kala Academy All Goa Pop, Rock and Jazz contest first prize in 1993.
- Cyclones
- Deep Red
- Diamonds
- Ebony
- Ecstacy
- Electric Fire (Aldona – Cyril, Elen, Cosme Fernandes), 1989–1994. Performed at FABR and THV (Sinquerim), Colonia Santa Maria (Baga), weddings.
- Emiliano and The Gay Caballeros
- Entertainers, at FABR in 1990
- Excellence
- Fantasy
- Footprints. Aldona. Started in 2019. Marino de Souza and team.
- Forefront (Chapora)
- Funk 49
- Genesis
- Goa Amigos (Dona Paula)
- Gold Dust
- Harmony
- Headlines
- Hard Rock
- Heaven 7
- Heritage Jazz (Campal)
- Horizon (Loutolim)
- Human Touch (South Goa)
- Imagination
- Impact
- India (Goa Velha)
- Indiana with Remo, Bondo, Lala and Abel
- Jazz 5, Carlos Monteiro's band (with Avelino, Douglas, Anthony, Caji, Crispin, Tino, Ivo
- Jazz Junction
- Jazz Messengers
- Jazz Quartet
- K7 Band Goa
- Karma
- L'ace (Panjim)
- La Scala
- Lemongrass Acoustic Trio, consisting of Joy Dawson on guitar and voice; Anand Lobo on mandolin, viola, cajon, and voice; and Malaika de Souza as the lead vocalist
- Legends
- Les Vandals
- Luis & His Melodians
- Lynx (see Link below)
- Limits
- Link (formed by Xisto, Georgie, Ponos. Agusto joined later. There was another bass player before Agusto. Terry was the additional fifth member who joined them just one year before the Oberoi contract. In 1981 Darryl Rodrigues joined the Link and in 1983 Bangdo joined. In 1989, Conny and Miller joined them at Oberoi's after Bangdo and Darryl left. Later Conny, Agusto and Terry formed Lynx with James Rebello and Jude Vaz. Xisto carried on with the Link at Oberoi's. We still have the Lynx uptil now, Sept 2020. The Band of the Sand with Sandy on the lead vocals.)
- Magnum Opus (with Black Michael)
- Manpower
- Mark Revlon The Band*
- Men Machine
- Moderates
- Modulators (Led by Babush)
- Microwave Papudums
- Milestones (Benaulim 1997 - Lead Derick Pereira, Terrence Fernandes, Harish, Julios, Michael Carvalho* )
- Music Company
- Muzik Mann
- New Generation
- New Human Touch, 1986–90
- Nexus
- NH17
- Obligato
- Obsession
- Oramins & Orabeats were Don Bosco Oratory Panjim bands started by Fr. Edward. Oramins had Bondo on drums, Abel on Bass, Darryl Figueredo on Rhythm guitar, Zito Menezes on Lead guitar and Henry Pinheiro on vocals.
- Pirates
- Phoenix
- Pure Magic
- Purple Rain (Ribandar)
- Raagas to Riches
- Radio Serenaders, possibly mid-1950s till 1970s.
- Rainstorm with Diana
- Remo & Bondo
- Ringers, 1950s–1970s, played for weddings, Colva and Margao clubs and radio Emissora de Goa, Carnival, serenading, cabaret dances. Led by Emercio Rodrigues (guitar, violin, vocals) with members Stephen Dias (Bass on rabeca), Crescencio Dourado (mandolin), Luis Joao Rodrigues (gumott, violin, guitar, vocals) and Domingos (guitar). Played Portuguese, Konkani songs, mandos, Spanish, Brazilian numbers, and a few Hindi songs.
- Rocking Beats
- Rolling Beats
- Rome of the East
- Ronnie M in Bombay in the 1980s led by Ronnie Monserrate
- Royal Symphony, Varca, with Dominic
- Rhythm and Blues
- Seby N The Wings
- Shades (Curtorim)
- Santimano Family Band. Parents and eight children. Performed at Panjim gardens, mando festival, Clube Nacional and Clube Vasco da Gama.
- Silk Route
- Silver Lining
- Silver Strings, Margao-based early 1990s
- Silvia and the Beat Route Jam
- Simplicity
- Sixth Sense
- Sky
- Sky High
- Smooth
- Sonia and Fausta
- Sparks
- Spiders
- Square Heads
- Status 4
- Sting (also called The Sting, with August, Alex, Savio, Donny—later Darryl R.)
- Strangers
- Surya, fusion band, at FABR
- Taan-Trikz
- Tidal Wave
- The Aryans
- The Band
- The Bassman's Band
- The Big City Band
- The Big Country Band
- The Bliss
- The Brood of Vipers
- The Clique
- The Coffee Cats
- The Comets
- The Cream
- The Crest
- The Darts
- The Diamonds
- The Drifters (Errol) Chris Perry's son formed this around 1995 with the Silva Sisters
- The Earth Stage (Fusion) Elvin, Rumian and Cosme Fernandes
- The Forefront
- The Foremost
- The Greensleeves, 1970s
- The Hijackers
- The Jazz Messengers
- The Legends (Saligao)
- The Limits
- The Music Company
- The Musicians
- The New Faces
- The News
- The Oromines
- The Squad
- The Symphony
- The Syndicate
- The Voices
- The Renegades
- The Revelation
- The Trix
- The Usual Suspects
- The Valadares Sisters (Ruth, Jacinta, Lucia)
- Three Tale Trio
- Tidal Wave
- Tomorrow's People
- Triad
- True Blue
- Typhonns
- Symphony
- The Hijackers
- The Lynx (Chicalim)
- Under The Bridge
- Unfair Dead
- V4
- Vagabonds Cry
- Valentinos
- Vampires
- Ventures
- Victor Shreeves' band
- Vultures, around 1974–76.
- ELEMENTS

== Girl group ==
- Casual Encounters, mainly from Moira, circa 1990s.
- Poison Ivy, circa 1990s.

== Jazz band ==
- Blues Power
- Goa Grooves
- Lounge Jazz
- Jazz Goa Trio
- Smoking Chutney
- Latin Connection
- The Bassman's Band
- The Brown Indian Band
- The Suburban Jazz Ensemble
- Three Tale Trio

== One-Man and Duo Bands ==
- Clifton One Man Band https://goaweddingdirectory.com/clifton-one-man-band-solo-artist-live-performer-in-goa.php
- Bondo
- Bosco Dsouza (Goan drummer and percussionist)
- Chico Fonseca (Portuguese, Konkani, etc)
- Crossroads
- Danny One Man Band https://weddingsdegoa.com/wdglisting/danny-one-man-band/
- Elvis One Man Band
- Valentinos (duo band), founded in 2000 by Elv

is and Edgar DeSouza, Ribandar.

- Jukebox Duo (Tania and Andre)
- Haydn Dsouza (RETROLICIOUS)

https://instagram.com/music_man_haydn?igshid=YmMyMTA2M2Y=

== Orchestra ==
- Goa Choral Symphony
- Goa State Symphony Orchestra
- Orquestra Sinfónica de Goa (Goa Symphony Orchestra), first orchestra to be launched in 1952 under the baton of Maestro António Fortunato de Figueiredo.
- Panjim Open Philharmonic
- The Goa Strings Orchestra

== Early-to-mid 20th century Goan bands ==
Following bands were known in the past, but are no longer extant.

- Johnson and His Jolly Boys, from Siolim, prominent all over Goa. Also known as Orquestra Johnson de Siolim and Joãozinho e o seu Conjunto Alegre.
- The Miranda Brothers of Loutulim, charmed audiences in Pangim.
- Mestre Pedro Fernandes of Ilhas (Tiswaddi), sought after band from 1928.
- Mestre Caetano Varela Caiado from Merces conducted Banda Municipal de Pangim.
- Mestre José Santana Cota, from Santa Cruz.
- Mestre Sebasteão Cota, from Pangim.
- Mestre Paulo Dias from Divar nicknamed the Lotachem Band.
- Mestre Manuelinho Menezes, from Divar, and the Danddeachem Band.
- Merry Makers, Saligao
- Ignatius and his Swinging Boys
- Joe and his Havana Boys
- John Moonlight
- Jolly Brothers of Andrew
- Cuban Boys Serenate

== Goan bands outside Goa ==
- AudioCITY (Dubai), July 2019 till mid-2020. First line up: Blythe Rodrigues vocals, guitar. Denzil: vocals keyboards. Anselm: drums. Ryan Simoes: vocals, bass. Rodney: vocals, lead guitar. Second line up: Anselm Noronha on drums; Ryan Simoes on Bass; Denzil on keyboards; Shane on vocals, rhythm; Rodney Vaz on lead guitar. All in Dubai
- Top Ranks (Goan Band in Kuwait)
- Stepping Stones (Goan Band in Kuwait)
- Goans may have had an influence, and indeed a band or two, in Kuala Lumpur, Malaysia. A Gomes (perhaps the father of Prof. Alberto Gomes) was a pianist there. Theresinha Gonsalves from my neighbourhood was a pianist in Malaysia for many years.
- Canadian rock band Billy Talent has Ian D'Sa as its lead guitarist. The band from Mississauga, Ontario was formed in 1993 and formerly called Pezz. Billy Talent has sold over 900,000 physical albums in Canada alone and nearly 3 million albums internationally. It was among the top 10 best-selling Canadian bands in Canada.
- Bombay Music Lovers

== Miscellaneous music initiatives ==
- Music Circle
