= Kalachhaya Cultural Centre =

Cultural centre in Pune, India

The Kalachhaya Cultural Centre is a cultural and performing arts centre located in Pune, India. Founded by Prabha Marathe in 1965, it was established to teach the Lucknow gharana of the Kathak dance promoted by Pandit Birju Maharaj. The centre is the location of the Darpan Art Gallery and the Pune chapter of the Alliance française, and has hosted performances by Zakir Hussain, Badal Sircar, Pandit Jasraj, Jane Goldberg, Jamey Haddad.
