= Mastor (musician) =

Indian musician and trumpeter (1928–2011)

- Rebello in his later years
- Born: João Santana Rebêlo; 9 February 1928; Benaulim, Goa, Portuguese India, Portuguese Empire (now in India)
- Died: 2 December 2011 (aged 83); Benaulim, Goa, India
- Occupations: Musician; double bass player
- Years active: 1956–1980s
- Spouse: Faustina Rodrigues (m. 1966)
- Children: 8, including Luis and Jack

João Santana Rebello (né Rebêlo; 9 February 1928 – 2 December 2011), known mononymously as Mastor, was an Indian musician, double bass player, and former trumpeter known for his work in khell tiatr and zomnivoile khell (street play) productions.

== Early life ==
João Santana Rebêlo was born on 9 February 1928 in Benaulim, Goa, which was part of Portuguese India during the Portuguese Empire (now in India), to palm tree farmer Joaquim Peidade Rebelo and homemaker Pascoela Gomes, into a Goan Catholic family. He was the third of three children, with an elder brother João Caetano (born 1917) and a sister Jacinta (born 1924).

== Career ==
Rebello was a musician known for his contributions to the cultural scene. Originally a trumpet player in zomnivoile khells (street plays), he eventually shifted his focus due to health concerns and became actively involved in organizing khell competitions. Rebello played a pioneering role in bringing zomnivello khell to the stage, organizing the first-ever ticketed khell competitions. One of his significant accomplishments was the organization of the inaugural khell tiatr in Benaulim, Goa, featuring a competition between the works of mestri Anton Marie and Konkani playwright A. Moraes. In the late 1960s to the early 1980s, Rebello embraced the double bass and showcased his musical prowess as a member of the popular dance band, Luis and his Melodians, for 12 years. He collaborated with his brother Joao Caetano, who was also a musician proficient in the double bass, trumpet, and tuba. Rebello's brother Joao Caetano also led a brass band that performed at a variety of events, including feasts and funerals. During these performances, he would play either the snare drum or the big bass drum. Rebello's musical legacy influenced the next generation, particularly his two sons, Jack and Agnelo, who embarked on their own musical careers at a young age of 14 by joining their uncle Joao Caetano's band. Additionally, Rebello actively supported drama shows by providing essential amenities such as pandal facilities and organized parking spaces for the convenience of the attendees.

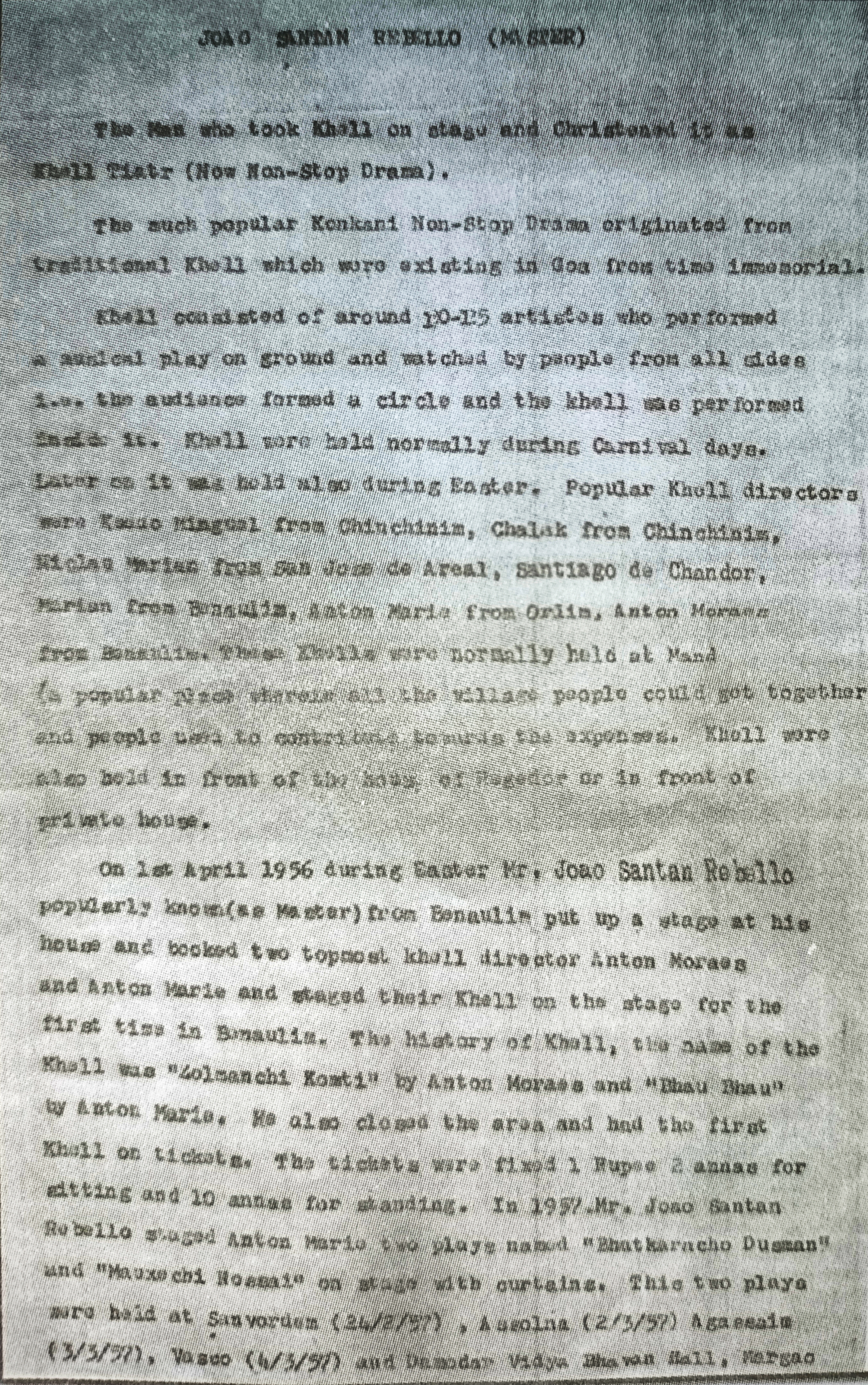
Rebello's typed letter about organizing the first khell on the stage in 1956.

Rebello played a crucial role in nurturing his son Luis's musical career, imparting drumming skills to him during his formative years. Concurrently, Rebello himself was an adept drummer. Additionally, Rebello was recognized as a proponent and patron of khells, a traditional Goan theatrical performance. Fostering an innovative idea, Rebello conceived the notion of hosting a zomnivoile khell competition on a stage akin to those employed in tiatrs, a popular form of Goan theater. To realize this vision, Rebello reached out to two khell maestros, Anton Moraes (A. Moraes) from Benaulim and Anton Marie from Orlim, who eagerly embraced the opportunity to showcase their zomnivoile khells on a stage, a novel prospect for them. Assuming the primary role in organization, Rebello meticulously coordinated the event. On an Easter evening of 1 April 1956, when several khells were already captivating audiences across Goan villages, Rebello collaborated with Manuel João Costa, a pandal decorator (mattoukar) from Varca, to erect a stage at Tolleabandh, Benaulim. The structure featured a mattou (pandal) housing a stage at one end, complemented by chairs arranged in front to accommodate the audience, akin to a tiatr setting. Unlike tiatrs, there were no elaborate curtains or intricate stage settings. Rather, the zomnivoile khell performed on this stage retained its original essence, with the actors directed to face the audience and deliver their performances upon request.

On that particular occasion, two distinct khells, which were popular forms of theatrical performances, were showcased. The first khell, titled Zolmachi Khomptti, was presented by A. Moraes, followed by Anton Marie's rendition of Bhau-Bhau (Brother-Brother). Rebello, the organizer of the event, had set aside an open space within the mattou (pandal) where spectators could stand and observe the performances. The event operated on a ticketed system, offering seating tickets priced at 1 rupee and 2 annas, while standing tickets were available for 10 annas. All tickets were sold out, indicating the event's triumph. It is worth noting that the intention of the event was not to foster competition, but rather to provide public entertainment. The audience thoroughly relished the performances, although no official awards were distributed. Nevertheless, the packed auditorium likely led attendees to form their own conclusions regarding which khell was superior, or perhaps perceive both as equally favourable. The significance of this day lies in the decision to bring the zomnivoilo khell, traditionally performed at ground level, onto the stage. This moment marked the initial stride towards the establishment of the khell tiatr, a theatrical tradition that would assume diverse names and forms, eventually even posing a challenge to the dominant Konkani tiatr in the entertainment realm. Rebello, A. Moraes, and Anton Marie Pereira were recognised for their collective efforts in propelling this significant advancement. "Without their collaboration, this groundbreaking leap forward would not have been conceivable", writes author Wilson Mazarello.

The zomnivoilo khell, a traditional theatrical performance, gained significant attention in the town of Tolleabandh, Benaulim. News spread that the khell had been performed on a stage, generating interest among those who had missed the initial show. However, organizing an immediate follow-up performance proved challenging for Rebello, the organizer, as both participating groups were already committed to other engagements. Despite this setback, the enthusiastic response from the audience encouraged Rebello to strive for an even more impressive production. In 1957, during the Carnaval season, Rebello collaborated with Anton Marie to stage two plays of his khell, Bhattkaracho Dusman (Landlord's Enemy) and Mauxechi Nossai (Aunt's Jealousy). A dedicated stage was constructed, complete with a traditional backdrop and seating arrangements. Rebello introduced stage settings and curtains, transforming the performance into a Konkani tiatr-like experience. The staged khells were showcased in various locations, including Sanvordem on 24 February 1957, Assolna on 2 March 1957, Agaçaim on 3 March 1957, and Vasco da Gama, Goa on 4 March 1957. Additionally, Rebello presented the same show at the Damodar Vidhya Bhawan in Margão. It is worth mentioning that Rebello continued to refer to the performance as "Anton Marie-cheo Don khellacheo Parti", with no evidence suggesting an alternate name. The introduction of khell performances on a theatrical stage sparked a wave of innovation among other khell contractors, with A. Moraes being one example. Inspired by Rebello's approach, these contractors began exclusively staging khells on a formal stage. Performances took the form of either a competition between two groups or two consecutive plays (don parti) by the same group. In the latter format, one play was presented before the intermission, and the other followed. The inclusion of stage settings and the shift towards staged khells marked an important evolution in this traditional art form, offering audiences a more visually engaging and immersive experience.

== Personal life ==
In his lifetime, Rebello was an agriculturist and farmer who lived in Maddar, Benaulim, Goa. Besides farming, he had a keen interest in bullfights and owned a prize-winning bull named Landdo. He was known for organizing bullfights and even coined the term "Dhirio" for these events, replacing the previous term "Boilam Gheram." In 1966, he married Faustina Florina Rodrigues from Orlim, Salcete, with a civil registration in Margão followed by a church wedding in Benaulim. Their three sons, Luis, Agnelo, and Jack, have made a mark as musicians in the Konkani music scene. Rebello died at the age of 83 in Pulvaddo, Benaulim, on 2 December 2011.
