= Yuva Srujan Puraskar =

Art and culture award presented by Government of Goa

- Awarded for: Excellence in Art and Culture in Goa
- Location: Kala Academy (2008, 2009, 2013, 2018, 2022); Sanskruti Bhavan, Panaji (2016, 2017); Institute Menezes Braganza (2011, 2012, 2014, 2015, 2021)
- Country: India
- Presented by: Government of Goa
- Eligibility: Individuals between the age 25–40 hailing from Goa
- Reward: ₹25,000 (US$270) (Note: From 2008 to 2010, the cash reward was ₹10,000 (US$110). From 2011 to 2015, it was ₹20,000 (US$210). Starting from 2016 onwards, the cash reward increased to ₹25,000.)
- First award: 2008
- Final award: 2022 (Note: Awards were not given for the year 2020–2021 due to the COVID-19 pandemic.)

Highlights
- Total awarded: 117
- Website: www.artandculture.goa.gov.in

The Yuva Srujan Puraskar (Navsarjan Chetana Puraskar) is an annual award conferred by the Department of Art and Culture of the Government of Goa. The main objective of this award is recognizing and observing the achievements of young individuals hailing from Goa who have demonstrated exemplary prowess in the domain of art and culture.

In recognition of their artistic achievements, eligible artists receive a commemorative item, a certificate of appreciation, and a financial reward amounting to ₹25,000 per individual.

== Aims ==
The objective of this program is to pay tribute to the young artists who have made significant contributions to the field of Goan art and culture. It seeks to honor and recognize the exceptional achievements of these talented individuals in their respective artistic domains. Furthermore, it aims to encourage, support, and identify these young artists as the emerging youth icons of the state.

== Eligibility ==
To be eligible for this award, an individual artist must be between the ages of 25 and 40, and their accomplishments in their specific artistic domain must be extraordinary. In certain extraordinary circumstances, the age criteria may be extended by up to 5 years, granting flexibility on a case-by-case basis. To qualify for consideration, artists from Goa must have dedicated a minimum of 5 years to their artistic pursuits within the state, demonstrating a significant impact on the artistic landscape.

The award is not conferred posthumously. However, in the event that an artist passes away after their nomination has been recommended, the Task Force Committee may deliberate on whether to bestow the award posthumously, taking into account the specific circumstances. Each individual artist is eligible to receive the award only once, and subsequent nominations will not be considered.

Every year, a maximum of 6 outstanding individuals in various artistic categories, including Music/Dance, Drama/Tiatr, Folk Art, Photography/Painting, Craft, Sculpture, Bhajan/Kirtan, Literature, and Film, are carefully evaluated for the Yuva Srujan Puraskar, ensuring recognition and appreciation for their significant contributions.

== Procedure ==
Annually, the Department of Art and Culture issues a press advertisement to extend an invitation for recommendations of deserving candidates for the Yuva Srujan Puraskar. This recognition is bestowed upon exceptional institutions and individuals who have made significant contributions in the field of art and culture.

The Department of Art and Culture reaches out to various institutions and individuals involved in the field to propose suitable candidates for the Yuva Srujan Puraskar, if necessary. Additionally, the committee responsible for this program has the authority to independently recognize exceptional accomplishments or contributions in the field of art by individual artists and include them for consideration. The selection of awardees is determined by the committee and not through self-nominations.

== Recipients ==
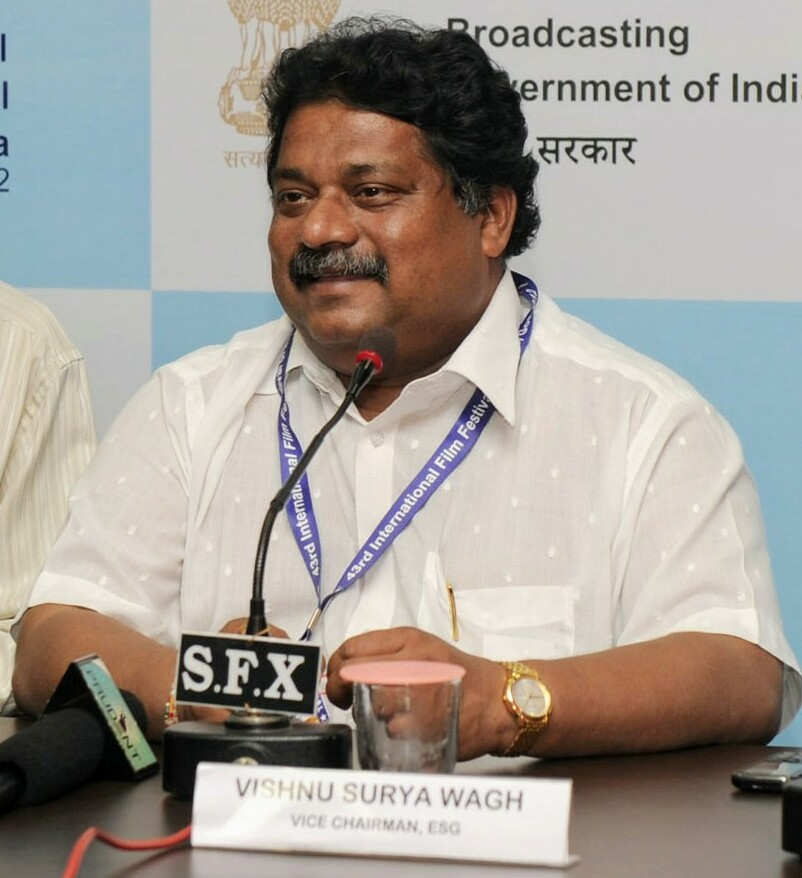
Vishnu Wagh was the first to receive the award.

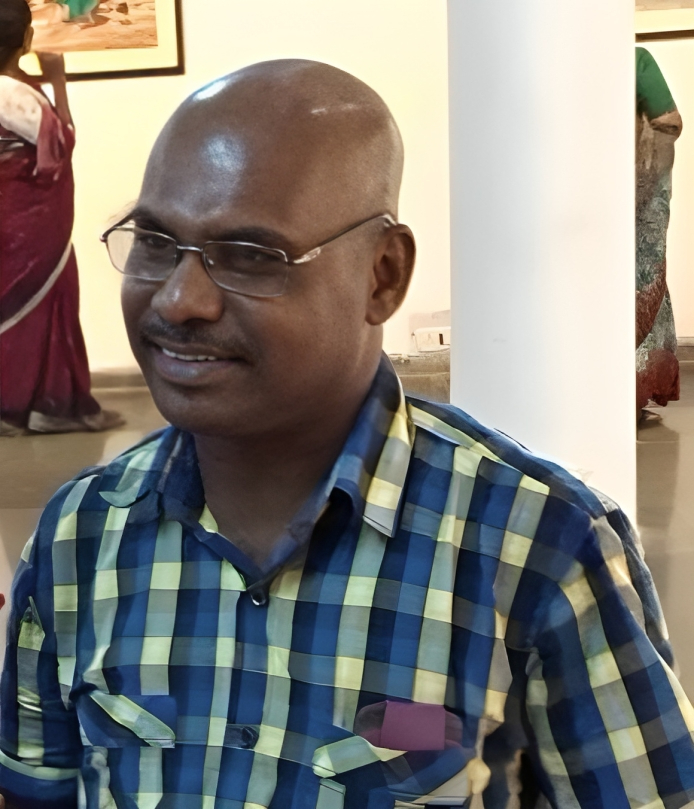
John D'Silva was the first to receive the award in the Tiatr field.

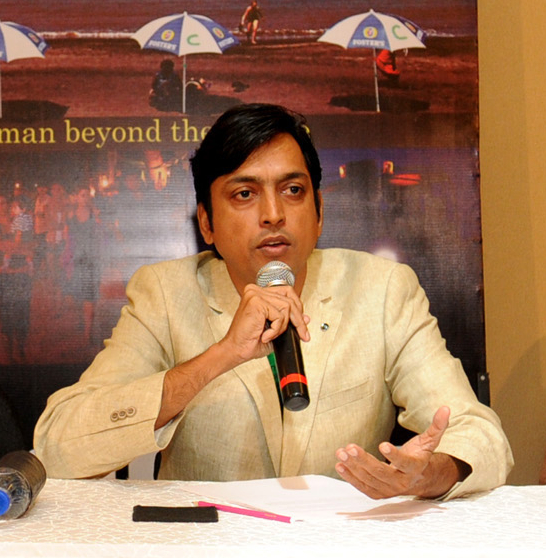
Laxmikant Shetgaonkar was the first and only recipient in the film field.

Year	Name	Field	Ref
2008	Vishnu Wagh	Literature	
2008	Vijaykumar Vishwanath Naik	Drama	
2008	Prachala Amonkar	Music	
2008	Viraj Naik	Fine Art	
2008	Elvis Goes	Folk Art	
2008	John D'Silva	Tiatr	
2008	Suhas Laxman Vaze	Kirtan	
2008	Sonu Keshav Shetgaonkar	Craft	
2009	Sumedha Dessai	Music	
2009	Devidas Amonkar	Drama	
2009	Rosy Alvares	Tiatr	
2009	Prakash Ramakant Vazrikar	Literature	
2009	Shalini K. Gaude	Craft	
2009	Laxmikant Shetgaonkar	Film	
2009	Vasudeo Divkar	Fine Art	
2009	Lawry Travasso	Music	
2010	Pravin P. Naik Gaonkar	Music	
2010	Samradni S. Marathe	Drama	
2010	Norman Cardozo	Music/Tiatr Music	
2010	Prakash S. Paryekar	Literature	
2010	Hemu alias Mahesh K. Gaude	Folk Art	
2010	Gurudas N. Sutar	Kirtan	
2010	Siddharth S. Gosavi	Fine Art	
2010	Rajdeep Naik	Drama	
2011	Shilpa Suresh Duble Parab	Music	
2011	Sonia Shirsat	Music	
2011	Comedian Selvy	Tiatr	
2011	Manohar Bhingi	Mimicry, Theatre	
2011	Paresh Narendra Kamat	Literature	
2011	Pradeep P Naik	Painting	
2011	Damodar Vaman Chari	Bhajan/Kirtan	
2011	Marianela Philgina Mascarenhas Dias	Folk Art	
2012	Neville Pereira	Music	
2012	Sharad S. Mathkar	Music	
2012	Sidhanath Buyao	Music	
2012	Sonia Rodrigues Sabharwal	Painting	
2012	Sushant Khedekar	Craft	
2012	Rajay Pawar	Literature	
2012	Romaldina Joana Fernandes (Roma)	Tiatr	
2012	Nilesh Mahale	Drama	
2013	Ramnath Gawade	Literature	
2013	Mukesh Ghatwal	Music	
2013	Aarti Nayak	Music	
2013	Olavo Rodrigues	Music	
2013	Carmina Terezinha Barbosa	Tiatr	
2013	Ghanshyam Chari	Tiatr	
2013	Rajan Shripad Fulari	Painting	
2013	Gopinath Vishnu Gawas	Folk Art	
2014	Gauri Nayak Bhat	Music	
2014	Vishnu Shirodkar	Music	
2014	Roque Lazarus	Western Music	
2014	Reagan D'souza (Jr. Reagon)	Tiatr	
2014	Hanumant Chopdekar	Literature	
2014	Guadalupe Dias	Literature	
2014	Santosh Anand Morajkar	Fine Art	
2014	Sanjay Chandrakant Chari	Bhajan	
2015	Dayanidhesh Kosambe	Music	
2015	Elick Vaz	Music	
2015	Eknath Naik	Drama	
2015	Franky Gonsalves	Tiatr	
2015	Ajay/Appa Buva	Literature	
2015	Hitesh Pankar	Fine Art	
2015	Vitthal P. Shirodkar	Bhajan	
2015	Suresh Gaude	Folk Art	
2016	Vishnu alias Ajay Anand Naik	Music	
2016	Swapnesh H. Vaigankar	Fine Art	
2016	Pandurang F. Gaonkar	Literature	
2016	Aadhi Vishal	Fine Art	
2016	Antonieta D'Melo	Tiatr	
2016	Frederika Menezes	Literature	
2016	Prashant Madhukar Satarkar	Drama	
2016	Prahlad Raghuvir Gawas	Music-Bhajan	
2017	Mayuresh D.Vast	Music	
2017	Dayaram B. Padloskar	Literature	
2017	Jessica J. Gomes	Tiatr	
2017	Sucheta Narvekar	Drama	
2017	Sachin Naik	Fine Art	
2017	Chetan V. Khedekar	Folk Art	
2018	Quennie Fernandes	Music	
2018	Samiksha R. Desai	Drama	
2018	Marcos Gonsalves	Literature	
2018	Surjit Thali	Music	
2018	Tulshidas Dhonshikar	Drama	
2018	Vitesh Naik	Painting	
2018	Sapna Kocharekar Naik	Dance	
2018	Devendra M. Akarkar	Folk Art	
2018	Sebastiao Willy Silveira	Folk Art	
2018	Janaki R. Parab	Foll Art	
2018	Vithal Gawas	Bhajan	
2019	Sampada Kunkoliekar	Literature	
2019	Prashanti Haresh Mangaonkar	Literature	
2019	Samradni Shelar-Aeer	Music	
2019	Elvis Mascarenhas	Western Music	
2019	Praveen Gajanan Naik	Painting	
2019	Hariprasad Bhadu Sawant	Folk Art	
2019	Avinas Babuso Gaude	Folk Art	
2019	Gauresh Subhash Gaude	Folk Art	
2019	Antonet de Sousa	Tiatr	
2019	Ivy Pereira	Tiatr	
2019	Gangaram(satish) R. Narvekar	Drama	
2019	Aarti Deepak Gaude	Drama	
2019	Siddhi Upadhye	Drama	
2021	Myron Barreto	Drama	
2021	Samir Vaigankar	Music	
2021	Siddhi Surlakar alias Pilgaonkar	Music	
2021	Vanita Kurtikar	Theatre	
2021	Vishal Gawas	Theatre	
2021	Ageema Fernandes	Tiatr	
2021	Sandesh Naik	Fine Art	
2021	Rajtilak Naik	Fine Arts/Photography	
2021	Premnath Kerkar	Folk	
2022	Yatin U. Shenvi Talaulikar	Music	
2022	Aarti Deepak Gaude	Drama	
2022	Meena Helon Goes	Tiatr	
2022	Mahesh A. Satarkar	Folk Art	
2022	Vasudev Shetye	Fine Art	
2022	Ganesh Shankar Shetkar	Creative Photography	
