= Tilak Smarak Ranga Mandir =

Theatre hall in Pune, Maharashtra

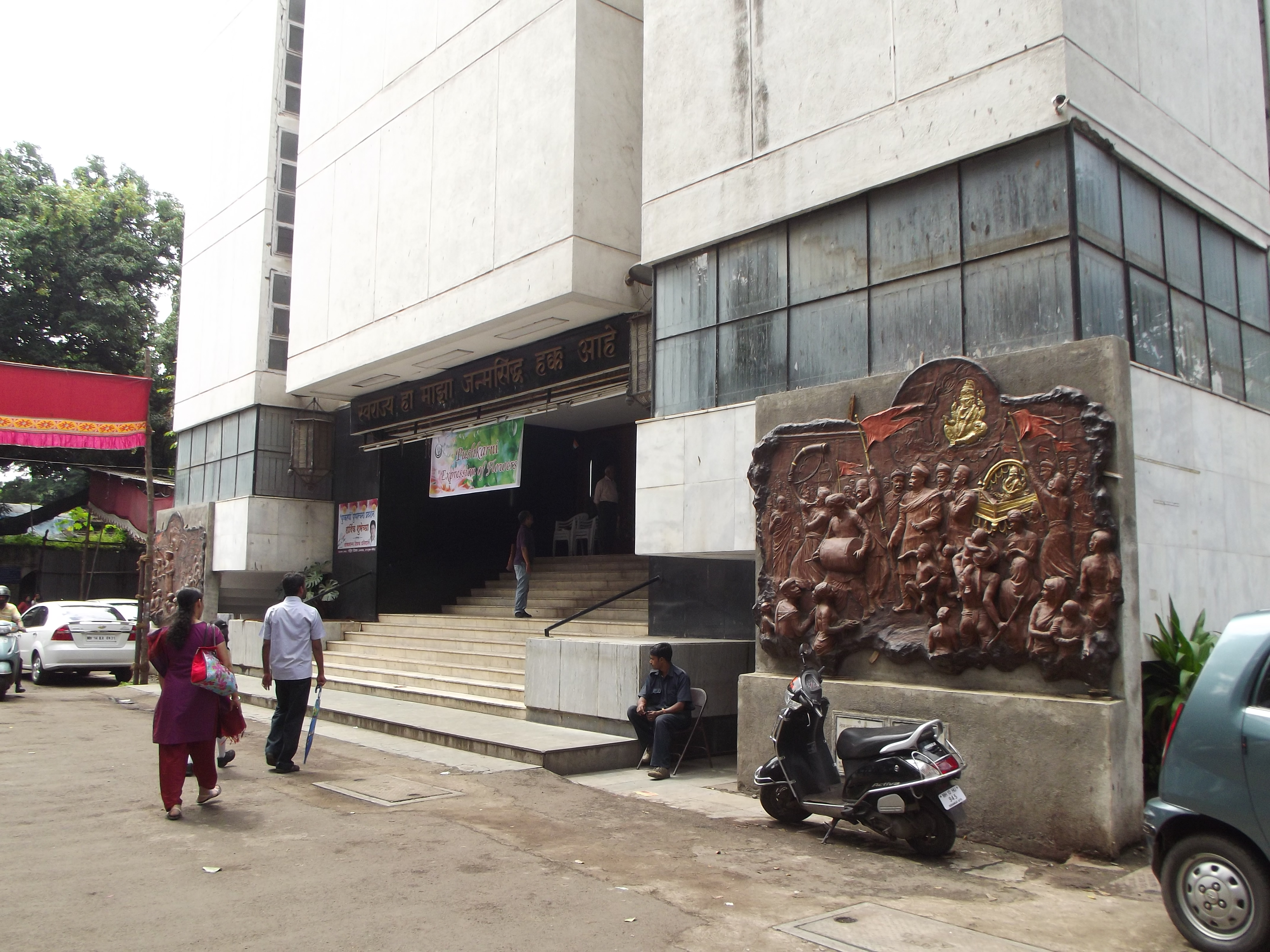
Tilak Smarak Mandir, Pune

Tilak Smarak Ranga Mandir is a theatre auditorium and exhibition hall located in Pune, India. The theatre is dedicated to the noted Indian nationalist and social reformer Bal Gangadhar Tilak. The auditorium has a series of murals, created by Gopal Deuskar, which showcase important events in the life of Tilak.
