= Sonia Shirsat =

Indian Fado singer

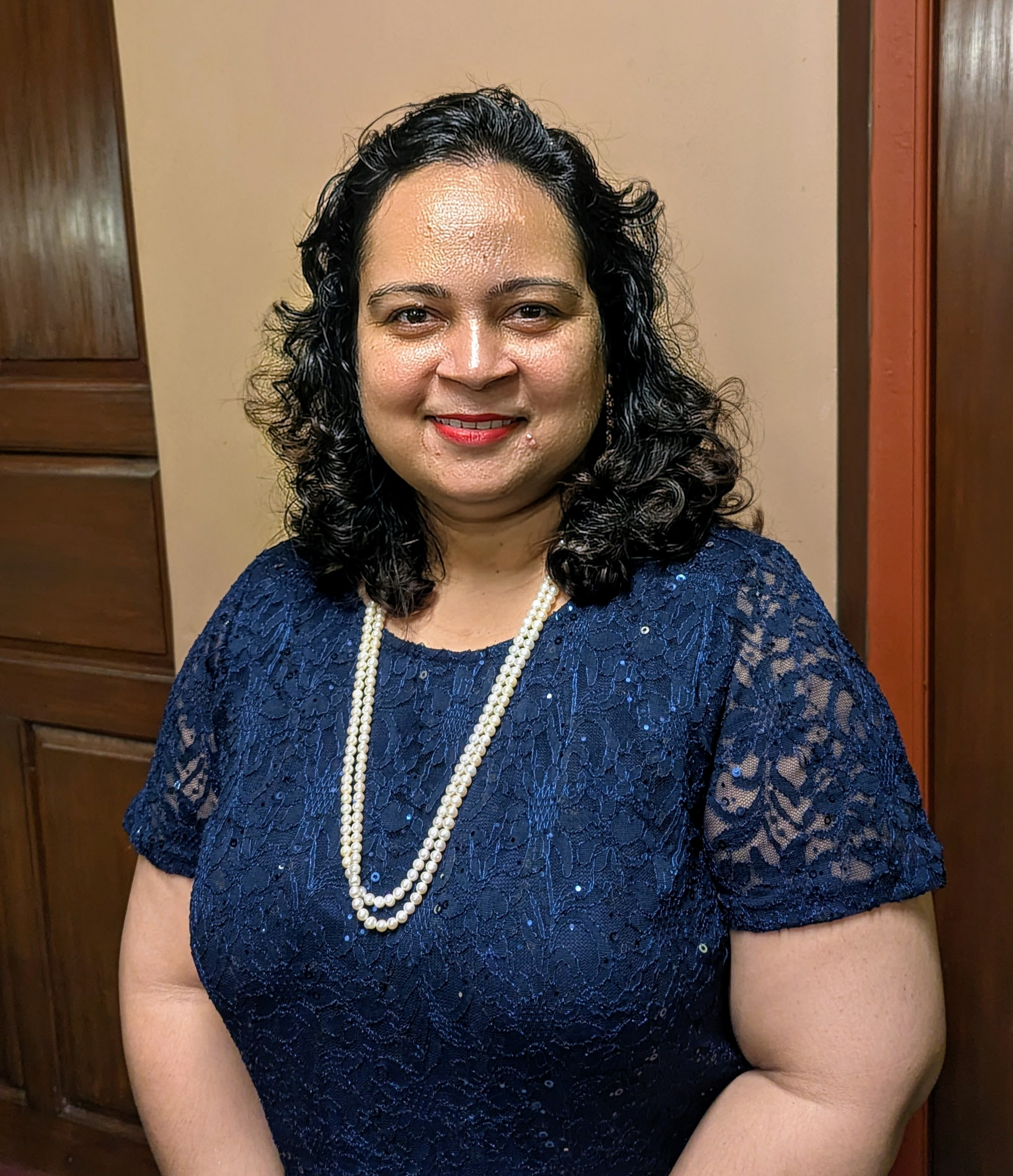
- Shirsat in 2025
- Born: 1980 (age 45–46); Ponda, Goa, India
- Occupations: Singer; professor
- Awards: Yuva Srujan Puraskar (2011)
- Musical career
- Genre: Fado
- Instrument: Vocals
- Years active: 2003–present

Sonia Shirsat (born 1980) is an Indian fadista. Referred to as the "ambassador of Goan music to the world" she has performed across India and the world and often during cultural and music events in Goa. She has sung in 15 different languages Shirsat has been promoting Fado in Goa, by holding training and introductory classes to this form of music at various parts of the region.

== Early life ==
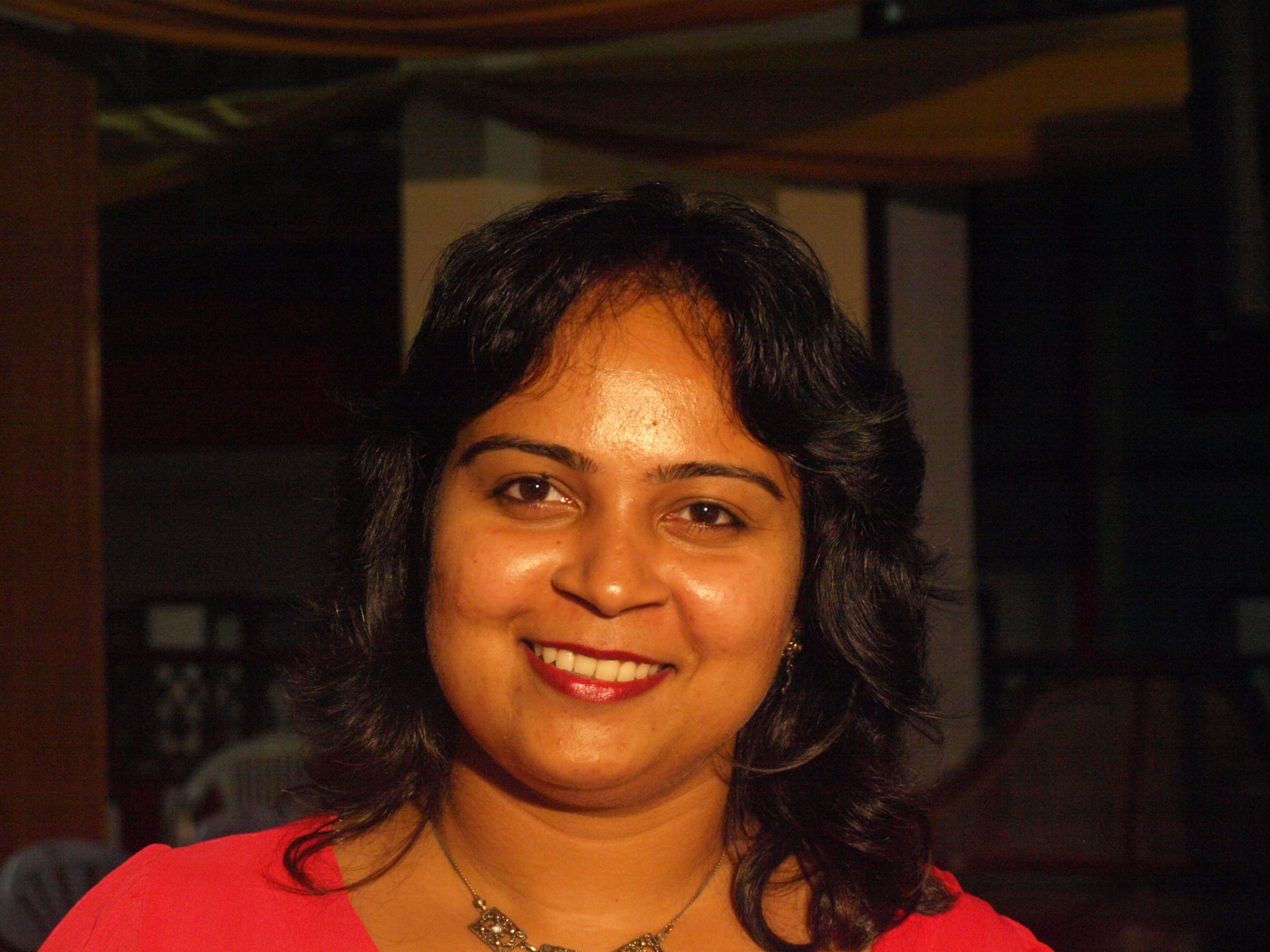
Sonia Shirsat, the Fado singer from Goa, 2009

In her earlier day job, Shirsat was a lecturer of law. She "bagged an international award for her speaking skills, much before she started singing professionally". She holds an LL.M (Master's in Law) degree. She started singing as a hobby, and has been a professional singer since about 1999. Her mother is Roman Catholic and her father, a Hindu.

== Getting into Fado ==
Shirsat is one of the few from India to excel in the Fado, a music genre which can be traced to the 1820s in Portugal or earlier. She credits Portuguese guitarist Antonio Chainho, who was offering guitar training in Goa some years ago, for introducing her to it. At the end of the workshop conducted by him, there was a search for someone to sing the Fado. Shirsat's voice was found to have "fitted perfectly for the song", and thus began her "tryst with the genre", she says. In five years time, she performed at her first-ever solo concert, in Portugal, 2008.

As of 2016, she has performed in Goa, Daman, Bangalore, Mumbai, Delhi, Kolkata, Luxembourg, Macau, Kuwait, France, Singapore, Hawaii, Nepal, Canada, London, Dubai, Muscat, Lisbon and Qatar. She has also performed in California, Toronto, Paris, Porto, Oeiras and Seoul.

Shirsat has also performed along with some of the prominent names from the world of Fado, including Katia Guerreiro, Maria Ana Bobone, Raquel Tavares, Rao Kyao, Carlos do Carmo, Argentina Santos, Miguel Capucho, Ricardo Rocha and Antonio Chainho. She has performed on a number of occasions on a number of Portugal-based TV channels, including in live performances on RTPI, Sociedade Independente de Comunicação and Televisão Independente.

In Goa, she is known for her live performances at a number of venues, among these the Art Chamber at Calangute.

== Theatrical career ==
In September 2012, Shirsat made her debut in Konkani tiatr as a singer in Sammy Tavares's production Apleam Bhurguem Sangatak (With Their Children).

== Other achievements ==
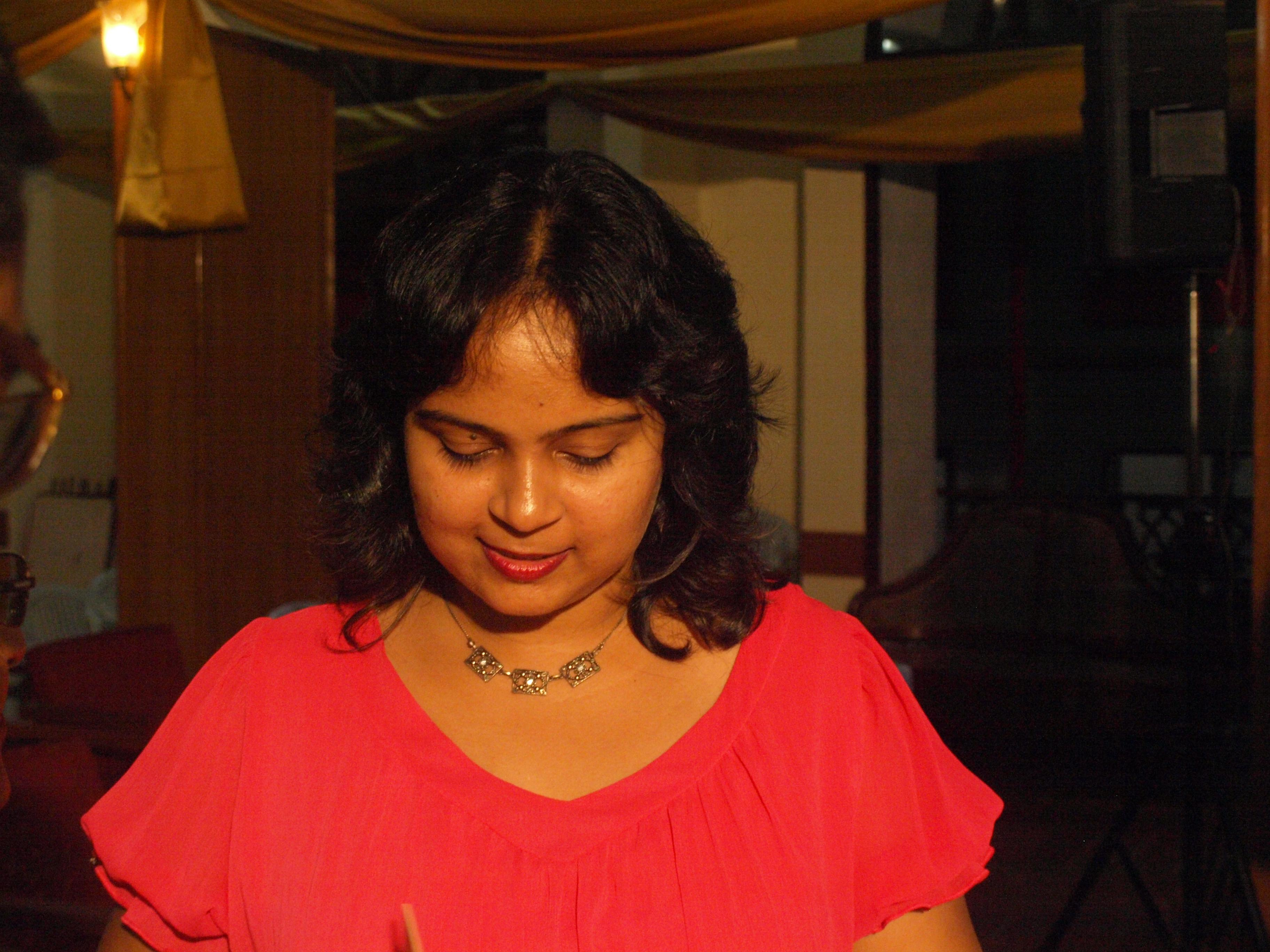
Sonia Shirsat, the Fado singer from Goa, 2009.

Shirsat is the only professional Fadista (Fado singer) in the Indian Subcontinent, a form she has performed since 2003. She also conducts workshops and gives talks on this semi-classical genre of music called the Fado. Apart from the Portuguese Fado, Shirsat is also known for performing Traditional and Pop music from Goa.

== Awards ==
Shirsat has won the 2016 April: Best Singer (Female) Award from the Tiatr Academy of Goa. She was also conferred the Ustad Bismillah Khan Yuva Puraskar 2016 in the category of Traditional Music which is awarded by the Sangeet Natak Akademi, Ministry of Culture, Government of India. She attained the Yuva Srujan Puraskar 2011, the highest Award in the cultural field given by the Govt of Goa in Youth Category.

== Media comments ==
The Hindu newspaper said of her: "Shirsat is a prodigious singer with a versatile voice. Rated as the best Fadista in India of all time, the talented singer has toured across the globe."

== Discography ==
- 2006: Selected for Fado scholarship in Portugal.
- Saudades de Fado, 2010
- March 2010: Release in Lisbon of album 'Lisgoa' which Shirsat has performed in with Antonio Chainho
- Ugddas, 2013. This collection comprises cover versions of prominent musicians such as Alfred Rose, Chris Perry, Frank Fernand, Wilfy Remembus, among others. Shirsat has also been working on Konkani music in recent times.
- Melodious Goa, 2014
- Saudades de Fado II, 2016
- August 2016: Fado in the city (performance)
