= Sadu (musician) =

Indi-pop musician

Sadasivan KM Nambisan a.k.a. Sadu is a Indi-pop singer, music composer, lyricist, and producer.

He was a founder member of the 1990s pop and rock band, The Aryans, known for their romantic songs ‘Aankhon mein tera hi chehra’ and ‘Ye hawa’.

Sadu released his song ‘Hor Kinne Suboot’ in Feb, 2020, and 'Yakeen' in 2022.
