= Lawry Travasso =

Indian singer and playwright (born 1971)

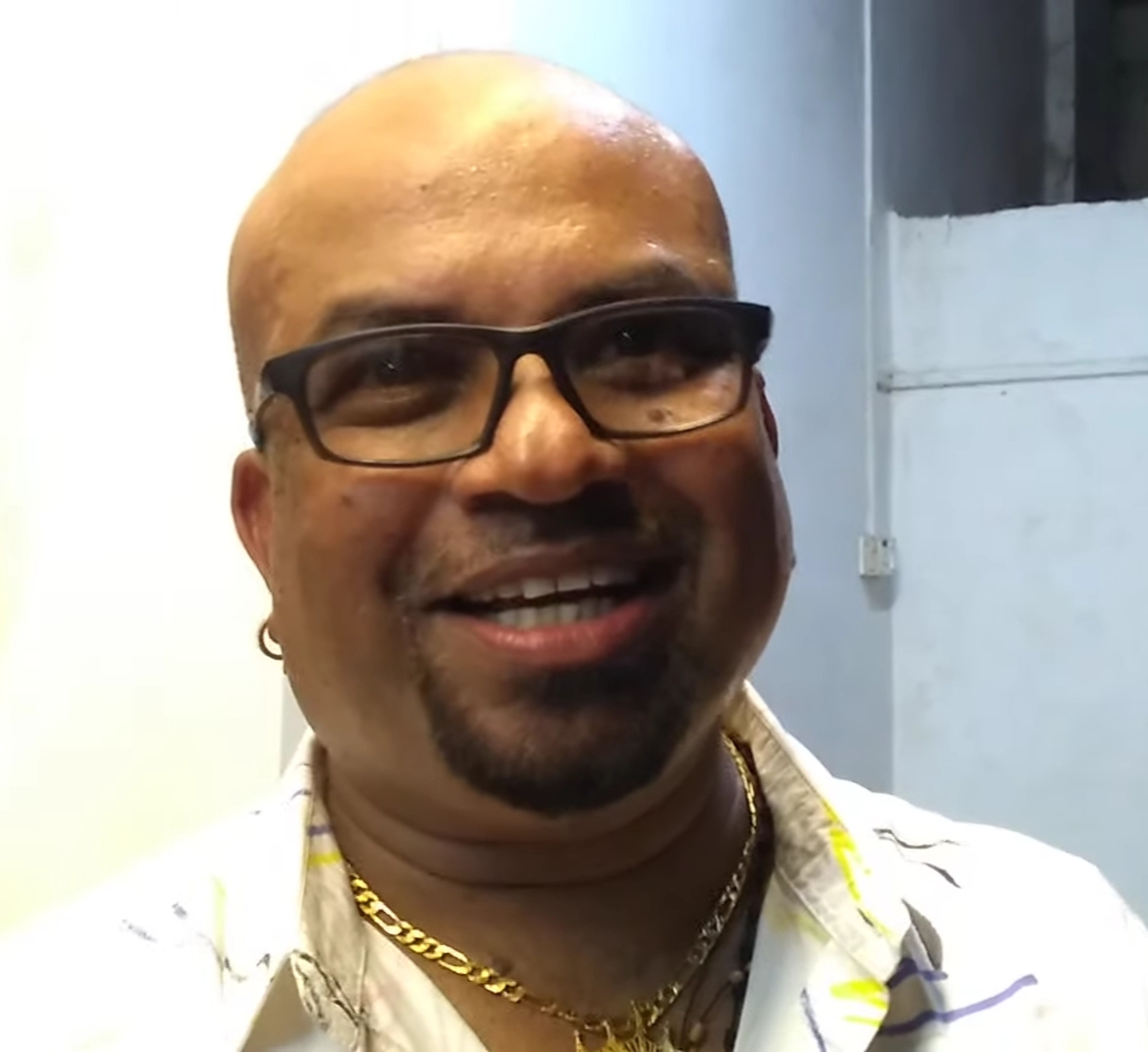
- Travasso at a tiatr production, 2023
- Born: Lourenco Sopriano Cardo Travasso; 16 September 1971 (age 54); Quepem, Goa, India
- Other names: Lourensso Travasso; Lawrence S. Travasso
- Occupations: Singer; playwright; director; theatrical producer; actor
- Years active: 1990s–present
- Spouse: Jenny Travasso (m. 1992; div. 2005)
- Awards: Yuva Srujan Puraskar
- Website: facebook.com/lavin.pintra

Lourenco Sopriano Cardo "Lawry" Travasso (born 16 September 1971) is an Indian singer, playwright, theatre director, theatrical producer, and actor known for his work in Konkani films and tiatr productions.

== Early life ==
His father was a professional driver who also participated in local streetside plays (khells) and had a talent for singing and composing songs. Travasso's mother was also musically inclined, and her brother played the trumpet. Growing up, Travasso was exposed to his father's performances on stage, which inspired him to learn and sing his songs at home.

== Career ==
At the age of 12, Travasso embarked on his musical journey when his father, João, composed a duet for them to perform in a tiatr production known as Sangath. This event, organized by the local boys in their village, showcased Travasso's emerging talent as a singer. Encouraged by his success, his father enrolled him in the Margao music school to receive formal training in keyboard playing. Demonstrating skill, Travasso honed his keyboard abilities and developed a proficiency in playing the instrument. By the time he turned 16, he founded his own beat band called Co-ordinator, which marked the beginning of his professional musical career. Subsequently, he joined other bands such as Dimension and Littles. Throughout his musical journey, Travasso predominantly performed English songs with occasional renditions of Konkani songs. It was during a performance with the band Littles that Travasso caught the attention of John Claro, who recognized his talent and invited him to participate in the tiatr production titled Rostadak Vostad. This marked Travasso's inaugural experience in the realm of professional tiatr, where he delivered a comedic song to acclaim.

Following this achievement, Travasso received an invitation from William de Curtorim to showcase his comedic prowess in the tiatr production Ankwarponn Sonsunk Zaina. Travasso's comedic performances were warmly embraced by audiences, resulting in a series of successful shows, totaling approximately 30 to 35 performances. As Travasso's reputation as a comedy singer grew, he also ventured into comedic acting, including collaborations with C. D'Silva. However, a pivotal moment came when Mariano Fernandes of Vasco invited Travasso to participate in his tiatr production titled Devachem Naum Vhodd Zaum. It was during this production that Travasso recognized the audience's appreciation for his sincere solo performances rather than his comedic deliveries. Consequently, he made a conscious decision to transition exclusively to delivering heartfelt solos, leaving behind comedy singing and acting. In addition to his performances, Travasso has displayed his creative talents as a writer. By 2018, he had written six non-stop shows, including Respeid, Tallio Marat, Burso, Naginn, Daag, and Aiz Thaun Tujem.

Travasso has released more than 60 audio albums as of 2013. Writer Daniel F. de Souza recognizes Travasso's significant standing and influence in Konkani music. As of 2013, While Travasso has dabbled in amateur tiatr production, his venture into the professional realm as a writer-director is relatively recent. In 2012, he made his debut as a professional writer-director with his first tiatr titled Kagtachim Fulam. This production proved to be a success, garnering 38 shows during its initial run. Encouraged by this achievement, Travasso followed up with his second professional tiatr, Pisuddlelim Fulam, which premiered on 14 February. The premiere took place in Canacona, followed by subsequent performances at Ravindra Bhavan in Margao and Kala Academy in Panjim on 3 March. Travasso expressed satisfaction with the outcome of Pisuddlelim Fulam. He revealed that he had already secured 53 confirmed show dates, with the potential for additional bookings that could exceed 60 shows. The play tackles important societal issues, shedding light on the consequences of abortion and highlighting the pitfalls of blind faith in fake devotions and rituals. Daniel F. de Souza highlights Travasso's potential and skill as a writer-director, emphasizing that the success of his tiatrs should be measured by the reception from audiences, rather than the sheer number of shows performed.

In March 2017, Travasso premiered his fifth tiatr production, Mogachim Fullam (Flowers of Love), which centered around a Lenten theme. This tiatr was part of a series, with his previous works including Kagtachim Fullam (Paper Flowers), Pisudelelim Fullam (Torn Flowers), Baulelim Fullam (Wilted Flowers), Sandlelim Fullam (Lost Flowers), and Apurbaechim Fullam (Flowers of Affection). Travasso is known for often integrating the theme of "flowers" into the titles of his tiatrs, forming the 'Fullam' series. The staging of Mogachim Fullam in Varca the following month garnered acclaim from the audience. Within the production, Travasso made a brief appearance in a performance as a character who had become mentally unwell after losing his wife. In the role, he sought comfort from a priest, sharing the pain he felt due to societal pressure about his wife's infertility. Additionally, Travasso demonstrated his range by performing alone and joining a comedy quartet with Bryan, Marcus, and Xavier, depicting the struggles of migrants adapting to life in Goa.

In July 2018, Travasso collaborated with Tina for her inaugural audio album, Poilo Mog, featuring a collection of ten songs, including solos and duets. One of Travasso's contributions was the song "Novim Bhurgim," which conveyed a crucial message about the aspirations of aspiring tiatr performers and the support required to nurture emerging talents within the Konkani stage. Travasso expressed his belief that young individuals dreaming of success in the tiatr industry deserved appreciation and encouragement. He shed light on the challenges faced by amateurs when making their debut as singers or actors, often encountering criticism until they inevitably withdraw. Travasso called upon fellow tiatrists to extend their support, emphasizing the importance of aiding these newcomers to ensure the preservation of the Konkani language in tiatr performances.

On 9 November 2018, Travasso was featured as singer in the Konkani DVD release Sopon Zalem Purem by Bryan Fernandes, under the banner of Sunshine Production, which also featured Bollywood singer Usha Uthup.

In May 2022, Travasso was featured as a solo singer in Comedian Ambe's tiatr, Kuddo, Mono vo Bhero, besides Marcus Vaz, Agusto de Calangute, Reema and Ofelia, Rizton, Agnelo, and Peter de Arambol.

In September 2022, Travasso was featured as a solo singer in Pierson D’Costa's maiden tiatr Tunch Chintun Poi. Travasso along with Tony de Ribandar paid tribute to fellow tiatrist Mario Menezes through their songs.

In July 2023, Travasso played a supporting role in Sammy Tavares' tiatr, Tumich Mhaka Sangat. He also delivered a solo performance alongside Sammy Tavares and Peter de Arambol. The other singers included Joylita, Antonette de Maina, Roma, Ulhas Tari, Saby de Divar, Richard and Rizton.

== Personal life ==
On 19 September 1992, Travasso's marriage ceremony took place at Holy Cross Church in Quepem, he was 21, and his partner Jenny Paula Travasso (née Dias), was 26. Jenny, originally from Assolna, is known in the Konkani theatrical community as a playwright under the stage name Jenny de Germany. The couple had previously completed their civil marriage registration in Quepem two days prior to the church ceremony. However, their marital journey encountered obstacles, and on 7 July 2005, the couple filed for divorce in Margao. Subsequently, their divorce was officially concluded on 9 November of the same year.

=== The Arambol incident ===
During a theatrical performance of William de Curtorim's tiatr in Curtorim, Travasso and his fellow troupe members concluded their late-night activities and embarked on a journey back to Margao via bus. Exhausted, Travasso succumbed to slumber during the trip. While in this state, an announcement was made on the bus regarding the next day's performance location, Arambol, possibly accompanied by the designated time. Half-asleep, Travasso misinterpreted "Arambol" as "Tilamoll" and, in response, exclaimed, "I'll come direct," assuming that since he resided in Quepem, he could proceed directly to the venue. The following day, Travasso arrived at Tilamoll, Quepem for the tiatr performance, only to find the absence of both individuals and an expected performance venue. Perplexed by the discrepancy, he decided to wait, hopeful that someone would eventually arrive. However, as time passed and no one appeared, Travasso sought clarification from the parish priest of Tillamol Church. The priest informed him that no tiatr was scheduled in Tillamol but rather in Arambol.

Using the priest's phone, Travasso contacted a neighbor of William, as William did not possess a telephone in his residence at that time. The neighbor provided Travasso with the information that the tiatr was indeed taking place in Arambol and had commenced at 8 p.m. Recognizing the urgency, Travasso hastily boarded a series of buses, ultimately arriving in Arambol at 11 p.m. that day. By the time he reached the venue, another individual had assumed Travasso's role, and the tiatr was already in progress. However, Travasso managed to participate by performing a solo song before the conclusion of the event.

=== Personal views ===
Travasso has traveled around the world as a tiatrist with Sonia Shirsat, with whom he has maintained a friendship since the 2000s. In an interview on the Candid with Candida show by Prudent Media in March 2022, Travasso expressed his support for the Indian National Congress Party and revealed that he had voted for them in the 2022 Goa Legislative Assembly election. He defended the involvement of artists in politics, countering the notion that they should refrain from such engagement due to public opinion. Travasso emphasized the importance of development in his constituency and the role artists can play in advocating for the concerns of the public. Travasso draws inspiration from the Konkani singer Alfred Rose, whom he considers his role model. Reflecting on the title "New Melody King" associated with his name, Travasso expressed modesty, asserting that Alfred Rose, known as "The Melody King of Goa," holds an unparalleled status. He personally avoids using the title in his work, and believes it has been embraced by only a minority of individuals, such as media professionals.

Travasso has openly acknowledged the challenges of being a tiatrist, emphasizing the demanding nature of the profession. During his early years, Travasso faced limited support from his family and encountered numerous rejections in singing competitions due to issues with timing and vocal abilities. Even in Christmas competitions, he faced criticism from the public. Recognition for his talent began to emerge only in the late-2000s. Travasso clarified that shaving his head is a deliberate choice, unrelated to baldness, as he can grow hair naturally. In addition to his musical pursuits, Travasso is a photographer, videographer, and football player. He also enjoys fishing near his residence in Quepem.

== Selected stage works ==
Year	Title	Role	Notes	Ref
c. 1983	Sangath	Singer	Debut as child artiste	
1990s	Rostadak Ostad	Singer	Professional debut	
	Ankwarponn Sonsunk Zaina	Singer		
	Devachem Naum Vhodd Zaum	Singer		
2012	Kagtachim Fulam	Singer	Also writer/director	
