= Mount Mary's Higher Secondary School =

Co-educational higher secondary school in Goa, India

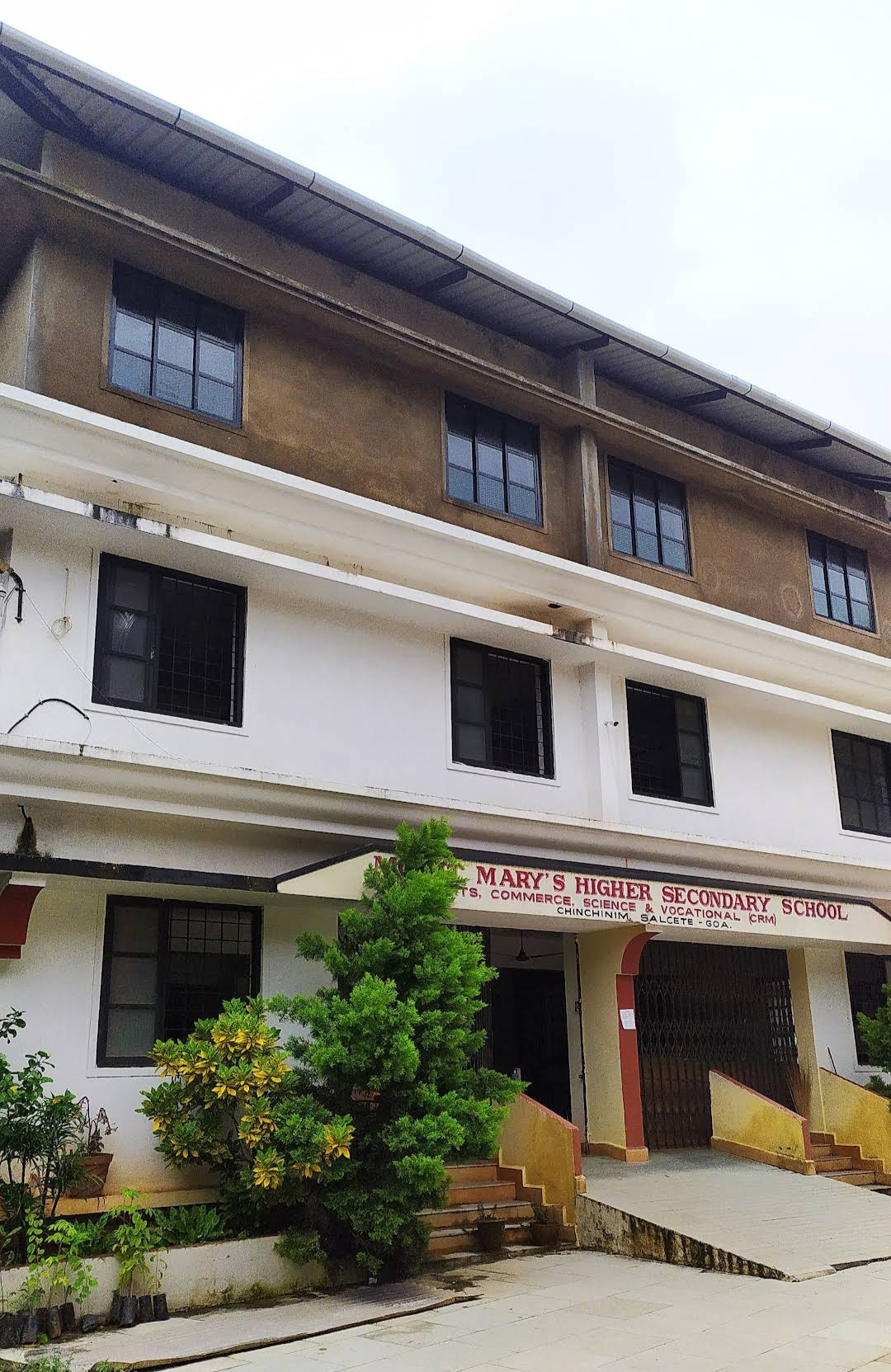
- Façade of the school, 2020

Location
- Behind Our Lady of Hope Church, Chinchinim, Goa, India; 403715
- Coordinates: 15.212068°N 73.978441°E

Information
- Type: Private aided higher secondary school
- Motto: Educate & Illuminate
- Religious affiliation: Catholicism
- Denomination: Jesuits
- Patron saint: Our Lady of Hope (Note: the school's patron is Our Lady of Hope, since its parent church is Our Lady of Hope Church, Chinchinim as per)
- Established: 1996; 30 years ago
- School board: Goa Board of Secondary and Higher Secondary Education, Porvorim
- School code: 30020106006 (Note: Unified District Information System for Education (UDISE) code)
- Manager: Fr. Alex John D’souza
- Principal: Melba Vas
- Staff: 37
- Teaching staff: 26
- Grades: 11th to 12th
- Gender: Co-educational
- Age range: 16–18
- Classes offered: Science; Commerce; Arts; Vocational (CRM) (Note: stands for catering and restaurant management.)
- Language: English
- Campus type: Rural
- Sports: Football
- Feeder to: Mount Mary's High School, Chinchinim, Goa, India
- Affiliations: Goa Board of Secondary and Higher Secondary Education; Department of Education, Goa
- Website: mountmaryhss.com
- Last updated: 30 July 2023

Mount Mary's Higher Secondary School is a private aided co-educational higher secondary school located within Chinchinim in the Indian coastal state of Goa. It was established in 1996 and is affiliated to Department of Education, Goa and Goa Board of Secondary and Higher Secondary Education. The school also serves as a sub-centre of the Navelim main centre in the HSSC exams.

== Key people ==
=== Managers ===
Ordinal	Officeholder	Term start	Term end	Time in office
1	Fr. Antonio Francisco de Santa Rita Ataide	1 June 1996	1 June 1998	2 years
2	Fr. Jorge Pazzi Fernandes	1 January 1998	1 January 2005	7 years
3	Fr. Geraldo Aleixo Antonio da Costa	1 January 2005	1 June 2007	2 years and 5 months
4	Fr. J Armando A C da Gama e Souza	1 June 2007	??	??
5	Fr. Jose Antonio da Costa	1 June 2014 (Note: announcement was made in the month of May, the term of catholic priests usually start in June as it did in this case.)	9 May 2021	6 years 11 months 9 days
6	Fr. Alex John D’souza	9 May 2021	incumbent	2 years and counting

=== Principals ===
Ordinal	Officeholder	Term start	Term end	Time in office
1	Trevor Vaz Barretto	15 May 2013	3 January 2022	8 years, 7 months and 20 days
2	Melba Vas	??	incumbent	??

== Infrastructure ==
On 2 February 2019, South Zilla Panchayat proposed works of over ₹2 crore (equivalent to ₹2.5 crore or US$260,000 in 2023) to build infrastructure and improve the condition of education institutes in the district that included government schools, aided schools and private schools. Out of which ₹588,892 (equivalent to ₹730,000 or US$7,600 in 2023) was sanctioned to build a badminton court for Ameya Higher Secondary School, Curti and to construct a retaining wall at Mount Mary Higher Secondary School.

== Sports ==
The school competes at inter-school, taluka and state level football competitions. On 16 August 2013, Mount Mary's Higher Secondary School beat Bethany Convent High School, Sao Jose de Areal by a 4–2 victory via a tie-breaker to qualify in the second round of Salcete Taluka under-17 Subroto Mukherjee inter-school football tournament at Carmel college ground, Nuvem.

On 12 July 2014, Mount Mary's Higher Secondary School defeated St. Xavier's High School by a 3–1 victory via a tie-breaker in the Salcete Taluka under-17 Subroto Mukerjee inter-school football tournament which was organized by Directorate of Sports And Youth Affairs (DYSA) at Mandopa ground, Navelim. The tournament was participated by over 35 schools and higher secondary schools from all over the state.

On 2 October 2014, Mount Mary's Higher Secondary School were among the 8 schools that managed to win two out of their three games in the under-19 all-Goa inter-higher secondary school football league, organized by DSYA in association with Goa Football Association and Goa Football Development Council. They also managed to tie against Gauncar Higher Secondary School, Raia in a goalless match. The tournament ended with Alston Mendes being the highest scorer of the tournament.

On 17 December 2015, Mount Mary's Higher Secondary and High School, Chinchinim organised the match to commemorate and honour St.Joseph Vaz between Rosary High School, Navelim and St.Xaviers High School, Velim where the latter lost by a 2–1 defeat in All Goa Inter-School Under 17 Invitational Football Tournament held at Chinchinim Church ground.

On 19 December 2015, Mount Mary's Higher Secondary and High School, Chinchinim organised the quarter-finals qualifying match between Our Lady of Health High School, Cuncolim and Our Lady of Rosary's High School, Fatorda where the latter lost by a 6–0 defeat in the St Joseph Vaz Cup 2015-16 held at Chinchinim Church ground.

On 3 May 2017, Mount Mary's Higher Secondary School lost to Rosary Higher Secondary School, Navelim by a 3–2 defeat in the OORJA-CAPFs U-19 Football Talent Hunt Tournament in the girls’ category.

On 20 July 2017, Mount Mary's Higher Secondary School lost to Our Lady of Succor High School, Nagoa-Verna by a 6–4 defeat via a tie-breaker in the Subroto Mukherjee Cup U-17 football tournament, organised at the Astro turf ground, Fatorda.

On 10 October 2017, Mount Mary's Higher Secondary School lost to Rosary Higher Secondary School, Navelim by a 6–0 defeat in the senior boys league match of the Reliance Foundation Youth Sports football tournament, at the Ambelim football ground.

On 16 August 2019, Mount Mary's Higher Secondary School beat Navy Children Higher Secondary School, Vasco by a 3–0 victory of the U-19 boys zone inter-higher secondary school football tournament, which was organised by DSYA, at Astroturf ground, Fatorda. On 27 August 2019, they lost to Fr Agnel Higher Secondary School, Verna by a 2–0 defeat in the pre-quarter finals match.

== Co-curricular activities ==
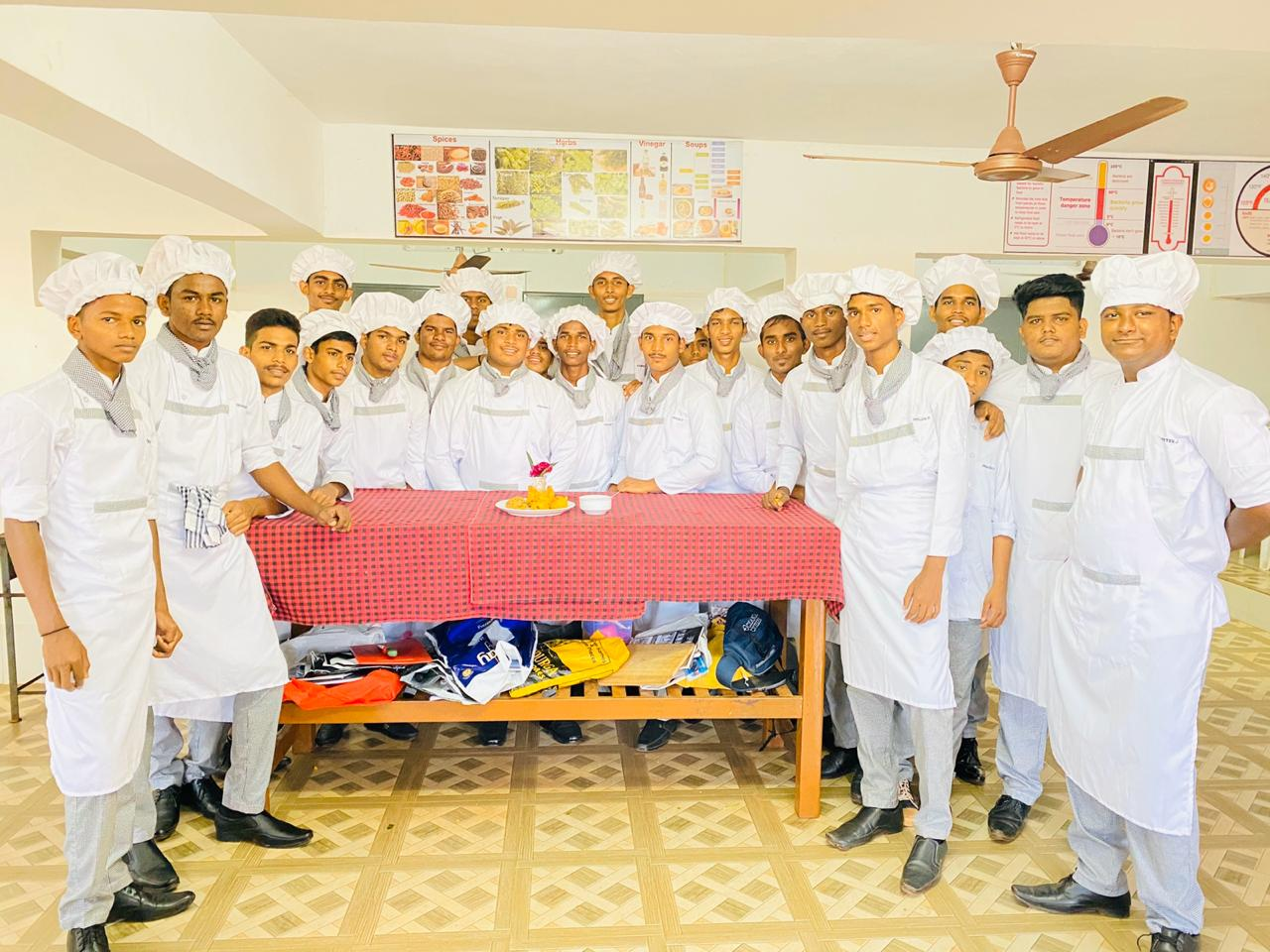
11th grade vocational students during practicals at the laboratory, 2019

On 7 August 2014, the school organised a multilingual singing competition (English, Konkani and Hindi), judged by Agustinho Themudo, Rohan Goes and Ms Wahida.

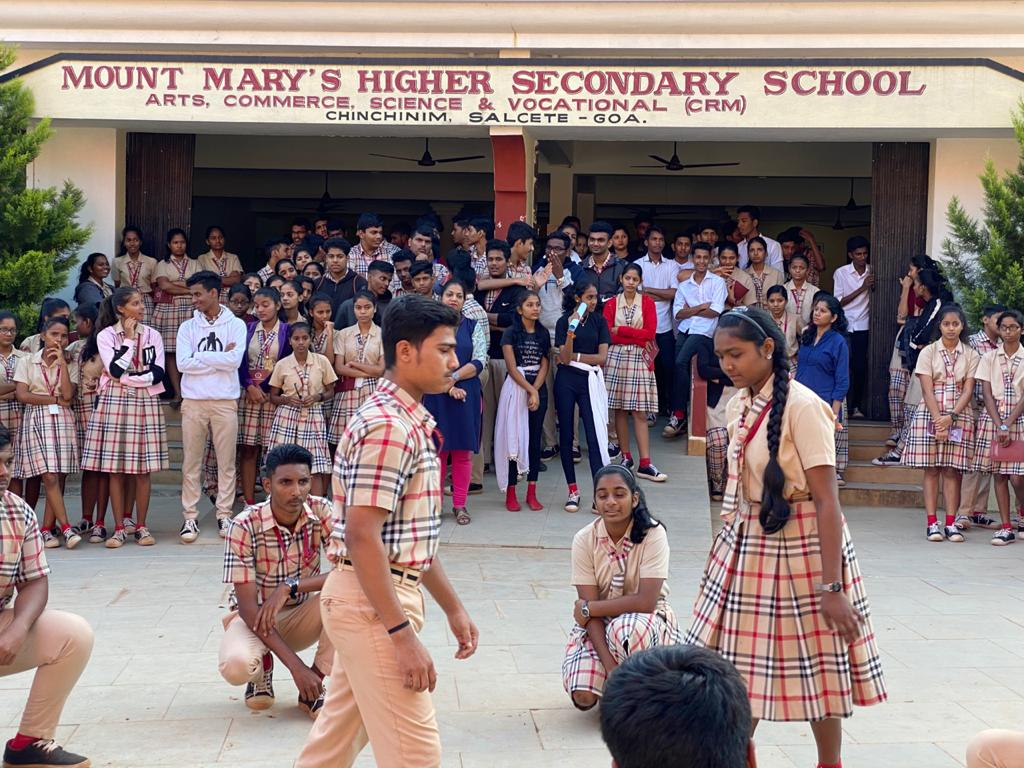
11th grade vocational students during inter-class skit competition, 2019

On 12 August 2017, the school organised a Van Mahotsav programme which was participated by Goa Forward Party leader and then-Goa Legislative Assembly cabinet minister, Vijai Sardesai in the presence of then-parish priest, Fr. Jose Antonio da Costa. Sardesai recommended that an unutilised agriculture farm could be used to promote floriculture.

== Alumni achievements ==
On 16 May 2016, Muhammad Arafat Shaik died from drowning in the river along with councillor of Margao Municipal Council, Ashlesha Naik in the Khandepar river at Vagurbem-Sonarbag. He had stood first in the state by securing 92.6% in the vocational stream (catering and restaurant management course) at the Higher Secondary School Certificate (HSSC) exams. Shaik was the son of Mount Mary's Higher Secondary School faculty member, Sadika M. Ali.

In 2020 HSSC exams, Sarah Liza Fernandes topped in Secretarial Practice in the state by securing 99% marks.

== 2021 Arson ==
On 20 February 2021, the then-principal of the school, Trevor Vaz Barretto's car was set on fire at around 2:50 am, he alleged that four miscreants came on two motorcycles and set the fire with an explosive substance.

On 24 February 2021, Fatorda police arrested a Multi Tasking Staff (MTS) member of the same school as a suspect in the case of setting fire to the vehicle. The police inspector incharge, Kapil Nayak later confirmed that there was no explosive substance used in this case, on the basis of a CCTV footage. Nayak further stated that there was no lead about the other individuals involved since the suspect didn't buldge any details. The Fire Department later concluded the investigation stating that it was a short circuit and not an attempt.

On 3 May 2021, the Higher Secondary Principals' Forum (HSPF) wrote a letter to the Superintendent of Police, South Goa (SP) pleading to take strict action against the culprits for setting on fire of Barretto's car. The forum president, Damodar Panchwadkar and executive members, Walter Cabral and Bruno Carvalho met the SP to discuss about the case. They also alleged that the police force had taken the issue for "granted" and to date no strict action has been taken against the culprits involved in the act. SP Pankaj Kumar Gupta, IPS, assured the principals that the individuals responsible for the crime are brought to light.

== Notable alumni ==
- Jr. Selvy, Indian comedian and actor

== See also ==
- List of schools in Goa
- Education in Goa
