= Comedian Myron =

Indian comedian and singer (born 2002)

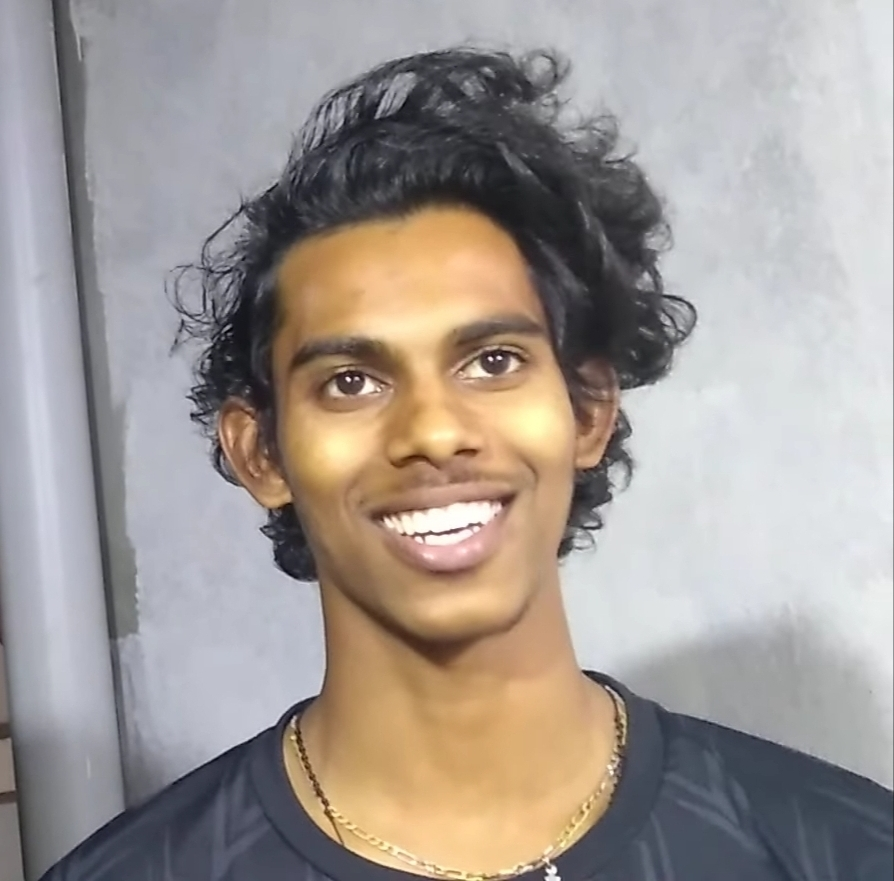
- Correia during the tiatr Inas at Candolim, 2023
- Born: Myron Shawn Correia; 24 January 2002 (age 24); Margao, Goa, India
- Other name: Jr. Selvy
- Education: St. Xavier's High School (S.S.C); Mount Mary's Higher Secondary School (HSSC)
- Occupations: Comedian; actor; singer; playwright; theatre director
- Years active: 2014–2016, 2018–2019; 2022–present
- Father: Comedian Selvy
- Website: facebook.com/myron.correia

Myron Shawn Correia (born 24 January 2002), known professionally as Comedian Myron or Jr. Selvy, is an Indian comedian, actor, singer, playwright, theatre director, and former amateur footballer known for his work in tiatr productions. The son of Konkani actor Comedian Selvy, he began his career as a singer alongside his father in khell tiatrs before transitioning into commercial tiatrs as a comedian and singer in the 2010s.

== Early life ==
Myron Shawn Correia was born on 24 January 2002 in Margao, Goa, to Konkani actor Comedian Selvy and homemaker Candolina Fernandes. He has a younger brother, Ryan. Correia received his early education at St. Xavier’s High School in Velim, Goa. Following that, he undertook studies in Catering and Restaurant Management (CRM) at Mount Mary's Higher Secondary School in Chinchinim. Subsequently, he furthered his culinary skills by completing a six-month course at Fr. Agnel Culinary and Hospitality Academy in Margao.

== Career ==
=== Football ===
In October 2017, during the Reliance Foundation Youth Sports tournament held at the Ambelim football ground, Correia scored a crucial goal in the 58th minute. This goal helped his team secure a 5–5 draw against Rosary Higher Secondary School, Navelim.

=== Khell tiatrs ===
Correia embarked on his artistic journey at a young age, starting as a singer participating in khell tiatrs during the Carnival season in Goa. His father Comedian Selvy played a significant role in shaping his early career, as they performed together and received acclaim from the public. As Correia transitioned into his late teens, approximately 17–18 years old, he ventured into the realm of commercial tiatrs and was cast by his father. This experience exposed him to his father's popularity, which sparked his own interest in the field.

=== Tiatrs ===
Initially, Correia actively contributed to his father's theatrical productions. However, his potential caught the attention of Konkani director Mario Menezes, who invited him to work on his projects. During their time together, Correia's father imparted his teachings, including specific techniques and steps, to nurture his skills. As a consequence, the public often drew comparisons between Correia and his father, leading him to adopt the stage name "Jr. Selvy."

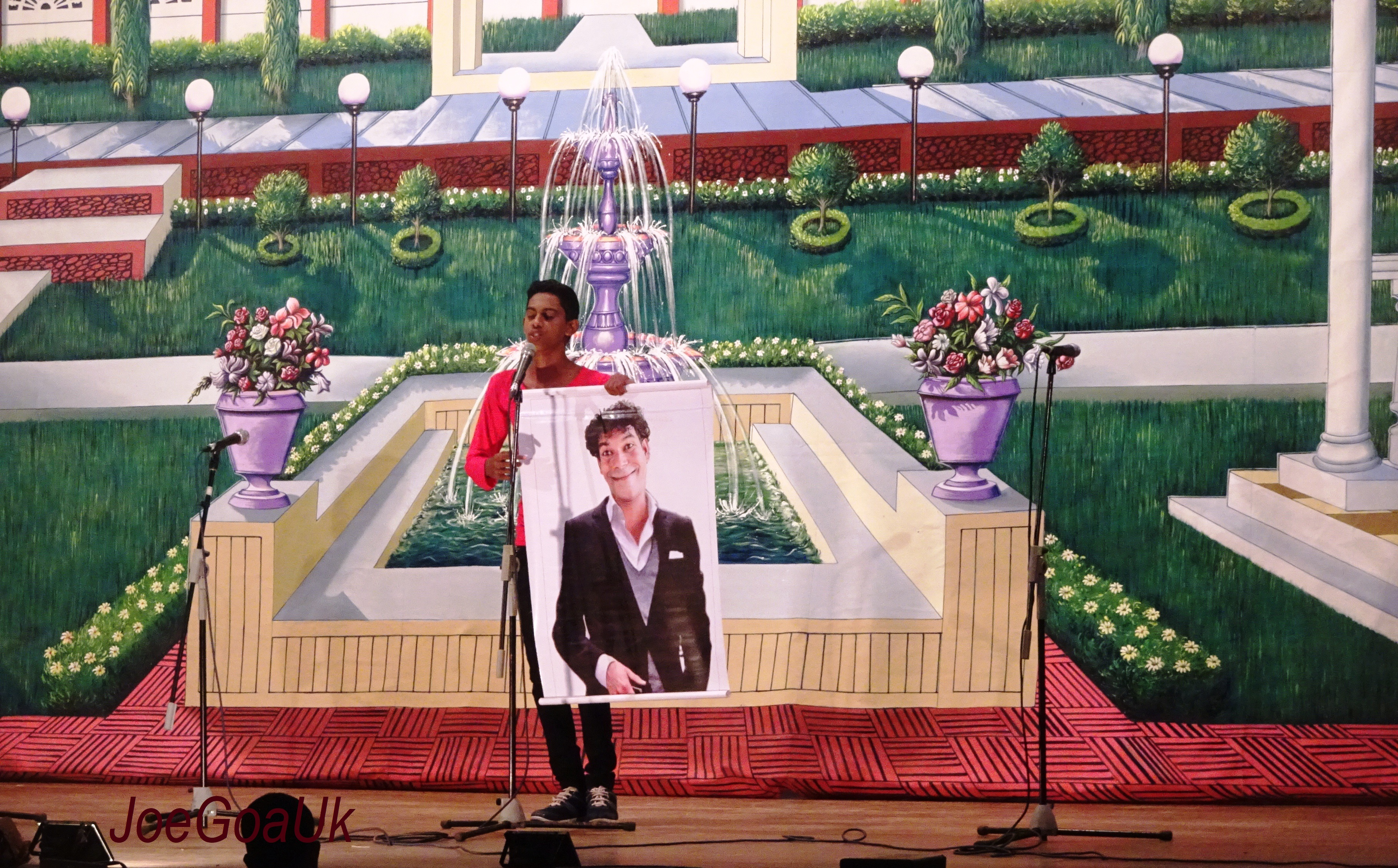
Correia during a solo performance at Mario Menezes tiatr 100%, 2018

In May 2018, Correia joined the cast of Mario Menezes' tiatr production titled 100% (Hundred Percent). This particular production garnered attention as it marked a historic moment in the tiatr industry, with a total of 25 children of prominent tiatrists in Goa taking the stage, many of whom were making their debut performances.

Following Correia's performance in Mario Menezes' tiatr 100%, he was subsequently cast in Menezes' production titled College Life. Later on, he was also selected to participate in his father's tiatr called Raza Jieta Combo Choita, where he showcased his role alongside his father, earning him further acclaim.

In November 2019, Correia secured a role in his father's tiatr Raza Jeita Combo Choita, portraying a comedic character with the support of three other comedians. JP Pereira from The Navhind Times praised Correia's entertaining solo act, noting his singing abilities. However, Pereira suggested that some adjustments should be made to the final verse of the performance.

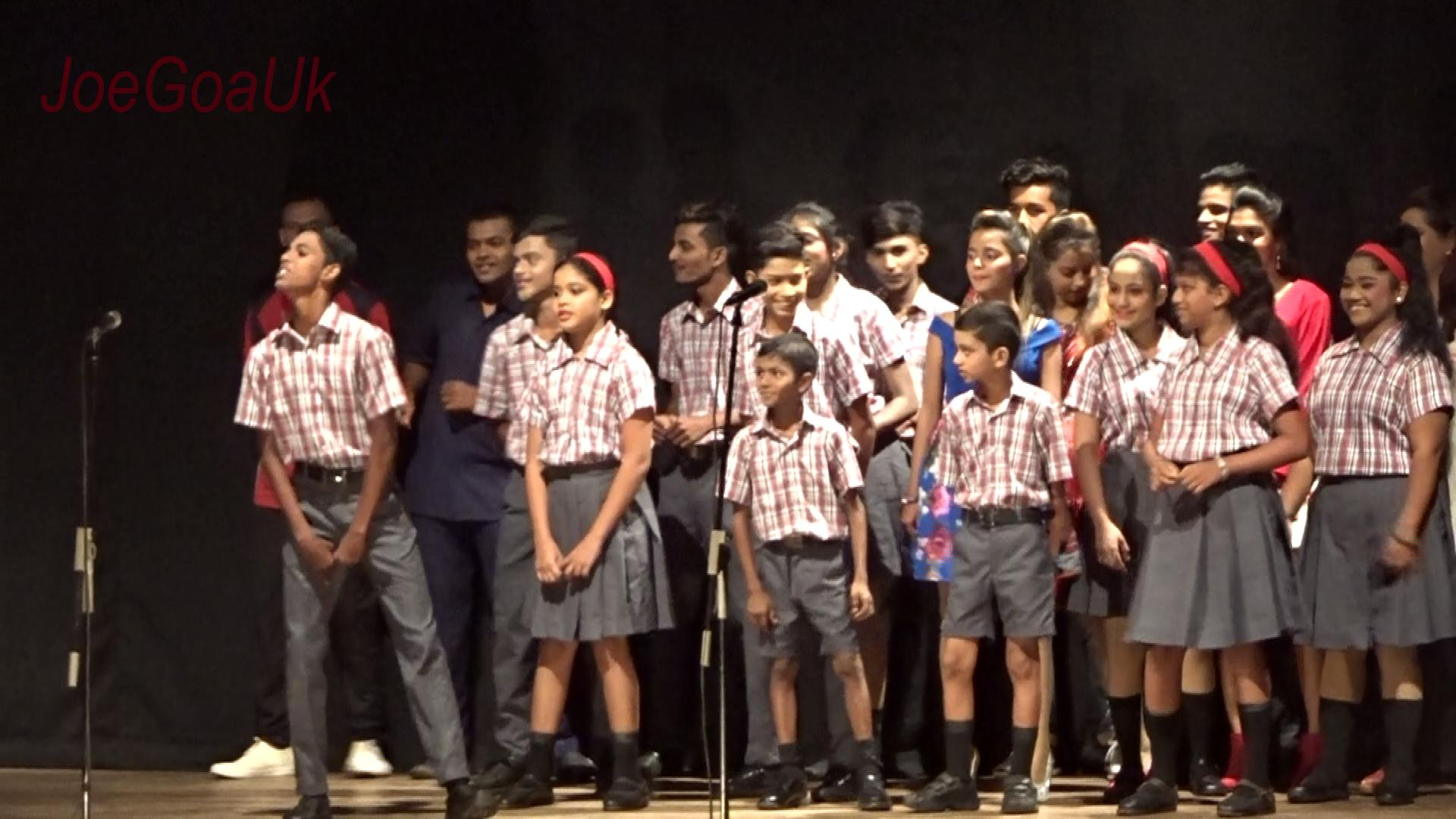
Correia (extreme left) during a performance at Menezes' tiatr 100%

In May 2022, Correia became involved in the tiatr production titled 8 Dis (8 Days) organized by his father, Comedian Selvy. During the production, Correia made contributions to the comedic aspect of the show, working alongside his father, Cassy, and Caetan. Additionally, he showcased his singing abilities through solo performances alongside Mita, Myron, Pascoal Rodrigues, and Remson. Correia also formed comedic duos with his father, Comedian Selvy, and participated in a trio with Francis and Remson.

In June 2022, a review by Mario Pires highlighted Correia's support to his father in eliciting laughter from the audience. The reviewer noted Correia's ability to effectively contribute to the comedic atmosphere of the production.

In August 2022, Correia took part in two performances of the tiatr 8 Dis (8 Days) at Ravindra Bhavan, Margao. These shows were dedicated to the memory of his father, Comedian Selvy. Reflecting on the portrayal of his father's character by Comedian Joyel, Correia expressed his satisfaction, stating that the performer's stage presence evoked memories of his father and even moved him to tears. Recognizing the fanbase his father had amassed, Correia emphasized the importance of continuing the show in his father's honor, stating that it was a way to pay tribute to his legacy.

In September 2022, during an interview with Prudent Media, Correia shared the reason behind staging his father's final tiatr production, 8 Dis, following his father's death. He revealed that during his father's hospitalization, Comedian Selvy would inform fellow patients about his upcoming show schedules, expressing his determination to complete the shows and be discharged. After his father's funeral, Comedian Agostinho decided to fulfill his father's last wish by staging the tiatr production, which received a good response from the public, resulting in sold-out shows. The performances continued with Comedian Joyel taking on the role previously played by Correia's father.

In February 2023, Correia was chosen to join the cast of the tiatr production titled Inas. The play, written by Comedian Agostinho and directed by Comedian Joyel, featured Correia in the role of a comedian alongside fellow comedians Joyel, David, and Classy. Mario Pires, a critic from the Gomatak Times, commended the ensemble for their entertaining performances, noting the presence of clean comedy, which is not commonly found in many tiatrs. While Correia attempted various stage stunts, he was unable to match the prowess of his father. Additionally, Correia showcased his vocal abilities through a solo singing performance, sharing the spotlight with Benny de Aldona, Mita, and Pascoal Rodrigues. Furthermore, he participated in a trio song centered around football, collaborating with Francis, Joyel, and David.

In March 2023, Correia secured a role in Comedian Richard's tiatr production titled Ghov Khevta Jugar Bail Zata Fugar. Within this production, he portrayed a comedian alongside Comedian Richard, Comedian Sally, Agnelo, Rizton, and Princy. Correia's ability as a singer were also highlighted as he delivered a solo singing performance, sharing the stage with Lawry Travasso, Pascoal Rodrigues, Rosario de Benaulim, Peter de Arambol, Junior Reagan, and Roma. Mario Pires praised the quintet composed of Jr Reagan, Rizton, Richard, Correia, and Vilber, acknowledging their favorable reception by the audience.

As of March 2023, Correia continued to actively participate in various tiatr productions, including Comedian Richard's Ghov Khevta Jugar Bail Zata Fugar, Lawry Travasso's Sopnantlim Fulam, and the upcoming tiatr Chor by Com. Agostinho and Com. Joyel.

In August 2023, Correia secured a role as a singer in the tiatr production titled Panvlam, directed by Francis de Dicarpale. Within the production, Correia showcased his vocal abilities through a solo performance, sharing the stage with artists such as Rosario de Benaulim, Rons, Tony de Ribandar, Celeste, and Pascoal Rodrigues. Mario Pires, a critic from the Gomatak Times, highlighted the songs composed by Francisco/Meena and Correia/Tony de Ribandar/Agnelo/Rons for their messages intended for the audience.

In September 2023, Correia was cast as a comedian in Mutt Bhor Mati, a comedic tiatr production led by Comedian Sally. Alongside Correia, the production featured comedic talents including Dominic, Richard, Semenca, and Rizton. Furthermore, Correia exhibited his versatility by assuming the role of a singer, delivering a solo performance. Joining him on stage were Joylita, Pascoal Rodrigues, Lawry Travasso, Saby de Divar, and Joane, a child artist.

In October 2023, Correia secured a role in the comedic tiatr production Chor (Thief), directed by the Comedian Agostinho. Within the production, Correia performed as a comedian, sharing the stage with fellow comedians Joyel, David, Fiona, and Defny. Correia also displayed his singing skills with a solo performance alongside Pascoal Rodrigues, Benny de Aldona, Mita, and Daniel. Once again, Mario Pires of the Gomatak Times praised the nature of two songs composed by Francisco, David, Joyel, and Correia, as well as Benny, David, and Francisco, which received applause from the audience.

== Stage works ==
Year	Title	Role	Notes	Ref
2014	Mhoji Sun Mhoji Dhuv	Uncredited	Debut as child artiste	
2018	100%	Comedian/singer	Professional debut	
2019	College Life	Comedian/singer		
2019	My First Love	Uncredited		
2019	Raza Jeita Combo Choita	Comedian/singer		
2022	8 Dis	Comedian/singer		
2023	Inas	Comedian/singer		
2023	Ghov Khevta Jugar Bail Zata Fugar	Comedian/singer		
2023	Sopnantlim Fulam			
2023	Panvlam	Comedian/singer		
2023	Mutt Bhor Mati	Comedian/singer		
2023	Chor	Comedian/singer		
2024	Maimchem Korun Ghotton Sasumaink Khavoita Mutton	Comedian/singer		
2024	Mhozo Daddy	Comedian/singer	Also writer & director	
2024	Duplicate	Comedian		
2024	Grandma	Comedian		
2024	Konnache Chukik Lagon?	Comedian		
