= Comedian Ambe =

Indian comedian and actor

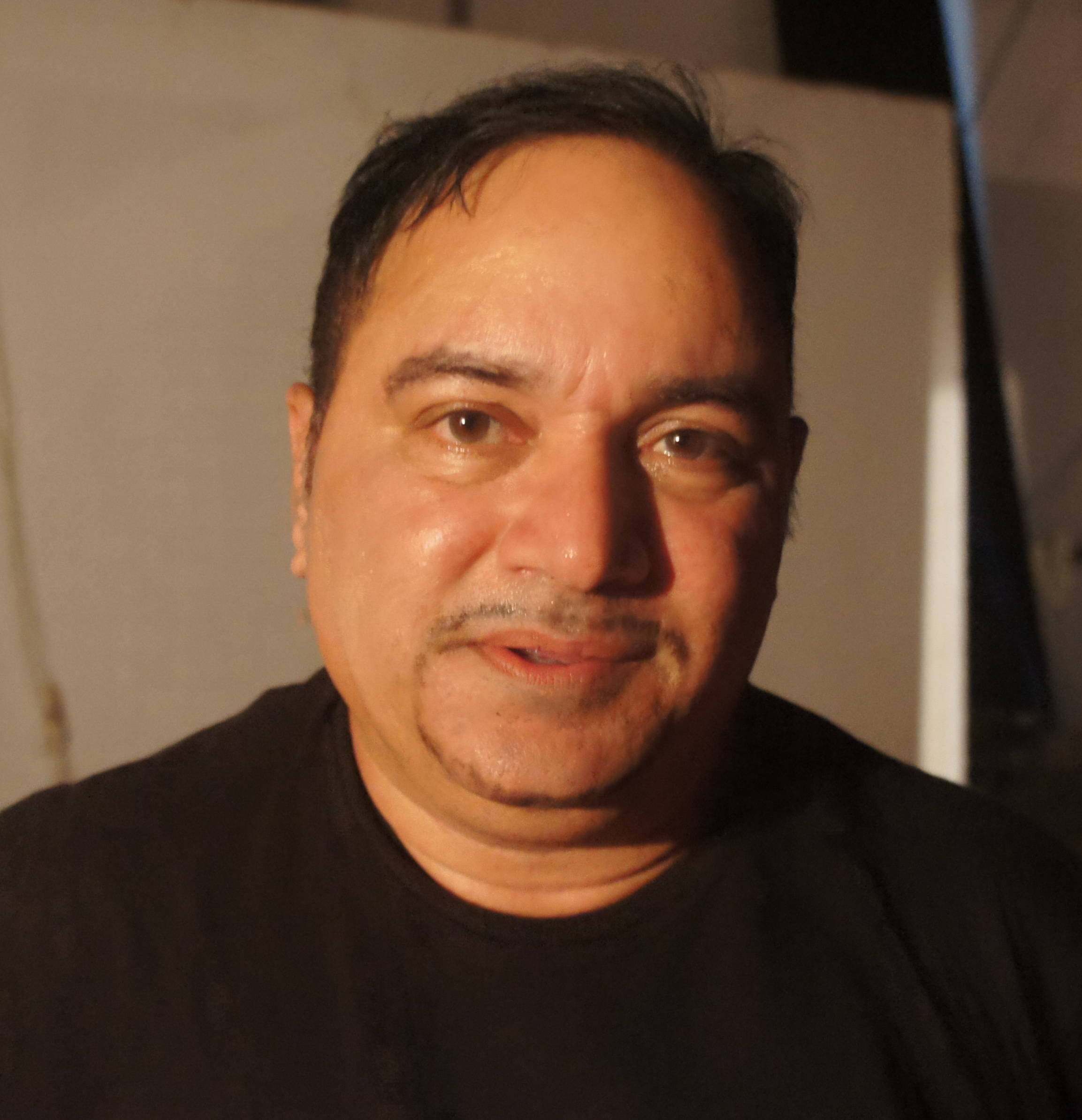
- Ambe at Hanuman Natyagraha, 2023
- Born: Sandeep Ambe
- Education: Diploma in Computer education
- Occupations: Comedian; actor; playwright; director; businessman
- Years active: 1980s–present
- Website: facebook.com/comedian.ambe

Sandeep Ambe, known professionally as Comedian Ambe, is an Indian comedian, actor, playwright, director, businessman, and former teacher known for his work in Konkani films and tiatr productions. As a school student, he staged his debut Konkani play, Dubaicho Novro, which led to him being discovered by Edwin Soares. Soares then helped Ambe get into Konkani one-act plays. He is best known for his role as a landlord in Menino Mario's tiatr, Dev Nhidonk Na (1987). In 2007, Ambe made his professional debut as a playwright with his tiatr, Hi Kudd Matiek Laitam.

== Early life ==
Ambe successfully concluded his academic pursuits at Model English High School situated in Margao, Goa. As a student, he exhibited a talent for mimicry, able to impersonate his teachers from various subjects, including mathematics, history, and science. His skill in mimicry was noted and appreciated by his classmates. Ambe was known for his astute observation of individuals and their behaviors, which contributed to his abilities in mimicry and entertainment.

During his youth, Ambe did mimicry, which he incorporated into his short play when asked to stage at a scouts and guides camp in Karwar. His performance in this improvised play earned him a prize. When he was not in school, during his summer breaks, many of his peers were engaged in recreational activities such as sports and vacations. However, during this interval, he capitalized on the occasion to organize and showcase a dramatic production in his hometown of Colva, Goa.

The production, titled Dubaicho Novro (Dubai Boyfriend), was facilitated by Ambe's collaboration with friends from his village. His theatrical abilities soon came to the attention of Edwin Soares, a theater director based in Betalbatim. Soares extended an invitation for him to join his theatrical ensemble, where he would have the opportunity to partake in the production of engaging one-act plays. In addition to his work in amateur theater, Ambe has also pursued formal education, completing a diploma in computer education. He subsequently gained experience working briefly as a computer educator.

== Career ==
Ambe rose to prominence in the late 20th century. In 1987, the Konkani tiatr Dev Nhidonk Na, directed by Mini Mario, he assumed the part of a landlord. This early performance helped him establish as an up-and-coming figure in the Konkani stage. Ambe continued to appear in various tiatrs throughout the late 1980s and early 1990s. In 1990, he was cast in the production Lok Kitem Mhonntolo directed by Rosario Rodrigues. However, it was Ambe's role in Rodrigues' 1991 tiatr Bhuk that garnered him fame. During the monsoon season, Bhuk garnered commercial success by completing 50 performances in different cities. In this play, Ambe portrayed the character of a secretary, co-starring alongside other actors such as Comedian Jesus and Rodrigues. His comedic timing and delivery in Bhuk were praised by audiences. Following the acclaim he received for his performance in Bhuk, he began to focus almost exclusively on taking on comedic roles in tiatrs.

Ambe then appeared in Filipe Almeida's production titled Ami Vetat (We Are Going). Three years later, in 1997, he performed in Patrick Dourado's tiatr Tem Koxem Melem (How Did She Die?). Ambe's talents were further showcased in 1999, when Roseferns incorporated his skills in mimicry into the tiatr Titloch Temp To (For That Time Being). The following year, in 2000, Pascoal Rodrigues enlisted him to portray a character in his theatrical performance known as Tin Khile (Three Nails). Over the subsequent years, Ambe continued to take on acting roles in Goan theater. In 2001, he was featured in Tony Dias' tiatr Ti Mhoji Maim (That is my Mother). This was followed by an appearance in Mario Menezes' Mhoji Maim, Mhoji Dusman (My Mother, My Enemy) in 2003. Prior to establishing himself as a figure in the tiatr industry as both an actor and director, Ambe contributed to Comedian Agostinho's 2006 production titled Aslelim Dukhi, Naslelim Sukhi (Rich Sad, Poor Happy).

Ambe underwent a shift in his professional focus starting in 2007. Prior to that year, he had primarily established himself as a comedian. However, beginning in January 2007, he commenced his endeavors to the creation and execution of his personal tiatr performances. In January 2007, he introduced his initial independently produced tiatr, entitled Hi Kudd Matiek Laitam. Over the following five years, he went on to create and stage 11 consecutive tiatr productions. Through this output, he carved out a reputation for himself as a playwright within the tiatr community, establishing his position among veterans in this field of the art form. Announcing his decision to temporarily pause tiatr production during the 2012 season, resulted in the cessation of the assembly of performers he had brought together during the preceding five-year period. Without any scheduled tiatr engagements, the performers who were part of his company went on to join alternative tiatr troupes for the shows of that season.

Ambe having taken a break from scripting and directing new productions in the 2012 season, he preemptively shared his plan with the rest of his troupe, affording them the opportunity to engage in collaborations with different playwrights throughout that timeframe. He specified that this sabbatical was only intended to last for one year, after which he expected to resume his role as both playwright and director with the same ensemble of performers in 2013. During his temporary hiatus from writing and directing duties in 2012, he instead accepted a comedic acting role in the tiatr Tumchinch Bhurguim (Yours Children), which was produced by fellow playwright Menino De Bandar. In May 2013, Ambe returned to the tiatr stage with a new production titled Chedvam Tim, Gadvam Nhoi. This work explored the fundamental societal factors contributing to the widespread problems of rape and various forms of violence targeting women in contemporary times.

== Personal life ==
Before embarking on a career in comedy, Ambe harbored uncertainties regarding his reception as a comedian among a predominantly Catholic audience, given his Hindu faith. In the present time, a significant portion of his audience remains uninformed about his religious beliefs, causing a misconception among admirers of tiatr (Goan theater) that he follows the Catholic faith. During his younger years, Ambe was employed at a family-owned general store. As of 2013, he remained actively involved in his family's business, A1 Stores, during his leisure hours. He relocated to Colva, Goa during his teenage years.
