= Education in Goa =

The smallest state in India, Goa covers an area of 3,702 km^{2}. Situated on the western coast of India, Goa shares its northern boundary with Maharashtra. Karnataka covers the eastern and southern boundary of the state. Panaji is the capital city of the state of Goa. One of the major tourist destinations in India, Goa also houses some of the best educational institutes of the nation. The education system here is comparatively better than many other states. According to the 2001 census report, the state has a literacy rate of 82%, well above the national average.

== School education ==
The quality of state-run schools and the low level of corruption has added to the betterment of education in Goa. There is not much demand for private schools in Goa as people are quite happy with the performance of the government schools at all levels. There are approximately 2,153 schools in Goa which includes primary schools, middle schools, secondary schools and higher secondary schools.

2011 Census
State/District	Literacy rate
Goa	88.7%
North Goa	89.57%
South Goa	87.59%

Most of the schools in Goa are affiliated with Goa Board of Secondary and Higher Secondary Education. However, one can also come across schools affiliated to the CBSE and ICSE board. English is the main medium of instruction at the schools in Goa. Konkani and Portuguese are also taught in several schools of the state. Navy Children School, Infant Jesus High School, Kendriya Vidyalaya No.1, Anjuman High School, Bal Bharati Vidya Mandir High School, Don Bosco School, Holy Cross High School, Guardian Angel High School are some of the renowned schools in Goa. Goa is multidimensional hub for education.

== Higher education ==
Goa University is the premier center of higher studies in the state and most of the colleges are affiliated to it. One can also come across medical and engineering colleges in Goa. There exists both private and government engineering colleges in the state. BITS Pilani — Goa is also a renowned institute which grants admission to the students on the basis of their performance in the all India aptitude test conducted by the institute. Some of the colleges in Goa offer courses in arts, commerce, science, law, architecture, dentistry, marine engineering, hotel management, fisheries and pharmacy. The National Centre for Antarctic and Ocean Research (NCAOR), Vasco-da-Gama and the National Institute of Oceanography (NIO), Dona Paula are scientific oceanographic laboratories located in Goa, offering training and opportunities for further studies and research in affiliation with universities like Goa University etc. Goa Institute of Management established in the year 1993 is a famous B-School of the region. Students interested in the study of the Portuguese language can pursue an undergraduate and a postgraduate degree in Portuguese from Goa University or inculcate conversational skills through short term certificate course at various centres run by the Instituto Camões and the Indo-Portuguese Society.
