= Comedian Selvy =

Indian comedian and singer (1974–2022)

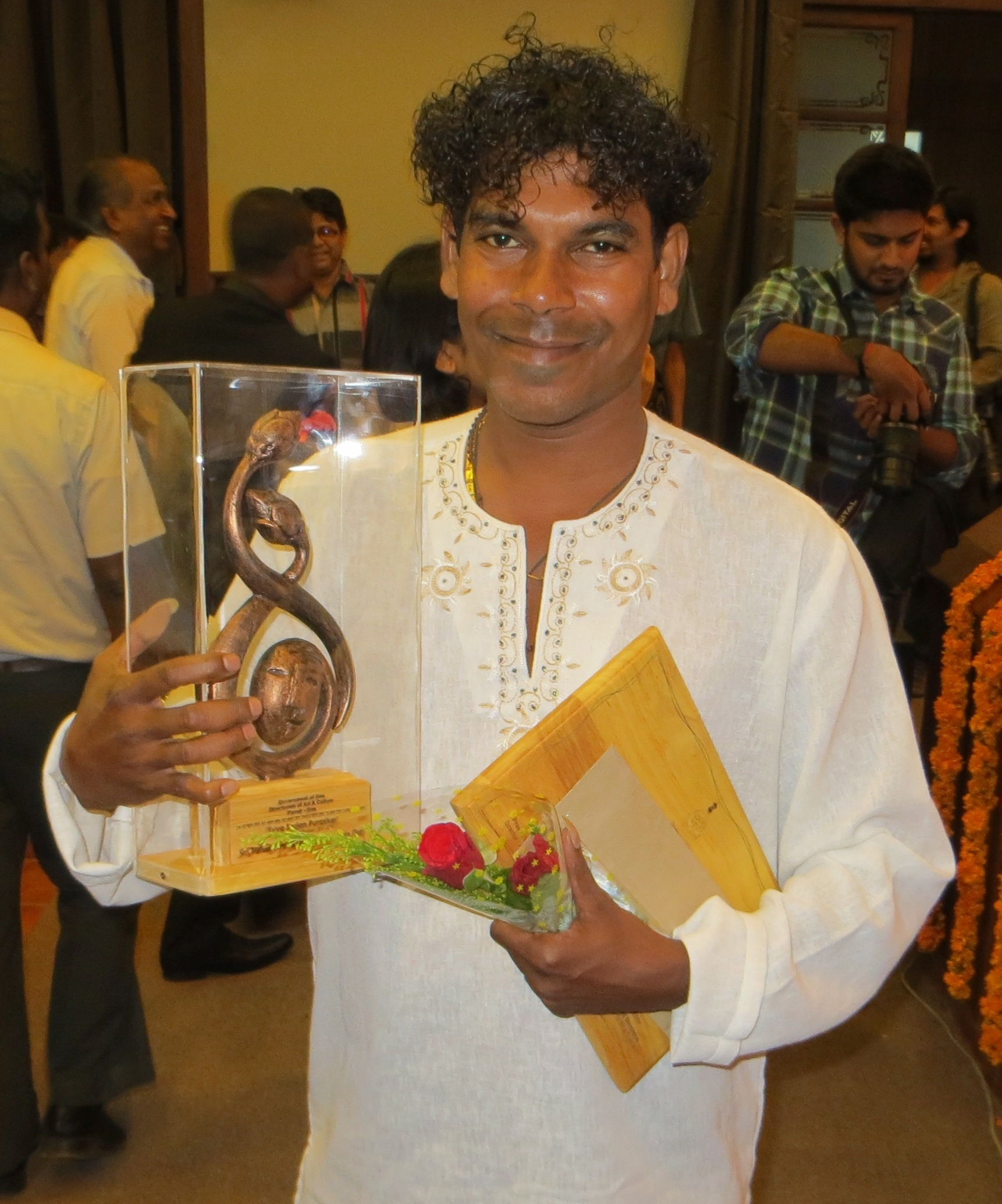
- Correia at Institute Menezes Braganza, 2013
- Born: Matheus Correia; 14 February 1974; Velim, Goa, India
- Died: 25 July 2022 (aged 48); Goa Medical College, Bambolim, Goa, India
- Burial place: St. Francis Xavier Church cemetery, Velim, Goa, India
- Occupations: Comedian; actor; singer; playwright; director; producer
- Years active: 1990s–2022
- Notable work: Welcome M1LL10NS
- Spouse: Candolina Fernandes
- Children: 2, including Comedian Myron
- Awards: Yuva Srujan Puraskar

Matheus Correia (14 February 1974 – 25 July 2022), known professionally as Comedian Selvy, was an Indian comedian, actor, playwright, singer, director, and producer known for his work in Konkani films and tiatr productions. Referred to as the "Comedy King of the Konkani stage" by The Navhind Times, he is regarded as one of the greatest Konkani comedians of his generation. He was noted mainly for his comedy performances and was deemed "Goa's most loved comedian".

== Career ==
=== Tiatrs ===
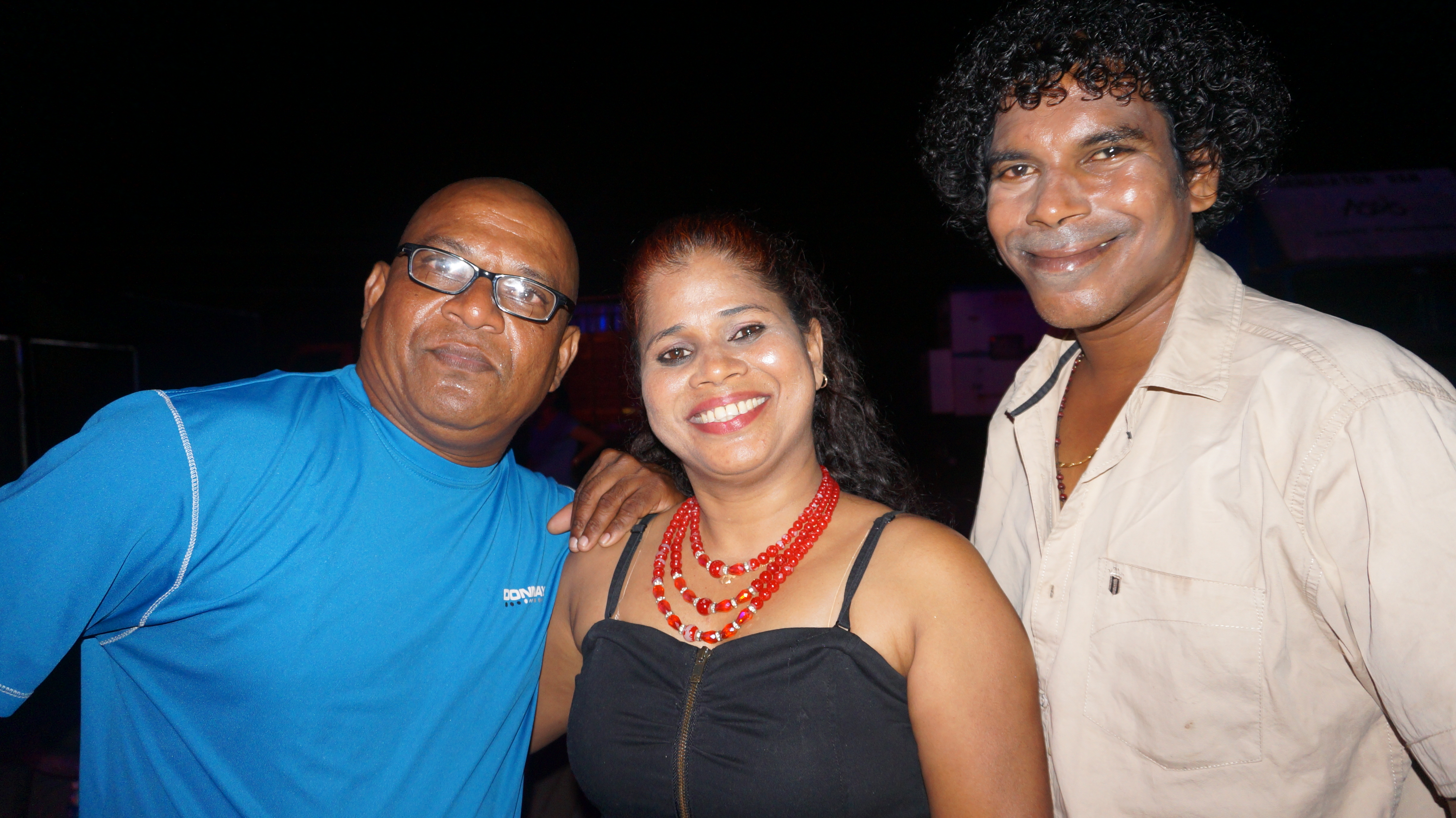

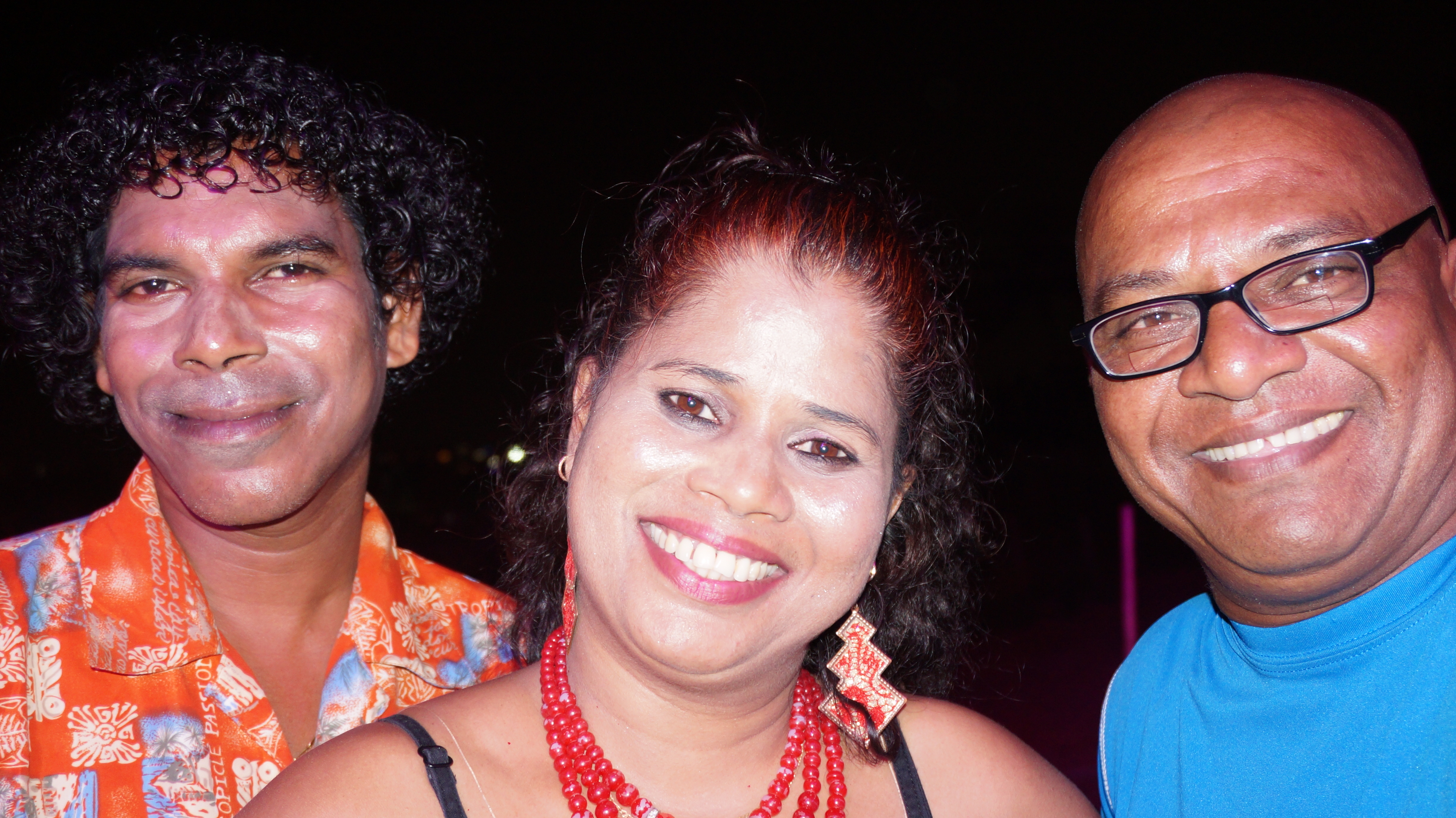
From left; Correia, Com. Janet and Com. Agostinho in 2015

Correia always had an immense love of, and keen interest in, the Konkani stage. He began acting at the age of 8 in his elder brother, Saude's tiatrs and village folk plays. Correia was also active in traditional Carnival folk plays (Konkani: Zomnivhele khell) before becoming a full-time professional tiatrist. He was first discovered by Tony Park who noted his skills in comedy and cast him for his non-stop tiatr. Correia had previously worked in the water resources department of the Goa Government before getting his big break at age 24 in 1998 as a professional comedian in John D'Silva's tiatr Vatt (Way).

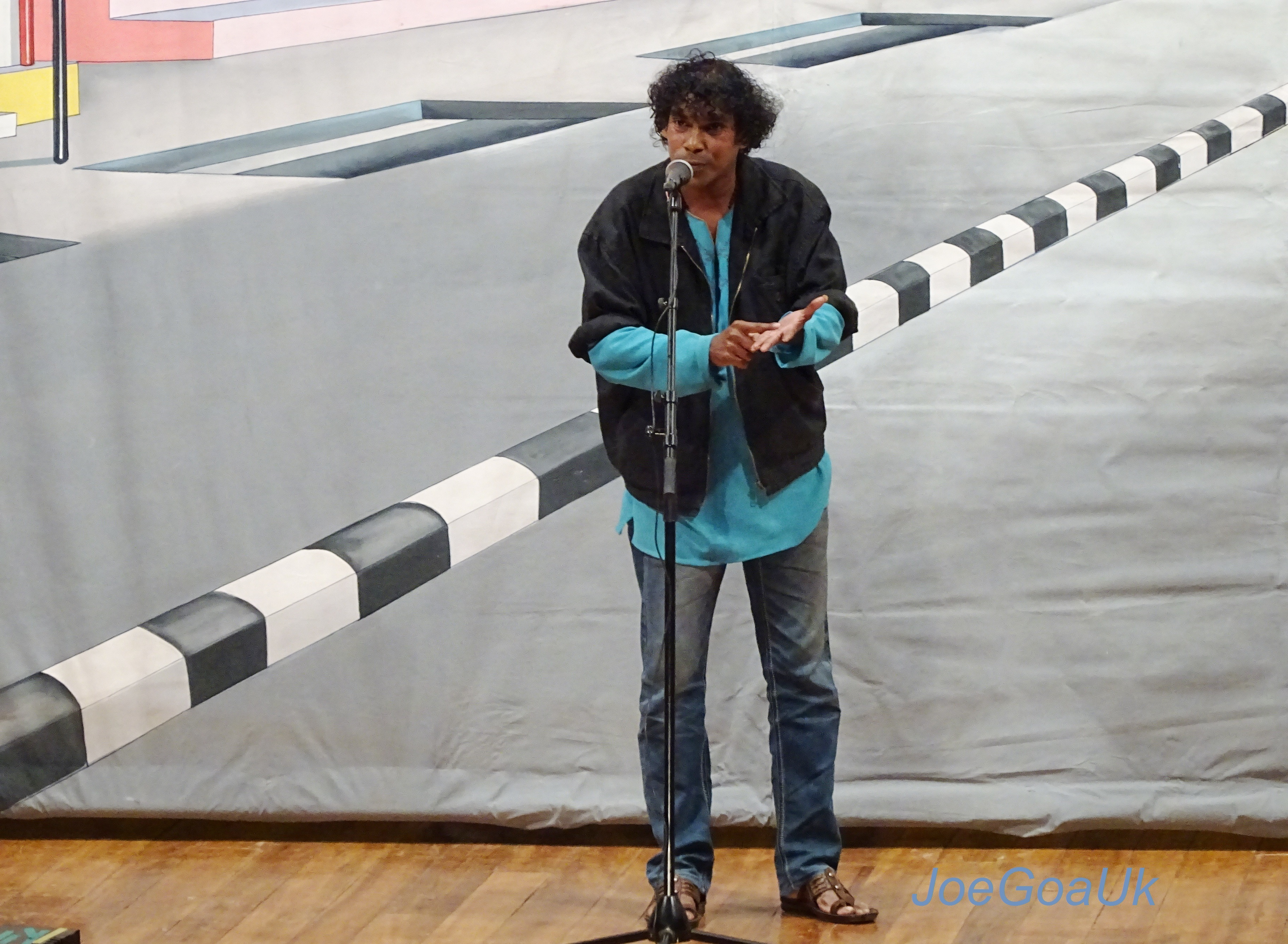
Correia performing in Strike tiatr in February 2016

During his career span of more than two decades as a Konkani comedian, Correia has acted in more than 60 tiatrs and was cast by prominent Konkani directors such as John D'Silva (14–15 tiatrs), Agostinho Themudo (23 tiatrs) from 2007 to 2019, beginning from the tiatr Sir to signing off in Pai (Father) and Roseferns (20 tiatrs) in the late 1990s, 2000s and 2010s. He was also cast by other notable Goan tiatr directors like Mario Menezes, Comedian Sally, C. D'Silva, Pascoal Rodrigues and Milagres de Chandor. Joyel Fernandes, known professionally as Comedian Joyel, an emerging Konkani comedian from Maina-Curtorim also recalls that Correia was his inspiration to take up the comedy genre.

=== VCDs and CDs ===
Correia was also featured in more than 200 VCDs. He produced 5 of them namely, Bekar Louddi, Second Hand, Garbage and Wrong Number. He was also known for his singing skills, and has sung in about 25 CDs. After attaining much success in his tiatr career, Correia went on a global tour with his troupe in places like United Kingdom, Paris, The Middle East to perform for his audience.

=== Directoral debut and films ===
Correia eventually started writing, producing and directing his own tiatrs. Raza Jeita Kombo Choita and 8 Dis (8 Days) remain his only and most popular productions till date, which resulted in a tremendous positive response from the Goan diaspora in the United Kingdom. The latter also crossed the silver jubilee mark prior to his death and was on the way towards the golden jubilee with a scheduled show in London in late July.

Correia was also known for his role of Mad Man in the 2018 Konkani film, Welcome M1LL10NS. He was also seen acting in his last Konkani film, Rong (Colour) directed by Aggi Rod and produced by Joywin Fernandes, which was posthumously released on YouTube on 24 August 2022.

== Personal life ==
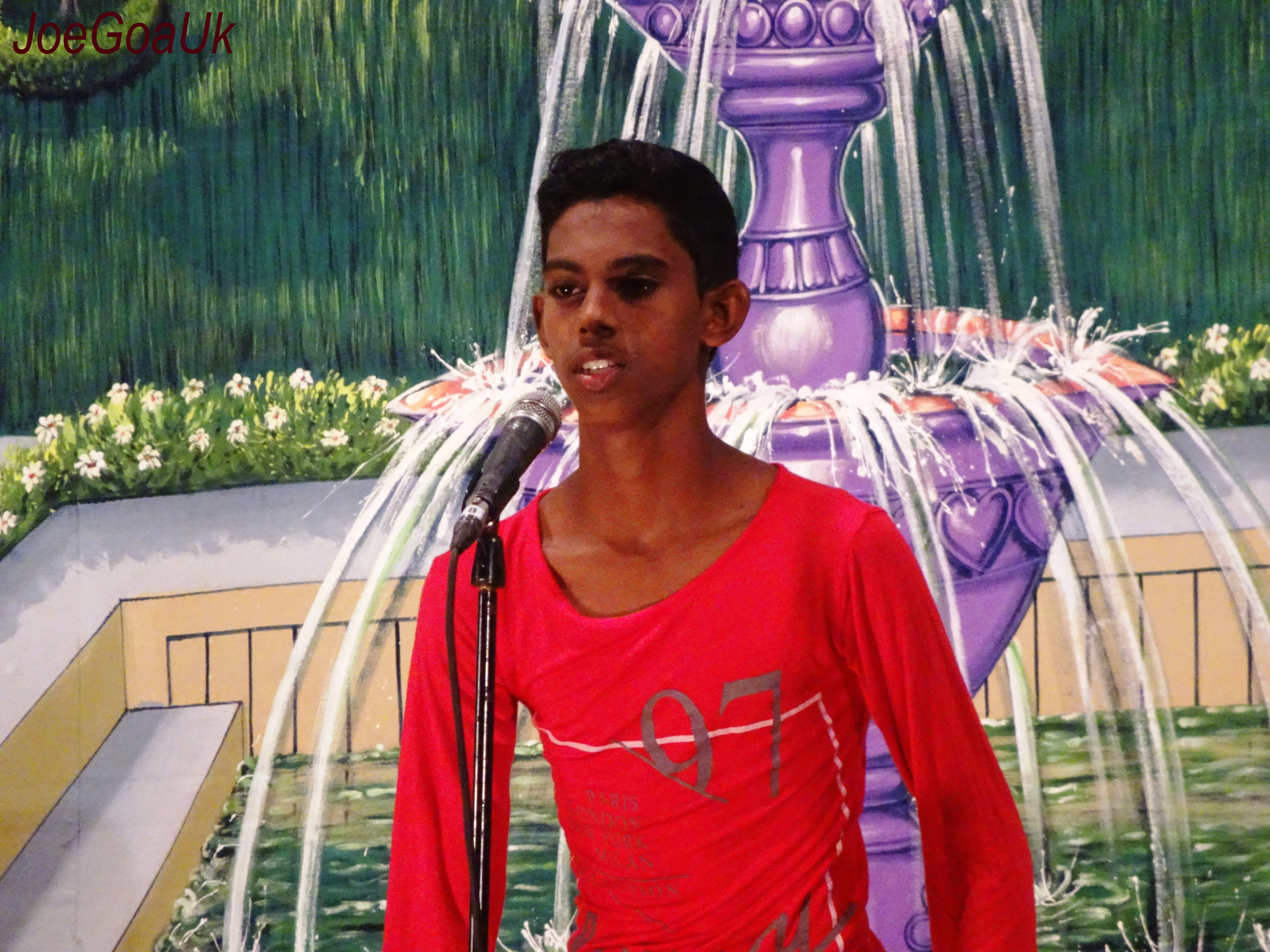
Selvy's elder son, Comedian Myron (Myron Correia) in May 2018

Matheus Correia was born to Goan Catholic parents, Jose Correia and Joana Batistina Fernandes, on 14 February 1974 in Velim, hailing from Fursabhatt. He was a practising Roman Catholic and was married to Candolina Fernandes, with whom he had two sons, Myron (Comedian Myron) and Ryan.

== Awards ==
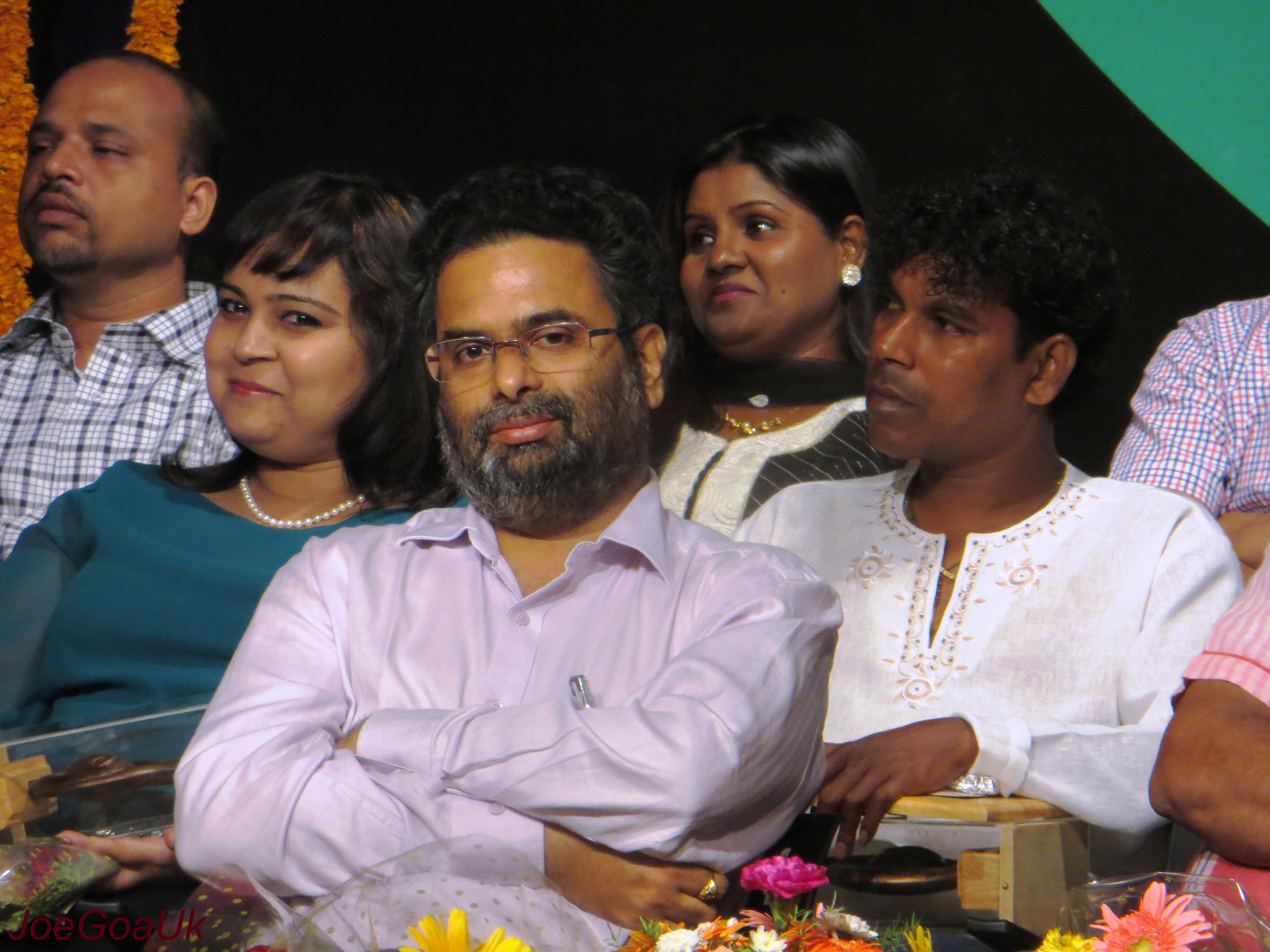
Prasad Lolienkar (C), Sonia Shirsat (L), Roma (top right) and Selvy (R) at Yuva Srujan Puraskar Award ceremony in February 2013

Correia was honoured by the Gulab Award in 2007 and Dr. Jack de Sequeira Memorial Award for his contributions towards the Konkani stage. He was also a recipient of the Yuva Srujan Puraskar award from the Arts and Culture Department of the Goa Government for the year 2011–2012.

== Death ==
Correia had complained to his troupe about uneasiness and toothache while performing in his tiatr, 8 Dis (8 days). On 15 July 2022, he visited the South Goa District Hospital in Margao for a checkup during which he was informed by the examining specialist that his diabetes and haemoglobin levels were showing negative signs. He was moved swiftly to Goa Medical College and was admitted on 16 July 2022. Selvy's elder son, Myron Correia, informed the media that his father's diabetes was under control but the blood platelet count was still low. He later was shifted to the intensive care unit of the hospital, wherein he received many telephone calls from his loved ones. Several Goans also offered to donate blood to save his life after many blood donation requests were made. However, on 25 July 2022, Selvy unexpectedly died at the age of 48.

=== Reactions ===
The Chief Minister of Goa, Pramod Sawant and several other political leaders gave their condolences to the bereaved family.

=== Funeral ===
Correia's funeral was held on 27 July 2022 at St. Francis Xavier Church, Velim. It was attended by tens of thousands of Goans, including his family, friends, tiatr fraternity and political leaders. He was later laid to rest at St. Francis Xavier Church cemetery, Velim.

== Legacy ==
On 31 July 2022, Correia's tiatr 8 Dis (8 Days) was staged posthumously in response to public demand and as a fulfillment to his last wish. Myron, Correia's elder son, also mentioned that prior to his father's death, he wanted the doctors to discharge him so that he could perform in the show. Hundreds of tiatr lovers were seen paying their respects at Ravindra Bhavan in Margao, and a one-minute silence was observed to honor Correia.

== Selected stage works ==
Year	Title	Role	Ref
	Amchem Chintop Tumchem Xixop	Comedian	
	Amontronn	Comedian	
	Aslelim Dukhi Naslelim Sukhi	Comedian	
	Avessor	Comedian	
	Bott	Comedian	
	Bovall	Comedian	
	Budhvontank Fatranchem Xit	Comedian	
	Daddy	Comedian	
	Dessak Luttinaka	Comedian	
	Dev Boro Dis Dium	Comedian	
	Devak Zai Zalear	Comedian	
	Dhull	Comedian	
	Ekvott	Comedian	
	Fight For Right	Comedian	
	Il’Lixi Chuk	Comedian	
	Jem Devan Goddlam	Comedian	
	Jezu Amkam Ilaz	Comedian	
	Jezuchem Povitr Rogot	Comedian	
	Jinn	Comedian	
	Kaideachem Vo Faideachem	Comedian	
	Kazari Put Konnacho? Maicho Vo Bailecho?	Comedian	
	Kirnnam	Comedian	
	Konn?	Comedian	
	Magnnem	Comedian	
	Match Fixing	Comedian	
	Menn	Comedian	
	Meulelem Naka Sandlelem Zai	Comedian	
	Mhaka Sangat	Comedian	
	Mhoji Sun Mhoji Dhuv	Comedian	
	Mhozo Suskar Tum!	Comedian	
	Monisponn Vo Devosponn	Comedian	
	Mummy	Comedian	
	Nhoim Mogache Pun Rogtache	Comedian	
	Osleo Sunnom Gharant Ietoch	Comedian	
	Pai	Comedian	
	Pavsa Pavsa Yo Re Yo	Comedian	
	Peleachea Vostunchu Axea Korum Noie	Comedian	
	Police	Comedian	
	Porddo	Comedian	
	Purtugez Goenkar	Comedian	
	Que Sera Sera – Zaunchem Zatelem	Comedian	
2019	Raza Jieta Kombo Choita	Director & comedian	
	Rogot	Comedian	
2007	Sir	Comedian	
	Sokallim	Comedian	
	Somzonni	Comedian	
	Sorry	Comedian	
	Sot’tor Pautti Saat	Comedian	
	Sounsarant Borem Naum Dovor	Comedian	
	Sukhnneachem Ghor Ghontter Nhoi	Comedian	
	Suknnim	Comedian	
2016	Strike	Comedian	
	Tem Tuka Naka	Comedian	
	Tempa Pormonnem	Comedian	
	Udok	Comedian	
	Ugddas	Comedian	
	Umannem	Comedian	
	Undir Mhojea Mama	Comedian	
	Undir Mogan Podlo	Comedian	
	Vaitt	Comedian	
	Vann	Comedian	
1998	Vatt	Comedian	
	Voir Marlolo Fator	Comedian	
	Xezarim Mornnak, Soirim Jevnnak	Comedian	
	Xik Aikpak, Aik Xikpak	Comedian	
	Zero	Comedian	
2022	8 Dis	Writer, director & comedian	

== Select filmography ==
Year	Title	Role	Ref
2018	WELCOME M1LL10NS	Mad man	
2022	Rong	Comedian	
