= Goa Board of Secondary and Higher Secondary Education =

Board of education in Goa, India

- Official logo of GBSHSE
- Abbreviation: GBSHSE
- Established: 27 May 1975; 50 years ago
- Type: State Governmental Board of Education
- Location: Porvorim, Goa, India
- Official language: English; Konkani; Marathi
- Chairman: Bhagirath G. Shetye
- Secretary: V. B. Naik
- Key people: Geraldina Mendes; Jyotsna Sarin
- Main organ: Government of Goa
- Affiliations: 518 schools (2023)
- Budget: ₹2,194.03 crore (US$260 million) (2023)
- Expenses: ₹27 crore (US$3.2 million) (2023)
- Students: 38,457 (2022)
- Website: www.gbshse.in

The Goa Board of Secondary and Higher Secondary Education (GBSHSE) is a corporate statutory body established by the state legislature through the enactment of the "Goa, Daman and Diu Secondary and Higher Secondary Education Board Act, 1975" (Act No. 13 of 1975) on 27 May 1975. This act grants the board a corporate status and statutory authority to oversee secondary and higher secondary education in the state.

The Board administers examinations for two levels of education: Standard X and Standard XII. These exams take place in the months of March and June. The Board is responsible for addressing confidential and time-critical issues, which restricts its ability to have direct interactions with individuals. As a result, the Board primarily engages and communicates with institutions on a regular basis.

In addition to its primary responsibilities, the Board periodically undertakes initiatives to enhance the education system and provides recommendations to the state government when deemed appropriate. Moreover, it bestows national-level scholarships upon deserving students.

== Objectives ==
The primary objectives of the Board are to offer secondary and higher secondary education and authorize a sufficient number of schools in the region to fulfill this purpose. Additionally, the Board focuses on enhancing the quality of secondary and higher secondary education to ensure it meets the necessary standards for economic and social progress.

It also strives to provide suitable resources for the educational and professional advancement of socially and educationally disadvantaged communities. Moreover, the Board undertakes various initiatives aimed at fostering the intellectual, academic, physical, and cultural development of young individuals.

== Functions ==
The Board holds several important responsibilities in the field of secondary and higher secondary education. It is primarily responsible for granting and revoking recognition for Secondary and Higher Secondary Schools. Additionally, it serves as an advisory body to the government, providing guidance on various policy matters related to secondary and higher secondary education.

One of its main functions is to promote a consistent and standardized approach to education, aiming to establish a uniform pattern of learning across the country. It also endeavors to maintain a uniform standard of education in Secondary and Higher Secondary schools, ensuring that students receive a comparable level of instruction regardless of their location.

The Board plays a crucial role in coordinating national policies with state-level policies concerning Secondary and Higher Secondary Education, fostering alignment and integration between the two. Furthermore, it promotes coordination and coherence between different educational levels, including primary, secondary, higher secondary, and university education, to facilitate a smooth educational progression for students.

Another vital responsibility is the development of guiding principles for curricula and syllabi at all levels of secondary and higher secondary education. In addition, the Board prepares detailed syllabi for each standard within the secondary and higher secondary education system, providing a comprehensive framework for teaching and learning.

Moreover, the Board advises the government on the standard requirements for staff, buildings, furniture, equipment, stationery, and other necessary amenities in secondary and higher secondary schools. This guidance aims to create an environment conducive to effective teaching and learning.

To support the educational process, the Board is authorized to prescribe and develop textbooks for all levels of secondary and higher secondary education. This ensures that students have access to appropriate and high-quality learning materials that align with the established curricula and syllabi.

Additionally, the Board sets the conditions for admission to the final examinations for both regular and private candidates. These conditions are designed to maintain the integrity and fairness of the examination process.

Lastly, the Board assumes the responsibility of declaring the results of the final examinations it conducts. This outcome determines the academic achievements of students within the secondary and higher secondary education system, providing an assessment of their knowledge and skills acquired during their studies.
