= Unaided educational institution =

Type of educational institution in India

- Type: Educational institution
- Location: India
- Field: Education in India

An unaided educational institution, is a class of private educational institutes in India. They are distinct from so-called "aided" private educational institutions. The term covers institutes ranging from primary schools to higher education colleges. Unaided educational institutions can be "recognised" or "non-recognised" by the Government of India.

The unaided stream is one of three primary streams of public education in some regions of India, along with "government" and "aided" sectors. An aided educational institute is a private institute that is receiving aid from the Indian government. The government prescribes the qualifications required for appointment as teachers in government and recognised private (aided and unaided) schools.

In unaided educational institutions, salaries are paid by a private institution. In the aided sector, salaries are paid by the government. Admission of most students in aided institutes are based on merit and affirmative action, except in special cases.

== See also ==
- Independent school
- Charter school
