= Restaurant management =

Profession

A restaurant manager (foreground, with his back to camera) addresses a team of kitchen and food service employees.

Restaurant management is the profession of leading and administering the operation of a food service establishment. Associate, bachelor, and graduate degree programs are offered in restaurant management by community colleges, junior colleges, and some universities in the United States and elsewhere.

== Kitchen hierarchy ==
=== Escoffier system ===
One hierarchical system for organizing a restaurant's kitchen staff is the brigade de cuisine system developed by Auguste Escoffier (1846–1935). This is a comprehensive list of the members of a full kitchen brigade. Only the largest of establishments would have a staff of this size. As noted under some titles, certain positions are combined into other positions when such a large staff is unnecessary. Note: Despite the use of chef in English as the title for a cook, the word actually means "chief" or "head" in French. Similarly, cuisine means "kitchen", but also refers to food or cooking generally, or a type of food or cooking.

The Chef de cuisine (kitchen chef; "chief of the kitchen") is responsible for overall management of kitchen; supervises staff, creates menus and new recipes with the assistance of the restaurant manager, makes purchases of raw food items, trains apprentices, and maintains a sanitary and hygienic environment for the preparation of food.

The Sous-chef de cuisine (deputy or second kitchen chef; "under-chief") receives orders directly from the chef de cuisine for the management of the kitchen, and often serves as the representative when the chef de cuisine is not present.

The Chef de partie (senior chef; "chief of the group") is responsible for managing a given station in the kitchen, specializing in preparing particular dishes there. Those who work in a lesser station are commonly referred to as a demi-chef.

These leaders give direction to cooks and other kitchen staff.

=== Hotel or resort restaurants ===
A typical organizational chart for a large resort hotel's restaurant operation may often resemble the following:

- Director of food and beverage
  - Restaurant manager
  - Assistant restaurant manager
  - Executive chef
    - Room service manager
    - Butlers manager
    - Club manager
    - Bar & lounge manager
    - Banquets manager
    - Catering manager

== Waiting staff ==
Maitre d'hotel Gil Galasso carving roast meat for guests.

In large luxury establishments, there are often multiple ranks of waiting staff leaders in the dining room:

- Maître d'hôtel (fine dining), responsible for dining room as a whole, greets guests; sometimes acts as headwaiter and/or supervisor
  - Chef de Rang (fine dining), (Captain/Head Waiter): Achieved after several years of experience in fine dining, responsible for managing a specific section or station (known as a rang) of the dining room
    - Demi-Chef de Rang (fine dining), (Junior Captain): A transitional role with more guest interaction work under the Chef de Rang.
    - Commis de Rang (fine dining), (Busser/Back-waiter): An entry-level role in fine dining directly assigned to assisting the Chef de Rang.
      - Floor manager

These leaders give direction to various waiting staff (servers) and bussers.
