= Menino De Bandar =

Indian playwright and director (born 1957)

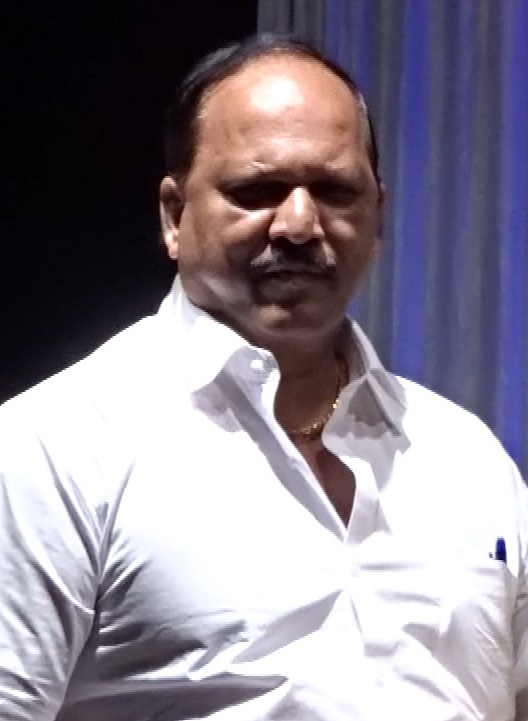
- Fernandes at Gomant Vidya Niketan, 2015
- Born: Menino Fernandes; 17 February 1957 (age 69); Benaulim, Goa, Portuguese India
- Occupations: Playwright; director; singer; composer
- Years active: c. 1974–present
- Known for: Soccorina (1984)
- Spouse: Salvação Silva (m. 1984)
- Children: 3

4th President of Tiatr Academy of Goa
- In office October 2020 – October 2023
- Preceded by: Comedian Agostinho
- Succeeded by: Anthony Barbosa

Menino Fernandes (born 17 February 1957), known professionally as Menino De Bandar, is an Indian playwright, theatre director, singer, composer, and actor known for his work in tiatr and khell tiatr (street play) productions. Referred to as the "King of Triple Centuries", he is best known for his play Soccorina (1984), having amassed more than 500 shows and having been restaged two times. Fernandes served as the president of the Tiatr Academy of Goa from October 2020 to 2023.

== Early life ==
Menino Fernandes was born on 17 February 1957 in Benaulim, Goa, which was part of Portuguese India, during the Portuguese Empire, to José Antonio Fernandes, a tailor, and Ana Severina Fernandes, a homemaker. Fernandes's family background included involvement in contradance, a regional song and dance tradition featuring ankle bracelets. Contradans bears similarities to the folk dance known as zagor, though the latter is sometimes associated with more risqué or vulgar lyrical content.

Fernandes inherited musical and performative talents from his father José, who was active in the Contradance tradition. Beginning at the age of 15, Fernandes initially exhibited his vocal prowess by performing at various school functions, such as commemorations for the principal's birthday. During his childhood, he actively took part in school theatrical productions and musical concerts. As he matured, he expanded his performative repertoire to include roles in village khells - traditional dramatic presentations. Fernandes transitioned to khell writing, eventually composing his own original khells and khell tiatrs, a Goan form of folk theatre.

== Career ==
Fernandes rose to prominence in the street plays (zomnivhele khell) tradition beginning in his late teenage years. From the age of 17 onward, he wrote and produced his own original street plays, which he and a troupe of performers would present shows or performances in the vicinity of private residences. Each performance, or act (parti), of Fernandes' plays was priced at ₹10 (equivalent to ₹300 or US$3.50 in 2023) for the audience. In his debut street play Bhikari (Beggar), Fernandes overcame parental apprehension by using white quicklime or brick dust to paint his and his fellow performers' faces. The production was presented in a cowshed located within a household that housed cattle. After this debut, Fernandes crafted theatrical works comprising three acts specifically for street shows held during carnival celebrations. He organized a troupe of performers to enact these productions, referred to as khell. While he wrote and directed his own original works, he did not appear as an actor in plays created by others, preferring to focus on his skills as a playwright. His street plays gained popularity, and he began entering them in competitions. In these contests, Fernandes earned multiple awards in recognition of his writing and production abilities within the zomnivhele khell tradition.

Fernandes is known for his distinctive approach to theatrical production. In the early stages of his career, he eschewed the use of written scripts, instead opting to verbally explain the plot of each play to his actors. The performers would then interpret and enact to his oral instructions, with the plays becoming "refined and polished" through repeated performances. Fernandes also incorporated original musical compositions into his theatrical works, with the songs reflecting the themes of the plays. His songs often conclude with an opari, (sayings or proverbs). This innovative approach proved popular with audiences, who responded positively to the minimal use of written material, as only the basic cants (songs) and plot summaries were formally documented.

For the first fifteen years of his career, Fernandes was able to stage his productions without relying on formal written scripts. It was only later that he began to incorporate scripted elements into a small number of his plays. His theatrical debut was a single-act play titled Noxib ani Tufan (Luck and Storm), which he presented in 1978. Following this initial production, he went on to write and stage several additional plays and non stop dramas. Some of his popular works include Duddu ani Ginean (Money and Knowledge), Soccorina (1984), Ho Uzo Paloiat (Put Out This Fire), Ghara Ea (Come Home), Khorench Hanv Fattim Paulom, etc. These works experienced commercial success, with several surpassing 100 individual performances. Soccorina stood out by achieving 215 shows within the first year of its debut. The work was later revived in 2015, leading to an additional 309 performances, and was again re-staged in July 2024.

In his early career, Fernandes found that his contributions to writing and acting in khell tiatrs did not fully meet his expectations for personal satisfaction and a sense of fulfillment. Despite being familiar with tiatrs from his early years, this exposure sparked his ambition to pursue a career as a tiatrist, with a particular interest in vocal performance, he encountered obstacles. However, his foray into writing khell tiatrs proved successful, attracting significant audiences to his productions. However, he eventually transitioned to writing full-length tiatr productions, drawing on his background as a singer and composer.

Fernandes' tiatr plays were well-received by audiences in Goa and gained him acclaim, as he was known for assembling group of popular performers to star in his tiatrs. Some of his most popular works included Florian Vaz, Sounsarant Astana Diat, Mhozo Uzvadd (My Light), and Sogleani Korchem etc. A distinctive feature of his tiatrs was that Fernandes consistently took on the task of presenting the inaugural song in his tiatrs. His musical compositions were known for their meanings, philosophical insights, and utilization of proverbs and customary adages. In addition to his popularity within Goa, he also brought his tiatr productions to other parts of India, such as Bombay, as well as to Goan diaspora communities in the Gulf region, where they were also acclaimed.

Fernandes is known for creating musical pieces called cants which are included in the tiatr shows he produces. The inclusion of his compositions is a significant draw for audiences attending his tiatrs. In addition to his work as a songwriter, he has also released an audio cassette containing his songs, which achieved commercial success. During the early 1990s, Fernandes temporarily ceased his stage performances as he pursued employment opportunities in Muscat, Oman, leading to a hiatus in his theatrical engagements. However, he took part in performances of his own tiatr shows and productions directed by others. Additionally, he supported other tiatr directors in coordinating their shows in Muscat. In October 2020, Fernandes was elected to serve as the president of the Tiatr Academy of Goa (TAG) for a three-year term. He was later succeeded in this role by Sagun Velip, Director of Art and Culture of Government of Goa, who served as the interim president of the organization.

== Personal life ==
Fernandes is married to Salvação Silva, together they have three daughters Jayanti, Ramira, and Soccorina. Jayanti, the youngest daughter, is a lawyer by profession and is also active on the Konkani tiatr stage as an actress and singer. During the early 1990s, Fernandes temporarily moved to Muscat, Oman, for work and took a break from Konkani theatre. During his periodic trips to Goa while on leave, he would arrange for the staging of his tiatrs. As of 2012, he resides in the Mazilvaddo neighborhood in Benaulim with his family.

=== 1984 defamation case ===
The 1984 Konkani theatrical production Soccorina, by Fernandes, became the subject of a defamation case and controversy. During the original staging of the play, certain attendees alleged that the performance was influenced by a genuine occurrence related to the demise of a girl named Soccorina from Colva. This assertion was supported by references in Wilson Mazarello's 2000 book 100 Years of Konkani Tiatro, as well as comments made by tiatrist (Konkani theater performer) Michael Gracias in a 2015 article in The Goan Everyday, when the play was revived. Gracias raised concerns that the introductory musical piece in the performance included veiled references to a specific individual or event, prompting worries about the protection of privacy. As a result of these claims, Fernandes faced a defamation lawsuit in 1984. He received legal representation from various lawyers, with additional tiatrists, including John Claro, serving as witnesses during the proceedings. After nearly two years of legal proceedings, Fernandes ultimately prevailed in the case in 1986.
