= Comedian Agostinho =

Comedian and actor (born 1964)

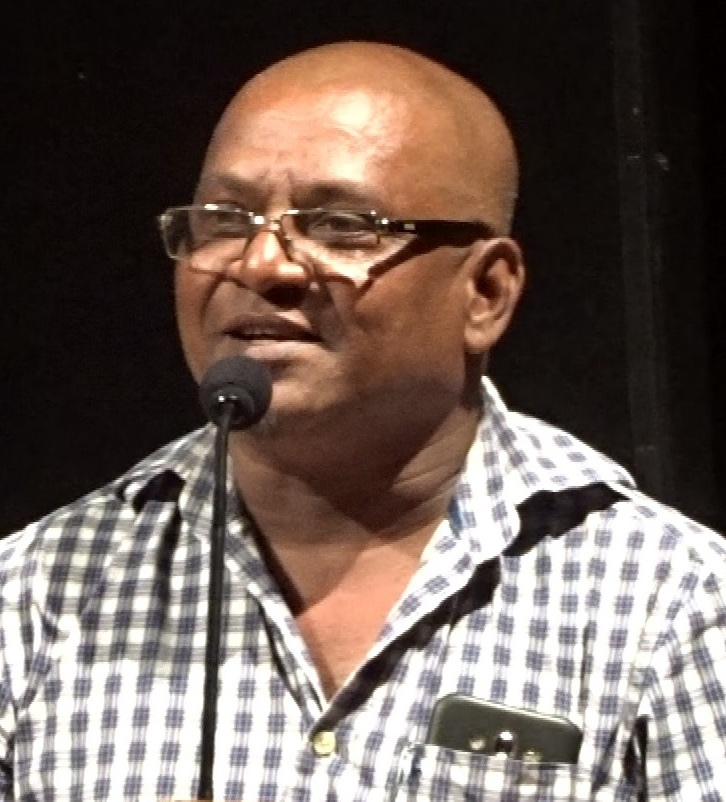
- Temudo at the Kala Academy, 2016
- Born: Agostinho Temudo; 17 March 1964 (age 62); Navelim, Goa, India
- Education: Secondary School Certificate (SSC)
- Occupations: Comedian; actor; director; producer; screenwriter; playwright
- Years active: 1980s–present
- Spouse: Jesmin Rebelo (m. 1997)
- Children: 3

3rd President of Tiatr Academy of Goa
- In office 4 September 2015 – October 2018
- Preceded by: Prince Jacob
- Succeeded by: Menino De Bandar
- Website: facebook.com/agostinho.temudo

Agostinho Temudo (born 17 March 1964), known professionally as Comedian Agostinho, is a comedian, actor, director, producer, screenwriter, and playwright based in London, UK. He is known for his work in Konkani films and tiatr (theatre) productions. Referred to as the "Comedy King", he is best known for being part of the comedy trio alongside Comedian Selvy and Comedienne Janet, for which they were awarded the Best Comedy Trio. Temudo is a former president of the Tiatr Academy of Goa, having served from September 2015 to October 2018. His plays are based on societal themes, some of which exposed corruption by the local government, police departments, and local politicians.

== Early life ==
Agostinho Temudo was born on 17 March 1964 in Navelim, Goa, India. His father was a tailor and he grew up among seven siblings. Growing up, Temudo had a number of responsibilities around the household. He engaged in the distribution of milk from his family's cattle to their established clientele during his daily commute to and from school. Additionally, in the afternoons, he would retrieve the vacant milk containers from these transactions.

The Temudo family resided in the Dongorim area of Navelim. As a child, he was described as being mischievous in nature. He enjoyed in engaging in light-hearted pranks and playful teasing with his companions, a tendency that continued even after he began his schooling. While these antics may have been seen as problematic at the time, they would later prove beneficial for Temudo. He attended Rosary High School in Navelim, where he completed his secondary education and received his Secondary School Certificate (SSC). It was during his time at this school that Temudo was afforded his first acting opportunity.

Due to financial constraints, Temudo was unable to pursue further formal education beyond his current level of schooling. During his time as a student, he was reportedly somewhat weak in his command of the English language. However, his teachers recognized his creativity and playful nature, with his English instructor, Ms. Shalini, offering him a role in an English-language school play titled The Escaped Lunatic. On the day of the production, Temudo's performance in the play was well-received by both his teachers and peers, who lavished him with praise for his acting abilities.

It was noted that Temudo himself was unaware until after the completion of the play that he had been cast in the lead role, and that the success of the production was influenced by his performance and theatrical abilities. This initial foray into the school's theatrical sphere marked the beginning of his involvement in various extracurricular stage presentations and concerts hosted by the institution. He became a regular participant in these types of school-based performing arts events following his successful debut in The Escaped Lunatic.

== Career ==
Temudo caught the interest of the elder figures within his nearby community. The older boys in his village offered him the opportunity to take on a comedic role in an upcoming tiatr performance, that was scheduled as part of the village's annual feast in Navelim. It was during this tiatr production that Temudo caught the eye of Albert, another resident of the village who was known for writing folk plays (khells). During the carnival season, Temudo secured a role in one of Albert's traditional play performances. He continued to hone his acting skills by appearing in Albert's plays, titled Vonott and Baim (Well). He was later enlisted by a well-known tiatr artist named Lino Dourado. While working with Dourado in the tiatr Mauli, Temudo was approached by Jose Rod and offered a major comedic role in that production. In the Mauli tiatr, Temudo collaborated with popular comedic actors such as Comedian Domnic and Comedian Philip Pereira. His work alongside these tiatrists appeared to boost his reputation and career. In a short time, he started to receive invitations from several popular playwrights who were actively working in that era.

In the mid-2010s, Temudo transitioned from being one of the popular actors on the Konkani stage to becoming a popular director within the same theatrical tradition. His directorial career commenced in 2000 with the play Suseg, following his tenure as the primary comedian working with the Konkani artist Roseferns, collaborating with the latter on several tiatrs. Although transitioning to focus on directing his own tiatrs, Temudo maintained his involvement in acting. While taking a break from his directing duties, he joined the ensemble of Konkani artist Mario Menezes, simultaneously presenting his own productions during the monsoon period. The pivotal moment in Temudo's career came in 2007 when he took the significant step of forming his own theatre troupe and directing his own tiatr, titled Sir. This production marked a turning point, establishing his directional abilities. Temudo credits the guidance and mentorship of actor-director Samuel Carvalho, in addition to his personal insights of demonstrating an understanding of the complexities associated with producing a tiatr, for his transformation from an actor to a director.

Temudo has produced several works that examine the issue of corruption in Goan society. His plays Police and Police-II illuminate the pervasive problem of corruption in law enforcement, showcasing both the prevalence of dishonest practices within the police force and the portrayal of upright and virtuous police officers. In a later tiatr named Public, Temudo directed his scrutiny towards the manifestation of corrupt practices within the realm of local panchayats. His 2013 work Corruption Kabar? (Corruption Over?) also addressed the theme of corruption, though the playwright rejected allegations that he simply reused material from his previous plays. In this tiatr, Temudo illustrated the struggles of a senior woman living in poverty, showcasing her interactions with mistreatment and dishonest actions within society. He also showcased how a rape incident could lead to the perpetuation of corrupt behavior. Through this play, Temudo suggested that corruption has permeated various spheres of Goan life, extending beyond just the political class. His body of work aimed to raise awareness about the widespread and systemic nature of corruption in Goa. His tiatrs depicted corruption as a societal problem, with common citizens also partaking in and perpetuating corrupt practices.

In September 2015, Temudo was nominated for and elected to the position of president of the Tiatr Academy of Goa (TAG). His appointment was reportedly facilitated by the support of Avertano Furtado, a local politician who was the Member of the Legislative Assembly (MLA) for Navelim at the time, a close aid of Temudo. His elevation to the TAG presidency drew criticism, as he was perceived to lack the requisite administrative expertise and academic credentials commonly linked with the position. The Goan Everyday, published an article by Melba Vas that characterized Temudo's tenure as a "death blow" to the TAG. Vas alleged Temudo of making decisions that showed preferential treatment towards certain tiatr performers while neglecting others, and that awards were granted based on the Temudo's personal preferences rather than merit. Furthermore, it was claimed that the organization's rules were modified to benefit Temudo and his supporters. In mid-2023, Temudo released a new tiatr production titled Past is Past. This work went on to achieve historic significance, as it was staged in the United Kingdom and Ireland, marking the first time a Goan tiatr had been performed in the latter region. The production's Goa debut was also generally well-received.

== Personal life ==
Temudo is married. He has two sons and a daughter. His son, Aidan later joined his father's theatre troupe as a trumpeter. While Temudo did not pursue tiatrist work as a full-time profession, he was employed at the Rosary College in Navelim for nearly two decades, starting in around 1998. In 2012, he was residing in his ancestral home located in Dongorim, Navelim. Later in the 2010s, Temudo relocated to London, UK, where he settled. He maintained close professional relationships with fellow Goan entertainers Comedy Queen Janet and Comedian Selvy, performing alongside them as part of a comedic trio.
