= Bernard de Aldona =

Indian composer and actor (1946–1983)

- Fernandes in an undated photograph
- Born: Bernardo Vitorino Fernandes; 25 March 1946; Aldona, Goa, Portuguese India
- Died: 6 July 1983 (aged 37); Aldona, Goa, India
- Occupations: Composer; singer; actor; playwright
- Years active: 1960s–c. 1983

Bernardo Vitorino Fernandes (25 March 1946 – 6 July 1983), known professionally as Bernard de Aldona, was an Indian composer, singer, theatre actor, and playwright who worked on the Konkani stage.

== Early life ==
Bernardo Vitorino Fernandes was born on 25 March 1946 in Aldona, Goa, which was part of Portuguese India during the Portuguese Empire (now in India). He was born to João Celestino Fernandes and the farmer Ana Felicia Rosaria Fernandes, into a Goan Catholic family.

== Career ==
Fernandes was a composer known for his morally uplifting songs, which garnered admiration from audiences. Two of his most memorable compositions include "Uddon Gelem" and "Hatan Dile Dandde." Fernandes established a successful musical partnership with Carmo Rod, and their duets received acclaim from patrons of the tiatr, a popular form of Goan theater. In addition to his musical talents, Fernandes showcased his acting prowess in tiatrs produced by figures such as Nelson, Jacint Vaz, Alfred Rose, C. Alvares, Prem Kumar, and Remmie Colaco. Notably, his songs continue to be broadcast by All India Radio. Throughout his lifetime, Fernandes demonstrated his creative versatility by authoring numerous tiatrs, with two of his popular works being Kitem Amcho Estad (What is our state?) and Zalach Paije (It should happen).

== Death ==
On 6 July 1983, Fernandes died at the age of 37 due to complications related to alcoholism at his home in Goncoi, Aldona in Goa.

== Legacy ==
During various occasions, Fernandes was honored and remembered for his contributions to the Konkani stage. One such event was the monthly program called "Somplolea Tiatristancho Ugddas" organized by the Tiatr Academy of Goa (TAG). In March 2012, the program took place at the conference hall in Campal, Panjim, where Fernandes, along with other esteemed figures including J. P. Souzalin, Dioguinho D'Mello, Anthony D'Sa, Aristides Dias, Greg, Allen Costa, Inacio de Canacona, and Cajetan D'Souza, were honored and remembered.

The following year, in March 2013, another tribute was paid to Fernandes at the monthly program "Somplolea Tiatristancho Ugddas," held at Ravindra Bhavan in Margao. Similarly, in March 2014, Fernandes was remembered at the same program, which took place at the Black Box in Ravindra Bhavan, Margao.

In March 2015, the Tiatr Academy of Goa organized the monthly program "Somplolea Tiatristancho Ugddas" to commemorate the tiatr artists born in March who had died. Fernandes was among those remembered during this occasion.

Fernandes's contributions were also acknowledged beyond the realm of remembrance events. In May 2016, his songs were included in the repertoire played during the all-Goa Konkani solo singing competition called "Mhozo Tallo Aikat." The competition, organized by The Goa Cultural and Social Centre, Mil-Mel-Nel Productions, and Clube Vasco-da-Gama, was held at Institute Menezes Braganza in Panjim and featured participants from different age groups.

Lastly, in March 2019, Fernandes was once again remembered at the Tiatr Academy of Goa's monthly program "Somplolea Tiatristancho Ugddas," held at the Black Box in Ravindra Bhavan, Margao. This particular event also honored other late artists born in March, including J. P. Souzalin, Dioguinho D'Mello, Anthony D'Sa, Aristides Dias, Greg Fernandes, Cajdon D'Souza, Allen Costa, Inacio de Canacona, John Nazareth, Patricio Pereira (Patrick Perry), Caetano Gomes, Antonette De Calangute, Anil Kumar, Peter Gomes, and Jose C Braganza.

== Selected stage works ==
Year	Title	Role	Notes	Ref
	Kitem Amcho Estad	Writer		
1960s	Zalach Paije	Writer		

== Select discography ==
- Uddon Gelem
- Hatan Dile Dandde
