= Krishna Moyo =

Indian theatre actor and singer (born 1919)

- Born: Krishna Laxman Moyo; 1919; Bicholim, Goa, Portuguese India
- Citizenship: India (from 1961)
- Occupations: Actor; comedian; singer-songwriter; playwright
- Years active: 1950s–1970s
- Notable work: Kombekar João; Don Bailancho Ghov; Bolkavancher Gozali

Krishna Laxman Moyo (born 1919) was an Indian theatre actor, comedian, singer-songwriter, and playwright known for his work in tiatr productions and radio programmes.

== Career ==
Moyo was a popular Goan cultural figure known for his pioneering work in Konkani music and theater during the mid-20th century. At the time, the realm of Konkani kantars, a form of song tradition, was predominantly led by Christian artists. He broke new ground as the initial Hindu artist to engage in singing and preserving Konkani kantars. His original compositions, including "Kombekar João", "Naka Vochonk Kashinat", "Krishna Mojem Nanv", and "Mogan Uloi", gained popularity among Goan audiences. In addition to his musical contributions, Moyo achieved a significant milestone by becoming the inaugural Hindu to undertake the production and staging of tiatrs, a traditional style of Goan theater characterized by an all-Hindu ensemble. Two of his well-received tiatr productions were Kombekar João and Don Bailancho Ghov (Husband of Two Wives). The Antruzi dialect of the Romi Konkani language is derived from the linguistic heritage of the Ponda region in Goa. Moyo was part of the generation of Antruzi playwrights who attempted to build upon the foundational work of earlier pioneers in this literary tradition, such as Shenoi Goembab and Acharya Naik, though the success of these efforts was uneven. Overall, Moyo played a pioneering role in expanding the participation of Hindu artists within the traditionally Christian-dominated Konkani performing arts scene in Goa during the mid-20th century.

Information regarding Moyo's participation in tiatrs, a traditional form of Goan theater, is relatively scarce in the historical record. Available evidence suggests that he played roles as a performer in both amateur and professional tiatr productions. One documented appearance by Moyo was in a 1957 staging of the tiatr Aiz Ratri (Today's Night), written by playwright Jacinto Vaz. This performance took place on November 17 as part of the feast of the Guardian angel in the town of Sanvordem, Goa. In this production, Moyo was cast in a comedic role. Moyo also had a part in another tiatr titled Maca Nacat Tuje Sat Lak (I Don't Need Your Seven Lakhs), directed by C. A. Gomes. This two-act performance featured Moyo performing comedy routines alongside established tiatrists Dioguinho D'Mello and Jacinto Vaz. This theatrical production was dedicated to honoring a student who achieved the 1st rank among their peers at Guardian Angel High School in the S.S.C exams held in that academic year. While the broader scope of Moyo's involvement in the Goan tiatr tradition remains unclear due to limited documentation, these examples demonstrate that he made contributions as a comedic actor in significant theatrical works during the mid-20th century in the region.

In the post-liberation period of Goa, several playwrights contributed significantly to the Konkani tiatr (theatrical performance) scene. Moyo was recognized as a figure among Hindu tiatrists in the Konkani theatre scene, contributing significantly to the development and influence of Konkani tiatr performances. He was part of a group of Konkani playwrights active in the years after Goa's liberation, which included figures like Pundalik Dando, Vinay Surlakar, Chandrakant Parsekar, and Ramkrishna Zuankar. These writers helped revitalize and enliven the Konkani theatrical tradition through their dramatic works. Despite the contributions of playwrights such as Moyo, the 1987 Encyclopaedia of Indian Literature, authored by Amaresh Datta, noted that the Konkani theater scene had not yet seen the emergence of a truly "great and original dramatist". The Konkani theatre was still developing and in need of more acclaimed dramatists to emerge from the region.

In the 1970s, Moyo participated in radio programs broadcast by Akashvani, India's national public radio service. On 18 March 1972, Moyo was credited as a contributor to the Konkani-language radio program Chavder, which translates to "program" in English. The specific title of the program was Bolkavancher Gozali, which means "Gossips at the Porch". This was a family-oriented serial created by Professor Keshav Narayan Barve. Moyo appeared alongside other participants Geeta Sardesai and Narahari Valvaikar. The program aired on Akashvani in Panaji, the capital city of Goa, at approximately 6:30 pm. The Bolkavancher Gozali serial had previously debuted as early as 16 January 1971. During those initial broadcasts in 1971, Moyo was featured along with Shrirang Narvekar, Manik Rataboli, and Lata Khanvte. On 10 June 1972, Moyo again participated in the Bolkavancher Gozali serial, this time alongside Vishnu Kapadi, Shrirang Narvekar, and Sharayu Kirtani. On this particular broadcast, the program included an interview with individuals who had benefited from family planning initiatives.

== Personal life ==
There is not much information available about Moyo's personal life. According to the 2010 book When the Curtains Rise by retired Goa University professor André Rafael Fernandes, Moyo was born in the year 1919 in the town of Bicholim, Goa, which was then part of Portuguese India during the Portuguese Empire (now in India). Speaking more about his character qualities, Fernandes describes Moyo as "dear to the Goans". From Bicholim, Moyo would travel to Panaji, which was 26 km (16 mi) away for work during the early 1970s. During this period, he was cast in a radio program on Akashvani titled Bolkavancher Gozali (Gossips at the Porch).

== Selected works ==
=== Tiatrs ===
Year	Title	Role	Ref
1957	Aiz Ratri	Comedian	
1950s or 1960s	Maca Nacat Tuje Sat Lak	Comedian	
	Kombekar João	Writer	
	Don Bailancho Ghov	Writer	

=== Radio programme ===
Year	Title	Role	Language	Ref
1971–1972	Bolkavancher Gozali	Participant	Konkani	
