= João Inacio =

Indian actor and composer (1921–1978)

- De Souza in the attire of Primeiro-cabo
- Born: 2 July 1921; Vasco da Gama, Goa, Portuguese India, Portuguese Empire (now in India)
- Died: 1 June 1978 (aged 56); Vasco da Gama, Goa, India
- Occupations: Actor; composer; singer; playwright; theatre director
- Known for: Playing the role of a Portuguese police officer in tiatrs

João Inacio De Souza (né Inacio; 2 July 1921 – 1 June 1978) was an Indian theatre actor, composer, singer, playwright, and theatre director who worked on the Konkani stage.

== Career ==
De Souza, a figure in the realm of Goan musical theater known as tiatr, had a career intertwined with the Mormugao Port Trust (M.P.T; presently referred to as Mormugao Port Authority) in the city of Vasco da Gama, Goa as stated by writer Fausto V. da Costa in the book TIATR 125th Anniversary Commemorative Volume. While there is limited information available about De Souza, his contributions as a playwright and performer are known. De Souza's talent as a tiatrist, or tiatr performer, was evident in his portrayal of various character roles, including those of a landlord (bhattkar), a traditional farmer (kunbi), and individuals belonging to the Hindu community. However, it was his portrayal of a Portuguese police officer or First corporal of the Portuguese Army (Primeiro-cabo) that garnered particular acclaim. De Souza's command of the Portuguese language, authoritative voice, authentic police uniform (fardamento), and distinct style contributed to his excellence in this role. His performances in popular tiatrs such as Nelson Afonso's politically themed Nationalist and the popular Almas de Outro Mundo (Souls from Another World) showcased his memorable depiction of the Portuguese police officer character archetype. In addition to his skills as a performer, De Souza displayed prowess as a composer and singer, specializing in Konkani kantaram (songs).

De Souza's musical contributions extended beyond solos, encompassing trios, quartets, and quintets, which solidified his standing as a popular figure in tiatr side-shows. Several of De Souza's compositions, including "Kazar Borem" and "Sukh Bhogxi," were recorded by the British record label His Master's Voice. De Souza was a multifaceted artist known for his contributions as a playwright and director in the realm of tiatr, a popular form of musical theater in Goa. His works encompassed several tiatrs, including Kumpar Mhojer Demand Kela (Lover has demanded me), Sukh (Happiness), and Kednach Polleunk Nam (Never did I witness), among others. Of particular significance was De Souza's theatrical production, Kumpar Mhojer Demand Kela, which served as a pivotal platform for the emergence of Antonio Francisco Fernandes, a Konkani actor and musician professionally known as Tony Sax. The tiatr was overseen by Konkani singer and composer Minguel Rod. Hailing from the city of Sanguem, Goa, Fernandes showcased his skills in this tiatr, leading to recognition from popular figures within the tiatr community. In June 1995, De Souza's impact on the tiatr landscape was further acknowledged when he was among those early tiatrists of the yesteryears who were featured in the 'List of artists that cannot be forgotten,' a compilation by writer and historian Wilson Mazarello, published in 2000.

== Personal life ==
João Inacio De Souza was born as João Inacio on 2 July 1921 in Vasco da Gama, Goa, which was part of Portuguese India during the Portuguese Empire. He was born to a single father, José Inacio, into a Catholic family who was settled in the city of Vasco da Gama at the time of De Souza's birth. On 1 June 1978, De Souza died in his hometown at the locality of Vaddem in Vasco da Gama, Goa.

== Legacy ==
On 25 July 2012, the Tiatr Academy of Goa (TAG) organized a monthly program entitled "Somplolea Tiatristancho Ugddas" at the Black Box, Ravindra Bhavan in Margao, Goa. The purpose of the event was to pay tribute to tiatr artistes who had died and had made significant contributions to the development of tiatr, a form of Goan musical theater. Alongside De Souza, the other popular artists who were remembered during the program were A. M. B. Rose, Aleixinho De Candolim, Domnick Vaz, Carmo Rod, Freddy J. Da Costa, Antonio Moraes, and Thomas Aguelino Fernandes (Peter Champion). Tiatr artistes John Claro and Tomazinho Cardozo, the former President of TAG, delivered speeches highlighting the accomplishments and artistic contributions of these late tiatr artistes. Additionally, Socorro de Santa Cruz, a tiatr performer, performed some of the songs composed by the deceased artists.

On 25 July 2018, the Tiatr Academy of Goa (TAG) organized a special program called "Somplolea Tiatristancho Ugddas" at the Black Box, Ravindra Bhavan in Margao. The primary objective of the event was to honor deceased tiatr artistes who were born in the month of July and to recognize their significant contributions to the field of tiatr. Alongside De Souza, the event commemorated the achievements and artistic legacies of A. M. B. Rose, Carmo Rod, Aleixinho De Candolim, Freddy J. Da Costa, Miss Julie, Antonio Moraes, Dominic Vaz, Peter Champion, John Mestri, Frank Borges, Caetano Da Costa, Lawrence de Tiracol, and Maestro Josinho.

On 30 July 2019, the Tiatr Academy of Goa (TAG) organized the monthly program "Somplolea Tiatristancho Ugddas" at the Black Box, Ravindra Bhavan in Margao. The event served as a platform to remember late tiatr artistes who were born in the month of July and to acknowledge their significant contributions to the tiatr tradition. In addition to De Souza, the program paid tribute to A. M. B. Rose, Aleixinho De Candolim, Domnick Vaz, Carmo Rod, Antonio Moraes, Freddy J. Da Costa, Thomas Aquelino Fernandes (Peter Champion), Joao Sebastiao Sequeira (John Mestri), Francisco Borges (Frank Borges), Caetano Da Costa, Lawrence de Tiracol, Miss Julie, Maestro Josinho, Manoel S Noronha, and Bonaventure D'Pietro. The event featured performances by Ryan Borges and Nicia Delicia Gomes, who presented songs composed by the late artistes, accompanied by the musical arrangements of Melroy Rodrigues. Mafaldina Moreira from TAG provided live sketches of the late tiatr performers and also delivered the closing remarks on behalf of the organisation.
