= Sheikh Amir =

Indian impressionist (born 1961)

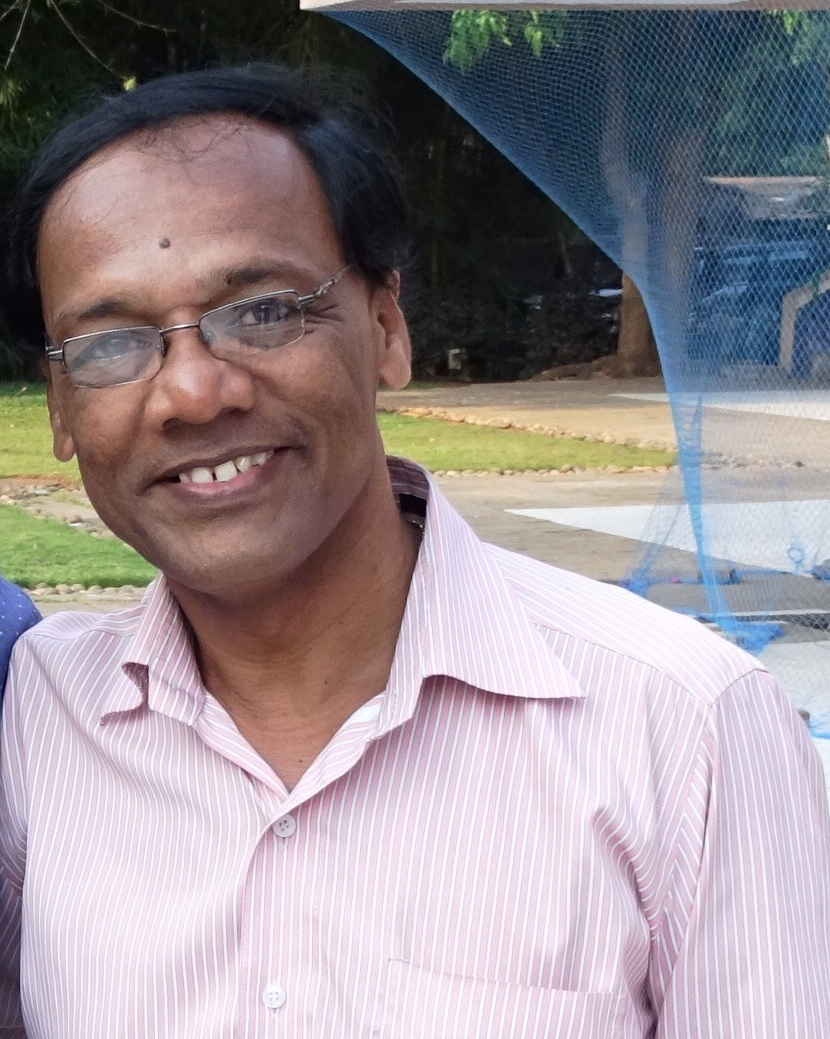
- Amirodin at the Kala Academy, 2015
- Born: Xec Amirodin; 11 November 1961 (age 64); Pangim, Goa, Portuguese India, Portuguese Empire (now in India)
- Other name: Xec Amir
- Education: Mahatme High School, Panjim
- Occupations: Impressionist; singer; actor; comedian; theatre director
- Years active: 1985–present
- Spouse: Anisa Xec
- Children: 2
- Awards: Kala Academy's (Best Actor, Singer, Comedian)
- Website: facebook.com/amir.sheikh.1422

Xec Amirodin (born 11 November 1961), known professionally as Sheikh Amir, (Note: alternatively spelt as Xec Amir or Sheik Amir.) is an Indian impressionist, singer, actor, comedian, and theatre director known for his work in Konkani films and tiatr productions. Referred to as the "Mimicry King", he is known for his versatile performances, having mastered the styles of 40 politicians and tiatr singers.

== Early life ==
Amirodin received his early education at Mahatme High School, Panjim. Throughout his school years, he actively participated in various stage performances and showcased his acting skills on Marathi stages. However, his passion for the Konkani stage eventually drew him towards that particular form of theater.

== Career ==
Amirodin was previously associated with the singer John F, accompanying him to his performances. In the theatrical production titled Vatt Chukli (Forgotten Way), directed by Premanand Sangodkar, Amirodin, a young and inexperienced artist, was entrusted with the opportunity to showcase his singing prowess through a solo performance. Despite initial apprehension about performing alongside seasoned veterans, Amirodin took the stage and delivered a lighthearted song that resonated with the audience, leading to the song being applauded and receiving four encores.

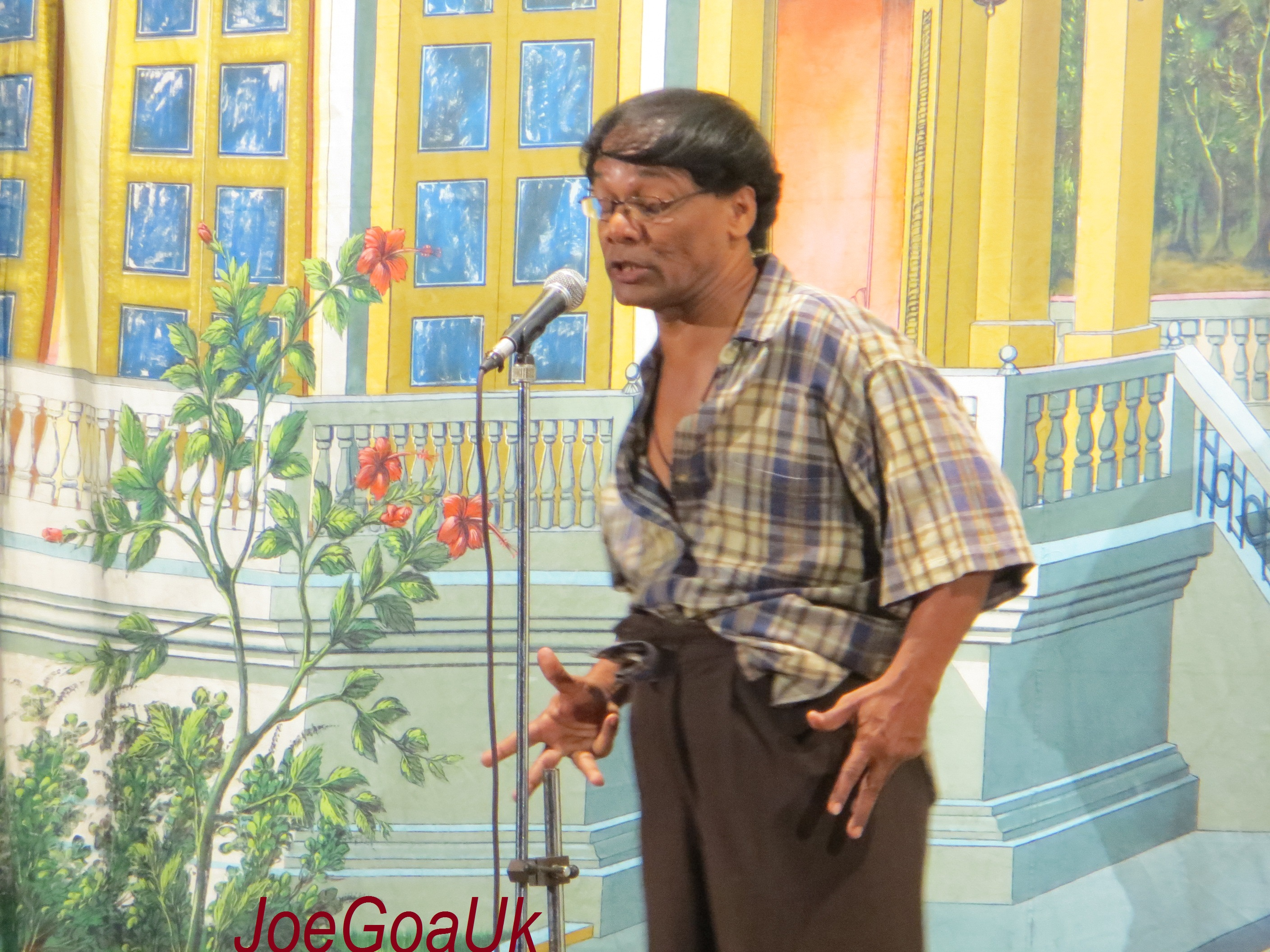
Amirodin during a performance at the tiatr Nit Onit at Candolim in 2013

Impressed by his performance, Sangodkar promptly secured Amirodin for the remaining shows of Vatt Chukli. Subsequently, Amirodin was cast by John Claro in the plays Vinglli Nachpinn (Naked Dancer) and Civil Kazar (Civil Marriage). However, it was Fr. Freddy J. da Costa who played a pivotal role in fostering Amirodin's acting career, providing guidance and encouragement. Collaborating with Jacinto Vaz, Amirodin formed a comedic partnership that delighted audiences in successful productions like Utt Goemkara (Wake-up Goan), Khata Pita Dev Dita (Eat, Drink for God Gives), and Goemcho Avaz (The Goan Voice)."

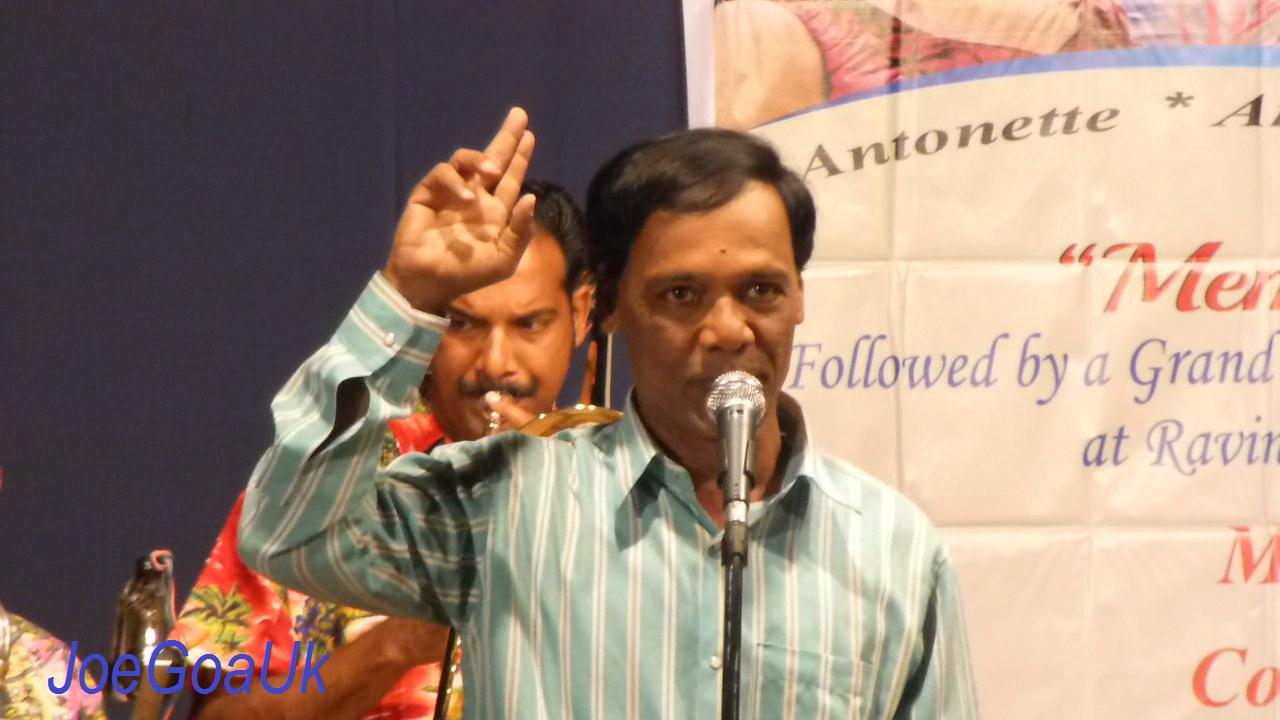
Amirodin performing at a felicitation event held at Margao in 2014

The untimely death of Jacinto Vaz left Amirodin without a mentor and performance companion. Nonetheless, Amirodin persevered in his acting pursuits, participating in local shows and frequently joining forces with Tomazinho Cardozo whenever the writer-director took part in the Kala Academy Tiatr competition. Amirodin possesses a talent for imitating a diverse range of artists and politicians. Encouraged by Fr. Freddy, he began showcasing his mimicry skills on the Konkani stage, providing an additional source of amusement for the audience. Since 2008, Amirodin has garnered widespread acceptance from the Konkani drama spectators, who exhibit enthusiasm while witnessing his performances. His achievements include successful appearances in productions such as Anil-Olga's Chimtti Bor Samball and Hem Zhadd Dudvanchem, as well as the opportunity to act and mimic in dramas helmed by the director Mario Menezes.

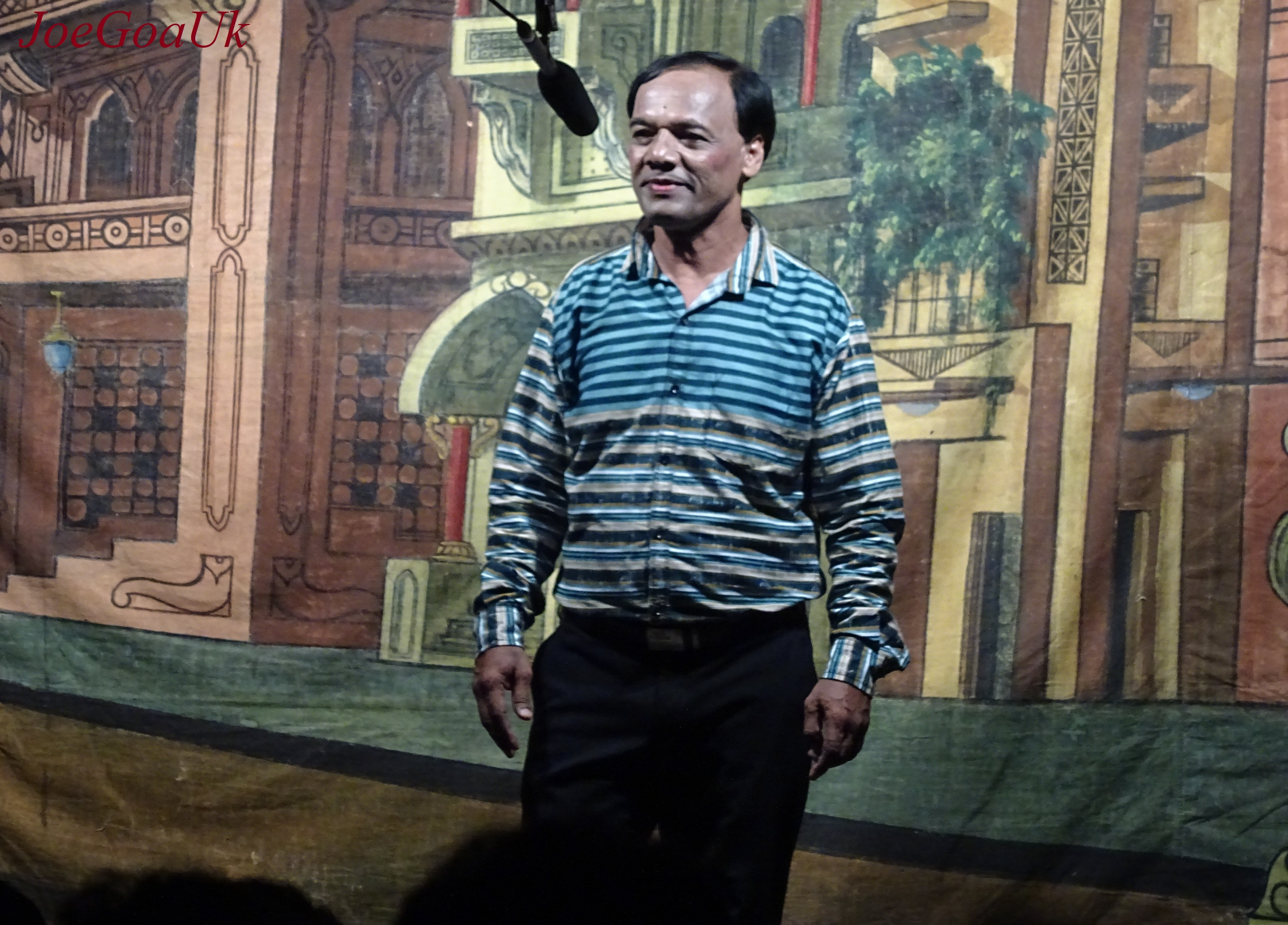
Amirodin performing in Francis de Tuem's tiatr Question Mark in 2016

Participating in productions like Ghorabeache Vantte (Division of Family) and tiatr Hi Maim Konnanchi has established Amirodin as one of the leading entertainers in this domain. Additionally, he has made brief appearances in films like Caetano Pereira's Ghat (Betrayal) and Socorro de Santa Cruz's Fashion. Amirodin expresses his appreciation for the tiatr platform, which has allowed him to explore cities such as Mumbai, Bangalore, Delhi, Dubai, and Kuwait. Grateful for the guidance provided by John F in introducing him to the Konkani stage, the support and encouragement from Fr. Freddy, and the mentorship of Mario Menezes in instilling discipline and refining his performances, Amirodin acknowledges the contributions of various directors who have aided his journey.

== Personal life ==
As of 2012, Amirodin was reported to be residing in Corlim, Goa. He resides with his wife Anisa. He has two children, Anif and Ameera.

In a June 2017 interview with O Heraldo, Amirodin shed light on his approach to embodying characters on stage. He stressed the significance of capturing the essence of the individuals he portrays through his vocal techniques and mannerisms. Amirodin asummed the role of prime minister of India Narendra Modi for his performance in the tiatr production ICU Bed No. 2.

Amid discussions of his solo performances, Amirodin expressed reservations. Regarding the readiness of Goan audiences for hour-long shows delivered solely in Konkani, the regional language. He articulated that his typical stage appearances involve playing a role for a duration of 15 to 20 minutes, followed by a change in costume to present a new comedic act. Amirodin emphasized the importance of maintaining versatility on stage, believing that performing a one-character show with a single costume would present challenges. Additionally, he expressed a fondness for singing, drawing inspiration from artists such as M. Boyer, Jacint Vaz, and H. Britton, yet acknowledged that this endeavor necessitates the accompaniment of a skilled keyboardist.

Amirodin encourages aspiring newcomers to uphold professional integrity and contribute towards elevating the standards of Konkani theatre. Furthermore, he appeals to parents to nurture their children's talents and actively promote their engagement in the Konkani stage, emphasizing the importance of imparting musical education alongside.

== Awards ==
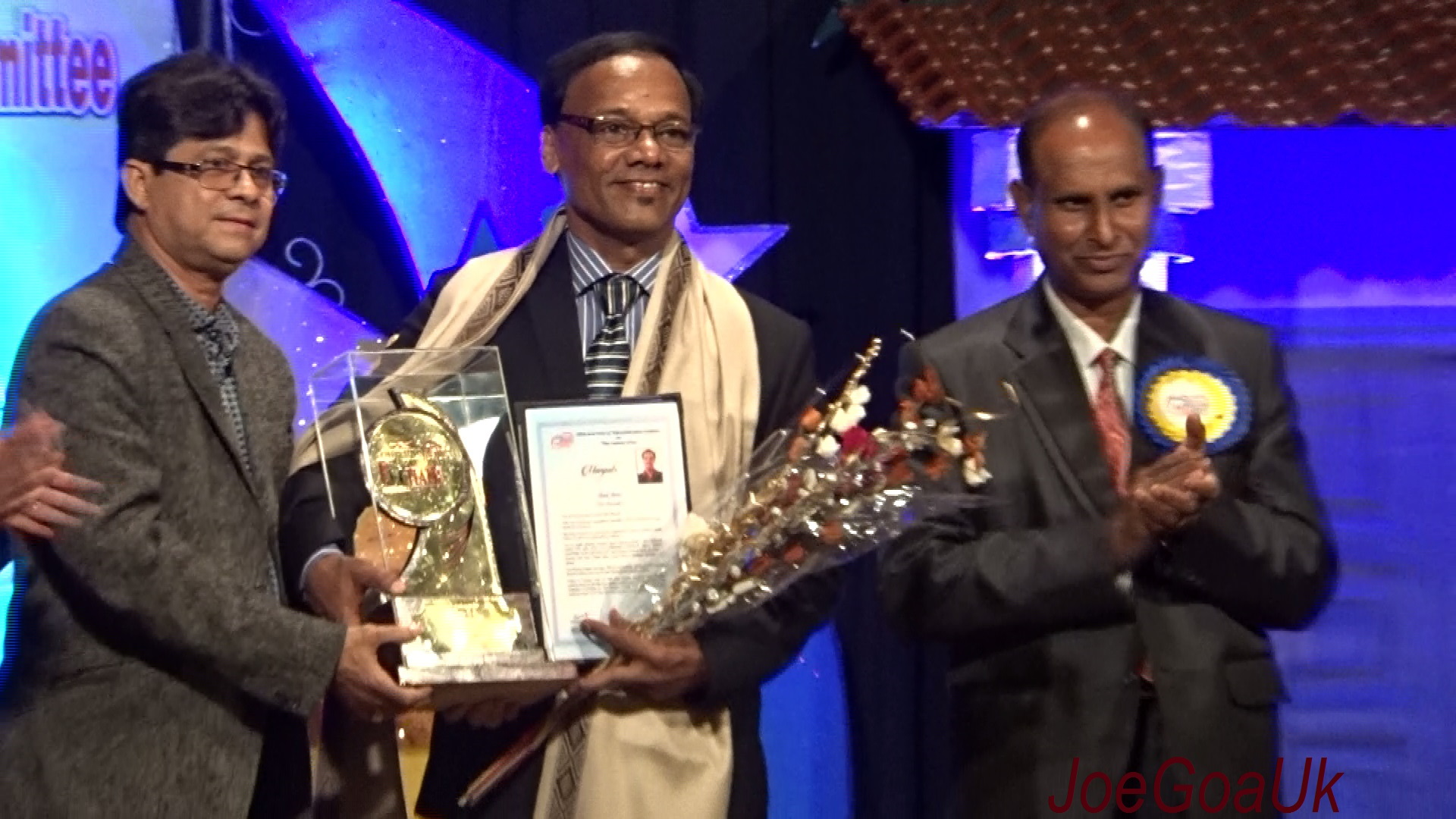
Amirodin being felicitated at the Institute Menezes Braganza, 2017

Apsvarthi was a one-act play written by Carlos Fernandes, known for its performances, particularly by Amirodin. Throughout his career, Amirodin has been recognized with numerous accolades, winning the Best Actor award 24 times. In addition to these achievements, he has also received Kala Academy awards in categories such as Best Actor, Best Singer, and Best Comedian. Amirodin's talent has been acknowledged and celebrated by organizations like 'KalaMogi', Candolim, as well as the 'Kala Mogi' in Kuwait, and he has been honored at the International Film Festival of India (IFFI).

== Selected filmography ==
=== Video films ===
Year	Title	Role	Notes	Ref
	Ghat	Bit role		
2007	Fashion	Bit role		

== Selected stage works ==
Year	Title	Role	Notes	Ref
1985	Vatt Chukli	Singer	Debut tiatr	
1980s–1990s	Utt Goemkara	Singer	Debut as an impressionist	
	Vinglli Nachpinn			
	Civil Kazar			
	Khata Pita Dev Dita			
	Goemcho Avaz			
2002	Chimtti Bor Samball			
2005	Hem Zhadd Dudvanchem			
2008	Ghorabeache Vantte	Jacint uncle	Also singer	
2008	Hi Maim Konnanchi			
2012	Bai Juan		Director	
