= Tiatr =

Type of musical theatre popular in Goa, India

Tiatr (English: theatre; Portuguese: teatro) is a type of musical theatre that is popular in the state of Goa on the west coast of India, as well as in Mumbai and among the Goan expatriate communities in the Middle East, United Kingdom, and other cities with a significant presence of Konkani speakers. The plays are primarily performed in the Romi Konkani dialects and incorporate elements such as music, dance, and singing. Individuals who perform in tiatr are referred to as tiatrists.

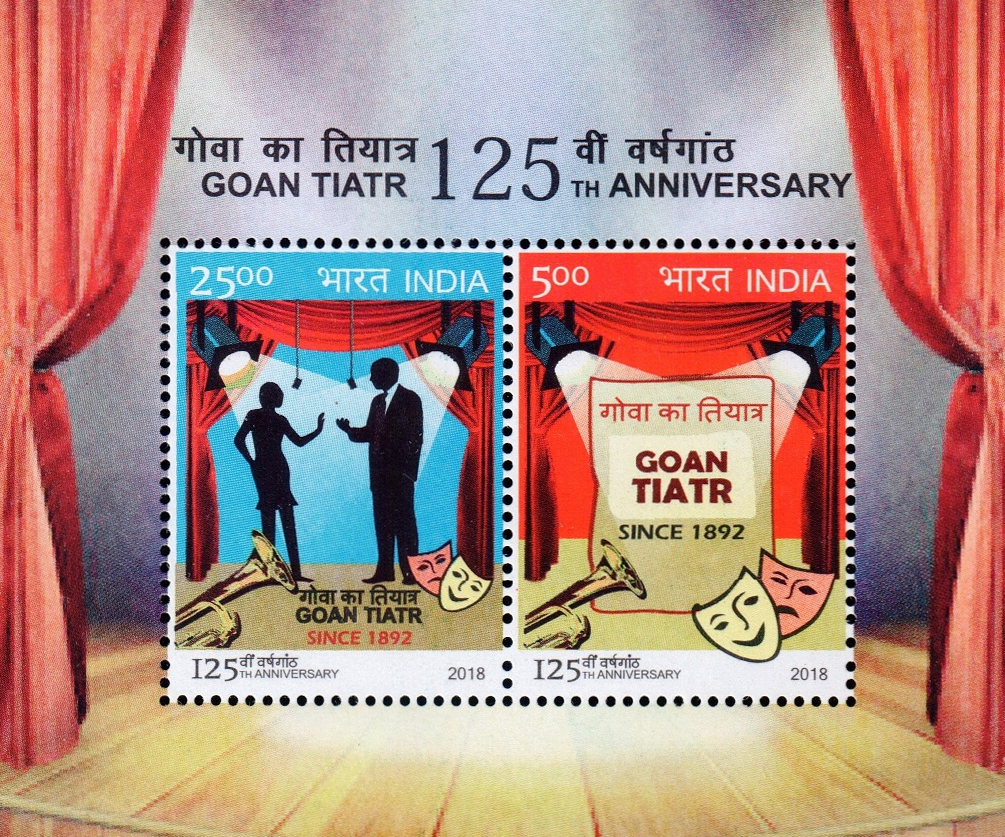
2018 stamp sheet dedicated to the 125th anniversary of the Goan tiatr

== Etymology ==
The word tiatr comes from the Portuguese word for theatre, teatro. Earlier variations of the word were theatro, thiatro, and tiatro.

== History ==
During the 19th century, Goa was known for its theatrical performances called zagor and khell. These musical plays were staged outdoors in various public spaces such as street corners, village centers, and open areas. Zagor was primarily popular in North Goa, particularly in Bardes, while khell found its audience in South Goa, particularly in Salcete. Initially, these performances focused on social themes and were free from controversy and negative criticism. However, towards the end of the 19th century, the zagor form of entertainment gained popularity in Bombay, attracting the interest of North Goans. Unfortunately, this form of entertainment was considered crude and vulgar, leading to the embarrassment of the more affluent Goans residing in Bombay. They faced ridicule and mockery from non-Goans, which prompted the middle and upper classes in Bombay to shift their attention to English and Portuguese dramas.

Lucasinho Ribeiro, who was from Assagao, was seeking employment in Bombay. Passionate about the performing arts, he was highly impressed with the stylised Italian operas performed there. He took up a job for an Italian opera troupe which was touring Indian cities at the time, staging an opera called Italian Boy. When the troupe left India, Lucasinho Ribeiro bought the costumes used in the play with the intention of staging a Konkani play on the style of the Italian Opera. His collaborators in the effort were Caetaninho Fernandes of Taleigao and João Agostinho Fernandes of Borda, Margao.

On Easter Sunday, 17 April 1892, the first-ever tiatr performance, Italian Bhurgo, adapted from the Italian play, was staged at the New Alfred Theatre, Bombay. This day is celebrated as Tiatr Dis (Tiatr Day). Hence, the Goan art form of tiatr was the product of the meeting of Goan culture and the opera of Italy. Since there were many different scenes in this tiatr and it required different stage sets, they thought of dropping the curtain and performing songs and dances in front of it. This was needed to entertain the audience while the stage setting was being done behind the curtain. These songs and dances did not have any relevance to the theme of the play.

The first original tiatr script was written and directed by João Agostinho Fernandes in 1895 in Bombay and was titled Belle de Cavel or Sundori Cavelchi. For all his consistent devotion and encouragement over fifty years, Fernandes was conferred the title Pai Tiatrist (Father Tiatrist). Regina Fernandes, wife of the playwright João Agostinho Fernandes, became the first female tiatr actor in Bhattkara on 22 November 1904. Divorce, a tiatr written and directed by Airistides Dias, was the first konkani tiatr to complete 100 performances on 5 October 1980.

However, as time passed, the standard of zagor as well as Khell deteriorated in quality with the introduction of elements of vulgarity. Educated people stopped patronising the zagor as well as the khell. While tiatr was growing in popularity, its original forms – the zagors and the khells – were slowly fading away; the zagor completely stopped being performed while the khells continued.

In 1956 the khell underwent a dramatic change. Given its state at that time, Antonio Moraes thought it fit to take the khell from the street performance to a stage performance. Helped by his friend and colleague Antonio Marian, the khell was performed on a stage for the first time with a backdrop and other paraphernalia associated with theatre. The first khell tiatr, Sandlolo Put, written and directed by Antonio Moraes, was staged on the third day of Carnival of March 1956. However, this form became very popular only in the 1970s when Rosario Rodrigues coined the term khell tiatr and came up with extremely successful shows. Thus, the ground-based plays known as khells evolved onto the stage and further into 'non-stop dramas'. They have now generally dropped this label and are generally referred to as tiatrs.

Tiatr contributed to keeping the Konkani language alive during Portuguese colonial rule, when Konkani was suppressed. Tiatrists played a major role in the struggle to make Konkani the official language of Goa.

In 2007, the Government of Goa started the Tiatr Academy of Goa to facilitate the development of tiatr. In 2008 legislation was approved granting 15 lakh (1,500,000) rupees to the newly formed Tiatr Academy of Goa.

== Description ==
Tiatr today focuses on social, religious, and political themes, serving as a reflection of Goan culture. The drama is divided into six or seven acts, known as pordhe, which are interspersed with songs. These songs aren’t always directly connected to the plot or issues of the main drama, and usually, two or three songs are performed between each act.

Tiatrists have always demonstrated a very high degree of social awareness. Most of the themes of tiatr are concerned with social problems confronting the people. Despite centuries of Portuguese suppression and post-liberation neglect from the state governments, tiatr as an art form has not just survived but thrived and reinvented itself in many ways.

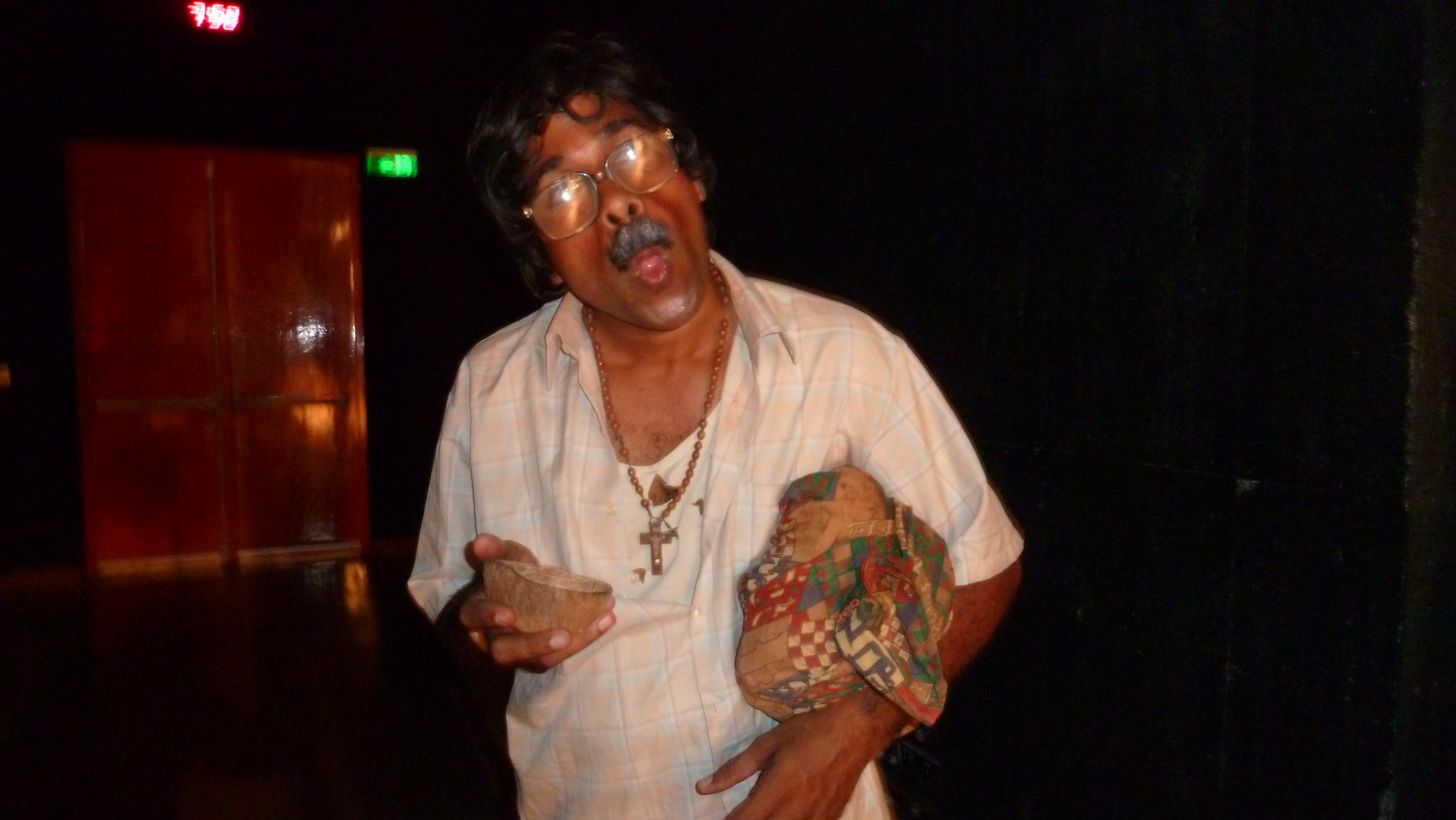
A tiatrist during a performance, 2011

Tiatr as a dramatic form has been traditionally dominated and patronised by the Christian community, but over the years several young Hindu artists have been performing in the tiatr, which are also seen by people from the Hindu community.

=== Songs ===
Songs integral to the plays are known as kants. Other songs, called kantaram, are generally either comedic or based on topical, political and controversial issues that are interspersed through the performance. These musical interludes are independent of the main theme of the play. The songs are often satirical and unsparing of the politics and politicians of Goa. The music is provided by a live band including keyboard, trumpet, saxophone, bass guitar and drums.

== Khell Tiatr ==
A variant of tiatr, called khell tiatr, is performed exclusively during the festivals of Carnival, Intruz, and Easter. Unlike the traditional Konkani tiatr, khell tiatr integrates its songs into the main drama, ensuring that the content of the songs does not deviate from the story.

== Modern-day tiatr ==
Besides the regular commercial shows, tiatrs are held as part of the celebrations of nearly every church and chapel feast in the state. The Goa Kala Academy organises a state-level tiatr competition every year while the Tiatr Academy organises a popular tiatr competition for dramas which has exceeded 25 performances. Tiatr songs and performances are recorded and sold on CD and DVD in Goan and Middle Eastern markets. Although efforts have been made to preserve the art form as a tradition of Goa, there have been calls for greater recognition of Mumbai-based tiatrists.

== List of tiatrists ==
Some of these names are from an article on the GoaWorld.com website.

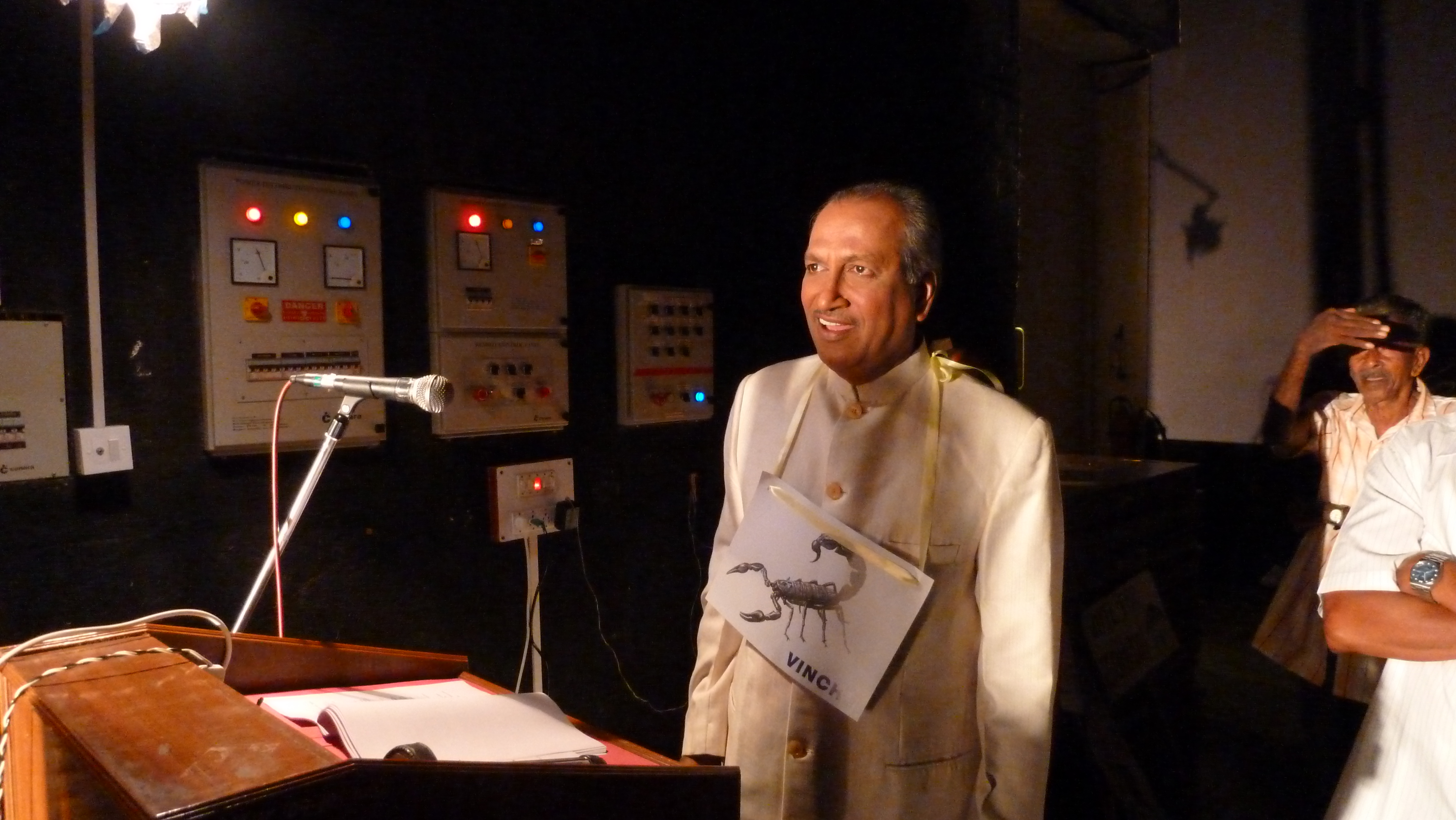
Tomazinho Cardozo, the first president of Tiatr Academy of Goa

=== Past tiatrists ===
- A. J. Fernandes
- A. M. Pacheco
- Agapito Xavier
- Agnelo Lobo
- Alex de Sanvordem
- Aleixinho de Candolim
- Alexinho de Maxem
- A. F. Souza Ferrão
- A. R. Souza Ferrão
- Alfred Rose
- A. M. B. Rose
- Andrew Fernandes
- Anil Kumar
- Annie Quadros
- Anthony De Sa
- Anthony Carr
- Anthony Mendes
- Antonette De Calangute
- Antonette Mendes
- Antonio Francisco de Gauravaddo
- Aristides Dias
- A. S. Conception
- Augustine Rebello
- Bab Peter
- Babush Fernandes
- Bernard de Aldona
- Bernard de Parra
- Betty Ferns
- Betty Naz
- Bom Jezu
- Bushan Rodrigues
- Christopher Leitao
- Comedian Selvy
- C. Alvares
- Comedian Marcus
- Caitano Milagres Fernandes
- Caiti
- Cajetan Pereira
- Carmo Rod
- Cecilia Machado
- Champion Alvares
- Champion Peter
- Crista Furtado
- Milagres Fernandes
- Clara Dias
- Clemmie Pereira
- Miss Julie
- Star of Oxel
- Cyriaco Dias
- Damiao D'Costa
- Derrick Mendes (Mendes Bros.)
- Dennis Simoes
- Diogo Cardoz de Khobravado
- M. Dod de Verna
- Dummulo de Gauravaddo
- Ernest Rebello
- Effie
- Emmy Fernandes (Colva)
- Felix Mendes (Mendes Bros.)
- Filipe Dias
- Flora Mendes
- Francis de Parra
- Francis de Verna
- Francis Xavier Mendes
- Francis Tembo
- Nevel Gracias (Vel'lekar)
- Genevieve
- Greg de Souza
- H. Britton
- J B Rod
- J. P. Souzalin
- Jacinto Vaz
- Jephsis Hitler
- Jessie Dias
- Pai Tiatrist
- João Inacio
- Jose Rod de Parra
- John Claro
- John Dias (Candolim)
- Johnny de Saligao
- Jose Rod
- Josephine Dias
- Julius Noronha
- Junior Rod
- Maestro Josinho
- Kid Boxer
- Krishna Moyo
- Lajea Da Costa
- Laverent Pereira
- Lawrence de Tiracol
- Leena de Anjuna
- Lucasinho Ribeiro
- Lucian Dias
- Luis Martins
- Luiza Fernandes
- M. Boyer
- Manuel Noronha
- Marceline de Betim
- Marian Rodrigues
- Mario de Colva
- Mario de Navelim
- Mario Menezes
- Master Ingnatius de Mapusa
- Master Vaz
- Mastor
- Matthew Araujo
- Meena Leitao
- Menino de Bandar
- Minguel Rod
- Mike Mehta
- Miss Marekin
- Mohana Cabral
- Nelson Afonso
- Olavo Ernesto Gomes
- Ophelia Cabral
- Patrick Dourado
- Paul Romy
- Peter Gomes de Umtavaddo
- Peter V Fernandes
- Philomena Braz
- Philu de Aldona
- Platilda Dias
- Prem Kumar
- Premanand Lotlikar
- Querobina Carvalho
- Remmie Colaço
- Rama
- Rico Rod
- Rita Rose
- Robin Vaz
- Roglo Naik
- Romaldo D’Souza
- Romeo Mendes
- Roam Tony
- Rosario Rodrigues
- Rosario Agnelo Dias
- Rosary Ferns
- Saib Rocha
- S Lemos
- Sabina Fernandes
- Salvador Souza
- S.B. Radio
- Seby Coutinho
- Shalibai
- Shalini Mardolkar
- Sharon Mazarello
- Shrirang Narvekar
- Souza Boy
- Souza Guião
- Star of Curtorim
- Star of Arossim
- Succurine Fizardo
- Sandra Dias
- Teotonio D’Costa
- Thomas Andrade
- Thomas Coogan
- Titta Pretto
- Tomazinho Cardozo
- Tony Call
- Tommy Alvares (J. S. Alvares) Brother of C. Alvares – Sangolda
- Tony King (Anthony Alvares), son of Champion Alvares
- Tony Martins
- Victor de Calangute
- Vincent de Saligão
- Vincent Fernandes (Murganv Bondr)
- Vincy Quadros
- Wilson Mazarello
- Willy Fernandes
- Xavier Mendes (Mendes Bros.)
- Young Chico
- Young Menezes
- Young Mendes
- Vincente Fernandes (Sezapai)
- William de Curtorim
- Bab Kistu de Calangute
- Cajetan de Sanvordem
- Silva de Benaulim

=== Active tiatrists ===
- Abee Simoes
- Afileo Fernandes
- Aggi Rod
- Agnelo Borim
- Agnelo Lobo
- Agnelo 'Nel'
- Agnelo Vailantonio Lobo
- Agnes D'Silva
- Agostinho Mascarenhas
- Agostinho Temudo (Comedian Agostinho)
- Aires de Arambol
- Albert Cabral
- Aleixinho Fernandes (Tiatr Writer, Merces)
- Aleka Velora Cardozo
- Alex Rodrigues
- Alexin de Morjim
- Alfi de Divar (Alfredo Fernandes)
- Alias Fernandes
- Alicia Crasto
- Alijoy Fernandes
- Alison de Curtorim
- Aliston Colaco
- Alister Costa
- Aliston Colaco
- Aliya Kimberly Cardozo
- Aliva Angel Cardozo (child artist)
- Aliya Kimberly Cardozo
- Allwin Colaco
- Alria Rose D'Souza
- Amresh Kamat
- Andre Brazinho de Souza
- Andrea D'Souza
- Andrew de Utorda (Ava Trio)
- Aniceto Ferns (Parra Boys Trio)
- Aniceto Lourenco
- Anil Pednekar
- Anna Pereira
- Anneli Pereira and Avila Pereira
- Anthony Agnelo Vaz
- Anthony Carr
- Anthony Cardoso
- Anthony Chico
- Anthony D'Costa
- Anthony de Ambajim
- Anthony de Velim
- Anthony D'Souza Anthony Kindla
- Anthony Fernandes Ambajim
- Anthony Furtado
- Anthony San
- Antonette de Maina
- Antonette de Ponda (Antonette Mendes)
- Antonio Caridade Salvador (ACS) Vaz
- Antonio Vaz (Colva)
- Antony Kindla
- Antush D'Silva
- Aplon
- Aplonia Rebelo (Felcy'gue bhoin)
- Ariff Correia
- Aristides (Lucian Dias'acho bhav)
- Armando Mascarenhas
- Arnaldo Costa
- Ashben Cardozo (Musician)
- Assumptin
- Augustine Coelho
- Augustine Mascarenhas
- Augusto Morais (Musician)
- Ave Dsouza
- Aveena Pereira
- Avers Pereira
- Avila Pereira
- Avito Fernandes (Tiatr Director and Writer, Merces)
- Avito Pires de Menezes
- Avlon Avy Rodrigues (Avy Boy Parra)
- Bab Andrew
- Baba Cielo
- Babit de Zuari
- Baltazar Pontes
- Baptist Crasto
- Basilio Pires
- Bella Coutinho
- Ben Evangelisto
- Benny de Aldona
- Benny Mendes
- Betty Alvares
- Benzer Fernandes
- Bladwin D'Silva
- Bonny de Alvim
- Bonny Pereira
- Braz de Parra
- Brendon Rato
- Bricila Fernandes
- Bryan Fernandes
- Bunu de Areal
- Bushan Rodrigues
- Braz de Parra
- Bunty Vaz
- Bushka Bringel
- C. D'Silva
- Caitan Braganza
- Cajie D'Costa (Curtorim)
- Cajy Pereira
- Cameron Fernandes
- Candida D'Souza
- Candida Mascarenhas
- Canon D'Souza
- Capucina Alvares
- Caridade Fernandes—Carrie
- Carmina Barbosa e Sequeira
- Carmo Judas Savio Pacheco
- Catrina Gomes
- Celesta Pereira
- Celina Fernandes
- Celina Simoes
- Cezar D'Melo
- Chitra (nee Shirwaikar) Afonso
- Cia Clancy Fernandes
- Cielda Pereira
- Cinnet
- Ciril Andrade
- Clarissa Fernandes
- Claude Farrier
- Clemmie Pereira
- Clinton Martins
- Coly-col de Velim
- Colleen Fernandes
- Comedian Agnelo Baida
- Comedian Allwin
- Comedian Ambe
- Comedian Aston Soares
- Comedian Aurelio
- Comedian Bebo
- Comedian Bryan
- Comedian Cassy Travasso
- Comedian Costy
- Comedian David
- Comedian Domnic
- Comedian Dylan
- Comedian Glanny Miranda
- Comedian Inacio Furtado
- Comedian Jallu Daniel
- Comedian Jesus
- Comedian Jimmy
- Comedian Joyel
- Comedian Julius
- Comedian Kenny (Kenny Raison Fernandes)
- Comedian Lino
- Comedian Mathew de Souza
- Comedian Michael
- Comedian Nato
- Comedian Philip
- Comedian Preet
- Comedian Princy
- Comedian Richard
- Comedian Rosario (Alex Rosario de Melo)
- Comedian Ryston
- Comedian Sally
- Comedian Seby de Colva
- Comedian Soccor Silva
- Comedian Steven
- Comedian Xek
- Comedienne Aveena Pereira
- Comedienne Betty (Fernandes e Sequeira)
- Comedienne Cassy Travasso
- Comedienne Dorothy Camara
- Comedienne Elita
- Comedienne Flavia Baretto
- Comedienne Jane
- Comedienne Janet
- Comedienne Joana
- Comedienne Sandra Colaco
- Conception de Tuem
- Connie M
- Costantino Crasto
- Cresncio (Colva)
- Crista
- Cristina Baptista
- Cristina Vaz
- Crizaila Fernandes
- Cruz Coutinho - Cruz de Sanvordem
- Cruz Pinto
- Custodio Fernandes
- Cyril Almeida
- Cyril Andrade
- Cyril Fernandes
- Dacia Dias
- Danny de Ribandar
- David D’Costa (Devido D’Costa)
- Deeptesh Harmalkar
- Delisha Vaz
- Denver Sequeira
- Denzilia Menezes
- Dexter Furtado (Musician)
- Divino Almeida
- Dolly Anna Miranda
- Dolla (Dorothy) Mascarenhas
- Dolly Anna Miranda
- Domnic Bocarro
- Dominic Carvalho, Director
- Domnic Coelho
- Domnic de Macazana
- Domnic de Parra (Parra Boys)
- Domnic de Raia
- Domnic Barretto
- Domnic Fernandes (Kuwait)
- Domnic Fernandes (Domingos Fernandes), Raia
- Dominic Soares
- Donald Colaco
- Dorothy Mascarenhas
- Eddie Mascarenhas
- Eddy de Quepem
- Edrol Fernandes Musician
- Edwin D'Costa
- Effifanio Cabral
- Elaine Pinto
- Elffio Fernandes
- Elick Vaz
- Eleuterio da Costa
- Elvis Mascarenhas
- Elvis Sequeira
- Emiliano de Borda (Emilio Fernandes)
- Engelbert Rose
- Ester Noronha
- Evarist de Arambol
- Evola Couto
- F.X. Ferns (Nagoa, Salcete)
- Fatima D'Souza
- Fatima Fernandes
- Fausto V da Costa
- Felcy
- Francis de Dicarpale
- Francis Fernandes de Dabul
- Felcy
- Fermino Goes
- Filipe Almeida
- Flavio Barreto
- Fr Lucas Rodrigues
- Framton De Sa
- Francis Coelho
- Francis de Dicarpale
- Francis de Salcete (Fatorda)
- Francis de Tuem
- Francis Fernandes de Dabul
- Francis Rebelo
- Francis Xavier Mendes (Mendes Bros.)
- Francisco Fernandes MC
- Francisco Fernandes (Utorda)
- Francisco P Fernandes
- Francisco Pinto
- Frank Carr
- Franky Gonsalves
- Franky Oliveiro
- Frazer Fernandes
- Freddy D'Souza
- Frenwin Fernandes
- Gable Ferns
- Gabie Ferns
- Gable (Gabriel) D'Souza
- Gasper Crasto
- Gennifer Corriea e Marshall
- George Gonsalves
- Glanny Miranda
- Gloria Ferrao
- Godwin Afonso
- Grachel Mascarenhas
- Gracy Rodrigues (Ribandar)
- Greg Carvalho
- Greg de Parra (Parra Boys)
- Grina Pereira
- Hayzel Gonsalves
- Hendry Lobo
- Holly Rodrigues Musician
- Hortencio Pereira
- Humbert
- Ignatius de Xelvon
- Irene Cardozo e Vaz
- Ivan Fernandes
- Jack Rodson
- Jackson Mascarenhas
- Jaison Dias
- Jalson Pacheco
- James Vaz
- Jennifer Fernando
- Jenny de Germany
- Jeremiah Vaz
- Jerson Fernandes
- Jesba Fernandes
- Jessica Gomes
- Jesus Antao
- Joao de Zuari
- Joaquim Aguiar
- Joaquim da Costa
- Joaquim Joseph D'Costa
- Joe Dicarpale
- Joe Rose
- Joe Valent
- Joesan Afons
- John D'Silva
- John Fernandes
- John Miranda
- Johnny Diniz
- Joicelan Furtado
- Jolrisha
- Jonathan Diniz (Jonny Boy)
- Jonny Boy (Jonathan Diniz)
- Jose de Agasaim
- Jose Evon
- Jose Mascarenhas
- Jose Santos (Colva)
- Joseph de Parra
- Joseph Fernandes (Joe Wallace)
- Joylita Silveira
- Joywin Fernandes
- Jr Anthony Luis
- Jr. Nelson
- Jr Reagan
- Julius Noronha
- Justiniano Fernandes
- Justiniano de Sanguem
- Justino de St Cruz
- Kenneth Zuzarte—Kenny
- Keny Raison Fernandes
- Kezia Carvalho
- Krisandra Hegde
- Lajea Da Costa
- Laneesa Mascarenhas
- Lanisha Vaz
- Laurente Pereira
- Laveena Vaz
- Lawrence Camilo
- Lawrence Mascarenhas
- Lawry Travasso
- Lenoy Gomendes
- Leslie Pereira
- Lester Fernandes
- Levon Fernandes
- Liana Remfina Rodrigues
- Liby Mendonsa
- Lino Fernandes
- Lisiano Rodrigues
- Lorna de Morjim
- Lourdin Fernandes
- Lucas Rodrigues (Colva)
- Lucy Lobo
- Luis Bachan
- Luis Fernandes
- Luis Xavier Mascarenhas (Xavier de Maina)
- Madonna Fernandes
- Manu
- Manu de Mandur
- Manuel Dias
- Manuel Fernandes
- Manuel Noronha
- Manuel Vales
- Marcus Vaz
- Maria Afonso
- Maria Lourdes Fernandes
- Mario Afonso
- Mario de Vasco
- Marissa Mendes e D'Costa (Curtorim)
- Mark Araujo
- Marlene Fernandes
- Martha D'Souza
- Martin de Ponda (Manuel Fernandes)
- Mathew Araujo
- Mathew de Souza
- Mathias Sequeira (Musician)
- Max Cabral
- Maxy Pereira
- Mayfern Mascarenhas
- Maythan Barreto
- Meena Goes
- Meena Leitao
- Meenaxi Chougale
- Meera Menezes
- Meeta
- Melisha Costa
- Melita Fernandes
- Melroy Fernandes
- Menini de Maina
- Menino Mario
- Menino de Bandar
- Menino de Maina
- Merrick Fernandes
- Michael Azavedo
- Michael Diniz
- Michael Martin (Zeemix Trio)
- Michael de Siolim
- Michael Gracias
- Minguel de Arambol
- Milagres de Bhatlem (Bhatlem Bab)
- Milagres de Chandor
- Minguel Dourado (M.Dod de Verna)
- Mini Mario
- Minoshka Fernandes
- Milagres de Chandor (Milagres R Gonsalves)
- Miss Clarissa Fernandes
- Mithun Mahambrey
- Moses de Divar
- Moses Gonsalves
- Myfanwy Sequeira
- Myron Correia (Jr. Selvy)
- Myron Estrocio
- Nacia
- Nancy Gomes
- Natasha Saldanha
- Nazareth Godinho
- Nazario Pinto
- Nelson Collaso, Sanvordem
- Neil Frazier
- Neves Oliveira
- Nicky Carvalho
- Nicky Mario da Silva
- Nolvert Cotta, Musician
- Norman Cardozo
- Normandez
- Ofelia D'Souza
- Olavo Gomes
- Olavo Peres
- Oldrin Sequeira
- Olga Vaz
- Ophelia de Arambol
- Osvi Viegas
- P Agnelo Fernandes
- Pascoal de Calangute
- Pascoal de Chicalim
- Pascoal Vaz
- Patricia Fernandes
- Patrick Dourado
- Patson Barbosa
- Paul Fernandes
- Pedro Rodrigues
- Peter da Costa
- Peter de Arambol
- Peter de Benaulim
- Peter de Betalbatim (Khell Director)
- Peter de Macazana (Pedru Souza)
- Peter de Merces (Pedro Romauldo de Souza)
- Peter de Pedda
- Peter Roshan
- Peter Xavier Mendes
- Peviolla Dias & Wilma Dias (Singing Siblings)
- Philip T. D'Souza
- Piety de Navelim
- Police Francisco
- Polly de Curtorim
- Pradeep Anand Naik
- Prakash Marathe
- Prasad Harmalkar
- Premanand Lotlikar
- Priscilla Mascarenhas
- Prince Jacob
- Princewell Fernandes
- Quenicio Pereira
- Ramiro Mascarenhas
- Raphael de Macazana
- Ramson Cardozo
- Raymond Rodrigues
- Raymond
- Reema Pereira
- Reggio
- Reginald de Panchwadi
- Reuben Lui Fernandes (child artiste)
- Reza Prisha Fernandes
- Ricardo John D'Silva
- Richard Colaco
- Rioma Menezes
- Risma Leitao
- Riston Gomes
- Rita de Merces
- Rita Lobo Landers
- Robert de Calvim
- Robert de Souza
- Roberto Rodrigues
- Roma
- Romaldin Barretto
- Romaldo Estrocio
- Romaldo Fernandes
- Romila Barretto
- Roneber Vales
- Rons Tavares
- Rosario Botelho
- Rosario de Benaulim
- Roseferns
- Roshan
- Rosy Alvares
- Roy de Chinchinim
- Roy Menezes, Musician
- Rozario D'Souza Jr. Kindla
- Russel Mascarenhas, child artiste
- S. Caitan
- Saby de Divar (Saby Dias)
- Salida Fernandes Dias
- Salu de Loutolim
- Salvador Afons
- Salvador Fernandes Salferns
- Salvador Silveira
- Sammy Fernandes, Betul
- Sammy Tavares
- Samuel Carvalho
- Sandeep Kalangutcar
- Sanford Carvalho
- Sanisha Vaz
- Sanyo Afons
- Satyawan Tari
- Savannah Mascarenhas
- Sculy
- Selvin de Siolim (Tiatr Writer and Director)
- Semenca Rebelo
- Semica Mascarenhas
- Senita Fernandes
- Senon DF Souza
- Sera Carvalho
- Sera Fernandes
- Shahu Almeida
- Shanice Vaz
- Sheena Gracias
- Sheikh Amir
- Shenaya Anita Pereira
- Shruti Naik
- Simon Gonsalves
- Simran Vas and Shanice Vas
- Sir Piety
- Slivia Gomindes
- Soccoro Silva
- Socorro de St Cruz
- Sonali Naik
- Sonia Dias
- Sonia Diniz
- Sonia Mandrekar
- Sonia Travasso
- Spirit Fernandes
- Steffi Goes
- Steffi Pereira
- Sunny de Colva
- Swizel Almeida
- Sylvester Vaz
- Tancia Pires
- Tanya Rebello
- Tatum D'Souza (Babli)
- Teotonio D'Costa
- Terence de Arambol
- Theodore Alvares
- Tina Travasso
- Tomazinho Cardozo
- Tommy Afonso Jr.
- Tony de Carmona
- Tony Cabral
- Tony de Ribandar
- Tony Dias Benaulim
- Tony Dias Musician
- Tony Dodd de Verna
- Tony de Ribandar
- Tony Rod
- Tony Sax
- Tracila Gonsalves
- Tracy de Calangute
- Tremson Savio Fernandes, Musician
- Ubaldo Fernandes
- Ulhas Tari
- Valentino Ezekiel Fernandes
- Valencio de Caranzalem
- Valerian de Aldona
- Valini Fernandes
- Vallecio Vaz (Colva)
- Velencio de Caranzalem
- Valencio de Colva
- Valency de Calangute
- Venita Salvina D'Costa
- Vicente Fernandes - Seza Pai
- Victor D'Cunha
- Victor de Ribander
- Vilban Pereira
- Vincy Menezes
- Vishal Gawas
- Vitorino Tavares
- Walter Martins
- Wilbur Rebello
- Willy Silveira
- William Xavier Fernandes
- Wilma Dias
- Xavier de Moira
- Xavier Mascarenhas
- Xavier de Maina
- Xavier Gomes
- Zeferino Dias (Zeemix Trio)
- Zelia D Souza e Rodrigues

== Gallery ==
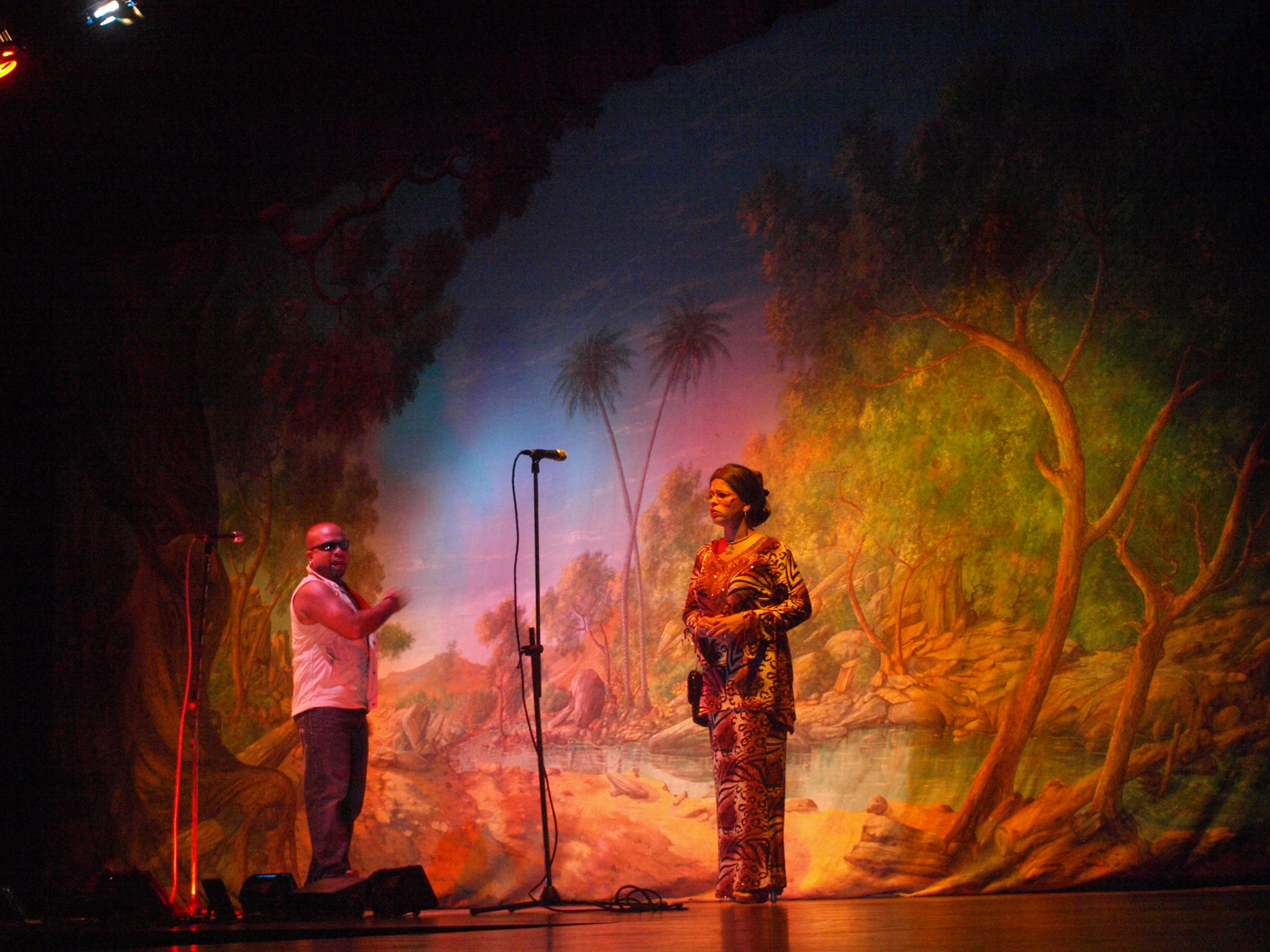
Tiatrists performing on stage, 2010

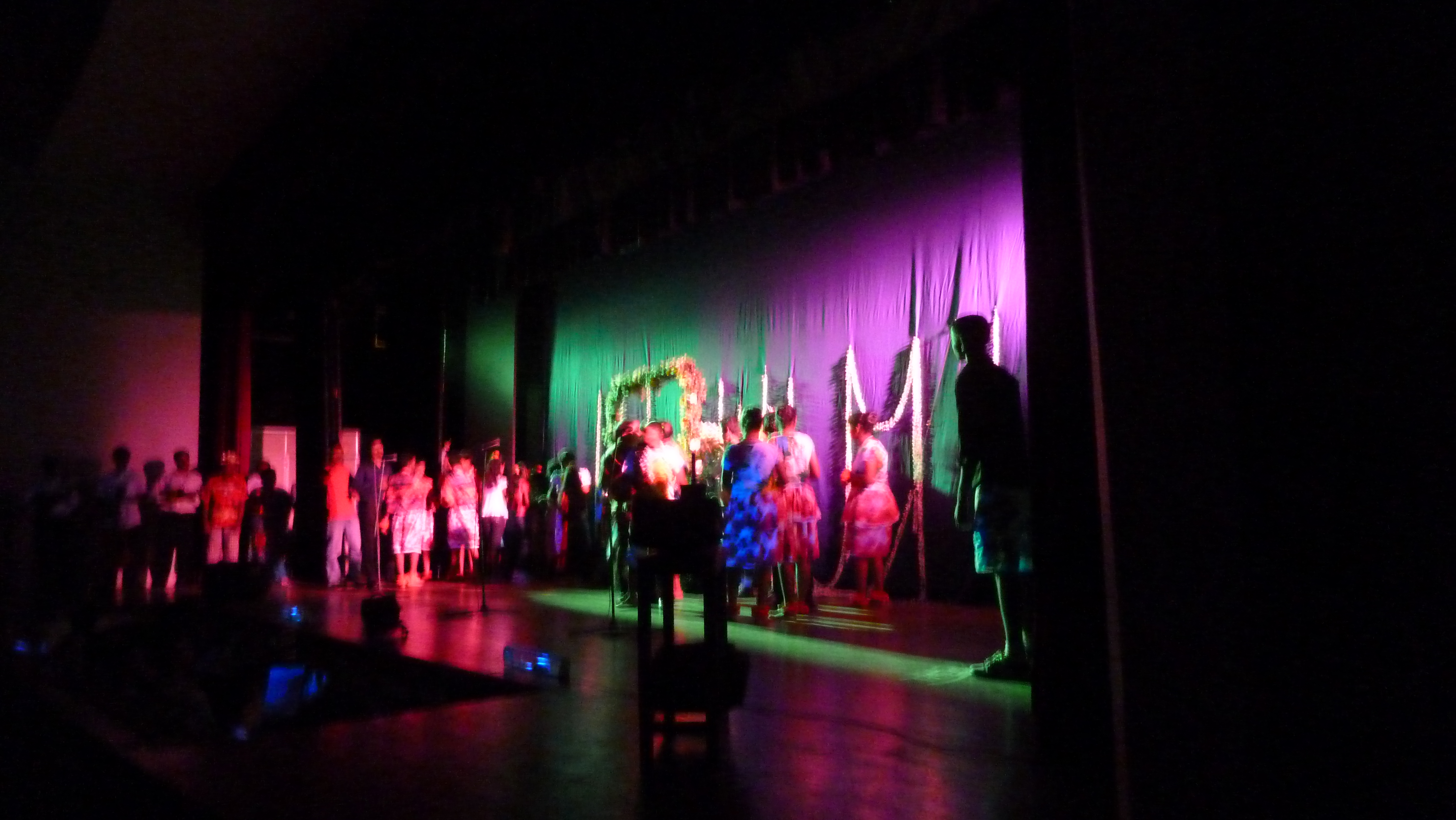
A tiatr performance, 2011
