= Comedian Marcus =

Indian comedian and actor (died 2020)

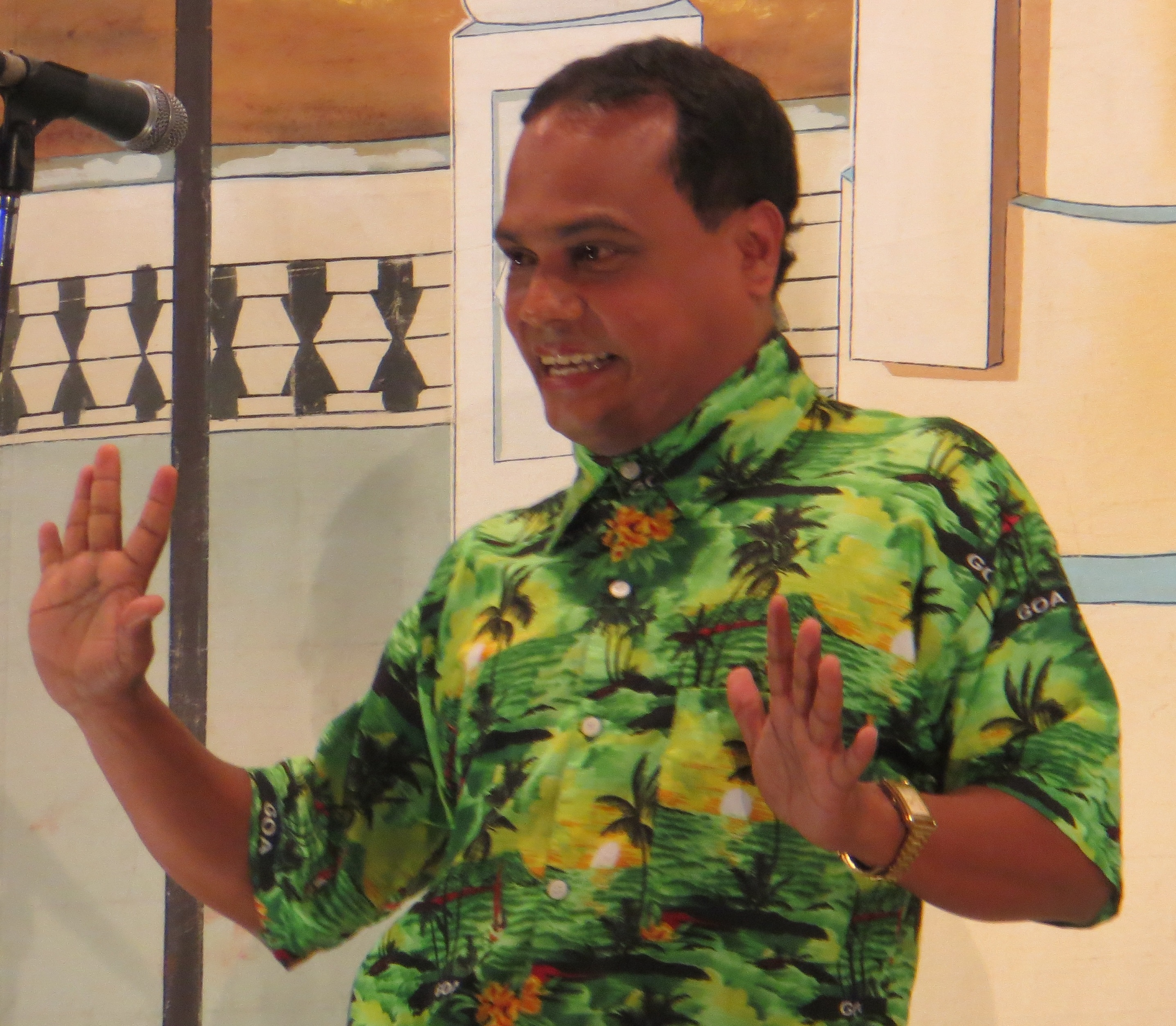
- Fernandes singing at the tiatr Kumsar, 2013
- Born: Marcus Fernandes; Cortalim, Goa, India
- Died: 21 February 2020; Goa Medical College, Bambolim, Goa, India
- Other names: Comedian Marcus de Cortalim; Comedian Marcos
- Education: Our Lady of Perpetual High School, Cortalim
- Occupations: Comedian; actor; singer; playwright
- Years active: c. 1996–2019
- Spouse: Fatima Fernandes
- Children: 1

Marcus Fernandes (unknown – 21 February 2020), known professionally as Comedian Marcus, was an Indian comedian, playwright, director, actor, and singer known for his work in Konkani films and tiatr productions. He began his career as a drummer, co-founding the band Key Notes. Fernandes made his debut on the tiatr stage as a child actor in Tem Tujem. He was particularly known for his humorous one-liners and gestures.

== Early life ==
Marcus Fernandes hailed from the ward of Thana in the village of Cortalim in Goa. Despite his parents, Caetano Fernandes and Fransqina D'Silva, not being involved in the realm of tiatr, Fernandes displayed a fervent passion for stage performances. This passion was evident even during his formative years at Our Lady of Perpetual High School in Cortalim, where he actively engaged in school programs, lending his vocal talents to various performances. Furthermore, Marcus's musical prowess extended to playing the drums, as he became a member of Key Notes, a band he co-founded with his close companions.

== Career ==
Fernandes first showcased his comedic abilities as a child actor in the tiatr production titled Tem Tujem (That is yours), directed by Sunny de Cortalim. Despite originally portraying a serious character, Fernandes received advice from an experienced individual who recognized his potential to bring laughter to audiences. Encouraged by this feedback, Fernandes joined Anthony de Velsao's troupe for carnival shows, where he honed his comedic skills and established himself as a proficient comedian. JP Pereira of The Navhind Times writes, over a span of more than two decades, Fernandes entertained enthusiasts of Konkani tiatr with his humorous one-liners and gestures. Known for his ability to generate genuine laughter without resorting to vulgarity, Fernandes collaborated with esteemed directors within the Konkani theater community.

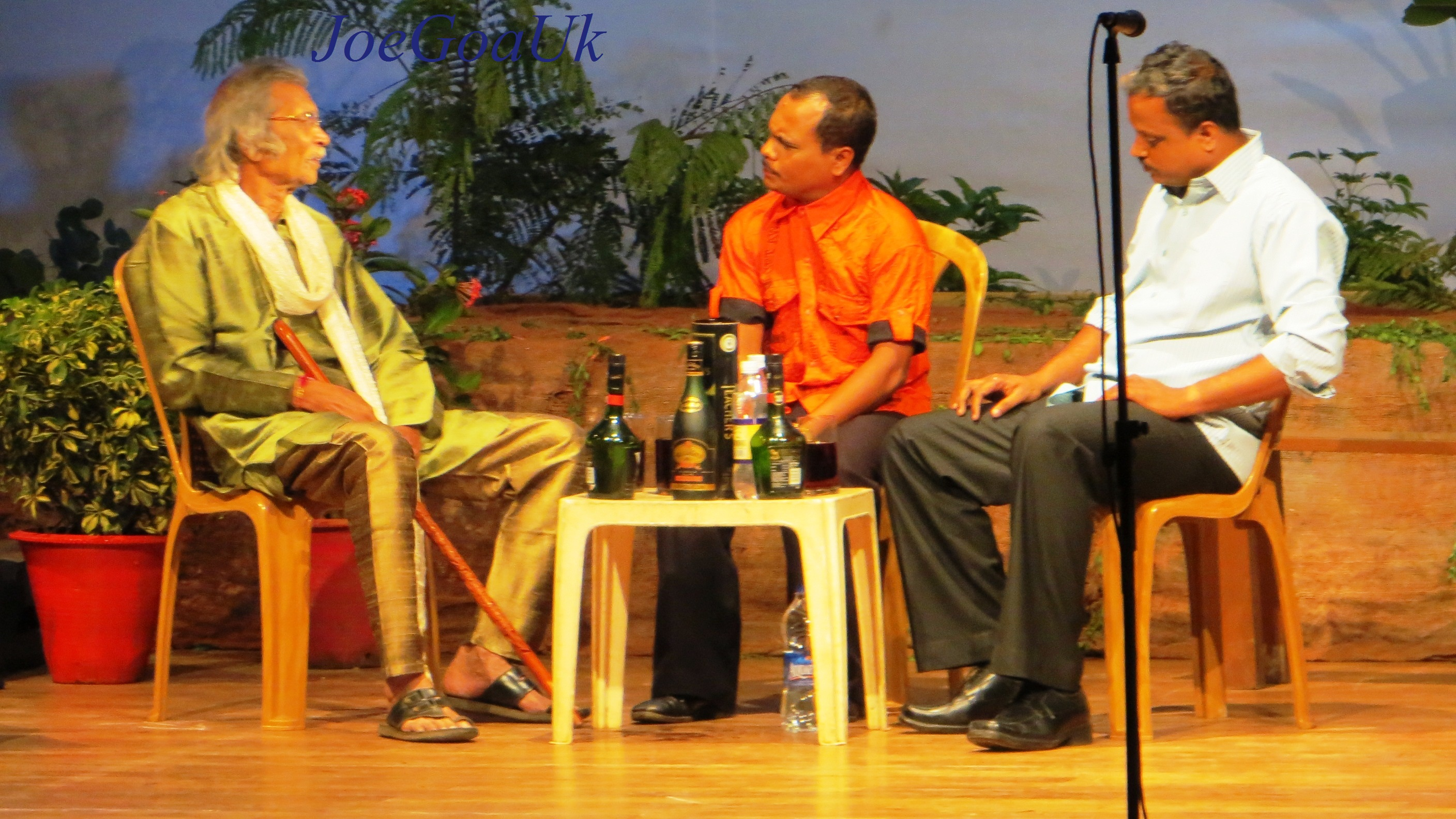
Fernandes during a performance at the tiatr Asson Nam in 2012

During his involvement in carnival shows, Fernandes caught the attention of Pascoal Rodrigues, who invited him to act in the play Matiechem Aidonn (Vessels of Clay). This marked Fernandes's debut on the professional stage, which led to subsequent collaborations with Rodrigues in productions like Nimanno Brestar (Maundy Thursday) and Koxtta Kantte. Fernandes also joined forces with Inacio de Canacona in performances of He Goenche Put (The Sons of Goa) and Tumkam Zai Toxem (What they want), among others. Directors such as Roseferns, Elvis-Carmen, Jr. Reagan, and Sr. Agnes also sought Fernandes's acting prowess for their respective projects.

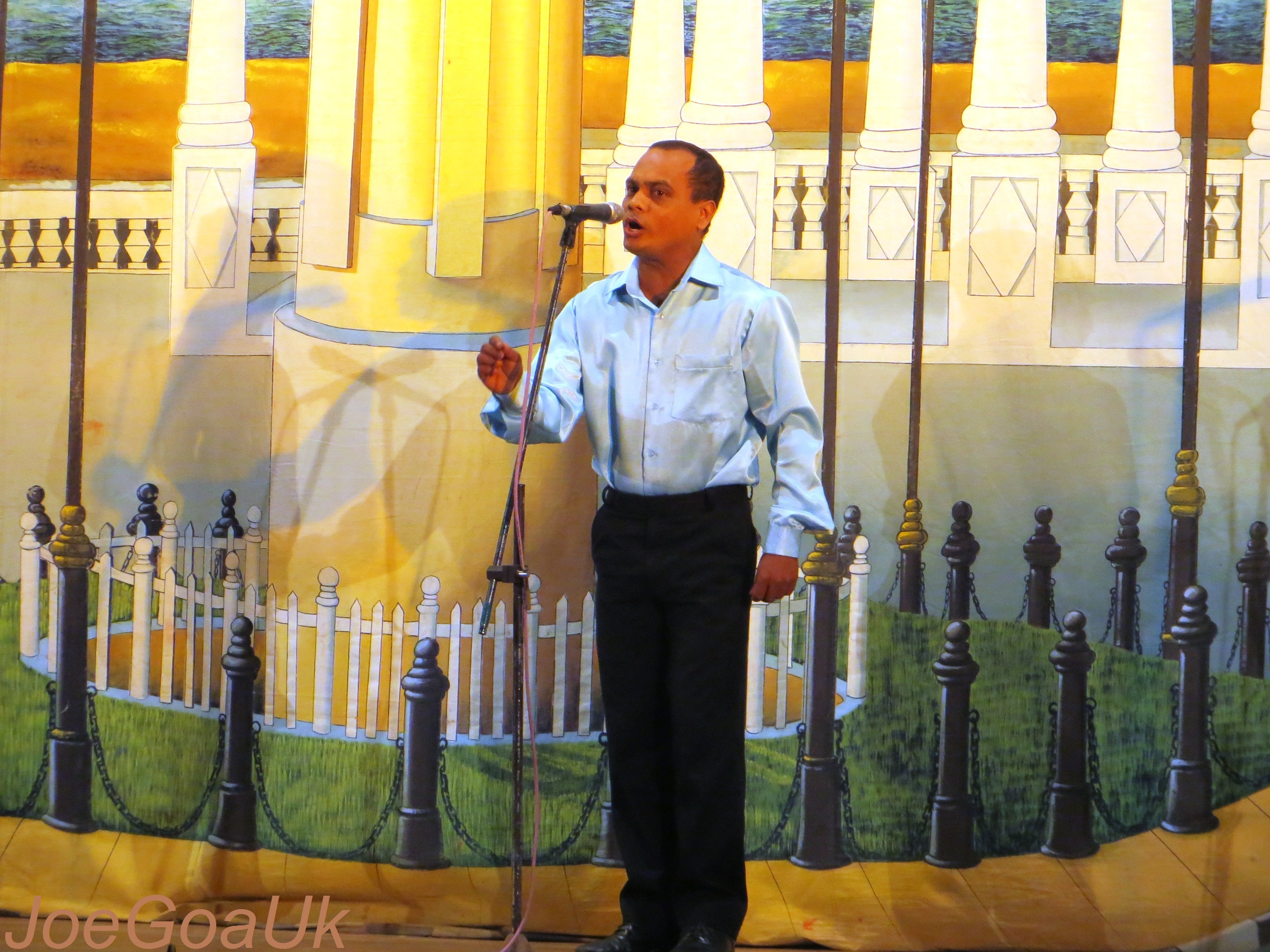
Fernandes during a performance at the tiatr Asumdhi in 2013

In 2016, Fernandes made his mark in the Konkani music scene by featuring in the inaugural Konkani audio album titled Rinn, produced by Bonifacio and Romitha Productions. He showcased his vocal prowess by lending his voice to various tracks, including the album's eponymous title song "Rinn." Fernandes also collaborated with Valensha on a duet called "Bhav Bhoinn," and joined forces with Ignatius de Xelvon and Rons for a trio performance titled "108." Additionally, he delivered a solo performance titled "Tondd Lipoita." Apart from his musical endeavors, Fernandes actively participated in the Kala Academy Tiatr Competition 2014–2015, where he competed in Group B with his play Tumi Kori Nakat (Y'all don't do it). His talent and dedication were recognized through several individual accolades he received during the competition. Furthermore, Fernandes demonstrated his acting skills by working with figures such as Cyril Almeida and the award-winning director Alfie Fernandes, appearing in productions like Pacharem (The Cage) and Paanz.

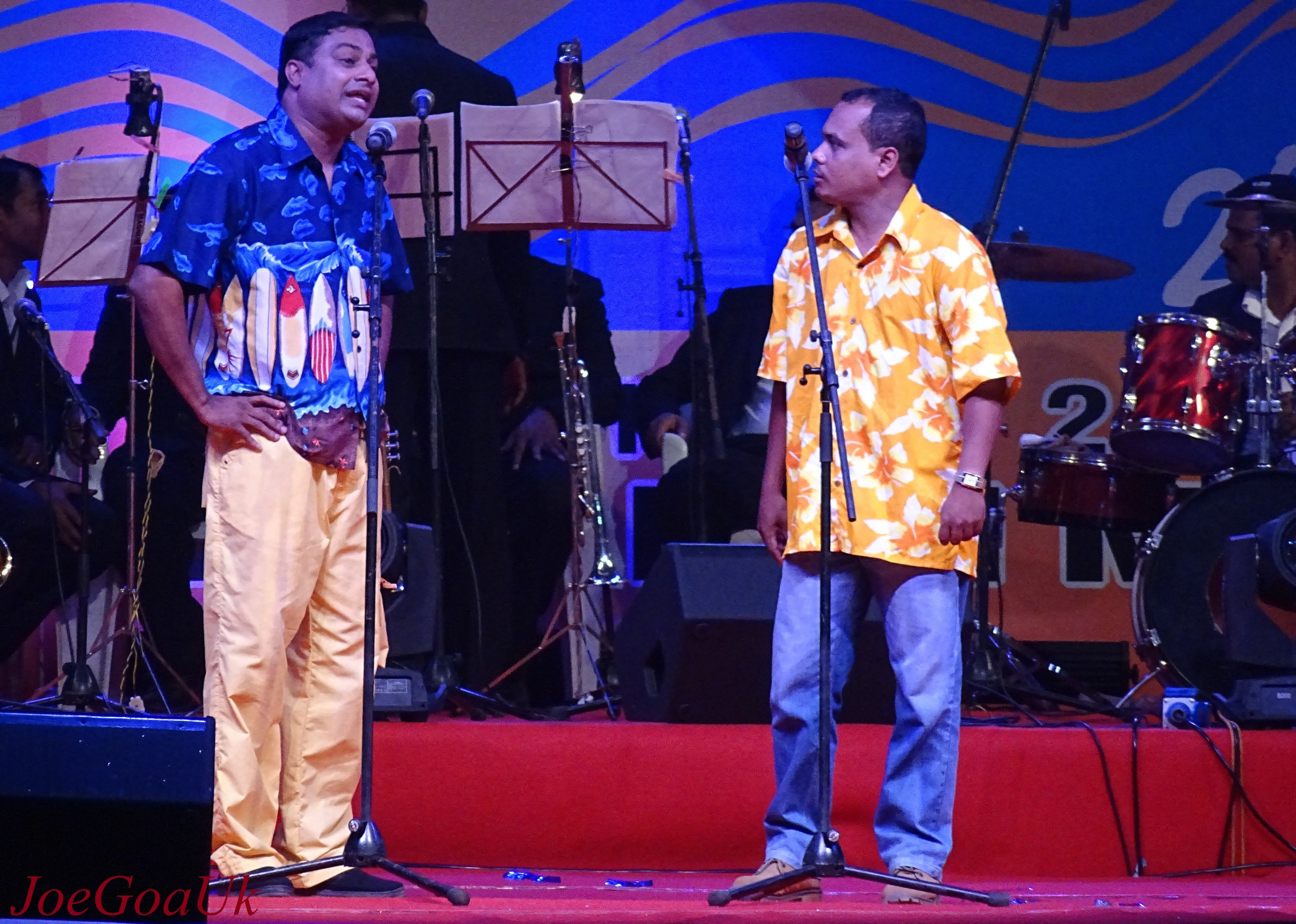
Fernandes during a performance at the 2015 Aqua Goa Mega Festival

In March 2018, Fernandes was enlisted by Jr. Reagan to join the cast of the theatrical production Happy Easter, a tiatr performance. O Heraldo writes, within the production, Fernandes collaborated with Joana, Saby, and Sally to form a comedic quartet, delivering entertaining performances on stage. Moreover, Fernandes participated in various musical arrangements, including trio performances alongside Joana and Saby, as well as engaging in quartet and duet compositions.

In November 2018, Fernandes garnered recognition for his contribution to the DVD production titled Paduacho St Anton (Vol. 95), masterminded by Edwin D'Costa. The DVD featured a diverse collection of 12 songs, encompassing solos, duos, duets, trios, and quartets. One of the featured duets, "Suseg Na," showcased Fernandes' collaboration with Reza, focusing on portraying the challenges encountered by a husband when facing disturbances from his spouse, even during leisurely occasions.

In June 2019, Fernandes became part of Comedian Sally's troupe, contributing to productions including Maim Paichem bessaum (The blessings of Mother and Father), Tumi Konank Zai (Who do y'all want?), and the 2019 show Eke Sunecho Kaido. Throughout his career, Fernandes remained dedicated to entertaining audiences and delivering performances in the realm of Konkani tiatr. In the same year, Fernandes participated in the tiatr production Eke Sunecho Kaido (The Daughter-in-law's Rule).

Fernandes also established himself as a proficient writer, contributing to the vibrant tradition of Carnival shows for a span of 15 years. Noteworthy among his creations were three plays that held a special place in his heart: Kalli Angostram (The Black Clothes), Tuka Lagon (Because of You), and Amkam Meulim (We Got Them). Unfortunately, his involvement in the Carnival performance of Comedian Sally's Mai Paichem Bessaum was marred by a stroke that necessitated his admission to the Goa Medical College (GMC). He made a successful recovery and later resumed collaborating with the same director on subsequent productions. Regrettably, due to his health setback, the Carnival shows had to be discontinued. In addition to his accomplishments in music and theater, Fernandes expanded his artistic portfolio by releasing four Konkani VCD films showcasing his talent in comedy sketches and songs. These films, titled Goodbye, Thank You Brother, Stop It, and Piso, further solidified his creative versatility. Furthermore, Fernandes nurtured his drumming skills under the mentorship of Assumption Nunes, a drummer from the ex-band INDIA, often finding joy in playing the drums for leisurely pursuits.

== Personal life ==
In addition to his involvement in the entertainment industry, Fernandes had a career at a school. He entered into matrimony with Fatima, and together they had a son named Anson. Under Fernandes's guidance, Anson pursued drumming and intended to receive formal music lessons. Throughout Fernandes's journey, his wife provided invaluable support to him.

Fernandes expressed his admiration for the director duo Elvis and Carmen, highlighting Elvis as one of the industry's top directors. According to Fernandes, Elvis possessed strong scriptwriting abilities, selects fitting titles for his projects, and assigns roles that showcase the talents of his actors. Additionally, Fernandes spoke highly of Comedian Sally, describing him as a skilled writer and director. He praised Sally's kind and understanding nature, emphasizing his respectful treatment of the entire group. Fernandes expressed his enjoyment of working under Sally's leadership.

On 21 February 2020, Fernandes died at Goa Medical College in Bambolim, Goa.

== Awards ==
Fernandes has been recognized and honored for his contributions to the field of comedy and singing in the tiatr (a form of Goan musical theater). At the 31st Tiatr Competition (2005–2006) organized by the Kala Academy Goa, he received a merit certificate for his portrayal of Ded Foot in the tiatr Zoitachi Ek Bhuk (A hunger for justice). Similarly, at the 37th Tiatr Competition (2011–2012), he was awarded a merit certificate for his comedic role as Poscoto in the tiatr Pojisanv (The Position). In addition, Fernandes received further recognition at the 38th Tiatr Competition (2012–2013) for his involvement in the tiatr Asson Nam (There was not). Here, he was presented with a merit certificate for his comedic portrayal of Marcus, as well as a merit certificate for his lyrics in his solo performance of "Padr Agnelo." Furthermore, at the 39th Tiatr Competition (2013–2014), he was honored with a merit certificate in the male category for his role as Jak Piedad in the tiatr Assumdhi (Forget It).

Continuing his success, Fernandes was recognized with a merit certificate in the male category for his performance as Marcus in the tiatr Tumi Kori Nakat (Y'all don't do it) at the 1st Tiatr B Group Competition 2014–2015. Additionally, he received another merit certificate in the male category for singing in the tiatr Inam (The Award) by Sunny De Cortalim at the 3rd Tiatr B Group Competition 2016–2017. Moreover, he received the Best Comedy Kantar award for his song "Bhattkaralem Cheddum" in the tiatr Girest Bhikari (The Rich Beggar) during the 6th Popular Tiatr Festival. Furthermore, Fernandes, together with Comedian Cedric, was honored with the Best Duo award for their song "Novech Kazari" in the album "Pai" at the Tiatr Academy of Goa's annual Konkani song and music awards.

== Select filmography ==
Year	Title	Role	Notes	Ref
2007	Good Bye	Writer/director		
2008	Thank You Brother	Writer/director	Credited as Comedian Marcos	
2009	Stop It	Writer/director		
2009	Adeus; Korchea Adim; Poieat Mhaka	Writer/director		
2009	Lakhpoti Zanvoi			
2013	Piso	Writer/director		
2016	Azun Kainch Choilonam			

== Selected stage works ==
Year	Title	Role	Notes	Ref
	Tem Tujem	Serious character	Debut as child artiste	
	Matiechem Aidonn		Professional debut	
	Nimanno Brestar			
	Koxtta Kantte			
	Tumkam Zai Toxem			
	Nimnno Poddo			
	Ghirest Bhikari			
	Tumi Konank Zai			
	Kalli Angostram	Writer		
	Tuka Lagon	Writer		
	Amkam Meulim	Writer		
	Atam Maka Disti Poddta			
	Fullam			
	Khotte Poixe			
	Mhaka Soeg Diat			
2003	Paanz			
2005	Zoitachi Ek Bhuk	Ded Foot		
2006	Tumchea Moga Pasot			
2008	He Goenche Put			
2008	Tin Vorsanni; Porot Iello; Pollounk Ieat	Director	Credited as Comedian Marcus de Cortalim	
2010	Pacharem			
2010	Chukleleank Bhogxitam			
2010	Hanv Patki Kiteak	Comedian		
2011	Pojisanv	Poscoto		
2012	Asson Nam	Marcus		
2012	Voir Marlolo Fator			
2013	Asumdhi	Jak Piedad		
2013	Match Fixing			
2014	Tumi Kori Nakat	Marcus	Also writer	
2015	Danv Re Ghoddea Danv	Panch		
2016	Inam	Singer		
2016	Maim Paichem Bessaum			
2016	Kallem Mazor			
2018	Happy Easter	Comedian/singer		
2019	Eke Sunecho Kaido			
