= Antonette de Calangute =

Indian theatre actress (1963–2014)

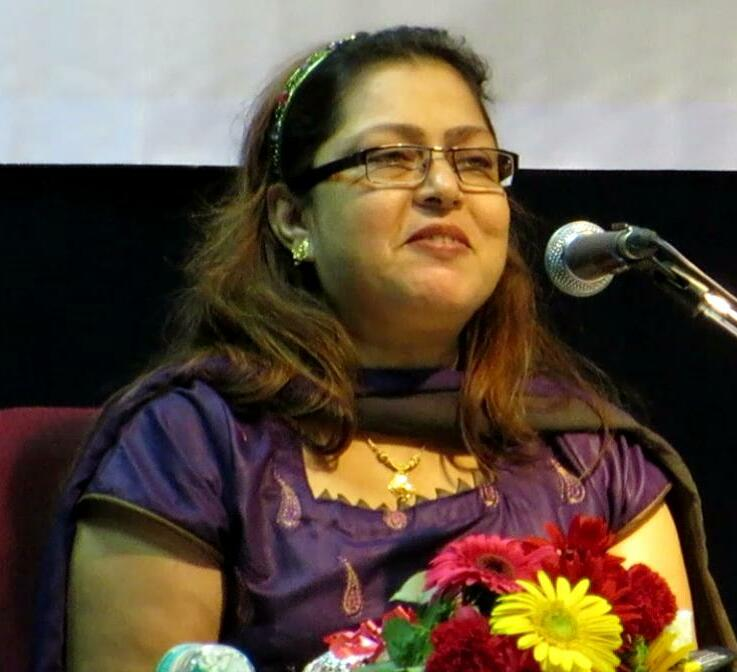
- Pereira at Ravindra Bhavan, Margao in 2012
- Born: Antonetta Souza; 6 March 1963; Calangute, Goa, India
- Died: 6 March 2014 (aged 51); Dona Paula, Goa, India
- Burial place: Our Lady of Merces Church cemetery, Colva, Goa, India
- Other name: Antoneta de Souza
- Occupations: Actress; singer
- Years active: 1979–2011
- Spouse: Bonny Pereira (m. 1984)
- Children: 2
- Relatives: Santiago Pereira (father-in-law)
- Awards: DKA's "Dalgado Cultural Award" (2012)

Antonette Pereira (born Antonetta Souza; 6 March 1963 – 6 March 2014), known professionally as Antonette de Calangute, was an Indian theatre actress, and singer who worked on the Konkani stage. A versatile performer, she is best known for her portrayal of tragic characters in tiatr productions.

== Early life ==
Antonette Pereira, originally named Antonetta Souza (later Antoneta de Souza), was born on 6 March 1963, in the town of Calangute. She is the daughter of Trindade Souza (later Trindade de Souza) and Matildes Lobo (later Maria Lobo). Pereira has a sister who resides in Mumbai.

== Career ==
In the theatrical season of 1978–79, Pereira marked her entry into the world of tiatr. Her debut performance took place in the production titled Sangati (Companion), written and directed by Vitorino Pereira, who would later become her brother-in-law. It was during the rehearsals and performances of this tiatr that Pereira fortuitously encountered Bonifacio "Bonny" Pereira, a fellow member of Vitorino's theatrical ensemble.

Vitorino, in need of two talented female artistes for his production, bestowed one of the roles upon Pereira. Hailing from the locale of Calangute, Pereira had already established herself as a seasoned stage performer, having previously showcased her acting prowess in shows curated by Danny de Ribandar. Bonded by their shared geographical roots, Bonny frequently accompanied Pereira to the rehearsals via public transportation. Together, they embarked on a journey, collaborating on the performance of Sangati. The depth of their connection steadily grew over the course of five years, culminating in the sacred union of marriage in 1984, as they solemnized their commitment to one another through the sacrament of Holy Matrimony.

Pereira highlighted the benefits of working as a couple, noting that it allows for joint travel and reduces reliance on others. This eliminates the need for the director to personally transport or arrange transportation for the couple, as they can handle their own logistics. Additionally, Pereira mentioned the emotional support that comes from sharing the highs and lows of their professional journey with a spouse who is also a member of the same troupe.

Konkani actress Ophelia expressed her admiration for Pereira's portrayal of a tragic role in the Konkani play Maim Tuzo Put Hanv (Mother, I'm your Son) during a performance in Mumbai. The compliment brought great joy to Pereira. Interestingly, Ophelia had previously confided in Joe Rose, the vice president of TAG (Tiatr Academy of Goa), stating that Pereira was the only artist among them who could perform tragic roles as effectively as she could. This statement was disclosed by Ophelia during a "Meet the Artiste" event.

Pereira achieved recognition for her performance as a centenarian in the tiatr production titled 100 Vorsam (100 Years), written by Menino de Bandar. Her portrayal of the elderly character garnered widespread acclaim, earning praise from audiences across various show venues. The scene in which Pereira conveyed the essence of a centenarian through her walk from the hall to the dining room elicited a resounding applause from spectators. Moreover, her poignant depiction of a mother at the mercy of her children in the tiatr Dha Lak (Ten Lakhs), also penned by Menino de Bandar, garnered immense appreciation from fans and resulted in her being honored at 25 different performance locations.

Pereira's artistic talents extended beyond the stage, as she lent her voice to numerous Konkani audio albums and made appearances in various VCD films. Collaborating with her husband Bonny, she produced their own audio album titled "Sukhnnim". As a professional artist, Pereira embarked on international assignments, showcasing her skills in regions such as the Middle East and Europe.

Her final appearance took place in Menino de Bandar's tiatr production Munis Kiteak Visorta?. Since joining Menino's troupe in 2005, Pereira contributed to approximately 12–16 productions. In addition to receiving accolades for her portrayal of an elderly woman in 100 Vorsam, Pereira's role as a mother in Dha Lakh, earned her 26 awards from appreciative audiences. Unfortunately, Pereira fell ill during rehearsals for the tiatr Kristanv (Christian) in 2012. Despite personally sewing her costumes, she was unable to participate in the final show.

== Personal life ==
On 15 December 1984, Pereira married Bonifacio Tertuliano Martinho "Bonny" Pereira, a Konkani actor and singer originating from Cotombi, Quepem. He was nine years senior to her. The wedding ceremony took place at the Church of Our Lady of Lourdes in Utorda, Goa. The couple went on to have two sons named Clifton and Collin.

=== 2012 health setback ===
In 2012, tragedy befell Pereira during a rehearsal for the tiatr production titled Kristav, where she was working with Menino de Bandar's troupe. Suddenly, Pereira fell seriously ill, and medical professionals determined that she was suffering from advanced renal failure, a condition that had irreversibly damaged both of her kidneys. As a result, Pereira's health rapidly deteriorated, leaving her frail and dependent on costly and continuous medical care. By October 2012, her only hope for survival rested on finding a suitable kidney donor for a transplant.

In a show of solidarity, the tiatr community, particularly the directors and playwrights with whom Pereira had collaborated for numerous years, joined forces to organize special performances of their respective tiatrs. The goal was twofold: to contribute financially towards Pereira's medical treatment and to foster optimism for her eventual recovery. Meanwhile, Pereira's fans fervently prayed for her well-being and eagerly awaited her triumphant return to the stage. Unfortunately, despite these concerted efforts, Pereira's search for a suitable kidney donor from a deceased individual, for which she had registered at a hospital in Hyderabad, proved to be an arduous and fruitless endeavor.

== Awards and nominations ==
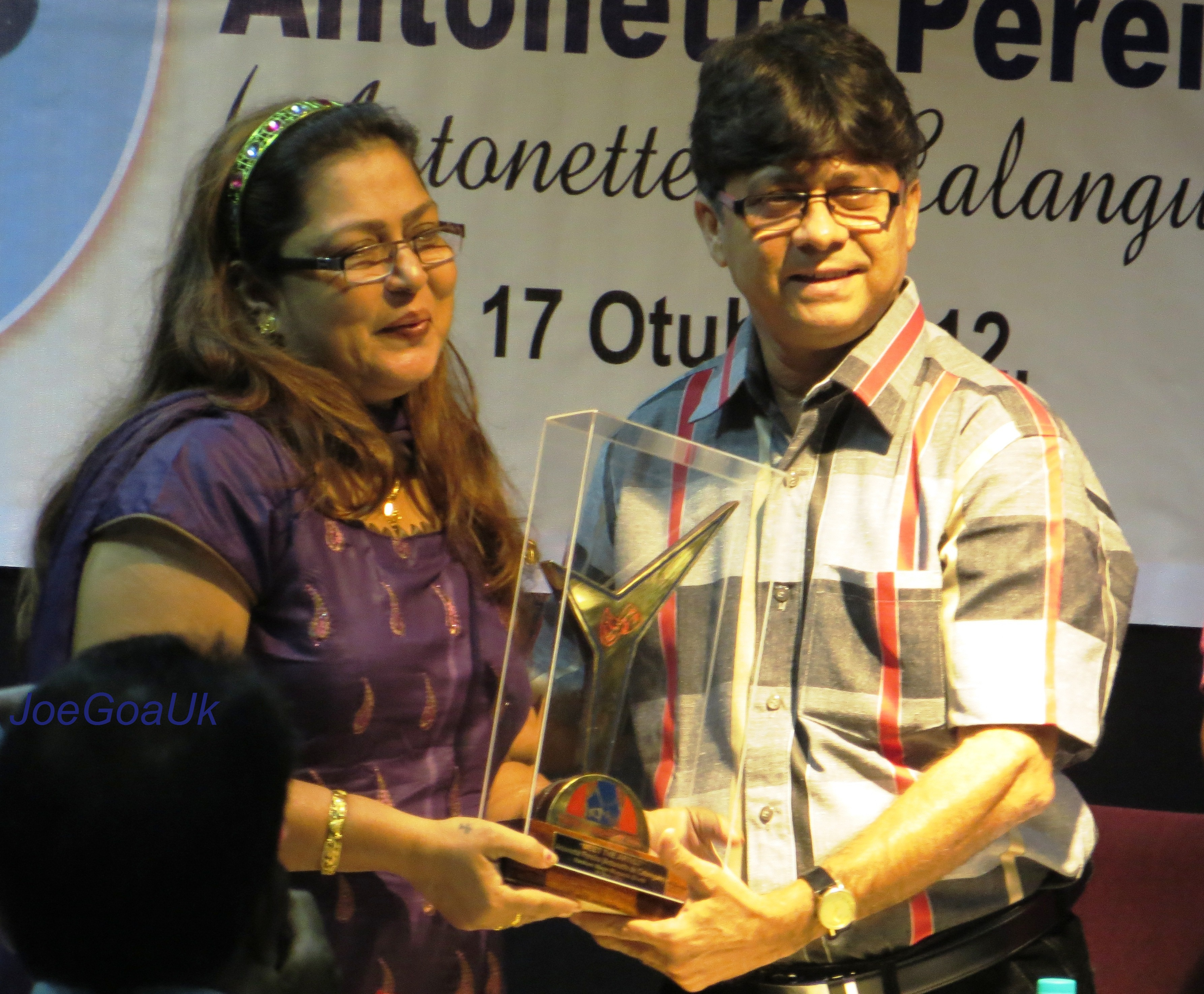
Pereira standing next to Prince Jacob at the 'Meet the Artiste' event, 2012

Pereira is a recipient of the Kala Academy award. Her contributions to Konkani culture were recognized with the Dalgado Cultural award in 2012, which honored her lifetime achievements. Pereira's performances in various tiatrs have earned her widespread praise and admiration. Her role in the tiatr 100 Vorsam garnered significant recognition, including a second prize in the acting category for female performers. Her portrayal in the tiatr Dha Lakh, directed by Menino de Bandar, was highly acclaimed.

In 2012, Pereira was felicitated for her significant contributions to Goan tiatr. She was also nominated for the 2003 Gulab Awards in the Best Actress category for her performance in the tiatr Maim Tuzo Put Hanv (Mother, I'm your Son).

== Death ==
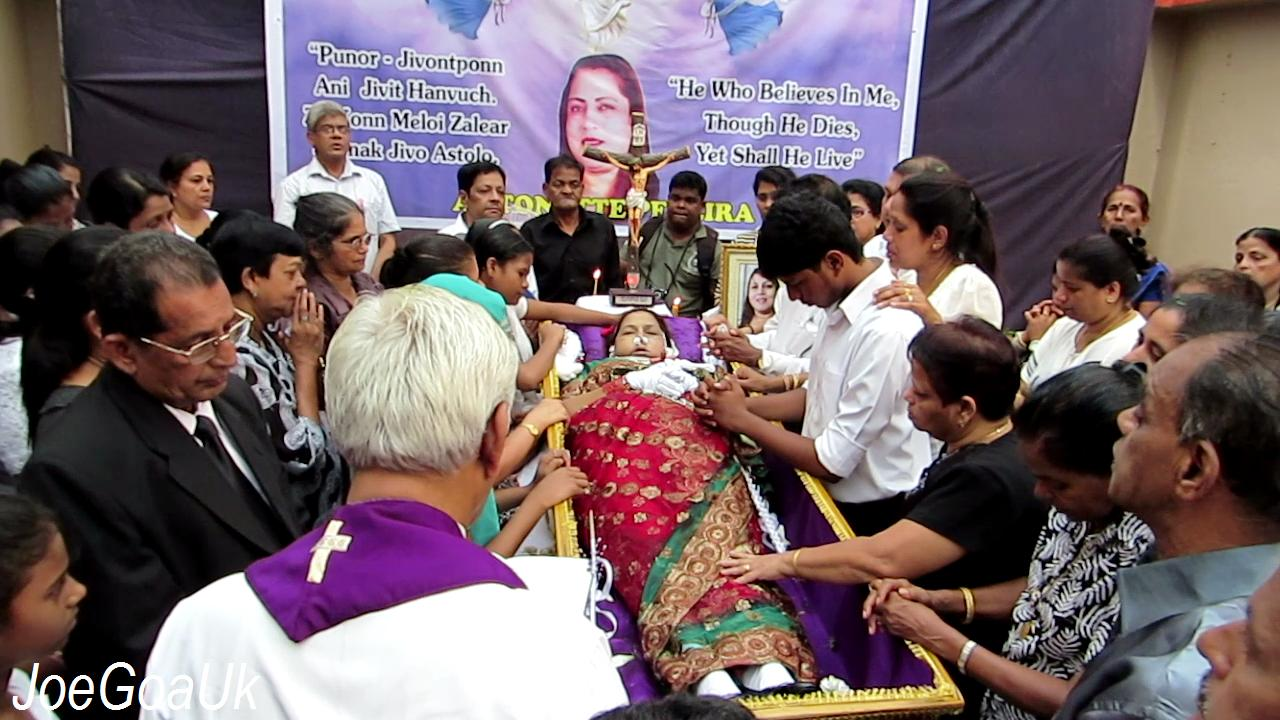
Photograph of Pereira's funeral at her residence in Colva, Goa, India.

On 4 March 2014, Pereira was admitted to Manipal Hospital in Dona Paula due to her deteriorating medical condition. The following day, she was transferred to the Intensive Care Unit (ICU). She died at approximately 2:40 am on her birthday. Her funeral ceremony took place on 9 March 2014, following a Eucharist celebration held at 3:30 pm at Our Lady of Merces Church in Colva.

=== Reactions ===
Prince Jacob, the president of the Tiatr Academy of Goa, acknowledged Pereira as a dedicated and prolific actor who selflessly served the Konkani stage. He noted the coincidence of her dying on her birthday and described her as a distinguished presence both on and off the stage, using the term sobit sundori (transl. fair beauty) to define her. Despite her illness, the tiatr community united to provide financial support for her treatment, but unfortunately, her destiny took a different course.

Jessie Dias, a veteran tragedienne from Anjuna, expressed deep sorrow over Pereira's untimely demise. She had shared the stage with Pereira in the tiatr Maim Dukhi, Sasumaim Sukhi by Star of Curtorim (Xeza Pai). Jessie reminisced about their time together during 1978–79 when Pereira frequently stayed at her residence after late-night performances. Jessie had visited Pereira a few days prior to her death and assured her of her support through prayers. She described Pereira as someone who bravely endured her illness.

Tomazinho Cardozo, the editor of Amcho Avaz and a director who cast Pereira in four of his plays, recognized her as a talented artist, particularly adept in tragic roles. He admired her ability to effortlessly portray challenging characters and praised her natural beauty as a valuable asset. He mourned the loss of such a young and gifted performer.

Daniel F de Souza, a renowned Konkani writer, shared his recollections of Pereira, describing her as a warm-hearted and affectionate individual. He highlighted her versatility as an artist and her ability to enhance the Konkani stage with her innate beauty. He emphasized her simplicity, which endeared her to others, and lamented the significant loss suffered by the Konkani stage due to her untimely demise. Pereira had been an integral part of Roseferns' troupe for 13 consecutive years, making her debut with his troupe in the tiatr Sot Tem Sot (Truth is Truth). De Souza remembered her as a talented artist who diligently fulfilled her responsibilities. Her illness caused her considerable suffering, and her death represents a profound loss to the Konkani stage.

Menino de Bandar, while extending his condolences, remarked that the Konkani stage had lost an exceptional actor. Pereira had performed in 16 tiatrs directed by him over the years.

== Selected stage works ==
Year	Title	Role	Notes	Ref
1978–1979	Sangati	Female artiste	Professional debut	
1991	Sot Tem Sot			
2003	Maim Tuzo Put Hanv	Tragic character		
2009	100 Vorsam	Centenarian		
2009	Maim Dukhi, Sasumaim Sukhi			
Dha Lakh	Mother			
2011	Munis Kiteak Visorta?		Final production	
2012	Kristanv		Not completed	

== Select discography ==
=== Albums ===
- Sukhnnim
