= Star of Curtorim =

Indian theatre director (1941–2013)

- Fernandes in an undated photo released by Tiatr Academy of Goa in 2012
- Born: Vicente Florenco Fernandes; 27 February 1941; Curtorim, Goa, Portuguese India, Portuguese Empire (now in India)
- Died: 16 May 2013 (aged 72); Curtorim, Goa, India
- Other names: Seza Pai; Vincent de Curtorim
- Occupations: Theatre director; dramatist; actor; composer
- Years active: 1959–2013

Vicente Florenco Fernandes (Note: Alternatively spelt as Vincent Florencio Fernandes.) (27 February 1941 – 16 May 2013), known professionally as Star of Curtorim or Seza Pai, was an Indian theatre director, dramatist, actor and composer, who primarily worked on the Konkani stage. He is best known for his tiatr Seza Pai (1976) which he staged along with Nelson Afonso during the golden phase. (Note: Fernandes was part of the second golden phase of tiatr, which lasted from 1961 to the 1970s.)

== Early life ==
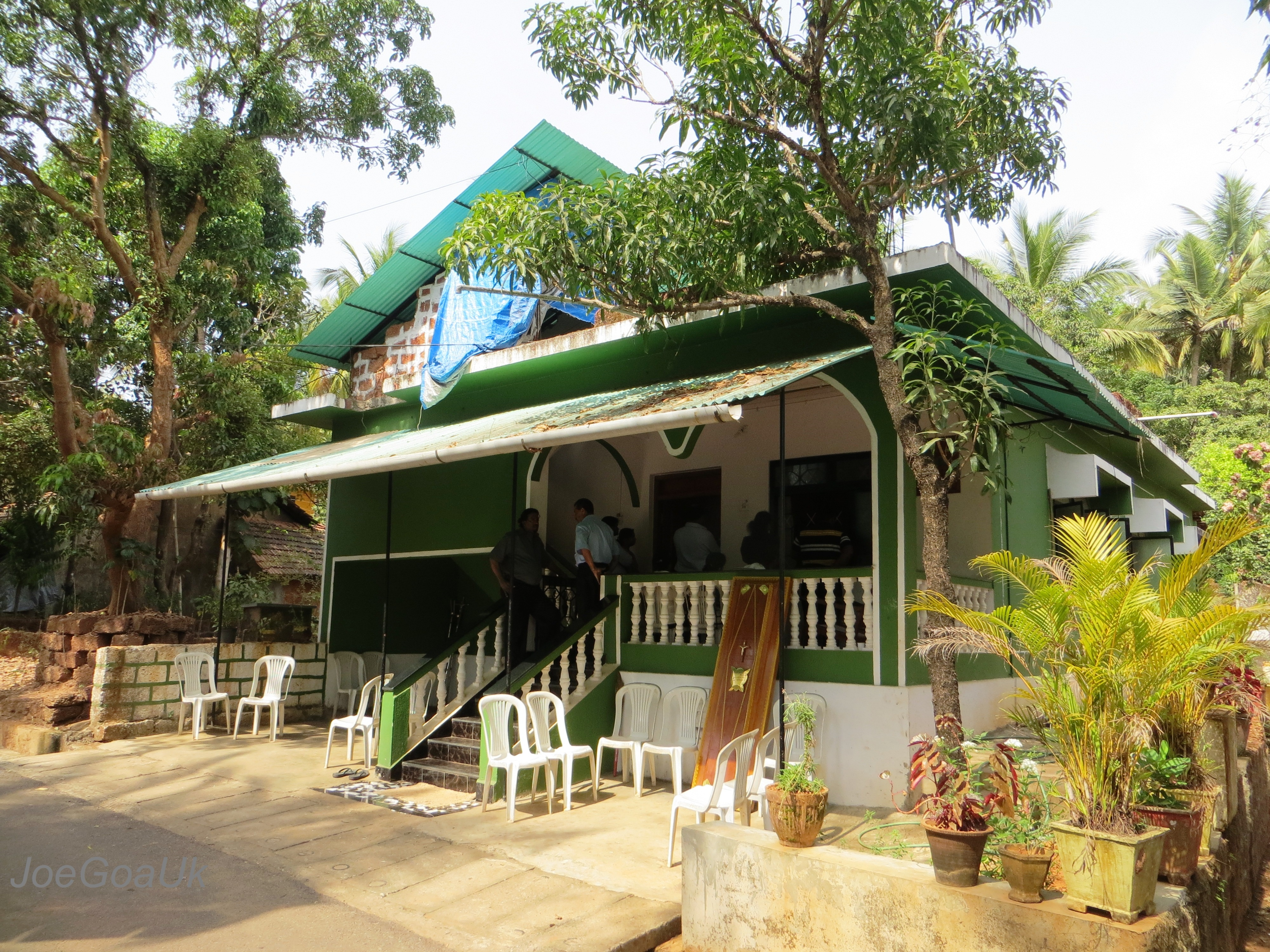
Fernandes' residence at Curtorim.

Vicente Florenco Fernandes was born on 27 February 1941 in Curtorim, Goa, Portuguese India during the Portuguese Empire (now in India) to Joaquim Joao Fernandes and Maria Augusta Mascarenhas. He hailed from a destitute family and found himself sent to labor at the residence of a bhatkar (landlord) during the Portuguese era. This practice was widespread during that time period, however, Fernandes had the misfortune of serving a particularly harsh bhatkar.

One fateful day, Fernandes was coerced into sleeping in the cowshed alongside the cattle, an experience that instilled fear within him. Despite his trepidation, Fernandes mustered the bravery to escape from this oppressive environment under the cover of darkness.

== Career ==
=== Early years ===
Fernandes, like many individuals from Goa, migrated to Bombay (now Mumbai) in search of employment opportunities. However, as he was settling into his new life, the diplomatic relations between the Portuguese government, which held control over Goa at the time, and the Indian government began to deteriorate. This led to concerns among the Goan community residing in Bombay that sea and road routes could potentially be blocked. In response to the growing unease, Fernandes decided to return to Goa.

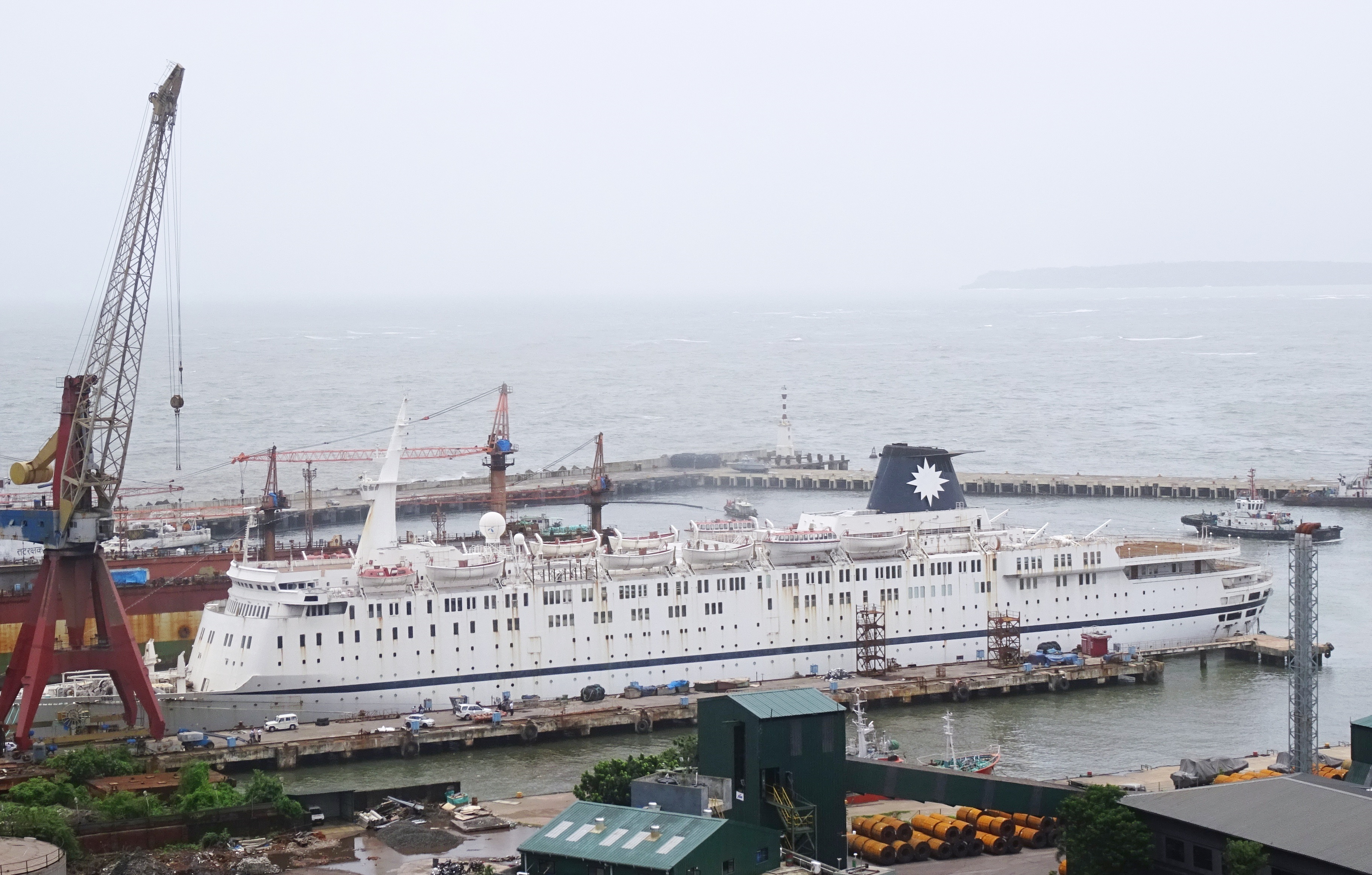
Top view of Goa Shipyard (2016)

Back in Goa, Fernandes received assistance in securing a job from a Portuguese family, whose patriarch served as the director of "Estaleiros Navais de Goa", now known as Goa Shipyard. Recognizing Fernandes' dedication and sincerity in his work, the Portuguese officer arranged for employment for Fernandes at the Goa Shipyard, where he remained employed until his retirement.

=== Konkani stage (1959–2013) ===
In the realm of Konkani theater, Fernandes played a pivotal role in safeguarding and popularizing tiatr during his career spanning over five decades. He demonstrated his versatility as a writer, director, and producer of numerous highly acclaimed tiatrs, such as "Izmol", "Maim Dukhi Sasumaim Sukhi", "Put Mhozo Bekar", "Nirmilolem Jivit", and "Seza Pai". Fernandes was regarded as a gentleman, always acknowledging the invaluable assistance provided by tiatr artists. He consistently held Nelson Afonso, a renowned tiatr artist from an earlier era, in high esteem for his support in staging "Seza Pai".

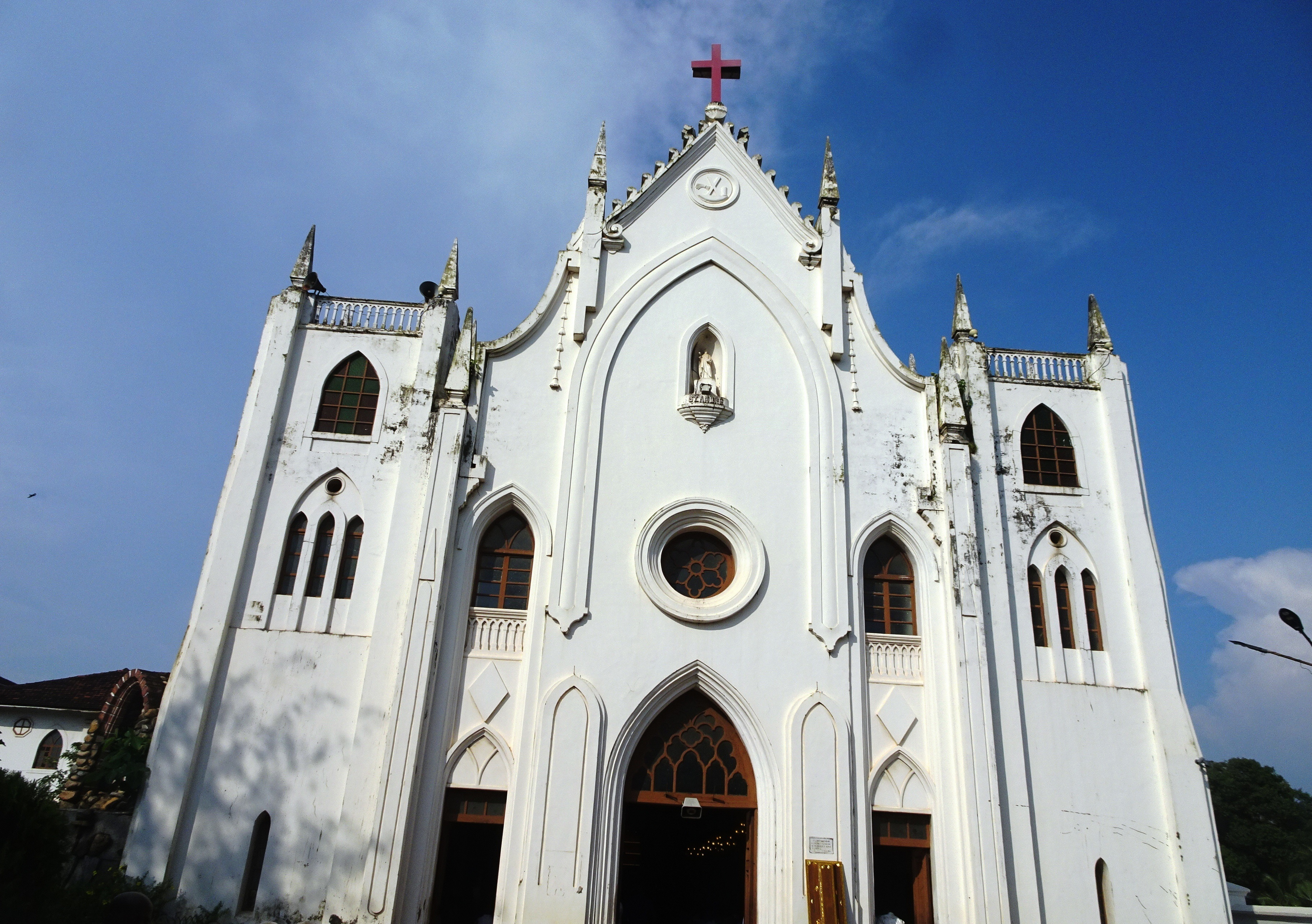
St. Andrew's Church, Vasco (2018)

"Seza Pai" was a tiatr production inspired by a true story set in Goa. The story revolves around a beggar who regularly sought alms in front of St. Andrew's Church in Vasco. This beggar demonstrated compassion by using the money he collected to purchase fruits and chocolates, which he then distributed among the children attending catechism classes at the church. Intrigued by his actions, Fernandes would frequently observe him from the roadside. Moved by the beggar's selflessness, he drew inspiration from this incident and crafted a theatrical production titled "Seza Pai". With the assistance of Afonso, Fernandes organized performances of the tiatr across the state of Goa. As a result, he himself became affectionately known as Seza Pai.

Fernandes exhibited great enthusiasm for Konkani tiatr and music, showcasing his passion through his debut tiatr "Put Mhozo Bekar" in 1959. Encouraged by the positive reception, he continued his creative journey with "Nirmilolem Jivit," earning accolades from Afonso. This commendation prompted Fernandes to approach Afonso for assistance in producing his successful tiatr "Seza Pai."

Afonso not only provided guidance but also actively participated as an actor in the tiatr, fostering a sense of deep gratitude within Fernandes. Renowned for his skill as a composer, Fernandes excelled in crafting "cantos" for the tiatr. Despite his talent, he remained modest and sought feedback from playwright Patrick Dourado, who served as a guiding influence whenever necessary.

== Awards ==
Fernandes' achievements on the tiatr stage garnered widespread recognition from various institutions and the Government of Goa. His contributions were honored by organizations such as the Curtorim Jaycees Club in 2010 and the Kala Academy in 2008. In further acknowledgment of his talent and impact, the government bestowed upon him the Goa State Cultural Award in 2009.

== Select stage works ==
Year	Title	Role	Notes	Ref
1959	Put Mhozo Bekar	Writer/director	Debur Tiatr	
	Nirmilolem Jivit	Writer/director		
1976	Seza Pai	Writer/director		
	Katteantlem Ful	Writer		
	Orkache Panch Mister	Actor		
	St. Francis Xavier	Actor		
	Saat Dukhi	Actor		
	Jevnnachi Buti	Writer/director		
	Padri	Writer/director		
	Mhozo Sonvsar	Writer/director		
	Izmol	Writer/director		
2009	Maim Dukhi Sasumaim Sukhi	Writer/director		
2013	Bail Dukhi Kumar Sukhi	Writer/director	Not completed	

== Death ==
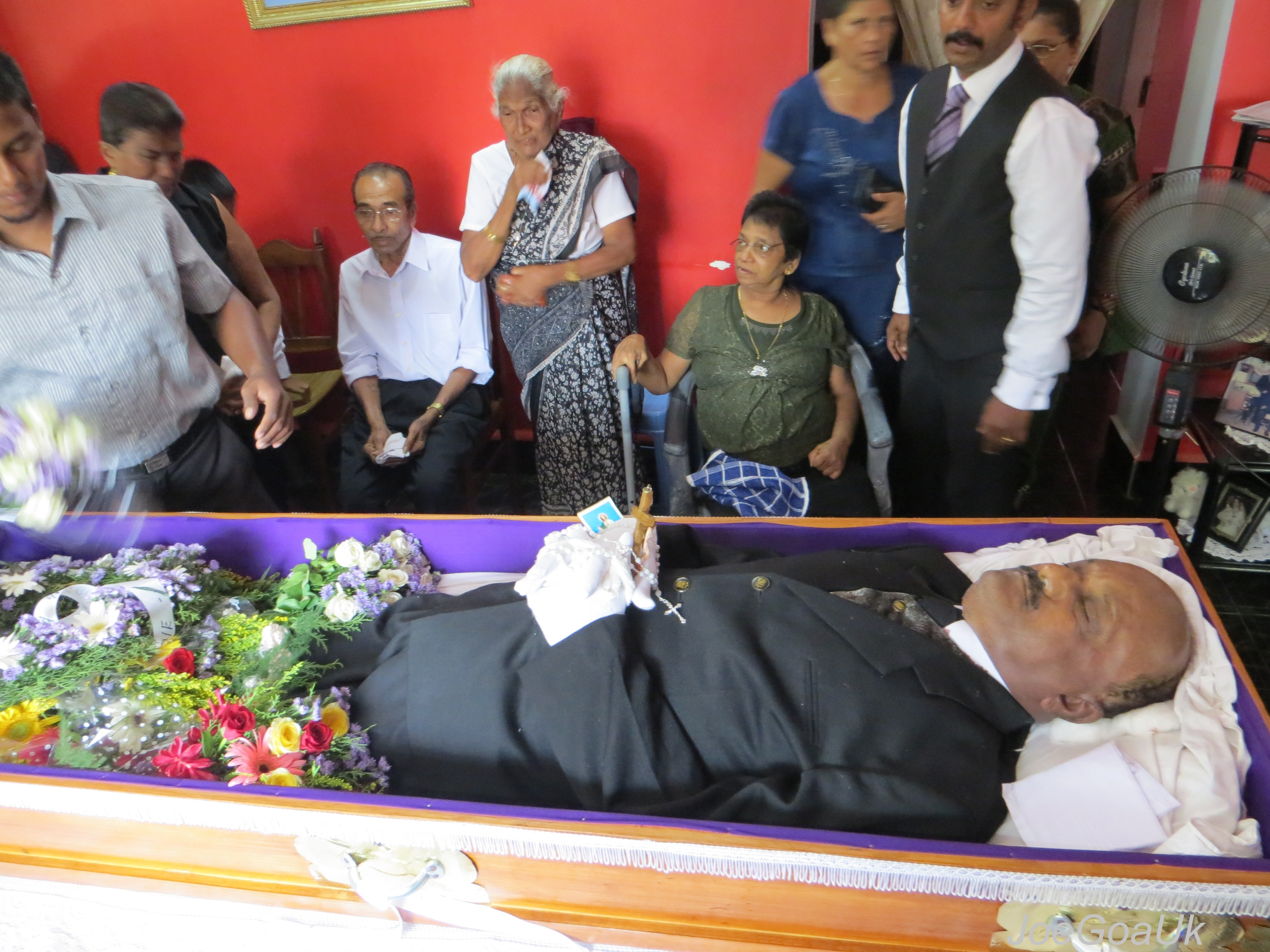
A photograph of Fernandes taken during the funeral service, capturing him alongside his grieving family.

On 16 May 2013, Fernandes died tragically at his residence in Curtorim, Goa, aged 72. The Roman Konkani version of O Heraldo, known as Amcho Avaz, extended their condolences to Fernandes' family. The Tiatr Academy of Goa also expressed deep sadness upon Fernandes' demise, recognizing him as one of the esteemed theater directors in Konkani language. They acknowledged the significant loss experienced by the Konkani stage.
