= Shrirang Narvekar =

Indian politician and actor (1938–2013)

President of United Goans Democratic Party
- In office 1990s–2007

Personal details
- Born: Shrirang Pandurang Narvekar; 12 January 1938
- Died: 12 March 2013 (aged 75)
- Occupation: Politician; actor

Shrirang Pandurang Narvekar (12 January 1938 – 12 March 2013) was an Indian politician, actor, and pandal decorator who served as the president of the United Goans Democratic Party (UGDP), a political party recognised in the coastal state of Goa. He resigned from the position in 2007. Apart from his political career, he was known for his work in Konkani films and tiatr productions.
