= Carmo Rod =

Indian singer and director (1939–1975)

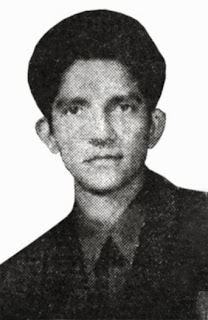
- Portrait of Rodrigues during his youth
- Born: Carmo Piedade Rodrigues; 16 July 1939; Assolna, Goa, Portuguese India
- Died: 13 August 1975 (aged 36); Bombay, Maharashtra, India
- Occupations: Singer; playwright; theatre director
- Years active: 1960s–1970s
- Notable work: Nirmon (1966)

Carmo Piedade Rodrigues (16 July 1939 – 13 August 1975), known professionally as Carmo Rod, was an Indian singer, playwright, and theatre director known for his work in Konkani films and tiatr productions.

== Early life ==
Carmo Piedade Rodrigues was born on 16 July 1939 in Assolna, Goa, which was part of Portuguese India during the Portuguese Empire. He was born to Caetano Jose Rodrigues and the homemaker Maria Avelina Cardoso, who hailed from Cuncolim into a Goan Catholic family.

== Career ==
Rodrigues achieved fame for his composition "Nach Atanche" in the Konkani film Nirmon, where it was picturised on the Konkani actor A. R. Souza Ferrao. The song encountered challenges regarding suitable performers, but Rodrigues showcased his talent, earning him the opportunity to deliver a standout performance in the film. Wilson Mazarello, in his observations, characterizes Rodrigues as a singer with a distinctive style, known for his involvement as a crooner in the band AVC Pops alongside fellow band member Johnny Boy in 1970. Singing came naturally to Rodrigues, and his contributions to tiatrs, the Goan musical theater tradition, garnered significant applause. He lent his voice to productions by tiatrists such as C. Alvares, M. Boyer, Jacint Vaz, Alfred Rose, and Robin Vaz, among others. Rodrigues is particularly known for his popular solo track "Don Panam," which resonated with the sentiments of preserving Goan identity during the 1967 Opinion Poll. This song captured the outcome of the poll and evoked a sense of pride and preservation among Goans. His last documented appearance was in Jephsis Hitler's tiatr Bhau ani Zhau before his departure for Kuwait.

According to The Navhind Times, Rodrigues possessed a captivating voice and exhibited the ability to sing in both Konkani and English. His vocals led to numerous requests for him to perform the number "Nach Atanche." Alongside fellow tiatrists M. Boyer, Kid Boxer, M. Dod de Verna, and the Trio Kings Conception-Nelson-Anthony, Rodrigues actively contributed to strengthening the effort to oppose mergers during the 1967 Opinion Poll. Furthermore, he upheld a strong connection with John Claro, participating in his tiatrs alongside A.M.B. Rose and Domnick Vaz. In addition to his singing prowess, Rodrigues ventured into writing and directing, creating a tiatr titled Girestkayek Lobdon. He also lent his vocal talents to the Konkani film Yam-Bam-Boh. Throughout his career, Rodrigues composed approximately five tiatrs.

== Death ==
A few years after moving to Kuwait, Rodrigues died on 13 August 1975 at a hospital in Bombay, Maharashtra. In line with his final request, he was laid to rest in Goa, India.

== Filmography ==
Year	Title	Role	Notes	Ref
1966	Nirmon	Singer	Debut film	
	Yam-Bam-Boh	Singer		

== Selected stage works ==
Year	Title	Role	Notes	Ref
	Girestkayek Lobdon	Writer/director		
	Bhau ani Zhau		Final production	

== Select discography ==
- Nach Atanche (1966)
- Don Panam (1967)
