= M. Dod de Verna =

Indian singer and composer (1933–1970)

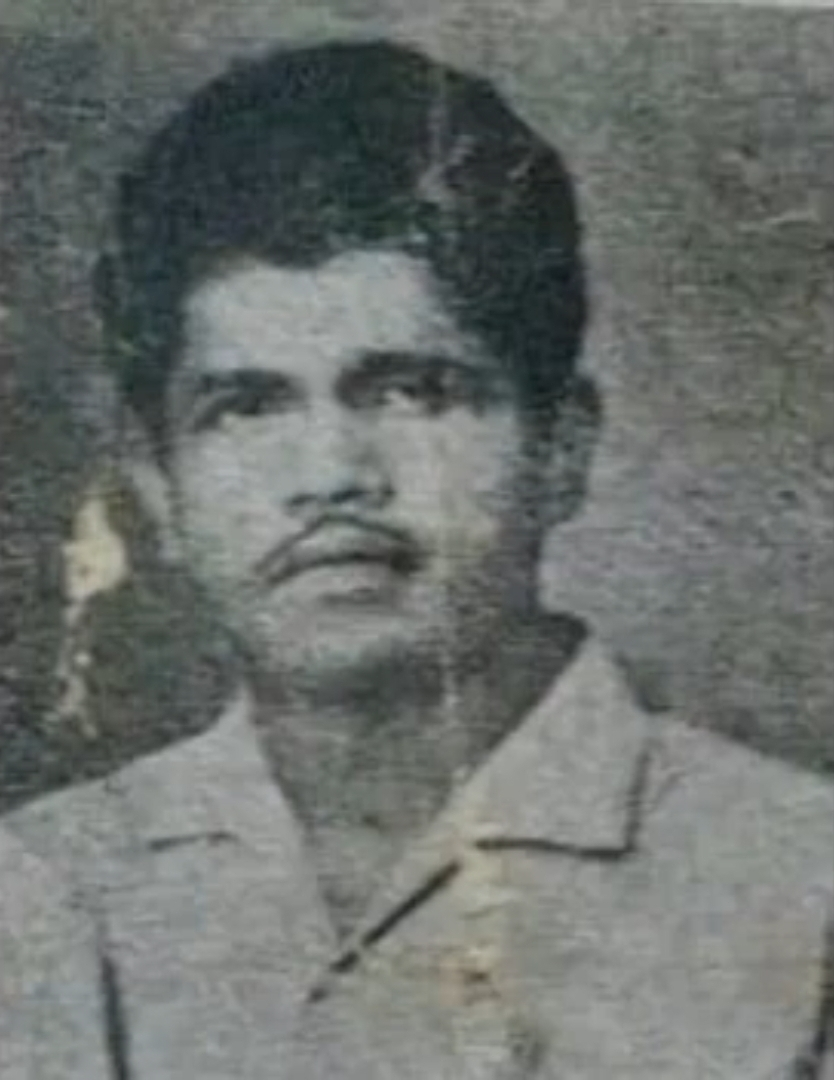
- Portrait of Dourado during his youth
- Born: Miguel Santana Dourado; 2 November 1933; Verna, Goa, Portuguese India, Portuguese Empire
- Died: 8 March 1970 (aged 36); Goa, India
- Occupations: Singer; composer; playwright; director
- Years active: c. 1951–1970
- Spouse: Ana Vales (m. 1959)
- Children: 4

Miguel Santana Dourado (2 November 1933 – 8 March 1970), known professionally as M. Dod de Verna, was an Indian singer, composer, playwright, theatre director, and actor who worked on the Konkani stage.

== Early life ==
Miguel Santana Dourado was born on 2 November 1933 in Verna, Goa which was part of Portuguese India during the Portuguese Empire to Domingos Dourado, and Ana Maria Fernandes, a homemaker into a Goan Catholic family. He had an elder sister, Filomena (b. 1931). He hailed from Mazilvaddo, Verna, Goa. Dourado exhibited a talent for singing from an early age and drew inspiration from tiatrists such as A. R. Souza Ferrão and Minguel Rod. During his childhood, he actively participated in local village concerts. However, he initially relied on borrowing songs from friends and well-wishers due to his limited knowledge of music composition. His involvement in the performing arts also extended to acting, albeit in minor roles within his village community. As he matured and gained experience on stage, Dourado gradually honed his skills and began composing his own songs.

== Career ==
During his formative years, Dourado embarked on his creative journey by crafting his inaugural tiatr production, Konnanchi Girestkai? (Whose Wealth?) at the age of 18. The staging of this tiatr in his native village of Verna marked a milestone in Dourado's career. Although he had initially pursued tailoring as a vocation, his passion for tiatr propelled him forward. Recognizing the pivotal role of Bombay as the epicenter of tiatr, Dourado ventured to the city with aspirations of establishing himself as a tiatrist. However, he encountered formidable challenges in this pursuit. The tiatr landscape in Bombay was firmly dominated by a select group of tiatrists, and acceptance as a newcomer, whether as an actor or singer, was an arduous task. To overcome these obstacles, Dourado commenced his journey from the grassroots level, actively participating in singing competitions organized by various associations. He consistently emerged victorious in these competitions. A particularly event took place when Dourado's abilities caught the attention of A. R. Souza Ferrão, who witnessed his triumph in a competition. Impressed by Dourado's prowess, Ferrão extended an opportunity to him to showcase his vocal abilities in the commercially produced tiatr Camil Bottler, written by John Claro.

Dourado's debut performance in Camil Bottler took place on 25 December 1953, at the Princess Theatre Bhangwadi in Bombay. The success of this performance served as a catalyst for his career, garnering acclaim and igniting interest from other directors. Although initially reliant on borrowing compositions from other artists, Dourado gradually honed his skills as a composer, eventually mastering the art of crafting his own music. Dourado became one of the leading tiatrists of his era. Dourado's acting career began with modest roles, showcasing his abilities and establishing him as a performer. He quickly gained recognition by appearing in tiatrs alongside veterans such as C. Alvares, A. R. Souza Ferrão, Anthony De Sa, Anthony Mendes, Andrew Ferns, Master Vaz, Remmie Colaço, and others. During his time in Bombay, he ventured into playwriting, creating two of his own tiatrs and staging them. Unfortunately, these productions did not achieve success, prompting him to reassess his prospects in Bombay. Consequently, he made the decision to return to his hometown of Goa, where his previous accomplishments in Bombay had already garnered him a level of fame. As a result, he found it considerably easier to secure roles in tiatrs in Goa. Furthermore, Dourado's singing abilities began to captivate audiences in Goa, contributing to his growing popularity. On occasion, he collaborated with Master Vaz and Young Menezes to form vocal trios.

Dourado later joined the Stars of Goa Stage group, which occupied a prominent position in the Goan drama scene at that time. His colleagues in the group included Nelson Afonso, Young Menezes, Tony Sax, Luis Rod, Aristides Dias, A. S. Conception, Champion Peter, Peter Gomes, and Jacinto Vaz. However, the group encountered its fair share of challenges, leading to its dissolution. Dourado promptly became a member of a newly formed ensemble known as the Young Stars of Goa. This group, comprising individuals such as Nelson Afonso, Young Menezes, Tony Sax, Champion Peter, Jacinto Vaz, A. S. Conception, Aristides Dias, and others, exerted a dominant presence on the Goan tiatr stage. Dourado's involvement with this group persisted, and he frequently performed the opening songs in their tiatrs. He also engaged in duets with Aristides Dias or Sabina Fernandes, as well as collaborating with Platilda Dias, Philomena Braz, and Nelson Afonso. Dourado initially embarked on his career as a singer on the tiatr stage, however, his artistic prowess extended beyond his vocal abilities, as he soon ventured into enacting cameo roles. Dourado's association with All India Radio, Panaji, provided him with a platform to record several songs, which continue to be periodically broadcast. As his career progressed, Dourado's creative talent flourished, particularly in the realm of playwriting. He authored and staged a body of tiatrs. Dourado became a regular director for the Young Stars of Goa group.

Dourado wrote and directed approximately 15 tiatrs. Among his popular works are the tiatrs, Bognar, Honrad Tarvotti, Motlobi Podonn, Kallzacho Aunddo, No Vacancy, Obrigassum vou Devosaum, Soirikar Salu, Moriad, Sothechem Ghor, Goenchi Mati, Rinnkari, Gottalo, and Thevoi Thomas. Dourado's influence extended beyond his creative endeavors. He played a pivotal role in nurturing and encouraging emerging talents within the tiatr community. He dedicated his efforts to training village boys in the art of khell performances, a traditional Goan folk theatre form. Dourado's khells, written achieved success. In addition to his accomplishments as a playwright and director, Dourado composed and performed a repertoire of songs. His compositions, such as "Handbilam Maddoitat, Joker Zauncho Poddlo," "Karddam," "Göychi Fenni," "Bodol'lam Chart," "Göychem Eleisanv," "Noko Aslolo Monis," "Devacho Upordes," "Devacho Gutt," and "Birankull Horam," resonated with audiences. Dourado's artistic endeavors conveyed meaningful messages, tackling a diverse array of social, cultural, and moral themes. His tiatrs in this regard include Konnachi Girestkai?, Honrad Tarvotti, Motlobi Podonn, Kallzacho Aunddo, Göychi Mati, and Thevoi Thomas. Throughout his career, Dourado collaborated with popular directors of his time. Each new tiatr production provided an opportunity for him to introduce fresh talent to the stage. Additionally, he participated in over 100 tiatr performances, both in his own productions and those of others.

== Personal life ==
On 3 February 1959, Dourado married Ana Maria Vales, a homemaker originally from Nuvem at Capela de Nagoà (now The Our Lady of Succour and Good Success Church, Nagoa). The couple had four children: Maria (b. 1961), Manuel (b. 1962), Filomena (b. 1959), and Fabiana (b. 1966).

== Selected stage works ==
Year	Title	Role	Notes	Ref
c. 1951	Konnanchi Girestkai?	Writer	Professional debut	
1953	Camil Bottler	Singer		
	Bognar	Writer/director		
	Honrad Tarvotti	Writer/director		
	Motlobi Podonn	Writer/director		
	Kallzacho Aunddo	Writer/director		
	No Vacancy	Writer/director		
	Obrigassum vou Devosaum	Writer/director		
	Soirikar Salu	Writer/director		
	Moriad	Writer/director		
	Sothechem Ghor	Writer/director		
	Rinnkari	Writer/director		
	Gottalo	Writer		
1965	Thevoi Thomas	Writer/director	Also unnamed role	
1960s	Goenchi Mati	Writer/director		
1970	Sam Francis Xavier	Unnamed role		
	Kantteantlem Ful	Unnamed role	Unfinished tiatr	
1970s	Sot'techem Ghor	Co-writer	Posthumous release	

== Death ==
On 8 March 1970, Dourado died at the age of 36 in Goa. His final appearance on stage was documented in February 1970, with his performance in J. P. Souzalin's tiatr production titled Sam Francis Xavier (Saint Francis Xavier). Coincidentally, during this period, plans were underway to release a new tiatr production called Kantteantlem Ful by Star of Curtorim, featuring Dourado's image on the promotional handbill. However, Dourado's demise came unexpectedly, leaving his creative endeavors unfinished. The half-written script for his latest tiatr, Sot'techem Ghor, remained incomplete. In a tribute to their departed friend and colleague, Nelson Afonso, a trusted companion of Dourado, took it upon himself to honor his memory by completing the script and staging the tiatr posthumously.
