= Jephsis Hitler =

Indian comedian and actor (1925–1997)

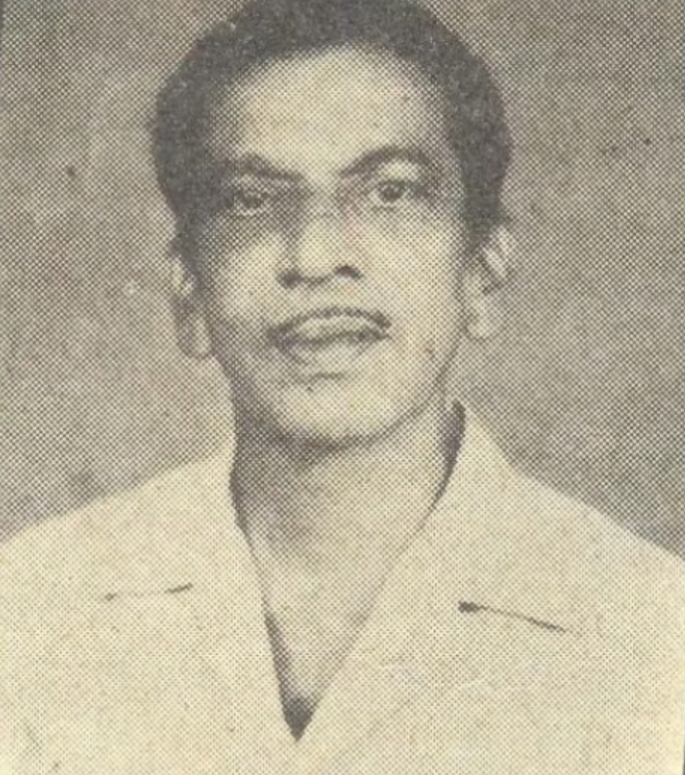
- Portrait of Leitaõ during his youth
- Born: José Francisco Leitaõ; 5 June 1925; Chinchinim, Goa, Portuguese India, Portuguese Empire
- Died: 31 March 1997 (aged 71); Chinchinim, Goa, India
- Occupations: Comedian; theatre actor; singer; composer; playwright
- Years active: c. 1937–1980s
- Known for: Playing roles of Kunbi characters in tiatrs
- Spouse: Esperança Fernandes (m. 1949)
- Children: 5

José Francisco Leitaõ (5 June 1925 – 31 March 1997), known professionally as Jephsis Hitler, was an Indian comedian, theatre actor, singer, composer, and playwright who worked on the Konkani stage.

== Early life ==
José Francisco Leitaõ was born on 5 June 1925 in the locality of Tolleaband in Chinchinim, Goa, which was part of Portuguese India during the Portuguese Empire. He was born to day laborers Inacinho and Piedade Leitaō into a Goan Catholic family. Leitaõ showed early signs of being an entertainer when he started organizing fells (Goan street plays) and concerts in Chinchinnim, his village, at the age of 12. Leitaõ established impromptu stages on his neighbors' verandas, utilizing bedsheets as makeshift curtains. His performances swiftly garnered acclaim among the local villagers. Leitaō's reputation as an entertaining performer eventually reached the ears of the Goan writer and director, mestri Antonio Moraes, who was known for his work with fells and khell-tiatrs (non-stop tiatrs). Moraes recruited Leitaõ to act as a comedian in his fells, and Leitaō's comedic talents were well received by the fell audiences. This led to Leitaō becoming a sought-after performer in the local Goan theater scene during that time period.

From a young age, Leitaō demonstrated a strong inclination towards the performing arts, particularly singing and acting. He actively participated in cultural programs organized within his school and local community, often captivating audiences with his acting abilities. After gaining experience in comedic performances through his involvement with popular fell mestris (street plays teachers), Leitaõ decided to form his own fell troupe. This allowed him to showcase his acting talents by performing fells (also a type of Goan folk theater) annually during the Carnival and Easter seasons. Leitao's exposure to the commercial tiatr (Konkani theater) productions, which he regularly attended with his maternal uncle, further fueled his interest in the art form. Inspired by what he witnessed, Leitaō began staging his own tiatrs, starting in his hometown of Chinchinim and gradually expanding to the surrounding villages. This marked the beginning of Leitao's foray into the tiatr theater tradition, which would become a significant aspect of his artistic pursuits.

== Career ==
Leitaō was a popular figure in the Goan theater tradition known as tiatr during the mid-20th century. He began his stage career performing in local village concerts, where he demonstrated talent as both a singer and comedic actor. One of Leitaō's strengths was his ability to portray Kunbi characters. "He had a natural knack for capturing the distinct Kunbi accent, and when dressed in traditional Kunbi attire, his characterizations were considered flawless," writes historian Wilson Mazarello. Leitaō's expanding renown in the local Chinchinim community led to invitations to showcase his talents in tiatrs, traditional Goan plays, throughout the wider Salcete region of Goa. Leading tiatr directors of the time, including Edward Almeida, Minguel Rod, Jacinto Vaz, Saluzinho, Kamat de Assolna, Dioguinho D'Mello, Aleixinho de Candolim, and C. Alvares, sought to feature Leitaõ in their productions.

Due to Leitaō's small stature, humorous character, and skills in singing and acting, he swiftly endeared himself to audiences who frequented tiatrs, especially in the Salcete region. His performances often drew sold-out crowds. In addition to his skills as a performer, Leitaō was known for his proficiency in composing musical arrangements, with a focus on creating pieces for duets, trios, and quartets. As a new generation of tiatr directors emerged, Leitaō continued collaborating with talents such as Nelson Afonso, A. S. Conception, Kamat de Assolna, and Aristides Dias. Leitaō also authored several tiatrs himself, including works titled Xeutteamchi Ganthon, Belgaumkar, Mogachi Justis, Chouto Upordes, Kunnbi Niklau, Bhau ani Zau, and Bakro Amge Zalem.

Leitaõ authored and staged several tiatr productions over the course of his career. His first tiatr work, titled Xeutteamchi Ganthon, critiqued the corrupt legal system of the time, in which lawyers were allegedly susceptible to bribery in exchange for a ganthon (braid) of mullets. Following this early commentary, Leitaõ went on to write and perform in a variety of other tiatrs, often collaborating with well-established commercial tiatrists. Some of his popular works included Bhavart (Faith), Belgaumkar (Belgaum-based), Onupkari Put (Ungrateful Son), Chouto Upordhes, Mogachi Justis (Loving Justis), Kunnbi Niklau (Kunbi Niklau), Bacro Amje Zalem, Bhau Ani Zau, and Bhognnar Putache, among others. In addition to his writing and directing, Leitaō was also an actor and singer, and he participated in tiatrs produced by other artists. Minguel Rod recognized the acting and singing abilities of Leitaõ, prompting an invitation to join a theatrical production called Intruz Vo Carnaval in Bombay. His performance in Rod's Intruz Vo Carnaval helped establish Leitaõ as a leading Goan comedian.

Leitaõ captivated and enthralled tiatr audiences with his comedic prowess, eliciting laughter and earning acclaim for his performances. His popularity soared as he became an entertainer among theatergoers. Leitaō's comedic abilities were further showcased in his acclaimed portrayals in John Claro's Gupit Karann (Secret Reason), which received praise in both Goa and Bombay. Other tiatr directors, such as M. Boyer and Roam Tony, also featured Leitaō in their productions, including Atam Konn Ghatki? (Now, who is the traitor?), staged in Bombay, and Deodita (God-given). Leitao's humor and comedic skills caught the attention of Jacinto Vaz, who cast him in the production Kunhad Ani Mana performed in Africa in 1957. Leitao further showcased his talent by presenting his famous theatrical production Kunnbi Niclau at the audience's behest, solidifying his reputation as a versatile and crowd-pleasing performer. Throughout his career, Leitaō was known for his comedic flair, which delighted tiatr-going audiences in Goa and beyond.

Leitaõ was known for his versatile vocal abilities, delivering a wide range of songs as a soloist and in ensemble pieces such as duets, trios, and quartets. His duet performances as a Kunbi character alongside Anita de Goa were favored by the audience, showcasing their popularity and appeal in the entertainment realm. Despite his diminutive stature, Leitaō commanded a strong presence on the Konkani stage. He collaborated with several popular actors and playwrights over the course of his career, including Luciano Dias, who later achieved fame in his own right within the Konkani theater community. Leitaō was primarily celebrated for his comedic abilities. His distinctive physicality, including his gait and body language, as well as his wordplay, regularly elicited laughter from tiatr audiences. Because of his diminutive stature, he excelled in comedic roles. The future Konkani playwright and politician Tomazinho Cardozo attended Leitaō's performances in his youth. In addition to his solo comedic work, Leitaō also participated in comic duet routines during tiatr productions. In one particular tiatr directed by Aristides Dias, he appeared alongside another comedian, Luis Rod, who portrayed a female character. Leitaő's small stature contrasted humorously with Rod's taller, more feminine appearance, further entertaining the viewers.

Leitaō and Luis Rod were a popular Goan comedy duo known for their performances in tiatrs (Konkani plays). Their significant height difference was a key part of their act, often eliciting laughter from audiences. In one noted instance, the taller Luis Rod, who frequently portrayed female characters, easily lifted and carried the smaller Leitaō on his back during a performance, a memorable moment in their collaborative work, writes Tomazinho Cardozo. Beyond their physical comedy, Leitaō also earned acclaim for his portrayals of Kunbi characters, drawing on his familiarity with the Kunbi dialect used by many native Goans. Leitaō's skills as a playwright were acknowledged for his creation of tiatrs that delved into contemporary events and societal matters pertinent to the Goan community, shedding light on these subjects on the Konkani theatrical platform. Leitaō's comedic career unfolded during a period dominated by two of the popular Konkani stage performers - Jacinto Vaz, known as the "Charlie Chaplin of the Konkani stage," and Anthony Mendes, the "Spring Man of the Konkani stage." Despite the prominence of these figures, Leitaō was able to establish his own respected place within the Konkani theatrical landscape through his talents, writes Cardozo. In the later stages of his career, Leitaō ultimately retired from the Konkani theatre due to the effects of advancing age and declining health.

== Personal life ==
Fernandes, who was also a professional tailor, ceased to participate in tiatrs performances since the early 1990s due to his poor health condition. He lived in the area of Tolleaband in Chinchinim, Goa, alongside his family. In his later years as a performer, Fernandes chose to go by the stage name "Jephsis Hitler," which have been influenced by his likeness to Adolf Hitler, especially when he incorporated a similar moustache into his comedic roles in tiatr productions. The name "Jephsis" was crafted from the initial letters of his first and middle names, José Francisco. While Fernandes engaged in Konkani theater performances, it served more as a recreational pursuit for him rather than a primary occupation. Accounts from writer John Gomes Kokoy suggest that Fernandes embraced the "Hitler" portion of his stage name, styling it to resemble the infamous 20th century dictator. Overall, Fernandes maintained a career as a tiatr performer during the mid-20th century, known by the distinctive stage name "Jephsis Hitler" which referenced both his own name and appearance.

According to the writings of Tomazinho Cardozo, Leitaő's participation in tiatrs was not solely driven by financial motivations. Instead, Cardozo suggests that Leitaō was more interested in being part of the theatrical production and taking on various roles that suited him. By profession, Leitaō was a tailor, and this occupation served as the primary means of income to support himself and his family. Cardozo also described Leitaö as a hardworking individual. Despite retiring from the Konkani tiatr stage due to his advanced age and declining health, Leitaō maintained an affection for the Konkani tiatr tradition. In a time of adversity for the Konkani tiatr stage, Leitaō affirmed the vitality of tiatr, a sentiment that remains ingrained within the Konkani tiatr community. On 22 October 1949, Leitaō married Esperança Maria Francisca Fernandes, a day laborer from Carmona, Goa, at the Chinchinim church. The couple's civil marriage was also recorded in Chinchinim, and they had five children together-three sons Newton (born 1957), Xaverino (born 1954), and Joanito (born 1950), and two daughters Maria (born 1951) and Feliciana (born 1963). Leitaō died on 31 March 1997, aged 71, at his residence in Tolleaband, Chinchinim, Goa.
