= Sabina Fernandes =

Indian actress and singer (born 1946)

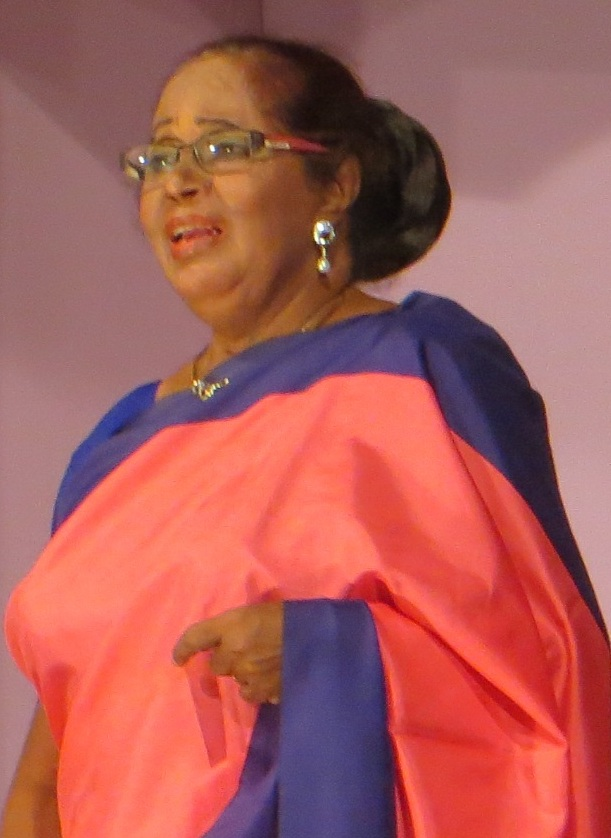
- Fernandes in Novo Dis Udetanam tiatr, 2014
- Born: Eusebia Feleciana Pereira; 13 August 1946 (age 80); Cortalim, Goa, Portuguese India, Portuguese Empire (now in India)
- Other name: Saibin
- Occupations: Actress; singer; producer; director
- Years active: 1960–present
- Spouse: Gregorio Fernandes (died 1999)
- Awards: TAG's "Lifetime Contribution to Tiatr Award" (2011)

Eusebia Feliciana "Sabina" Fernandes (born Eusebia Feleciana Pereira; born 13 August 1946) is an Indian actress, singer, theatrical producer, and theatre director known for her work in Konkani films and tiatr productions.

== Early life ==
In her youth, she was commonly referred to as "Saibin" (transl. Lady), a term of endearment that evolved into the nickname "Sabina." Despite being born in Goa, she received her education in Bombay, which was part of Bombay State (now Mumbai, Maharashtra, India). During her early years of education, she enjoyed engaging in activities such as music, dance, and drama as her preferred hobbies.

== Career ==
In 1960, Fernandes seized a significant opportunity in the theatrical realm when she secured a prominent role in the English play Scattered Feathers. Her acting abilities elicited acclaim and admiration from several individuals. During this theater performance, Master Vaz, a then-well-known personality in the tiatr industry, discovered Fernandes and offered her a significant role in his tiatr play called Bapui (Father). Residing in Juhu, Bombay, at the time, Fernandes eagerly embraced this initial opportunity within the tiatr domain. Her performance in Bapui proved transformative, propelling her to attain eminence as one of the most sought-after actresses on the tiatr stage. While Fernandes has graced the tiatr scene with her acting prowess in various productions, she remains etched in the memories of tiatr aficionados for her unforgettable portrayals in John Claro's Portuguez Kolvont (Portuguese Artist) and Aristides Dias' Divors (Divorce). In Portuguez Kolvont, Fernandes delivered a performance that significantly contributed to the success of the tiatr. This particular performance made history by running for more than 100 shows, establishing a record during that period. Similarly, Fernandes captivated audiences with her acting abilities in the tiatr Divors, which also enjoyed a successful streak of over 100 shows. Her contributions to these two tiatrs left an impression on the discerning tiatr-goers, firmly establishing Fernandes as an actress in high demand on the tiatr stage.

Fernandes is also a vocalist known for her singing abilities and extensive repertoire of duets performed on the tiatr stage. Collaborating with a diverse range of singers throughout her career, Fernandes garnered acclaim for her musical prowess. However, it was her duets alongside her husband, Greg de Candolim, that truly captivated the tiatr audience, earning popularity and high demand. These duets were distinguished by their clever wit, comedic flair, and have become cherished within the tiatr fraternity, leaving a mark on its history. In addition to her musical achievements, Fernandes has also made contributions to the world of acting. Her portrayal in the Konkani film Mhoji Ghorcarn (1969) garnered praise and showcased her talent. In her heyday, Fernandes was in high demand and had the honor of collaborating with popular directors of that era. She appeared in tiatrs written and directed by Konkani figures such as C. Alvares, M. Boyer, Alfred Rose, Remmie Colaço, Jacinto Vaz, Kid Boxer, Saib Rocha, Prem Kumar, Master Vaz, Nelson Afonso, Aristides Dias, Mike Mehta, John Claro, Roam Tony, Tony Sax, Wilson Mazarello, Mendes Brothers, Valente Mascarenhas, and others. Her versatility and skill as an actress were acknowledged and appreciated. Fernandes's contributions extended beyond the stage and screen. She and her husband, Greg, were instrumental in producing and directing seven tiatrs. Among them, works such as Ximiritint Sacrament (The Sacrament in Cemetery), Mhozo Titi (My Uncle), Gõycho Sadu (Goa's Sadhu), and Avoichim Dukam (Mother's Tears) showcased their creative vision and artistic finesse. Additionally, Fernandes ventured into the realm of audio production, lending her voice to various audio and video albums. Her commitment and talent propelled her to perform in over three thousand tiatrs, captivating, audiences not only in Goa but also across regions such as Maharashtra, Gujarat, Delhi, Karnataka, and even the Persian Gulf region, including the United Kingdom.

Author Wilson Mazarello acknowledges Fernandes as a talent who has held a leading position in the Konkani theater for several years. Her performances have garnered acclaim, both locally and internationally, as she has traveled extensively as a tiatrist, captivating audiences in diverse locations including the Persian Gulf and London. Throughout her career, Fernandes has displayed versatility and skill, embodying a wide range of characters. She excels in both serious and comedic roles, delivering performances that captivate audiences. Even as of 1995, Fernandes remains an active presence on the Konkani stage, captivating audiences with her character portrayals. Fernandes was one of the pioneering female actors who contributed to the Konkani stage alongside Josephine, Isalita, and Anita during the early years. Fernandes has also made appearances in Kala Academy (KA)'s annual tiatr competitions. She featured in Reggie Fernandes's tiatr Rater, where she was joined by cast members such as C. D'Silva and Inas de Canacona. This production secured the first prize in the competition. The prize-winning tiatr subsequently toured various locations in Sikkim, expanding Fernandes' reach and reputation. Additionally, in 1992, Femandes and her husband Greg were cast in Avers Pereira's tiatr Ixttagot (Friendship), produced under the banner of Antvers Production. This production brought together some of the popular artists from the Konkani stage, underscoring Fernandes' standing as a sought-after performer.

In November 2011, Fernandes secured the role of Maria in Derrick D'Mello's theatrical production titled Teag (Sacrifice). The play was featured at the 37th Tiatr Competition held at the Kala Academy in Panjim. Teag explored the emotional topic of children dealing with the death of their father in a tragic accident, while also navigating the impending separation from their mother, who was fighting cancer and leading a precarious existence.

In February 2013, Fernandes had the distinction of inaugurating the fourth edition of the Tiatr Festival, which was organized by the Tiatr Academy of Goa. The festival commenced at the Pai Tiatrist Auditorium, situated within the Ravindra Bhavan complex in Margao. Notable attendees included Prince Jacob, then-president of the Tiatr Academy of Goa, Joe Rose, then-vice president, and Victor de Sa, the member secretary.

In May 2018, Fernandes was chosen for the role of Margarida in Sharon Mazarello's tiatr production, Tukai Tench Assa (You share the same fate too). The play revolved around the lives of diverse families, shedding light on the challenges faced by parents left behind as their children migrated abroad in pursuit of better opportunities. These parents found themselves navigating the complexities of life during their twilight years, requiring self-reliance and resilience. Fernandes's co-actors included C. D'Silva, Jessie Dias, Josephine, Platilda Dias, Wilson Mazarello, Hortencio Pereira, Anthony San, and Marcelin de Betim.

On 17 December 2020, Fernandes was bestowed with the honor of being the guest of honor at the Tiatr Academy of Goa (TAG) Awards ceremony. The event commemorated the birth anniversary of Pai Tiatrist and featured the bestowal of "Lifetime Contribution Awards" in recognition of outstanding contributions to non-commercial khell and khell tiatrists. The awards ceremony unfolded in the grandeur of the main hall at Ravindra Bhavan in Margao, followed by a captivating cultural program presented by Tony de Ribandar and his troupe.

== Personal life ==
Fernandes married fellow Konkani actor and singer Gregorio Francisco Fernandes, known professionally by his stage name Greg de Candolim. She resided in the suburb of Juhu, Bombay during the early 1960s, and her residence in Bombay helped her initially to be discovered by Master Vaz. On 30 March 1999, Fernandes's husband died in Chicalim, Goa, at the age of 64. As of 2012, she resides in the census town of Chicalim.

== Awards ==
Throughout her career, Fernandes has been honored with several awards that recognize her talent and performances. In 2004, she received the Gulab Award for Best Actress and the Coca-Cola Award for her portrayal in the tiatr Tiatr Somplo Cholat Ghara (Tiatr is Ended, Go Home), written by the Konkani playwright Mario Menezes. Her acting skills were further acknowledged with a special award presented to her in London, UK for her performance in the tiatr Sounsar Sudorlo (The World Has Improved). Fernandes has been recognized and felicitated by various organizations for her significant contributions to the field of tiatr. Among them are the Kala Mogi, Candolim, Kuwait Goa Tiatristanchi Sounstha, Goa Konkani Academy, and Kala Academy Goa. In 2007–2008, she was honored with the Goa State Cultural Award in the field of tiatr, a testament to her impact on the art form.

In December 2011, Fernandes was bestowed with the Lifetime Contribution to Tiatr Award by the Tiatr Academy of Goa (TAG) during the 140th birth anniversary of the Father of tiatr, Pai Tiatrist, held at Ravindra Bhavan, Margao. This recognition was shared with nine other veteran tiatr artists, highlighting her long-standing career and dedication to the art form. Further adding to her list of accolades, Fernandes was honored with the TAG Award for Best Actor in a Negative Role (Female) in April 2014 for her performance in the tiatr Omtea Kollxear Udok (Pouring Water on an Upside-Down Pot) by Mario Menezes. Additionally, at the 27th Tiatr Competition 2001–2002, she received the Best Quartet Singer award alongside Dominic, Seby, and Joao for their contribution in the tiatr Duens (Sickness) by Domingos Cardoz. In the 37th Tiatr Competition 2011–2012, Fernandes was awarded a merit certificate for her acting in the role of Maria in the tiatr Teag (Sacrifice) by Derrick D'Mello.
