= Platilda Dias =

Indian singer and comedian (born 1949)

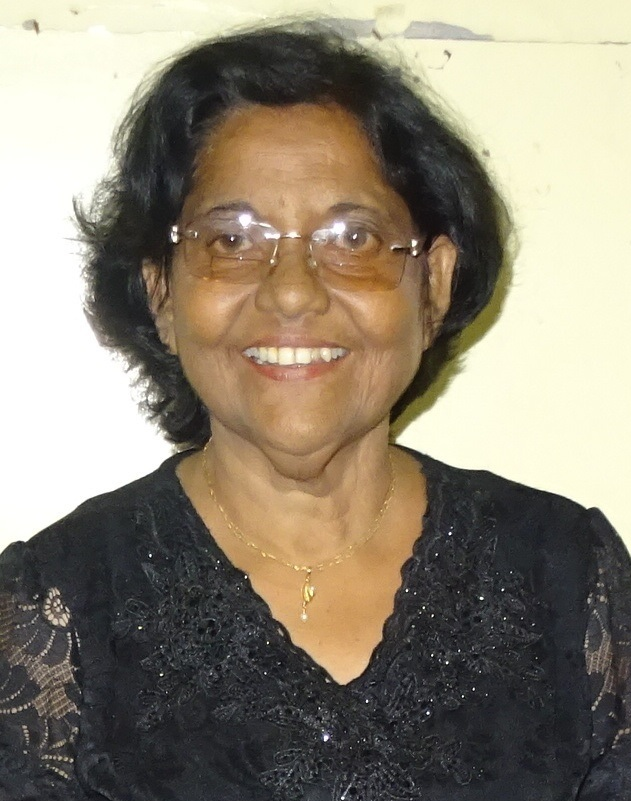
- Afonso in 2016
- Born: Maria Platilda Afonso; 2 August 1949 (age 76); Betalbatim, Goa, Portuguese India, Portuguese Empire (now in India)
- Education: Escola Commercial Tecnica (Lyceum)
- Occupations: Singer; comedian; actress
- Years active: 1959–2003; 2018–present
- Spouse: Ivo Dias
- Children: 4
- Awards: TAG's "Lifetime Contribution to Tiatr Award" (2010)
- Website: facebook.com/platilda.dias

Maria Platilda Afonso e Dias (born 2 August 1949) is an Indian singer, comedian, and actress known for her work in Konkani films, television, and tiatr (theatre) productions.

== Early life ==
Displaying a passion for music from an early age, Platilda began her singing journey during her school years. She actively participated in the church choir and engaged in singing competitions held at her school, often collaborating with her brother Aires. It is worth noting that Afonso's father was employed in Karachi, British India, while her mother possessed a singing voice. Around the year 1957–58, when Afonso was approximately eight years old, her residence became the site of an annual cross feast, located just outside their house. These feasts attracted the attention of the director of the nearby Portuguese school (known as Aula), who resided in their neighborhood and would attend the novenas (a series of nine religious devotions). During one such novena, Afonso and her brother Aires, who were studying in Portuguese, were inspired by the previous singers and spontaneously sang along with the rosary in Portuguese. Impressed by their talent, the organizers extended an invitation to Afonso and her brother to perform at one of the feasts. Following this, the local catholic priest in Betalbatim acknowledged Aires' talent in singing and extended an invitation to him to perform the song "Veronica" for the passion play during the Lent period at their parish church.

In 1959, Professor Alicia orchestrated a ceremony to commemorate her first prize achievement in paddy cultivation, which had been bestowed by the Portuguese administration that year. The event was graced by the presence of the Governor-general, who was invited to attend. During this gathering, Afonso and her brother Aires showcased their musical prowess, captivating the then Governor-general of Portuguese India, Manuel António Vassalo e Silva, who was specially summoned to present the award. Professor Alicia, director of Iscola de Portuguese, was honored with the Golden Konnos accolade. In the course of their performance, Afonso and her brother demonstrated their vocal talents, impressing the Governor-general to such an extent that he sought a personal encounter with them. Deeply moved by their abilities, he extended a generous offer of scholarships for their educational pursuits and graciously invited them to his residence in Porta de Gaspar Dias. In preparation for the occasion, Professor Tertoliano DSa, a violinist, trained Afonso and her brother in executing a harmonious Portuguese duet entitled "Que Saudades," which served as a tribute to the Governor-general, who did not comprehend the Konkani language. Subsequently, Afonso and her brother achieved recognition within their local community as accomplished singers. Later that same year, the village youth organized a theatrical production known as a "tiatr", a customary form of entertainment prevalent in rural areas during that era. Eager to include Afonso and Aires in the performance, they approached Afonso's mother for consent. However, her mother declined the request, citing the necessity of obtaining Afonso's father's authorization, as he happened to be situated in Karachi, British India at the time.

In the rural village of Betalbatim, a group of young boys, led by Afonso's future husband Ivo Dias, a tiatr writer, approached Professor Alicia with a request. Professor Alicia, in turn, approached Afonso's mother to obtain permission for Afonso and her brother to participate in their endeavors. Afonso's mother agreed to correspond with Afonso's father in Karachi, seeking his consent. After a period of correspondence, Afonso's father granted permission, taking into account the respectable backgrounds of the boys involved and their commitment to the village. Ivo provided the Afonso siblings with three songs: one solo for Aires, one solo for Afonso, and a duet for Afonso and her brother, Aires. Their performances in the village garnered acclaim, propelling them to local fame. As a result, they received an invitation to showcase their talent at the Majorda tiatr. Established tiatrists such as Jacinto Vaz, M. Dod de Verna, and Kid Boxer were also part of this event. Impressed by the singing abilities of Afonso and her brother Aires, these professionals expressed a keen interest in learning more about their background and place of residence. M. Dod, in particular, visited their home the very next day to meet Afonso's mother. Although initially hesitant, Afonso's mother eventually relented, granting permission for Afonso and Aires to participate exclusively in village tiatrs, provided that M. Dod would ensure their safe return. The siblings embarked on a series of village tiatrs, collaborating with both local playwrights and contractors. Through these engagements, Afonso and Aires had the opportunity to interact with established artists such as M. Boyer, Jacinto Vaz, Remmie Colaço, and the Trio Kings. In their debut tiatr under M. Dod's guidance, Afonso captivated audiences with a duet alongside her brother, garnering appreciation.

M. Boyer found himself in need of a young performer and selected Afonso's brother, Aires, to join him in Bombay for his theatrical production titled Kazarache Ratri (Wedding Night). Aires delivered a performance that received acclaim. In a subsequent production called Thevoi Thomas, written by M. Dod de Verna, Afonso and her brother were cast and embarked on an extensive tour for about year. Despite not receiving remuneration in the form of shares, they were generously gifted monetary contributions in envelopes by the audience as a token of appreciation for their performances in these local theater productions. In due course, Afonso and her brother became members of the Young Stars of Goa, a theater group formed by Nelson Afonso, where they established themselves as regular contributors to the tiatr scene as child artistes.

== Career ==
Afonso's talent gradually caught the attention of popular directors, propelling her into the spotlight. Initially performing alongside her brother Aires, she expanded her collaborations to include other male singers, showcasing her vocal abilities. Her talent attracted several male singers who eagerly sought to perform duets with her. Afonso's professional acting debut occurred in the tiatr production Dha Mandament (Ten Commandments), directed by Jephsis Hitler, where she entertained audiences with her acting skills. Subsequently, she received a growing number of offers, leading to her breakthrough role in the acclaimed tiatr Kantteantlem Ful (Thorn Flower), produced by Star of Curtorim. The performance was presented by members of the Young Stars of Goa collective. This widely performed production garnered significant praise in both Goa and Bombay, providing Afonso with extensive exposure and establishing her as a recognized figure in the realm of tiatr. During her stage career, Afonso married her fiancé Ivo Dias, who himself was a semi-professional tiatrist from their shared village. Following a hiatus to fulfill family commitments, Afonso made a return to the stage, captivating audiences once again with her performances.

Afonso became a leading figure in the field of Konkani theater during the 1990s, receiving significant support from her husband Ivo, who recognized her acting and singing abilities. Despite Ivo having retired from the stage, he encouraged Afonso to pursue her talents. Afonso successfully transitioned to comedy roles, establishing herself as the leading female comedienne in the Konkani theater scene. Afonso's mere presence on stage would elicit laughter from the audience. Her poise, along with her fluent delivery of the "Salcete-Konkani" or "Saxtti" dialect, charmed theatergoers and proved to be an aspect of her performances. Afonso's talent took her to various countries abroad, including the Gulf countries and the United Kingdom, where she captivated audiences with her acting skills as a tiatrist. Throughout Goa and Bombay, Afonso remained in high demand, consistently entertaining theater enthusiasts with her comedic roles. Her versatility extended beyond acting, as she showcased her singing prowess through audio cassettes and performances on platforms such as All India Radio and Doordarshan. Afonso's talent was not limited to the theater, as she also ventured into telefilms and was even considered for a significant role in a feature film during the mid-1990s. Over the course of her career, Afonso had the privilege of working with popular Konkani directors in the Konkani theater industry, including C. Alvares, M. Boyer, Remmie Colaço, Prem Kumar, Robin Vaz, Aristides Dias, M. Dod de Verna, J. P. Souzalin, Anthony D'Sa, Anthony Mendes, John Claro, and Mike Mehta. Furthermore, Afonso occasionally participated in non-stop shows, further demonstrating her talent and versatility as an artist.

Afonso, as a vocalist, exhibited her musical prowess by engaging in collaborative performances ranging from duos, duets, trios to quartets. A significant portion of her repertoire comprises compositions by her husband, Ivo, who is recognized for his adeptness as a lyricist and prior involvement in dramatic endeavors. While she frequently collaborated with her brother, Aires, in duets, Afonso also found success in partnering with Tony Sax and Luis Rod. Her artistic ventures have led her on extensive tours across the Gulf countries, where she has enthralled audiences through her participation in tiatr and khell-tiatr productions. Throughout her career, Afonso has embraced a diverse array of roles, embodying characters such as a mentally unstable woman, a youthful damsel, a comedic figure, simpleton, drunkard, Kunbi, mother, old lady, and various other archetypes, thereby showcasing her versatility as an actress. She harbors a particular sentiment towards her depiction of a university student in the theatrical production Hello Daddy, under the direction of Mike Mehta. Afonso showcased a portrayal as a genuine bhattkann (landlady) during a performance, that left an impression with the audience, astonishing spectators who failed to recognize her in that particular show. Her affinity for comedic roles and skill in uplifting the audience's spirits have made her a sought-after choice for directors of khell-tiatr productions. In 2018, Afonso made a return to the stage after a 15-year hiatus, gracing the tiatr production Tukai Tench Assa written and directed by Sharon Mazarello. In this production, she assumed the role of Marikin, a character fluent in Portuguese, alongside Wilson Mazarello, who portrayed Santu. Additionally, Afonso participated in a well-received trio performance alongside Josephine and Jessie Dias, which garnered an encore from the audience.

== Personal life ==
Afonso is the sibling of Aires, who also actively participated in the Konkani performing arts. Afonso entered into marriage with Venancio Antonio lyode Tadeu "Ivo" Dias, a former semi-professional tiatr writer and composer.

Afonso's success as an artiste can be attributed to her diligent approach to her craft. She is known for her meticulous study of scripts and her commitment to understanding and portraying her roles authentically. Drawing inspiration from individuals in her immediate environment, Afonso keenly observes their moods, mannerisms, and nuances, refining her performances accordingly. She places great importance on character development and portrayal. As of 2012, Afonso was a resident of Thondwaddo, Betalbatim, Goa.

=== The moustache incident ===
During a tiatr performance, Afonso was engaged to Jacinto Vaz, a fellow actor known for always donning a false mustache. However, a peculiar incident occurred on a particular day that led to an unexpected turn of events. As Afonso energetically moved about the stage, her hand inadvertently made contact with Jacinto's mustache, causing it to dislodge and fall off. The audience burst into laughter, much to Jacinto's dismay, as he felt his pride wounded. Sensing the need to rectify the situation, Afonso quickly devised a clever plan. With quick thinking, she addressed Jacinto, uttering the words, "Tum muge mai-paik muko friendly ass mhun kollot mhun heo mixeo laita nhu? Pun mhaka tum sarko kess dissot to choichea zaieo mixio nastanam," which loosely translates to, "Are you wearing this mustache in fear of my parents since you're so friendly with me? However, I'm curious to witness your appearance without it." Afonso's impromptu remark not only managed to salvage the performance but also garnered applause from the audience. In the aftermath of the scene, Jacinto's anger subsided, and he expressed his gratitude by embracing Afonso for her quick wit and ability to avert a potentially embarrassing situation.

== Selected stage works ==
Year	Title	Role	Notes	Ref
1960s	Untitled tiatr	Duo singer	Debut as singer	
1960s	Thevoi Thomas	Duo singer		
	Dha Mandament	Unnamed role	Debut as an actor	
	Kantteantlem Ful	Young girl from convent		
1980s	Hello Daddy	University student		
2018	Tukai Tench Assa	Marikin	Also trio singer	

== Select filmography ==
Year	Title	Role	Notes	Ref
1969	Mhoji Ghorkan	Unnamed role	Professional debut	
1988	Girestkai	Uncredited	Video film	
	Untitled film	Unnamed role		
