= C. D'Silva =

Indian actor and singer (born 1936)

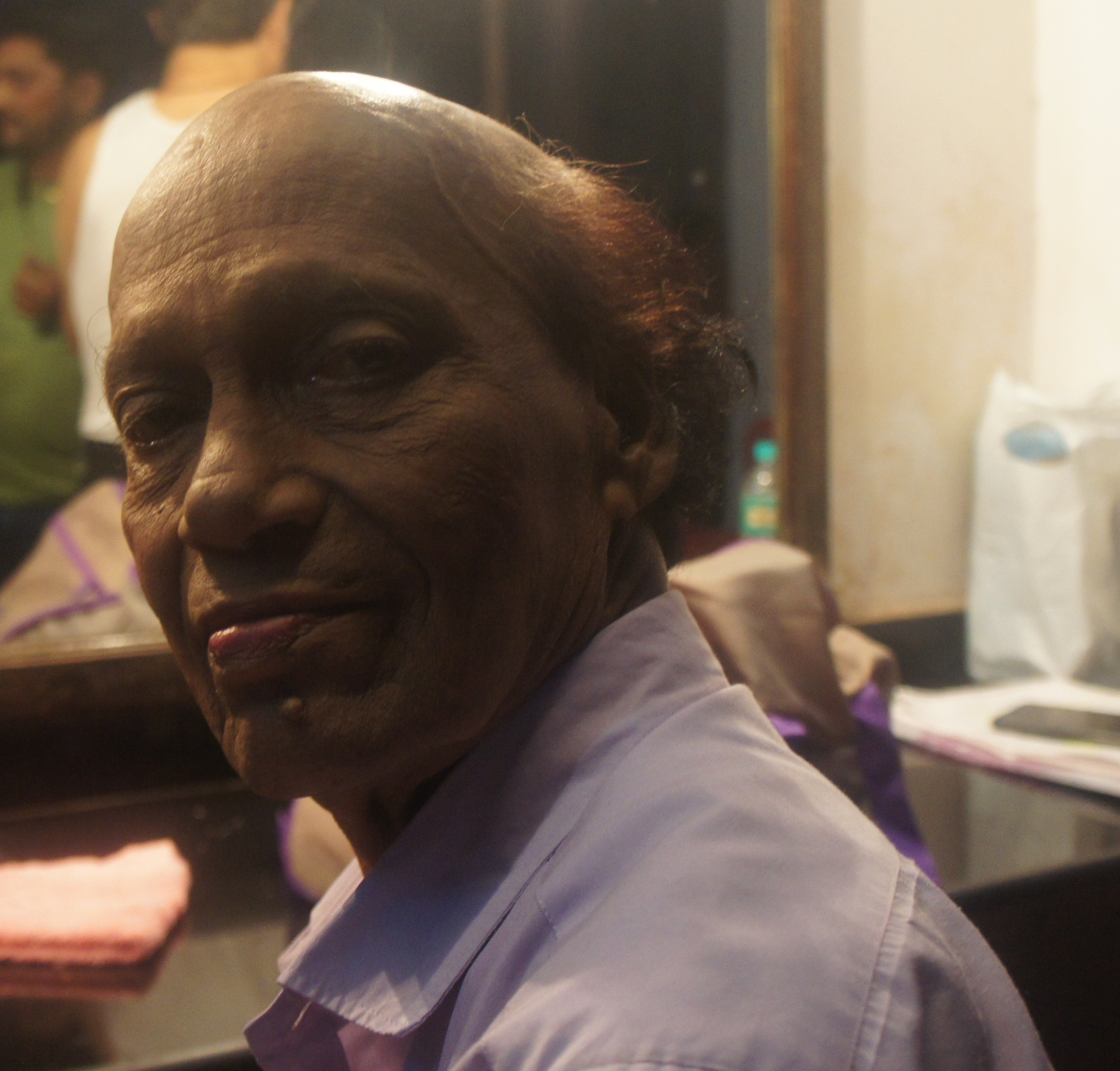
- D'Silva at Dis Ani Rat tiatr in Mapusa, 2023
- Born: Pedro Caitano D'Silva; 26 March 1936 (age 90); Per Seraulim, Goa, Portuguese India
- Other name: Daddy
- Occupations: Actor; singer; playwright; theatre director; prompter; restaurateur
- Years active: 1949–present
- Spouse: Luiza D'Silva
- Children: 4
- Relatives: Connie M (brother)
- C. D'Silva's voice D'Silva on the variety of roles he has played. Recorded 23 July 2023

Pedro Caitano D'Silva (born 26 March 1936), popularly known as C. D'Silva or Daddy, is an Indian actor, singer, playwright, theatre director, restaurateur, former makeup man, and prompter known for his work in Konkani films and tiatr productions. In a career spanning over seven decades, D'Silva has acted in over 100 tiatrs. Due to his ability to portray various characters, he was awarded the title "Man of a Thousand Faces".

An actor known for his ability to portray a wide range of characters throughout his career and handle multiple roles simultaneously. From his early days as a child artist to his portrayal of diverse roles such as an attractive lady, a toddy tapper, a policeman, a villain, and a hero, D'Silva demonstrated his talent and versatility in the tiatr industry. His ability to adapt to any role assigned to him earned him the nickname "Man of a Thousand Faces", given to him by prominent figures like Froilano Machado, the speaker of the Goa, Daman and Diu Legislative Assembly, and Bonaventure D'Pietro.

During his long-term collaboration with Nevel Gracias, a tiatr playwright whom D'Silva worked with for twelve consecutive years, he portrayed four different characters. Marcus Mergulhao of The Times of India writes, D'Silva seizes every opportunity to showcase his singing talent, using his voice and lyrics to great effect. His songs range from criticizing drama protagonists who belittled him and the future of tiatr, to paying homage to the pioneers of the art form.

== Early life ==
Pedro Caitano D'Silva was born on 26 March 1936 in Per Seraulim, Goa, which was a part of Portuguese India during the Portuguese Empire (now in India). His parents were Maria Rosalda Fernandes, who had a background in performing in khell tiatrs, and Joaquim Tomas da Silva, a seaman. When D'Silva's father learned about his son's early musical talents, he purchased two violins for him to support his musical pursuits.

== Career ==
During his teenage years, D'Silva was introduced to the Konkani stage when he was chosen to sing "Khad-mixeo," a song by Young Menezes, for a play at the Colva Church during a local feast. As a young and aspiring songwriter, D'Silva chose to interpret someone else's composition as he familiarized himself with the art form. However, the audience's response exceeded expectations. D'Silva vividly recalls being lifted from the stage by jubilant spectators who were thrilled with his performance. This event marked his debut as a child artist in Felicio Cardozo's Apounnem (Call) in 1949, launching his career on the Konkani stage.

In 1969, D'Silva achieved the milestone by writing his first tiatr, titled Hem Tuka Favo (You Deserve This). His passion for singing emerged at an early age, even during the colonial era when Goa was under Portuguese rule, during which he also performed Portuguese songs. In an interview with The Times of India, D'Silva expressed his enduring fondness for the song "Que Sera, Sera", but he emphasized that nothing compared to the sheer delight and satisfaction he experienced while singing in Konkani. D'Silva had the privilege of collaborating with prominent playwrights in Goa, which included M. Boyer, Prem Kumar, Remmie Colaco, John Claro, Jacinto Vaz, and Aristides Dias.

In an interview, D'Silva mentioned that he had enacted every type of role and enjoyed them all, although he admitted he never particularly liked wearing the khaki dress associated with Indian policemen. He found it difficult to explain his aversion to the uniform, which is also symbolic of postmen. Despite this, D'Silva embraced a wide variety of characters throughout his career.

Among D'Silva's performances, he played the role of a villain in Aristides Dias' Doulot (Wealth) at Mumbai's Rang Mandir theater, a performance that made him the target of public criticism for a brief period. Additionally, he portrayed a father consumed by lust for his daughter-in-law in another production. D'Silva was also recognized for his endearing portrayals of female characters and the beloved mauxi (aunt) role. It is said that D'Silva's talent shone brightest when he took on character lead roles, bringing out the best of his abilities as an actor.

One of D'Silva's productions, Bhangar (Gold), featured a memorable character named Dane Mauxi, which resonated with the audience. The inclusion of the popular song "Zuby Zuby" further heightened the enthusiasm of the crowd. Originally staged in the early 1980s, Bhangar achieved success with over 100 shows. Its revival in 2009 witnessed an additional 17 shows. D'Silva holds a special attachment to Bhangar, evident in the prominently displayed framed poster of the tiatr in his drawing room, which holds a unique place of honor among his collection.

In addition to Bhangar, D'Silva has produced an array of 33 home productions that have garnered widespread acclaim. Some of these works include Kazari Irmanv (Married Brother), Hench Tuka Favo (You Deserve This), Dennem (Blessing), Bongleachi Zali Ximiter (Bungalow Turned Cemetery), Loz Naslolo (Shameless), Mannkam Motiam, Mog (Love), Ganzil, Buniad (Foundation), Pixem (Crazy), Utor ani Upkar (Word And Favour), Kalliz (Heart), and Serial. Furthermore, D'Silva ventured into the realm of video films, leaving an impact with works such as Tujer Etoch and Buniad, which are particularly remembered. Additionally, his comedy acts in Kerala Topi and Budhvont Jackinas (Cunning Jackknas) have also garnered attention and appreciation from the audience.

Expressing his deep respect for the influential tiatrists (transl. tiatr performers) who laid a strong foundation for the genre, D'Silva has emphasized the importance of acknowledging and honoring their contributions. He feels hurt when the greats of tiatr are disrespected, and cherishes the memories of songs he sang as a teenager, although unfortunately, he never documented his own tiatrs or compositions, as they were lost to decay.

Beyond his home state of Goa, D'Silva has showcased his acting and singing skills in performances held in Mumbai, Karwar, and Malvan. He has participated in numerous tiatrs written by prominent playwrights such as M. Boyer, C. Alvares, Jacinto Vaz, Prem Kumar, Remmie Colaco, Robin Vaz, D'Lima, Aristides Dias, Rico Rod, John Claro, Anton Moraes, H Briton, Rosario Rodrigues, Patrick Dourado, Roseferns, Pascoal Rodrigues, Maxcy Pereira, and Nevel Gracias. Some other tiatrs in which he has appeared Map Bhortoch Vorta, Peleache Ostuchi Axea, Zonel (Window), Boreponn, Khoth, Ti Axea (That Greed), Shiksha (Lesson), Rag (Anger), Teag, Bandhpas, and Omthea Kollshear Udok.

== Personal life ==
D'Silva is married to Luiza, who is a homemaker. Together, they have four children: two sons named Anthony and Mario, and two daughters named Lourdina and Cleta. According to the 2012 Directory of Tiatr Artistes, D'Silva was reported to be residing in Colva, located in South Goa. However, as of 2013, The Times of India stated that he now resides in Per Seraulim, also situated in South Goa. D'Silva has expressed admiration for several actors, including C. Alvares, Minguel Rod, Cecilia Machado, Ophelia, Jessie Dias, Felcy, and Sharon Mazarello.

=== 2013 health setback ===
In February 2013, during the Carnival festival, D'Silva had an incident while performing at a musical show in Arlem, Raia. While singing on stage, he lost his balance and fell due to becoming entangled in the cables. This incident resulted in the immediate cancellation of the show. The following day, D'Silva discovered that he had temporarily lost the use of his wrists, causing him considerable pain. As a result, he had to take a hiatus from his career, which had spanned since 1949, for a period of four months in order to recuperate.

During his recovery, D'Silva received support from individuals whom he had never met before. They expressed their admiration and nostalgia for his music, often playing his songs in the background and fondly reminiscing about his televised performances on local networks. In an interview with The Times of India, D'Silva emphasized his commitment to his craft and stated that he would continue performing as long as he felt valued by his audience. He acknowledged that if the day ever arrived when he no longer felt appreciated, he would willingly step aside. Despite the setback, D'Silva's career continued to thrive, attracting a new generation of fans, particularly among the youth. His voice retains a melody and charm that remains difficult to overlook, as observed by Marcus Mergulhao, a writer for The Times of India.

=== The petrol bomb incident ===
During a performance of Aristides Dias' play Doulot (Wealth) at Bombay's Rang Mandir theater, an incident unfolded involving D'Silva, who was cast in the role of a villain. The portrayal of his character seemed to provoke strong reactions from the audience, leading to a disruptive incident. One individual in the crowd expressed their dissatisfaction by hurling a bottle onto the stage, narrowly missing D'Silva. However, the situation escalated when a second object, a petrol bomb, was thrown and struck him directly on the head. Alarmed and concerned for his safety, D'Silva quickly retreated backstage and informed the director that he could not continue performing.

Efforts were made to restore order and persuade D'Silva to resume his role as the villain. It was later revealed that the person responsible for the attack was evidently outraged by D'Silva's portrayal of the villainous character. In the play, his character would antagonize young children in an attempt to gain their mother's affection. This particular aspect of the performance did not resonate well with the audience, leading to their discontent.

=== The villainous father-in-law ===
Another instance of controversy arose when D'Silva depicted a father who exhibited inappropriate desires towards his daughter-in-law. When his character unexpectedly grabbed her hand, the crowd grew restless, with some members expressing their displeasure through verbal outbursts. Fortunately, no further physical attacks occurred during this particular incident. Despite the challenges and controversies faced, D'Silva's portrayal as the villain ultimately left an impact and garnered recognition. In fact, his performance and the overall production earned the top prize at the tiatr competition.

== Select filmography ==
=== Video films ===
Year	Title	Role	Notes	Ref
2006	Buniad	Actor	Also writer & director	
2007	Budhvont Jackinas	Farmer/milkman		
	Kerala Topi	Comedian		
	Tujer Etoch			

== Selected stage works ==
Year	Title	Role	Notes	Ref
1949	Apounnem	Child artist	Debut tiatr	
1953	Kazari Irmanv		Writer/director	
1969	Hem Tuka Favo		Writer	
1975	Dennem		Writer/director	
1976	Bongleachi Zali Ximiter		Writer/director	
1980	Pixem	Comedian & singer	Also writer/director	
1980s	Bhangar	Dane Mauxi	Also writer/director	
1996	Ganjil		Writer/director	
	Doulot	Villain		
	Loz Naslolo		Writer/director	
	Mannkam Motiam		Writer/director	
	Mog		Writer/director	
	Utor ani Upkar		Writer/director	
	Kalliz		Writer/director	
	Serial		Writer/director	
	Map Bhortoch Vorta			
	Peleache Ostuchi Axea			
	Zonel		Writer/director	
	Boreponn		Writer/director	
	Khoth		Writer/director	
	Shiksha			
	Rag			
	Teag			
	Bandhpas			
	Omthea Kollshear Udok			
2012	Ti Axea		Writer	
2023	Dis Ani Rat	Singer		

== Select discography ==
=== Audio albums ===
- Devache Kaide
- Tiatramchim Xembhor Vorsam
- Okman
- Viktem Mellonam
- Farikponn (2009)
- Gaonkar
- Pai Tiatrist
