= Goa Medical College =

Government medical school in Goa, India

Coordinates: 15°27′47″N 73°51′28″E

- Colégio Médico de Goa
- Seal of Goa Medical College
- Other name: GMC
- Motto in English: Truth is Eternal and Beautiful.
- Type: Health Services, Medical Education and Research Institution
- Established: 5 November 1842; 183 years ago (as Medical-Surgical School of Goa); 1963; 63 years ago (as GMC)
- Affiliations: National Medical Commission
- Academic affiliations: Goa University
- Dean: Dr. Shivanand M. Bandekar
- Administrative staff: 2048
- Undergraduates: 200
- Postgraduates: 31 (MD students); 13 (MS students); 30 (Diploma students)
- Location: Bambolim, Goa, India
- Campus: Urban 1,134,798 m^{2}
- Website: www.gmc.goa.gov.in, www.gmcmec.gov.in

Goa Medical College (GMC) is a public medical college and hospital located in Goa, India. It is one of the oldest medical colleges in Asia. The medical college is affiliated to the Goa University (GU), being its oldest unit.

== History ==
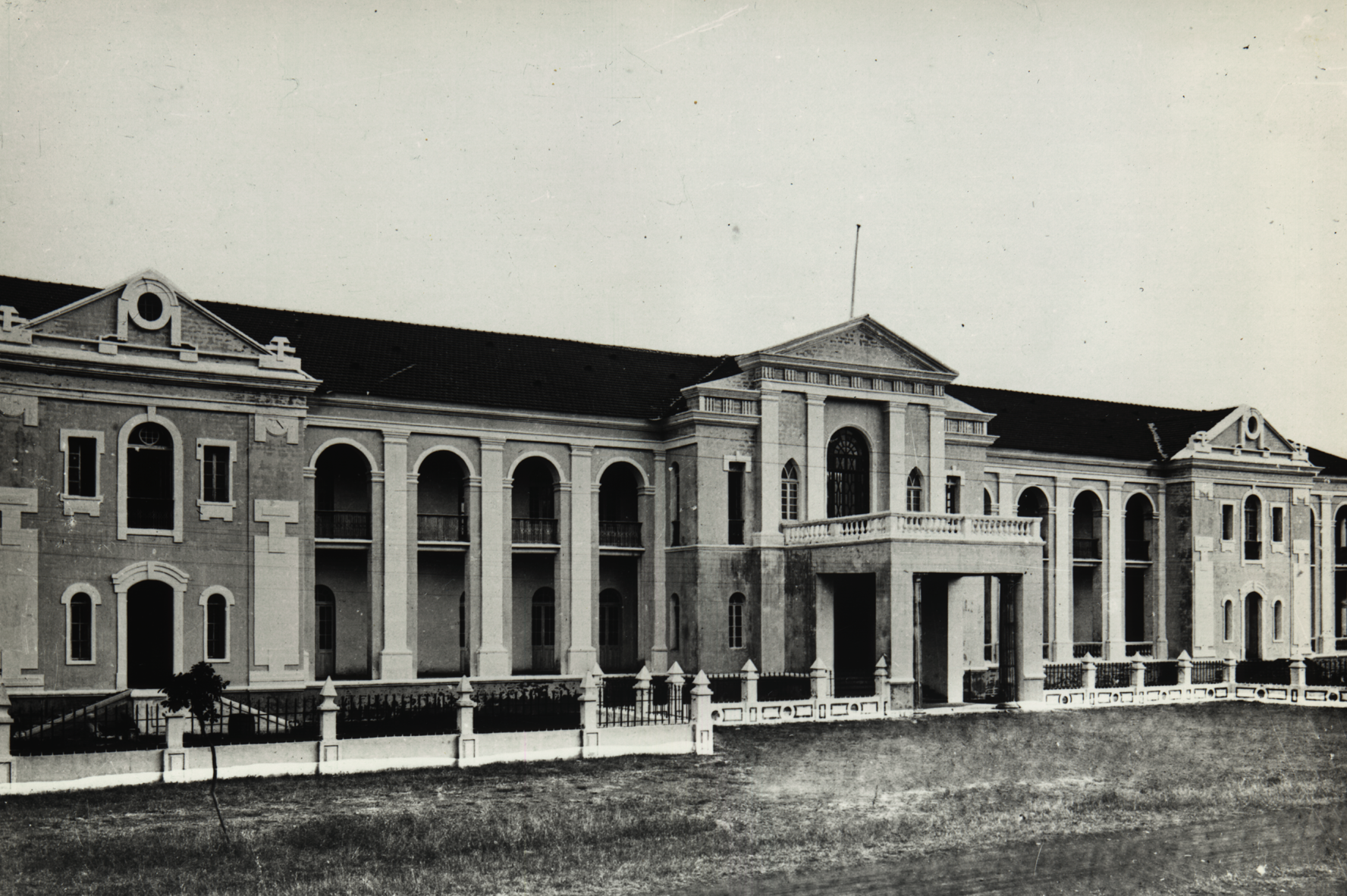
GMC building in Goa.

Since the last decades of the sixteenth century Goa was known as the "cemetery of the Portuguese", in the expression of the Viceroy Francisco de Távora, 1st Count of Alvor. The unhealthiness of the Old Goa was manifest, given the density of the population, which was accompanied by a lack of hygiene and medical care. Until then, doctors in Portuguese India were rare.

The course of medical education in Goa, therefore, began in 1691, when the "chief physicist" (a name given to doctors appointed as head of public health of a given territory) Manoel Roiz de Sousa began a "Medicine Class of Nova Goa", coming from the request made by the Viceroy of India Rodrigo da Costa, functioning intermittently in the eighteenth century. In 1801, the Portuguese crown decided to establish the "Medicine and Surgery Class", to the care of the chief physicist António José de Miranda e Almeida, graduated from Coimbra. This course worked until 1815, when the doctor left Goa.

However, it was only on 5 November 1842 when the "Medical-Surgical School of Goa" got its definitive start. The institution remained in operation even after 11 December 1851, when, through a ministerial report and annexed decree, the colonial government extinguished some medical schools surviving only that of Goa. During that period, it produced some 1,327 doctors and 469 pharmacists.

During the military annexation of Goa, undertaken by India in 1961, the school was administered by the University of Bombay. In 1986, it came under the administration of the Goa University (GU), changing the denomination "Medical-Surgical School" to "Medical College".

Originally located in the center of Panjim, in a structure of Portuguese origin, it was transferred to Bambolim in 1993, being part of the medical-hospital teaching complex of GU.

== Organization ==
The Institute of Psychiatry and Human Behaviour (Bambolim), the T.B. Cunha and Chest disease hospital (St. Inez), the Rural Health and Training Centre (Mandur-Old Goa) and the Urban Health Centre (St. Cruz) form parts of the Establishment. The college is affiliated to the Goa University and offers the MBBS course alongside several MS and MD courses. Some courses with some super-specializations are also awarded.

Goa Medical College (GMC) and Goa Dental College are located opposite each other on the highway connecting Goa's capital Panjim with its commercial capital, Margao. A pedestrian subway has been constructed to connect both institutes.

As a part of their compulsory rotational internship in the department of preventive and social medicine, the MBBS interns are also posted in the Sankhle Community Health Centre for 15 days along with the Junior Residents of the same department.

The current acting Dean of Goa Medical College is Dr. S. M. Banderkar, an orthopedic surgeon.

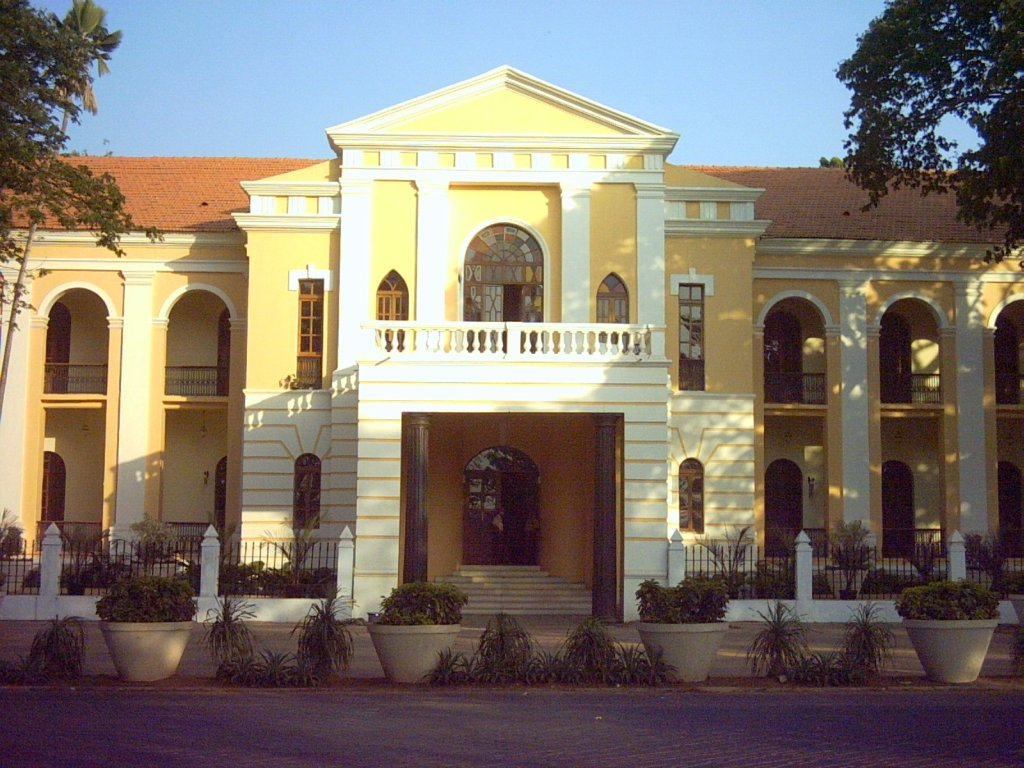
The former building is now used as the offices for the Entertainment Society of Goa (ESG).

== Admissions ==
200 MBBS and 60 allied health seats filled through NEET-UG. It has an intake of 86 seats for PG courses in which 50% is by All India Quota through NEET-PG.

== Courses ==
Goa Medical College offers following courses:

=== UG Course ===
M.B.B.S. - extending for at least a period of 4.5 years followed by 1 year of compulsory rotational internship.

=== PG Courses ===
==== M.D. ====
- Anesthesiology
- Biochemistry
- Dermatology and Venereal Diseases
- Diagnostic Radiology
- Forensic Medicine and Toxicology
- General Medicine
- Microbiology and Infectious Diseases
- Pediatrics
- Pathology
- Pharmacology
- Physiology
- Psychiatry
- Preventive & Social Medicine
- Pulmonary Medicine
- Radio-diagnosis

==== M.S. ====
- Anatomy
- General Surgery
- Obstetrics and Gynaecology
- Ophthalmology
- Orthopaedics
- Otorhinolaryngology

==== P.G. Diploma Courses ====
- Anesthesia
- Diagnostic radiology
- Obstetrics & Gynaecology
- Pediatrics
- Psychological Medicine
- Public Health
- Forensic Medicine (Not yet recognized by NMC)
- Dermatology & VD (Not yet recognized by NMC)

== Notable alumni ==
- Dr. Froilano de Mello
- Dr. Francisco Luís Gomes
- Agostinho Fernandes (1932–2015), Goan novelist

== See also ==
- Goa University
- Goa Engineering College
