= Agostinho Fernandes =

Portuguese writer and cardiologist (1932–2015)

- Born: 2 July 1932; Quepem, Goa, Portuguese India
- Died: 29 June 2015 (aged 82); Portugal
- Education: Escola Médica Cirúrgica de Goa
- Occupations: Writer; cardiologist
- Relatives: John Claro (brother)
- Writing career
- Language: Portuguese; Konkani
- Period: c. 1962–2007

Agostinho Fernandes (2 July 1932 – 29 June 2015) was a Portuguese writer and cardiologist who was the author of one of Goa's key post-colonial novels, Bodki (1962), which had attracted significant critical attention.

== Biography ==
Fernandes studied at the Liceu Nacional Afonso de Albuquerque before matriculating at the Escola Médica Cirúrgica de Goa; he considered working in Goa but won a place at the Universidade de Coimbra to develop his medical training. His first job (1960–62) was directing the campaign against sleeping sickness in Angola. He returned to Portugal and from 1974 to 1982 was a cardiologist at Centro Hospitalar das Caldas da Rainha, as well as working in other hospitals such as the Hospital de Santa Maria, Lisbon. He was a Member of Sociedade Portuguesa de Cardiologia and the European Society of Cardiology. He was the brother of John Claro, who became a noted tiatr writer and director.

== Works ==
Fernandes's most famous work is the Portuguese-language novel Bodki (1962). In the words of Everton V. Machado,

The constant clash between modern convictions of the elite raised in a Christian environment and the popular beliefs among the lower social strata of Goa must be re-emphasized within the set of Indo-Portuguese themes, as is very clearly illustrated in the novel Bodki ... In it, a young physician from the capital finds himself confronting the superstitions of the people of a village, especially those who marginalize the bodki, a Hindu widow, considered to be responsible for all the bad happenings that took place there.

Fernandes was involved in journalism in Goa, Angola and Portugal; wrote a number of unpublished plays in Konkani; and the poetry collection Os Meus proprios pedaços. He also wrote the novel Por além do além, published in 2007.
