= Connie M =

Indian singer and actor (born 1948)

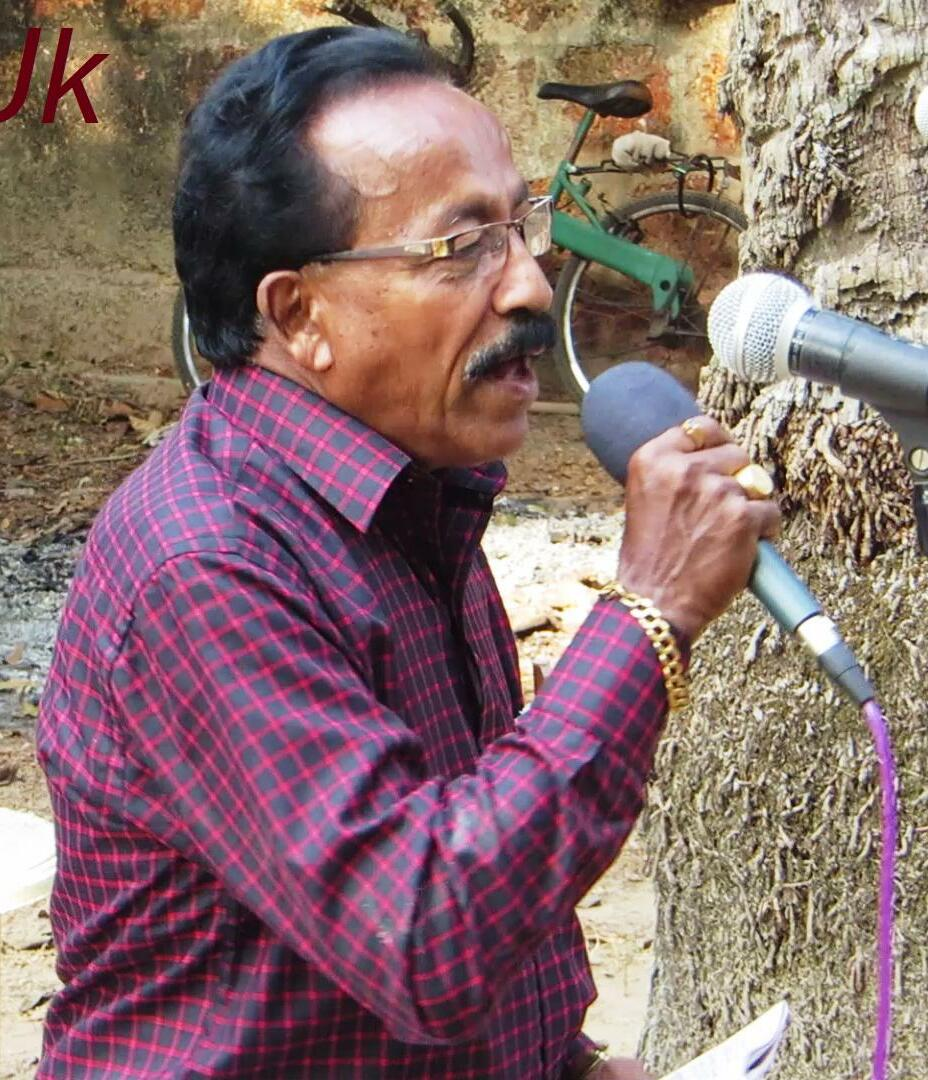
- D'Silva during Goa Carnival, 2013
- Born: Conceicão Diogo da Silva; 21 August 1948 (age 77); Per-Seraulim, Goa, Portuguese India, Portuguese Empire (now in India)
- Other names: Conceicao Diogo D’Silva
- Occupations: Singer; actor; drummer; playwright
- Years active: 1965–present
- Spouse: Jeromina da Silva
- Relatives: C. D'Silva (brother)
- Musical career
- Origin: Goa, India
- Genres: Beat music
- Instruments: Vocals; drums
- Member of: Fantasy
- Formerly of: Ignatius & His Swing Band; Ebony; CIC Band; Luis & his Melodians; Radio Serenaders; AVC Pops; Melody Makers
- Website: facebook.com/conniem.dsilva

Conceicão Diogo da Silva (born 21 August 1948), known professionally as Connie M, is an Indian singer, actor, drummer, and playwright who works on the Konkani stage.

== Early life ==
Conceicao had five siblings, two sisters named Escolastica and Catarina, and three brothers named C. D'Silva, a Konkani actor and singer, Agnelo, and Constancio.

== Career ==
In 1960, D'Silva's older brother, Constancio Menino, gifted D'Silva his first drum set. This encouraged D'Silva, who lacked the means to purchase his own equipment, to pursue his passion for drumming.

In 1965, D'Silva joined Ignatius & His Swing Band as their drummer. Notably, during that same year, he impressed the audience with a performance that nearly caused damage to the drum set and left him with a torn T-shirt. As beat groups grew popular, D'Silva found himself drumming for Ebony, where his talent gained him recognition as a drummer for weddings and beat shows.

Subsequently, D'Silva was a drummer for a succession of bands including CIC Band (Raia, Goa), Luis & his Melodians, Radio Serenaders, AVC Pops, and Melody Makers. In 1983, he established his own ensemble, Fantasy, which became one of the most popular dance bands of the 1980s. They performed at numerous weddings and dances, with festivities often commencing at 10 p.m. and extending well into the early hours of the morning.

In addition to his drumming skills, D'Silva held a deep fascination for the traditional Konkani tiatr, a form of musical theater. During his formative years, he participated in various productions and sang humorous songs. His brother C. D'Silva, a Konkani actor and singer, helped D'Silva nurture his singing talent. He began acting with appearances in Santos de Arossim's Catkar (Cheater) and Casiano D'Costa's tiatr Kuniad (Brother-in-law). D'Silva frequently collaborated with his brother C. D'Silva, who was known for his skill in portraying multiple characters on stage.

D'Silva, as a musician, spent 37 years mastering the art of drumming. However, in 2002, he was forced to stop his drumming due to disagreements with his band members, who insisted on incorporating recorded music into their performances, rather than relying solely on live instrumentation. D'Silva had been an integral part of the band Fantasy, which had gained popularity at beat shows in Salcete and the now-disbanded Arlem Festival.

After quitting drumming, D'Silva focused on singing Konkani songs for tiatrs (Goa musical dramas) and other musical shows. The Navhind Times wrote, "D'Silva captivated audiences with his own compositions, earning widespread acclaim in various productions under the direction of figures such as Patrick Dourado, Rafael Noel, Prince Jacob, Ben Evangelisto, Oldrin Sequeira Tony Dias, and many others".

While D'Silva's musical pursuits offered him opportunities to perform abroad, including onboard cruise liners with his band, it was his active involvement in the Konkani stage that allowed him a larger international audience. Throughout his career, D'Silva has been an admirer of Alfred Rose, a Konkani singer. D'Silva continues to honour Rose's legacy by incorporating Rose's songs into his own repertoire, alongside his own compositions.

Following the launch of his sixth CD, Best of Connie M, D'Silva made the decision to retire from regular performances, reserving his appearances for select and special occasions.

== Awards ==
D'Silva has been honoured with the "Goa State Cultural Award" in the field of music for the year 2007–2008. He was recognized for his lyrical composition in the tiatr performances Family Day and Kurl'leo, winning the "Best Lyrics" prize for his songs, "Osotori", and "Moronn", respectively. Furthermore, D'Silva received a special acknowledgement from the Ravindra Bhavan, Margao for his significant contributions to the tiatr domain.

== Selected stage works ==
Year	Title	Role	Notes	Ref
	Catkar	Singer		
	Kuniad	Singer		
1980s	Nichev	Co-writer		
	Divorce	Drummer		
	Goencho Saib	Actor		
	Ti Moji Maim	Actor		
	Rupnnem	Singer		
2004	Devak Zai Zalear	Singer		
2005	Roddonaka	Actor		
2009	Mahanand Monis Vo Soitan?	Singer		
