= Institute of Psychiatry and Human Behaviour =

- Government of Goa

Geography
- Location: Bambolim, Goa, India
- Coordinates: 15.452432°N 73.860826°E

Organisation
- Type: Specialist
- Affiliated university: Goa Medical College

Services
- Beds: 190
- Speciality: Psychiatric hospital

History
- Former name: Abbe de Faria Institute
- Opened: 1980

Links
- Website: iphb.goa.gov.in
- Lists: Hospitals in India

The Institute of Psychiatry and Human Behavior, Bambolim, Goa, India is a psychiatric hospital and part of the Goa Medical College (GMC). It deals with the treatment and investigation of mentally ill patients. Posting students in clinics and interns, as a part of the MBBS course, is also done here. It is approximately a kilometer away from GMC opposite Bambolim Church, a landmark.

== Services ==
The IPHB primarily seeks to provide preventive, curative and rehabilitative mental health services to the people of Goa and its neighbouring states such as Maharashtra and Karnataka.

The bed strength of the hospital was 190 beds. IPHB has closed wards as well as open wards for male and female patients separately. In open wards patients have to be accompanied by relatives or caretakers.
