= A. S. Conception =

Indian singer and actor (1928–1986)

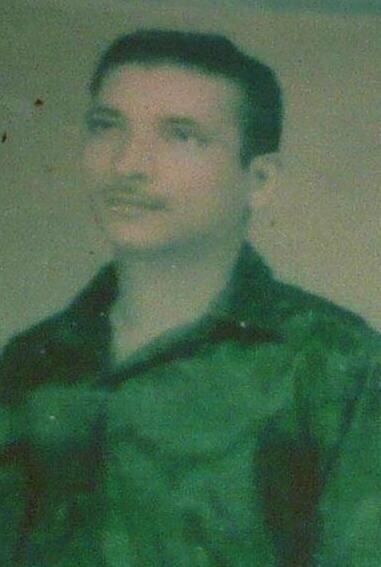
- Conceição during his youth
- Born: Aniceto Salvador da Conceição; 26 April 1928; Vasco da Gama, Goa, Portuguese India, Portuguese Empire (now in India)
- Died: 16 July 1986 (aged 58); Vasco da Gama, Goa, India
- Occupations: Singer; theatre actor; playwright; director
- Years active: 1953–1980
- Title: Founder of All Goa Dramatic Stars; Co-founder of Stars of the Goa Stage (later Young Stars of Goa)
- Spouse: Maria Viegas (m. 1958)

Aniceto Salvador da Conceição (26 April 1928 – 16 July 1986), known professionally as A. S. Conception, was an Indian singer, theatre actor, playwright, and theatre director who worked on the Konkani stage.

== Early life ==
Aniceto Salvador da Conceição was born on 26 April 1928 in Vasco da Gama, Goa, which was part of Portuguese India during the Portuguese Empire. The fourth of four children, he had two brothers, Gabriel (b. 1920) and Antonio (b. 1922), as well as a sister named Prudencia (b. 1926). Conceição was born to Gregorio Piedade da Conceição, an employee, and Maria Tereza Xavier, a homemaker, into a Goan Catholic family. Both of his parents hailed from the village of Quelossim. Following his early education in Goa, he ventured to Bombay, to commence his journey in the field of acting.

== Career ==
Conceição rose to prominence in Bombay. His journey began when he was afforded the opportunity to perform in one of Jackdom's tiatrs. Jackdom, a playwright and director, frequently staged tiatrs in Bombay and played a pivotal role in Conceição's emergence as an actor, despite them not having a personal acquaintance at the time. Conceição was introduced to the commercial tiatr stage by Romaldo Fernandes, who brought him into Victor Mittmitto's tiatr in 1953. Mittmitto, a singer, facilitated Conceição's introduction to Jackdom. It was through Mittmitto's efforts that Conceição made his initial foray onto the Konkani stage. He left an impression on the audience, propelling him to popularity and opening doors to numerous acting opportunities. Initially starting as a singer, Conceição showcased his skills by delivering comic solos and portraying female characters. He also performed duets alongside Romaldo Fernandes, earning praise from the audience. As a result of his growing popularity, other directors began casting him in small female roles and featuring his songs in their tiatrs.

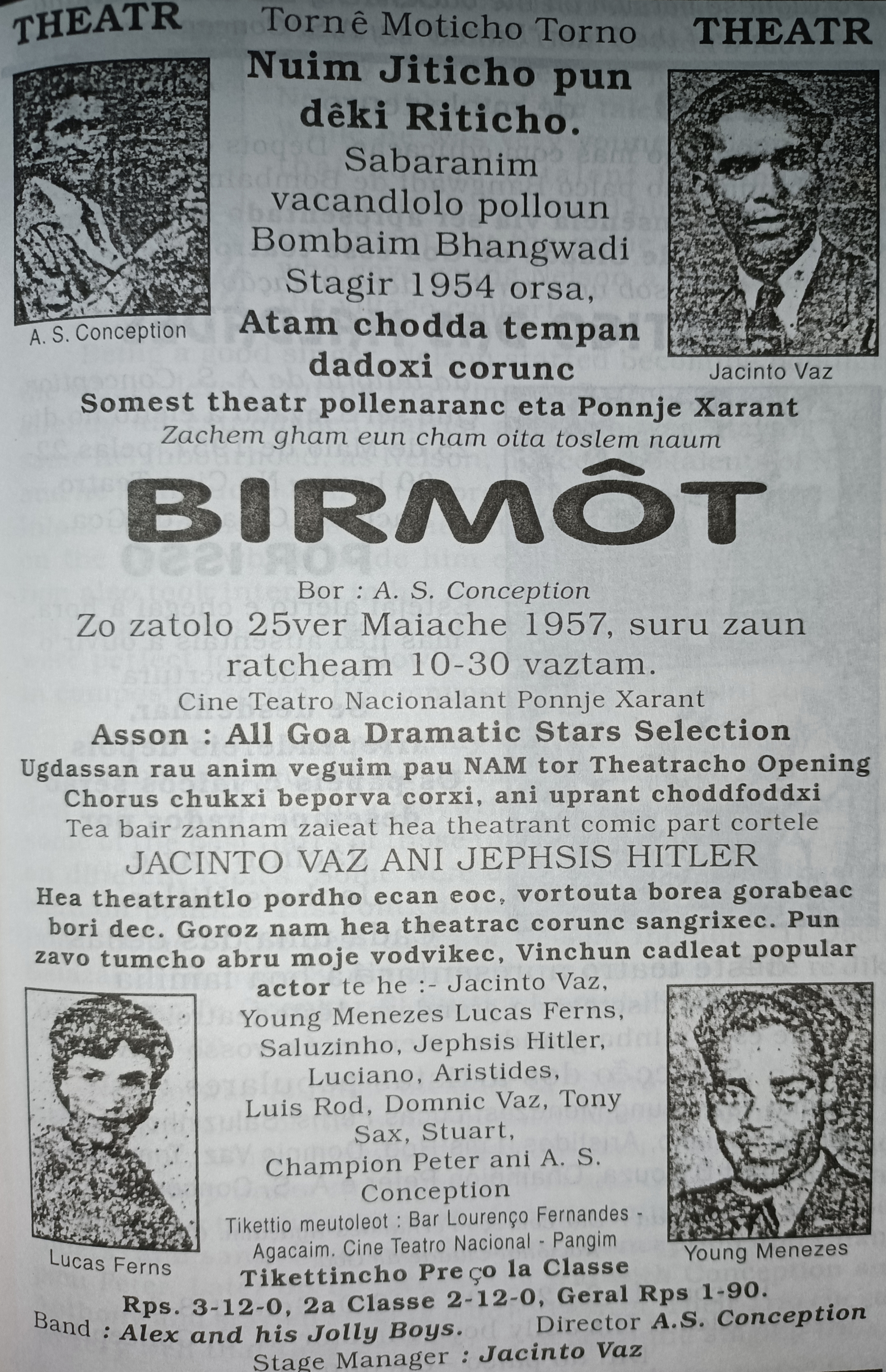
Handbill of the tiatr Birmôt (Mercy) by Conceição in the Konkani language

In 1953, Conceição began touring as a singer in Goa with C. Alvares' group during the performance of their tiatr Mauxi Vo Paichi Bail (Aunt or Father's Wife?). After returning to Bombay, he acted in Camil Bottler, a tiatr directed by A. R. Souza Ferrão and written by John Claro. He also composed and performed the opening chorus for this tiatr. On 11 June 1954, Conceição's final appearance was in Bombay at Princess Theatre, Bhangwadi, in C. Alvares' tiatr Jurament. He then moved to Goa and worked as a foreman in M/s. Pandurang Timblo Industries in Vasco da Gama, Goa. During his stay in Goa, he remained active in dramatic pursuits, participating in the local tradition of tiatrs, which were predominantly staged at night and occasionally extended into the early hours of the morning. Despite the demanding schedule of nighttime performances and daytime work, he continued to act in various tiatrs directed by both commercial and non-commercial tiatrists. Conceição also ventured into playwriting, debuting his tiatr script Birmôt (Mercy) in Bombay in 1954, which was well-received. In 1957, he staged Birmôt in Goa, forming his own troupe named the All Goa Dramatic Stars. Over time, the group evolved and was rechristened as the Stars of the Goa Stage.

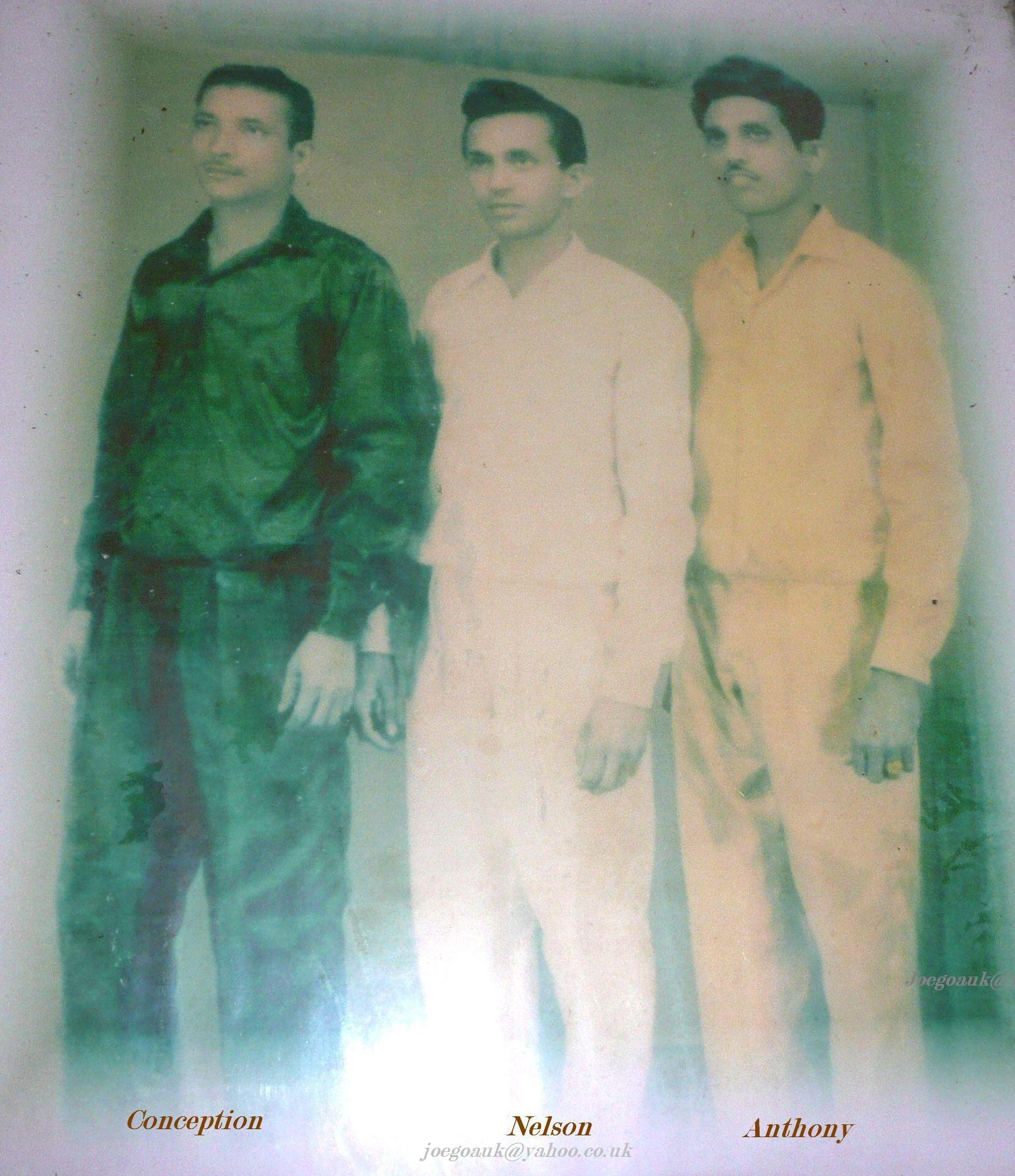
The Conception-Nelson-Anthony trio

Conceição's troupe comprised an ensemble of artistes, including composers and vocalists. During their time in Goa, Conceição encountered Nelson Afonso and Anthony D'Souza. Initially, Conceição collaborated with Nelson, forming a duet where Nelson assumed the female roles. Together, they established the Conception-Nelson-Anthony trio, which quickly gained acclaim and became one of the most popular trios of recent years. Conceição assumed the leadership role within this trio, which served as a driving force for the entire group. They were also recognized as the audacious trio of the Konkani stage, receiving support from the public. Referred to as the "Political Blasters," their performances exposed and criticized corrupt practices within the government, political circles, and self-proclaimed leaders. They brought attention to misguided policies implemented by both the central and state government during the Portuguese rule and after Goa's liberation. No department, whether it be the police, Public Works Department (PWD), Municipalities, or any other, escaped their scrutiny. When the trio took the stage, Conceição would be the first to appear, receiving a reception marked by thunderous applause, enthusiastic cheers, and even the ignition of fireworks and locally-crafted explosives outside the performance venue. Following Nelson's demise, the trio underwent a name change to Conception-Souza Boy-Anthony, with the inclusion of Souza Boy in the lineup.

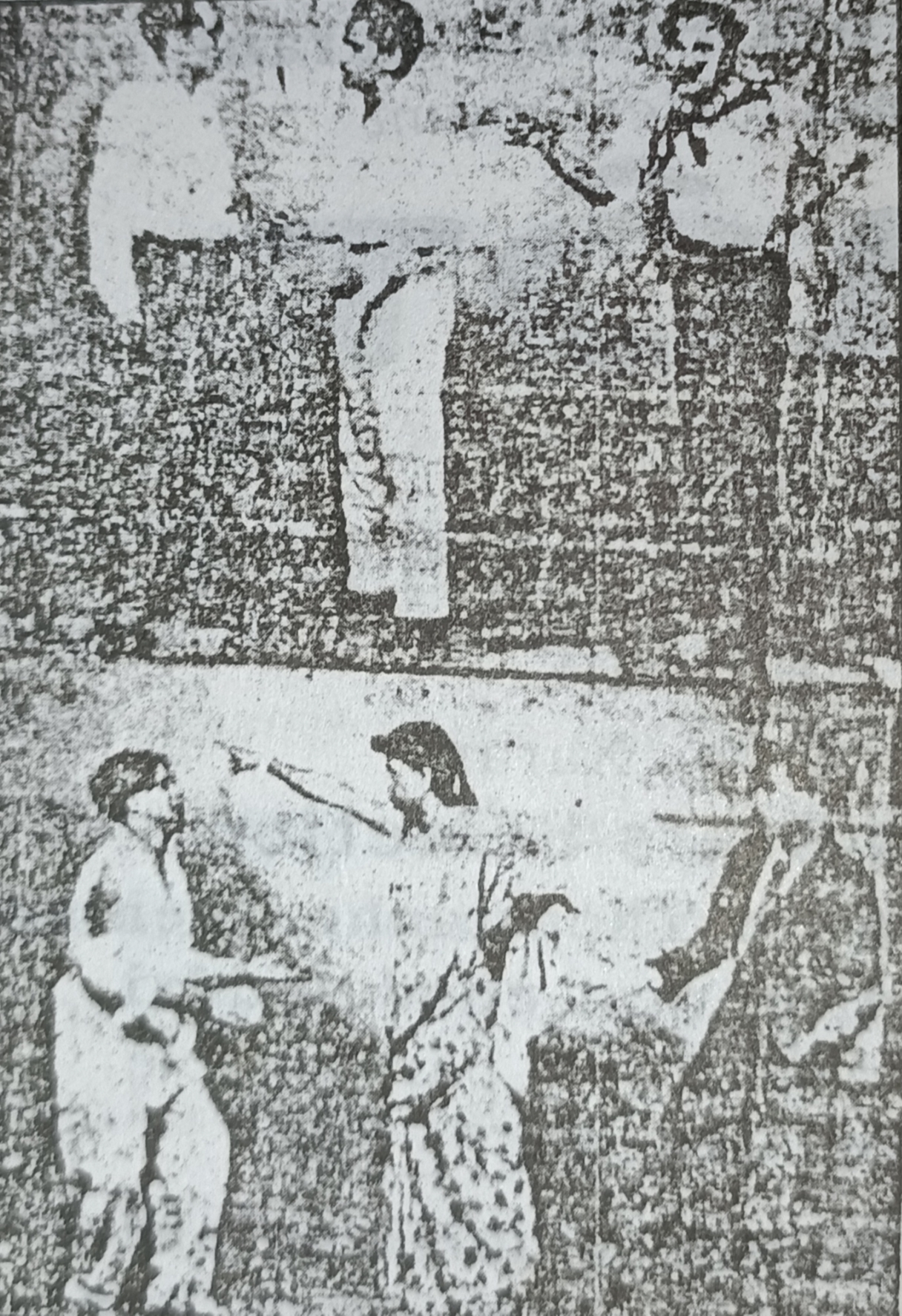
Two scenes from the tiatr Birmôt, first staged in 1954 and later in 1957

Conception-Nelson-Anthony, with their musical companions, achieved fame for their politically-themed songs known as trios. These compositions captivated the public's attention as they addressed a range of political issues, gaining favor among the populace due to their ability to articulate the sentiments of the common man and provide critical perspectives on the government and its various departments. At a certain point, the presence of the trio guaranteed a sold-out audience for any tiatr performance. Conceição's acting abilities further contributed to their success. Known for his talent, he consistently took on the leading roles in their theatrical productions, portraying characters with such nuance that finding a suitable replacement for him proved to be a daunting task. Conceição's performances had the capacity to elevate even the most lackluster plotlines in their tiatrs (Goan musical theatre). Together with the trio Conception Nelson-Anthony, he co-directed the popular tiatr production titled Lokak Lagon (Due to People) on 15 April 1963, at the Municipal Garden in Vasco da Gama, Goa. In addition to his directorial work on his own tiatr, Birmôt, Conceição also lent his directorial expertise to other productions such as Piddeacho Khuris (Cross of Coconut frond) by Dr. V. Antão and Gottalo. The playwrights within their group consistently crafted special roles tailored to Conceição's talents, highlighting his artistry. As a result, he rose to prominence as one of the most popular artists within the tiatr industry, with his performances and success in character portrayals solidifying his reputation as a household name.

Conceição became known through his performances in Aristides Dias' plays Divors (Divorce) and Doiea (Pity). Displaying a distinct inclination towards tragic roles, Conceição found his artistic prowess most effectively expressed in these emotionally charged portrayals. His devotion to the tiatr stage, a traditional Goan theater form, earned him the respect of veteran directors such as A. R. Souza Ferrão, J. P. Souzalin, C. Alvares, and M. Boyer. With his acting abilities, Conceição's contributions to various tiatrs resulted in success and acclaim. As his career progressed, Conceição faced increasing pressures within the industry, which may have impacted him over time. Despite experiencing health-related challenges and receiving advice to abstain from performing, his love for the tiatr compelled him to remain connected to the art form. His final memorable role materialized in John Claro's Purtugez Kolvont (Portuguese Artist), a portrayal characterized by such realism and naturalness that it left audiences astonished, blurring the boundaries between reality and the theatrical realm. In addition to his acting career, Conceição ventured into playwriting and directing, contributing approximately ten tiatrs to the theatrical repertoire. Popular works among his repertoire include Birmôt, Piddeacho Khuris, and Gottalo, which enjoyed popularity and critical acclaim. Moreover, Conceição showcased his musical abilities by composing and performing around twenty songs, further diversifying his artistic contributions. Throughout his career, which spanned over three decades, Conceição participated in over a hundred tiatr performances, both in productions of his own and in collaboration with others.

== Personal life ==
On 15 October 1958, Conceição married Maria Gracinda Viegas, a homemaker from the town of Curtorim at Mormugão Church. On 16 July 1986, aged 58, Conceição died at his residence in Vasco da Gama, Goa.

== Selected stage works ==
Year	Title	Role	Notes	Ref
1953	Untitled tiatr	Actor/singer	Professional debut	
1953	Mauxi Vo Paichi Bail	Singer		
1953	Camil Bottler	Actor/singer		
1954	Jurament	Unnamed role		
1954	Birmôt	Writer/director	Debut as writer; restaged in 1957 in Goa	
1963	Lokak Lagon	Co-director		
	Piddeacho Khuris	Director		
	Gottalo	Director		
1958	Doiea	Actor		
1960s	Divors	Actor		
1980	Purtugez Kolvont	Actor	Final production	
