= Italian Bhurgo =

1892 Konkani play by Lucasinho Ribeiro

- Original language: Konkani
- Written by: Lucasinho Ribeiro
- Based on: Italian Boy by Gonzalez Brothers
- Characters: Nine unnamed characters wearing velvet costumes
- Genre: Tiatr, opera

Premiere
- Date: 17 April 1892
- Place: New Alfred Theatre, Bombay, British India
- Directed by: Lucasinho Ribeiro

Italian Bhurgo (transl. Italian Boy) is a Konkani play written and directed by Lucasinho Ribeiro. The play premiered on Easter Sunday, 17 April 1892, at the New Alfred Theatre (now Police Commissioner's head office) in Bombay, British India. It was the first Konkani play or teatro (tiatr) ever staged. Ribeiro's first play was staged with the assistance of fellow Goans Caitaninho Fernandes, Agostinho Mascarenhas, João Agostinho Fernandes, and Fransquino Fernandes, collectively known as the Goa Portuguese Dramatic Company. The play was based on an Italian operetta by the Gonzalez Brothers.

== Production history ==
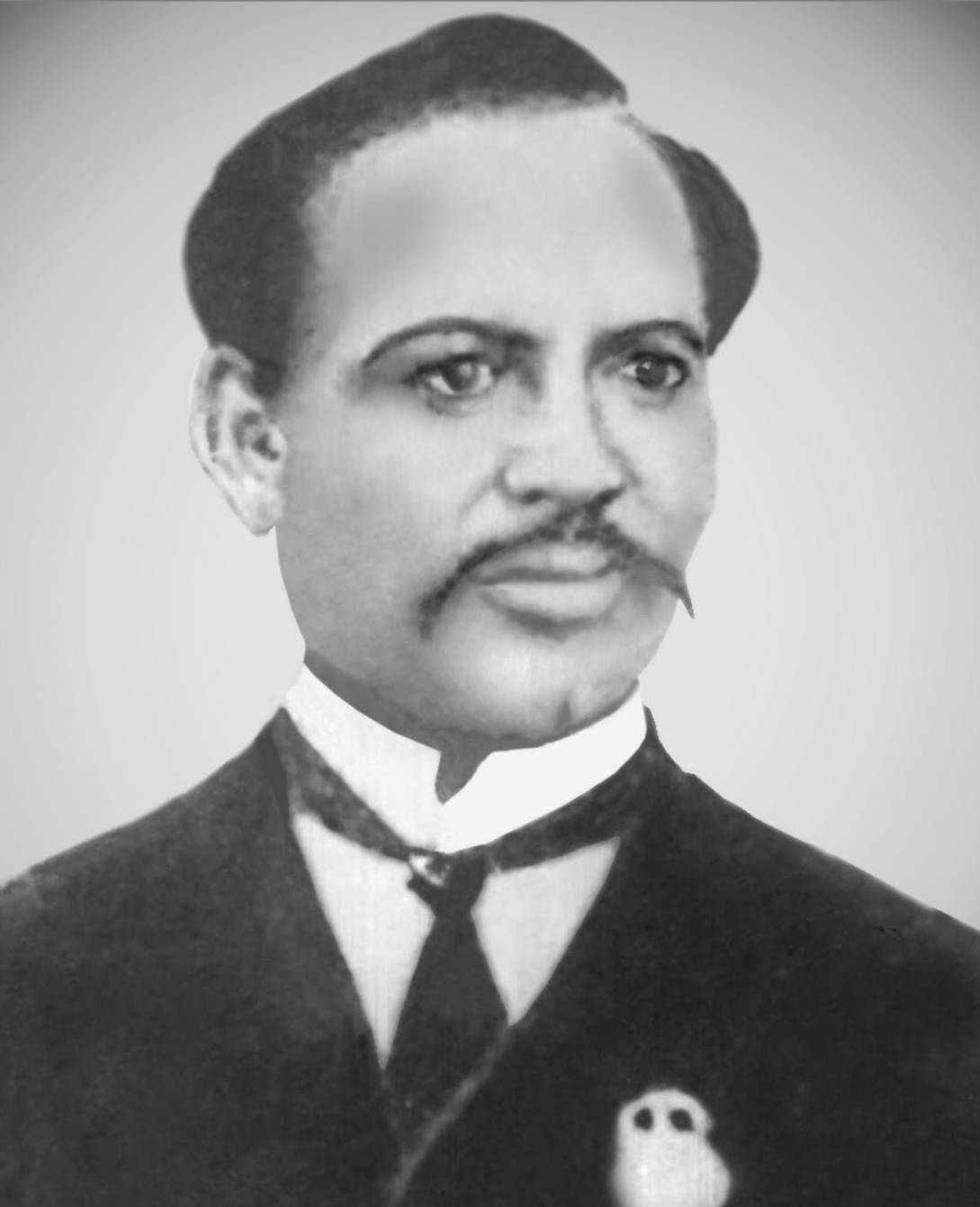
Ribeiro during his youth

Lucasinho Ribeiro was a Goan immigrant who resided in Bombay (now Mumbai) during the late 19th or early 20th century. He exhibited a high level of proficiency in the English language, showcased musical prowess by excelling in violin performance, and gained recognition for his abilities as both a composer and singer. His journeys ultimately brought him to work as a stagehand for an Italian opera troupe touring Bombay during that period. In this capacity, he accompanied the troupe to various locations across British India. Ultimately, he decided to leave the opera company, but not before being exposed to and influenced by one of their operettas, likely composed by the Gonzalez Brothers. Utilizing the knowledge and experience he gained through his work with the Italian opera company, Ribeiro went on to adapt one of their operettas into his own original Konkani play or teatro, titled Italian Bhurgo (Italian Boy). When departing the opera company, he had the foresight to purchase some of their velvet costumes, which he subsequently incorporated into the staging of his Italian Bhurgo production.

According to the analysis of Goa University professor André Rafael Fernandes, the inception of Italian Bhurgo by Ribeiro was not a haphazard creative decision; instead, it was influenced by his past interactions and engagement with the Italian opera troupe. Conversely, some writers have argued that Ribeiro's play was in fact an adaptation of an existing English opera known as Italian Boy, rather than an entirely original work. His first theatrical production, which he titled Italian Bhurgo, drew inspiration from the Italian operatic tradition, incorporating elements of that form into the nascent Konkani dramatic genre. As the driving force behind this pioneering Konkani play, he assumed a leadership role among his collaborators, who recognized his experience in theatrical production. Following his departure from employment in Bombay, Ribeiro joined forces with Caitaninho Fernandes of Taleigão in the quest for actors to take part in a play. Despite their best efforts, they faced obstacles in attracting young men to participate in the production. The aspiring actors exhibited skepticism towards Ribeiro's novel theatrical approach, likening it to the established Goan folk drama form known as zagor. This comparison posed a substantial barrier, ultimately resulting in Ribeiro's decision to forego the staging of the production.

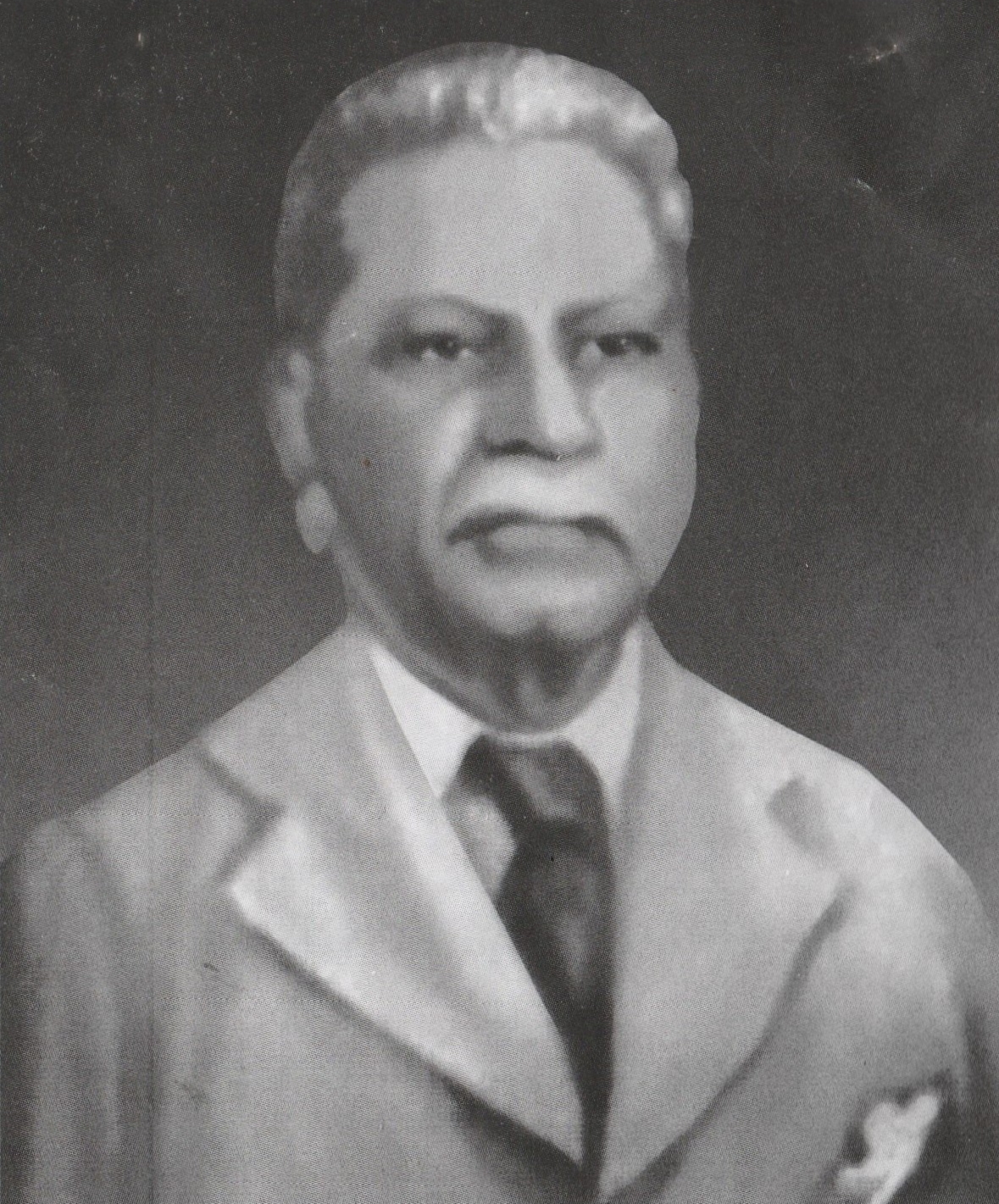
João Agostinho Fernandes, better known as Pai Tiatrist, during his middle age from the 20th-century

In the late 19th century, a group of individuals in the city of Bombay (now known as Mumbai) came together to establish the foundations of the Konkani theatrical tradition known as tiatr. It began with a chance encounter between Caitaninho, an employee of the Bombay Gazette, and João Agostinho Fernandes. The two men discussed the teatro (theater) genre, prompting João to accompany Caitaninho to meet Ribeiro at his residence on Picket Road in Bombay on a Sunday. Following this initial introduction, João would regularly visit Ribeiro in the evenings after his workday had concluded. A group consisting of Caitaninho, João, and Ribeiro embarked on a quest to discover youthful talents to engage in the theatrical presentation of Italian Bhurgo. Their search led them to local clubs where they identified and recruited Agostinho Mascarenhas and Fransquino Fernandes for the production. To stage the opera or theater production effectively, a total of nine performers were essential. Each performer assumed the responsibility of portraying multiple roles, typically handling 2-3 characters. The group dedicated their evenings after work to rehearse and prepare for the upcoming production. Impressed by their dedication, Ribeiro took it upon himself to formally establish the foundations of Konkani tiatr in February 1892. He did so near the Rodond Bungalow on Picket Road in Bombay, that had five actors (his associates), including himself, portraying a total of nine characters.

In the late 19th century, the Konkani-speaking community residing in Bombay faced a void in their entertainment options. This issue was recognized by João Agostinho Fernandes, a popular figure within the community, who sought to address the problem. Fernandes provided encouragement to his mentor, Ribeiro, who was feeling discouraged, to move forward with the preparations for the first-ever Konkani teatro, also known as a Konkani theater production. He was cognizant of the need to provide a suitable alternative to the undesirable zagors, a local form of entertainment, for the Konkani-speaking population in Bombay. He believed that the establishment of a Konkani theater could spark a revolution in the entertainment landscape experienced by the Goan community in the city. The initial endeavors to materialize this vision were impeded by various challenges, particularly the task of securing a suitable quantity of actors for the theatrical production. However, the efforts of Fernandes and Ribeiro eventually led to the successful launch of their pioneering venture. The infrastructure in Bombay, characterized by its expansive and comfortable theaters and opera halls, offered a conducive setting that facilitated their pursuits. The engagement of Goan emigrants in Bombay's music industry not only ensured a steady influx of musicians but also highlighted the contributions of Goans trained in Goa's Escola de Musica (music schools) to the city's musical landscape during that era.

== Characters ==
The play features a cast of nine unnamed characters, where the five actors demonstrate their versatility by embodying multiple roles, with each actor taking on two to three different characters throughout the play. The actors involved were Lucasinho Ribeiro, Caitaninho Fernandes, Agostinho Mascarenhas, João Agostinho Fernandes, and Fransquino Fernandes. While some published accounts and writings do not explicitly state that Ribeiro participated as an actor, his involvement is confirmed and implied through writings by João Agostinho that were published in the 28 November 1943 issue of the Roman Konkani weekly newspaper Ave Maria. The characters in the play wore secondhand velvet costumes that had previously been utilized by an Italian opera company where Ribeiro had previously worked.

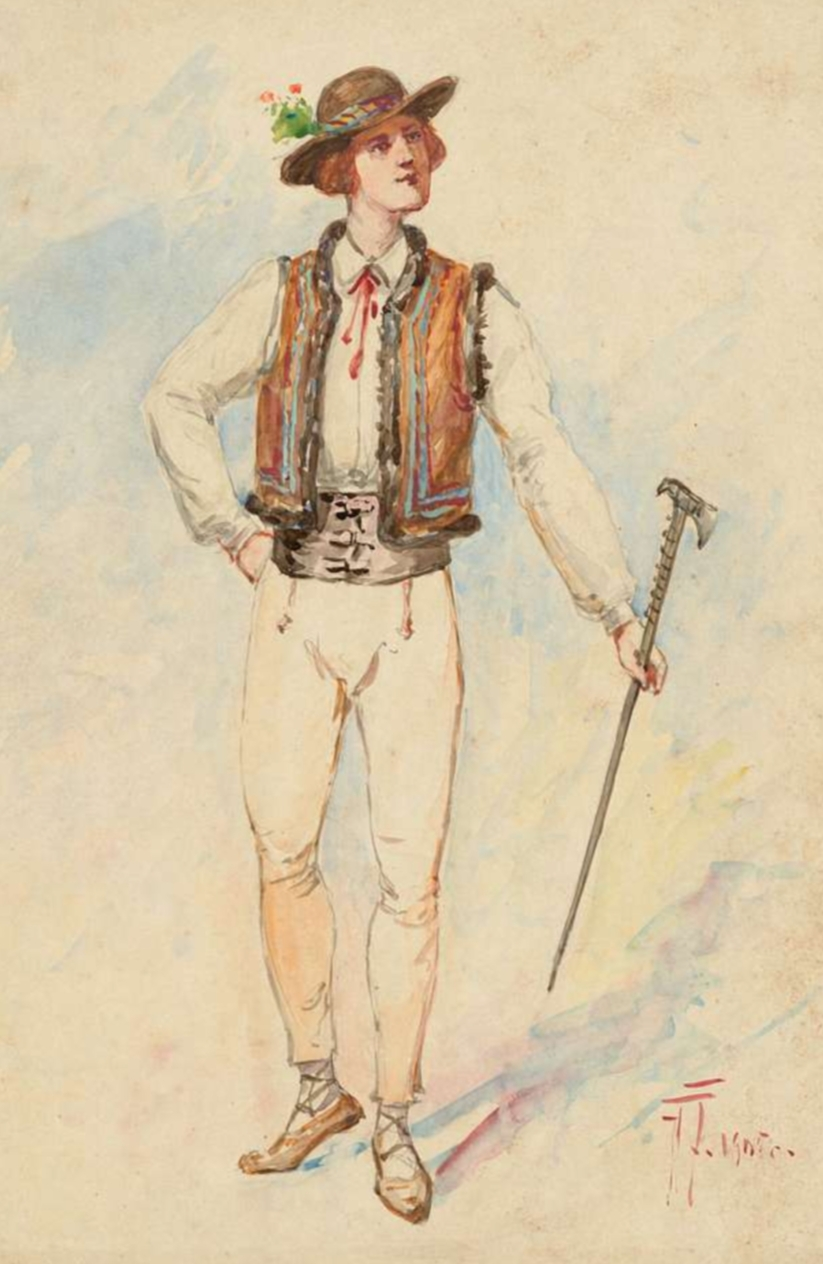
A young male costume design from an Italian opera. A similar one was adopted by Ribeiro for his play, but it was made of velvet material.

The production was originally envisioned to feature a full cast of nine actors. In light of difficulties in recruiting a sufficient number of performers, the choice was made to proceed with the production using the existing five actors. This necessity led to the innovative introduction of the concept of individual actors assuming multiple roles, facilitated by changes in costume. During the theatrical production, intermittent pauses were incorporated to facilitate costume changes, while musical performances were seamlessly integrated between scenes in a concert-style format to accommodate this requirement. This new approach to staging a Konkani theatrical production gave rise to the emergence of a new artistic form known as Konkani tiatr.

== Staging ==
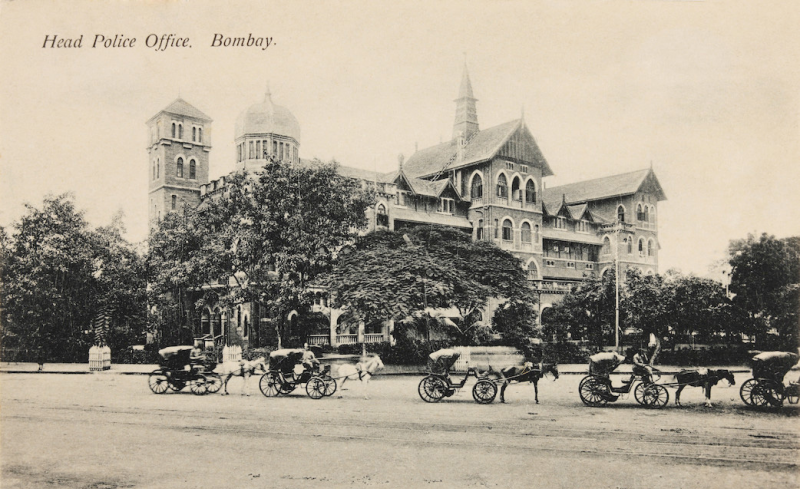
Head Police Office, Bombay in 1905. Prior to the construction and takeover, it housed the New Alfred Theatre.

The play debuted on 27 April 1892 at the New Alfred Theatre in Bombay, British India. This location is currently occupied by the Police Commissioner's headquarters. A sizeable audience attended the premiere performance, which was well received. The spectators were intrigued and impressed by the novel theatrical genre, with a particular emphasis on the operatic elements and diverse musical components it incorporated. Additionally, the audience was struck by the velvet costumes worn by the performers, which had been acquired secondhand from an Italian opera company by Ribeiro. Upon experiencing the plot, musical compositions, stage arrangements, musical performances, choreography, and the opulent velvet costumes showcased in the tiatr, the audience left the show feeling pleased, as noted by historian Wilson Mazarello.
