= John Claro =

Indian writer and director (1930–2024)

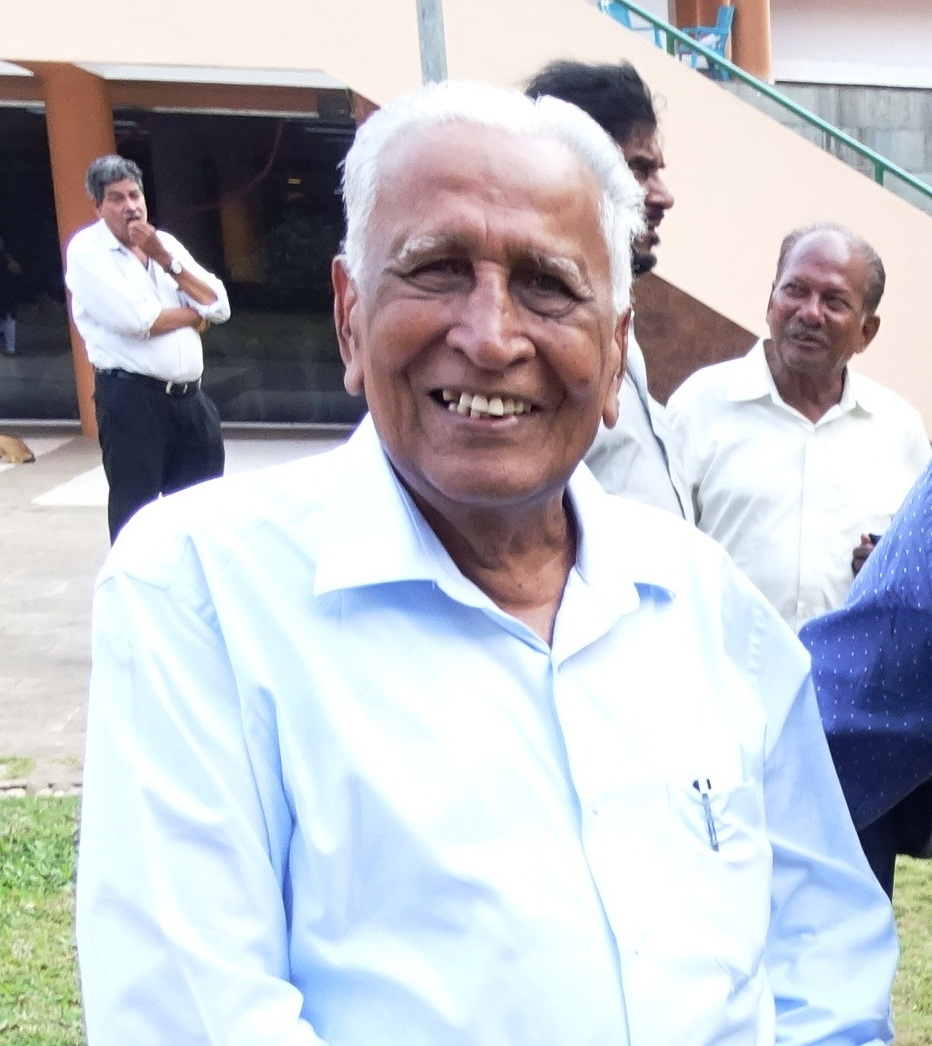
- Fernandes at the Kala Academy, 2015
- Born: Joao Claro Fernandes; 5 December 1930; Quepem, Goa, Portuguese India
- Died: 18 August 2024 (aged 93); Quepem, Goa, India
- Occupations: Writer; theatre director; playwright; actor; consultant
- Years active: 1940s–2005 (theatre)
- Known for: Research on the history of inaugural tiatr production
- Notable work: Portuguez Kolvont
- Spouse: Piedade Afonso (m. 1970)
- Children: 3
- Relatives: Agostinho Fernandes (brother)
- Awards: Sangeet Natak Akademi Award (2023)

John Claro Fernandes (born Joao Claro Fernandes; 5 December 1930 – 18 August 2024) was an Indian writer, theatre director, playwright, and actor known for his work in tiatr productions. Throughout his extensive career, he has made crucial contributions to the development and advancement of Goan tiatr. His noted research on the history of tiatr led to the discovery that the inaugural tiatr production, titled Italian Bhurgo, took place on 17 April 1892, at the New Alfred Theatre in Bombay (now Mumbai), presently occupied by the Police Commissioner headquarters.

== Early life ==
Fernandes was born as Joao Claro Fernandes on 5 December 1930, in Cotombi, Quepem, Goa, which was part of Portuguese India during the Portuguese Empire (now part of India). He was the son of Jose Custodio Fernandes and Epifania Rebello, and had a younger brother named Agostinho, who was a writer and cardiologist based in Portugal until his death on 28 June 2015, aged 82.

During his school years, Fernandes developed a deep appreciation for theater and local art, actively engaging in annual social gatherings. After completing his primary education, he embarked on his professional acting career in Roque Afonso's tiatr production, Eke Oklek Teg Novre (One Bride Three Bridegrooms). He played the role of one of the bridegrooms, alongside Kamat de Assolna and Saluzinho, while Lucas Fernandes assumed the character of the bride. Fernandes's path intersected with that of M. Boyer, as both resided in close proximity in Maddel Pequem, Margao. Due to a scarcity of educational institutions in Goa at the time, Fernandes relocated to Bombay to pursue further education and employment opportunities.

== Career ==
On 25 December 1953, Fernandes made his debut as a playwright with his first tiatr production titled Camil Bottler. Simultaneously, he stepped into the role of a professional actor for the first time. Directed by A. R. Souza Ferrão, the play featured cast including Master Vaz, C. Alvares, Effie Fernandes, Andrew, Anthony De Sa, Anthony Mendes, and other popular artists from Bombay. The initial staging took place at Princess Theatre, Bhangwadi in Kalbadevi, a popular venue that served as a testing ground for tiatrists (tiatr performers) in Bombay. The audience's favorable response led to subsequent performances. Due to the play's success, it was later staged at Cowasji Jehangir Hall to support a specific church section. Valerian Gracias, the first cardinal of Mumbai, attended one of these performances.

Fernandes continued to contribute to the tiatr tradition with his subsequent play, Rinnkari Zanvoi, which also found success in Bombay. Throughout his career, Fernandes had written and staged a total of 15 tiatrs. Some of his works included Nirmiloli Sun, Gupit Karann (Secret Reason), Ghorabeachi Durdoxea, Utrachi Mudi, Portugez Kolvont (Portuguese Artist), 23 Vorsam (23 Years), Konkani Advogad (Konkani Advocate), Inglez Madam (English Madam), Tambddi Mati (Red Soil), Rostadak Ostad, Vinglli Nachpinn (Naked Dancer), Civil Kazar (Civil Marriage), and American Dollar.

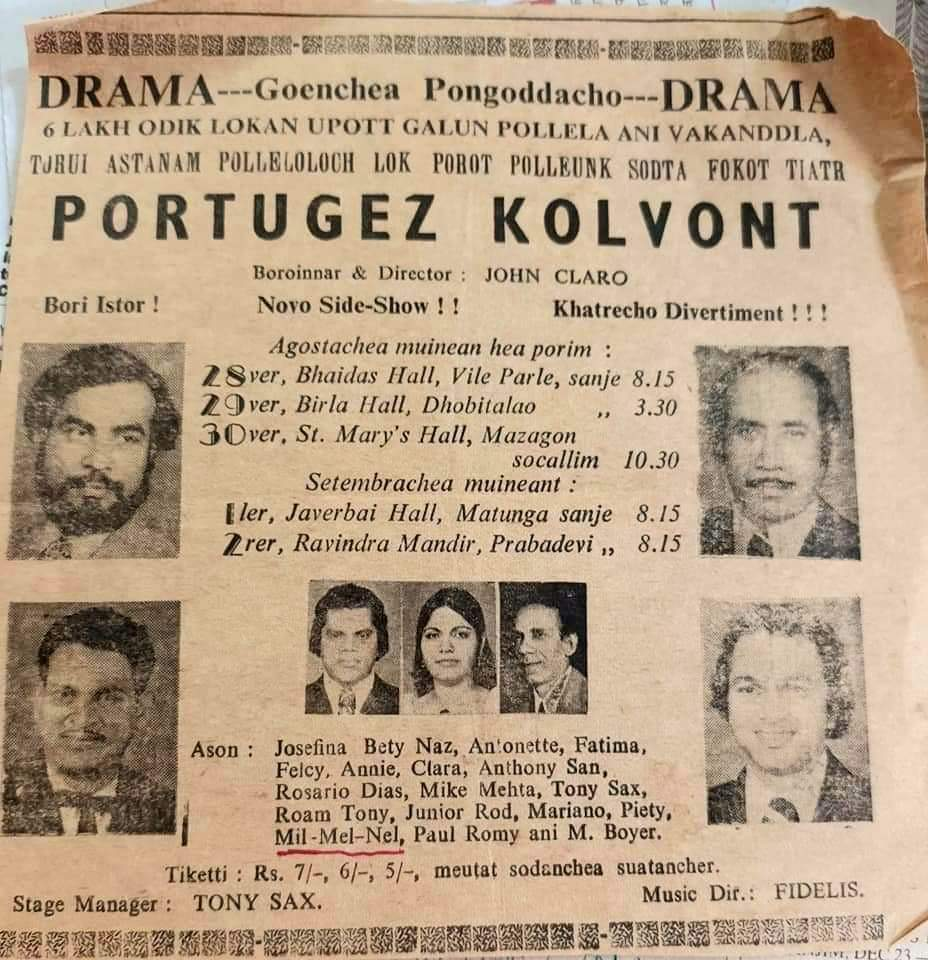
Handbill of the tiatr Portugez Kolvont

After his return to Goa from Bombay following the liberation, Fernandes embarked on his second tiatr production, titled Rinnkari Zanvoi, catering to the local tiatr enthusiasts. While his first tiatr, Camil Bottler, was also staged in Goa, its run was limited to just two shows due to A. R. Souza Ferrão's leading role. However, Fernandes achieved acclaim among tiatr aficionados with his production Portugez Kolvont (1979), which swiftly reached the milestone of one hundred performances. This tiatr also found success outside of Goa, completing a double century of shows. The limited availability of auditoriums during that era posed challenges for staging tiatrs on a regular basis, a fact acknowledged by Fernandes himself.

The success story of Portugez Kolvont can be traced back to its origins. Fernandes shared that the script for this play was conceived in Portugal, inspired by a fado performance he witnessed in Algarve, a tourist hub. The tiatr commenced with a fado piece and featured a plethora of entertainment, with a particular focus on comedy. The comedic elements were crafted specifically for Paul Romy, while the main role was tailored with Ophelia Cabral in mind, although her participation did not materialize. Instead, Sabina Fernandes, despite appearing slightly mature for the role, delivered a creditable performance.

Fernandes concluded his career in tiatrs with his final production, titled American Dollar around 2005. Throughout his journey, he remembered the support he received from Antonio Fernandes, the late proprietor of Herald Publications, and later from Antonio's son, Raul Fernandes. Even if it meant making late-night trips to the office, they always cooperated in publishing tiatr advertisements. Fernandes's contributions extended beyond tiatr, as he established himself as a prolific writer whose works appeared in publications such as Goa Times, Sot Uloi, Goan Express, New Goa, Goycho Avaz, Gulab, The Goan Review, The Navhind Times, O Heraldo, and Gomantak Times.

When reflecting on the evolution of tiatr from his era to the present, Fernandes expressed his concern that today's productions lack vision, often resorting to imitation of films and television serials. In stark contrast, the tiatrs of his time were driven purely by a love for the stage and the art form, with little regard for financial considerations. Fernandes emphasized that the comedy in contemporary tiatrs tends to be vulgar, a far cry from the sophisticated humor exhibited by prominent figures such as Kid Boxer, Anthony Mendes, and Jacinto Vaz. He credits Minguel Rod's ability to understand and cater to the audience's preferences as a key factor in his successful career.

In addition to his accomplishments in the field of tiatr, Fernandes displayed his literary prowess by penning a novel called Norsicho Mog, six years after Goa's liberation. This work revolved around the story of a mother and was published by Prabhakar Tendulkar. Fernandes's acclaimed tiatr production, Portugez Kolvont (1979), had also been immortalized in printed form. As of 2015, following a decade-long hiatus from tiatrs, Fernandes had transitioned to running 'Claro Consultancy' in Margao. His consultancy specialized in English/Portuguese translations. Fernandes's sons, Godfrey and Godwin, actively participated in the documentation of Portuguese passports, making it a familial endeavor.

== Personal life ==
Fernandes married Piedade Afonso, a homemaker from his village of Cotombi, Quepem, on 4 January 1970. The couple had two sons, Godwin and Godfrey, and a daughter, Golda.

== Death ==
On 18 August 2024, Fernandes died at his residence in Quepem, Goa, at the age of 93.

== Awards and recognition ==
In 1992–93, Fernandes was bestowed with the esteemed "Goa State Cultural Award" in the field of tiatr, presented by the Directorate of Art and Culture of the Government of Goa. In December 2011, the Tiatr Academy of Goa bestowed upon Fernandes the "Lifetime Contribution to Tiatr Awards", an achievement in acknowledgment of his outstanding dedication and invaluable contributions to the field. The ceremony took place at Ravindra Bhavan in Margao.

In April 2012, Fernandes was honored for his substantial contributions to Goan tiatr during a felicitation organized by the Maharashtra Konkani Kala Sanstha in Mumbai, with support from the Tiatr Academy of Goa. In December 2017, Fernandes was bestowed with the "Dalgado Cultural Award" by the Culture and Art Minister at the time, Govind Gaude. In July 2020, Fernandes was honored with the "GULAB Tiatrist of the Year 2019" award further attesting to his achievements and his contributions to the Tiatr community. In February 2021, Fernandes was presented with the "Gulab Tiatrist of the Year Puraskar" on Konkani Journalism Day.

In December 2022, Fernandes received a felicitation at the Tiatr Academy of Goa's Lifetime Contribution Awards ceremony. In February 2023, the Dalgado Konknni Akademi felicitated Fernandes at Ravindra Bhavan in Margao, showcasing his status as a recipient of the "Dalgado Sonskurtik Puraskar". In September 2023, Fernandes was honored with the one-time Sangeet Natak Akademi Award for playwrighting. He was the sole artist from Goa and one among the 75 artists selected across India by the national academy of music, dance, and drama.

== Selected stage works ==
Year	Title	Role	Notes	Ref
1940s	Eke Oklek Teg Novre	Bridegroom	Debut tiatr	
1953	Camil Bottler	Actor/writer	Debut as playwright	
1954	Rinnkari Zanvoim	Writer		
1972	Gupit Karann	Writer/director		
1979	Portuguez Kolvont	Writer		
1981	23 Vorsam	Writer		
c. 1993	Rostadak Ostad	Writer/director		
	Nirmiloli Sun	Writer/director		
	Ghorabeachi Durdoxea	Writer/director		
	Utrachi Mudi	Writer/director		
	Konkani Advogad	Writer/director		
	Inglez Madam	Writer/director		
	Tambddi Mati	Writer/director		
	Vinglli Nachpinn	Writer/director		
	Civil Kazar	Writer/director		
c. 2005	American Dollar	Writer/director	Final production	

== Select bibliography ==
- Dias, Tom John; Claro, John (1967). "Norsicho Mog". Advogad: romans (Novel). Bombay, India: Jack of All Stall. OCLC 16313402.
- Claro, John (1996). "23 Vorsam". In Felício Cardoso (ed.). Tiatrancho Jhelo I. Panaji, Goa, India: Goa Konkani Akademi.
- Fernandes, John Claro (2006). Purtugez kolvont: tiatr. Panaji, Goa, India: Goa Konkani Akademi. OCLC 141478752.
