= Aristides Dias =

Indian playwright and singer (1928–1991)

- Portrait of Dias during his later years
- Born: Aristides Gauncar; 30 March 1928; Raia, Goa, Portuguese India, Portuguese Empire (now in India)
- Died: 6 August 1991 (aged 63); Goa, India
- Occupations: Playwright; singer; composer; actor
- Years active: 1940–1991
- Spouse: Margarida Cardoso (m. 1958)

Aristides Dias (né Gauncar; 30 March 1928 – 6 August 1991) was an Indian playwright, singer, composer, and actor known for his work in Konkani films and tiatr productions.

== Early life ==
Aristides Dias, originally known as Aristides Gauncar, was born on 30 March 1928, in Arlem, Raia, Goa, which was a part of Portuguese India during the era of the Portuguese Empire. He was born into a Goan Catholic family, with his parents being Antonio Gauncar (later known as Antonio Joaquim Gaunkar e Dias), who was also involved in directing tiatrs, the traditional Konkani stage plays, and mother Ana Rita Fernandes. Dias had a younger brother named Luciano, who was also involved in the Konkani stage as a singer. After completing his initial education at a local village school, Dias pursued further studies and obtained his Segundo Grau (equivalent to high school) in Portuguese in Manora, Raia. During this time, he developed an interest in singing and acting in Konkani theater, although he also demonstrated a natural aptitude for painting and was known for his artistic abilities and distinctive calligraphic handwriting. Despite his talents in various artistic pursuits, Dias' primary passion remained in the realm of singing and acting.

== Career ==
During his early years, Dias showcased his talent as a singer at the age of 12 in Roque Antonio Borges' tiatr production, held in Nuvem. His portrayal of a young girl was praised, resulting in an encore for his performance. Recognizing his potential, Jephsis Hitler and C. A. Gomes extended regular invitations for Dias to join their troupes and participate in their tiatr performances. These opportunities allowed Dias to work on his acting and singing skills. Dias demonstrated skill in portraying female roles on the Konkani stage. A turning point in his career occurred when A. R. Souza Ferrão, a known figure in the tiatr community, witnessed Dias's performance and lauded his talent, offering words of encouragement. This endorsement from Souza Ferrão provided Dias a boost. In 1945, at the age of 17, Dias authored his first tiatr, Visvas (Trust), which he staged in his hometown. This marked the beginning of his journey as a tiatr playwright. Dias's breakthrough on the professional stage came in 1948 when he produced three consecutive tiatrs: Kuttumb (Family), Sot Bhavarth (True Faith), and Liplolo Ghutt (Hidden Secret). The works connected with audiences because they depicted real-life events and experiences that were relatable.

Dias achieved success with his second play, Kuttumb, which marked his entry into the commercial tiatr scene and garnered positive reception among tiatr enthusiasts. Encouraged by this achievement, Dias made the decision to extend his artistic horizons. He resigned from his position at Chowgule Industries in Vasco da Gama, Goa, and devoted himself to tiatr, writing and staging a series of productions under the banner of Young Stars of Goa. Later, he also composed a series of tiatrs, including Doea (Pity), Divors (Divorce), Dispott'tto, Doulot (Wealth), Koidi, Dev Nit, Rudon, and others. Dias was known for his writing style, characterized by the incorporation of strong moral themes, comprehensible dialogues, and melodies for the cants. One of his theatrical works, Doea (1958), brought him into the limelight as it enjoyed more than 100 performances and achieved commercial success. Consequently, Dias gained recognition as one of the leading tiatr playwrights of his time during this period. He maintained an active involvement with the Young Stars of Goa group, regularly producing tiatrs under their banner. On 5 October 1980, Divors was another tiatr by Dias, which became the first production in the genre to reach 100 shows and achieved box office success. The anticipation for Dias' tiatrs among Bombay audiences was palpable, often resulting in sold-out tickets well in advance of the group's arrival.

Writer Michael Gracias writes, "Dias's songs had a simple yet catchy melody, lyrics of high standard and perfect rhymes." Many of his compositions, such as "Azilan Vetam," "Murteo," and "Renetichea Dongrar," became popular songs in Goan households. He collaborated with figures in the Konkani stage, such as Jacinto Vaz, M. Boyer, Conception, Nelson, Luis Rod, Minguel Rod, Aleixinho De Candolim, Remmie Colaço, and Edward Almeida. Over the course of his career, Dias wrote and directed approximately 15 tiatrs, with Divors, Doea, and Doulot standing out as his most popular works. His compositions spanned a wide range, encompassing solos, duets, and duos. Dias often performed his songs in a distinctive style, frequently sharing the stage with his brother, Luciano Dias. He actively participated in more than 500 tiatrs, both in his own productions and in collaborations with others. Additionally, Dias demonstrated his acting abilities in the Konkani film Mhoji Ghorkarn. As a tiatrist, he embarked on tours across various locations, including Goa, Bombay, and East Africa.

== Personal life ==
In February 1958, Dias married the homemaker Margarida Cardoso, who originally hailed from Rachol, Goa. The couple reportedly had at least (Note: They might have had more children since some Portuguese-era birth records had been destroyed.) three sons together: Custodio (b. 1959), Raimundo (b. 1960), and Sales (b. 1963). At the time of his marriage, Dias's profession was a impregado comercial (commercial employee). Dias was characterized by his benevolence and philanthropy. He spent time to educating disadvantaged students within his community.

=== Petromax incident ===
During a tiatr production by Alfred Rose titled Dotor Advogad (Doctor Advocate) in Raia, Goa, a significant change took place as the performance shifted from a traditional wooden stage to a modern metal stage. As electricity was not available during that time, the stage lighting relied on petromax lamps. An incident occurred during the show when one of the petromax lamps exploded, causing burns to troupe member Rico Rod. Dias displayed resourcefulness by intervening and using his shirt to extinguish the flames, effectively preventing further harm.

== Death ==
On 6 August 1991, Dias died in Goa at the age of 63. Before his passing, he had created a song dedicated to Rajiv Gandhi, who was the Prime Minister of India at the time, although he was unable to perform it himself. Additionally, he was in the process of working on a new script titled Dilolem Utor (Given Promise).
