= Isidore Dantas =

Indian writer and translator (born 1947)

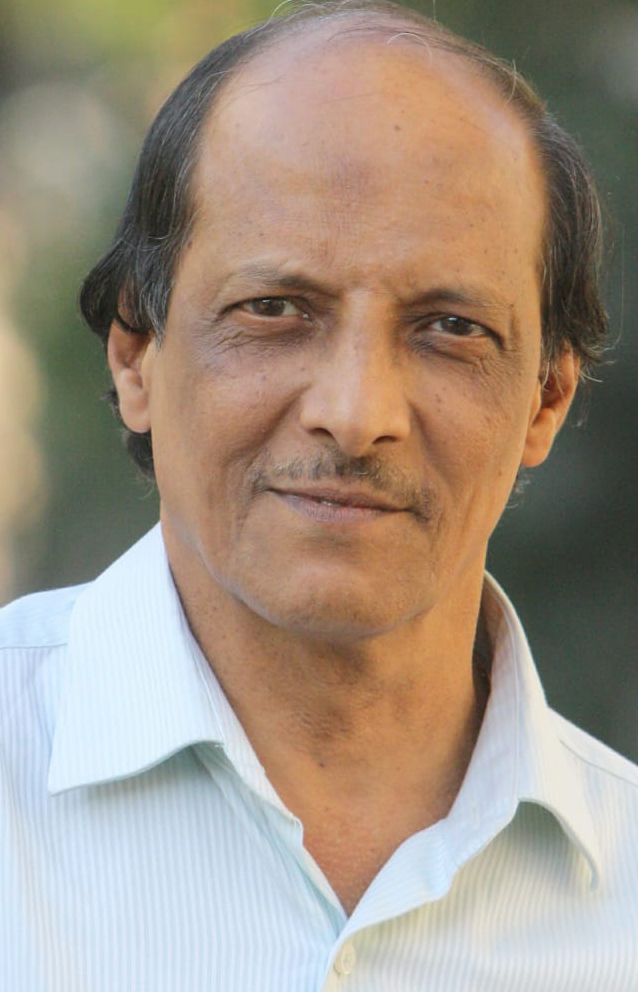
- Dantas in 2018
- Born: 4 April 1947 (age 79); Poona, Bombay Presidency, British India (now Pune, Maharashtra, India)
- Education: University of Poona; Brihan Maharashtra College of Commerce; Nowrosjee Wadia College; Guardian Angle High School, Curchorem
- Occupations: Lexicographer; writer; translator; Wikipedia editor; former bank officer
- Children: 3
- Writing career
- Language: Konkani; English; Marathi
- Years active: 1958–present
- Period: In Pune from 1961.
- Genres: Lexicography, non-fiction
- Subjects: Konkani film, translations
- Notable awards: Maharashtra Konkani Kala Sanstha, Mumbai, 2012 Lifetime Achievement Award. 125 Years of Tiatr Felicitation, 2017. Dalgado Konkani Akademi Journalism Award 2010, Goan Cultural Centre, Kuwait, honoured in 2010.

Isidore Dantas (born 4 April 1947) is an Indian writer, translator, Wikipedia editor, and lexicographer known for his work in the Konkani language and Konkani Wikipedia. Noted for his interest in Konkani films, he is best known for his book on Konkani cinema Konkani Cholchitram and for having co-authored an English-to-Konkani dictionary. He has authored five books, co-authored a dictionary, and translated two books.

== Biography ==
Dantas is a retired bank officer, having worked as an Assistant General Manager of the State Bank of India, at the Opera House Branch in Mumbai (Bombay). He traces his roots to the Bardez village of Saligao, while his family was based in the Curchorem area in interior Goa, where his grandfather was a regidor (village official in Portuguese times). He is married and has three children.

== Works ==
Unusually, Dantas writes in both the Romi (Roman) and Devanagari scripts of Konkani, and also in Marathi.

=== Konkani dictionary ===
Dantas co-authored, with the late Joel D'Souza, a Konkani dictionary titled English-Konkani Dictionary in 2016. In January 2016, he shared the 365-page dictionary under a Creative Commons license. In 2016 it was made available in full-text on Wikimedia Commons.

=== Books ===
Apart from his co-authored dictionary, Dantas had, as of 2018, published eight books. Others were at that time reported as being in the pipeline.

Dantas' 2010 book on Konkani cinema, Konkani Cholchitram ("Konkani films"), has been released in the Roman script, Devanagari script and Kannada script versions of Konkani. It lists and describes all the films ever shot in that language from the first in the 1950s or thereabouts till very recently.

He has written books on Konkani sayings and proverbs, one of which is entitled Ozran.

His Utor-Sod is a Konkani vocabulary quiz book. He has also translated two books: children's author Anita Pinto's Espi Mai Is Stuck Again (as Espi Mai Porot Xirkoli) and artist-writer Angela Ferrao's Fuloos Plays With the Sun (as Fuloosachi Husharkai).

=== Other works ===
He has contributed widely to the Konkani periodicals and newspapers and as of 2018 wrote a column for a Marathi newspaper in Goa. He plans to write a book on the famous Goan musician Alfred Rose and another on the history of Goan newspapers and periodicals. He is also active in contributing translations to Konkani Wikipedia.

== Role in restoring Konkani film ==
Dantas has been described as an "avid collector of Konkani film memorabilia" and is credited with having had a role in the restoration part of the first (and popular) Konkani film Mogacho Aunddo (Love's Craving) (1950), by Al Jerry Braganza. The restoration was undertaken by L'Immagine Ritrovata, a restoration laboratory in Bologna. Media reports said the reels of the film were handed over by a relative of Braganza (his nephew, Angelo Braganza) to Dantas in 2010 during the release in one of his books, and Dantas, in turn, passed it on to prominent Konkani film director Bardroy Barretto, who managed to get the job done.
