= Lewis M. Ratus =

Indian actor and screenwriter

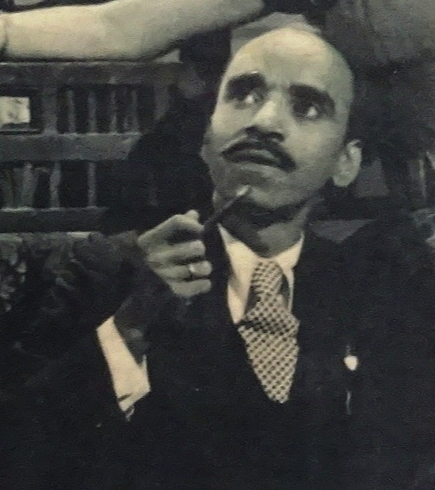
- Ratus in Mogacho Aunddo, 1950
- Born: Bombay, Bombay Presidency, British India (now Mumbai, Maharashtra, India)
- Died: Bandra, Bombay, India (most likely)
- Other names: Luis. M. Ratus
- Occupations: Actor; screenwriter; playwright; teacher
- Years active: 1950–1963
- Known for: Mogacho Aunddo; Amchem Noxib

Lewis M. Ratus (fl. 1950–1963) was an Indian actor, screenwriter, playwright, story writer, ghostwriter, and teacher. He was among the first Konkani actors, alongside Al Jerry Braganza, Leena Fernandes, and Alfred Almeida, who appeared in the inaugural Konkani film Mogacho Aunddo (1950).

== Career ==
Ratus was a relatively obscure individual about whom limited information is available in literary works. According to Wilson Mazarello, a writer and historian, who documented the history of Konkani tiatro in his book 100 Years of Konkani Tiatro (2000), Ratus was involved in the Konkani film industry and also worked as an English teacher in Bombay, British India (now Mumbai, Maharashtra). However, Ratus primarily gained recognition as a writer of Konkani plays, tiatros or tiatrs (a popular form of Goan musical theater), and stories. Ratus authored several tiatros, however, his works were often performed and claimed by various theater directors as their own, effectively functioning as a ghostwriter. The extent of Ratus' involvement in the Konkani film industry is that he made his debut on the silver screen in the movie Mogacho Aunddo (transl. Love's Craving) in 1950. In this film, Ratus portrayed a supporting character alongside actors such as Irene Amaral, Elizabeth D'Abreo, Mary D'Souza, Jacob Fernandes, Joyce Fernandes, and Romeo Paul Pires. Ratus also made contributions to the soundtrack of Mogacho Aunddo, lending his vocals to popular hits like "Mogacho Aundo" (Khorench to chodd khor Mogacho Aunddo, konnank zaina sor Mogacho Aunddo). Collaborating with Leena Fernandes, James Braganza, Irene Amaral, and Jacob Fernandes, Ratus showcased his musical abilities. Writer Andrew Viegas, in an article for the publication Goa World, commended the performances delivered by Ratus and James Braganza in the film Mogacho Aunddo.

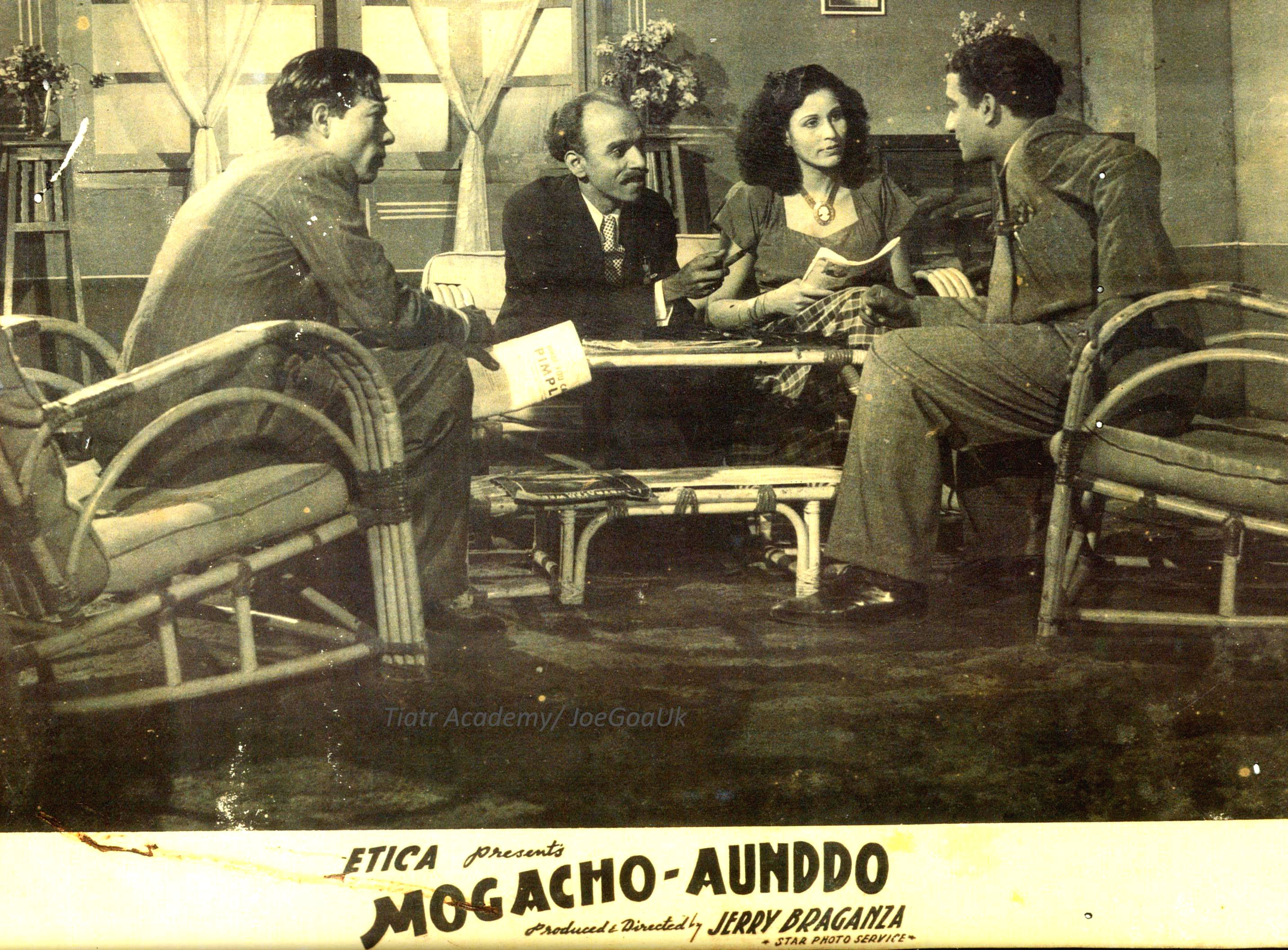
A shot taken from the film, from right to left: Al Jerry Braganza, Leena Fernandes, and Ratus (in the middle).

Mogacho Aunddo is a cinematic adaptation based on the book Mogachi Vodd by Dioguinho D'Mello. The film was created and directed by Al Jerry Braganza, with production under the ETICA Pictures banner, which stands for Exchange Talkies of India, China, and Africa. In addition to its premiere in Goa, Mogacho Aunddo was screened at venues in Bombay, including Rivoli (Matunga), Liberty (Fort area), and Star (Mazgaon). Notably, the movie was filmed in Goa during the era of Portuguese rule and saw its release on 24 April 1950, making it the sole production originating from Portuguese India. Wilson Mazarello, a writer, sheds light on the background of Ratus, the scriptwriter for Mogacho Aunddo. Mazarello reveals that Ratus primarily pursued a career as an English teacher in Bombay and participated in the Konkani film and theater industry as a secondary pursuit. Ratus, alongside other Konkani tiatro writers, refrained from fully embracing the Konkani stage as a professional occupation due to their commitments in other fields. Their contributions to the domain of Konkani tiatro are of importance which is comparable to leading tiatrists of their era, as highlighted by Mazarello's writings and inclusion of Ratus among the only twelve Konkani tiatro writers in the publication 100 Years of Konkani Tiatro, released in 2000. Ratus attained recognition in Konkani literature with his screenplay for the film Amchem Noxib (transl. Our Luck) in 1963, which garnered multiple accolades. The film was created by filmmaker Frank Fernand through his production company, Frank Films (Goa), and it featured actors C. Alvares and Anthony Mendes in leading roles. Amchem Noxib marked the first Konkani film to receive several awards and was released thirteen years after the pioneering Konkani production, Mogacho Aunddo (1950).

== Personal life ==
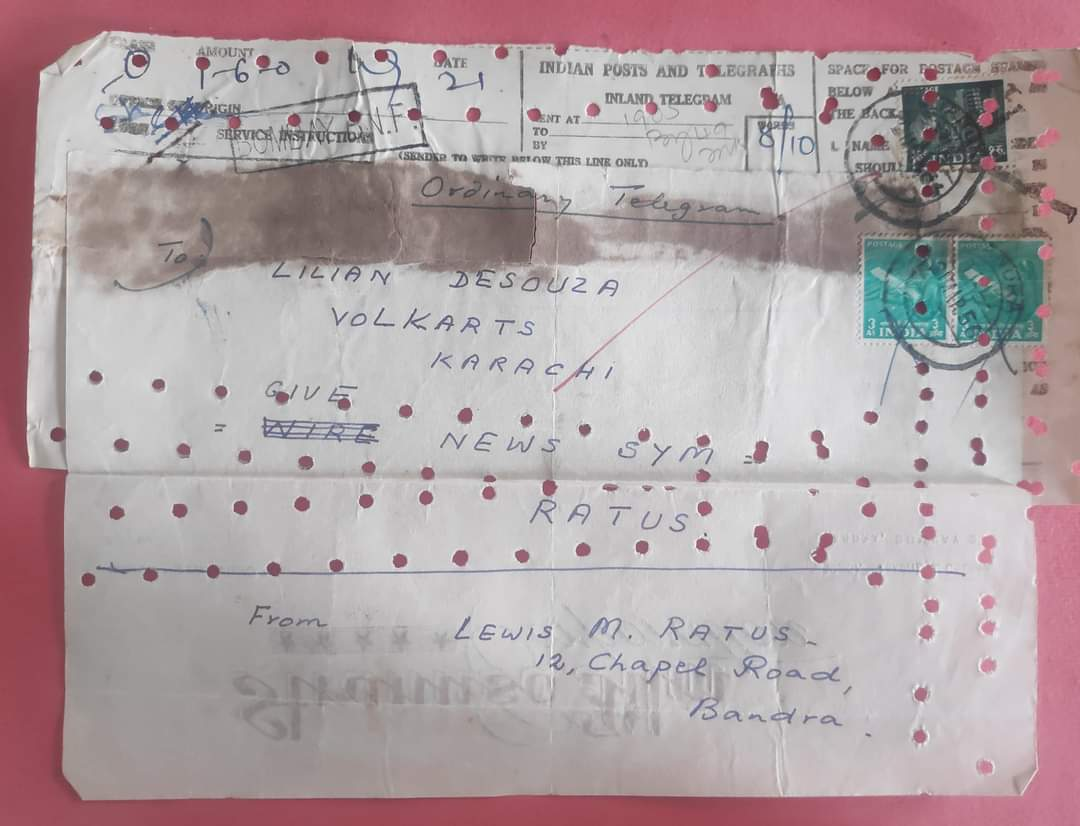
The telegram sent by Ratus to Lilian.

Ratus is a figure of limited biographical information, with little available knowledge about his personal and early life. A source shedding some light on his background is the book 100 Years of Konkani Tiatro authored by writer and historian Wilson Mazarello in 2000. Mazarello suggests that Ratus was actively engaged as an English teacher in Bombay (now Mumbai), a fact attesting to his involvement in the field of education. In recognition of his contributions, Mazarello refers to him as "Prof. Luis M. Ratus", underscoring his professional standing. Additional insights into Ratus's life can be gleaned from an original telegram he sent to Lilian De Souza of Karachi on 21 March 1956, revealing his residence at 12, Chapel Road, Bandra in Bombay, Maharashtra.

== Filmography ==
Year	Title	Role	Notes	Ref
1950	Mogacho Aunddo	Supporting role	Professional debut	
1963	Amchem Noxib	Screenwriter		
