= Master Vaz =

Indian singer and lyricist (1927–2019)

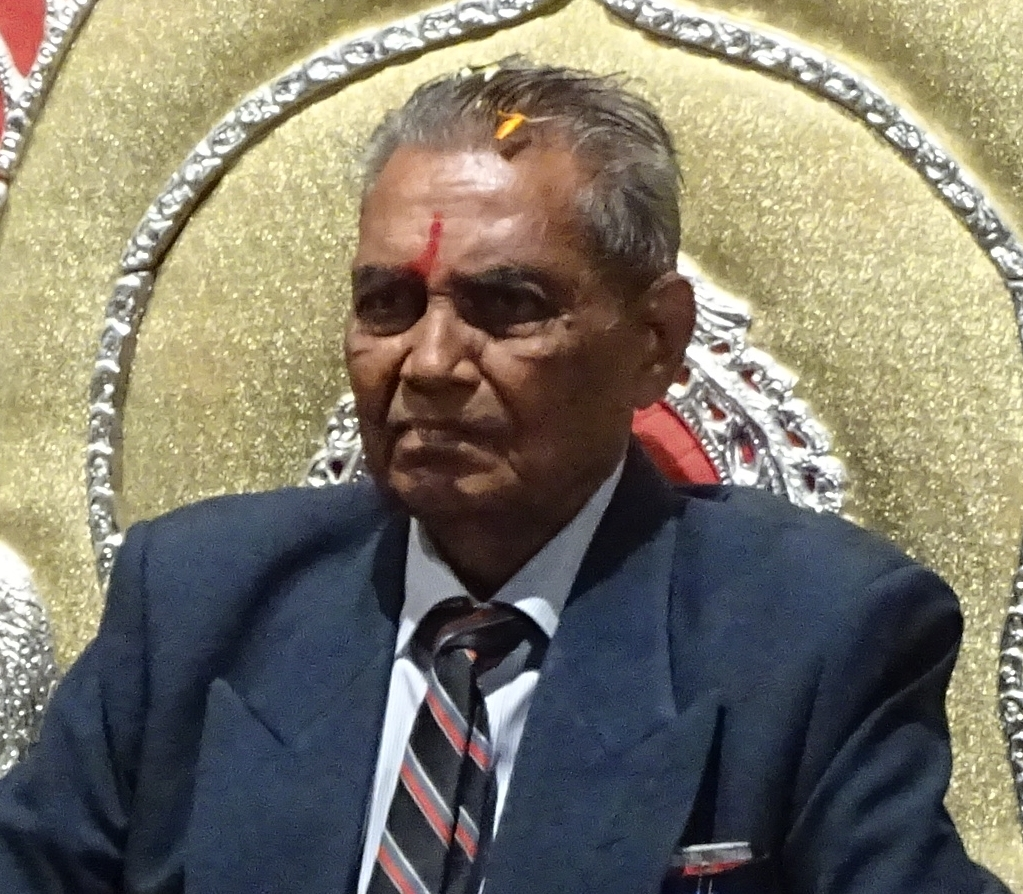
- Vaz at Ravindra Bhavan, Margao in 2016
- Born: José Lourenço Vás; 6 September 1927; Mapuçá, Goa, Portuguese India, Portuguese Empire (now in India)
- Died: 13 December 2019 (aged 92); Utorda, Goa, India
- Occupations: Singer; playwright; lyricist
- Years active: 1934–c. 2004
- Notable work: Mogacho Anvddo; Amchem Noxib
- Spouse: Marianin Vaz
- Children: 9, including Marcus

Jose Lawrence Vaz (born José Lourenço Vás; 6 September 1927 – 13 December 2019), known professionally as Master Vaz, was an Indian singer, playwright, and lyricist known for his work in Konkani films, tiatr productions, folk plays, and radio plays.

== Early life ==
Jose Lawrence Vaz, originally named José Lourenço Vás, was born on 6 September 1927, in Mapuça, Goa, which was under Portuguese rule as part of Portuguese India (now in India). His father, Benjamin Vaz (né Vas), a tailor, hailed from Aldona, and his mother, Maria Aurora Vaz (née Rodrigues), was a homemaker. They belonged to a Goan Catholic family and had an elder daughter named Josephine, who was a Konkani singer. Both of Vaz's parents were tiatrists (tiatr performers), known for their unique theatrical abilities, and they often performed in tiatrs across Bombay (now Mumbai).

== Career ==
In 1934, the tiatrist Saluzin from Bardez made the strategic decision to bring his theatrical production, titled Bomboichi Ixttinn (Bombay Friend), to the city of Bombay. In this production, Vaz's parents assumed the roles of Mr. and Mrs. Vaz within the said drama. At the age of 7, young Vaz, the protagonist's character, was introduced by the director as Master Vaz, a name that resonated and became his enduring stage name within the Konkani theater landscape. During this period, Vaz collaborated with individuals such as Pako, Ernest Rebello, and Saluzin, collectively creating a repertoire of melodious compositions that Vaz performed with nostalgia. Additionally, Vaz's elder sister, Josephine, possessing a vocal prowess, joined her brother in rendering duets for approximately two years. Furthermore, Vaz's brother-in-law, Sebastian D'Souza, known by the moniker SD Punewala, contributed significantly by composing songs for Vaz's performances. Vaz initiated his foray into scriptwriting at the age of 12, debuting his first comedic tiatr, Jack and Mack, Tarvar Zalem Pack, at the St. Martin's Hall in Bandra. Although the production deviated from a conventional tiatr format, presenting itself as more of a concert, it received appreciation and acclaim from the discerning audience. Subsequently, Vaz continued to enrich the theatrical landscape with his creative output, successfully staging two additional tiatrs, namely Addecho Dotor (The Orthopedic) and Enddeanchem Noxib (Fool's Luck).

The arrival of the Konkani singer Minguel Rod and his tiatr in Bombay heralded a significant milestone for Vaz's career. Welcomed into Rod's troupe, Vaz diligently engaged in rigorous rehearsals alongside fellow artist Kid Boxer, often concluding their creative endeavors with a shared convivial moment at Mahim. Notably, Paulo Marcel Pereira, hailing from the town of Goa Velha, contributed to the propagation of Minguel Rod's theatrical works, presenting the tiatrs Ghorchem Kestanv (Family Feud) and Bapul Bhav (Cousin Brother) in Goa subsequent to their successful staging in Bombay. During this period, Vaz and the entire troupe found solace and accommodation within the hospitality of Paulo's abode in Goa Velha. Encouraged by their predecessors' achievements, contractors from Verna, Goa and Cansaulim, namely Caetan Bev/Kontu and Sakratis/Paru, respectively, sought to emulate their success by staging Minguel Rod's celebrated tiatrs in numerous villages, predominantly in Verna and Cansaulim. This trend continued as Vaz and his troupe members spent the months between November and January in Goa, captivating local audiences with their tiatr performances while residing at Minguel Rod's residence in Cortalim. The culmination of their Goan sojourn coincided with the feast of Three Kings on 3 January, wherein they performed their final presentation in Cansaulim before returning to the city of Bombay.

During his tenure with Minguel Rod's troupe, Vaz acquired expertise in songwriting, singing, and scriptwriting for tiatrs. He had the privilege of being cast in tiatrs produced by pioneers of the Konkani stage, including Saib Rocha, Dioguinho D'Mello, Kid Boxer, Minguel Rod, Young Menezes, Prem Kumar, C. Alvares, J. P. Souzalin, Aleixinho de Candolim, and others. Vaz's son, Marcus Vaz, a Konkani singer, organized a performance of his tiatr Almachea Disa in Kuwait and invited Vaz to join the cast, alongside Prince Jacob, Antonette De Calangute, and Marcelin de Betim. Throughout his career, Vaz has written and directed approximately 25 tiatrs, with contributions including Bapui (Father), Mhalgoddo Put Fulgoddo, and Ghoracho Divo (The Light of the House). In addition to performing in Goa, Vaz showcased his tiatrs in various locations such as Pune, Malwan, Vengurla, Sawantwadi, Belgaum, New Delhi, and Daman and Diu. He also expanded his artistic endeavors internationally, presenting his performances in Karachi, Mombasa, Nairobi, Nakuru, and Kampala. Vaz's creative talents extended to the realm of film, where he composed the lyrics for the opening song of the first Konkani film, Mogacho Anvddo (1950), as well as a song in the Konkani film Mhoji Ghorkarn. As a prolific lyricist, he composed and performed thousands of songs, many of which enjoyed popularity. Furthermore, Vaz showcased his versatility by writing and presenting numerous folk plays on All India Radio, Panaji. Some examples of his radio plays include Visvaxi Ghorkarn (Loyal Wife), Vizmit, and Ganvchi Seva (Village Service).

== Style and reception ==
The Times of India writes, Vaz's career was characterized by his portrayal of female roles, a task that was deemed unconventional for women at the time. He exhibited impressive proficiency in his body language and mannerisms, surpassing the abilities of even the most accomplished contemporary female performers. Vaz's performances were flawlessly executed, often deceiving audiences into believing that they were witnessing an actual woman on stage. Furthermore, he showcased his vocal talents by singing the female parts in duets alongside esteemed figures in the Konkani theater realm. The Times of India further acknowledges Vaz's personal attributes. He consistently displayed a benevolent nature, readily extending assistance to emerging tiatr artists. Moreover, he fulfilled his roles as a husband and father, and his guidance and companionship proved invaluable to present-day tiatrists.

== Select filmography ==
| Year | Title | Role | Notes | Ref |
|---|---|---|---|---|
| 1950 | Mogacho Anvddo | Lyricist | Theme music only | |
| 1963 | Amchem Noxib | Actor | | |
| 1969 | Mhoji Ghorkarn | Lyricist | one song | |

== Selected works ==
=== Tiatrs ===
| Year | Title | Role | Notes | Ref |
|---|---|---|---|---|
| 1934 | Bomboichi Ixttinn | Child artiste | Debut tiatr | |
| 1939 | Jack and Mack, Tarvar Zalem Pack | Writer | Debut as writer | |
| | Addecho Dotor | Writer | | |
| | Enddeanchem Noxib | Writer | | |
| | Ghorchem Kestanv | | | |
| | Bapul Bhav | | | |
| 1960s | Bapui | Writer | | |
| | Mhalgoddo Put Fulgoddo | Writer | | |
| | Ghoracho Divo | Writer | | |
| 2004 | Almachea Disa | | | |

=== Radio plays ===
| Year | Title | Role | Notes | Ref |
|---|---|---|---|---|
| | Visvaxi Ghorkarn | Writer | | |
| | Vizmit | Writer | | |
| | Ganvchi Seva | Writer | | |
