= Suryaji Sadashiv Mahatme =

Goan writer (1837–1899)

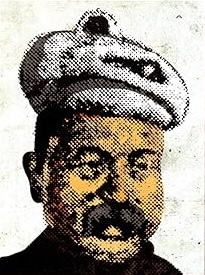
- Born: 1837; Panaji, Portuguese Goa
- Died: 13 December 1899 (aged 61–62); Bandra Hill Road, Bombay
- Writing career
- Language: Marathi

Suryaji Sadashiv Mahatme (1837 – 13 December 1899) was a Marathi novelist from Goa.

== Early life and education ==
Suryaji Sadashiv Mahatme was born in 1837 in Panaji, Portuguese Goa. His primary education in the Marathi language took place at his home in Panaji. He later pursued formal education, completing the Segundo Grau (second grade) and studying at the Liceu de Goa for three years. He was proficient in multiple languages, holding knowledge of Marathi, Portuguese, French, and Sanskrit.

== Career ==
Mahatme moved to Bombay, where he was employed at the solicitor firm Crawford, Crown & Company.

In 1870, he established a monthly magazine titled Anandalahari. In 1871, he published his first book, Europkakuchya Shaletil Maramari, which was a translation of The Fight at Dame Europa's School, an entertaining book based on the Franco-German war.

His second book, Tantuvadya Kinva Satar Shiknyache Pustak, was published in 1872. In 1886, he published his third book, Veshdhari Punjabi. This work was an independent, social, and mystery novel, regarded as an important early work in the Marathi mystery fiction genre. His fourth book, Vikramacharitra, was published in 1888. Later, in 1891, he compiled and edited both Veshdhari Punjabi and Vikramacharitra into a two-part edition.

Mahatme was also responsible for publishing twenty-four volumes of the periodicals Yatharthadipika and Vamani Granth through the firm Balaji and Company. His contributions to Vamani Granth are considered a significant work of his later life.

== Death ==
Mahatme died on 13 December 1899 at Bandra Hill Road in Bombay.
