= Lawrence de Tiracol =

Indian singer and lyricist (1943–2016)

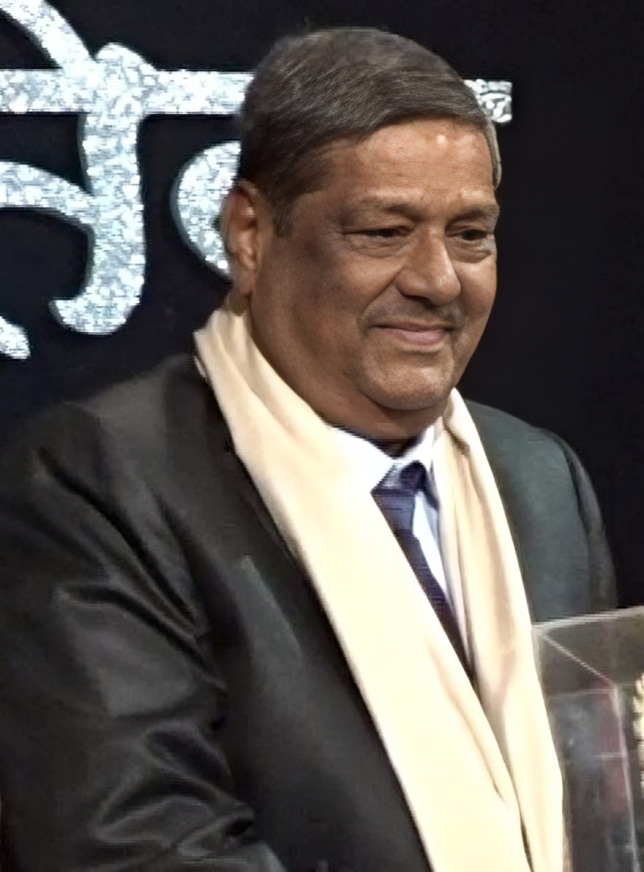
- Fernandes at Institute Menezes Braganza, 2015
- Born: Lourenco Alexinho Fernandes; 17 July 1943; Bombay, British India
- Died: 26 April 2016 (aged 72); Tiracol, Goa, India
- Burial place: St. Anthony's Church cemetery, Tiracol, Goa, India
- Other name: Larry
- Education: St. Sebastian Goan High School
- Occupations: Singer; director; playwright; engineer
- Years active: 1950s–2012
- Employer: Otis Worldwide
- Spouse: Conception Fernandes
- Children: 3

Lourenco Alexinho Fernandes (17 July 1943 – 26 April 2016), popularly known as Lawrence de Tiracol or Larry, was an Indian singer, lyricist, theatre director, playwright, and engineer who worked on the Konkani stage.

== Early life ==
Lourenco Alexinho Fernandes was born on 17 July 1943, in Bombay, British India. Raised in the Goan settlement of Dabul, Fernandes received his education at St. Sebastian Goan High School. Like many Goans, he was introduced to tiatrs at an early age and developed a deep passion for the art form. After completing his engineering studies, Fernandes embarked on a successful career with Otis Worldwide, a multinational corporation specializing in the manufacturing of elevators and escalators. His professional responsibilities eventually led him to the Middle East, where he was entrusted with overseeing Otis's business interests in various countries, including Iran, Saudi Arabia, Dubai, and others. For a period of 18 years, Fernandes dedicated himself to his work in the Middle East, gradually distancing himself from the Konkani stage and focusing on his corporate endeavors.

== Career ==
Fernandes made his debut in the Konkani stage at a young age of 12–14. He was introduced to the stage by Francis de Parra in the tiatr production titled Sotchem Bhirad. Throughout his career, Fernandes had the privilege of sharing the stage with tiatr personalities such as Kid Boxer, C. Alvares, Francis de Parra, Rico Rod, Star of Arossim, Seby Coutinho, Souza Ferrao, Remmie Colaco, and Anthony Mendes, among others. Notably, his collaboration with Jessie Dias in Bombay led to numerous memorable duets performed live on stage.

During his time in Bombay, Fernandes actively participated in the Konkani music scene. He engaged in acting and singing in various tiatrs, contributing to the vibrant cultural landscape. However, it was his work behind the scenes that truly made an impact. From 1994 to 2012, Fernandes produced a total of 44 high-profile Konkani music albums, showcasing his talent to the art form. While away from his hometown of Bombay and Goa, Fernandes continued his creative pursuits by writing song lyrics and compiling them. Upon his return to Bombay in 1994, after completing an assignment in the Gulf, he took the opportunity to produce his first audio cassette O Daina under the label of Tips Industries. This initial success was followed by another album titled Bhangarache Tandul released by His Master's Voice later that same year.

Fernandes played a pivotal role in the revival of Lorna, a singer in the Konkani music industry, after a lengthy hiatus of 27 years. During his time in Bombay, Fernandes collaborated closely with Ronnie Monserrate. Through their efforts, they successfully convinced Lorna to make a comeback, leading to the release of the acclaimed album Hello Lorna in 1994. Fernandes contributed significantly to this album by writing the majority of its songs, except for the special song "Aikat Mhozo Tavo", which was composed by Gabru Gomes of Mumbai specifically for Lorna's return. Interestingly, Fernandes and Gomes did not have a personal meeting during the assignment.

Fernandes's contributions to the Konkani music industry extended far beyond his collaborations with Lorna. He is known as a versatile artist, having recorded over 48 albums on cassettes and CDs, with 22 albums featuring Lorna. His extensive repertoire includes more than 500 original songs, and he has worked with several music companies throughout his career. Additionally, Fernandes showcased his talent as a scriptwriter, having written scripts for three tiatrs titled Sonstin Sanddlolo, Dukhacho Daag (The scar of pain), and Konnak Mhunnom Maim (Whom do I call Mother?).

== Death ==
On 26 April 2016, Fernandes died following a battle with renal failure. His demise was met with condolences from the Tiatr Academy of Goa, which expressed sincere sympathy to his bereaved family. Four days later, a funeral service was conducted at St. Anthony's Church in Tiracol to honor his memory.

=== Reactions ===
Konkani actress Jessie Dias, who had directed Fernandes's acclaimed tiatr production titled Konnak Mhunnon Maim (Whom do I call Mother?), fondly remembered him as a skilled lyricist with a captivating voice. Their respective journeys in the tiatr industry began around the same time, and Dias had the privilege of sharing the stage with Fernandes for the first time in her brother Lucas Cardozo's tiatr production, Eksuro (Alone).

== Legacy ==
On 23 May 2016, the Tiatr Academy of Goa (TAG) arranged a commemorative event at the Black Box in Ravindra Bhavan, Margao, to honor Fernandes. The occasion served as a platform for attendees to pay tribute to Fernandes and reflect on his contributions. Jessie Dias, speaking at the event, highlighted their joint performance in the tiatr Eksuro that propelled them to fame. As a token of remembrance for her childhood friend Fernandes, Dias performed a portion of the song they had sung together. Fernandes, affectionately known as the "Elvis Presley" of Mumbai due to his distinctive singing style, was remembered by those present.

Joaquim Barbosa, a devoted admirer of Fernandes, praised him as an extraordinary composer, while Alvaro Gomes emphasized Fernandes's instrumental role in Lorna Cordeiro]'s resurgence following her self-imposed exile of 25 years. Lorna, Fernandes's daughter, expressed her appreciation to TAG for organizing the special condolence gathering.

In 2016, during the Thirteenth Session of the 6th Goa Assembly, a tribute was paid to Fernandes through an obituary reference. The motion was initiated by Anant Shet, the Speaker of the Goa Legislative Assembly.

== Selected stage works ==
Year	Title	Role	Notes	Ref
1955	Sotchem Bhirad	Child artiste	Professional debut	
1955	Eksuro	Singer		
	Sonstin Sanddlolo	Writer		
	Dukhacho Daag	Writer		
	Konnak Mhunnom Maim	Writer		

== Select discography ==
=== Audio albums ===
- O Daina (1994)
- Bhangarache Tandul (1994)
- Hello Lorna (1994)
