= Cyriaco Dias =

Indian actor and singer (born 1937)

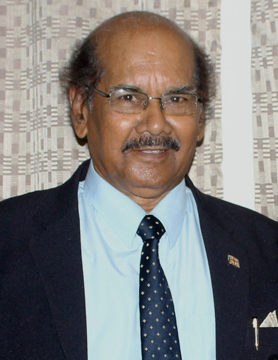
- Dias at Institute Menezes Braganza, 2013
- Born: Santana Filomena Ceirico Camilo Dias; 16 March 1937 (age 88); Raia, Goa, Portuguese India, Portuguese Empire (now in India)
- Other names: Shembu Canconkar; Ciriaco Dias
- Occupations: Actor; playwright; theatre director; singer; freedom fighter; social worker
- Years active: 1956–present
- Notable work: Amchem Noxib (1963); Nirmon (1966)
- Movement: Goa liberation
- Relatives: Jessie Dias; Leena Fernandes

Santana Filomena Ceirico Camilo "Cyriaco" Dias (born 16 March 1937) is an Indian actor, playwright, theatre director, singer, freedom fighter, and social worker known for his work in Konkani films and tiatr productions. Throughout his career, he has performed in over 1,000 dramas and has accumulated over 4,500 acting credits.

== Early life ==
Dias was born on 16 March 1937, in Raia, Goa, a region that was under Portuguese rule as part of Portuguese India during the era of the Portuguese Empire. Presently, Raia is located in India. Dias hailed from a musically gifted family, with his father, Pedro Joao Dias (later known as Peter John Menino Dias), being a musician and maestro.

From an early age, Dias actively participated in the struggle for independence and was recognized as a freedom fighter. He joined forces with his associate Jack de Sequeira during the Goa Opinion Poll. During this period, Dias assumed the guise of a Hindu individual named Shembu Canconkar, donning traditional attire such as a dhoti.

== Career ==
Dias embarked on his theatrical career in his youth by joining a cultural club led by Seby Coutinho, Rico Rod, and Vincent Semedo. This association proved instrumental in establishing his reputation, leading to opportunities in C. Alvares' tiatrs, where he excelled in character roles. Dias's talent and popularity expanded, attracting the attention of other directors. He delivered a memorable performance as Jesus Christ in Manuel D'Lima's tiatr Soddvondar.

Dias' debut tiatr, inspired by the Goan freedom struggle, unfortunately remained unproduced. However, he achieved success with his first staged social drama, Zigzigta Titleim Bangar Nhoim (All That Glitters is Not Gold) in 1956, solidifying his position as a rising star. The same year he participated in the productions Kitem Ho Sounsar (What sort of world is this) and Chepekar Cunhado (Hat wearer Brother-in-law). As his career progressed, Dias collaborated with other figures in the Konkani tiatr, assuming diverse roles on the professional stage.

By 2000, Dias had written six original tiatrs, primarily showcased in Bombay (now Mumbai). His creative output expanded further, resulting in a total of twelve tiatrs by 2011. However, Dias's stage appearances became less frequent from 1978 onward due to his professional commitments in Bahrain. Nonetheless, during his tenure in Bahrain, he managed to stage his own tiatrs and sporadically contributed to other theatrical productions. He was recognized for his socially conscious approach.

== Personal life ==
In the year 2000, it was observed that whenever Dias visited Goa from Bahrain during his leave, he would attend tiatrs, which were being performed at that time. Despite his retirement from Bahrain, Dias has maintained his passion for the stage and intends to complete his unfinished work in the Konkani theater. While residing in Manama, Bahrain, he spends his time in Goa with his family at Ambora, Raia.

According to the 2012 Directory of Tiatr Artistes, Dias currently resides in Calangute, located in North Goa. He shares a familial relationship with Konkani actress Leena Dias and Konkani actress and singer Jessie Dias through his connection with Leena.

During his stay in Mumbai, Dias formed a close friendship with Konkani playwright and director Rico Rod. This was evident when Dias spoke about Rod's character during a condolence gathering held at the Black Box in Ravindra Bhavan, Margao, to pay tribute to the late playwright and director.

== Awards and honours ==
Dias has received several awards and felicitations throughout his career. In recognition of his contributions to theatre, he was honored with the "Goa State Cultural Award" for the year 2010–2011. Additionally, he was bestowed with the title of the 2020 "Gulab Tiatrist of the Year". Dias's acting abilities have been acknowledged, as evidenced by his collection of 14 Best Actor awards. Furthermore, his impact on the theatrical landscape earned him the "Life Time Achievement award" from the Tiatr Academy of Goa in 2009.

In addition to his theatrical achievements, Dias has also been honored by various organizations and individuals for his involvement in other endeavors. His contribution as a freedom fighter earned him accolades from the Goa Trinamool Congress and Ramakant Khalap during the Swatantra Senani - Shahid Sanmaan Diwas event, organized by the North Goa District Congress Committee in Mapusa. Furthermore, his role in the Konkani film Amchem Noxib led to a felicitation by former Goa Legislative Assembly speaker Tomazinho Cardozo at the Thomas Stephens Konknni Kendr (TSKK).

Dias's contributions to Konkani culture have not gone unnoticed either. He was felicitated by Dr. Austin D'Souza Prabhu, the editor of the Konkani periodical Veez, at the 3rd International Tiatr Convention. Moreover, the Tiatr Academy of Goa honored him on the momentous occasion of commemorating 125 years of Tiatr at Ravindra Bhavan in Margao. Dias has also received the 2012 "Antonio Pereira Konknni Puroskar" (APKP) from the Thomas Stephens Konknni Kendr.

== Selected stage works ==
Year	Title	Role	Notes	Ref
	Untitled tiatr	Writer	Unproduced	
1956	Zigzigta Titleim Bangar Nhoim	Writer/director	Debut tiatr	
1956	Kitem Ho Sounsar			
1956	Chepekar Cunhado			
