= Jessie Dias =

Indian actress and singer (born 1946)

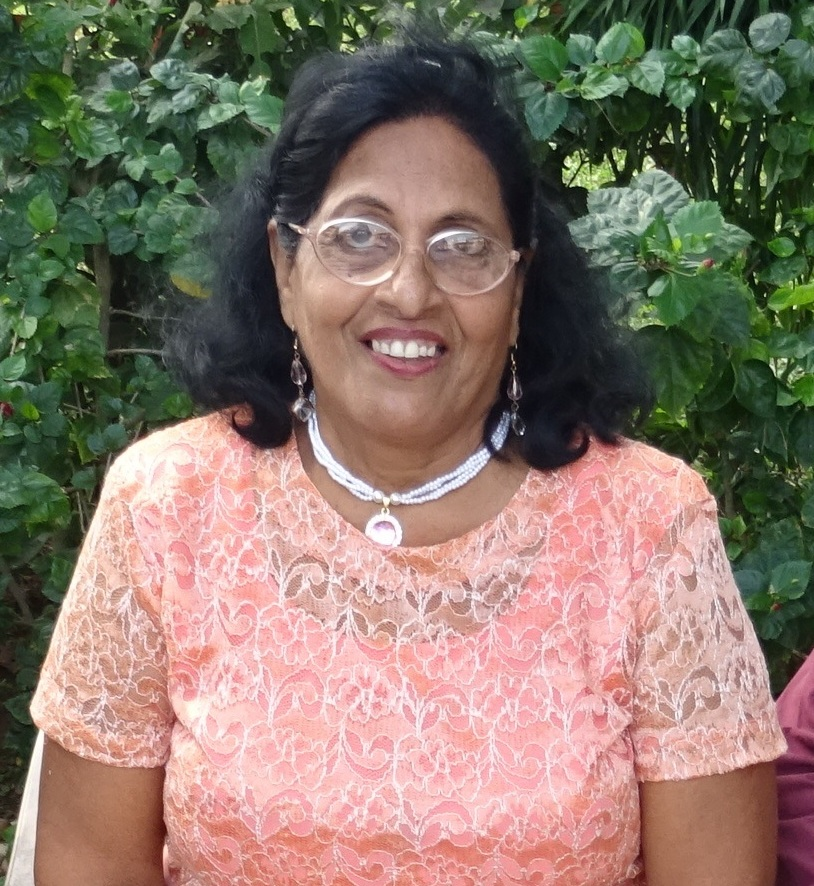
- Dias at the Kala Academy, 2017
- Born: Maria Conceicao Cardozo; 30 May 1946 (age 80); Bombay, Bombay Presidency, British India (now Mumbai, Maharashtra, India)
- Occupations: Actress; singer
- Years active: 1955–1956; 1963–present
- Relatives: Cyriaco Dias; Leena Fernandes

Maria Conceicao Cardozo e Dias (née Cardozo; born 30 May 1946), known professionally as Jessie Dias, is an Indian actress, and singer known for her work in Konkani films, khell tiatr, and tiatr productions.

== Early life ==
Dias, originally named Maria Conceicao Cardozo, was born on 30 May 1946, at JJ Hospital in Bombay which was part of the Bombay Presidency during the time of British India. Her parents, Jose Manuel Cardozo and Robertina Patrocina, raised her alongside two brothers, Bernard and Lucas. Lucas gained recognition as a Konkani playwright. Dias pursued her education at St. Stephen High School in Mumbai, where she cultivated her passion for the performing arts. Tiatr, a form of musical theater, held a special place in her family's heart, particularly her mother's. Dias's connection to the tiatr community deepened through her brother Bernard's friendship with Konkani comedian Anthony Mendes. Through this association, Dias forged meaningful relationships with other tiatrists. Furthermore, Bernard often assisted them in stage arrangements and prompting, lending his support to their performances.

== Career ==
Dias embarked on her journey in the Konkani stage during her childhood, making her debut as a young artist in her brother Lucas Cardozo's tiatr production titled Eksuro (Alone). It was during this time that she caught the attention of Francisco de Parra, a seasoned playwright and lyricist who recognized her potential. At the age of ten, Dias was introduced by de Parra in his tiatr Lagmodi Sun, marking the beginning of her acting career. The turning point in Dias's life arrived in 1963 when she was given the opportunity to substitute for a female artist from Bombay in two dramas, Dotor Advogad (Doctor Advocate) and Director Saib, written by Alfred Rose. These productions were on tour in Goa at the time. Dias's talent in both acting and singing came to the forefront during these performances, impressing not only the Goan audiences but also garnering recognition from esteemed senior artists.

Following this breakthrough, Dias's career gained momentum, as she quickly became a sought-after artist by directors such as M. Boyer, C. Alvares, Remmie Colaco, Jacint Vaz, and Robin Vaz. She specialized in portraying tragic roles and excelled in singing duets, particularly alongside C. Alvares. Dias's vocal prowess extended beyond live performances, as she recorded songs for Gramophone Company India and All India Radio. She also contributed her talents to various audio cassettes and embarked on tiatr tours to several Gulf countries. As of 2000, Dias continues to actively participate in the Konkani stage, frequently appearing in tiatrs and non-stop-shows.

Dias has enjoyed a prolific career in the Konkani theater spanning over five decades, collaborating with more than 90 directors. She has made significant contributions to productions such as Prem Kumar's Kakut Naslolo (Merciless), Konnank Mhunnom Maim (Whom do I call Mother?), and Mortikar (Killer), as well as Minguel Rod's Bapul Bhav (Cousin Brother) and Ghorchem Kestanv (Family Feud), Rico Rod's Paichem Vhoddponn (Father's Pride) and Bailek Lagon (Because of Women), Denis Sequeira's Dogui Mhuje Put (My Two Sons), Alfred Rose's Munis ou Denvchar (Human or Devil), Robin Vaz's Shantichem Login (Shanti's wedding), and C Alvares's Bhattkar de Goa (Landlord of Goa) and Mhuji Vonnim (Through Me). Her participation in khell tiatr productions, including A.M. Pacheco's Fator (Stone), Ligorio Fernandes's Orombh ani Xevott, and Anthony San's Darvontto, has also been noteworthy. However, her most notable collaboration in this genre was with Rosario Rodrigues.

Dias has garnered recognition among tiatr enthusiasts for her duets, not only on the Konkani stage but also in recordings, audio cassettes, and CDs. Throughout her extensive career, she has collaborated with artists such as Lawrence de Tiracol, Francis de Parra, C. Alvares, Bab Peter, Souza Ferrao, Robin Vaz, Greg, and Young Mendes. On stage, Dias has portrayed a wide range of roles, embodying characters as daughters, sisters, mothers, and grandmothers. Amongst these roles, her portrayal of a "Mother" stands out as her forte, showcasing her talent. This nurturing instinct extends beyond her performances, as Dias is known for her genuine care and affection towards her colleagues, regardless of their seniority. Writer Daniel F de Souza lauds her compassionate nature, emphasizing her support, both professionally and personally, as she readily extends a helping hand to those in need.

== Select filmography ==
Year	Title	Role	Notes	Ref
2007	Vadoll	Rosy		

== Selected stage works ==
Year	Title	Role	Notes	Ref
1955	Eksuro	Child artiste	Debut play	
1956	Lagmodi Sun	Actor	Debut tiatr	
1963	Dotor Advogad	Actor	Professional debut; understudy	
1963	Director Saib	Actor	Understudy	
1963	Munis ou Denvchar			
	Kakut Naslolo			
	Konnank Mhunnom Maim			
	Mortikar			
	Bapul Bhau			
	Ghorchem Kestaum			
	Paichem Vhoddponn			
1978	Bailek Lagon			
	Dogui Mhuje Put			
	Shantichem Login			
	Bhattkar de Goa			
	Mhuji Vonnim			
1981	Fator			
	Orombh ani Xevott			
1984	Darvontto			
