= Marcus Vaz =

Indian singer and playwright (born 1956)

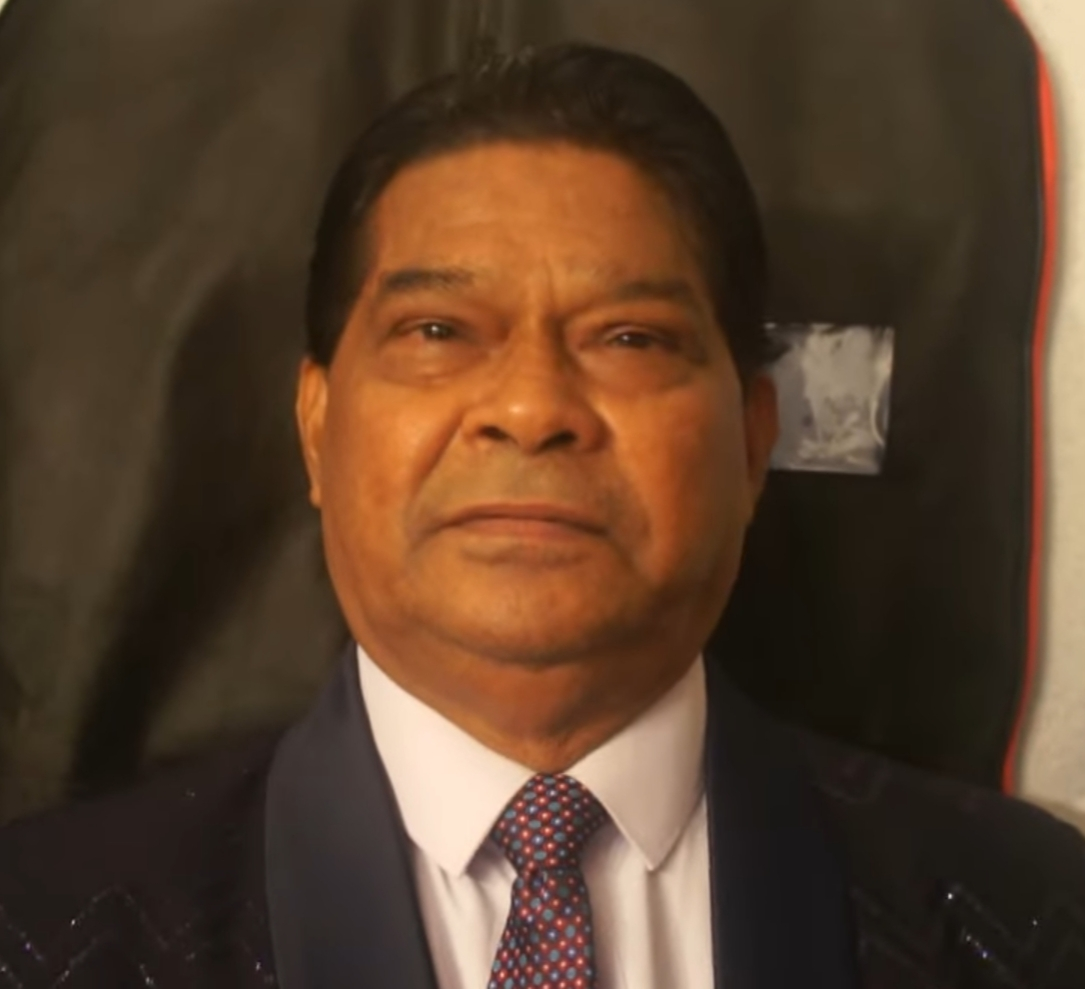
- Vaz at Hanuman Natyagraha, 2023
- Born: John Vaz; 26 April 1956 (age 69); Bandra, Bombay, Bombay State, India
- Occupations: Singer; playwright; director; theatre actor
- Years active: 1967–present
- Spouse: Maria Vaz (m. 1977)
- Children: 2
- Father: Master Vaz
- Website: facebook.com/marcus.vaz.100

John "Marcus" Vaz (born 26 April 1956) is an Indian singer, playwright, theatre director, and actor who works on the Konkani stage.

== Early life ==
His parents were Jose Lawrence Vaz, better known as Master Vaz, a Konkani singer and playwright from Aldonã, Goa, and Marianin Vaz from Utorda, (Goa then being part of Portuguese India during the Portuguese Empire). He grew up with eight siblings, consisting of three sisters and five brothers. Vaz's paternal grandparents, Benjamin and Maria Vaz, were popularly known as Mr. and Mrs. Vaz. Their stage names were derived from the characters they portrayed in a tiatr production. They were active in the tiatr tradition and performed in tiatrs as early as the 1930s in Bombay, British India.

== Career ==
Around the age of 7-8 years, Vaz, along with his sister, would sometimes sing in tiatrs staged in Goa, usually for village performances. Starting his professional career as a child artist, he first sang for C. Alvares in his tiatr Kednam Udetolo To Dis (1967). In this tiatr, his father, Master Vaz, gave him a song "Janta Bombaichi Ghaddi Voita," through which Vaz gained fame. After this initial tiatr, he went on to perform in several more tiatrs. Around the age of 20, Vaz moved to Kuwait where he discovered many professional and popular tiatrists like Xavier Gomes. Vaz only sang songs composed by his father initially, although he didn't sing many of his father's songs. After moving to Kuwait, he began composing his own songs and learned the art of songwriting. Vaz also sang songs written by others. In 1980, Vaz, Xavier Gomes, and Cajetan de Sanvordem formed a trio in Kuwait known as Cajetan-Marcus-Xavier.

Vaz's involvement as a trio member helped him gain fame in Kuwait, where he lived for several years. In 1998, he retired from his job in Kuwait and returned to his home state of Goa. During this period, he had to leave his trio and started singing in tiatrs performed in Goa. Vaz's songs typically revolve around topics that resonate with the public, focusing on positive aspects of various subjects, relevant topics, and current events. He has a unique approach to composing songs; Vaz never sits down to write a song. Instead, he typically composes while driving his motorcycle or car. When he decides on a song topic, he considers a music tune that complements the lyrics. He usually does this while driving, composing verses and choruses until he has three of each for a song. When performing on stage, Vaz typically sings a song that he has in his head rather than the one he has written down on paper.

During his time with the trio Cajetan-Marcus-Xavier, Vaz would compose songs for his fellow trio members Cajetan and Xavier. Much of his compositions would typically remain with his fellow artists like Xavier, as Vaz doesn't usually keep the written work of his songs. While with the trio, Vaz sang approximately 60-70 trio songs. He has remained in touch with his trio even after leaving in 1998 and as of January 2023, he still connects with the trio members and occasionally performs with them. Upon returning to Goa from Kuwait, Vaz collaborated with other Konkani singers based in Goa such as Lawry Travasso and Francis de Tuem. They would perform together as a quartet or trio, although their involvement isn't regular due to their busy tiatr schedules, which can clash with each other. As of January 2023, Vaz had bookings for five tiatrs. He even performed in four tiatrs in one day, showcasing his busy schedule. In November 2022, he had a schedule of six tiatrs but had to cancel two due to time conflicts with his other performances.

Vaz also performed with his father, Master Vaz, even during the latter's old age. One of their memorable performances was in Francis de Tuem's tiatr, Reporter, staged in 2019 in Panjim, Goa. In this tiatr, Vaz and his father performed as a duo, receiving a positive response from the audience. Vaz sang about his father's alcohol drinking habits, including incidents where he would vomit blood. During this performance, Tomazinho Cardozo and his wife were in the audience. When Vaz sang about his father, Tomazinho's wife became furious and was ready to stop the song. However, the song was not a criticism of his father; it was quite the opposite. When Vaz brought his father on stage at the end of the song, the audience understood the true meaning, leading to a round of applause. As of 2012, some of the popular tiatrs Vaz has written include Mutt Bhor Mati, Rogtacho Fator, and Rogtak Rogot, among others. He has also directed tiatrs such as Xim Vo Ximiter, Almanchea Disa, and Pamprel, etc. Known for his acting roles in tiatrs by C. Alvares, Prem Kumar, and M. Boyer, Vaz is also recognized as a singer in popular tiatrs like Upkar Naslolo, Bombay Dekho, and Irmanvcho Cheddo Mhozo Put, etc.

== Personal life ==
Vaz worked as a welder for a company in Kuwait. He initially moved to Kuwait to work before 1979 and then retired in 1998, returning to his home state of Goa. He maintains a close friendship with Konkani singer Xavier Gomes, his fellow trio member from the Cajetan-Marcus-Xavier fame. Vaz prefers road trips and avoids attending parties or public events like weddings. During his time in Kuwait, Vaz met his future wife, Maria Assumpta Goretti Vaz (née Pereira), who was also based there.

Vaz's sisters Felez and Maxie are also involved in khell tiatr productions as stage actresses. As of 2012, Vaz resides in the village of Utorda, Goa, his mother's hometown.
