= Konkani Wikipedia =

Konkani-language edition of Wikipedia

- Logo of the Konkani Wikipedia
- Website type: Internet encyclopedia
- Available in: Konkani
- Headquarters: Miami, Florida, U.S.
- Owner: Wikimedia Foundation
- Website: gom.wikipedia.org
- Commercial: No
- Registration: Open read access. No registration needed for general editing, but necessary for certain tasks including: • protected page edit; • page creation; • file upload
- Launched: July 2015
- Content license: Creative Commons Attribution/ Share-Alike 4.0 (most text also dual-licensed under GFDL); Media licensing varies

Konkani Wikipedia is the Konkani language edition of Wikipedia, run by the Wikimedia Foundation. It was started in July 2015. Prior to this, it had been in incubation since 2006. Currently, there are 3,644 content articles in the project. The total number of edits on this Wikipedia is 215,055. The Konkani Wikipedia is also the Wikipedia with the least active users to have an article on the English Wikipedia.

== History ==
Konkani Wikipedia went live in July 2015, after being in incubation since 2006. Earlier in September 2013, 4 volumes of Konkani vishwakosh (encyclopedia) were relicensed under Creative Commons Licenses. Information from these volumes of encyclopedias were used to write articles on Konkani Wikipedia. In the same year, a Wikipedia-related workshop was organized at Goa University. In April 2014, two introductory sessions on editing Wikipedia were conducted at Roshni Nilaya School of Social Work in Goa.

In July 2015, the Wikipedia went live after incubation for 9 years. At the time of the official inauguration, the Wikipedia contained 2500 articles. The project was supported by Goa University and the Nirmala Institute of Education. Madhavi Sardesai, then a professor and Head of Department of Konkani at the Goa University, played an important role in the launch of the project. Prakash Parienkar, the current head of department of Konkani department of Goa University, had said at that time:

We will assign projects to our students and writers too, to write articles on different subjects related to Goa and upload them on the Wikipedia. This will include information on local food, its culture, tradition, tourist spots and much more.

In January 2016, a one-day edit-a-thon was organized at Krishnadas Shama Central Library, Goa. Rahmanuddin Shaik, a Center for Internet and Society representative, trained the participants about Wikipedia editing and policies. Almost 100 articles were created during this one-day event.

== Konkani Wiktionary ==
Another parallel initiative is the Konkani Wiktionary project. It seeks to build an open and shareable Konkani dictionary in cyberspace. As part of its activities, a Wiktionary workshop and meet-ups were held at St. Xavier's College, Mapusa in May 2019 and December 2019. Approved in March 2020 by the Language Committee of the Wikimedia Foundation, the Konkani Wiktionary moved to its newly created site on 21 May 2020. It has over 2300 entries (in November 2020).
