= Vinayak Sadashiv Sukhthankar =

Indian writer (1903–1977)

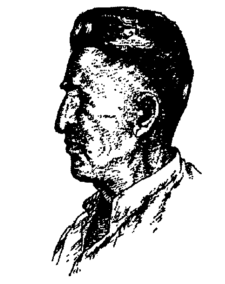
- Born: 3 March 1903 Colvale, Portuguese India (now Goa, India)
- Died: September 18, 1977 (aged 74) Mumbai, Maharashtra, India
- Occupation: Writer, screenwriter, folklorist
- Language: Marathi, English, Tamil
- Genre: Regional fiction, folk literature, children's literature
- Notable works: Sahyadrichya Paithyashi, The Tales and Tellers of Goa
- Notable awards: Gold medal at Gomantak Sahitya Sammelan (1975)

Vinayak Sadashiv Sukhthankar (3 March 1903 – 18 September 1977) was a prominent writer from Goa, recognized for pioneering regionalist fiction in Marathi literature. His work extensively documented the rural life and folklore of the Goan countryside.

== Early life and education ==
Sukhthankar was born on 3 March 1903 in Colvale, Goa. He completed his primary Marathi education up to the fourth grade in Panaji, followed by middle school at Saraswat Vidyalaya in Mapusa. He initially pursued Portuguese education through the Lyceum in Panaji but later decided to switch to an English-medium curriculum. To facilitate this, he moved to Dharwad to attend a government school. He pursued higher education at Fergusson College in Pune. Additionally, he completed a six-month specialized course in milk production.

== Literary career ==
Sukhthankar primarily indulged in folk literature (lok-sahitya). His travels through the villages of Goa provided the inspiration for his regional stories. In 1926, he published his first story, titled Katu Kartavya. His 1939 collection, Sahyadrichya Paithyashi (At the Foot of the Sahyadris), is regarded by critics as the first authentic regional story collection in Marathi literature due to its vivid portrayal of the Goan landscape and social life.

He contributed poetry and prose to several notable periodicals, including Anand, Chitramayjagat, Purusharth, and Ratnakar. Under the influence of Shridhar Venkatesh Ketkar, he wrote Govyatil Janpadgani (Folk Songs of Goa) for the magazine Vidyasewek. His other prose works include a biography of the Portuguese poet Luís de Camões. In 1974, he published an English book titled The Tales and Tellers of Goa, which explored the state's oral traditions.

=== Children's literature ===
Sukhthankar wrote multiple books for children. He published a representative collection of children's poems titled Vasanti and wrote educational books such as Hasta Khelta and Buddhivikas. He also authored biographies for young readers on several prominent people, including:

- Rabindranath Tagore
- Leo Tolstoy
- Sister Nivedita
- Swami Rama Tirtha
- Swami Vivekananda
- Mahatma Gandhi
- Jawaharlal Nehru

== Work in film and other languages ==
Sukhthankar also worked as a screenwriter. His story "Jai-Jui" was adapted into the film Devdasi by Orient Pictures Corporation. Although he wrote screenplays for Mahapurachi Shikvan and Peshwaitlo Ramshastri intended for production by Bombay Talkies and V. Shantaram of Prabhat Film Company, these projects did not reach completion.

He served as a co-writer for the screenplay of the film Bahot Din Huya, produced by S. S. Vasan. During a period spent in Madras around 1962, he contributed to Tamil, Telugu, Hindi, and English periodicals. He notably wrote a 15-chapter novel on Ramshastri Prabhune for the publication Andhrapattika, which was later released as a book.

== Works ==
- Katu Kartavya (Short story, 1926)
- Sahyadrichya Paithyashi (Story collection, 1939)
- Vasanti (Children's poetry collection)
- Govyatil Janpadgani (Prose/Research)
- The Tales and Tellers of Goa (English book, 1974)
- Hasta Khelta (Children's literature)
- Buddhivikas (Children's literature)
- Ramshastri (Novel, published by Andhrapattika)
- Biography of Luís de Camões
- Biographies of Tagore, Tolstoy, Nivedita, Rama Tirtha, Vivekananda, Gandhi, and Nehru
- Bahot Din Huya (Film screenplay, co-writer)
- Jai-Jui (Story adapted for the film Devdasi)

== Death and recognition ==
In 1975, Sukhthankar was honored with a gold medal at the Gomantak Sahitya Sammelan for his contributions to literature. He died in Mumbai on 18 September 1977.
