= Manuel D'Lima =

Indian playwright and theatre director (1934–2016)

- Born: c. 1934; Porvorim, Goa, Portuguese India, Portuguese Empire
- Died: October 2016 (aged 81–82); Santacruz, Mumbai, Maharashtra, India
- Other names: Manuel de Lima; M. J. D'Lima
- Occupations: Playwright; theatre director; banker; musician
- Years active: 1970s–2000s
- Employer: Bank of India
- Known for: Staging religious plays during Lent
- Notable work: Soddvondar (1970s)
- Musical career
- Origin: Goa, India
- Genres: Goan music; beat music
- Formerly of: The Syndicate

Manuel J. D'Lima (Note: alternatively spelt as Manuel de Lima) (c. 1934 – October 2016) was an Indian former playwright, theatre director, musician, and banker known for his work in tiatr productions and radio plays. He began his career in his hometown of Porvorim, Goa. Following his move to Santacruz, Bombay, D'Lima began to produce commercial theatre productions. Later, he began to write radio plays and skits on All India Radio, Bombay. A former member of the Goan cover band The Syndicate, D'Lima became known mainly for his religious plays that he staged during the Lent season in Goa or Bombay. He is one of the early writers of religious tiatrs that were staged in the 1970s.

== Early life ==
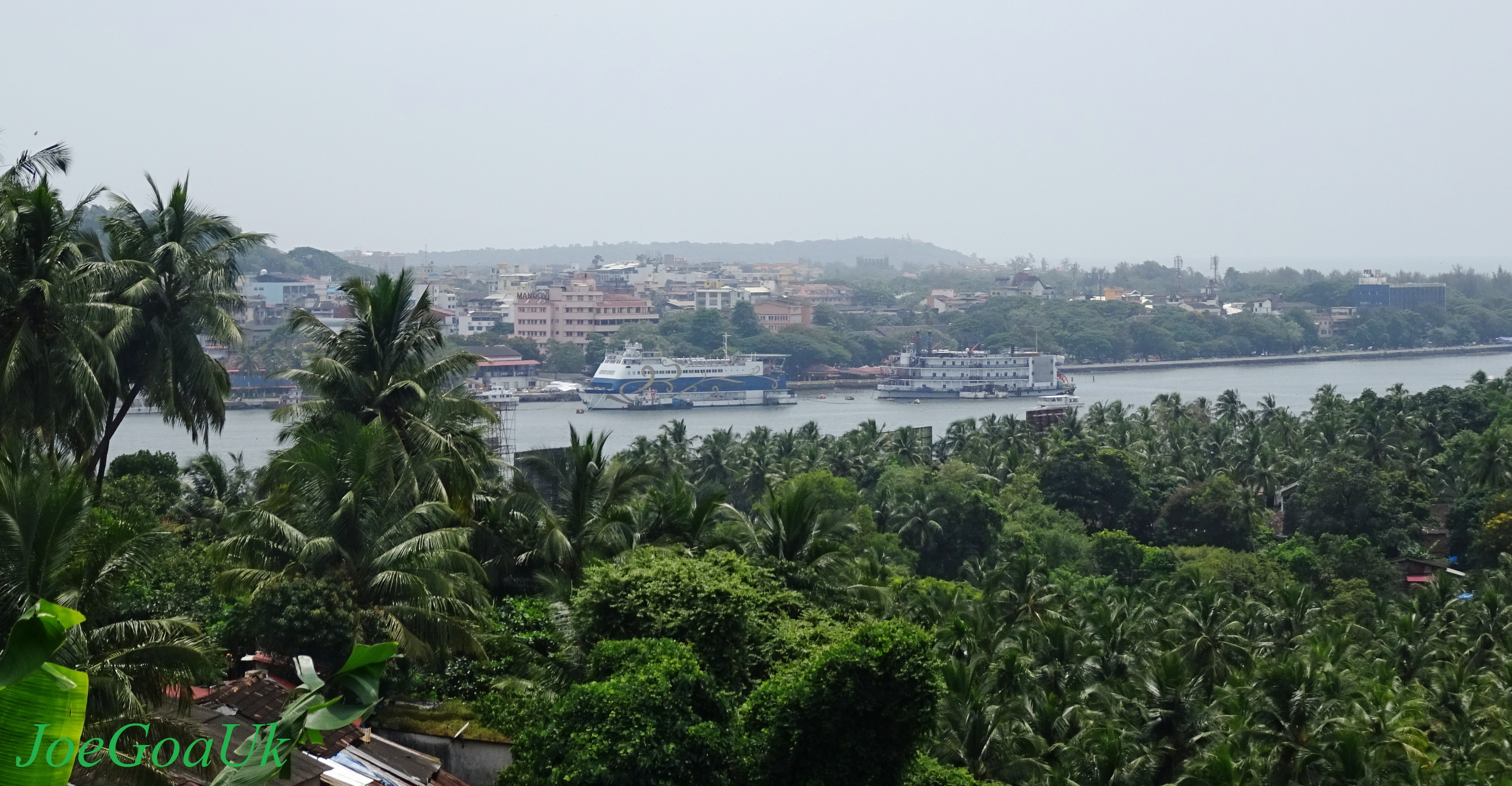
View from a hill in Porvorim, Goa, where D'Lima spent his early years.

Manuel J. D'Lima was born in 1934. He hailed from the town of Porvorim, in the colony of Goa, which was then part of Portuguese India, during the Portuguese Empire (now located in India). He began his stage career in his home region writing and staging Konkani tiatrs, a form of musical theatre indigenous to Goa. These productions found an audience in Porvorim.

== Career ==
=== Introduction to theatre and radio in Bombay, British India ===
D'Lima moved to Bombay, British India (now Mumbai, India), a metropolis known for its vibrant entertainment industry. There he presented his first major tiatr, Ek Oklek Don Noure (The Bride With Two Bridegrooms), in support of Socorro-Union, a type of social club in Socorro, Goa around the mid-20th century. The play debuted in Porvorim, his native town located in the coastal region of Goa. D'Lima also began work with All India Radio, the state-owned public radio broadcaster in Bombay, where he secured a position as a regular artist. On this platform, also known as Akashvani, he wrote approximately 100 small playlets and radio comedy skits.

=== Subsequent move to religious plays during the Lent season ===
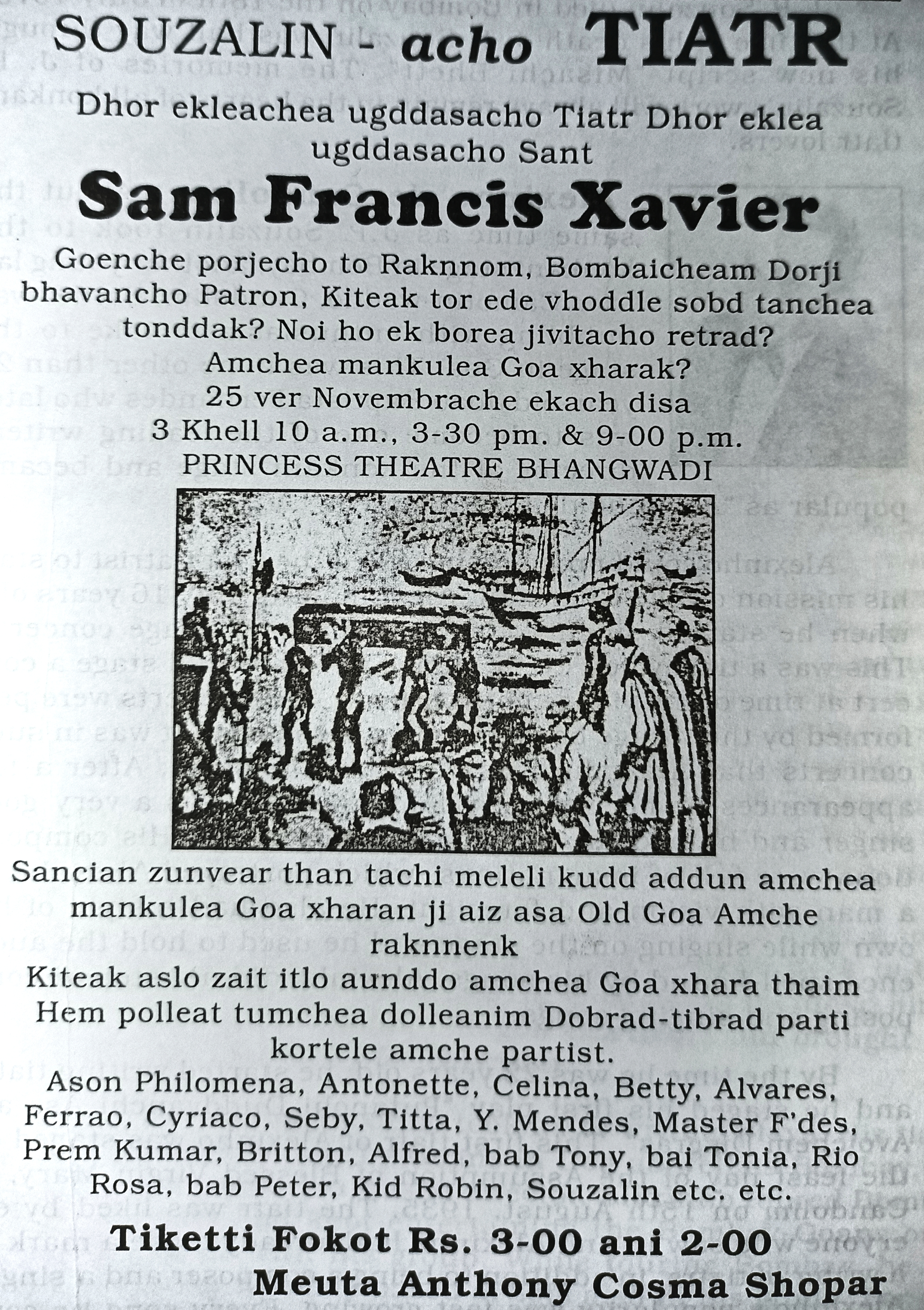
A religious tiatr handbill, Sam Francis Xavier by J. P. Souzalin, in Konkani

D'Lima's contributions to Goan theatre extended beyond secular-themed performances, as he also staged Christian religious plays in the mid-1970s. Although predominantly biblical in nature and tied to the season of Lent, these productions aimed to inspire introspection, contemplation, and personal transformation among their audiences. He, along with Konkani dramatists such as Simon C. Fernandes, Remmie Colaço, Prem Kumar, Robin Vaz, and Aleixinho de Candolim, is credited with upholding the legacy of Souzalin's religious tiatrs. Collaborations among D'Lima and other performers within the Konkani theatre community included Cyriaco Dias, a Konkani actor and playwright, who played Jesus Christ in D'Lima's religious tiatr Soddvondar (The Deliverer).

The Soddvondar production featured notable cast such as Xavier Mendes, of the musical trio the Mendes Bros (Felix, Derrick and Xavier Mendes), during the play's staging in Bombay. It was also performed in Panjim, Goa, featuring Dioguinho D'Mello in his final acting performance. Collaborating with popular actors from the Konkani stage, D'Lima began to write a series of up to seven larger-scale tiatrs productions during the late-20th century. These include Europi Saukar (European Banker), Shakuntala, Bism Saib (The Bishop), Milagr (The Miracle), Khorkhos Ostori (Inevitable Woman), Soddvondar (The Deliverer), and Quo Vadis? (Where are you going?). D'Lima cast drummer Tony King in the latter play. D'Lima's introduction to religious plays was initiated by J. P. Souzalin's play Saibinicheo Sath Dukhi (The Seven Sorrows of Mary), staged during the early 1970s.

=== The Syndicate band and tiatr contracts (1980s–2000s) ===
D'Lima was involved in the Goan music scene as a member of the popular 1980s cover band known as The Syndicate, formed in 1979. The Syndicate disbanded around the year 2002. D'Lima then entered into a partnership with fellow artist Santan Rodricks. They initially accepted tiatr producing contracts (Note: Tiatr contractors oversee the logistical and financial components necessary to stage Konkani theater performances. The primary responsibilities include securing performance venues, managing audio/technical equipment, and handling promotional activities for tiatr shows. In November 1986, tiatr contractors earned approximately ₹17,000 (equivalent to ₹230,000 or US$2,700 in 2023) per show in a 2,000 seat venue and around ₹10,000 (equivalent to ₹140,000 or US$1,600 in 2023) in a 1,000 seat venue.) under the pseudonym "Lima-San." D'Lima was one of the early tiatr contractors operating in Bombay from the 1980s to the 2000s, but during this period, D'Lima shifted his focus from writing and directing tiatrs to banking and managing tiatr contracts. D'Lima worked in the banking industry for the majority of his working life. His work at Bank of India ultimately led to his decision to discontinue theatre work.

== Personal life ==
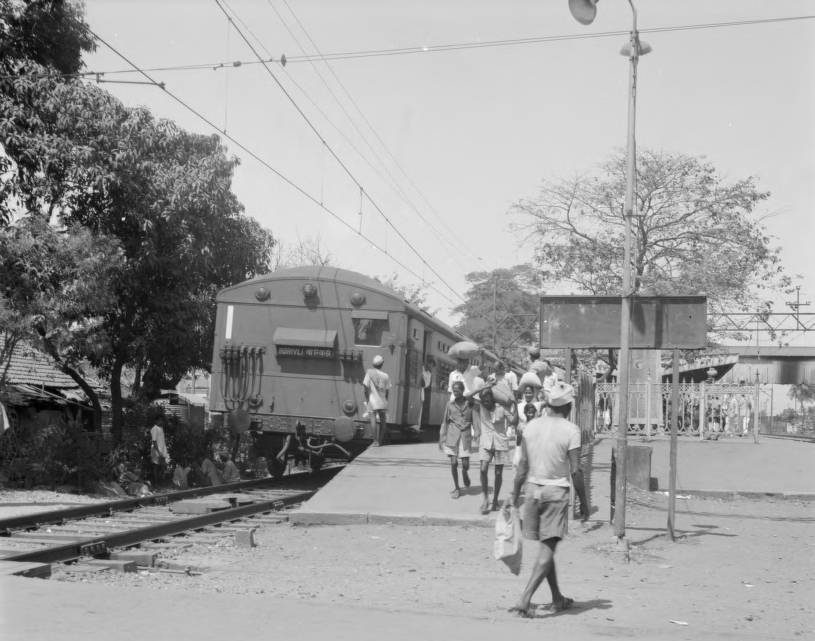
Santacruz railway station in 1952, one of the stations used by the Goan Catholics during internal migration

D'Lima resided in Santacruz, Mumbai, with his family. In October 2016, he died at his home in Santacruz. He was around 81–82 years old.

== Selected stage works ==
=== Tiatrs ===
Year	Title	Role	Notes	Ref
	Ek Oklek Don Noure	Writer	Professional debut	
	Europi Saukar	Writer		
	Shakuntala	Writer		
	Bism Saib	Writer		
	Milagr	Writer		
	Khorkhos Ostori	Writer		
1970s	Soddvondar	Writer		
	Quo Vadis?	Writer		
