= Leena Fernandes =

Indian actress and singer (1929–2021)

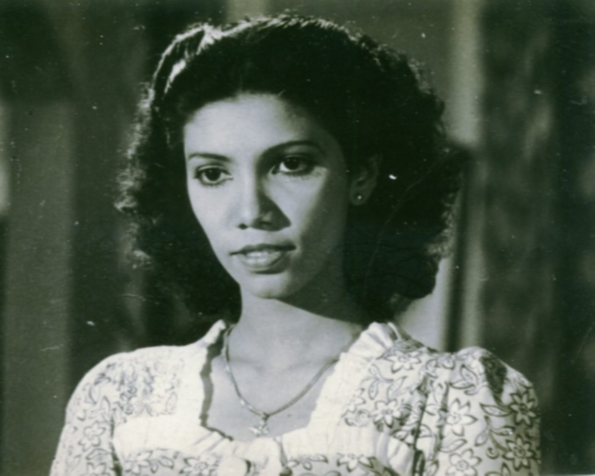
- Dias as Maria in Mogacho Aunddo (1950)
- Born: 19 December 1929; Bombay, British India
- Died: 30 July 2021 (aged 91); Mumbai, Maharashtra, India
- Occupations: Actress; singer; telephone operator
- Known for: First leading lady of Konkani cinema
- Notable work: Mogacho Aunddo
- Spouse: Joseph Dias
- Children: 3
- Relatives: Cyriaco Dias; Jessie Dias

Leena Dias (née Fernandes; 19 December 1929 – 30 July 2021) was an Indian actress and singer known for her role in the first Konkani film, Mogacho Aunddo (1950). She is credited as the inaugural leading lady of Konkani cinema.

== Career ==
Filmmaker Al Jerry Braganza's inspiration to create a Konkani film emerged during a stroll along Marine Drive, Mumbai, where he observed the prominent display of posters for English, Hindi, and Marathi films. Motivated by this observation, Jerry Braganza embarked on a mission to realize his ambition of producing a Konkani film. In his quest for a suitable leading lady, Jerry Braganza visited the office of United Artists, a foreign film distribution company. It was there that he encountered Dias, whom he boldly approached with an offer to star as the heroine in his film. With the consent of her parents, Dias agreed to take on the role. The production of Mogacho Aunddo commenced on 31 July 1949, marked by a muhurat ceremony officiated by Fr. Macario Pereira. The film was subsequently released on 24 April 1950, simultaneously in Bombay and Goa. However, the film encountered numerous challenges throughout its production, including restrictions imposed by the Portuguese regime in Goa, as well as logistical difficulties and customs-related issues.

Notably, during that era, it was uncommon for women to participate in acting roles. Dias, who worked as a telephone operator and possessed singing abilities, revealed in an interview that the actors received a monthly salary, with Dias herself earning approximately ₹500 (equivalent to ₹55,000 or US$570 in 2023) per month. Given the absence of dubbing facilities at the time, the actors were required to deliver their dialogues and songs live during filming. The music for Mogacho Aunddo was composed by a group of 27 musicians under the leadership of Joe Perry and Peter D'Mello. The film was shot in a studio located in Chembur, with additional outdoor scenes filmed in various locations across Goa, including Velha Goa Churches, Mapuça Church, Calangute beach, Mandovi River, Aguada Tower, and the Altinho and Campal areas of Pangim. In terms of the cast, Jerry Braganza assumed the role of Abela, Dias portrayed the character of Maria, and James Braganza provided comedic moments in the film. Dias also lent her vocal talents to the film, singing the title song as well as featured songs such as "Mogacho Aunddo" and "Mogall Bai" alongside Jerry Braganza. It is worth noting that Mogacho Aunddo stood out as a production that did not rely on stage artists. The screening of Mogacho Aunddo was accompanied by a documentary recounting the visit of Our Lady of Fatima to Goa. Although Dias received acclaim for her performance in the film, this marked her first and only appearance in the acting realm, as she did not pursue any further film projects thereafter.

== Personal life ==
Dias was born as Leena Fernandes on 19 December 1921, in Bombay, Bombay Presidency, which was then part of British India and is now known as Mumbai, Maharashtra, India. Although she hailed from the census town of Siolim in Goa, she resided in Mumbai. She was married to Joseph Dias, with whom she had three children: a son named Elvis and two daughters named Phyllis and Joana. She was also related to Konkani actors Cyriaco Dias and Jessie Dias.

== Death ==
On 30 July 2021, at the age of 91, Dias died in Mumbai, Maharashtra, after a brief period of being bedridden.

=== Reactions ===
In October 2021, the Goa Legislative Assembly acknowledged Dias' death, along with other distinguished individuals such as Hausatai Patil, Balaji Tambe, Buddhadeb Guha, Dattaram Maruti Mirasdar, Jagjit Kaur, Nedumudi Venu, Ghanashyam Nayak, Arvind Trivedi, and Sidharth Shukla, during an obituary reference session.

== Filmography ==
Year	Title	Role	Notes	Ref
1950	Mogacho Anvddo	Maria	Debut film	
