= Prakash Parienkar =

Indian writer (born 1968)

Prakash S. Parienkar
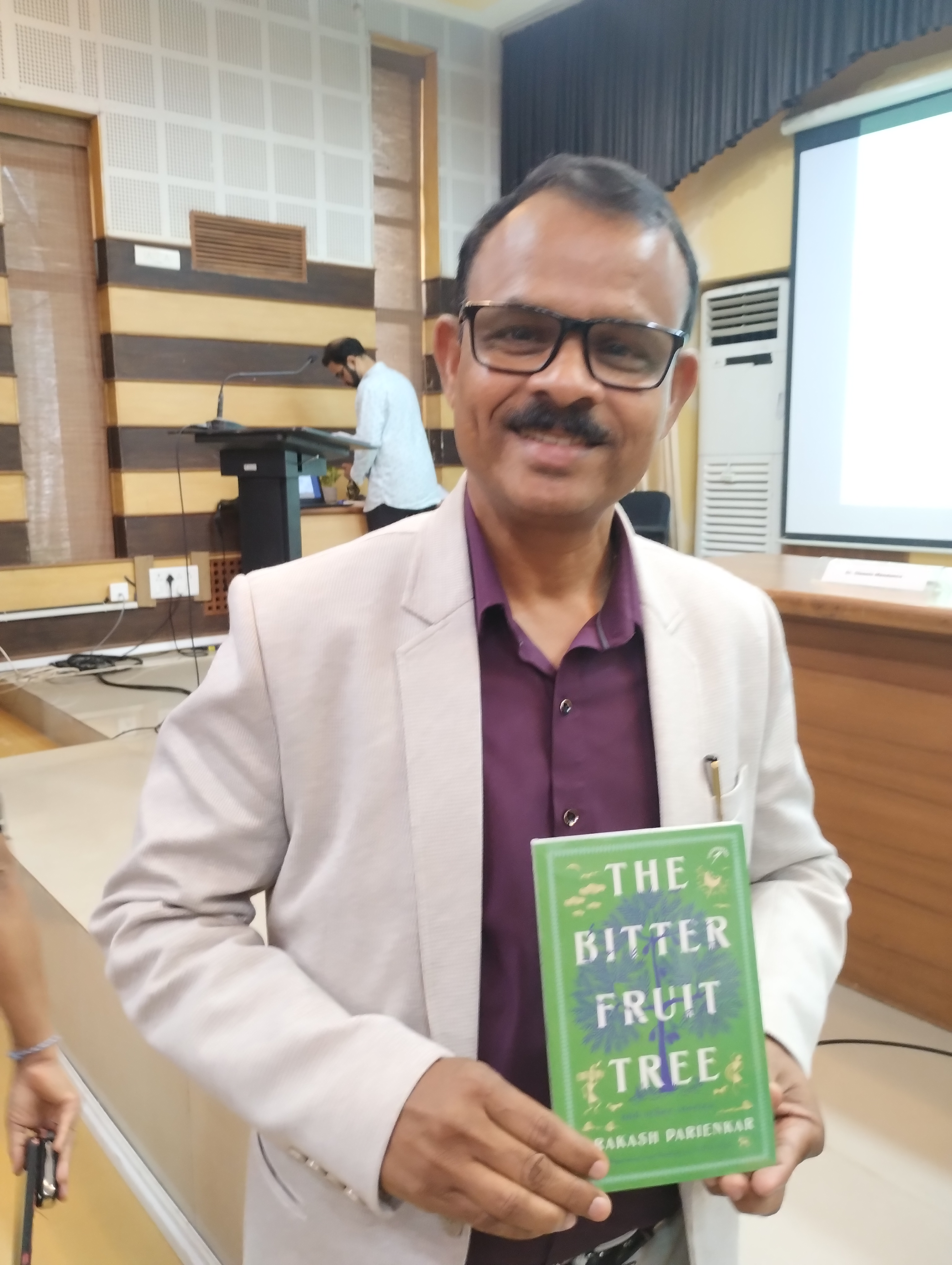
- Parienkar in 2025
- Born: 30 July 1968 (age 58); Dhave, Sattari, Goa, India
- Education: M.A., M.Com., B.Ed., Ph.D.
- Occupations: Associate Professor, writer, researcher
- Writing career
- Genres: Short stories, children's literature, essays, research
- Notable works: Varsal, Igadi Bigadi Tigadi Tha, The Bitter-Fruit Tree and Other Stories
- Notable awards: Sahitya Akademi Award (2023); Sahitya Akademi Bal Sahitya Puraskar (2010)

Prakash S. Parienkar (born 30 July 1968) is an Indian writer, academic, and researcher from Goa. He is primarily known for his contributions to Konkani literature, for which he has received multiple national honors, including the Sahitya Akademi Award in 2023. He currently serves as an Associate Professor and Vice Dean (Research) at the Shenoi Goembab School of Languages and Literature, Goa University.

== Early life and education ==
Parienkar was born on 30 July 1968 in Dhave, a village in the Sattari taluka of Goa. He completed his higher education with an M.A. in Konkani and an M.Com. in Management Studies, followed by a B.Ed. and a Ph.D. from Goa University. His upbringing in the forested regions of northeastern Goa significantly influenced his literary focus on rural life and local traditions.

== Career and literary work ==
Parienkar's writing often depicts the social, cultural, and agricultural rhythms of village life in Sattari. His short story collection Varsal (2021) explores the struggles and joys of rural communities against the backdrop of the Western Ghats. In 2024, an English translation of thirteen of his short stories was published by Niyogi Books under the title The Bitter-Fruit Tree and Other Stories, translated by Vidya Pai.

Beyond fiction, Parienkar is a noted researcher. He authored Mhadei: Kallzantlyan Kagdar, an eco-anthropological study of the Mhadei River basin, which documented the region's biodiversity and cultural heritage. He is also actively involved in reviving traditional agricultural practices, such as "Puran Sheti," a silt-based cultivation method unique to the Sattari region.

In addition to his academic and literary roles, he has served as the President of the Gramin Sahitya Sammelan (Rural Literature Convention) in 2018.

== Adaptations ==
His literary works have seen success in other media formats. The short film Kaajro, based on one of his Konkani stories, was awarded the Best Regional Film at the 67th National Film Awards. His screenplay for the short film Ek Thembo Ashecho also received state-level recognition in Goa.

== Awards and recognition ==
Parienkar has received several prominent awards throughout his career:

- Sahitya Akademi Award (2023): For his short story collection Varsal.
- Sahitya Akademi Bal Sahitya Puraskar (2010): For his children's play Igadi Bigadi Tigadi Tha.
- Katha Award (2003): For the Konkani short story Chandrakor.
- Yuva Srujan Puraskar: Awarded by the Government of Goa for his contributions to Konkani literature.
