= Dioguinho D'Mello =

Indian writer and singer (1908–1976)

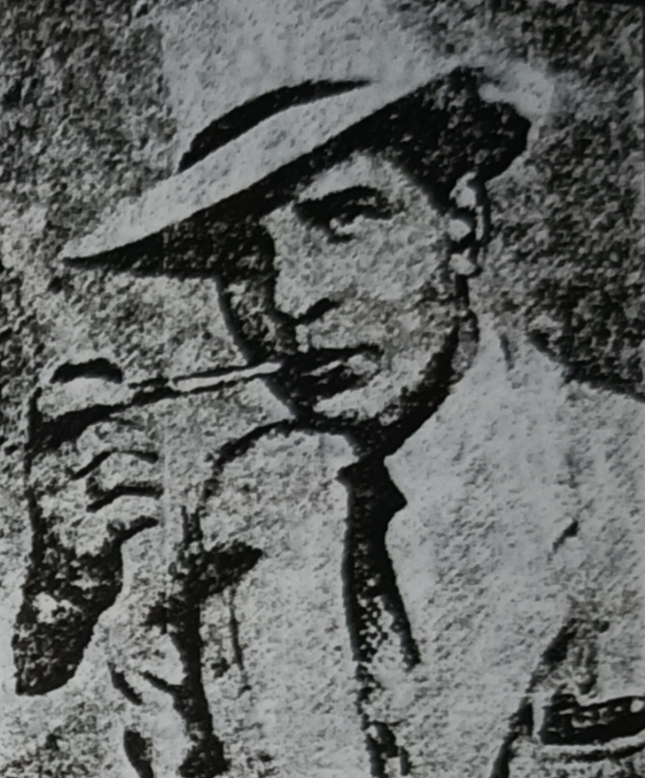
- Portrait of de Mello during his youth
- Born: Francis Diogo Romano de Mello; 3 March 1908; Pangim, Goa, Portuguese India, Portuguese Empire
- Died: 30 September 1976 (aged 68); Goa, India
- Other names: Diodem
- Occupations: Writer; singer; playwright; sailor
- Years active: c. 1925–1970s

Francis Diogo Romano de Mello (3 March 1908 – 30 September 1976), known professionally as Dioguinho D'Mello, was an Indian writer, singer, playwright, and sailor known for his work in tiatr productions. Referred to as the "Ambassador of the Konkani stage" by writer Fausto V. Da Costa, he was a multilingual singer. Using the pen name Diodem, de Mello wrote for publications such as The Goa Mail and The Goa Times of Bombay. In addition to Mogachi Vodd, he penned several novels including Tambddo Moyekar, Dharunn Calliz, Khotto Put, Konn Zait To Crimidor?, and Ugddas 1901 Vorsacho.

== Early life ==
Francis Diogo Romano de Mello was born on 3 March 1908, in Pangim, Goa, which was part of Portuguese India during the Portuguese Empire. He was a native of Candolim. His early education was conducted in the Portuguese language, while his higher education was in English. This bilingual upbringing enabled him to develop proficient skills in both languages. De Mello embarked on a career in the industrial sector, initially working at the Mazagon Docks and later at Richardson and Cruddas in Bombay. However, his adventurous character led him to pursue opportunities as a steward on various ships, allowing him to voyage to destinations such as Europe, Mexico, and Miami in the United States of America. Even from a young age, de Mello displayed a keen interest in singing. According to writer Tomazinho Cardozo, de Mello possessed a "beautiful voice and a distinctive singing style, which contributed to the charm of his performances".

== Career ==
De Mello introduced a unique yodelling technique characterized by a natural tremolo in his voice. His yodelling performances often resulted in applause. De Mello's vocal style encompassed melodic and expressive sounds, transitioning between falsetto and his normal voice. His literary work, Mogachi Vodd, which had its second edition released in 1971, served as the inspiration for the first black and white Konkani film titled Mogacho Aunddo, produced by Al Jerry Braganza of Mapuçá. The film premiered on 24 April 1950. De Mello commenced his career on the Konkani stage at the age of 17. His compositions featured songs in Konkani, English, and Portuguese, often translating English songs into Konkani, a practice commonly adopted by solo singers in tiatrs during that era. De Mello's performances garnered acclaim, earning him a reputation and bringing recognition to the state of Goa. As he traveled worldwide, he showcased Konkani songs at various events, effectively promoting Goan culture and acting as a cultural ambassador for the Konkani stage. During his visits to Bombay, de Mello actively participated in tiatrs.

De Mello was known for his adeptness in composing and performing a diverse range of songs, including Mandos, Dulpods, and devotional compositions. His musical repertoire encompassed a wide array of themes, exemplified by tracks such as "Atom Bomb," "Hem Mannic," "Cheddum Forsugelem, "Ponnjechea Pattear," "Orasaum Fatima Saibinnik," and "Sam Francis Xavier." These compositions gained popularity among the Goan populace and continue to be sung at places of worship, Mando festivals, and other auspicious occasions to this day. De Mello belonged to an era where he showcased his talent for blending English and Konkani songs, distinguishing him from his contemporaries. Among his peers were Patrick Fireman, Luis Borges, Emidio Sailor, Anthony Vaz, A. R. Souza Ferrão, Souza Guiao, and Anthony De Sa. In 1947, de Mello's vocal abilities earned him the first prize in a singing competition held at the Indo-Portuguese Institute in Bombay. During a visit by the Stars of Portugal to Goa, he was recognized as the preeminent voice of Goa among the gathering of singers. Many of his compositions were recorded by record labels such as Gramophone Company India and Twin/Tone Records, further contributing to their popularity. Additionally, de Mello collaborated with his sister Ismenia, creating duets that captivated audiences in tiatrs, which are popular Goan theatrical productions. He played a pivotal role in promoting the works of fellow tiatrists by introducing them to The Gramophone Company of India. His support and guidance played a significant role in establishing Jacinto Vaz as a professional musician, as he facilitated Vaz's admission into the National Artist Unity. Furthermore, de Mello assumed the key position of lead singer and organizer of the Konkani section of Emissora de Goa, a broadcasting station dedicated to promoting local talent and culture.

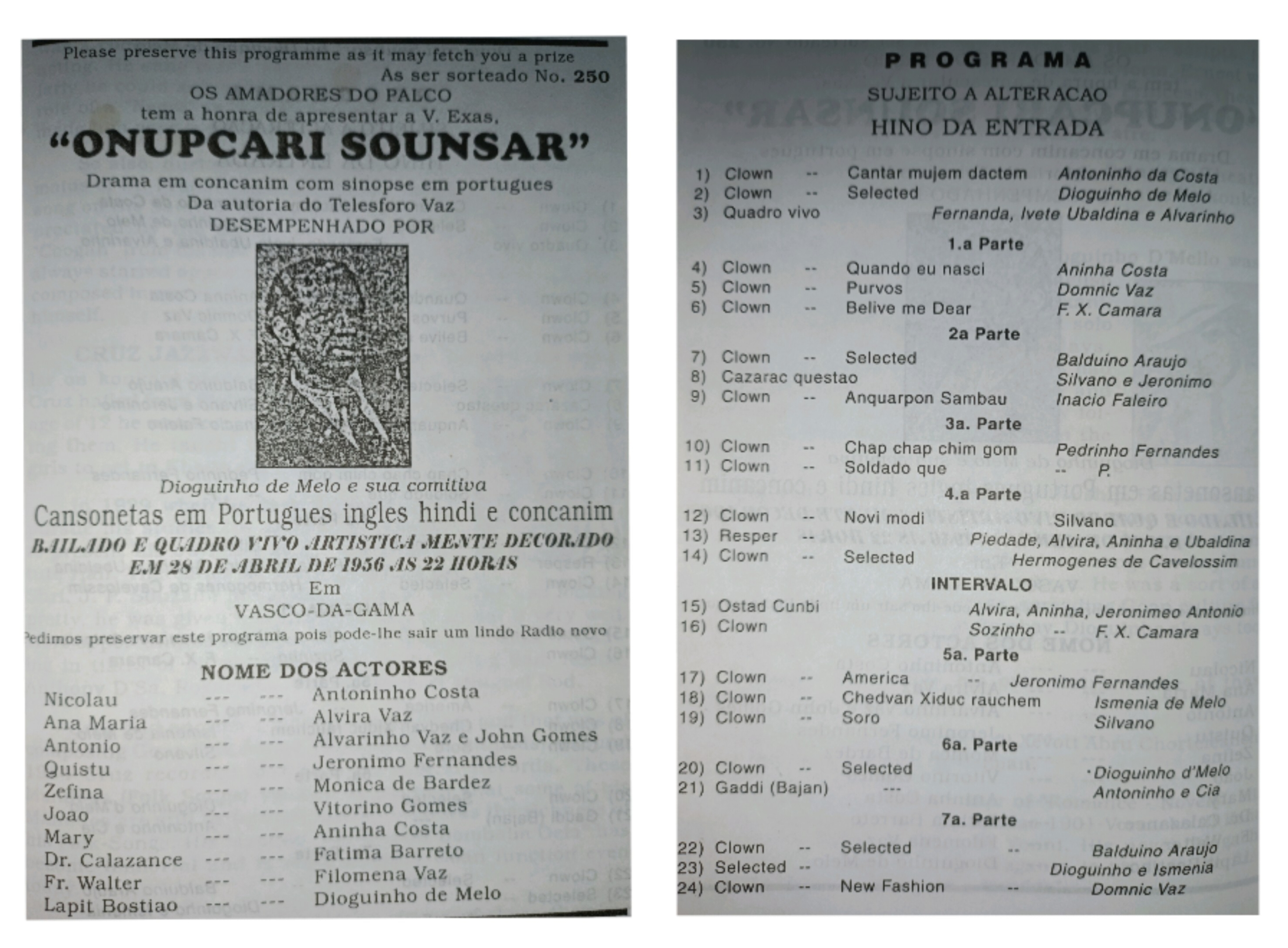
"Lucky programme" for tiatr Onupcari Sounsar by de Mello (left), and programme summary from the lucky programme for the tiatr (right)

De Mello was known for his contributions to the tiatr genre in Goa as a playwright too. His repertoire included popular works such as Don Ghoranchi Dusmankai, Dog Talhar Noure, Xevott Abru Chorteleancho, Addecho CID, Don Endde Afrikanist, Beiman, Hi Doganchi Dusmankai, and Sun Vo Visvaxi Bail, among others. While many of De Mello's tiatrs achieved success and acclaim, a few of his works, including Sotachem Hatiar, Niropradhi Chor, and Bhikxecho Inam, were not staged for public performances. Despite this, De Mello also made contributions as an actor in tiatrs directed by others. Even after losing his eyesight, De Mello displayed dedication to his craft by making a final appearance in Manuel D'Lima's production of Soddvonddar in Pangim. The audience, composed of ardent tiatr enthusiasts, greeted him with a round of applause. Beyond his involvement in tiatr, De Mello exhibited versatility as a writer, contributing articles to publications such as The Goa Mail and The Goa Times of Bombay under the pen name Diodem. He also delved into the realm of romance novels, crafting literary works including Mogachi Vodd, Tambddo Moyekar, Dharunn Calliz, Khotto Put, Konn Zait To Crimidor?, and Ugddas 1901 Vorsacho. Throughout his career, de Mello established himself as a dedicated and responsible artist, approaching his work with commitment and consistency, writes Fausto V. da Costa.

Author Fausto V. da Costa sheds light on the life of de Mello, as a seafarer, through a publication featured in the Evening Chronicle (London) on 15 May 1953. Da Costa's account reveals that de Mello possessed talents as a singer and demonstrated prowess in his theatrical performances. During his stay at Blyth port in London, where his vessel was undergoing an extensive three-month repair process, de Mello's devout adherence to Roman Catholicism led him to actively partake in the Eucharistic celebration every Sunday. He fostered a warm rapport with the parish priest, who extended invitations to de Mello and his fellow Goan crew members to participate in a program encompassing dance, songs, and cuisine. During this memorable occasion, de Mello captivated the audience by delivering a repertoire of seven songs. This was succeeded by an invitation to the prominent social group, where he once more gained the admiration of everyone present. His talent quickly became the talk of the city, that spread throughout London. As the time approached for de Mello and his Goan companions to resume their maritime journey, the Blyth District Club and its members organized a farewell gathering in their honor, In recognition of de Mello's contributions, he was bestowed with a memento, symbolizing the cherished memories forged during their time together. It is worth noting that de Mello holds the distinction of being the first tiatrist, a Goan theatrical artist, to have graced an English stage with his singing. In addition to his performances in his native Goa and Bombay, de Mello's talents also captivated audiences in locations such as Liverpool, Birkenhead, Glasgow, Veracruz, Mexico, the United States, and Africa.

== Personal life ==
De Mello had a sister named Ismenia Fernandes (née de Mello), who was employed by Emissora de Goa and was a singer in the Konkani theatrical genre. De Mello was recognized as a devoted Roman Catholic, regularly participating in Eucharistic celebrations, even during his travels as a seafarer. His sister, Ismenia, resided in the Orda ward in Candolim and was a neighbor of writer and politician Tomazinho Cardozo. De Mello frequently visited his sister, engaging in evening singing sessions with her and their friends. Despite declining health that led to the loss of his eyesight in his later years, de Mello remained active, demonstrating his passion for Konkani language, Konkani theatrical performances, and Konkani music through his creative endeavors. On 30 September 1976, he died, aged 68, in Goa.

== Selected stage works ==
Year	Title	Role	Notes	Ref
	Don Ghoranchi Dusmankai	Writer		
	Dog Talhar Noure	Writer		
	Xevott Abru Chorteleancho	Writer		
	Addecho CID	Writer		
	Don Endde Afrikanist	Writer		
	Beiman	Writer		
	Hi Doganchi Dusmankai	Writer		
1956	Onupcari Sounsar	Lapit Bostiao	Also writer & director	
	Sun Vo Visvaxi Bail	Writer		
	Sotachem Hatiar	Writer	Unreleased tiatr	
	Niropradhi Chor	Writer	Unreleased tiatr	
	Bhikxecho Inam	Writer	Unreleased tiatr	
	Soddvonddar	Unnamed role	Final production	

== Bibliography ==
- Mogachi Vodd (second edition published in 1971)
- Tambddo Moyekar
- Dharunn Calliz
- Khotto Put
- Konn Zait To Crimidor?
- Ugddas 1901 Vorsacho
