= Xavier Gomes =

Indian singer and playwright (born 1949)

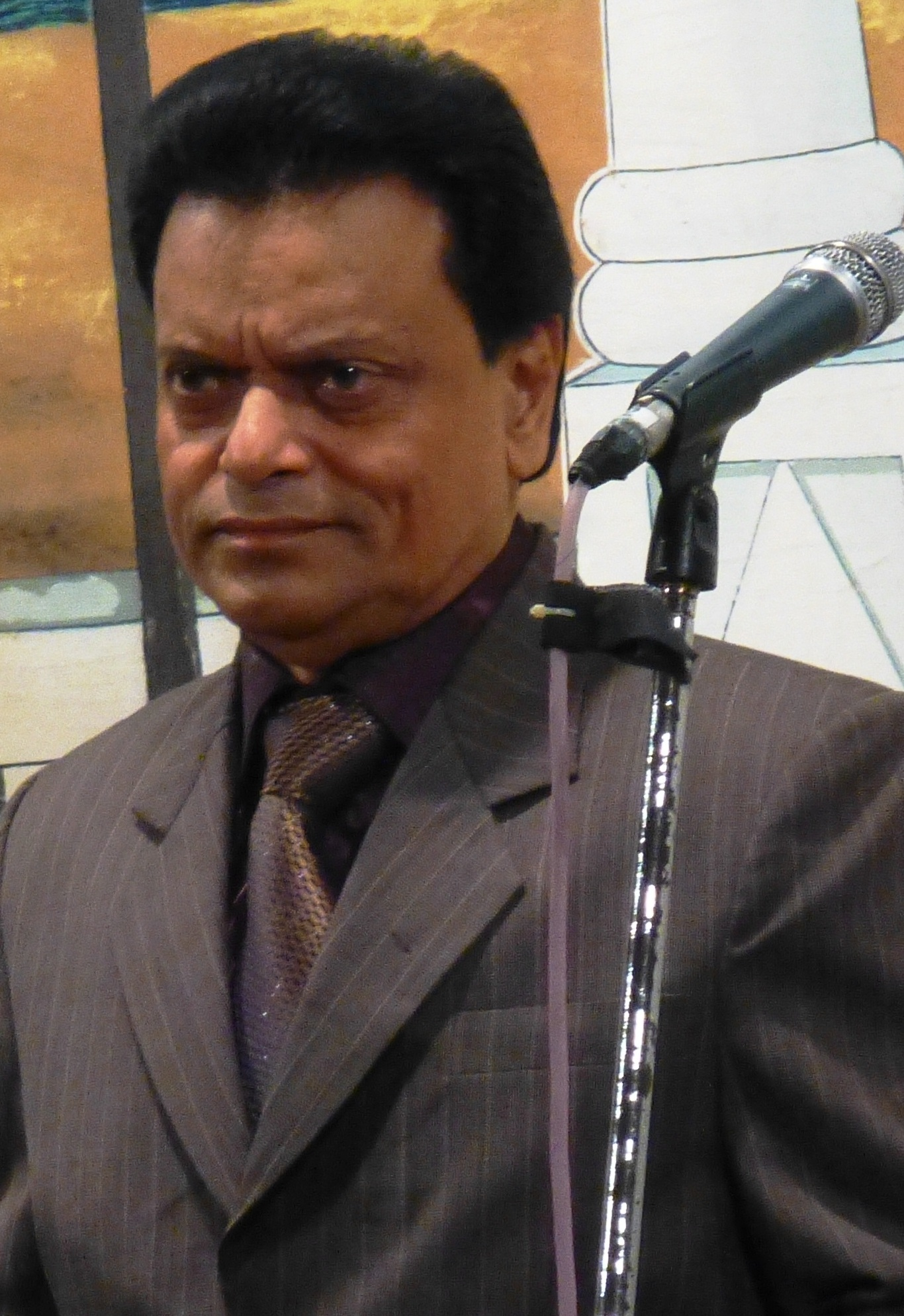
- Gomes at a tiatr production, 2013
- Born: Jose Xavier Gomes; 3 December 1949 (age 76); Santo Estêvão, Goa, Portuguese India, Portuguese Empire
- Other names: X. Gomes
- Occupations: Singer; theatre actor; playwright; director
- Years active: c. 1962–present
- Spouse: Luiza Gomes
- Children: 2
- Website: facebook.com/xavier.gomes.108

Jose Xavier Gomes (born 3 December 1949) is an Indian singer, theatre actor, playwright, theatre director, and former drummer who works on the Konkani stage.

== Career ==
Gomes began his performing arts career at the young age of 8, appearing on the tiatr stage in a village drama production. At 13 years old, he made the transition to Bombay (now Mumbai), where he got the opportunity to participate in theatrical performances under the direction of the popular Konkani theater figure, C. Alvares. In 1974, Gomes ventured to Kuwait seeking improved prospects, where he sustained his engagement in the performance and production of tiatrs in the region. During this period, Gomes also wrote and directed three of his own original tiatr plays - Kazaracho Inam, Sonvsarant Korin Vhoddlo?, and Hanv Tuka Kedinch Bhogxichim Nam. In addition to his work as a singer, Gomes was a drummer who performed with various musical groups. He maintained an active presence in the Konkani tiatr scene in Goa, appearing regularly in productions directed by popular figures such as Prem Kumar, M. Boyer, Prince Jacob, Mario Menezes, John D' Silva, Mariano Fernandes, Lawry Travasso, and Sammy Tavares, among others.

Gomes also contributed to the Konkani performing arts in other ways. He contributed his vocal abilities to various audio recordings, particularly audio albums, and independently produced multiple albums as well, including Bore Kristanv, Otmeank Rozar Kor, Jezuk Okman Kelo, and Indian Passport. Additionally, Gomes created popular video albums like Ghorkarachi Zodd and Bhavancho Ekvott. Throughout his career, Gomes maintained a strong presence in the Konkani tiatr scene, performing regularly not only in Goa and Mumbai, but also in the Gulf region (mainly Bahrain, Qatar, Dubai, Abu Dhabi, and Muscat), the West and also internationally in places like London, France, Germany. Over the course of his career, Gomes is estimated to have appeared on more than 200 Konkani audio and video recordings (CD/VCDs). He played a vital role in introducing and promoting the art of tiatr performances in Kuwait as one of the early pioneers in the field.

=== Introduction to drumming ===
Speaking about his transition from being a singer to becoming a drummer, Gomes explains that before going to Kuwait, he used to perform as a singer in tiatrs staged in Bombay. In Kuwait during the late 20th century, many tiatrs were also staged. One day, during a tiatr rehearsal in Kuwait, Gomes attended as a singer. At that time, he did not play the drums or own a drum set. Instead, he would play with cooking pots and sticks at home, but not professionally. During the rehearsal, he noticed the drummer's beats, which he did not like accompanying his song. Gomes asked the drummer to play the beats according to his instructions. In response, the drummer gave Gomes a serious and surprised stare. At the time he was in Kuwait, Gomes was quite new in the country, he was in his 20s, and his youth was the reason for moving to Kuwait. The drummer remained quiet when Gomes expressed his opinion. Later, Gomes once again urged the drummer, telling him that he was not comfortable with the beats. The drummer replied that "new kids often complained about the same thing, and that if one actually plays the drums, they would understand how difficult it is".

In Kuwait, there was a sort of practice within the tiatr tradition during the 1970s. If a tiatrist came to perform in a tiatr in Kuwait, their whole family would accompany them, usually consisting of 2–3 family members. During the tiatr rehearsal attended by Gomes, there were many audience members present. The drummer once again played the drums, but Gomes did not like the beats as they did not match his singing. Gomes asked the drummer once more to rectify the issue as he himself was not comfortable with it. In response, the drummer threw his drum sticks onto the drums in front of the audience. This incident occurred during Gomes' first tiatr production as an amateur singer in Kuwait. Witnessing this reaction from the drummer, Gomes felt embarrassed. Gomes' roommate Marcus, a Konkani singer who performed with Gomes as a duo, encouraged Gomes to play the drums. Initially hesitant as he had never owned a drum set or played drums professionally, except for playing on cooking pots and sticks at home, Gomes gathered the courage, and prepared himself to play the drums.

During their tiatr rehearsal, there was a band leader who was a saxophonist. He instructed Gomes, a singer with no prior knowledge of playing the drums, to play the instrument in any way that felt comfortable to him. Gomes informed the band leader that he was not a drummer and could only identify incorrect beats with instructions. Despite this, the band leader persisted in asking Gomes to play, as their original drummer was tired of being criticized by young Gomes for his incorrect beats. When the band began playing, Gomes surprisingly played the correct beat for one verse. While playing the drums, Gomes would also sing. Following this, Gomes spoke with the original drummer, asking him to play his beats while Gomes sang along to that rhythm. The drummer was shocked by this response. The drummer had ongoing issues cooperating with other band members, and within a month for some unspecified reason, the band decided to part ways with the drummer. Subsequently, two band members visited Gomes at his residence in Kuwait, informing him about their previous drummer's departure and expressing their need for a new drummer. Gomes explained to them that he was not a professional drummer and did not even own a drum set.

Upon learning that Gomes was somewhat hesitant to join their band, the two band members assured him that they would guide and support him. They informed him that there was only 1–2 months remaining until a show scheduled for 31 December. Upon hearing this, Gomes became nervous as he would have to play the drums for a specific number of musical pieces and songs. He requested a few days to consider their offer. Gomes resided in a bachelor's residence with 6-7 other boys in Kuwait. There was an elderly woman living nearby who offered encouragement to Gomes, advising him to purchase a drum set since he did not own one, and she promised to assist him. Due to his limited salary, Gomes could not afford to buy a drum set. The elderly woman paid for his drum set, and Gomes contacted the band members. His first drum set was from Pearl Drums. Gomes then began daily rehearsals for the upcoming show, focusing on basic drumming without incorporating techniques like drum rolls. Subsequently, Gomes continued to play the drums for the next 17–18 years until he became a professional drummer.

== Personal life ==
Gomes resided in Kuwait from 1974 until his retirement in 1993, after which he returned to his home state of Goa. He is married. According to the 2012 Directory of Tiatr Artistes, Gomes lived at Palmar Vaddo in St Estevam, Goa.

== Style ==
Gomes is recognized for his unique performance style, characterized by dancing to the rhythm of the introductory music before he begins to sing. This ritualistic stage entrance is a customary feature of Gomes's performances, with audiences anticipating his performances when the band plays his signature beats.
