= St. Sebastian Goan High School =

High school in Maharashtra, India

Coordinates: 18.9491°N 72.8230°E

Information
- Religious affiliation: Catholicism
- Established: 1925; 101 years ago
- Gender: Mixed
- Language: English

St. Sebastian Goan High School is co-ed English medium school in Mumbai, recognized by the Maharashtra State Board of Education. A Christian school founded in 1925, it is supported and administered by the Roman Catholic Church, and under the religious jurisdiction of the Archbishop of Mumbai.

== Alumni ==
- Atul Kale, actor, musician, and director
- Jeetendra(Ravi) Kapoor, actor
- Rajesh Khanna, actor
- Dilip Joshi, actor
