= Liceu Nacional Afonso de Albuquerque =

Portuguese school in Portuguese India

The Liceu Nacional Afonso de Albuquerque (1854-1961), formerly known as the Liceu Central de Nova Goa, was a Portuguese public secondary educational institution in Nova Goa, Portuguese India, created by decree on 9 November 1854. The decree was issued by then Governor of Portuguese India Joaquim José Januário Lapa, the first Viscount of Vila Nova de Ourem.

The institution celebrated its 150th anniversary in 2004.

== Current status ==
With the end of Portuguese India, the institution joined the Indian system of education, to become extinct in its earlier form.

Following the end of Portuguese rule in Goa, and with the absorption of the region into the Indian Union, "this prime educational institution suffered a quick demise". It survived for another year or two. The last batch of Finalistas (final year students) completed their studies after the Portuguese rule ended.

The institution's sprawling facilities were made available to different other institutions that were being set up—the Dhempe College of Arts and Science, a private teachers' training college, a government higher secondary school, the local institution for training children (Bal Bhavan), a law college, the Dempo College of Commerce, and alike. Its former campus, now refurbished, has since become the home of the Goa Bench of the Bombay High Court.

== Notable alumni ==
- Jack de Sequeira, Indian politician and businessman
- Aquino de Bragança, Mozambican physicist and journalist
- Al Jerry Braganza, Indian filmmaker and actor
- Agostinho Fernandes, writer and cardiologist
- Vinayak Sadashiv Sukhthankar, Indian writer
- Janardan Shinkre, Indian freedom fighter and politician
- Julião Menezes
