= Al Jerry Braganza =

Indian filmmaker and actor (1920–1990)

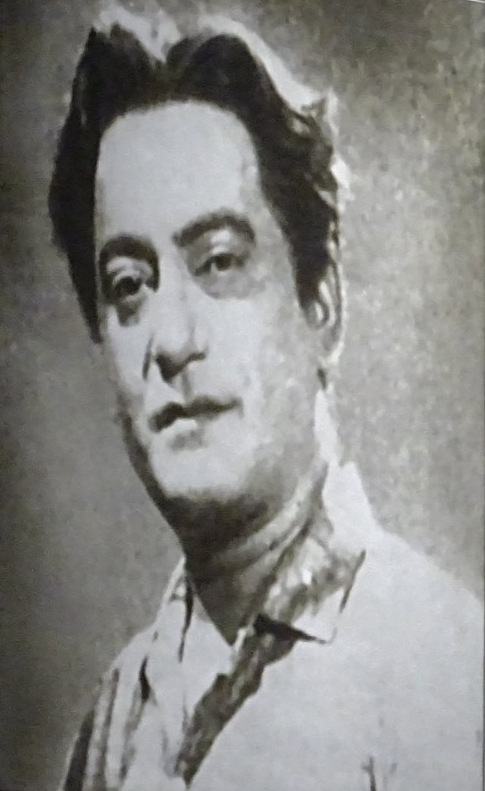
- Portrait of Braganza
- Born: Antonio Lourenço Jerry Braganza; 28 August 1920; Mapuçá, Goa, Portuguese India
- Died: 8 January 1990 (aged 69); Bombay, Maharashtra (now Mumbai), India
- Education: Liceu Nacional Afonso de Albuquerque
- Occupations: Filmmaker; actor; singer
- Years active: 1950–1990
- Employer: Indian News Parade
- Known for: Creation of the first Konkani film
- Notable work: Mogacho Aunddo
- Spouse: Bernadette Braganza

Antonio Lourenço Jerry Braganza (28 August 1920 – 8 January 1990), known professionally as Al Jerry Braganza, was an Indian filmmaker, actor, and singer known for his work in Konkani films. Referred to as the "Father of Konkani cinema," Braganza directed and produced the first Konkani film, Mogacho Aunddo (1950), following the unreleased film Sukhi Konn (1949), an unsuccessful attempt by playwright G. M. B. Rodrigues.

== Career ==
In 1940, Braganza pursued higher education and settled in Bombay (now Mumbai, India). He enrolled at the Bombay Tutorial College and gained practical experience as a motor mechanic at the IEME Workshop in Colaba. Subsequently, he joined the Indian News Parade, which is now known as The Films Division, where he worked as a telephone operator. After completing his college studies, Braganza secured employment in various cinema-related companies. He eventually became affiliated with Geeta Pictures & Studios in Chembur, where he played a pivotal role in the successful production of several Hindi films. Braganza then assumed the position of Chief Controller of Production for Ramesh Vyas and Vishwa Bharati Films. Following his tenure with these companies, he joined the Navakala Film Company as a production assistant and assistant director. Since he knew about filmmaking, Braganza was inspired to undertake the ambitious challenge of creating a film in Konkani, his mother tongue. Encouraged by the enthusiastic support of the Goan community in Bombay for tiatr, a form of theatrical entertainment, Braganza saw the potential for producing a Konkani film. Displaying confidence in his abilities as an actor, director, and singer, Braganza assumed all three roles and embarked on the risky endeavor of filmmaking. The cast he assembled for the film consisted of individuals who were new to the medium and had not previously participated in tiatr, where artists themselves perform the songs. Collaborating with Braganza were a team of Goan Konkani speakers who served as the film's lyricist, music director, and scriptwriter, all driven by their passion for the language.

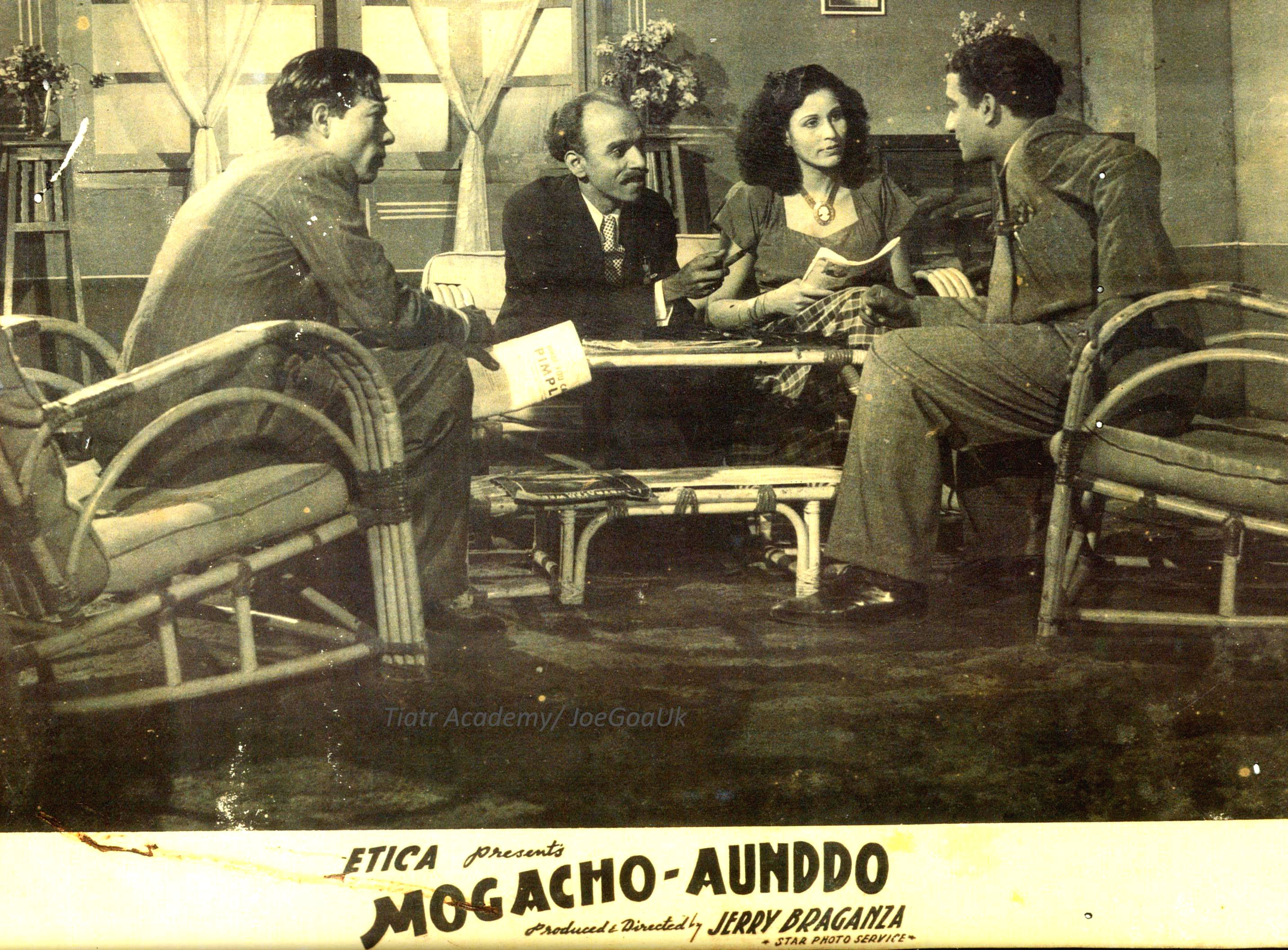
A shot taken from the film, from right to left: Braganza, Leena Fernandes, and Lewis M. Ratus (in the middle).

Mogacho Aunddo is a significant milestone in the history of Konkani cinema, produced under the banner of ETICA (Exchange Talkies of India, China & Africa). The film, based on Dioguinho D'Mello's novella Mogachi Odd (The Crave for Love), holds distinction for being the first Konkani film ever made. The leading actress, Leena Fernandes, who resided in Bombay, showcased her good singing voice despite lacking prior acting experience. The production of the film spanned approximately six months, resulting in a cinematic work. Filming began with a ceremonial muhurat event on 31 July 1949, in the presence of Fr. Macario Pereira. Various locations in Goa, including Campal, the lighthouse at Aguada, the Mandovi River, Calangute Beach, and the Altinho area near the Lyceum building, were chosen as picturesque shooting sites. An interesting aspect of Mogacho Aunddo is that it was the first Konkani film to be produced through crowdfunding. At the time, the concept of producers was not prevalent, prompting Braganza, to seek financial contributions from individuals to bring his vision to life. This approach fostered community involvement in the creation of Goa's inaugural film. In the film, Braganza assumed the lead role of Abel, a wealthy and indulged young man, while Leena Dias portrayed Maria. The premiere of Mogacho Aunddo took place on 24 April 1950, at Dashrat Cinema in Mapuçá, Goa. Concurrently, the film was also exhibited at the Rivoli and Star theaters located in Matunga and Mazagaon, respectively, in the city of Bombay. Braganza's vocal talents were showcased in the film's featured songs, "Mogacho Aunddo" and "Mogall Bai," alongside Leena Fernandes.

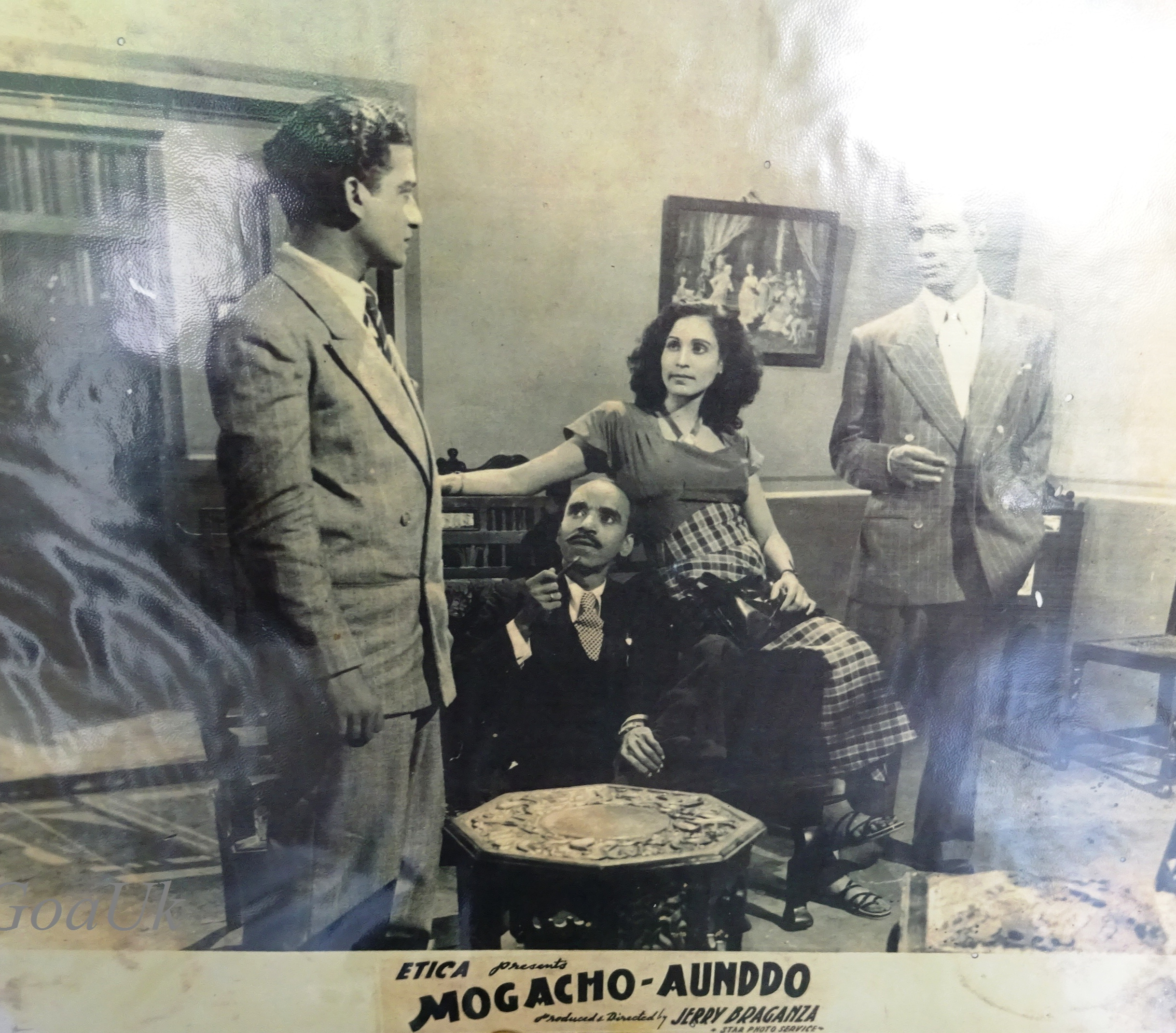
A film still depicting actors from left to right: Braganza, Lewis M. Ratus, Leena Fernandes, and Alfred Almeida.

Braganza was acutely aware of the high expectations surrounding his shows, particularly within the Goan community residing in the Mahim-Bandra and Dhobitalao areas. In addition to these strongholds, his film was also screened in other Goan enclaves, drawing significant interest. The matinée shows held at Liberty near Dhobitalao attracted large and enthusiastic crowds of Goan viewers. However, the financial performance of Braganza's film remains unrecorded. Prior to the release of his debut film, Braganza took a leisurely stroll along Marine Drive and noticed the towering posters promoting English, Hindi, and Marathi films. This sparked an idea in his mind: the creation of a Konkani film. Leveraging his involvement in the film industry, Braganza embarked on the realization of this ambitious goal. His search for a leading lady led him to the offices of United Artists, a foreign film distribution firm. It was there that he encountered a young woman named Leena Fernandes and candidly extended the offer, "Would you like to be the heroine in my movie?" With the consent of her parents, this hurdle was overcome. The production of the film encountered numerous challenges, including restrictions imposed by the Portuguese regime in Goa, difficulties faced at the customs office, and stringent censorship measures. Nevertheless, the Goan community in Bombay eagerly awaited the release of this pioneering Konkani film. Braganza had previously collaborated with comedian Bhagwan during his tenure in Bollywood.

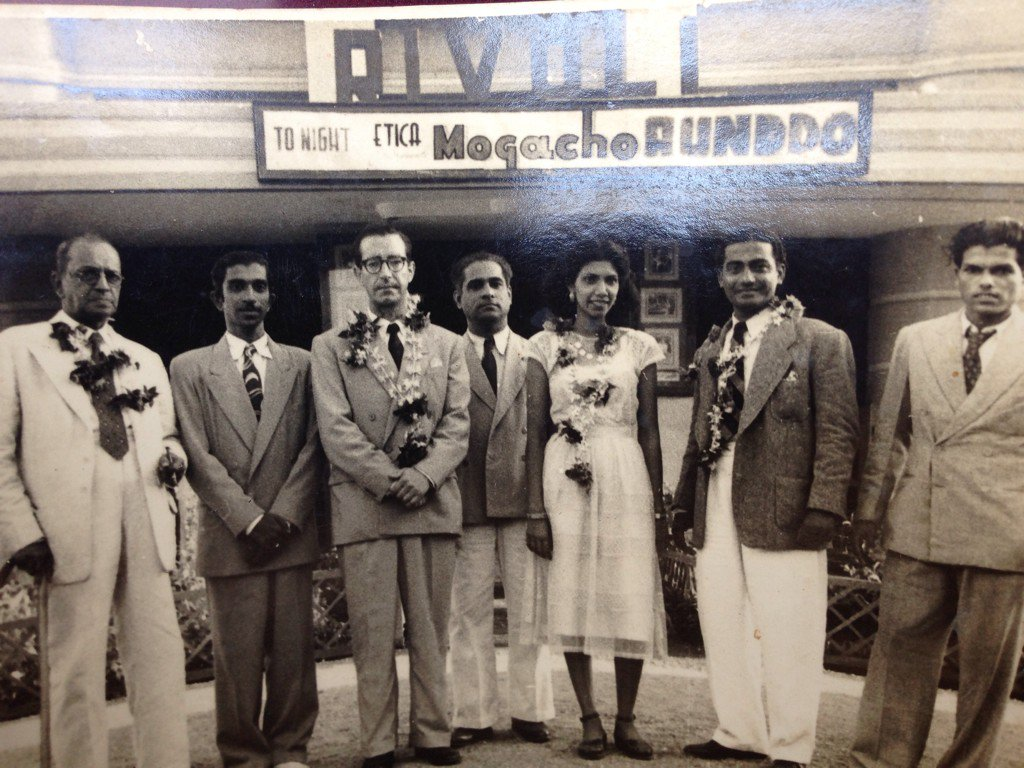
The cast and crew of the film outside the Rivoli Cinema in Matunga.

Following the production of his debut film, Mogacho Aunddo, Braganza embarked on the creation of his second cinematic venture titled Sukhachem Sopon. Prior to the film's release on 9 September 1967, Braganza made a broadcast on 21 June 1966, via All India Radio. During his address, Braganza remarked on the profound astonishment exhibited by the public towards the film production, as if the crew were beings from a distant realm. This reaction was expected, given that it was the first time many individuals had ever witnessed the behind-the-scenes workings of a film shoot. Braganza not only assumed the role of producer for Sukhachem Sopon, but he also made on-screen appearances and contributed as a playback singer. The film received high acclaim from the Konkani audience. In addition to Mogacho Aunddo and Sukhachem Sopon, Braganza's filmography encompasses two more productions. One of these works is a short documentary entitled Nossa Senhora do Fatima, which showcased the reception and procession of Our Lady of Fatima in Goa. This documentary was screened alongside Mogacho Aunddo. The other production was a comprehensive film documenting the exposition of St. Francis Xavier in 1952. Braganza secured exclusive filming rights for this significant event, as reported by The Times of India on 7 September 1950. His intention was to create a documentary that would capture the religious ceremonies, picturesque scenes, and historical landmarks of Goa. This documentary was planned for release in four different versions, catering to Hindi, English, Portuguese, and Konkani-speaking audiences. Lastly, Braganza's final contribution to the world of cinema was his film Kortubancho Sounsar in 1970, where he assumed the lead role.

== Personal life ==
Antonio Lourenço Jerry Braganza was born on 28 August 1920, in Mapuçá, Goa, which was part of Portuguese India during the Portuguese Empire. He later adopted the name Al Jerry Braganza, possibly to enhance his appeal to prospective fans. He received his primary education at the Liceu Nacional Afonso de Albuquerque and Sacred Heart of Jesus High School in Parra. From an early age, Braganza exhibited a passion for singing, acting, and demonstrated skill in the art of yodeling. He was married to Bernadette.

== Death ==
On 8 January 1990, Braganza died in Bombay, Maharashtra, aged 69. Prior to his death, he had been involved in planning a biopic about "Custoba the Great," in which actor Robin Vaz was chosen to portray the rebel Kuxttoba. However, the film project was ultimately abandoned and never came to fruition.

== Legacy ==
In April 2009, Tomazinho Cardozo remarked on the relatively limited recognition given to Braganza for his significant contributions to the Konkani film industry. Despite Braganza's achievements, neither the Government of Goa nor any other Konkani institution had acknowledged his work for an extended period of time. It was only in 2005, after 55 years had passed, that the Dalgado Konknni Akademi (DKA) organized an event on 24 April to commemorate the screening of the inaugural Konkani film, Mogacho Aunddo, and to pay tribute to Braganza's memory.

In May 2014, Premanand Lotlikar, the president of the Dalgado Konknni Akademi (DKA), appealed to the Government of Goa to honor Braganza's legacy by establishing a scheme named after him. This proposed scheme aimed to provide financial assistance for the production of Konkani films, thereby recognizing Braganza's pioneering role in the industry. Lotlikar emphasized that the DKA's celebration of 24 April served as a reminder to both the public and the government of Braganza's achievement as the producer of the first Konkani film, Mogacho Aunddo.

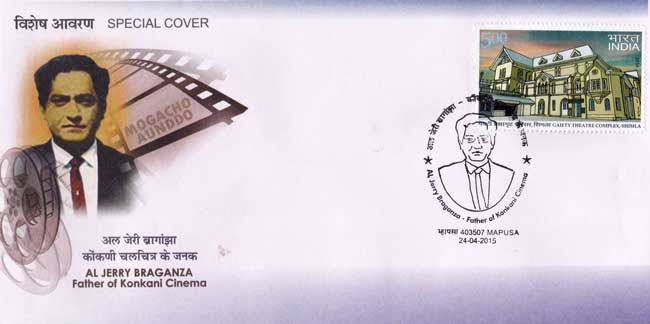
The special cover released by Dalgado Konknni Akademi in 2015.

On 17 April 2015, the Dalgado Konknni Akademi (DKA) announced the forthcoming release of a special cover in honor of Braganza. The tribute ceremony was scheduled to take place at Hanuman Theatre in Mapusa on 24 April, a day recognized as Konkani Cinema Day. Following the announcement, the DKA unveiled a commemorative postage stamp and the aforementioned special cover a week later. During the ceremony, Charles Lobo, the Postmaster General of Goa region, presented an album containing the special cover to the chief guest, Deputy Chief Minister of Goa Francis D'Souza , Dharmanand Vernekar, a film director, attended as the guest of honor, and Bernadette Braganza, Braganza's wife, was also present as a special invitee. Premanand Lotlikar, the president of DKA, took the opportunity to urge the Government of Goa to consider naming a road in Mapusa after Braganza.

In April 2017, Tomazinho Cardozo emphasized the significant role Braganza played in the release of the first Konkani film, Mogacho Aunddo, in 1950. Cardozo underscored that Braganza's contribution laid the groundwork for the subsequent growth of the Konkani film industry. With this in mind, Cardozo called for a grand celebration on Konkani Cinema Day as a fitting tribute to Braganza, with support from the government. He appealed to the Deputy Speaker of the Goa Legislative Assembly to leverage their influence to organize a Konkani Film Festival starting the following year. Such a festival, Cardozo argued, would serve as a catalyst for the advancement of the Konkani cinema sector within the state.

== Filmography ==
Year	Title	Role	Notes	Ref
1950	Mogacho Aunddo	Abel	Also director & producer	
1967	Sukhachem Sopon	Lead role	Also playback singer	
1970	Kortubancho Sounsar	Main role		
	Custoba the Great		Unfinished film	
