= Mogacho Aunddo =

1950 Konkani film directed by Al Jerry Braganza

- Directed by: Al Jerry Braganza
- Written by: Dioguinho D'Mello
- Based on: Mogachi Odd by Dioguinho De Melo
- Produced by: Al Jerry Braganza (ETICA Picture Company)
- Starring: Irene Amaral; Al Jerry Braganza; Elizabeth D'Abreo
- Music by: Alfred Almeida
- Release dates: 24 April 1950 (Mapusa, Matunga and Mazagaon)
- Language: Konkani

Mogacho Aunddo (English: Love's Craving) is a 1950 Goan Konkani-language film. It was the first film in Konkani and was produced and directed by Al Jerry Braganza (Antonio Lawrence Jerry Braganza), a native of Mapusa, under the banner ETICA pictures (Exchange Talkies of India, China and Africa). It was released on 24 April 1950. Hence, this day is celebrated as Konkani Cinema Day, and Al Jerry Braganza is called the 'Father of Konkani cinema'.

== Plot ==
A story of love between a rich spoiled boy and a poor girl.

== Cast and crew ==
- Irene Amaral
- Al Jerry Braganza
- Elizabeth D'Abreo
- Mary D'Souza
- Jacob Fernandes
- Joyce Fernandes
- Leena Fernandes as Maria
- Romeo Paul Pires
- Lewis M. Ratus
- Master Vaz (as lyricist; theme music)

== See also ==
- Konkani cinema
- Nirmon
