= Konkani cinema =

Produced feature films (2023)
- Total: 5 (Theatrical)

Konkani cinema is an Indian film industry, where films are made in the Konkani language, which is spoken mainly in the Indian states of Goa, Maharashtra and Karnataka and to a smaller extent in Kerala. The films have been produced in Goa, Karnataka, Maharashtra and Kerala.

The first full-length Konkani film was Sukhi Konn produced by GMB Rodrigues in 1949 but was never released. Mogacho Anvddo, was released on 24 April 1950, and was produced and directed by Al Jerry Braganza, a native of Mapusa, under the banner of ETICA Pictures. Hence, 24 April is celebrated as Konkani Film Day.

Konkani film Paltadcho munis has been included in the world's best films of 2009 list.

Konkani films are eligible for the National Film Award for Best Feature Film in Konkani.

== Konkani Actors & Actresses ==
The following includes a list of Indian Male Actors and Indian Female Actors who have worked in Konkani Cinema or work in entertainment, though have a Konkani background.

Actors & Actresses are listed in alphabetical by given name.

- Amrita Rao
- Deepika Padukone
- Genelia D'Souza
- Illeana D'Cruz
- Leena Chandavarkar
- Radhika Pandit

== See also ==
- List of Konkani-language films

== Bibliography ==
- Konknni Cholchitram, Isidore Dantas, 2010
- 50 Years of Konkani Cinema, Andrew Greno Viegas, 2000
