= Querobina Carvalho =

Indian comedian and actress (1959–2025)

- Carvalho during her youth
- Born: Querobina Costa Carvalho; 24 October 1959; Margão, Goa, Portuguese India
- Died: 3 July 2025 (aged 65); Margao, Goa, India
- Occupations: Comedian; actress; singer
- Years active: c. 1968–2010s
- Spouse: Agnelo Fernandes (m. 1990)
- Website: facebook.com/querobina.carvalho.7

Querobina Costa Carvalho (24 October 1959 – 3 July 2025) was an Indian comedian, actress, and singer known for her work in tiatr productions.

== Early life ==
Querobina Costa Carvalho was born on 24 October 1959 in Margão, Goa, which was then part of Portuguese India during the Portuguese Empire into a Goan Catholic family. She was born to Diogo Carvalho, a carpenter from the Goan town of Majorda, and Maria Raquel Aranja Fernandes, a homemaker. During her childhood, Carvalho enjoyed the zomnivhele khell, traditional street performances that formed a unique aspect of the Carnival festivities within her community. Diogo, Carvalho's father, was known for portraying tragic characters in the traditional folk performances that featured a group of actors called the Carvalho Brothers.

This group included Diogo and his seven siblings. The Carvalho Brothers collaborated to present zomnivhele khell performances to the village community. Carvalho enjoyed observing her father's performances during these traditional theatrical presentations. In her early schooling years at St Aloysius High School in Majorda, when she was 8 years old, she participated in the school's annual day celebrations by singing a song.

Carvalho's paternal uncle, Agnelo, had studied at the identical academic establishment as she had. This gave him insight into the school's history, and he composed a song for his niece. The audience's appreciation for Carvalho's rendition was demonstrated through the celebratory burning of firecrackers. Carvalho's father expressed admiration for his daughter's musical skills by commenting, "Baien paik nanv haddlem," signifying the honor she had brought to him through her talents.

In addition to solo performances, Carvalho also collaborated with her uncle Agnelo, performing duets at village shows. Agnelo composed melodies intended for the indigenous village festivals held in regions such as Majorda, Madel (Margao), Raia, Navelim, and Ambajim (Fatorda). Carvalho's skills as both a singer and actress later brought her fame with other tiatrists. Jose Mario Pereira from Majorda included Carvalho in his theatrical group after presenting a musical performance on All India Radio (AIR). Popular tiatrists such as A. M. Pacheco and Comedian Peter, who were affiliated with Pereira's ensemble, acknowledged Carvalho's skills while working together.

== Career ==
Carvalho maintained an active career as both a character actress and singer over several years. "During the mid-1990s, she transitioned her focus more towards comedic roles, establishing herself as a popular comedienne on the tiatr stage," writes historian Wilson Mazarello. She has been praised for her singing, having recorded audio recordings particular in audio cassettes and performed on All India Radio. Carvalho has acted in productions by many of Goa's leading tiatr directors, including C. Alvares, M. Boyer, Prem Kumar, Aristides Dias, and Robin Vaz, among others. In 1995, Carvalho took a job opportunity that required her to travel to the Gulf region, leading to a temporary hiatus from the tiatr stage. Despite this break, Carvalho was considered one of the most sought-after female artists in Goan tiatrs during the 1990s, with her stage performances, especially in comedic roles, earning acclaim. Carvalho began her theatrical career at a young age, first appearing in dramas around the age of 9. She made her debut as a singer on All India Radio's Panjim, Goa station when she was 10 years old. Carvalho began acting in professional tiatr productions with the help of director A. M. Pacheco.

Carvalho has provided for her family and sustained herself by earning a living as a professional stage artist in the field of performing arts. Director Patrick Dourado assessed Carvalho's career and acknowledged her capabilities, leading to her taking up comedy roles. This transition ultimately established her reputation for delivering memorable comedic performances. Writer A. Veronica Fernandes states, Carvalho displayed a keen ambition to present her talents and captivate audiences with her skills. From the mid-1990s onwards, she had been engaged in professional activities in Kuwait. During this period, Carvalho had been under the employment of different individuals, notably her Kuwaiti employer, who demonstrates a high regard for her competencies and personal attributes. This is noted as contrasting with the experiences of many other individuals who have complained about their employers in Kuwait. Throughout her career, Carvalho has traveled to perform in various parts of India, the Gulf region, and London. On 11 July 1997, she was a featured comedy performer in a show produced by Rosary Ferns, sharing the stage with popular comedians Prince Jacob and Agostinho. The event, titled Tumkan Lagon Jhielom, was eagerly anticipated by Carvalho's fan base.

Carvalho's early career involved collaborations with several popular Konkani theater directors. She joined the theatrical company founded by A. M. Pacheco, where she gained experience performing in a series of his theatrical productions, including well-known plays like Mr Romeo and Odruxtt. In the subsequent season, Carvalho performed in A. M. Pacheco's Konkani theater play Fator. She maintained her association with the troupe when Benny, Pacheco's brother staged the tiatr Vis Vorsam Adim. Director Patrick Dourado later provided Carvalho with opportunities to perform in multiple tiatrs under his helm, including Sot, Patok, Tem Mhojem Soirem, Maim, and Dev Borem Korum, among others. Carvalho was a member of Dourado's dramatic troupe for nearly 12 years, often taking on serious maternal roles. When Dourado wrote the tiatr Ostori, he directed Carvalho to take on a comedic part. During the Bombay staging of this production, theater contractors Albert and Seby recognized Carvalho as the "Comedy Queen of the Konkani stage". Apart from her contributions to Dourado's work, Carvalho engaged in various tiatrs under the direction of C. D'Silva. She performed in the tiatr Mog, a collaborative effort directed by both Dourado and D'Silva. Following her roles in Dourado's tiatrs, Carvalho was chosen by director M. Boyer to star in his production Mog, Kazar, Divorce, where her comedic talent alongside Boyer garnered praise in Goa and Bombay.

Carvalho made significant contributions to the Goan tiatr theatrical tradition over the course of her career. She gained prominence by joining the productions of leading directors and expanding her reach across multiple theater troupes. Carvalho's flair for comedy shone through as she became part of Prince Jacob's theater group, where she showcased her talent on stage. She appeared in a number of his tiatr (Konkani language plays) productions, including Ponvoth, Panvdde, PoixePoixe, and Poltodd, among others. Carvalho remained an integral part of Prince Jacob's company for approximately five years. After her tenure with Prince Jacob's troupe, Carvalho transitioned to working with director Jose Rod. She starred in tiatrs such as Paus Paus and Nisonn, among others, as a member of Rod's performing ensemble over a three-year period. Following this, Carvalho made appearances in the tiatr Dhump under the direction of Mario de Vasco, and also in the production Familik Ollkhona. In addition to her collaborations with Goan theater directors, Carvalho participated in performances overseen by artists situated in Bombay (now known as Mumbai). This included performances in tiatrs helmed by Bab Peter, such as Mijeas and Tuka Kiteak Poddlam, in addition to productions directed by C. Alvares, Robin Vaz, Wilson Mazarello, Sharon Mazarello, etc. Carvalho is known for her meticulous record keeping of her theatrical activities. She maintained a diary titled Treasury of My Dramas that documented details about the tiatrs she performed in, including the titles, locations, dates, and the compensation she received from the various directors she collaborated with. This allowed Carvalho to closely track her professional engagements and earnings over the course of her career in Goan and Bombay theater.

Before the year 1995, the last recorded instance of Carvalho's stage presence was in a tiatr production overseen by Mario de Vasco. She then traveled overseas and lived in Kuwait for approximately one year, where she participated in tiatr presentations led by several popular Konkani theater directors, including Rosary Ferns, Laurente Pereira, Mario de Majorda, Simon Gonsalves, Salu Faleiro, and Comedian Philip Pereira, among other Goan expatriates. After a substantial hiatus of 14 years, Carvalho reemerged on the Goan tiatr stage in around 2009–2010, when Laurente Pereira cast her in his production titled Hea Ghorachim Daram Bond. In 2017, Carvalho made a return to the tiatr stage after a break of nine years by starring in the production Ami Khuxal, which was directed by Braz de Parra. Within this work, Carvalho portrayed a comedic character and also contributed solo and an opening duet musical performance with Braz. Carvalho is also regarded as part of a select group of contemporary Konkani tiatr comedians who carried forward the legacy established by pioneering Konkani comedic performers such as A. R. Souza Ferrão, Anthony Mendes, Kid Boxer, Minguel Rod, Jacinto Vaz, and M. Boyer.

== Personal life ==
Carvalho had been based in Kuwait since the 1990s. On 24 January 1990, she married Agnelo Jacinto Fernandes, aged 30, who hailed from Utorda, Goa, at the Chapel of the Mother of God in Majorda. Eight days prior, they had their civil marriage registration done in Margao, Goa. Carvalho, who was born in Margao, lived in Majorda, where her parents also resided.

== Death ==
Carvalho died on 3 July 2025 in Margao, Goa, India. She was 65. Her funeral was held on 5 July at Majorda, Goa.
