= Jack Souza Ferrão =

Indian actor and singer (1937–2013)

- Ferrão during his later years
- Born: Joaquim Conceicão Souza Ferrão; 15 March 1937; Sanvordem, Goa, Portuguese India, Portuguese Empire (now in India)
- Died: 25 November 2013 (aged 76); Margao, Goa, India
- Education: Guardian Angel High School, Sanvordem
- Occupations: Actor; singer; playwright; director
- Years active: 1944–2000s
- Organisation: Goenche Fulte Bonge
- Notable work: Amchem Noxib; Nirmon; Bhuierantlo Munis
- Father: A. F. Souza Ferrão
- Relatives: A. R. Souza Ferrão (uncle)
- Awards: TAG's "Lifetime Contribution to Tiatr Award" (2011)

Joaquim Conceicão "Jack" Souza Ferrão (15 March 1937 – 25 November 2013) was an Indian actor, singer, playwright, and theatre director known for his work in Konkani films and tiatr productions.

== Career ==
Ferrão made his debut in the world of tiatr, a traditional Goan form of musical theater, at the age of seven in 1944. He first appeared in the tiatr production called Kunbi Jakki, based on Kunbis, originally written by João Agostinho Fernandes and later restaged and produced by his uncle, A. R. Souza Ferrão. He realized his dream of becoming a tiatrist by participating in another tiatr directed by Antonio Joaquim Dias, who was the father of the Konkani playwright Aristides Dias. This early experience marked the beginning of Ferrão's journey as a performer in the tiatr industry. Throughout his career, Ferrão established himself as a tiatrist, collaborating with Konkani directors such as Florence Fernandes de Santa Cruz, Tony Sax, Menino Colaço, Jephsis Hitler, Remmie Colaço, Rosario Dias, Mike Mehta, Anil Kumar, and others. He showcased his talent and versatility by taking on various roles and working with different directors. He also performed with the group turned organization Goenche Fulte Bonge led by Rosario Dias.

Ferrão's performance in Sadashiv Bandekar's adaptation of William Shakespeare's Hamlet in 1959, staged in Curchorem, garnered acclaim. Another role was his portrayal of a mamlatdar, a local administrative officer, in Mike Mehta's production titled Goem Tum Roddonaka (Goa, don't Cry). Initially, Ferrão started his career by taking on comedy roles but later transitioned to character roles. In addition to acting, Ferrão displayed his musical abilities by lending his voice to several tiatrs, including Bhauponnacho Kaido (The rule of Brotherhood), Onupkari Put (Ungrateful Son), Bhavank Lagon (Due to feelings), Kitem Amcho Fuddar (What is our future?), Kirmidor (The Criminal), Botler Bab, and others. Ferrão's contributions to the tiatr industry extended beyond acting and singing. He ventured into directing, taking charge of Fr. Jose Antonio Costa's tiatr Dr. Alfred and John Dias' Hanv Rinnkari (I'm the Debtor). Furthermore, Ferrão wrote and directed three of his own tiatrs: Nossai (Jealousy), Avoichem Sukh (Mother's Happiness), and Pai Hanv Bhurgo Mungha. Outside of tiatr, Ferrão also made appearances in Konkani films such as Amchem Noxib (1963), Nirmon (1966), Bhuierantlo Munis (1977), Zababdari, and others.

== Personal life ==
Joaquim Conceicão Souza Ferrão was born on 15 March 1937 in Sanvordem, Goa, which was a part of Portuguese India during the Portuguese Empire (now in India), to A. F. Souza Ferrão and Maria Consescao Mascarenhas. Ferrão hailed from a family deeply rooted in the tradition of tiatr, a form of Konkani theater. His paternal uncle, A. R. Souza Ferrão, was a Konkani actor and playwright. Ferrão's passion for tiatr blossomed during his formative years as a student at Guardian Angel High School in Sanvordem. He actively participated in several tiatr productions as an actor. Ferrão performed under the guidance of directors such as Paixão Manuel Pereira, Sebastião Pereira, Abdonio Rodrigues, Mathew Pereira, and Prof. C. A. Gomes. On 25 November 2013, Ferrão died in Margao, Goa, aged 76.

== Awards ==
On 14 December 2011, Ferrão was honored with the "Lifetime Contribution to Tiatr Award" during the commemoration of the 140th Birth Anniversary of João Agostinho Fernandes, the father of tiatr. The event took place at Ravindra Bhavan in Margao and was arranged by the Tiatr Academy of Goa (TAG).

== Legacy ==
On 12 September 2023, the Nosa Senhora De Rosa Mystica Association Goa, in partnership with Special Olympics Bharat Goa, Gujarati Samaj Educational Trust Special School, Margao, and Rev Fr. Franky Fernandes OFMCap, coordinated the inaugural All Goa Jack Souza Ferrao Memorial Special Olympics Futsal Championship 2023. The event took place at the Camp Souza Multi Sports Facility in Camurlim and welcomed sixty special students from six teams representing six schools. Additionally, the tournament included a unified futsal match featuring international footballers.

== Select filmography ==
Year	Title	Role	Notes	Ref
1963	Amchem Noxib			
1966	Nirmon	Titi		
1977	Bhuierantlo Munis			
2004	Zababdari			

== Selected stage works ==
Year	Title	Role	Notes	Ref
1944	Kunbi Jakki	Unnamed role	Debut as child artiste	
1940s	Untitled tiatr			
1959	Hamlet		Konkani adaptation	
	Goem Tum Roddonaka	Mamlatdar		
	Bhauponnacho Kaido	Singer		
	Onupkari Put	Singer		
	Bhavank Lagon	Singer		
1950s	Kitem Amcho Fuddar	Singer		
1973	Kirmidor	Singer		
	Botler Bab	Singer		
	Dr. Alfred	Director		
	Hanv Rinnkari	Director		
	Nossai	Writer/director		
	Avoichem Sukh	Writer/director		
	Pai Hanv Bhurgo Mungha	Writer/director		
