= Clara Dias =

Indian actress and singer (1946–2021)

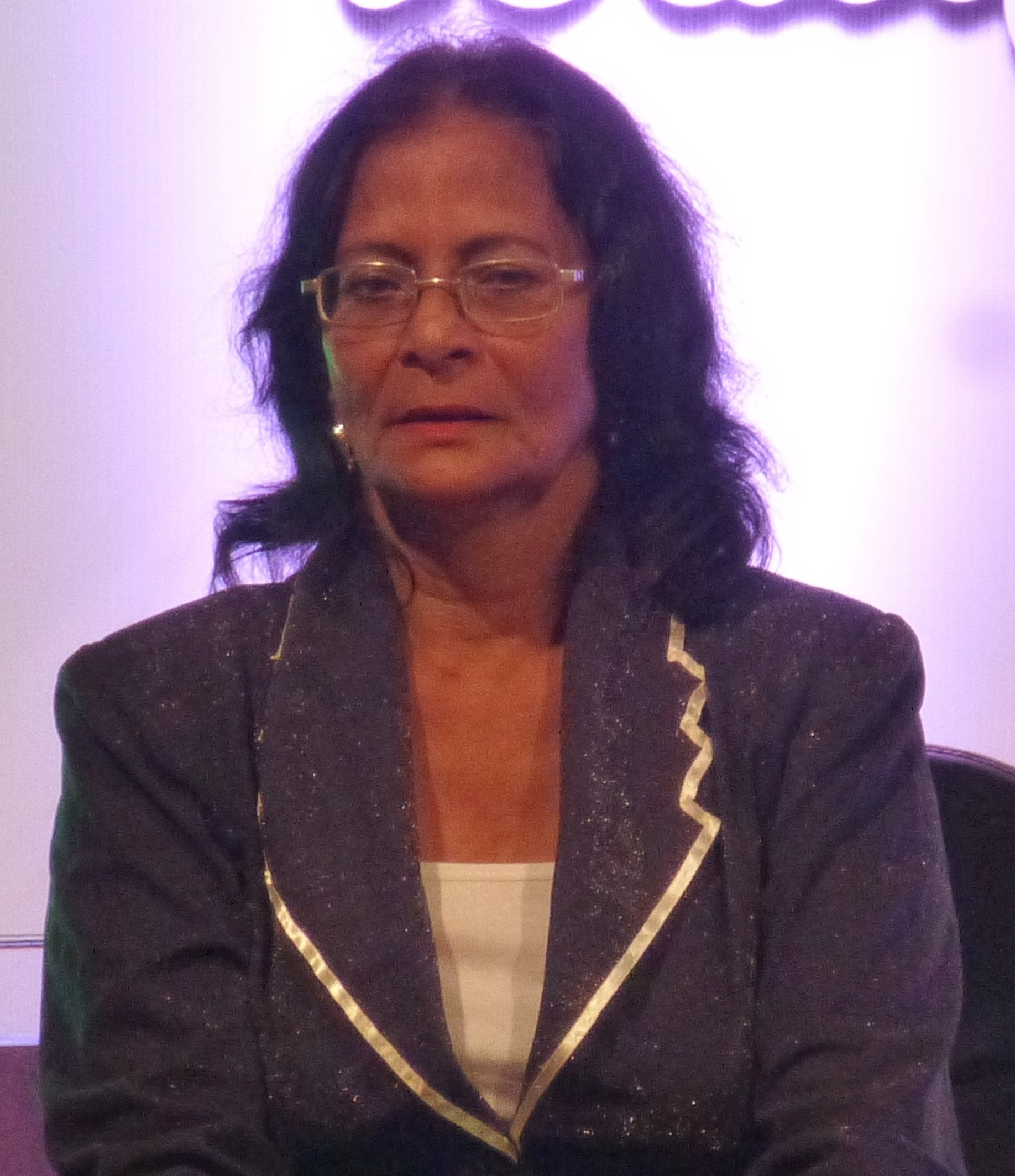
- Dias at Gomant Vidya Niketan in 2016
- Born: Lidvinda Anastasia Clara Correia; 14 April 1946; Bombay, British India
- Died: 18 February 2021 (aged 74); Orlim, Goa, India
- Other name: Clara Correia e Dias
- Occupations: Actress; singer
- Years active: 1961–2021
- Spouse: John Dias (died 2011)
- Children: 1
- Musical career
- Origin: Goa, India
- Occupations: Crooner
- Instruments: Vocals
- Years active: 1961–1964
- Formerly of: Cuckoo

Lidvinda Anastasia Clara Correia Dias (née Correia; 14 April 1946 – 18 February 2021), known professionally as Clara Dias, was an Indian actress and singer known for her work in Konkani films, tiatr productions, and radio plays.

== Early life ==
Dias, born on 14 April 1946, in Bombay, British India (now Mumbai, Maharashtra, India), originally went by the name Lidvinda Anastasia Clara Correia. Her parents, Samuel Feleciano Braz Nazario Correia and Deleciosa Tecla Correia, hailed from Orlim, Goa. Despite her family's lack of involvement in tiatrs, Dias developed a keen interest in observing these theatrical performances. She received her primary education in Bombay and later attended the Portuguese Lyceum in Goa, completing her second year there. Following the region's liberation, Dias pursued her studies at the Multi-Purpose High School in Margao while simultaneously engaging in various extracurricular activities.

From an early age, Dias displayed a profound passion for singing. She eagerly attended khell tiatrs and memorized the lyrics after a single hearing. In 1962, she embarked on her journey as a vocalist for the band Cuckoo, establishing herself as both an actor and singer in the realm of tiatr. Upon her family's return to Goa, Dias seized the opportunity to sing for the band Cuckoo and actively performed as a crooner at weddings and other social events for nearly three years. As an avid listener of songs aired on the radio, she frequently requested the chance to sing on stage whenever a music band was performing at a wedding. Her requests were consistently honored. One such occasion proved pivotal when Joaquim Fernandes, the leader of the Cuckoo Band and a trumpeter, heard Dias' captivating voice and promptly invited her to join as a crooner. This marked a significant turning point in her life.

During her school years, Dias attracted the attention of Dominic Vaz, a tiatrist from Fatrade, and two of his companions. They approached Dias' mother seeking permission for her to act in a tiatr. Notably, they offered transportation for Dias and her mother to attend the shows and return home-an uncommon gesture in those times.

== Career ==
In 1964, Dias made her debut on the Konkani stage in the tiatr Sukhti Kedna? (When is the low tide?). Her performance was warmly received by Dominic Vaz and S. L. D'Costa, who welcomed her into the theater community. Dias showcased her talent with a solo performance titled "Sakrament," which was executed with style and earned her an enthusiastic encore. While she initially felt somewhat uneasy about performing romantic scenes, Dias took pride in receiving a cash prize of ₹100 (equivalent to ₹7,300 or US$77 in 2023) for her solo. Her debut paved the way for numerous acting opportunities.

Antonio Sinforiano, a Konkani writer, director, and prompter, played a crucial role in Dias' career. He not only encouraged her but also facilitated her participation in various tiatrs directed by other tiatr figures. This significant support significantly contributed to Dias' growth as an actress. During that era, female representation on stage was scarce, with only a few notable exceptions such as Josephine Dias, Isalita, Sabina Fernandes, and Anita.

Dias' prior experience and confidence as a performer enabled her to excel on the Konkani stage. Over time, she collaborated with John Claro, who introduced her in his tiatr Gupit Karann (Secret Reason). This opportunity led to her first trip to Bombay, where she portrayed the character of a sister alongside Josephine. Subsequently, Vitorin Pereira extended a warm welcome to Dias in his tiatr Upkari, which was staged at the prestigious Bangwadi Hall in Bombay.

Dias went on to work with Konkani directors such as Mike Mehta, C. Alvares, Prem Kumar, Patrick Dourado, Ligorio Fernandes, Jacinto Vaz, Nelson Afonso, C. D'Silva, John Claro, Aristides Dias, Anil Pednekar, Jack Rodson, Salvador Afonso, Tony Dias, Samuel Carvalho, Mini Mario, and many others. In C. Alvares' tiatr Dr. Simon, she portrayed the role of a mother. Additionally, she showcased her comedic talents alongside esteemed Konkani actors M. Boyer and Jacinto Vaz. Despite initial reservations from traditional tiatr enthusiasts, the introduction of non-stop drama proved to be a success, resonating well with audiences. Dias subsequently joined the A. Moraes troupe and later became part of the Roseferns troupe.

In 1980, Thapott (The Slap), a theatrical production, garnered considerable acclaim, accumulating over 100 successful performances. During this period, Dias became an integral member of the troupe, remaining devoted to their endeavors for a span of 22 years. Within the group, Dias cherished the profound sense of camaraderie, reminiscent of a tightly knit family. She found solace in the warm treatment she received from Succorine, the wife of Roseferns, who embraced her as one of their own.

Notably, Dias's personal life intersected with her theatrical pursuits when she married John Dias, an electrician who briefly dabbled in the Konkani stage as a makeup artist. Unfortunately, tragedy struck in 2011 when John died in a motor accident. Following a hiatus, Dias resurfaced in the realm of theater, gracing productions by directors such as Samuel Carvalho, Tony Dias, and Anil Pednekar. After an extensive tenure under a single director, Dias sought to diversify her artistic repertoire and embarked on a new venture, showcasing her theatrical aptitude in two tiatrs directed by Maxie Pereira.

In 2011, Dias delivered a performance in Goodbye, a comedic production penned by Comedian Michael and Samuel Carvalho. In addition to her accomplishments in the dramatic domain, Dias also left a mark in Konkani cinema, appearing in films like Zababdari and Kanteantlem Ful. Furthermore, she lent her talents to radio plays aired on All India Radio and contributed her voice to various audio albums. Through her stage career, Dias not only garnered accolades but also embarked on journeys to Gulf countries and diverse locales within India, expanding her horizons far and wide.

By 2015, Dias found herself increasingly intertwined with Peter/Roshan's dramatic troupe, where she became a known figure. Her association with the troupe commenced three years earlier in the tiatr production titled Novro (The Boyfriend). Similar to her experience with Roseferns' troupe, Dias forged another close-knit bond within the ensemble led by Peter/Roshan. Notably, one of their tiatrs featured a quintet performance known as panchko, which comprised Roshan, Simonica, Felcy, Elvia, and Dias. The audience warmly received this performance, attesting to its resonance and artistic merit. Dias derived immense joy from both singing and acting on the Konkani stage. Although she did not compose her own songs, she reveled in interpreting the compositions of other lyricists. Furthermore, she embraced the challenge of embodying negative characters, relishing the opportunity to showcase her versatility and artistic prowess.

== Select filmography ==
Year	Title	Role	Notes	Ref
2002	Kanteantlem Ful			
2004	Zababdari			

== Selected stage works ==
Year	Title	Role	Notes	Ref
1964	Sukhti Kedna?	Actor/singer	Professional debut	
1972	Gupit Karann	Josephine's sister		
	Upkari			
	Dr. Simon	Mother		
1980	Thapott			
2011	Goodbye			
2015	Novro			
