= A. F. Souza Ferrão =

Indian actor and playwright (1904–1982)

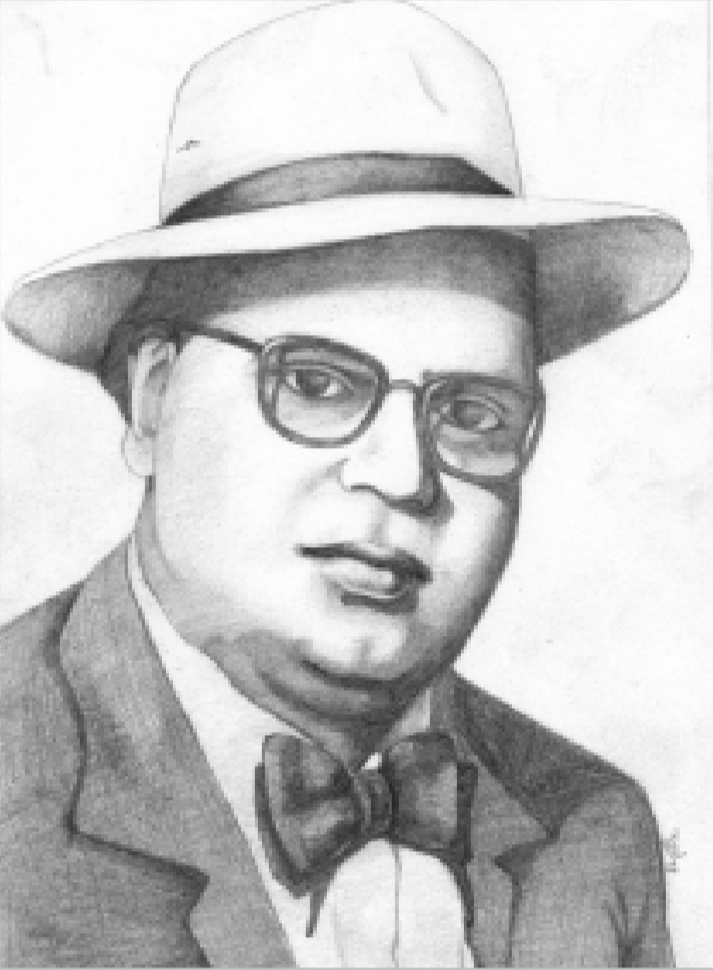
- The only surviving portrait of Ferrão
- Born: Antonio Francisco Souza Ferrão; 5 January 1904; Ambora, Goa, Portuguese India
- Died: 4 December 1982 (aged 78); Curchorem, Goa, India
- Occupations: Actor; playwright; theatre director; businessman
- Years active: 1930s–1960s
- Notable work: Amchem Noxib (1963); Nirmon (1966)
- Spouse: Maria Mascarenhas
- Children: Jack Souza Ferrão
- Relatives: A. R. Souza Ferrão (brother)

Antonio Francisco Souza Ferrão (5 January 1904 – 4 December 1982), known professionally as A. F. Souza Ferrão, was an Indian actor, playwright, theatre director, and businessman known for his work in Konkani films and tiatr productions.

== Career ==
Ferrão, a figure in the realm of Goan tiatr (musical theatre), remains a relatively enigmatic figure with limited available information. However, insights into his life can be gleaned from Konkani singer and writer Sharon Mazarello's literary work in the 2019 book, Tiatr 125th Anniversary Commemorative Volume. According to Mazarello, Ferrão's younger brother, A. R. Souza Ferrão, had already established himself as a tiatrist, primarily known for his acting and playwriting. Together, the brothers formed the Jolly Brothers Dramatic Club, a theatrical group that included the Banda Nacional band, as well as young Goan performers. The members of this group included Miss Julie, a female impersonator, Vincent Rod, Luis Rod, singer and composer Minguel Rod, actors Vaz de Pilerne and Jacinto Vaz, playwright Kid Boxer and Romaldo D'Souza.

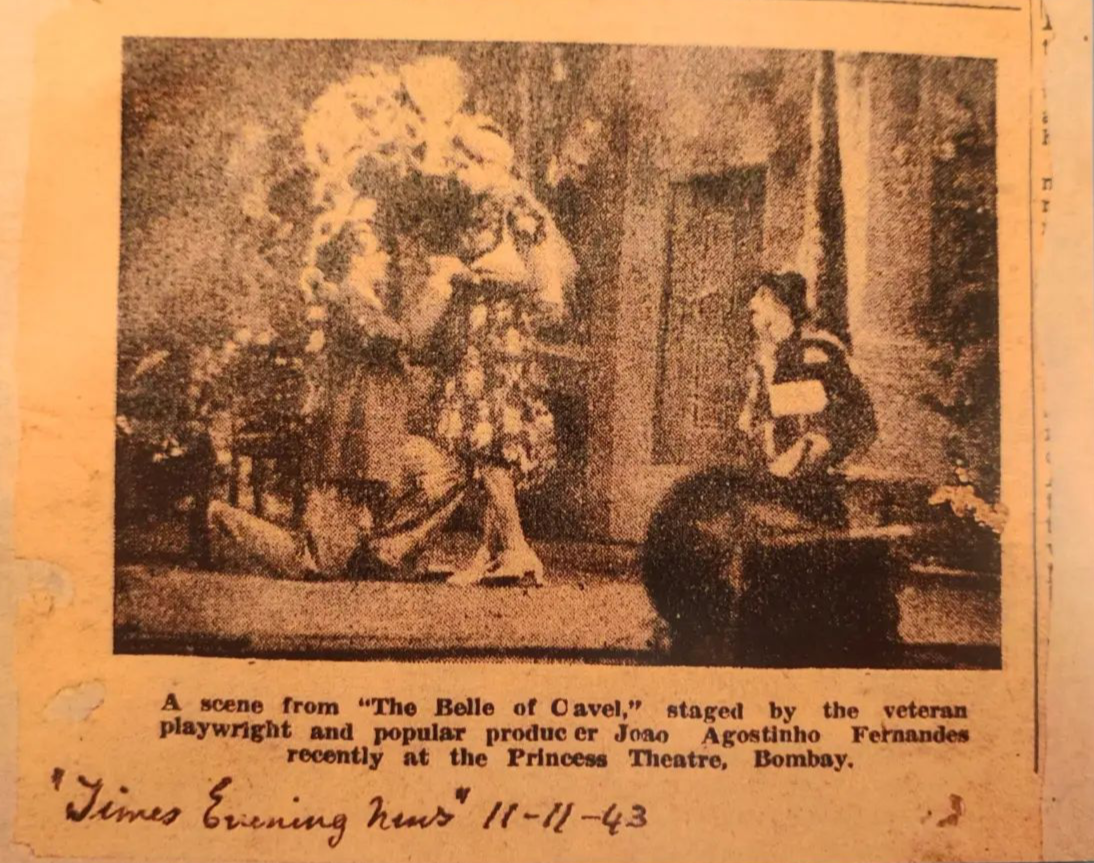

Under the banner of the Jolly Brothers Dramatic Club, Ferrão and his brother collaborated on writing and staging tiatrs, a distinctive form of Goan musical theatre. These productions were performed in both Goa (then part of Portuguese India in the Portuguese Empire) and Bombay (now Mumbai, then part of British India). Ferrão was regarded as a skilled actor and had the opportunity to perform in tiatrs by tiatrist João Agostinho Fernandes, also known as Pai Tiatrist (transl. father of tiatr). Some of Ferrão' performances includes his roles in Cavelchi Sundori (The Belle of Cavel), a tiatr by Fernandes, and Minguel Rod's Ghorchem Kestaum (Family Feud), among others. Ferrão's commanding presence and tall stature often led him to be cast as a bhattkar (transl. landlord) in tiatrs.

Ferrão also wrote and staged his own tiatr called Mojea Bhava (My Brother). Ferrão shared a close association with the Konkani singer and writer Kid Boxer, and the two embarked on a six-month tour to Lourenço Marques, which was then part of Portuguese Mozambique (now Maputo, Mozambique). After returning in 1963, Mojea Bhava was restaged with the participation of Goan artists involved in the tiatr scene. In addition to his contributions to live theatre, Ferrão made cameo appearances in two Konkani films, Amchem Noxib (1963) and Nirmon (1966).

== Personal life ==
Antonio Francisco Souza Ferrão was born on 5 January 1904, in Ambora, Goa, a region that was part of Portuguese India during the Portuguese Empire and is now located in India. His parents were Joaquim Mariano Souza Ferrão (né Souza) and Maria Cecilia Ferrão. Ferrão had a younger brother named Augusto, who had already established himself as an actor and playwright in the Konkani theater. Ferrão resided primarily in the census town of Sanvordem, where he managed his business ventures, including Casa Souza Ferrão and Sofar Sons Engineering. He demonstrated linguistic proficiency by acquiring fluency in three languages: English, Portuguese, and his native language, Konkani, which he studied during his schooling. Ferrão entered into matrimony with Maria Consescao Mascarenhas, and their union resulted in the birth of a son named Joaquim, who, like his father, made contributions to the Konkani stage as an actor and singer. On 4 December 1982, Ferrão died at the age of 78, in the ward of Morailem in Curchorem.

== Filmography ==
Year	Title	Role	Notes	Ref
1963	Amchem Noxib	Cameo role		
1966	Nirmon	Cameo role		

== Selected stage works ==
=== Tiatrs ===
Year	Title	Role	Notes	Ref
1930s/1940s	Cavelchi Sundori	Unnamed role		
	Ghorchem Kestaum	Unnamed role		
	Mojea Bhava	Writer/director		
