= Eddie Mascarenhas =

Indian actor and theatre director (born 1941)

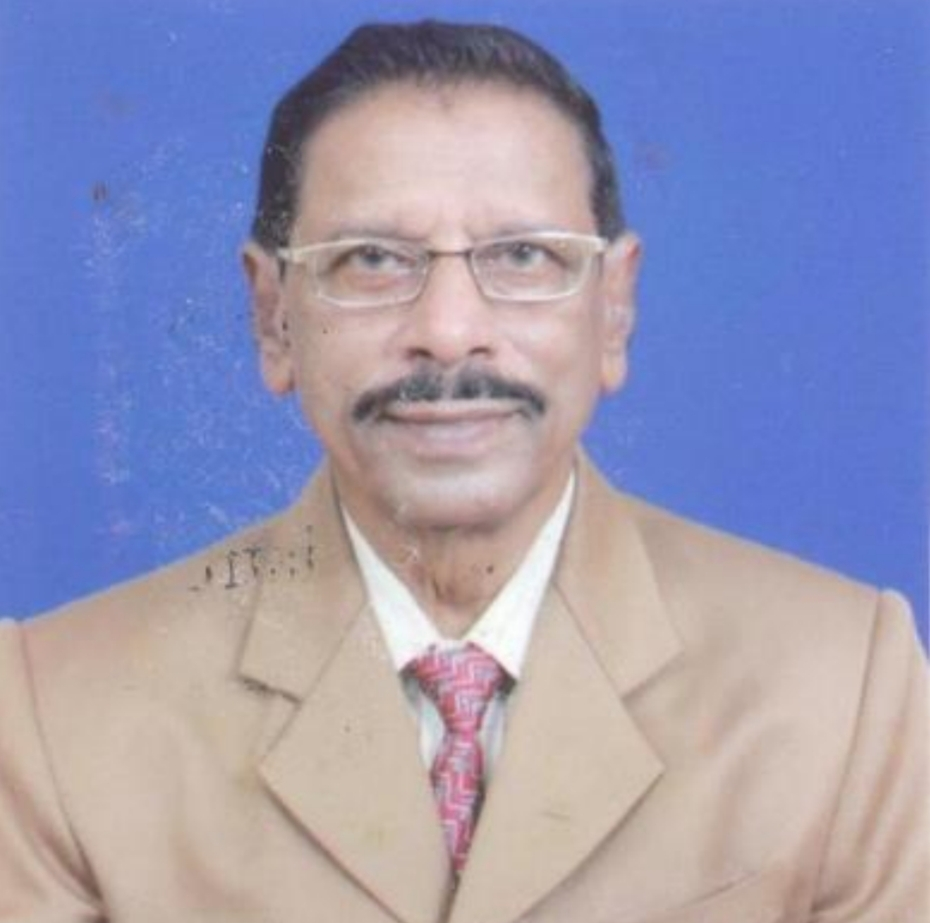
- Mascarenhas in c. 2012
- Born: André Eduardo Roque Mascarenhas; 10 November 1941 (age 84); Calangute, Goa, Portuguese India, Portuguese Empire (now in India)
- Occupations: Actor; director; singer; playwright
- Years active: 1964–2000s

André Eduardo Roque "Eddie" Mascarenhas (born 10 November 1941) is an Indian former theatre actor, theatre director, singer, and playwright who worked on the Konkani stage.

== Early life ==
Mascarenhas's family originated from Dandora in Cuncolim, Goa. During his childhood, Mascarenhas made his initial debut on the tiatr stage. It was at the Colva 'fama' event of Antonio Sinforiano, where Mascarenhas sang a song in Sinforiano' tiatr and received positive feedback from the audience. This marked his entry into the Konkani stage. Mascarenhas's father, Paulino, was a policeman (Polícia do Estado da India), the same as Polícia de Segurança Pública, in the Portuguese regime and had a passion for tiatr, being involved as a tiatrist in villages alongside A. R. Souza Ferrão, among others. Paulino was a singer and actor, primarily participating in local tiatrs. Growing up in Pernem taluka, Mascarenhas resided there for more than 15 years due to his father's occupation as a police officer stationed there. The influence of his father's involvement in the Konkani stage sparked Mascarenhas's own enthusiasm for the tiatr scene, which he pursued further in his career.

Mascarenhas, whose father served in law enforcement, enjoyed the privilege of complimentary tickets to tiatrs, a traditional form of Goan musical theater. Accompanied by his father, he eagerly attended these performances and absorbed the melodic tunes, which he later recited from memory. Mascarenhas developed an affinity for singing, nurtured further by his cousin A. Serrão, a tiatr writer from Colva. Under Serrão's guidance, Mascarenhas was introduced to professional tiatrs by Anton Siforiano at Colva during the Fama event in front of Lakist's house. Actor-singers like Kamat de Assolna, Lucas, his cousin A. Serrão, M. Dod de Verna, and Kid Boxer were part of the performance. Mascarenhas delivered a solo performance featuring a composition by A. Serrão, which Mascarenhas delivered with skill and received acclaim from the audience. Mascarenhas was a mere 15 years old at the time. Subsequently, he enrolled at Guardian Angel High School in Sanvordem, a boarding school, where he actively participated in a myriad of school concerts and events, showcasing his vocal prowess.

Mascarenhas exhibited a penchant for truancy during his school years, often absconding from classes to attend the tiatrs that were regularly staged in and around Sanvordem. This period coincided with the tenure of Fr. Pinto as the school principal. It was during this time that Mascarenhas honed his skills in song composition within the school's premises. His artistic prowess eventually garnered attention when he was residing in Pernem, in a fortuitous turn of events, he was invited to perform at the Saude Saibin's feast (commemorating Our Lady of Health) in Cuncolim on 2 February. Mascarenhas enthralled the audience with two original compositions, both of which resonated and achieved acclaim. Mascarenhas talent captured the interest of Albuquerque and received the endorsement of Randolf. While residing in Pernem, Mascarenhas actively participated in the competitive singing contests held during the tiatr production titled Rinnkari, orchestrated by Diogo Cardozo. This event attracted a constellation of professional singers and actors, including M. Boyer. Demonstrating vocal prowess, Mascarenhas emerged victorious, clinching the first prize for solo singing, which was bestowed upon him by M. Boyer himself. This triumph propelled Mascarenhas into the limelight, securing invitations to perform in a myriad of tiatrs across the locales of Pernem, Arambol, Corgao, Deussua, Mandrem, and Morjim.

== Career ==
Mascarenhas's career spanned multiple years, and made significant contributions to the tiatr stage in both Goa and the Gulf region. He first ventured into the Gulf countries when he secured employment in Dubai, where he established a base for his artistic pursuits. Despite his professional commitments, he continued to actively participate in tiatr performances, showcasing his versatile talents as an actor and singer. However, his appearances on the Konkani stage in Goa were relatively limited during his vacations back home. Before his tenure in Dubai, Mascarenhas had already left a mark on the tiatr scene in Goa and Bombay. He had been involved in various theatrical endeavors and had garnered recognition for his contributions. His dedication to the art form remained firm, and as of 2013, he has consistently engaged in activities associated with tiatrs and the Tiatr Academy of Goa (TAG) whenever his schedule permits. Furthermore, Mascarenhas has showcased his artistic prowess by writing and directing three original tiatrs: Moipaxi Bhav, Bhaunnam (Feelings), and Mogak Lagon (Because of Love). These productions reflect his creative vision and have garnered acclaim within the tiatr community. During his formative years, Mascarenhas resided in the Pernem taluka, where his father, a police officer (Polícia do Estado da Índia), similar to Polícia de Segurança Pública), in the Portuguese administration, was stationed. It was during this period that Mascarenhas collaborated with local boys and girls to create his tiatr Moipaxi Bhav, a production that was well received by audiences and further solidified his passion for the art form.

In 1964, the theatrical production known as Moipaxi Bhav premiered in the Hamal locality. Under the direction of Mascarenhas, a cast of popular professional singers including the trio Anthony-Nelson-Conception, Sabina Fernandes, Champion Peter, and Avelino Lemos brought the performance to life. The success of Moipaxi Bhav spurred Mascarenhas to write and stage two more tiatrs Mogak Lagon, which was showcased in Baida, Pernem, and 'Bhavnnam, presented in Dandora, Cuncolim. In the same year in 1964, Mascarenhas journeyed to Bombay, where he seized an opportunity to showcase his singing prowess in Robin Vaz's tiatr, Shantichem Login (Shanti's Marriage). During his time in Bombay, Mascarenhas participated in a tiatr organized by the Cuncolim Union, with Robert Mascarenhas as the writer and John Gomes Kokoy assisting in the direction. It was during this collaboration that Mascarenhas and John Gomes formed a musical duo, captivating audiences with their performances. Their partnership endured for several projects, collaborating with popular directors such as Carmo Rod, Prem Kumar, Anthony De Sa, and Robin Vaz. After establishing his reputation in both Goa and Bombay over a number of years, Mascarenhas shifted his focus to future work opportunities. He then chose to pursue employment in Dubai in 1974 by taking the Gulf route. Even in Dubai, Mascarenhas continued to immerse himself in theatrical pursuits, ensuring his involvement in the world of tiatrs.

Mascarenhas's artistic journey in Dubai intersected with several influential figures, most notably Joe Frank and Osvi Viegas. Their paths converged during their employment in Dubai, where they discovered a shared passion for tiatr, a traditional form of Goan musical theater. Osvi Viegas was employed at the Hilton Hotel in Dubai. This encounter led to the formation of a trio, dedicated to participating in tiatr productions staged in Dubai. Mascarenhas and Joe Frank, both musicians, assumed the responsibility of composing the trios for these productions, showcasing their talent and creativity. Their collaborative efforts yielded good results and garnered acclaim. They were invited to perform a duet in the Mangalorean tiatr Munxeponn (Humanity), directed by Lawrence and accompanied by the music of Chris Perry. This performance further solidified their reputation as versatile artists. Mascarenhas's artistic endeavors expanded beyond collaborative efforts, as he actively engaged in various tiatrs during his time in Dubai. Displaying his versatility, he portrayed a Hindu character and showcased his vocal prowess in Honrad Goenkar (Honourable Goan), a tiatr by C. Alvares that was staged in Dubai. Additionally, Mascarenhas demonstrated his acting abilities in Menino de Bandar's Florian Vaz Poilo Martir (Floriano Vaz, First Martyr). His vocal contributions extended to other productions, including C. Alvares' Xezari Kombo (Neighbour's Rooster) and a tiatr staged by Aleixinho De Candolim's son Rosario, titled To Bautto Dhormancho and Mhozo Ghov Basurkar (My Husband from Basur). Driven by their creative aspirations, Mascarenhas and his associates embarked on the production of their own tiatrs. They staged two original productions: Jimmy, written by Osvi Viegas, and Gorib Ghorabo (Poor Family), penned by Joe Frank.

Mascarenhas's trio achieved significant acclaim during their career and played a prominent role in the music landscape of Dubai. Prior to their relocation, Mascarenhas had established a reputation as a preeminent Konkani solo singer before 1974, displaying vocal prowess in both solo and duet performances. However, it was upon settling in Dubai that Mascarenhas soared to new heights as a trio singer, garnering recognition. He demonstrated his lyrical prowess by composing his own songs, which contributed to his seamless performances. Mascarenhas collaborated with several Konkani stage playwrights and directors, earning their high regard and admiration. Known for his deep understanding of the early era of tiatr-a popular form of Goan musical theater he is regarded as an authoritative figure in the field, possessing a wealth of knowledge. In recognition of his contributions, Mascarenhas was selected as a distinguished tiatr personality and invited to partake in the prize distribution ceremony at the 2013 fourth Tiatr Festival, held at Ravindra Bhavan in Margao. He was subsequently honored once again as one of the senior tiatr personalities chosen to present awards at the 2015 Tiatr Academy of Goa (TAG)'s Festival of Khells, held at Ravindra Bhavan in Curchorem, Goa.

== Personal life ==
As of 2013, Mascarenhas, due to age and health reasons, has withdrawn from the Konkani stage performances and now predominantly stays at his residence in Fatorda, Goa. He possesses a bungalow in the same area. Mascarenhas has a keen interest in collecting vintage tiatr memorabilia like old photos, handbills, awards, and other artifacts associated with tiatr. These items typically depict 20th-century Konkani tiatrists and their performances, providing insights into this traditional art form. Writer Daniel F. de Souza has acknowledged the significance of Mascarenhas' collection in preserving the heritage of Konkani tiatr. Despite his deep knowledge of tiatr, Mascarenhas is known for his reserved nature, speaking sparingly. As of 2018, he resides near JJ Costa Hospital in Fatorda, Goa.

=== The cobra incident ===
Mascarenhas and his acquaintances embarked on a journey to Baida, a locality situated in Pernem, with the purpose of participating in a singing competition. Demonstrating his vocal prowess, Mascarenhas emerged triumphant, securing the first prize in the form of a trophy. The competition unfolded amidst a forested enclave characterized by undulating terrain. To reach the venue, known as the mattou (pandal), Mascarenhas and his companions traversed the hilly landscape on foot. Upon earning the accolade, they reconvened near the road, anticipating the arrival of their designated vehicle for transportation. While awaiting transportation, Mascarenhas, clutching his trophy, sought respite by reclining on the ground. A cobra stealthily approached him, encircling the trophy atop his chest before slithering across and proceeding towards its intended destination. Stirred from his slumber by the touch of the serpent, Mascarenhas experienced a momentary surge of panic. However, his companions promptly advised him against making any sudden movements to avoid provoking the venomous creature. Complying with their counsel, Mascarenhas remained motionless. As the cobra gracefully traversed his prone form, Mascarenhas found himself overwhelmed by an amalgamation of astonishment, terror, and paralysis.
