= Josephine Dias =

Indian Eucharistic minister and former actress (born 1948)

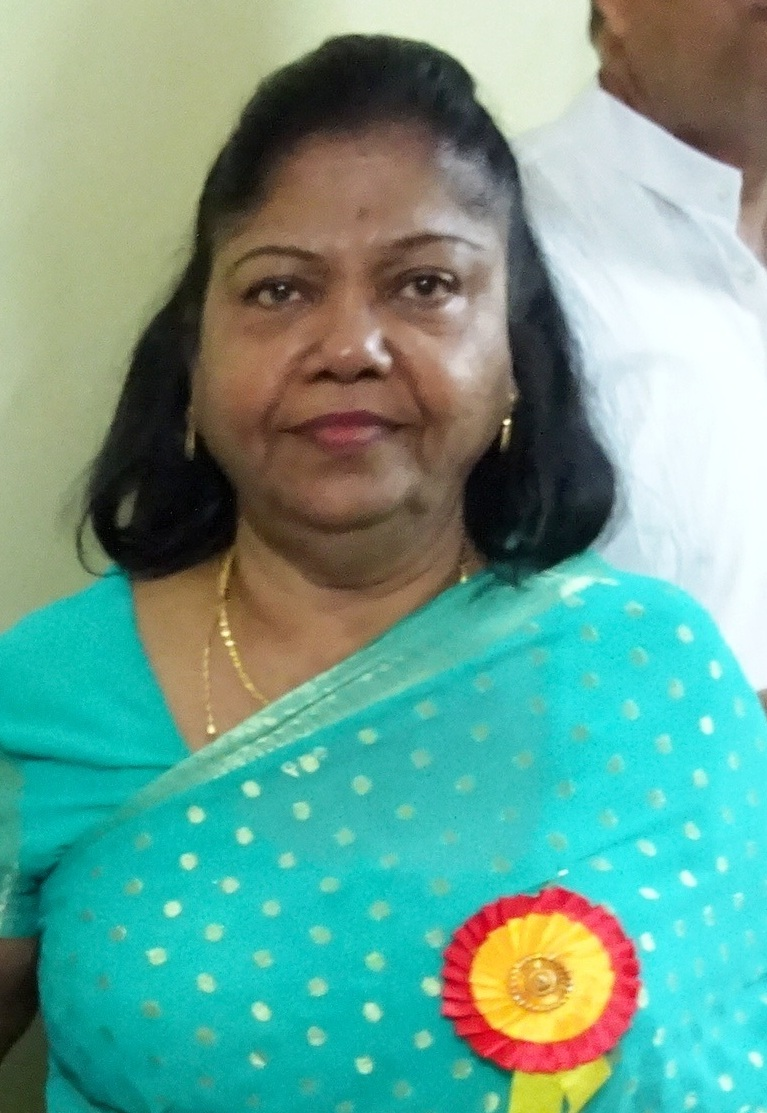
- Dias at Ravindra Bhavan, Margao in 2014
- Born: Josefina Francisca Costa; 19 July 1948 (age 77); Colva, Goa, Portuguese India, Portuguese Empire (now in India)
- Occupations: Actress; singer; Eucharistic minister
- Years active: 1962–2018
- Spouse: Francisco Dias (m. 1971; died 1996)
- Children: 1
- Relatives: Comedian Peter (brother)

Josefina Francisca "Josephine" Dias (née Costa; born 19 July 1948) is an Indian Eucharistic minister, former actress, and singer and who worked on the Konkani stage.

== Early life ==
The Costa family has a background in tiatr, a form of traditional Goan theater, with several family members actively involved as writers and actors. Dias, being the eldest among her six siblings, grew up in an environment immersed in the world of tiatr. Her brothers, including Dioginho, the late Camilo, Joaquim, Peter, and David, were all performers in the Konkani theater scene, contributing significantly to its growth.

Both Joaquim and David made contributions through their acting and singing, while Peter showcased his talent as a comedian. The Costa family's artistic heritage from Colva has been preserved and continued through future generations, ensuring a legacy of creativity and talent. From a young age, Dias demonstrated a natural aptitude for acting and singing. She had the opportunity to witness her father's work as he wrote, directed, and performed in tiatrs. Acknowledging her skills and enthusiasm, her father provided her with an opportunity to showcase her talent on the tiatr stage by including her in one of his productions, titled Ti Mhoji Maim (That is my Mother), in 1962. This marked the beginning of Dias's journey as a performer in the tiatr tradition.

== Career ==
Dias embarked on her career in the tiatr industry at a young age, marking the beginning of her theatrical journey. Introduced by her late father, Casiano D'Costa, she made her debut in the tiatr production titled Ti Mhoji Maim (That is my Mother) in 1962. Dias's theatrical prowess captivated audiences and garnered admiration. The assistance and motivation she received from her father were instrumental in her journey to becoming a popular female artist on the tiatr stage. Recognizing Dias's talent, her father played a pivotal role in promoting her career, providing opportunities for her to collaborate with various directors of that era. This led to her active participation in several productions, showcasing her acting skills and versatility. In order to further refine her abilities in both singing and acting, Dias's father cast her in his subsequent tiatr production, Birankul (Terrifying). This experience served as a catalyst for Dias, propelling her into the commercial tiatr scene. She secured a role in the acclaimed tiatr Maim Tum Asli Zalear (Mother, if you were there), directed by Antonio Sinforiano. While Dias portrayed a diverse range of characters throughout her career, she excelled particularly in comedic and semi-comedic roles, finding comfort and success in these performances. Her contributions to the tiatr industry are extensive, encompassing collaborations with Konkani directors such as Minguel Rod, C. Alvares, Jacinto Vaz, Prem Kumar, John Claro, Aristides Dias, Mike Mehta, Christopher, F. Cardozo, and Nelson Afonso.

Dias has made significant contributions to the Konkani theatrical scene. She has garnered acclaim for her performances in various productions by popular writer-directors. Dias showcased her talent in Miguel Rod's tiatrs, namely Lembddo Santan (Santan, the Stooge) and Pobre Fidalgo. Her portrayals also captivated audiences in C. Alvares' productions of Rinn (Debt) and Durig (Wall). Dias's versatility and stage presence were further demonstrated in her collaborations with figures in the Konkani theater. The Konkani showman Prem Kumar cast Dias in the plays Mortikar (Criminal) and Ordhi Bakri (Half Bhakri), while the Padma Shri awardee M. Boyer featured her in Ekuch Kazar (One Marriage) and Mog Kazar Divorce (Love, Marriage, Divorce). Her performances in these productions received acclaim. Dias demonstrated her acting prowess in multiple tiatrs, including productions like Kuniad ani Mana and Bombay Dekho (See Bombay) by the then-leading Konkani comedian Jacinto Vaz, as well as Divorce and Doya by Aristides Dias.

Moreover, she received acclaim for his roles in Portuguese Kollvont (Portuguese Artist) and Camil Botler by John Claro, where her performances were well received by the audience. In addition to her acting prowess, Dias expanded her artistic horizons by venturing into directing with Tarvotti (Seamen), a play authored by her sibling, Joaquim D'Costa. The theatrical production featured a distinguished ensemble of actors and garnered acclaim, establishing a successful presence in several theatrical venues across Goa. Dias's artistic contributions extended beyond the stage. Dias's music album Pordexi garnered positive reception from listeners, highlighting her musical prowess. Additionally, she contributed her vocals to several Konkani audio albums such as M. Boyer's 25 Vorsam, Steve Rod's Goemcho Fuddar, Socorro de Santa Cruz's No Time, and Jr. Rod's Kid-Young-Rod, among other works. Throughout her career, Dias frequently collaborated with Jr. Rod, resulting in captivating duets and memorable performances. Her on-screen appearances encompassed video albums such as David Costa's Maimcho Upkar and M. Boyer's Tiatrist. Dias's talents have taken her on tours across India, including cities such as Mumbai, Pune, Karwar, Sawantwadi, and Malvan.

Additionally, throughout her career, Dias has collaborated with Konkani directors such as Anil Kumar, Wilson Mazarello, Seby Coutinho, Jephsis Hitler, Rico Rod, Menino de Bandar, Alfred Rose, C. D'Silva, Dioginho D'Costa, Joaquim D'Costa, Mariano Fernandes, Jerry Rodrigues, Greg de Candolim, Felcy, Premanand Lotlikar, Star of Curtorim, and F. X. Dias, among other figures from previous eras of tiatr. Dias's artistic range extends beyond traditional tiatr productions, as she has also graced the stage in Passion plays during the sacred season of Lent. She made a contribution to the Lenten presentation known as Via Dolorosa. Furthermore, Dias has showcased her vocal talents through collaborative ventures, featuring prominently on audio cassettes by acclaimed artists such as Jr. Rod, Felcy, F. Cardozo, Socorro de Santa Cruz, and Aniceto. Her performances have also been captured on VCDs produced by her brother Comedian Peter, David, M. Boyer, and Casino. It is worth noting that Dias's husband, F. X. Dias, wrote and directed the tiatr production Morna Uprant (After Death), in which she displayed her acting prowess. Dias's versatility as an artist is evident in her ability to embrace diverse roles, although she particularly excels in comedic and semi-comedic performances. Her portrayals of Kunbi women have garnered acclaim and admiration from the Goan community. Known for her meticulous approach, Dias diligently immerses herself in the study and understanding of her characters before bringing them to life on stage. Moreover, Dias has garnered international recognition as a tiatrist, having showcased her talents in various productions worldwide, including works by M. Boyer, Aristides Dias, John Claro, Prem Kumar, and others.

Dias gained acclaim for her vocal abilities and stage presence. She frequently collaborated with Jr. Rod, forming a highly regarded duo that garnered praise from tiatr enthusiasts. Their performances were often met with applause and requests for encores, testament to the quality of their musical partnership. Dias's influence extended beyond live performances, as she made contributions to the realm of audio recordings, achieving success in the marketplace. She not only lent her voice to several Konkani audio albums but also ventured into music production by releasing her own successful cassette titled Pordexi. This venture proved to be a commercial success, resonating with a wide audience and establishing Dias as a versatile artist in both live and recorded formats. In addition to her musical endeavors, Dias showcased her acting talents on an international scale. She embarked on tours to countries such as Kuwait, Bahrain, UAE, Oman, Muscat, Dubai, and Abu Dhabi, where she participated in tiatrs written and directed by playwrights and directors. Minguel Rod, C. Alvares, Prem Kumar, John Claro, Jacinto Vaz, M. Boyer, Aristides Dias, Mike Mehta, Anil Kumar, Wilson Mazarello, Seby Coutinho, Jephsis Hitler, Rico Rod, Nelson Afonso, Menino de Bandar, Alfred Rose, C. D'Silva, F Cardozo, and Menino De Bandar are just a few of the individuals with whom she collaborated, contributing to the tapestry of the tiatr tradition. Dias's artistic legacy endures through her extensive discography. Her voice graces over 70 Konkani audio albums, and her songs continue to resonate with audiences, even after all these years. Collaborating with Konkani producers such as Felcy, F. Cardozo, Socorro de Santa Cruz, and Aniceto further solidified her position as a vocalist in the tiatr industry.

On 19 July 2018, a book titled Mogan Morn was revealed to honor Dias's 70th birthday. Authored by her late husband, F. X. Dias, the book is a romantic novel written in Romi Konkani. The unveiling ceremony took place at the Santa Cruz Church Hall in Santa Cruz, Goa, and was graced by the presence of Dias's son, Arvind, and daughter-in-law, Tania. As of 2018, Dias has taken a sabbatical from her involvement in tiatrs, a form of Goan theatrical performances, and has redirected her focus towards active participation in church-related endeavors. In her religious capacity, she is responsible for administering the Eucharist and holds a position on the church parish council. Moreover, Dias leads the Charismatic Renewal group at the Santa Cruz parish. Her tenure as a leader in the Charismatic Renewal group spans nearly a decade, while her service as a Eucharistic minister at the Santa Cruz Church has persisted for 19 years. As an actress, Dias exhibited versatility and proficiency in adapting to diverse roles. She particularly enjoyed portraying character-driven roles, exemplifying her passion for the craft. In May 2018, Dias delivered a memorable performance in Sharon Mazarello's tiatr production titled Tukai Tench Assa, captivating the audience with her talent. Consequently, directors expressed their desire to witness Dias's return to the theatrical stage. On 19 July 2023, as part of the celebration of Dias's 75th birthday, a novel named Ema...the mystery girl was released. Penned by her late husband, F. X. Dias, in 1995, the novel falls within the genre of romance. As a gesture of goodwill, the novel was distributed free of charge to the attending audience.

== Personal life ==
She has a son who is a part of the Tiatr Academy of Goa. Following her marriage to Francisco, Josephine has resided in Rego Bagh, situated in Santa Cruz, Goa. She actively participates in the Catholic community and has been engaged in various activities organized by her local parish church since the early 2000s. While her appearances on the tiatr stage have been relatively infrequent in the early 2010s, she continues to demonstrate her involvement in tiatrs performed during the annual church feasts in her locality, as reported by the media.
