= Antonio Sinforiano =

Indian playwright and prompter (1930–1981)

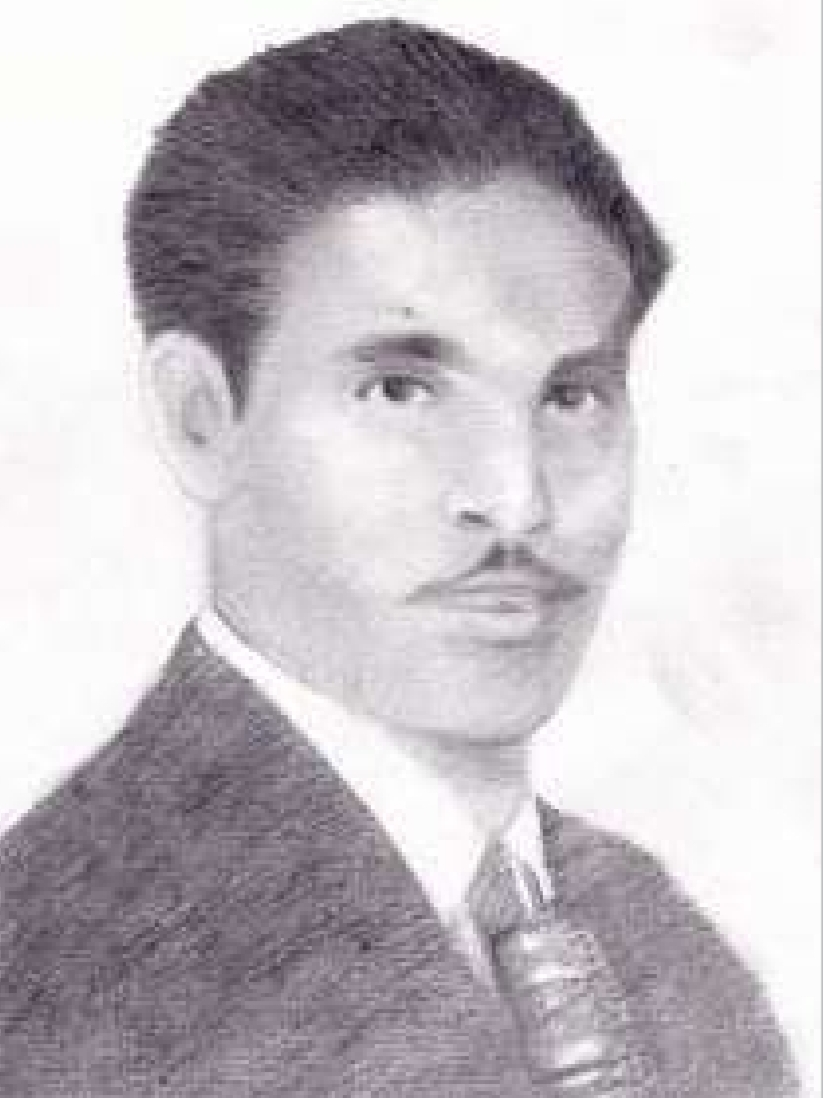
- Portrait of Fernandes during his youth
- Born: Antonio Sinforiano Timotio Luis Fernandes; 22 August 1930; Navelim, Goa, Portuguese India, Portuguese Empire (now in India)
- Died: 11 March 1981 (aged 50); Varca, Goa, India
- Other names: A. Sinforiano; Sinforiano Fernandes
- Education: Segundo Grau (Portuguese)
- Occupations: Playwright; theatrical producer; ghostwriter; theatre prompter; stagehand
- Years active: 1960s–c. 1981

Antonio Sinforiano Timotio Luis Fernandes (22 August 1930 – 11 March 1981), known professionally as Antonio Sinforiano or A. Sinforiano, was an Indian playwright, theatrical producer, ghostwriter, composer, prompter, and stagehand known for his work in tiatr productions staged post-liberation.

== Early life ==
Antonio Sinforiano Timotio Luis Fernandes was born on 22 August 1930 in Navelim, Goa, which was part of Portuguese India during the Portuguese Empire, to landlords Conceiçaõ Manoel Fernandes and Maria Santana Graciana Josefa Rebelo, who hailed from Varca, Goa, into a Goan Catholic family. Fernandes was the fourth of four children, with his elder brothers Gabriel (born 1923) and Jeronimo "Jerry" (born 1926), and a sister Maria (born 1928). After finishing his education at a religious school, Fernandes continued his studies in Margão, where his parents lived. He successfully completed his High School education, known as Segundo Grau, in the Portuguese language.

== Career ==
Fernandes, known for his intellectual prowess and accessibility, was regularly sought out by folk playwrights and tiatrists (artists specializing in tiatr performances) to assess and provide feedback on their scripts. This interaction sparked his interest in tiatr, a distinctive form of Goan musical theater. Consequently, Fernandes initiated his involvement in tiatr by authoring scripts, crafting songs, and offering ghostwriting services to tiatrists, demonstrating his multifaceted contributions to the theatrical landscape. Driven by his passion for tiatr, he immersed himself in the world of theatrical productions, taking on the tasks of a prompter and backstage assistant, embodying the role of a stagehand in the theater environment. Fernandes remained dedicated to the Konkani theater scene, commonly referred to as the tiatr stage, by independently creating and presenting his own tiatrs as a theatrical producer. Among his popular works were Rozarachem Kont (The Rosary Beads), directed by Konkani singer and writer Kid Boxer, Maim, Tum Asli Zalear (Mother, If You Were There), Oso Cholta Ho Sounsar (This Is How the World Works), Disop Vortounam Zavop, Map Bhortoch Vot'ta, and others. On 5 November 1972, Fernandes presented his self-written and directed tiatr, Boreponn (Goodness), near Nuvem church. The staging of this tiatr production was made possible with the assistance of the Santos Sports Club. The cast included Babina, Luiza, Clara Dias, Jephsis Hitler, Lucian, Greg de Candolim, Valento Luis Rod, C de Sanquelim, Roam-Rem-Rod, Domnic Vaz, Lume Gomes, C. D'Silva, Master Vaz, Albert de Cana, and J X Miranda. Luciano served as the stage manager, while the music arrangements were executed by Alex's band.

During the period in which Fernandes was active, the Konkani tiatr stage saw a significant reliance on prompters for the delivery of dialogues by performers. These prompters, including Fernandes, were engaged by directors and played a vital role in the production process. Their primary responsibility was to provide timely cues to the performers, ensuring that the lines were delivered accurately and on time. Prompters like Fernandes possessed the ability to convey the precise emotional nuances required for each character, enhancing the overall performance. The demand for prompters of Fernandes' caliber was substantial, and directors would secure their services well in advance, starting from the rehearsal stage and continuing throughout the entire duration of the performances. Fernandes and his contemporaries frequently traveled with the tiatr troupes, joining them as they performed in diverse locations. In addition to their prompting duties, prompters often provided valuable input by offering suggestions and making necessary corrections to the dialogues. The role of prompters extended beyond dialogue delivery. In addition to overseeing the tiatr program, they were in charge of managing stage transitions, coordinating the availability of props, and other essential elements necessary for a successful tiatr performance. Their meticulous attention to detail and careful approach were instrumental in ensuring the smooth and seamless execution of the tiatr show. What made Fernandes stand out among other prompters was his versatility as a writer and composer. In addition to his prompter responsibilities, he possessed the talent to create original content and compose music for the tiatr.

Fernandes played a significant role in fostering and promoting emerging talents within the Konkani tiatr community. One notable individual he supported was Clara Dias, an actress and singer who made her debut on the Konkani stage during the early 1960s. Fernandes offered her encouragement and guidance during the early stages of her career. Moreover, he actively sought to introduce promising artists in his own theatrical productions. For instance, he provided a platform for Josephine Dias, daughter of playwright Casiano, to make her first appearance on the commercial tiatr stage in the 1960s with the production Maim Tum Asli Zalear (Mother, If You Were There). Fernandes also played a pivotal role in providing opportunities for aspiring tiatr artist Eddie Mascarenhas. In one of his tiatr performances held at the Colva Fama, also known as Fama De Menino Jesus, Fernandes afforded Mascarenhas the chance to showcase his singing talent. Mascarenhas received admiration from the audience for his rendition, effectively launching his career in the Konkani tiatr industry. Furthermore, Fernandes made contributions to the tiatr community beyond his own productions. On 4 February 1967, he assumed the role of a stage manager for the tiatr production Adim Chintunk Nam! (Didn't Think Before). Later in his career, Fernandes became involved in theater competitions, serving as a judge for the Kala Academy Goa's 3rd Tiatr Competition held during the 1976–1977 season. This competition took place across three venues: the Kala Academy Theatre in Panjim, Gomant Vidya Niketan in Margao, and Zopha Mandop in Canacona. Collaborating with judges Krishna L. Moye and Albert Carvalho, Fernandes contributed his expertise to evaluate the performances showcased in the competition.

== Personal life ==
Fernandes was recognized for his erudition and intellectual pursuits. During his formative years, he relocated to Margão, Goa, where he pursued his high school education while residing with his parents. However, at the age of 48, around the year 1978, he decided to leave the city and establish his residence in Varca, Goa, his mother's hometown. Fernandes's older brother, Jeronimo "Jerry," decided to pursue a similar path, starting out as a prompter and backstage assistant before transitioning to become a playwright and director. Additionally, Fernandes's sister-in-law, Filomena Lopes, who entered into matrimony with Jerry, actively participated in the Konkani stage as an actress and singer. After their wedding, she took part in the theatrical performances produced by Fernandes.

According to Fausto V. Da Costa, the author of Tiatr 125th Anniversary Commemorative Volume, Fernandes died on 11 March 1981, at the age of 50, at his residence in Varca. However, a death certificate bearing similarities to Fernandes's and his father's names indicates an alternate account, suggesting that he may have died at the Goa Medical College in Bambolim, Goa. The absence of secondary sources makes it challenging to corroborate this claim. Initially, Da Costa had stated in his writings that Fernandes was born in the village of Varca; however, the birth certificate points to his birthplace as the town of Navelim, Goa. Consequently, uncertainty lingers regarding the precise location of Fernandes's death.
