= A. R. Souza Ferrão =

Indian actor and director (1909–1978)

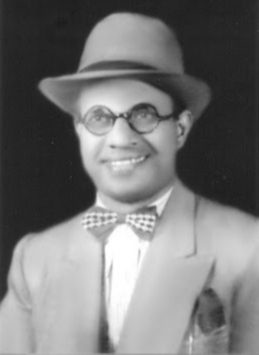
- Portrait of Souza during his youth
- Born: Augusto Remédios Souza; 1 June 1909; Ambora, Goa, Portuguese India, Portuguese Empire
- Died: 6 March 1978 (aged 68); St George Hospital, Bombay, Maharashtra (now Mumbai), India
- Education: J. J. School of Art
- Occupations: Actor; playwright; director; producer; singer; composer
- Years active: 1920s–1977
- Employer(s): The Catholic Education Institute, Margão
- Notable work: Amchem Noxib; Nirmon; Bhuierantlo Munis
- Title: Co-founder of Jolly Brothers Dramatic Club
- Relatives: A. F. Souza Ferrão (brother); Jack Souza Ferrão (nephew)

Augusto Remédios Souza (1 June 1909 – 6 March 1978), known professionally as A. R. Souza Ferrão (or simply Souza Ferrão), was an Indian actor, playwright, theatre director, producer, singer, and composer known for his work in Konkani films and tiatr productions.

== Career ==
Souza's passion for the tiatr stage emerged at an early age. He embarked on his Konkani theater journey with Chinchinim-based Basilio Furtado's tiatr Naddponn Amigachem, portraying the character of Princess Diana at Clube Harmonia Hall in Margão. The success of his performance motivated him to pursue further opportunities on stage. In his initial endeavors, Souza fashioned makeshift stages using benches and improvised curtains made from bedsheets. He commenced his own concerts, held either at his residence or at Erico Barreto's house in Margão. Souza gathered a group of village boys to participate in these intimate concerts, gradually progressing to presenting plays in private homes. He arranged for musicians and petromax lamps, essential elements for the concerts, and made them accessible to the public free of charge. However, during the interval, he would circulate a tray to collect donations to cover the expenses incurred for the musicians and lamps. Despite his involvement in tiatrs from his school days, Souza remained devoted to his studies.

As Souza honed his skills, his talent became known, especially among the people of Margão and its surrounding areas. The news of his abilities reached João Agostinho Fernandes, who, during his visit to Goa, extended an invitation to Souza to take on a leading role in his tiatr Geraldina. This opportunity marked Souza's first major stage performance, which garnered acclaim. The tiatr's success led to its restaging in 1927. Souza's portrayal in the tiatr earned him praise from the Chief Health Officer of Goa. The subsequent staging of the tiatr at Eden Cinema in Pangim attracted a sizable audience, including the Governor of Portuguese India, Pedro Francisco Massano de Amorim. Souza's involvement in Konkani tiatr, however, met with disapproval from his father. In an attempt to divert him from the stage, his father secured a job for him in the Police band. Yet, Souza's declined the offer, despite his father's wishes. He briefly joined the band on two occasions but quickly departed from such service.

Gradually, Souza's reputation as a tiatr director spread, leading to invitations from various villages to direct tiatrs. Although these engagements did not yield substantial monetary gain, Souza eagerly embraced them while continuing his studies. He completed his Segundo Grau (transl. High school) in Portuguese and briefly worked at The Catholic Education Institute in Margão before venturing to Bombay in search of employment. In Bombay, Souza seized opportunities for stage acting, building on his existing connections, particularly with João Agostinho Fernandes. He began acting in Fernandes tiatrs and soon received offers from other directors such as Saib Rocha, J. P. Souzalin, Ernest Rebello, and John Lazarus. Souza's breakthrough came when he assumed a Kunbi character in a tiatr organized to support The Little Flower of Jesus school. Among the audience were individuals like John Lazarus D'Souza, the editor of the Dulestan newspaper, and Luis Borges, a tiatrist. Impressed by Souza's performance, John invited him to act in his upcoming tiatr, while Borges requested his collaboration in duets and English/Konkani solos. This marked the beginning of a series of opportunities for Souza. He was then chosen by the Portuguese Consul to sing Konkani duets with Luis Borges, making them the only two Goan singers in a tiatr directed by Portuguese theatre director Silva Sanches at the Opera House. The performance garnered acclaim, attracting audiences from various states.

Souza gained recognition during the zenith of his acting career as the "Man of Thousand Faces" owing to his versatility and ability to embody diverse roles. In his youth, Souza's desire to act and sing on the Konkani stage was challenged by the scarcity of tiatrs in Goa. The dearth of actors willing to participate in these theatrical productions posed an obstacle, as respectable families were hesitant to allow their children to engage in stage performances. Despite being the son of a musician (khellam mestri) who organized khells in Goa, Souza's father vehemently opposed his son's involvement in the Konkani stage, often resorting to physical coercion in an effort to dissuade him from pursuing tiatrs. However, Souza persisted, enduring physical repercussions for his dedication to drama. Singers of the early era, including Anthony Tulu, exclusively performed duets with Souza. Konkani directors such as Saib Rocha, J. P. Souzalin, Aquila, Rogaciano, Ernest Rebello, John Lazarus, and Affonceka prioritized Souza's participation, ensuring his involvement prior to scheduling their new tiatrs. Driven by his love for the stage, Souza felt compelled to contribute to the enhancement of the quality of Konkani tiatrs. To this end, he founded the Jolly Brothers Dramatic Club, enlisting young boys from Goa. Through this club, Souza organized tiatrs in Goa, often inviting Dioginho D'Mello and Anthony Vaz to partake in his productions. Souza's primary motive for staging tiatrs was not financial gain; in fact, the majority of his productions were dedicated to charitable causes. He willingly lent his talents to assist churches, schools, and hospitals in raising funds through theatrical endeavors. Additionally, Souza derived joy from participating in Goan folk songs and dances, actively engaging in the rich cultural heritage of Goa.

Souza had accompanied various folk-song groups on their tours, showcasing his musical prowess and actively promoting traditional music. In recognition of his talent, Souza was exclusively invited to perform on Republic Day in Delhi in both 1954 and 1955, making him the sole Konkani artist to receive this honor during those years. Under the banner of his troupe, 'The Goan Folk Song and Dance Party, Souza's performances stood out and earned him recognition. His troupe emerged victorious in a competition that featured folk dances from different regions of India, ultimately being adjudged the best among them. Personalities such as the President of India at that time, Dr. Rajendra Prasad, and the Prime Minister of India, Pandit Jawaharlal Nehru, lauded Souza's talent and praised his performances. An important milestone in Souza's career occurred on 11 November 1937, when he made history as the first Konkani artist to present and record a musical program on All India Radio in Bombay. Collaborating with composer Manuel Alphonso, with Souza showcasing his skills as a singer, composer, and lyricist. His proficiency in rendering traditional Kunbi songs, a distinctive genre, became his forte and garnered admiration.

In addition to his achievements in music and theater, Souza made contributions to the Konkani film industry. He appeared in various Konkani films, including Amchem Noxib (1963), Nirmon (1966), Sukhachem Sopon (1967), Mhoji Ghorkarn (1969), Kortubancho Sounsar (1970), Jivit Amchem Oxem (1971), Boglantt (1975), Bhuierantlo Munis (1977), and an Indian documentary in technicolor. A lot of his stage productions were successful, and worked along with Konkani directors such as João Agostinho Fernandes, Saib Rocha, J. P. Souzalin, Ernest Rebello, C. Alvares, M. Boyer, Prem Kumar, and others. In addition to his acting endeavors, Souza showcased his creative abilities by writing eight tiatrs, a popular form of musical theater in Goa. Moreover, he assumed the roles of director and producer for several tiatrs written by various playwrights. Some of his works include Almam Sorgar Vetat, Patch Patch, Kazari Okol, Ghatkeponn, Zotkaxi, Santan Bavddi, Visvasghat, Gouieo Put, and Paichem Farikponn. Many of these productions achieved success and received acclaim from audiences. Throughout his career, Souza embarked on tours with his troupe, in cities such as Bombay, Poona, Ahmedabad, Goa, and even East Africa. He also had a talent for writing lyrics, having created several musical compositions. Some examples include "Vauraddi," "Sorg Tujea Dolleamni," "Sintidan Paim Ghal Re Jaki," and "Ami Xet Roilam."

== Style and reception ==
Wilson Mazarello, a historian and singer in the Konkani community, expresses his surprise at Souza who had authored a mere eight tiatrs, a popular form of Goan musical theater. Despite this seemingly modest output, Souza managed to carve out a significant place for himself in the Konkani stage, alongside figures such as J. P. Souzalin and Aleixinho De Candolim. While J.P. Souzalin and Alexinho de Candolim were celebrated for their talents as writer-directors, Souza garnered admiration from tiatr audiences for his skills in singing, composing, acting, and musical proficiency. Souza's presence on the Konkani stage was met with great enthusiasm, and his performances in any role were eagerly anticipated and appreciated by tiatr goers. Through his contributions, Souza elevated the status and reputation of the Konkani stage, instilling a sense of refinement and dignity that set it apart from the traditional zagors in which Goans typically engaged, as noted by Mazarello. According to André Raphael Fernandes, a professor at Goa University, Souza's true talent lay not in prolific writing, but in his ability to embody a wide range of characters. He effortlessly portrayed heroes, Hindus, Goan tribal Kunbis, Arabs, old men, and even flirtatious young girls, showcasing his versatility and skill on stage.

Irene Cardozo, a writer, underscores Souza's versatility as an actor, asserting that he seemingly possessed the ability to assume nearly any role imaginable. His performances in various tiatrs exemplified his multifaceted nature, as he adeptly portrayed characters spanning Kunbis, bhattkars (landlords), old women, young girls, Hindus, and even unfamiliar roles. Souza's stage presence was captivating, as he immersed himself in each character, delivering performances that resonated with authenticity and skill. His command over Kunbi roles and his mastery of the songs he sang during the tiatrs further exemplified his talent, as highlighted by Cardozo.

== Character assessment ==
Irene Cardozo, a writer, acknowledges the impact of Souza on the tiatr stage. Known for his role in introducing and nurturing young talents, Souza received praise for his recognition and appreciation of their performances. He exhibited dedication to the art form and its artists. Souza's commitment to tiatr was evident in his willingness to endure the challenges of public transportation, particularly at night, as he would traverse long distances while carrying his trunk on his head. Furthermore, his altruistic nature was evident through his provision of accommodation for tiatr artists in his Margão residence and his active involvement in staging tiatrs to raise funds for charitable causes. Souza upheld his principles, as demonstrated by his candid remarks during a meeting at the Dabul Goan Institute, Bombay in 1975, where he criticized the absence of tiatr artists to recognize Konkani as a distinct language by the Sahitya Academy.

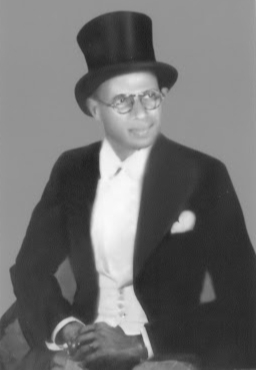
Souza in professional attire

Wilson Mazarello, a Konkani historian and singer, offers further insights into Souza's character. Described as a man of refinement, Souza was consistently seen exuding elegance, often adorning a tie, long-sleeved shirt, and a hat. His gentlemanly demeanor was complemented by his extensive education and his passion for tiatr as an art form. Souza's commitment to his craft was evident in his ability to balance his professional responsibilities as a draughtsman in the Bombay telephone department with his fervent pursuit of tiatr during his free time. Souza's manners and cultured disposition further set him apart from his peers. As an artist, he possessed versatility, assuming diverse roles ranging from bhattkar (landlord) to Kunbi, from young damsels to elderly women, and even portraying characters of different religious backgrounds.

== Analysis of Gouio Put ==
Souza's tiatr Gouio Put (Idiotic Son) is a comedic theatrical production that derives its humor from the manipulation of language and the unfolding of various events. The play explores themes such as marriage, the cleverness of cooks, avarice, and the concept of retribution. Goa University professor André Raphael Fernandes highlights the moral lesson within the play, which revolves around the interpretation of ambiguous phrases in the Konkani language.

== Death ==
On 6 March 1978, Souza died, at the age of 68, in St George's Hospital in Bombay. Tiatrists from Goa, Bombay, and around the globe expressed their reverence and paid their respects upon learning of his death.

== Legacy ==
The Government of India created a documentary called 'The Folk Dances of India', featuring the traditional folk dances of Goa by Souza. In honor of Souza's legacy, his family established the 'A. R. Souza Ferrão Cultural and Charitable Trust' as a public trust.

== Selected stage works ==
| Year | Title | Role | Notes | Ref |
|---|---|---|---|---|
| | Naddponn Amigachem | Princess Diana | Professional debut | |
| 1925 | Geraldina | Lead role | | |
| | Almam Sorgar Vetat | Writer/director | | |
| | Patch Patch | Writer/director | | |
| | Kazari Okol | Writer/director | | |
| | Ghatkeponn | Writer/director | | |
| | Zotkaxi | Writer/director | | |
| | Santan Bavddi | Writer/director | | |
| | Visvasghat | Writer/director | | |
| | Gouieo Put | Writer/director | | |
| | Paichem Farikponn | Writer/director | | |
