= Comedian Peter =

Indian comedian and actor (1957–2010)

- Portrait of da Costa in his later years
- Born: Pedro Menino da Costa; 16 September 1957; Margão, Goa, Portuguese India, Portuguese Empire
- Died: 11 October 2010 (aged 53); Colva, Goa, India
- Burial place: Our Lady of Merces Church cemetery, Colva, Goa, India
- Other names: Peter D'Costa; Peter de Colva
- Occupations: Comedian; actor; composer; playwright
- Years active: 1974–2010
- Spouse: Margarida da Costa (m. 1999)
- Children: 2
- Relatives: Josephine Dias (sister)

Pedro Menino da Costa (16 September 1957 – 11 October 2010), known professionally as Comedian Peter, was an Indian comedian, actor, composer, ghostwriter, playwright, and lyricist known for his work in khell and tiatr productions.

== Early life ==
Pedro Menino da Costa was born on 16 September 1957, in Margão, Goa, which was a part of Portuguese India during the period of the Portuguese Empire. He was born into a Goan Catholic family with a strong connection to the traditional Goan theater known as tiatr. His father, Casiano, hailed from Varca, Goa, while his mother, Maria Santana Joana da Silva, a homemaker, came from Colva, Goa. Tiatr played a significant role in da Costa's family, with several relatives actively involved as writers and actors in this form of entertainment. Notable among his siblings were Dioginho (born 1951), as well as the late Camilo, Joaquim, Josephine Dias, and David, all of whom were performers in the Konkani theater scene. Da Costa's father, not only had a presence as a performer in tiatrs but also made contributions as a playwright and director within the Konkani theater community. His involvement further enriched the family's background in the art form.

== Career ==
Da Costa began his early involvement in the performing arts as a young performer, introduced to the field by his father, Casiano, within the realm of tiatrs, a traditional Goan style of theater. Later on, da Costa shifted to engaging in zomnivoile khell, which are popular street plays found in Goa. He gained recognition for his performances in Shalibai's fells, synonymous with khell productions. In addition to his acting endeavors, da Costa began writing khells and assumed the role of a young mestre, imparting play acts, known as "partio", to a group of aspiring youths from Assolda and Paroda-Quepem on a regular basis. It was through his involvement in A. M. Pacheco's khell-tiatrs, specifically Odruxtt (1974) and Mr. Romeo (1974), that da Costa secured a breakthrough in the commercial theater domain.

Da Costa showcased his versatility as an artist by portraying characters with both comedic and serious undertones, demonstrating his ability to excel in diverse roles across the spectrum of performing arts. He initially emerged as Comedian Peter in A. M. Pacheco's uninterrupted drama Fator (Stone) staged in 1981. Da Costa's comedic prowess shone through his delivery of dialogues and body movements, leaving audiences in fits of laughter. His talent for mimicking prominent personalities from the realms of tiatr, politics, society, and religion further contributed to his acclaim. Throughout his career, da Costa collaborated with popular Konkani directors such as Pascoal Rodrigues, Filipe Almeida Minino Mario, Milagres de Chandor, and F. Cardozo, participating in their respective tiatr productions.

D'Costa was also a popular figure in the realm of tiatr and khell-tiatr, where he left a mark as both a performer and composer. Alongside A. M. Pacheco, he showcased his comedic talent in the works of acclaimed artists such as Premanand Lotlikar, Roseferns, and Christopher-Meena. Da Costa's creative prowess extended to composing the "cantos" (Konkani songs) for Premanand Lotlikar's seven khell-tiatrs, including popular productions such as Loz Ani Dukh (Shame and Sadness), Zindabad (Long Live), To Mhozo Oprad (That is my Fault), and Povitr Papi (Holy Sinner). In A. M. Pacheco's theatrical work Don Roste (Two Roads), da Costa demonstrated his acting range by taking on the character of a police officer, illustrating his ability to excel outside of comedic roles.

Additionally, he exhibited his talent as a writer by creating tiatrs and khell-tiatrs, frequently collaborating with others for their staging and production. However, he independently produced one tiatr, titled Palov. Da Costa's musical aptitude was recognized, particularly his ability to compose songs swiftly. He enhanced his reputation as a songwriter by crafting lyrics for songs and cantos that were utilized by several tiatrists in their performances. His extensive discography included several cassettes, CDs, and VCDs featuring his songs and plays, such as Upkar, Mahatma Gandhi, Circus, Very Good Bhakar, Abhi Tak Zinda Hai, and Teg Bhav Deva Pau. In the production Teg Bhav Deva Pau, da Costa embodied three distinct characters, leaving an impact on fans of tiatr. Da Costa introduced his final album, Peter D'Costa Abhi Tak Zinda Hai, Rok Sakta to Roklo, shortly before his death.

== Personal life ==
Da Costa resided in the fourth ward of Colva, Goa. On 12 May 1999, he entered into a civil marriage with Margarida da Costa, a homemaker originally from Macasana, Goa but born in Benaulim. The civil marriage was officially registered at the Salcete registrar's office. Subsequently, on 17 May, the couple solemnized their marriage with an official church ceremony at Our Lady of Merces Church in Colva, Goa. At the time of their union, da Costa was 41 years old, while Margarida was 33. In addition to his involvement in the Konkani stage, da Costa also had a business venture during this period. Together, he and Margarida had two sons named Marion (born 2005) and Macklin. Da Costa's limited stage presence during the 2000s was attributed to his struggle with a liver ailment that significantly impacted his health. Despite his illness, he remained moderately active and released his final Konkani album titled Peter D'Costa Abhi Tak Zinda Hai Rok Sakta to Roklo one day prior to his demise.

== Death ==
On 11 October 2010, da Costa, aged 53, died at his residence in Colva, Goa. The subsequent day, a funeral service was conducted at Our Lady of Merces Church in Colva, where he was interred.

=== Reactions ===
Theatre director Roseferns, conveyed dismay and grief upon learning about the death of his long-time collaborator, da Costa, who had been an integral part of his professional journey for nearly a decade. Recognized for his expertise in character comedy and impersonation, da Costa earned admiration from Roseferns, who endeavored to showcase his talents effectively during performances. In a candid interview, da Costa expressed appreciation for Roseferns' insights into his comedic strengths, acknowledging the director's understanding of his comedic prowess. Sally, a comedic performer who shared the stage with da Costa in Roseferns' theatrical group, lauded his dedication to his craft and pursuit of artistic perfection. Their strong rapport on stage was evident, and Sally expressed his condolences to da Costa's family.

O Heraldo, a local newspaper, offered its condolences to the bereaved family, recognizing da Costa's.contributions to the field of comedy. The Tiatr Academy of Goa (TAG) also extended its sympathies, acknowledging da Costa as a proficient comedian who added liveliness and entertainment to tiatr performances. TAG highlighted his talent for mimicking famous personalities within the tiatr community, bringing laughter to audiences through his delivery and physicality. The academy lamented the loss of da Costa, describing him as an intelligent comedian who will be deeply missed on the tiatr stage. The sentiments of TAG were conveyed by Tomazinho Cardozo, the then-president of the academy.
