= Eucharistic Minister =

Person who distributes Holy Communion

A Eucharistic minister, also known as a communion steward, is an individual that assists in the distribution of Holy Communion to the congregation of a Christian Church. Eucharistic Ministers may be trained to take the Lord's Supper to those who are homebound, ill, or incarcerated.

== Lutheran Churches ==
A Eucharistic Minister, formally known as a Lay Eucharistic Minister (LEM), denotes a lay person who assists the priest (pastor) in administering the elements of Holy Communion, the consecrated host and wine. Eucharistic Ministers are trained to take the Eucharist to those who are homebound, in the hospital, in the nursing home, or who are incarcerated in prison.

== Anglican and Episcopal Churches ==
The term "Eucharistic Minister", or more properly a "Lay Eucharistic Minister" (LEM), denotes a lay person who assists the priest in administering the elements of Holy Communion, the consecrated bread and wine. They may also take the sacrament to those who are ill, or otherwise unable to attend the church service.

Although the practice varies from diocese to diocese, in general LEMs are recommended by the parish priest to the bishop of the diocese, who grants them a three-year license to practice the ministry. This license is often renewed at the priest's discretion for subsequent three year terms.

== Methodist Churches ==
In many Methodist Churches, communion stewards assist the minister in the distribution of Holy Communion to the congregation during the service. These individuals also aid the minister in consuming any remaining elements after the distribution has been completed, although some of it is reserved to be taken to the sick in hospitals and in their homes.

== Catholic Church ==
Only a validly ordained priest can validly consecrate the Eucharist. As stated in Canon Law, "The ordinary minister of holy communion is a bishop, presbyter, or deacon." and "The extraordinary minister of holy communion is an acolyte or another member of the Christian faithful designated according to the norm of ⇒ can. 230, §3."

"[T]he name “minister of the Eucharist” belongs properly to the Priest alone." That is also specified in the Vatican instruction Redemptionis sacramentum. Section 154 of RS states: "the only minister who can confect the Sacrament of the Eucharist in persona Christi is a validly ordained Priest. Hence the name “minister of the Eucharist” belongs properly to the Priest alone."

The distribution of Holy Communion is done by the priest, often with one or more ministers, depending on the number of people receiving Holy Communion. There are two types of assistants: ordained (ordinary) ministers, and extraordinary ministers. An "Ordinary Minister of Holy Communion" is an ordained bishop, priest, or deacon. See also section 154 of RS. The term "Ordinary" refers to the fact that ordained ministers are the ones who would ordinarily assist in the distribution of Holy Communion. The shortage of ordained ministers, and large numbers of communicants, has led to the practice of deputing lay persons for this function.

An "Extraordinary Minister of Holy Communion" is a Catholic lay person who assists in the distribution of Holy Communion, either during the Mass, or afterwards, such as to housebound persons. Section 156 of RS prohibits the use of other titles for these lay persons.

Section 158 of RS provides instructions on the use of EMHCs: "the extraordinary minister of Holy Communion may administer Communion only when the Priest and Deacon are lacking, when the Priest is prevented by weakness or advanced age or some other genuine reason, or when the number of faithful coming to Communion is so great that the very celebration of Mass would be unduly prolonged."
