= Camurlim =

Camurlim Ambora
- Village
- Location within Goa Location within India
- Coordinates: 15°19′30″N 73°57′10″E
- Country: India
- State: Goa
- District: South Goa
- Taluka: Salcete

Area
  - Total: 3.095 km^{2} (1.195 sq mi)
- Elevation: 11 m (36 ft)

Population (2011)
  - Total: 4,000 (approx.)
  - Density: 1,300/km^{2} (3,300/sq mi)
- Time zone: UTC+5:30 (IST)
- Postcode: 403718
- Area code: 08342

Camurlim, also known as Ambora, is a village in Salcete taluka in Goa, India. It is situated about 45 km south of the lively city of Mapusa, well known for its weekly Friday market.

== Location ==
Camurlim is 12 km (7.5 mi) north of Margao. It is located to the south-west of Raia and to the north-east of Loutolim, 29 km (18 mi) from the state capital Panaji.

== History ==
Camurlim is associated with many stories that highlight its past glory. In one such tale, one part of the village, which was called Diullbhatta, was the designated meeting place of people from Salcete's 60 villages and 10 corporations. Through a series of debates, called sotorbonderachembatta, the 70 people representing each area would decide on important matters.

Another tale shows that to begin the celebrations of Konsachem Fest (harvest feast) on August 5, the parish priest of the Our Lady of Snows Church in Raia could only cut the first bundle of rice only after Camurlim village had done so.

Sonfator, Naquelim, Dollanvaddo, Nirboga vaddo, Uzro, Gavon, Tembia, Dongri, Kurgutti, Zorivaddo, Kulsabhatt, etc are the various wadde (wards) of the village.

== Demographics ==
According to the 2011 Census, Camurlim has a population of about 2300, with 5% belonging to the Scheduled tribes. About 35% of the population belongs to the working class. Most of the villagers are Christians and are of the chardo (kshatriya) caste. The eight vangores (clans) of the village are Antao, Mascarenhas, Sousa, Dias, Carvalho, Quadros, Fernandes and Cardozo.

== Attractions ==
- Our Lady of Candelaria Church and Chapel
- Ambora and Uzro zora (springs)

== Notable residents ==
- Felicio Cardozo - journalist and editor of the publication Goencho Saad

== Gallery ==
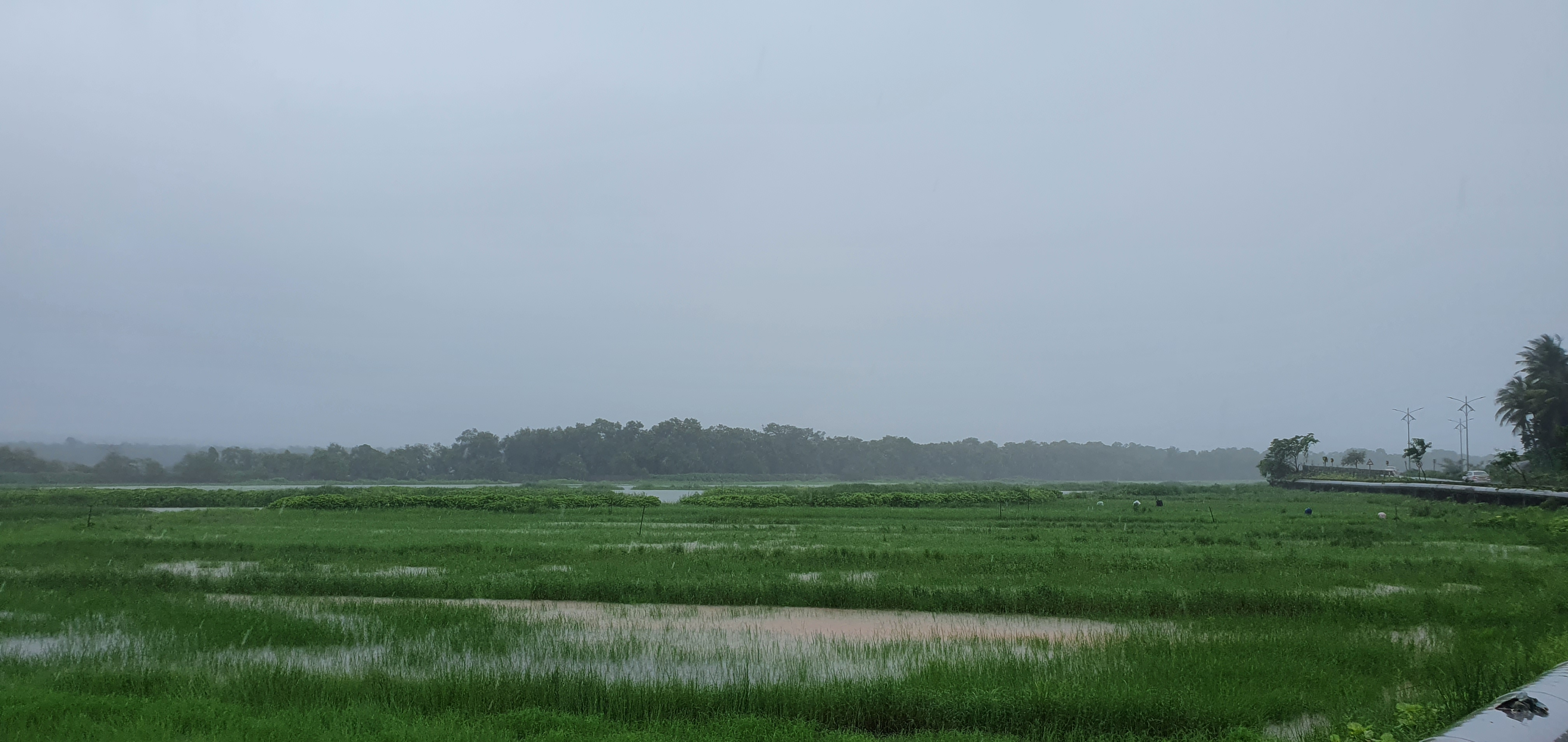
Camurlim Fields from NH17 road

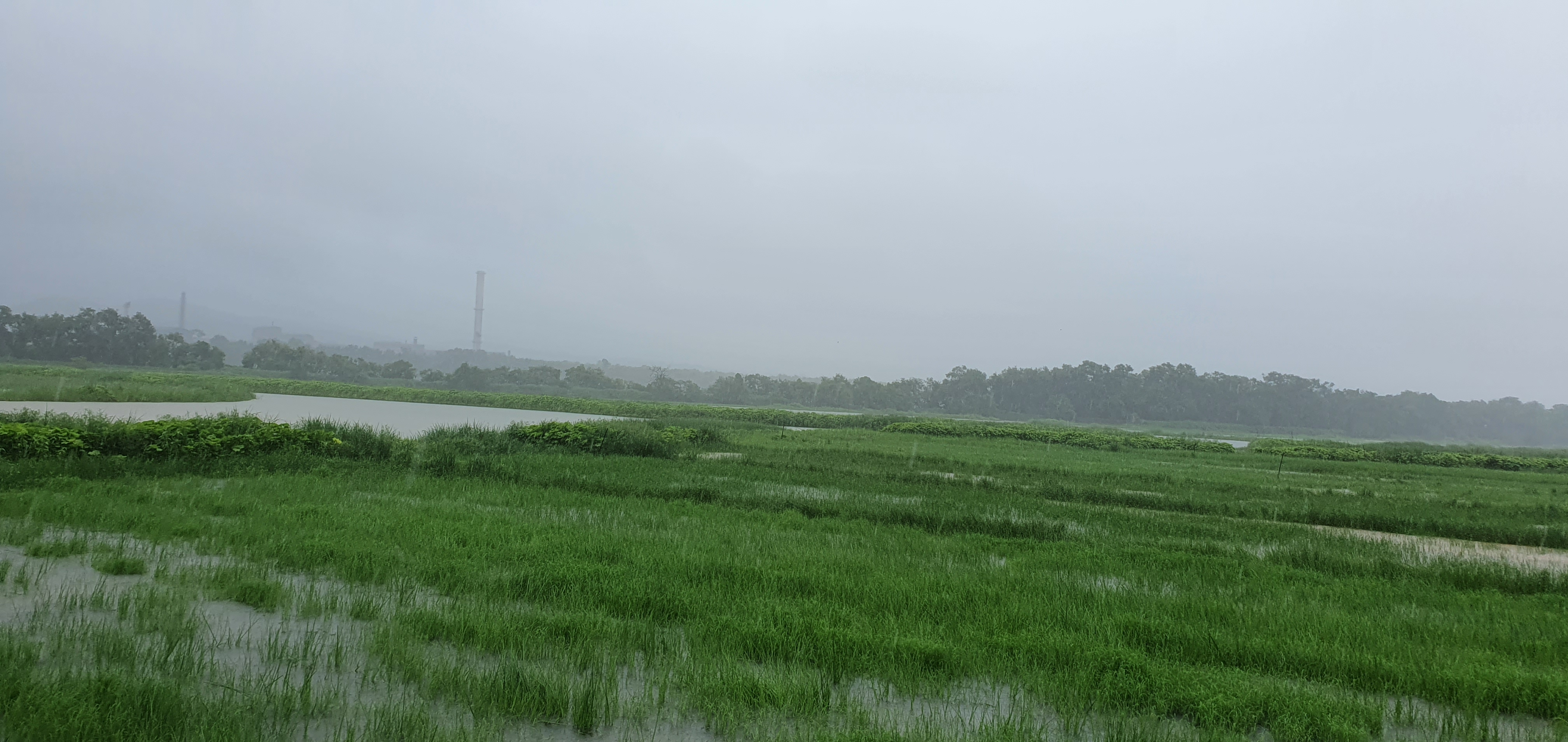
Camurlim Fields from NH17 road

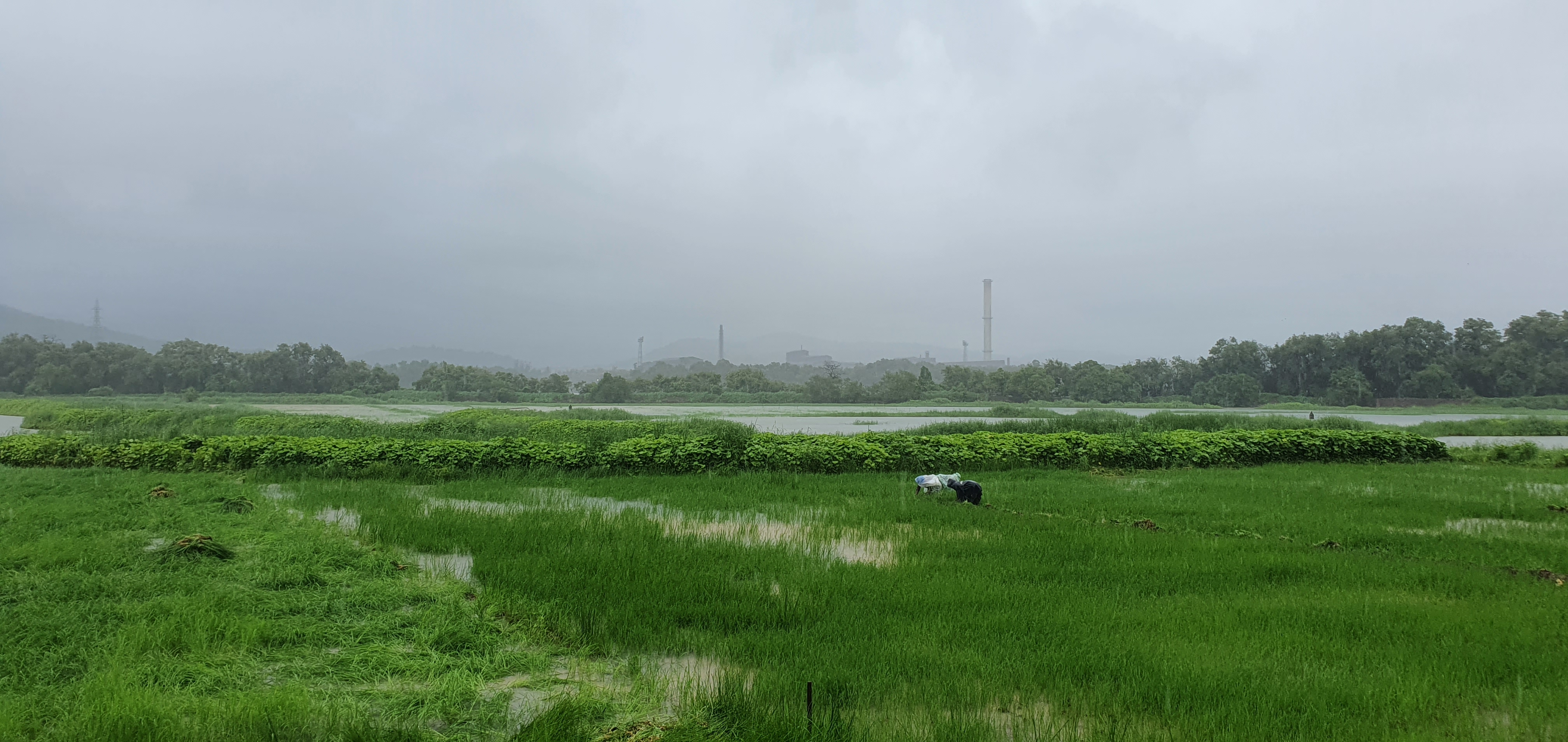
Camurlim Fields from NH17 road

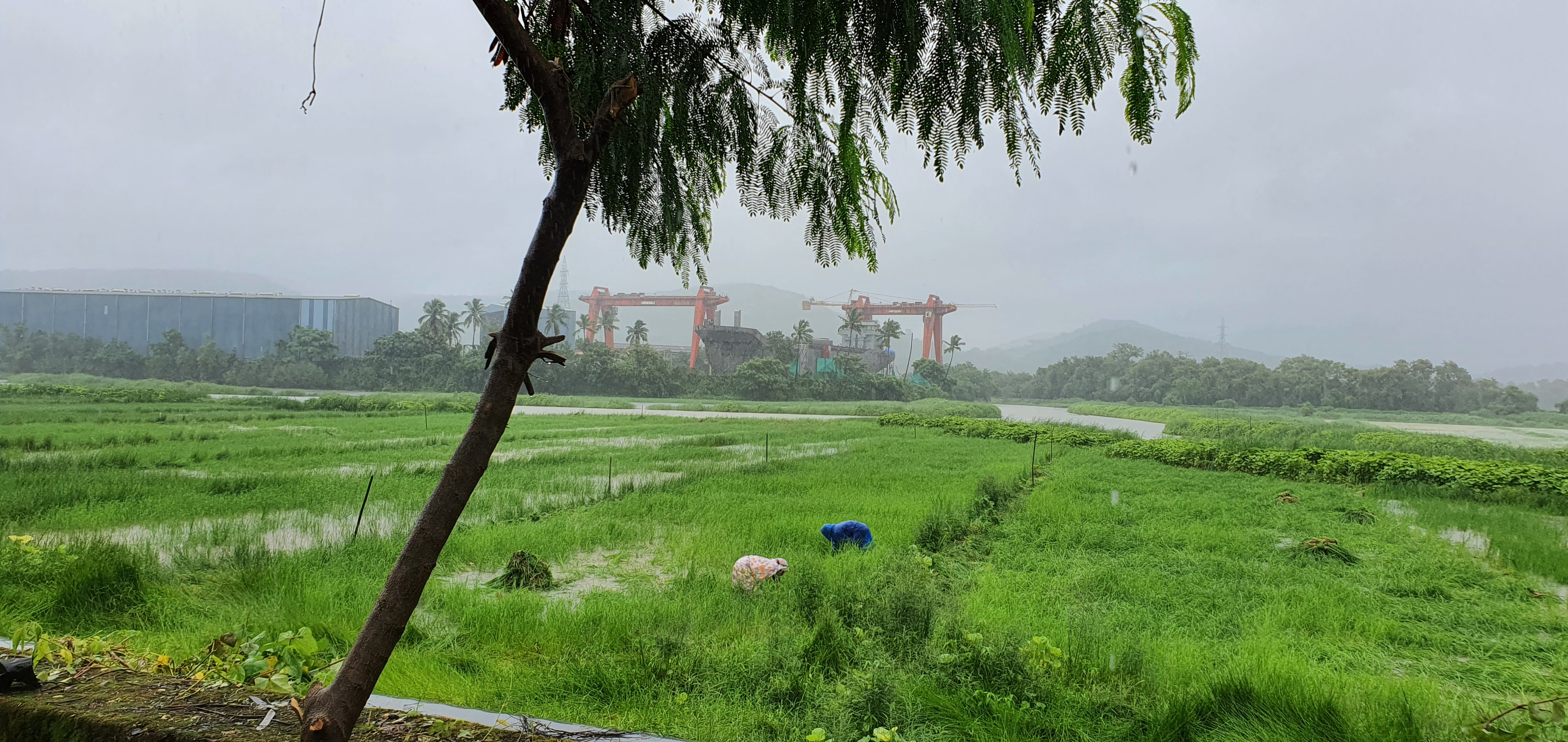
Camurlim Fields from NH17 road
Images from Camurlim, Goa, India
